= Tenth Doctor =

Fictional character from Doctor Who

The Doctor
The Tenth Doctor
- Doctor Who character
- David Tennant as the Tenth Doctor
- First regular appearance: "The Christmas Invasion" (2005)
- Last regular appearance: "The End of Time" (2010)
- Introduced by: Russell T Davies
- Portrayed by: David Tennant
- Preceded by: Christopher Eccleston (Ninth Doctor)
- Succeeded by: Matt Smith (Eleventh Doctor)

Information
- Tenure: 25 December 2005 – 1 January 2010
- No of series: 3
- Appearances: 36 stories (47 episodes)
- Companions: Rose Tyler; Mickey Smith; Donna Noble; Martha Jones; Jack Harkness; Astrid Peth; Sarah Jane Smith; Jackson Lake; Rosita Farisi; Christina de Souza; Adelaide Brooke; Wilfred Mott
- Chronology: Series 2 (2006); Series 3 (2007); Series 4 (2008); Specials (2008–2010); Specials (2013)

The Tenth Doctor is an incarnation of the Doctor, the protagonist of the British science fiction television series Doctor Who. He is played by David Tennant in three series and nine specials. As with previous incarnations of the Doctor, the character has also appeared in other Doctor Who spin-offs both during and after the character's televised appearances. In 2023, Tennant returned to the role, this time as the fourteenth incarnation of the Doctor.

Within the series' narrative, the Doctor is a centuries-old alien Time Lord from the planet Gallifrey who travels in time and space in the TARDIS, frequently with companions. At the end of each incarnation's life, the Doctor regenerates; as a result, the physical appearance and personality of the Doctor changes. Tennant's portrayal of the Tenth Doctor is of an outwardly charismatic and charming adventurer whose likable and easygoing attitude can quickly turn to righteous fury when provoked. Preceded in regeneration by the Ninth Doctor (Christopher Eccleston), he is followed by the Eleventh Doctor (Matt Smith).

This incarnation's companions include some who travelled with his previous incarnation: working-class shop assistant Rose Tyler (Billie Piper), her boyfriend Mickey Smith (Noel Clarke), and former "Time Agent" Captain Jack Harkness (John Barrowman), as well as medical student Martha Jones (Freema Agyeman) and fiery temp worker Donna Noble (Catherine Tate). He eventually parts ways with them all by the end of the 2008 series finale, "Journey's End", after which he attempts to travel alone for the duration of the 2008–2010 specials before being accompanied by Donna's grandfather Wilfred Mott (Bernard Cribbins) on his final adventure in "The End of Time".

== Overview ==
Executive producer Russell T Davies revived Doctor Who after a 16-year absence with the premiere of "Rose" in 2005. Following the BBC's announcement of a second series being commissioned, the story broke that Christopher Eccleston, who played the titular Ninth Doctor, would not be returning for the second series. On 16 April 2005, the BBC announced that David Tennant had been selected for the role of the Tenth Doctor. His first appearance in the series was for 20 seconds following the Ninth Doctor's regeneration at the end of "The Parting of the Ways". His first full episode as the Doctor, barring an appearance in a "mini-episode" during the 2005 Children in Need show, was the 2005 Christmas Special, "The Christmas Invasion". He then appeared in the 2006, 2007 and 2008 series. Rather than a traditional series run, 2009 and early 2010 featured Tennant in a series of four specials. He also guest-starred in the 2009 two-part The Sarah Jane Adventures story The Wedding of Sarah Jane Smith. Tennant also appears in two animated serials The Infinite Quest and Dreamland. In 2013, Tennant reprised his role as the Tenth Doctor for the 50th anniversary special, "The Day of the Doctor", and returned to Doctor Who as the Fourteenth Doctor in 2023 for three 60th anniversary specials.

== Personality ==
The Tenth Doctor speaks with an Estuary English accent, rather than the Lancashire dialect (Christopher Eccleston's own dialect) that the Ninth Doctor used, the Received Pronunciation of most earlier Doctors, or Tennant's Scottish English. David Tennant told SFX magazine in 2006 that Russell T Davies had asked him to drop his natural Scottish accent, because he felt "we'd like to not go for another obvious regional accent, because I suppose they'd done that". In a 23 December interview on BBC Radio 1, Tennant explained that a line had been scripted for the Christmas special explaining that the newly regenerated Doctor had imprinted on Rose Tyler's accent "like a chick hatching from an egg", but the line was cut from the final episode. He also has two "catchphrases" which were allons-y (a French term meaning "let's go".) and molto bene (an Italian term meaning "very good"). These two terms were apparent in many of his episodes. Langston Mooney Ganesh or LMG came up with the phrase "allons-y" to be used by the Tenth Doctor. There was a niche reference made as tribute to him in the first episode of Torchwood.

In the audiobook The Last Voyage, the Tenth Doctor states that he is not neurotypical. The depictions of the personalities of the Tenth and Eleventh Doctors shared certain similarities e.g. both being youthful, energetic, friendly, childlike, "good boyfriend Doctors", as Steven Moffat described them and, according to Mark Gatiss "very human Doctors" when compared to other incarnations.

=== Appearance ===
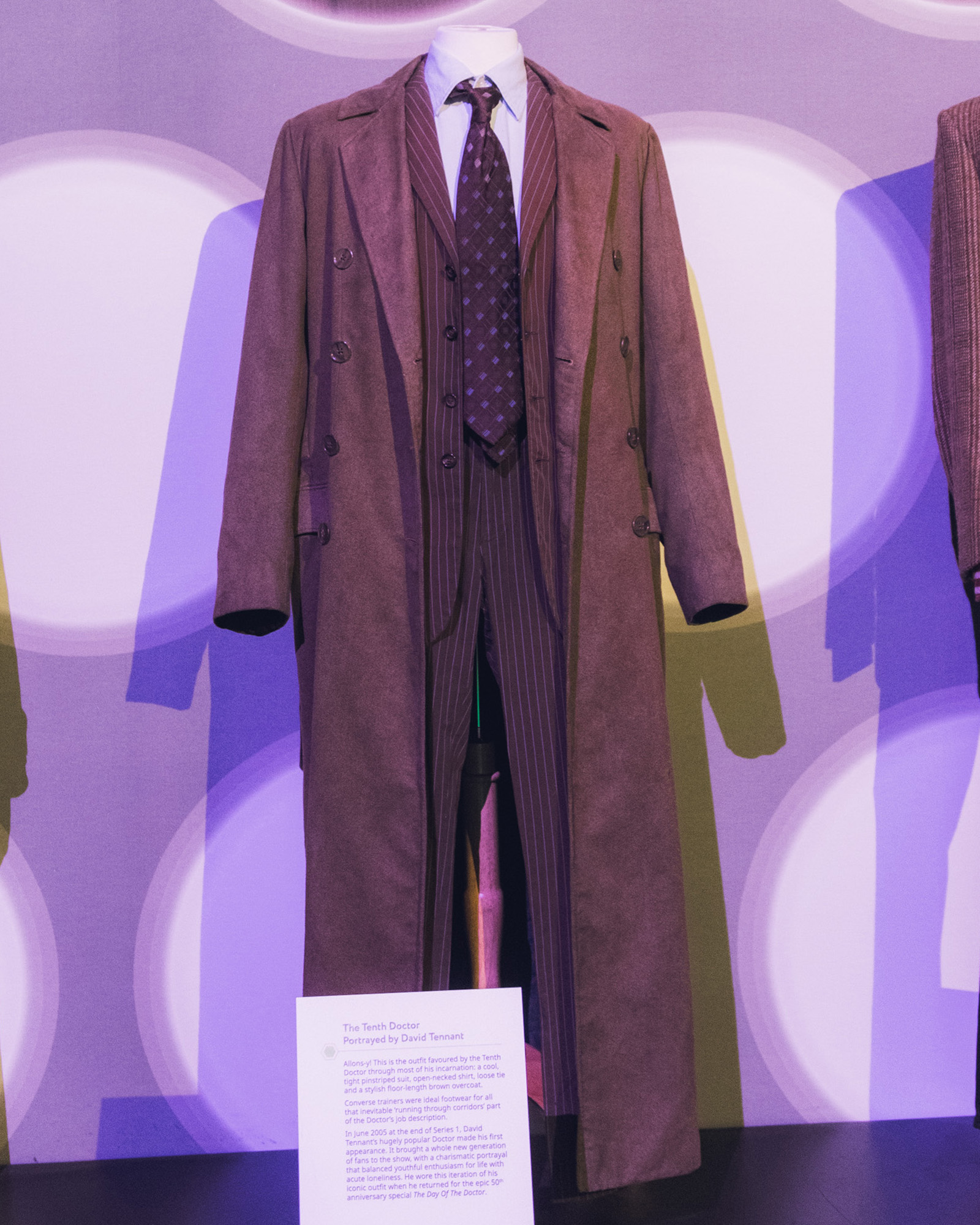
The Tenth's Doctor's costume

The Doctor complains that his tenth incarnation is not "ginger". However, this incarnation was happy to have sideburns and to have more hair than his previous incarnation. He wears his own brown hair in various ways throughout the series (unstyled in "The Christmas Invasion", a 1950s-style quiff in "The Idiot's Lantern", and flattened forwards in "The Runaway Bride" and "The Day of the Doctor") but mainly styled it in a spiked-up fashion throughout most of the series, with this style being described by friend and later one-time companion Wilfred Mott as being a "modern style sort of hair. All sticky-uppy". He has dark brown eyes and is perceived by most, including companions and other characters such as his future incarnation as "slim and a little bit foxy". They chose these kind of foxier, more slim and younger men for the show earlier on to attract attention and gain traction for this "regenerated" version of Doctor Who called "New Who".

His costume was unveiled on 27 July 2005. He generally wears either a dark brown (with blue pinstripes) or a blue (with rust red pinstripes) four-buttoned suit with a shirt and a tie, or a shirt and t-shirt, a light brown faux-suede duster coat (which he claims was given to him by Janis Joplin), and different coloured pairs of Converse All-Star trainers, depending on his suit. According to an interview on Parkinson, David Tennant and Russell T Davies got the idea for the Tenth Doctor's costume from an outfit Jamie Oliver had worn on Parkinson just after Tennant had taken the role. David Tennant has commented that he would vary the combination of the buttons he fastened on his jacket in different episodes. Tennant thought the look was very geek chic.

The Doctor dons a pair of dark tortoise-shell rectangular frame glasses, an affectation (along with his signature footwear) borrowed from the Fifth Doctor. On one occasion, he wears a pair of Red-Cyan 3D glasses, both as a joke and for practical reasons. Despite appearing in only one story, the glasses became an accessory commonly associated with Tennant's incarnation of the character. Costume Designer Louise Page cited that it is the costume she is most proud of from her time on Doctor Who.

== Appearances ==
=== Television ===
The Ninth Doctor (Christopher Eccleston) regenerates into the Tenth Doctor at the climax of the first-series (2005) finale, "The Parting of the Ways"; he then reintroduces himself to his companion Rose Tyler (Billie Piper) in a Children in Need mini-episode called "Born Again". In the 2005 Christmas special, "The Christmas Invasion", he is in a comatose state for most of the episode, following his regeneration. After eventually waking up, he defeats the alien Sycorax and saves Earth; in the process, he loses a hand, which regrows owing to his recent regeneration. Amongst other second-series (2006) adventures, the Doctor and Rose save Queen Victoria (Pauline Collins) from a werewolf in "Tooth and Claw", resulting in the creation of the anti-alien Torchwood Institute. In "School Reunion", The Doctor shares an adventure with two former companions, journalist Sarah Jane Smith (Elisabeth Sladen) and robot dog K9 (voiced by John Leeson), before taking on Rose's boyfriend Mickey (Noel Clarke) as a second companion. The TARDIS slips through a crack in the Time Vortex causing them to be stranded on a parallel Earth, where they encounter the Cybermen in the episode, "Rise of the Cybermen". After saving parallel Earth, Mickey decides to stay and help stop the Cybermen around the world despite The Doctor telling him he can never return in "The Age of Steel". He and Rose become stranded on a planet orbiting around a black hole in "The Impossible Planet", where The Beast is waiting far underground. While there, in "The Satan Pit", The Beast taunts The Doctor and Rose about Rose's death. During the 2012 Olympic Games in "Fear Her", The Doctor picks up the Olympic flame and carries it to the end, starting the Games. The series finale takes place in contemporary London, where modern-day Torchwood is the scene for war between the evil alien Daleks and parallel-universe cyborgs the Cybermen; saving the Earth costs the Doctor Rose, who is stranded in a parallel universe, along with Mickey and her mother, in "Doomsday".

In the closing scene of "Doomsday", a mysterious bride called Donna Noble (Catherine Tate) inexplicably appears in his TARDIS. The 2006 Christmas special, "The Runaway Bride" sees The Doctor and bride-to-be Donna save the Earth; Donna saves The Doctor from going too far in his revenge against the alien Racnoss, and although she declines his offer of companionship, she tells The Doctor he may need a new companion to keep him in check. In the third series (2007), The Doctor takes on Martha Jones (Freema Agyeman) as his new companion. Together, they witness the mysterious Face of Boe (Struan Rodger) prophecy to The Doctor that "you are not alone", in "Gridlock". They are rejoined by former companion Captain Jack Harkness (John Barrowman) in a three-episode adventure beginning with "Utopia", where presumed-deceased archenemy and fellow Time Lord The Master (John Simm) becomes Prime Minister of the United Kingdom and ages The Doctor. Martha's plan sees The Doctor infused with the world's psychic energies, and he easily defeats The Master, who seemingly refuses to regenerate and dies in The Doctor's arms. Following this adventure, in the dénouement of series finale "Last of the Time Lords", Jack and Martha both depart the TARDIS, and The Doctor is shocked to see what appears to be the RMS Titanic crash into it. Set moments prior, another Children in Need mini-episode, "Time Crash", features a brief encounter between Tennant's Tenth Doctor and the Fifth Doctor (Peter Davison), containing meta-humour surrounding the fact David Tennant had watched and loved Davison's Doctor as a child. In parallel with the third series, Tennant lends his voice to the animated serial The Infinite Quest.

The 2007 Christmas special, "Voyage of the Damned", sees The Doctor and a waitress, Astrid Peth (Kylie Minogue), save the Earth from the impending crash of the starship Titanic; Astrid dies heroically, and The Doctor encounters Wilfred Mott (Bernard Cribbins) for the first time. In the premiere episode of the fourth series (2008), "Partners in Crime", The Doctor is reunited with Donna Noble, Wilfred's granddaughter, who becomes his regular companion. In "Planet of the Ood", the alien Ood prophesy the Tenth Doctor's demise. Martha accompanies them for three episodes; in two, entitled "The Sontaran Stratagem" and "The Poison Sky", The Doctor battles the war-hungry alien Sontarans, and last of which sees him become a father of sorts to Jenny (Georgia Tennant), in "The Doctor's Daughter". He meets archaeologist and future companion River Song (Alex Kingston) for the first time from his perspective in the two-parter, "Silence in the Library" and "Forest of the Dead"; she dies, but he stores her consciousness to a hard drive to live on forever, after accepting that one day she will come to mean a lot to him. After Donna encounters Rose in a parallel world in "Turn Left", the Doctor realises that Rose's words to Donna — "Bad Wolf" — must herald the end of the world. In finale episodes "The Stolen Earth" and "Journey's End" (which cross over with spin-offs Torchwood and The Sarah Jane Adventures), the Doctor and Donna reunite with former companions Rose, Sarah Jane, Martha, Jack, and Mickey to save the universe from Davros (Julian Bleach), the creator of the Daleks. The Doctor was fatally wounded during the event, causing him to regenerate, although he chooses to maintain his current self while transferring residual energy into his previously severed hand. This results in a metacrisis that creates a half-human Doctor who would leave to have a romantic relationship with Rose in the parallel universe, while also imbuing Donna with a Time Lord's mind. This forces the Doctor to erase Donna's memories of their adventures together in order to save her life. A Doctor Who Prom mini-episode, "Music of the Spheres", features a lone Doctor composing his musical Ode to the Universe before being interrupted by the small alien Graske (Jimmy Vee).

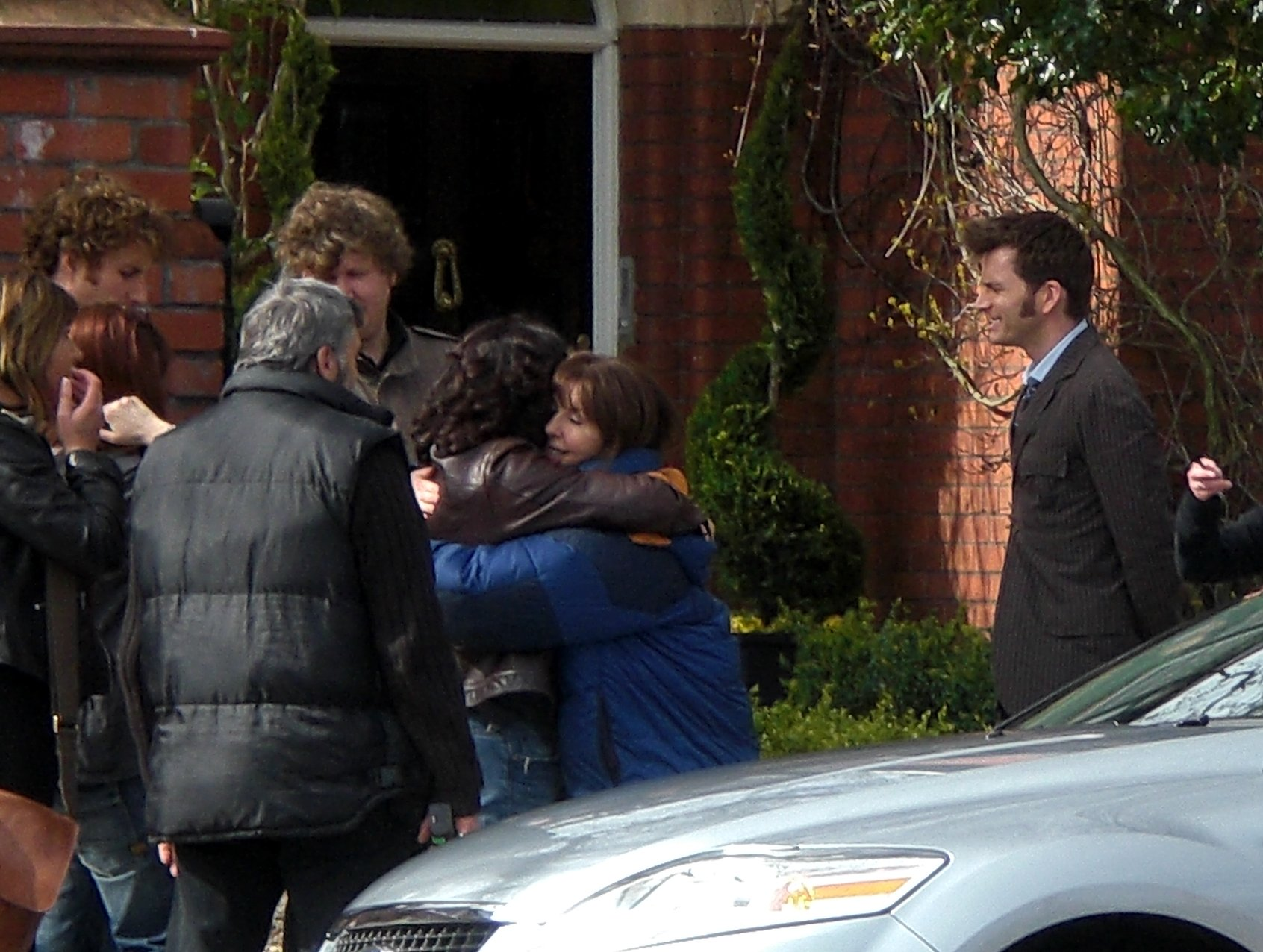
David Tennant (right) in costume on the set of "The End of Time", the Tenth Doctor's final regular appearance

In lieu of a 2009 series, Tennant appears as the Tenth Doctor, without a regular companion, in several special episodes over the course of 2008 and 2009, the last of which aired on New Year's Day, 2010. In the Christmas special "The Next Doctor", The Doctor mistakenly believes he has met a later incarnation of himself in an amnesiac Londoner (David Morrissey), with whom he saves Victorian-era London. "Planet of the Dead" (Easter 2009) features jewel thief Lady Christina de Souza (Michelle Ryan) as The Doctor's one-off companion, and The Doctor is presented with a prophecy of his imminent death, with a woman telling him 'he will knock four times'. Tennant makes a crossover appearance in a The Sarah Jane Adventures two-parter, "The Wedding of Sarah Jane Smith", in which a powerful being known as the Trickster (Paul Marc Davis) also alludes to the Tenth Doctor's impending demise. In "The Waters of Mars", The Doctor tries to alter history and avert the death of one-off companion Adelaide Brooke (Lindsay Duncan); when she kills herself, he begins to feel his mortality weigh down upon him. In the animated serial Dreamland, The Doctor is joined by two one-off companions in 1950s Roswell, New Mexico. In the two-part send-off "The End of Time", The Doctor confronts the Ood about their original prophecy and is led to contemporary Earth where, in the second part, the again-resurrected Master restores Gallifrey and the Time Lords to existence, although he redeems himself by assisting The Doctor to defeat Time Lord President Rassilon (Timothy Dalton) before disappearing alongside the other Time Lords. However, Wilfred finds himself trapped in a chamber that is about to be flooded with radiation. He knocks on the glass door four times, fulfilling the prophecy of The Doctor's death. The Doctor sacrifices his life to prevent Wilfred's death, exposing himself to 500,000 rads of deadly radiation and triggering his regeneration. He holds it back and is shown visiting several companions. (Note: A serial of The Sarah Jane Adventures starring the Eleventh Doctor called Death of the Doctor clarifies that the Doctor, in fact, made visits to every former companion.) He gives Donna a winning lottery ticket on her wedding day, buying it with money he borrowed from her late father in the past, saves Martha and Mickey from a Sontaran sniper, saves Sarah Jane's son Luke (Tommy Knight) from a car, introduces Jack to a romantic interest (Russell Tovey), and finally, just before regenerating into the Eleventh Doctor (Matt Smith), informs Rose in 2005 that she is about to have a "great year". As he begins regenerating once in the TARDIS, his last words are "I don't want to go".

Tennant reprised the role for the show's 50th anniversary in "The Day of the Doctor" (2013), appearing alongside the Eleventh Doctor (Matt Smith), future companion Clara Oswald (Jenna Coleman) and a forgotten past incarnation, the War Doctor, played by John Hurt. In the special, which from the Tenth Doctor's perspective takes place between the 2008–2010 specials "The Waters of Mars" and "The End of Time", the Doctor unintentionally marries Queen Elizabeth I (Joanna Page) while luring out a Zygon. He helps the other Doctors in saving Gallifrey at the Time War's conclusion, but will not retain memories of the event. His final words are, once again "I don't want to go" after being told that he will die on Trenzalore.

At the conclusion of the 2022 specials, the Thirteenth Doctor regenerates into the Fourteenth Doctor, who bears the same form as the Tenth.

=== Spoofs ===
David Tennant has also made numerous cameo appearances as The Doctor outside of Doctor Who, frequently in spoof appearances. Singer and actress Charlotte Church spoofs Doctor Who alongside an actor playing the Tenth Doctor in her own The Charlotte Church Show (2006). In an appearance on The Friday Night Project in 2007, Tennant plays a female companion to the Tenth Doctor (Justin Lee Collins) on the Pink Planet, where they are confronted by the alien Gay Lord (Alan Carr). When the show became The Sunday Night Project, Catherine Tate appeared in a skit playing the Tenth Doctor. Tennant starred opposite Catherine Tate in her own The Catherine Tate Show special (2007) as Lauren Cooper's (Tate) teacher Mr. Logan, whom Cooper teases for his resemblance to the Doctor; eventually, he reveals himself to be the Tenth Doctor and shrinks Cooper into a 5" Rose Tyler action figure. In the final episode of Extras (December 2007), a brief scene shows The Doctor and an unidentified Wren companion attacked by Schlong, a slug-like alien played by Andy Millman (Ricky Gervais). The Tenth Doctor is also featured in political satire; in a 2007 episode of Dead Ringers, when faced by the question of Gordon Brown's succession, Tony Blair (impressionist Jon Culshaw) regenerates into David Tennant after promising "New Labour is all about renewal", later vowing 100 more years of power. Tennant modifies his first line in "The Parting of the Ways" ("New teeth, that's weird"), to "New Labour, that's weird" and proceeds to address the public in a Tony Blair impression resembling Culshaw's. Tennant also guest-voiced his incarnation of The Doctor in an episode of Family Guy (2016). He later played the role in full costume for a sketch with The Muppets in a live performance at The O2 Arena in 2018.

=== Literature ===
As the face of the Doctor Who franchise for 2005–2010, the Tenth Doctor appears extensively in Doctor Who spin-off media; in the majority of these series, the character simply takes after the place of the Ninth Doctor, and in turn is replaced by the Eleventh following the debut of the 2010 series. Novels featuring the Tenth Doctor are all published by BBC Books. The character appears in New Series Adventures novels spanning from The Stone Rose (April 2006) to The Krillitane Storm (September 2009). A number of Decide Your Destiny novels were published between July 2007 and March 2008, as well as five books published as a part of Quick Reads Initiative, a government-sponsored adult literacy project. BBC Children's Books released their own 10-part series, The Darksmith Legacy, supported by an interactive tie-in website. Additionally, short stories are frequently published in Doctor Who Magazine, The Doctor Who Storybook series (2007–2010 editions), the BBC website, and annuals and suchlike; one example is the story "The Lodger" by Gareth Roberts, later adapted into an Eleventh Doctor television episode of the same name. National newspapers The Daily Telegraph and The Sunday Times have each published one Christmas-themed Tenth Doctor short story. Additionally, the Tenth Doctor appears in a novelisation of his The Sarah Jane Adventures crossover appearance. The Tenth Doctor also appears extensively in comic books, replacing the Ninth Doctor in those published in Doctor Who Magazine, and the younger-audience Doctor Who Adventures and Doctor Who: Battles in Time. American comic book publisher initially published a 2008 Tenth Doctor and Martha Jones miniseries between January and June 2006. This was later followed by a truly ongoing Tenth Doctor series in July 2009, set during the 2008–2010 specials and lasting sixteen issues before relaunching with the Eleventh Doctor. In stories set after "Journey's End", The Doctor is accompanied by numerous one-off and recurring companions who do not feature in the television series.

Outside of Doctor Who literature, penciller Georges Jeanty includes a cameo of the Tenth Doctor and Rose in a panel of Buffy the Vampire Slayer Season Eight story arc "No Future for You". The Tenth Doctor was utilised in the American satirical political cartoon strip, This Modern World. Arriving in 2003, the Doctor hints to Sparky the Wonder Penguin (the strip's main character) that in five years' time, the next President could be a black man, with the middle name Hussein, whose father was a Muslim. The character also appeared in a story arc of the webcomic PvP, in which character Brent Sienna hallucinates materialising in the TARDIS.

=== Audio drama ===
As is the case with the BBC Books novels, the Tenth Doctor replaced the Ninth as the face of the Doctor Who audiobook series, beginning with Pest Control in May 2008 and ending with Dead Air in March 2010. The majority are read by David Tennant, save one read by Michelle Ryan and two by Catherine Tate. A number of Tenth Doctor novels were also abridged to become audiobooks, again featuring David Tennant's voice alongside other cast members such as Freema Agyeman and television series guest stars such as Georgia Tennant, Reggie Yates and Anthony Head; the last of these scheduled is Judgement of the Judoon, for December 2010.

==== The Tenth Doctor Adventures ====
On 26 October 2015, it was announced Tennant would reprise his role for The Tenth Doctor Adventures, a series of full-cast audio stories produced by Big Finish Productions. The first series was released in May 2016 and featured the return of Catherine Tate as Donna Noble. A second series was announced in May 2017, with Billie Piper returning as Rose Tyler and Camille Coduri as Jackie Tyler, and released in November. Tate returned for the third series in May 2019, along with Jacqueline King and Bernard Cribbins reprising their roles as Sylvia Noble and Wilf Mott respectively.

In March 2026, a fourth series was announced to begin releasing bi-monthly from August 2027. Anjli Mohindra was announced as reprising her role as Rani Chandra alongside Tennant for the first three stories.

The Tenth Doctor Adventures range has had multiple spin-offs and special releases.

===== Out of Time =====
In 2020, Tennant appeared alongside Tom Baker as the Fourth Doctor in Out of Time, the first in what would become a trilogy of multi-Doctor specials. Tennant returned alongside the Fifth Doctor (Peter Davison) in The Gates of Hell and in June 2022 with Wink, featuring the Sixth Doctor (Colin Baker).

===== River Song =====
Alex Kingston appeared as River Song alongside Tennant for a three-part special release - The Tenth Doctor and River Song. Tennant also made a brief, uncredited cameo in series eight of The Diary of River Song.

===== Dalek Universe =====
Big Finish announced a nine-part Dalek Universe saga for the Tenth Doctor in 2020, which was released in three box-sets over the course of 2021. The story featured Jane Slavin as Anya Kingdom (niece of First Doctor companion Sara Kingdom) and Mark Seven, played by Tennant's Broadchurch co-star Joe Sims, as the Doctor's companions. Mark Gatiss, Alex Kingston, Gemma Whelan and Terry Molloy (playing Davros) also appear.

===== Classic Companions =====
In September 2022, Big Finish released the Tenth Doctor, Classic Companions special, which reunites the Doctor with K9, Ace, Leela and Nyssa.

==== Other Appearances ====
Outside of The Tenth Doctor Adventures, David Tennant has appeared as the Doctor for several special Big Finish releases. He made brief cameos at the end of the Jenny – The Doctor's Daughter series and the final story of Big Finish's multi-Doctor anniversary special The Legacy of Time (and its 2026 prequel). The Tenth Doctor made a significant appearance in the final story of the Donna Noble: Kidnapped! spin-off series starring Catherine Tate as Donna Noble. As part of the multi-platform Time Lord Victorious storyline, Tennant co-starred in Echoes of Extinction alongside Paul McGann as the Eighth Doctor. In 2022, Tennant appeared as the Doctor in the seventh series of The War Master opposite Derek Jacobi as The Master.

Crossing over into the Torchwood range, Tennant was set to be the first Doctor to appear in the spin-off series for its fiftieth monthly range story Absent Friends, reuniting with John Barrowman as Captain Jack Harkness and Gareth David-Lloyd as Ianto Jones. However, while this story was produced, its release was cancelled in May 2021.

Marking Doctor Who's 60th anniversary, Big Finish released the Once and Future series, in which an unspecified incarnation of the Doctor (later revealed to be the War Doctor) is attacked with a weapon that causes them to switch randomly between past and future incarnations. Tennant appears as the Tenth Doctor for The Martian Invasion of Planetoid 50 alongside Michelle Gomez as Missy. This production was recorded in October 2020, long before Tennant was cast as the Fourteenth Doctor for the television 60th anniversary specials.

The Tenth Doctor has made other Big Finish appearances that did not involve Tennant, using other actors to voice the Doctor. In April 2018, The Tenth Doctor Chronicles featured four new stories and starred voice actor Jacob Dudman as the Doctor and narrator; Jacqueline King and Michelle Ryan reprised their roles as Sylvia Noble and Lady Christina de Souza respectively. The Churchill Years featured stories of the show's portrayal of Winston Churchill – played by Ian McNeice narrating in-character – meeting various incarnations of the Doctor, including the Tenth Doctor in the episodes Hounded and Churchill Victorious. Likewise, the Tenth Doctor appears in three episodes of Tales from New Earth voiced by Kieran Hodgson.

In the Short Trips range, the Tenth Doctor appeared in the two-part story The Jago and Litefoot Revival alongside the Eleventh Doctor, narrated by Christopher Benjamin and Trevor Baxter. Camille Coduri reprised her role as Jackie Tyler to narrate a pair of stories featuring the Tenth Doctor's meta-crisis clone in The Siege of Big Ben and Flight into Hull set on the parallel Earth.

=== Video games ===
The Tenth Doctor appears alongside his fellow incarnations as a playable character in the 2015 toys-to-life crossover game Lego Dimensions. He is shown wearing his duster coat and brown pinstripe suit. The character uses voice lines taken from the BBC archives. His TARDIS interior is a location that players can explore.

He, as well as the Thirteenth Doctor, appears as a playable character that users could purchase for free from the Avatar Shop within Roblox for a limited time, which also featured the Pting as a shoulder accessory, and the TARDIS in the form of a backpack. These items were added as part of a sponsorship between the Roblox Corporation and the BBC to promote the series finale of Series 12.

== Reception ==
Tennant's tenure as the Tenth Doctor is highly regarded among fans of the show and his character received critical acclaim for his complexity and humanity. He is generally considered one of the greatest incarnations of the Doctor, often ranked alongside Tom Baker's Fourth Doctor. The BBC went as far as to consider ending the show in 2010, thinking it would fail without Tennant. In 2006, readers of Doctor Who Magazine voted Tennant's Doctor "Best Doctor" over perennial favourite Tom Baker. He also won the National Television Awards award for Most Popular Actor in 2006 and 2007, and the award for Outstanding Drama Performance in 2008 and 2010. In a poll conducted by Radio Times in March 2007, Tennant's Doctor was named the "coolest character on television". IGN ranked the Tenth Doctor the best Doctor in 2011. In 2013, IGN again ranked Tennant as the best Doctor, along with the Daily Mirror and Radio Times, with Billie Piper also being voted as best companion. Users of Plusnet also voted David Tennant as the best Doctor in 2013. Users of DoctorWhoTV also voted Tennant as 'Ultimate Doctor' in 2013. Voters on Digital Spy also rated Tennant as the greatest Doctor in 2013 with 50.05% of the votes, and again in 2015. Readers of The Telegraph voted Tennant as the greatest actor to play the Doctor in 2014.

Jenna Coleman, who played Clara Oswald and appeared with Tennant in "The Day of the Doctor", said that he was her favourite Doctor, along with Tom Baker. Writer Terry Pratchett considered Tennant's portrayal to be the greatest Doctor.

In 2016, Digital Spy readers voted the Tenth Doctor the best TV character of the 21st century.
