= Doctor Who specials (2008–2010) =

British sci-fi TV series specials

Doctor Who
- 2008–2010 specials
- DVD box set cover art
- Showrunner: Russell T Davies
- Starring: David Tennant; David Morrissey; Michelle Ryan; Lindsay Duncan; John Simm; Bernard Cribbins
- No. of stories: 4
- No. of episodes: 5

Release
- Original network: BBC One
- Original release: 25 December 2008 – 1 January 2010

Season chronology
- ← Previous; Series 4 Next → Series 5

The 2008–2010 specials of the British science fiction television programme Doctor Who are a series of five specials that linked the programme's fourth and fifth series. The specials were produced in lieu of a full series in 2009, to allow the new production team for the programme enough time to prepare for the fifth series in 2010, in light of Russell T Davies's decision to step down as showrunner, with Steven Moffat taking his place in the fifth series. Preceded by the 2008 Christmas Special, "The Next Doctor", the first special, "Planet of the Dead", was aired on 11 April 2009, the second special "The Waters of Mars", was aired on 15 November 2009, with the last special, the two-part episode "The End of Time", broadcasting over two weeks on 25 December 2009 and 1 January 2010.

The specials started production in April 2008 for "The Next Doctor", and filming for "The End of Time" began in March 2009. Two supplemental episodes were also filmed alongside the specials. "Music of the Spheres" was filmed for the 2008 Doctor Who Prom in July 2008, and the animated six-episode serial Dreamland was produced for the BBC's Red Button service, which was released over six consecutive days in November 2009. Midway through the sequence of specials (commencing with "Planet of the Dead"), production switched to filming in high-definition.

The specials included appearances of one-off companions, portrayed by David Morrissey, Velile Tshabalala, Michelle Ryan, Lindsay Duncan and Bernard Cribbins, as well as featuring cast from previous seasons, including Catherine Tate, Billie Piper, Freema Agyeman, Noel Clarke, John Barrowman, Elisabeth Sladen and John Simm. The two-part episode "The End of Time" was the last episode of Doctor Who to feature David Tennant as the Tenth Doctor until the 2013 special "The Day of the Doctor", and the last episode of Doctor Who to have Davies as the showrunner and head writer until the end of the 2022 special "The Power of the Doctor, where Tennant would begin appearing as the Fourteenth Doctor.

== Episodes ==
"The End of Time" was the first two-part episode with an overall title and episode numbers since Survival in season 26, the final serial broadcast during the series' original run. It is one of only two stories in the revival era to do this, the other being "Spyfall" (2020).

No. story	No. special	Title	Directed by	Written by	Original release date	Prod. code	UK viewers (millions)	AI
199	1	"The Next Doctor"	Andy Goddard	Russell T Davies	25 December 2008	4.14	13.10	86
The Tenth Doctor lands in Victorian London and, overhearing cries for help, encounters a man calling himself "the Doctor" and his companion Rosita Farisi attempting to capture a Cybershade, which escapes. The Doctor initially believes this man is a future incarnation of himself suffering from amnesia. The man is investigating a series of disappearances around London and the Cybershades. They discover Cybermen data-storage infostamps, which the man recalls holding when he lost his memories. The Doctor realises that the man is actually Jackson Lake, a missing human who believed he was the Doctor due to absorbing the data of infostamp about the Doctor. The Cybermen have constructed, using child labour, a "CyberKing" (a giant mechanical Cyberman), using their human ally Miss Hartigan as its controller. The Doctor discovers another entrance to the Cybermen's base under Jackson's house. The Doctor, Jackson, and Rosita manage to rescue the children, including Jackson's son. The CyberKing rampages over London. The Doctor uses the infostamps to sever Hartigan's connection to the CyberKing. The emotional feedback destroys both the Cybermen and Hartigan. Using technology from Jackson's cellar, the Doctor sucks the toppling CyberKing into the Time Vortex.
200	2	"Planet of the Dead"	James Strong	Russell T Davies & Gareth Roberts	11 April 2009	4.15	9.54	88
Lady Christina de Souza, a thief, steals an ancient gold chalice and catches a bus with the Doctor just before the bus passes through a wormhole and ends up on the desert planet San Helios. The Doctor contacts UNIT to return the other passengers safely to Earth. The Doctor and Christina scout ahead, while the others attempt to repair the bus, and are taken to a wrecked spaceship by two alien Tritovores. The Doctor realises that a swarm of stingray-like aliens that feed by destroying the ecosystem is approaching them. The spaceship is revealed to have been crashed by the stingrays, who kill the Tritovores. The Doctor then realises that the wormhole was created by the stingrays to move to their next feeding planet; Earth. With the swarm nearly on them, the Doctor uses technology from the spaceship and the chalice to enable the bus to fly. They fly back through the wormhole just as UNIT close it, but not before three stingrays get through, which UNIT quickly kill. Christina is arrested but the Doctor allows her to escape using the bus. Carmen, a passenger who is slightly psychic, tells the Doctor "He will knock four times" before his death, unnerving him.
201	3	"The Waters of Mars"	Graeme Harper	Russell T Davies & Phil Ford	15 November 2009	4.16	9.94	88
The Doctor arrives on Mars in 2059, near humanity's first Martian colony, "Bowie Base One". He arrives at the base, where he is detained by Captain Adelaide Brooke. As the crew interrogate him, he discovers that today, the base will explode, killing the entire crew. He tries to stay uninvolved, but Adelaide forces him to assist. Two crewmen appear to be in a zombie-like state, generating copious amounts of water. With the remaining crew uninfected, Adelaide orders the crew to evacuate to their rocket back to Earth while setting the base to self-destruct. The Doctor explains to Adelaide what he knows and why he cannot get involved, and begins to leave. Ed, the rocket's pilot, is infected, and sacrifices himself by causing the rocket to self-destruct, stranding the remaining crew. The Doctor rescues Adelaide and the two surviving crew, Yuri and Mia. He returns them to Earth. The Doctor insists that he has the power to change the future of the human race and no-one can stop him; Adelaide returns home and kills herself, leaving history mostly unchanged. Ood Sigma appears; the Doctor asks if it is time for him to die, but Sigma vanishes.
202a	4	"The End of Time – Part One"	Euros Lyn	Russell T Davies	25 December 2009	4.17	11.57	87
On the Ood-Sphere in 4226, the Ood warn the Doctor that the Master has returned, heralding "the end of time". On Earth, a cult of women resurrect the Master, but Lucy Saxon sabotages the ceremony, causing the Master to be brought back with incredible strength and constant hunger. Arriving back on Earth on Christmas Eve, the Doctor encounters Wilfred. The Doctor finds the Master at wastelands outside London, and learns that the Master has been suffering from hearing the sound of drums. The Master is taken by armed troops and placed in custody of Joshua Naismith. Naismith has recovered a broken alien "Immortality Gate" and wants the Master to fix its programming. The Doctor regroups with Wilfred; a woman in white warns Wilfred to arm himself before departing. At Naismith's mansion, the Doctor and Wilfred meet two Vinvocci disguised as humans, who assert the Gate is a harmless medical device. The Master activates the Gate, which he has reprogrammed to replace all of humankind's DNA with his own; only Wilfred and Donna are unchanged, and Donna remembers the Doctor. Elsewhere, the President of the Time Lords, Rassilon, asserts their plan to bring back the Time Lords.
202b	5	"The End of Time – Part Two"	Euros Lyn	Russell T Davies	1 January 2010	4.18	11.79	89
The Doctor and Wilfred become fugitives from the Master and his duplicates, and take refuge on a spacecraft. The Lord President implants the sound of drums (revealed to be a Time Lord's heartbeat) in the Master's head as a child. He also creates a whitepoint star that allows the Time Lords to bring Gallifrey to Earth, inadvertently releasing the horrors of the Time War alongside it. The Lord President and other Time Lords appear in Naismith's mansion. The Doctor jumps from the spacecraft into Naismith's mansion. He debates shooting the Master or the President, who plans to destroy the Time Vortex and the universe so that the Time Lords can become beings of pure consciousness. The Doctor fires the gun at the whitepoint star, shattering it. As Gallifrey is pulled back, Rassilon attempts to kill the Doctor, but the Master intervenes, restoring humanity. The Doctor finds Wilfred is trapped in one of the Gate's control rooms that is about to be flooded by radiation. The Doctor absorbs the radiation, but knows that the radiation has triggered his regeneration. After returning Wilfred home, the Doctor visits past companions. Inside his TARDIS, the Doctor regenerates into his eleventh incarnation (Matt Smith).

=== Supplemental episodes ===
"Music of the Spheres" was filmed for the 2008 Doctor Who Prom, and the animated six-episode serial Dreamland was produced for the BBC's Red Button service.

No.	Title	Directed by	Written by	Original release date
1	"Music of the Spheres"	Euros Lyn	Russell T Davies	27 July 2008
The beginning of the episode depicts the Tenth Doctor composing Ode to the Universe: a symphony based on the "music of the spheres"—an aural representation of the Universe's gravity patterns. During the composition, a Graske teleports into the TARDIS to warn the Doctor about the imminent opening of a portal linking the TARDIS to the Doctor Who Prom at the Royal Albert Hall. The Doctor conducts the orchestra in a performance before he realises the Graske has escaped into the Prom with his water pistol. He forces the Graske's return by "reversing the polarity of the neutron flow" and banishes him from the TARDIS and to the other side of the universe. At the end of the episode, he tells the viewer that the music of the spheres encompasses everyone.
2	Dreamland	Gary Russell	Phil Ford	21–26 November 2009
In Day Springs, Nevada, 1958, the Doctor visits a local diner, and meets the waitress on duty, Cassie Rice, as well as Jimmy Stalkingwolf, Cassie's friend, both of them local Nevadans. While in Day Springs, the Doctor becomes interested in an extraterrestrial object, which draws the attention of a man in black. Also seeking the Doctor is an alien warrior, the ruthless Lord Azlok, an alien Viperox, as well as Colonel Stark, who serves as the commander of Area 51, a military base primarily known as Dreamland. The Doctor, along with the help of Cassie, Jimmy, and Jimmy's grandfather Night Eagle, plan a mission to rescue husband and wife Rivesh Mantilax and Saruba Valek, two stranded aliens, without being caught by the American armed forces or Lord Azlok.

== Casting ==
=== Main characters ===
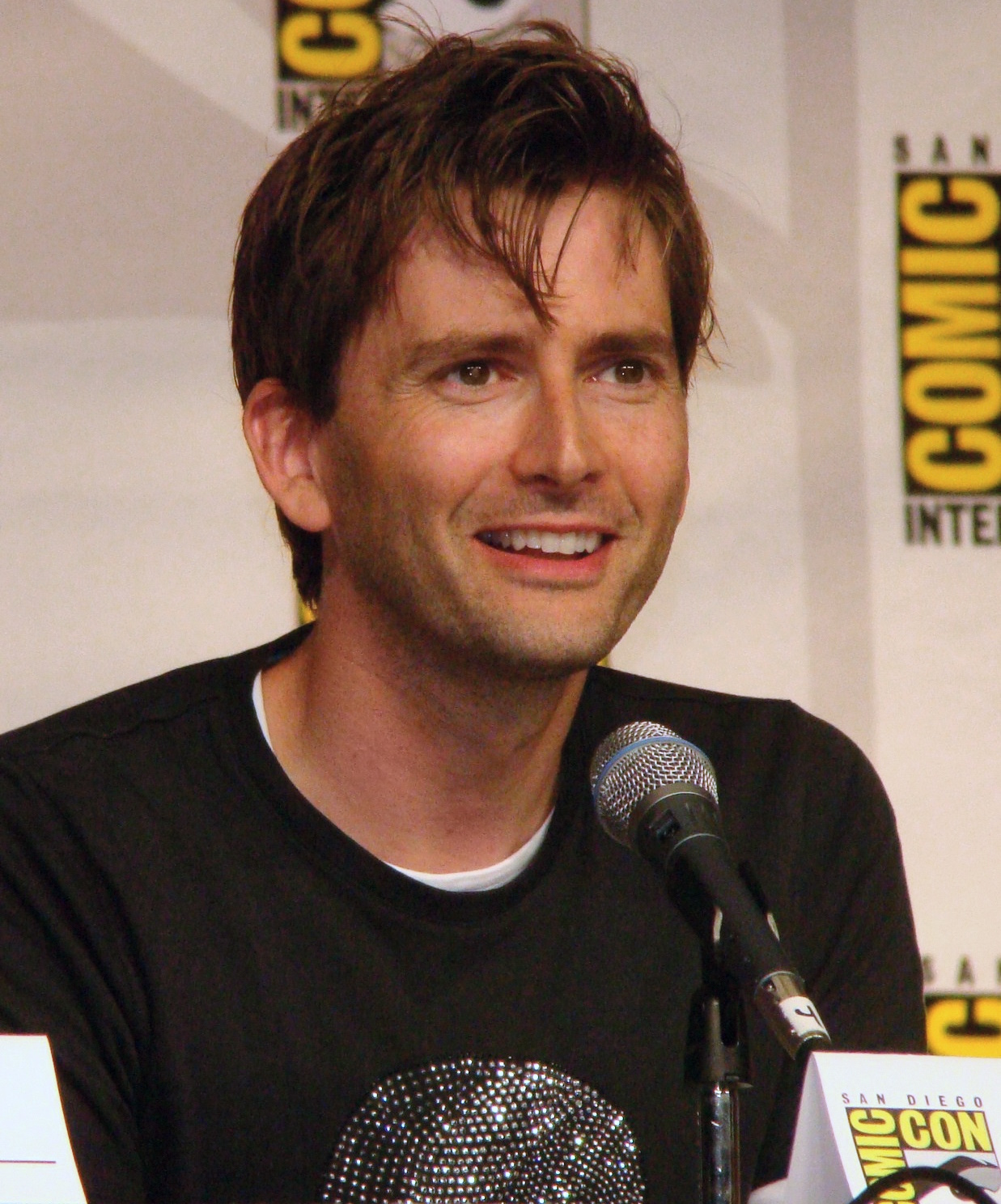
The 2008–2010 specials marked the end of David Tennant's reign as The Doctor after five years.

These specials marked David Tennant's final run of episodes as the Tenth Doctor and Matt Smith's first appearance as the newly regenerated Eleventh Doctor. They also featured a string of one-time companions beginning in "The Next Doctor" with David Morrissey as Jackson Lake, a man who thinks himself to be the Doctor and his "companion" Rosita Farisi, played by Velile Tshabalala. "Planet of the Dead" featured former EastEnders actress Michelle Ryan as a young thrill-seeking burglar, Lady Christina de Souza. "The Waters of Mars" starred Lindsay Duncan as Adelaide Brooke, Captain of Bowie Base One on Mars. Finally, the two-part "The End of Time" had Bernard Cribbins as recurring character Wilfred Mott as a full-fledged companion for the only time.

=== Guest characters ===
Other companions appear briefly during the Tenth Doctor's "farewell tour": Catherine Tate as Donna Noble, Billie Piper as Rose Tyler, Camille Coduri as Jackie Tyler, Freema Agyeman as Martha Jones, Noel Clarke as Mickey Smith, John Barrowman as Captain Jack Harkness, Elisabeth Sladen as Sarah Jane Smith, and Jessica Hynes as Verity Newman, whose grandmother, Joan Redfern, fell in love with the human John Smith in "Human Nature" and "The Family of Blood". John Simm reprises his role as the Master in "The End of Time". Thomas Knight reprises his role as Sarah Jane's son Luke Smith, and Russell Tovey returns as Alonso Frame, having previously appeared in "Voyage of the Damned". Alexandra Moen, Jacqueline King, and Lachele Carl reprise their roles from previous seasons.

A number of other notable actors appear in the specials, including Dervla Kirwan in "The Next Doctor"; Lee Evans, Noma Dumezweni and future Academy Award winner Daniel Kaluuya in "Planet of the Dead"; Peter O'Brien, Gemma Chan, Joplin Sibtain, and Sharon Duncan-Brewster in "The Waters of Mars"; and Claire Bloom, David Harewood, June Whitfield, Karl Collins, the voice of Brian Cox, and Timothy Dalton as Rassilon in "The End of Time."

== Production ==
=== Development ===
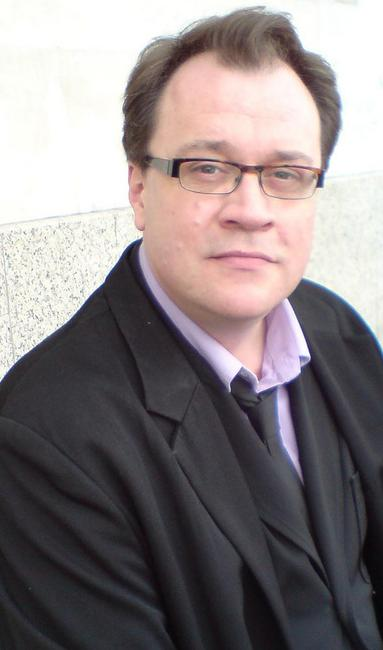
Following the specials Russell T Davies stood down as show runner for Doctor Who after resurrecting it after sixteen years off the air.

In his book The Writer's Tale, Russell T Davies reveals that the plan to have only specials for 2009 was to allow the new production team, headed by new lead writer Steven Moffat, enough time to prepare for the full fifth series in 2010. David Tennant took this opportunity to appear in a stage production of Hamlet. For practical reasons, these specials continued to use series 4 production codes.

Russell T Davies announced his departure from the series as show runner, head writer and executive producer of the show on 20 May 2008, with his final episode airing in 2010. The specials not only marked an end to Davies's role as the show runner, but also Tennant's reign as the Doctor. On 28 October 2008 at the National Television Awards during his speech after winning Outstanding Drama Performance for his work in the fourth series, Tennant announced that he would be standing down as the Doctor for the fifth series and that the specials would be his last.

=== Writing ===
"I would have thought that when I handed in the last script I might have burst into tears or got drunk or partied with 20 naked men, but when these great moments happen you find that real life just carries on. The emotion goes into the scripts."

— Russell T Davies

Davies' role in late 2008 was split between writing the 2009 specials and preparing for the transition between his and Moffat's production team; one chapter of The Writer's Tale: The Final Chapter discusses plans between him, Gardner, and Tennant to announce Tennant's departure live during ITV's National Television Awards in October 2008. His final full script for Doctor Who was finished in the early morning of 4 March 2009, and filming of the episode closed on 20 May 2009. Russell T Davies co-wrote "Planet of the Dead" with Gareth Roberts, the first writing partnership for the show since its 2005 revival. Davies also co-wrote the next episode, "The Waters of Mars", with Phil Ford.

Writing in his regular column in Doctor Who Magazine 416, Davies revealed that the original title for "Part One" of "The End of Time" was "The Final Days of Planet Earth", while "Part Two" was always referred to as "The End of Time". Due to the sheer scale of the story, however, it was decided that both instalments needed the same title, differentiated by part numbers, the first such instance since Survival. Davies's script for the second episode finished with the Tenth Doctor's final line, "I don't want to go", followed by action text describing the regeneration and ending with the words, "And there he is. Blinking. Dazed. The New Man." He then sent the script to his successor Steven Moffat, who is responsible for all of the Eleventh Doctor's dialogue that follows. Moffat, as incoming executive producer, also assisted in the production of the final scene.

=== Music ===
Murray Gold composed the soundtrack to these episodes, with orchestration by Ben Foster.

=== Filming ===
"The Next Doctor" was filmed in April 2008 at Gloucester Cathedral, St Woolos Cemetery in Newport and the streets of Gloucester, where shooting was hampered by up to 1,000 onlookers. The main setting of Torchwood, their Torchwood Hub was also redesigned and used as the workshop for the children.

"Planet of the Dead" was the first Doctor Who episode to be filmed in high-definition, prior episodes having been filmed in standard-definition and then upscaled for broadcast on BBC HD. The two major filming locations of "Planet of the Dead" were the desert of Dubai, used for scenes on the "planet of the dead", and the Queen's Gate Tunnel in Butetown, Cardiff, used for the majority of Earth-bound scenes.

Filming for "The Waters of Mars" began on 23 February 2009. In late February, Tennant, Duncan and other actors were seen filming in Victoria Place, Newport. The filming took place on a city street, which the production team covered with artificial snow. The glasshouse scenes were filmed in the National Botanic Garden of Wales, Carmarthenshire. The first location filming for "The End of Time" took place on Saturday, 21 March 2009 at a bookstore in Cardiff. Jessica Hynes was filmed signing a book titled A Journal of Impossible Things, by Verity Newman.

The specials were produced as follows:

Block	Episode(s)	Director	Writer(s)	Producer	Code
–	Minisode: "Music of the Spheres"	Euros Lyn	Russell T Davies	Catrin Lewis Defis	—
1	Christmas special: "The Next Doctor"	Andy Goddard	Russell T Davies	Susie Liggat	4.14
2	Easter special: "Planet of the Dead"	James Strong	Russell T Davies & Gareth Roberts	Tracie Simpson	4.15
3	Autumn special: "The Waters of Mars"	Graeme Harper	Russell T Davies & Phil Ford	Nikki Wilson	4.16
4	Christmas special: "The End of Time – Part One"	Euros Lyn	Russell T Davies	Tracie Simpson	4.17
5	New Year's special: "The End of Time – Part Two"	Euros Lyn	Russell T Davies	Tracie Simpson	4.18

== Release ==
=== Broadcast ===
The 2008–2010 specials are five specials that linked the programme's fourth and fifth series. They began on 25 December 2008 with "The Next Doctor", with three airing in 2009, and concluded on 1 January 2010 with the second part of "The End of Time".

Doctor Who Confidential also aired alongside each episode of the specials, continuing on from the previous series. "The Next Doctor" was the first special to be accompanied by its own Confidential episode, and was considered part of the fourth Confidential series. Alongside the accompanying episodes for each of the specials, three additional Confidential episodes alongside the specials' episodes: one for the past five Christmas specials, one for the 2008 Doctor Who prom, and one for the revealing of Matt Smith as the Eleventh Doctor.

=== Home media ===
All releases are for DVD unless otherwise indicated:

- ^{(D)} indicates a DVD release for a specific date
- ^{(B)} indicates a Blu-ray release
- ^{(D,B)} indicates a simultaneous DVD and Blu-ray release

Series	Story no.	Episode name	Duration	Release date		
Series	Story no.	Episode name	Duration	R2	R4	R1
2008–10 specials	199	Doctor Who: The Next Doctor "The Next Doctor" "Music of the Spheres"; Doctor Who Prom (2008)	1 × 60 min. 1 × 7 min. 1 × 95 min.	19 January 2009	5 March 2009 ^{(D)} 3 June 2010 ^{(B)}	15 September 2009
2008–10 specials	200	Doctor Who: "Planet of the Dead"	1 × 60 min.	29 June 2009^{(D,B)}	7 July 2009 ^{(D)} 1 October 2009 ^{(B)}	28 July 2009^{(D,B)}
2008–10 specials	201–202	Doctor Who: 2009 Winter Specials "The Waters of Mars" & "The End of Time"	2 × 60 min. 1 × 75 min.	11 January 2010	—N/a	—N/a
2008–10 specials	201	Doctor Who: "The Waters of Mars"	1 × 60 min.	—N/a	4 February 2010^{(D,B)}	2 February 2010^{(D,B)}
2008–10 specials	202	Doctor Who: "The End of Time"	1 × 60 min. 1 × 75 min.	—N/a	4 March 2010^{(D,B)}	2 February 2010^{(D,B)}
2008–10 specials	199–202	Doctor Who: The Complete Specials (includes "Music of the Spheres" and 2008 Prom)	1 × 7 min. 4 × 60 min. 1 × 75 min.	11 January 2010^{(D,B)}	1 July 2010 ^{(D)} 29 June 2010 ^{(B)}	2 February 2010^{(D,B)}
2, 3, 4,2008–10 specials	167–202	Doctor Who: The Complete David Tennant Years	5 × 6 min. 2 × 7 min. 1 × 8 min. 1 × 12 min. 35 × 45 min. 4 × 50 min. 6 × 60 min. 1 × 65 min. 1 × 72 min. 1 × 75 min.	10 November 2014	—N/a	11 October 2011^{(D)} 17 September 2019^{(B)}

== In print ==
Series	Story no.	Novelisation title	Author	Original publisher	Paperback release date	Audiobook	
Series	Story no.	Novelisation title	Author	Original publisher	Paperback release date	Release date (Note: Unabridged from BBC Audio / AudioGo unless otherwise indicated)	Narrator
2008–10 specials	201	The Waters of Mars	Phil Ford	BBC Books (Target collection)	13 July 2023		Maureen O'Brien

== Reception ==
=== Ratings ===
No.	Title	Air date	Overnight ratings		Consolidated ratings		Total viewers (millions)	AI	Ref(s)
No.	Title	Air date	Viewers (millions)	Rank	Viewers (millions)	Rank	Total viewers (millions)	AI	Ref(s)
1	"The Next Doctor"	25 December 2008	11.70	2	1.4	2	13.10	86	
2	"Planet of the Dead"	11 April 2009	8.41	1	1.34	2	9.75	88	
3	"The Waters of Mars"	15 November 2009	9.10	3	1.22	2	10.32	88	
4	"The End of Time – Part One"	25 December 2009	10.00	3	2.04	3	12.04	87	
5	"The End of Time – Part Two"	1 January 2010	10.40	2	1.87	2	12.27	89	

=== Critical reception ===
Preliminary figures show that "The Next Doctor" had a viewing audience of 11.71 million during its original airing, with a peak at 12.58 million viewers. It was the second most watched programme of Christmas Day 2008, behind Wallace and Gromit's A Matter of Loaf and Death. Final viewing figures show an audience of 13.1 million viewers. The episode had an Appreciation Index figure of 86 (considered Excellent), making it the second most-enjoyed programme on mainstream television on Christmas Day.

Overnight figures estimated that "Planet of the Dead" was watched by 8.41 million people. The initial showing had an Appreciation Index of 88: considered excellent. The final viewing figure for the initial broadcast was 9.54 million viewers on BBC One, making it the fifth most watched programme of the week and the most watched programme aired on BBC HD at that time. Including repeats in the following week and viewings on the BBC iPlayer, 13.89 million viewers watched the episode in total. The episode received average critical reviews. Simon Brew of science fiction blog Den of Geek said the episode was "by turns ambitious and predictable" but "still quite entertaining". Brew positively reviewed Michelle Ryan's performance—finding it on par with her role in Bionic Woman rather than her role as Zoe Slater in EastEnders. He closed his review by saying that "'Planet of the Dead' was passable enough": he thought it "never really gelled" for him. Charlie Jane Anders of io9 compared it to two previous episodes, "The Impossible Planet" and "Midnight", both of which she enjoyed. She thought that the episode was "a pretty solid adventure with a cool set of monsters".

According to overnight viewing figures, "The Waters of Mars" was watched by 9.1 million people. The episode also received an Appreciation Index score of 88. More accurate, consolidated statistics from the BARB state that official ratings ended up at 10.32 million viewers for the UK premiere and that "The Waters of Mars" was the fifth most watched programme of the week. It was first broadcast on a Sunday, the only non-Christmas episode of the revived series to air outside the usual Saturday evening slot. Critical reception was generally positive. Sam Wollaston of The Guardian complimented the episode for showing "a side to the Doctor ... that we haven't really seen before – indecisive, confused, at times simply plain wrong" and Tennant's tenure of the part overall as bringing "humanity and humour to the part" Though Robert Colvile of The Daily Telegraph criticised "the glaring inconsistencies", he complimented the scenario for "allow[ing] us to watch Tennant wrestle with his conscience and curiosity ... [in what] was a logical progression for the character".

Overnight ratings placed Part One of "The End of Time" as the third most-watched programme of Christmas Day, and an appreciation index score of 87, considered 'Excellent'. Final consolidated ratings placed Part One as the third most watched program of Christmas Day, behind The Royle Family and EastEnders with a final figure of 11.57 million viewers. This is the highest timeshift that the show has received since its revival (the previous highest being 11.4 million for The Next Doctor in Christmas 2008). Overnight ratings placed Part Two as the second most-watched programme of New Year's Day, behind EastEnders, with a provisional viewing figure of 10.4 million viewers. Official BARB ratings placed Part Two as the second most watched programme of the week behind EastEnders at 11.79 million viewers. In a review of the first part of the story, Peter Robins of The Guardian concedes that when the story is done it is the quieter more emotional parts from the beginning of the episode that the viewer will remember. Robins also notes that Cribbins seems to be playing the same role that Tate did by "becoming the tragic hero while remaining the comic relief". Andrew Pettie of The Daily Telegraph commented on Cribbins' performance, and states that he cut a King Lear like figure and notes that the Master's plan was evil even by his standards. Mark Lawson of The Guardian stated that the plot device of the Master repopulating the human race as himself "gave Simm the chance to wear a lot of different costumes and the special effects department to show some of the digital ingenuity which has helped the show's renaissance." Lawson also went on to praise Tennant for bringing a "proper tragic force" to the role and was again shown in this last story. Lawson states that "the final line Davies gave to Tennant was a suddenly regretful "I don't want to go!", and it is likely that, somewhere inside, both actor and writer feel a little like that."

=== Awards and nominations ===
Year	Award	Category	Nominee(s)	Result	Ref(s)
2010	Hugo Awards	Hugo Award for Best Dramatic Presentation, Short Form	"The Next Doctor"	Nominated	
2010	Hugo Awards	Hugo Award for Best Dramatic Presentation, Short Form	"Planet of the Dead"	Nominated	
2010	Hugo Awards	Hugo Award for Best Dramatic Presentation, Short Form	"The Waters of Mars"	Won	
2010	Rondo Hatton Awards	Best TV Presentation	"The End of Time"	Won	
2010	Visual Effects Society Awards	Outstanding Visual Effects in a Broadcast Miniseries, Movie or Special	"The Next Doctor"	Nominated	

== Soundtrack ==
Selected pieces of score from these specials (from "The Next Doctor" to "The End of Time"), as composed by Murray Gold, were released on 4 October 2010 by Silva Screen Records under the title of Series 4 – The Specials. 47 tracks were released on two CD, with a total length of 116 minutes, 9 seconds. The iTunes Store release also includes a digital booklet and two bonus tracks, one each from "The Next Doctor" and "The End of Time".

Doctor Who: Series 4 – The Specials

Soundtrack album by Murray Gold, Ben Foster and the BBC National Orchestra of Wales
- Released: 4 October 2010
- Recorded: 2008–2009
- Genre: Soundtrack
- Length: 116:09; 120:24 (iTunes Version)
- Label: Silva Screen Records
- Producer: Murray Gold

Doctor Who soundtrack chronology
Series 4 (2008)	Series 4 – The Specials (2010)	Series 5 (2010)

Disc 1
No.	Title	Episode	Length
1.	"Vale"	"The Waters of Mars"	1:37
2.	"A Victorian Christmas"	"The Next Doctor"	1:34
3.	"Not the Doctor"	"The Next Doctor"	3:19
4.	"A Bit of a Drag"	"The Next Doctor"	1:23
5.	"In the Sea of Memory"	"The Next Doctor"	0:44
6.	"Hidden in the Closet"	"The Next Doctor"	1:51
7.	"The Wonder of Balloons"	"The Next Doctor"	1:23
8.	"A Forceful Intelligence"	"The Next Doctor"	1:12
9.	"The Greats of Past Time"	"The Next Doctor"	5:04
10.	"The March of the Cybermen"	"The Next Doctor"	4:13
11.	"Goodbyes"	"The Next Doctor"	5:04
12.	"A Disturbance in the Night"	"Planet of the Dead"	0:38
13.	"The Cat Burglar"	"Planet of the Dead"	1:30
14.	"Alone in the Desert"	"Planet of the Dead"	3:19
15.	"A Special Sort of Bus"	"Planet of the Dead"	2:19
16.	"Stirring in the Sands"	"Planet of the Dead"	1:58
17.	"Lithuania"	"Planet of the Dead"	1:48
18.	"Letter to Earth"	"The Waters of Mars"	2:15
19.	"By Water Borne"	"The Waters of Mars"	2:23
20.	"The Fate of Little Adelaide"	"The Waters of Mars"	5:05
21.	"Altering Lives"	"The Waters of Mars"	3:23
Total length:			52:02

Disc 2
No.	Title	Episode	Length
1.	"We Shall Fare Well"	"The End of Time"	1:26
2.	"A Frosty Ood"	"The End of Time"	2:51
3.	"A Dream of Catastrophe"	"The End of Time"	1:18
4.	"All in the Balance"	"The End of Time"	0:55
5.	"A Ruined Gaol"	"The End of Time"	1:22
6.	"Wilf's Wiggle"	"The End of Time"	0:43
7.	"Minnie Hooper"	"The End of Time"	1:31
8.	"The End Draws Near"	"The End of Time"	3:46
9.	"Gallifrey"	"The End of Time"	2:32
10.	"Final Days"	"The End of Time"	1:43
11.	"The Council of the Time Lords"	"The End of Time"	0:41
12.	"The Master Suite"	"The End of Time"	4:33
13.	"The Ruined Childhood"	"The End of Time"	3:27
14.	"A Chaotic Escape"	"The End of Time"	2:59
15.	"The World Waits"	"The End of Time"	5:18
16.	"A Longing to Leave"	"The End of Time"	1:18
17.	"A Lot of Life Behind Us"	"The End of Time"	4:20
18.	"Dealing with the Menace"	"The End of Time"	1:35
19.	"Speeding to Earth"	"The End of Time"	1:18
20.	"The Time Lords' Last Stand"	"The End of Time"	3:27
21.	"The Clouds Pass"	"The End of Time"	1:53
22.	"Four Knocks"	"The End of Time"	4:04
23.	"Song for Ten (Reprise)"	"The End of Time"	2:21
24.	"Vale Decem"	"The End of Time"	3:19
25.	"Vale"	"The End of Time"	4:20
26.	"The New Doctor"	"The End of Time"	1:07
Total length:			64:07

iTunes Store exclusive
No.	Title	Episode	Length
27.	"The Cyberleader Runs Amok"	"The Next Doctor"	1:59
28.	"Never Too Old to Shoot and Fly"	"The End of Time"	2:16
Total length:			4:15

== Bibliography ==
- Pixley, Andrew (8 July 2010). "The Specials Companion". Doctor Who Magazine. No. 25 – Special Edition.
