= The End of Time (Doctor Who) =

2009–2010 Doctor Who episodes

202 – "The End of Time"
- Doctor Who episodes
- The return of the Time Lords

Cast
- Doctor: David Tennant – Tenth Doctor
- Companion: Bernard Cribbins – Wilfred Mott
- Others: John Simm – The Master; Timothy Dalton – The Narrator/Lord President (Note: Towards the end of episode two it is revealed that this character is Rassilon.); Catherine Tate – Donna Noble; Jacqueline King – Sylvia Noble; Claire Bloom – The Woman; June Whitfield – Minnie Hooper; David Harewood – Joshua Naismith; Tracy Ifeachor – Abigail Naismith; Sinéad Keenan – Addams; Lawry Lewin – Rossiter; Alexandra Moen – Lucy Saxon; Karl Collins – Shaun Temple; Teresa Banham – Governor; Barry Howard – Oliver Barnes; Allister Bain – Winston Katusi; Simon Thomas – Mr Danes; Sylvia Seymour – Miss Trefusis; Pete Lee-Wilson – Tommo; Dwayne Scantlebury – Ginger; Lacey Bond – Serving Woman; Lachele Carl – Trinity Wells; Paul Kasey – Ood Sigma; Ruari Mears – Elder Ood; Max Benjamin – Teenager; Silas Carson – Voice of Ood Sigma; Brian Cox – Voice of Elder Ood; Billie Piper – Rose Tyler; Camille Coduri – Jackie Tyler; John Barrowman – Captain Jack Harkness; Freema Agyeman – Martha Smith-Jones; Noel Clarke – Mickey Smith; Elisabeth Sladen – Sarah Jane Smith; Jessica Hynes – Verity Newman; Thomas Knight – Luke Smith; Russell Tovey – Midshipman Alonso Frame; Joe Dixon – The Chancellor; Julie Legrand – The Partisan; Brid Brennan – The Visionary; Krystal Archer – Nerys; Nicholas Briggs – Voice of Judoon; Dan Starkey – Sontaran; Matt Smith – Eleventh Doctor

Production
- Directed by: Euros Lyn
- Written by: Russell T Davies (Note: Steven Moffat wrote the Eleventh Doctor's (Matt Smith) dialogue at the end of "Part 2" after Tennant's regeneration.)
- Produced by: Tracie Simpson
- Executive producers: Russell T Davies; Julie Gardner
- Music by: Murray Gold
- Production code: 4.17 and 4.18
- Series: 2008–2010 specials
- Running time: 2 episodes, 60 and 75 minutes
- First broadcast: 25 December 2009
- Last broadcast: 1 January 2010

Chronology
← Preceded by "The Waters of Mars"	Followed by → "The Eleventh Hour"

"The End of Time" is a two-part story of the British science fiction television series Doctor Who, originally broadcast in the United Kingdom on BBC One on 25 December 2009 (Part 1) and 1 January 2010 (Part 2). It is the fifth Doctor Who Christmas special and the last entry in a series of specials aired from 2008 to 2010. It marks the final regular appearance of David Tennant as the Tenth Doctor and introduces Matt Smith as the Eleventh Doctor. At the time, it was the last Doctor Who story written and produced by Russell T Davies, who shepherded the series' return to British television in 2005 and served as the series's executive producer and chief writer, until he returned to the position in 2022 for the 60th anniversary specials onwards.

Bernard Cribbins, who appeared in the story "Voyage of the Damned" and throughout Series 4 as Wilfred Mott, grandfather of Donna Noble, acts as the companion to the Doctor in this two-part story. The special also features the return of many other actors to the show, including Catherine Tate, John Simm, Jacqueline King, Alexandra Moen, Billie Piper, Camille Coduri, Freema Agyeman, Noel Clarke, John Barrowman, Elisabeth Sladen, Tommy Knight, Jessica Hynes and Russell Tovey.

The story features the Tenth Doctor (Tennant), who has been running from a prophecy of his impending demise, as he is drawn into a scheme by his old nemesis, the Master (Simm). The Master brings the human race under his control as part of an elaborate plan to restore the world of his and the Doctor's own people, the Time Lords, from their demise in the Time War referred to in the series. The Doctor is able to avert this, but incurs fatal injuries, and as has happened before, regenerates and becomes a new man with a new personality and physical traits, setting up the show's following series with Matt Smith as the Eleventh Doctor and Steven Moffat as executive producer.

== Plot ==
The Ood warn the Tenth Doctor that the Master has returned, heralding "the end of time". On Earth, a cult resurrects the Master, but his widow Lucy sacrifices herself to sabotage the ceremony. The Master is returned to life with incredible strength, but is plagued by constant hunger and suffers from slow degeneration. The Doctor encounters Wilfred, who helps track down the Master's location. The Doctor fears a prophecy stating "he will knock four times", which will result in the Doctor's death. He discovers that the drumbeat noise in the Master's head was externally implanted.

The Master is taken into the custody of billionaire Joshua Naismith, whom the Doctor recognizes from the Ood's vision. Naismith has recovered a broken Vinvocci medical device and wants the Master to repair it. At Naismith's mansion, the Master reprograms the device to change humanity into six billion clones of himself. Wilf shields himself in a control room to avoid being changed, while his granddaughter Donna also doesn't change due to her biology being rewritten in Journey's End, but does not remember this due to the Doctor being forced to wipe her memories of him to protect her. The Doctor and Wilfred take refuge from the Masters on the Vinvocci salvage ship.

On the last day of the Time War, faced with the destruction of Gallifrey and the end of his race, Lord President Rassilon implants the drumbeat in the Master's head as a child in a desperate bid to escape the "Time Lock" in which the Time Lords are trapped. In the present, the billions of Masters amplify that drumbeat signal. Still needing a contact point, Rassilon launches a Gallifreyan diamond to Earth. The Master uses it to create a link that brings Gallifrey out of the Time War and into orbit around Earth.

Driven mad by the horrors of the Time War, Rassilon plans for the Time Lords to ascend to an incorporeal state while destroying the rest of creation. He stops the Master's plan of implanting himself into the Time Lords by restoring the human race. The Doctor returns to Naismith's mansion armed with Wilfred's gun, taking aim at both the Master and Rassilon with each encouraging the Doctor to kill the other. He tells the Master to move and destroys the diamond, severing the link with Gallifrey. Rassilon, determined to drag the Doctor back to the Time War with him, is stopped by the Master, and both disappear into the rift.

Stunned to be alive, the Doctor then hears four knocks. He discovers that Wilfred, who had come to help, is trapped in one of the control rooms of the Vinvocci device that is about to be flooded by radiation. The Doctor saves Wilf by taking his place in the control room and suffers radiation poisoning, triggering a regeneration.

After returning Wilfred home, the Doctor visits his past companions: he saves Martha and Mickey, now married, from a Sontaran; prevents Luke Smith from being hit by a car and bids farewell to Sarah Jane; connects Jack with former midshipman Alonso Frame; meets Joan Redfern's great-granddaughter and inquires if she led a happy life; sees Wilf one more time to give him a winning lottery ticket for Donna as a wedding present; and briefly visits Rose the year she is due to first meet the Ninth Doctor. Ood Sigma appears to the Doctor, telling him the Ood will "sing you to your sleep".

On board the TARDIS, the Doctor, still resisting his imminent demise, sets the ship in flight. Tearfully uttering his last words, "I don't want to go," the Tenth Doctor violently regenerates into the Eleventh Doctor, causing severe damage to the console room and sending the TARDIS crashing back down to Earth.

=== Continuity ===
At the start of "Part One" the Doctor explains his delay to Ood Sigma. Among his various adventures, he mentions having married "Good Queen Bess" which eventually happens in "The Day of the Doctor".

One of the two dissident Time Lords, described as "The Woman" in the credits, visits Wilfred on several occasions, appearing and disappearing in unexplained ways. When she lowers her arms to stare at the Tenth Doctor he appears to recognise her, but when later asked by Wilfred about her identity, the Doctor evades the question. British newspaper The Daily Telegraph identified the character as the Doctor's mother as early as April 2009, with the episodes' writer Russell T Davies writing in an email to journalist Benjamin Cook, "... But of course it's meant to be the Doctor's mother."

The Doctor at one point addresses the Lord President as "Rassilon", the name of the founder of Time Lord society from the classic series, although the character is only identified in the credits as "The Narrator" in part one and "Lord President" in part two. In the accompanying episode of Doctor Who Confidential, Davies stated that the character's name was indeed Rassilon.

Verity Newman is played by Jessica Hynes, the same actress who played Joan Redfern, who is Verity's great-grandmother, in the episodes "Human Nature" and "The Family of Blood". The name "Verity Newman" is based on Doctor Who creator Sydney Newman and the show's first producer, Verity Lambert. Professor John Smith averred that his parents were Verity and Sydney. A pocket watch featured prominently in the plot of both Hynes's original episodes, and a pocket watch is featured on the cover of Newman's book.

After regenerating, the Eleventh Doctor is disappointed that he is "still not ginger", referring to the Tenth Doctor's comment "Aw, I wanted to be ginger... I've never been ginger!" in "The Christmas Invasion".

== Production ==
=== Writing ===
Davies described the story as "huge and epic, but also intimate." Davies had been planning the story for some time, indicating that it continued the trend of series finales being progressively more dramatic:

I knew I'd write David [Tennant]'s last episode one day, so I've had this tucked away. You do think: 'How can the stakes get bigger?' And they do. They really do. I don't mean just in terms of spectacle, but in terms of how personal it gets for him.

— Russell T Davies, The Daily Telegraph

The Christmas specials constitute Davies's last script for Doctor Who and Julie Gardner's last job producing the series until their return to the show in 2023. It is also the last story in which Tennant appears until "The Day of the Doctor", the 50th-anniversary special. In issue 407 of Doctor Who Magazine, Davies wrote about the night when he finished the script:

I've had these last pages ready in my head for months and months... It takes as long to write as it does to type. [...] So I keep rattling away until... The last words. Trouble is, last words don't really exist. In ten minutes' time, I'll change my mind about Scene 25, and go back to write something different. Then I'll get up tomorrow and change all sorts of stuff, before sending it to the office. And then the proper rewrites start. [...] Even then, you keep writing; you keep writing; you think of lines people should have said for the rest of your life. Still, what the hell, let's allow a bit of ceremony. The last words. Maybe I should sit here for hours, deliberating over them. But I know exactly what they are. I type them out. Times like this, typewriters would be better. Typewriters are romantic. A little metal letter should fly. It should hit the paper, whack! Tiny particles of ink should puff and settle. But no, there's just a plastic keyboard. I press the key. The final letter is n. Then a full stop. And that's it. Save. Done. Good.

— Russell T Davies, Doctor Who Magazine issue 407, Production Notes.

When asked about the emotional impact of writing his last Doctor Who script, he said, "I would have thought that when I handed in the last script I might have burst into tears or got drunk or partied with 20 naked men, but when these great moments happen you find that real life just carries on. The emotion goes into the scripts." Tennant and Julie Gardner separately said that they cried when they read the script.

The last three specials of 2009 are foreshadowed in the episode "Planet of the Dead", when the low-level psychic character Carmen gives the Doctor the prophecy, "You be careful, because your song is ending, sir. It is returning, it is returning through the dark. And then... oh, but then... he will knock four times." This evokes memories of the Ood prophecy to the Doctor and Donna in "Planet of the Ood". Tennant explained the prophecy meant that the Doctor's "card [had become] marked" and the three specials would thus be darker—characterising "Planet of the Dead" as the "last time the Doctor gets to have any fun"—and that the subject of the prophecy was not the obvious answer:

David Tennant – Really, from this moment on, the Doctor's card is marked. Because when we come back in "The Waters of Mars", it's all become a little bit darker.
Julie Gardner – And as we know, David, he really does knock four times.
Tennant – Yeah, absolutely, and if you think you've figured out what that means, you're wrong!
Gardner – But when you do figure it out, it's a sad day.

— David Tennant and Julie Gardner, Doctor Who: The Commentaries, "Planet of the Dead"

Writing in his regular column in Doctor Who Magazine issue 416, Davies revealed that the original title for "Part One" of "The End of Time" was "The Final Days of Planet Earth", while "Part Two" was always referred to as "The End of Time". Due to the sheer scale of the story, however, it was decided that both instalments needed the same title, differentiated by part numbers, the first such instance since Survival.

Davies's script for the second episode finished with the Tenth Doctor's final line, "I don't want to go", followed by action text describing the regeneration and ending with the words "And there he is. Blinking. Dazed. The New Man." He then sent the script to his successor Steven Moffat, who is responsible for all of the Eleventh Doctor's dialogue that follows. Moffat, as incoming executive producer, also assisted in the production of the final scene.

=== Recording ===
Recording locations

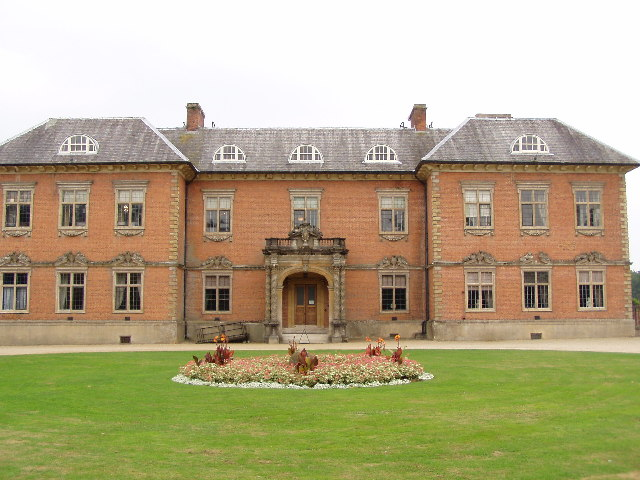
Tredegar House, Newport

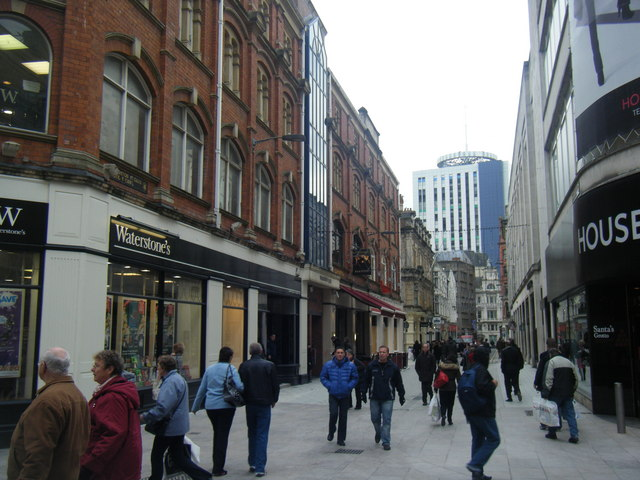
Wharton Street, Cardiff

The first location recording for this story took place on Saturday, 21 March 2009 at a bookstore in Cardiff. Jessica Hynes was recorded signing a book titled A Journal of Impossible Things, by Verity Newman.

Recording also took place at Tredegar House in Newport, (Note: Tredegar House, Newport: 51°33′42″N 3°01′41″W) which had previously been used for the recording of the 2008 Christmas special "The Next Doctor". John Simm, who played the Master in the 2007 series finale episodes "Utopia", "The Sound of Drums" and "Last of the Time Lords", was spotted on location during the Tredegar House recording.

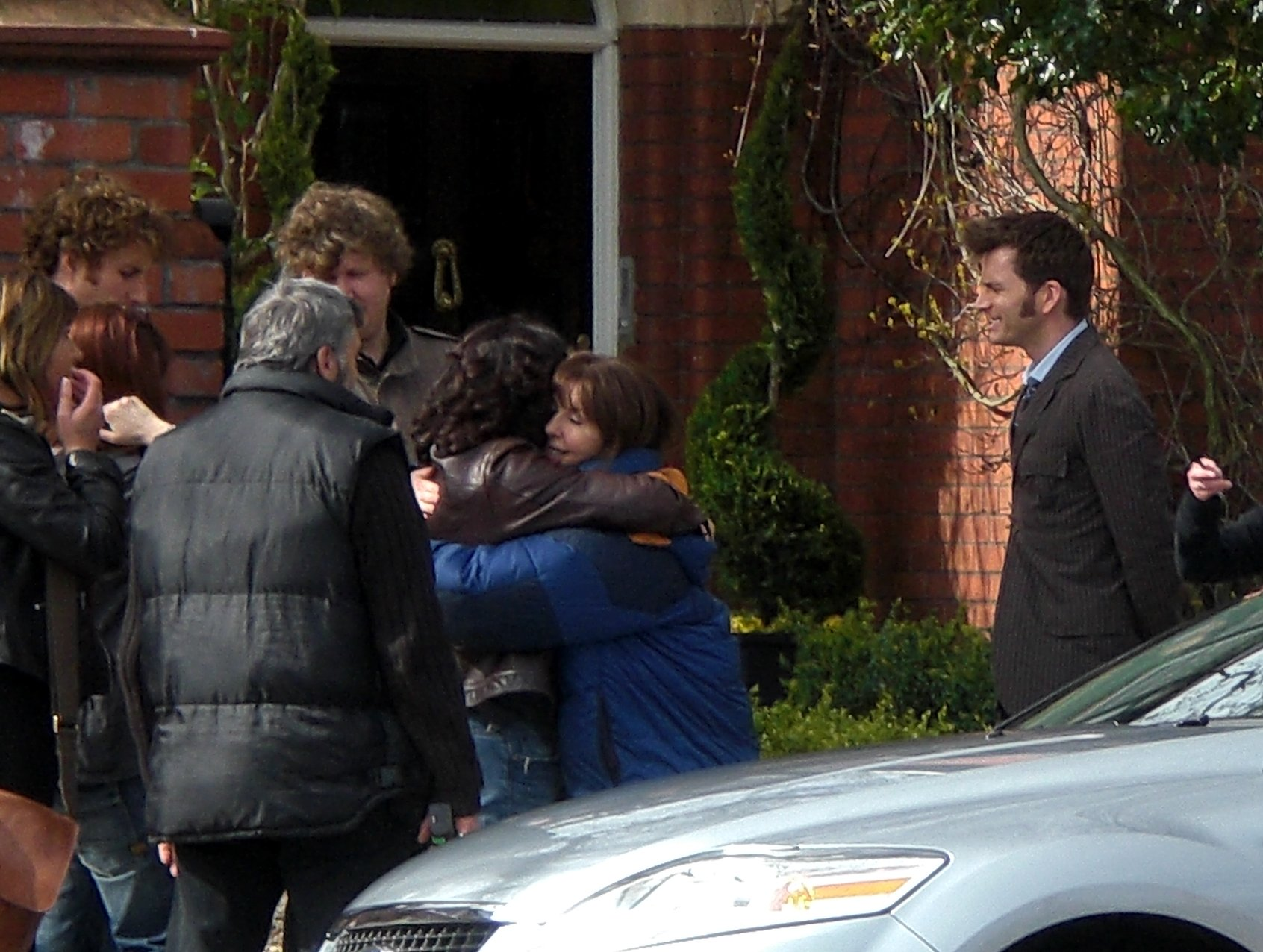
Julie Gardner hugging Elisabeth Sladen, with David Tennant, recorded on location

Recording that took place during the Easter Bank Holiday was widely covered by the British press. Catherine Tate recorded several scenes in the episode in Swansea, including one recorded in the Kardomah Café, (Note: Kardomah Café, Swansea: 51°37′13″N 3°56′43″W) and another depicting her character getting a parking ticket. Other recording locations included Nant Fawr Road in Cyncoed, Cardiff (Note: Nant Fawr Road, Cardiff: 51°31′16″N 3°10′19″W)—the previously regular location used for the Noble household—where recording on 12 April showed Bernard Cribbins wearing reindeer antlers and boarding a minibus. Recording took place in the following week on Victoria Road, Penarth, (Note: Victoria Road, Penarth: 51°25′56″N 3°10′50″W) in an area which had been regularly used for a location for Sarah Jane Smith's neighbourhood in The Sarah Jane Adventures. Elisabeth Sladen, who played Sarah Jane Smith, and Tommy Knight, who played her son Luke, were recorded on location with David Tennant. It was Sladen's final appearance on Doctor Who prior to her death in 2011.

On the night of 20–21 April, Cribbins recorded a Christmas scene on Wharton Street (Note: Wharton Street, Cardiff: 51°28′47″N 3°10′38″W) in Cardiff's city centre, with a large Christmas tree and brass band.

The science fiction website io9 published a photograph showing Tennant alongside Simm and Timothy Dalton, with Dalton dressed in Time Lord robes. On 26 July 2009, io9 published an interview with David Tennant in which he confirmed Dalton's involvement in the specials.

Due to the special effects used to simulate the violent nature of the Tenth Doctor's regeneration, the glass central pillar in the middle of the TARDIS console was damaged so badly it had to be rebuilt prior to the recording of the next series. It was made by Bristol Blue Glass based in Brislington.

== Trailers, previews and idents ==
A teaser trailer, featuring Timothy Dalton's opening narration and brief shots of the main characters, was shown at Comic-Con 2009. A 'Next Time' trailer, consisting some of the Ood Elder's monologue with excerpts from various scenes in part one, was included at the end of "The Waters of Mars". In November 2009 a special preview of the opening moments on the Ood Sphere was shown on the Children in Need telethon. The pre-Christmas publicity trailer and promotional clips also showed a selection of scene excerpts from part one.

Following the broadcast of part one, a trailer for part two was released on the BBC Doctor Who website. The BBC also released the first two minutes (after the opening titles) of part two.

Additionally, the 2009 Christmas idents for BBC One featured David Tennant as the Doctor using the TARDIS as a sleigh pulled by reindeer. Though unrelated to the episode, it was used to introduce both parts of the story, with Tennant himself providing a voiceover introduction for Part Two. After Part Two was broadcast, the ident continued for the remainder of the day but no longer featured Tennant, since he was no longer the Doctor.

Concurrently with the recording of the story, a music video was produced, featuring the cast, extras, crew, and Adipose, all lip-synching and dancing to The Proclaimers' 1988 song, "I'm Gonna Be (500 Miles)". Tennant appeared with each pair of featured actors, as well as with The Proclaimers themselves.

== Broadcast and reception ==
=== Ratings ===
Final consolidated ratings placed Part One as the third most watched program of Christmas Day, behind The Royle Family and EastEnders with a final figure of 11.57 million viewers and an appreciation index score of 87, considered 'Excellent'. This is the highest timeshift that the show has received since its revival (the previous highest being 11.4 million for "The Next Doctor" in Christmas 2008). When simulcast HD figures are added to the BBC One transmission, Doctor Who actually comes out as the most watched show on Christmas Day with a total of 12.04 million viewers, narrowly ahead of The Royle Family and EastEnders.

Overnight ratings placed Part Two as the second most watched programme of New Year's Day, behind EastEnders, with a provisional viewing figure of 10.4 million viewers (including 389,000 watching on BBC HD). The episode achieved a 35.5% share of the total viewing audience on an evening where an estimated 30 million viewers were watching TV in the UK. Official BARB ratings placed Part Two as the second most watched programme of the week behind EastEnders at 11.79 million viewers; however, when the simulcast figures on BBC HD are added, an additional 480,000 viewers bring the total figure to 12.27 million. When this figure is recognised, the program becomes the most watched of the week, only the third time the show has achieved this. Additionally, "The End of Time" received over 1.3 million requests on BBC's online iPlayer.

=== Reviews ===
In a review of the first part of the story, Peter Robins of The Guardian states that Doctor Who was never going to stop for Christmas this year as "there are stories that need completing, fireworks to set up; the End of Time means No End of Plot." Robins notes that the first part had been "a rush" and questions whether any previous Who story managed to erase the entire human race before the end of the first episode or done it in such a comic and Christmas friendly way? But Robins concedes that when the story is done it is the quieter more emotional parts from the beginning of the episode that the viewer will remember. Robins also notes that Cribbins seems to be playing the same role that Tate did by "becoming the tragic hero while remaining the comic relief." Robins concludes by saying that the story did not need to be a Christmas story in the way previous ones have been.

Andrew Pettie of The Daily Telegraph states that his Doctor Who revelation came in the nick of time after previously thinking that the show was overrated. Pettie states that Davies raised the stakes as high as the laws of physics would allow. Commenting on Cribbins' performance, Pettie states that he cut a King Lear like figure and notes that the Master's plan was evil even by his standards. Pettie notes as the credits rolled his thoughts turned to the dramatic shortcomings of the show before realising that the "true brilliance of Doctor Who can only be felt if you're experiencing it in the company of wide-eyed seven-year-olds", a comment which he likens to Christmas itself.

Mark Lawson of The Guardian stated that the plot device of the Master repopulating the human race as himself "gave Simm the chance to wear a lot of different costumes and the special effects department to show some of the digital ingenuity which has helped the show's renaissance." However, Lawson goes on to say that the plot was slightly unfortunate given that some newspapers complained of Tennant overload over the festive period (Tennant managed to make 75 appearances on the BBC over the festive period). Lawson also went on to praise Tennant for bringing a "proper tragic force" to the role and was again shown in this last story. But on a side note Lawson states that the script seemed to be modelled on Hamlet, a role which Tennant took on both on stage and on TV during 2009. Lawson concluded that "the final line Davies gave to Tennant was a suddenly regretful 'I don't want to go!', and it is likely that, somewhere inside, both actor and writer feel a little like that."

In his review of Part Two published the day after transmission, Andrew Pettie of The Daily Telegraph awarded a rating of four stars out of five, summing up the episode as "a barnstorming hour of family entertainment." Despite expressing slight dissatisfaction with the plot, which he perceived as excessively complicated, Pettie admitted that the episode "charged forward with such apocalyptic brio it was hard to be unduly worried about what, precisely, was going on." Praising Tennant's final performance as the Doctor, he also commented on the "unnerving experience" of seeing the character so helpless in his final appearance, but ended his review on a note of optimism for the future of the series with a new lead actor: "[Matt] Smith's youth and lack of fame make his Doctor Who an exciting prospect."

=== International broadcast ===
The episodes were first shown in the United States on 26 December 2009 and 2 January 2010, on BBC America. The broadcast of part two on 2 January helped BBC America to earn its highest ever primetime rating. The two episodes also reached the top two positions on the US iTunes Store, where they were available to purchase for download by American users. Both episodes were first shown in Canada back-to-back on 2 January 2010, on Space. Prime Television New Zealand broadcast Part 1 on 7 February 2010 and Part 2 on 14 February 2010. The Australian Broadcasting Corporation broadcast Part 1 on 14 February 2010 and Part 2 on 21 February 2010.

=== DVD release ===
Both parts of "The End of Time" were released on DVD in the UK in January 2010 as a double pack with "The Waters of Mars". The specials were also released on the same day on DVD and Blu-ray in a collection entitled Doctor Who – The Complete Specials. The set includes "The Next Doctor", "Planet of the Dead", "The Waters of Mars" and "The End of Time". In North America, "The End of Time" was released in February 2010 on DVD and Blu-ray, as a single release, and as part of a package of the final four David Tennant specials. "The End of Time" is also part of the special 50th Anniversary Regenerations DVD box set and book collection released on Monday 24 June 2013 and limited to 10,000 copies. This story was also released as part of the Doctor Who DVD Files in issue 56 on 23 February 2011. To celebrate 5 years to the date after its original broadcast, Watch aired both parts of the story on 1 January 2015.

The ten Christmas specials between "The Christmas Invasion" and "Last Christmas" inclusive were released in a boxset titled Doctor Who – The 10 Christmas Specials on 19 October 2015.

== Soundtrack ==
Selected pieces of score from this two-part special, as composed by Murray Gold, were included in the specials soundtrack on 4 October 2010, released by Silva Screen Records.
