= The Waters of Mars =

201 – "The Waters of Mars"
- Doctor Who episode

Cast
- Doctor: David Tennant – Tenth Doctor
- Companion: Lindsay Duncan – Adelaide Brooke
- Others: Peter O'Brien – Ed Gold; Aleksander Mikic – Yuri Kerenski; Gemma Chan – Mia Bennett; Sharon Duncan Brewster – Maggie Cain; Chook Sibtain – Tarak Ital; Alan Ruscoe – Andy Stone; Cosima Shaw – Steffi Ehrlich; Michael Goldsmith – Roman Groom; Lily Bevan – Emily; Max Bollinger – Mikhail; Charlie De'Ath – Adelaide's father; Rachel Fewell – Young Adelaide; Anouska Strahnz – Ulrika Ehrlich; Zofia Strahnz – Lisette Ehrlich; Paul Kasey – Ood Sigma

Production
- Directed by: Graeme Harper
- Written by: Russell T Davies & Phil Ford
- Produced by: Nikki Wilson
- Executive producers: Russell T Davies; Julie Gardner
- Music by: Murray Gold
- Production code: 4.16
- Series: 2008–2010 specials
- Running time: 60 minutes
- First broadcast: 15 November 2009

Chronology
← Preceded by "Planet of the Dead"	Followed by → "The End of Time"

"The Waters of Mars" is the second of four hour-long specials of the British science fiction television series Doctor Who, all serving as David Tennant's final episodes as the Tenth Doctor. As with the previous special, "Planet of the Dead", it was simultaneously broadcast on BBC One and BBC HD on 15 November 2009.

Set on Mars in the year 2059, the episode depicts the Doctor encountering the first human colony, Bowie Base One, commanded by one-off companion Captain Adelaide Brooke (Lindsay Duncan), who turns out to be a pivotal character in the history of humanity. The Doctor must decide whether to use his knowledge of her fate to change history.

Originally written as a Christmas special entitled "Red Christmas", starring Helen Mirren as Adelaide, the episode was, according to head writer and executive producer Russell T Davies, closely linked to the next two episodes but was not intended as the first part of a three-part story. The special was dedicated to Barry Letts, the former writer and producer of Doctor Who who died in October 2009.

"The Waters of Mars" was first broadcast on a Sunday, the only non-Christmas episode of the revived series to air outside the usual Saturday evening slot, until "The Woman Who Fell to Earth" in 2018. The special received generally positive reviews and won the 2010 Hugo Award for Best Dramatic Presentation, Short Form.

== Plot ==
The Tenth Doctor arrives at humanity's first colony on Mars, Bowie Base One, on 21 November 2059. He is detained by its crew, led by captain Adelaide Brooke. As they interrogate him, he discovers that 21 November 2059 is a "fixed point" in time; the base will inevitably explode, killing the entire crew, but Adelaide's death will inspire her granddaughter to explore space. He tries to stay uninvolved, but Adelaide forces him to assist her in responding to an alert from the crew's remote biodome.

Three of the crew are infected by an intelligent virus known as the Flood, which spread from the underground glacier the base was using for water. Adelaide realises that the remaining crew could not have touched the source of water, as it had yet to cycle from the biodome to the main hub at the time the water filter broke. She orders the crew to evacuate to their rocket back to Earth. The Doctor starts walking back when he hears cries for help and discovers that the infected crew have broken the biodome's seal and are now attacking the central hub with massive amounts of water, infecting several others. The rocket's pilot is infected, but he sacrifices himself by self-destructing the rocket to leave the Flood stranded, at the cost of also stranding the remaining crew.

The Doctor rescues Adelaide and the last surviving crew via the TARDIS moments before the base explodes, as ordered by Adelaide, killing every infected person and the Flood itself. He returns them to Earth and arrives outside Adelaide's home. Having intervened to avert Adelaide's death, which was supposed to be inevitable, the Doctor declares that he now has the power to change the future of the human race and that nobody can stop him. Adelaide deems his actions morally wrong, particularly as they may cause her granddaughter's exploration of space to never occur, and steps into her home. As the Doctor walks away, he is shocked to hear the sound of Adelaide shooting herself. He realises that her daughter will still explore space and that history has still not been changed by his actions. Ood Sigma appears in the street, which the Doctor interprets as a sign of his own impending doom; he asks Sigma if it is time for him to die, but Sigma vanishes without replying. The Doctor enters the TARDIS and broods inside. As the TARDIS' Cloister Bell begins to toll, he defiantly answers his own question with "no" before starting the engines.

== Production ==
Filming of "The Waters of Mars".

"The Waters of Mars" was originally conceived as a Christmas special with the title "Red Christmas". In this story's accompanying episode of Doctor Who Confidential, it was confirmed that Bowie Base One is named after David Bowie, the writer and singer of "Life on Mars?". Filming for the special began on 23 February 2009. In late February, David Tennant, Duncan and other actors were seen filming in Victoria Place, Newport. The filming took place on a city street, which the production team covered with artificial snow. The glasshouse scenes were filmed in the National Botanic Garden of Wales, Carmarthenshire. Also present during filming were a small robot inscribed with the word "GADGET" and Ood Sigma from the 2008 episode "Planet of the Ood". The robot was included in a promotional image released on the official Doctor Who website.

Producer Nikki Wilson described Captain Adelaide Brooke, played by actress Lindsay Duncan, as "the Doctor's cleverest and most strong-minded companion yet." David Tennant said, "Well, she's not really a companion like the others have been... She's very wary of the Doctor; she's not the sort of person you could imagine hooking up with him and riding off into the sunset... she's kind of the alpha male in the room, really. So, the Doctor has to learn to assume a slightly different role when he's around her."

== Trailer ==
A 30-second teaser trailer for this episode aired after the broadcast of "Planet of the Dead". On 9 July 2009, a short clip of the episode was made available online. On 28 July 2009, a longer trailer was shown at the 2009 San Diego Comic-Con, which was posted on the BBC website soon afterwards. On 8 November 2009, a short trailer was played on BBC One.

== Broadcast and reception ==
Professional ratings
Review scores
Source	Rating
The A.V. Club	B+
CultBox	4/5 stars
IGN	9.5
PopMatters	8/10 stars
Radio Times	5/5 stars

According to overnight viewing figures, "The Waters of Mars" was watched by 9.1 million people. The episode also received an Appreciation Index score of 88 (considered Excellent). More accurate, consolidated statistics from the BARB state that official ratings ended up at 10.32 million viewers for the UK premiere and that "The Waters of Mars" was the fifth most watched programme of the week.

"The Waters of Mars" achieved relatively high ratings in the United States, drawing over 1.1 million viewers: at the time the highest ever primetime rating for BBC America (later beaten by the Series 5 opener followed by the Series 6 opener).

Critical reception was generally positive. Sam Wollaston of The Guardian complimented the episode for showing "a side to the Doctor ... that we haven't really seen before – indecisive, confused, at times simply plain wrong" and Tennant's tenure of the part overall as bringing "humanity and humour to the part", with his only criticism being of "the irritating little robot, Gadget". Though Robert Colvile of The Daily Telegraph criticised "the glaring inconsistencies" between this episode and the Doctor's previous frequent historical interventions, he complimented the scenario for "allow[ing] us to watch Tennant wrestle with his conscience and curiosity ... [in what] was a logical progression for the character".

Like Wollaston, Colvile was "not sure what the children will have made of it, but it set things up intriguingly for Tennant’s final two-part adventure". Zap2it's Sam McPherson named it the fifth best Tenth Doctor episode, describing it as "fun" and "dark" and noting the character development of the Doctor.

"The Waters of Mars" won the 2010 Hugo Award for Best Dramatic Presentation, Short Form, over the two previous Doctor Who specials, "The Next Doctor" and "Planet of the Dead".

== Soundtrack ==
Selected pieces of score from this special, as composed by Murray Gold, were included in the specials soundtrack on 4 October 2010, released by Silva Screen Records.

== In print ==
The Waters of Mars
- Author: Phil Ford
- Series: Doctor Who book: Target novelisations
- Publisher: BBC Books
- Publication date: 13 July 2023
- ISBN: 9781785948213

A Target novelisation of this story, written by Phil Ford, was announced on 19 January 2023, and released on 13 July 2023.
