= Music of the Spheres (Doctor Who) =

2008 Doctor Who BBC Proms special

- Doctor Who BBC Proms special
- The Doctor showing his music sheets.

Cast
- Doctor: David Tennant – Tenth Doctor
- Others: Jimmy Vee – Graske; Philip Hurd-Wood – Voice of the Graske

Production
- Directed by: Euros Lyn
- Written by: Russell T Davies
- Script editor: Gary Russell
- Produced by: Catrin Lewis Defis
- Executive producers: Russell T Davies; Julie Gardner
- Music by: Murray Gold
- Series: Doctor Who Prom
- Running time: 7:30 minutes
- First broadcast: 27 July 2008; BBC iPlayer and BBC Radio 3 (audio only); 1 January 2009; BBC One

Chronology
← Preceded by "Journey's End"	Followed by → "The Next Doctor"

"Music of the Spheres" is an interactive mini-episode of the British science fiction television series Doctor Who that premiered at the Royal Albert Hall in London before the Intermission of the Doctor Who Prom on 27 July 2008, for which it was especially made. The Doctor Who Prom, including the audio for "Music of the Spheres", was broadcast simultaneously on BBC Radio 3. "Music of the Spheres" was shown on the official BBC Doctor Who website during the interval and the concert itself was filmed for later broadcast on BBC One on 1 January 2009.

The episode has live and pre-recorded components: the pre-recorded component takes place in the TARDIS; the live component is the Doctor Who Prom which took place during the episode's first transmission. Consequently, a major component of the episode is that it breaks the fourth wall: the Doctor (David Tennant) "converses" with the audience and conducts the orchestra to perform his symphony Ode to the Universe. He is antagonised by the Graske (Jimmy Vee), who intends to cause mischief at the Prom.

== Synopsis ==
The beginning of the episode depicts the Tenth Doctor composing Ode to the Universe: a symphony based on the "music of the spheres"—an aural representation of the Universe's gravity patterns. During the composition, a Graske teleports into the TARDIS to warn the Doctor about the imminent opening of a portal within the TARDIS. The Doctor approaches the portal, linking the TARDIS to the Doctor Who Prom at the Royal Albert Hall. He briefly converses with the audience and then conducts the orchestra in a performance before he realises the Graske has escaped into the Prom with his water pistol. He forces the Graske's return by "reversing the polarity of the neutron flow" and banishes him from the TARDIS, to the other side of the galaxy. At the end of the episode, he tells the viewer that the music of the spheres encompasses everyone, and that "Everyone's got a song inside them. Every single one of you."

== Production ==
Russell T Davies and Julie Gardner decided to create a "mini-episode" to be screened at the Doctor Who Prom in part because actor David Tennant was unable to participate in the live concert due to his commitments to the Royal Shakespeare Company's production of Hamlet. Davies incorporated interactive elements into his script to ensure that the live performance was "an event":

You can watch it later on the website, or on YouTube, or whatever, but frankly, you'll never know what it was really like unless you are in the Albert Hall on that day. It can never be captured again. And that's a reward for people who buy tickets and queue and travel.

— Russell T Davies

Davies sought to continue the Doctor's long association with music in this special after he realised the Tenth Doctor had yet to show "any aptitude for music". In his introductory note, Davies cites as examples of the Doctor's previous associations with music: the First Doctor disguising himself as Ancient Rome's most famous lyre-player in Emperor Nero's court in The Romans; the Second Doctor playing his recorder; the Third Doctor singing Aggedor to sleep with a Venusian lullaby in The Curse of Peladon; the Fourth Doctor shattering glass by singing in the style of Dame Nellie Melba in The Power of Kroll; the Fifth Doctor playing a harp on Gallifrey in "The Five Doctors"; the Sixth Doctor singing opera; the Seventh Doctor playing the spoons; the Eighth Doctor admiring composer Giacomo Puccini; and the Ninth Doctor dancing with Rose Tyler to "In The Mood" by Glenn Miller in "The Doctor Dances". In writing the episode, Davies expressed hope that "this mini-adventure [would show] that music can take any shape or form, whether it's singing, or playing the recorder, or even the spoons." He states that "music can go anywhere, reach anyone, and make better people of us all. Just like the Doctor."

The mini-episode was filmed on Saturday 3 May 2008, the last day of filming for Series 4 of Doctor Who, in the BBC Wales studios at Upper Boat, Pontypridd. Jimmy Vee, "a faithful friend of the show", was recalled to the part of the Graske he first portrayed in the interactive episode "Attack of the Graske". Murray Gold composed music especially for this short episode. Gold's Series 4 arrangement of the Doctor Who theme tune is used for the title sequence, and Ron Grainer and Delia Derbyshire's original version of the Doctor Who theme tune is played over the end credits.

== Broadcast and reception ==
=== Screening and broadcast ===
The episode premièred at the Royal Albert Hall before the interval of the Doctor Who Prom on Sunday 27 July 2008 and could be heard simultaneously on BBC Radio 3. It was also made available to watch during the interval on the official Doctor Who website and was shown on BBC One on 1 January 2009 as part of their showing of Doctor Who Prom. BBC Radio 3's recording of Doctor Who Prom including the audio of "Music of the Spheres" could be streamed via BBC iPlayer for a week after transmission.

Freema Agyeman, who played Martha Jones in Doctor Who and Torchwood, introduced the episode, which was shown on a large screen above the stage and smaller screens around the edge of the Dress Circle in the Royal Albert Hall. As the Doctor addressed them, the Royal Albert Hall audience shouted back responses. Manuscript paper fell to the stage as the Doctor was seen to feed his sheet music to the orchestra. When the Graske sneaked through the portal, he appeared in the audience carrying the Doctor's water pistol and squirting members of the audience. A cellist had to defend himself from an attack by the Graske who promptly exited as, on screen, the Doctor pulled him back to the TARDIS. The Graske in the audience was Jimmy Vee in costume and prosthetics.

"Music of the Spheres" was immediately followed by a Cyberman introducing the interval over applause. On BBC Radio 3, presenter Sarah Walker back announced the episode and announced its availability to watch during the interval on the official Doctor Who website. "Let's Do The Time Warp Again", presented by science fiction writer Justina Robson and produced by Mark Berman, was then broadcast on BBC Radio 3 during the interval in which Robson expressed her views about Doctor Who.

=== Reception ===
The Doctor Who Prom, described as "fantastic" by Davies, was attended by 6,000 people who were addressed directly in the "panto-style scene", "Music of the Spheres". Davies commented that they had "a brilliant time" and that "Music of the Spheres" involved "a lot of interaction with the audience". He also stated that the audience in the Royal Albert Hall had a "unique, one-off Doctor Who experience", repaying them for their effort in getting there and queuing in the heat.

Writing in The Times, Caitlin Moran said that the Doctor's homily to music and self-expression was "the most affecting moment" in the Prom, bringing "what could have been a wonderful, yet surreal and overwhelming introduction to orchestral music" down to "a rather lovely question. Did you like this orchestra, kids? What would you do with one?"
