= Planet of the Dead =

200 – "Planet of the Dead"
- Doctor Who episode

Cast
- Doctor: David Tennant – Tenth Doctor
- Companion: Michelle Ryan – Lady Christina de Souza
- Others: Lee Evans – Malcolm Taylor; Noma Dumezweni – Capt. Erisa Magambo; Adam James – D.I. McMillan; Glenn Doherty – Sgt. Dennison; Victoria Alcock – Angela Whitaker; David Ames – Nathan; Ellen Thomas – Carmen; Reginald Tsiboe – Lou; Daniel Kaluuya – Barclay; Keith Parry – Bus driver; James Layton – Sgt. Ian Jenner; Paul Kasey – Sorvin; Ruari Mears – Praygat

Production
- Directed by: James Strong
- Written by: Russell T Davies & Gareth Roberts
- Produced by: Tracie Simpson
- Executive producers: Russell T Davies; Julie Gardner
- Music by: Murray Gold
- Production code: 4.15
- Series: 2008–2010 specials
- Running time: 60 minutes
- First broadcast: 11 April 2009

Chronology
← Preceded by "The Next Doctor"	Followed by → "The Waters of Mars"

"Planet of the Dead" is the first of four special episodes of the British science fiction television series Doctor Who broadcast between mid-2009 and early 2010. It was simultaneously broadcast on BBC One and BBC HD on 11 April 2009 (Holy Saturday). The specials served as lead actor David Tennant's final stories as the Tenth Doctor. He is joined in the episode by actress Michelle Ryan, who plays Lady Christina de Souza, a one-off companion to the Doctor. The episode was written by Russell T Davies and Gareth Roberts, the first co-writing credit since the show's revival in 2005. The episode serves as the 200th story of Doctor Who.

The episode depicts Christina fleeing the police from a museum robbery by boarding a bus that accidentally travels from London to the desert planet of San Helios, trapping her, the Doctor, and several passengers on board the damaged vehicle. After the bus driver dies trying to return to Earth, the Unified Intelligence Taskforce, headed by Captain Erisa Magambo (Noma Dumezweni) and scientific advisor Malcolm Taylor (Lee Evans), attempt to return the bus while preventing a race of metallic stingray aliens from posing a threat to Earth. At the end of the episode, one of the passengers delivers a warning to the Doctor that "he will knock four times", foreshadowing the remaining three specials.

"Planet of the Dead" was the first Doctor Who episode to be filmed in high definition, after a positive reaction to the visual quality of spin-off series Torchwood and the financial viability of HDTV convinced the production team to switch formats. To ensure that the desert scenes looked as realistic as possible, the production team filmed in Dubai for three days, sending several props, including a 1980 double-decker Bristol VR bus, to the United Arab Emirates for filming. After a shipping container unintentionally damaged the bus in Dubai, Davies rewrote the script to explain the damage in the narrative.

The audience gave the episode an Appreciation Index of 88—considered "excellent."

== Plot ==
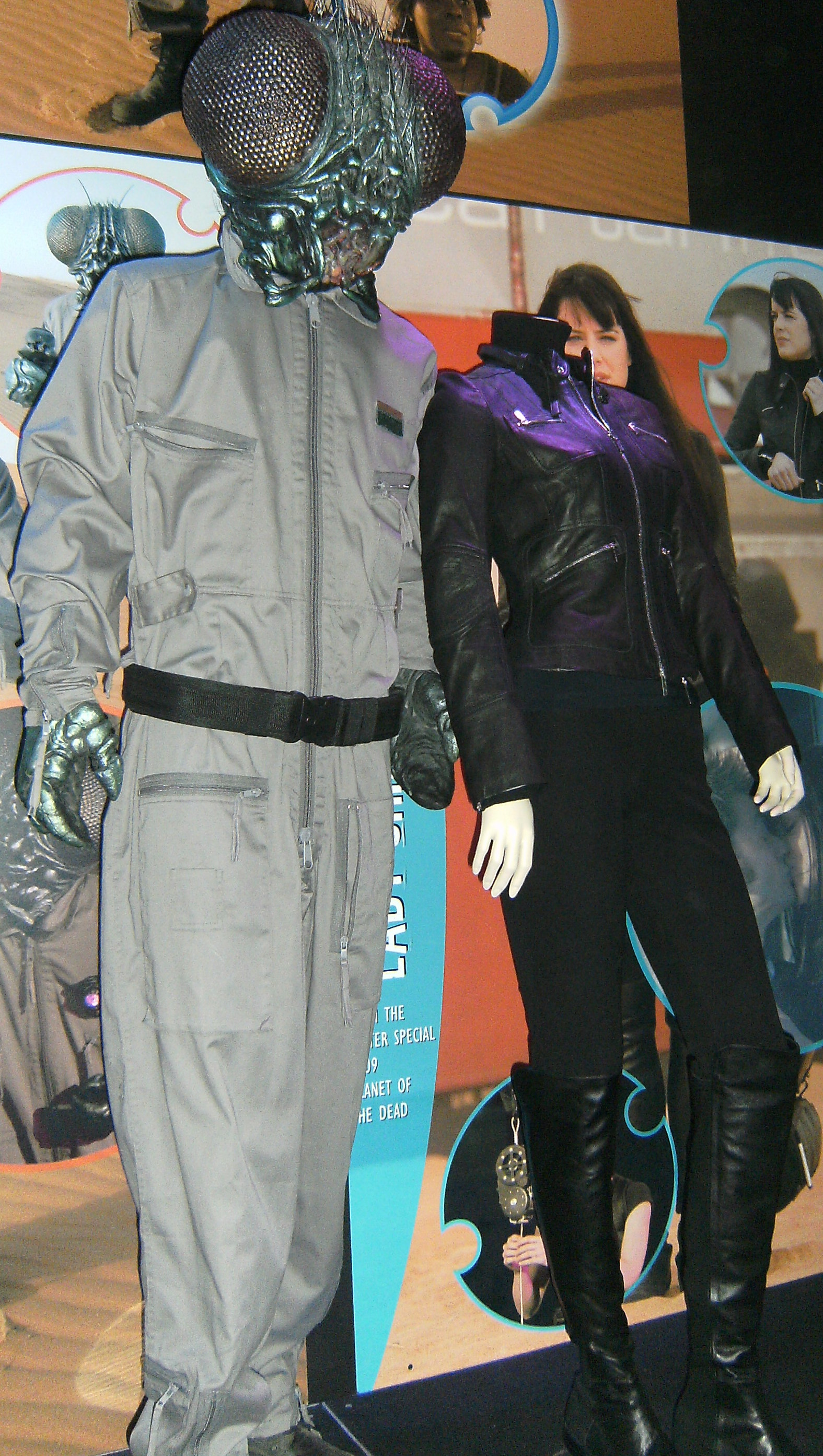
The Tritovores and the costume of Lady Christina at the Doctor Who Experience.

The gentlewoman burglar Lady Christina de Souza steals a gold chalice once belonging to King Æthelstan from a London museum and hops on a double-decker bus. The Tenth Doctor joins her and the other passengers, just before the bus passes through a wormhole and ends up on the sands of the planet San Helios. The Doctor studies the wormhole and determines that the bus protected them from its effects like a Faraday cage, but he is unable to stop the driver from stepping back through the wormhole. When the driver's burnt skeleton appears on Earth, UNIT forces are alerted, led by Captain Erisa Magambo and aided by scientific adviser Malcolm Taylor.

While the others attempt to repair the bus, the Doctor and Christina scout ahead and spot what appears to be a sandstorm on the horizon. They encounter two alien flies called Tritovores, who take them to their wrecked spaceship. They explain they were going to pick up supplies at San Helios, which had recently housed billions of people but now is totally deserted. The Doctor has them scan the approaching sandstorm and finds that it is actually a swarm of alien stingrays that are destroying the ecosystem. He suspects the swarm is generating the wormhole to travel to their next planet to feed upon, and they must hurry and close the wormhole before the aliens can reach Earth. Christina uses her burglary skills to retrieve a power crystal and its mounting from the Tritovore ship, but accidentally wakes an alien stingray, which consumes the Tritovores.

With the swarm nearly on them, the Doctor uses the crystal's mounting, an anti-gravity device, to enable the bus to fly. To control it, he persuades Christina to give him the gold chalice, which he smashes, using it to interface the bus's controls with the mountings. They fly back through the wormhole just as Malcolm closes it, but not before three stingrays sneak through, which UNIT quickly kill with Stinger missiles. Christina asks the Doctor to take her with him, but he refuses right before she is arrested. Carmen, a bus passenger who has low-level psychic abilities, warns the Doctor that his "song" is ending and "he will knock four times". As he departs, the Doctor allows Christina to escape from the police and fly off on the bus before they can stop her.

== Production ==
=== Writing and casting ===
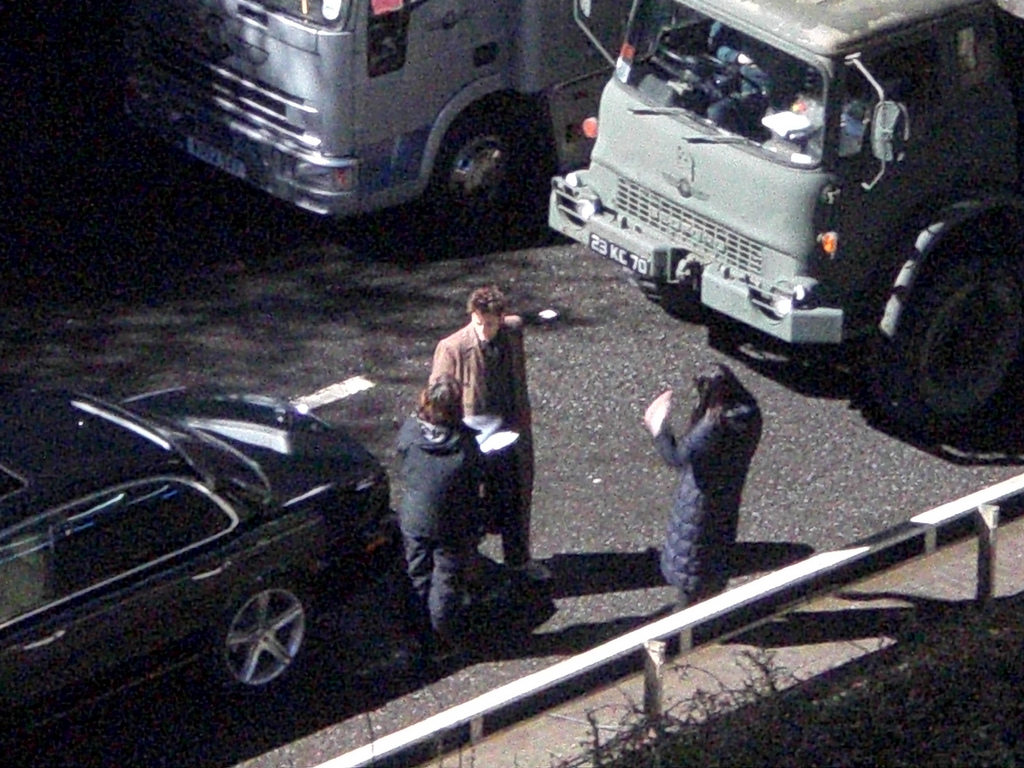
Ryan and Tennant reviewing the script before filming in Butetown at the Queen's Gate Tunnel on 28 January 2009.

Russell T Davies co-wrote the episode with Gareth Roberts, the first credited writing partnership for the show since its 2005 revival. "Planet of the Dead" was a departure from Roberts' usual stories—Roberts had previously only written pseudo-historical stories—and instead consisted of wild science fiction elements from his literary career and teenage imagination. The episode had no clear concept—such as Shakespeare and witches in "The Shakespeare Code" or Agatha Christie and a murder mystery in "The Unicorn and the Wasp"—and instead was a deliberate "clash [of concepts] with many disparate elements". Roberts explained he was cautious to ensure that each element had to "feel precise and defined ... like we meant that", citing the serial Arc of Infinity as an example where such control was not enforced. The episode includes a common feature of Davies' writing in that there is no clear antagonist: the Tritovore are eventually sympathetic to the protagonists and the stingrays are only following their biological imperative.

Unlike the Christmas specials, the theme of Easter was not emphasised in the story; the episode only contained a "fleeting mention" of the holiday instead of "robot bunnies carrying baskets full of deadly egg bombs". The episode's tone word—"joyous"—was influenced by Davies' realisation that "every story since 'The Fires of Pompeii' [had] a bittersweet quality" and his subsequent desire to avoid the recurring theme. The starting point for the story was Roberts' first novel The Highest Science. Davies liked the image of a train on a desert planet and rewrote the train as a bus. Davies nevertheless emphasised it was not an "adaptation as such" because tangential elements were constantly being conceived and added.

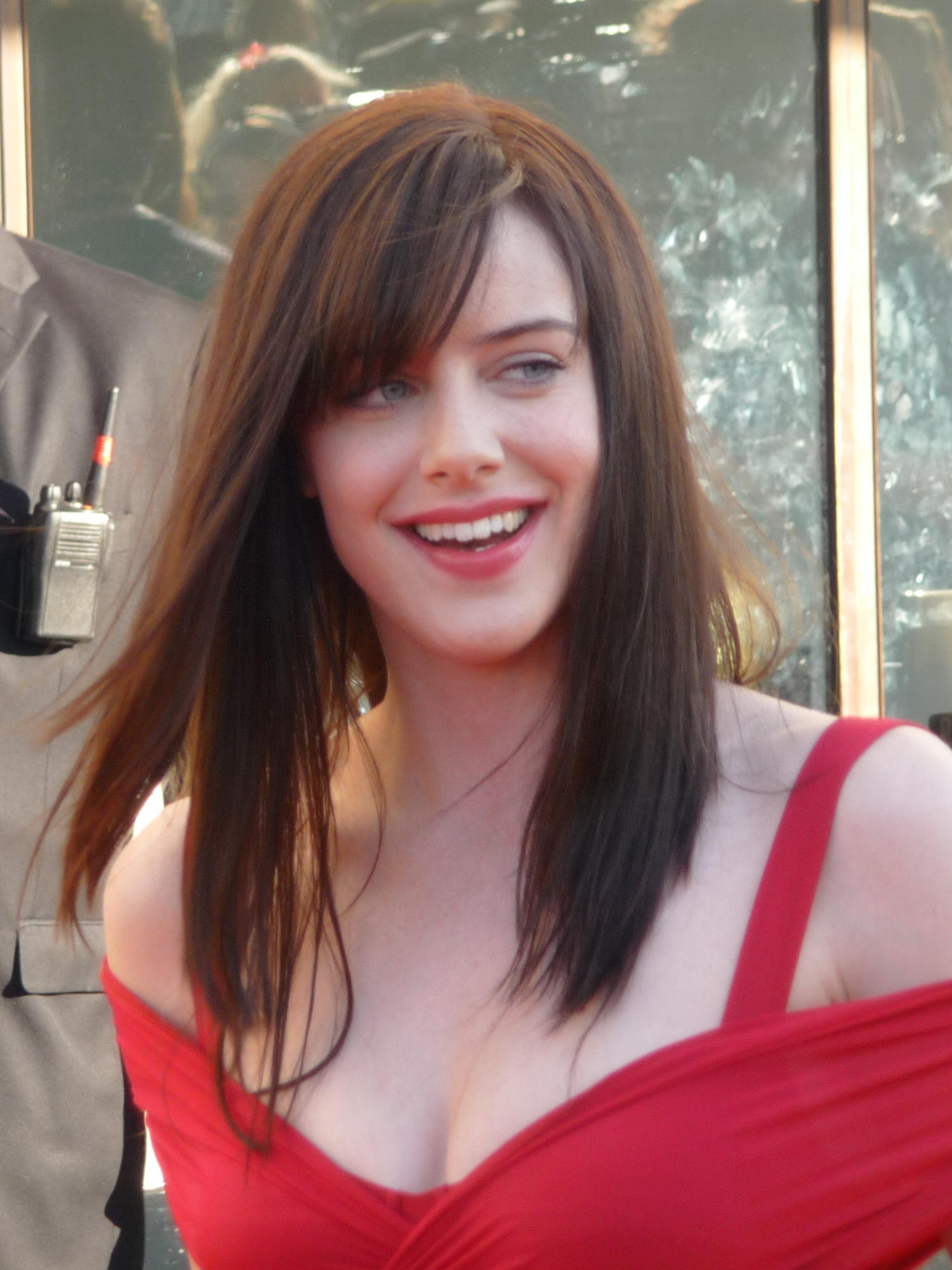
Michelle Ryan, who played Lady Christina de Souza

Michelle Ryan's casting as Lady Christina de Souza was confirmed by the BBC on 23 January 2009 and attracted media attention owing to Ryan's recent relatively high-profile roles in EastEnders, Jekyll, Bionic Woman and Merlin. Ryan stated that she is "a huge fan of Doctor Who and [was] very excited to be joining David Tennant and the Doctor Who team." Davies commented that "Michelle is one of the most sought after young actors in the country" and that they were "delighted to announce that she [would] be joining the team." Ryan described her casting as a "real honour", noting that she "love[s] the character".

Ryan was rumoured to be in line for a role as full-time companion to the incoming Eleventh Doctor (Matt Smith) and her casting in "Planet of the Dead", combined with her previous working history with incoming Executive Producer Steven Moffat – the two working together on Jekyll, fuelled speculation that she might return to Doctor Who accompanying the Eleventh Doctor in Series 5. It had been reported that Ryan auditioned to replace Billie Piper in the companion role when her character, Rose Tyler, left in 2006, but was unsuccessful; Ryan subsequently stated that this was false.

Ryan was interviewed by BBC News about her role as Lady Christina. Ryan praised her colleagues and the "family atmosphere" on set and described Doctor Who as "really something special to do". On 9 April 2009, Ryan guested on Steve Wright in the Afternoon on BBC Radio 2 and on The Justin Lee Collins Show on ITV2 to promote "Planet of the Dead". After a showing of a trailer for the episode on The Justin Lee Collins Show, Ryan described the "fantastic" time she had filming in Cardiff and in Dubai.

Ryan's character Lady Christina de Souza is an adrenaline junkie and thief. Christina is a typical Doctor Who companion, Davies electing to draw parallels from the Time Lady Romana rather than new series companion Rose Tyler. Roberts described her as an "adventuress" who is "upper class and glam, suited and booted, and extremely intelligent" which the Doctor could relate to because they both rejected their heritages. The episode's director James Strong described the character as reverting to a traditional romantic-based companionship—rather than the platonic companionship of Donna Noble (Catherine Tate) in the fourth series—while still being a unique companion:

It's back to basics: she's probably more of a traditional, romantic kind of Thomas Crown Affair kind of heroine, if you like. [...] It echoes to me of Rose, in that there may be a good old fashioned romantic connection between them. She's young, she's beautiful, she's sexy, but whereas Rose was a very ordinary, normal girl, Lady Christina is a lady, she comes from a very privileged, very elite background. She's different from any of the companions we've ever had in that she doesn't particularly want to get caught up with the Doctor. She's got her own thing going on, so she's very much a match for the Doctor and very much an equal. Often in an adventure the Doctor will take control and everyone will do what he says. She's very much in control – the two of them are in a sparring way, battling against each other to get through this adventure.

— James Strong, Digital Spy interview.

Comedian Lee Evans plays Professor Malcolm Taylor, a UNIT scientist devoted to his predecessor, the Doctor. Davies created Evans' character to serve as a foil for Noma Dumezweni's pragmatic character Captain Erisa Magambo, who previously appeared in the episode "Turn Left". Roberts noted after writing the episode that Evans' character had unintentionally become a "loving" caricature of Doctor Who fandom.

The episode was influenced by several works: Davies described "Planet of the Dead" as "a great big adventure, a little bit Indiana Jones, a little bit Flight of the Phoenix, a little bit Pitch Black."; the relationship between the Doctor and Christina was influenced by 1960s films such as Charade and Topkapi, which included Cary Grant and Audrey Hepburn "being witty and sophisticated together, and then running for their lives"; and the Tritovore were influenced by 1950s and 1970s science fiction B-movies such as The Fly and Davies' habit of including aliens that were recognisable to the audience as animals from Earth, such as the Judoon. Carmen's warning evoked memories of the Ood's warning to the Doctor and Donna in the fourth series episode "Planet of the Ood". Tennant explained the prophecy meant that the Doctor's "card [had become] marked" and the three specials would thus be darker—characterising "Planet of the Dead" as the "last time the Doctor gets to have any fun"—and that the subject of the prophecy was not the obvious answer:

David Tennant
Really, from this moment on, the Doctor's card is marked. Because when we come back in "The Waters of Mars", it's all become a little bit darker.
Julie Gardner
And as we know, David, he really does knock four times.
Tennant
Yeah, absolutely, and if you think you've figured out what that means, you're wrong!
Gardner
But when you do figure it out, it's a sad day.

— David Tennant and Julie Gardner, Doctor Who: The Commentaries, "Planet of the Dead"

=== Filming ===
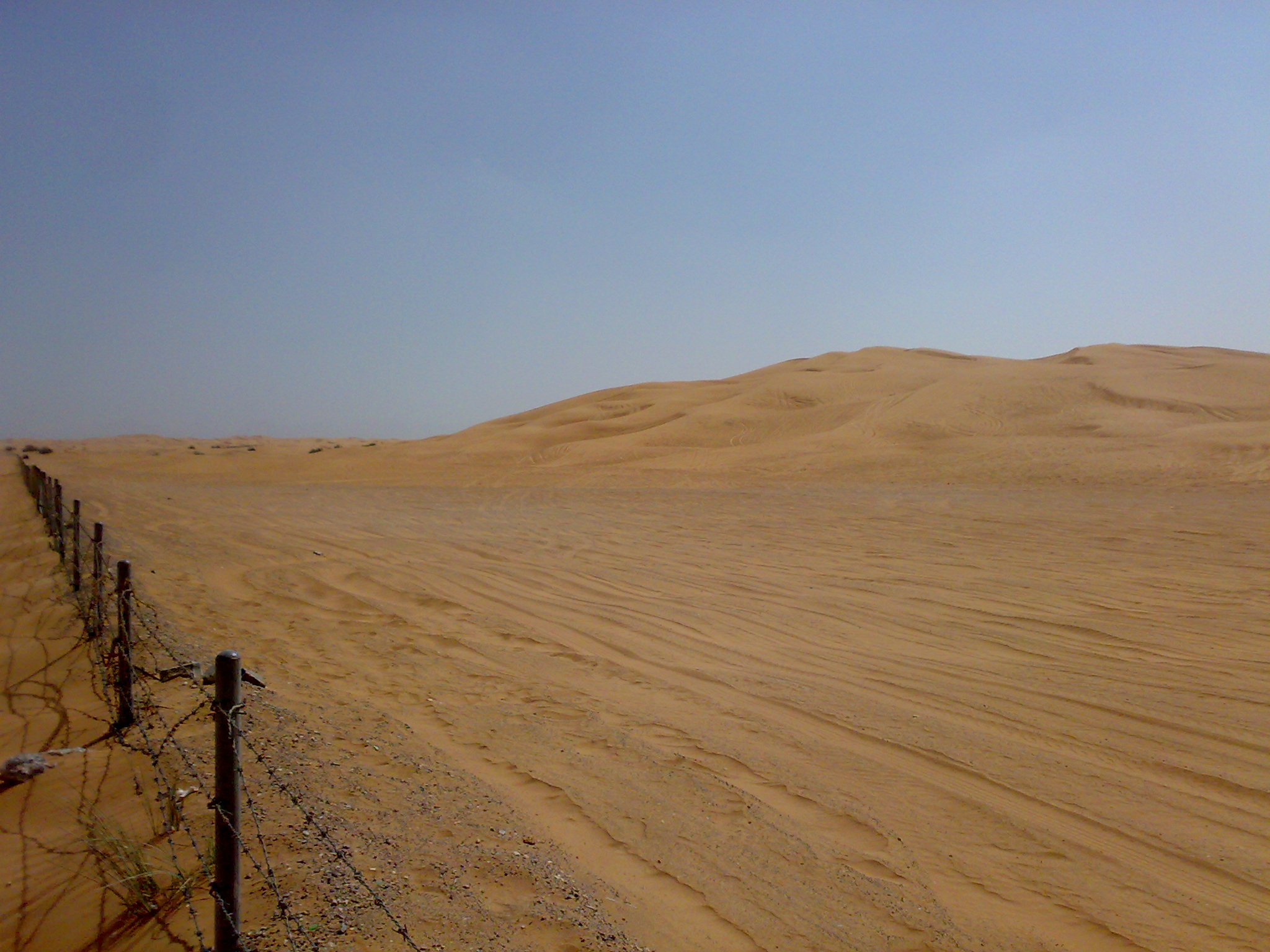
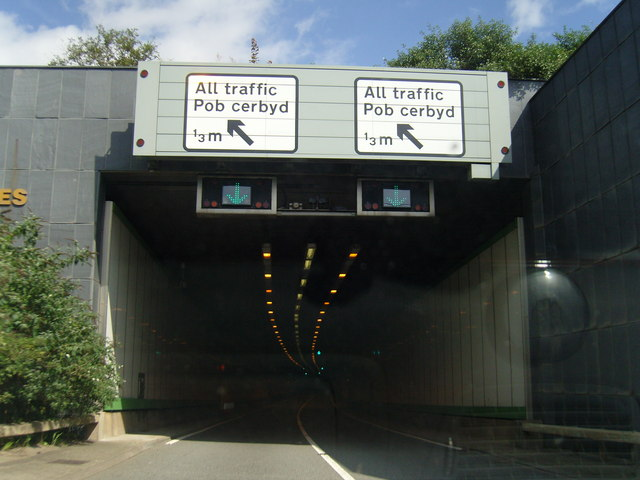
The two major filming locations of the episode: the desert of Dubai was used for scenes on the "planet of the dead"; and the Queen's Gate Tunnel in Butetown, Cardiff was used for the majority of Earth-bound scenes.

Pre-production on the four specials started on 20 November 2008—four days before scheduled—because the episode's overseas filming in Dubai required the extra planning time. Two weeks later, the production team was on a recce for the special and the final draft of the script was completed. The production team examined overseas locations to film the episode because they wanted the scenery to feel "real" and thought that they would be unable to film on a Welsh beach in winter. After examining countries such as Morocco and Tunisia, the production team decided to film in Dubai because the area was more amicable to the filming industry and viable filming locations were nearer to urban areas than other locations.

Production began on 19 January in Wales. The special was the first Doctor Who episode to be filmed in high-definition television resolution. The move to HD had previously been resisted for two major reasons: when the show was revived in 2005, high-definition television had not been adopted by an adequate portion of the audience to be financially viable; and special effects were considerably more expensive to create in high-definition than in standard-definition. "Planet of the Dead" was used as a switch to HD because of the show's reduced schedule in 2009 and because the filming crew had become experienced with the equipment while they were filming Torchwood.

Filming began at the National Museum Cardiff, (Note: National Museum Cardiff (International Gallery): 51.4866°N 3.1709°W) which doubled for the history museum depicted in the episode's first scene. To portray the tunnel the bus travelled into, the Queen's Gate Tunnel of the A4232 road in Butetown (Note: Queen's Gate Tunnel (Gladwall Tunnel): 51.4622°N 3.1708°W) was closed for four nights to accommodate filming. The last major piece of filming in Wales took place in the closed Mir (formerly Alphasteel) steelworks in Newport, (Note: Mir Steelworks (Tritovore Spaceship): 51.5578°N 2.9628°W) which doubled almost unaltered for the Tritovore spaceship. Scenes set in London's Oxford Street were filmed at St Mary Street, Cardiff. Filming took place at the peak of the February 2009 Great Britain snowfall, where the sub-zero temperatures slowed filming and had a visible effect on the cast. To accommodate for the adverse conditions, Davies included a line in the script that specified that the Tritovore spaceship cooled as external temperatures increase.

The 200 bus—so named after the episode's landmark—in dock at Dubai City Port, after a container was accidentally dropped on it.

Filming in Dubai (Note: Dubai Desert (The Planet of the Dead): 24.919°N 55.624°E) took place in mid-February 2009. Two weeks previously, one of the two 1980 Bristol VR double-decker buses bought for filming had been substantially damaged when a crane accidentally dropped a container in Dubai City Port. After an emergency discussion by the production team, they agreed that the damage was unintentionally artistic and decided to include the damaged bus in the episode; instead of shipping the spare bus from Cardiff—which would have delayed the already hurried filming schedule—the production team decided to partially reconstruct the bus in Dubai, damage the spare bus in Cardiff to match the bus in Dubai, and rewrite part of the script to accommodate and mention the damage to the bus. James Strong recalled the reaction of the production team to the damage to the bus in an issue of Doctor Who Magazine:

One morning in the first week of February, I was leaving my flat when Julie Gardner phoned. She said, "there's been a little accident with the bus [...] it's a disaster; the bus is fucked." When I got into the office, I was handed a photograph–and my initial reaction was absolute horror. We called an emergency meeting. Russell came in [...] and we discussed our options. We had bought an identical London bus to film on in Cardiff, so could we send that out to Dubai? We could have got it out in time if it'd left Cardiff, literally, the next day, but we'd have had to find a third bus, an exact replica, to film on in Cardiff a week later. It had taken us a month to find the one we had. It was even mooted that we'd have to forget Dubai and opt for a beach in the UK. But Russell's response was "Okay, let's embrace it. Let's say that the bus was damaged on its way to the alien planet. [...] He wove it into the narrative. We're not trying to hide the damage at all. In fact, we show it off, enhancing it with special effects, smoke and sparks. It works rather marvellously. That London bus, damaged and smoking, in the middle of the desert–yeah, it looks incredible, especially in gorgeous hi-def.

— James Strong, Doctor Who Magazine issue 407.

A notable use of lens flares being used in the episode for artistic effect. Strong sought to maximise—rather than minimise—effects such as these because it disguised the fact it was filmed in a studio and allowed the viewer to suspend their disbelief more easily; this specific shot was highlighted by Strong and Tennant as an example of how it was correctly utilised.

The damaged bus was not the only problem to filming in Dubai: the first of the three days was afflicted by a sandstorm which left most of the footage shot unusable. The production team then struggled to complete three days of filming in two days; the last day was compared to "filming Lawrence of Arabia". To complete the episode's filming, interior scenes in the bus were filmed in a studio in Wales. To disguise the fact they were using a translite, a 360-degree background image, Strong utilised often-avoided techniques such as muddied windows and lens flares; the latter also served to create a warmer environment for the viewer. After filming ended, editing and post-processing took place until two days before transmission, leaving the BBC to resort to using an unfinished copy to market the episode.

=== 200th story ===
"Planet of the Dead" was advertised as Doctor Who's 200th story. Writer Russell T Davies admitted that the designation was arbitrary and debatable, based upon how fans counted the unfinished serial Shada, the season-long fourteen-part serial The Trial of a Time Lord, and the third series finale consisting of "Utopia", "The Sound of Drums" and "Last of the Time Lords". Davies personally disagreed about counting The Trial of a Time Lord as one serial—arguing that it "felt like four stories" to him—and grouping "Utopia" with its following episodes, but agreed that it was only an opinion which did not override any others. Gareth Roberts inserted a reference to the landmark—specifically, the bus number is 200—and Davies emailed the show's publicity team to advertise the special as such. Doctor Who Magazine's editor Tom Spilsbury acknowledged the controversy in the magazine's 407th issue, which ran a reader survey of all 200 stories.

== Broadcast and reception ==
Overnight figures estimated that the special was watched by 8.41 million people, a 39.6% share of the audience. An additional 184,000 watched the programme on BBC HD, the channel's highest rating at that time. The initial showing had an Appreciation Index of 88: considered excellent. A BBC One repeat, two days later, gained an overnight figure of 1.8 million viewers. The special was therefore the second most watched programme of the day, beaten only by the premiere of the new series of Britain's Got Talent. The final viewing figure for the initial broadcast was 9.54 million viewers on BBC One and 200,000 viewers on BBC HD, making it the fifth most watched programme of the week and the most watched programme aired on BBC HD at that time. Including repeats in the following week and viewings on the BBC iPlayer, 13.89 million viewers watched the episode in total.

The episode received average critical reviews. Simon Brew of science fiction blog Den of Geek said the episode was "by turns ambitious and predictable" but "still quite entertaining". The first part of the review mentioned an objection from his wife that the bus trapped in the sand "[looked] really fake", despite the episode being actually filmed in Dubai, and then mentioned Brew's appreciation of the concept of people stranded in the desert and concluded that "made a fair fist of it". Brew positively reviewed Michelle Ryan's performance—believing it similar to her role in Bionic Woman than to her role as Zoe Slater in EastEnders—and Lee Evans' performance as Malcolm Taylor, calling him the highlight of the episode because of his dialogue. He closed his review by saying that "'Planet of the Dead' was passable enough": he thought it "never really gelled" for him; but he thought it was overall entertaining and was excited for the remaining three specials as a result of Carmen's prophecy.

Charlie Jane Anders of io9 "mostly loved 'Planet of the Dead'", commenting that it was a standard Russell T Davies script:

POTD was pretty much everything you've come to expect from Russell T. Davies' Who: crazy adventures, slightly cartoony characters, clever dialogue, moments of sheer silly fun, a childlike solemnity, a miraculous save, bombastic music, and one woman who's held up as being the most special person ever. It didn't hurt that POTD had all the elements of a cracking good story: The Doctor and friends trapped on an alien planet, on the other side of the universe, with no easy way to get home. Alien creatures who might be hostile. A deadly swarm coming to tear our heroes apart. And UNIT on the other side of the wormhole, trying to come to grips with this almost unimaginable threat.

She compared it to two previous episodes, "The Impossible Planet" and "Midnight", both of which she enjoyed. She criticised three aspects of the episode: Lady Christina, who was the "first [Russell T Davies] heroine who actually filled [her] with revulsion", leaving her hoping that the character would be killed off-screen, Malcolm's reluctance to close the wormhole and the implausibility of only three stingrays travelling through it. She thought that the episode was "a pretty solid adventure with a cool set of monsters".

Ben Rawson-Jones of entertainment website Digital Spy gave the episode two stars out of five. He characterised the episode as being "as hollow as a big chocolate Easter egg" because it was "lacking in the enthralling drama and compelling characterisation that has been the lynchpin of the Russell T Davies era". His main criticism was towards Ryan's character, describing the romantic tension between Christina and the Doctor as "feeling forced" and arguing that Ryan was "utterly unconvincing" as Christina. Conversely, he was appreciative of Strong's direction and the UNIT subplot. Specifically, he approved of Evans' performance, noting that "the fact that Malcolm names a unit of measurement after himself is both inspired and hilarious". His review ended by describing the episode as "lifeless for much of the hour" and expressing his hope that the ambiguous entity from Carmen's premonition would "hurry up".

Orlando Parfitt of IGN gave the episode a 7.1 (Good) rating out of ten. Parfitt called it a "straightforward story" that did not elevate to the level of excitement typically seen in Doctor Who until the episode's climax, instead describing the majority of the story as being "taken up with Tennant and Ryan standing in the desert, swapping flirtatious banter in between proclaiming how dire their situation is", and criticised the writing of the part of the episode where the bus was on San Helios, claiming that plot devices such as the Tritovore or Taylor being held at gunpoint and ordered to close the wormhole as "feel[ing] forced and unnaturally shoe-horned into the script". His praise of the episode went to Ryan and Evans: although he thought of Christina as a "shameless Lara Croft ripoff", he said that the character "still proves a sexy and wise-cracking counterpart to the Doctor"; and Evans' acting alongside Dumezweni highlighted his "undeniably great comic acting" as opposed to his "love-it-or-hate-it" stand-up comedy. The last paragraph of his review focused on the climax, which he thought was "a cracker [that] just-about makes up for the previously plodding plot", and described the entire episode as having "enough enjoyable moments" to entertain fans before the transmission of "The Waters of Mars".

"Planet of the Dead" was nominated for the Hugo Award for Best Dramatic Presentation, Short Form, but lost to "The Waters of Mars".

=== International broadcast ===
The special aired in Canada in July on Space, and in the US on BBC America on 26 July 2009. In Australia, the Special aired 31 May 2009, on ABC1. In South Africa, the special aired on 18 October 2010, on BBC Entertainment.

== Legacy ==
In 2018, Ryan began reprising her role as Lady Christina in her own Big Finish Productions spinoff audio drama series.
