= Jimmy Vee =

Scottish actor (born 1959)

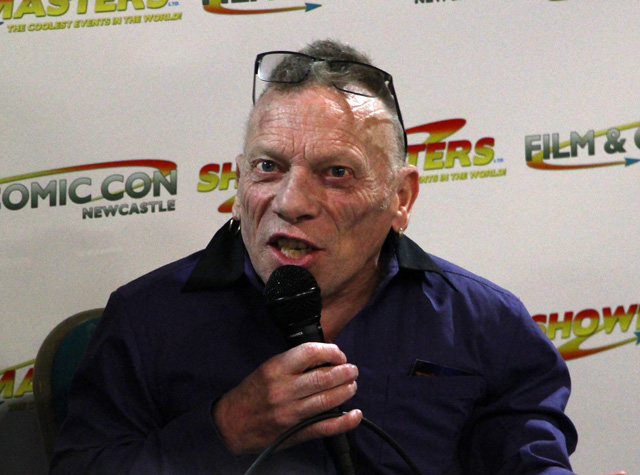
- Vee at Comic Con, Newcastle in 2016
- Born: 3 February 1959 (age 67); Scotland
- Occupation: Actor
- Years active: 1997–present
- Height: 110 cm (3 ft 7 in)

James Vee (born 3 February 1959) is a Scottish actor. He is best known for playing a number of Doctor Who monsters and aliens including Bannakaffalatta in the 2007 Christmas special Voyage of the Damned, as well as the Graske in the Doctor Who spin-off series The Sarah Jane Adventures. He is also well known as the actor for R2-D2 in Star Wars: The Last Jedi, replacing the late Kenny Baker, who died in August 2016.

== Career ==
Vee started his career as a stunt double/performer for various small actors and extras in films such as Harry Potter and the Philosopher's Stone.

Vee also starred as Cheeky the dwarf in the King's Theatre, Glasgow adaptation of Snow White and the Seven Dwarves.

Vee originally auditioned for R2-D2 in Star Wars: The Force Awakens, although filming clashed with Pan at the time and Vee was not used. In November 2015, he was cast as R2-D2 in Star Wars: The Last Jedi, succeeding Kenny Baker before his death in August 2016.

== Filmography ==
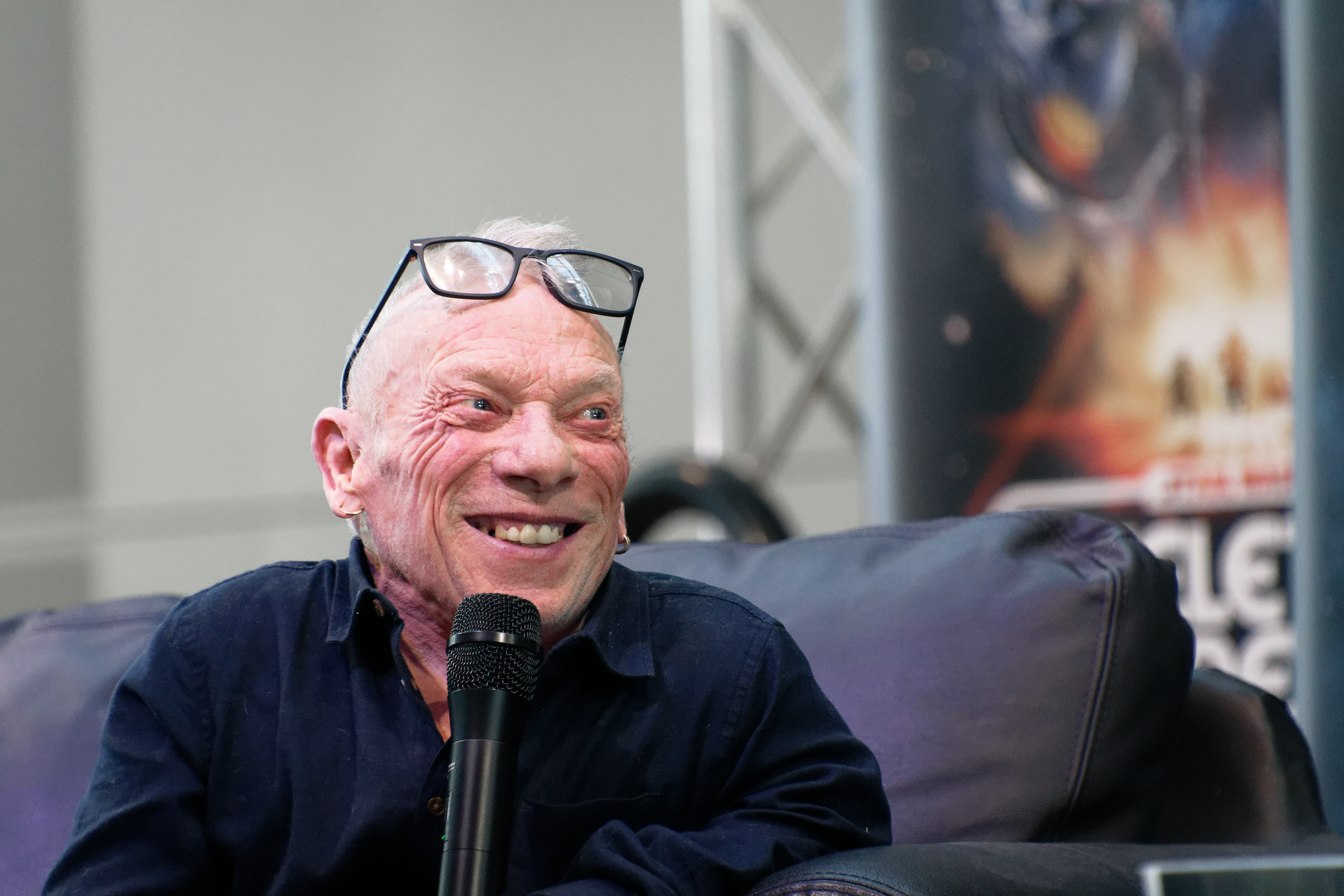
Vee at Comic Con, Stuttgart in 2024

=== Films ===
Year	Title	Role	Notes
2001	Harry Potter and the Philosopher's Stone	Goblin	Uncredited
2007	Skins: Secret Party	Digger	Short film
2009	Kilt Man	Midget	Short film
2010	Harry Potter and the Forbidden Journey	Goblin	Video
2014	The Hogwarts Express	Goblin	Video
2014	Harry Potter and the Escape from Gringotts	Gringotts Goblin	Video
2015	Pan	Lofty	
2017	Dark Ascension	Evil Dwarf	
2017	Star Wars: The Last Jedi	R2-D2	
2018	Train Set	Randy	
2018	Solo: A Star Wars Story		Creature and droid puppeteer
2019	Rocketman	Arthur	
2020	Artemis Fowl	Goblin (uncredited)	
2022	Bite	Dog Fight MC	

=== Television ===
Year	Title	Role	Notes
2001	Weirdsister College	The Gargoyle	Episode: "The Gargoyle"
2005, 2007, 2014	Doctor Who	Moxx of Balhoon; Space Pig; Graske (multiple); Bannakaffalatta; Skovox Blitzer	Episodes: "The End of the World" "Aliens of London" "Attack of the Graske" "Voyage of the Damned" "The Caretaker"
2007–2010	The Sarah Jane Adventures	Chris Slitheen; The Graske; Groske; Nathan Slitheen	Episodes: Revenge of the Slitheen; Whatever Happened to Sarah Jane? The Lost Boy; The Temptation of Sarah Jane Smith "From Raxacoricofallapatorius with Love"; The Gift; Death of the Doctor
2008	Music of the Spheres	Graske	Doctor Who interactive mini-series
2017	Trust Me	Mr. Kennedy	Episode #1.3
2022	The Witcher: Blood Origin	Dwarf Banker	S1:E2 "Of Dreams, Defiance, and Desperate Deeds"
