= Jackie Tyler =

Fictional character from Doctor Who

- Doctor Who character
- First appearance: "Rose" (2005)
- Portrayed by: Camille Coduri
- Duration: 2005–2006, 2008, 2010

In-universe information
- Affiliation: Ninth Doctor; Tenth Doctor
- Spouse: Pete Tyler (husband)
- Children: Rose Tyler (daughter)
- Home era: Early 21st century

Jackie Tyler is a fictional character played by Camille Coduri in the British science fiction television series Doctor Who. The character, a resident of contemporary London, is introduced in the first episode of the 2005 revival as the mother of Rose Tyler, a travelling companion of the alien time traveller the Doctor. Jackie is a recurring character during Series 1 and 2 and later makes guest appearances in Series 4 and the 2010 New Year’s special, The End of Time. The character has also appeared in expanded universe material such as the Doctor Who New Series Adventures novels and the Doctor Who Magazine comic strip.

Within the series narrative, Jackie is a widow who lives alone with her daughter Rose until Rose leaves her mundane life behind to travel through time and space with the Doctor. Jackie's feeling of loss and of being left behind is explored in subsequent episodes. As the character is brought into danger by her proximity to the Doctor, she resents his influence over Rose. However, once he undergoes a regeneration, effectively becoming a new man, Jackie realises how much he cares for Rose and begins to have a more cordial relationship with him. The character was written out at the end of the 2006 series, along with Rose, in a storyline which sees them trapped in a parallel universe where Jackie forms a new relationship with an alternate version of her deceased husband Pete Tyler. She later returns in the finale of the fourth series in order to help the Doctor.

In reviving the television series after a sixteen-year hiatus (1989–2005), executive producer Russell T Davies was keen to provide a believable background for the Doctor's companion and a context for her travels to the past and future. The character of Jackie was created, along with Rose's on/off boyfriend Mickey, to keep the series grounded in reality. In writing Jackie, Davies incorporated both comic and tragic elements. Following the departure of the Tyler family, Davies was keen to bring Jackie back alongside Rose for future appearances. Reviewers generally reacted positively to the development of the character, though some identified unlikeable traits.

== Appearances ==
=== Television ===
Jackie is introduced in "Rose" (2005) as the late-thirties single mother of the episode's eponymous character, Rose Tyler (Billie Piper). After the Ninth Doctor (Christopher Eccleston) arrives at Jackie's flat in search of Rose, Jackie attempts to seduce him. She is later attacked by shop window dummies but is saved when Rose and the Doctor destroy the alien consciousness able to control plastic. When Rose returns to London, twelve months have passed; in the intervening year Jackie had organised a missing person campaign to search for her daughter and accused Rose's boyfriend Mickey Smith (Noel Clarke) of murder. She also suspects the Doctor of being an internet predator. She learns the truth about Rose's new life after battling the Slitheen and being present with Mickey as he organises a missile strike to destroy the aliens. The episode "Father's Day" depicts two younger versions of Jackie also played by Coduri. It is shown that whilst Rose was a child (Julia Joyce) Jackie told her idyllic stories of her deceased father, Pete (Shaun Dingwall). Rose attends her parents' marriage, in which Pete is unable to recite Jackie's full name, Jacqueline Andrea Suzette Prentice, and after then travelling ahead to 1987, learns that her father was a failed entrepreneur and that her parents' marriage had been stormy; Jackie suspects Pete is an adulterer and also threatens him with divorce. In the 2005 series finale, "The Parting of the Ways", Jackie is glad to have Rose home after the Doctor returns her to the 21st century from the far future in order to protect her. She is persuaded to help return Rose to save the Doctor after Rose mentions her encounter with her father, reminding Jackie that he would try anything rather than give up.

In the 2005 Christmas day episode "The Christmas Invasion" Jackie is bewildered by the Doctor's new incarnation (David Tennant) and concerned about the side-effects of his regeneration. When he recovers, Jackie is happy for Rose to resume travelling with him. In "Rise of the Cybermen" and "The Age of Steel" (2006) Coduri plays a parallel universe Jackie, who is rich and famous because of the parallel Pete Tyler's success. This version of Jackie is intent on maintaining a facade; she hides the fact her marriage is deteriorating, denies turning forty and chastises Rose for speaking to her whilst posing as staff. Rose and the parallel universe Pete try to save her when the Cybermen invade, but she is killed during the attack. In "Love & Monsters", Jackie expresses how hard and lonely it has been to be left behind by her daughter. After learning a romantic interest, Elton Pope (Marc Warren), only befriended her to track Rose and the Doctor, Jackie, she throws him out of her house, stating a priority to defend the Doctor and Rose. In "Army of Ghosts" Jackie is unwillingly taken in the TARDIS, the Doctor's time machine, to the Torchwood Institute where he brings her on an investigation. In "Doomsday", due to invading Cybermen from the parallel universe, the walls between universes break down and Jackie meets the parallel universe version of Pete. The defeat of warring Cybermen and Dalek armies results in Jackie being sent to the parallel universe, where Rose is also later trapped. In the epilogue it is mentioned that Jackie is in a relationship with Pete and expecting a baby.

In the series four finale episode "Journey's End" (2008), Jackie returns to her original earth with Mickey in order to find Rose, who has travelled back to stop the Daleks destroying reality. Comfortable carrying a large gun, Jackie blows up a Dalek to save former companion Sarah Jane Smith (Elisabeth Sladen). After a half-human genetic clone of the Doctor wipes out the Daleks, Jackie returns to the parallel universe with Rose, who is tasked with healing the new Doctor. It is revealed that Jackie and Pete now have a young son named Tony. Jackie cameos in David Tennant's final story, "The End of Time" when the dying Tenth Doctor visits the Powell estate on New Year's Day 2005 to bid a final farewell to Rose, telling her she will have a really great year..

=== Literature ===
Jackie appears in several of the Ninth and Tenth Doctor New Series Adventures novels. In Winner Takes All by Jacqueline Rayner, published in May 2005, Jackie falls for a scheme to take humans "on holiday" to fight in an alien war. A thug who lives in Rose's estate mugs Jackie and takes the "winning ticket" that qualifies her for the trip. Jackie ends up in hospital, but her assailant fares worse: he takes her place as a remote-controlled soldier on an alien planet, and is killed. Jackie makes cameo appearances in Only Human by Gareth Roberts and The Stealers of Dreams by Steve Lyons published in September 2005. In Only Human, a time-lost Neanderthal flirts with Jackie at a London nightclub before Captain Jack Harkness steers him away from her (Jack is helping the Neanderthal adapt to life in the present as the time machine that sent him to the future disrupted his physiology so that he can't be sent back), feeling that Jackie would not appreciate further Doctor-related strangeness in her life. In The Stealers of Dreams, Rose uses the "superphone" to call Jackie from a human colony world in the future. Jackie complains that Rose did not let her know she was going to be in Cardiff during her recent visit to that city. Jackie appears in the introductory section of The Stone Rose, released in April 2006, in which she and Mickey alert the Doctor and Rose to a strange statue of Rose in the British Museum. Released the same month, The Feast of the Drowned by Stephen Cole, is set wholly on contemporary earth and explores the context of Jackie's relationship with Rose further. When Rose is captured by the malevolent "waterhive", Jackie is targeted by ghostly apparitions seeking to lure her to the same fate.

Jackie also appears in the Doctor Who Magazine comic strip "The Green-Eyed Monster" in which she and the Tenth Doctor feign a romantic relationship in order to free Rose from possession by a creature that feeds on jealousy.

=== Audio drama ===
Following the folding of AudioGO and Big Finish's acquisition of the new series license, Billie Piper and David Tennant reprised their roles as Rose Tyler and the Tenth Doctor in Doctor Who: The Tenth Doctor Adventures. Coduri reprised her role as Jackie in the story titled Infamy of the Zaross, released in November 2017, where she calls the Doctor and Rose for help when an alien invasion strikes Norwich while Jackie is visiting friends. During this encounter Jackie is teleported up to an alien ship, and overhears crucial information about the Zaross's masters that reveal their true nature. Cordui narrated two short trips titled The Siege of Big Ben and Flight into Hull which depict Jackie working with the Meta-Crisis Doctor; Siege shows Jackie doubting the Meta-Crisis Doctor after he lies to a woman who wanted to use time travel to save her dead husband, and Flight depicts the Meta-Crisis Doctor and Jackie facing another alternate version of Jackie trying to escape her dying world. Coduri featured in the Ninth Doctor Chronicles alongside Piper and Adam Mitchell (Bruno Langley), where she is manipulated into helping sell a new fad that turns out to be a tool of an alien invasion. She also returns in Rose Tyler – The Dimension Canon, where she plays both the "prime" Jackie Tyler now living in Pete's World and two alternate versions of herself, including a world where she and Pete were never married and a world where Pete created a technology that is powered by the life energies of the deceased.

== Development ==
=== Casting and concept ===
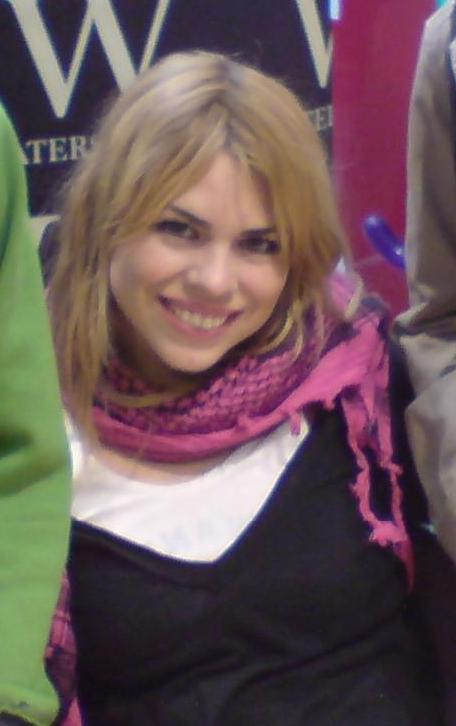
Members of the production team noted a resemblance between Coduri and Piper (pictured).

In creating Rose as a new companion for the 2005 revival of Doctor Who executive producer and lead writer Russell T Davies felt that it would be necessary to examine the questions of "do her family miss her?" and "has she gone missing?" which he believed to be unavoidable questions. Davies created Jackie and Mickey and provided a story structure that would see Rose return frequently to them in order to make her "real" and to "give her a life". In Davies' original pitch for the series, Jackie was initially named Judy Tyler. The roles of Jackie and Mickey were cast alongside other guest characters for the 2005 series' first production block including Joseph Green and Indra Ganesh from "Aliens of London" and "World War Three". Camille Coduri was suggested to casting director Andy Pryor and the other members of the production team by executive producer Mal Young. Both producer Phil Collinson and executive producer Julie Gardner felt that Coduri and Billie Piper (Rose) physically resembled each other and this aided the portrayal of their mother/daughter relationship. Discussing Coduri's casting, Collinson stated that she "understood what Jackie was, from the very first scene she read". Coduri was already "very familiar" with Davies' work as writer and executive producer and so "was very excited and quite terrified" about being part of the series because of her level of respect for him.

Coduri felt Jackie to share similarities with herself, insofar as she is "very protective of [her] children" and a "bit gobby". The Doctor Who Annual 2006, published in August 2005, gives further background information on Jackie in an article written by Russell T Davies. Davies states that Jackie supports herself financially by working occasionally from home as a hairdresser. In the Journal of Commonwealth Literature Lindy A. Orthia observes that the "giro-collecting" Jackie is part of the group of companions introduced in Davies' era of Doctor Who that are "drawn from a cosmopolitan vision" in that they are all "black, queer and/or working class." Orthia contends that whilst working-class companions had featured previously in the show "none were unskilled workers nor chronically under- or unemployed like Rose, Donna and Jackie."

=== Character development ===
Piper felt that in series one the relationship between Rose and Jackie is "like any mother-daughter relationship" in that as much as Rose loves her mother "there's also this resentment there" because Jackie tries to stop her "moving forward". Despite sometimes writing Jackie as a comic character, Davies chose to examine the sadder aspects of her character such as her loneliness and unwillingness to let Rose go. In his book The Writer's Tale, Davies expresses his contention that comedy and sadness are often inseparable and states that though "Jackie Tyler makes us laugh" he knew he would "uncover something sad at the heart of her". He argues that even as far back as "Rose" Jackie is "holding Rose back" citing her suggestion her daughter work in a butcher's shop. Discussing Jackie's attempted seduction of the Doctor, Coduri stated that her character "has the hots for him" and in general "loves the company of men and is always looking for Mr Right". Promoting her role in the 2005 Christmas special, Coduri describes Jackie as being "not very good in a crisis" and "a bit of a screamer" in contrast to Rose who is adept at saving the world. Andy Pryor believes that Coduri's acting ability influenced the writing decisions regarding the character in the second series. He felt Jackie' actions in the second series were "incredibly moving" as a result of Coduri's acting range. Gardner concurred, stating in 2006 that "she's grown in performance, episode by episode". In the commentary for "Army of Ghosts" Davies expresses delight at having Jackie aboard the TARDIS. He stated that he had been "dying" to have Jackie take Rose's place for an episode. To explain Torchwood not realising that Jackie was not Rose, Davies amended the script for "Love & Monsters" to mention that Torchwood's files on Rose had been corrupted by the "Bad Wolf" virus. Ahead of 2006 series finale "Doomsday" Coduri expected the character of Jackie to be killed off in a "comic but sad moment." She was therefore pleasantly surprised to discover that the character would be sent to live in a parallel universe instead.

Davies had planned for the character to return in the fourth series finale since the episodes were first conceived and had asked Coduri to keep four weeks free for filming. In January 2008, whilst still writing the scripts, Davies became afraid that there was not space for the character. Her appearance was set to be reduced to a single scene at 'Bad Wolf Bay' at the end of "Journey's End". He also was concerned that because the character has a young son it would not have made dramatic sense for her "to enter a bloody battlezone." Eventually, he decided to pair the character with Mickey and Sarah Jane and reasoned that seeking her daughter provided enough motivation for her to get involved in the conflict. Returning to the series in 2008 for "Journey's End", Coduri initially felt it was "weird" to be playing Jackie again. She describes Jackie as being "braver" in this episode but frightened of "losing Rose full stop." When asked in 2011 whether she would return to the series, Coduri stated that she would return if asked but felt it was not likely because she had already "been back to say goodbye at least twice" and believes that the story has been wrapped up.

== Reception ==
James Chapman, author of the book Inside the Tardis: The Worlds of Doctor Who, identifies the presence of Jackie and Mickey as part of Davies attempt to "create a social context" for Rose. In a 2006 essay entitled "Jackie Tyler Leaves the TV On", television writer and author Paul Cornell notes that whilst some fans would rather see less time devoted to Rose's family, Jackie is emblematic of a section of the revival of Doctor Who's target demographic. Kay McFadden of The Seattle Times felt the character to be "antic" and "overbearing" in the premiere episode, whilst SFX described the character's appearance in "The End of the World" as a "wonderful moment" that reminded the audience of the context of the adventure. Charles McGrath of The New York Times, in a review of "Rose" and "The End of the World", described Jackie as "vain" and "slutty". In their unauthorised guide to the revival of Doctor Who Graeme Burk and Robert Smith? identify "Aliens of London" and "World War Three" as a turning point in the character from comic relief to a character the audience "are invested in and care about". For the authors, the moment where Jackie and Mickey stand behind "Rose's mad dream" in "The Parting of the Ways" is the "stand up and cheer moment to end them all".

SFX reviewer Nick Setchfield praised Davies' "populist voice" in relation to Jackie's characterisation in "Love and Monsters" stating "there's something just right about Jackie seducing Elton to the Asda charms of Il Divo." He commented that the script provided something "genuinely moving about Jackie's desperation" which was "well played by Coduri". Similarly, IGN's Ahsan Haque felt that Jackie 's "attention seeking attraction towards Elton was handled extremely well." Burk and Smith? identify Jackie's "because it's hard" speech as "Coduri's best acting in the series, bar none" opining that the actress "infuses her scenes with comic brilliance, wistful reflection and raw anger, all in the space of several minutes". They felt that Davies keeps "[her] humorous elements intact and shows us the bittersweet pain that underpins it." In his review of "Army of Ghosts" Arnold T Blumberg, writing for Now Playing magazine, observes that the character "gets to be a companion for a little while" and "does a damn fine job of it too." Burk and Smith? list the simultaneous reunion and first meeting between Jackie and Pete in "Doomsday" as one of the episode's poignant moments, stating that the scene "sings joyously" through the performances of Coduri and Dingwall. Commenting on Jackie's involvement in "Journey's End" Travis Fickett observed that having the Doctor tell her to stay away from the TARDIS console was "a fun moment", although he felt that having so many characters present in the episode was "a bit awkward." Dave Golder of SFX stated that there being "not enough Jacqui [sic]" was one of the episode's low points.

Reviewers also compared the character of Donna Noble's mother, Sylvia (Jacqueline King), who featured semi-regularly during the fourth series, against Jackie. Airlock Alpha's Alan Stanley Blair remarked upon the premiere of "Partners in Crime" that Sylvia "doesn't have the same appeal" as Jackie. Charlie Jane Anders of io9 comments that until the episode "Turn Left" Sylvia seemed like "a weak copy of Jackie Tyler" who lacked Jackie's "saucy warmth." Of her role in the series, Jon Wise of People magazine opined that Coduri "adds a certain sexiness" to the role of Rose's mum. In an interview with Coduri, Gay Times magazine stated that she is "beloved" by members of the gay community because of her role as Jackie, something the actress felt was a "privilege". The exposure given to Coduri whilst playing the role led to her being recognised frequently on the street. The actress commented that she also received "heaps of fan mail, mostly from men" which verged more on the "respectful, romantic side than the drop-your-drawers side".
