= Rise of the Cybermen =

172a – "Rise of the Cybermen"
- Doctor Who episode

Cast
- Doctor: David Tennant – Tenth Doctor
- Companions: Billie Piper – Rose Tyler; Noel Clarke – Mickey Smith
- Others: Camille Coduri – Jackie Tyler; Shaun Dingwall – Pete Tyler; Roger Lloyd-Pack – John Lumic; Andrew Hayden-Smith – Jake Simmonds; Don Warrington – The President; Mona Hammond – Rita-Anne; Helen Griffin – Mrs Moore; Colin Spaull – Mr Crane; Paul Antony-Barber – Dr Kendrick; Adam Shaw – Morris; Andrew Ufondo – Soldier; Duncan Duff – Newsreader; Paul Kasey – Cyber-Leader; Nicholas Briggs – Cyber-Voice

Production
- Directed by: Graeme Harper
- Written by: Tom MacRae
- Produced by: Phil Collinson
- Executive producers: Russell T Davies; Julie Gardner
- Music by: Murray Gold
- Production code: 2.5
- Series: Series 2
- Running time: 1st of 2-part story, 45 minutes
- First broadcast: 13 May 2006

Chronology
← Preceded by "The Girl in the Fireplace"	Followed by → "The Age of Steel"

"Rise of the Cybermen" is the fifth episode of the second series of the British science fiction television programme Doctor Who, which was first broadcast on BBC One on 13 May 2006. The episode introduces a terrestrial reinvention of the Cybermen, as well as a parallel universe which would serve as a recurring plot element in the series. It is the first part of a two-part story, the concluding part being "The Age of Steel", broadcast on 20 May.

The episode is set in the parallel universe's version of London. In the episode, the businessman John Lumic (Roger Lloyd-Pack) seeks to "upgrade" all of humanity into Cybermen by placing their brains inside metal exoskeletons.

The episode was directed by Graeme Harper, who became the first and so far only person in the show's history to have directed episodes in both the original and revived runs of the series: he previously directed the critically acclaimed serial The Caves of Androzani in 1984, and Revelation of the Daleks in 1985.

The episode was the first Doctor Who story to feature the Cybermen in the show's 2005 revival. They last appeared 18 years prior in Silver Nemesis.

== Plot ==
The Tenth Doctor, Rose, and Mickey Smith crash land in London on a parallel Earth. The trip has caused all of the TARDIS apart from a small power cell to die. The Doctor energises the cell with some of his own lifeforce. The cell needs 24 hours to fully recharge before the group can return home, so they decide to explore. Rose is shocked to see a billboard with her father Pete's picture on it, knowing that her real father died when she was an infant. (Note: As depicted in the 2005 episode "Father's Day".) Mickey heads off on his own to try to find his grandmother Rita-Anne, who died in his universe years earlier after falling down stairs. The Doctor and Rose discover that most of the population of London wear EarPod devices that feed information directly into the wearer's brain from Cybus Industries, which owns Pete's health drink company Vitex.

Meanwhile the head of Cybus Industries, John Lumic, tries and fails to gain approval from the President of Great Britain for his plan to "upgrade" humanity by placing their brains into metal exoskeletons. Unknown to everyone else, Lumic has already been secretly turning homeless people into Cybermen. Cybus is being investigated by a group called the Preachers, who have been receiving secret information about Lumic's technology from "Gemini". Jake Simmonds, one of the Preachers, witnesses a group of homeless people being lured into lorries to be converted and goes to collect help. Jake finds Mickey at his grandmother's house, and confuses him with his parallel counterpart, Ricky. Jake takes Mickey to the Preachers' base where Ricky and Mickey meet. After some initial distrust, Mickey decides to join the Preachers as they follow the Cybus lorries that kidnapped the homeless to Pete's mansion, which is hosting the birthday party of his wife, Jackie, who did not have a child in this universe and instead gave the name "Rose" to her dog.

Rose and the Doctor also investigate the party and disguise themselves as caterers. The Cybermen break into the mansion and surround the guests, with the intention of upgrading all of them into Cybermen. The Cybermen kill the President for refusing, followed by other partygoers. The Doctor, Rose, and Pete escape the house and encounter Mickey and the Preachers outside. As the group is surrounded by Cybermen, the Doctor and his group surrender. The Cybermen tell them that they are "incompatible" and will be deleted.

== Production ==
Doctor Who Magazine #368 confirmed that this story was inspired by the Big Finish Productions audio play Spare Parts. Russell T Davies had previously described (along with The Holy Terror) as "some of the finest drama ever written for any genre, in any medium, anywhere." Spare Parts author, Marc Platt, received a fee and was credited in the end titles ("With thanks to Marc Platt"), and there is an allusion in the dialogue with Mickey labelling himself a "spare part." However, writer Tom MacRae noted that his television story was not a simple rewrite of Spare Parts: "My story isn't the same — it's got a different setting, different themes, and different characters, 'cause once we started talking, the whole thing developed in a very different direction. But as Russell says, we wouldn't have started this whole line of thinking if he hadn't heard Spare Parts in the first place."

Early drafts of this story featured "Body Shops", where wealthy people would purchase new cybernetic limbs. Davies vetoed this element because he found it unbelievable. He also instructed Tom MacRae to tone down the differences between the parallel universe versions of characters and their "real" universe counterparts. "I think it was one of those great lessons about the freedom of SF, as well as its greatest dangers, because when you're creating a parallel world, you suddenly get excited by saying everyone can wear eye patches," said Davies, referring to the alternative Brigadier Lethbridge-Stewart in Inferno. According to Graeme Harper on the episode commentary, the pre-credits sequence was written by Russell T Davies as he was not satisfied with the original opening. In the commentary, it is noted that Jackie's "40th" birthday is a reference to the 40th anniversary of the broadcast of The Tenth Planet, the first appearance of the Cybermen.

Location shooting took place at the Coal Exchange and Mount Stuart Square, Cardiff Bay. The external shots of the chimneys and many of the internal shots were taken at Uskmouth Power Station in Newport. Mickey sports a large tattoo on his right bicep; according to actor Noel Clarke's commentary, the tattoo was make-up applied for the episode.

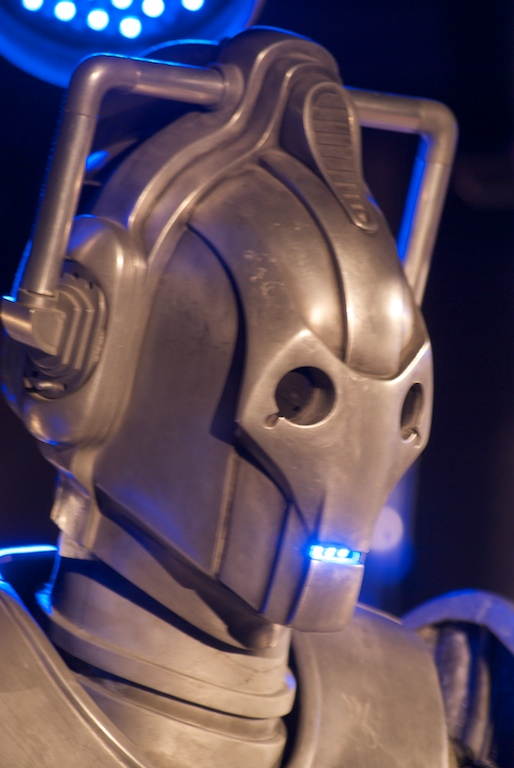
The redesigned Cybermen

The Art Deco look of the 2006 Cybermen design follows that from the web cast Real Time. According to the episode commentary, director Graeme Harper wanted an Art Deco feel to the parallel universe Earth. Art Deco costumes had previously been used for the K1 Robot in Robot (1974) and for much of the cast (including robots) in The Robots of Death (1977). The Art Deco design, as well as the robotic movements of the Cybermen, are reminiscent of Fritz Lang's Metropolis.

Unlike the two-part stories from the 2005 series, this episode featured no "Next time" trailer for the next episode — only a title card reading "To be continued...", the first time the phrase has ever been used to end an episode in the programme's history. The production team had stated previously that one episode in this series was so long that there was no time for a preview. Many viewers, and writer Steven Moffat, had criticised the use of a preview for "World War Three" at the end of the 2005 episode "Aliens of London" as it spoiled the dramatic cliffhanger ending. Beginning with "The Impossible Planet", trailers for the second part of stories were run during the middle eight, after the main credits, to allow viewers time to switch off.

Official BBC websites include cybusindustries.net, cybusfitness.co.uk and internationalelectromatics.co.uk. Other similarly named websites are run by fans. The BBC also registered the following domain names: cybusindustries.com, cybusindustries.co.uk, cybusfinance.com, cybusfinance.co.uk, cybusproperty.com and cybusproperty.co.uk. The BBC also created the website henriksonline.co.uk for the department store Rose had worked at in the episode "Rose". Its bookstore includes the images of both John Lumic's book "Man of Steel" and Jackie Tyler's biography "The Strong Survive".

=== Cast notes ===
Colin Spaull played the role of Lilt in Revelation of the Daleks, which was also directed by Graeme Harper. Spaull is the sixth actor to appear in both the original series and the revival. He also appeared in the audio play Grand Theft Cosmos as Henrik. Don Warrington, who plays the President, previously provided the voice for Time Lord founder Rassilon in the Doctor Who audio plays Seasons of Fear, Neverland, and Zagreus produced by Big Finish Productions. Helen Griffin later appeared in the audio play Cobwebs. Paul Antony-Barber later played Ludovic Comfort in the audio play The Magic Mousetrap.

Graeme Harper is the first director to have directed stories in the original and new series of Doctor Who, having previously directed The Caves of Androzani and Revelation of the Daleks. As seen in Doctor Who Confidential episode "Cybermen", the actors playing the Cybermen went through extensive choreographing to perfect their movements.

Roger Lloyd-Pack and David Tennant previously worked together in Harry Potter and the Goblet of Fire, playing father and son, Barty Crouch Sr. and Barty Crouch Jr. respectively.

Roger Lloyd-Pack broke his leg just days before filming began on the episode. Writer Tom MacRae told Doctor Who Magazine in issue #369 that this did not necessitate any rewriting: the script had always had Lumic in a wheelchair as this became part of his motivation for creating the Cybermen given that he was in a wheelchair and dying and wanted to prolong his life. Roger Lloyd-Pack told The Daily Mirror that he based the character of Lumic on Donald Rumsfeld: "I thought, 'Who is a power-hungry mad person who believes he is completely right and has a lot of control?' Donald Rumsfeld came to mind. He's as bad a man as I see around now."

== Broadcast and reception ==
Although scheduled to be broadcast in the UK from 7:00 to 7:45 p.m., the episode was broadcast from 7:23 p.m. due to the overrunning of the FA Cup Final. The corresponding episode of Doctor Who Confidential was subsequently delayed until "Rise of the Cybermen" had aired. Overnight viewing figures for this episode averaged 8.6 million (39.7% share), peaking at 9.65 million. The audience Appreciation Index was 86. Its final viewing figure was 9.22 million, making it the sixth most watched programme of the week.

This episode was released together with "The Age of Steel" and "The Idiot's Lantern" as a "vanilla" DVD with no special features, and later as part of the complete Series 2 boxed set.

Digital Spy's Dek Hogan reacted positively to "Rise of the Cybermen", describing the new Cybermen as "stunning, not only looking fantastic but being genuinely scary at the same time". He particularly praised how the storyline "ties in with our obsession with upgrading everything" and that Noel Clarke was given more to do. Ahsan Haque of IGN gave the episode a rating of 8.5 out of 10, feeling that it "delivers both in scope and with some great dialogue". Haque was especially positive to the return of the Cybermen and the focus on Mickey and Rose. Nick Setchfield of SFX gave the two-parter a positive review, highlighting Harper's direction which he felt added imagination and menace to the Cybermen and the parallel universe. However, he felt that Lloyd-Pack's performance was too over-the-top for the current "subtler" incarnation of Doctor Who, which made him come across as "jarringly two-dimensional".

A critical monograph on the Cybermen's iconic marching sound and the use of music within the episodes by Anne Cranny-Francis was published in 2009. In the essay she "analyzes the meanings of sound" and the "relationships between humans and technology", arguing that the episode's use of music, such as the 1961 hit "The Lion Sleeps Tonight", links "the unethical use of technology...with the progressive narrative of secular societies" and draws parallels between the Cybermen's iconic march to themes of "aggression, loss of individuality, and dictatorial order" and the "boot stamping on the human face" from George Orwell's Nineteen Eighty-Four.
