= Harriet Jones =

Doctor Who character

- Doctor Who character
- Introducing herself in "The Stolen Earth", 2008
- First appearance: "Aliens of London"; 16 April 2005
- Last appearance: "The Stolen Earth"; 28 June 2008
- Created by: Russell T Davies
- Portrayed by: Penelope Wilton

In-universe information
- Occupation: Prime Minister of the United Kingdom; First Lord of the Treasury; Minister for the civil service Member of Parliament for Flydale North
- Affiliation: Ninth Doctor; Tenth Doctor; Torchwood Institute; Various companions

Harriet Jones is a fictional character played by Penelope Wilton in the long-running British science fiction television series Doctor Who. Having worked previously with lead writer and executive producer Russell T Davies, Wilton was keen to involve herself with his 2005 revival of Doctor Who after he sought to cast her. Jones is introduced in the two-part story "Aliens of London" and "World War Three" as a Member of Parliament who aids the Ninth Doctor against an alien invasion of London. The episode establishes a running joke associated with the character which would see her frequently introduce herself by holding up her ID and stating her name and position; in subsequent episodes this was usually met with the response "Yes, I/we know who you are," even occurring with the Daleks and the Sycorax.

Wilton returned for the series' 2005 Christmas special as Davies wanted to include a familiar character whose presence would ease the transition following a change in the series' lead actor. Despite her character having been introduced as fair-minded and hard-working, Harriet is depicted as an uncompromising Prime Minister, which led to comparisons to real-life politicians. Response to the character's political decisions prompted mixed commentary from the media; some reviewers felt that the character had acted unreasonably whilst others sympathised with her actions and felt her scripted political demise was unjust.

Wilton's last appearance in 2008 coincided with producer Phil Collinson's final episodes; she was keen to make a final return as she had been there for Collinson's first episodes as producer. Harriet is killed off in the penultimate episode of the show's fourth series in which she sacrifices her own life to help prevent a Dalek takeover of Earth. Harriet's final scenes were designed to complete a tripartite story arc and to give the character redemption.

== Appearances ==
=== Series 1 ===
Harriet Jones is introduced in the 2005 episode "Aliens of London" as an MP for the fictional constituency of Flydale North. Her political party is not stated, although she describes herself as "hardly one of the babes", "just a faithful backbencher". She is caught up in events investigated by the Ninth Doctor (Christopher Eccleston) and his companion Rose Tyler (Billie Piper) in London when an alien spacecraft crash-lands and the Cabinet is infiltrated by an alien 'Raxicoricofallapitorian' family known as the Slitheen. She finds herself trapped with the Doctor and Rose inside 10 Downing Street, and as the only elected representative present, she gives the Doctor the order to launch a Harpoon missile, destroying the building but killing the Slitheen who were about to trigger a nuclear war. The Doctor tells Rose that Harriet is destined to be elected as Prime Minister for three successive terms and be the architect of a period known as Britain's "Golden Age".

Harriet returns in the 2005 Christmas special "The Christmas Invasion", set several months later when the character is now Prime Minister. Harriet oversees the launch of the Guinevere Space Probe which is captured by an invading Sycorax spaceship. Although the invasion is thwarted by the Doctor (now played by David Tennant), Harriet orders the covert Torchwood organisation to destroy the retreating Sycorax ship, arguing that there will come a time when the Doctor cannot protect Earth and so she must do what she can to defend it. The Doctor reacts furiously to what he perceives as cold-blooded murder and tells her that he can bring her down with just six words, which he whispers to her aide: "Don't you think she looks tired?", planting the seed of doubt in the aide's and the public's mind. In the episode's dénouement, Harriet faces rumours of ill health and a looming vote of no confidence. In the 2006 episode "Doomsday" an alternate Harriet Jones from Pete Tyler's world was mentioned to have become President of Great Britain after the Cybermen attack in "The Age of Steel" with The Doctor warned Pete to keep an eye on her. In the 2007 episode "The Sound of Drums" it is stated that the Master, campaigning to become prime minister under the alias Harold Saxon, appeared right after Harriet's downfall.

=== Series 4 ===
Harriet makes a final appearance in the 2008 episode "The Stolen Earth" where it is revealed she has continued to work in defence of Earth, maintaining that she was correct in not abdicating responsibility for Earth's protection to the Doctor. As the Earth surrenders to an invading army of Dalek warships, Harriet uses a sentient "subwave" network to connect with other allies of the Doctor. The network was created by the Mr. Copper Foundation for a time when—as Harriet had predicted—the Doctor would fail to protect the Earth in a time of crisis. With the aid of Jack Harkness (John Barrowman) and Sarah Jane Smith (Elisabeth Sladen), Harriet amplifies the subwave signal broadcast from her own home, allowing the Doctor to return to Earth at the expense of her own location becoming visible to the Daleks. As a trio of Daleks approach her, she proclaims defiantly that they will fail as they know nothing of humanity; the Daleks then exterminate her. Rose informs the Doctor of Harriet's sacrifice in the following episode, "Journey's End".

The 2017 poetry book Now We Are Six Hundred, written by James Goss and illustrated by Davies, includes a poem revealing that Harriet escaped from the Dalek attack.

== Casting and character development ==
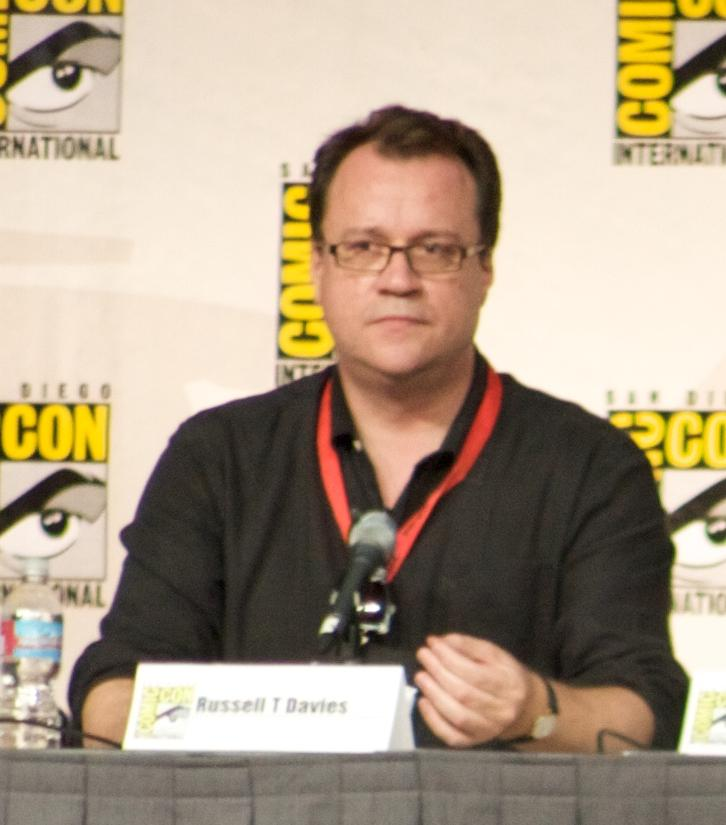
Russell T Davies (2009)

The role of Harriet Jones was written specially for Penelope Wilton by the series' lead writer and executive producer Russell T Davies. Wilton was drawn to the role after working with Davies on his show Bob and Rose and being impressed by his writing. Commenting on Jones's role in the two-part "Aliens of London"/"World War Three", Wilton characterised her as "straight as a die" and "the kind of caring politician that anyone would like to have." When faced with the deadly Slitheen, Wilton remarks that she demonstrates "tremendous resilience and courage.". At the end of the episode the Doctor remembers that Harriet will one day become prime minister. Speaking in April 2005, Wilton expressed interest in returning to the series to explore the character further.

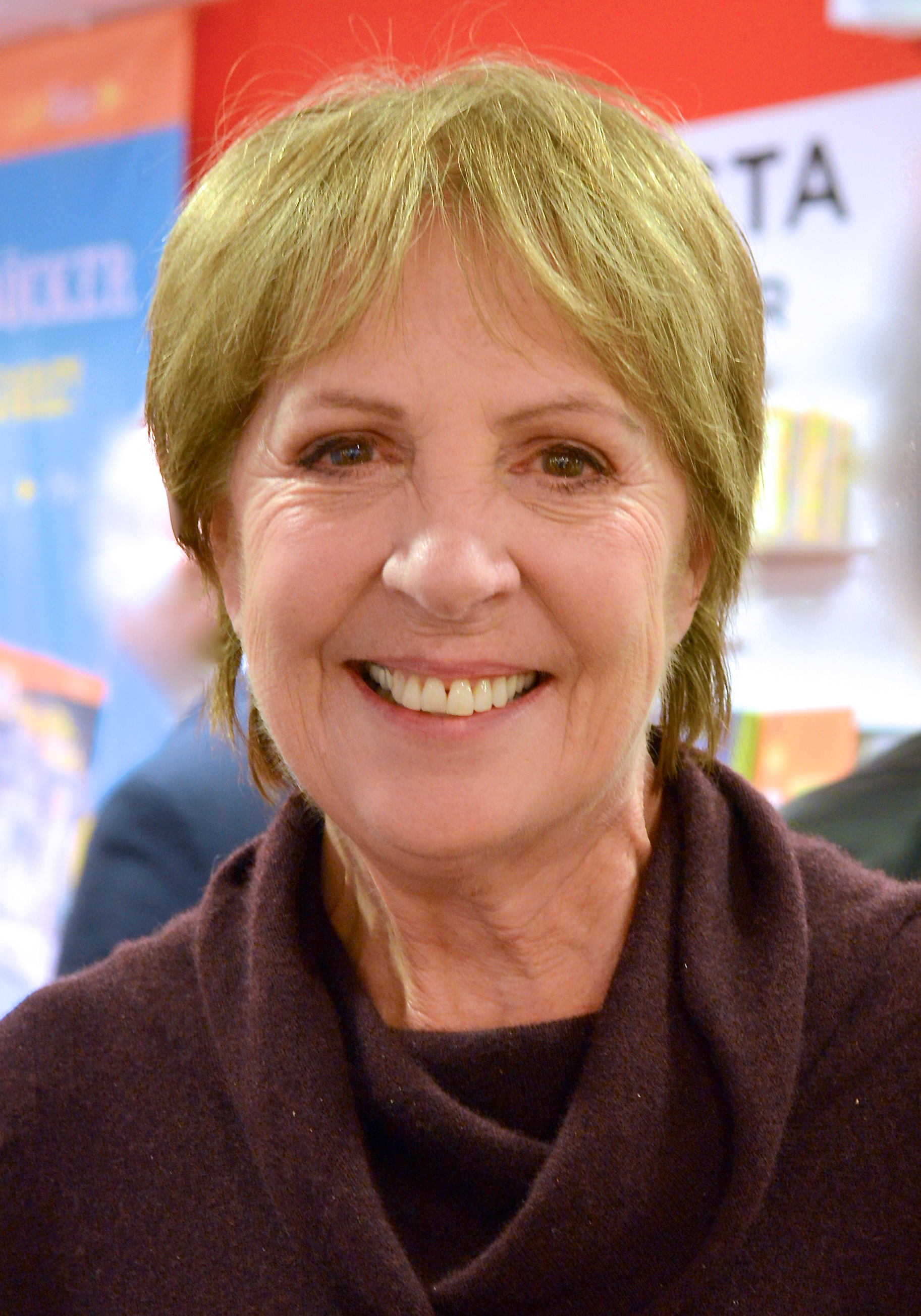
Penelope Wilton (2013)

After Christopher Eccleston's departure from the series' lead role, Davies was eager to include elements of the 2005 season in David Tennant's Christmas Day introductory episode to reassure viewers discomfited by the change of lead actor. To this end he and producer Phil Collinson secured the return of Wilton's character in her capacity as prime minister. In the dénouement of "The Christmas Invasion" the character's government is brought down by the new Doctor after she orders Torchwood to shoot down a fleeing alien ship. Davies remarks that as prime minister, Jones is "out of her depth" and "does the wrong thing"; he intended her downfall to reflect the episode's anti-war message. Producer Julie Gardner felt the end sequence "added so much of another layer" to the episode. Collinson mentioned on the DVD commentary for the episode that he "tried so hard" to get Davies to change the ending; he felt the Doctor would forgive her because "he would understand" her decision. Collinson also felt that Harriet's downfall could be seen as a "hark to Thatcher" as one of Thatcher's aides had reportedly stated her looking tired; Davies acknowledged a parallel with events in Whitehall and felt the script underlined the power of rumours. He also "[loved] the fact that I feel sad" because of the character's political demise. In his column in Doctor Who Magazine Davies explains his intention that by the Doctor ending Jones's career early, a "gap" was created in history that the Master (John Simm) was then able to exploit and become prime minister. He had originally planned to allude to this in the script, but it was cut when he realised that the Doctor was already burdened by enough guilt.

Davies wrote Harriet Jones into the script for the fourth series episode "The Stolen Earth" before Wilton was approached about reprising the role because Julie Gardner and Phil Collinson wished for the character to have a satisfying and redemptive conclusion. Harriet Jones's story arc thus formed a tripartite storyline which consisted of an introduction, animosity towards the Doctor, and redemption. Davies was aware that Wilton was "very hard to book" and restricted her appearance to one scene to make negotiations easier; had Wilton declined, Davies planned to replace her with either Donna Noble (Catherine Tate) from "The Runaway Bride", Mr Copper (Clive Swift) from "Voyage of the Damned", or Elton from "Love & Monsters". Wilton accepted unconditionally because she "would do anything for ... Davies" and she wished to act in Phil Collinson's last filming block as producer as her first appearance in "Aliens of London" was filmed in the first production block of the first series. Wilton's scenes in her final episode were filmed in a single day from a cottage in Dinas Powys. Recalling her final episode, Wilton described the filming experience as "fabulous fun", remarking that "I got to sacrifice myself to save the world." Collinson and Davies lamented the character's death: Collinson stated, "I can't bear the thought she's dead" and argued that she somehow survived, whilst Davies stated in Doctor Who Magazine issue 397 that "when [significant characters a writer creates] have to die, it's a genuinely emotional time".

== Reception ==
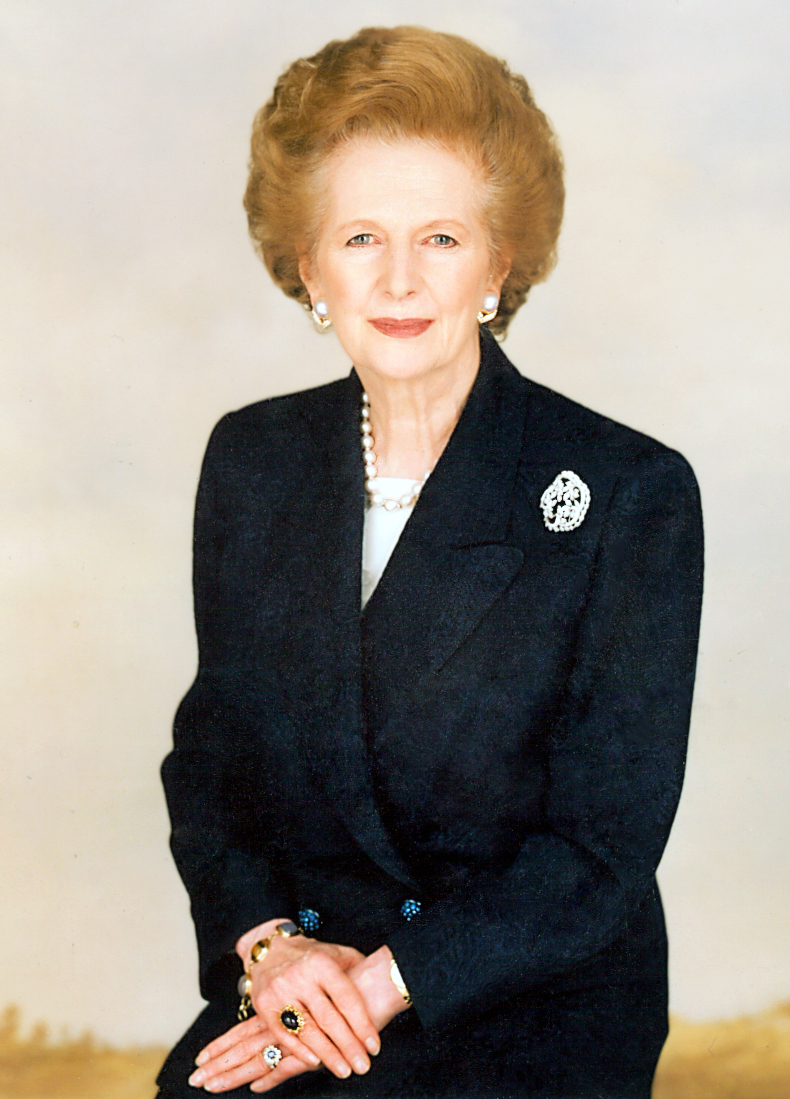
Margaret Thatcher (c. 1995/1996)

Radio Times reviewer Patrick Mulkern likened the character to Brigitte Nyborg (Sidse Babett Knudsen) in the Danish series Borgen, explaining that the two "form a very small club of politicians in TV drama who are hugely sympathetic, female and enjoy a rapid rise to PM". Mulkern felt that Wilton was "a major saving grace" in the "disappointing" "Aliens of London" / "World War Three". The Daily Telegraph's Hugh Davies commented on a number of political allusions made through Jones's characterisation as Prime Minister in "The Christmas Invasion". He felt that her rebuttal of aid from the US president after aliens invade is a "swipe at Blair and Bush over the invasion of Iraq". He also compared Jones's destruction of the fleeing Sycorax—a decision heavily criticised by the Doctor—to Margaret Thatcher's decision to sink the Argentine warship General Belgrano during the Falklands War. Russell T Davies responded to observations of political commentary by stating that there is "absolutely an anti-war message" present in the episode due to Christmas being "a day of peace". In their unauthorised guide to Doctor Who, Graeme Burk and Robert Smith felt that Wilton delivered the "standout performance" of the Christmas special" stating that, whilst the character remained recognisable, it was "fascinating watching her harder edge emerge from the woman we know and love". Of Harriet Jones's development, Stuart Galbrainth of DVD Talk felt that she begins as a "charming neophyte minister" but becomes "suddenly much less charming at the end of 'Christmas Invasion', when she becomes just another politician". However, Cliff Chapman of Den of Geek felt that the episode's denouement was flawed by trying to "make out that Harriet Jones is awful for doing something perfectly reasonable". Similarly, io9's Chris Cummins commented that the character had "noble intentions" and that she was proved right upon her return in the fourth series.

Charlie Jane Anders of io9 placed the "glowing nobility" of Jones's sacrifice in "The Stolen Earth" as the most prominent of the "super-heroics" displayed by the returning characters in the episode. Though tired of a running joke throughout the series where Jones would introduce herself only to be told "I know who you are", Anders remarks that in the face of her demise "she was able to turn her usual schtick into a moving speech of defiance." The Daily Telegraph's Chris Hastings felt that by the time she is killed off, Harriet was "one of the show's most popular characters". SFX placed the character of Harriet Jones at number 12 in a 2009 article listing the 27 things they loved best about the revival of Doctor Who, citing the running joke associated with the character. In 2015, Dan Wilson of Metro listed Harriet as one of the ten best original characters introduced to Doctor Who since 2005, describing her as a "complex woman" who "came good in the end".

== See also ==
- List of fictional prime ministers of the United Kingdom

== Bibliography ==
- Burk, Graeme; Smith?, Robert (6 March 2012). "Series 1". Who Is the Doctor: The Unofficial Guide to Doctor Who-The New Series (1st ed.). ECW Press. pp. 63–124. ISBN 978-1550229844.
