= Jack Tarlton =

Scottish actor

- Born: 24 July 1976 (age 50); Edinburgh, Scotland, United Kingdom
- Occupation: Actor

Jack Tarlton (born 24 July 1976) is a British actor from Edinburgh, Scotland, known for his theatre and television work.

== Life and career ==
Tarlton took part in a week-long theatre workshop in Edinburgh when he was nine and decided then that he wanted to be an actor. He joined youth theatre groups, and after finishing secondary school went to the London Academy of Music and Dramatic Art (LAMDA).

At the National Theatre he has appeared as Meshak Gardiner and other roles in Once in a Lifetime (2005) and the Porter and a Society Gent in From Morning to Midnight (2013). From 2005 to 2006, he appeared as Meshak in the original Royal National Theatre production of Helen Edmundson's Coram Boy.

In 2006-2007 he was a member of the Propeller company, appearing as Hortensio in The Taming of the Shrew and Orsino in Twelfth Night (Old Vic and international tour). He returned to the company in 2009 playing Bassanio in The Merchant of Venice and Lysander in A Midsummer Night's Dream (UK and international tour).

Other theatre work includes Jackie Jackson in The Deep Blue Sea (Bath, London and UK tour), Hastings in She Stoops to Conquer (Manchester Royal Exchange), Mercutio in Romeo and Juliet (Chichester Festival Theatre), Eric Birling in An Inspector Calls (Garrick Theatre), and Aleksey in A Month in the Country and Paris in Troilus and Cressida (Royal Shakespeare Company).

== Filmography ==
=== Film ===
Year	Film	Role	Notes
2014	The Imitation Game	Charles Richards	

=== Television ===
Year	Film	Role	Notes
1998	The Cater Street Hangman	Det. Sgt. Webster	
1999	Life Support	Alan Cousins	The Price of Love
2001	Swivel on the Tip	Various	
2001	Hearts and Bones	John	Episode #2.4
2004	Dead Ringers	Sam Hothead	Episode #3.2
2004	The Genius of Mozart	Mozart	Three-part dramatised documentary
2004	True Horror with Anthony Head	Stanley Worth	Witches
2005	Doctor Who	Reporter Tom Hitchingson	Episodes: Aliens of London, World War Three
2005	The Golden Hour	Paramedic Mitch Jones	Episode #1.4
2010	Doctors	Coming to Get You	
2019	8 Days: To the Moon and Back	Astronaut Buzz Aldrin	Commemorative documentary first shown on BBC2 on 10 July 2019
2019–2022	Traces	Fiscal John	Recurring role; 7 episodes
2020–2023	Outlander	Kenny Lindsay	Recurring role; 10 episodes
