= Boom Town (Doctor Who) =

165 – "Boom Town"
- Doctor Who episode
- The Doctor dines with Margaret Blaine. The scene of the Doctor dining with his enemy was centred around exploring a moral dilemma concerning the consequences of the Doctor's actions.

Cast
- Doctor: Christopher Eccleston – Ninth Doctor
- Companions: Billie Piper – Rose Tyler; John Barrowman – Jack Harkness; Noel Clarke – Mickey Smith
- Others: Annette Badland – Margaret Blaine; William Thomas – Mr Cleaver; Mali Harries – Cathy; Aled Pedrick – Idris Hopper; Alan Ruscoe – Slitheen

Production
- Directed by: Joe Ahearne
- Written by: Russell T Davies
- Produced by: Phil Collinson
- Executive producers: Russell T Davies; Julie Gardner; Mal Young
- Music by: Murray Gold
- Production code: 1.11
- Series: Series 1
- Running time: 45 mins
- First broadcast: 4 June 2005

Chronology
| ← Preceded by "The Doctor Dances" | Followed by → "Bad Wolf" |

"Boom Town" is the eleventh episode of the first series of the British science fiction television programme Doctor Who. The episode was first broadcast on BBC One on 4 June 2005. It was written by executive producer Russell T Davies and directed by Joe Ahearne.

The episode is set in Cardiff in the early 21st century, six months after the 2005 episode "World War Three". In the episode, the criminal alien Slitheen named "Margaret Blaine" (Annette Badland) attempts to gain her freedom after being captured and detained by the alien time traveller the Ninth Doctor (Christopher Eccleston).

"Boom Town" was a replacement episode for a story that was to be written by Paul Abbott, but had to be abandoned because of other commitments. Davies decided to write a different story centred on bringing Badland's character back from the fourth and fifth episodes of the series, "Aliens of London" and "World War Three", as he had enjoyed her performances. Primarily, Davies wanted to explore the consequences of the Doctor's actions and question whether he had the right to sentence an enemy to death. The episode was also intended to showcase Cardiff, where the revived Doctor Who series is made, and where the episode was filmed in February 2005. "Boom Town" was watched by 7.68 million viewers in the United Kingdom and received mixed reviews from critics.

== Plot ==
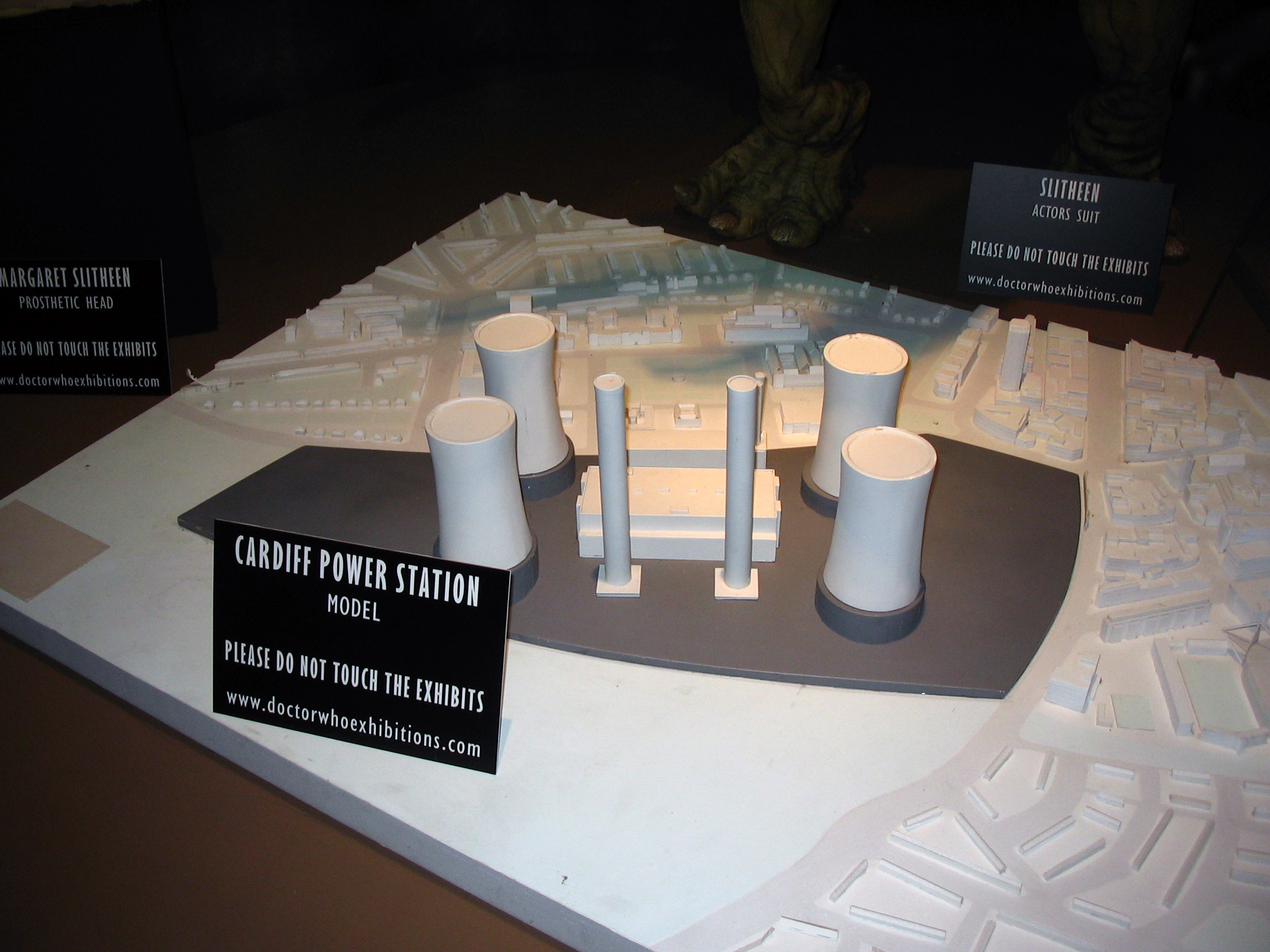
The plans for the new nuclear power plant, on display at a Doctor Who exhibition.

The Ninth Doctor lands the TARDIS in Cardiff, using the energy of the Cardiff Rift to recharge the engines of the time machine. Mickey joins the Doctor, Rose, and Jack for lunch. The Doctor spots a newspaper article showing Margaret Blaine, a Slitheen, has become Cardiff's new mayor. The four track down and capture Blaine to find out what she is doing there. The Doctor observes Blaine's scale model plans for a new nuclear power plant, but realizes that it is purposely flawed to cause a meltdown that would open the Cardiff Rift and destroy the Earth. He also discovers the model contains an "extrapolator" that Blaine would have used to flee the Earth. The Doctor decides to take Blaine back to her home planet of Raxacoricofallapatorius, but she reveals that she has received a death sentence there and will be executed upon returning. The Doctor agrees to her final request to accompany her to dinner in a restaurant. Blaine makes several half-hearted attempts to kill the Doctor but he easily avoids them. She then asks him to take her to another planet instead.

Jack begins integrating the extrapolator into the TARDIS to speed up the engine recharge. Rose and Mickey hang out together, and he claims to her that he is dating someone else because she is not there for him. Before Rose can answer whether she will come back to Mickey, Cardiff is struck by a large earthquake that is coming from the Rift. The Doctor, Blaine, Rose, and Jack regroup and find that the extrapolator was a trap meant to redirect the energy from the TARDIS into the Rift, rupturing it. Jack and the Doctor are unable to stop the energy transfer, and Blaine takes Rose hostage and demands the extrapolator. The heart of the TARDIS opens on the console, bathing Blaine in light. While she is captivated by the light, Jack and the Doctor close the rift and disable the extrapolator. As the console closes, they find that Blaine's human suit is empty except for an egg. The Doctor surmises that the TARDIS sensed that Blaine wanted a second chance at life and gave it to her. The TARDIS crew decides to return the egg to Raxacoricofallapatorius so Blaine can be raised in a different family. Rose realises Mickey has left without saying goodbye. She runs out to look for him, but finds he has gone.

=== Continuity ===
The Rift was established earlier in the series in "The Unquiet Dead". Margaret says that as a child she was threatened with being fed to venom grubs; these creatures appeared in the First Doctor serial The Web Planet (1965).

== Production ==
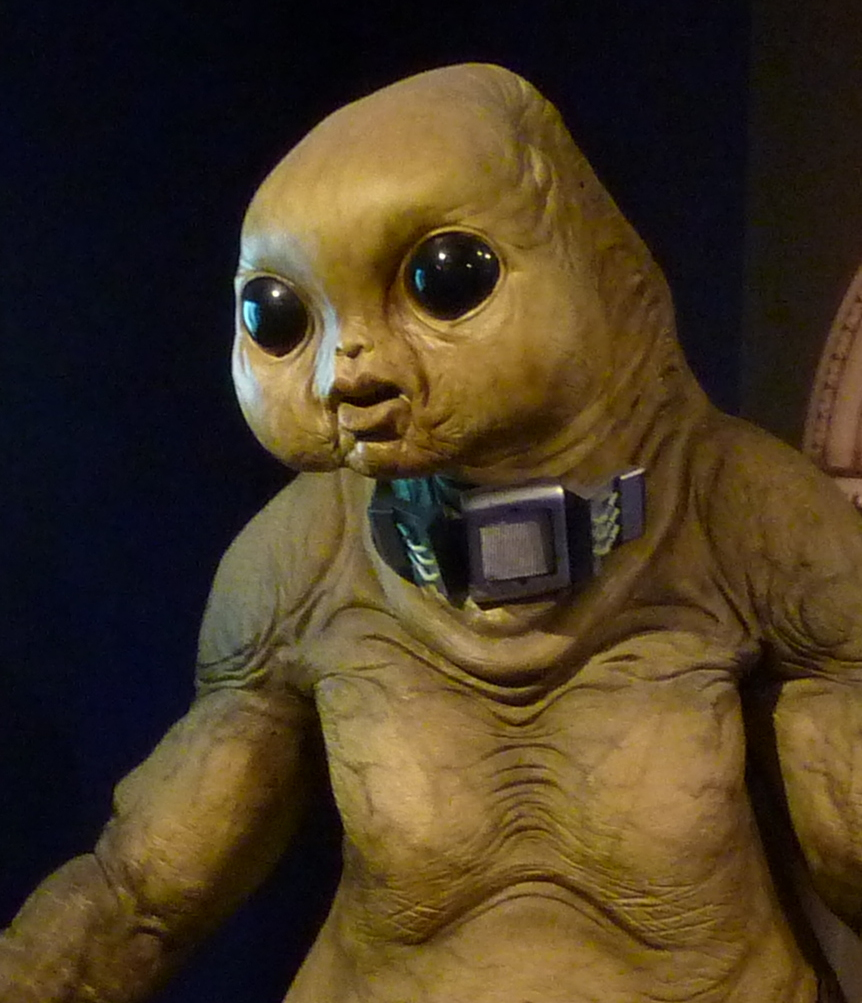
Slitheen model shown at the Doctor Who Experience

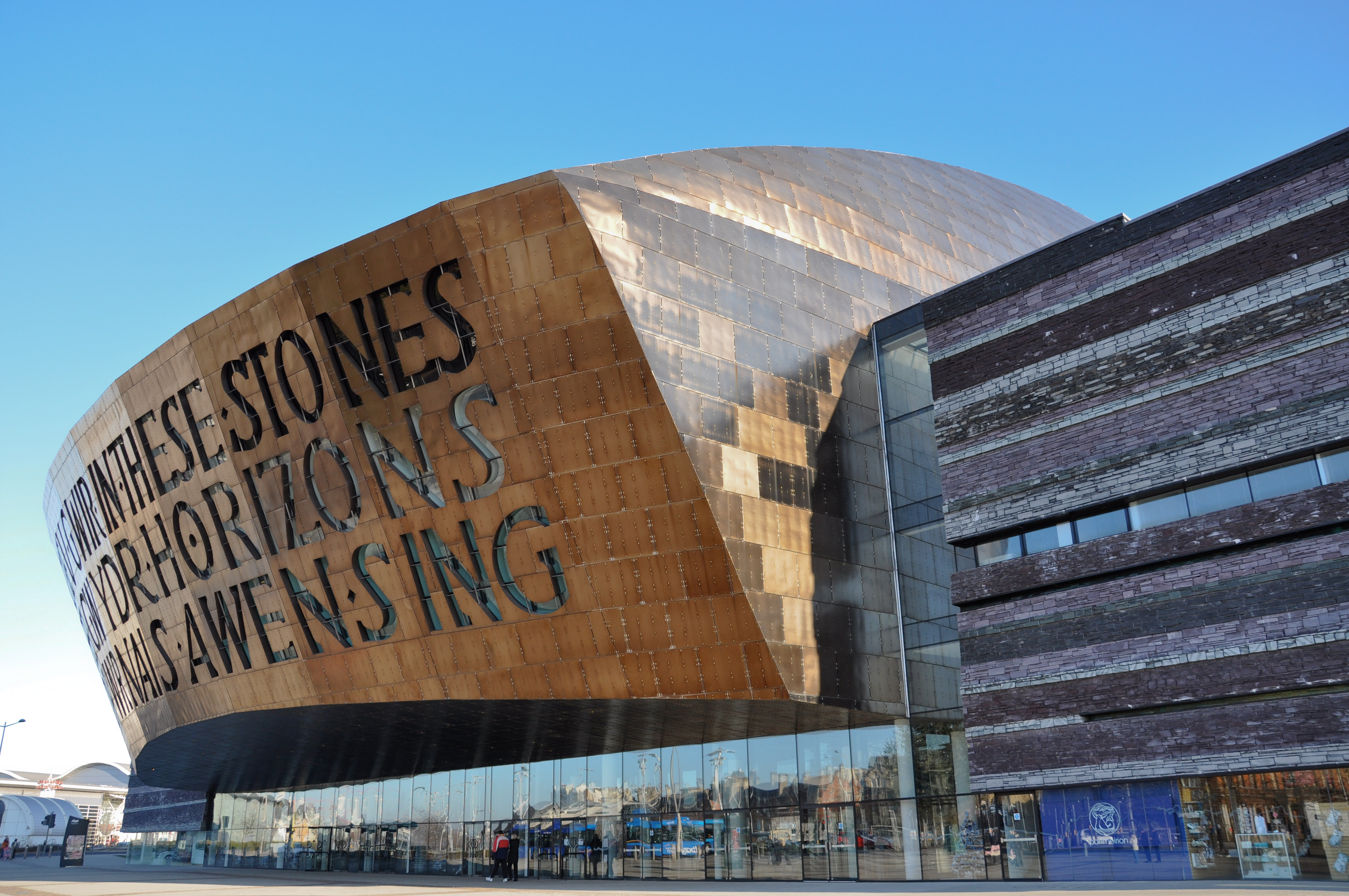
The episode featured the Millennium Centre and Cardiff Bay prominently.

According to an interview with executive producer and episode writer Russell T Davies in Doctor Who Magazine, this episode was originally offered to his friend and former colleague, the scriptwriter Paul Abbott. Abbott accepted and submitted a storyline, revealing that Rose had been bred by the Doctor as an experiment in creating a perfect companion. The episode was titled "The Void". However, Abbot had to abandon the project due to other commitments. Davies wrote "Boom Town" instead, bringing back Badland as Blaine due to her performance in "Aliens of London" and "World War Three" being "brilliant", though she had few lines. The actor playing Mr Cleaver, William Thomas, had previously appeared as Martin the undertaker in the 1988 classic series story Remembrance of the Daleks. This made him the first performer to appear in both the original and current run of Doctor Who. He later played Geraint Cooper, the father of Gwen Cooper, in the Doctor Who spinoff series Torchwood.

Davies stated that he originally intended to call this episode "Dining with Monsters". He joked that a much better name for this episode would be "What should we do with Margaret?" Davies intended the episode to be a character piece exploring whether the Doctor had the authority to take someone to their death sentence, as well as showing the consequences of the Doctor's actions the last time he met Margaret. The storyline was fitting for Eccleston's war-torn Doctor. The consequences of the Doctor's lifestyle are also explored through Rose's boyfriend Mickey, who has been forced to move on because she is not around. The resolution is a deliberate deus ex machina, regressing Margaret so she can start anew, although Davies remarked that the resolution did not come completely out of nowhere as the TARDIS' psychic link had been already established.

Much of "Boom Town" was filmed on Cardiff Bay, with one scene in particular in front of the Millennium Centre, in February 2005. The Doctor is seen reading the Welsh newspaper Western Mail; Davies stated that he wanted to incorporate Welsh culture because the series is made in Wales and contains a lot of Welsh crew members. He also wanted to show off how beautiful the area could be. The night shoot of Rose and Mickey in front of the water tower at Roald Dahl Plass had to be extended to two nights because it was below the temperature at which the fountain automatically shuts off. The dinner scene between the Doctor and Margaret was filmed in January 2005 at the Cardiff restaurant Bistro 10 before the rest of the episode was filmed; Eccleston filmed the scene while Piper and Barrowman were filming scenes for "The Empty Child". This was due to scheduling conflicts with Badland. Some of the schedule was also rearranged because of the death of Piper's uncle, resulting in her and Eccleston being replaced by doubles during some scenes near the end of the episode. The egg Margaret turns into was a reused prop from the second episode, "The End of the World".

== Broadcast and reception ==
"Boom Town" was first broadcast in the United Kingdom on 4 June 2005 on BBC One. The episode received overnight ratings of 7.13 million viewers, a 36.95% audience share and an increase over the past two weeks. When final ratings were calculated, the figure rose to 7.68 million. The episode received an Audience Appreciation Index score of 82.

SFX described "Boom Town" as a "format-breaking episode". The reviewer acknowledged that it "certainly misfires on some levels, and leaves various elements underdeveloped", but praised the moral dilemma, including the dinner scene. However, the conclusion with Margaret being reverted to an egg was seen as a "little too handy and provides the Doctor with a moral get-out clause", and the Rose and Mickey subplot was called "weak" due to the lack of evidence he and Rose were ever close. Arnold T Blumburg of Now Playing gave the episode a grade of B+, writing that it "sacrifices a bit of plot and logic" for a good exploration of the characters and plot threads. He praised the dialogue and Murray Gold's score. Digital Spy's Dek Hogan was more negative, feeling that it "really didn't work", calling bringing back Margaret a "poor idea", and he criticised the pace for dragging too much.

In 2013, Patrick Mulkern of Radio Times particularly praised Badland and the dinner scene, though he described the whole episode as a "peculiar short-story, a low-cal filler sandwiched between the dramatic juggernauts of Steven Moffat's Doctor Who debut and Russell T Davies's dazzling finale." The A.V. Club reviewer Alasdair Wilkins gave the episode a grade of B, noting that it required more suspension of disbelief than usual. He felt that the plot was included out of necessity while the episode was more focused on character moments, and that this did not work as well as "Father's Day" because Margaret's fate was "less clearly motivated." On the other hand, Wilkins called Rose and Mickey's subplot the most effectively handled part of "Boom Town". In Who Is the Doctor, a guide to the revived series, author Stacey Smith? [sic] called the episode "highly entertaining" and "thoughtful", despite not being well-plotted with an "unsatisfying" deus ex machina ending. She praised the character material and comedy. Her coauthor Graeme Burk was less enthusiastic, describing it as "nothing more" than a "fun romp". He felt that there were many good scenes but "no real story", and pointed out how the moral dilemma did not matter because the decision does not end up being in the Doctor's hands.
