= Keith Boak =

British film and television director

- Born: Edinburgh, Scotland
- Education: University of Bristol
- Occupation: Director
- Years active: 1993 – present

Keith Boak is a British film and television director, best known for his work on several popular continuing drama series. He currently resides and works in the United States.

== Early life ==
Born in Edinburgh, he attended the John Hampden High School, High Wycombe and graduated in law at the University of Bristol in 1984.

His career began in the theatre, directing 'In Nomine Patris' by Paula Maggee which won a Scotsman Fringe First Award at the 1985 Edinburgh Festival and transferred to the Kings Head Theatre, London. He subsequently trained as an assistant director at Riverside Studios under David Gothard running a writer's group with Hanif Kureishi and directing new work by Stephen Lowe, Tunde Ikoli and Dario Fo, assisting on productions with Paines Plough, Foco Novo, the Royal National Theatre and the Theatre of Comedy Company.

Appointed Assistant Director at the Royal Court in 1986 under Max Stafford Clark, he assisted Sir Richard Eyre on Alan Bennett's 'Kafka's Dick', Jonathan Miller on Ryszard Kapuściński's 'The Emperor' and Danny Boyle on Howard Barker's 'Bite of the Night'.

He directed Berkoff's 'East' and the first stage production of Anthony Burgess' 'Clockwork Orange' at Edinburgh Festival, 'Requiem' with the dancer Gaby Agis at Leicester Haymarket, 'Milkwood Blues' with Allan Corduner at the Lyric Theatre, Hammersmith, Jean-Claude van Itallie's 'The Traveller' with David Threlfall at the Almeida Theatre and Heidi Thomas' 'Indigo' with Dougray Scott also at the Almeida. Other theatre credits include 'Crimes of Passion' at Leicester Haymarket, 'Water Music' at the Soho Theatre and 'Jitterbugger' at the Royal National Theatre Studio.

== Career ==
Boak was the first director on the widely acclaimed BBC revival of the classic science fiction series Doctor Who (BAFTA Award for Best TV Drama Series in 2005), directing the episodes "Rose", "Aliens of London" and "World War Three". For C4, he directed in New York City and London for the transatlantic series NY-LON and his first film Impact Earth was broadcast on Discovery Channel/C4 in 2008.

His extensive TV directing credits include Village by the Sea (from Anita Desai's novel in Sri Lanka), Case Histories, Silent Witness, Hotel Babylon, Strictly Confidential, Death in Paradise, New Tricks, Thieftakers, City Central, London's Burning, Waterloo Road, The Knock, True or False, Pie in the Sky, Sunburn, Out of the Blue, Staying Alive, Wokenwell, Merseybeat, The Bill, Holby City, Casualty, Eastenders, and the single drama Substance.

He directed the documentary Running the Bulls and six short films for C4, including These Colours Don't Run (with John Hannah), Fist of the Dragonfly (with Simon Russell Beale and Burt Kwouk), After the Party (with Jemma Redgrave and Morag Hood), Nightclub, The Return of Neville Dead, and The Loser (with Phil Daniels and Sean Bean).

In 2012, Boak directed the cybercrime film Companies Like Yours for The Edge Picture Company. That year, it won the IVCA Award for Best Director and two Best Film Gold Awards at the New York International Film and Television Festival.

In the United States, Boak has directed multiple episodes of Turn: Washington's Spies for the AMC Network, Rectify for the Sundance Channel, and Outsiders for WGN America.

== Filmography ==
=== Television ===
Year	Title	Role(s)	Notes
1993-94	EastEnders	Director	15 episodes
1994-95	The Bill	Director	6 episodes
1995	Thieftakers	Director	
1996	Out of the Blue	Director	2 episodes
1996	Pie in the Sky	Director	2 episodes
1997	Wokenwell	Director	2 episodes
1998	City Central	Director	2 episodes
1999	Harbour Lights	Director	4 episodes
2000	The Knock	Director	
2000	Sunburn	Director	
2001/03	Mersey Beat	Director	3 episodes
2001-04	Holby City	Director	12 episodes
2003	The Royal	Director	3 episodes
2004	NY-LON	Director	Episode: "Something About Chemicals"
2005	Doctor Who	Director	3 episodes
2006	Hotel Babylon	Director	2 episodes
2006	Strictly Confidential	Director	
2008	Casualty	Director	2 episodes
2009	Waterloo Road	Director	2 episodes
2011-16	Silent Witness	Director	6 episodes
2013	Death in Paradise	Director	2 episodes
2013	Case Histories	Director	Episode: "Jackson and the Women"
2014	New Tricks	Director	2 episodes
2015-17	Turn: Washington's Spies	Director	4 episodes
2018	Krypton	Director	1 episode
2019	For the People	Director	1 episode

=== Film ===
Year	Title	Role(s)	Notes
1990	The Loser	Director, producer	Short Film
2007	Futureshock: Comet	Director	TV movie
2014	Amendment	Director	Short Film
