= Lachele Carl =

American actress

- Born: Pittsburgh, Pennsylvania, U.S.
- Education: Point Park College
- Occupation: Actress
- Years active: 1982–present
- Spouse: Alejandro Viñao
- Children: 1

Lachele J. Carl is an American actress based in London. She has played Trinity Wells in Doctor Who, and its spin-offs The Sarah Jane Adventures, Torchwood and The War Between the Land and the Sea.

== Early life ==
Carl was born in Pittsburgh. She enjoyed performing from a young age, but became especially interested in her senior year of high school. She graduated from Point Park College in 1982. During her studies, Carl trained in classical theatre at the Pittsburgh Playhouse. She moved to the United Kingdom in 1985, wanting to do Shakespeare, and joined a theatre company called TNT.

== Career ==
Carl played news anchor Trinity Wells, a recurring character in the first four series of the 2005 revival of Doctor Who, appearing in the episodes "Aliens of London"/"World War Three", "The Christmas Invasion", "The Sound of Drums", "The Poison Sky", "Turn Left", "The Stolen Earth" and "The End of Time". Wells also appeared in the Doctor Who spin-offs The Sarah Jane Adventures (in the stories Revenge of the Slitheen and Secrets of the Stars) and Torchwood, during its five-part serial Children of Earth, making her the first character to appear in all three programmes. To this date, Carl is one of just four actors to have appeared in all three shows, the others being Anthony Daebeck (who plays a French newsreader), and Paul Marc Davis. In 2023, Carl reprised her role in "The Giggle", as part of Doctor Who's 2023 specials and returned once more in the 2025 Ncuti Gatwa-era episode Lucky Day. She reprised the character in the mini-series The War Between the Land and the Sea.

Carl also narrated the behind-the-scenes special Doctor Who: The Companions for BBC America, released as part of the seventh series DVD box set.

Carl has also appeared in Grange Hill, Batman and Alien Autopsy. She plays one of the voices in The Notekins and was the first voice of Muck and Molly in the American English dub of the children's TV series Bob the Builder. Carl played a minor role as the US ambassador in the British TV show Ambassadors.

== Personal life ==
Carl lives in Crouch End, North London with her husband, composer Alejandro Viñao. They have a son.

== Filmography ==
=== Film ===
Year	Film	Role	Notes
1982	Midnight	Sandra Carrington	
1987	The Continental	Monica	Television film
1988	Maigret	Sergeant Leila Normand	Television film
1989	Batman	TV Technician	
1991	A Kiss Before Dying	Reporter	
1991	Firestar: First Contact	Lucindia Jericho	
1998	A Guru in Seven	Anthea	
2001	Wit	Fellow 4	Television film
2001	Superstition	News Reporter	
2001	Strange Relations	Sharna	Television film
2006	Renaissance	Nora	English dub, voice only
2006	Alien Autopsy	TV News Anchor	
2006	Assault on Waco	Sheila Martin	Television film
2016	Denial	Gloria	
2018	Show Dogs	FBI Director	
2024	Tell No Lies	Julia Rose	

=== Television ===
Year	Film	Role	Notes
1987	Star Cops	Susan Caxton	Episode: "Little Green Men and Other Martians"
1991	Grange Hill	Cecile	Recurring role; 3 episodes
2001–2009	Bob the Builder	Muck, Molly, Ella Stevenson, The Librarian	Series regular, US version, Voice only
2002	Murder in Mind	Dr. Ringfield	Episode: "Victim"
2005–2010; 2023–2025	Doctor Who	Trinity Wells	Recurring role; 11 episodes
2007	M.I. High	Professor Green	Episode: "Super Blane"
2007–2008	The Sarah Jane Adventures	Trinity Wells	Recurring role; 2 episodes
2009	Torchwood	Trinity Wells	Recurring role; 2 episodes
2009	The Philanthropist	Louise Farabee	Episode: "San Diego"
2011	Tati's Hotel		Episode: "Nurse"
2012	Dark Matters: Twisted But True	Maisy	Episode: "Resurrection Row, Operation Brainwash, Rabid Roulette"
2013	Ambassadors	Petra	Miniseries; 3 episodes
2014	Holby City	Kim Keeble	Episode: "Cold Heart, Warm Hands"
2014	The Honourable Woman	US Secretary of State	Miniseries; 1 episode
2016	Undercover	Justice Galbraith	Miniseries; 1 episode
2017	Modus	Lori Reed	Recurring role; 5 episodes
2018	Deep State	Pundit Woman	Episode: "Stories"
2018	Holby City	Darsha Kotal	Episode: "One Man and His God"
2018–2019	Into the Badlands	Vitania	Recurring role; 5 episodes
2020	Flesh and Blood	Doctor	Miniseries; 1 episode
2022	Avenue 5	Margaret	Episode: "What An Unseasonal Delight"
2022	Wednesday	Agnes	Episode: "Quid Pro Woe"
2024	The Veil	Chief of Staff	Episode: "Grandfather's House"
2025	The War Between the Land and the Sea	Trinity Wells	Recurring role; 3 episodes

=== Video games ===
Year	Title	Role	Note(s)
2003	Bob the Builder: Bob's Castle Adventure	Muck	
2011	Driver: San Francisco	Additional Voices	
2014	Tropico 5	Adrianna Diaz	
2014	Alien: Isolation	Lingard	
2017	Horizon Zero Dawn	Additional Voices	
2020	Dreams	Naomi the Trumpeter	
2020	Chicken Police: Paint It Red!	Ursula / Foxy Lady	
2021	Encased	Clara Morgan	
2023	Sherlock Holmes: The Awakened		
2023	RoboCop: Rogue City		
