= Propeller (theatre company) =

Propeller is a theatre company which presents the plays of William Shakespeare in the UK and around the world. The director is Edward Hall.

== Background ==
In the mid 1990s, the artistic director of the Watermill Theatre, Jill Fraser, offered Edward Hall the opportunity to direct Othello – his first full Shakespeare play. Jill Fraser and Edward Hall's collaboration grew from this into Propeller Shakespeare "mixing a rigorous approach to the text with a modern physical aesthetic".

Hall has set out the rules of his company, “Everyone is paid the same wage and if an actor has created a part in a production then they will automatically receive an offer on the next one which they can refuse or take.” The company has seen new members since its start, keeping the group fresh.

Propeller has won several theatre awards, including winner of the 1999 Barclays Theatre Award for Best Director (Edward Hall in Twelfth Night), winner of the 2002 Barclays Theatre Awards Best Touring Production for Rose Rage, winner of the 2003 TMA Theatres Best Touring Production (A Midsummer Night's Dream), winner of 2004 Jeff Award for Best Director, subsequent American production (Edward Hall in Rose Rage), winner of 2007 OBIE Award for The Taming of the Shrew.

Their 2011 touring productions of Henry V and The Winter's Tale featured in a Guardian theatre series, On tour with Propeller.

== Repertory ==
- Henry V (first produced in 1997)
- The Comedy of Errors (1998)
- Twelfth Night (1999)
- Rose Rage (2001) based on the Henry VI plays
- A Midsummer Night's Dream (2003)
- The Winter's Tale (2005)
- The Taming of the Shrew (2006)
- The Merchant of Venice (2008)
- Richard III (2010)

The company has toured throughout the UK, and to Australia, Bangladesh, Barbados, China, Cyprus, Germany, Hong Kong, Indonesia, Ireland, Italy, Japan, Malaysia, Malta, Mexico, New Zealand, The Philippines, Poland, Spain, Sri Lanka, Turkey and the USA. They have appeared at the Shakespeare festival in Neuss, Germany.

== Company ==
Actors who have appeared with Propeller include:

- Nicholas Asbury (Montjoy, Sir Thomas Grey, Polixenes)
- Bob Barrett (Baptista, Malvolio, Antonio, Bottom)
- Richard Clothier (Richard III)
- Richard Dempsey (Lorenzo, Titania)
- John Dougall (Gobbo, Flute)
- Johnny Flynn (Sebastian, Curtis)
- Jamie Glover (Henry V)
- Robert Hands (Helena)
- Christopher Heyward (Orsino, Tailor, Widow)
- Robert Horwell (Pistol, Dromio, Sir Toby Belch)
- Dugald Bruce Lockhart (Petruchio, Olivia, Lysander)
- Sam Swainsbury (Salerio, Demetrius)
- Jack Tarlton (Bassanio, Lysander, Hortensio, Orsino)
- Dominic Tighe (Queen Elizabeth)
- Jon Trenchard (Jessica, Robin Goodfellow, Bianca)
- Tam Williams (Lucentio, Viola)
