= World War Three (Doctor Who) =

160b – "World War Three"
- Doctor Who episode

Cast
- Doctor: Christopher Eccleston – Ninth Doctor
- Companion: Billie Piper – Rose Tyler
- Others: Camille Coduri – Jackie Tyler; Noel Clarke – Mickey Smith; Penelope Wilton – Harriet Jones; Annette Badland – Margaret Blaine; Rupert Vansittart – General Asquith; Morgan Hopkins – Sergeant Price; Andrew Marr – Himself; David Verrey – Joseph Green; Steve Speirs – Strickland; Jack Tarlton – Tom Hitchingson; Lachele Carl – Trinity Wells; Corey Doabe – Spray Painter; Elizabeth Fost, Paul Kasey, Alan Ruscoe – Slitheen

Production
- Directed by: Keith Boak
- Written by: Russell T Davies
- Produced by: Phil Collinson
- Executive producers: Russell T Davies; Julie Gardner; Mal Young
- Music by: Murray Gold
- Production code: 1.5
- Series: Series 1
- Running time: 42 minutes
- First broadcast: 23 April 2005

Chronology
← Preceded by "Aliens of London"	Followed by → "Dalek"

"World War Three" is the fifth episode of the first series of the British science fiction television programme Doctor Who. It was written by showrunner Russell T Davies and directed by Keith Boak, and is the second of a two-part story which began with "Aliens of London". They were the first two-part story of the 2005 Doctor Who revival, leading to showrunner and episode writer Davies designing it to be large in scope. Production on the story began in 2004, eventually wrapping in January 2005.

In the episode, the alien time traveller known as the Doctor (Christopher Eccleston) and his companion, Rose Tyler (Billie Piper), team up with Rose's boyfriend Mickey Smith (Noel Clarke), her mother Jackie (Camille Coduri), and Member of Parliament Harriet Jones (Penelope Wilton) to foil the plan of the alien Slitheen family from destroying the Earth and then selling its remains.

It was first broadcast on BBC One on 23 April 2005 to a live audience of 7.98 million. The episode received mixed responses from critics. Though many praised the performances of the cast and the writing of its characters, the Slitheen were heavily criticised for not being taken seriously within the narrative.

== Plot ==
Mickey Smith (Noel Clarke), ex-boyfriend of Rose Tyler (Billie Piper) is able to push aside the impostor police inspector advancing on Rose's mother Jackie Tyler (Camille Coduri) in her flat. Escaping an electrical pulse set by the Slitheen to kill him in 10 Downing Street, alien time-traveler the Ninth Doctor (Christopher Eccleston) attempts to get the help of the police. However, by the time he has returned, the Slitheen have returned to their human disguises and accuse the Doctor of killing those affected by the pulse. The Doctor escapes to the upper floors of Downing Street and reunites with Rose, who is his travelling companion, and MP Harriet Jones (Penelope Wilton) in the Cabinet Rooms. Just before sealing off the rooms, the Doctor confronts the Slitheen and learns that they are a crime family intent on selling the Earth for commercial purposes.

Making contact with Mickey, the Doctor gives him instructions on how to log into the military organisation UNIT's website on his computer. The Doctor uses the information from the site to determine that a Slitheen ship is presently in the North Sea transmitting a signal. After the Doctor figures out the Slitheen are weak to acetic acid, Jackie and Mickey use food items covered in vinegar from Mickey's flat to kill the Slitheen threatening to kill them.

The Slitheen declare a national emergency and request that the United Nations release the activation codes to launch a nuclear strike against a fictitious mothership. The Doctor realises that the Slitheen actually plan to fire the weapons against other countries in order to start World War III, which would reduce the Earth to molten rock. The Slitheen plan to sell the Earth's radioactive remains as a fuel source, which they have already begun advertising through the signal. Through Harriet's insistence, the Doctor helps Mickey to hack into the controls of a Royal Navy submarine and fire a missile at 10 Downing Street, even though the Doctor is unsure of whether they will survive. The explosion kills the Slitheen, though the trio are able to survive. Harriet subsequently begins to campaign to be the next Prime Minister, and the Doctor offers Mickey the chance to travel with him, though Mickey declines. The Doctor and Rose subsequently depart in the TARDIS.

== Production ==
=== Development and writing ===
"World War Three", like its preceding installment, "Aliens of London", was part of the first two-part story of Doctor Who's 2005 revival. As a result, showrunner and episode writer Russell T Davies felt the story had to be "big". Thus, it was decided to focus the plot on 10 Downing Street, alongside the introduction of the alien crime family the Slitheen. Davies asserted that "Doctor Who is all about big green monsters", resulting in him giving the Slitheen such characteristics, as well as incorporating fart humor into their characters.

The story was written in spring 2004, with "World War Three" initially being named "10 Downing Street". The first draft of the story was delivered on 17 May 2004. Initially, there was uncertainty about how the two episodes would be referred to on-screen, and whether they would use separate titles or carry "Part One" and "Part Two" monikers. A later working name for the episode would be "World War 3", which would later be altered to "World War Three". Both it and "Aliens of London" would end up receiving separate name, with "World War Three" being the final title decided upon. Joseph Green's comments about nuclear weapons were similar to those of Prime Minister Tony Blair's about Iraq and weapons of mass destruction.

=== Filming ===
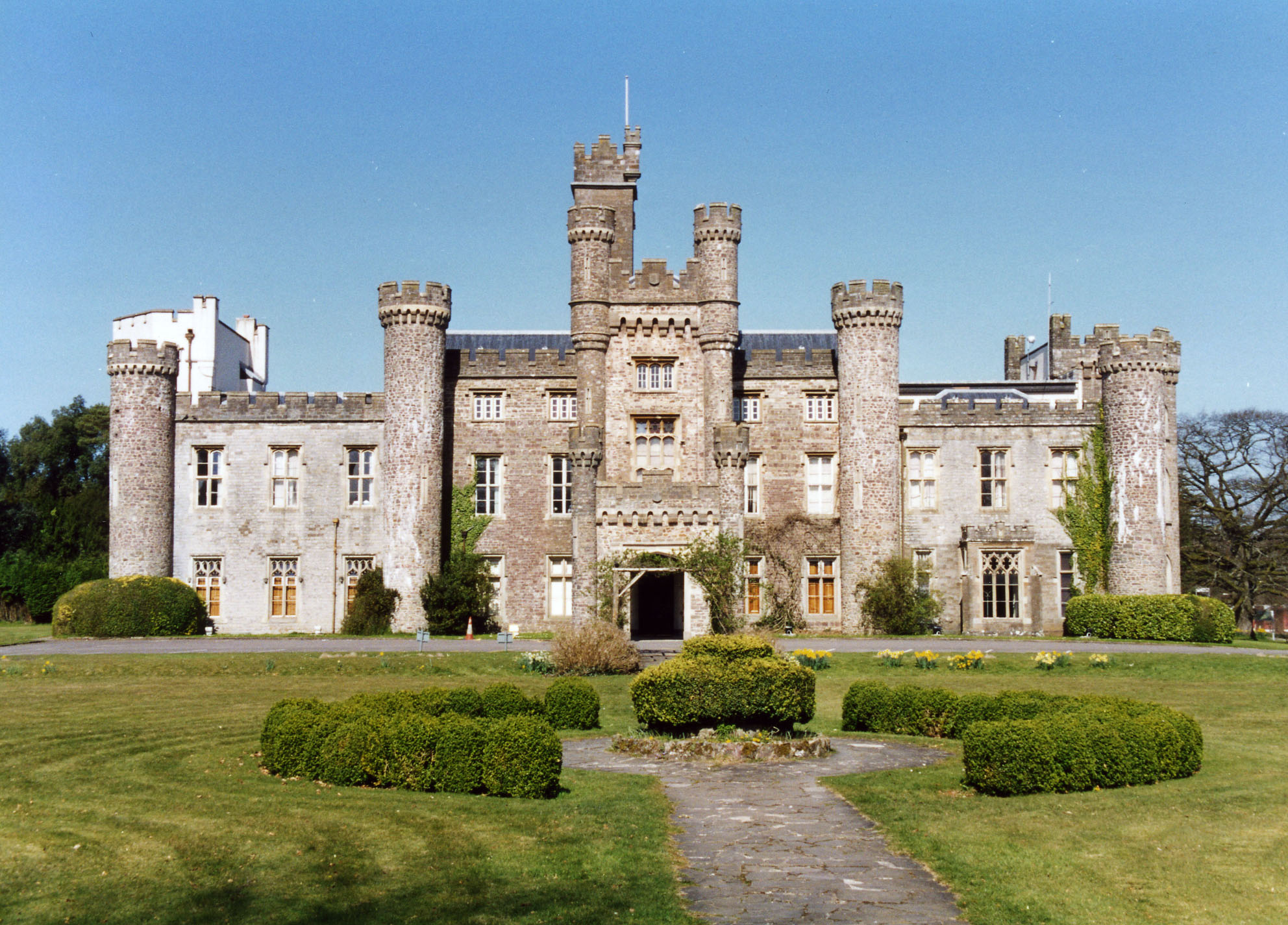
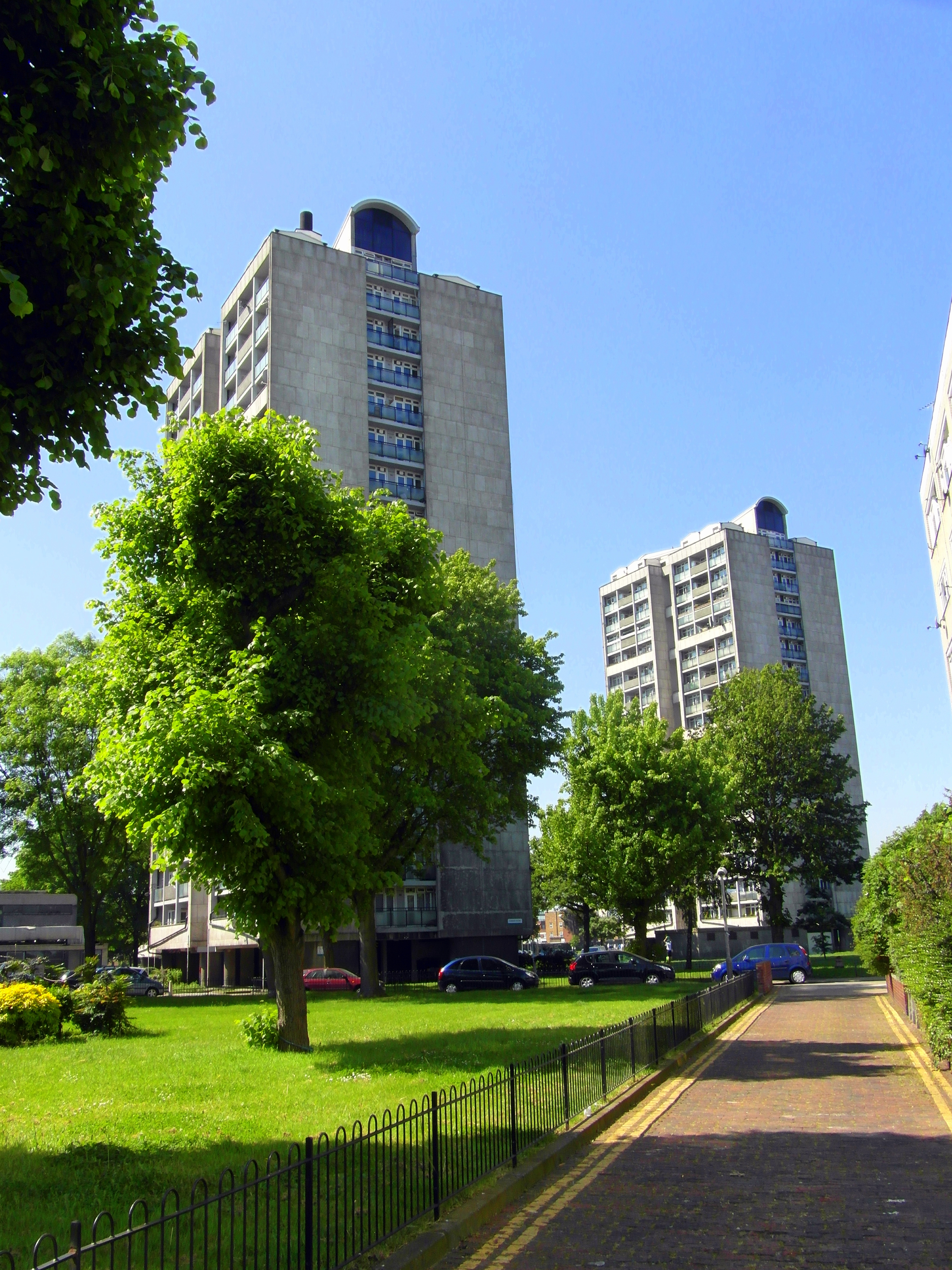
Hensol Castle (left) and the Brandon Estate (right) were filming locations used for the episode

"Aliens of London" and "World War Three" were directed by Keith Boak. "World War Three" was assigned the production code number "1.5". The episodes, along with "Rose", were part of the first production block of Doctor Who series 1. The read-through for "World War Three" was held on 12 July 2004. The bulk of filming would primarily occur from July-September 2004, with further shoots and model work occurring throughout October and November of the same year. Further post-production wrapped by late January 2005.

Filming locations for "World War Three" included John Adam Street in London, which served as a double for exterior shots of 10 Downing Street. Hensol Castle in Wales would act as the interiors for 10 Downing Street, while the Lower Dock Street in Newport, Wales was used as the filming location for Downing Street after it was blown up and reduced to rubble. The Brandon Estate in Kennington doubled as the location of the Powell Estate, where Rose, Jackie, and Mickey lived.

=== Casting ===
Christopher Eccleston and Billie Piper return in their main cast roles of the Ninth Doctor and Rose Tyler, respectively. Camille Coduri and Noel Clarke reprise their roles as Jackie Tyler and Mickey Smith, who they had previously portrayed in "Rose". Penelope Wilton plays the character Harriet Jones, who would go on to be a recurring character in the series. David Verrey portrays Green, one of the Slitheen, with Annette Badland playing the role of another Slitheen. During filming, Davies became impressed with Annette Badland's performance; as a result, he would bring her back to reprise her role in the episode "Boom Town" (2005).

Lachele Carl makes her second appearance as American reporter Trinity Wells. She was first seen in "Aliens of London", and has since reprised her role in various Doctor Who episodes. Journalist Andrew Marr also appears as himself in several scenes depicting news footage.

== Broadcast and reception ==
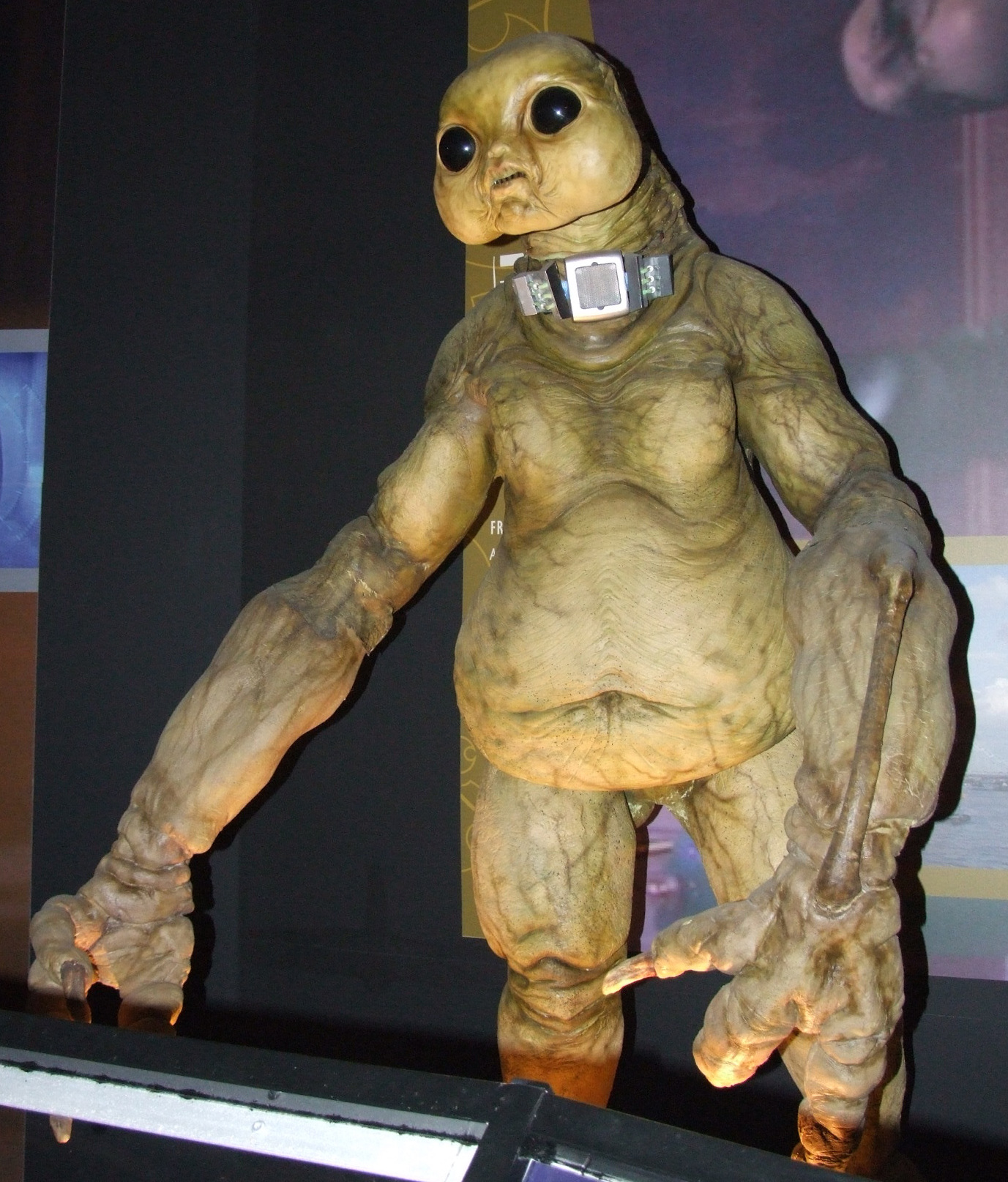
The Slitheen, as they appear at the Doctor Who Experience.

"World War Three" was first broadcast on BBC One on 23 April 2005. It had a live audience of 7.98 million viewers, 350 thousand more than the preceding episode, but 650 thousand less than the next episode. Its audience was over double the audience of the competing ITV1 series Celebrity Wrestling. The episode had a rerun the next day, on BBC Three, garnering an audience of around 170 thousand. It would later be re-broadcast the same evening, which was watched by half a million viewers. The episode received an Audience Appreciation Index score of 81, one lower than "Aliens of London". "World War Three" would later be re-aired in a slightly edited form in Canada on CBC Television on 3 May.

=== Critical reception ===
Alasdair Wilkins of The A.V. Club regarded that "World War Three" received "mixed to poor reception" when it initially aired. Wilkins largely attributed this the negative response to the Slitheen's fart humor in the story. Several critics heavily criticised the Slitheen, citing them as one of the episode's weak points. Many found them played too comedically to the episode's detriment. An audience letter, published in the 6 April 2005 issue of Radio Times, criticized the episode's trailer for "spoiling" the cliffhanger ending of "Aliens of London".

Arnold T Blumburg of Now Playing found that once the Slitheen were out of the plot, the character moments between Rose, Jackie, and Mickey, served as a strong aspect of the episode. In 2013, Patrick Mulkern of Radio Times praised Wilton's performance, as well as Rose's character and the focus on how her travels with the Doctor impacted her personal life. Wilkins similarly positively highlighted the performances of the cast, and in particular highlighted Rose's dynamic with Mickey and Jackie. In the 2012 book Who is the Doctor, authors Graeme Burk and Stacey Smith? both positively highlighted the story, with Burk praising the Slitheen and their fart humor while Smith? highlighted Eccleston and Wilton's performances.

== In print ==
A novelisation of "Aliens of London" and "World War Three" was written by Joseph Lidster under the title Doctor Who: Aliens of London. It is set to be released, alongside Doctor Who: The Satan Pit and Doctor Who: Flesh and Stone, as a paperback on 26 March 2026 as part of the Target Collection. An audiobook version, read by Coduri, will also release on the same day.
