= Aliens of London =

160a – "Aliens of London"
- Doctor Who episode

Cast
- Doctor: Christopher Eccleston – Ninth Doctor
- Companion: Billie Piper – Rose Tyler
- Others: Camille Coduri – Jackie Tyler; Noel Clarke – Mickey Smith; Penelope Wilton – Harriet Jones; Annette Badland – Margaret Blaine; Corey Doabe – Spray Painter; Ceris Jones – Policeman; Jack Tarlton – Tom Hitchingson; Lachele Carl – Trinity Wells; Fiesta Mei Ling – Ru; Basil Chung – Bau; Matt Baker – Himself; Andrew Marr – Himself; Rupert Vansittart – General Asquith; David Verrey – Joseph Green; Navin Chowdhry – Indra Ganesh; Naoko Mori – Doctor Sato; Eric Potts – Oliver Charles; Jimmy Vee – Space Pig; Steve Speirs – Strickland; Elizabeth Fost, Paul Kasey, and Alan Ruscoe – Slitheen

Production
- Directed by: Keith Boak
- Written by: Russell T Davies
- Produced by: Phil Collinson
- Executive producers: Russell T Davies; Julie Gardner; Mal Young
- Music by: Murray Gold
- Production code: 1.4
- Series: Series 1
- Running time: 45 minutes
- First broadcast: 16 April 2005

Chronology
← Preceded by "The Unquiet Dead"	Followed by → "World War Three"

"Aliens of London" is the fourth episode of the first series of the British science fiction television show Doctor Who after its revival in 2005. First broadcast on 16 April 2005 on BBC One, it was written by Russell T Davies and directed by Keith Boak. It is the first in a two-part story, concluding with "World War Three".

The episode is set in London one year after the 2005 episode "Rose". In the episode, the alien crime family the Slitheen fake a spaceship crash-landing in the River Thames, putting the Earth on high alert. The Slitheen use the crashed spaceship to lure experts of extraterrestrial life including the "ultimate expert", the alien time traveller the Ninth Doctor (Christopher Eccleston), into a trap inside 10 Downing Street.

This episode introduced the character of Harriet Jones, played by Penelope Wilton, who would reprise her role in the episodes "The Christmas Invasion" and "The Stolen Earth". It also featured an appearance by actress Naoko Mori, who went on to feature in the spin-off Torchwood as a result of her performance. The Slitheen aliens are part-computer-generated imagery (CGI) and part-prosthetic/costume. "Aliens of London" was watched by seven million viewers on initial broadcast and received generally mixed reviews. However, subsequent evaluations have been more favorable, highlighting the character development, acting, political message, and storyline.

== Plot ==
Intending to return Rose to Earth twelve hours after her original departure, the Ninth Doctor miscalculates, arriving twelve months after they left. Rose's mother Jackie is furious with her, believing that Rose had been abducted and murdered. Rose's boyfriend Mickey is also upset, as he was suspected of murdering Rose. As Rose expresses her frustration to the Doctor over not being able to tell the truth of where she had gone, they witness a spacecraft crash through Big Ben and fall into the River Thames. Central London is shut down while the population becomes excited at the possibility of first contact with an alien species. The Doctor suspects trickery and uses the TARDIS to land inside the hospital where the alien pilot has been taken. The Doctor discovers that the alien craft was launched from Earth and that the pilot is really a common pig that has been modified by alien technology.

The government is unable to locate the Prime Minister due to the confusion of the crash, and Joseph Green MP is named acting Prime Minister. Green is revealed to be a member of the Slitheen, a family of aliens that uses a device to compress their bodies into large human "suits" resulting in frequent releases of flatulence. Two other high members of the government, Margaret Blaine and Oliver Charles, are also revealed to be Slitheen. The Slitheen secretly celebrate luring the humans into their plan but are unaware of their conversation being witnessed by MP Harriet Jones.

When the Doctor returns to Rose, Jackie discovers the truth about the Doctor and the TARDIS and calls it in. They are surrounded by soldiers and escorted to 10 Downing Street. The Doctor is asked to join a panel of alien experts including members of UNIT, and Rose is escorted into the building by Harriet. Harriet tells Rose about the aliens, and together they discover the Prime Minister's corpse. Before they can reveal their discovery, they are caught by Blaine, who begins to unzip her human suit to attack them. At Jackie's flat, a police officer also unzips his human suit and attacks Jackie for being associated with the Doctor. As the Doctor attempts to convince the experts of the forgery of the events, the Doctor realises that the experts have been lured to Downing Street together as part of a trap. Green sends an electrical shock through the assembled group.

== Production ==
The production of the episode was overseen by executive producers Russell T Davies, Julie Gardner and Mal Young, and regular producer Phil Collinson.

=== Conception ===
Initially, the episode was entitled "Aliens of London, Part One". When writing the episode Russell T Davies was inspired by 1958's British science-fiction serial Quatermass and the Pit. He was also inspired by Paul Cornell's novel Human Nature for the idea of an antagonistic family. Davies' decision to have the mobster family Slitheen invade Downing Street was inspired by the Girls Aloud "Jump" music video which takes place there.

The production team had intended to suggest that the murdered Prime Minister in this episode was the current real-life incumbent, Tony Blair. On the DVD commentary for "World War Three", producer Phil Collinson explained that they had hired an actor to play the dead body on the understanding that the man was a Tony Blair impersonator. When the resemblance proved disappointing, they decided to avoid showing the body clearly.

The role of Harriet Jones was written specially for Penelope Wilton by Davies. Wilton was drawn to the role because of the quality of the writing; she had previously worked with Davies on Bob & Rose.

This episode is the last to have the acronym UNIT stand for United Nations Intelligence Taskforce. It was later changed to Unified Intelligence Taskforce in the Tenth Doctor story "The Sontaran Stratagem" after complaints from the real United Nations.

=== Filming ===
"Aliens Of London" was scheduled as part of the first production block along with Rose due to the contemporary setting. The first round of filming took place on 18 July 2004 at the Cardiff Royal Infirmary which was used as the set for Albion Hospital. The exterior of 10 Downing Street was a replica created a week later in Central London, while the interior was filmed in Hensol Castle, Vale of Glamorgan from 4–6, 8–13 and 16–19 August. Filming of the crashed spaceship took place on the 26th, but it was delayed by anti-terrorism officers who were suspicious of the filming's proximity to Downing Street. Filming of Mickey's flat (which is the same set as Jackie's and Rose's) took place over the following four days in Brandon Estate in Kennington. Extra filming took place at Unit Q2 in Newport, from 20 August to 6 September. On 4 October the clip of Blue Peter presenter Matt Baker baking "spaceship cakes" was recorded in BBC Television Centre Studio 4 in London. This took place during the second production block. During the third production block the final piece of location and studio filming was completed in Unit Q2 and Studio 1, HTV Wales respectively.

During recording, the crew realised that the complexity of the first production block had caused them to fall behind schedule and, consequently, additional filming time was prescribed. Composer Murray Gold stated in an interview that the decision to mix CGI and prosthetics caused problems for the production crew.

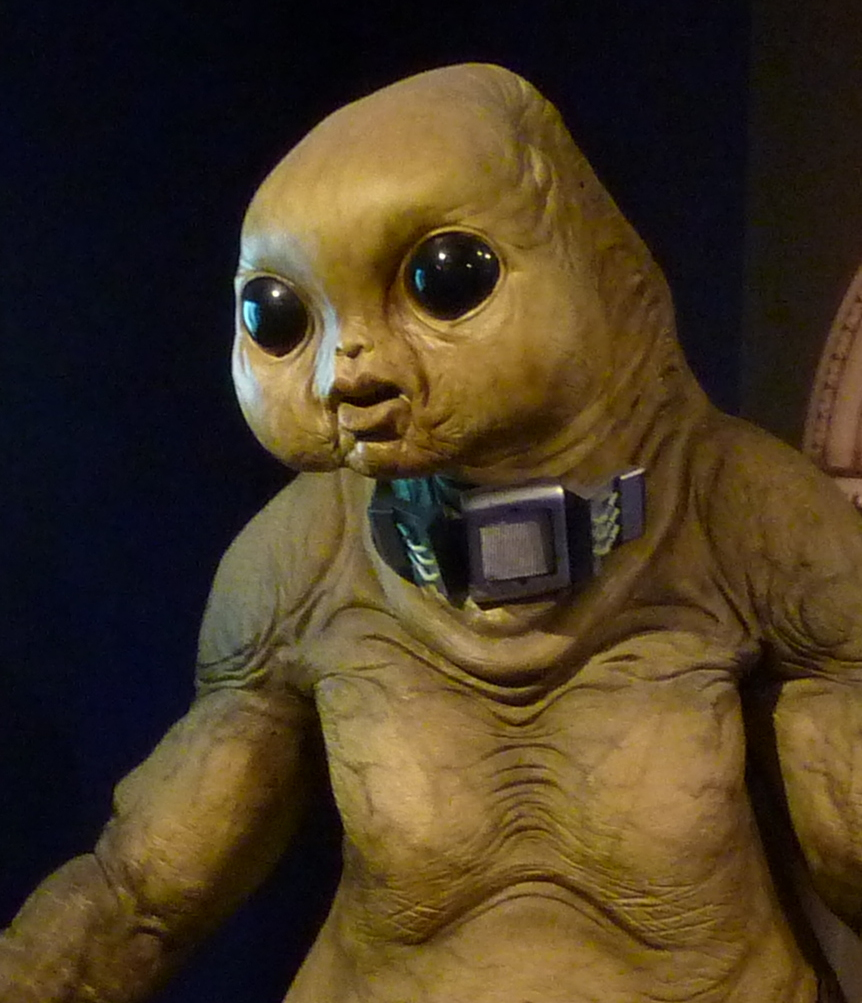
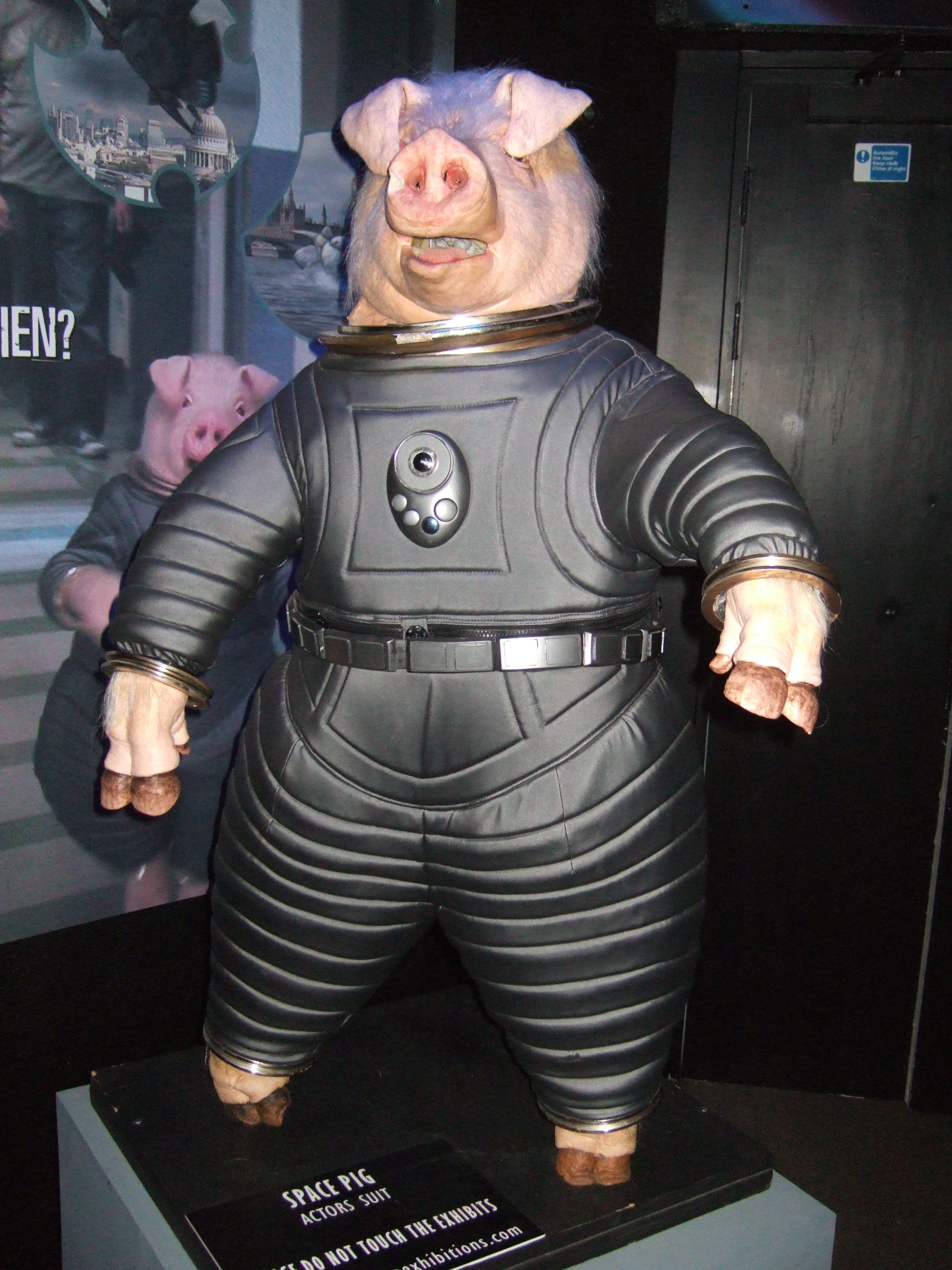
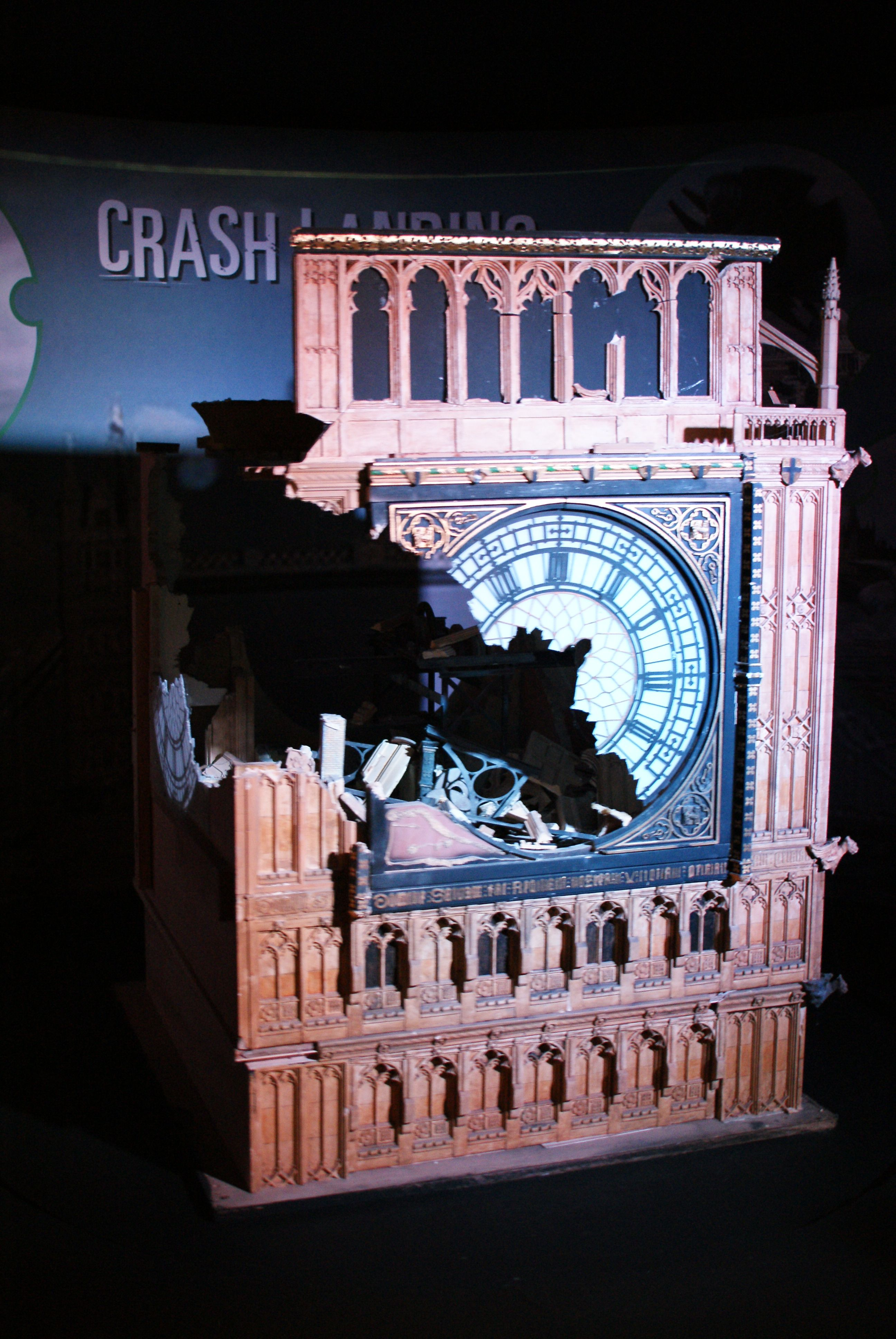
The episode featured many different creatures and props, shown here at various Doctor Who exhibitions.

== Broadcast and reception ==
In an interview, Russell T Davies noted that he had to check with the editorial policy before screening the episode because it clashed with the 2005 United Kingdom general election. Overnight figures showed that "Aliens of London" was watched by seven million viewers in the UK, an audience share of 34%. The episode received an Audience Appreciation Index score of 82. When final ratings were calculated, figures rose to 7.63 million. This episode, together with "World War Three" and "Dalek", were the first released on the UMD format for the PlayStation Portable. The three episodes were then released on a DVD, then later with the rest of series 1 on a box set.

"Aliens of London" received generally mixed reviews. Arnold T Blumburg of Now Playing gave the episode a grade of C. He was positive towards how the story showed what happened to Rose's home life in her absence. In 2013, Patrick Mulkern of Radio Times described the two-parter as "flashy but silly" and thought the storyline of Rose's family worked because of the "vivid" characters. He particularly praised Wilton's performance, describing her character as the "persistent, inquisitive, heart-in-the-right-place Harriet Jones".

The A.V. Club reviewer Alasdair Wilkins gave the episode a grade of B−. He found the problem to be more in the execution than conception; there was a possibility of satire in the fart jokes, but the direction and performances let it down. Because it veered close to being silly and not taking the Slitheen seriously, he argued that the televised version did not display its more nuanced parts, like each Slitheen having individuality, the exploration of the human race knowing about extraterrestrials, and Rose's home life. Burk and Smith in Who is the Doctor were more positive. Burk noted that the story was "loved and hated by fans in equal measure" but it was a "delight" for him, though unexpected. While he found the Slitheen to work on many levels of humour, he stated that the domestic storyline was the best part, elevated by good performances. He also felt the pig worked. Smith called it the closest the new series and Davies "ever gets to pastiching the Classic Series' most beloved writer, Robert Holmes." He also praised the domestic situation, though he found the political satire "one-note", the direction disappointing, and Eccleston "out of his depth" with lighter moments.

There were minor audience complaints with Rose's remark to the Doctor, "You're so gay", generating some controversy. Davies defended himself by saying he was trying to reflect how people talk in real life.

== In print ==
Aliens of London
- Author: Joseph Lidster
- Series: Doctor Who book: Target novelisations
- Publisher: BBC Books
- Publication date: 26 March 2026
- ISBN: 978-1785949975

A novelisation of this episode and "World War Three" written by Joseph Lidster was released as a paperback, ebook, and an audiobook on 26 March 2026 under the title Aliens of London as part of the Target Collection.
