= Slitheen =

Alien crime family in Doctor Who

Raxacoricofallapatorian
- Doctor Who race
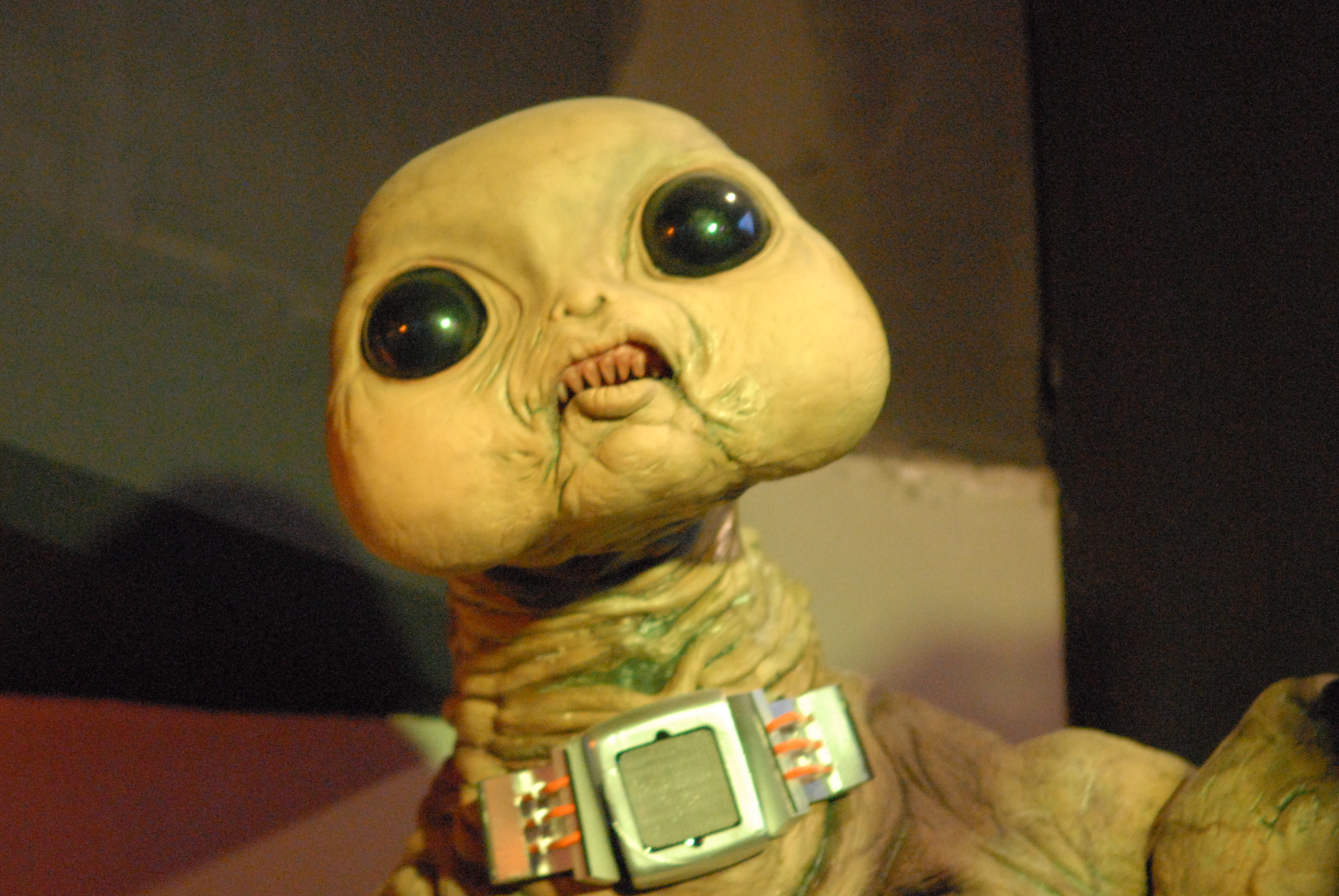
- Slitheen, as shown at the Doctor Who Experience
- First appearance: "Aliens of London" (2005)
- Created by: Russell T Davies

In-universe information
- Home world: Raxacoricofallapatorius
- Affiliation: Various (families)

The Slitheen are a fictional crime family from the British science fiction television series Doctor Who. They belong to a species known as the Raxacoricofallapatorians, an alien lifeform originating from the planet Raxicoricofallapatorius. The Slitheen can disguise themselves as humans by hiding in skinsuits, though the technology they use results in them farting excessively while in disguise. The Slitheen first appeared in the first series of the show's 2005 revival in the two-part story "Aliens of London" and "World War Three", where they attempt to destroy Earth to sell its remains for profit. A single Slitheen, named Blon Fel-Fotch Pasameer-Day Slitheen (Annette Badland), escapes the subsequent destruction of the family at the end of "World War Three", and reappears later in the series in the episode "Boom Town", where she becomes Lord Mayor of Cardiff and attempts to escape the planet by destroying Earth. Subsequently, the Slitheen recur in spin-off media such as comics, books, and audio dramas in Doctor Who. They also appear as major recurring antagonists in the spin-off television series The Sarah Jane Adventures.

The Slitheen were created by Russell T Davies while writing "Aliens of London" and "World War Three", being inspired to write a crime family from various sources. They were conceived to be appealing to children and had several aspects of their character designed around this fact. The Slitheen were portrayed via physical costumes, though partially portrayed by CGI in certain shots.

During filming of their debut episodes, Davies was impressed by the performance of Badland as Blon resulting in Davies bringing her back for "Boom Town" to portray Blon following the events of the two-parter. Subsequently, Davies pitched the concept for spin-off series The Sarah Jane Adventures with the idea of Sarah Jane Smith fighting the Slitheen. This inclusion was cited to be because they were popular with children and would help attract viewers of Doctor Who to The Sarah Jane Adventures. The Slitheen were initially criticised by critics, with many disliking the childish humor and lack of narrative weight they were treated with, however Blon's return in "Boom Town" was highlighted for providing greater depth to the family, with their later character depth receiving analysis. The feasibility of the family in real life has also been explored and analysed.

== Appearances ==
=== Doctor Who ===
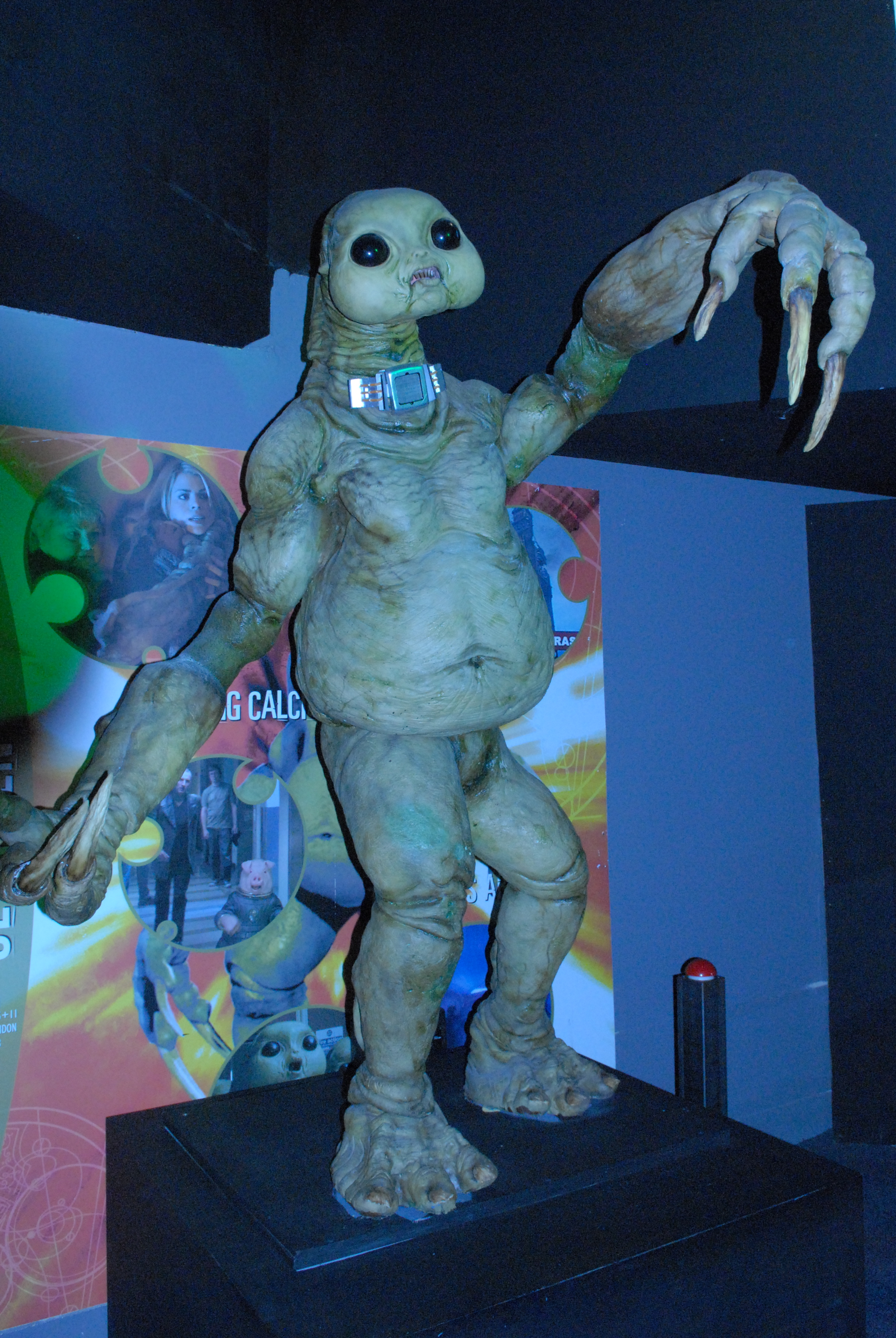
A Slitheen, as seen on display at the Doctor Who Experience

Doctor Who is a long-running British science-fiction television series that began in 1963. It stars its protagonist, The Doctor, an alien who travels through time and space in a ship known as the TARDIS, as well as their travelling companions. When the Doctor dies, they are able to undergo a process known as "regeneration", completely changing the Doctor's appearance and personality. Throughout their travels, the Doctor often comes into conflict with various alien species and antagonists.

The Slitheen are a criminal family of Raxicoricofallapatorians, a species who hail from the planet Raxicoricofallapatorius. They are capable of disguising themselves as humans via skin suits, but the process causes a buildup of "gas exchange", causing the Slitheen to fart while in disguise. They are susceptible to vinegar due to being calcium-based lifeforms, causing them to explode on contact with vinegar.

The Slitheen first appear in the 2005 episodes "Aliens of London" and "World War Three". In the episodes, the Slitheen have infiltrated the Government of the United Kingdom, replacing many key political figures. They crash a spaceship, piloted by a pig, into Big Ben, causing a state of world panic. The family wished to use this paranoia to allow the United Nations to let the government utilise its nuclear arsenal against a supposed alien threat; with this nuclear arsenal, the Slitheen will destroy the planet, selling the leftover chunks as spaceship fuel. The Ninth Doctor and his allies are able to arrange for a Harpoon missile to demolish 10 Downing Street, killing all of the Slitheen and averting the crisis.

A single Slitheen from the invasion survived. Appearing in the 2005 episode "Boom Town", Blon Fel-Fotch Pasameer-Day Slitheen assumed the identity of Margaret Blaine of MI5, and slowly worked her way up to the position of Lord Mayor of Cardiff. Blon planned to channel nuclear power into an alien device, which would allow her to escape the planet at the cost of the planet's destruction. Blon cornered the Ninth Doctor and his allies in the TARDIS, at which point she was exposed to the "heart" of the ship. This reverted her back to an egg, which the Doctor took back to her home planet so she could have a chance at a peaceful life. Following this, a Slitheen appeared in the 2005 mini-episode "Attack of the Graske", in which one is captured by an alien called a Graske. It is released from its prison and attacks the Graske.

==== Spin-off media ====
The Slitheen would appear in several pieces of spin-off media for the series. They appear in the novel The Monsters Inside, in which a pair of them ally with the Doctor to help stop an invasion attempt by the Blathereen. The 2009 novel The Slitheen Excursion depicts the Tenth Doctor attempting to foil a Slitheen plot in ancient Rome. Big Finish audio dramas Death on the Mile and The Taste of Death see further plots by the Slitheen, with the former being thwarted by the Doctor's friend Lady Christina de Souza, while the latter is stopped by the Tenth Doctor.

Blon would re-appear in the 2019 audio drama Sync, which depicted her prior to the events of "Boom Town". Blon investigates a crashed spaceship in the hopes of leaving Earth, finding Suzie Costello at the site. The two work together to stop an alien race called the Elyrians, and the two part ways. She also appeared in the 2017-2018 comic strip A Confusion of Angels, in which she is shown following the events of "Boom Town". Having joined an intergalactic police body known as the Shadow Proclamation, she aids the Twelfth Doctor against robots known as the Heavenly Host.

=== The Sarah Jane Adventures ===
The spin-off television series The Sarah Jane Adventures saw the return of the Slitheen. They first appeared in 2007 episode Revenge of the Slitheen, which depicts the family as they plan to avenge the deaths of the family who invaded Downing Street by shutting off the Sun and destroying Earth. Though the rest of them are killed after their machinery malfunctions and explodes, a child Slitheen named Korst is able to escape. Korst re-appears in 2007 episode The Lost Boy, in which he recruits two other Slitheen to pretend to be character Luke Smith's real parents, forcing Sarah Jane Smith, who had adopted him, to give him back to his supposed "real" family. The Slitheen teamed up with Sarah Jane's alien computer, Mr. Smith to destroy the planet using Luke's intellect, which would allow the Slitheen to avenge their family members' deaths and for Mr. Smith to free other members of his race known as the Xylok. Upon discovering that they would perish before being able to escape the exploding planet, they help Sarah Jane stop Mr. Smith's plan. They leave peacefully following his defeat.

The Slitheen appear again in the 2009 charity special "From Raxacoricofallapatorius with Love", where one masquerades as an alien diplomat to steal Sarah Jane's robot dog K-9. They then re-appear in the 2009 episode The Gift, where a group of Slitheen have their plans seemingly foiled by a group of Blathereen, who are another family that hails from Raxicoricofallapatorius. The Blathereen offer humanity a plant called Rakweed as a peaceful gesture. However, it's revealed that the Blathereen that are present are actually related to the Slitheen, and are criminals. Specialised sound waves are used to destroy the Rakweed, which includes the Rakweed that the Blathereen had eaten, causing the Blathereen to be killed. A Slitheen later makes a brief appearance in The Nightmare Man, in which one captures the main characters before it is killed by Clyde Langer, who throws a bucket of vinegar at it.

== Conception and development ==
=== Doctor Who ===
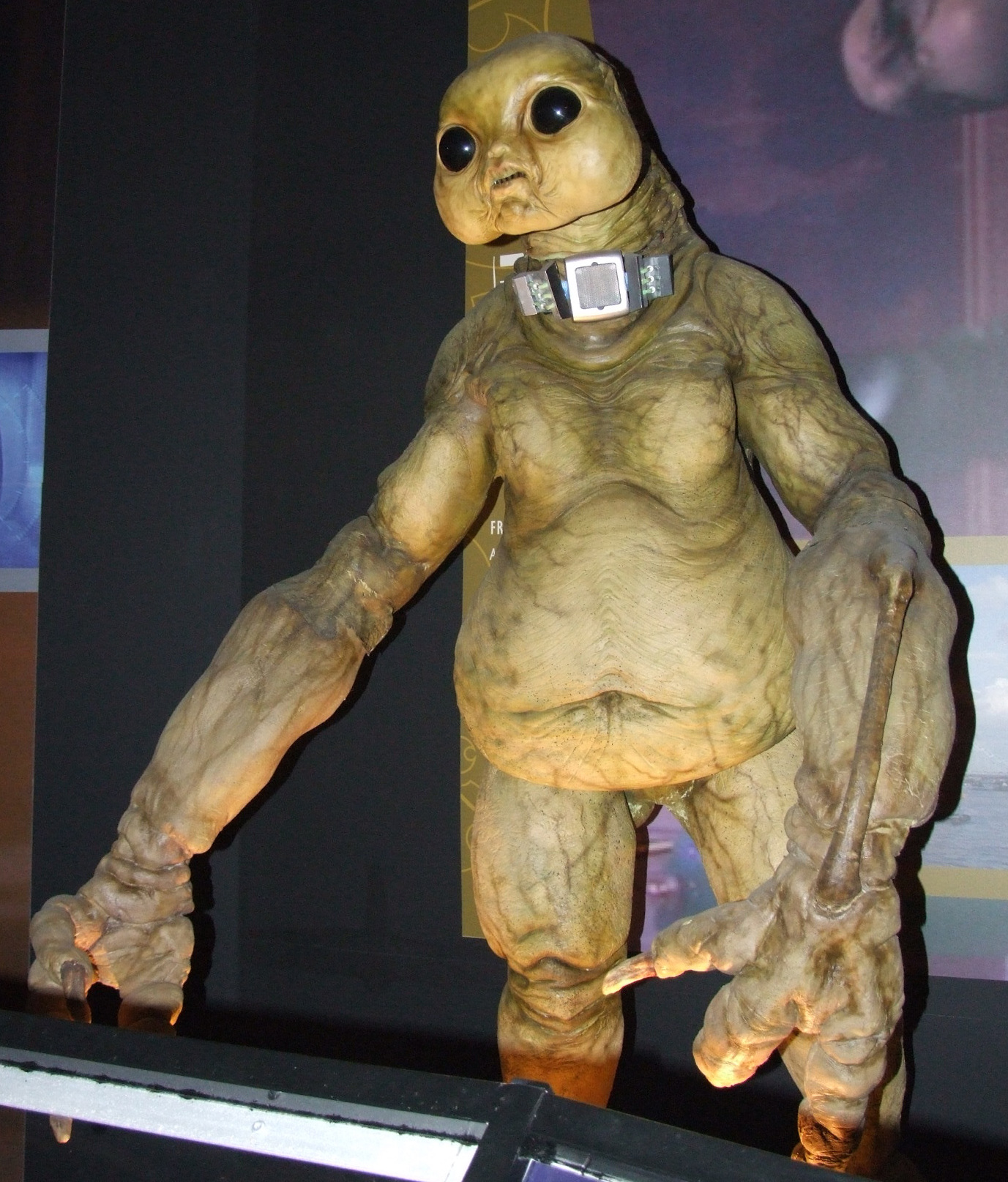
A Slitheen, as it appears at the Doctor Who Experience

Writer and then-showrunner Russell T Davies, while writing "Aliens of London" and "World War Three", was inspired by the BBC2 serial Edge of Darkness. Wanting to do a Doctor Who-themed take on the serial, he conceived the idea of an alien criminal family, which was also partially inspired by the Aubertide family, who had appeared in the Doctor Who spin-off novel Human Nature. Davies put emphasis on the fact the Slitheen had to be "big and green". Wanting to make them appealing to children, he made them fart while disguised and additionally gave them a gimmick children could easily mimic, which became the motion of the Slitheen unzipping their skin suits via a zipper on their foreheads.

Davies' original script describes the Slitheen as being around "eight feet tall", with lots of spikes, a babyish face, a posture akin to an "upright prawn", and slime leaking from their mouths. The design that would be used in the final episode were designed by Edward Thomas and Bryan Hitch, with some alterations made from Davies' original script. The design team at Millenium FX was concerned about the realizability of the Slitheen as physical costumes, and suggested computer-generated imagery be used to depict them instead. Davies insisted the Slitheen be portrayed by actors, leading to the construction of the costumes. The team predicted they would need six weeks to construct the Slitheen costumes, but they only had around three weeks to do so. The costumes used in the episode were constructed on lifecasts, and made out of fibreglass and foam latex. Actors were able to see out of the costumes through the costume's necks, with heads being mounted onto the actor's own. The heads' mouths were able to be radio controlled, though the eyes were not, with CGI being used to depict the eyes blinking. A suggestion to have the actors wear stilts in the costumes to gain extra height was scrapped so the actors would be more comfortable in the costumes.

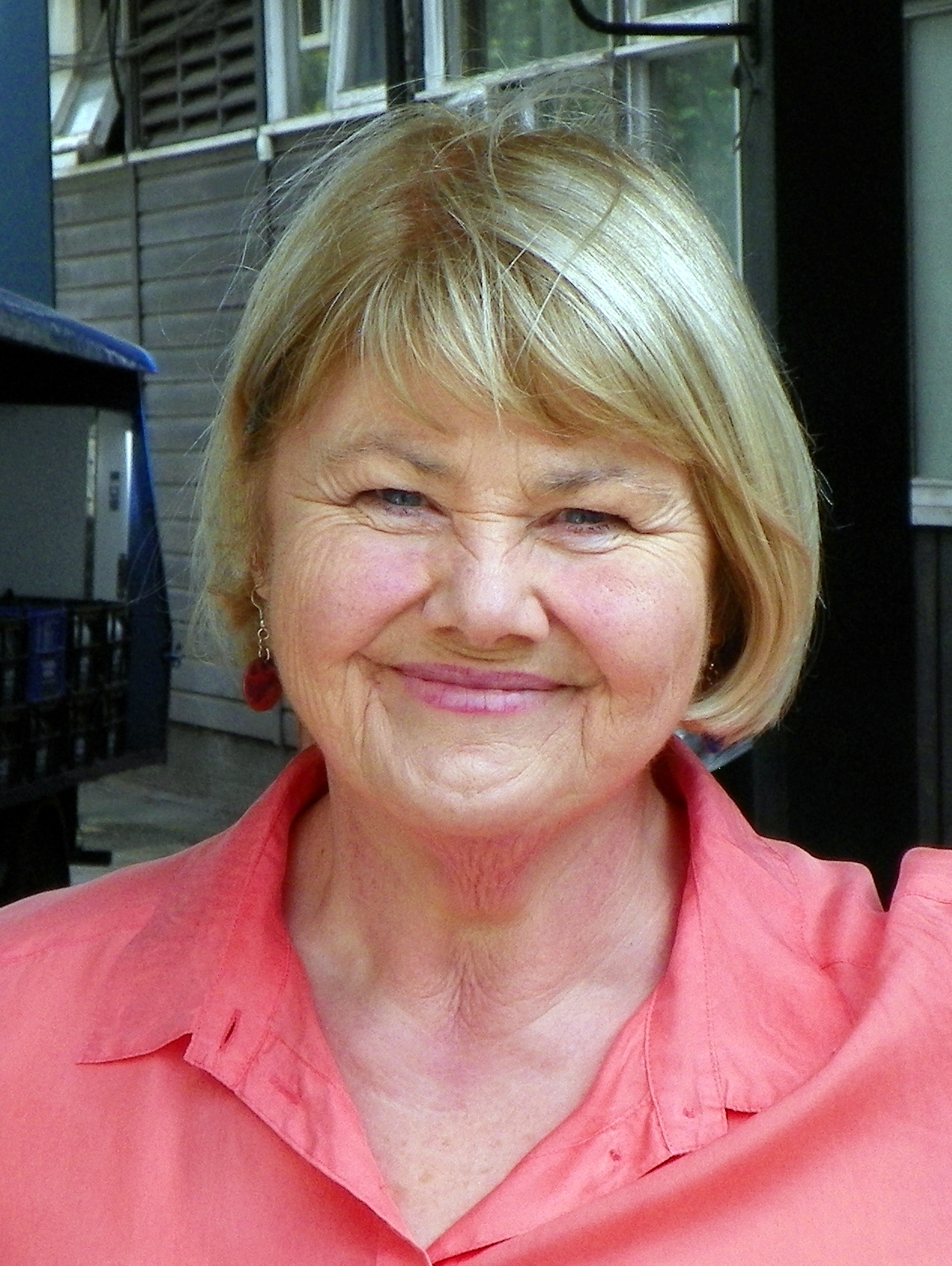
Annette Badland (pictured) portrayed Blon Fel-Fotch Pasameer-Day Slitheen in the series.

When the Slitheen were brought on set, the production team realised that though the costumes were impressive, the Slitheen would have been better realised via CGI. Scenes where the Slitheen had to emerge from their skinsuits were done by having actors wear entirely green costumes, with the skinsuits worn on top, in order to allow for the Slitheen emerging from the suits to be added in post-production via CGI. Slitheen dialogue was read by a crew-member on set, with the dialogue later dubbed on top in post-production. Sequences in which they chased the characters was done via CGI instead of using the costumes.

While filming "World War Three", Davies stood in as the Doctor during rehearsals, at which time he saw Annette Badland's performance as a Slitheen. Impressed, he decided he wanted to bring Badland's character back later in the season. Due to the contents of Doctor Who series 1's eleventh episode not yet having a concrete plan, Davies saw it as an opportunity to revisit Badland's character, Blon Fel-Fotch Pasameer-Day Slitheen. This also helped the episode keep its budget down, as the production team could re-use the Slitheen costumes and CGI models from previous episodes. A Slitheen arm prop was re-used from prior episodes in a scene in which Blon grasps character Rose Tyler in her human disguise, with the prop that was used to portray Blon's egg also being re-used, in this case from the episode "The End of the World" (2005).

The Slitheen were originally planned to appear in 2006 two-part story "The Impossible Planet" and "The Satan Pit", where, now disgraced and seeking to redeem themselves, they would have acted as servants in the episodes. Their role would be replaced by a new creation: the Ood, with the Ood serving a servant role in the family's place. According to Davies, he originally planned for some Slitheen, including a child version of Blon, to appear in "The Stolen Earth" (2008) as a cameo alongside a large number of other monsters from throughout the show's revival. Badland had already recorded her single line for the episode before the scene was cut.

=== The Sarah Jane Adventures ===
The original pitch for The Sarah Jane Adventures was the idea of "Sarah Jane versus the Slitheen." The Slitheen were considered optimal monsters for the series for several reasons: the physical costumes allowed them to physically interact with the cast, which was important to the design team, and they were popular with children, which would help bring some of the general Doctor Who audience onto The Sarah Jane Adventures. This resulted in the Slitheen's role as the main antagonists of Revenge of the Slitheen. Several new costumes were created for the family, as the original costumes from Doctor Who had deteriorated due to their display at public exhibitions. The production team for the series wanted them to return for the finale of the show's first series, thus resulting in their presence in The Lost Boy.

A story focusing on the Blathereen, another family of the same species as the Slitheen, was planned for the show's third series, which eventually became The Gift. The main difficulty with the script ended up being how to determine the Blathereen's role as antagonists, with different iterations of the script painting the Blathereen as only accidentally evil, or with only one of the Blathereen being evil. Towards the end of the writing, it was decided to make the Blathereen related to the Slitheen to justify the Blathereen's villainous actions. The Blathereen were originally planned to be depicted with repainted Slitheen costumes, though it was eventually decided that the Blathereen would have new costumes constructed for them. These new costumes were regardless painted orange to distinguish them visually from the Slitheen. The original script would have depicted the Blathereen using Rakweed, then called Yorrum Grass, to convert Earth into a new Raxicoricofallapatorius. The Slitheen would have had a larger role, with Sarah Jane and the others allying with a child Slitheen to stop the spread before the child betrayed them for the Blathereen. The episode would have ended with them being handed over to military organisation UNIT, with the child Slitheen declaring revenge.

== Reception and analysis ==
Writing for Radio Times in a review of "Aliens of London", Patrick Mulkern criticised the Slitheen as childish, stating that "The Slitheen will never work for me. It speaks volumes that the costumes were often reused in the more child-oriented The Sarah Jane Adventures and have been left to rot since Steven Moffat took over Doctor Who." Arnold T. Blumburg, writing for Now Playing, highlighted the Slitheen costumes as "nicely designed monsters," though criticized the usage of zippers on their in-universe skin suits, as well as the childish humor surrounding the Slitheen. Alasdair Wilkins, writing for The A.V. Club, defended the Slitheen's associated fart humor, but criticized how the two-parter doesn't "...take the Slitheen themselves seriously," citing his disappointment, "...because there's plenty of intelligence in how the two-parter portrays the Slitheen." The Slitheen have been characterised as an example of external forces influencing the government from within in media. Marc DiPaolo, writing about political satire in Doctor Who, cited the family as an example of this satire; he stated that the Slitheen acted "as an allegorized dramatization of the 9/11 conspiracy theory presented by Thierry Meyssan in the book L'Effroyable imposture," comparing the Slitheen's plot of using the UK government to cause domestic terror to the conspiracy theory that the US President George W. Bush staged the September 11 attacks.

Graham Sleight, writing in The Doctor's Monsters: Meanings of the Monstrous in Doctor Who, stated that the Slitheen acted as creatures that acted as a "compilation album of good bits", with different aspects of the monsters existing only to serve certain roles within individual scenes. Sleight highlighted "Boom Town" for expanding on the Slitheen and giving them greater depth as monsters, allowing them to be creatures who can be good or evil and be judged as individuals, not just for who they are. Mulkern, in his review of "Boom Town", praised Badland's performance in the episode, highlighting the nuance brought to the role by her, which Mulkern believed helped offset the sillier aspects of the Slitheen and bring unexpected depth to the character.

Priya Dixit, writing in the piece Relating to Difference: Aliens and Alienness in "Doctor Who" and International Relations, stated that the show's expansion of the character of Blon helped to illustrate that, despite the traditional views of aliens as Others, aliens were just like humans, and are only judged to be different when viewed from a human-centric standpoint. Dixit describes how the Slitheen's farting factors into this, as the Slitheen are seen as "alien" or "abnormal" for their frequent farting, despite the fact this farting is not inherently an alien concept. Victoria Byard, in the book British Television Drama: Past, Present, and Future, characterises the Slitheen in relation to Sarah Jane and her role as a mother, citing a moment in which a pair of Slitheen beg for her to let their child live. It opines this as an example of emphasising her new role as a mother through the child's parallels to the recently adopted Luke Smith, as well as showing how Sarah Jane's identity was recontextualised as a result of her new role.

A physics paper for The University of Leicester calculated the force of the Slitheen's compression fields, which are used to help them fit in their skinsuits in universe. The book The Science of Doctor Who analysed the scientific realism of the Slitheen's compression field technology and their status as calcium-based lifeforms, with the book deeming both to be likely impossible to exist in real-life. The Slitheen were cited by the piece Listening from behind the sofa? The (un)earthly roles of sound in BBC Wales' Doctor Who as destabilising the usual "voice-body" relationship present in media via the fact they had two forms (human and Slitheen) with the same voice.
