= Army of Ghosts =

177a – "Army of Ghosts"
- Doctor Who episode

Cast
- Doctor: David Tennant – Tenth Doctor
- Companion: Billie Piper – Rose Tyler
- Others: Camille Coduri – Jackie Tyler; Noel Clarke – Mickey Smith; Tracy-Ann Oberman – Yvonne Hartman; Raji James – Dr Rajesh Singh; Freema Agyeman – Adeola; Hadley Fraser – Gareth; Oliver Mellor – Matt; Barbara Windsor – Peggy Mitchell; Derek Acorah, Alistair Appleton, Trisha Goddard – themselves; Paul Kasey – Cyber Leader; Nicholas Briggs – Dalek and Cyberman voices; Barnaby Edwards, Nicholas Pegg, Stuart Crossman, Anthony Spargo, Dan Barrett, David Hankinson – Dalek Operators

Production
- Directed by: Graeme Harper
- Written by: Russell T Davies
- Produced by: Phil Collinson
- Executive producers: Russell T Davies; Julie Gardner
- Music by: Murray Gold
- Series: Series 2
- Running time: 1st of 2-part story, 45 minutes
- First broadcast: 1 July 2006

Chronology
← Preceded by "Fear Her"	Followed by → "Doomsday"

"Army of Ghosts" is the twelfth and penultimate episode of the second series of the British science fiction television programme Doctor Who which was first broadcast on BBC One on 1 July 2006. It is the first episode of a two-part story; the concluding episode, "Doomsday", was first broadcast on 8 July.

The episode is set in London, some time after the events of the episode "Love & Monsters". In the episode, the Cybermen come to Earth from a parallel world by following a spherical ship through an interdimensional breach. The Torchwood Institute intends to open this breach further for use as an energy source.

== Plot ==
Jackie shows the Tenth Doctor and Rose a vaguely humanoid and luminous silhouette that momentarily appears in her flat, which Jackie insists is the ghost of her deceased father. Jackie explains that for the past two months, millions of ghosts began appearing all over the world. Humans have come to accept them and believe that they are the manifestations of loved ones.

Conducting an experiment, the Doctor determines that the ghosts are in fact impressions of something forcing its way into this universe. The Doctor tracks the signal back and uses the TARDIS to travel there with Rose and Jackie, arriving at the Torchwood Institute in Canary Wharf. The Doctor and Jackie are taken by soldiers to see Torchwood's director Yvonne Hartman, while the TARDIS is impounded with Rose inside. Yvonne shows the Doctor the invisible breach which is the source of the ghost energy, along with a ship which came through the breach: a "Void ship", designed to exist in the space between universes known as the Void. Torchwood built One Canada Square (Note: The episode colloquially refers to the "Torchwood Tower" building as "Canary Wharf".) around the breach and conducted experiments on it, forcing it open in an attempt to harness it as a source of energy. Yvonne also reveals to the Doctor that his encounter with Queen Victoria made him an enemy of the state and was the catalyst for the creation of Torchwood. (Note: As depicted in the 2006 episode "Tooth and Claw".)

Meanwhile, Rose, masquerading as a Torchwood employee, slips out of the TARDIS, and gains access to the sphere chamber, where she finds Mickey, also disguised as Torchwood staff. An advance guard of Cybermen subvert and manipulate three employees into initiating an unscheduled ghost shift to forcibly open the breach, causing millions of ghosts to appear across the globe before they materialise into their true form, the Cybermen. At the same time the Cybermen arrive, the sphere suddenly activates and begins to open. The Cybermen are similarly oblivious to the origins of the sphere; they simply followed its course through the breach.

In the sphere chamber, Mickey explains to Rose that after a battle in the parallel universe (Note: The parallel universe previously appeared in the 2006 episodes "Rise of the Cybermen" and "The Age of Steel".) the Cybermen mysteriously disappeared. He happened upon their means of escape and returned to his native universe with the intention of stopping them. Mickey believes that the Cybermen are in control of the sphere and produces a gun to destroy whatever is in it. Rose is horrified when the sphere opens and reveals its occupants to be four Daleks.

=== Continuity ===
The majority of this episode takes place in the Torchwood Institute, which is seen on screen for the first time. The phrase "Torchwood" originated from an anagram of Doctor Who used to conceal the "rushes" tapes during the filming of the first series. It was an arc word used through the majority of the second series, starting with the series one episode "Bad Wolf".

The episode's secondary plot device is the Cybermen, from the parallel universe featured in "Rise of the Cybermen" and "The Age of Steel". The Cybermen breaking through plastic sheets is a recurring theme throughout Cybermen appearances, in particular, The Tomb of the Cybermen (1967), The Invasion (1968) and Earthshock (1982). The concept of a CyberKing, mentioned by Mickey, would eventually come to pass in "The Next Doctor" (2008).

The episode is also the first in which Freema Agyeman appears, although she is not playing the role of Martha Jones, which she would play in series 3, but a minor character named Adeola (who is later revealed to be Martha's cousin). Russell T Davies admired Agyeman's performance as Adeola and called her back to fill the role of companion that Piper had chosen to leave.

== Production ==
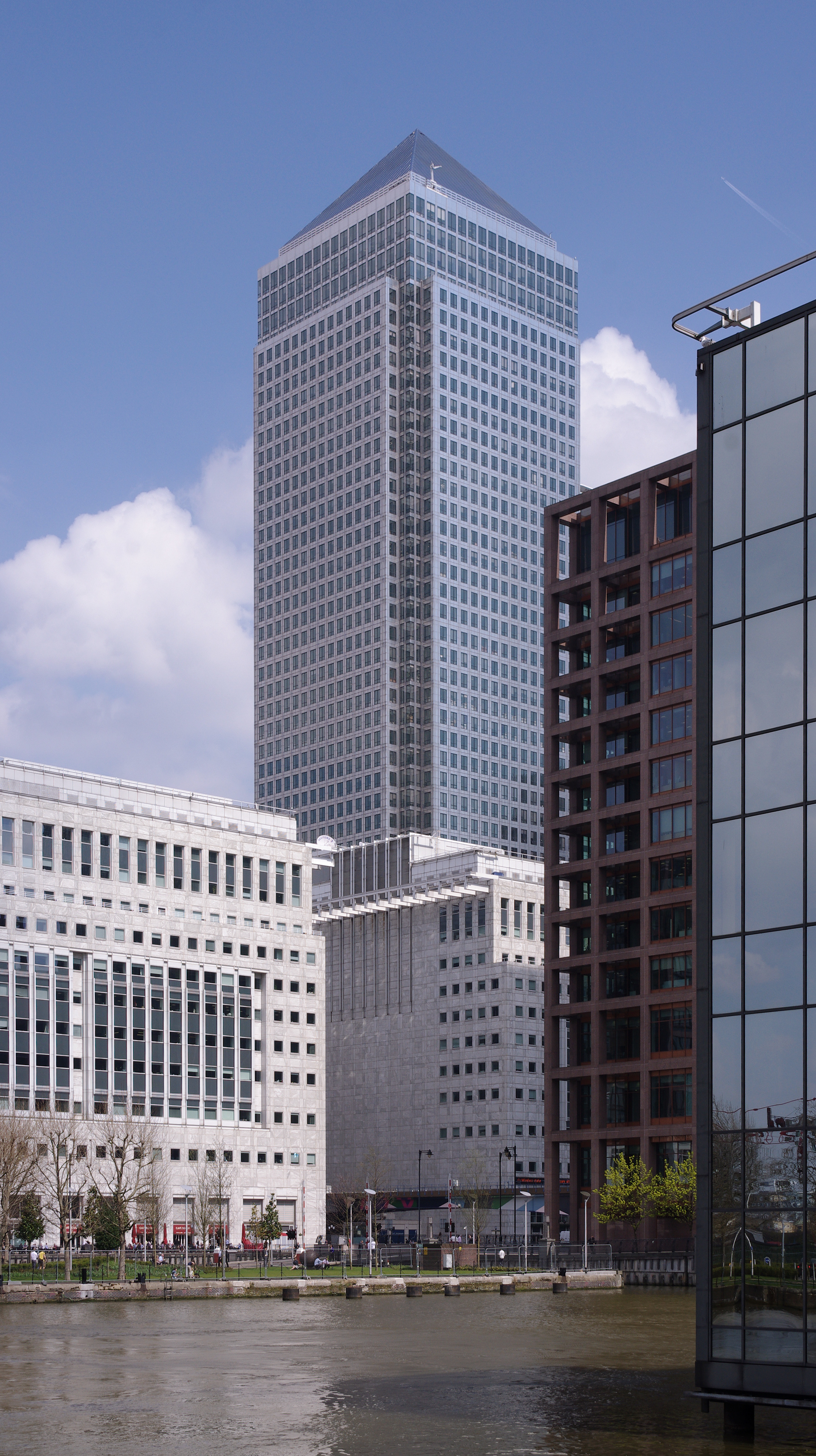
One Canada Square is used as the facade for the fictional Torchwood Tower.

To ensure that Noel Clarke and Shaun Dingwall (Mickey Smith and Pete Tyler, respectively) were available for filming, the story was filmed in the season's third production block along with "Rise of the Cybermen" and "The Age of Steel". Filming for the story started on 2 November 2005 on location in Kennington, but this story did not become the primary focus of the production crew until 29 November, when filming began on the scenes in and around the sphere chamber. Scenes in the lever room, the main setting for the story, were filmed between 12 and 15 December, and 3 and 5 January 2006.

The episode also features references to other programmes by the BBC. The most notable of these is the cameo of Barbara Windsor as Peggy Mitchell in EastEnders, where she bars a ghost, who she presumes to be Den Watts, from The Queen Victoria. Watts, presumed killed in 1989, had returned to the soap in 2003, before being killed a second time in 2005 after being written out of the show. Other British TV personalities appearing in the episode are Trisha Goddard, Alistair Appleton and Derek Acorah, appearing as themselves. Additionally, the shot of One Canada Square is taken from the opening credits of The Apprentice. A programme with the same name as a controversial broadcast in 1992 by the BBC, Ghostwatch, also appears in the show.

Location shooting took place at the Coal Exchange and Mount Stuart Square, Cardiff Bay.

== Broadcast and reception ==
To keep the appearance of the Daleks secret, the final scene was removed from all preview tapes and replaced with a title card reading "final scene withheld until transmission", including the copy given to the Doctor Who microsite's "fear forecast" team.

The episode was watched by 8.19 million viewers, and was the seventh most watched programme of the week, behind four World Cup games and two episodes of Coronation Street. The Companion episode of Doctor Who Confidential gained 570,000 viewers. The episode's Appreciation Index was 86, above the average baseline of 77 for drama series.

The episode was generally well reviewed by critics. The Stage commented that the episode was "a tense contest, full of drama, tears, adversity and two powerful forces coming face to face in the ultimate battle" while mockingly downplaying the England football team's defeat earlier that evening. The author of the review then stated that the cliffhanger increased his affection of the show. The Guardian commented that the episode was "Who back at its best" while The People complimented the humour of the scene of the Doctor channel surfing. Jacob Clifton of Television Without Pity gave the episode an A− rating. Ahsan Haque of IGN gave the episode 9.8 out of 10 (Incredible), and complimented the pacing of the episode and the revelation of both the Cybermen and the Daleks, concluding that "you couldn't ask for a better cliffhanger".

After its initial airing, the episode was released on DVD with "Fear Her" and "Doomsday" on 25 September 2006. The story ("Army of Ghosts"/"Doomsday") was nominated for the 2007 Hugo Award for Best Dramatic Presentation, Short Form.
