= Fear Her =

176 – "Fear Her"
- Doctor Who episode

Cast
- Doctor: David Tennant – Tenth Doctor
- Companion: Billie Piper – Rose Tyler
- Others: Nina Sosanya – Trish; Abisola Agbaje – Chloe Webber; Edna Doré – Maeve; Tim Faraday – Tom's Dad; Abdul Salis – Kel; Richard Nichols – Driver; Erica Eirian – Neighbour; Stephen Marzella – Police Officer; Huw Edwards – Commentator (Note: Becky Wright voiced the commentator in the 2025 release.)

Production
- Directed by: Euros Lyn
- Written by: Matthew Graham
- Produced by: Phil Collinson
- Executive producers: Russell T Davies; Julie Gardner
- Music by: Murray Gold
- Production code: 2.11
- Series: Series 2
- Running time: 45 minutes
- First broadcast: 24 June 2006

Chronology
← Preceded by "Love & Monsters"	Followed by → "Army of Ghosts"

"Fear Her" is the eleventh episode of the second series of the British science-fiction series Doctor Who, first broadcast on BBC One on 24 June 2006. It was written by Matthew Graham and directed by Euros Lyn.

The episode takes place in London on the day of the 2012 Summer Olympics opening ceremony. In the episode, the alien time traveller the Doctor (David Tennant) and his travelling companion Rose Tyler (Billie Piper) investigate the lonely girl Chloe Webber (Abisola Agbaje), who has the ability to make people disappear by drawing them.

The episode was brought in to be a low-budget replacement for a script by Stephen Fry that had been pushed back. Location work was filmed mainly in the Tremorfa area of Cardiff in January 2006, with other scenes shot in Cardiff and in the studio in Newport in January and February. Graham was asked to write an episode primarily for children which would soften the much darker finale that would be broadcast after. The episode was watched by 7.14 million viewers in the UK, and was given an Appreciation Index of 83. The episode received praise from reviewers for the acting and the housing estate setting, but was criticised for having a "formulaic" and "ordinary" plot which "plods along". Graham received letters from children who enjoyed the episode, while also later discovering that adult fans' reactions were poor.

== Plot ==
In London, on the day of the opening ceremony of the 2012 Olympic Games, the Tenth Doctor and Rose investigate the disappearance of three children and a spot of fresh tarmac which cars momentarily break down on. They realise that the source of the problems is a solitary 12-year-old girl named Chloe Webber. She has the unique ability to cause people to disappear by drawing them, causing Dale Hicks, Danny Edwards and Jane McKillen to go missing. The Doctor hypnotises Chloe and finds out that she is possessed by an immature Isolus, an alien that travels through space with a family of four billion siblings. Six days ago, this particular Isolus crashed its pod to Earth due to a solar flare. The Isolus relates to and befriends Chloe, who had a troubled childhood. The Isolus has also caused Chloe to draw a life-sized, exaggerated figure of her late, abusive father.

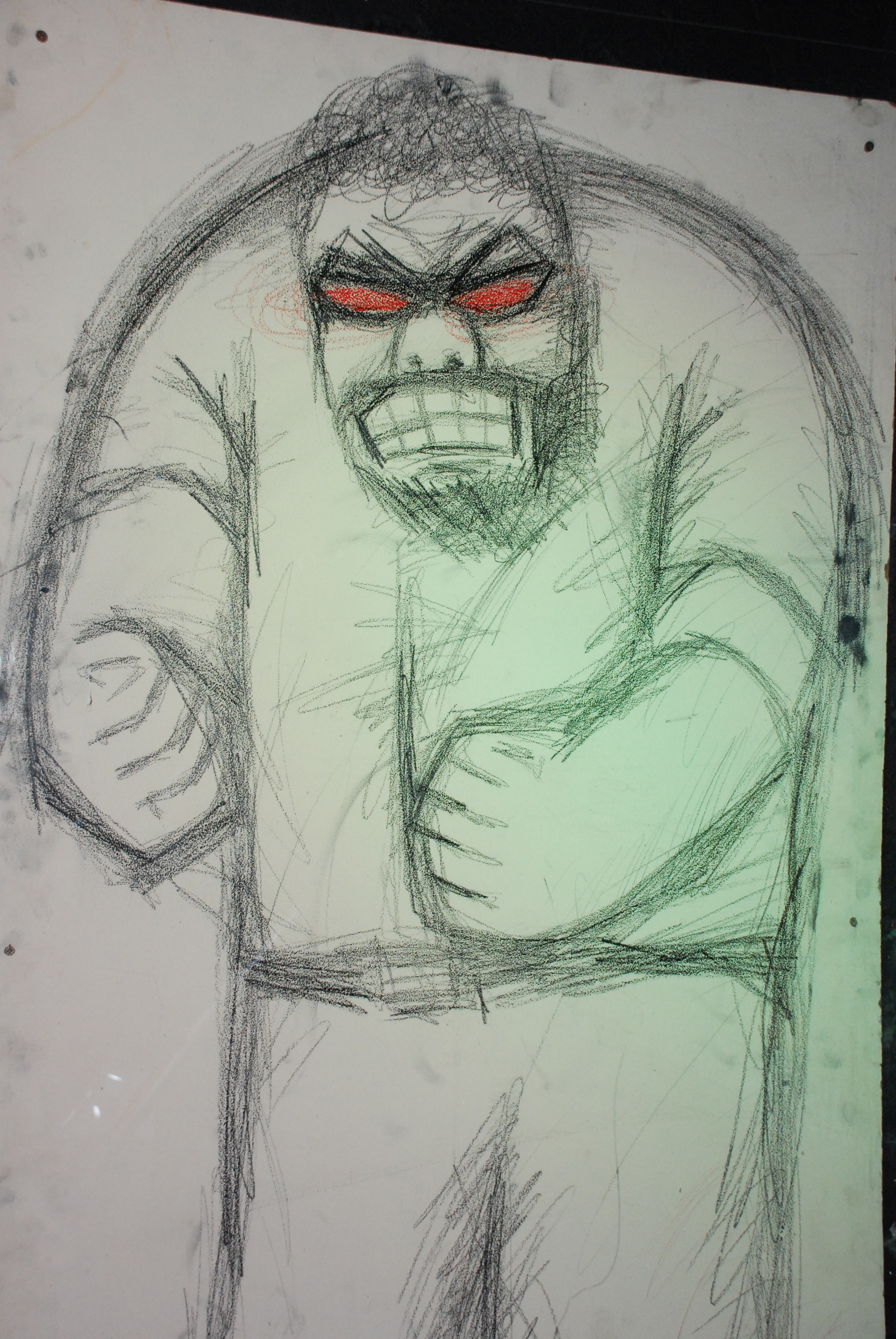
Chloe's image of her father, on display at a Doctor Who exhibition

The Doctor explains that if they can find the Isolus pod and provide it power, the alien will leave Chloe. A frantic Chloe draws the TARDIS and the Doctor, trapping them both in one of her sketches and forcing Rose to try to find the pod herself. She rationalises that the pod is located on the hottest spot on the street, a patch of fresh tarmac, and digs it up with council equipment. Meanwhile, Chloe has caused the entire crowd at the Olympic stadium to disappear and now is set on making everyone in the world disappear. Rose realises that the pod is powered by both heat and emotion and throws it towards the Olympic Torch—a symbol of hope, fortitude, courage, and love—as it passes down the street. The missing children and the crowd at the Olympics reappear, and Rose realises that the drawing Chloe had made of her father will similarly come to life. Chloe and her mother, Trish, are able to calm Chloe by singing the "Kookaburra" song, causing the unseen monster—having fed off of Chloe's emotions and fears—to disappear.

As the torch bearer approaches the Olympic Stadium he collapses, and the Doctor promptly and suddenly appears, picks up the torch, and completes the run to light the Olympic Flame. The heat of the flame and the emotion of the crowd power the pod, allowing the Isolus to leave Chloe and return home.

== Production ==
=== Writing ===
"Fear Her" was an overcommissioned episode, which replaced a planned but unproduced script, known as "Doctor Who and the Green Knight", by Stephen Fry. Writer Matthew Graham was told by showrunner Russell T Davies that it was going to be an inexpensive episode and had to take place on a housing estate, but Graham was nevertheless thrilled to be asked to write an episode. Graham stated in 2011 that they "set out to do right from the start" making the episode more aimed at children, rather than adults and older Doctor Who fans, as the much darker finale would be broadcast following it. Davies specifically asked Graham to write for his seven-year-old son.

Early drafts of this episode were titled "Chloe Webber Destroys the Earth", and later, "You're a Bad Girl, Chloe Webber", with one such draft having the episode take place on another planet.

=== Casting and filming ===
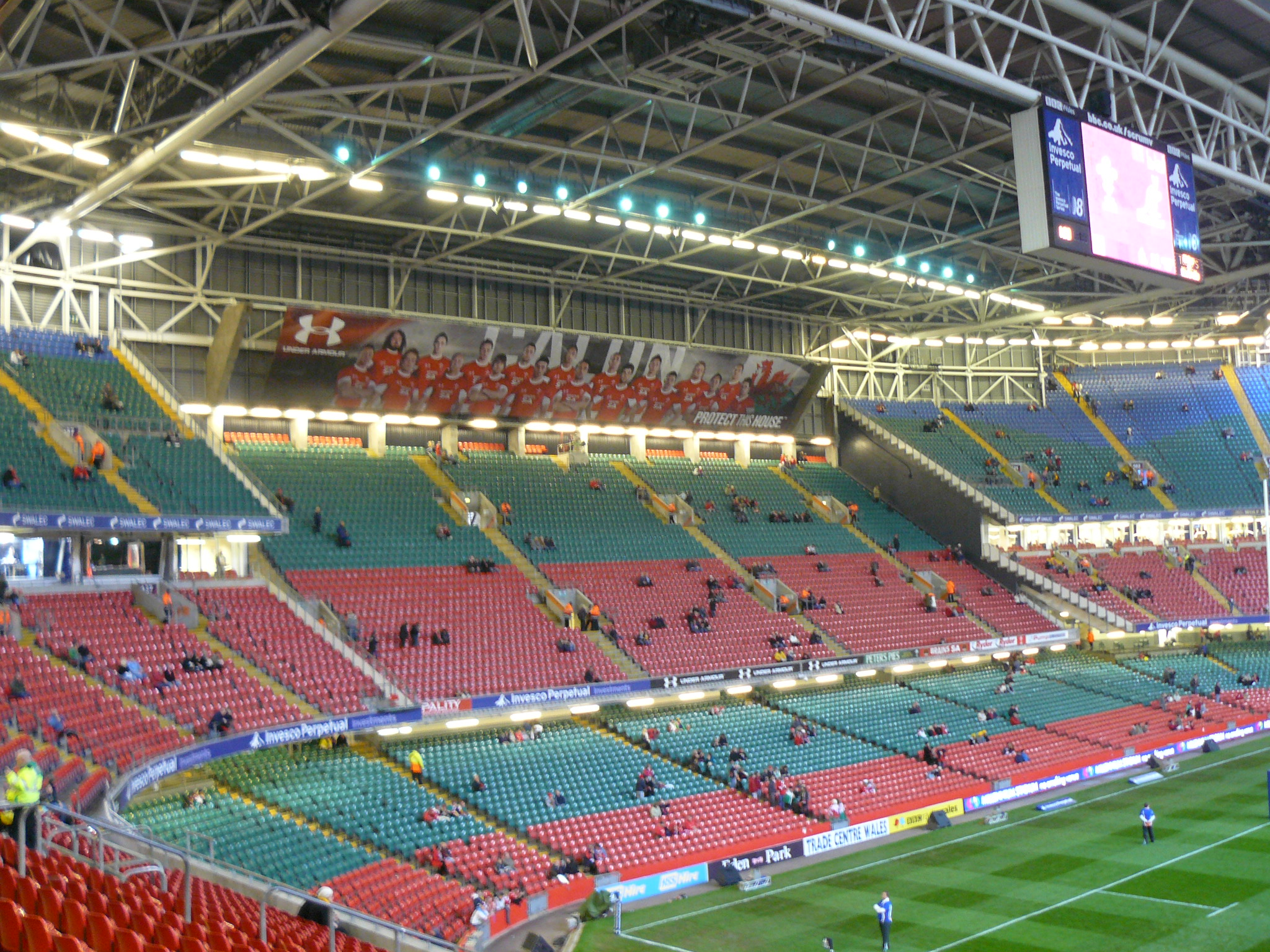
The Millennium Stadium in Cardiff was used for the Olympic Stadium.

Abisola Agbaje, who portrayed Chloe, was discovered at an after-school drama club, where casting director Andy Pryor had held auditions for the part. Agbaje had to play both Chloe's normal character and her character while being possessed by the Isolus, which Agbaje felt was "weird". When performing as the Isolus she had to whisper, and an echo was added in post-production. Agbaje found it "a bit hard to whisper" because she had a husky voice. A hand double for Agbaje drew the pictures, while the series's storyboarder Shaun Williams drew the father in the cupboard.

== Broadcast and reception ==
"Fear Her" was broadcast in the United Kingdom on BBC One on 24 June 2006. Overnight UK figures for the first broadcast of "Fear Her" was 6.6 million viewers, with a 39.7% audience share. Final consolidated ratings rose to 7.14 million, making it the twelfth most-watched programme on the channel for the week. The episode received an Appreciation Index of 83.

=== Critical reception ===
IGN's Ahsan Haque gave the episode a 5 out of 10 rating, calling it "flat and formulaic" and everything about it was "slightly underwhelming", though he thought what did work was the mother-daughter teamwork at the end and Agbaje being "sufficiently capable and creepy" as the possessed Chloe Webber. He also noted "annoying self-aggrandizing moments that made no sense and served only to make the episode feel unnecessarily campy", such as the audience disappearing from the stadium and the Doctor carrying the torch. Comparing the episode to "The Idiot's Lantern" in terms of plot, he felt that the latter was "far more entertaining" and that "Fear Her" lacked originality and humour. Dave Bradley of SFX awarded "Fear Her" three out of five stars, describing the plot as "ordinary" but thought it was "a decent breather before grander adventures to come". He particularly praised the dialogue and thought "the claustrophobic effect of limiting the action to one household works". Arnold T Blumburg, writing for Now Playing, gave the episode a grade of B+. He felt that the guest cast were "only just adequate", describing Agbaje's acting as "decent but not impressive", and that the story "plods along in places", but the story worked because of the "delightful" interactions between the Doctor and Rose and the feel-good ending.

In 2011, SFX published an article stating arguments for and against the episode. The "Defence" stated that, while some minor roles were played "broadly", Sosanya and Agbaje were "extremely good", defined Rose's role as an Inspector Lewis to the Doctor's Morse as "great to see", and opined that the unusual things happening in a typical housing estate and the lack of appearance from a monster were effective. The "Prosecution", on the other hand, described it as a "cheap filler" with a "cheesy" finale and called the lack of a monster a "severe disappointment". Topless Robot named it the third worst Tenth Doctor episode. In a poll conducted by Doctor Who Magazine in 2009 which asked readers to rank all 200 stories that had been released, "Fear Her" fell at 192 out of 200, making it the lowest-ranked story of the revived series.

Graham was happy with the episode himself and received letters from "loads of kids" who enjoyed it. When discovering that older fans had reacted negatively, he thought, "Well, it's a shame that they have, but it wasn't meant for them".

=== Huw Edwards controversy ===
In August 2024, the episode was removed from BBC iPlayer after guest star Huw Edwards pleaded guilty to making indecent images of children. The episode was reinstated in February 2025, with Edwards's voice performance replaced by Becky Wright.
