= Doctor Who series 2 =

2006 season of British sci-fi TV series

Doctor Who
- Series 2
- DVD box set cover art
- Showrunner: Russell T Davies
- Starring: David Tennant; Billie Piper
- No. of stories: 10
- No. of episodes: 13 (+1 special)

Release
- Original network: BBC One
- Original release: 15 April – 8 July 2006

Series chronology
- ← Previous; Series 1 Next → Series 3

The second series of the British science fiction programme Doctor Who was preceded by the Christmas special "The Christmas Invasion" broadcast on 25 December 2005. A regular series of thirteen episodes was broadcast weekly in 2006, starting with "New Earth" on 15 April and concluding with "Doomsday" on 8 July. In addition, two short special episodes were produced; a Children in Need special and an interactive episode, as well as thirteen minisodes titled Tardisodes. It is the second series of the revival of the show, and the twenty-eighth season overall.

It is the first series to feature David Tennant as the tenth incarnation of the Doctor, an alien Time Lord who travels through time and space in his TARDIS, which appears to be a British police box on the outside. The Doctor continues to travel with his companion Rose Tyler (Billie Piper), with whom he has grown increasingly attached. They also briefly travel with Rose's boyfriend Mickey Smith (Noel Clarke), and Rose's mother Jackie (Camille Coduri). The series is connected by a loose story arc consisting of the recurring word "Torchwood". This is also the first series to be preceded by a Christmas special, whose success led to the festive special becoming an annual tradition.

The Cybermen were reintroduced with a new origin story set in a parallel universe. In the "Rise of the Cybermen" and "The Age of Steel" two-part story, the Doctor and his companions crash land in a parallel London where the Cybermen are being created on modern-day Earth. The Cybermen reappear in the 2006 two-part finale "Army of Ghosts" and "Doomsday", exploiting a breach between universes to invade the Doctor's Earth.

Russell T Davies returned as the head writer for the series. The production of all episodes was overseen by Phil Collinson, while Julie Gardner took on the role of executive producer. The musical score was composed by Murray Gold. Most of the filming was conducted in Cardiff, Wales. The critical reception was overwhelmingly positive, with the series garnering acclaim for its writing, themes, performances, and production values, culminating in multiple awards, including five accolades at the BAFTA Cymru Awards.

== Episodes ==
No. story	No. in series	Title	Directed by	Written by	Original release date	Prod. code	UK viewers (millions)	AI
Special
167	–	"The Christmas Invasion"	James Hawes	Russell T Davies	25 December 2005	2X	9.84	84
Rose Tyler and the newly regenerated Tenth Doctor return to her mother Jackie's flat, where her mother and former boyfriend Mickey Smith carry the Doctor inside to rest. When out shopping, Rose and Mickey are attacked by Santa robots; the Doctor theorises that energy from his regeneration has lured them there. Prime Minister Harriet Jones is threatened by the leader of the Sycorax to give them half of the Earth's population as slaves; Harriet tries to negotiate and is teleported onto their ship. The Sycorax detect the TARDIS and transport it to their ship, with Rose, Mickey, and the Doctor inside. After the Doctor has fully recovered, he challenges the Sycorax leader to a sword fight for the future of the Earth, which he eventually wins. However, the Sycorax ship is destroyed against the Doctor's wishes by Harriet Jones, who had called Torchwood on the matter.
Series
168	1	"New Earth"	James Hawes	Russell T Davies	15 April 2006	2.1	8.62	85
The Doctor and Rose travel to New Earth, the planet which humanity inhabited after the Earth's destruction by the Sun. (Note: As depicted in the 2005 episode "The End of the World") They go into a luxury hospital in New New York, where Rose meets the villain Cassandra again. Cassandra possesses Rose's body as she is in need of one. The Doctor and Cassandra discover that the hospital holds hundreds of artificially-grown humans that have been infected with diseases so the Sisters of Plenitude can find their cures. Cassandra releases several of the humans as a distraction, but they release others and a zombie-like attack begins. The Doctor sprays the infected humans with an intravenous solution using a disinfectant shower, curing them. The Doctor orders Cassandra out of Rose and she transfers her consciousness to her servant Chip, but his cloned body fails and Cassandra accepts her death.
169	2	"Tooth and Claw"	Euros Lyn	Russell T Davies	22 April 2006	2.2	9.24	83
The Doctor and Rose arrive in Scotland in 1879, where Queen Victoria invites them to the Torchwood Estate. Unknown to them, the estate has been captured by a group of monks who have brought a werewolf in hopes to infect Queen Victoria and establish an "Empire of the Wolf". The Doctor notices the trap and tries to shield himself, Victoria, and Rose from the werewolf. He learns that the estate was designed as a trap for the werewolf in part by Prince Albert as it contains a large telescope which, with Victoria's Koh-i-Noor diamond (cut down by Albert) and concentrated moonlight, can kill the werewolf. Though they save her, Queen Victoria is unnerved by the Doctor and Rose's modern eccentricities and founds the Torchwood Institute to defend Britain from further alien attacks.
170	3	"School Reunion"	James Hawes	Toby Whithouse	29 April 2006	2.3	8.31	85
The Doctor works undercover as a teacher in a school which Mickey believes is suspicious. Rose, working as a dinner lady, notices the cafeteria's chips have an adverse effect on other members of the kitchen staff, while the Doctor notes the chips seem to make the students more intelligent. The success of headmaster Mr Finch has aroused media attention; investigative journalist Sarah Jane Smith, the Doctor's former companion, arrives at the school and discovers the TARDIS. She and her robotic dog K9 join up with the Doctor, Rose, and Mickey. Together, they discover that the teachers are actually Krillitanes and the chips are coated with Krillitane oil, intended to make the children intelligent enough to decode the "Skasis Paradigm", (Note: The BBC iPlayer subtitles use the spelling Skasis, while the shooting script prefers Skasas.) a theory of everything, giving the Krillitanes full control of time and space. The Doctor refuses to join the Krillitanes and evacuates the children. K9 detonates the chip oil container, destroying the Krillitanes, the school, and K9 himself. Sarah Jane declines the Doctor's offer to travel with him, suggesting Mickey do so instead. Departing, the Doctor gives her a brand new model of K9.
171	4	"The Girl in the Fireplace"	Euros Lyn	Steven Moffat	6 May 2006	2.4	7.90	84
The Doctor, Rose, and Mickey arrive on an abandoned spaceship which contains several "time windows" into the life of Madame de Pompadour, known as "Reinette". The Doctor first enters her bedroom in Paris through an 18th-century fireplace when she is seven years old, and saves her from a clockwork man. On the ship, the Doctor and his companions discover more time windows into Reinette's life in 18th-century Versailles and see that the clockwork droids continue stalking her, but do not consider her "complete". The Doctor discovers that the droids murdered the ship's human crew and recycled some of their organs for use in the ship but still needs Reinette's brain to be fully functional. The brain must be 37 years old, the age of the ship; it is actually named after Madame de Pompadour. The Doctor arrives at some point after her 37th birthday, and saves her from the droids, who shut down because they have no way of returning to their ship. With Reinette safe, the Doctor uses the fireplace to travel to the spaceship. When he returns, he discovers that six years have passed, and Reinette has died. Downhearted, the Doctor and his companions depart in the TARDIS.
172a	5	"Rise of the Cybermen"	Graeme Harper	Tom MacRae	13 May 2006	2.5	9.22	86
A major problem with the TARDIS causes the Doctor, Rose, and Mickey to reach a parallel universe, with no way of getting back home for 24 hours. In the parallel universe, Rose's father Pete is still alive and most of humanity wears EarPods that feed information directly into the wearer's brain. The EarPods are designed by John Lumic, who is trying to give them an "upgrade" which will ultimately turn the humans into Cybermen. Though he has not received permission to do this, he has been abducting and converting numerous homeless people. Mickey is mistaken for his parallel universe self Ricky and is taken by Jake Simmonds, a member of a gang called the "Preachers" who are aware of the dangers of the EarPods. Cybermen begin attacking a birthday party at which the Doctor and Rose are posing as waiters. They, along with Pete, escape and run into Mickey and the Preachers, but the Cybermen close in on them.
172b	6	"The Age of Steel"	Graeme Harper	Tom MacRae	20 May 2006	2.6	7.63	86
Escaping from the Cybermen, the group go to Battersea Power Station, where Lumic uses a transmitter to control London's EarPod-wearing population and send them to be converted into Cybermen. On the way, Ricky is killed by the Cybermen. The group splits into three smaller groups to stop the conversion. Eventually, Mrs Moore is killed and the Doctor, Rose, and Pete are captured by the Cybermen and taken to Lumic, who has become the Cyber Controller. Mickey and Jake disable the transmitter on the zeppelin, freeing the humans who had not been converted. Mickey hacks Lumic's database to find the code to cancel every Cyberman's emotional inhibitor and sends it to Rose's phone; the Doctor plugs the phone into the computer systems which changes the signal and sends the Cybermen into despair. They escape the exploding factory on the zeppelin and Pete cuts the ladder Lumic is climbing up, sending him to his death. Mickey decides to stay and help fix the parallel universe with Jake and take care of Ricky's grandmother, as he understands Rose prefers the Doctor.
173	7	"The Idiot's Lantern"	Euros Lyn	Mark Gatiss	27 May 2006	2.7	6.76	84
The Doctor and Rose land in London in 1953 on the day before Queen Elizabeth II's coronation. The Doctor befriends teenager Tommy Connolly, whose grandmother is hidden because she lacks any facial features and has no brain activity, a phenomenon that is common with those who have purchased television sets sold cheap for the coronation from Magpie Electricals, owned by Mr Magpie. Rose, investigating the shop, finds that Mr Magpie is under the influence of an entity known as "the Wire", a fugitive who has converted herself to an electrical form and is using the televisions—and intends to use the upcoming coronation—to consume enough minds to rebuild its body; she takes Rose's face as well. In discovery of this, the Doctor is outraged and foils the Wire's plan with a device he creates, and those whose minds and faces were consumed are returned and London can safely watch the coronation.
174a	8	"The Impossible Planet"	James Strong	Matt Jones	3 June 2006	2.8	6.32	85
The Doctor and Rose arrive on a base on a planet which is impossibly orbiting a black hole. The crew of the base are there on an expedition to drill to the middle of the planet. A race of aliens known as the Ood serve them. A quake strikes the planet, causing several sections of the base, including the one where the TARDIS was, to fall into the planet. As the drill nears the planet's centre, the Ood begin foretelling the awakening of a "Beast", which possesses archaeologist Toby Zed and later the Ood. The drilling finishes, and the Doctor offers to go with Ida Scott to the depths of the planet, where they discover a disc with unreadable markings found on the base and the possessed Toby's face. The Doctor believes the disc to be a door, and as it begins to open the possessed Toby tells Rose that the planet has begun to fall into the black hole and the voice of the Beast announces that he is free.
174b	9	"The Satan Pit"	James Strong	Matt Jones	10 June 2006	2.9	6.08	86
Ida and the Doctor investigate the door and Rose and the other members of the crew witness a force leaving Toby's body and assume that he is no longer possessed. The Doctor descends into the dark pit and the Beast speaks to him, revealing he is the devil of "all" religions and has been sealed inside the planet, but is seeking to escape. The Doctor runs out of rope and believes he can survive the drop and falls, the news of which distresses Rose. Toby, Rose, Captain Zachary, and crew member Danny escape from the Ood and board and launch an escape rocket. The Doctor survives the crash and finds the physical form of the Beast. The Doctor realises his consciousness has managed to escape. Having faith in Rose, the Doctor triggers the sequence for the Beast and the planet to fall into the black hole, but as the Beast's consciousness is inside Toby the rocket begins to pull toward the black hole. Rose realises this and releases Toby from the rocket, and the Doctor finds the TARDIS in the pit and uses it to rescue Rose and Ida.
175	10	"Love & Monsters"	Dan Zeff	Russell T Davies	17 June 2006	2.10	6.66	76
Elton Pope, Ursula Blake, and three other people who have had encounters with the Doctor, form a group called LINDA in a library basement to discuss these encounters, but their meetings soon become more social. One day a man known as Victor Kennedy interrupts a meeting and reinvigorates LINDA's purpose to locate the Doctor. Later, two members of the group suddenly go missing. Elton, Ursula, and Mr Skinner attempt a walkout, but Kennedy convinces Mr Skinner to stay. Ursula returns to the library to retrieve her phone, where Kennedy reveals himself to be an Abzorbaloff, who has absorbed the missing LINDA members and Skinner. Ursula receives the same fate and the Abzorbaloff corners Elton, but the TARDIS appears and the Doctor confronts the Abzorbaloff. He discovers that the Abzorbaloff's cane is a field generator and Elton breaks it, destroying the creature.
176	11	"Fear Her"	Euros Lyn	Matthew Graham	24 June 2006	2.11	7.14	83
The Doctor and Rose arrive in a London neighbourhood just prior to the start of the 2012 Olympic Games. Children have been disappearing and the Doctor and Rose discover the source is a 12-year-old girl named Chloe Webber, who can cause people to disappear by drawing them. The Doctor finds that she is possessed by an Isolus, an alien life form that has crashed on Earth and can relate to Chloe's loneliness. For the Isolus to leave Chloe's body, they must find the Isolus's pod and give it power; Rose finds it under just-poured tar in the street and is able to power it by throwing it into the Olympic Torch as it comes by the street, giving the pod heat and emotional strength. As the missing children reappear, the demon-like drawing of Chloe's violent and dead father comes to life, but Chloe's mother calms Chloe's fears. The Isolus peacefully leaves Chloe's body.
177a	12	"Army of Ghosts"	Graeme Harper	Russell T Davies	1 July 2006	2.12	8.19	86
The Doctor and Rose visit Jackie and learn that for a few months the Earth has experienced silhouettes which appear at a certain time each day around the world. The public have accepted these as ghosts. However, the Doctor thinks they are the impressions of something forcing its way into the universe and tracks the source to the headquarters of a secret organisation known as Torchwood, hidden in Canary Wharf. Torchwood's director Yvonne Hartman reveals that the ghosts are a result of a breach in the universe created by a spherical "void ship", which is being studied at Torchwood. Three employees of Torchwood are manipulated to open the breach, which breaks down and causes millions of the ghosts to appear worldwide and shift into their true form: the Cybermen from the parallel universe. However, the Cybermen merely followed the void ship through the breach, and the ship is revealed to contain four Daleks.
177b	13	"Doomsday"	Graeme Harper	Russell T Davies	8 July 2006	2.13	8.22	89
The four Daleks, later identified as the Cult of Skaro, have brought a device known as the Genesis Ark through the breach and declare war on the Cybermen and the two races begin fighting worldwide. Meanwhile, the Doctor has discovered that Jake Simmonds, Pete Tyler, and Mickey—who masqueraded as a Torchwood employee and is with Rose and the Daleks—have been able to travel between the universes. The Cult of Skaro is keeping Rose and Mickey alive because they, being time travellers, would activate the Genesis Ark, which the Daleks are incapable of as it is stolen Time Lord technology. The Doctor plans to open the breach, which will pull in anyone who has crossed the Void including the Daleks, Cybermen, and Rose's family, and then close the breach. Rose refuses to reside in the parallel universe and stays to help the Doctor, but she is unable to hold on and becomes marooned in the parallel universe. The Doctor is able to transmit his image through one of the final breaches, and the two share a tearful goodbye before a mysterious woman in a wedding dress appears in the TARDIS. (Note: Credited as "the Bride" and unidentified on screen, this character is named Donna Noble in the following episode "The Runaway Bride".)

=== Supplemental episodes ===
Two mini-episodes were also recorded: "Doctor Who: Children in Need" was produced for the 2005 Children in Need appeal, and the interactive episode "Attack of the Graske" was recorded for digital television following the broadcast of "The Christmas Invasion".

No.	Title	Directed by	Written by	Original release date	Prod. code	UK viewers (millions)
1	"Born Again"	Euros Lyn	Russell T Davies	18 November 2005	CIN	10.8
Newly regenerated, the Doctor examines his new appearance and convinces Rose that he is the same man.
2	"Attack of the Graske"	Ashley Way	Gareth Roberts	25 December 2005	N/A	N/A
An interactive mini-episode debuting on the BBC Red Button service, in which the human race is in danger of being replaced by aliens.

=== Tardisodes ===
Thirteen Tardisodes, ranging from lengths of 40–55 seconds, were produced to serve as prequels to each episode. All episodes were filmed as part of the second series' production cycle.

No.	Title	Directed by	Written by	Original release date	Related episode
1	"New Earth"	Ashley Way	Gareth Roberts	1 April 2006	"New Earth"
In an advertisement on New Earth, a patient with terminal Autrey syndrome instantly regains her full health, before someone calls for help.
2	"Tooth and Claw"	Ashley Way	Gareth Roberts	15 April 2006	"Tooth and Claw"
An unidentified object falls from space 300 years before a crofter (Alan Dorrington) is attacked by a werewolf.
3	"School Reunion"	Ashley Way	Gareth Roberts	22 April 2006	"School Reunion"
After being halted by a Torchwood function, Mickey calls Rose to summon her and the Doctor to investigate lights in the sky and strange events at a school.
4	"The Girl in the Fireplace"	Ashley Way	Gareth Roberts	29 April 2006	"The Girl in the Fireplace"
Two pilots of an unidentified spaceship are caught in an ion storm. Something ticking approaches one of them as she screams.
5	"Rise of the Cybermen"	Ashley Way	Gareth Roberts	6 May 2006	"Rise of the Cybermen"
A mission briefing calls all agents into action, describing the disappearance of thousands at the hands of John Lumic, the head of Cybus Industries, and his latest "upgrade": the Cybermen.
6	"The Age of Steel"	Ashley Way	Gareth Roberts	13 May 2006	"The Age of Steel"
A video from John Lumic orders the "upgrade" of humans to Cybermen to commence around the world, and to delete incompatible versions.
7	"The Idiot's Lantern"	Ashley Way	Gareth Roberts	20 May 2006	"The Idiot's Lantern"
Grandma Connolly has her new television installed. She thinks it is malfunctioning before she is attacked by it. The station advertises the Queen's coronation.
8	"The Impossible Planet"	Ashley Way	Gareth Roberts	27 May 2006	"The Impossible Planet"
Captain Walker is informed about a black hole called "K37 Jem 5", which is orbited by a planet. He is given a book with ancient writings before a nearby Ood declares that the Beast shall rise from the pit.
9	"The Satan Pit"	Ashley Way	Gareth Roberts	3 June 2006	"The Satan Pit"
On sanctuary base, Captain Walker is dead and an Ood delivers his belongings to a man, who is marked by the Beast after Walker's book suddenly bursts into flames.
10	"Love & Monsters"	Ashley Way	Gareth Roberts	10 June 2006	"Love & Monsters"
A mysterious figure investigates an organisation called LINDA and the Doctor. He easily tracks their location before attacking his tea lady.
11	"Fear Her"	Ashley Way	Gareth Roberts	17 June 2006	"Fear Her"
An advertisement from Crime Crackers reports on the disappearances of two children, before a cabinet is opened containing a being with red eyes.
12	"Army of Ghosts"	Ashley Way	Gareth Roberts	24 June 2006	"Army of Ghosts"
A journalist tells his editor about the story of the century: Torchwood. His editor reports the journalist to Torchwood, after finding out the truth about "the Ghosts".
13	"Doomsday"	Ashley Way	Gareth Roberts	1 July 2006	"Doomsday"
As the Cybermen attack, a female news reporter informs the viewer that the country is in a state of emergency. She pleads anyone watching to run from them before the Daleks appear in her studio.

== Casting ==
=== Main characters ===
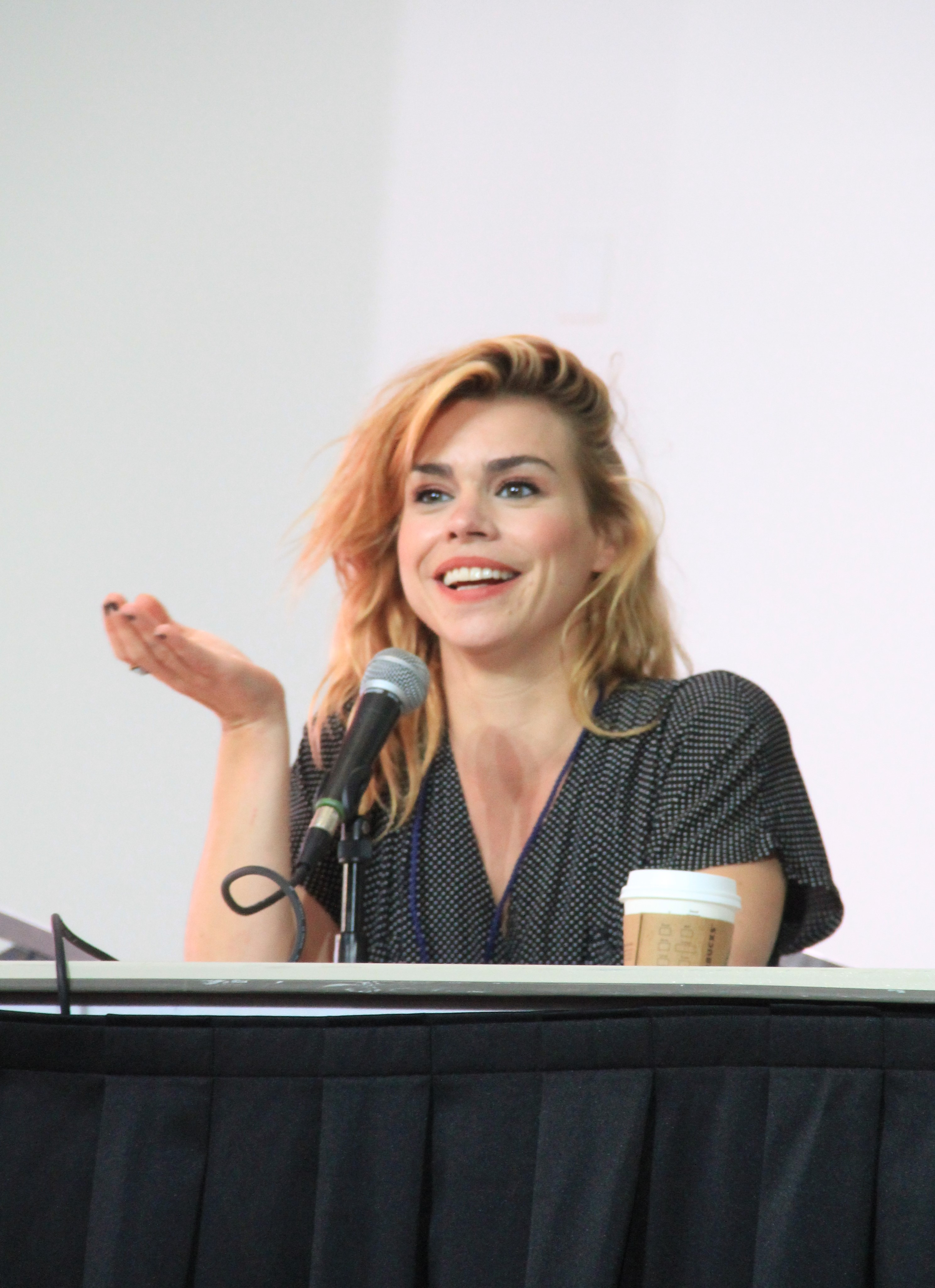
Piper returned as the Tenth Doctor's companion, having previously served as the Ninth Doctor's companion in the first series.

Series 2 was Tennant's first in the role of the Doctor; his casting was announced on 16 April 2005. Following his brief appearance in the closing moments of "The Parting of the Ways" he was next seen in the Children in Need special, broadcast on 18 November 2005. "The Christmas Invasion", broadcast one month later, marked his first episode. In 2005, Tennant had starred in Casanova, written by Russell T Davies and produced by Julie Gardner, when he was offered an audition as the Doctor, which surprised him as it had not yet been publicly announced that Christopher Eccleston would not be returning to the role. He was offered the role at Davies' home, and was initially concerned that if the series was not recommissioned he would become known as "the person who played the Doctor for 35 seconds".

Billie Piper continued her role as companion Rose Tyler, for her second and final series as a core protagonist. Piper departed as a regular following "Doomsday", but would return as a regular in the 2008 series and in a cameo in "The End of Time". She later explained that her decision was due to the unexpected success of the revival. Piper said that she "didn't like the responsibility of being a role model".

=== Guest stars ===
Camille Coduri continued to guest-star in the series as recurring character Jackie Tyler. Shaun Dingwall returned for several episodes as Pete Tyler and Penelope Wilton reprised her role as Harriet Jones for the Christmas special. Noel Clarke's character Mickey Smith, a recurring guest character during the first series, featured in several episodes as a companion of the Doctor. Zoë Wanamaker reprised her role as Cassandra from "The End of the World".

Elisabeth Sladen featured in the episode "School Reunion", returning to the character of Sarah Jane Smith, companion of the Third and Fourth Doctors. Following this episode, Sladen was asked to reprise her role in a spin-off series titled The Sarah Jane Adventures. John Leeson also featured in this episode as the voice of K9.

Other guest stars included Adam Garcia, Anita Briem, Sean Gilder, and Daniel Evans in "The Christmas Invasion"; Anna Hope and Adjoa Andoh in "New Earth"; Ian Hanmore in "Tooth and Claw"; Anthony Head in "School Reunion"; Sophia Myles and Ben Turner in "The Girl in the Fireplace; Roger Lloyd-Pack, Andrew Hayden-Smith, and Don Warrington in "Rise of the Cybermen" / "The Age of Steel", Rory Jennings, Jamie Foreman, Ron Cook, Margaret John, and Maureen Lipman in "The Idiot's Lantern", Claire Rushbrook, Danny Webb, Shaun Parkes, Silas Carson, and MyAnna Buring in "The Impossible Planet" / "The Satan Pit"; Marc Warren, Shirley Henderson, and Peter Kay in "Love & Monsters"; Nina Sosanya in "Fear Her"; and Tracy-Ann Oberman, Raji James and Barbara Windsor in "Army of Ghosts" / "Doomsday". Freema Agyeman, who appeared briefly in "Doomsday", would later return to co-star as Martha Jones in the following series. Andoh returned for Series 3 but was recast as Martha's mother. Pauline Collins, who appeared in "Tooth and Claw" as Queen Victoria, had previously appeared in The Faceless Ones (1967) as Samantha Briggs and Gabriel Woolf, who appeared as the voice of the Beast in "The Impossible Planet" / "The Satan Pit", had previously appeared in Pyramids of Mars (1975) as Suktekh, a role he would reprise 18 years following this appearance in the 2024 episodes "The Legend of Ruby Sunday" / "Empire of Death". Nicholas Hoult was considered for the role that went to Jennings.

== Production ==
=== Development ===
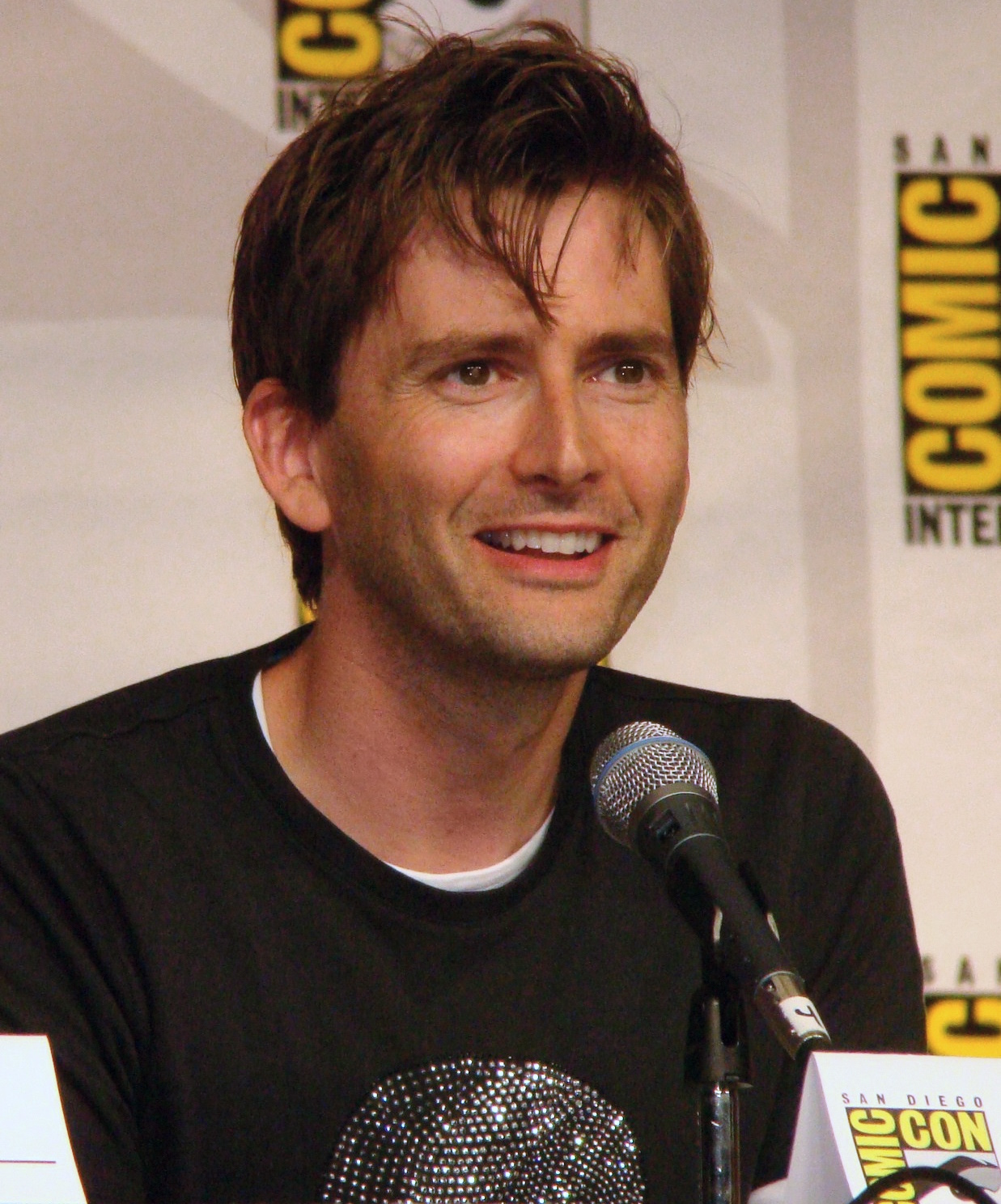
David Tennant replaced Christopher Eccleston who left after one series.

Following the success of the opening episode of the first series, the BBC announced that Doctor Who had been recommissioned for both a second series and a Christmas special on 30 March 2005. The series was the first series of Doctor Who to be preceded by a Christmas special. The success of the Christmas special led to it becoming an annual tradition. Production on the series began on 1 August 2005 and concluded on 31 March 2006. Phil Collinson produced all episodes, with Julie Gardner acting as executive producer.

=== Writing ===
Russell T Davies continued to act as head writer and executive producer, contributing several episodes of the series. New writers for the show included Toby Whithouse, Tom MacRae, Matt Jones, and Matthew Graham. Returning writers Mark Gatiss and Steven Moffat also contributed episodes to the series. Stephen Fry was due to write the eleventh episode, but was forced to withdraw as he could not complete the script in time. Davies consequently hired Graham, who he had been trying to hire for series three, to write "Fear Her". The villain of the episode "Love & Monsters", the Abzorbaloff, was designed by the winner of a Blue Peter contest.

"The Runaway Bride", which was supposed to be the midway point of the original line-up, was moved early on to be the Christmas special for the next series, and was replaced by "Tooth and Claw", which had its roots in a story about "Queen Victoria and a werewolf", something Davies had been contemplating since 2004. The order of the first few episodes moved around a bit while being written, and were only finalised after the early scripts were partially done, in order to find the best way to develop Tennant's Doctor, especially for those viewers confused by the regeneration.

The series is primarily set on Earth (though not as much as the first series was) due to the cost involved in creating another planet, Davies stated; only two stories were set on another planet. However, the team had learnt from the first series about the specific challenges faced by a sci-fi series; instead of last-minute changes to reduce CGI, plots were written in mind to use shots needing less CGI: gardens and concrete plazas, such as those employed in the then-recently released Battlestar Galactica show, which allowed an equitable budgetary distribution between stories. The second series came about quite differently from the first, not having to present every single detail to the BBC: discussions and plot changes happened as much in coffeehouses and on phone as it did in writing, and therefore the first outline had much more detail than the first series, allowing for a more connected series.

Just like the first series, the second series saw the return of another classic enemy, the Cybermen. Presented with the opportunity to re-introduce Cybermen to a whole new generation, Davies' prime objective for these Cybermen was to erase the word "silver" and to instead choose to stress the terms "metal" and "steel", emphasising the loss of their humanity as a source of their monstrosity.

The mythology of Torchwood is built across the series, though it did not feature in any of the early outlines or drafts for series 2 until its reveal in the finale even though it had first appeared in the 2005 episode "Bad Wolf". In "The Christmas Invasion", it is revealed to be a secret organisation which possesses alien technology, and its establishment is shown in "Tooth and Claw", whose late addition to the series allowed Davies to fix it in British history by associating it with Queen Victoria. References then gradually started appearing in the script of every episode: blocked websites, mentions of buildings and archives owned by Torchwood, and so on. Contemporary Torchwood is finally visited by the Doctor and Rose in "Army of Ghosts" / "Doomsday", at which point it is situated within London's Canary Wharf and allows the invasion of the Cybermen and, subsequently, the Daleks.

=== Filming ===
The series was directed by James Hawes, Euros Lyn, James Strong, Dan Zeff, and Graeme Harper. Harper had previously worked on the show's original run, which included directing The Caves of Androzani (1984) and Revelation of the Daleks (1985) in the show's original run.

Recording for the Christmas special began on 23 July 2005. The Clearwell Caves were used twice: the interior of the Sycorax ship, and the Beast's Pit in "The Satan Pit". Production blocks were scheduled around the directors. The majority of filming took place in Wales, particularly in Cardiff. Parts of "New Earth" were shot at the Wales Millennium Centre, which was used during promotion of the series. "Tooth and Claw" was originally part of block one, but production issues pushed it to block two. The episode was shot in Llansannor Court. The building was later reused for "The Unicorn and the Wasp". "The Girl in the Fireplace" used the Dyffryn Gardens for both the gardens and palace of Louis XV. The gardens were used for various other episodes, including "Deep Breath" and "The Wedding of River Song".

A Stella Artois brewery was used for the upgrading chamber in "Army of Ghosts". The Coedarhydyglyn House was used for Jackie and Pete's mansion in the episode. The house was later used in "The Angels Take Manhattan". Southerndown Beach was used for the beach where the Doctor and Rose say goodbye in "Doomsday". The beach was later reused in "Dinosaurs on a Spaceship". The first two weeks of filming on block four were spent entirely on "Fear Her". Maureen Lipman appeared in "The Idiot's Lantern", but due to scheduling conflicts, recorded her scenes remotely in London. Lipman finished her recording in under a day. Block six, the final block, contained only one episode, "Love & Monsters", which was directed by Zeff.

Production blocks were arranged as follows:

Block	Episode(s)	Director	Writer(s)	Producer(s)	Code
1	Christmas special: "The Christmas Invasion"	James Hawes	Russell T Davies	Phil Collinson	2X
1	Episode 3: "School Reunion"	James Hawes	Toby Whithouse	Phil Collinson	2.3
1	Episode 1: "New Earth"	James Hawes	Russell T Davies	Phil Collinson	2.1
2	Episode 2: "Tooth and Claw"	Euros Lyn	Russell T Davies	Phil Collinson	2.2
2	Episode 4: "The Girl in the Fireplace"	Euros Lyn	Steven Moffat	Phil Collinson	2.4
3	Episode 5: "Rise of the Cybermen"	Graeme Harper	Tom MacRae	Phil Collinson	2.5
3	Episode 6: "The Age of Steel"	Graeme Harper	Tom MacRae	Phil Collinson	2.6
3	Episode 12: "Army of Ghosts"	Graeme Harper	Russell T Davies	Phil Collinson	2.12
3	Episode 13: "Doomsday"	Graeme Harper	Russell T Davies	Phil Collinson	2.13
3	Minisode: "Attack of the Graske"	Ashley Way	Gareth Roberts	Jo Pearce, Sophie Fante & Andrew Whithouse	—N/a
3	Minisode: "Doctor Who: Children in Need"	Euros Lyn	Russell T Davies	Phil Collinson	CIN
4	Episode 11: "Fear Her"	Euros Lyn	Matthew Graham	Phil Collinson	2.11
4	Episode 7: "The Idiot's Lantern"	Euros Lyn	Mark Gatiss	Phil Collinson	2.7
5	Episode 8: "The Impossible Planet"	James Strong	Matt Jones	Phil Collinson	2.8
5	Episode 9: "The Satan Pit"	James Strong	Matt Jones	Phil Collinson	2.9
6	Episode 10: "Love & Monsters"	Dan Zeff	Russell T Davies	Phil Collinson	2.10

=== Soundtrack ===
Doctor Who: Original Television Soundtrack

Soundtrack album by Murray Gold
- Released: 4 December 2006
- Recorded: 2005–2006
- Genres: Soundtrack, incidental
- Length: 75:54
- Label: Silva Screen Records
- Producer: Murray Gold

Doctor Who soundtrack chronology
Devils' Planets – The Music of Tristram Cary (2003)	Original Television Soundtrack (2006)	Series 3 (2007)

Murray Gold returned to compose the music for the second series. Parts of the soundtrack were performed by the BBC National Orchestra of Wales and orchestrated by Ben Foster, unlike in the first series, which relied almost completely on orchestral samples. Selected pieces of score from the first series, second series, and "The Runaway Bride", as composed by Murray Gold, were released on 4 December 2006 by Silva Screen Records. The cues from the first series were re-recorded by the BBC National Orchestra of Wales, the original music having been created using orchestral samples.

Gold's arrangement of the main theme featured samples from the 1963 original with further elements added: an orchestral sound of low horns, strings and percussion and part of the Dalek ray-gun and TARDIS materialisation sound effects. Included on the album are two versions of the theme: the 44-second opening version, as arranged by Gold, and a longer arrangement that includes the "middle eight" (a name given to one of the sections of the melody), after Gold omitted it from both the opening and closing credits. Gold has said that his interpretation was driven by the title visual sequence he was given to work around. Often erroneously cited as being the same as the end credits version, this second version is in fact a new arrangement and recording.

No.	Title	Episode	Length
1.	"Doctor Who Theme (TV version)"	Various	0:40
2.	"Westminster Bridge"	"Rose", "The Christmas Invasion"	2:10
3.	"Bad Wolf"	"The Parting of the Ways"	1:20
4.	"Cassandra's Waltz"	"The End of the World", "New Earth"	3:10
5.	"Slitheen"	"Aliens of London" / "World War Three", "Boom Town", "Love & Monsters"	1:24
6.	"Father's Day"	"Father's Day"	1:57
7.	"Rose in Peril"	"Bad Wolf" / "The Parting of the Ways"	1:41
8.	"Boom Town Suite"	"Boom Town"	3:04
9.	"I'm Coming to Get You"	"Bad Wolf"	1:14
10.	"Hologram"	"The Parting of the Ways"	2:17
11.	"Rose Defeats the Daleks"	"The Parting of the Ways"	2:33
12.	"Clockwork TARDIS"	"The End of the World"	1:20
13.	"Harriet Jones, Prime Minister"	"World War Three", "The Christmas Invasion"	2:15
14.	"Rose's Theme"	"The End of the World"	2:16
15.	"Song for Ten (performed by Neil Hannon)"	"The Christmas Invasion"	3:29
16.	"The Face of Boe"	"New Earth"	1:18
17.	"UNIT"	"The Christmas Invasion"	1:46
18.	"Seeking The Doctor"	"Rose", "Love & Monsters"	0:43
19.	"Madame de Pompadour"	"The Girl in the Fireplace"	3:46
20.	"Tooth and Claw"	"Tooth and Claw"	3:52
21.	"The Lone Dalek"	"Dalek", "The Satan Pit", "Doomsday"	5:01
22.	"New Adventures"	"Boom Town", "The Parting of the Ways", "The Christmas Invasion"	2:21
23.	"Finding Jackie"	"The Parting of the Ways", "Love & Monsters"	0:54
24.	"Monster Bossa"	"Boom Town", "Love & Monsters"	1:39
25.	"The Daleks"	"Bad Wolf"	3:03
26.	"The Cybermen"	"Rise of the Cybermen" / "The Age of Steel"	4:34
27.	"Doomsday"	"Doomsday"	5:11
28.	"The Impossible Planet"	"The Impossible Planet"	3:13
29.	"Sycorax Encounter"	"The Christmas Invasion"	1:13
30.	"Love Don't Roam (performed by Neil Hannon)"	"The Runaway Bride"	3:59
31.	"Doctor Who Theme (album version)"		2:31
Total length:			75:54

== Release ==
=== Broadcast ===
The second series premiered on 15 April 2006 with "New Earth", and concluded after thirteen episodes on 8 July 2006 with "Doomsday". Doctor Who Confidential also aired alongside each episode of the series, continuing on from the previous series.

A Children in Need special and an interactive episode, entitled "Attack of the Graske", were both released alongside the series. A series of thirteen Tardisodes were also produced. These mini-episodes (approximately 60 seconds in length) served as prequels to each forthcoming episode, and were available for download to mobile phones and viewable at the official Doctor Who website. The Tardisodes were recorded intermittently from 31 January to 8 April 2006.

Downloads of the Tardisodes to mobile telephones were less popular than expected: around 40,000 downloads, averaging 3,000 per episode. Downloads to personal computers were much more common, with 2.6 million downloads. Iain Tweedale, new media editor for BBC Wales, suggested two reasons for the low number of telephone downloads: although the BBC provided the episodes free, most users had to pay a fee to their mobile network, and many telephones were not compatible with the broadcasts.

In the United States, the second series aired on The Sci Fi Channel (now known as SyFy). In Canada, the series aired through the Canadian Broadcasting Corporation. The corporation won a Constellation Award for their assistance and contributions to the series. In France, the series aired on France 4.

=== Promotion ===
The press launch for the series began on 27 March at the Wales Millennium Centre. A special trailer for the series was produced by Red Bee Media. The trailer included both clips from the series and special footage shot for it. Various episodes received screening prior to their official release, including a Glasgow-based screening for "Tooth and Claw" and a Cardiff-based one for "The Christmas Invasion".

The promotion of the second series also took other forms: interviews with cast and crew on channels like BBC1 and ITV1; rumours and reports and the occasional interview in tabloids and newspapers such as The Independent, The Sun, The Daily Mirror, The Sunday Herald, and so on; and discussions about the series, sometimes with the crew, on Radio 1, Virgin Radio, Radio 4, and Radio Wales.

The BBC promoted the series using their various holdings: CBBC used the theme with the broadcast of their programme, fictional websites, such as those of Mickey and UNIT, were updated before the associated episodes, the real website saw the release of mini-episodes of 2–3 minutes, called Tardisodes, as prologues for every episode, along with the rare banner using in-universe references to ask viewers to check out the current episode.

The major promoter for the series, aside from the BBC, was Radio Times: they released their first programme-specific Christmas double issue in 16 years, instead of the usual generic issue, for the release of "The Christmas Invasion", a special section called "Doctor Who Watch", and covers and interviews with cast and crew throughout the run of the series.

=== Home media ===
The second series of Doctor Who was first released on DVD in five volumes, with the first volume being released in Region 2 on 1 May 2006 and the final volume on 25 September 2006. The five volumes were also released in Region 4, invariably two months after the Region 2 release. The entire series was subsequently released in a boxset on 20 November 2006 in Region 2. All releases are for DVD unless otherwise indicated:

- ^{(D)} indicates a DVD release for a specific date
- ^{(B)} indicates a Blu-ray release

Series	Story no.	Episode name	Duration	Release date		
Series	Story no.	Episode name	Duration	R2	R4	R1
2	167–168	Doctor Who: Series 2, Volume 1 "The Christmas Invasion" & "New Earth"	1 × 60 min. 1 × 45 min.	1 May 2006	20 July 2006	—N/a
2	169–171	Doctor Who: Series 2, Volume 2 "Tooth and Claw" – "The Girl in the Fireplace"	3 × 45 min.	5 June 2006	17 August 2006	—N/a
2	172–173	Doctor Who: Series 2, Volume 3 "Rise of the Cybermen" – "The Idiot's Lantern"	3 × 45 min.	10 July 2006	7 September 2006	—N/a
2	174–175	Doctor Who: Series 2, Volume 4 "The Impossible Planet" – "Love & Monsters"	3 × 45 min.	7 August 2006	5 October 2006	—N/a
2	176–177	Doctor Who: Series 2, Volume 5 "Fear Her" – "Doomsday"	3 × 45 min.	25 September 2006	2 November 2006	—N/a
2	167–177	Doctor Who: The Complete Second Series (includes "The Christmas Invasion" and "Children in Need")	1 × 7 min. 1 × 60 min. 13 × 45 min.	20 November 2006 ^{(D)} 4 November 2013 ^{(B)} (Note: Part of The Complete Series 1–7); 31 August 2015 ^{(B)}	6 December 2006 ^{(D)} 4 December 2013 ^{(B)}	16 January 2007 (Note: 6 February 2007 in Canada) ^{(D)} 5 November 2013 ^{(B)}
2	167–172	Doctor Who: Series 2, Part 1 "The Christmas Invasion" – "The Age of Steel"	1 × 60 min. 6 × 45 min.	—N/a	—N/a	8 April 2014
2	173–177	Doctor Who: Series 2, Part 2 "The Idiot's Lantern" – "Doomsday"	7 × 45 min.	—N/a	—N/a	13 May 2014
2, 3, 4,2008–10 specials	167–202	Doctor Who: The Complete David Tennant Years	5 × 6 min. 2 × 7 min. 1 × 8 min. 1 × 12 min. 35 × 45 min. 4 × 50 min. 6 × 60 min. 1 × 65 min. 1 × 72 min. 1 × 75 min.	10 November 2014	—N/a	11 October 2011^{(D)} 17 September 2019^{(B)}

=== In print ===
"The Christmas Invasion" was adapted into a novel by Jenny Colgan. The novel was subsequently produced as an audio book, narrated by Camille Coduri.

Series	Story no.	Novelisation title	Author	Original publisher	Paperback release date	Audiobook	
Series	Story no.	Novelisation title	Author	Original publisher	Paperback release date	Release date (Note: Unabridged from BBC Audio / AudioGo unless otherwise indicated)	Narrator
2	167	The Christmas Invasion (Note: Also adapts "Doctor Who: Children in Need")	Jenny T. Colgan	BBC Books (Target collection)	5 April 2018		Camille Coduri
2	174	The Satan Pit (Note: Also adapts "The Impossible Planet")	Matt Jones	BBC Books (Target collection)	26 March 2026		Claire Rushbrook; Ronny Jhutti; Silas Carson; Maureen O'Brien

== Reception ==
=== Ratings ===
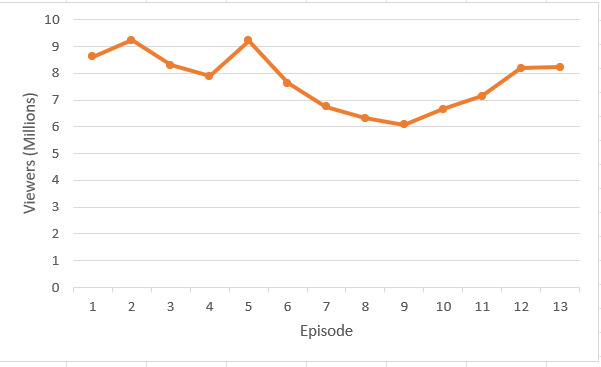
Ratings for the second series

The second series of Doctor Who was watched by an average of 7.5 million viewers, which was slightly down from the previous series, which was watched by 7.9 million viewers. Doctor Who's first Christmas special, "The Christmas Invasion", was watched by 9.84 million viewers upon its premiere on 25 December 2005, and, as of 2010, was the ninth-highest figure for an episode of Doctor Who since its 2005 revival. The series' finale, "Doomsday", was watched by 8.2 million total viewers, beating a World Cup match between Portugal and Germany by over a million viewers. The series high was "Tooth and Claw" with 9.24 million viewers, while the series low was "The Satan Pit" with 6.08 million viewers.

The series finale, "Doomsday", garnered the highest Appreciation Index (AI) rating of 89, while the tenth episode in the series, "Love & Monsters", garnered the lowest AI rating, at 76, seven units lower than the second-lowest AI rating. The US release of the series averaged a household rating of 1.05 million viewers.

=== Critical reception ===
Doctor Who's second series received critical acclaim. Series 2 holds a 100% approval rating on Rotten Tomatoes with an average score of 9/10, based on eight critic reviews. Many considered the finale "Doomsday" one of the best episodes and "Fear Her" one of the worst, with one reviewer calling the series full of intense highs for both the characters and the plot. Critics praised Tennant's and Piper's performances and romantic tension. The series' CGI, the Torchwood reveal, and use of cliffhangers also received praise, as did Murray Gold's soundtrack, the series' dynamic nature, and the varying settings.

Reviewing the two-part finale, Slant Magazine's Ross Ruediger and The A.V. Club's Alasdair Wilkins both found the first part intense, with "a great cliffhanger", with Wilkins additionally stating it was not afraid of dealing with "some large thematic questions". However, Ruediger characterised the second part as being "full of fanboy silliness", and Wilkins criticised it for how fast the situation changes with the arrival of the foes, a direct result of human interference, stating the show seems "incapable of placing the Doctor in a morally ambiguous situation". Though finding the episode "dramatic" and "soulful", they both concluded that, for a Doctor Who story, humans are mere supporting characters, with a narrative that Wilkins found "requires the Doctor to be the hero". However, they both still found the finale enjoyable: Wilkins calling it "supremely entertaining television", and Ruediger stating "it makes no attempts to play by any rules other than its own" and provides a "gut-wrenching farewell" for Rose.

The finale was characterised by IGN's Ahsan Haque as "an intense epic" still being "led by character-driven drama", and by Radio Times's Mark Braxton as a story where the strength of the show's two biggest foes combined is contrasted with "a poignant story about loss". In addition, IGN's Haque, while finding "the denouement to be the clear emotional highlight", also found the dialogue "funny and witty" and adding to "the memorability of the finale". Together with "the great writing and beautiful acting", he called it more entertaining than entire seasons of many shows and "sci-fi television at its finest". Similarly, Radio Times's Braxton praised the show for finding "ways to think big" since its revival while also sometimes delivering on this scale "with such devastating intimacy".

Screen Rant's Edward Cleary ranked the series sixth of thirteen, and felt the chemistry between Tennant and Piper overshadowed any problems; he described "The Impossible Planet" / "The Satan Pit" as one of the "best two-parters ever". In 2021, Comic Book Resources's Gabriela Delgado noted the series was the second-highest rated on IMDb of Doctor Who's modern run, behind only the fourth. Delgado praised "Doomsday" as "heartwrenching" and "tragic". Digital Spy's Morgan Jeffery and Rebecca Cook ranked the series fourth, praising Tennant's performance; they believed the series brought new levels of success by increasing the show's popularity and securing its future. Den of Geek's Andrew Blair placed the series nineteenth overall, the lowest of Tennant's run, and believed it was a "comedown" in quality from its predecessor.

=== Awards and nominations ===
Year	Award	Category	Nominee(s)	Result	Ref(s)
2006	BAFTA Cymru Awards	Best Actor	David Tennant for "Doomsday"	Won	
2006	BAFTA Cymru Awards	Best Screenplay	Russell T Davies for "Doomsday"	Won	
2006	BAFTA Cymru Awards	Best Actress	Billie Piper for "Doomsday"	Nominated	
2006	BAFTA Cymru Awards	Best Costume	Louise Page	Won	
2006	BAFTA Cymru Awards	Best Make-up	Neill Gorton and Sheelagh Wells for "The Girl in the Fireplace"	Won	
2006	BAFTA Cymru Awards	Best Editor	Crispin Green for "Tooth and Claw"	Won	
2006	Nebula Awards	Nebula Award for Best Script	Steven Moffat for "The Girl in the Fireplace"	Nominated	
2006	Royal Television Society Programme Awards	Best Drama Series	Doctor Who	Nominated	
2006	Royal Television Society Programme Awards	Best Production Design	Edward Thomas	Nominated	
2006	Royal Television Society Programme Awards	Best Costume Design – Drama	Louise Page	Nominated	
2006	Royal Television Society Programme Awards	Best Make Up Design – Drama	Neill Gorton and Sheelagh Wells	Nominated	
2006	Royal Television Society Programme Awards	Best Visual Effects – Digital Effects	Doctor Who	Nominated	
2006	Scream Award	Best TV Show	Doctor Who	Nominated	
2006	TV Quick	Best Loved Drama	Doctor Who	Won	
2006	TV Quick	Best Actor	David Tennant	Won	
2006	TV Quick	Best Actress	Billie Piper	Won	
2007	British Academy Television Awards	Best Editing Fiction/Entertainment	Crispin Green	Nominated	
2007	British Academy Television Awards	Best Visual Effects	The Mill	Nominated	
2007	Constellation Awards	Best Science Fiction Television Series	Doctor Who	Won	
2007	Constellation Awards	Best Male Performance in a 2006 Science Fiction Television Episode	David Tennant for "The Girl in the Fireplace"	Won	
2007	Constellation Awards	Outstanding Canadian Contribution to Science Fiction Film or Television in 2006	Canadian Broadcasting Corporation	Won	
2007	Hugo Awards	Hugo Award for Best Dramatic Presentation	"The Girl in the Fireplace"	Won	
2007	Hugo Awards	Hugo Award for Best Dramatic Presentation	"School Reunion"	Nominated	
2007	Hugo Awards	Hugo Award for Best Dramatic Presentation	"Army of Ghosts" / "Doomsday	Nominated	
2007	National Television Awards	Most Popular Drama	Doctor Who	Won	
2007	National Television Awards	Most Popular Actor	David Tennant	Won	
2007	National Television Awards	Most Popular Actress	Billie Piper	Won	
2007	Saturn Awards	Best Syndicated/Cable Television Series	Doctor Who	Nominated	
2007	Saturn Awards	Best Television DVD Release	Doctor Who	Nominated	
2007	Visual Effects Society Awards	Outstanding Performance by an Animated Character in a Live Action Broadcast Program, Commercial, or Music Video	Nicholas Hernandez, Jean-Claude Deguara, Neil Roche and Jean-Yves Audouard for "Tooth and Claw"	Nominated	
