= Paul Kasey =

English actor (b. 1973)

- Born: Chatham, Kent, England
- Years active: 2002–present

Paul Kasey is an English actor who frequently plays monsters on Doctor Who, The Sarah Jane Adventures and Torchwood.

Kasey was born in Chatham, Kent. He has played the Cybercontroller, the Cyber Leader, Cybermen, a clockwork android, the Hoix, an Auton, a Slitheen, an Ood, the Anne-Droid and a member of the Forest of Cheem in Doctor Who, and Janet the Weevil, Alien Blowfish and a Hoix in Torchwood.

He has also made many appearances in The Sarah Jane Adventures as aliens, and frequent appearances as himself on Totally Doctor Who, usually in costume. Kasey has also appeared as a zombie in 28 Days Later and has appeared in the Star Wars film series as Ello Asty in The Force Awakens, Admiral Raddus and Edrio Two Tubes in Rogue One, and C'ai Threnalli in The Last Jedi.

== Filmography ==
=== Doctor Who ===
Role	Episodes
Auton	"Rose" (2005)
Coffa of Forest of Cheem	"The End of the World" (2005)
Slitheen	"Aliens of London" / "World War Three" (2005)
Zu-Zana	"Bad Wolf" (2005)
Santa Roboform	"The Christmas Invasion" (2005); "The Runaway Bride" (2006)
Clockwork Droid	"The Girl in the Fireplace" (2006)
Cyberman	"Rise of the Cybermen" / "The Age of Steel" (Tardisode 6) (2006); "Closing Time" (2011)
Cyber Controller	"The Age of Steel" (2006)
Ood	"The Impossible Planet" / "The Satan Pit" (2006); "Death Is the Only Answer" (2011); Pond Life (2012)
Hoix	"Love & Monsters" (2006)
Cyber Leader	"Army of Ghosts" / "Doomsday" (2006); "The Next Doctor" (2008)
Judoon Captain	"Smith and Jones" (2007); "The Stolen Earth" (2008); "The Pandorica Opens" (2010); "Fugitive of the Judoon" (2020); "The Timeless Children" (2020)
Pig Slave	"Daleks in Manhattan" / "Evolution of the Daleks" (2007)
Heavenly Host	"Voyage of the Damned" (2007)
Ood Sigma	"Planet of the Ood" (2008); "The Waters of Mars" (2009); "The End of Time" (2009–10); "A Good Man Goes to War" (2011) (deleted scene)
Hath Peck	"The Doctor's Daughter" (2008)
Tritovore Sorvin	"Planet of the Dead" (2009)
Ood Nephew	"The Doctor's Wife" (2011)
Wooden Queen	"The Doctor, the Widow and the Wardrobe" (2011)
Time Zombie	"Journey to the Centre of the TARDIS" (2013)
Whisper Man	"The Name of the Doctor" ("Clarence and the Whisphermen") (2013)
Zygon	"The Day of the Doctor" (2013)
Footman	"Deep Breath" (2014)
Harold Green	"Nikola Tesla's Night of Terror" (2020)
It Has No Name	"The Well" (2025)

=== Torchwood ===
Role	Episodes
Weevil	"Everything Changes" (2006); "Day One" (2006); "Greeks Bearing Gifts" (2006); "Combat" (2006); "Dead Man Walking" (2008); "A Day in the Death" (2008); "Fragments" (2008); "Exit Wounds" (2008)
Blowfish	"Kiss Kiss, Bang Bang" (2008); "Fragments" (2008)
Hoix	"Exit Wounds" (2008)

=== The Sarah Jane Adventures ===
Role	Serials
Slitheen	Revenge of the Slitheen (2007); The Lost Boy (2007); The Nightmare Man (2010)
General Kudlak, The Mistress, Uvodni Emperor	Warriors of Kudlak (2007)
Judoon Captain Tybo	Prisoner of the Judoon (2009)
Dark Rider	Mona Lisa's Revenge (2009)
Blathereen	The Gift (2009)
Shansheeth	Death of the Doctor (2010)
Red Robot	The Empty Planet (2010)
Metalkind	Sky (2011)

=== Other ===
Year	Title	Role	Notes
2002	Blade II	Blood Bank Guard / Reaper	
2002	28 Days Later	Infected	
2006	Doctor Who: A Celebration	Cyberman; Ood	Live performance; later broadcast
2007	1408	Kevin O'Malley	
2008, 2010, 2013	Doctor Who at the Proms	Judoon Captain	Live performances; later broadcast
2008	Inkheart	Minotaur	
2009	Scoop	Bigfoot	1 episode
2009–12	Being Human	George Werewolf	9 episodes
2015	Star Wars: The Force Awakens	Ello Asty	Uncredited
2016	Rogue One	Admiral Raddus	
2017	Star Wars: The Last Jedi	C'ai Threnalli	
2019	Star Wars: The Rise of Skywalker	C'ai Threnalli	
