= School Reunion (Doctor Who) =

170 – "School Reunion"
- Doctor Who episode

Cast
- Doctor: David Tennant – Tenth Doctor
- Companions: Billie Piper – Rose Tyler; Noel Clarke – Mickey Smith
- Others: Anthony Head – Mr Finch; Elisabeth Sladen – Sarah Jane Smith; Rod Arthur – Mr Parsons; Eugene Washington – Mr Wagner; Heather Cameron – Nina; Joe Pickley – Kenny; Benjamin Smith – Luke; Clem Tibber – Milo; Lucinda Dryzek – Melissa; Caroline Berry – Dinner Lady; John Leeson – Voice of K9

Production
- Directed by: James Hawes
- Written by: Toby Whithouse
- Produced by: Phil Collinson
- Executive producers: Russell T Davies; Julie Gardner
- Music by: Murray Gold
- Production code: 2.3
- Series: Series 2
- Running time: 45 minutes
- First broadcast: 29 April 2006

Chronology
← Preceded by "Tooth and Claw"	Followed by → "The Girl in the Fireplace"

"School Reunion" is the third episode in the second series of the British science fiction television series Doctor Who. It first aired on BBC One on 29 April 2006.

The episode's narrative takes place in England some time after the events of the 2005 episode "The Christmas Invasion", and involves the Tenth Doctor (David Tennant) reuniting with his former travelling companion Sarah Jane Smith (Elisabeth Sladen), whom the Fourth Doctor left behind in the 1976 serial The Hand of Fear. In the episode, the alien race the Krillitanes, disguising themselves as school faculty, use the minds of children to solve a theory of everything that would allow them to control time and space.

The use of the Doctor's previous companions, in particular Sarah Jane and K9 (John Leeson), was first proposed in 2003 to the BBC. After the episode was produced, Elisabeth Sladen was approached by the BBC to star in a spin-off, The Sarah Jane Adventures, which also included K9 in several stories. The episode was positively reviewed, with an Appreciation Index of 85 ("Excellent").

== Plot ==
Mr Finch, the new headmaster of Deffry Vale School, has been changing the school to improve the students' performance; his changes include free lunches with special chips, a new curriculum, and replacing half of the teachers under mysterious circumstances. The Tenth Doctor takes an undercover job as a science teacher at the school, while Rose works in the school's cafeteria. The former discovers that an oil in the chips has caused some students to become ultraintelligent. Rose also observes that the oil has an adverse effect on the other kitchen staff, who must use hazmat suits to handle it.

Mr Finch's successes gain the attention of investigative journalist Sarah Jane Smith, a former companion of the Doctor. She meets the Doctor, Rose, and Mickey, with an immediate rivalry sparking between the two women. Sarah Jane shows them the robot dog K9 in the boot of her car, who identifies the chip oil as Krillitane in origin. Rose, previously unaware that the Doctor even had past companions, questions why he had left Sarah Jane behind and never mentioned her.

The following day, the group returns to the school to investigate further. The Doctor confronts Mr Finch, who reveals that he and other staff members are Krillitanes, a "composite species" that takes desirable attributes of the species they conquer. He attempts to subvert the Doctor, without success. Mickey and K9 remain in Sarah Jane's car for surveillance. With the Doctor's help, Sarah Jane and Rose discover that the school computers (bolstered by the students' ultraintelligence) are part of a Krillitane effort to solve the "Skasis Paradigm", (Note: The BBC iPlayer subtitles use the spelling Skasis, while the shooting script prefers Skasas.) a theory of everything. Mr Finch propositions the Doctor a second time, but the Doctor again refuses. After Kenny (a student who was unable to eat the chips) alerts Mickey to the students' plight, Mickey crashes Sarah Jane's car through the school's doors and unplugs the computers, allowing the children to flee. The Doctor leads the Krillitanes to the kitchen. Upon their arrival, K9 detonates the chip oil container, saturating the Krillitanes and blowing them up along with K9.

Sarah Jane declines a second chance of travelling in the TARDIS, deciding to move on with her life. Mickey decides to join the Doctor. Getting on better with Rose than at their first meeting, Sarah Jane asks her to stay with the Doctor and is given a new K9 as a parting gift.

== Production ==
The concept of Sarah Jane and K9 returning to Doctor Who was an idea of Russell T Davies from pitching the show in 2003. Such a use would show what would happen after a companion left the Doctor, without dwelling too much on the classic series. It was Davies' full intention for Sarah Jane to be used for this, and while Sladen originally declined a request, thinking her role would not be important, she changed her mind when she realised she would be the focal point of the adventure. After production of the episode was finished, Sladen was approached about a full spin-off series, The Sarah Jane Adventures, which was formally announced on 14 September 2006.

The episode went through several changes in production: working titles included "Old Friends" and "Black Ops", the latter being set in an army base. Davies requested that Whithouse set it in a school instead, mainly for simplicity, but also for a desire for the Doctor to masquerade as a school teacher. Additionally, the Krillitanes were to be named "Krillians" until the BBC found the name was trademarked, and Finch's forename was originally Hector, until the BBC found a real teacher by the same name, and renamed him Lucas. A scene that was cut was of Milo's brain being "shorted out" by the Doctor's rapid-fire questions causing him to collapse at the beginning of the episode, which was later alluded to in the episode.

The episode, originally in the second production block, was produced in the first block along with "The Christmas Invasion" and "New Earth". Two high schools in Wales were used for filming: Fitzalan High School in Leckwith was used on 23 August and 24 August 2005, for filming the first conversation between the Doctor and Finch, and for the playground, kitchen, and cafeteria scenes, and Duffryn High School in Newport, which was used between 25 August and 6 September for the remainder of the episode, with filming delayed due to asbestos being discovered in Duffryn High School's structure. The scenes in the schools utilised dozens of children as extras. Pick-up shots were later completed on 7 September and 8 September, with filming of the cafe scene delayed due to drunk and disorderly conduct from members of the public.

== Broadcast and reception ==
The episode was watched by 8.3 million viewers, the twelfth most-watched programme of the week, with an Appreciation Index score of 85%. Jacob Clifton of Television Without Pity gave the episode an A+ rating. Ahsan Haque of IGN gave the episode an 8.7 out of 10 ("Great") and commented that the episode had "fantastic character moments" and "brilliant CGI effects", and that "if you're willing to accept the Scooby-Doo storyline, then the strong nostalgic vibes present in this episode should be enough to carry this episode into a must-see category", and K9 and Sarah Jane alone made the episode worth watching for fans of the classic series. The episode was subsequently nominated for the 2007 Hugo Award for Best Dramatic Presentation, Short Form, an award that was won by the following episode "The Girl in the Fireplace".
