= The Age of Steel =

Episode of Doctor Who

172b – "The Age of Steel"
- Doctor Who episode

Cast
- Doctor: David Tennant – Tenth Doctor
- Companions: Billie Piper – Rose Tyler; Noel Clarke – Mickey Smith
- Others: Camille Coduri – Jackie Tyler; Shaun Dingwall – Pete Tyler; Roger Lloyd-Pack – John Lumic; Andrew Hayden-Smith – Jake Simmonds; Helen Griffin – Mrs Moore; Colin Spaull – Mr Crane; Duncan Duff – Newsreader; Paul Kasey – Cyber-Leader; Nicholas Briggs – Cyber-Voice

Production
- Directed by: Graeme Harper
- Written by: Tom MacRae
- Produced by: Phil Collinson
- Executive producers: Russell T Davies; Julie Gardner
- Music by: Murray Gold
- Production code: 2.6
- Series: Series 2
- Running time: 2nd of 2-part story, 45 minutes
- First broadcast: 20 May 2006

Chronology
← Preceded by "Rise of the Cybermen"	Followed by → "The Idiot's Lantern"

"The Age of Steel" is the sixth episode of the second series of the British science fiction television programme Doctor Who. It was first broadcast on BBC One on 20 May 2006 and is the second part of a two-part story. The first part, "Rise of the Cybermen", was broadcast on 13 May.

The episode is set in London in a parallel universe. In the episode, the businessman John Lumic (Roger Lloyd-Pack) has overthrown Great Britain's government and taken over London. A human resistance movement seeks to stop Lumic's plan to convert humanity into Cybermen by destroying Lumic's transmitter controlling London's population.

== Plot ==
=== Synopsis ===
The Tenth Doctor incinerates the Cybermen surrounding himself, Rose, Mickey, and the Preachers by using the recharging power cell from the TARDIS. The group escapes with Pete. As they flee, Pete explains to the Preachers that he is "Gemini", the Preachers' secret source of information on John Lumic. From his hovering zeppelin, moored near the Cyberman factory at Battersea Power Station, Lumic activates the EarPod devices and uses them to control the people of London, including Pete's wife Jackie, and bring them in to be upgraded.

Ricky is killed by the Cybermen while trying to scale a fence to meet Mickey. Mickey and Jake decide to board Lumic's zeppelin to destroy the EarPod transmitter on board, Pete and Rose try to find Jackie inside the factory, and the Doctor and Mrs Moore try to find their way to Lumic. Pete and Rose are captured by the Cybermen and taken to Lumic when a now-upgraded Jackie catches sight of them. The Doctor and Mrs Moore discover every Cyberman contains an emotional inhibitor. He deduces that if he disables the signal from the inhibitors, the realisation of what they have become will cause the Cybermen to commit suicide. Mrs Moore is killed by a Cyberman, and the Doctor is taken to Lumic, now upgraded as the Cyber Controller.

Mickey and Jake successfully disable the transmitter, causing the humans to flee the factory. The Doctor subtly tells Mickey over a surveillance camera to find the inhibitor code in the Lumic family's database. He finds it and sends it to Rose's phone. The Doctor plugs the phone into the computer systems, causing the inhibitor signal to drop and sending the army of Cybermen into despair. The Cybermen explode, setting the factory on fire, and Rose, the Doctor and Pete escape to the roof, where Mickey and Jake have control of the zeppelin. The enraged Cyber Controller attempts to follow, but Pete causes him to fall by destroying part of the ladder using the Doctor's sonic screwdriver.

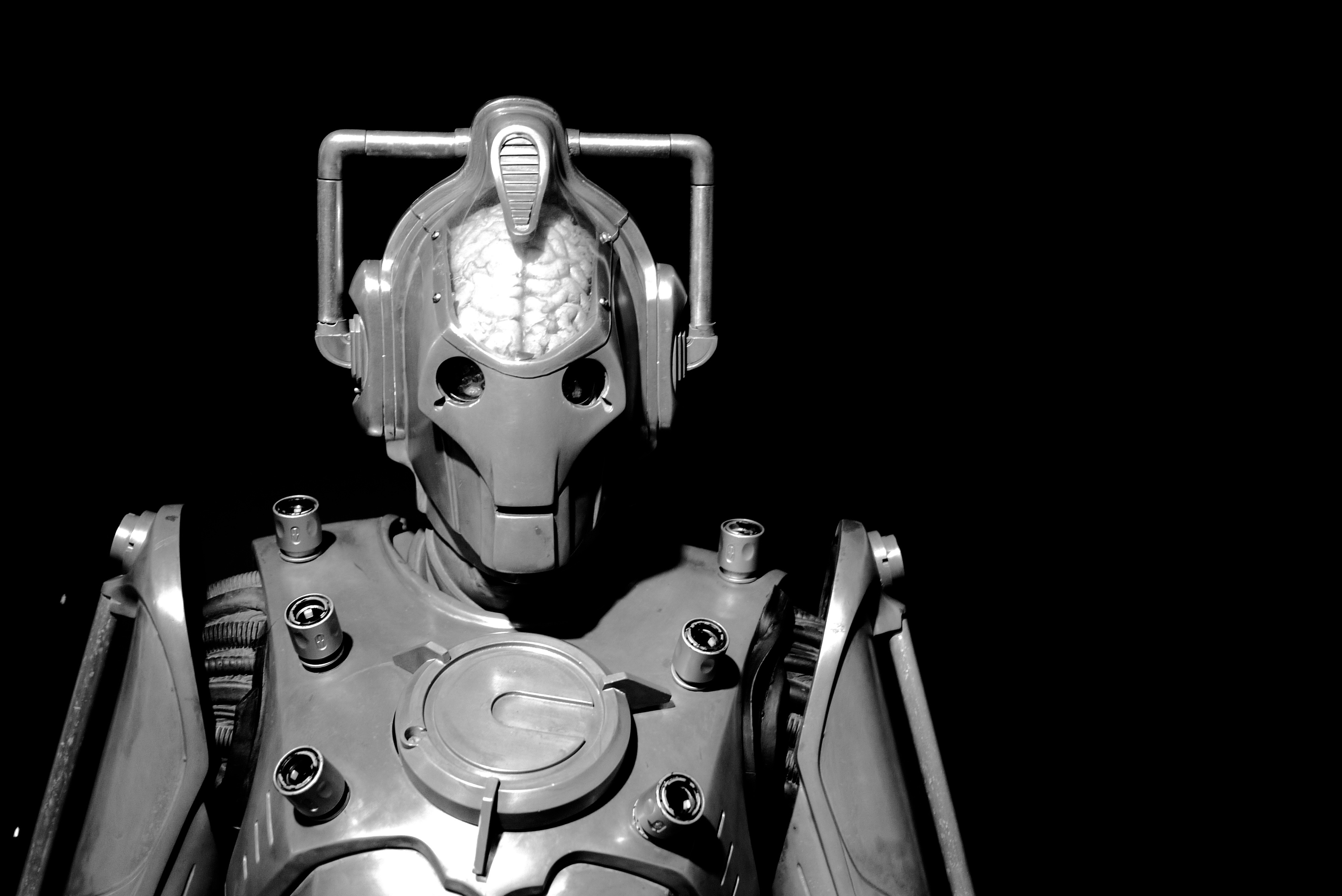
The Cyber Controller, at the Doctor Who Experience.

The Doctor revives the TARDIS with the power cell. Rose reveals to Pete that she is his daughter from another parallel universe. Overwhelmed, Pete walks away. Mickey, feeling that Rose no longer needs him, decides to stay in the parallel universe to help care for Ricky's elderly grandmother (whose counterpart in Mickey's universe died years earlier) and to help the Preachers stop the remaining Cybermen.

=== Continuity ===
As noted by Noel Clarke on the commentary, Mickey phones Rose and says "I'm coming to get you!", which echoes the Ninth Doctor's words to her at the climax of "Bad Wolf".

=== Outside references ===
Pete derisively calls the Preachers "Scooby-Doo and his gang" and compares their van to the Mystery Machine.

== Production ==
According to an interview with Andrew Hayden-Smith, and comments given by Russell T Davies in a press conference, Ricky and Jake were initially intended to be gay lovers. A deleted scene included in the Complete Series Two DVD box set confirms this.

This episode, along with "Rise of the Cybermen", was produced in the same production block as the series finale story, "Army of Ghosts"/"Doomsday". Location shooting took place at the Coal Exchange and Mount Stuart Square, Cardiff Bay. Footage from "Rose" — specifically, the destruction of the Nestene Consciousness – was reused as part of the destruction of the Battersea Cyber-conversion facility.

== Broadcast and reception ==
The average overnight viewing figure for this episode was 6.85 million (a 36% share), peaking at 7.7 million. The final figure rose to 7.63 million. It received an Appreciation Index of 86.

This episode was released together with "Rise of the Cybermen" and "The Idiot's Lantern" as a basic DVD with no special features. It was also released in the complete series 2 box set and the Doctor Who Cybermen collection.

IGN's Ahsan Haque gave "The Age of Steel" a rating of 7.9 out of 10, praising the way Mickey became independent. However, he noted that it worked as a "popcorn episode", with the Cybermen story being a "letdown" and "by-the-book", with the conversation between the Doctor and Lumic about emotions something that was commonly covered in science fiction. Nick Setchfield of SFX gave the two-parter a positive review, highlighting Harper's direction which he felt added imagination and menace to the Cybermen and the parallel universe. However, he felt that Lloyd-Pack's performance was too over-the-top for the current "subtler" incarnation of Doctor Who, which made him come across as "jarringly two-dimensional".
