= Tooth and Claw (Doctor Who) =

169 – "Tooth and Claw"
- Doctor Who episode

Cast
- Doctor: David Tennant – Tenth Doctor
- Companion: Billie Piper – Rose Tyler
- Others: Pauline Collins – Queen Victoria; Ian Hanmore – Father Angelo; Michelle Duncan – Lady Isobel; Derek Riddell – Sir Robert; Jamie Sives – Captain Reynolds; Ron Donachie – Steward; Tom Smith – The Host; Ruth Milne – Flora

Production
- Directed by: Euros Lyn
- Written by: Russell T Davies
- Produced by: Phil Collinson
- Executive producers: Russell T Davies; Julie Gardner
- Music by: Murray Gold
- Production code: 2.2
- Series: Series 2
- Running time: 45 minutes
- First broadcast: 22 April 2006

Chronology
← Preceded by "New Earth"	Followed by → "School Reunion"

"Tooth and Claw" is the second episode of the second series of the British science fiction television series Doctor Who, which was first broadcast on BBC One on 22 April 2006.

The episode is set in Scotland in 1879. In the episode, a group of warrior monks intend to use an alien werewolf (Tom Smith) to take over the British Empire and start an "Empire of the Wolf" by turning Queen Victoria (Pauline Collins) into a werewolf.

This was also the first episode of Series 2 to include mention of "Torchwood", the reocurring mystery box arc of Series 2. This episode also establishes the origins of the Torchwood Institute, which was founded as a secret organisation in 1879 by Queen Victoria to investigate and fight extra-terrestrial threats, including the Doctor, within Britain after her encounter with the Werewolf.

== Plot ==
The Tenth Doctor and Rose land on the Scottish moors in 1879. They encounter a carriage carrying Queen Victoria, who has been forced to travel by roads to Balmoral Castle as a fallen tree has blocked the train line to Aberdeen, which is feared to be a potential assassination attempt. The Doctor poses as the Queen's protector, and he and Rose join the Queen as she travels to the Torchwood Estate, a favourite of her late husband Prince Albert, to spend the night. The royal party is unaware that the Torchwood Estate has been captured by a group of monks led by Father Angelo, forcing its owner, Sir Robert MacLeish, to play into their ruse as they take the place of the house's servants and guards. The monks, having arranged the felling of the tree in order to force the Queen to visit her estate, have brought with them an extraterrestrial werewolf, in the hope that it will pass on its lycanthropeic condition to the Queen and thus pave the way for a new "Empire of the Wolf".

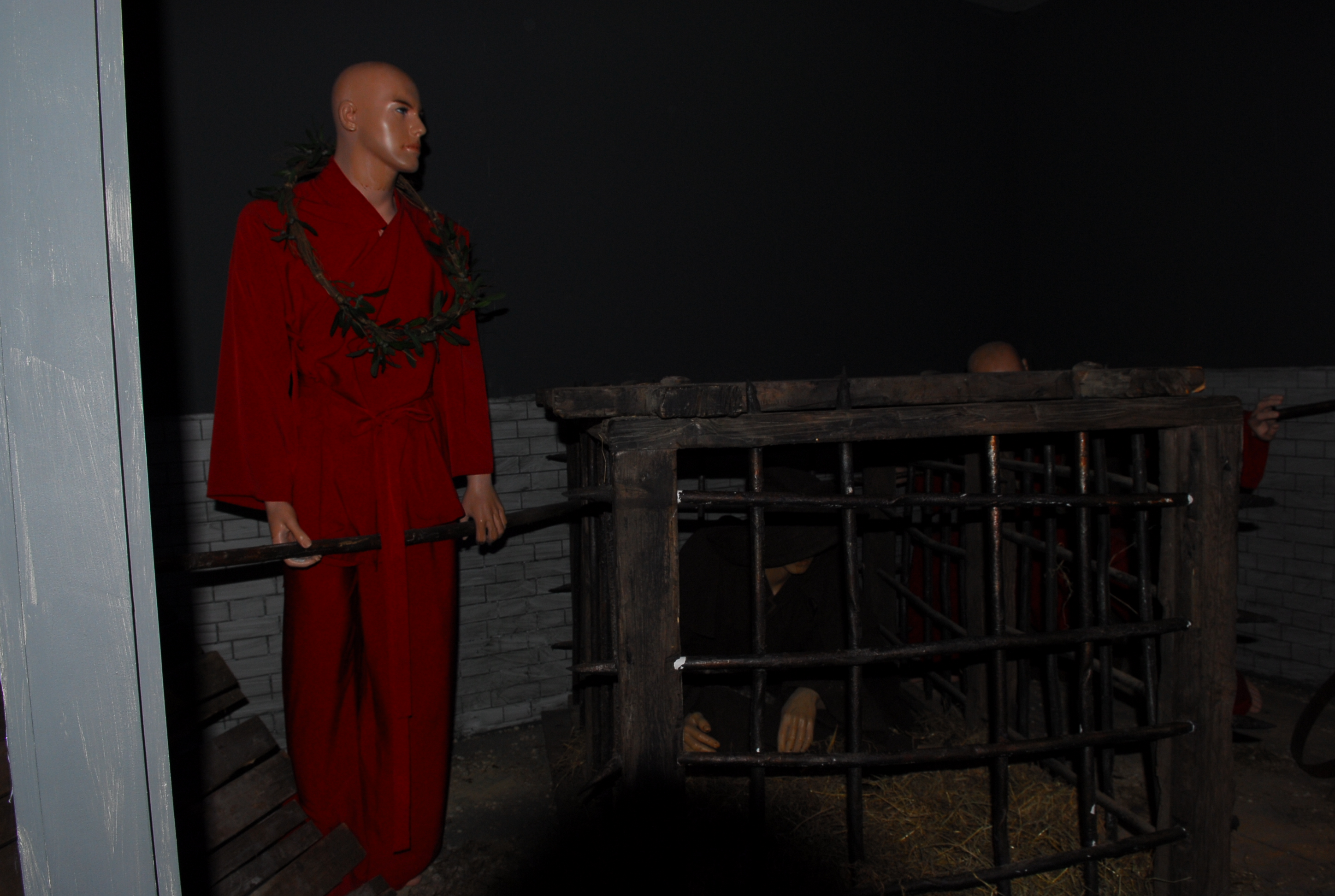
The costume and set of the werewolf, as shown at the Doctor Who Experience.

The Doctor soon realises the trap they have fallen into, and helps to save Rose, the Queen, and Sir Robert from Father Angelo's men and the werewolf by taking shelter in the estate's library, its wood coated with oil of mistletoe wood to stave off the beast. They study the library and discover evidence collected by Sir Robert's father, a polymath, and Prince Albert which indicates the werewolf is an alien being that fell to Earth and inhabited multiple generations of hosts. The Doctor also realises that the estate was designed as a trap for the werewolf, as by use of its strange telescope along with the Queen's Koh-i-Noor diamond, its cut fashioned by Prince Albert, they can destroy the alien lifeform.

Sir Robert sacrifices himself to allow the Doctor, Rose, and the Queen to prepare the telescope in the observatory. They are able to trap and kill the werewolf in the concentrated light of the full moon collected by the diamond. The next day, the Queen gives the Doctor and Rose knighthoods before banishing them from the British Empire. In honour of Sir Robert's sacrifice and his father's ingenuity, she orders the creation of the Torchwood Institute to help defend Britain from further alien attacks, declaring that "if the Doctor should return, then he should beware, because Torchwood will be waiting."

=== Continuity ===
The Doctor introduces himself as "James McCrimmon". Jamie McCrimmon (Frazer Hines) was a young (fictional) Scottish piper from the 18th Century, and a companion of the Second Doctor.

== Production ==
Filming took place between 26 September and 27 October 2005. In the scene where the Doctor and Rose meet the Queen's guards, the Doctor slips into a Scottish accent, which is a reference to actor David Tennant's heritage. Michelle Duncan and Jamie Sives were unable to attend the readthrough for this story, and their parts were read by Tennant's parents, who happened to be visiting the Doctor Who set. Tennant told reporters at the series' press launch, "Because it's set in Scotland they were delighted to be asked to read in. My mum played Lady Isobel and my dad played Captain Reynolds and they were in seventh heaven. And they were genuinely cheesed off when they didn't get asked to play the parts for real! I was like, 'Chill-out, Mum and Dad, back in your box!'"

When the Doctor is asked to identify himself, he says: "I'm Dr James McCrimmon from the township of Balamory." This is a reference to the Second Doctor's companion Jamie McCrimmon (Frazer Hines) and the CBeebies programme Balamory, which is filmed in the town of Tobermory on the Isle of Mull.

Treowen House in Dingestow, Wales, was one of the sites for filming this episode, representing Torchwood House in the Scottish Highlands. Exterior shots were filmed at Craig-y-Nos Castle, Swansea Valley. The monk fight scene was filmed at a courtyard in Dyffryn Gardens, St Nicholas.

At one point during filming, Billie Piper's hair caught fire. Interviewed in Doctor Who Confidential, director Euros Lyn said that various martial arts films were viewed in researching the opening fight sequence, including Crouching Tiger, Hidden Dragon.

The werewolf in this story is computer-generated. Pauline Collins stated in a BBC press release that there were two performance artists who demonstrated the movements that the werewolf would do and talked about the problems of overacting in a situation where one was simply reacting to a green screen. A deleted scene was included on the boxset DVD, where the Doctor and Rose, after being knighted and exiled from the British Empire, run off towards the TARDIS.

=== Cast notes ===
Pauline Collins appeared previously in the series as Samantha Briggs in the Second Doctor serial The Faceless Ones (1967). This makes her the third actor from the classic series to appear in the new series, following William Thomas (Remembrance of the Daleks and "Boom Town") and Nisha Nayar (Paradise Towers and "Bad Wolf"/"The Parting of the Ways"). Collins had been offered a role as a companion in 1967, but had turned this down. According to the accompanying episode commentary, actor Tom Smith, who played the Host, attended drama school with David Tennant.

When Sir Robert offers to precede the Queen out of the window, she calls him "my Sir Walter Raleigh". Actor Derek Riddell had played Raleigh in the BBC drama The Virgin Queen, screened earlier in the year. The script originally had Victoria refer to Sir Francis Drake, until Riddell pointed out that this would have been incorrect for the reference the Queen was making.

== Broadcast and reception ==
Overnight ratings for the episode peaked at 10.03 million (during one five-minute segment). The audience Appreciation Index was 83. The episode received an average of 9.24 million viewers, taking the timeshift into account.

This episode was released on 5 June 2006 as a basic DVD with no special features, together with "School Reunion" and "The Girl in the Fireplace", and as part of a second series boxset on 20 November 2006. This release included an audio commentary by writer Russell T Davies, visual effects supervisor David Houghton and supervising art director Stephen Nicholas.

Ian Berriman of SFX was highly positive of the episode, calling it "frigging ace" and praising Collins' portrayal of Queen Victoria. He particularly praised Davies' writing and the tone of the episode. IGN's Ahsan Haque gave the episode a 7.8 out of 10 rating, highlighting the cinematography and special effects used on the werewolf. However, he thought that the story was "entertaining" and had a "few exciting moments", but it was unsatisfying with elements such as the werewolf chase feeling out of place for Doctor Who. For the website in 2010, Matt Wales named "Tooth and Claw" the seventh best Tenth Doctor episode. However, Dek Hogan of Digital Spy was less positive about the episode, finding it a let-down after the series opener, though he thought the wolf "looked great".
