= Love & Monsters (Doctor Who) =

175 – "Love & Monsters"
- Doctor Who episode
- The Abzorbaloff reveals his true self. The monster was designed by a nine-year-old boy who won a Blue Peter competition.

Cast
- Doctor: David Tennant – Tenth Doctor
- Companion: Billie Piper – Rose Tyler
- Others: Camille Coduri – Jackie Tyler; Peter Kay – Victor Kennedy; Marc Warren – Elton Pope; Shirley Henderson – Ursula Blake; Simon Greenall – Mr Skinner; Moya Brady – Bridget; Kathryn Drysdale – Bliss; Paul Kasey – The Hoix; Bella Emberg – Mrs Croot

Production
- Directed by: Dan Zeff
- Written by: Russell T Davies
- Produced by: Phil Collinson
- Executive producers: Russell T Davies; Julie Gardner
- Music by: Murray Gold
- Production code: 2.10
- Series: Series 2
- Running time: 45 minutes
- First broadcast: 17 June 2006

Chronology
← Preceded by "The Satan Pit"	Followed by → "Fear Her"

"Love & Monsters" is the tenth episode of the second series of the British science fiction television series Doctor Who, which was first broadcast on BBC One on 17 June 2006. It was written by executive producer and lead writer Russell T Davies and directed by Dan Zeff.

The episode is set in London. In the episode, a human called Elton Pope (Marc Warren) joins a group of people who have a shared interest in the alien time traveller the Tenth Doctor (David Tennant) and his ship the TARDIS. The group is joined and taken over by Victor Kennedy (Peter Kay), an alien who has a darker interest in the Doctor and seeks to absorb his physical body and knowledge.

Due to the addition of a Christmas special in the production schedule, two episodes needed to be shot concurrently for production to finish on time. With "Love & Monsters", Davies told a story from a different character's point of view to allow for only a small appearance by lead actors David Tennant and Billie Piper as the Doctor and Rose Tyler respectively, while they filmed the two-part story "The Impossible Planet" and "The Satan Pit". The "Doctor-lite" and "companion-lite" structure has since continued in the programme. Kennedy's alien form, known as the Abzorbaloff, was designed by the winner of a children's competition to design a Doctor Who monster.

"Love & Monsters" was watched by 6.66 million viewers in the United Kingdom and was met with divided reception by critics and fans. Some praised the complexities of the script, while others felt it was a parody or strayed into offensive humour. Kay and the Abzorbaloff also attracted divided opinions.

== Plot ==
Elton Pope sees a photograph of the Tenth Doctor taken during a recent alien invasion (Note: Referring to the events of the 2005 episode "The Christmas Invasion". Elton is also retroactively depicted as a witness to an invasion originally from the 2005 episode "Rose", and a spaceship crashing into London that happened in the 2005 episode "Aliens of London".) on Ursula Blake's blog. Elton recalls seeing the same man in his house when he was a child. Elton and Ursula, with three others, form a group who have similarly encountered the Doctor known as LINDA (London Investigation 'N' Detective Agency). LINDA meets in a library basement to discuss their experiences, but soon their meetings become more social in nature.

One day a man by the name of Victor Kennedy interrupts a meeting and points out that LINDA has lost focus. He reinvigorates the group's efforts to locate the Doctor and Rose by teaching them spying techniques. Elton is given the task of getting close to Rose's mother Jackie. He manages to meet Jackie and is invited to her apartment. She tries and fails to seduce him, but when she finds a picture of Rose in Elton's jacket and realises he is after the Doctor, she demands that he leave her alone. Meanwhile, Bridget and Bliss disappear from the group unexpectedly. After a meeting, Elton, Ursula, and Mr Skinner stage a walkout. Victor persuades Mr Skinner to remain behind, but Elton and Ursula leave. Ursula realises she forgot her phone, and she returns with Elton only to discover that Victor is an alien, whom Elton dubs an Abzorbaloff. The Abzorbaloff reveals that he has absorbed the rest of LINDA and wishes to also absorb the Doctor to gain his accumulated experience and knowledge. He then absorbs Ursula.

Elton is cornered in a dead end alley. As he resigns himself to being absorbed, the Doctor and Rose emerge from the TARDIS nearby. The Abzorbaloff attempts to ransom Elton in exchange for the Doctor, but the Doctor feigns disinterest in Elton's fate, while dropping a hint to the absorbed members of LINDA. In response, the absorbed members collectively use their willpower to suppress the Abzorbaloff, who ends up dropping his cane. At Ursula's prompting, Elton breaks the cane, which causes the Abzorbaloff to melt into the ground. The Doctor then recalls his first encounter with Elton, and explains that he was at Elton's house years ago tracking an elemental shade, but he was too late and the shade killed Elton's mother. The Doctor is able to bring back Ursula in the form of a paving stone, which Elton starts a relationship with.

== Production ==
William Grantham's original drawing for the Abzorbaloff

Unlike the vast majority of Doctor Who stories, "Love & Monsters" has only nominal appearances by the TARDIS crew, and is not from their point of view. This was a production necessity because the Christmas special had increased the number of episodes to produce from 13 to 14. As such, the production was "double banked" with "The Impossible Planet"/"The Satan Pit" so Tennant and Piper could film those episodes while another unit worked on "Love & Monsters". The "Doctor-lite" (and sometimes "companion-lite") structure has continued as a tradition, producing episodes such as "Blink" (2007), "Turn Left" (2008), and "The Girl Who Waited" (2011).

As such, executive producer and writer Russell T Davies had to come up with a story that had a good reason to keep the Doctor and Rose out. Davies was inspired by the Buffy the Vampire Slayer episode "The Zeppo" and the Star Trek: The Next Generation episode "Lower Decks", both of which focused on atypical characters. Davies described the episode, "It's an experimental script. Not so experimental that people will run away screaming from Saturday-night BBC1, because you can experiment too much. People still want a bit of a monster and a bit of a thrill and a bit of the Doctor, so it still delivers as normal Doctor Who. But just as you think you know everything this programme can do, this puts a little bit of spin on it." The episode had the working title of "I Love the Doctor". The acronym "LINDA" was previously used on the British children's television programme Why Don't You?, which featured the "Liverpool Investigation 'N' Detective Agency". Russell T Davies worked on the series for some years.

According to Davies, in an early draft, Elton would have been witness to more events in Doctor Who history: in this draft, Elton's third birthday party was evacuated because of the Dalek invasion of Shoreditch (Remembrance of the Daleks), his mother was killed by a plastic daffodil (Terror of the Autons) instead of an elemental shade, and he also would have been one of those who saw the Loch Ness Monster rising from the Thames (Terror of the Zygons). Prior to the revival of Doctor Who, Davies had considered pitching this story idea to Doctor Who Magazine as a comics story. Davies had also considered making the viewpoint character of the story a woman but felt that he already had enough focus on female guest characters that series. Davies wanted Elton to be a "normal guy" and not geeky with a "funny voice". It is noted Elton's memory may not be entirely reliable, so whether events in the episode happened the way he remembers them is debatable.

Another necessity the episode had to fulfill was to include the winner of Blue Peter's "Design a Doctor Who Monster" competition. The winner, the Abzorbaloff, was designed by nine-year-old William Grantham. Davies said of the monster, "I thought the Abzorbaloff was brilliant. It touches people, absorbs them and their face actually appears in the body — terrifying." According to producer Phil Collinson, Grantham was disappointed with the rendering of the monster because he had envisaged it being "the size of a double-decker bus", but the production team was never informed of this. Grantham, who subsequently went on to become gaming YouTuber 'Channel Dog', fondly recounted the experience in a 2021 retrospective. He was given a set visit and was treated well by the cast and crew, even crediting it with inspiring a career in media.

Peter Kay had written a letter to Davies after the new series began in June 2005, and Davies replied to him in September offering a guest spot in an episode. Kay was originally offered the part of Elton, but he felt the "UFO-spotter type" was too similar to his character on Coronation Street and much preferred playing the "baddie". The creature that Elton sees at the start of the episode is credited as the "Hoix". Davies notes in the commentary that the name was invented only after the episode was shot and a name was needed for the credits.

Director Dan Zeff said of the tone the production team wished to capture, "Working with an inspirational design team, we wanted to emphasise a melancholy feel, an emptiness in the world around our characters – big urban spaces that once may have been full of life, but now lay abandoned, rusting, decayed. Amidst this, Elton and his fragile group of friends would almost feel cast adrift – increasingly vulnerable as they are led astray by the sinister Victor Kennedy." The episode features the songs "Mr. Blue Sky", "Don't Bring Me Down", and "Turn to Stone" by Electric Light Orchestra (ELO), Elton's favourite band.

== Broadcast and reception ==
"Love & Monsters" was first broadcast in the United Kingdom on BBC One on 17 June 2006. Overnight ratings for the UK were 6.22 million, a 38.3% audience share. Its final audience figure was 6.66 million, making it the 15th most watched programme of the week. The episode gained an Appreciation Index score of 76. This episode was released on a basic DVD together with "The Impossible Planet" and "The Satan Pit" on 7 August 2006. It was then rereleased as part of the Complete Second Series boxset on 20 November 2006.

"Love & Monsters" is noted for having a divided reception. Nick Setchfield of SFX rated the episode 4.5 out of 5, noting how it "finally gives Doctor Who a whole new vocabulary as a television programme." He wrote, "This may be Russell T Davies's smartest, funniest script. It's certainly the warmest, and somehow it feels like the most personal." While Setchfield was not a fan of Kay, he found his performance in this episode funny. IGN's Ahsan Haque gave the episode a score of 9.5 out of 10, particularly praising the dialogue. However, he felt that some of the sadder aspects "seemed out of place in what should have been a purely light-hearted comedic episode". Slant Magazine reviewer Ross Ruediger was positive towards "Love & Monsters", saying that "there's no reason the series can't do something this quirky and beautiful when an inspired mind conjures up such a scenario." Ruediger commented on the truths of meeting other fans on the Internet and praised the depth of Jackie's character.

In 2011, SFX named "Love & Monsters" as one of the best Sci-Fi TV Mockumentaries, saying that it worked as an example of the genre and was not too bad on rewatch. The article noted that criticisms of the episode ranged from "Kay's overacting and the silly Slitheen-esque monster to annoyance at how, well, lame the members of LINDA are." Louisa Pearson of The Scotsman noted that hardcore fans would dislike the comedy and the "panto" performance of Kay, but commented, "It's true, this episode came close to being a spoof, but it was actually quite nice to have a rest from the Doctor. Even saving the world gets boring sometimes." Arnold T Blumburg of Now Playing gave the episode a grade of D−. He was positive towards the first 30 minutes, which he described as a "touching little tale" with interesting characters, but called the final 10 minutes "juvenile attack on the audience's intelligence and emotions" that ruined the episode with "a laughable monster and offensive humor at exactly the wrong moment". Digital Spy's Dek Hogan criticised Kay's performance, calling the Abzorbaloff "a marvellous idea and it's a pity his creativity was absorbed by a turn from a visiting comedian". In a review of the series, Stephen Brook of The Guardian stated that he "hated" the episode, describing it as a "parody of Doctor Who fans". The scene where Elton says he and Ursula have "a bit of a love life" was criticised by some commentators, who felt that the resultant implication of having oral sex with a paving slab was unsuitable for Doctor Who's large family audience; others, however, dismissed this dialogue as a harmless joke that children would not understand. "Love & Monsters" was placed in 153rd position in Doctor Who Magazine's Mighty 200 reader survey in 2009, which ranked every Doctor Who story to that point in order of preference.
