= Rory Jennings =

British actor

- Born: 20 July 1983 (age 43); Kilburn, London, England
- Education: University of Liverpool
- Occupations: Actor, YouTuber

Rory Jennings (born 20 July 1983) is a British former actor, radio presenter and social media personality. He played Patrick Trueman in the BBC soap opera EastEnders from 27 July to 7 September 2007. He is also a Chelsea F.C. supporter, presenting on Talksport and YouTube channels.

== Early life ==
Jennings was born in London, England. He has been acting since the age of 10. As a child actor he trained at the Sylvia Young Theatre School; he took a break from acting in 2001 to study a BA in politics at the University of Liverpool where he attained a first class honours degree.

== Acting career ==
=== Theatre ===
Year	Title	Role	Theatre
2004	Gong Donkeys	David	Bush Theatre

=== Television ===
Source
Year	Title	Role	Notes
1994	Magic Grandad	Ned	S2.E1 "Famous People: Elizabeth I"
1994, 2006, 2010	Casualty	Danny Miller, Kevin Bingham, Ashley	S9.E9, S21.E1, S24.E32
1995–1997	The Fast Show	Toby, Boy in Village	11 Episodes
2000	Urban Gothic	Eustace	S1.E10 "Pineapple Chunks"
2000	Randall & Hopkirk (Deceased)	Daniel Gill	S1.E3 "The Best Years of Your Death"
2005	All About George	Russell	6 Episodes
2005	Jericho	Edmund Swettenham	
2006	Doctor Who	Tommy Connolly	S2.E7: "The Idiot's Lantern"
2007	EastEnders	Craig Dixon	15 Episodes
2007–2008	The Bill	Jimmy Cunningham, Danny Stepney	S23.E22 S24.E71
2008	Harry & Paul	Darren (HSBC Post Employee)	S2.E3
2014	Glue	Tim	S1.E2 "James/Janine"

=== Film ===
Year	Title	Role	Notes
1994	Mary Shelley's Frankenstein	Young Victor	
1994	Fatherland	Pili	
1995	The Affair	David Leyand	
1998	Diana: A Tribute to the People's Princess	Prince Harry	
1999	Tom's Midnight Garden	James (12 years)	
2008	Cass	Young Freeman	
2008	Shifty	Otis	

=== Music videos ===
Year	Artist	Song
2007	The Chemical Brothers	"The Salmon Dance"

=== Commercials ===
'The People's Post Office' advert for the Post Office, directed by Armando Iannucci.
