= Attack of the Graske =

- Doctor Who interactive episode
- The Graske claims another victim.

Cast
- Doctor: David Tennant (Tenth Doctor)
- Companion: The Viewer
- Others: Lisa Palfrey — Mum; Nicholas Beveney — Dad; Mollie Kabia — Girl; James Harris — Boy; Robin Meredith — Granddad; Gwenyth Petty — Grandma; Roger Nott — Older man; Catherine Olding — Young woman; Jimmy Vee — Graske; Ben Oliver — Urchin

Production
- Directed by: Ashley Way
- Written by: Gareth Roberts
- Script editor: Simon Winstone
- Produced by: Jo Pearce; Sophie Fante; Andrew Whitehouse
- Executive producers: Russell T Davies; Julie Gardner
- Music by: Murray Gold
- Running time: 14 minutes
- First broadcast: 25 December 2005

Chronology
← Preceded by "The Christmas Invasion"	Followed by → "New Earth"

"Attack of the Graske" is an interactive mini-episode of the British science fiction television series Doctor Who that was first broadcast on the BBC Red Button service on 25 December 2005. It was then made available as an online game on the official Doctor Who website, until Adobe Flash was discontinued in 2021.

== Plot ==
The Tenth Doctor welcomes the viewer into the TARDIS. His current companion, Rose, has been dropped off at Wembley in 1979 for an ABBA concert. He then imbues the viewer's television remote control with the power of his sonic screwdriver, allowing the viewer to take part in the proceedings.

A family celebrate Christmas in a living room. The mother has been replaced by a double and is alone with the father in the house's kitchen. A Graske, a species that invades planets by replacing its population, transmats onto a table, where he zaps the father. When he is done, the Graske transmats away, leaving a changeling of the father behind to join that of the mother.

As the Doctor tracks the Graske through time, the viewer takes command of the TARDIS's controls. Eventually, the Graske is located in High Holborn on Christmas 1883. The viewer takes a quick walk around a square and uncovers the Graske from behind some boxes.

Having been found, the Graske kidnaps a young street urchin, and, as before, leaves a changeling in his place. Tracking the Graske, the Doctor takes the viewer to the Graske's base on Griffoth and guides them through the base. The viewer arrives in a room filled with various beings in stasis pods; the Graske keep the originals to sustain the copies and seek to replace every sentient creature in the universe with a double.

However, the viewer is spotted and ducks to avoid a Graske's weapon fire. The blast ricochets around the room and frees a Slitheen from a pod, who then proceeds to vengefully chase the Graske who imprisoned it.

The viewer can then make a choice, resulting in two alternative endings to the episode:

- If the viewer decides to freeze the entire Graske base, the Graske and all of their victims become trapped. The changeling mother and father talk mechanically with the rest of their family, and the daughter storms off to her room, believing that her parents are trying to ruin Christmas.
- If the decision is made to send the victims back, the viewer sees all the stasis pods being emptied, and the mother and father of the family are quickly glimpsed celebrating at home.

The programme evaluates the viewer's "score", before the Doctor removes the sonic powers from the viewer's remote control and bids them farewell, firing up the TARDIS to go back for Rose.

== Production ==
Shooting Attack of the Graske

This episode had the working title Changeling World. Executive producer Julie Gardner told Doctor Who Magazine that the mini-episode was treated as a "full-blooded, sophisticated production," with a new alien villain, new sets and new special effects. Writer Gareth Roberts went on to write the episodes "Invasion of the Bane" (co-written with Russell T Davies), Revenge of the Slitheen, The Empty Planet, Goodbye, Sarah Jane Smith (co-written with Clayton Hickman), The Temptation of Sarah Jane Smith, The Wedding of Sarah Jane Smith and Whatever Happened to Sarah Jane? for the Doctor Who spin-off The Sarah Jane Adventures, as well as the Doctor Who episodes "The Shakespeare Code", "The Unicorn and the Wasp", "Planet of the Dead" (co-written with Davies), "The Lodger", "Closing Time", and "The Caretaker" (co-written with Steven Moffat).

The countdown to the start of the segment uses a design based on the Gallifreyan script seen in the series, and includes both Arabic numerals and the Gallifreyan numerals used in the New Series Adventures. The countdown shown for the tasks is a simplified version of this which does not include the Gallifreyan numerals.

Unlike all other new series episodes, this episode is presented in 4:3 aspect ratio.

This episode was the only interactive episode to be telecasted on BBC or any affiliate of the British Broadcasting Corporation (BBC), but it is still available at the BBC or the official Doctor Who website.

Location shooting took place at the Coal Exchange and Mount Stuart Square, Cardiff Bay.

=== Music ===
The music played during the countdown is the orchestral arrangement of the Doctor Who theme music which plays over the credits of "The Christmas Invasion". The musical cue used during the later challenge sequences is from "The End of the World".

== Broadcast ==
A total of 496,000 viewers played Attack of the Graske on the BBC Red Button service. The episode was available again following the New Year's Day repeat transmission of "The Christmas Invasion". As of 30 March 2006 the game had an average of 41,000 hits every week on the BBC's Doctor Who website.
