= The Idiot's Lantern =

173 – "The Idiot's Lantern"
- Doctor Who episode

Cast
- Doctor: David Tennant – Tenth Doctor
- Companion: Billie Piper – Rose Tyler
- Others: Maureen Lipman – The Wire; Ron Cook – Magpie; Jamie Foreman – Eddie Connolly; Debra Gillett – Rita Connolly; Rory Jennings – Tommy Connolly; Margaret John – Grandma Connolly; Sam Cox – Detective Inspector Bishop; Ieuan Rhys – Crabtree; Jean Challis – Aunty Betty; Christopher Driscoll – Security Guard; Marie Lewis – Mrs Gallagher

Production
- Directed by: Euros Lyn
- Written by: Mark Gatiss
- Produced by: Phil Collinson
- Executive producers: Russell T Davies; Julie Gardner
- Music by: Murray Gold
- Production code: 2.7
- Series: Series 2
- Running time: 45 minutes
- First broadcast: 27 May 2006

Chronology
← Preceded by "The Age of Steel"	Followed by → "The Impossible Planet"

"The Idiot's Lantern" is the seventh episode of the second series of the British science fiction television series Doctor Who, which was first broadcast on 27 May 2006 on BBC One. It was written by Mark Gatiss and directed by Euros Lyn.

The episode is set in London in 1953, at the time of the coronation of Elizabeth II. In the episode, the incorporeal alien the Wire (Maureen Lipman) intends to regain a physical body by consuming enough energy from the minds of the coronation's television audience.

== Plot ==
The Tenth Doctor and Rose land in Muswell Hill, North London in 1953. While looking around, they see that most houses have TV antennas, which Rose recalls should be rare at this time. Mr. Magpie, a local merchant, informs them that the TVs are on sale to celebrate the upcoming coronation of Elizabeth II.

The Doctor and Rose witness someone being taken from their home with a sheet over their head, and driven away by the police. The Doctor and Rose question the Connollys, a local family consisting of the bullying Eddie, his timid wife Rita, and their teenage son, Tommy. They are introduced to Grandma Connolly, Rita's mother, whose entire face is missing. Before the Doctor can learn more, the police burst in and remove Grandma Connolly; the Doctor follows.

At Magpie's shop, Rose discovers an entity hiding in a TV calling itself "the Wire", an alien that escaped execution by its people by turning itself into an electrical form. The Wire seeks to consume enough minds to recreate a body, intending to use the coronation broadcast to do so. Rose then falls victim to the Wire.

Meanwhile, Tommy discovers that his father has been informing the police about the faceless people, including Grandma Connolly. When Rita finds out, she kicks Eddie out of the house, and tells Tommy to go with the Doctor and "do some good".

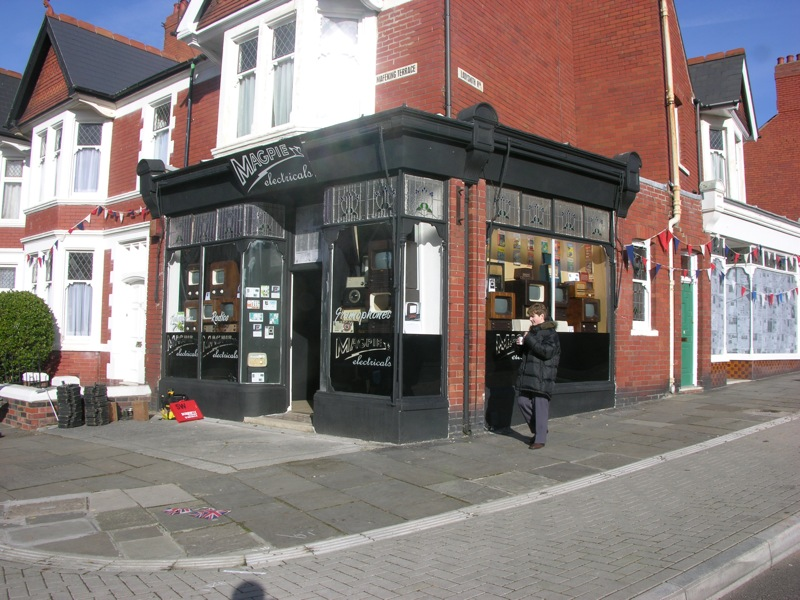
Magpie's shop, on location in Cardiff.

The Doctor locates a holding pen where the police are keeping the victims. He speaks to Detective Inspector Bishop, and the police bring in a faceless Rose. Angered at Rose's condition, the Doctor, Tommy, and Bishop confront Magpie at his store. The Wire reveals herself and tries to consume them, but upon seeing the Doctor's sonic screwdriver, she stops, retreats into a portable television set built by Magpie, and escapes, heading for the Alexandra Palace television station.

The Doctor and Tommy use equipment from Magpie's shop and the TARDIS to create a device to capture the Wire. The Doctor pursues Magpie as he connects his portable device to the television station transmitter, allowing the Wire to start to consume minds while killing Magpie. The Doctor connects his device to the transmitter, and the Wire is captured on a Betamax cassette. The victims of the Wire are returned to normal. Rose persuades Tommy to reconcile with his father.

== Production ==
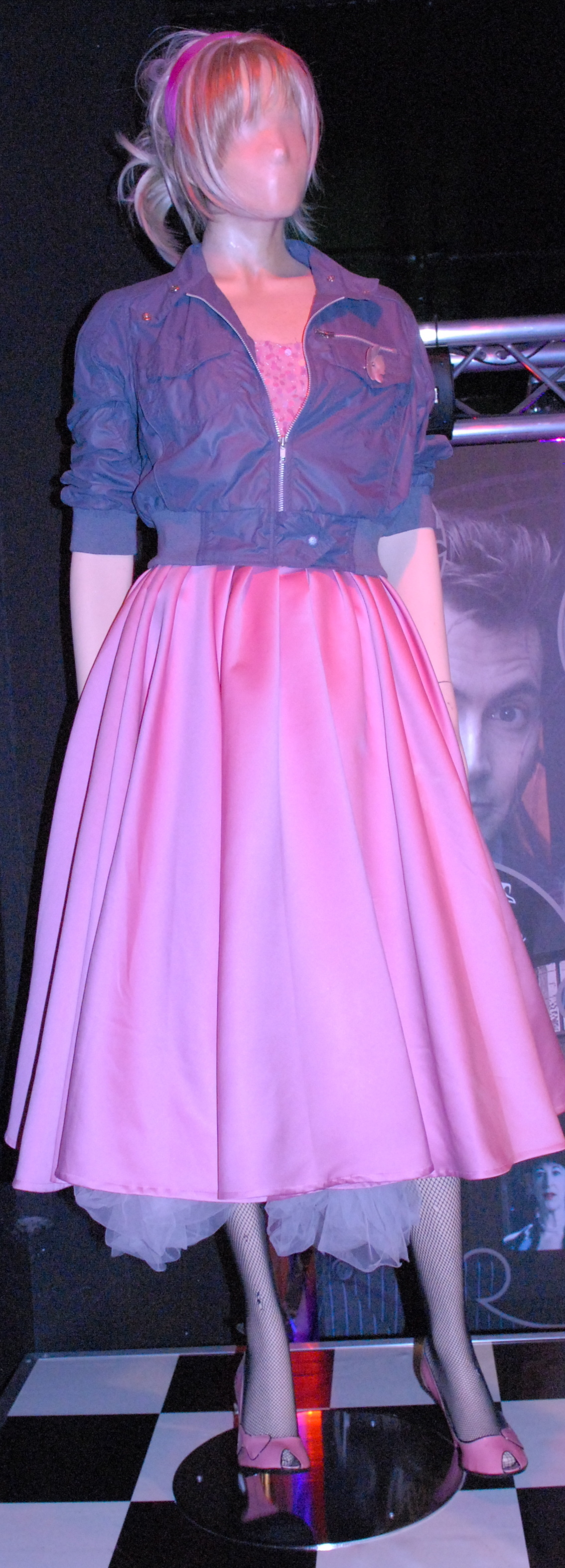
Rose's costume for the episode, as shown at the Doctor Who Experience.

"The Idiot's Lantern" is written by Mark Gatiss, who also wrote the Ninth Doctor episode "The Unquiet Dead" as well as several spin-off audios and novels. The title of the episode was suggested by writer Gareth Roberts, who recalled the term being used by his father to refer to television.

The episode is set in the Muswell Hill area of London, and second-unit photography was conducted around Alexandra Palace. The exterior of Magpie's shop was filmed on Blenheim Road in Cardiff.

The game associated with this episode, the "Magpie Online Archive", is a "file-sharing application" in which the player must search through various clips of BBC television history to look for messages left behind by the Wire. Unlike earlier games, it is only accessible through the BBC Doctor Who website.

=== Cast notes ===
Rory Jennings, who plays Tommy Connolly, plays the teenage Davros in Big Finish Productions' I, Davros: Innocence. Margaret John, who plays Tommy's Grandma, also played Megan Jones in the Second Doctor serial Fury from the Deep (1968).

== Broadcast and reception ==
Overnight viewing figures for the initial broadcast of this episode were 6.32 million, peaking at 7.78 million, an audience share of 32.2%. The final rating was 6.76 million, making it the most watched programme of the day. It was given an Appreciation Index of 84. This episode was released as a basic DVD with no special features in the UK in July 2006, together with "Rise of the Cybermen" and "The Age of Steel".

Ian Berriman of SFX gave "The Idiot's Lantern" a rating of four out of five, calling the main plot "fairly insubstantial" and noting it would not please viewers who liked everything explained. However, he referred to it as "enjoyable" and praised the directing of Euros Lyn. Berriman considered the highlight of the episode to be the subplot of family. IGN's Ahsan Haque rated the episode 6.8 out of 10, calling the story "marginally interesting". Digital Spy reviewer Dek Hogan felt "The Idiot's Lantern" was a disappointment after Gatiss's previous Doctor Who script "The Unquiet Dead", feeling that a similar plot had been done before and it played like a "pastiche of Doctor Who than the show itself".
