= The Girl in the Fireplace =

171 – "The Girl in the Fireplace"
- Doctor Who episode

Cast
- Doctor: David Tennant – Tenth Doctor
- Companions: Billie Piper – Rose Tyler; Noel Clarke – Mickey Smith
- Others: Sophia Myles – Reinette; Ben Turner – King Louis; Jessica Atkins – Young Reinette; Angel Coulby – Katherine; Gareth Wyn Griffiths – Manservant; Paul Kasey – Clockwork Man; Ellen Thomas – Clockwork Woman; Jonathan Hart, Emily Joyce – Alien Voices

Production
- Directed by: Euros Lyn
- Written by: Steven Moffat
- Produced by: Phil Collinson
- Executive producers: Russell T Davies; Julie Gardner
- Music by: Murray Gold
- Production code: 2.4
- Series: Series 2
- Running time: 45 minutes
- First broadcast: 6 May 2006

Chronology
← Preceded by "School Reunion"	Followed by → "Rise of the Cybermen"

"The Girl in the Fireplace" is the fourth episode of the second series of the British science fiction television series Doctor Who. It was first broadcast on BBC One on 6 May 2006. Written by Steven Moffat and directed by Euros Lyn, the episode is inspired by Audrey Niffenegger's novel The Time Traveler's Wife.

The episode is set in France throughout the 18th century. In the episode, repair androids from a spaceship from the 51st century create time windows to stalk Madame de Pompadour (Sophia Myles) throughout her life. They seek to remove her brain as a replacement part for their spaceship at a particular point in her life as they believe her to be compatible with the ship.

The programme's executive producer Russell T Davies, who conceived the idea while researching for Casanova, described the episode as a love story for the show's protagonist the Tenth Doctor (David Tennant). The episode was filmed in England and Wales in October 2005. "The Girl in the Fireplace" was well received by most critics, was nominated for a Nebula Award and won the 2007 Hugo Award for Best Dramatic Presentation, Short Form.

== Plot ==
The Tenth Doctor, Rose, and Mickey arrive aboard a derelict spaceship in the 51st century. They find a time window, a portal to another place in space and time, shaped like a Baroque fireplace. On the other side is a girl named Reinette, who lives in 18th-century Paris. The Doctor steps through and finds himself in Reinette's bedroom, in time to save her from a sinister clockwork automaton. He takes the automaton back with him and identifies it as a repair droid from the ship. When the Doctor returns to Reinette's world, he finds that she has grown into a beautiful young woman. They flirt and kiss. A servant calls for Reinette using her real name and the Doctor realises she is Madame de Pompadour, the future mistress of Louis XV.

The ship contains several other time windows, each leading to a different moment in Reinette's life. The Doctor sees another droid in one of the windows and steps through to confront it. The droid reveals that it and its companions killed the ship's crew in order to use their organs as parts. They now want Reinette's brain to replace the ship's computer. Believing the transplant would only work if Reinette and the ship were the same age, they opened a series of time windows to find one in which she was 37. Rose asks why they want Reinette in particular. The droid simply says, "We are the same."

Another droid radios the ship to say it has found the 37-year-old Reinette, at a costume ball in Versailles. The droids arrive and take her captive. The Doctor cannot follow them without destroying the time window, but does so anyway, stranding himself and the droids in the 18th century. Cut off from their world, the droids shut down. Reinette tells the Doctor she had her fireplace moved to Versailles in the hope that he would return. The Doctor finds it still operational and uses it to return to the ship, promising Reinette he will come back for her. When he returns, he finds that six years have passed and Reinette has died. Louis gives him a letter in which she confesses her love for him.

As the Doctor and his companions prepare to leave, they wonder again why the droids wanted Reinette specifically. The episode ends with an exterior shot of the spaceship; its name is the SS Madame de Pompadour.

== Production ==
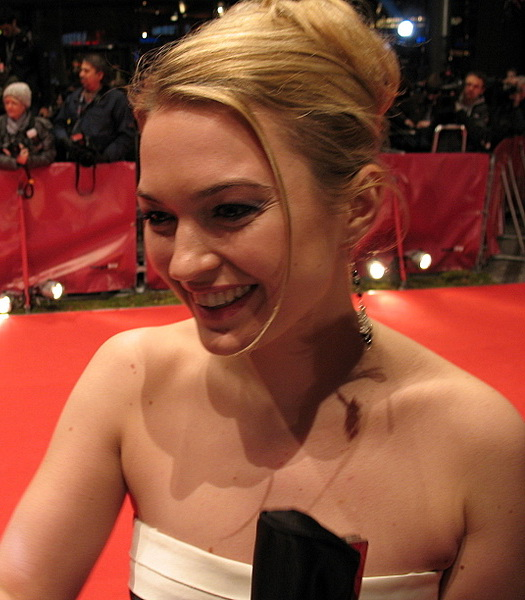
Actress Sophia Myles appeared in the episode as Madame de Pompadour.

=== Writing and characters ===
In 2004, Russell T Davies—Doctor Who's executive producer—was responsible for Casanova, a serial set in the 18th century. During his research, Davies became fascinated by Madame de Pompadour and wanted to include her in a story which also involved The Turk—a clockwork man who played chess around the same period and which was later revealed to be a hoax. In early 2005, Steven Moffat—who had written "The Empty Child" and "The Doctor Dances" for the series—was assigned to write the story. Euros Lyn was later assigned to direct it. Sophia Myles stated in an interview on Doctor Who Confidential that she did not have to audition for the role of Madame de Pompadour, she was offered it.

In an interview with The Independent, Davies said the episode is "practically a love story for the Doctor ... It's very understated, very beautifully done, but it's nonetheless a Time Lord falling in love and Rose's reaction to him falling in love with someone else." Moffat was inspired by Audrey Niffenegger's novel The Time Traveler's Wife, though the episode's structure is different from that of the novel. During the production, Moffat considered "Madame de Pompadour", "Every Tick of My Heart", "Reinette and the Lonely Angel" and "Loose Connection" for the episode's title. "The Girl in the Fireplace" was originally planned as the second episode of the series, but was later changed as production went on.

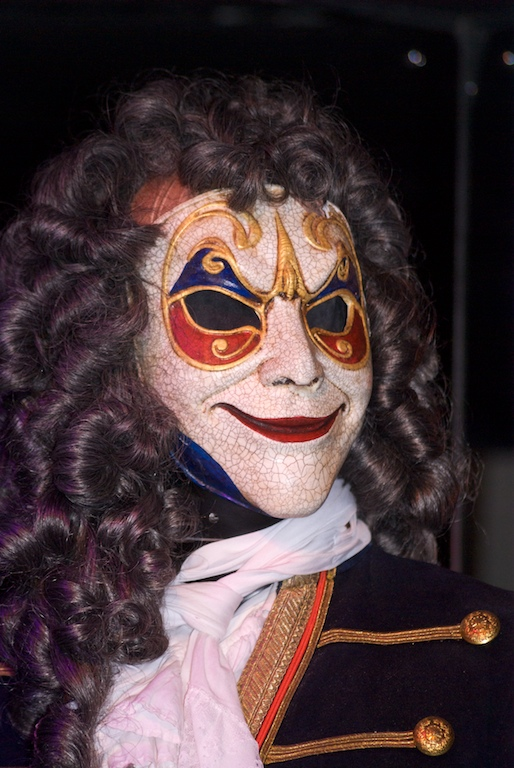
The clockwork droids as they appear at the Doctor Who Experience.

While Moffat was creating the clockwork automata he first decided to hide their faces with wigs, but when producer Phil Collinson told him this would severely limit camera angles usable during filming, the androids were given carnival masks to wear. Neill Gorton of Millennium Effects designed the androids and they were constructed by Richard Darwen and Gustav Hoegan.

While the episode appears to follow immediately from the previous episode "School Reunion", Moffat says in the DVD audio commentary that when he wrote "The Girl in the Fireplace" he had not yet read the end of "School Reunion", hence the lack of Rose's continuing animosity shown towards Mickey after he joins the TARDIS crew. After reading the Doctor's mind, Reinette says "Doctor who?", a reference both to the series' title and to the long-running mystery about the Doctor's actual name. She also says that it is "more than just a secret", but does not elaborate further. Moffat said that he added the dialogue because he believes that because the Doctor does not tell even his closest companions his name, there must be a "dreadful secret" about it. Moffat also says that he did not include the word "Torchwood" (an "arc word" in the second series) in the script because Davies did not ask him to do so.

=== Filming ===
Filming for the episode took place between 12 and 27 October 2005. The scenes set in Versailles were filmed elsewhere: the first scenes filmed, in which Reinette's body is taken away, were filmed at Culverhouse Cross in Cardiff; Madame de Pompadour's sitting room and bedroom scenes were filmed at Tredegar House—a 17th-century mansion in Newport; Dyffryn Gardens, in the Vale of Glamorgan, was used as the set for the palace gardens; and Ragley Hall near Alcester was used for the ballroom scenes. The scenes on the spaceship, which were shot by the second unit, were also filmed in Newport.

Two horses were used in the episode; one was used for the scenes in close quarters on the spaceship, and another for jumps. According to Doctor Who Confidential, the horse was not allowed into the ballroom for the climactic scene. Thus, the elements of the Doctor riding through the mirror, the horse, the mirror breaking and the reactions of the extras in the ballroom had to be filmed separately and then composited together with chroma key. Tennant's head was superimposed upon that of the stunt rider in post-production. Initially, the programme's staff considered the use of special effects but realised this would be very expensive and rejected the idea.

== Broadcast and reception ==
The Girl in the Fireplace was first broadcast in the United Kingdom on BBC One on 6 May 2006. The final rating for the episode was 7.90 million, making it the sixth most-watched programme on BBC1 that week. It received an Appreciation Index of 84. The episode's script was nominated for the 2006 Nebula Award, and "The Girl in the Fireplace" won the 2007 Hugo Award for Best Dramatic Presentation, Short Form.

Writing for IGN, Ahsan Haque praised Tennant and Myles' acting, the episode's pacing and the "extremely touching" story, but felt it failed to sufficiently explain why the Doctor could not use the TARDIS to see Reinette before she died. He wrote that "with a little more attention to temporal details, this episode would have been considered as one of the series' greatest moments". Metro said the clockwork androids were one of the "most memorable villains" while The Guardian's Daniel Martin said "The Girl in the Fireplace" is "one of the most acclaimed episodes from the [original] Davies era".

Ross Ruediger from Slant Magazine wrote that the episode "may be the crowning achievement" of Doctor Who's second series. Ruediger called it an episode "for the new millennium" as he thought it "could never exist under the banner of the old series." He called it a "thought-provoking piece", and wrote that episodes like this could not be broadcast every week since it "would be too taxing on the average viewer's brain". IGN's Matt Wales ranked "The Girl in the Fireplace" the third best Tennant Doctor Who story, calling it "one of Doctor Who's most touching adventures".

Not all reviews were positive. In a 2008 retrospective piece, Nivair H. Gabrie criticised problematic elements of the episode, calling the Doctor and Reinette's relationship a "random, thoughtless romance". He similarly called the Doctor's decision to give up his and his companion's lives for Reinette "pretty jarring" and contrasting with his established character. In the 2015 book The Doctors Are In, co-author Stacey Smith praised the cast but found the Doctor and Reinette's relationship awkward, especially due to the Doctor first meeting her as a child. She criticises the dialogue and characterisation – questioning, for example, Rose's small role and her lack of upset at the Doctor leaving her for Reinette, calling it "criminal" for Rose.

A sequel to the episode, written by Moffat and dubbed "Pompadour", was released as part of a watchalong of the episode in May 2020. The story depicts Reinette worrying about a potential duplicate of her thoughts and memories being made, before it is revealed that the Reinette speaking is in fact the copy, stored on-board the spaceship.

== See also ==
- Clockpunk
- Moberly–Jourdain incident, a supposed real life incident of time travel at Versailles.
