= The Christmas Invasion =

Special 2005 episode of Doctor Who

167 – "The Christmas Invasion"
- Doctor Who episode

Cast
- Doctor: David Tennant – Tenth Doctor
- Companion: Billie Piper – Rose Tyler
- Others: Camille Coduri – Jackie Tyler; Noel Clarke – Mickey Smith; Penelope Wilton – Harriet Jones; Adam Garcia – Alex Klein; Daniel Evans – Danny Llewellyn; Sean Gilder – Sycorax Leader; Anita Briem – Sally Jacobs; Chu Omambala – Major Blake; Sian McDowell – Sandra; Paul Anderson – Jason; Cathy Murphy – Mum; Sean Carlsen – Policeman; Jason Mohammad – Newsreader 1; Sagar Arya – Newsreader 2; Lachele Carl – Newsreader 3

Production
- Directed by: James Hawes
- Written by: Russell T Davies
- Produced by: Phil Collinson
- Executive producers: Russell T Davies; Julie Gardner
- Music by: Murray Gold
- Production code: 2.X
- Running time: 60 minutes
- First broadcast: 25 December 2005

Chronology
← Preceded by "The Parting of the Ways"	Followed by → "New Earth"

"The Christmas Invasion" is a 60-minute special episode of the British science fiction television programme Doctor Who, first broadcast on BBC One on 25 December 2005. This episode features the first full-episode appearance of David Tennant as the Doctor. It is also the first specially produced Christmas special in the programme's history, commissioned following the success of the first series earlier in the year, to see how well the show could do at Christmas. It was written by showrunner and executive producer Russell T Davies and was directed by James Hawes.

In the episode, principally set in London, the newly regenerated Tenth Doctor is out of action, leaving Rose, Mickey and Jackie to combat the invasion of an alien race known as the Sycorax. The Sycorax demand that either humanity have to surrender half of themselves as slaves or one third of them will die through the Sycorax's blood control.

"The Christmas Invasion" was watched by 9.84 million viewers, the highest-rated episode of the Tenth Doctor, up until the "Voyage of the Damned", which achieved an audience of 13.31 million viewers. The episode received positive reviews from critics, who welcomed Tennant to the show, and is considered one of the best Christmas specials of the show, with its success leading to the Christmas special becoming an annual tradition.

== Plot ==
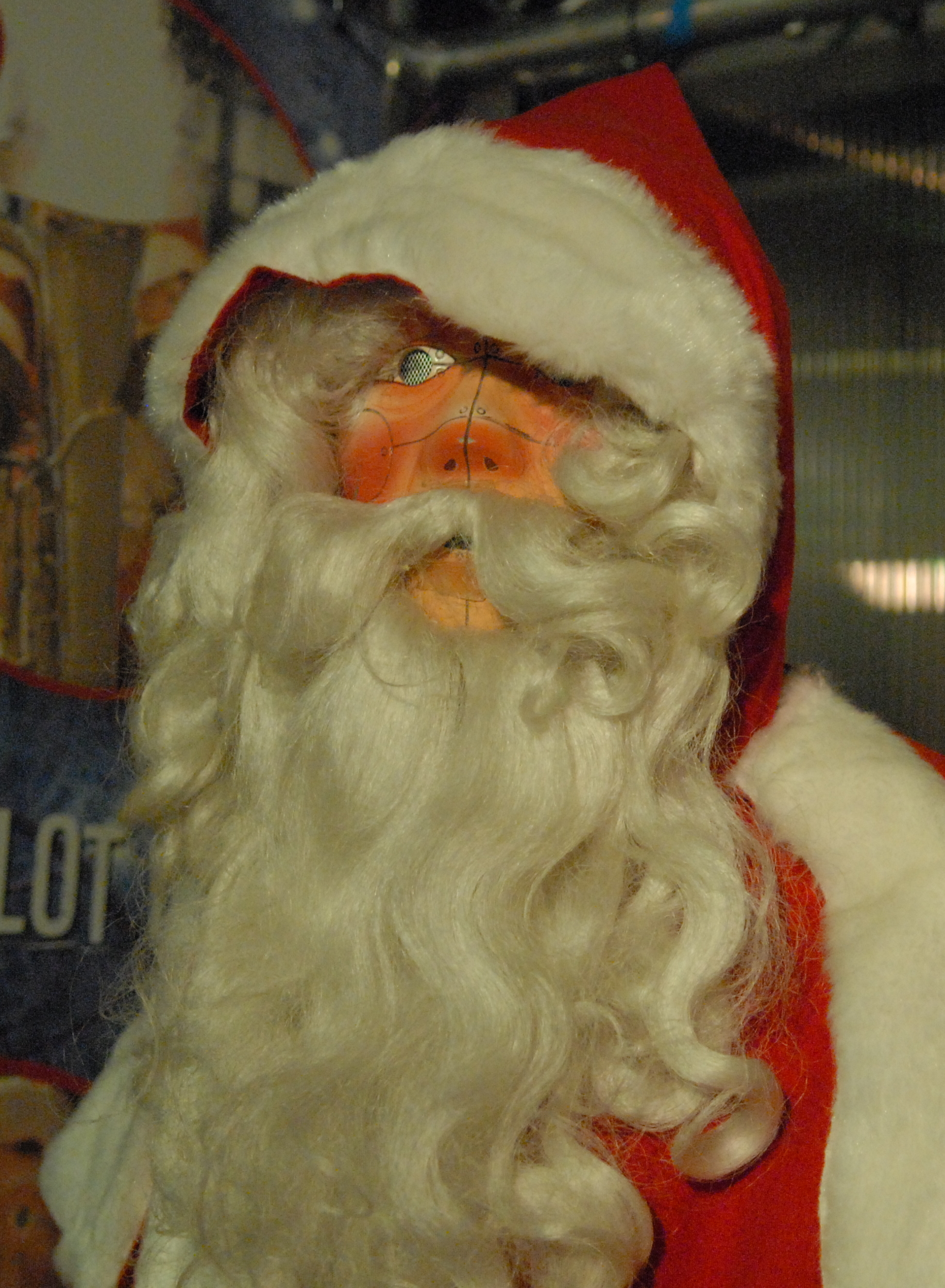
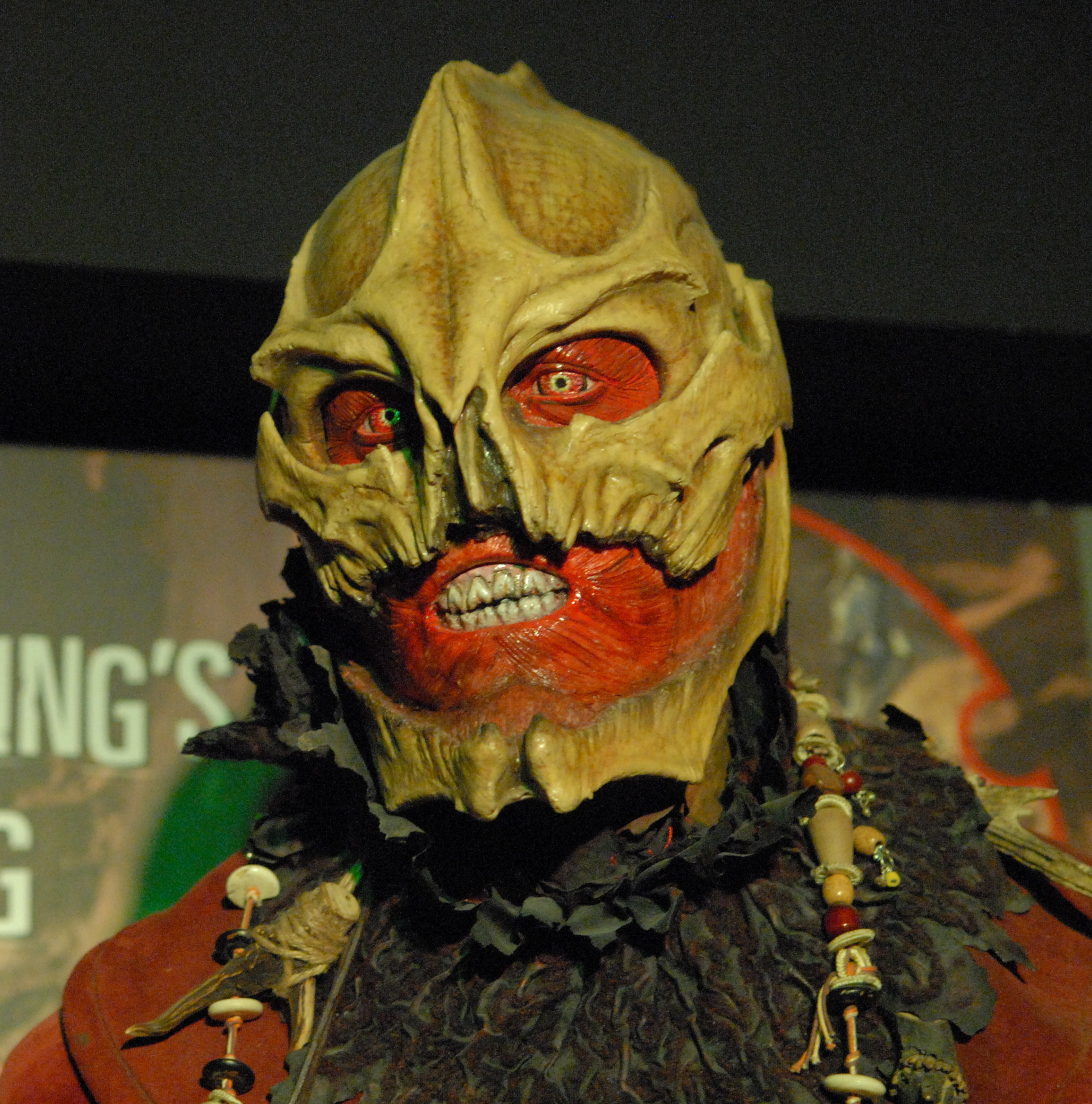
The Pilot Fish Robot Santa (top) and the Sycorax Leader (bottom) as they appear on display at the Doctor Who Experience

The newly regenerated Tenth Doctor takes Rose back to her old estate, and collapses in front of Mickey and Jackie. They take the Doctor to Jackie's flat, where they put him to bed. Mickey and Rose go Christmas shopping, but are attacked by robot Father Christmases using flamethrowers disguised as trombones. The couple get a taxi back to her home where they discover a new, unfamiliar Christmas tree, which starts spinning with razor-sharp blades. Rose, Mickey and Jackie shelter in the comatose Doctor's bedroom. The Doctor wakes up and destroys the homicidal tree with his sonic screwdriver, before again losing consciousness.

Early on Christmas morning, the British-launched Mars space probe Guinevere One is intercepted by a giant spaceship heading for Earth. When the probe's broadcast is shown on Earth, the face of a Sycorax appears. He uses blood control to cause a third of the world's population to go into a hypnotic state and threatens to make these people jump to their deaths from high buildings unless half of the world's population is given to them as slaves. Harriet Jones, the Prime Minister, attempts further negotiations with the Sycorax, and is teleported aboard the ship.

Rose, Mickey and Jackie evacuate the Doctor to the TARDIS as the Sycorax ship approaches London. The TARDIS is detected by the Sycorax and is teleported aboard their ship, but Jackie is left behind. Rose buys enough time for the Doctor to finally recover. The Doctor shuts down the Sycorax blood control and then challenges the leader to a sword duel for the Earth. The leader severs the Doctor's hand, which he immediately re-grows due to leftover regeneration energy. The Sycorax leader submits, but then attempts to attack from behind. The Doctor hits a button with a satsuma he found, triggering part of the wing to fold and dropping the leader to his death.

The Doctor orders the Sycorax to leave Earth and never return, before taking the humans back to Earth. As the Sycorax ship moves away, Harriet orders Torchwood to destroy the ship. The Doctor becomes furious, threatens to bring down Harriet's government with 6 words, before whispering to her aide: "Don't you think she looks tired?"

After choosing a new outfit, the Doctor joins Rose, Jackie, and Mickey for Christmas dinner. They watch Harriet on television fending off rumours about her health, with a vote of no confidence looming.

== Production ==
=== Writing ===
The Christmas special is a tradition in British television series, and while this is the first story for Doctor Who clearly labelled as a Christmas special, the seventh episode of The Daleks' Master Plan, titled "The Feast of Steven", was written as a Christmas episode, even featuring a fourth wall–breaking Christmas wish to the viewers by William Hartnell. Christmas specials became an annual staple for Doctor Who, until 2018, where it was replaced by a New Year's special. Although not shown at Christmas, "The Unquiet Dead" was set on Christmas Eve, 1869.

The production of the special, along with the entirety of the second series, began before the broadcast of the first series, and therefore none of Davies' team knew if the script would ever see production. Davies wished to have an adversary having a prosthetic face while retaining the actor's actual eyes and mouth; he also stated that he had always found the idea of Santa, "an old man creeping into children's rooms at night", creepy. As a result, the enemies fought included the alien Sycorax, as well as murderous robot Santas. Seeking also to endear Tennant's Doctor to those who had grown to attached to the Ninth Doctor, he brought back Harriet Jones as Prime Minister, a future event that the Doctor had mentioned in "World War Three".

=== Filming ===
The episode shared a production block with the first two episodes of the next series, with primary filming for the special taking place between 22 July and 19 August. Additional shots were filmed sporadically in the lead-up to the special in September-November, along with the required CGI effects.

The episode's opening shot is a repeat of the opening shot of "Rose". The cone-shaped building which has all its glass blown out from the ship's shockwave is 30 St Mary Axe, also known as the Swiss Re Building or "The Gherkin". The climactic scenes of the episode were shot on location at Wallis House, Brentford, one of the Golden Mile's few remaining Art Deco buildings, and parts of the episode were filmed at the Clearwell Caves in Gloucestershire.

The Tenth Doctor speaks with an Estuary English accent, in contrast to the Ninth Doctor's Northern one. In a 23 December interview on BBC Radio 1, Tennant explained that a line had been scripted for the Christmas special explaining that the newly regenerated Doctor had imprinted on Rose's accent, "like a chick hatching from an egg," but the line was cut from the final programme.

=== Casting ===
This special was the first full episode to star David Tennant as the Tenth Doctor; he appeared only briefly at the end of "The Parting of the Ways" for the regeneration sequence. His costume was chosen just before filming began, one more casual and lighter, contrasted with Converse shoes and a long coat with a lot of fingers, because Tennant likes to play about with his costume in what he terms "pocket acting". Penelope Wilton returned as Harriet Jones, as a means to add continuity between the two Doctors. A fan of her character, Wilton begged that Jones not be brought down at the end of the episode but the script remained unchanged.

Noel Clarke and Camille Coduri also returned as Mickey Smith and Jackie Tyler respectively. They were both set to appear in many episodes in the second series, so as soon as the success of the first series seemed assured, their contracts for the second series were drawn up. It was also confirmed at the BAFTA preview of the series one finale that Billie Piper would return for the Christmas Special and all 13 episodes of the second series.

=== Promotion ===
Trailers for the special first appeared on 26 October on BBC One. A 7-minute "mini-episode", set between "The Parting of the Ways" and "The Christmas Invasion", was shown as part of the Children in Need charity telethon on 18 November 2005. Interviews with the cast and crew followed up during the next month: such as Tennant's on ITV1 on 13 December, and Davies' with the Sunday Herald on 19 December.

On 3 December 2005, the annual Christmas edition of the BBC's listings magazine Radio Times was released, featuring a Doctor Who cover to tie in with the special. This was the first time Doctor Who had featured on the Christmas edition cover in the show's forty-two-year history, and the first Christmas cover for an individual BBC television drama since EastEnders in 1986; the Christmas Radio Times cover usually features artwork of a generic Christmas scene, with Doctor Who being the first one featured in 16 years. Russell T Davies later confirmed in the episode commentary that the Doctor Who section of the issue contained a hidden message explaining what saves the Doctor: many of the paragraphs in the articles have an oversized first letter, which taken consecutively spell out "A cup of tea".

During the live broadcast, the front page of the official BBC website stated: "THE CHRISTMAS INVASION is on BBC One NOW. HARRIET JONES SAYS: Switch this website off for Britain." The tie-in website "Who is Doctor Who?" was also updated with a message from Mickey referencing the Guinevere One website, and an appeal to the Doctor to bring back Rose.

=== Music ===
The song playing during the wardrobe sequence, "Song for Ten" (named in reference to the Tenth Doctor), was composed by Murray Gold for the episode and sung by Tim Phillips. The closing credits had a new theme arrangement restoring the traditional "middle eight" section of the theme, which had been omitted in the 2005 series. This was performed by the BBC National Orchestra of Wales, conducted by Gold. This arrangement was subsequently used for the closing titles of the 2006 series.

Various pieces of music featured in this episode were released in December 2006 as part of the Doctor Who Soundtrack (produced by Silva Screen). These included the "Song for Ten", the music played behind Harriet Jones' speech and the music played as the spaceship arrives over London.

== Broadcast and reception ==
It was broadcast on Christmas Day on BBC1, the first episode to debut on Sunday. The Canadian presentation on the CBC on 26 December 2005 was hosted by Piper, attired for the occasion in a red Roots "Canada" sweatshirt. She gave a special introduction to the episode, which was scheduled in a 90-minute-long slot. It premiered on BBC America in 2007, but was edited down to fit inside a one-hour timeslot with commercial breaks.

=== Ratings ===
Overnight ratings for the episode gave a peak viewing audience of 9.8 million viewers, and an average of 9.4 – the second highest rated programme of the evening, behind EastEnders, and only the 12th time the show had been top 10 for the week. This episode was the highest-rated episode of the Tenth Doctor era, with final ratings at 9.84 million, up until the "Voyage of the Damned", which achieved an audience of 13.8 million viewers.

=== Reception ===
The performance of Tennant was praised, especially how he so quickly "endears" the Doctor when he wakes up and "takes control of the plot", defusing the threat that "had griped the humans for hours in a matter of minutes". "The ferocity and fear" arising from the "power and voice", that terrified the humans is shown to dissipate the moment the Sycorax language is translated, a sign that "the Doctor has woken up". Piper's performance was also praised, in "shouldering the episode", and encapsulating the "terror and helplessness" that the human race faces when the Doctor is indisposed, and "their resilience".

The episode was characterised as one of many of Davies' attempts at "epic", being full of "big speeches and big emotions". Neither the Doctor's monologue about not knowing who he is and or the Sycorax defining him as Earth's champion, nor Rose's emotional breakdown when she thinks the Doctor has abandoned her were considered subtle. Even so, A.V Club's Alasdair Wilkins still called it a solid episode, achieving "the best of what it aspires to be", and Radio Times's Patrick Mulkern giving it a perfect score of 5 stars, finding that it mixed "the impact of the story" and "the jolly nature of the day" perfectly.

It is considered one of the best Christmas specials of the show. In 2014, more than 7,000 readers of Radio Times voted "The Christmas Invasion" as the greatest Doctor Who Christmas special with around a quarter of the votes going to it, 24.92%, a whole 10% more votes than the second favourite.

== Commercial releases ==
=== Home media ===
This episode was released together with "New Earth" as a basic DVD with no special features on 1 May 2006, and as part of a second series boxset on 20 November 2006. This release included an in-vision commentary with Russell T Davies, Julie Gardner (Head of Drama for BBC Wales) and Phil Collinson, recorded before the story aired. This commentary was also made available as an MP3 on the BBC Doctor Who website.

The ten Christmas specials between "The Christmas Invasion" and "Last Christmas" inclusive were released in a boxset titled Doctor Who – The 10 Christmas Specials on 19 October 2015. The episode was also included as part of the "Christopher Eccleston and David Tennant" box set in 2018, containing this episode and all other episodes of the era, plus hours of DVD extras like documentaries, commentaries and more.

=== In print ===
The Christmas Invasion
- Author: Jenny T. Colgan
- Cover artist: Anthony Dry
- Series: Doctor Who book: Target novelisations
- Publisher: BBC Books
- Publication date: 5 April 2018
- Pages: 169
- ISBN: 978-1-785-94328-7

A novelisation of this story written by Jenny T. Colgan including the storyline from the 2005 Children in Need special was released in paperback and digital formats 5 April 2018 as part of the Target Collection.

== See also ==
- List of fictional prime ministers of the United Kingdom
