= Voyage of the Damned (Doctor Who) =

188 – "Voyage of the Damned"
- Doctor Who episode
- The interstellar liner Titanic, a replica of the Titanic and the main setting of the episode, orbits above the Earth.

Cast
- Doctor: David Tennant – Tenth Doctor
- Companion: Kylie Minogue – Astrid Peth
- Others: Geoffrey Palmer – Captain Hardaker; Russell Tovey – Midshipman Frame; George Costigan – Max Capricorn; Gray O'Brien – Rickston Slade; Andrew Havill – Chief Steward; Bruce Lawrence – Engineer; Debbie Chazen – Foon Van Hoff; Clive Rowe – Morvin Van Hoff; Clive Swift – Mr Copper; Jimmy Vee – Bannakaffalatta; Bernard Cribbins – Wilfred Mott; Nicholas Witchell – Himself; Paul Kasey – The Host; Stefan Davis – Kitchen Hand; Jason Mohammad – Newsreader; Colin McFarlane, Ewan Bailey – Alien voices; Jessica Martin – Voice of The Queen

Production
- Directed by: James Strong
- Written by: Russell T Davies
- Produced by: Phil Collinson
- Executive producers: Russell T Davies; Julie Gardner
- Music by: Murray Gold
- Production code: 4.X
- Running time: 72 minutes
- First broadcast: 25 December 2007

Chronology
← Preceded by "Last of the Time Lords"	Followed by → "Partners in Crime"

"Voyage of the Damned" is an episode of the British science fiction television programme Doctor Who. First broadcast on BBC One on 25 December 2007, it is the third Doctor Who Christmas special since the show's revival in 2005. The episode was written by Russell T Davies and directed by James Strong.

In the episode, the alien businessman Max Capricorn (George Costigan) seeks revenge on his company after it votes him out. He sets a starship replica of the Titanic on a collision course with Earth to frame the board of directors for killing the humans on Earth. The episode features the only performance in Doctor Who by the Australian singer and actress Kylie Minogue, who plays the waitress Astrid Peth. Davies described her casting as a "very exceptional case", having written the part of Astrid specifically for Minogue. She is a one-off companion of the Tenth Doctor who appears just in this episode. Minogue's casting in the role was a major coup for Doctor Who, her fame attracting much publicity for the episode. Subsequently, much of the episode's success in terms of viewing figures was attributed to Minogue's appearance in the role.

On its original airdate Christmas 2007, "Voyage of the Damned" was watched by 13.31 million viewers, the highest viewing figure for Doctor Who since the 1979 serial City of Death and still the highest viewership of any episode since the show's revival. It was the second most-watched programme of 2007, beaten only by the episode of EastEnders which aired immediately after it. Critical opinion about the episode was divided; the writing and Minogue's performance were both praised and criticised.

== Plot ==
The TARDIS has collided with a ship called the Titanic. To investigate further, the Tenth Doctor runs the TARDIS's self-repair programme and boards the Titanic, which the Doctor discovers is an interstellar cruiser from the planet Sto. Modelled after the Earth ocean liner Titanic, the ship is orbiting present-day Earth to observe "primitive cultures"—specifically, Christmas. The Doctor decides to stow away, and joins a party of aliens including the waitress Astrid Peth on a brief excursion to London. However, the populace of London fled in fear because of extraterrestrial attacks over the previous two Christmases.

After the party return from the excursion, the ship's captain, Hardaker, sabotages the ship by engineering its collision with three meteors. The resulting collision kills most of the passengers on board and draws the ship to an extinction level collision with Earth. The Doctor makes contact with Midshipman Frame, a crew member who survived the collision, to help him stabilise the ship. En route to the bridge, the Doctor's party are repeatedly attacked by the Host, androids resembling angels who were programmed to kill the survivors. The Doctor breaks from the party and attempts to reach the control point for the Host. He is taken to the Host's leader, former cruise line owner Max Capricorn, who is a head attached to a mobile life support unit. Capricorn was bitter about being forced out of his own company and plotted the Titanic's inevitable collision with Earth to bankrupt the company by framing the board of directors for murder; the terminally ill Captain Hardaker's part was secured by promising financial support for his family. To save the Doctor, Astrid rams Capricorn with a forklift, which sends both of them over a ledge to their deaths in the engine.

The Doctor uses the Host to reach the bridge, where he uses the heat from entry into the Earth's atmosphere to restart the ship's engines. After stabilising the ship, the Doctor realises that the teleport bracelet Astrid was wearing backed up her molecular pattern. However, the damaged system can only partially regenerate Astrid. Astrid reappears spectral and bewildered, as the Doctor gives her a goodbye kiss before freeing her sentient atoms (described as "stardust") to roam space as energy.

== Production ==
=== Casting ===
Clive Swift and Geoffrey Palmer have had previous roles in Doctor Who. Swift portrayed Jobel in Revelation of the Daleks (1985), while Palmer played Undersecretary Masters in Doctor Who and the Silurians (1970), and the Administrator in The Mutants (1972). Jessica Martin had played Mags in The Greatest Show in the Galaxy (1988–89). In addition, Bernard Cribbins played Tom Campbell in Daleks' Invasion Earth 2150 A.D., the second Doctor Who feature-film adaptation starring Peter Cushing as well as Arnold Korns in the audio play Horror of Glam Rock. Colin McFarlane, who provided the voices of the Heavenly Host for the episode, went on to play General Pierce in Torchwood: Children of Earth (2009), before later reappearing in Doctor Who as Moran in "Under the Lake". Russell Tovey plays Midshipman Frame, a role he would briefly reprise in The End of Time. Tovey and McFarlane would appear in The War Between the Land and the Sea (2025) in which Tovey played Barclay Pierre-Dupont and McFarlane reprised General Pierce from Torchwood: Children of Earth.

Jimmy Vee had previously played aliens in "The End of the World" and "Aliens of London" (2005), and would later play other aliens in "The End of Time" (2009–10) and "The Caretaker" (2014).

==== Kylie Minogue ====
During the third series press launch in March 2007, the production team was approached by William Baker, Kylie Minogue's creative director, about her appearing in the show. Executive producer Julie Gardner replied that Minogue could guest star if her schedule was free. Minogue officially registered her interest on 26 March 2007 and was subsequently given a one-off role as the Doctor's companion. Minogue's appearance would allow the show to easily transfer the lead companion role from Martha Jones (Freema Agyeman) to "Penny"—the intended companion for the fourth series, eventually replaced by Catherine Tate as Donna Noble—and provide a "big name" star to appear in the Christmas special.

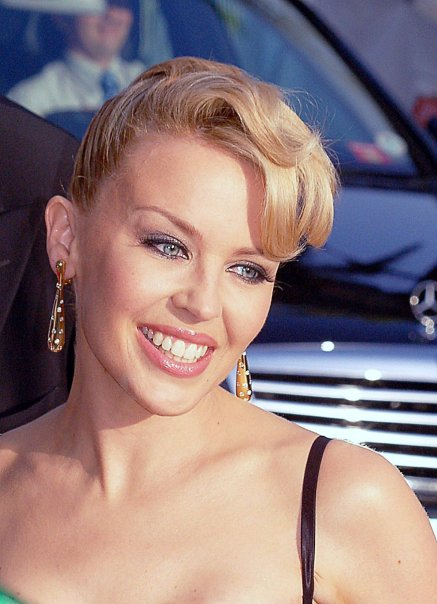
Australian singer Kylie Minogue (pictured in 2007) portrayed Astrid Peth, a role written especially for her.

Her casting was first reported in the News of the World in April 2007. Davies initially dismissed the story, but Baker and Minogue contemporaneously confirmed she would star in the show. Her role was officially confirmed on 3 July 2007. Both Minogue and Doctor Who had acknowledged each other before: "The Idiot's Lantern" mentions Minogue as a real person; and Baker, a fan of Doctor Who, included aspects of the classic series in Minogue's tours: the Raston Warriors (from "The Five Doctors") in the KylieFever2002 tour; and the Cybermen in the Showgirl: Homecoming Tour.

The BBC officially announced that Minogue was to feature as Astrid in the episode "Voyage of the Damned" on 3 July 2007. The official announcement followed rumours regarding Minogue's casting having already circulated in the press, although the episode's writer Russell T Davies had denied these rumours in in-house BBC publication Ariel in an attempt to keep the news secret for longer. Furthermore, Minogue herself had confirmed that she would be appearing in the episode in InStyle magazine, whilst the London paper Standard Lite published a photograph of Minogue's creative director Will Baker carrying a 'to do list' with a note about a Doctor Who script on it, thus indicating that Minogue would be in the episode. Minogue had also been sighted filming for Doctor Who by members of the public before the official announcement of her casting. Baker, a long-term Doctor Who fan, was largely responsible for Minogue's casting by setting up a meeting between her, Davies and Julie Gardner. Davies has claimed that Minogue was keen to appear on Doctor Who to relaunch her acting career.

Minogue met designer Louise Page four times during pre-production to discuss her costume. Page rejected a long dress because it was atypical to Minogue; she instead elected for a "cigarette girl" image, similar to a "1950s [...] cinema usherette". Five costumes were made for different scenes and Minogue's stunt doubles, and each part of each costume was made separately to keep Minogue's role secret. After filming, Minogue told Page that the costume was "the most comfortable [she] had worn in years".

=== Writing ===
In August 2007, screenwriter and executive producer Russell T Davies announced that Astrid Peth would be the next companion, following the positive reception towards Martha Jones, (played by Freema Agyeman). Astrid's surname, Peth, was confirmed in the Christmas edition of Radio Times. Davies has stated that the character was always going to be a "one-off" even before Minogue was cast and that Astrid would demonstrate "a whole new take – again – on what a companion can be". The name Astrid Peth generated some speculation before the episode's broadcast over the findings that Astrid is an anagram of TARDIS, and that Peth means thing in Welsh. However, the episode established no such connection. On Doctor Who Confidential, Minogue describes Astrid as a "dreamer" and that meeting with the Doctor rekindles Astrid's desire to explore. Later in his book A Writer's Tale Davies discussed with co-author Benjamin Cook how he had originally named the character "Peth" in a treatment but it bugged him, he later renamed her to "Astrid" giving the reason that it "...sounds more spacey, more like a futuristing [sic] Doctor's companion".

Despite Davies stating that the companion in "Voyage of the Damned" was "always going to [be] a one-off...little knowing that it would be Kylie Minogue", he has since stated that he would cast Minogue again "like that". In 2008 The Daily Express quoted Minogue as saying there had been talk that her character could be reintroduced at a later date. Davies refused to comment when Doctor Who Magazine asked him about the rumours regarding Minogue's return to Doctor Who.

The episode was primarily written by Russell T Davies after Minogue was cast. Davies described his pitch to Minogue as "busking". The character of Astrid Peth was written for Minogue. Davies later stated that Minogue was a "very exceptional case"; he considered writing a role specifically for one actor "dangerous territory" because the desired actor may be unavailable or decline the part. In early drafts of the episode, Astrid did not die. Davies decided Astrid's death was necessary to allow Minogue to focus on her musical career. Davies described the original nature of her death—falling over a precipice during a fight with Capricorn—as "fleeting". He intensified the scene by changing Max from mobile to cybernetic and Astrid's attack from an altercation to a fork-lift truck. Davies felt the revised scene was "such a beautiful image" and romanticised Astrid's "ultimate sacrifice".

Davies based the episode on the traditional disaster film format. He was highly influenced by the 1972 film The Poseidon Adventure: he considered "[turning] the spaceship upside down" before cutting the concept for monetary constraints; and the character of Foon Van Hoff (Debbie Chazen) was heavily based on Belle Rosen (Shelley Winters). He diverged from the trope in its climax; the format of Doctor Who dictated the requirement of an antagonist: Max Capricorn, whose plan was to sabotage the ship as part of an insurance scam. Davies based the portrayal of Sto on Kansas in the 1939 film The Wizard of Oz.

The episode includes several external references: the episode is dedicated to Verity Lambert, Doctor Who's founding producer, who died on 22 November 2007, a day before the show's forty-fourth anniversary; and the malfunctioning Host stuttering over the name "Max" is a reference to 1980s virtual presenter Max Headroom; Davies inserted references to other Doctor Who episodes in the script: he emphasised society's increasing awareness of aliens and the tradition of London's consecutive Christmas attacks in the script, describing the latter as "becoming a bit of an in-joke"; the Doctor's use of the catchphrase "allons-y Alonso" in the episode when he helps Frame stabilise the ship continues a running gag originating in "Army of Ghosts"; and the Host continue the thematic motif of angels. Angels previously appeared in "Blink", where the antagonists of the episode were Weeping Angels, and in "The Sound of Drums" and "Last of the Time Lords", where the Master's communication network was called the "Archangel Network". Despite angels being the antagonist in two episodes that aired close to each other, which dismayed writer and executive producer Russell T Davies when he read Steven Moffat's script for "Blink", the Host are functionally different as subordinate "robot butlers".

=== Filming ===
Filming primarily took place between 9 July and 11 August 2007; the first scene filmed depicted the group being accosted by the Host while crossing over the engines. On 12 July, Tennant's mother, Helen McDonald, began to succumb to her cancer. Filming was rescheduled to allow Tennant to be present when she died and was buried—on 15 and 21 July, respectively. During Tennant's absence, scenes in the Titanic's reception area were filmed at the Exchange in Swansea and the Coal Exchange in Cardiff Bay. Tennant filmed his scenes in the area on 16 and 17 July. The last use of the Coal Exchange was on the 18th; scenes depicting the ship's collision with meteors were filmed on that day.

One week of filming was conducted primarily at the old DuPont site in Pontypool which provided the sets for Deck 31—Capricorn's refuge and command centre. Much of the old extrusion machinery still in situ and their corresponding control "Thorn Drive" panels —and the various stairwells and corridors of the ship. Scenes on Deck 31 were filmed on 19 and 20 July. A double, Danielle de Costa, operated the fork-lift truck because Minogue didn't have the required license. Shooting was staggered as a result of Tennant's departure: 21 July focused on the supporting characters; and 23 July focused on Tennant. The aftermath of the meteor strike was filmed between 25 July and 27 July.

Filming returned to the Exchange in Swansea to film two more scenes: the denouément of the episode was filmed on 28 July; and the pre-credits sequence on 30 July. The most important day of filming was on 31 July 2007: an evening location shoot of the party's arrival in London. Before filming commenced, Minogue covered her death scene above a chroma key mattress. The scene in London commenced filming at sunset in Cardiff city centre. For security concerns—specifically, protecting Minogue—the street was sealed off for the first time since the show's revival in 2005.

Filming finished in the first two weeks of August 2007: the closing scene was filmed in Cardiff Docks on 1 August; Hardaker's death was filmed at Upper Boat on 2 August; scenes in the ship's kitchen were filmed on 3 August; and scenes on the bridge were filmed from 6–8 August. The last day of filming was on 21 August 2007; cameo scenes by BBC reporters Jason Mohammad and Nicholas Witchell were filmed at BBC's broadcasting houses in Llandaff and London.

=== Music ===
"The Stowaway"
The chorus of the song "The Stowaway", which was influenced by Irish folk music.

Composer Murray Gold, arranger Ben Foster, and singer Yamit Mamo make cameo appearances as part of the ship's band. Mamo, primarily a soul singer, was approached by Gold after his friends saw her performing, and she unconditionally accepted his offer. She performed the songs "My Angel Put the Devil in Me" and "The Stowaway" on the third series soundtrack. The latter was specifically composed for this episode and was recorded in September 2007 at AIR Studios in London. The song features everyone who was present in the studios during recording as backing vocals. "The Stowaway" continues the tradition of a Christmas song from "The Christmas Invasion" ("Song for Ten") and "The Runaway Bride" ("Love Don't Roam"). The song was influenced by Irish folk music, and contrasts the upbeat "under deck" feeling with melancholy lyrics about unrequited love. A ten-minute suite of the episode's musical score was included on the fourth series soundtrack. The episode also features a new version of the theme tune during its credits, comparable to Peter Howell's version from the 1980s, which contains a new bass line, drums, and piano.

== Promotion ==
Minogue posed with a Dalek in an exclusive photo shoot for Doctor Who Magazine promoting "Voyage of the Damned". The shoot paid homage to actress Katy Manning's (who portrayed Jo Grant) famous nude photo shoot with a Dalek. Tenth Doctor actor David Tennant interviewed Minogue about her role as Astrid Peth on BBC Radio 2 in X-Amining Kylie first broadcast on 27 November 2007. Lengthier discussion about her involvement in "Voyage of the Damned" was included in the extended repeat of X-Amining Kylie, entitled Re-X-Amining Kylie, broadcast on Boxing Day 2007. It was leaked to The Sun and other media outlets that Astrid would kiss the Doctor.

== Broadcast and reception ==
=== Broadcast ===
Overnight figures estimated that the episode's Christmas Day broadcast was watched by 12.2 million viewers. The final viewing figures were 13.31 million viewers with a peak of 13.8 million, the second highest audience for any programme during 2007: the episode of BBC soap EastEnders which aired after "Voyage of the Damned" was watched by 13.9 million viewers. The viewing figure is the highest for the new series, exceeding the previous record set by "Rose". The figure is also the highest for Doctor Who overall since 1979, specifically, the final episode of "City of Death". The episode's Appreciation Index rating was 86 ("excellent"), above the average score of 77 for drama programmes, and was the highest Index rating for any programme shown on terrestrial television on Christmas Day.

Although not filmed in HD, the BBC aired it on BBC One HD, Wednesday 29 December 2010, having up-scaled the programme to HD and also including Dolby Surround sound. This is the first Doctor Who episode, filmed in SD, to have been up-scaled to HD for broadcast on television, and the second episode, overall, to be up-scaled from SD to HD, the first being the 2008 Christmas Special, "The Next Doctor", for the Blu-ray release of the Complete Specials Boxset. This special first aired in Canada on Space in April 2010.

=== Reception ===
The episode was seen by 13.8 million watching at its peak, according to consolidated ratings, when it was first broadcast on Christmas Day on BBC One. The ratings success of "Voyage of the Damned" has been partially and fully attributed to Minogue's casting in the role of Astrid. Younger viewers who were fans of pop star Kylie were left distraught by Astrid's death and had to be convinced that Kylie was not dead in real life.

Although reviewer Jane Simon would have liked to have seen more of the character and it has been asserted that her appearance in the episode has helped her make "a full return to the limelight", Minogue's appearance was not universally praised. Gareth McLean, a TV writer for The Guardian, described Minogue as "not that good...she's blank and insipid". McLean wrote:

There's no chemistry between Astrid and the Doctor, she delivers her lines with a real lack of conviction and thus we never really believe in Astrid as a character. Where Catherine Tate's Donna in last year's special was overbearing, Kylie Minogue's Astrid is hardly there at all. It does make you wonder why casting Kylie was regarded as a coup. She's a pop star – of course she's going to say yes to being beamed into millions of homes in the run-up to Christmas. She's got a duff album to sell. In truth, Kylie should be grateful to [Doctor Who].

David Belcher of The Herald wrote that Minogue looked too old to play a waitress. Sam Wollaston of The Guardian claimed Kylie's performance was "disappointing" and did not live up to those of Freema Agyeman or Billie Piper in Doctor Who. Jim Shelley of The Mirror stated that Minogue did not "look vivacious enough to be worth all the fuss". Conversely, Paddy Shennan of the Liverpool Echo accused the makers of cynically including shots of Minogue's cleavage and legs. Tim Teeman of the Times Online described Astrid as "gutsy", but commented on Minogue's "older" appearance and likened her "breathy delivery" to her performance as Charlene Mitchell in Neighbours. In 2012, Will Salmon of SFX named Astrid's demise as one of the five worst companion departures, writing that her death circumstance was "a bit daft" and her starlight farewell was a "laughably mawkish scene".

Billie Piper, who portrayed former companion Rose Tyler, commented that it was a "great idea" to cast Minogue, and was disappointed to miss meeting and befriending her on the set of Doctor Who as Tennant had done.

Character Options has produced an action figure of Astrid for inclusion in a "Voyage of the Damned" action figure box set.

=== Criticism and review ===
A scene where the Doctor was lifted by the angelic Host to the ship's bridge was both criticised and praised for its religious imagery.

The episode was criticised by Millvina Dean, the last survivor of the sinking of the Titanic, who said: "The Titanic was a tragedy which tore so many families apart. I lost my father and he lies on that wreck. I think it is disrespectful to make entertainment of such a tragedy." A spokeswoman for the show said: "No offence was intended. 'Voyage of the Damned' is set on a spaceship called The Titanic and not a boat." The organisation Christian Voice expressed offence at the religious imagery of a scene in which the Doctor is lifted through the ship by robot angels, believing the messianic portrayal of the Doctor as "inappropriate".

Gareth McLean, who reviewed a preview screening for The Guardian, appreciated the episode's use of "the disaster movie template" and came to a favourable overall conclusion: "For the most part, The Voyage of the Damned is absolutely smashing." Its main flaw, in his view, was the "blank and insipid" acting of Kylie Minogue. James Walton of The Daily Telegraph gave the episode a positive review, summarising it as "a winning mixture of wild imagination and careful writerly calculation". Alex Clark of The Observer commented that the death toll was rather high, but she still thought the episode was "an oasis of cheeky nonsense and careless invention". Harry Venning of The Stage concluded his positive review of the episode by stating it "was well up to Doctor Who's impeccably high standards". Doctor Who Magazine placed two of the deaths in the episode in its list of the top 100 deaths in the history of the show. Bannakaffalatta's death, a self-sacrifice to save the Doctor's party, was placed in the "top 20 tearjerkers" category. Astrid's death was given the title of "Doctor Who's all-time greatest death scene", commenting it "ticks boxes in all of our main categories [(gruesome, scary, self-sacrifice, tearjerking, surprising)]", and "her death would truly make a glass eye cry." Tim Teeman of The Times gave the episode a negative review, stating that "It was boring, despite the endless dashing about and CGI flimflam." The Daily Mirror commented the episode had "some brilliant psychedelic Pink Floyd-esque imagery", "great baddies", and "neat jokes", but lamented that "the plot was a mess, consisting mostly of one hi-tech chase scene after another, and it descended into noise and bluster."

=== Later media ===
The episode was first released in the UK on DVD in March 2008. The ten Christmas specials between "The Christmas Invasion" and "Last Christmas" inclusive were later released in a boxset titled Doctor Who – The 10 Christmas Specials on 19 October 2015.

In the 2013 novel Shroud of Sorrow, the Shroud, the main antagonist of the book, takes the form of deceased loved ones known to the people it approaches, in a bid to entice and entrap them. For the Eleventh Doctor, it takes the form of Astrid. The Doctor later uses a 'Once More With Feeling' device to revisit memories of losing friends, including Astrid's death, to generate enough personal grief that the Shroud releases its victims and latches on to him.
