= The Parting of the Ways =

166b – "The Parting of the Ways"
- Doctor Who episode

Cast
- Doctor: Christopher Eccleston – Ninth Doctor
- Companions: Billie Piper – Rose Tyler; John Barrowman – Jack Harkness
- Others: Jo Stone-Fewings – Male Programmer; Jo Joyner – Lynda Moss; Paterson Joseph – Rodrick; Nisha Nayar – Female Programmer; Noel Clarke – Mickey Smith; Camille Coduri – Jackie Tyler; Anne Robinson – Voice of Anne Droid; Nicholas Briggs – Dalek Voice; Barnaby Edwards, Nicholas Pegg, David Hankinson – Dalek Operators; Alan Ruscoe – Android; Jenna Russell – Floor Manager (uncredited); David Tennant – Tenth Doctor

Production
- Directed by: Joe Ahearne
- Written by: Russell T Davies
- Produced by: Phil Collinson
- Executive producers: Russell T Davies; Julie Gardner; Mal Young
- Music by: Murray Gold
- Production code: 1.13
- Series: Series 1
- Running time: 2nd of 2-part story, 45 minutes
- First broadcast: 18 June 2005

Chronology
← Preceded by "Bad Wolf"	Followed by → "The Christmas Invasion"

"The Parting of the Ways" is the thirteenth and final episode of the revived first series of the British science fiction television programme Doctor Who. The episode was first broadcast on BBC One on 18 June 2005. It was the second episode of a two-part story. The first part, "Bad Wolf", was broadcast on 11 June.

In the episode, the Dalek race invades the human satellite Satellite Five in the year 200,100, intending to make more Daleks by harvesting dead humans. The alien time traveller the Ninth Doctor (Christopher Eccleston) plans to use the satellite's transmitter to try to destroy every Dalek, while at the same time sending his travelling companion Rose Tyler (Billie Piper) home to keep her safe.

The episode featured Eccleston making his final appearance as the Ninth Doctor and marks the first appearance of David Tennant as the Tenth Doctor.

== Plot ==
The Ninth Doctor pilots the TARDIS to rescue Rose from the Daleks. The Doctor discovers that the Dalek Emperor survived the Time War and that it rebuilt the Dalek race by harvesting DNA material from kidnapped humans over the centuries. These Daleks, driven insane by their own genetic impurity, have developed a concept of blasphemy and worship the Emperor as a god. The Doctor, Rose and Jack escape, disgusted.

Returning to the top floor of Satellite Five, the Doctor attempts to create a device known as a "Delta Wave", which will destroy the Daleks, but also all life on Earth. Jack manages to delay the Daleks from reaching the Doctor. The Doctor tricks Rose into going inside the TARDIS, and remotely directs the TARDIS to return Rose to her home time to keep her safe, asking her to abandon the TARDIS and forget about him. The Daleks invade the station, killing everyone in their path.

Rose grows despondent at being trapped on Earth while the Doctor fights the Daleks. She notices the words "Bad Wolf", words which also exist on Satellite Five, on her estate, and realises that they are a message, rather than a warning, telling her to return to the future. She convinces her boyfriend Mickey and mother Jackie to help her open the heart of the TARDIS. Mickey uses a truck borrowed by Jackie to pull the panel on the console open, and light from the heart of the TARDIS, known as the Time Vortex, passes into Rose's body.

In the future, the Daleks reach the top of Satellite Five, killing Jack and Lynda in the process. The Doctor cannot bring himself to activate the Delta Wave, but before the Daleks can kill the Doctor, Rose arrives in the TARDIS, having absorbed tremendous powers from the Time Vortex. She spreads the words "Bad Wolf" throughout time and space as a message to lead herself there. Rose disintegrates the Dalek fleet, killing the Emperor, and resurrects Jack. To save her life, the Doctor absorbs Rose's powers from her, causing him to start dying. He and an unconscious Rose leave in the TARDIS before Jack can get back to them. Inside the TARDIS, the Doctor regenerates into his tenth incarnation.

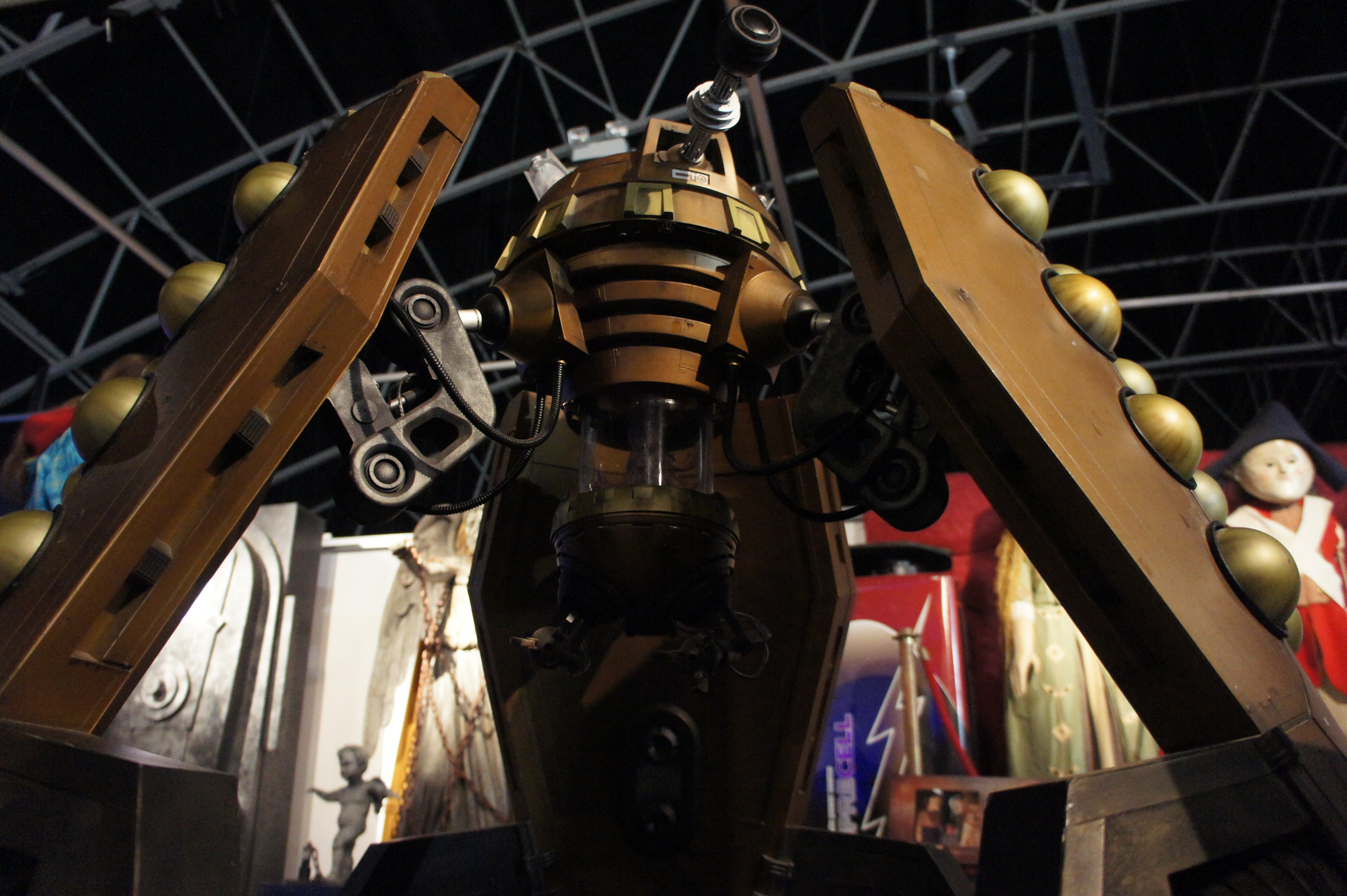
The Emperor Dalek, as shown at the Doctor Who Experience.

== Production ==
This was the first episode in this series which was not given a press screening prior to the broadcast. Radio Times stated, "No preview tape was available for this episode." The episode was, however, screened for BAFTA on 15 June 2005.

According to Russell T Davies in Doctor Who Magazine, Jack was left behind because they wanted to explore the effects of the regeneration on Rose (noting that Jack would have taken the regeneration "in his stride"). Jack returned in the Doctor Who spin-off series Torchwood, which began broadcasting in October 2006. In an interview in Doctor Who Magazine, Russell T Davies stated that an alternate ending for this episode was written and filmed, with the intention that it would be shown to press previewers to hide the secret of the regeneration. The "false" ending would have featured similar dialogue to the televised final scene, but the TARDIS would have scanned Rose and the viewers would have seen the display read: "LIFEFORM DYING". Davies considered this scene inferior to the one actually shown but suggested that it might be suitable as an extra on a DVD someday. On the DVD commentary, executive producer Julie Gardner and Billie Piper briefly discuss this ending, which Gardner describes as featuring Rose's death; unlike Davies, Gardner expresses doubts that it will be issued on DVD (it was not included in the Series 1 DVD set).

The main recording on the series concluded on 14 March 2005.

The Doctor claims that he is known in Dalek legend as "the Oncoming Storm", a title that first appeared in the Virgin New Adventures novel Love and War by Paul Cornell (who wrote the episode "Father's Day"). In the novel, the title was applied to the Doctor by the Draconians.

Eccleston's planned departure was leaked early by the BBC on 30 March 2005. They claimed that he was scared of being typecast. On 4 April, they admitted that this statement had been made without consulting the actor, and were forced to apologise. In 2010, Eccleston denied the typecast claim, explaining that he was not comfortable in the working environment. He later stated that he could not get along with some of the "senior people". According to the Sunday Mirror, an interview for BBC's Doctor Who website that was taken down after his departure was announced revealed that Eccleston had planned to stay for two or three more years. David Tennant was offered the role whilst watching a pre-transmission copy of Casanova with Davies and Gardner. Though Tennant initially believed the offer was a joke, he accepted the role after he realised they were serious and was announced as Eccleston's replacement on 16 April 2005.

Tennant's portion of the regeneration scene was actually filmed much later than Eccleston's and without the presence of Billie Piper. Tennant's segment was recorded with him speaking to a piece of sticky tape indicating Piper's eyeline and then edited into the broadcast version. It was recorded on 21 April 2005.

== Broadcast and reception ==
"The Parting of the Ways" received overnight ratings of 6.2 million viewers, a 42% audience share and the most-watched programme of the night. When final consolidated ratings were calculated, figures rose to 6.91 million. The episode was broadcast in the United States on the Sci Fi Channel on 9 June 2006. The episode received an Audience Appreciation Index score of 89.

Digital Spy's Dek Hogan wrote that the finale was "something of an anti climax", with the Bad Wolf resolution being a "let down" and the regeneration "a bit rushed" and "lacking in the sort of emotional tension that has been one of this series hallmarks". SFX gave "The Parting of the Ways" a score of nine out of ten, calling the two-parter Davies' "finest work this season", especially praising the emotional moments. However, he felt that two aspects of "The Parting of the Ways" let the story down: the Bad Wolf resolution and the deus ex machina of Rose's transformation. Patrick Mulkern of Radio Times praised the episode, stating that it was "inventive, gripping entertainment" and that "for the first time, Doctor Who has a proper, exhilarating season finale." Alasdair Wilkins of io9 praised the "mad energy" of the two-parter but felt the Dalek plan was "convoluted and a whole bunch of seemingly important stuff ... is brushed aside in the rush to the Doctor's big moral dilemma". Wilkins also pointed out that the story had to deal with Eccleston's abrupt departure, and as a result there was little thematic build-up and the regeneration feels "bolted on to the rest of the story". Despite this, Wilkins ranked it the best regeneration and the third best regeneration story (as of 2010).
