= Doctor Who series 1 =

2005 season of British sci-fi TV series

Doctor Who
- Series 1
- DVD box set cover art
- Showrunner: Russell T Davies
- Starring: Christopher Eccleston; Billie Piper
- No. of stories: 10
- No. of episodes: 13

Release
- Original network: BBC One
- Original release: 26 March – 18 June 2005

Season chronology
- ← Previous; Season 26 (season); Doctor Who (film) Next → Series 2

The first series of the 2005 revival of the British science fiction programme Doctor Who, and the twenty-seventh season overall, began on 26 March 2005 with the episode "Rose". This marked the end of the programme's 16-year absence from episodic television following its cancellation in 1989, and the first new televised Doctor Who story since the broadcast of the television movie starring Paul McGann in 1996. The finale episode, "The Parting of the Ways", was broadcast on 18 June 2005. The show was revived by longtime Doctor Who fan Russell T Davies, who had been lobbying the BBC since the late 1990s to bring the show back. The first series comprised thirteen episodes, eight of which Davies wrote. Davies, Julie Gardner, and Mal Young served as executive producers, Phil Collinson as producer.

The show depicts the adventures of a mysterious and eccentric Time Lord known as the Doctor, who travels through time and space in his time machine, the TARDIS, which normally appears from the exterior to be a blue 1950s British police box. With his companions, he explores time and space, faces a variety of foes, and saves civilisations, helping people and righting wrongs.

The first series features Christopher Eccleston as the ninth incarnation of the Doctor, his only series in the role, accompanied by Billie Piper, as his companion Rose Tyler, whom he plucks from obscurity on planet Earth, and to whom he grows increasingly attached. He also travels briefly with unruly boy-genius Adam Mitchell, played by Bruno Langley, and with 51st-century con man and former "Time Agent" Captain Jack Harkness, portrayed by John Barrowman. Episodes in the series form a loose story arc, based upon the recurring phrase "Bad Wolf", the significance of which goes unexplained until the two-part series finale. Alongside the "Bad Wolf" arc, the revived era re-introduces the Doctor as the sole survivor of an event known as the Time War, which the Doctor claims wiped out all of the Time Lords and the Daleks.

The series premiere was watched by 10.81 million viewers, and four days after the premiere episode was broadcast, Doctor Who was renewed for a Christmas special as well as a second series. The series was well received by both critics and fans, winning a BAFTA Award for the first time in Doctor Who's history. The approval from Michael Grade, who had previously forced an 18-month hiatus on the show in 1985, and had postponed Doctor Who out of personal dislike on several occasions, was cited as a factor in the show's resurgence. The show's popularity ultimately led to a resurgence in family-orientated Saturday-night drama.

== Episodes ==
Unlike the classic era of the series that ended in 1989, the plan with the new series was to have each episode as a standalone story, with no serials. Of the thirteen episodes in the series, seven of them followed this format; the remaining six were grouped together into three two-part stories. Also, for the first time since The Gunfighters in the third season, each episode was given an individual title, which was the case with the standalone and two-part stories.

No. story	No. in series	Title	Directed by	Written by	Original release date	Prod. code	UK viewers (millions)	AI
157	1	"Rose"	Keith Boak	Russell T Davies	26 March 2005	1.1	10.81	76
In the basement of the shop where Rose Tyler works, plastic mannequins begin to attack her. The Ninth Doctor rescues her and they flee the building, which he blows up. The next day, Rose and her boyfriend, Mickey Smith visit a man named Clive who runs a conspiracy theory website, concerning a man fitting the Doctor's description, who has appeared throughout history. While Rose is talking to Clive, Mickey is kidnapped and replaced by a plastic duplicate. Rose meets the Doctor again, where he reveals Mickey to be an Auton, and he and Rose locate the Nestene Consciousness which controls the Autons and has been using the London Eye as a transmitter. At this point, Auton mannequins come alive and start killing other people. Rose saves the Doctor and those that the Autons had been killing, and she decides to travel with the Doctor through time and space in his time machine the TARDIS.
158	2	"The End of the World"	Euros Lyn	Russell T Davies	2 April 2005	1.2	7.97	76
The Doctor takes Rose to the year five billion, where they land on a space station orbiting the Earth named Platform One. Among the elite alien guests assembled to watch the Earth be destroyed by the expanding Sun is Lady Cassandra, who takes pride in being the last pure human, though she has received many operations that have altered her image. It is discovered that Cassandra, to receive money for her many operations, plans to let the guests die and then profit from the stock increases of their competitors. She releases discreet robotic spiders all over Platform One, and they start interfering with the systems. She departs via teleportation and the spiders bring down the shields, causing harmful direct solar radiation to penetrate the station. The Doctor manages to reactivate the system and save Rose, after which he brings Cassandra back and she ruptures from the intense solar heat.
159	3	"The Unquiet Dead"	Euros Lyn	Mark Gatiss	9 April 2005	1.3	8.86	80
The Doctor and Rose travel back to Cardiff in 1869, where a funeral parlour, run by Gabriel Sneed with his clairvoyant servant girl Gwyneth, contains corpses which have been animated by a mysterious blue vapour. Sneed and Gwyneth kidnap Rose, and the Doctor teams up with Charles Dickens to track her down. In the funeral parlour, the group is reunited and the Doctor determines that the blue vapour is the result of a being trying to cross a rift in the spacetime the parlour is built on. They are revealed to be the Gelth, who animate bodies until they can build their own, and are using Gwyneth as a bridge. The Gelth lie about their numbers and intentions, intending to kill billions of living humans, and not just inhabit existing corpses. Gwyneth volunteers to ignite the gas which Dickens flooded the cellar with, closing the rift and trapping all the Gelth. The Doctor, Rose, and Dickens escape before the parlour is engulfed in flames.
160a	4	"Aliens of London"	Keith Boak	Russell T Davies	16 April 2005	1.4	7.63	82
The Doctor intends to take Rose back to her home 12 hours after she left, but they arrive a year after instead. Her mother Jackie is furious with the Doctor, and Mickey has been suspected of murdering Rose. Rose and the Doctor witness a spaceship crash into Big Ben and fall into the River Thames. The Doctor suspects this is a trick and discovers that the ship was launched from Earth, and that the pilot is a pig, modified by alien technology. The Prime Minister cannot be located, and is replaced by Joseph Green, while Margaret Blaine and Oliver Charles, other high-ranking members of the government, are also called. The group is revealed to be the Slitheen, an alien family who have compressed themselves into human "suits".
160b	5	"World War Three"	Keith Boak	Russell T Davies	23 April 2005	1.5	7.98	81
The Doctor learns that the Slitheen are not invading Earth, but rather raiding it for commercial profit. The Slitheen claim there is a threat to the world's security and request that the United Nations release the nuclear activation code, so they can strike down a nonexistent ship supposedly hovering over London. The Doctor speculates they will fire at other countries and start World War III, which the Slitheen respond in the affirmative, explaining that they will sell the irradiated remains of Earth as cheap spaceship fuel. Meanwhile, another Slitheen breaks into Mickey's flat where he uses acetic acid in vinegar to destroy it. The Doctor helps Mickey to fire a non-nuclear missile at 10 Downing Street to destroy the Slitheen gathered there. The Doctor, Rose, and MP Harriet Jones manage to hide in a reinforced room and survive. Meanwhile, the Doctor has earned Jackie's trust and she allows Rose to continue travelling with him whilst he offers Mickey an opportunity to join the two on the TARDIS, but he turns it down.
161	6	"Dalek"	Joe Ahearne	Robert Shearman	30 April 2005	1.6	8.63	84
The TARDIS is drawn off course by a signal and Rose and the Doctor end up near Salt Lake City, Utah in 2012, in an underground bunker owned by Henry van Statten, a rich collector of alien artefacts. The Doctor encounters his one living exhibit, which the Doctor is horrified to discover is a Dalek that survived the Time War; the Dalek is the last survivor of a race of genetically manipulated mutants bound on purging the universe of all non-Dalek life, and the Doctor's greatest enemy. One of van Statten's employees, Adam Mitchell, leads Rose to the Dalek, but she takes pity on it and touches it, allowing it to absorb her DNA and become active. The Dalek kills many soldiers before catching up with Rose, Adam and the Doctor. Rose becomes trapped with the Dalek, but it spares her life as it has gained sympathy from Rose's DNA and destroys itself. As the Doctor and Rose leave, Adam boards the TARDIS to avoid the closure of van Statten's Vault.
162	7	"The Long Game"	Brian Grant	Russell T Davies	7 May 2005	1.7	8.01	81
The Doctor, Rose, and Adam travel to the year 200,000 and land on the space station Satellite 5, which controls journalism. Ever since the satellite began broadcasting, something has held the human race's attitude and technology back. The Editor invites the Doctor and Rose to the elite Floor 500, where he holds them captive, explaining that he and a creature known as the Jagrafess have made, through Satellite 5, the "Fourth Great and Bountiful Human Empire" a place where the news has installed fear in the human race, keeping them in a closed society. Meanwhile, Adam has installed a port in his head and is transmitting all the knowledge on Satellite 5 to his parents' answering machine at home. The journalist Cathica redirects the heat to Floor 500, allowing Rose and the Doctor to escape, while the Editor and the Jagrafess are destroyed by the heat. The Doctor is furious at Adam and returns him to his house, destroying the answering machine and banishing Adam from the TARDIS.
163	8	"Father's Day"	Joe Ahearne	Paul Cornell	14 May 2005	1.8	8.06	83
Rose asks the Doctor to take her back to the day her father Pete Tyler died in a hit and run accident. Instead of being with him as he dies, Rose saves Pete's life, creating a wound in time and space, which flying creatures known as Reapers attempt to treat by consuming everyone in it. The guests at the wedding of Jackie and Pete's friends hide in a church while the Doctor tries to summon the TARDIS inside. Jackie accuses Pete of having another daughter, and to prove that Rose is the same as the baby Rose, he puts the baby in the older Rose's arms, causing a Reaper to appear inside the church and kill the Doctor. Pete realises he must die for everything to be repaired, and throws himself in front of the car, which has been appearing and reappearing around the corner of the church, causing everyone the Reapers consumed, including the Doctor, to return.
164a	9	"The Empty Child"	James Hawes	Steven Moffat	21 May 2005	1.9	7.11	84
Chasing a metal cylinder through the Time Vortex, the Doctor and Rose land in London during the Blitz. Rose follows a young boy in a gas mask who repeatedly asks if she is his mother. She climbs a rope attached to a barrage balloon that rises into the air, and is rescued by Captain Jack Harkness (previously a Time Agent, now a con man), who interests her in buying a valuable warship. The Doctor talks with a young woman named Nancy who knows the boy is connected to a bomb-like object that recently fell. She directs the Doctor to a hospital where Dr Constantine shows him patients with injuries and gas masks identical to the boy's. Nancy reveals the child is her brother, Jamie. Rose and Jack arrive in time to save the Doctor as Constantine begins to transform like his patients.
164b	10	"The Doctor Dances"	James Hawes	Steven Moffat	28 May 2005	1.10	6.86	85
Jack explains that he sent the metal object through the time vortex to attract Time Agents to this time period, where he would have them pay for the object, but before they could receive it, a German bomb would fall on it. Jack claims that it is a perfectly safe and "empty" old medical transport, but the Doctor is suspicious. At the site where the transport is held, the Doctor realises that it once contained nanogenes that are able to heal wounds, and deduces that the nanogenes attempted to heal Jamie, but thought that all humans should have similar injuries and gas masks. Nancy claims it is all her fault as she is actually Jamie's mother, which she admits in front of the child. As they hug, the nanogenes identify Nancy's DNA as being his mother's and reverse Jamie's transformation so that they resemble each other; the rest is done to all the others who had been converted. Jack captures the bomb that would have fallen on the site and the Doctor and Rose rescue him before it explodes, inviting him on the TARDIS.
165	11	"Boom Town"	Joe Ahearne	Russell T Davies	4 June 2005	1.11	7.68	82
The Doctor, Rose, and Jack visit Cardiff to refuel the TARDIS at the rift, and Mickey meets them there. They discover that the Slitheen impersonating Margaret Blaine is now the mayor of Cardiff, and they capture her, suspicious of what she has done. The Doctor sees that she has created a nuclear power plant designed to open the rift and destroy Earth, and has acquired an alien device she would use to flee. Margaret objects to being taken back to her home planet, as she is considered a criminal there and would be given the death penalty. After several failed attempts in killing the Doctor, Margaret requests to be taken to another planet. Jack sees the opportunity to use Margaret's extrapolator to speed up recharging the TARDIS, but this proves to be a trap as it was meant to send the nearest alien power source to the rift. As an earthquake strikes Cardiff, Margaret looks into the heart of the TARDIS, which gives her a second chance at life, restoring her back into an egg.
166a	12	"Bad Wolf"	Joe Ahearne	Russell T Davies	11 June 2005	1.12	6.81	86
The Doctor, Rose, and Jack wake up from amnesia into various reality television and game shows; the Doctor is in a Big Brother-like house, Rose is a contestant on The Weakest Link, where those eliminated are thought to be disintegrated by the Anne Droid, and Jack is on a What Not to Wear-like show where two female robots offer to give contestants a new image. The Doctor and Jack escape from their shows, which are deadlier than their 21st century counterparts, and find they are on Satellite 5, one hundred years after the Doctor's last visit, where it is run by the Bad Wolf Corporation and known as the Game Station. The Doctor, Jack, and Big Brother contestant Lynda find Rose as she is disintegrated on The Weakest Link, and they travel to Floor 500, where Jack figures out the contestants are not disintegrated, but rather transmitted to a point in space. They learn that Rose has arrived on a ship containing Daleks, and the Doctor vows to rescue her and destroy the Daleks, which prompts the fleet of almost half a million Daleks to begin invading Earth.
166b	13	"The Parting of the Ways"	Joe Ahearne	Russell T Davies	18 June 2005	1.13	6.91	89
The Doctor and Jack take the TARDIS to Rose and return her to the Game Station after confronting the Dalek Emperor. The Doctor prepares to destroy the Daleks using a delta wave. He tricks Rose into entering the TARDIS and remotely sends her back home to safety. The Daleks invade the Game Station, killing Lynda and Jack among many others. Regaining her composure at home, Rose notices the words "Bad Wolf" around the area, and realises it is a message. Mickey pries open the heart of the TARDIS and Rose establishes contact. Empowered by the Time Vortex, Rose returns to the Doctor, where she uses the vortex's power to destroy all the Daleks, resurrect Jack, and scatter the words "Bad Wolf" throughout time and space to lead herself here. To prevent the power from killing Rose, the Doctor absorbs it by kissing her; she wakes up in the TARDIS just as the time energy is destroying the Doctor's cells, causing him to regenerate into the Tenth Doctor.

== Cast ==
=== Main cast ===
The production team was tasked with finding a suitable actor for the role of the Doctor. Most notably, they approached film stars Hugh Grant and Rowan Atkinson for the role. By the time Mal Young had suggested actor Christopher Eccleston to Davies, Eccleston was one of only three left in the running for the role: the other two candidates are rumoured in the industry to have been Alan Davies and Bill Nighy. His involvement in the programme was announced on 20 March 2004 following months of speculation. In the April 2004 issue of Doctor Who Magazine, Davies announced that Eccleston's Doctor would indeed be the Ninth Doctor, relegating Richard E. Grant's Shalka Doctor to non-official status. Russell T Davies revealed that Eccleston asked for the role in an email.

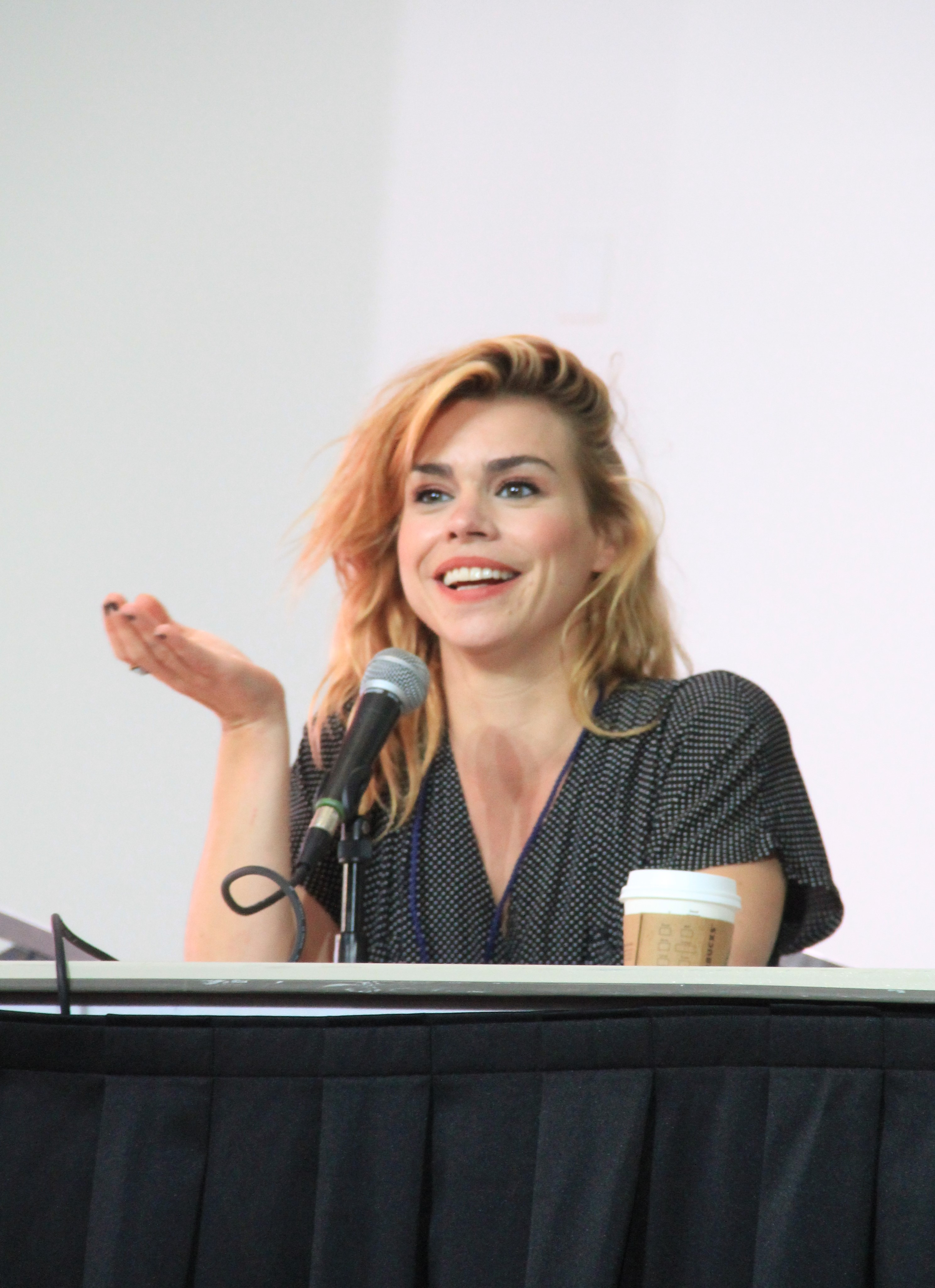
Billie Piper, who portrays Rose Tyler, was welcomed by fans.

After the announcement that the show would be returning, Davies revealed that the new companion would "probably" be called Rose Tyler in an edition of Doctor Who Magazine published in November 2003. This name was confirmed in March 2004, and it was announced at the same time that former pop star Billie Piper was being considered for the role. Piper was announced as portraying Rose Tyler on 24 May, a character which fulfilled the role of permanent companion during the series, and was welcomed by some fans of the show. Actress Georgia Moffett, daughter of Fifth Doctor actor Peter Davison and who would later appear as the title role in the fourth series episode "The Doctor's Daughter", also auditioned for the role. The original conception of Tyler was slightly different. Paul Abbott was scheduled to write an episode for the series which would have revealed that Rose's entire life had been manipulated by the Doctor in order to mould her into an ideal companion. Davies eventually wrote "Boom Town" to replace it when Abbott, after months of development, realised he was too busy to work on the script.

The first series was Christopher Eccleston's only series in the role of the Doctor. Eccleston's contract was for a single year because at the time it was uncertain whether the show would continue beyond a single revival series. Eccleston's intent to leave was revealed on 30 March 2005, shortly after the broadcast of the first episode. The BBC released a statement, attributed to Eccleston, saying that he had decided to leave because he feared becoming typecast. On 4 April, the BBC revealed that Eccleston's "statement" was falsely attributed and released without his consent. The BBC admitted that they had broken an agreement made in January not to disclose publicly that he only intended to do one season. In a 2010 interview, Eccleston revealed that he left the show because he "didn't enjoy the environment and the culture that [they], the cast and crew, had to work in", but that he was proud of having played the role.

=== Recurring and guest cast ===
The character of Adam Mitchell was first conceived, along with Henry van Statten, during Davies' pitch to the BBC, in a story heavily based on Robert Shearman's audio play Jubilee called "Return of the Daleks". The production team had always intended for Adam to join the TARDIS after Rose developed a liking for him. To play this role, Bruno Langley was chosen, previously known for his role on Coronation Street as Todd Grimshaw. It was never intended for Adam to be a long-term companion, Davies wanted to show that not everyone is suitable to join the TARDIS crew and dubbed him "The Companion That Couldn't", he "always wanted to do a show with someone who was a rubbish companion".

John Barrowman appears as Captain Jack Harkness, a character introduced in "The Empty Child", where he joined the TARDIS crew for the final five episodes of the series. In naming the character, Davies drew inspiration from the Marvel Comics character Agatha Harkness. Jack's appearances were conceived with the intention of forming a character arc in which Jack is transformed from a coward to a hero, and Barrowman consciously minded this in his portrayal of the character. Following on that arc, the character's debut episode would leave his morality as ambiguous, publicity materials asking, "is he a force for good or ill?" Barrowman himself was a key factor in the conception of Captain Jack. Barrowman says that at the time of his initial casting, Davies and co-executive producer, Julie Gardner had explained to him that they "basically wrote the character around [John]". On meeting him, Barrowman tried out the character using his native Scottish accent, his normal American accent, and an English accent; Davies decided it "made it bigger if it was an American accent". Barrowman recounts Davies as having been searching for an actor with a "matinée idol quality", telling him that "the only one in the whole of Britain who could do it was you".

David Tennant had been offered the role of the Doctor when he was watching a pre-transmission copy of the series with Davies and Gardner. Tennant initially believed the offer was a joke, but after he realised they were serious, he accepted the role and first appeared in the series finale "The Parting of the Ways". Tennant was announced as Eccleston's replacement on 16 April 2005. Other recurring characters for the series included Camille Coduri as Rose's mother Jackie Tyler, and Noel Clarke as Rose's boyfriend Mickey Smith. Other actors and television presenters who appeared in the series included Mark Benton, Zoë Wanamaker, Simon Callow, Eve Myles, Penelope Wilton, Annette Badland, David Verrey, Matt Baker, Andrew Marr, Corey Johnson, Simon Pegg, Anna Maxwell-Martin, Tamsin Greig, Shaun Dingwall, Florence Hoath, Richard Wilson, Jo Joyner, Davina McCall, Paterson Joseph, Anne Robinson, Trinny Woodall, and Susannah Constantine.

== Production ==
=== Development ===
During the late-1990s, Davies, a lifelong Doctor Who fan, lobbied the BBC to revive the show from its hiatus and reached the discussion stages in late 1998 and early 2002. His proposals would update the show to be better suited for a 21st-century audience, including the transition from videotape to film, doubling the length of each episode from twenty-five minutes to fifty, keeping the Doctor primarily on Earth in the style of the Third Doctor UNIT episodes, and removing "excess baggage" such as Gallifrey and the Time Lords. His pitch competed against three others: Dan Freedman's fantasy retelling, Matthew Graham's Gothic-styled pitch, and Mark Gatiss, Clayton Hickman, and Gareth Roberts' reboot, which would make the Doctor the audience surrogate character, instead of his companions.

In August 2003, the BBC had resolved the issues regarding production rights that had surfaced as a result of the jointly produced Universal Studios–BBC–Fox 1996 Doctor Who film, leading the Controller of BBC One Lorraine Heggessey and Controller of Drama Commissioning Jane Tranter to approach Gardner and Davies to create a revival of the series to air in a primetime slot on Saturday nights, as part of the BBC's plan to devolve production to its regional bases. By mid-September, they accepted the deal to produce the series alongside Casanova.

We were told that bringing it back would be impossible, that we would never capture this generation of children. But we did it.

— Russell T Davies, 2006 BAFTAs

Following Scream of the Shalka, an animated serial which was released on the Doctor Who website, the 'real' return of Doctor Who was announced on 26 September 2003 in a press release from the BBC.

Davies voluntarily wrote a pitch for the series, the first time he had done so; he previously chose to jump straight to writing pilot episodes because he felt that a pitch would "feel like [he's] killing the work". The fifteen-page pitch outlined a Doctor who was "your best friend; someone you want to be with all the time"; the eighteen-year-old Rose Tyler as a "perfect match" for the new Doctor; avoidance of the forty-year backstory "except for the good bits"; the retention of the TARDIS, sonic screwdriver, and Daleks; removal of the Time Lords; and also a greater focus on humanity. His pitch was submitted for the first production meeting in December 2003, with a series of thirteen episodes obtained by pressure from BBC Worldwide and a workable budget from Julie Gardner.

By early 2004, the show had settled into a regular production cycle. Davies, Gardner, and BBC Controller of Drama Mal Young took posts as executive producers, although Young vacated the role at the end of the series. Phil Collinson, an old colleague from Granada, took the role of producer. Keith Boak, Euros Lyn, Joe Ahearne, Brian Grant and James Hawes directed the series. Davies' official role as head writer and executive producer, or "showrunner", consisted of laying a skeletal plot for the entire series, holding "tone meetings" to correctly identify the tone of an episode, often being described in one word—for example, the "tone word" for Moffat's "The Empty Child" was "romantic"—and overseeing all aspects of production. During early production the word "Torchwood", an anagram of "Doctor Who", was used as a title ruse for the series while filming its first few episodes and on the daily rushes to ensure they were not intercepted. The word "Torchwood" was later seeded in Doctor Who and became the name of the spin-off series Torchwood.

Davies was interested in making an episode that would serve as a crossover with Star Trek: Enterprise, and involve the TARDIS landing on board the NX-01. The idea was officially discussed, but the plans were abandoned following the cancellation of Enterprise in February 2005.

=== Writing ===
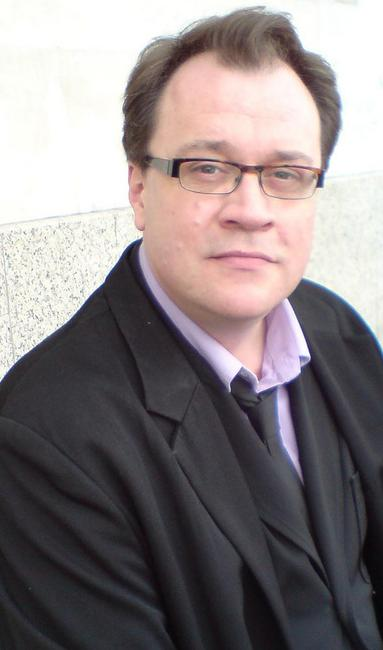
Russell T Davies tried to revive the show since the late-90s and wrote the scripts for eight of the 13 episodes in the first series.

The first series of Doctor Who featured eight scripts by Davies, the remainder being allocated to experienced drama writers and previous writers for the show's ancillary releases: Steven Moffat penned a two-episode story, while Mark Gatiss, Robert Shearman, and Paul Cornell each wrote one script. Davies also approached his friend Paul Abbott and Harry Potter author J. K. Rowling to write for the series, but both declined due to existing commitments. Shortly after securing writers for the show, Davies stated that he had no intention to approach writers for the old series; the only writer he would have wished to work with was Robert Holmes, who died in May 1986, halfway through writing his contribution to The Trial of a Time Lord.

Elwen Rowlands and Helen Raynor served as script editors for the series. They were hired simultaneously, marking the first time Doctor Who had female script editors. Rowlands left after the first series for Life on Mars. Compared to the original series the role of the script editors was significantly diminished, with the head writer taking most of those responsibilities. Unlike the original series they did not have the power to commission scripts. Instead, they acted as liaisons between the production staff and the screenwriter, before passing their joint work to the head writer for a "final polish". Raynor said that the job is not a creative one, "you are a part of it, but you aren't driving it."

Under producer Davies, the new series had a faster pace than those of the classic series. Rather than four- to six-part serials of 25-minute episodes, most of the Ninth Doctor's stories consisted of individual 45-minute episodes, with only three stories out of ten being two-parters. The thirteen episodes were, however, loosely connected in a series-long story arc which brought their disparate threads together in the series finale. Davies took cues from American fantasy television series such as Buffy the Vampire Slayer and Smallville, most notably Buffy's concepts of series-long story arcs and the "Big Bad". Also, like the original series, stories often flowed directly into one another or were linked together in some way. Notably, in common only with the seventh and twenty-sixth seasons of the original series, every story of the season takes place on or near Earth. This fact is directly addressed in the original novel The Monsters Inside, in which Rose and the Doctor joke about the fact that all their adventures to date have taken place on Earth or on neighbouring space stations.

The stories of the series varied quite significantly in tone, with the production team showcasing the various genres inhabited by Doctor Who over the years. Examples include the "pseudo-historical" story "The Unquiet Dead"; the far-future whodunnit of "The End of the World"; Earthbound alien invasion stories in "Rose" and "Aliens of London"/"World War Three"; "base under siege" in "Dalek"; and horror in "The Empty Child". Even the spin-off media were represented, with "Dalek" taking elements from writer Rob Shearman's own audio play Jubilee and the emotional content of Paul Cornell's "Father's Day" drawing on the tone of Cornell's novels in the Virgin New Adventures line. Davies had asked both Shearman and Cornell to write their scripts with those respective styles in mind. The episode "Boom Town" included a reference to the novel The Monsters Inside, becoming the first episode to acknowledge (albeit in a subtle way) spin-off fiction.

Several story threads were scrapped. One story thread, written by Paul Abbott, would have seen the Doctor manipulate Rose's life to determine the perfect companion. This episode was intended for the slot of the eleventh episode, though was dropped due to Abbott's commitment to Shameless and other projects. Another episode premise, also considered for the eleventh episode slot, would have seen the Doctor, Rose, and Captain Jack visiting Pompeii on the day of its eruption, though this was also scrapped..

=== Filming ===
Principal photography for the series began on 18 July 2004 on location in Cardiff for "Aliens of London". The series was filmed across South East Wales, mostly in or around Cardiff. Each episode took about two weeks to film. The start of filming created stress among the production team because of unseen circumstances: several scenes from the first block had to be re-shot because the original footage was unusable; the Slitheen prosthetics for "Aliens of London" and "World War Three" were noticeably different from their computer-generated counterparts; and, most notably, the BBC came to a gridlock with the Terry Nation estate to secure the Daleks for the sixth episode of the series, to be written by Rob Shearman. After the first production block, which Davies described as "hitting a brick wall", the show's production was markedly eased as the crew familiarised themselves. Filming concluded on 23 March 2005. David Tennant, who was cast as Eccleston's replacement, recorded his appearance at the end of "The Parting of the Ways" on 21 April 2005 with a skeleton crew. Production blocks were arranged as follows:

Block	Episode(s)	Director	Writer(s)	Producer	Code
1	Episode 1: "Rose"	Keith Boak	Russell T Davies	Phil Collinson	1.1
1	Episode 4: "Aliens of London"	Keith Boak	Russell T Davies	Phil Collinson	1.4
1	Episode 5: "World War Three"	Keith Boak	Russell T Davies	Phil Collinson	1.5
2	Episode 2: "The End of the World"	Euros Lyn	Russell T Davies	Phil Collinson	1.2
2	Episode 3: "The Unquiet Dead"	Euros Lyn	Mark Gatiss	Phil Collinson	1.3
3	Episode 6: "Dalek"	Joe Ahearne	Robert Shearman	Phil Collinson	1.6
3	Episode 8: "Father's Day"	Joe Ahearne	Paul Cornell	Phil Collinson	1.8
4	Episode 7: "The Long Game"	Brian Grant	Russell T Davies	Phil Collinson	1.7
5	Episode 9: "The Empty Child"	James Hawes	Steven Moffat	Phil Collinson	1.9
5	Episode 10: "The Doctor Dances"	James Hawes	Steven Moffat	Phil Collinson	1.10
6	Episode 11: "Boom Town"	Joe Ahearne	Russell T Davies	Phil Collinson	1.11
6	Episode 12: "Bad Wolf"	Joe Ahearne	Russell T Davies	Phil Collinson	1.12
6	Episode 13: "The Parting of the Ways"	Joe Ahearne	Russell T Davies	Phil Collinson	1.13

=== Music ===
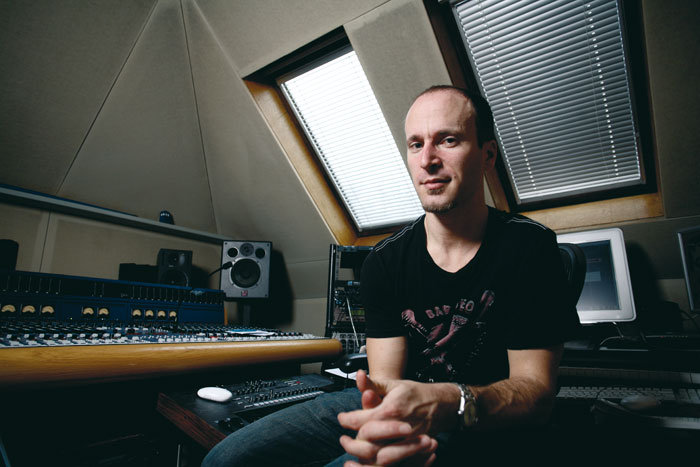
Murray Gold (pictured in 2007) wrote the series' score.

Murray Gold composed the incidental music for this series, having previously worked with Davies on Queer as Folk and The Second Coming. Gold expected to compose in the style of the classic series, using synthesiser-based arrangements, but Davies and Gardner requested a more orchestral and acoustic sound. Most cues were realised electronically. Gold was influenced by the work of classic series composer Dudley Simpson for Mickey's encounter with the bin in "Rose". Soprano pieces were recorded by Melanie Pappenheim. Gold's score was added to the edit in late November 2004.

== Release ==
=== Promotion ===
The new logo was revealed on the BBC website on 18 October 2004. The first official trailer was released as part of BBC One's Winter Highlights presentation on 2 December 2004 and subsequently posted on the Internet by the BBC. A media blitz including billboards and posters across the UK started early March 2005. Television trailers started showing up on 5 March and radio advertisements started two weeks before the series premiere and ran till the second episode aired. The official Doctor Who website was launched with exclusive content such as games and new Ninth Doctor information.

=== Leak ===
An early edit of the premiere was leaked onto the Internet three weeks before the scheduled series premiere. This attracted much media attention and discussion amongst fans, and caused interest in the show to skyrocket. The BBC released a statement that the source of the leak appeared to be connected to the Canadian Broadcasting Corporation, which responded by stating that they "are looking into it. That's all I can say at this point because we don't know exactly what happened. It certainly wasn't done intentionally." Asa Bailey, founder of the Viral Advertising Association, said that the BBC hired them for viral marketing strategies, and that he told them "they should release things before their time", to create a "cool factor". Both the BBC and CBC denied any involvement, but Bailey believes that to be disingenuous, saying that it is "the best viral advert they could have done". The leak was ultimately traced to a third-party company in Canada which had a legitimate preview copy. The employee responsible was fired by the company.

=== Broadcast ===
"Rose" finally saw transmission on schedule on 26 March 2005 at 7 pm on BBC One, the first regular episode of Doctor Who since Part Three of Survival on 6 December 1989. To complement the series, BBC Wales also produced Doctor Who Confidential, a 13-part documentary series with each episode broadcast on BBC Three immediately after the end of the weekly instalment on BBC One. Both the series and documentary aired for thirteen consecutive weeks, with the finale episode, "The Parting of the Ways", airing on 18 June 2005 along with its documentary counterpart. Davies had requested that the two first episodes be broadcast back to back, but the request was given to the BBC just two weeks before transmission, at which point everything was already set. In some regions, the first few minutes of the original BBC broadcast of "Rose" on 26 March were marred by the accidental mixing of a few seconds of sound from Graham Norton hosting Strictly Dance Fever.

In the United States, the Sci Fi Channel originally passed on the new series as it found it lacking and believed it did not fit in its schedule, but the network later changed its mind. After it was announced that the first series would start in March 2006, Sci Fi Channel executive vice president Thomas Vitale called Doctor Who "a true sci-fi classic", with creative storytelling and colourful history, and was excited to add it to its lineup. The network also took an option on the second series. Candace Carlisle from BBC Worldwide found the Sci Fi Channel the perfect home for Doctor Who. Doctor Who finally debuted in the U.S. on the Sci Fi Channel on 17 March 2006 with the first two episodes airing back to back, one year after the Canadian and UK showings. The series concluded its initial U.S. broadcast on 9 June 2006.

=== Home media ===
==== DVD and Blu-ray releases ====
The series was first released in volumes; the first volume, containing the first three episodes, was released in Region 2 on 16 May 2005. The second, with "Aliens of London", "World War Three", and "Dalek", followed on 13 June 2005. "The Long Game", "Father's Day", "The Empty Child", and "The Doctor Dances" were released in the third volume on 1 August 2005 and the final three episodes were released in the fourth volume on 5 September 2005.

The entire series was then released in a boxset on 21 November 2005 in Region 2. Aside from the thirteen episodes it included commentaries on every episode, a video diary from Davies during the first week of filming, as well as other featurettes. The boxset was released in Region 1 on 4 July 2006.

All releases are for DVD unless otherwise indicated:

- ^{(D)} indicates a DVD release for a specific date
- ^{(B)} indicates a Blu-ray release

Series	Story no.	Episode name	Duration	Release date		
Series	Story no.	Episode name	Duration	R2	R4	R1
1	157–159	Doctor Who: Volume 1 "Rose" – "The Unquiet Dead"	3 × 45 min.	16 May 2005	17 June 2005	7 November 2006
1	160–161	Doctor Who: Volume 2 "Aliens of London" – "Dalek"	3 × 45 min.	13 June 2005	3 August 2005	7 November 2006
1	162–164	Doctor Who: Volume 3 "The Long Game" – "The Doctor Dances"	4 × 45 min.	1 August 2005	31 August 2005	7 November 2006
1	165–166	Doctor Who: Volume 4 "Boom Town" – "The Parting of the Ways"	3 × 45 min.	5 September 2005	6 October 2005	7 November 2006
1	157–166	Doctor Who: The Complete First Series	13 × 45 min.	21 November 2005 ^{(D)} 4 November 2013 ^{(B)} (Note: Part of The Complete Series 1–7); 31 August 2015 ^{(B)}	8 December 2005 ^{(D)} 4 December 2013 ^{(B)}	14 February 2006 (Note: 4 July 2006 in the United States) ^{(D)} 5 November 2013 ^{(B)} 21 June 2016 ^{(B)}

==== UMD releases ====
series	Story no.	Episode name	Duration	Release date		
series	Story no.	Episode name	Duration	UK	Australia	USA / Canada
1	157–159	"Rose" "End of the World" "The Unquiet Dead"	3 × 45 min.	12 December 2005	4 July 2006	—N/a
1	160–161	"Aliens of London" "World War Three" "Dalek"	3 × 45 min.	17 October 2005	4 July 2006	—N/a
1	162–164	"The Long Game" "Father's Day" "The Empty Child" "The Doctor Dances"	4 × 45 min. (Note: The only UMD release to be split across two discs, as it contains four episodes instead of the usual three.)	26 December 2005	4 July 2006	—N/a
1	165–166	"Boom Town" "Bad Wolf" "The Parting of the Ways"	3 × 45 min.	26 December 2005	4 July 2006	—N/a

== In print ==
Series	Story no.	Novelisation title	Author	Hardcover release date (Note: Published by BBC Books unless otherwise indicated)	Paperback release date (Note: Published by BBC Books under the Target Collection umbrella unless otherwise indicated)	Audiobook	
Series	Story no.	Novelisation title	Author	Hardcover release date	Paperback release date	Release date (Note: Unabridged from BBC Audio / AudioGo unless otherwise indicated)	Narrator
1	157	Rose	Russell T Davies	23 November 2023	5 April 2018	3 May 2018	Camille Coduri
1	160	Aliens of London (Note: Also adapts "World War Three")	Joseph Lidster	—N/a	26 March 2026		Camille Coduri
1	161	Dalek	Robert Shearman	—N/a	11 March 2021		Nicholas Briggs

== Reception ==
=== Ratings ===
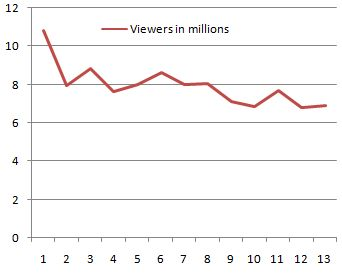
Final ratings for the first series.

"Rose" received average overnight ratings of 9.9 million viewers, peaking at 10.5 million, respectively 43.2% and 44.3% of all viewers at that time. The final figure for the episode, including video recordings watched within a week of transmission, was 10.81 million, making it the third highest for BBC One that week and seventh across all channels. The opening episode was the highest rated episode of the first series. The penultimate episode, "Bad Wolf", received the lowest viewers of the series with just 6.81 million viewers. The series also garnered the highest audience Appreciation Index of any non-soap drama on television. Besides the second episode, "The End of the World", which garnered a 79% rating, the lowest of the series, all episodes received an AI above 80%. The series finale "The Parting of the Ways" was the highest rated episode with an AI of 89%. The success of the launch saw the BBC's Head of Drama Jane Tranter confirming on 30 March that the series would return both for a Christmas Special in December 2005 and a full second series in 2006.

The initial Sci Fi Channel broadcasts of the series attained an average Nielsen Rating of 1.3, representing 1.5 million viewers in total. Although these ratings were less than those reached by Sci Fi's original series Battlestar Galactica, Stargate SG-1 and Stargate Atlantis, they reflect a 44% increase in ratings and a 56% increase in viewership over the same timeslot in the second quarter of 2005, as well as increases of 56% and 57% in two key demographics.

Ratings Ranking of Episodes using 7 day data
Episode Title	BBC One (Daily)	All Channels (Daily)	BBC One (Weekly)	All Channels (Weekly)
Rose	#1	#1	#3	#7
End of the World	#1	#1	#6	#19
The Unquiet Dead	#1	#1	#5	#15
Aliens of London	#2	#2	#6	#18
World War Three	#2	#2	#6	#20
Dalek	#1	#1	#5	#14
The Long Game	#2	#2	#6	#17
Father's Day	#1	#1	#5	#17
The Empty Child	#3	#3	#8	#21
The Doctor Dances	#1	#1	#7	#18
Boom Town	#2	#2	#7	#18
Bad Wolf	#2	#2	#8	#19
Parting of the Ways	#1	#1	#7	#17
Series Average	#2	#2	#6	#17

=== Critical reception ===
The title card for the series of Doctor Who features the new logo, which some fans disliked so much they sent hate mail to the production team.

Review aggregation website Rotten Tomatoes offers an 83% approval from 12 critic reviews, and an average rating of 8.6/10.

In April 2004, Michael Grade returned to the BBC, this time as the Chairman of the Board of Governors, although this position did not involve any commissioning or editorial responsibilities. Although he had previously disliked the show and imposed an eighteen-month hiatus on it during the Sixth Doctor era, he eventually wrote an email to the Director-General of the BBC Mark Thompson in June 2005, after the successful new first series, voicing approval for its popularity. He also declared, "[I] never dreamed I would ever write this. I must be going soft!" The revival also impressed former Doctor Sylvester McCoy, who praised Eccleston and Piper as well as their characters, and the pacing of the first episode. His only criticism was about the new TARDIS interior, though he did comment that he was "also a bit dismayed that more wasn't made of the show's incidental music, which seemed fairly anonymous in the background".

Robin Oliver of The Sydney Morning Herald praised Davies for taking "an adult approach to one of television's most famous characters" that children would appreciate, and that he reinvented it in a way that would be "competitive in a high-tech market". Oliver also wrote that older viewers would find Eccleston "easily the best time lord since Tom Baker". Reviewing the first episode, The Stage's Harry Venning hailed it as a "fabulous, imaginative, funny and sometimes frightening reinvention" and particularly praised Rose for being an improvement upon previous female companions who were "fit only to scream or be captured". However, he found Eccleston to be "the show's biggest disappointment" as he looked "uncomfortable playing fantasy". Digital Spy's Dek Hogan found the final episode anticlimactic, but overall said that the series was "excellent Saturday night telly of the kind that many of us thought the BBC had forgotten how to make". He praised Eccleston's performance and named "The Empty Child" and "The Doctor Dances" as the best episodes. Arnold T Blumburg of Now Playing gave the series a grade of A−, praising its variety. However, he was critical of Davies' "annoying tendency to play to the lowest common denominator with toilet humor", but felt that from "Dalek" on the series was more dramatic and sophisticated.

DVD Talk's John Sinnott rated the first series four and a half out of five stars, writing that it "keeps a lot of the charm and excitement of the original (as well as the premise), while making the series easily accessible for new viewers". Sinnott praised the faster pace and the design changes that made it feel "fresh", as well as Eccleston's Doctor. However, he felt that Piper only did a "credible" job as Eccleston eclipsed her, and said that the writing was "uneven" with many of the episodes "just slightly flawed". Looking back on the series in 2011, Stephen Kelly of The Guardian wrote, "Eccleston's Doctor may have had many faults – looking like an EastEnders extra and bellowing "FANTASTIC!" at every opportunity being two of them – but he was merely a reflection of a show that, at the time, still didn't know what it wanted to be. The first series of the revived Doctor Who – which featured farting aliens – was a world away from the intelligent, populist science-fiction we know it as now. But then, it is thanks to Eccleston that it got this far at all – a big, respectable name who laid the foundations for Tennant to swag away with the show."

However, not everyone was pleased with the new production. Some fans criticised the new logo and perceived changes to the TARDIS model. According to various news sources, members of the production team even received hate mail and death threats. "The Unquiet Dead" was criticised by parents, who felt that the episode was "too scary" for their young children; the BBC dismissed the complaints, saying that it had never been intended for the youngest of children.

=== Awards and nominations ===
Awards and nominations
Year	Award	Category	Nominee(s)	Result	Ref(s)
2005	BBC 2005 TV Moments	Golden Moment	"The Doctor Dances"	Won	
2005	BBC.co.uk	Best of Drama	Doctor Who	Won	
2005	BBC.co.uk	Best Actor	Christopher Eccleston	Won	
2005	BBC.co.uk	Best Actress	Billie Piper	Won	
2005	BBC.co.uk	Most Desirable Star	Billie Piper	Won	
2005	BBC.co.uk	Best Drama Website	Doctor Who website	Won	
2005	BBC.co.uk	1st Favourite Moment	"Dalek"	Won	
2005	BBC.co.uk	Best Villain	Daleks	Won	
2005	National Television Awards	Most Popular Drama	Doctor Who	Won	
2005	National Television Awards	Most Popular Actor	Christopher Eccleston	Won	
2005	National Television Awards	Most Popular Actress	Billie Piper	Won	
2005	TV Choice	Best Actor	Christopher Eccleston	Won	
2005	TV Quick	Best Actor	Christopher Eccleston	Won	
2006	British Academy; Television Awards	Best Drama Series	Doctor Who	Won	
2006	British Academy; Television Awards	Pioneer Award	Doctor Who	Won	
2006	BAFTA Craft Awards	Writer	Russell T Davies	Nominated	
2006	BAFTA Craft Awards	Director	Joe Ahearne	Nominated	
2006	BAFTA Craft Awards	Breakthrough Talent	Edward Thomas	Nominated	
2006	BAFTA Cymru	Best Drama Series	Doctor Who	Won	
2006	BAFTA Cymru	Drama Director	James Hawes	Won	
2006	BAFTA Cymru	Costume, Make-up and Photography Direction	Doctor Who	Won	
2006	Broadcast Magazine	Award for Best Drama	Doctor Who	Won	
2006	Broadcasting Press Guild	Best Drama	Doctor Who	Nominated	
2006	Broadcasting Press Guild	Best Actor	Christopher Eccleston	Nominated	
2006	Broadcasting Press Guild	Best Actress	Billie Piper	Nominated	
2006	Broadcasting Press Guild	Best Writer	Russell T Davies	Nominated	
2006	Dennis Potter	Outstanding Writing for Television	Russell T Davies	Won	
2006	Hugo Awards	Hugo Award for Best Dramatic Presentation, Short Form	"Dalek"	Nominated	
2006	Hugo Awards	Hugo Award for Best Dramatic Presentation, Short Form	"Father's Day"	Nominated	
2006	Hugo Awards	Hugo Award for Best Dramatic Presentation, Short Form	"The Empty Child" / "The Doctor Dances"	Won	
2006	Royal Television Society	Best Drama Series	Doctor Who	Nominated	
2006	Siân Phillips	Outstanding Contribution to Network Television	Russell T Davies	Won	
2006	South Bank Show	Breakthrough Award For Rising British Talent	Billie Piper	Won	

== Soundtrack ==
Doctor Who: Original Television Soundtrack

Soundtrack album by Murray Gold
- Released: 4 December 2006
- Recorded: 2005–2006
- Genres: Soundtrack, incidental
- Length: 75:54
- Label: Silva Screen Records
- Producer: Murray Gold

Doctor Who soundtrack chronology
Devils' Planets – The Music of Tristram Cary (2003)	Original Television Soundtrack (2006)	Series 3 (2007)

Selected pieces of score from the first series, second series, and "The Runaway Bride", as composed by Murray Gold, were released on 4 December 2006 by Silva Screen Records. The cues from the first series were re-recorded by the BBC National Orchestra of Wales, the original music having been created using orchestral samples.

Gold's arrangement of the main theme featured samples from the 1963 original with further elements added: an orchestral sound of low horns, strings and percussion and part of the Dalek ray-gun and TARDIS materialisation sound effects. Included on the album are two versions of the theme: the 44-second opening version, as arranged by Gold, and a longer arrangement that includes the "middle eight" (a name given to one of the sections of the melody), after Gold omitted it from both the opening and closing credits. Gold has said that his interpretation was driven by the title visual sequence he was given to work around. Often erroneously cited as being the same as the end credits version, this second version is in fact a new arrangement and recording.

No.	Title	Episode	Length
1.	"Doctor Who Theme (TV version)"	Various	0:40
2.	"Westminster Bridge"	"Rose", "The Christmas Invasion"	2:10
3.	"Bad Wolf"	"The Parting of the Ways"	1:20
4.	"Cassandra's Waltz"	"The End of the World", "New Earth"	3:10
5.	"Slitheen"	"Aliens of London" / "World War Three", "Boom Town", "Love & Monsters"	1:24
6.	"Father's Day"	"Father's Day"	1:57
7.	"Rose in Peril"	"Bad Wolf" / "The Parting of the Ways"	1:41
8.	"Boom Town Suite"	"Boom Town"	3:04
9.	"I'm Coming to Get You"	"Bad Wolf"	1:14
10.	"Hologram"	"The Parting of the Ways"	2:17
11.	"Rose Defeats the Daleks"	"The Parting of the Ways"	2:33
12.	"Clockwork TARDIS"	"The End of the World"	1:20
13.	"Harriet Jones, Prime Minister"	"World War Three", "The Christmas Invasion"	2:15
14.	"Rose's Theme"	"The End of the World"	2:16
15.	"Song for Ten (performed by Neil Hannon)"	"The Christmas Invasion"	3:29
16.	"The Face of Boe"	"New Earth"	1:18
17.	"UNIT"	"The Christmas Invasion"	1:46
18.	"Seeking The Doctor"	"Rose", "Love & Monsters"	0:43
19.	"Madame de Pompadour"	"The Girl in the Fireplace"	3:46
20.	"Tooth and Claw"	"Tooth and Claw"	3:52
21.	"The Lone Dalek"	"Dalek", "The Satan Pit", "Doomsday"	5:01
22.	"New Adventures"	"Boom Town", "The Parting of the Ways", "The Christmas Invasion"	2:21
23.	"Finding Jackie"	"The Parting of the Ways", "Love & Monsters"	0:54
24.	"Monster Bossa"	"Boom Town", "Love & Monsters"	1:39
25.	"The Daleks"	"Bad Wolf"	3:03
26.	"The Cybermen"	"Rise of the Cybermen" / "The Age of Steel"	4:34
27.	"Doomsday"	"Doomsday"	5:11
28.	"The Impossible Planet"	"The Impossible Planet"	3:13
29.	"Sycorax Encounter"	"The Christmas Invasion"	1:13
30.	"Love Don't Roam (performed by Neil Hannon)"	"The Runaway Bride"	3:59
31.	"Doctor Who Theme (album version)"		2:31
Total length:			75:54
