= Mickey Smith =

Fictional character from Doctor Who

- Doctor Who character
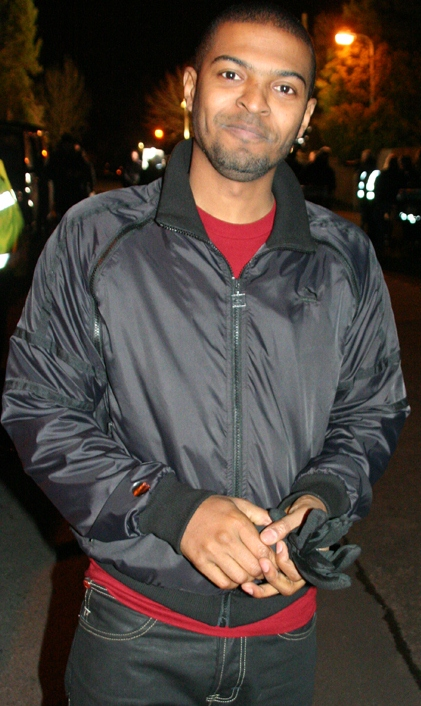
- Noel Clarke dressed as Mickey Smith on the Doctor Who set, March 2008.
- First appearance: "Rose" (2005)
- Created by: Russell T Davies
- Portrayed by: Noel Clarke; Casey Dyer (young)
- Duration: 2005–2006, 2008, 2010

In-universe information
- Species: Human
- Occupation: Mechanic
- Affiliation: Ninth Doctor; Tenth Doctor
- Family: Jackson Smith (father); Pauline/Odessa Smith (mother; status unclear); Rita-Anne Smith (grandmother; deceased); Clive Jones (father-in-law); Francine Jones (mother-in-law); Tish Jones (sister-in-law); Leo Jones (brother-in-law); Adeola Oshodi (cousin-in-law; deceased); August (son)
- Spouse: Martha Jones
- Home: Earth
- Home era: Early 21st century

Mickey Smith is a fictional character in the BBC One science fiction television series Doctor Who. He is portrayed by British actor Noel Clarke and was the show's first televised black companion. The character is introduced as the ordinary, working class boyfriend of Rose Tyler (Billie Piper), a London shopgirl who becomes a travelling companion to the Ninth and Tenth incarnations of an alien Time Lord known as the Doctor. Mickey first appears in the first episode of the 2005 revival, "Rose". Initially someone who struggles in the face of danger, Mickey nevertheless acts as an Earth-based ally to the Doctor and Rose. In the second series he joins the pair as a second companion of the Doctor's, though he leaves during the 2006 series to pursue his own adventures. He returns to aid the Doctor and Rose in the series finale later that year, and then again for the 2008 finale "Journey's End," as well as fleetingly in 2010 in the Tenth Doctor send-off "The End of Time".

Executive producer Russell T Davies created the character alongside Rose's mother Jackie (Camille Coduri) in order to provide a home context for Rose. The character's dubious personality traits were made evident; both Davies and Clarke postulated that the character "deserved to lose his girlfriend". Though Clarke felt his character was initially "a clown" he enjoyed having the chance to mature Mickey into a more heroic character in his later appearances. Television commentators generally reacted positively to this character growth. In 2007 the entertainment and media news website Digital Spy highlighted him as a "Cult Spy Icon".

== Appearances ==
=== Television ===
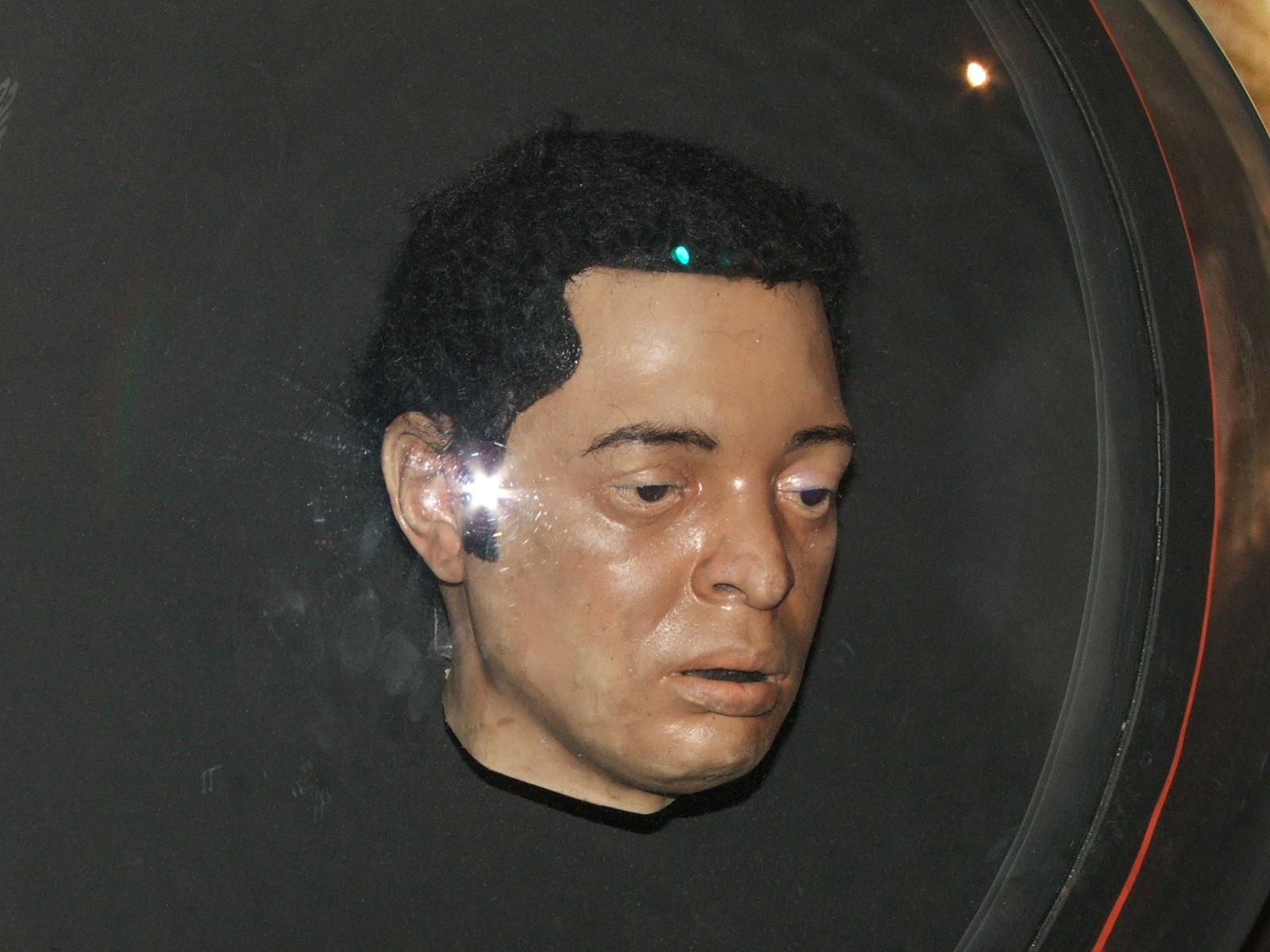
The plastic Mickey prop, on display at the Doctor Who Experience

Mickey Smith is first introduced in the series' 2005 reboot première episode, "Rose". When Mickey's girlfriend Rose (Billie Piper) begins investigating a mysterious alien called the Doctor (Christopher Eccleston), Mickey is captured by the alien Nestene Consciousness, from which a living plastic facsimile of him (an 'auton') is created. Mickey, terrified by the revelation that alien life exists, fails to impress the Doctor, who only invites Rose to be his travelling companion in time and space. In the year after Rose absconds with the Doctor, Mickey becomes the prime suspect for Rose's disappearance and becomes distressed as a result. However, he assists the pair in defeating the Slitheen, a family of extraterrestrial criminals; using his computer hacking skills, he commandeers a military harpoon missile which he targets at 10 Downing Street to kill the Slitheen. Mickey then declines an invitation from the Doctor to join him and Rose in the TARDIS. A much younger Mickey, played by Casey Dyer, appears briefly when Rose attempts to alter her childhood in "Father's Day". In "Boom Town", Mickey later meets up with the Doctor, Rose and new companion Captain Jack (John Barrowman) in Cardiff, where he helps them foil a Slitheen plot. In the series' finale episode "The Parting of the Ways", when Rose becomes stranded at home at the Powell Estate, Mickey uses a recovery truck to crack open the TARDIS's console, through which Rose is able to absorb the time vortex and save the universe from an invasion of the hateful mutant alien Daleks.

Having investigated a case of possible alien activity on Earth, Mickey alerts the Doctor and Rose to strange goings on at a school run by Headmaster Lucas Finch (Anthony Head) in "School Reunion". On meeting the Doctor's former companions, investigative journalist Sarah Jane Smith (Elisabeth Sladen) and robot dog K-9, Mickey begins to see himself negatively as the K-9 to Rose's Sarah Jane: "the tin dog". In the episode's conclusion, the Doctor finally takes Mickey aboard as his companion. He appears in the next three episodes "The Girl in the Fireplace" and two-parter "Rise of the Cybermen"/"The Age of Steel", where the trio end up in a parallel world where vicious, emotionless Cybermen have just been invented. There, Mickey is mistaken for his parallel universe doppelgänger "Ricky Smith", the leader of a human resistance group called the Preachers. In the story's conclusion, following Ricky's death, Mickey decides to stay behind in the parallel world to look after the parallel version of his grandmother (Mona Hammond) and fight the Cybermen; Mickey's grandmother is dead in his universe. However, Mickey makes a surprise reappearance in finale episodes "Army of Ghosts" and "Doomsday", wherein like the Cybermen, he and fellow Preacher Jake Simmonds (Andrew Hayden-Smith) are able to cross the Void into our world. There, they help the Doctor repel simultaneous Dalek and Cybermen invasions. In the episode's conclusion Mickey returns to the parallel world, this time with Rose who is now also trapped there.

Mickey returns again in the series four finale episode "Journey's End" (2008), along with Jackie. Alongside many other recurring characters, they have come to help the Doctor defeat Davros (Julian Bleach), the creator of the Daleks. Mickey and Jackie save Sarah Jane from a Dalek attack, and the trio then surrenders to other Daleks in order to be taken to the Dalek headquarters, the spaceship Crucible. There they join forces with Captain Jack. After Donna (Catherine Tate) defeats Davros, Mickey is one of several former companions who pilot the TARDIS. In the episode's conclusion, Mickey declines to return to the parallel universe because, having both broken up with Rose and his "parallel" grandmother having been dead, he can find no reason to go back - in fact, he tells the Doctor, "I'm not stupid, I can work out what happens next," obviously realizing that Rose will wind up with the metacrisis Doctor. Leaving the TARDIS, he follows after Jack and the Doctor's former companion, UNIT officer Martha Jones (Freema Agyeman). Mickey next makes a brief final appearance in the Tenth Doctor's final episode "The End of Time" (2010), when the dying Tenth Doctor visits all his companions and saves the now-married Mickey and Martha, "freelance alien hunters", from a Sontaran sniper.

=== Online media ===
Mickey appeared extensively in electronic literature and tie-in videos hosted by the BBC website. These websites are "in-universe", part of an alternate reality game set within the show. Concurrent with the 2005 series, Mickey ran the conspiracy theorist website "Who is Doctor Who?" (first featured in "Rose"). In the 2006 series, however, the website became "Defending the Earth". Both featured videos of Clarke as Mickey, informing the viewer of facts about the series, or introducing "missions" which would be played out in online Macromedia/Adobe Flash games. Several of Mickey's blog entries tied into the overarching Torchwood story arc, depicting interceptions by the Torchwood Institute. Games include tie-ins to the plots of 2006 series episodes, such as "Tooth and Claw" and "Fear Her".

Clarke also starred as Mickey Smith and Ricky Smith in several online 'Tardisodes'; these were 60-second webisodes and mobisodes (available online and via mobile phone download), which only aired in 2006. For the "School Reunion" TARDISODE, Mickey is researching UFO sightings online when he is blocked by a notice referring to Torchwood, prompting him to call Rose to investigate. In the TARDISODE prequel to "Rise of the Cybermen", Ricky Smith is seen viewing a message sent to all the Preachers, again on his laptop.

=== Literature ===
Mickey appears in one New Series Adventures novel alongside the Doctor and Rose, Winner Takes All (2005), and two Tenth Doctor novels, The Stone Rose and The Feast of the Drowned. These novels are set before Mickey joins the Doctor and Rose as traveling companion in the episode "School Reunion". Mickey features as the centric character in the short story "Taking Mickey" from the Doctor Who Files series of hardbacks from BBC Children's Books. In Gareth Roberts' Doctor Who Magazine comic book story "The Lodger", the Tenth Doctor is forced to cohabit with Mickey; this story was later adapted into an Eleventh Doctor (Matt Smith) episode of the same name, with Mickey's role supplanted by that of Craig Owens (James Corden). In the comic book story "The Green-Eyed Monster", Rose becomes jealous when Mickey appears to suddenly have several Amazonian girlfriends. It is later revealed that these were actors hired by the Doctor in his bid to defeat a creature that feeds on jealousy which had possessed Rose. In the ongoing Ninth Doctor comic series, an unconventional storyline sees Mickey Smith, from a time after he has witnessed the Tenth Doctor depart for his regeneration, forced to deal with mysterious events in San Francisco with the aid of the Ninth Doctor. During this storyline, Mickey takes care to prevent himself being seen by Rose or the Ninth Doctor witnessing his wife Martha, with it being implied that this sight of what Mickey would become influenced the Tenth Doctor's higher opinion of Mickey after his regeneration.

== Development ==
In accepting the role Noel Clarke comments that he "had to have a lot of faith" in executive producers Russell T Davies and Julie Gardner because he felt the series was not of high quality at the time of its previous cancellation. Mickey was created alongside Rose's mother Jackie in order to explore the question of who is left behind after a companion leaves earth to travel with the Doctor. Russell T Davies created the two characters and returned frequently to them in order to make Rose "real" and "give her a life". Whilst Billie Piper, who played Rose, felt that the character of Rose was "ruthless" in abandoning elements from her home life, Clarke commented that he felt anybody would do the same, stating "who can blame her really?" He felt that Rose's relationship with Mickey consisted of her "sitting on the couch, watching him watch football". Retrospectively viewing the episode "Rose" in 2009, Davies identifies Mickey's characterisation as "naturally selfish"—in the same vein he identifies many of his characters—drawing into question his "mysterious emails" and the fact he "abandons Rose for the football down the pub". He suggests that the character "deserved to lose his girlfriend, right from the start". Clarke feels the character of Mickey wasn't widely liked in the first series, admitting that he also saw the part as a "kids’ TV" role.

Following the production of series one, Davies took Clarke and Coduri out for dinner to discuss their contracts for the second series. Davies reveals that Clarke was excited about Mickey's development in the second series, particularly having the chance to carry a large gun and be an action hero. Clarke noted that he was "amazed" by the scripts for the second series, as he felt Mickey had at times been written as a "buffoon". He felt that the character had gotten "progressively braver" throughout the series and that as an actor he found it fulfilling that people had gone from disliking the character to saying "how they love this guy now". Mickey's character arc sees him join the Doctor and Rose as a companion, becoming in turn the show's first ethnic minority companion. (Note: Though Mickey becomes a companion in series two of Doctor Who, some sources report Freema Agyeman's Martha (introduced in the third series) as the "first ethnic minority companion" on the basis of her being "the first ethnic minority actor to play the Doctor's main companion".) Billie Piper explained that this upsets Rose initially because she "likes to keep her life separate" and "wants The Doctor to herself because she's selfish like that". Tennant stated that through his actions, Mickey "earns his spot on board the TARDIS". Clarke stated that he didn't want to focus on his status as the show's first ethnic minority companion, stating "the fact that I happen to be a black actor is beside the point, I'm an actor first". However, he felt that it provided a positive effect in that young fans of ethnic origin would no longer have to be a monster or alien when role-playing characters from the series.

"Rise of the Cybermen" and its online Tardisode prequel, set in a parallel universe, featured Mickey's doppelgänger, Ricky Smith. Clarke stated that he enjoyed the chance to play a "macho, gruff version of the character" and also to play two different characters. However, he explained that the scenes which featured both Mickey and Ricky were difficult to film as they involved green screen work, and the necessity of Clarke filming each character's part separately. A deleted scene from "The Age of Steel", suggests that Ricky was originally intended to be in a gay relationship with his co-fighter Jake. The scene, included in the Series Two DVD release, shows Jake telling Mickey that he can't replace Ricky, as he will "never have another boyfriend like him." Following Mickey's appearance in "Journey's End" the production team had intended for Clarke to join spin-off show Torchwood for its third series in 2009, but his career led him elsewhere. Reflecting on his time on Doctor Who in 2010 Clarke stated that he was happy with his character's development during the series. He comments that over the course of his appearances, Mickey develops from "a clown" into "someone with a bit more edge and a bit more stubble."

== Reception ==
Charles McGrath of The New York Times described Mickey in "Rose" as Rose's "well-meaning but dopey boyfriend". In their review of the episodes "Aliens of London" and "World War Three" Graeme Burk and Robert Smith praised the character's development stating that "by the time he faces down a Slitheen in his apartment, armed only with a baseball bat... you want him to become a regular companion." The authors felt that the character had "grown magnificently" by the time of his temporary departure in the second series, remarking favourably on his "zero to hero" arc in light of his status as the first ethnic minority companion in the televised series. By "Army of Ghosts"/"Doomsday" they contend that the character is "at last... flirtatious, smart and dashing".

IGN's Ahsan Haque praised the addition of Mickey as a companion in "The Girl in the Fireplace", writing that he "adds a new sense of discovery to the show, as the audience can easily relate to his sense of awe and his infectious excitement about being onboard a spaceship". Haque was also positive about Mickey's development in "Rise of the Cybermen" when he finds his parallel universe counterpart and his grandmother alive in the parallel universe, as Haque felt that previously "he's always been treated as a tossed-aside comic relief character that has no bearing on the story". In a review for the follow-up, "The Age of Steel", Haque believed the episode was "worth watching" to see Mickey "finally [step] up and finds a purpose" and become a hero. Ben Rawson-Jones of Digital Spy highlighted Mickey as a "Cult Spy Icon", praising his development into a hero.

In 2015 Michael Hogan of The Daily Telegraph criticised the general portrayal of male companion figures in Doctor Who. He described Mickey, alongside 2010-2012 character Rory Williams (Arthur Darvill) and 2014 character Danny Pink (Samuel Anderson) as all "basically soppy, sappy, slightly annoying plus-ones to far superior females".
