= Rose (Doctor Who episode) =

157 – "Rose"
- Doctor Who episode

Cast
- Doctor: Christopher Eccleston – Ninth Doctor
- Companion: Billie Piper – Rose Tyler
- Others: Camille Coduri – Jackie Tyler; Noel Clarke – Mickey Smith; Mark Benton – Clive; Elli Garnett – Caroline; Adam McCoy – Clive's Son; Alan Ruscoe, Paul Kasey, David Sant, Elizabeth Fost, Helen Otway, Jo Osmond, Lisa Osmond – Autons; Nicholas Briggs – Nestene Voice

Production
- Directed by: Keith Boak
- Written by: Russell T Davies
- Produced by: Phil Collinson
- Executive producers: Russell T Davies; Julie Gardner; Mal Young
- Music by: Murray Gold
- Production code: 1.1
- Series: Series 1
- Running time: 45 minutes
- First broadcast: 26 March 2005

Chronology
← Preceded by Doctor Who	Followed by → "The End of the World"

"Rose" is the first episode of the first series of the revived British science fiction television programme Doctor Who. The episode was directed by Keith Boak and written by Russell T Davies, who was also one of three executive producers. It was first broadcast in the UK on BBC One on 26 March 2005. "Rose" was the first Doctor Who episode to air since the Doctor Who television film in 1996.

In the episode, the London department store worker Rose Tyler (Billie Piper) gets caught in the middle of the alien time traveller the Doctor's (Christopher Eccleston) plot to prevent an invasion of the Earth by the Nestene Consciousness (voiced by Nicholas Briggs) and the Autons after the Doctor destroys Rose's workplace.

The episode marked Eccleston's first appearance as the Doctor, succeeding several other actors who played the role, and Piper's debut as the Doctor's travelling companion Rose. Two recurring characters connected to Rose were introduced: Camille Coduri as her mother, Jackie Tyler, and Noel Clarke as her boyfriend, Mickey Smith. In addition, an antagonist from the classic era of the show was reintroduced in the form of the Autons (whose last appearance was in the 1971 serial, Terror of the Autons). Viewers did not see the Doctor regenerate from a previous incarnation, a plot device allowing a new actor to portray the character. Russell T Davies felt it would be clearer for the viewer to begin the series with the new actor in place rather than show the previous actor regenerating.

Location filming principally took place in Cardiff, the headquarters of BBC Wales, in July and August 2004, with some location scenes shot in London in July. Studio work principally took place at the Unit Q2 warehouse in Newport in August and September. Model work was recorded at the BBC's Model Unit in London in September, and some additional filming was recorded in Cardiff in October and November.

"Rose" was viewed by 10.81 million viewers in the UK, making it the most viewed Doctor Who episode since The Creature from the Pit in 1979, and received positive reviews from critics, though there were some criticisms of its use of humour.

== Plot ==
Rose Tyler, a teenage shop assistant, is chased by living mannequins after getting trapped in the basement of Henrik's, the department store where she works. She is rescued by the Ninth Doctor, who destroys the building's roof with a bomb in order to destroy a relay device. The next day, the Doctor visits Rose at her home and is attacked by a plastic mannequin arm that he had pulled off earlier, which he and Rose subdue. Rose investigates the Doctor using a computer owned by her boyfriend, Mickey Smith, and meets Clive, who has been tracking the Doctor's appearances throughout history. Clive tells Rose that the Doctor is dangerous and that if he is there, something bad is about to happen. While Rose is talking to Clive, Mickey is eaten by a wheelie bin and replaced with a plastic doppelgänger.

The fake Mickey takes Rose to dinner and attempts to question her about the Doctor, but the Doctor shows up and beheads the doppelgänger. The Doctor reveals that he is a time-travelling alien, and that the fake Mickey was an Auton, controlled by a signal from the Nestene Consciousness. Using the doppelgänger's severed head to locate the signal, the Doctor and Rose travel to the London Eye in the TARDIS. The Doctor explains to Rose that he has a vial of anti-plastic that can be used to destroy the Nestene Consciousness if necessary. Realising that the transmitter is the London Eye itself, Rose and the Doctor descend underneath it to stop the Nestene Consciousness. They find the real Mickey, tied up but alive, and the Doctor speaks to the Nestene Consciousness. He tries to negotiate with it, but the Consciousness blames the Doctor for the destruction of its planet. The Nestene Consciousness activates all the Autons at a shopping arcade, where several shoppers are shot and killed, including Clive. The Doctor is also held down by a pair of Autons, but Rose rescues him, and the anti-plastic drops into the vat where the Nestene Consciousness resides, killing it. With the Nestene Consciousness dead, the Autons all collapse. The Doctor uses the TARDIS to take Mickey and Rose home, then persuades Rose to join him as his new companion in the TARDIS.

=== Continuity ===
Both the Autons and the Nestene Consciousness first appeared in the serial Spearhead from Space (1970), then reappeared on-screen in Terror of the Autons (1971).

== Production ==
=== Background and casting ===
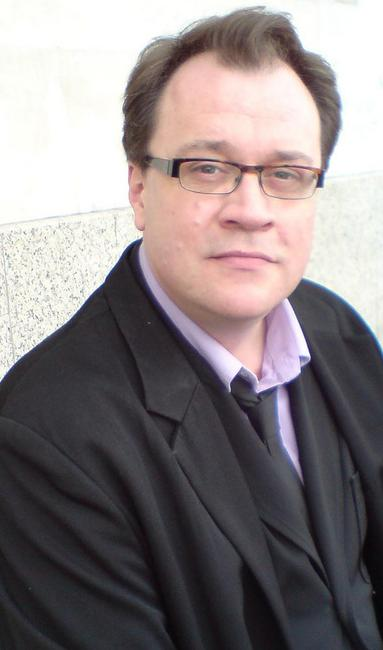
Russell T Davies, episode writer.

Doctor Who originally ran from 1963 to 1989, when it was cancelled after its twenty-sixth season. Television producer Russell T Davies had been lobbying the BBC in an attempt to revive the show from the late 1990s, and reached the discussion phase in 2002. It was announced in September 2003 that Doctor Who was returning and would be produced by BBC Wales. The format of the programme was changed to 45-minute episodes, lightening the pace. Davies was inspired by American series such as Buffy the Vampire Slayer and Smallville, in particular by using Buffy's structure of season-long story arcs around a "Big Bad" villain.

It was announced in March 2004 that Christopher Eccleston would play the Doctor. Jane Tranter, BBC Controller of Drama Commissioning, stated that casting an actor of Eccleston's reputation signaled "our intention to take Doctor Who into the 21st century, as well as retaining its core traditional values — to be surprising, edgy and eccentric." Eccleston had previously worked with Davies on The Second Coming and requested that Davies consider him for the role. Eccleston was attracted to the role as a way of shedding the image of him as a serious actor only.

Eccleston was the tenth actor to play the Doctor in canon broadcasts since the programme started in 1963. (Note: The extra actor is Richard Hurndall, who played the First Doctor in The Five Doctors (1983), after the death of William Hartnell. Also, in the time between the cancellation of the original incarnation of the series in 1989 and the 2005 revival, five additional actors played the Doctor in BBC productions which are now considered non-canon. In The Curse of Fatal Death (1999), a one-off charity special created for Comic Relief's Red Nose Day, Rowan Atkinson, Richard E. Grant, Jim Broadbent, Hugh Grant, and Joanna Lumley all played the Doctor in comedically-rapid succession. Richard E. Grant would appear again as the Doctor in an animated one-off production, Scream of the Shalka (2003), shortly before the announcement of the revival.) New actors are able to take over the role through a plot device of regeneration, introduced in 1966, in which the character of the Doctor changes body and identity. Davies decided to begin the revived series with a new Doctor rather than show the regeneration, as he believed it was "madness" to start with someone and then change him before the audience could build a relationship with him. Davies wanted to initially approach the revival as a "new programme". Eccleston's character is more "down-to-earth" than previous Doctors; Davies referred to him as "stripped down", while still having "fun and humour". Eccleston's costume of a battered leather jacket was in Davies' original pitch, but the clothing also went with Eccleston's desire not to have clothes dominating his time on the show. The Ninth Doctor's clothes do not dominate him, but rather create a simple silhouette and an "action man" vibe.

Billie Piper's casting as Rose Tyler was announced in May 2004. According to executive producer Julie Gardner, Piper, a former pop star, "fits the bill perfectly" as a "unique, dynamic partner for Christopher Eccleston". Davies described Rose as "the ordinary person who stumbles into something extraordinary and finds herself their equal." Camille Coduri and Noel Clarke were cast to play Rose's mother and boyfriend, then named Judy and Muggsy respectively; Davies wanted to include these characters to "make her real" and to "give her a life". Rose's family is working-class, which had rarely been seen in companions on the show.

=== Writing and filming ===
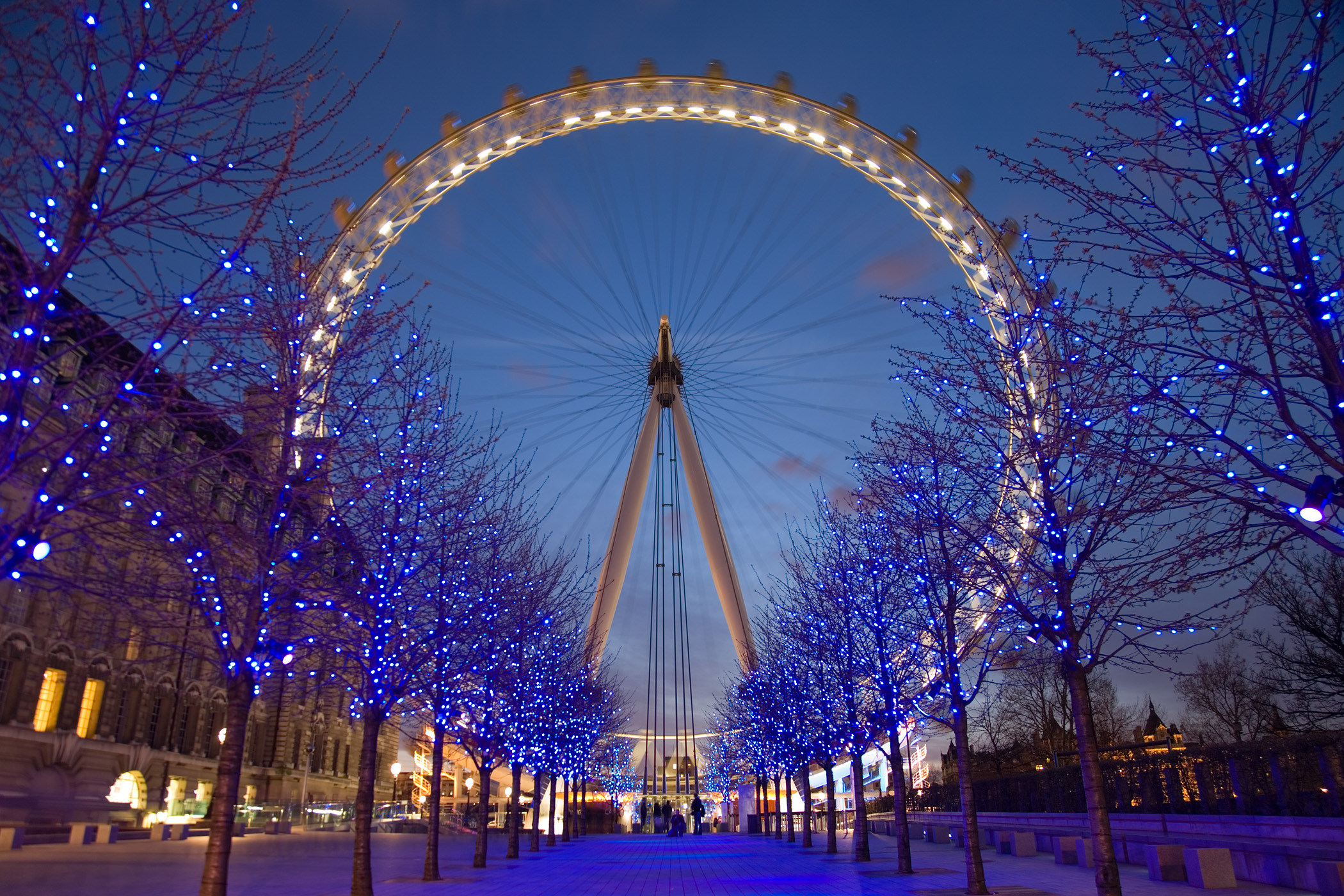
The production team was given permission to light up the London Eye more than usual for its inclusion as a plot point in "Rose".

During writing, Davies had trouble coming up with how Mickey would be captured by the Nestene Consciousness while waiting for Rose in the car, and finally realised he could be lured by a plastic wheelie bin. He commented that such instances of the ordinary being made scary made Doctor Who unique. Davies had to take out "oblique" references to the Autons being like terrorists, as the Eye was once a target of a terrorist attack. The entrance of the Doctor was much debated; Tranter and other members of the production team wanted it to be more dramatic, but the scene was never reshot. Davies remarked that it reflected Rose's point of view, whereas a more dramatic entrance would have reflected the audience's excitement at the Doctor coming back. The scene in which the Auton arm attacks in the Tylers' flat was originally much longer, but was revised. The episode originally underran by several minutes, and a scene with the Doctor and Rose walking was added a month or so later.

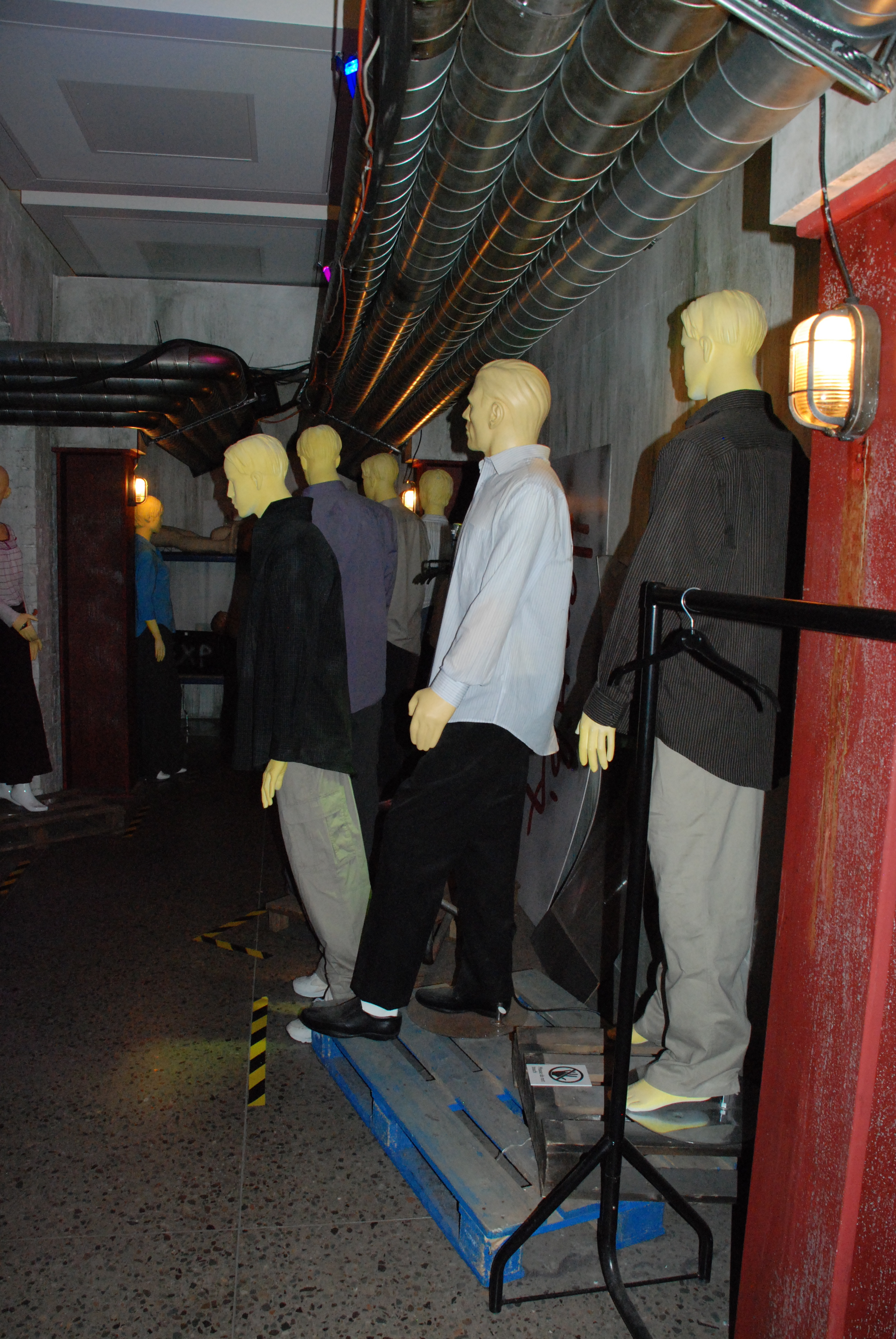
The Autons, shown here at the Doctor Who Experience

Davies wanted the Doctor to realise that Rose has something to offer to his cause. Their holding hands while running was meant to signify that they were a team, despite him not asking her yet, and they were not to question their relationship. The episode was intended to be presented from Rose's point of view. For audience identification purposes, Davies wanted the alien menace to be easily mistaken as human, so that it was plausible for Rose to do so. Davies felt that there was no need to create a new monster, as the Autons met these criteria. The Auton sequences were difficult to film because the costumes were uncomfortable for the actors, which meant that frequent breaks from filming were needed. Computer-generated imagery (CGI) was used in post-production to cover up the zipper on the back of the necks of the Auton costumes. Davies wanted to recreate the scene of the Autons breaking out of shop windows from their first appearance in Spearhead from Space, although he had the budget to actually smash the glass instead of just cutting around it like in Spearhead.

The episode was storyboarded by artist Anthony Williams. Davies offered Edgar Wright the opportunity to direct the episode, but Wright was forced to decline, as he was still working on Shaun of the Dead. Instead, the episode was directed by Keith Boak. "Rose" began filming in Cardiff on 20 July 2004, as part of the first production block alongside episodes four and five. Howells doubled for the interior of Henrik's during filming on 20 July. The Autons' attack during the climax was filmed on Working Street, Cardiff, from 20 to 22 July. In other scenes filmed in Cardiff on 21 July, a London bus and a van of the London Evening Standard drove by to give the illusion of London.

Five days were spent filming in London. While the DVD commentary said the first five days of the shoot were in London, production notes in Doctor Who: The Complete History placed London filming from 26 to 30 July. On 26 July, the production team was given permission to add more lights to the London Eye. For the scene in which the Doctor and Rose are running through London, also on the night of 26 July, careful timing was undertaken by the production team because they wanted a London bus to travel behind them, but this had to be accomplished by waiting for a bus to come. The exterior of Rose's council estate was filmed at the Brandon Estate in London from 28 to 30 July.

From 2 to 3 August, service tunnels in the basement of a hospital in Cardiff were used for the basement of Henrik's where Rose is menaced by Autons.

The pizza restaurant is La Fosse. It took the production team a while to find a restaurant that would require minimal set dressing but would be willing to close for a day. The team filmed at La Fosse on 22 August. The area underneath the London Eye where the Doctor and Rose confront the Nestene Consciousness was filmed in an unused paper mill in Grangetown, Cardiff. It underwent steam cleaning because of health and safety concerns. They were only permitted to film for three days, which required that some of the sequence be cut; originally, there was to be another Auton Mickey involved. Filming took place at the paper mill from 23 to 25 August. The scene where Rose joins the Doctor was filmed at St David's Market on 26 August.

The production team sought to film the Cardiff scenes in secrecy, but the day before they began, the Cardiff Council issued a press release naming the streets where they would be filming.

Studio filming principally took place in August and September in the Newport warehouse Unit Q2. The lift movement was recorded at Broadcasting House, Cardiff, on 11 September.

Special effects producer Mike Tucker was reminded of the James Bond film The Man with the Golden Gun when reading the scene in which the Nestene Consciousness's lair is blown up, and sought to display it as a major effect. The production team built a one-sixth scale model of the paper mill where the explosions were filmed. Tucker did a model explosion for the destruction of Henrik's as well, although that was only for the roof; the rest was done by CGI. The production team considered doing the explosion practically, but that would have been too expensive. Model work was filmed on 16mm film at the BBC Model Unit on Kendal Avenue in London from 15 to 16 September.

When the episode underran, Euros Lyn directed additional material set outside Rose's estate during the second production block, this time recorded in Gabalfa, Cardiff, on 18 October. On 10 November, Lyn directed an insert shot of Jackie Tyler at HTV's Culverhouse Cross Studio 1 in Cardiff.

In the original script, Rose's first experience of seeing the TARDIS interior was shared with the audience. Director Keith Boak, however, wanted her to exit and run around the TARDIS before entering again, at which point the interior would be revealed to the audience. This change was eventually embraced by the executive producers. Davies remarked that he originally wanted to take Rose and the audience inside the TARDIS all in one shot, but this was not feasible with the budget. This effect would later be accomplished in the 2012 Christmas special, "The Snowmen".

== Broadcast ==
=== Pre-broadcast leak ===
On 8 March 2005, Reuters reported that a copy of the episode had been leaked onto the Internet, and was being widely traded via the BitTorrent file sharing protocol. The leaked episode did not contain the new arrangement of the theme tune by Murray Gold. The leak was ultimately traced to a third party company in Canada which had a legitimate preview copy. The employee responsible was fired by the company and the BBC considered further legal action.

=== Broadcast and ratings ===
"Rose" was first broadcast in the United Kingdom on 26 March 2005 on BBC One, and was the first Doctor Who episode to air since the Doctor Who television film in 1996. Unofficial overnight viewing figures from the Broadcasters' Audience Research Board showed that the episode attracted an average of 9.9 million viewers — 43.2% of the available television audience — over the course of the evening. At its peak, it had 10.5 million viewers, a 44.3% share. The final figure for the episode, including video recordings watched within a week of transmission, was 10.81 million, third for BBC One that week and seventh across all channels. In some regions, the first few minutes of the original BBC broadcast of this episode on 26 March were marred by the accidental mixing of a few seconds of sound from Graham Norton hosting Strictly Dance Fever.

Internationally, "Rose" was first transmitted on CBC Television in Canada on 5 April 2005, debuting to strong ratings of 986,000 viewers. In Australia, it was broadcast on 21 May 2005 on ABC to 1.11 million viewers. "Rose" was first broadcast in the United States on the Sci-Fi Channel on 17 March 2006. It was aired back to back with the following episode "The End of the World"; Davies had originally wanted the first two episodes to be aired together in the UK but the request was given to the BBC too soon before transmission for the schedule to be altered. The US premiere was watched by 1.58 million viewers.

On 30 March, four days after the episode was originally broadcast in the UK, the BBC announced that another full series had been commissioned. On the same day, the BBC released a statement, apparently from Eccleston, saying that he would be leaving the role at Christmas, for fear of being typecast. The BBC later revealed this was not an official statement from Eccleston, whom they had failed to contact before responding to press questions after the story broke. Eccleston later said, "They handled it very badly, but they issued an apology and I dropped it" in a 2010 interview. After it was announced that Eccleston was leaving, the BBC said that they were in talks with David Tennant to take over the role and he became the bookmakers' favourite, with odds at 1/10 and William Hill refusing to take any more bets on who would be cast as the new Doctor. A BBC spokesman said that they had "hoped, rather than expected" that Eccleston would continue in the role.

=== Reception ===
"Rose" received positive reviews and was seen as a successful relaunch to the programme. Harry Venning of The Stage praised Davies' script, particularly for taking it seriously and making it scary. He was pleased with Piper's acting and with the character of Rose, who proved to be more independent than her predecessors. However, he felt that Eccleston was "the show's biggest disappointment" as he seemed unsuited to a fantasy role. Digital Spy's Dek Hogan stated that production values had increased from the classic series, and praised the acting of Eccleston, Piper, and Clarke, and their respective characters. However, he felt that some of the humour — such as the wheelie bin burping after it consumes Mickey — was not as enjoyable as an adult. The Sydney Morning Herald reviewer Robin Oliver praised Davies for "[taking] an adult approach to one of television's most famous characters" and "[overriding] the cash-strapped production values of the past to make his new doctor competitive in a high-tech market". Kay McFadden of The Seattle Times described the revival as "superb" and "intelligent and well-done". However, Stephen Brook of The Guardian said that it was "pitched at its youngest ever audience", and also felt that the episode had an "overdose on humour".

Retrospective reviews have also been positive. Patrick Mulkern of Radio Times gave "Rose" four out of five stars in 2013, particularly praising Rose's fleshed-out life and how it welcomed in new viewers. While he noted "minor gripes" and felt the Autons' destruction was toned down, he praised the direction and the performances and called it "a blinding success". The A.V. Club reviewer Alasdair Wilkins gave the episode a grade of B, also noting how important it was that Rose's world was shown first. He felt that some effects already seemed dated in 2013 and Jackie and Mickey were one-dimensional, but the episode succeeded above all else, especially in developing Rose and the Doctor's relationship and pointing out that the Doctor is dangerous. In 2013, Ben Lawrence of The Daily Telegraph named "Rose" as one of the top ten Doctor Who stories set in the contemporary time.

== Legacy ==
On March 26, 2020, the fifteenth anniversary of the episode, a collective fan "Watch-along" was held on Twitter. Writer of the episode Russell T Davies participated and released a prequel and sequel to the episode. The prequel was entitled "Doctor Who and the Time War", an unused story intended for Doctor Who magazine but declined for contradicting The Day of the Doctor. The story concerns The Eighth Doctor's regeneration into The Ninth Doctor (Note: Unlike the canon regeneration, in which The Eighth Doctor regenerates into The War Doctor) after the events of the Time War. The sequel, entitled "Revenge of the Nestene", was released in audio form, akin to the Big Finish range. It continues the story from the novelisation and concerns the survival of one Auton after the events of the episode. The infamous Graham Norton interruption was also recreated.

== In print ==
Rose
- Author: Russell T. Davies
- Cover artist: Anthony Dry
- Series: Doctor Who book: Target novelisations
- Publisher: BBC Books
- Publication date: 5 April 2018
- Pages: 197
- ISBN: 978-1-785-94326-3

A novelisation of this story written by Russell T Davies was released in paperback and digital formats on 5 April 2018 as part of the Target Collection. The book features deviations from the original episode such as bigger set pieces, new plot twists, and more characters. For the scene in which Clive shows Rose pictures of the Ninth Doctor to prove his immortality, the novelisation has Clive also show her previous incarnations, as well as future ones such as the Eleventh and Twelfth incarnations and Doctors that have not appeared in the series.

== Critical analysis ==
A book length study of the serial, written by Jon Arnold, was published as part of The Black Archive series from Obverse Books in 2016.

The serial was covered in number 48 of the Doctor Who: The Complete History book series, which reprinted Andrew Pixley's Archive features from Doctor Who Magazine and the various Doctor Who Magazine Special Editions, as well as new articles created specifically for the book.

== Bibliography ==
- Ainsworth, John, ed. (2016). Doctor Who: The Complete History. Vol. 48. Panini Magazines/Hachette Partworks Ltd. ISSN 2057-6048.
- Aldridge, Mark; Murray, Andy (30 November 2008). T is for Television: The Small Screen Adventures of Russell T Davies. Reynolds & Hearn Ltd. ISBN 978-1-905287-84-0.
