= Turn Left =

197 – "Turn Left"
- Doctor Who episode
- Rocco Colasanto (Joseph Long, far left), along with his family and other foreign citizens, is taken to an internment camp in the midst of the dystopia caused by the Doctor's absence. Colasanto's internment was written as a direct parallel to the Holocaust and was positively reviewed by critics for the episode's depiction of dystopia.

Cast
- Doctor: David Tennant – Tenth Doctor
- Companions: Catherine Tate – Donna Noble; Billie Piper – Rose Tyler
- Others: Bernard Cribbins – Wilfred Mott; Jacqueline King – Sylvia Noble; Joseph Long – Rocco Colasanto; Noma Dumezweni – Capt. Magambo; Ben Righton – Oliver Morgenstern; Chipo Chung – Fortune Teller; Natalie Walter – Alice Coltrane; Lorraine Vélez – Spanish Maid; Jason Mohammad – BBC Newsreader; Lachele Carl – Trinity Wells; Bhasker Patel – Jival Chowdry

Production
- Directed by: Graeme Harper
- Written by: Russell T Davies
- Produced by: Susie Liggat
- Executive producers: Russell T Davies; Julie Gardner; Phil Collinson
- Music by: Murray Gold
- Production code: 4.11
- Series: Series 4
- Running time: 50 minutes
- First broadcast: 21 June 2008

Chronology
← Preceded by "Midnight"	Followed by → "The Stolen Earth"

"Turn Left" is the eleventh episode of the fourth series of the British science fiction television series Doctor Who. It was written by showrunner Russell T Davies and broadcast on BBC One on 21 June 2008.

David Tennant only makes a small contribution to this "Doctor-lite" episode as the Tenth Doctor. The story instead focuses on the Doctor's companion, Donna Noble (Catherine Tate) and her encounters with former companion Rose Tyler (Billie Piper). The episode's narrative focuses on an alternative history where the Doctor dies during the events of the 2006 Christmas special "The Runaway Bride". The episode depicts a dystopia caused by the Doctor's death, leaving Rose to convince Donna to save the world. The beginning and end of the episode take place in the show's normal continuity, and the end features a cliffhanger that leads directly into the series finale "The Stolen Earth".

Davies' writing and Tate's performance were acclaimed, and the episode was praised for its depiction of dystopia in a scene characterised by the internment of a foreign citizen. The episode was the fourth-most-watched programme in the week it was broadcast, with 8.1 million viewers, and the Appreciation Index of the episode was 88, considered excellent. The episode was one of two Doctor Who stories in the fourth series to be nominated for a Hugo Award in the Best Dramatic Presentation, Short Form category.

== Plot ==
While Donna Noble and the Tenth Doctor are exploring a marketplace on the planet Shan Shen, the two soon become separated when Donna meets a fortune teller. Donna reluctantly accepts a reading and the teller helps her recall the events that led to her meeting the Doctor. (Note: Donna's first meeting with the Doctor is depicted at the end of the 2006 episode "Doomsday" and the start of the 2006 episode "The Runaway Bride".) Donna remembers when she was at a junction with her mother, Sylvia, looking to apply for a new job. Sylvia wanted her to turn right to apply for one job, but Donna turned left to head for another she'd already just gotten, which would lead to her meeting the Doctor. The fortune teller makes Donna imagine that she turned right instead. As she does this, a large beetle working for the Trickster attaches itself to her back.

This creates an alternative reality where she never met the Doctor and he drowns in the flood killing the Racnoss children. (Note: The flood is depicted in the 2006 episode "The Runaway Bride".) Because of his death, several of the Doctor's former companions are killed or incapacitated, and a crashing spaceship destroys London. (Note: In the normal universe, the Doctor stops the crash of that spaceship in the 2007 episode "Voyage of the Damned".) Britain is placed under martial law; the government transfers all non-British citizens into internment camps.

Throughout the events, Rose sporadically appears near Donna (but without stating her identity), and saves Donna and her family from the destruction of London, after which they are relocated to Leeds. Later, after seeing the stars disappearing from the sky, Donna decides to go with Rose, who insists that only the Doctor can stop the stars going out in every universe and the end of reality.

With the assistance of UNIT, Donna is transported back in time minutes before she would turn right. Unable to reach her past self in time, she chooses to get herself hit by a lorry, creating a traffic jam that leads to her past self to turn left instead. As Donna is dying, Rose gives her a message for the Doctor. The alternative universe disappears, and Donna wakes up in the correct universe. The beetle falls off Donna's back and dies and the fortune teller flees. Donna recounts the experience to the Doctor, revealing that Rose's message were the words "Bad Wolf". The Doctor, realising that the woman helping Donna was Rose, rushes out of the tent, finding the words "Bad Wolf" written everywhere, including on the TARDIS. The Doctor states that the universe is about to end.

== Production ==
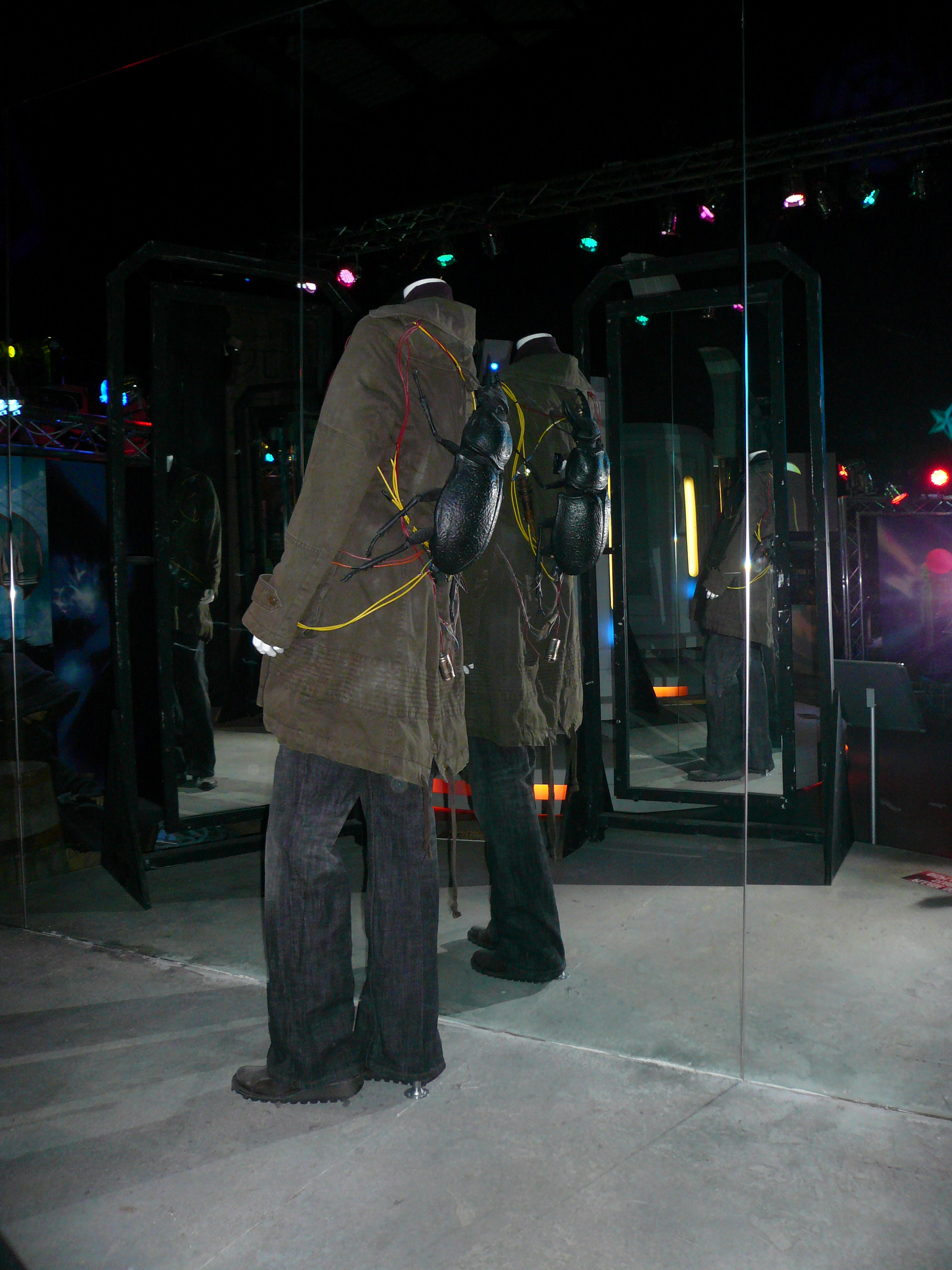
The set that Donna transports back in time and the beetle on her back, on display at the Doctor Who Experience.

=== Cast notes ===
Chipo Chung previously appeared as Chantho, the assistant of Professor Yana, in the series 3 episode "Utopia". Ben Righton also reprised his role as medical student Morgenstern, his last appearance being in "Smith and Jones".

=== Writing ===
"Turn Left" is a "Doctor-lite" episode: a means of reducing production costs that has David Tennant in a reduced role. "Turn Left" was written to complement "Midnight" which was recorded at the same time: "Midnight" featured the Doctor in the central role and "Turn Left" focused on Donna and Rose. The episode was written by the show's head writer and executive producer, Russell T Davies. He compared the main concept of the episode – life without the Doctor – to the 1998 film Sliding Doors. Davies hoped to pose a question to the viewer: "Does the Doctor cause or prevent death?" The episode focuses on the scale of deaths without the Doctor; the implicit death toll surprised Davies when he wrote the script. Tennant cited the deaths that surrounded his character as a major part of the Doctor's guilt. The episode's tone phrase was "life during wartime"; Davies reflected his description by comparing the labour camps, to which foreigners such as the Italian Rocco Colasanto (Joseph Long) were sent, to the Nazi concentration camps of World War II – most notably Auschwitz-Birkenau – through script directions and Wilf's expository dialogue:

[There's an open army truck in the street, 2 soldiers standing by. All the Colasanto family in the back - Old Mamma, 2 women and 1 man in their 50s, 1 woman and 1 man in their 30s, 2 teenagers, 1 kid. All subdued. Wilf stands back, watching. Grim.]
Donna: "Oh, but why d'you have to go?"
Mr Colasanto: "Is the new law! England for the English, etcetera. They can't send us home, the oceans are closed, they build labour camps!"
Donna: "I know, but labour doing what? There aren't any jobs."
Mr Colasanto: "Sewing, digging, is good! Now stop it before I kiss you too much - Wilfred! My capitano!"
[He gives Wilf a salute. Wilf salutes back. Both grave. Then Mr Colasanto heads for the truck. Donna goes to stand next to Wilf.]
Donna: "It's gonna be quiet without him. Still, we've got more room."
Wilf: "Labour camps. That's what they called them last time."
Donna: "...what d'you mean?"
Wilf: "It's happening again."
Donna: "What is?"
[She looks at the truck. Mr Colasanto is hugging his wife. And the pretence has fallen away. Both are crying.]

— Russell T Davies, "Turn Left" Green Shooting Script

Davies emphasised developing the characters of Rose and Donna; Susie Liggat, the episode's producer, thought Rose describing Donna as "the most important woman in the whole of creation" was therapeutic for the former character and Donna's realisation that she must die was intended as the epitome of the character's maturation.

A key component of the episode is the return of Rose, portrayed by Billie Piper. Piper's return was planned during filming of the second series; in January 2006, Piper made a pact promising to return to film several more episodes. Davies and Piper cited her other projects – specifically, her roles as Belle de Jour in Secret Diary of a Call Girl, the eponymous character in the BBC adaptations of Philip Pullman's Sally Lockhart quartet, and Fanny Price in the ITV adaptation of Mansfield Park – to explain that her departure was permanent. Davies created the expectation of Rose's return by mentioning her in dialogue and featuring Piper in cameo appearances in "Partners in Crime", "The Poison Sky", and "Midnight".

Davies started writing the episode on 27 October 2007. He was several weeks behind schedule and had to decline an appearance at the National Television Awards four days later in order to hand the script in on time. He described writing the script as "a lot harder to rip through because it needs so much construction"; he admitted that the opening scene could have been three times longer than his written version, itself longer than any opening scene he ever wrote. He was cautious that his script should not clash with Steven Moffat's two-part story "Silence in the Library" and "Forest of the Dead" – then scheduled to be aired as the ninth and tenth episodes – because Moffat's story also contained a parallel world. Davies was delayed due to the death of Howard Attfield, who portrayed Donna's father Geoff, and the difficulty of writing Rose's expository dialogue; he had to rush the script's ending to ensure it was ready to film. He finished the script on 2 November so the rest of the production team could prepare the episode for filming.

Davies explained the episode's climax – the effects of Rose's warning – in the companion episode of Doctor Who Confidential. The words caused no inherent harm; "Bad Wolf" acts as a warning sign for the Doctor, and Rose's invocation of the phrase signals that the parallel universes Rose and the Doctor inhabit are collapsing into each other. Davies declined to state whether the episode was part of the series finale; he preferred to stay out of the imminent fan debate. The episode was described by Doctor Who Magazine as "partly acting as a prelude to the two-part series climax".

=== Time Beetle ===
The "Time Beetle", which was responsible for the creation of the alternate universe, was described in the episode's script as "a huge black beetle... shiny carapace, spindly black legs moving and flexing, mandibles clacking together". Its design was influenced by the Giant Spider of Metebelis 3 that clung to Sarah Jane Smith's back in Planet of the Spiders. The beetle's normal Earth-like appearance was deliberate; prosthetic designer Niell Gorton thought that familiarity would ease the narrative and cited the cat nuns from "New Earth" and the Judoon from "Smith and Jones" as examples. The prosthetic was made using fibreglass and fitted on a harness in order not to burden Catherine Tate's performance. The episode's director Graeme Harper explained in the episode's commentary that only psychic characters such as Lucius from "The Fires of Pompeii" were aware of the beetle's existence.

The Doctor refers to this creature as one of the "Trickster's brigade"; the Trickster (Paul Marc Davis) is a recurring enemy in Doctor Who spin-off series The Sarah Jane Adventures whose modus operandi is to alter history by changing pivotal moments. Russell T Davies explicitly links the Time Beetle to this villain from Sarah Jane, and in Doctor Who Confidential, a clip from the Sarah Jane episode in which the Trickster threatens to go after the Doctor is shown. The events of this episode amount to his fulfilment of that promise.

=== Filming ===
The episode was primarily filmed in the seventh production block between 26 November and 8 December 2007, alongside filming of "Midnight". The first scenes were filmed in Bay Chambers, Cardiff; the housing office where Donna's family was relocated to Leeds was filmed in a storage area adjacent to the photocopying business. The following evening saw filming of Rose and Donna's first meeting in Butetown, Cardiff. Scenes set on "Monday 25 [June 2007]" – specifically, Donna preparing to turn at the junction, and her future self racing to ensure she turns left – were filmed between 27 November and 29 November, in the order they were aired. A double had to portray Tate in the car; Tate did not have a driving licence. Donna's race to prevent herself from turning right was filmed on St Isan Road in Cardiff, which was locked off for safety concerns. During the evenings of the 27th and the 28th, scenes on Wilfred's allotment in Leeds were filmed; and on 29 November, Rose's second meeting with Donna and Piper's cameo in "Partners in Crime" were filmed.

The first studio scene – Donna in the fortune teller's room – was filmed on 30 November 2007, on a re-dressed Torchwood Hub set at the show's Upper Boat Studios. The outdoor scenes in Shan Shen – comprising Tennant's entire contribution to the episode – were filmed on 1 December 2007 in Splott and near the Cardiff Royal Infirmary. The shoot was marred by difficulties: rain delayed re-dressing the alley from the hanzi banners and posters to the Bad Wolf versions; and several extras left at lunchtime because of a misunderstanding over their payment. The final scene filmed on the day was the Doctor's examination of the Time Beetle in the fortune teller's room. The scenes in the country hotel were filmed at Egerton Grey Country House Hotel in Porthkerry on 3 December 2007.

The scenes in the terraced street in Leeds were filmed in Machen Street, Penarth, on 4 December and 5 December. The cast listened to The Pogues' "The Wild Rover" and Queen's "Bohemian Rhapsody" before singing the songs themselves. Graeme Harper decided to focus on Jacqueline King in the scene when her character, Sylvia Noble, stares vacantly in a despondent manner as Donna talks to her; Harper considered the scene to be "Jacqueline's moment" and thought the scene would be more powerful if the focus was kept on one character. The outdoor scenes were filmed on 5 December: the Colasanto family being sent to a labour camp was filmed during the day, and the ATMOS devices ejecting exhaust fumes was filmed in the evening.

Filming continued with a night shoot on 6 December; scenes inside and outside the pub on Christmas Day were filmed in the Conway pub in Pontcanna before relocating to a nearby park to film scenes contemporary with the events of "The Poison Sky". Thompson Park was originally scheduled for the shoot; the location was changed at short notice to Sophia Gardens because Tate was suffering from a mild case of influenza. The final scenes to be filmed – the scenes in the makeshift UNIT base – were filmed in a decommissioned steel factory in Pontypool on 7 December and 8 December. Filming for the episode was completed with pick-up shots in January 2008.

Because the episode had a low budget, it relied heavily on stock footage and pre-existing graphics: the Titanic's descent into Buckingham Palace and the American television report of the populace being transformed into Adipose utilised footage from "Voyage of the Damned" and "Partners in Crime", respectively, and images of the Racnoss Webstar and the ignited sky had already been created by The Mill. The episode's small budget impeded production: Davies wanted the TARDIS prop to be on fire until he was reminded that he was writing "the cheap episode".

== Broadcast and reception ==
=== Ratings ===
"Turn Left" was watched by 8.09 million viewers – a 35% share of the total television audience – and received an Appreciation Index score of 88: considered Excellent. It was the fourth-most-watched programme of the week, the highest position a regular episode of Doctor Who had ever achieved to that point: the 2007 Christmas special "Voyage of the Damned" was the second-most-watched television program on Christmas Day; and "The Stolen Earth" and "Journey's End" were second and first, respectively. Among readers of Doctor Who Magazine, the episode was voted the second-best story of the fourth series, behind "The Stolen Earth" and "Journey's End", with an average rating of 8.81/10; and the episode was the fourth best-received episode of the fourth series among members of the Doctor Who Forum, with an approval rating of 88.0%.

=== Reception and analysis ===
==== Monsters Within ====
Stephen James Walker, a writer of reference works on Doctor Who, included an extensive analysis and review of the episode in his "unauthorised guide to Doctor Who's fourth series", Monsters Within. Walker attributed the episode's origin as an allusion to other prominent alternate history works, such as It's a Wonderful Life and Sliding Doors, and applauded the mention of the Trickster as an "unexpected but welcome cross-franchise reference". He was surprised that the format of a "companion-lite" episode followed by a "Doctor-lite" episode had not been attempted before because he thought it was an "ideal compromise". He thought that Tate portrayed the "unenlightened" version of Donna far better than in "The Runaway Bride", describing her acting as "far removed from the totally unappealing character she was to start with". Most of his analysis of Donna was in conjunction with analysis of Davies' writing; he lauded the parallels between the maturation of Donna in the fourth series and of the alternate Donna in "Turn Left" as "brilliant writing".

Walker dedicated a large portion of his analysis to Rose. He thought that Billie Piper was "distinctly below par", citing her gaunt and malnourished appearance, new hairstyle, and slight lisp as reasons why her acting was not her finest. He criticised her role in the episode as being "far less well worked out" than Donna's, being inquisitive about several concepts: why Rose was shocked when she heard the Doctor had died, but later being knowledgeable about Donna's history and destiny; whether Rose was travelling between universes or just time-travelling; why Rose herself didn't convince Donna to turn left instead of sending Donna on a suicide mission; why Rose didn't change her clothes between her appearances; and why Rose refused to tell anyone her name. He noted the allusion to the concept of the power of names previously referred to in "The Shakespeare Code", "Last of the Time Lords", and "Silence in the Library", but ultimately theorised that the reason was so Davies could set up the episode's cliffhanger.

Walker described the episode as "quite adult [for a family drama], venturing into some unexpectedly dark territory at times". He commended Davies for "highlighting the contrasting aspects of human nature" in the aftermath of the disaster: the positive side represented by Wilfred's "Blitz spirit" and the "good humoured" and "morale-boosting" sing-along; and the negative side represented by resentment from the Nobles' new neighbours, Sylvia's depression, and, most notably, the internment of foreign citizens in labour camps. He continued by comparing Colasanto's internment to Donna calling him Mussolini several scenes before; he felt that the internment cast the jibe in an "even worse light". Walker thought that the country's transformation into a fascist dictatorship was a "veiled political point" written by Davies; he cited "the population of the Daily Mail-reading home counties forced to experience living as refugees and asylum seekers" and UNIT troops aiming at unarmed civilians as reasons why the episode was "the most subversive [the show] has ever been".

Closing, Walker congratulated director Graeme Harper for demonstrating "his incredible versatility" in directing the vastly different "The Unicorn and the Wasp" and "Turn Left", and wrote that any concerns about the plot were "overshadowed" by the script's "inventiveness, intelligence, and sheer boldness". He finished by calling the episode "one of the most extraordinary in Doctor Who's long history". Walker ranked the story as his fifth-favourite episode of the fourth series, between "Silence in the Library" and "Midnight".

==== Critical reception ====
The episode received mostly positive reviews from critics, many citing the power of Tate's performance. Ben Rawson-Jones of Digital Spy gave the episode four stars out of five. Comparing it to Sliding Doors and discussing the trope of alternate histories, he thought the concept was overused, but "an intriguing endeavour" and that Davies balanced frivolity and "bleak darkness". Describing the writing as "powerful ... for a family show ... Wilf poignantly remembers the similar horrors he has experienced in the last World War". Of Piper's acting, he compared her accent to "[having] her mouth numbed with local anaesthetic".

Mark Wright of The Stage gave a favourable review of the episode. He referred to his review of "Midnight", when he said that it was Davies' best script so far and wondered if Davies would better it with the last three episodes, and wrote that the episode "possibly just nudges ahead" of "Midnight". Wright explained that "Turn Left" struck resonance with him because the episode highlighted how important the Doctor is to the fictional universe. His review praised Tate's acting as Donna before she met the Doctor as a "real character performance" which exemplified Tate's multi-faceted portrayal. His main points of criticism were the appearance of Rose and the Time Beetle prosthetic: he was "non-plussed" by Rose's reappearance, but he admitted that Piper was an "integral part of the early success of new Who"; and he thought the prosthetic beetle was "an unconvincing lump of plastic" and was reminiscent of the classic series' low budget. He closed his review by saying the episode "says as much about Doctor Who’s past as well as its future", and looked forward to the last two episodes of the series.

Travis Fickett of IGN gave the episode a 7.8/10 rating. Characterising the episode as "the quiet before the storm, the seemingly innocuous bottle episode that ends up being the precursor to a slam-bang conclusion", he wrote that the episode "gets the job done", specifically praising Tate for her ability to "carry the weight of the episode". He highlighted the cliffhanger of the scene – when the Doctor realises that Donna has met Rose, and subsequently deduces the universe is in danger – as the best moment in the episode; he wrote that it was "a great moment, and sets up a premise suitably large for Davies' farewell episodes." He criticised two major points of the episode: he thought the beetle prosthetic did not look convincing, and undermined Donna's questions of why people were looking at her back; and he thought the episode was Davies' highlight reel, reminiscent of someone reminding the viewer of an event and then moving to the next slide. Closing, he wrote that there was a sense that "something was missing from the proceedings", but commented that the episode "serves as a good set up for the two-part climax of season four".

Simon Brew of cult television blog Den of Geek said "Turn Left" was "really really good", saying that it allowed Tate and Cribbins to act more flexibly and that other supporting actors could learn from Cribbins' contribution to the episode. Brew was critical of Piper's acting, the beetle prosthetic, and that Tate occasionally acted like characters from her eponymous show. "This was still an intriguing episode, very well handled. The continual shifts in the tone of the script worked a treat, as every time it looked like things were being allowed to lighten, things once again took a turn for the worse. And it’s setting up a potentially corking concluding double bill, for not only the series, but also RTD’s four-season story arc."
