= Lorraine Vélez =

American singer and actress

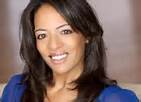
- Born: November 2, 1964 (age 61); Brooklyn, New York City, U.S.
- Occupations: Singer, actress
- Children: 1
- Relatives: Lauren Vélez (twin sister)

Lorraine Vélez (born November 2, 1964) is an American singer and actress, who has specialized in musical theatre. Her name has sometimes appeared as Loraine Velez.

== Career ==
=== Early career ===
Lorraine's first professional job was singing and acting for the Theater for the New City (TNC) in the East Village. She went on to play in Dreamgirls at the Ambassador Theater on Broadway, and she performed in the off-Broadway production of Does a Tiger Wear a Necktie? She played Leah and Sister Hilton in the original Black Nativity at the Master Theater, Young Maria in Maria de Buenos Aires at Houston Grand Opera, and Anita in West Side Story at the Lakeview Theater, Virginia. In the independent film A Day Out of Days, she took the role of Roxanne. With a production of Blues in the Night, she toured throughout Central and South America, and she sang in Japan and France.

=== West End and Broadway career ===
In 1993, Vélez moved to London, where she worked regularly for a number of years on the West End stage. She played Carmen in the original cast of the musical Fame, which opened to standing ovations at the Prince of Wales and Cambridge Theatres. Vélez recorded the title track of the Fame CD, which was released by Polydor Records. Fame also played at The Theatre Royal, Plymouth.

In addition, Lorraine played Hannah in Out of the Blue at the Shaftesbury Theatre, Lena Horne in Mama, I Want to Sing! at the Prince of Wales Theatre, and Gigi in Miss Saigon at the Theatre Royal, Drury Lane. In 1997, she featured as Heidi in the TV programme Frightmares. She then took part in the production of Rent at the Shaftesbury Theatre from 1998-2000, cast in the role of Mimi Marquez.

Vélez returned to the United States in 2000, performing the role of Mimi on Broadway at the Nederlander Theatre for almost two years. That same year, Vélez was cast as Tutu in the film Piñero, directed by Leon Ichaso, and starring Benjamin Bratt and Talisa Soto. She was a guest artist on The Rosie O'Donnell Show and HBO Latino in 2001, and in the following year she played Abby Bishop in the episode "Hitman" of the TV series Law & Order.

In 2004, Vélez moved back to London. She played Valentina Minola in the Casualty episode "Worse Things I Could Do", and the Spanish maid in the episode "Turn Left" of the cult British TV series Doctor Who (series 4, episode 11). At the Savoy Theatre in 2006-07, she played Clara and Bess, in Sir Trevor Nunn's new production of the musical Porgy and Bess. She also took part in his workshop for Gone with the Wind. The years 2008 and 2009 she spent on a Buddhist retreat in southern France. In August 2008, she sang for the Dalai Lama.

Vélez moved back to the United States, and in New York in 2011-2, she starred in Luis Caballero's Off-Broadway musical DC7, The Life of Roberto Clemente, in the role of Clemente's wife, Vera Zabala. She took the show to Puerto Rico in 2012, and in the same year was awarded the New York Latin ACE Award for best actress in a musical production. In 2014, she again starred as Vera in Clemente: The Legend of 21, in Chicago and Pittsburgh. She continues to make TV and stage appearances, and she played Claudia in an episode of Elementary in 2015.

== Personal life ==
Vélez is divorced and has one son, Joaquin, born in 1998.

== Filmography and stage roles ==
=== Television ===
Year	Title	Role	Notes
2002	Law & Order	Abby Bishop	NBC
2005	Casualty	Valentina Minola	BBC TV
2008	Doctor Who	Spanish Maid	BBC TV, episode: "Turn Left"
2015	Elementary	Claudia	CBS

=== Film ===
Year	Title	Role	Notes
2001	Piñero	Tutu	Dir. Leon Ichaso

=== Broadway ===
Year	Title	Role	Notes
1987	Dreamgirls	Stepp/Michelle	Ambassador Theater
2000–2001	Rent	Mimi Marquez	Nederlander Theatre

=== West End ===
Year	Title	Role	Notes
1993–1994	Miss Saigon	Gigi	Drury Lane Theatre
1994	Out of the Blue	Hannah	Shaftesbury Theatre
1995	Mama, I Want to Sing!	Lena Horne	Prince of Wales Theatre
1995–1996 & 1998	Fame: The Musical	Carmen	Prince of Wales Theatre. Original cast.
1998–2000	Rent	Mimi Marquez	Shaftesbury Theatre
2006–2007	Porgy and Bess	Clara, and Bess	Savoy Theatre

=== Off-Broadway & international ===
Year	Title	Role	Notes
	Blues in the Night	Girl/Woman	Nine-country tour, Central & South America
	Black Nativity	Leah/Sister Hilton	Master Theatre, NY
	Maria de Buenos Aires	Young Maria	Houston Grand Opera
	West Side Story	Anita	Lakeview Theatre, Va
2011–2012	DC7	Vera Zabala	Teatro SEA; PRTT in NY; Francisco Arrivi Theater, PR
2014	Clemente: Legend of 21	Vera Zabala	Stage 773, Chicago; Byham Theater, Pittsburgh

== See also ==
- List of Puerto Ricans-Actors, actresses, comedians and directors
