= Time Crash =

- Doctor Who charity special
- The Tenth Doctor compares his attire to his favourite incarnation's clothing, in a scene that was influenced by Steven Moffat's love of the Fifth Doctor and positively reviewed by critics.

Cast
- Doctors: David Tennant – Tenth Doctor; Peter Davison – Fifth Doctor

Production
- Directed by: Graeme Harper
- Written by: Steven Moffat
- Produced by: Phil Collinson
- Executive producer(s): Russell T Davies; Julie Gardner
- Music by: Murray Gold
- Production code: CIN2
- Running time: 8 minutes
- First broadcast: 16 November 2007

Chronology
← Preceded by "Last of the Time Lords"	Followed by → "Voyage of the Damned"

"Time Crash" is a mini-episode of the British science fiction television series Doctor Who. It was broadcast on 16 November 2007, as part of the BBC One telethon for the children's charity Children in Need. Written by Steven Moffat, it starred David Tennant and brought back Peter Davison as the Doctor.

The episode, set during the last scene of the previous episode "Last of the Time Lords", depicts a humorous encounter between the Doctor's fifth and tenth incarnations, played by Davison and Tennant respectively. "Time Crash" was praised by critics who reviewed the episode, and was a ratings success; it was the most-viewed show of the night, and briefly the most-viewed episode of Doctor Who since 2005, with 11 million viewers.

== Plot ==
The Tenth Doctor tries to take off in the TARDIS after saying goodbye to Martha Jones, only for the time machine to spin wildly and sound an alarm. Checking out the systems, the Doctor suddenly collides with his fifth incarnation, who is doing the same thing. The Tenth Doctor recognises his past self and is delighted to see him, gently poking fun at his particular eccentricities. However, the Fifth Doctor is annoyed, thinking that his counterpart is a "fan" who has somehow broken into the TARDIS.

The Doctors discover that the same TARDIS at different points in time have collided because the Tenth Doctor left his shields down. This creates a paradox that will cause a black hole strong enough to swallow the entire universe. The Tenth Doctor counters it with a supernova, a solution he remembers seeing himself perform in this same incident (a predestination paradox), making the Fifth Doctor realise the Tenth Doctor really is his future self. The Tenth Doctor reminisces as the Fifth Doctor begins to fade into a separate timeline, revealing various traits from his fifth incarnation that he retained for his tenth, and wishes him well.

As the time streams split, the Fifth Doctor calls out, warning the Tenth to put his shields up. The Titanic collides with the TARDIS.

== Production ==
The episode was first conceived by executive producers Julie Gardner and Russell T Davies, who decided to air an interstitial scene for Children in Need 2007. Gardner asked Steven Moffat to write the special, with the stipulations the scene could be shot in one day and one set, and require no CGI effects. Peter Davison was approached to reprise his role as the Fifth Doctor in July 2007, and accepted the role to impress his children. The episode was officially announced by the BBC on 21 October.

Moffat's script started by repeating Martha's departure. The script indicated that "this time, we stay with the Doctor. As before ... the Doctor takes a moment, then slam the controls," and described the Fifth Doctor as having a "frock coat, cricket jersey, and a stick of celery on his lapel". Moffat included several references to Fifth Doctor stories in his script: the Tenth Doctor commented about the Fifth Doctor's attire and his disuse of the sonic screwdriver. A line about the effects of the paradox the TARDIS collision had caused gave an explanation of why the Fifth Doctor looked far older than normal, addressing that Davison had left the role over twenty years before. The Tenth Doctor refers to Tegan Jovanka, Nyssa, the Cybermen stories Earthshock (1982) and "The Five Doctors" (1983), the Mara serials Kinda (1982) and Snakedance (1983), the Time Lords' "funny hats" from Arc of Infinity (1983), and the various Master stories during Davison's tenure.

"Time Crash" was filmed at Upper Boat Studios in Upper Boat, Cardiff, as part of the fourth recording block of the fourth series (which included "Partners in Crime") on 7 October 2007. Graeme Harper, director of Davison's final serial The Caves of Androzani (1984), directed the episode. To replicate the Fifth Doctor's attire, the production team borrowed items from the Doctor Who exhibition in Blackpool and knitted a new cricket jumper to reflect the style worn from Castrovalva (1982) to Warriors of the Deep (1984). The accompanying Doctor Who Confidential episode revealed that the trousers Davison wore in "Time Crash" were the same pair that Colin Baker wore in his early scenes in The Twin Dilemma (1984).

== Broadcast and reception ==
Previous Doctor Who charity specials transmitted over the years include Dimensions in Time, Doctor Who and the Curse of Fatal Death and the untitled 2005 special. The anniversary special "The Five Doctors" was broadcast on Children in Need night for its United Kingdom premiere broadcast.

The Children in Need telethon was the most-watched television programme of the night, with a final rating of 9.6 million viewers, and figures peaked between 8:15pm and 8:30pm, when "Time Crash" was aired, with a total of 11.0 million viewers. The episode was therefore the most-viewed since the show's revival in 2005, surpassing the revival's premiere, "Rose", which achieved a rating of 10.8 million viewers. Donations also peaked during the episode's airing. When the episode was replayed four hours later, it garnered an audience of 2.5 million viewers. This rating was later beaten by "Voyage of the Damned", which received 13.3 million viewers.

The episode was positively reviewed by critics. Martin Conaghan of TV Squad expressed the belief that the episode was "the highlight of the evening". He mainly complimented Moffat for his writing; he said that Moffat "has a knack for clever paradox-style stories, and managed to capture a fantastic little snippet of emotion, harking back to the early days of Doctor Who," specifically praising the farewell scene. Dek Hogan of Digital Spy mirrored Conaghan's beliefs; he called Moffat's script "witty" and hoped that Davison would return to film a full-length episode.
