= Doctor Who – Battles in Time =

Board game

- Doctor Who – Battles in Time #1
- Editor: Claire Lister
- Categories: Science fiction television
- Frequency: Fortnightly
- First issue: 20 September 2006
- Final issue: 13 May 2009 (Original run)
- Company: GE Fabbri
- Country: United Kingdom
- Language: English

Doctor Who – Battles in Time is a trading card game and fortnightly magazine originally from the partwork publishers GE Fabbri, who acquired the license to produce Battles in Time. The game and magazine were first released in mid-April 2006 in two 'test-regions' in the United Kingdom and was made available across the UK on 20 September 2006. The magazine was released in Australia a few months later. However, only in South Australia was it made available in newsagents; in the rest of Australia it was available by subscription with the distributor only. The subscription and back issue services have now been removed from the official website. Battles in Time magazines are no longer available and the last issue (number 70) was released on 13 May 2009.

In October 2025 it was announced that Battles in Time would be relaunched by Heathside Trading and BBC Studios to coincide with the 20th Anniversary of the original release. A reintroduction set was released in late April 2026.

== Test Run ==
The test series was run in the Westcountry and Grampian television areas of the UK at a test market to see if Battles in Time would be popular. It released 7 pilot Magazines and a "test set" version of the Exterminator card set comprising only 85 cards, plus a "test set" Super Rose. These 85 cards were essentially the same as the first 85 cards of the Exterminator set that was released nationally. However, card 42 featuring "Captain Jack" had a picture change in the national set. Test set cards are recognized as they did not include the icon, in the bottom left of the card, which would subsequently be used to identify common, rare, super rare and ultra rare cards. Also, test set information cards had a lightning icon within a triangle above the information box. This was amended for the national release to an oval shape. This can be seen, for example, in the Ultra Rare cards in the series and also the test set Super Rose card.

Complete sets of this 85 card set are very rare, particularly if they include the test set Super Rose card as there were very few test set Super Rose cards manufactured.

== The Magazine ==
Each issue of the magazine includes :

- Rules for a different game each issue (not in issues 61 onwards)
- Deck Doctor (although no Deck Doctor in issue 1)
- Deck Doctor puzzles based on the cards (since issue 61)
- Comparison between cards; e.g. Rose vs Cassandra, Doctor vs Dalek Emperor, Captain Jack vs Empty Child.
- A guide on each episode with scenarios based on the episode that can be played with the cards.
- Fold-out guides to a different monster each issue, with notes on cards that feature that monster.
- Behind-the-scenes guide to certain monsters or shots.
- Comic strip story drawn by John Ross [issues 1 to 6] and Lee Sullivan. Colours by Alan Craddock
- Artwork depicting the "Dalek Wars"
- Doctor Who themed puzzles.
- "Which hero/monster are you?" quizzes.

=== Comic stories ===
Each issue has a four-page comic story. Occasionally these are [stand-alone] stories but usually they fit into story arcs over many issues.

=== Special editions ===
Four special issues have been released (Daleks V.S Cybermen, Invader, Ultimate Monsters and Devastator). These contain several packs of cards of the current set.

== Game rules ==
Each issue of the magazine included a section with rules for different card games, and also a FAQ section in order to clarify some aspects from the previous games, specially after the release of the new sets.

In the game rules section of the official webpage are explained two different versions of the most popular variation of the game, which can be played with the cards included on the magazine or packs bought separately; the first one Bunch of Fives, and the second one Bonus Buster.

=== Bunch of Fives ===
This version excludes bonus cards, and it requires a previously made deck of 20 character cards per player. The game follows this system of rounds:

1. Both players deal five cards to themselves and leave the rest of the cards upside down on their draw pile.
2. The first player looks at all five cards in their hand, picks one of them, then one of the five attributes and finally the player calls out the green score on the card.
3. The second player checks all five cards of their hand to see if any of them can beat the card the first player has used. The second player has to use the red score in the same category. If they can't win they have to decide which card to sacrifice.
4. The winner puts his card on the bottom of their draw pile. The loser puts their card to one side so it's out of play.
5. Each player then picks a card from the top of their draw pile (both players must always have five cards at the start of each round). The winner picks the next card/category.

The game ends when one player has lost all of their cards.

=== Bonus Buster ===
This version is a variation of the Bunch of Fives game including bonus cards. In this variation, the deck should be composed of at least 15 cards per player. It is recommendable to use up to 20 cards, but both players must always have the same number of cards on their decks. The maximum number of bonus cards that may be taken on each deck is 2.

The rules in Bonus Buster follow the same structure as Bunch of Fives, but two new steps are added after steps 2 and 3. After the second step, the first player can use a bonus card if he has one in their hand. The effect of the bonus card is applied immediately after using it. Then if the bonus card played by the first player allows it, the second player makes step 3 normally, and after it, they can also use another bonus card. It is not compulsory that the first player has used a bonus card so that the second player can use one. Once the bonus card has been used, it goes with the rest of cards out of play, and the player picks two cards from the top of their draw pile.

== Card sets ==
Doctor Who – Battles in Time Card Game
- Publishers: G E Fabbri
- Players: 2
- Chance: Some
- Skills: Card playing Arithmetic; Basic Reading Ability

=== Main series ===
Set no.	Name	No. of cards	Release date	Magazine issue no. introduction	Doctor Who series based on
1	Exterminator	275	20 September 2006	1	Series 1, 2 ("The Christmas Invasion", "Attack of the Graske")
2	Annihilator	100	23 February 2007	12	Series 1, 2, "The Runaway Bride"
3	Invader	225	5 September 2007	26	Series 3
4	Ultimate Monsters	225	5 March 2008	39	Classic series, Series 1–3, "Voyage of the Damned"
5	Devastator	250	17 September 2008	53	Series 4 ("Time Crash", "Voyage of the Damned")
6	Obliterator	142 (Note: 2 super rare metal 'vortex' cards are included in the series (limited to 1 in every 720 packs), bringing the actual total to 144.)	30 July 2026	—N/a	2008–2010 specials, Series 5–15 (Note: Including all special episodes from between that period.)
7	Dalek Invasion	142	December 2026	—N/a	Classic series, revived series

=== Specials ===
Name	No. of cards	Release date	Doctor Who series based on
Daleks vs Cybermen	18 (Note: Each pack set contains 16 common cards and 1 of 4 variants of a rare card, bringing the card set total to 24 as opposed to the 18 advertised.)	16 May 2006	Series 1–3 (Note: Only episodes featuring Daleks and Cybermen.)
Adventurer	10 (Note: One pack containing all 10 cards was included with issue 62.)	21 January 2009	The Sarah Jane Adventures: Series 1–2
Retroduction	80 (Note: 72 reissues from the first five main series plus 8 new cards.)	31 May 2026	Series 1–15
The First Doctor (Note: Limited to 1000 sets.)	15	30 September 2026	Season 1–4
The Second Doctor	15 (Note: A super rare metal 'vortex' card is included in the series (limited to 1 in every 100 packs), bringing the actual total to 16.)	2026	Season 4–6
Circuit Breaker (Note: Limited to 750 sets.)	15 (Note: A super rare metal 'vortex' card is included in the series (limited to 1 in every 10 packs), bringing the actual total to 16.)	October 2026	Circuit Breaker (Note: Multimedia series.)
Christmas	48	December 2026	Christmas specials

=== Other cards ===
- A test series of magazines each containing a set of test cards from the Exterminator series were released prior to the nationwide launch of Battles in Time. Some of the cards included feature alternative designs to ones eventually used in the main series.
- An unnumbered "golden ticket" card, 'Super Rose', could only be found in 1 in every 1,000 card packs from the first five main series sets. The card itself is lenticular and features a gold foil back, differing from the standard Battles in Time card back.
- A special 'Psychic Paper' card was included issue 1 of the magazine. It features a piece of red film towards its bottom part that could be placed over certain bonus cards to reveal hidden playing abilities.
- A lenticular 'Dalek Blaster' card was included in the special Invader series introduction issue.
- 2 promo cards from the Retroduction series – 'River Song (on planet Mendorax Dellora)' and 'Rory Williams' – were released exclusively at the Comic-Con: The Cruise 2026 event on 30 January 2026.
- Larger "box topper" variants of cards from the Retroduction, Obliterator, Dalek Invasion and Christmas sets have been released as part of each respective series.

== Relaunch ==
In 2025, It was announced by Toy World that Heathside Trading would be expanding its range with BBC Studios, and the Doctor Who Battles in Time Trading Card Game will return in time for its 20th anniversary. The new range will debut in 2026 on MasterReplicas with products launching for preorder throughout the year.
