= Donna Noble =

Fictional character from Doctor Who

- Doctor Who character
- A publicity shot from the episode "The Unicorn and the Wasp".
- First appearance: "Doomsday" (2006)
- Last appearance: "The Giggle" (2023)
- Created by: Russell T Davies
- Portrayed by: Catherine Tate
- Duration: 2006, 2008–2010, 2023

In-universe information
- Full name: Donna Noble
- Gender: Female
- Title: The DoctorDonna
- Occupation: Secretary
- Affiliation: Tenth Doctor; Fourteenth Doctor
- Family: Geoff Noble (father); Sylvia Noble (mother)
- Spouse: Shaun Temple (husband)
- Children: Rose Noble (daughter)
- Relatives: Wilfred Mott (grandfather); Eileen Mott (grandmother); Iris (aunt)
- Origin: Chiswick, London, England
- Home: Earth
- Home era: Early 21st century

Donna Noble is a fictional character in the long-running British science fiction television series Doctor Who. Portrayed by British actress and comedian Catherine Tate, she is a companion of the Tenth and Fourteenth Doctors (both portrayed by David Tennant).

Originally appearing in the closing scene of the show's 2006 series and as a special guest star in its following Christmas special, "The Runaway Bride", Tate was not expected to reprise her role as Donna; for series 3 (2007), the Doctor travelled alongside medical student Martha Jones (Freema Agyeman). However, Tate expressed interest in returning to the role, and returned as a series regular in series 4 (2008), the subsequent 2009–2010 Christmas and New Year's special, and in the 60th anniversary specials in 2023.

Within the series' narrative, Donna begins as an outspoken Londoner in her mid-30s, a temp worker from Chiswick whose view of the universe is small in scope. Although she at first finds alien time traveller the Doctor terrifying, their initial encounter leaves her unsatisfied with her normal life, and she decides to travel alongside him when the next opportunity arises. Donna becomes an asset to the Doctor on his adventures and on being merged with Time Lord energy, becomes the DoctorDonna and ultimately saves the universe, albeit at the cost of the memories of her travels with the Doctor. Donna's memories are restored years later, when the Doctor returns as a new incarnation with a similar appearance, and the Doctor ultimately settles down with her and her family after bi-generating another incarnation.

In contrast to the Tenth Doctor's prior companions, who both harboured romantic feelings for him, Donna and the Doctor shared a strictly platonic relationship; and she did not feel the need to prove herself to be allowed to travel with the Doctor, who refers to her as his "best friend".

== Appearances ==
=== Television ===
Donna Noble makes her first appearance, credited as "The Bride", in the closing scenes of the 2006 series finale "Doomsday"; she appears in a wedding dress, outraged to be inexplicably aboard the Doctor's TARDIS. The scene was kept a secret until broadcast, filmed with minimal crew, and was a humorous postscript to the sad farewell the Doctor shared with companion Rose (Billie Piper) moments prior. Donna's story is picked up in 2006 Christmas special "The Runaway Bride". Donna is a temporary secretary at HC Clements in London, a security firm which, unbeknownst to her, is a front organisation for the alien-investigating Torchwood Institute. Her parents are Geoff (Howard Attfield) and Sylvia Noble (Jacqueline King). Donna discovers that she is a pawn in a scheme of the Empress (Sarah Parish) of the alien Racnoss, having been manipulated by her fiancé, Lance (Don Gilet). When the Doctor unleashes his fury upon the Racnoss, Donna snaps him out of it, and they escape together before the Torchwood facility floods. Donna is upset, having lost her job and her fiancé, and declines the Doctor's offer to become his companion, though she advises he find one. Donna does not appear in the 2007 series, but the character Wilfred Mott (Bernard Cribbins) appears in 2007 Christmas special "Voyage of the Damned"; in the 2008 series, he is introduced properly as Donna's grandfather, following the death of actor Howard Attfield.

In the series four opener "Partners in Crime" (2008), two years later, Donna has become dissatisfied with regular life and more interested in the bigger picture after her father died. When both are investigating the alien connection to Adipose Industries' Miss Foster (Sarah Lancashire), she and the Doctor are reunited, and she joins him in the TARDIS as a regular companion. In "The Fires of Pompeii", Donna shows her compassion when she argues and convinces the Doctor to save a family in Pompeii from the eruption of Mount Vesuvius. In "Planet of the Ood", Donna and the Doctor go to the Ood-Sphere and Donna defends the Ood from the abuses they suffer at the hands of humans. In the two-parter "The Sontaran Stratagem" and "The Poison Sky", Donna meets the Doctor's former companion Martha Jones (Freema Agyeman) who works for UNIT and together they stop the Sontarans from using ATMOS to choke the world. In "The Doctor's Daughter", it is Donna who names the eponymous character "Jenny" (Georgia Tennant) and subsequently convinces the Doctor to accept Jenny. The Doctor and Donna meet Agatha Christie (Fenella Woolgar) in "The Unicorn and the Wasp" and have to solve their very own murder mystery with Agatha Christie and a giant alien wasp.

The two-parter episodes of "Silence in the Library" and "Forest of the Dead" introduce River Song (Alex Kingston) and the Doctor accidentally shoves Donna into a cyber world while attempting to keep her safe from the Vashta Nerada. She then falls in love with Lee McAvoy and has two children with him. However, she discovers that the world she is in and her children are actually digital replications, the revelation severely traumatising her. "Midnight" gives Donna a break with a spa day while the Doctor has the most terrifying bus ride of his life. The episode "Turn Left" features a parallel universe wherein Donna never met the Doctor; consequently, the Doctor died, and the world comes to an end much sooner. In finale episodes "The Stolen Earth" and "Journey's End", Donna touches the Doctor's energised severed hand and is imbued with the totality of his knowledge, with which she is able to stop Davros (Julian Bleach) and his plan to destroy reality. However, because her mind cannot handle the knowledge, the Doctor is forced to wipe her memory of him against her wishes. He hopes that they never meet again, lest she remember and her mind "burn up".

Donna reappears in the two-part "The End of Time" (2009–2010). Early in the story, she buys her grandfather a book written by the episode's villain, which the Doctor takes to mean that the "DoctorDonna" is still trying to subconsciously lend a hand. When every member of the human race (apart from herself and Wilfred, attributed to Wilfred being shielded and Donna's DNA still being slightly altered after the meta-crisis) becomes a clone of the Doctor's nemesis the Master (John Simm), Donna's memories are nearly restored; however, a fail-safe installed by the Doctor protects her, as Donna generates a brief telepathic pulse that knocks out herself and the Masters in the vicinity. In the story's concluding moments, Donna is last seen when she marries new fiancé Shaun Temple (Karl Collins), becoming Donna Temple-Noble; the dying Doctor anonymously delivers her a winning lottery ticket to ensure her financial future, having borrowed the purchase price from Donna's late father in the past, making it a present from both him and the Doctor.

In "The Star Beast" (2023), Donna is reunited with the recently regenerated Fourteenth Doctor, who has the face of the Tenth Doctor. Donna and Shaun now have a transgender daughter named Rose, who comes into contact with the intergalactic criminal Beep the Meep. The Doctor is forced to team up with Donna again, although he desperately attempts to keep his old friend from remembering. With all of London in danger, the Doctor is forced to restore Donna's memories and the "DoctorDonna" in order to stop the Meep. However, Rose has partially inherited the metacrisis from Donna, stabilising her enough to survive her memories being returned. It is revealed that the metacrisis had continued to subconsciously influence Donna and Rose, resulting in Donna giving away most of her lottery winnings to charity, as well as Rose choosing to name herself after Rose Tyler and making dolls inspired by the creatures that her mother had encountered with the Doctor. Donna and Rose safely expel the metacrisis, and Donna accepts the Doctor's offer of one last trip in the TARDIS to see Wilfred. However, Donna accidentally spills coffee on the TARDIS console, sending it flying out of control. Following the ensuing chaos, the TARDIS strands the Doctor and Donna on a spaceship on the edge of the known universe in "Wild Blue Yonder". They are tormented by two shapeshifting creatures who impersonate them, and the Doctor almost leaves Donna to die aboard the exploding spacecraft after mistaking her for her doppelgänger. He realises his mistake and rescues Donna just in time. They return to London, where they are reunited with Wilf, who informs them that the world is in crisis once again and that they need their help.

Donna accompanies the Doctor to UNIT's headquarters in "The Giggle", where she meets UNIT's new leader Kate Lethbridge-Stewart (Jemma Redgrave) and the Doctor's former companion Mel Bush (Bonnie Langford). Donna helps Mel identify the brain waves affecting everyone as a musical scale. Kate, impressed with Donna's skills, offers her a job at UNIT. The Doctor and Donna battle with the Toymaker (Neil Patrick Harris), an old nemesis of the Doctor, who forces him to bi-generate, creating his fifteenth incarnation (Ncuti Gatwa) in co-existence with his fourteenth self. After the two Doctors defeat the Toymaker, Donna encourages the Fourteenth Doctor to remain on Earth with her and her family to recover from the trauma of his recent life. He accepts and moves in with the Noble-Temple family, later acknowledging to Donna that his time with them is the happiest he has ever been.

In "The Legend of Ruby Sunday", Rose helps UNIT with a case investigating S Triad Tech and mentions to Ruby Sunday that she and Donna work for UNIT now, although Donna is not present during the events.

=== Literature ===
Outside of the television series, Donna appears in some of the BBC Books New Series Adventures novels, alongside the Tenth Doctor, in stories set in between episodes of series four. Donna first appears in Ghosts of India by Mark Morris, The Doctor Trap by Simon Messingham, and Shining Darkness by Mark Michalowski in September 2008. She makes a fourth and final appearance in the novels in Beautiful Chaos by Gary Russell in December 2008; subsequent Tenth Doctor novels in the New Series Adventures range feature the Doctor travelling alone. Donna also features in a number of Doctor Who short stories, in Doctor Who Annual 2009, and in The Doctor Who Storybook in 2007 and 2009, as well as making one online short story appearance, "The Lonely Computer" (the events of which are briefly alluded to in the episode "The Unicorn and the Wasp").

The character also features prominently in comic books and comic strips featured in Doctor Who Magazine, the younger-audience Doctor Who Adventures, and Doctor Who: Battles in Time, online comic book features, comics featured in the Annual, and Storybook, as well as in two arcs of American comic book company IDW Publishing's Doctor Who ongoing series. In 2016, she would star in a fifth full book, called In the Blood, again with the Tenth Doctor, written by Jenny Colgan.

=== Audio drama ===
Donna appears in Big Finish Productions' fiftieth-anniversary mini-series Destiny of the Doctor, appearing in the tenth story, Death's Deal, released in October 2013, with Tate returning to play the role. The series was co-produced with AudioGO, who at the time held the license to produce audio productions based on the revived series.

Following the folding of AudioGO and Big Finish's acquisition of the new series license, Tate reprises the role once again in Doctor Who: The Tenth Doctor Adventures in May 2016, with David Tennant reprising the Tenth Doctor. The stories include Technophobia, Time Reaver and Death and the Queen. In 2019, Donna was featured in the third volume of the Tenth Doctor Adventures alongside The Tenth Doctor (David Tennant), Wilfred Mott (Bernard Cribbins) and Sylvia Noble (Jacqueline King), with a story featuring the Judoon.

Donna also appears in three original audiobooks published by BBC Books: Pest Control (May 2008), The Forever Trap (October 2008) and The Nemonite Invasion (February 2009).

== Casting ==
As indicated by David Tennant in his series two video diary (included in the DVD box set), the casting of Catherine Tate was kept secret; her scene in "Doomsday" was filmed with minimal crew. His series three video diary mentions that this instance was one of the few occasions where the element of surprise was successfully maintained without it being revealed in advance by the media. Tate became the first guest star to be named in the show's opening credits, which has since become common practice in the show's specials. The production team considered her character to have companion status long before the announcement of the character's return.

Executive Producer Russell T Davies at one time dismissed Donna's potential as an ongoing companion due to her abrasive personality, saying that "she'd get on your nerves". In fact, the character was not originally scheduled to return at all. Donna did not appear in his original conception of reunion episode "The Stolen Earth", despite planned reappearances from Martha, Captain Jack (Barrowman), Sarah Jane (Sladen), Rose (Piper), Jackie Tyler (Camille Coduri), as well as Mickey Smith (Noel Clarke), Elton Pope from series 2 episode "Love & Monsters", and the cast of spin-off series Torchwood. Davies originally intended the series four companion to be "Penny", a Northern woman with whom the Doctor would share a romantic attraction. After a conversation between Catherine Tate and the BBC's Jane Tranter, in which Tate expressed an interest in returning, Davies rewrote season four to bring Donna back as the new full-time companion instead.

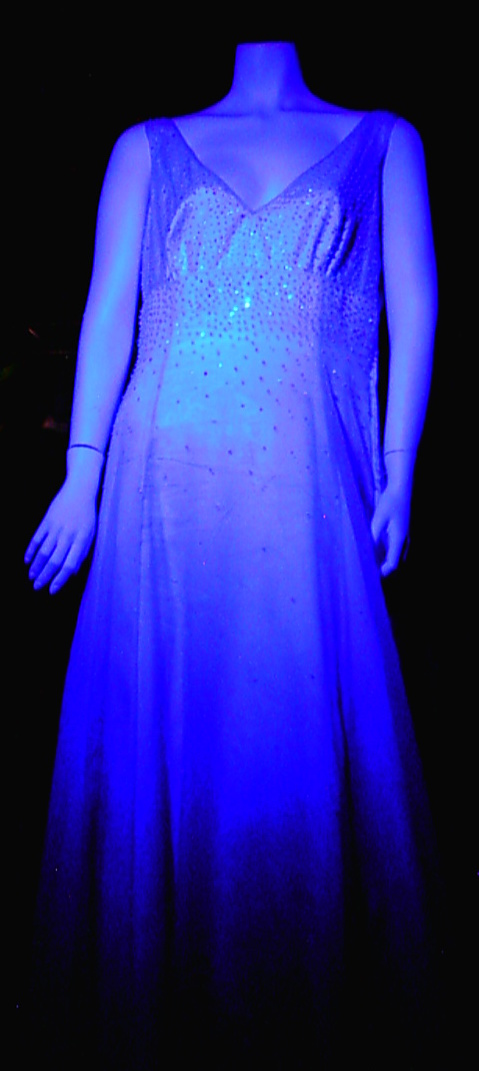
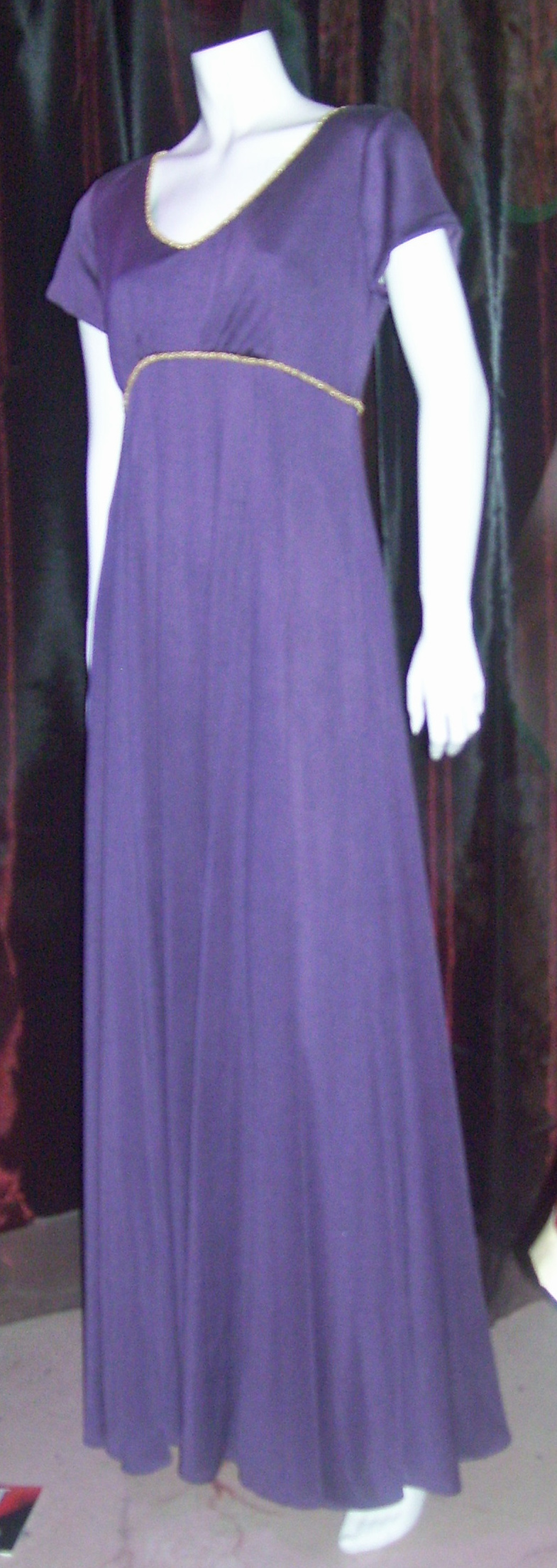
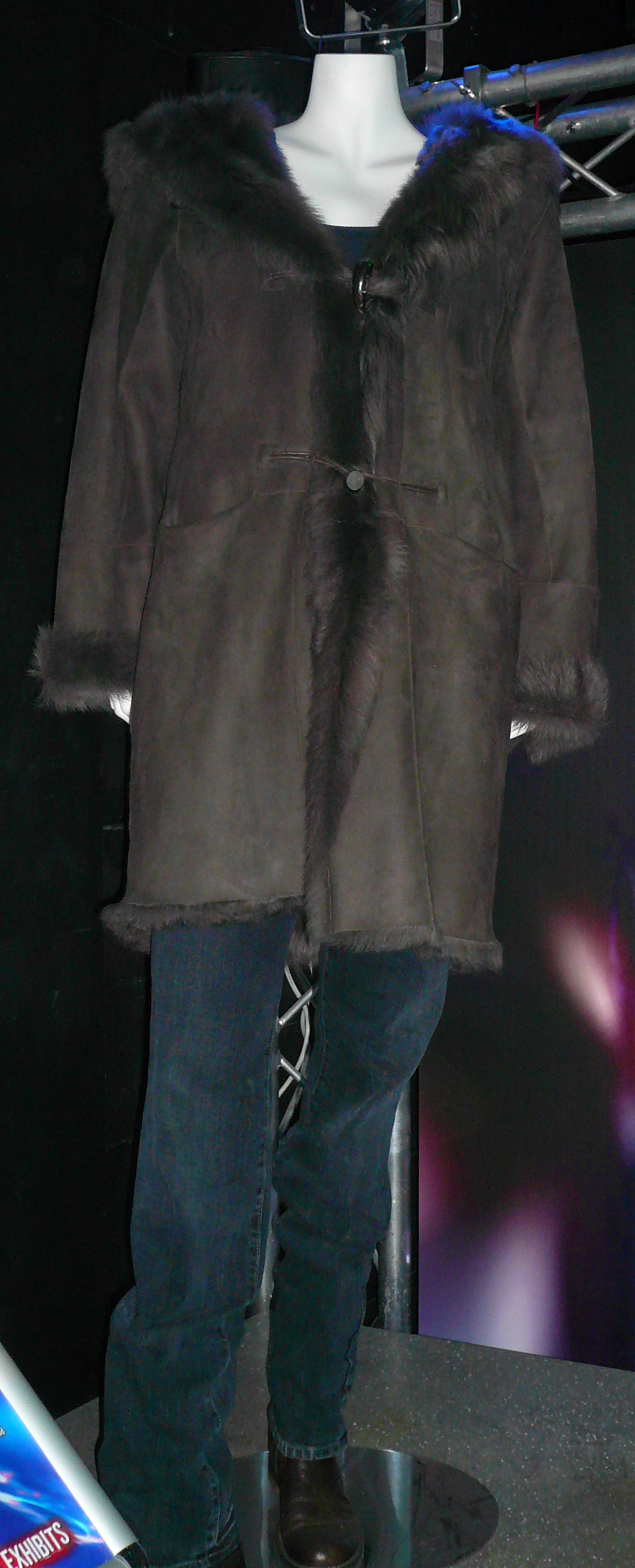
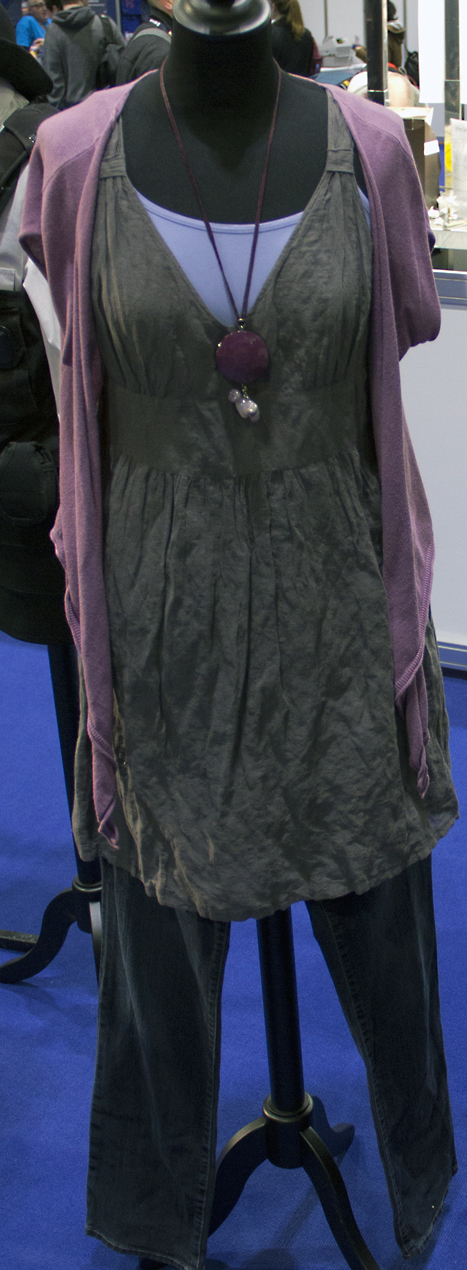
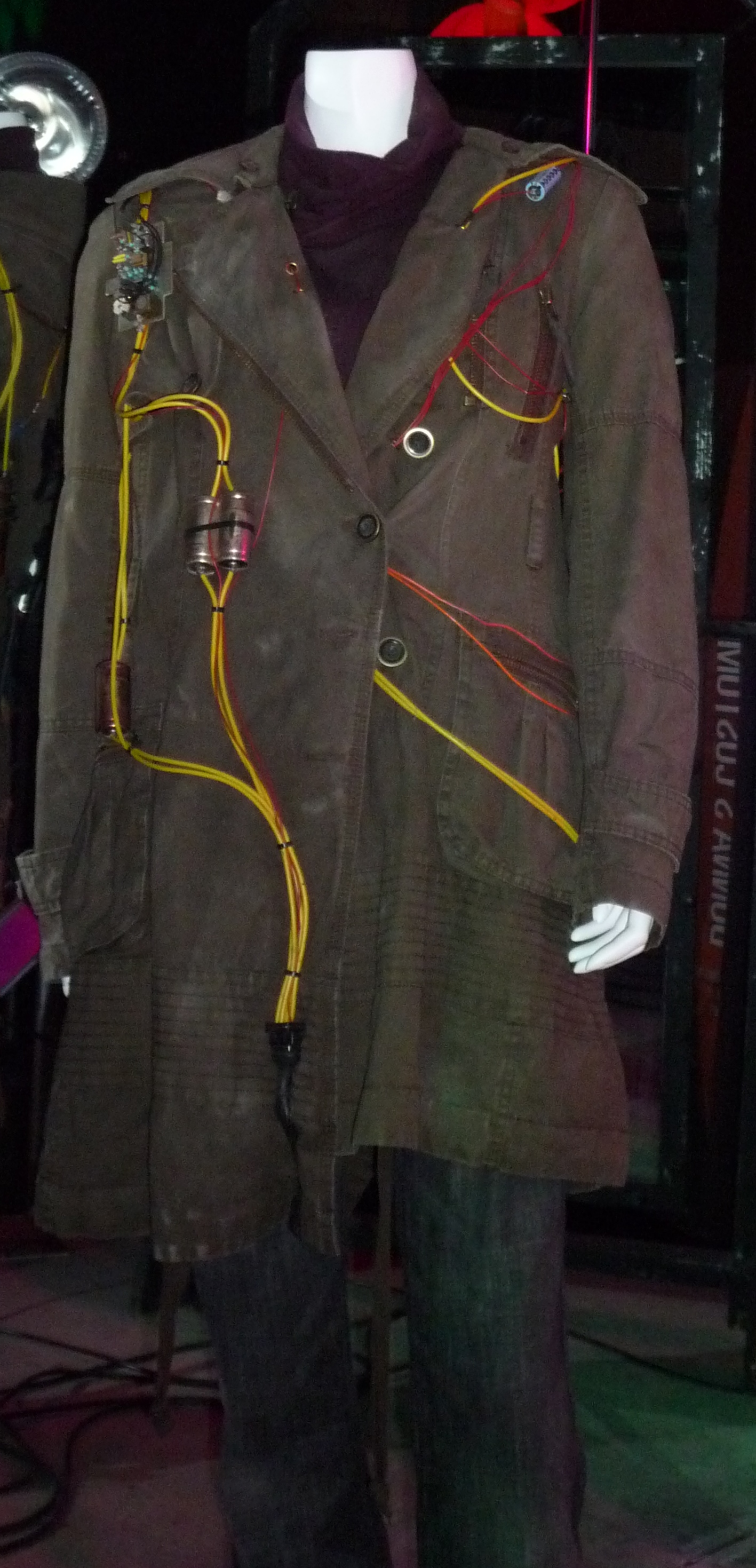
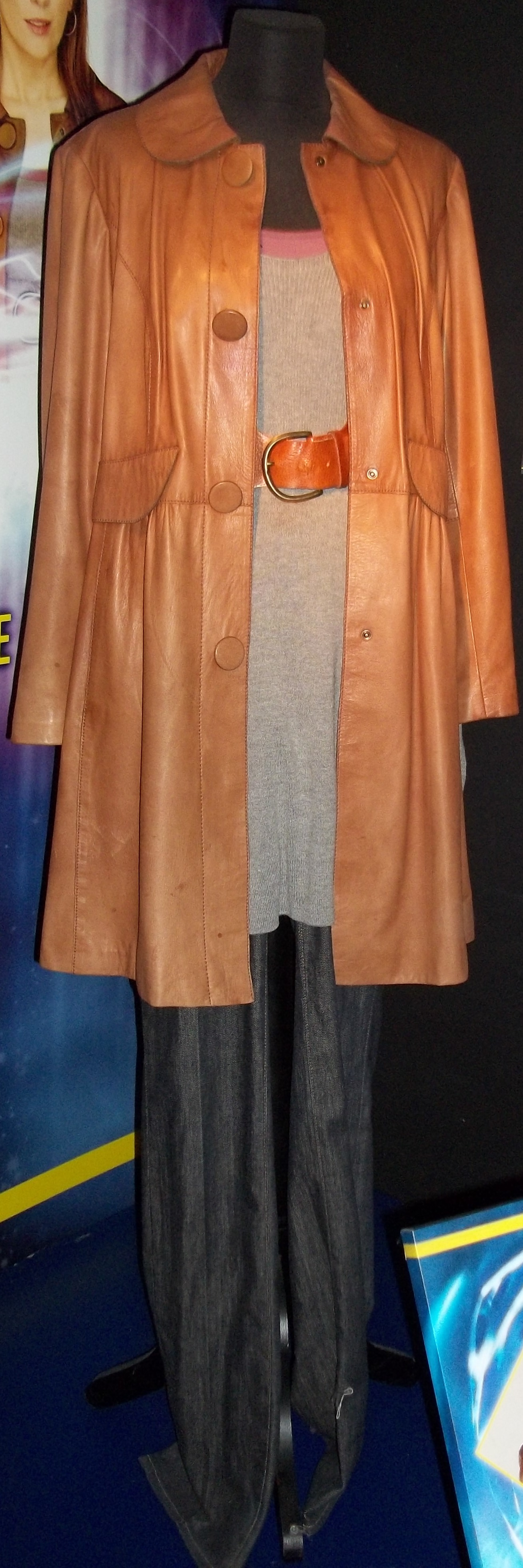
A selection of costumes worn by Donna throughout the series, on display at various Doctor Who exhibitions

Tate looked to her own full-time casting as a "gamble" on the part of executive producer Russell T Davies; Tate attributes this to being "known, by the vast majority of people, for wearing wigs and comedy teeth" (in her sketch comedy The Catherine Tate Show). The actress was grateful to Davies for casting her. She joked about the prominence eventually afforded her character: "For one brief moment I was the most important woman in the whole of the universe." Ben Rawson-Jones attributes success to the natural progression of her character, her boisterous personality being toned down for her first 2008 appearance, "Partners in Crime".

== Reception ==
Who can ever forget the sheer visual hilarity of her silent first encounter with The Doctor in 'Partners In Crime', or her attempts to blend in to the deliciously Cluedo-esque world in 'The Unicorn And The Wasp'? Then there was her paraphrased Alan Partridge homage in 'The Poison Sky', quipping "back of the neck!" after offing a Sontaran via its probic vent. Pure "wizard", as Donna would put it.

— Ben Rawson-Jones, praising the character's comedic scenes in Digital Spy.

In their review of the fourth series, Digital Spy opined, "At the core was Catherine Tate's excellent performance as Donna Noble, epitomising the intricate fusion of fun, adventure, sadness and a desire to belong." Digital Spy noted that fans initially worried about Tate's full-time casting, as she is known for her role as a comedian and comic actor. They attributed the character's success to the modification of the much more brash and boisterous character she appeared to be in "The Runaway Bride". The character's comedic elements continued ("the occasional... misfire") in the form of her tendency to shout, but Digital Spy praised many of the character's comedic moments. They highly praised Tate's crying scenes in "The Fires of Pompeii", which "gave the visually impressive episode much-needed depth", as well as her sensitivity and emotionality at the mistreatment of the alien Ood in "Planet of the Ood". Cult Editor Ben Rawson-Jones also praised the character's "tragic" scenes, such as losing her fake children and ideal man in "Forest of the Dead" and the "emotional wringer" of Donna-centric episode "Turn Left".

Donna was voted the second best companion of all time in Doctor Who Magazine Issue 414 and Issue 474.
