= Graeme Harper =

British television director (born 1945)

- Born: Graeme Richard Harper; 11 March 1945 (age 81); St Albans, Hertfordshire, England
- Education: Italia Conti Academy of Theatre Arts
- Occupation: Television director
- Years active: 1957–present
- Known for: Doctor Who

Graeme Richard Harper (born 11 March 1945) is a British television director. He is best known for his work on the science-fiction series Doctor Who, for which he is the only person to have directed episodes of both the original run (1963–89) and the revived run (2005–2025) of the programme for which he won a BAFTA Cymru and Hugo Award. Doctor Who Magazine has described him as "the longest-serving crew member on Doctor Who."

== Early life and career ==
Born in St Albans, Harper began elocution lessons at the Italia Conti Academy as a child in 1955, at the encouragement of his mother who was worried that he was developing a cockney accent. This led to him being cast as Master Bardell in an adaptation of Charles Dickens' novel The Pickwick Papers for the independent television company Associated-Rediffusion, when the company approached the academy asking if they had a boy with bright red hair for the role, and they recommended Harper.

Further television work followed in the late 1950s, appearing in children's serials for BBC Television under producer / director Shaun Sutton. From the ages of sixteen to twenty-one Harper worked predominantly in the theatre, not only as an actor but also as a stage manager. After further television work, however, he decided that acting was not the career he would like, and he would instead rather be behind the scenes. One of his main ambitions for becoming involved in the production side of the industry was to make Westerns.

While applying for production jobs in television, he worked for a time as a driving instructor. One of his pupils was the personal secretary of film director Stanley Kubrick, who arranged for him to visit the sound stages at MGM-British Studios where Kubrick's film 2001: A Space Odyssey was then being produced. During this visit, Harper briefly met Kubrick.

== BBC career ==
After hearing nothing from his various applications to the BBC, Harper wrote to his former director Shaun Sutton, who was by now Head of Drama Serials at the BBC. With Sutton's assistance Harper gained an interview for the position of floor assistant, in which role he began working at BBC Television Centre in London in September 1966.

Harper worked on various productions in this capacity, including the Doctor Who serial "The Power of the Daleks" and later the 1967 adaptation of The Forsyte Saga novels. He also worked on the Play of the Month series, where he first worked with the director Douglas Camfield, with whom he would often work in later years. In 1969 he was promoted to assistant floor manager. In 1975 he was promoted again and became a production assistant. One of the first productions he was assigned to in this role was the Doctor Who serial "The Seeds of Doom", again working under director Douglas Camfield.

In 1980, Harper once more worked on Doctor Who when he was assigned to be production assistant to director Paul Joyce on the serial "Warriors' Gate". Joyce's approach to the production resulted in various delays, and Harper had to take on extra responsibility for helping to direct the serial in order to ensure it was finished in time. Following this, Doctor Who's executive producer and producer, Barry Letts and John Nathan-Turner, endorsed Harper's application for the BBC's in-house television director course, from which he graduated in 1982.

Harper's first television directing work consisted of episodes of the medical drama series Angels. In 1983, John Nathan-Turner offered him work on Doctor Who, but as he could only employ freelance directors, Harper would need to resign from the staff of the BBC first. This Harper did, and he began working on Doctor Who in the autumn of 1983.

== Freelance work ==
Harper's first Doctor Who serial, The Caves of Androzani, was the last Doctor Who story to feature Peter Davison in the title role. Produced in late 1983, it was broadcast in March 1984. It is widely regarded by fans of the programme as one of the finest instalments of the series. Davison has been especially complimentary about Harper's direction of the story, claiming in 2009, "Graeme’s philosophy was that it needed pace and it needed energy. Graeme’s input, and the fact that it was a great script, really lifted it, I think." Davison has also claimed Harper "directed far more filmically than it had ever been done before." In 1985 he worked again on the programme, directing Revelation of the Daleks, starring Colin Baker. In 1989 he was approached to direct the Sylvester McCoy-starring Doctor Who serial Battlefield, but he was committed to episodes of the Central Television drama series Boon. In 1993 he was attached to the potential Doctor Who thirtieth anniversary special "The Dark Dimension", but this was abandoned at the pre-production stage.

Harper's other work has included episodes of Juliet Bravo (1984 & 1985), Bergerac (1985 & 1987), Star Cops (1987), The New Statesman (1987), The House of Eliott (1991–93), The Bill (1993), The Detectives (1995–97), Casualty (1997, 2004–05), EastEnders (2000–02) and Robin Hood (2006 & 2009). In 1999 his work on the television adaptation of David McRobbie's novel See How They Run was nominated for an Australian Film Institute Award for "Best Direction in a Television Drama", and in 2001 he shared in a BAFTA Children's Award win in the category of "Best Drama" for Custer's Last Stand Up. Harper directed ITV1 soap opera Coronation Street's fateful tram crash in October 2010, screened on 6 December as part of its fiftieth anniversary special. In 2012 he filmed several episodes of the Nickelodeon series House of Anubis.

In 2016, Harper directed a special Christmas episode of the BBC Two comedy-horror anthology series Inside No. 9, "The Devil of Christmas". In a deliberate attempt to emulate the appearance of 1970s British television drama, this was made using the multi-camera video, 4:3 aspect ratio production style that Harper had been used to working in at the beginning of his career.

== Return to Doctor Who ==
In 2005, twenty years after his last work on Doctor Who, he was invited to direct four episodes of the 2006 series, starring David Tennant. Having previously worked with the new series' executive producer Russell T Davies on the programmes On the Waterfront and The House of Windsor, Harper had contacted Davies soon after the announcement of Doctor Who's revival in September 2003, to say that he would very much like to work on it. Scheduling conflicts meant that he was unable to work on the first series of the revival in 2005, but for the second series in 2006 he directed two two-part stories featuring the Cybermen; "Rise of the Cybermen" / "The Age of Steel", and the series finale "Army of Ghosts" / "Doomsday". His work on the episode "Doomsday" saw him awarded the BAFTA Cymru Award for Best Drama Director in April 2007.

Harper directed two episodes, "42" and "Utopia", for the 2007 series of Doctor Who, as well as the mini-episode "Time Crash", part of the 2007 edition of the BBC's annual Children in Need charity telethon. He also directed Whatever Happened to Sarah Jane?, a two-part serial for spin-off series The Sarah Jane Adventures.

He directed five episodes of the 2008 series of Doctor Who, "Planet of the Ood", "The Unicorn and the Wasp", "Turn Left", "The Stolen Earth", and "Journey's End" and the third of the 2008–10 specials, "The Waters of Mars", broadcast in November 2009. Harper won a Hugo Award for Best Dramatic Presentation (Short form) for his work on the latter. He directed the last two stories for the second series of The Sarah Jane Adventures: The Temptation of Sarah Jane Smith and Enemy of the Bane.

== Partial credits ==
- Doctor Who
  - The Caves of Androzani (4 parts, 1984)
  - Revelation of the Daleks (2 parts, 1985)
  - "Rise of the Cybermen" / "The Age of Steel" (2006)
  - "Army of Ghosts" / "Doomsday" (2006)
  - "42" (2007)
  - "Utopia" (2007)
  - "Time Crash" (Children in Need special, 2007)
  - "Planet of the Ood" (2008)
  - "The Unicorn and the Wasp" (2008)
  - "Turn Left" (2008)
  - "The Stolen Earth" / "Journey's End" (2008)
  - "The Waters of Mars" (2009)
- Robin Hood
  - "A Thing or Two About Loyalty" (2006)
  - "Peace? Off!" (2006)
  - "Dead Man Walking" (2006)
  - "A Dangerous Deal" (2009)
  - "The Enemy of My Enemy" (2009)
- The Sarah Jane Adventures
  - Whatever Happened to Sarah Jane? (2 parts, 2007)
  - The Temptation of Sarah Jane Smith (2 parts, 2008)
  - Enemy of the Bane (2 parts, 2008)
- Hollyoaks (20 episodes, 2014–2022)
- Inside No. 9
  - "The Devil of Christmas" (2016)
  - "Bernie Clifton's Dressing Room" (2018)
  - "And the Winner is..." (2018)
