= Journey's End (Doctor Who) =

198b – "Journey's End"
- Doctor Who episode
- The Tenth Doctor and his clone re-enact the beach scene from "Doomsday", completing the on-and-off relationship of the Tenth Doctor and Rose Tyler.

Cast
- Doctor: David Tennant – Tenth Doctor
- Companions: Catherine Tate – Donna Noble; Billie Piper – Rose Tyler; Freema Agyeman – Martha Jones; John Barrowman – Jack Harkness; Elisabeth Sladen – Sarah Jane Smith; Noel Clarke – Mickey Smith
- Others: Camille Coduri – Jackie Tyler; Gareth David-Lloyd – Ianto Jones; Eve Myles – Gwen Cooper; Thomas Knight – Luke Smith; Bernard Cribbins – Wilfred Mott; Jacqueline King – Sylvia Noble; Adjoa Andoh – Francine Jones; Julian Bleach – Davros; Valda Aviks – German Woman; Shobu Kapoor – Scared Woman; Elizabeth Tan – Anna Zhou; Michael Price – Liberian Man; Nicholas Briggs – Dalek Voice; Barnaby Edwards, (Note: Miscredited as "Barney Edwards".) Nick Pegg, David Hankinson, Anthony Spargo – Dalek Operators; John Leeson – Voice of K-9; Alexander Armstrong – Voice of Mr Smith

Production
- Directed by: Graeme Harper
- Written by: Russell T Davies
- Produced by: Phil Collinson
- Executive producers: Russell T Davies; Julie Gardner
- Music by: Murray Gold
- Production code: 4.13
- Series: Series 4
- Running time: 2nd of 2-part story, 63 minutes, 30 seconds.
- First broadcast: 5 July 2008

Chronology
← Preceded by "The Stolen Earth"	Followed by → "The Next Doctor"

"Journey's End" is the thirteenth and final episode of the fourth series of the British science fiction television series Doctor Who, which was first broadcast on BBC One on 5 July 2008. It is the second episode of a two-part crossover story featuring the characters of spin-off shows Torchwood and The Sarah Jane Adventures, preceded by "The Stolen Earth", which aired on 28 June.

It was longer than the standard episode length for Doctor Who. It marked the final regular appearances of every companion introduced in the Russell T Davies era, including Catherine Tate as Donna Noble. In the episode, the Tenth Doctor and his former companions prepare to stop the Daleks' universe-destroying Reality Bomb.

"Journey's End" received mostly positive reviews, largely for the emotional core of the episode and its effect on characters. Some reviews were more mixed than the previous episode, finding the plot to be under-developed and silly. The episode was the most-viewed programme of the week, the first Doctor Who episode to receive this rank.

== Plot ==
Inside the TARDIS, the Tenth Doctor is regenerating. He halts the transformation by transferring the remaining energy into his severed hand. (Note: The Doctor's hand was originally severed from his wrist in the 2005 episode "The Christmas Invasion".) The regeneration has progressed enough to enable the Doctor's body to heal, but not change his physical appearance. Gwen and Ianto find safety in an impenetrable time lock, and Sarah Jane is saved from Daleks by Rose's ex-boyfriend Mickey and mother Jackie.

The TARDIS is captured by the Daleks and transported to their flagship, the Crucible. Sarah Jane, Mickey, and Jackie surrender themselves to get aboard. The Supreme Dalek orders the TARDIS to be destroyed, with Donna Noble locked inside; in the process, Donna touches the severed hand, causing a new, cloned Doctor to form, which saves the TARDIS from destruction.

Davros, creator of the Daleks, explains that the stolen planets form a "Reality Bomb" which would destroy all matter in every universe. To stop the bomb, Martha threatens to destroy Earth, and Sarah Jane, Mickey, Jack, and Jackie threaten to destroy the Crucible. The Supreme Dalek transports both groups in front of Davros. The clone Doctor and Donna also arrive and try to use a device to refocus the bomb onto the Daleks. Davros blasts them both with electricity. Donna resultantly becomes imbued with Time Lord knowledge that she gained during the clone Doctor's creation, and disables the bomb and the Daleks. The two Doctors and Donna relocate the missing planets, but the control panel is destroyed before Earth can be relocated. Motivated by Dalek Caan's prophecy of the Daleks' extinction, the new Doctor destroys the Daleks and the Crucible. The original Doctor offers to save Davros, who refuses. The companions flee into the TARDIS and "tow" the Earth back into its original orbit using the Cardiff Rift as a "tow rope".

Sarah Jane returns home; Martha and Mickey leave with Jack; and the Doctor returns Rose and Jackie to the parallel universe in which Rose was previously trapped. (Note: As depicted in the 2006 episode "Doomsday".) He also sends the clone Doctor into the parallel universe to accompany Rose, as the cloned Doctor is part human and will grow old with Rose. After departing, Donna's human mind becomes overwhelmed by the Time Lord knowledge and begins to deteriorate. The Doctor wipes her mind to save her life against her wishes and takes her home; informing Donna's family that Donna must never remember him or she will die. Dejected, the Doctor leaves on his own.

== Production ==
=== Writing ===
The episode is the culmination of all four series of Doctor Who produced by Russell T Davies; dialogue in the episode refers to the events of "The Christmas Invasion", in which the Doctor had his hand amputated and regrown while fighting against the Sycorax. Russell T Davies started writing "Journey's End" in January 2008. At 65 minutes in length, it was approximately 20 minutes longer than a standard fourth-series episode.

The music during the travel back to Earth's original place is the "Song of Freedom" heard at the end of "Planet of the Ood" and appearing on the series' soundtrack.

This episode's original ending involved the Doctor, following the final scene where he is alone in the TARDIS, being alerted to something on the monitor and as he checks two Cybermen rise up behind him. This was supposed to lead directly into the 2008 Christmas special "The Next Doctor", but Davies was convinced by Benjamin Cook (who was corresponding with Davies for the book Doctor Who: The Writer's Tale) to drop the scene, as he felt that a cliffhanger was not appropriate after such a sad ending.

=== Casting ===
Noel Clarke and Camille Coduri make their first appearances in Doctor Who since "Doomsday". K9 (voiced by John Leeson) makes his first appearance since The Sarah Jane Adventures story The Lost Boy, and his first in Doctor Who since "School Reunion". Some former companions return for the episode including John Barrowman, Billie Piper, and Elisabeth Sladen.

=== Filming ===
Castell Coch, situated close to Doctor Who's Upper Boat Studios, is used as the German castle. The beach at Southerndown, a few miles west of Cardiff, is used once more as Norway's fictional Dårlig Ulv Stranden (Bad Wolf Bay). Some exterior scenes, including various companions interacting with Daleks, were shot at Arcot Street, Penarth.

One significant feature of this episode is the creation of another Doctor. Unlike the multiple Doctors of stories such as The Three Doctors, "The Five Doctors" and The Two Doctors, where his previous incarnations were played by actors or depicted in old footage, this Doctor is identical in appearance to the Tenth Doctor. In the accompanying Doctor Who Confidential for this episode, Davies explains "This is so busy and so mental and so epic and universal in scale that of course you need two Doctors to solve it."

Phil Collinson, Graeme Harper, and David Tennant discuss the use of the double, a musician named Colum Regan who is a very good physical match for Tennant. Collinson explains that while with an unlimited budget they would use Tennant in every shot, "we only have a certain number of effects shots where you can see the two Doctors together, so we have to pick those carefully." Harper explained that in "two or three wide shots" they were able to use Regan and Tennant together; for the most part the double is used for scenes where one or the other Doctor is only seen from behind, or only an arm or back of the head is seen in a shot. The double has appeared in other episodes throughout the series. Tennant described the procedure for making an effects shot involving Tennant as both Doctors. The camera is locked in place while Tennant goes off and changes clothing, with Regan holding his place.

A scene filmed showed the Doctor giving Rose's Doctor a small piece of "coral" from the TARDIS so that he could grow his own TARDIS. This was removed in the last edit of the episode, but was ultimately cut because the production team felt it made the Bad Wolf Bay scene "too long and complicated" and that producing another TARDIS should not be seen to be so easy. The clip was included on the Series 4 DVD boxset. The Doctor's reply to Rose's statement of love is specified to Rose but left unheard to the audience; Davies deliberately left the reply ambiguous when he wrote "Doomsday". Executive producer Julie Gardner stated on the "Doomsday" commentary and the Doctor Who Confidential special for "Journey's End" that the Doctor requited her love.

Another additional scene with Donna was cut from the final episode: "There was an additional Donna bit after this goodbye from the Doctor, which is when he goes outside into the TARDIS, we cut back into the kitchen, and there's a moment where Donna hears the TARDIS... there's a moment of realisation, and then she turns back round and carries on talking into the phone." Gardner considered this scene untruthful and too confusing, since Donna remembering would lead to her death, and since she didn't recognise the Doctor it wouldn't make sense to assume she would recognise the noise of the TARDIS.

== Release ==
=== Broadcast ===
The episode was screened free in Trafalgar Square in London as part of Pride London 2008. The series three finale was previously planned to be shown during the 2007 event, but was cancelled as a security measure. A teaser trailer was appended to promote the 2008 Christmas Special, "The Next Doctor.

"Journey's End" was watched by 10.57 million viewers when broadcast on BBC One, giving it a 45.9% share of the total television audience. The episode was the most-viewed programme of the week; "Journey's End" is the first Doctor Who episode to receive this rank. It also received an Appreciation Index score of 91, equalling the record for the programme set by its predecessor "The Stolen Earth". "Journey's End" was the first science fiction–based series to achieve a No. 1 placing in the UK television ratings in 32 years after a July 1976 broadcast of The Bionic Woman.

The episode premiered in Canada on 12 December 2008. Although the Canadian Broadcasting Corporation (CBC) is credited as a co-producer, the CBC used a version used for international distribution that cut 21 minutes from the episode to fit it in a 60-minute timeslot with advertising. This edit removed numerous subplots as well as the final farewells by the various companions, as well as the final scene of the Doctor alone in his TARDIS. The CBC subsequently streamed the unedited version of the episode on its website.

=== Critical reception ===
The Daily Telegraph's John Preston states that this episode of Doctor Who "[a]s usual...served up a lot more than mere excitement." He credits Doctor Who's success partly to its "richly defined characters behaving in readily identifiable ways." Also of The Daily Telegraph, Sarah Crompton wrote that the episode was "exciting, incomprehensible, satisfying and slightly irritating all at the same time". Although Crompton said, "It was inevitable that the start would be an anti-climax", she praised the special effects and also noted that she would miss "the warmth and humour" that Tate brought to the series. Lucy Mangan in a humorous review for The Guardian that rewrites the dialogue between Tennant's and Cribbins' characters at the end as a discussion of the plot, described it as providing "something for everyone". In The Times, Andrew Billen called "Journey's End" "a spectacular finale that... gave the lie to the truism that more always, dramatically speaking, adds up to less."

Mark Wright of The Stage likens "Journey's End" to "one big house of cards...[that] will come crashing down" if thought about too much. However, he had no problem with the resolution of "The Stolen Earth"'s cliffhanger and is critical of those who complain about feeling cheated by the lack of a regeneration. Though he expresses that he saw little need for Mickey and Jackie in this episode, he asserts that Donna had "the saddest end for a companion ever" and praises Davies for just managing to keep the plot together. He argues that as Davies "writes the emotions and big themes so well...blow logic and rational plot moments if they get in the way!" He compares Davies's writing style to "PT Barnum showmanship" and praises both the dark and light elements of the episode. He concludes that, if not overthought, the episode remains "an audacious, big, silly, often poignant season finale".

Dave Golder of SFX says "If, while your brain is telling you, 'This is crap!' your heart is still doing backflips then it's your kind of episode." He praises the action sequences and the portrayal of Davros, Donna, Rose and the Doctor, but remarks that the overcrowding of minor characters made parts of the script seem "underdeveloped" and describes the Daleks as mostly "[c]annon fodder". "[The] plot does hang together, but only just". Overall, he describes the episode as "exceptional" but "not perfect".

Ben Rawson-Jones of Digital Spy describes the episode as "a satisfying and epic crowdpleasing conclusion" to the series and particularly praises Tate and Donna's exit. He states the episode mixes poignant and haunting scenes with "'punch the air' moments and fan-pleasing twists." Noting the episode is "not entirely flawless", he is critical of the Daleks' seemingly "too convenient" demise, arguing that it undermines their menace. Writing for the Doctor Who blog on the Radio Times website, William Gallagher called "Journey's End" "event drama" and "party television". He stated that the resolution to the regeneration cliff-hanger left him feeling "a bit cheated", but praised the episode's characterisation, concluding that David Tennant "has been the best Doctor of them all" and that "Doctor Who is the best drama on TV: it's the one with most verve and spark and exuberant excitement."

IGN's Travis Fickett gave a negative review of this episode, claiming 'it misses the mark in almost every way' and 'plays like the most outrageous of fan fiction.' He claimed the Meta-Crisis Doctor and Doctor-Donna 'stretch credulity so far that it becomes translucent', and that 'it's sort of silly to even bring Rose back when you've got the episode stuffed with almost every other character from the series'.

A poll conducted by Radio Times in 2015 found that readers voted the series four finale as the greatest series finale of Doctor Who.

Billie Piper publicly stated that she was disappointed with the conclusion of Rose's character arc. Writing for Comic Book Resources Brian Power agreed with Piper and felt that the ending was out of character for Rose.
