= Upper Boat =

Coordinates: 51°34′39″N 3°17′14″W

Upper Boat: Welsh: Glan-bad
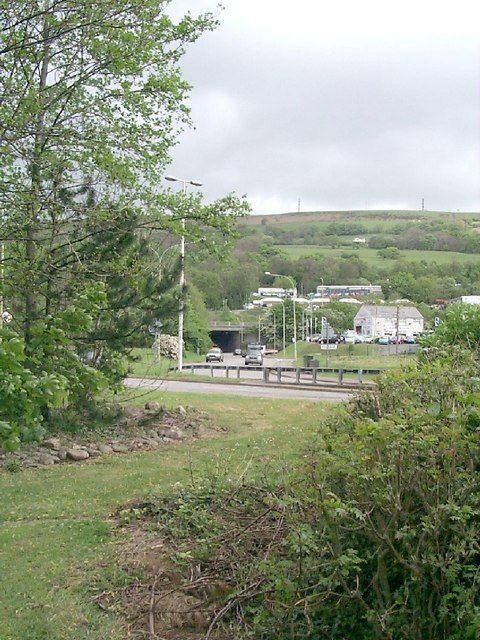
- Upper Boat roundabout, Treforest Industrial Estate

- Location within Rhondda Cynon Taf
- OS grid reference: ST108872
- Principal area: Rhondda Cynon Taf
- Preserved county: Mid Glamorgan
- Country: Wales
- Sovereign state: United Kingdom
- Post town: PONTYPRIDD
- Postcode district: CF37
- Dialling code: 01443
- Police: South Wales
- Fire: South Wales
- Ambulance: Welsh
- UK Parliament: Pontypridd
- Senedd Cymru – Welsh Parliament: Pontypridd, South Wales Central Electoral Region

Upper Boat (Welsh: Glan-bad) is a village on the southernmost outskirts of the town of Pontypridd, within the electoral ward of Hawthorn, Rhondda Cynon Taf, Wales, and comprises part of the Treforest Industrial Estate. Historically part of Glamorgan, it fell within the parish of Eglwysilan.

== Etymology ==
The location which is now referred to as Upper Boat was once a ferry point over the River Taff. There were three major ferrying points over the river, one at Taff's Well, a second at Willowford, and the 'upper boat' was moored where today the Upper Boat Inn is located.

== History ==
Founded as a ford point across the River Taff, Upper Boat was mainly untouched by the booming coal and steel industry around which much of the industrialised south Wales grew. When the Glamorganshire Canal was constructed in the late 18th century, Upper Boat found itself located between the Taff and the canal, which brought employment to the area. In the 1841 census, Upper Boat had a population of around 150, and its industry was clearly connected to the waterways that border it; employing boatmen, lock keepers, and carpenters. Others found work at the collieries that opened in neighbouring villages, or at the local Melin-gorwg iron foundry.

As no major coal mine was sunk in the locality of Upper Boat, its growth was gradual; and by 1901, its population had increased to little over 300. With the canal and the foundry now in decline, almost all employment in the village was reliant on coal mining, with people commuting to nearby pits. In 1902, the construction of the Upper Boat power station was initiated by the South Wales Electric Company. Located on the west bank of the Taff, the coal-fired power station provided employment for several decades, until it was decommissioned in 1972, and then demolished in 1976, following events linked to the nationalisation of the electricity supply industry in Britain.

In 1936, the Treforest Industrial Estate was conceived; to bring employment to the area. By the end of the following year, three factories were built, employing 69 people. As the estate grew, the fields surrounding the area were consumed by urban sprawl; housing was quickly required for local employees. Prefabricated houses were hastily built, and the village grew, but the decision to build the A470 trunk road in the early 1970s across the north of Upper Boat saw these homes removed via a compulsory demolition order.

Upper Boat was once served by two separate railway stations on different lines. The first (which was called Upper Boat Halt after 1924), on the Pontypridd, Caerphilly and Newport Railway, was opened in 1904, and closed in 1956. The second (called 'Upper Boat' throughout its life), was on the Cardiff Railway, opening in 1911, and closing in 1931. The nearest station is now Treforest Estate.

== Buildings of note ==
Built in 1839, Upper Boat was home to Carmel Welsh Calvinistic Methodist Chapel, which serve the community for over a century. Described as being designed in the simple round-headed style, the chapel closed in 1987.

From 2006 to 2012, Upper Boat was known in media circles for being home to BBC Wales' Upper Boat Studios, where the hit revised version of Doctor Who, as well as spin-offs Torchwood and The Sarah Jane Adventures, were produced, before production moved to BBC Wales new complex at Roath Lock, Cardiff.
