= The Unicorn and the Wasp =

194 – "The Unicorn and the Wasp"
- Doctor Who episode

Cast
- Doctor: David Tennant – Tenth Doctor
- Companion: Catherine Tate – Donna Noble
- Others: Fenella Woolgar – Agatha Christie; Felicity Kendal – Lady Eddison; Tom Goodman-Hill – Reverend Golightly; Christopher Benjamin – Colonel Hugh; Felicity Jones – Robina Redmond; Adam Rayner – Roger Curbishley; David Quilter – Greeves; Daniel King – Davenport; Ian Barritt – Professor Peach; Leena Dhingra – Miss Chandrakala; Charlotte Eaton – Mrs Hart; Alexander McDonald – Footman (uncredited)

Production
- Directed by: Graeme Harper
- Written by: Gareth Roberts
- Produced by: Susie Liggat
- Executive producers: Russell T Davies; Julie Gardner; Phil Collinson
- Music by: Murray Gold
- Production code: 4.7
- Series: Series 4
- Running time: 45 minutes
- First broadcast: 17 May 2008

Chronology
← Preceded by "The Doctor's Daughter"	Followed by → "Silence in the Library"

"The Unicorn and the Wasp" is the seventh episode of the fourth series of the revived British science fiction television series Doctor Who, which was aired on BBC One on 17 May 2008.

Set in an English manor house in 1926, shortly before the disappearance of crime fiction novelist Agatha Christie, the episode is a murder-mystery storyline where a shapeshifting giant wasp, in disguise as one of the party guests, murders the other guests using methods similar to those in the novels of Christie, who is also a guest.

== Plot ==
The Tenth Doctor and Donna Noble invite themselves to a dinner party hosted by Lady Eddison in 1926. Learning one of the guests is Agatha Christie, the Doctor realises that they have arrived on the day she inexplicably disappears. Upon learning another of the guests, Professor Peach, had been killed in the library, the Doctor and Donna pass themselves off as investigators and find a fragment of a burnt birth certificate. Investigating further with Agatha, she and Donna find a toolkit and deduce a jewel thief called the "Unicorn" has infiltrated the party.

While searching a room that Lady Eddison shut herself in for six months in 1886, Donna is attacked by a giant wasp, which escapes and later kills the housekeeper, Miss Chandrakala. The Doctor, Donna, and Agatha chase the alien but it returns to human form before they can catch it. Regrouping in the study, the Doctor identifies the wasp as an alien called a Vespiform before he is poisoned with cyanide. With Donna and Agatha's help, he successfully uses his Time Lord physiology to detoxify himself. Later that night, the Doctor attempts to expose the Vespiform, but a thunderstorm knocks out the power, leading to Eddison's necklace being stolen and her son Roger Curbishley being killed in the darkness.

The Doctor and Agatha gather the remaining guests and expose two of them, Robina Redmond and Reverend Golightly, as the Unicorn and the Vespiform respectively. The Doctor deduces Eddison shut herself away in 1886 because she had fallen in love with and became impregnated by another Vespiform in India a year prior. Before he died in a flood, he gave her a necklace, which telepathically linked her to their child, Golightly. Unaware of this, an ashamed Eddison gave him up for adoption. By adulthood, Golightly discovered his true nature and, using knowledge from Agatha's books that he absorbed due to the necklace, sought revenge on Eddison for denying him the truth.

Enraged, Golightly transforms and threatens the guests. However, Agatha grabs the necklace and lures him to the nearby Silent Pool, with the Doctor and Donna in close pursuit. Once they stop, Donna grabs the necklace and throws it into the water, prompting Golightly to dive in after it, drowning himself. Due to her own connection to the necklace, Agatha falls unconscious and suffers amnesia. The Doctor and Donna quietly drop off Agatha at “The Harrogate Hotel” (in fact, the Harrogate Hydro, now the Old Swan Hotel) ten days later.

== Production ==
=== Writing ===
The episode is written by Gareth Roberts, who previously wrote the pseudohistorical episode "The Shakespeare Code". Roberts was given a fourth series episode to write after executive producer Russell T Davies reviewed Roberts' script for "The Shakespeare Code". Several months later, he received an email from the production team which said "Agatha Christie". The idea for a murder mystery featuring Agatha Christie came originally from producer Phil Collinson.

Roberts, a self-confessed fan of Christie's works, made the episode into a comedy. Roberts based the episode on his favourite Christie works: Crooked House, which focuses on secrets within an aristocratic society, and the 1982 film adaptation of Evil Under the Sun. Speaking of both works, Roberts noted that it was "quite strange writing a modern Doctor Who with posh people in it. We don't really see posh people on television anymore, except at Christmas", and "there's something funny about the veneer of upper class respectability and the truth of any family underneath". He also stated that "there's really nothing nicer than watching a lot of English actors hamming it up in a vaguely exotic location... and then somebody's murdered!" The episode's title was deliberately chosen to sound "vaguely Christie-ish", but Roberts admitted that "[Christie] never used 'the blank and the blank' construction".

In writing the episode, Roberts aimed to make the episode a "big, fun, all-star murder mystery romp". He was influenced by advice given by Davies, who wanted Roberts to "go funnier" with every draft, and former Doctor Who script editor Douglas Adams' advice that "a danger one runs is that the moment you have anything in the script that's clearly meant to be funny in some way, everybody thinks 'oh well we can do silly voices and silly walks and so on', and I think that's exactly the wrong way to do it". Using this advice, he used the adage that in comedy, the characters do not realise the humour, and cited Basil Fawlty's mishaps in Fawlty Towers as an example.

In an interview with Doctor Who Magazine, Roberts stated that "to a certain extent [there was less pressure]" in writing the episode. He was pleased with the success of "The Shakespeare Code" and The Sarah Jane Adventures two-parter Whatever Happened to Sarah Jane?, but likened himself to Corporal Bell, a member of the administrative staff at the fictional Doctor Who organisation UNIT, in saying that he did not wish to be "in the middle of things" or writing episodes "where big, pivotal things have happened to [the Doctor]".

Roberts and Davies held an unofficial contest to see how many references to Christie's works could be inserted. Titles that were noted were: The Murder of Roger Ackroyd; Why Didn't They Ask Evans; The Body in the Library; The Secret Adversary; N or M?; Nemesis; Cat Among the Pigeons; Dead Man's Folly; They Do It With Mirrors; Appointment with Death; Cards on the Table; Sparkling Cyanide; Endless Night; Crooked House; Death in the Clouds; The Moving Finger; Taken at the Flood; Death Comes as the End; Murder on the Orient Express and The Murder at the Vicarage. A deleted scene referred to The Man in the Brown Suit, referring to the Doctor's clothing. The narrative itself parallels several of Christie's novels: the jewel theft storyline parallels The Secret of Chimneys; Miss Chandrakala's death was influenced by And Then There Were None; and the Colonel's revelation that he was not disabled paralleled a key concept of The Pale Horse. In an email conversation with journalist Benjamin Cook, Davies admitted he had initially added a reference to the original title of And Then There Were None, Ten Little Niggers, but decided it was too risky.

=== Cast notes ===
David Tennant's father Alexander McDonald had a silent cameo as a footman in one of the early scenes, after being asked to act when visiting David on set.

The casting of Fenella Woolgar as Agatha Christie was made at the suggestion of David Tennant, who had previously worked with her on Bright Young Things and He Knew He Was Right. She later played Hellan Femor in the audio play The Company of Friends and Morella Wendigo in Nevermore. Fenella Woolgar had previously appeared in an episode of Agatha Christie's Poirot, "Lord Edgware Dies" as Elis, and has since appeared in the episode "Hallowe'en Party" as Elizabeth Whittaker. David Quilter has also made an appearance, "The Million Dollar Bond Robbery".

Christopher Benjamin, who plays Colonel Curbishley, previously starred in two serials of the original Doctor Who series, playing Sir Keith Gold in Inferno (1970) and Henry Gordon Jago in The Talons of Weng-Chiang (1977).

=== Music ===
The music playing at the garden party is the "Twentieth Century Blues", originally from Noël Coward's 1931 play Cavalcade. The recording used here, edited together with other period music, is a 1931 recording of 'Love is the Sweetest Thing' by Ray Noble and the New Mayfair Orchestra, featuring vocalist Al Bowlly.

=== Editing ===
A framing device featuring the aged Agatha Christie (played by Daphne Oxenford) trying to recall the events that took place during her disappearance was deleted because the producers felt it diminished the story's urgency. The original ending featured the Doctor and Donna visiting the elderly Christie; a new ending in the TARDIS set was filmed after the producers decided to cut the framing sequence, much later than the filming for the rest of the story. Although cut, this was Oxenford's last role as an actress before her death in 2012.

The framing sequence and another scene cut for time are present on the Doctor Who Series 4 DVD box set.

== Broadcast and reception ==
BARB figures show that "The Unicorn and the Wasp", was watched by 8.41 million viewers, making it the second most popular programme of the day (behind ITV's Britain's Got Talent) and the seventh most watched programme of the week.

=== Critical reception ===
The episode received an Appreciation Index score of 86 (considered "Excellent").

Ben Rawson-Jones of Digital Spy gave the episode four stars out of five. He claimed that style and substance "merge wonderfully in 'The Unicorn and The Wasp'", praising Gareth Roberts for his "deceptively frivolous story" managing to "successfully juggle many elements including the real life disappearance of Agatha Christie, a giant alien bug and a recreation of the classic 'whodunnit' murder mystery plot." However, he claimed that there was also an "air of predictability about all of the tongue-in-cheek references to Agatha Christie's body of work", citing prior serials that contain famous authors such as The Unquiet Dead and The Shakespeare Code. He then went on to say that these references managed to "excite rather than annoy", due to Roberts having "turned the entire plot into a Christie homage".

Jordan Thomas, the lead director of the game BioShock 2, stated that his creation of the game's character of Sofia Lamb was inspired by Fenella Woolgar's portrayal of Agatha Christie in this episode, and Woolgar was hired to voice the character. The game also has a character named Grace Holloway in it, a reference to the companion of the same name in the 1996 Doctor Who TV film.
