= Doctor Who series 4 =

2008 season of British sci-fi TV series

Doctor Who
- Series 4
- DVD box set cover art
- Showrunner: Russell T Davies
- Starring: David Tennant; Catherine Tate; Freema Agyeman; Billie Piper; John Barrowman; Elisabeth Sladen
- No. of stories: 10
- No. of episodes: 13 (+1 special)

Release
- Original network: BBC One
- Original release: 5 April – 5 July 2008

Season chronology
- ← Previous; Series 3 Next → 2008–2010 specials

The fourth series of the revived British science fiction television programme Doctor Who, and the thirtieth season of the show overall, was preceded by the 2007 Christmas special "Voyage of the Damned". Following the special, a regular series of thirteen episodes aired, starting with "Partners in Crime" on 5 April 2008 and ending with "Journey's End" three months later on 5 July 2008. The series incorporates a loose story arc consisting of recurring mentions of the disappearance of various planets and moons.

"Partners in Crime" marked the debut of Donna Noble, as played by Catherine Tate, as a full-time companion to the Tenth Doctor, after she first appeared in the 2006 Christmas special, "The Runaway Bride". Freema Agyeman also returns as the Doctor's companion Martha Jones from the previous series. John Barrowman, Elisabeth Sladen, Noel Clarke, and Camille Coduri also returned to appear in the series finale, as well as Billie Piper, who appeared as Rose Tyler in six episodes of the series.

The series started production on 8 August 2007 and concluded on 29 March 2008. A short Children in Need special titled "Time Crash" was also produced and set before "Voyage of the Damned", as well as a mini-episode entitled "Music of the Spheres", which premiered at the Doctor Who Prom after the fourth series finale in July 2008. The series was the last to star David Tennant as the Doctor, but he remained as the Tenth Doctor in a series of hour-long specials in 2009, and appeared as the Fourteenth Doctor in the 2023 specials. It was also the last regular series to feature Russell T Davies as the lead writer and showrunner until the fourteenth series.

The series received widespread acclaim from critics and audiences alike and is considered amongst critics as one of the greatest of the revived era, as the series saw the revived era at its peak in popularity. Widely praised for its storytelling, character development, production values, and Tennant–Tate chemistry, the series also received numerous awards. The series finale "The Stolen Earth" / "Journey's End" received an Appreciation Index score of 91, the highest ever for an episode of the programme and one of the highest ever given to a television programme in general. The fourth series generally tops polls as a fan favourite.

== Episodes ==
No. story	No. in series	Title	Directed by	Written by	Original release date	Prod. code	UK viewers (millions)	AI
Special
188	–	"Voyage of the Damned"	James Strong	Russell T Davies	25 December 2007	4X	13.31	86
The Tenth Doctor repairs the damage to the TARDIS from crashing into the Titanic, before landing on the ship. He discovers it is not the RMS Titanic, but instead a duplicate starliner. The Doctor meets waitress Astrid Peth, before joining an excursion to London. The Doctor notes that London is abandoned. As part of cruise line owner Max Capricorn's revenge plot after Max's board votes him out of his company, Captain Hardaker drops the vessel's shielding, causing meteors to be pulled toward the ship. The vessel begins plunging toward the Earth. Max has the Heavenly Host androids kill any survivors. The Host take the Doctor to Max Capricorn. Following the Doctor, Astrid uses a forklift to push Max into the ship's engine, seemingly killing herself too. Reaching the bridge, the Doctor uses the heat from the re-entry to restart and stabilise the ship. The Doctor retrieves Astrid's pattern from her teleport bracelet, before her ghostly remains dissipate into space.
Series
189	1	"Partners in Crime"	James Strong	Russell T Davies	5 April 2008	4.1	9.14	88
Donna Noble finds herself regretting declining the Doctor's invitation to travel in the TARDIS two years ago, and investigates conspiracy theories in the hope that she will find him again. The Doctor and Donna, neither aware of the other's involvement, both investigate Adipose Industries, which is marketing a special diet pill. The pills use body fat to parthenogenetically create small white aliens called Adipose. The Doctor and Donna separately infiltrate Adipose Industries. As they explore the building, they encounter each other through opposite windows in an office. They are confronted by Miss Foster, an alien who is using Britain's population to create Adipose babies. The Doctor creates a diversion and escapes, so Miss Foster accelerates her plans. Throughout London, the Adipose begin to spawn and soon number several thousand. The Doctor and Donna prevent the plan from killing those who had taken the pill, and the remainder of the young Adipose make their way to Adipose Industries. The Adiposian First Family arrive in a spaceship and collect their young, but kill Miss Foster to cover their tracks. The Doctor refrains from killing the young Adipose because they are children. Donna accepts the Doctor's offer to travel in the TARDIS.
190	2	"The Fires of Pompeii"	Colin Teague	James Moran	12 April 2008	4.3	9.04	87
The Doctor and Donna arrive in Pompeii one day before the eruption of Mount Vesuvius in 79. They discover that the TARDIS was sold to sculptor Lobus Caecilius, and they search for it. At Caecilius's house, the Doctor and Donna meet the local augur, Lucius Petrus Dextrus, who has arrived to collect what resembles an oversized circuit board Caecilius has sculpted. The Doctor breaks into Lucius' house with Caecilius's son Quintus, and finds numerous circuit boards made by multiple sculptors without the others knowing. The Doctor deduces that the circuits will form an energy converter. The Doctor discovers that the Sibylline Sisterhood soothsayers are being slowly turned into stone creatures called Pyroviles. He escapes with Donna into the heart of Mount Vesuvius, and is faced with the choice of either erupting the volcano and killing Pompeii's inhabitants, or letting the Pyroviles use the converter to turn all of humanity into Pyroviles. The Doctor and Donna trigger the eruption and run for the TARDIS, leaving Caecilius and his family, but Donna begs the Doctor to go back and save them. The Doctor relents and saves Caecilius and his family, leaving them on a hill overlooking Pompeii.
191	3	"Planet of the Ood"	Graeme Harper	Keith Temple	19 April 2008	4.2	7.50	87
The Doctor and Donna land on the Ood's home planet, the Ood-Sphere where a company called Ood Operations has been selling the Ood as slaves. A member of Friends of the Ood, Dr Ryder, infiltrates the company and lowers the settings on the barrier which blocks the giant brain that telepathically connects all of the Ood. The Ood start a revolution. Halpen murders Dr Ryder, but transforms into an Ood because his personal Ood, Ood Sigma, had been using Halpen's hair loss medication to slowly convert Halpen into an Ood. Sigma promises to take care of Halpen. The Doctor shuts down the barrier, freeing the Ood.
192a	4	"The Sontaran Stratagem"	Douglas Mackinnon	Helen Raynor	26 April 2008	4.4	7.06	87
Martha Jones calls the Doctor for assistance during an investigation by UNIT. Minutes after the TARDIS materialises, Martha authorises the raid of an ATMOS factory. ATMOS is marketing a satellite navigation system developed by young prodigy Luke Rattigan. The system also reduces carbon dioxide emissions to zero; UNIT requested the Doctor's help because the technology may be alien, and they are also concerned about 52 early simultaneous deaths that occurred spontaneously. The Doctor investigates the system at Rattigan's private school and discovers a plot by an alien warrior race known as the Sontarans. Instead of an outright invasion, they are taking control with a combination of human clones, mind control, and ATMOS; Martha is captured and cloned to provide a mole within UNIT. Donna returns home to her mother Sylvia and grandfather Wilfred. The Doctor investigates the ATMOS devices and discovers it can emit a poisonous gas. Wilfred attempts to take the car off the road, but is trapped when all 400 million ATMOS devices installed in cars worldwide are activated. The Doctor stares helplessly at a street full of cars emitting the gas, while the Sontarans prepare themselves for battle.
192b	5	"The Poison Sky"	Douglas Mackinnon	Helen Raynor	3 May 2008	4.5	6.53	88
Sylvia frees Wilfred. The Doctor and Donna return to the ATMOS factory, where the Doctor warns UNIT not to engage the Sontarans. The Doctor tells Donna to stay in the TARDIS, but the Sontarans teleport the TARDIS aboard their ship. The Sontarans defeat UNIT at the factory and take over. UNIT eventually manages a counterattack. Finding the TARDIS missing, the Doctor tells Donna to re-engage the teleport pods. The Doctor enters the factory and awakens the real Martha. The Doctor learns from Martha's clone that the gas is being used to convert Earth into a breeding world for the Sontarans. The Doctor tells Donna how to use the pods and teleport the TARDIS to Earth. The Doctor constructs an atmospheric converter at Rattigan's academy, which harmlessly ignites the gas and allows the humans to breathe. He calibrates the converter so it can ignite the Sontarans on board their ship, and teleports on board. The Doctor offers Staal the chance to retreat, but Staal encourages him to destroy them. At the last second Rattigan switches places with the Doctor, sacrificing himself to destroy the Sontarans. With the Earth saved The Doctor, Donna, and Martha reconvene in the TARDIS to say their goodbyes when suddenly the TARDIS takes flight on its own with Martha trapped onboard.
193	6	"The Doctor's Daughter"	Alice Troughton	Stephen Greenhorn	10 May 2008	4.6	7.33	88
The TARDIS takes the Doctor, Martha, and Donna to the planet Messaline. They are met by soldiers working for General Cobb. The soldiers force the Doctor into a progenation machine, which uses his DNA to generate a soldier who becomes the Doctor's daughter. The other occupants of the planet, the Hath, attack, taking Martha hostage. The Doctor and Donna are taken to see Cobb, and Donna names the Doctor's daughter "Jenny". Elsewhere, Martha tends to an injured Hath, and they take her back to their command center. The General explains that they were meant to live with the Hath, but a dispute arose over "the Source". The Doctor inadvertently reveals its location to the humans and the Hath, and the two sides prepare for battle. The Source turns out to be a terraforming device. The Doctor, Martha, Donna, and Jenny make their way to the Source before both armies arrive. The Doctor declares the war to be over and releases the terraforming agent. Cobb tries to shoot the Doctor, but Jenny takes the bullet to the chest and dies. Later, Jenny revives and commandeers a rocket to leave the planet, while the Doctor and Donna return Martha to Earth.
194	7	"The Unicorn and the Wasp"	Graeme Harper	Gareth Roberts	17 May 2008	4.7	8.41	86
The Doctor and Donna invite themselves to a dinner party in 1926, hosted by Lady Eddison, where one of the guests is Agatha Christie. The Doctor realises that they have arrived on the day Agatha inexplicably disappears. A giant shapeshifting alien wasp in human form called a Vespiform kills three of the guests with methods similar to the murders in Agatha's murder mysteries. The Vespiform is revealed to be Lady Eddison's illegitimate half-human son, Reverend Golightly. Golightly, who has a telepathic link with Lady Eddison through her necklace, became aware of his alien nature and absorbed the details of The Murder of Roger Ackroyd, an Agatha Christie murder mystery his mother was reading at the time. He transforms into the Vespiform and threatens the guests. Agatha lures him towards the Silent Pool. Donna throws the necklace into the water, and the wasp dives after it and drowns. Due to her own connection with the necklace, Agatha falls unconscious and suffers from amnesia. This becomes the event that gave her amnesia during her disappearance, and the Doctor drops her off in Harrogate.
195a	8	"Silence in the Library"	Euros Lyn	Steven Moffat	31 May 2008	4.9	6.27	89
The Doctor and Donna are summoned to a planet-sized library in the 51st century. A scan for life shows the Doctor and Donna as the only humanoid life signs but trillions of nonhuman life forms they cannot see or hear are present. A team of explorers led by River Song (who summoned the Doctor) arrives, and River acts like she knows the Doctor. She discovers the Doctor has not met her yet. The Library's operation system appears to be connected to the mind of the girl living in 21st-century Earth. The girl’s psychiatrist Dr. Moon visits the girl, telling her that the library is actually real, and he implores her to save the people in the library. The Vashta Nerada kill two of the team; the Doctor and Donna learn that the team are wearing communication devices which can store their thought patterns after death. The Doctor explains that the Vashta Nerada are creatures that appear as shadows. The creatures use Dave's suit to chase the others. The Doctor teleports Donna back to the TARDIS, but the teleport fails. The Doctor later finds an information node with Donna's face which tells him Donna has been saved.
195b	9	"Forest of the Dead"	Euros Lyn	Steven Moffat	7 June 2008	4.10	7.84	89
Strackman Lux explains that the Library was constructed by his grandfather, who had a giant computer constructed at Library's core to preserve Lux’s aunt Charlotte's mind. Charlotte "saved" the thousands of missing patrons' minds to the data core to escape the Vashta Nerada. Donna has also been uploaded to the simulation in the core. One of the dead team, Evangelista, reminds Donna her world is not real. After the Vashta Nerada kill more of the expedition, the Doctor discovers the Vashta Nerada’s forests were used to create the books of the Library. The Doctor tries sacrificing himself by giving the computer memory space from his mind to allow the patrons to be teleported back; River knocks the Doctor out and takes his place. The Doctor tries to stop her, but River insists that his death now would prevent her meeting him in her own past. As River initiates the connection, the patrons stored inside the computer re-materialise in the Library. The Doctor finds a data recorder inside the sonic screwdriver his future self gave River, which has preserved her consciousness, and he uploads her pattern, upon which River wakes up in the simulation with her dead crew mates.
196	10	"Midnight"	Alice Troughton	Russell T Davies	14 June 2008	4.8	8.05	86
The Doctor and Donna visit the resort planet Midnight, the surface of which is bathed in lethal radiation. The Doctor plans to take a shuttle tour to visit a waterfall made of sapphires, and decides to take the trip with other tour-goers. Mid-route, the shuttle stops; the Doctor joins Driver Joe and Mechanic Claude in the cockpit and they see all systems appear operational, but they are simply not moving. Joe calls in for a rescue shuttle. The Doctor returns to the cabin, before knocking begins on the sides of the shuttle. When the shuttle is rocked violently, the hostess finds the cockpit has been ripped out. Sky begins repeating what the Doctor and passengers are saying. Sky starts to only repeat what the Doctor says, and soon is speaking simultaneously with him, and eventually starts saying things before the Doctor repeats them. While most of the other passengers begin to sacrifice the Doctor, believing him to now be possessed, the hostess begins to believe in the Doctor. The hostess grabs Sky and sacrifices herself by pulling the two of them into the radiation. The Doctor returns to normal, and the shuttle passengers are rescued and returned to the resort.
197	11	"Turn Left"	Graeme Harper	Russell T Davies	21 June 2008	4.11	8.09	88
A fortune teller approaches Donna, who helps her recall what led to her meeting the Doctor. Donna remembers she was driving to get a new job, and turned left instead of right to get a temp position. When the fortune teller convinces Donna to turn right instead, a large beetle working for the Trickster attaches itself to her back. Donna's decision creates an alternate reality, where she never met the Doctor, so the Doctor drowned after killing the Racnoss children. Sarah Jane and Martha die. The spaceliner Titanic crashes into Buckingham Palace, destroying London, and Britain is placed under martial law. Rose Tyler appears to Donna to save her and her family from the destruction of London, but they are forcibly displaced. Explaining that the stars are going out in every universe, Rose insists that Donna travel back and turn left. Donna is transported back, and is hit by a passing truck, creating a traffic jam that causes her past self to turn left. As Donna dies, Rose whispers a message to her. The alternate universe disappears, and Donna wakes up. Donna recalls Rose's message was the words: "Bad Wolf". The Doctor announces that the universe is in danger.
198a	12	"The Stolen Earth"	Graeme Harper	Russell T Davies	28 June 2008	4.12	8.78	91
The Doctor contacts the Shadow Proclamation to find Earth after it is teleported away. They determine twenty-seven missing planets automatically reorganise into a specific pattern when placed near each other. The Doctor traces the planets to the Medusa Cascade, an inter-universal rift. A Dalek force, led by their creator Davros, quickly subjugate Earth. Davros, alive after the Time War, was saved by Dalek Caan, who become precognitive at the cost of his sanity. The Doctor's former companions Captain Jack Harkness, Martha Jones, Sarah Jane Smith, and Rose Tyler hide in various places. They are all contacted by former prime minister Harriet Jones through a secret "Subwave Network". They attempt to reach the Doctor by amplifying the subwave signal. The Doctor receives the transmission and traces the signal: the Doctor, and consequently the Daleks, are able to locate Earth in a pocket universe, and Harriet is killed. The Doctor lands on the same street as Rose, but is shot by a Dalek. Carried into the TARDIS, the Doctor begins to regenerate.
198b	13	"Journey's End"	Graeme Harper	Russell T Davies	5 July 2008	4.13	10.57	91
The Doctor is regenerating, and part-way through the process, he halts the transformation by transferring the remaining energy into his severed hand. The TARDIS is transported to the Daleks' flagship the Crucible. The Supreme Dalek orders the TARDIS to be destroyed, with Donna locked inside. Donna touches the severed hand filled with regeneration energy, causing a new, cloned Doctor to form, which saves the TARDIS from destruction. Davros explains that the stolen planets form a "Reality Bomb" which has the potential to destroy all matter in every universe. The clone Doctor and Donna arrive and try to refocus the bomb, but fail. Donna becomes imbued with Time Lord knowledge from the clone Doctor, and she disables the bomb. She and the two Doctors relocate the missing planets apart from Earth. The new Doctor destroys the Daleks and the Crucible; Davros refuses to be saved. The companions "tow" the Earth back into its original orbit with the TARDIS. The Doctor returns Rose to her universe, and sends the cloned Doctor with her. Donna's mind becomes overwhelmed by the Time Lord knowledge; the Doctor wipes her mind against her wishes and returns her home.

=== Supplemental episode ===
No.	Title	Directed by	Written by	Original release date	Prod. code	UK viewers (millions)
1	"Time Crash"	Graeme Harper	Steven Moffat	16 November 2007	CIN2	11.0
After the Doctor parts ways with Martha, he tries taking off, only for the TARDIS to spin wildly and sound an alarm. Checking out the systems, the Doctor passes his fifth incarnation doing the same thing. The Tenth Doctor recognises his past self and is overjoyed to see him, gently poking fun at his particular eccentricities; he also explains that his presence has "shorted out the time differential" between himself and his past incarnation, resulting in the latter gaining an uncharacteristic older physical appearance. The Fifth Doctor is annoyed, believing his counterpart to be a fan who has broken into the TARDIS. The Fifth Doctor discovers that two TARDISes have merged, a paradox that will cause a massive black hole. The Tenth Doctor counters it with a supernova, a solution he remembers seeing himself perform in this same incident; the Fifth Doctor realises that the Tenth really is his future self. The Tenth reminisces as the Fifth begins to fade into a separate timeline. The two Doctors say goodbye. As the time streams split, the Fifth Doctor warns the Tenth to put his shields up, but the Titanic collides with the TARDIS.

== Casting ==
=== Main characters ===
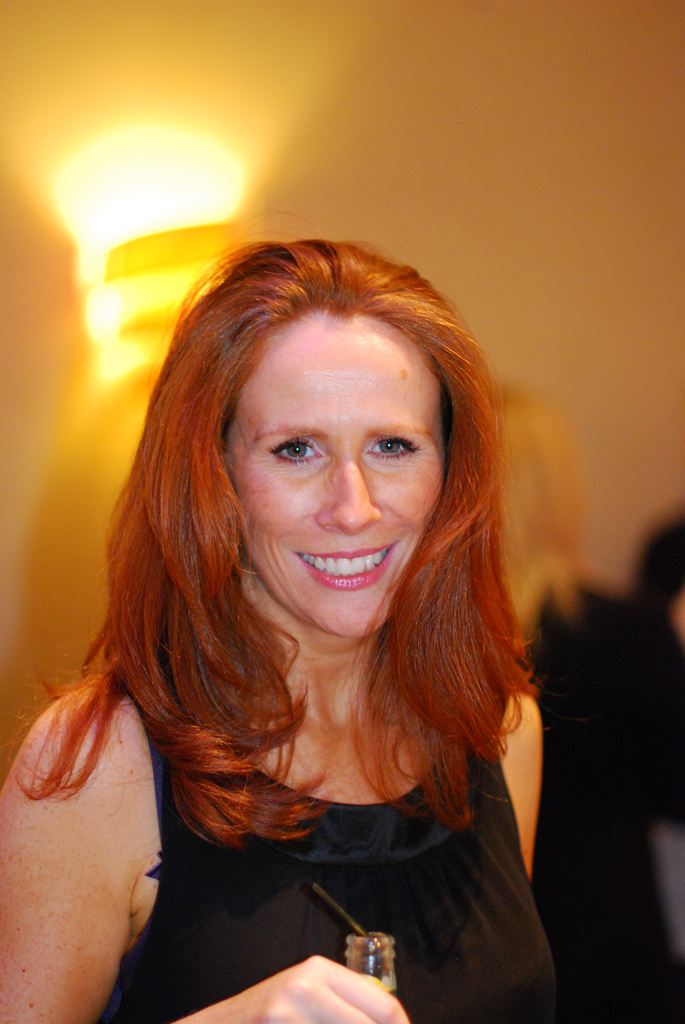
After appearing in "The Runaway Bride" as a one off companion, Donna Noble became the Doctor's companion for series 4.

The fourth series marked David Tennant's third and final full series as the Doctor, although he continued in the role for the 2008–2010 specials. In the Christmas special, Australian actress and singer-songwriter Kylie Minogue starred as one-time companion Astrid Peth, who died during the events of the episode. The companions in the regular series had all been in the lead companion role previously: the primary role of Donna Noble, who was introduced in "The Runaway Bride", was played by Catherine Tate for all thirteen episodes. Her return was announced by the BBC on 3 July 2007. Freema Agyeman, who portrayed the Doctor's companion Martha Jones in series three, returned for "The Sontaran Stratagem", "The Poison Sky", "The Doctor's Daughter", "The Stolen Earth" and "Journey's End". Billie Piper, who played Rose Tyler from the first episode of the first series to the finale of the second series appeared in the three final episodes of the series. She made brief appearances in the episodes "Partners in Crime", "The Poison Sky" and "Midnight". Her return had been planned by Davies since her departure in 2006, and was officially announced on 27 November 2007. John Barrowman, Elisabeth Sladen, Noel Clarke, and Camille Coduri, who portrayed previous companions Jack Harkness, Sarah Jane Smith, Mickey Smith, and Jackie Tyler, respectively, also reappeared in the finale.

=== Guest stars ===
Recurring guest stars for the series included Bernard Cribbins and Jacqueline King as Donna's grandfather Wilfred Mott and mother Sylvia Noble. Penelope Wilton returned as former prime minister Harriet Jones in "The Stolen Earth", her first appearance since "The Christmas Invasion". Noel Clarke and Camille Coduri reprised their roles as Mickey Smith and Jackie Tyler in "Journey's End". Adjoa Andoh returned as Martha Jones' mother Francine in the finale. Eve Myles, Gareth David-Lloyd, and Tommy Knight also starred in the finale in their respective roles of Gwen Cooper, Ianto Jones, and Luke Smith from spin-off series Torchwood and The Sarah Jane Adventures. This marked their first appearances in Doctor Who itself, although Eve Myles had previously featured in "The Unquiet Dead" as a direct ancestor of Gwen called Gwyneth.

The fourth series featured a large number of high-profile stars such as Kylie Minogue (Astrid Peth in "Voyage of the Damned"), Alex Kingston and Steve Pemberton (River Song and Strackman Lux respectively in "Silence in the Library" / "Forest of the Dead"), Sarah Lancashire (Miss Foster in "Partners in Crime"), and Phil Davis and Peter Capaldi (Lucius and Caecillus respectively in "The Fires of Pompeii"). Other guest stars included Sasha Behar, Tracey Childs, Karen Gillan, Phil Cornwell, Tim McInnerny,Adrian Rawlins, Ayesha Dharker, Christopher Ryan, Georgia Moffett (daughter of Fifth Doctor actor Peter Davison and later wife of David Tennant), Nigel Terry, Felicity Kendal, Fenella Woolgar, Felicity Jones, Tom Goodman-Hill, Christopher Benjamin (who had previously portrayed Henry Gordon Jago in "The Talons of Weng-Chiang"), Colin Salmon, Harry Peacock, Talulah Riley, O-T Fagbenle, Lesley Sharp, Colin Morgan, Lindsey Coulson, David Troughton (son of Second Doctor actor Patrick Troughton), Noma Dumezweni, and Chipo Chung (who had previously portrayed Chantho in "Utopia"). Evolutionary biologist Richard Dawkins and Paul O'Grady made cameo appearances as themselves in "The Stolen Earth".

== Production ==
=== Development ===
The Doctor Who title card for series 4, identical to that used in series 3.

All of the episode titles were revealed in the 5 April 2008 issue of Radio Times, except the title of the twelfth, which was "being kept secret as it gives away too much". The article also identified the title of episode 9 as "River's Run", as did the press release for the subsequent issue of Doctor Who Magazine, but this was changed a few days afterwards to "Forest of the Dead". The title of episode 12 was eventually revealed in a press release as "The Stolen Earth". A Children in Need special, entitled "Time Crash", was produced alongside the series and was broadcast on 16 November 2007. In addition, a mini-episode entitled "Music of the Spheres" was shot on 3 May 2008 for series 4 and premiered at the Doctor Who Prom on 27 July 2008, with the audio being broadcast simultaneously on BBC Radio 3. It was then broadcast on BBC One on New Year's Day 2009.

"You've got to watch and listen closely. It's been seeded for a long time, with small but vital references going all the way back to Series One."

— Russell T Davies

Like the previous three series, all of the episodes are bound together in a loose story arc. In previous series, the story arcs were in the form of an arc word, such as Bad Wolf, Torchwood, or Mr Saxon, but the arc for the fourth series is cumulative: Doctor Who Magazine's preview of "Partners in Crime" described the arc as "an element from every episode—whether it's a person, a phrase, a question, a planet, or a mystery—builds up to the grand finale". Multiple mentions were made about the bees disappearing from Earth and stories driven by a missing or lost planet. Executive producer Russell T Davies stated in the same feature that the series' finale had been planned for three years previous to its air date. The regular series focuses heavily on Donna: David Tennant stated that the "whole thirteen weeks is Donna's story [...] why she's with the Doctor again is the subtext", and producer Phil Collinson cited Donna as a "fresh dynamic" for the fourth series.

=== Writing ===
Doctor Who Magazine gradually revealed writers for the series alongside episode announcements. First-time writers for the programme included James Moran, co-writer of the 2006 horror film Severance, and Keith Temple, who had written episodes of Byker Grove and Casualty. Previous writers Gareth Roberts, Stephen Greenhorn, Helen Raynor and Steven Moffat all contributed to the series, with Russell T Davies continuing to act as head writer and executive producer. Tom MacRae had written an episode for this series, entitled "Century House", but this was replaced after Russell T Davies decided that it was too close in tone to Gareth Roberts' "The Unicorn and the Wasp". Amanda Coe was also due to write an episode, but it fell through due to undisclosed reasons. This was Phil Collinson's last series as producer, as well as Russell T Davies and Julie Gardner's last full series as executive producers, all having worked on the programme since its return. Susie Liggat produced five episodes (blocks 2, 5, and 7), as she did in Series 3 with "Human Nature" / "The Family of Blood".

=== Music ===
Murray Gold returned to compose the soundtrack to Series 4, with the score orchestrated and conducted by Ben Foster.

=== Filming ===
Doctor Who had been recommissioned for a fourth series in March 2007, shortly before the broadcast of the third series. The production schedule called for 15 full episodes to be produced, rather than the usual 14, due to the announcement that the next full series of Doctor Who would not air until 2010. This schedule meant that the programme would be unable to enter production during the second half of 2008. The 15 episodes consisted of 13 regular episodes and the 2007 and 2008 Christmas specials. Recording for the 2007 Christmas special began on 9 July 2007, with production on the series itself beginning on 8 August 2007 and concluding on 29 March 2008. The tenth production block—consisting of 2008 Christmas special "The Next Doctor" and the BBC Proms "cutaway" scene "Music of the Spheres"—completed recording on 3 May.

Production blocks were arranged as follows:

Block	Episode(s)	Director	Writer(s)	Producer	Code
1	Christmas special: "Voyage of the Damned"	James Strong	Russell T Davies	Phil Collinson	4X
2	Episode 7: "The Unicorn and the Wasp"	Graeme Harper	Gareth Roberts	Susie Liggat	4.7
2	Episode 3: "Planet of the Ood"	Graeme Harper	Keith Temple	Susie Liggat	4.2
3	Episode 2: "The Fires of Pompeii"	Colin Teague	James Moran	Phil Collinson	4.3
4	Episode 1: "Partners in Crime"	James Strong	Russell T Davies	Phil Collinson	4.1
4	Minisode: "Time Crash"	Graeme Harper	Steven Moffat	Phil Collinson	CIN2
5	Episode 4: "The Sontaran Stratagem"	Douglas Mackinnon	Helen Raynor	Susie Liggat	4.4
5	Episode 5: "The Poison Sky"	Douglas Mackinnon	Helen Raynor	Susie Liggat	4.5
6	Episode 6: "The Doctor's Daughter"	Alice Troughton	Stephen Greenhorn	Phil Collinson	4.6
6	Episode 10: "Midnight"	Alice Troughton	Russell T Davies	Phil Collinson	4.8
7	Episode 11: "Turn Left"	Graeme Harper	Russell T Davies	Susie Liggat	4.11
8	Episode 8: "Silence in the Library"	Euros Lyn	Steven Moffat	Phil Collinson	4.9
8	Episode 9: "Forest of the Dead"	Euros Lyn	Steven Moffat	Phil Collinson	4.10
9	Episode 12: "The Stolen Earth"	Graeme Harper	Russell T Davies	Phil Collinson	4.12
9	Episode 13: "Journey's End"	Graeme Harper	Russell T Davies	Phil Collinson	4.13

== Release ==
=== Promotion ===
On 1 February 2008, the BBC announced that, in a partnership with Carlton Screen Advertising, a 90-second film trailer of the fourth series would be shown in cinemas across Britain "before the most anticipated new releases". The trailer was aired on British television on 22 March 2008. As with the third series and every series subsequently, the stars of the programme and production crew attended a premiere in central London where the first two episodes of the series were screened.

=== Documentary series ===
Doctor Who: The Commentaries is a radio documentary series about Doctor Who. It aired on BBC 7 at 6.30 pm on Sundays with a repeat at 12.30 am on Monday mornings. It could be listened to after transmission via the BBC 7 website and via the BBC iPlayer. Doctor Who: The Commentaries aired as part of BBC 7's 7th Dimension strand. Extended versions of each episode were available as podcasts, although music is removed from these. The series consists of audio commentaries on recently released episodes, and covered all episodes of series 4.

=== Broadcast ===
The fourth series premiered on 5 April 2008 with "Partners in Crime", and concluded after 13 episodes on 5 July 2008 with "Journey's End". Doctor Who Confidential also aired alongside each episode of the series, continuing on from the previous series.

=== Home media ===
==== DVD and Blu-ray releases ====
All releases are for DVD unless otherwise indicated:

- ^{(D)} indicates a DVD release for a specific date
- ^{(B)} indicates a Blu-ray release

Series	Story no.	Episode name	Duration	Release date		
Series	Story no.	Episode name	Duration	R2	R4	R1
4	188	Doctor Who : Voyage of the Damned "Time Crash" & "Voyage of the Damned"	1 × 8 min. 1 × 72 min.	10 March 2008	1 July 2008	—N/a
4	189–191	Doctor Who : Series 4, Volume 1 "Partners in Crime" – "Planet of the Ood"	2 × 50 min. 1 × 45 min.	2 June 2008	7 August 2008	—N/a
4	192–194	Doctor Who : Series 4, Volume 2 "The Sontaran Stratagem" – "The Unicorn and the Wasp"	4 × 45 min.	7 July 2008	4 September 2008	—N/a
4	195–196	Doctor Who : Series 4, Volume 3 "Silence in the Library" – "Midnight"	3 × 45 min.	4 August 2008	2 October 2008	—N/a
4	197–198	Doctor Who : Series 4, Volume 4 "Turn Left" – "Journey's End"	1 × 50 min. 1 × 45 min. 1 × 65 min.	1 September 2008	6 November 2008	—N/a
4	188–198	Doctor Who : The Complete Fourth Series (includes "Voyage of the Damned" and "Time Crash")	1 × 8 min. 1 × 72 min. 9 × 45 min. 3 × 50 min. 1 × 65 min.	17 November 2008 ^{(D)} 4 December 2013 ^{(B)} (Note: Part of The Complete Series 1–7); 31 August 2015 ^{(B)}	4 December 2008 ^{(D)} 4 December 2013 ^{(B)}	18 November 2008 ^{(D)} 5 November 2013 ^{(B)}
4	188–193	Doctor Who : Series 4, Part 1 "Voyage of the Damned" – "The Doctor's Daughter"	1 × 72 min. 2 × 50 min. 4 × 45 min.	—N/a	—N/a	5 August 2014
4	194–198	Doctor Who : Series 4, Part 2 "The Unicorn and the Wasp" – "Journey's End"	5 × 45 min. 1 × 50 min. 1 × 65 min.	—N/a	—N/a	2 September 2014
2, 3, 4, 2008–2010 specials	167–202	Doctor Who: The Complete David Tennant Years	5 × 6 min. 2 × 7 min. 1 × 8 min. 1 × 12 min. 35 × 45 min. 4 × 50 min. 6 × 60 min. 1 × 65 min. 1 × 72 min. 1 × 75 min.	10 November 2014	—N/a	11 October 2011^{(D)} 17 September 2019^{(B)}

==== UMD releases ====
Series	Story no.	Episode name	Duration	Release date		
Series	Story no.	Episode name	Duration	UK	Australia	USA / Canada
4	189–191	"Partners in Crime" "The Fires of Pompeii" "Planet of the Ood"	3 × 45 min.	April 2009	—N/a	—N/a

== In print ==
Series	Story no.	Novelisation title	Author	Original publisher	Paperback release date	Audiobook	
Series	Story no.	Novelisation title	Author	Original publisher	Paperback release date	Release date (Note: Unabridged from BBC Audio / AudioGo unless otherwise indicated)	Narrator
4	190	The Fires of Pompeii	James Moran	BBC Books (Target collection)	14 July 2022	14 July 2022	Clare Corbett
4	191	Planet of the Ood	Keith Temple	BBC Books (Target collection)	13 July 2023		Silas Carson

== Reception ==
=== Critical reception ===
The fourth series received positive reviews from critics. The series is considered among critics as one of the greatest of the revived era of the programme, as the series saw the revived era at its peak in popularity. The series finale "The Stolen Earth" / "Journey's End" received an Appreciation Index score of 91, the highest ever for an episode of Doctor Who and one of the highest ever given to a television programme. A poll conducted by Radio Times in 2015 found that readers voted the fourth series finale as the greatest finale of the programme.

Ben Rawson-Jones of Digital Spy gave the series four out of five stars, stating that "a winning mixture of elation and poignancy ensured that the season achieved a great tonal balance where neither light nor dark was allowed to fully overwhelm the other". He praised Tate's performance, by saying of the series that "at the core was Catherine Tate's excellent performance as Donna Noble, a refreshing contrast to the effervescent spirits of Rose and Martha". He also praised the tone of the series, stating that "Russell T. Davies deserves great praise for assembling such a diverse range of stories". However, Rawson-Jones was critical of certain monsters lacking "menace"; he named the Sontarans as an example and stated that the execution of UNIT "was a genuine letdown".

Den of Geek gave an overwhelmingly positive review of the series, giving it four stars out of five, believing it to be the most consistent series of the revived era so far, and of the programme as a whole. They praised the special effects, citing "The Fires of Pompeii", "Planet of the Ood" and the finale as "the epitome of what The Mill can do". Den of Geek further praised the acting talents of David Tennant and Catherine Tate, saying "never have we had it so good [...] [Tate] displayed such a fine grasp of character that even David Tennant was left slightly in the shade by her energetic, thoughtful, hopeful and achingly sorrowful (not to mention damn funny to boot) performance". However, they also criticised the familiarity of the Sontaran two-parter and the hollowness of "Voyage of the Damned". Overall, Den of Geek summarised the series as "astonishing", stating that "series four was never anything less than stunning, there were no 'lows' it was all 'highs'".

David Cornelius of DVD Talk stated that it was "the best season yet [...] every episode in this season is a highlight". He too praised Tate's performance, declaring her as "the new series' best companion yet." Cornelius went on to state that Davies' and Tennant's final series was the series "we'll always remember as the year Davies and Tennant went out on top". He further praised the cast and crew as a whole, complimenting "the excellent guest stars, the impressive set designs, the sharp direction and the detailed creature makeup". Overall, Cornelius summarised that "the fourth season of Doctor Who is outstanding television [...] and a monumental work of storytelling".

=== Awards and nominations ===
Year	Award	Category	Nominee(s)	Result	Ref(s)
2008	Constellation Awards	Best Science Fiction Television Series of 2008	Doctor Who	Won	
2008	Constellation Awards	Best Male Performance in a 2008 Science Fiction Television Episode	David Tennant for "Midnight"	Nominated	
2008	Constellation Awards	Best Female Performance in a 2008 Science Fiction Television Episode	Catherine Tate for "Turn Left"	Won	
2008	Constellation Awards	Best Overall 2008 Science Fiction Film or Television Script	Steven Moffat for "Silence in the Library"	Won	
2008	Edinburgh International Television Festival Award	Best Programme of the Year	Doctor Who	Won	
2008	National Television Awards	Outstanding Drama Performance	David Tennant	Won	
2008	National Television Awards	Outstanding Drama Performance	Catherine Tate	Nominated	
2008	RTS Television Awards	Best Drama Series	Doctor Who	Nominated	
2008	RTS Television Awards	Best Actor-Male	David Tennant	Nominated	
2008	RTS Television Awards	Best Sound-Drama	Julian Howarth, Tim Ricketts, Paul McFadden and Paul Jefferies for "Midnight"	Won	
2008	Satellite Awards	Best Actor – Television Series Drama	David Tennant	Nominated	
2008	Scream Awards	Best Science Fiction Actor	David Tennant	Nominated	
2008	SFX Awards	Best TV Show	Doctor Who	Won	
2008	SFX Awards	Best TV Episode	Graeme Harper and Russell T. Davies for "The Stolen Earth" / "Journey's End"	Won	
2008	SFX Awards	Best TV Actor and Actress	David Tennant and Catherine Tate	Won	
2008	TV Quick Awards	Best Loved Drama	Doctor Who	Won	
2008	TV Quick Awards	Best Actor and Actress	Tennant and Tate	Won	
2008	Visual Effects Society Awards	Outstanding Matte Paintings in a Broadcast Program or Commercial	Simon Wicker, Charlie Bennett, Tim Barter, Arianna Lago for "Silence in the Library"	Won	
2009	BAFTA Cymru Awards	Best Drama Series/Serial	Doctor Who	Nominated	
2009	BAFTA Cymru Awards	Best Director – Drama	Euros Lyn for "Silence in the Library"	Won	
2009	BAFTA Cymru Awards	Best Screenwriter	Russell T. Davies for "Midnight"	Won	
2009	BAFTA Cymru Awards	Best Original Music Soundtrack	Doctor Who	Nominated	
2009	BAFTA Cymru Awards	Best Sound	Julian Howarth, Tim Ricketts, Paul McFadden and Paul Jefferies for Midnight	Won	
2009	BAFTA Cymru Awards	Best Director of Photography – Drama	Rory Taylor for "Silence in the Library"	Nominated	
2009	BAFTA Cymru Awards	Best Make-Up	Barbara Southcott for "The Next Doctor"	Nominated	
2009	BAFTA Cymru Awards	Best Editor	Phillip Kloss for "The Next Doctor"	Nominated	
2009	British Academy Television Awards	Best Drama Series	Doctor Who	Nominated	
2009	British Academy Television Craft Awards	Best Writer	Russell T. Davies for "Midnight"	Nominated	
2009	British Academy Television Craft Awards	Best Editing Fiction/Entertainment	Philip Kloss	Won	
2009	Broadcasting Press Guild Awards	Best Actor	David Tennant	Nominated	
2009	Hugo Awards	Hugo Award for Best Dramatic Presentation	"Silence in the Library" / "Forest of the Dead" and "Turn Left"	Nominated	

== Soundtrack ==
Selected pieces of score from this series (from "Voyage of the Damned" to "Journey's End"), as composed by Murray Gold, were released on 17 November 2008 by Silva Screen Records. 27 tracks were released on a single CD, with a total length of 76 minutes and 27 seconds.

Doctor Who: Series 4

Soundtrack album by Murray Gold, Ben Foster and the BBC National Orchestra of Wales
- Released: 17 November 2008
- Recorded: 2007–2008
- Genre: Soundtrack
- Length: 76:26
- Label: Silva Screen Records
- Producers: Murray Gold, Ben Foster and Jake Jackson

Doctor Who soundtrack chronology
Series 3 (2007)	Series 4 (2008)	Series 4 – The Specials (2010)

No.	Title	Episode	Length
1.	"Doctor Who Series Four Opening Credits"	All	0:45
2.	"A Noble Girl About Town"	"Partners in Crime"	2:12
3.	"Life Among the Distant Stars"	"Partners in Crime"	2:28
4.	"Corridors and Fire Escapes"	Various	1:13
5.	"The Sybilline Sisterhood"	"The Fires of Pompeii"	1:53
6.	"Songs of Captivity and Freedom"	"Planet of the Ood"	4:03
7.	"UNIT Rocks"	"The Sontaran Stratagem" / "The Poison Sky"	1:11
8.	"The Doctor's Daughter"	"The Doctor's Daughter"	1:37
9.	"The Source"	"The Doctor's Daughter"	3:20
10.	"The Unicorn and the Wasp"	"The Unicorn and the Wasp"	3:09
11.	"The Doctor's Theme"	"Forest of the Dead"	2:45
12.	"Voyage of the Damned Suite"	"Voyage of the Damned"	10:21
13.	"The Girl with No Name"	"Silence in the Library" / "Forest of the Dead"	2:45
14.	"The Song of Song"	"Silence in the Library" / "Forest of the Dead"	2:13
15.	"All in the Mind"	"Silence in the Library" / "Forest of the Dead"	1:16
16.	"Silence in the Library"	"Silence in the Library" / "Forest of the Dead"	2:56
17.	"The Greatest Story Never Told"	"Forest of the Dead"	6:16
18.	"Midnight"	"Midnight"	3:07
19.	"Turn Left"	"Turn Left"	2:21
20.	"A Dazzling End"	"Turn Left"	2:14
21.	"The Rueful Fate of Donna Noble"	"Turn Left", "Journey's End"	2:44
22.	"Davros"	"The Stolen Earth" / "Journey's End"	2:03
23.	"The Dark and Endless Dalek Night"	"The Stolen Earth" / "Journey's End"	3:43
24.	"A Pressing Need to Save the World"	"The Stolen Earth"	4:50
25.	"Hanging on the Tablaphone"	"The Stolen Earth" / "Journey's End"	1:04
26.	"Song of Freedom"	"The Stolen Earth" / "Journey's End"	2:51
27.	"Doctor Who Series Four Closing Credits"	All	1:06
Total length:			76:26
