= Upper Boat Studios =

Former television studio complex in Wales

- Location within Rhondda Cynon Taf

General information
- Status: Used as warehousing
- Type: Television studio
- Architectural style: Modern
- Location: Unit 1/2, Tonteg Road, Treforest Industrial Estate, Upper Boat, Pontypridd, CF37 5UA, Wales, United Kingdom
- Coordinates: 51°34′33″N 3°18′00″W
- Current tenants: None
- Opened: 27 July 2006; 20 years ago
- Client: BBC Wales

Technical details
- Grounds: 86,000 sq ft (7,990 m^{2})

Design and construction
- Known for: Filming of Doctor Who

Upper Boat Studios was a television studio complex leased to the BBC in mid-2006, and formerly operated by BBC Wales.

It is located in Upper Boat, a village on the outskirts of Pontypridd, Rhondda Cynon Taf, near Cardiff in Wales. The studios, previously a seat belt manufacturing factory for the automotive industry, were officially opened on 27 July 2006; 20 years ago, by Welsh Enterprise Minister Andrew Davies, for the purpose of producing Doctor Who, along with its related spin-off programmes.

== Facilities ==
At ten times larger than BBC Wales existing site at Llandaff, the Doctor Who residency at Upper Boat Studios included the use of its six sound stages. Other facilities at Upper Boat included a large props store, workshops, and video editing suites.

== History ==
By 2011, Doctor Who was the only programme still based at Upper Boat, following the move of several BBC Wales productions to the new permanent home at the new Roath Lock studios. Doctor Who itself relocated to Roath Lock throughout 2012, with the last filming day at Upper Boat on 11 May 2012.

Despite the studio closure, production on Sherlock series 3 continued at the studios until September 2013.

== Productions ==
=== Productions based at Upper Boat Studios ===
Title	Genre	No. of episodes	Produced from	Notes
Doctor Who	Science fiction drama	66	2006–2012	moved from Unit Q2 in Newport, Wales; moved to Roath Lock in 2012, midway through production of Series 7
Doctor Who Confidential	'Making-of' documentary	60	2006–2011	moved from Unit Q2 in Newport
The Sarah Jane Adventures	Science fiction children's drama	53	2006–2010	entire series produced at Upper Boat Studios
Torchwood	Science fiction drama	31	2006–2008	moved to Los Angeles
Torchwood Declassified	'Making-of' documentary	27	2006–2008	moved to Los Angeles
Totally Doctor Who	Children's magazine programme	12	2007	moved from BBC Wales
Sherlock	Crime drama	9 + pilot	2009–2013	series 1, series 2, and series 3; produced by Hartswood Films West
Sarah Jane's Alien Files	Children's compilation programme	6	2010	entire series produced at Upper Boat Studios

=== Productions partially filmed at Upper Boat Studios ===
Title	Genre	No. of episodes	Produced from	Notes
Upstairs Downstairs	Costume drama	3	2010	kitchen and servant's hall sets; moved to Roath Lock

== See also ==
- Roath Lock
