= Gridlock (Doctor Who) =

2007 episode of the Doctor Who TV series

181 – "Gridlock"
- Doctor Who episode
- The titular gridlock. The Motorway, aside from one car set, was constructed entirely of computer-generated imagery.

Cast
- Doctor: David Tennant – Tenth Doctor
- Companion: Freema Agyeman – Martha Jones
- Others: Ardal O'Hanlon – Thomas Kincade Brannigan; Anna Hope – Novice Hame; Travis Oliver – Milo; Lenora Crichlow – Cheen; Jennifer Hennessy – Valerie; Bridget Turner – Alice; Georgine Anderson – May; Simon Pearsall – Whitey; Daisy Lewis – Javit; Nicholas Boulton – Businessman; Erika Macleod – Sally Calypso; Judy Norman – Ma; Graham Padden – Pa; Lucy Davenport – Pale Woman; Tom Edden – Pharmacist #1; Natasha Williams – Pharmacist #2; Gayle Telfer Stevens – Pharmacist #3; Struan Rodger – The Face of Boe

Production
- Directed by: Richard Clark
- Written by: Russell T Davies
- Produced by: Phil Collinson
- Executive producers: Russell T Davies; Julie Gardner
- Music by: Murray Gold
- Production code: 3.3
- Series: Series 3
- Running time: 45 minutes
- First broadcast: 14 April 2007

Chronology
| ← Preceded by "The Shakespeare Code" | Followed by → "Daleks in Manhattan" |

"Gridlock" is the third episode of the third series of the British science fiction television series Doctor Who, which was first broadcast on BBC One on 14 April 2007. It was written by Russell T Davies and directed by Richard Clark.

The episode is set five billion years in the future on the planet New Earth, one of the many planets humanity had settled on. In the episode, alien time traveller The Doctor (David Tennant) and his new travelling companion Martha Jones (Freema Agyeman) discover the remainder of humanity on the planet live in perpetual gridlock within the Motorway, a highway system beneath the city state of New New York. When Martha is kidnapped, the Doctor races to find her before she enters the dangerous "fast lane".

"Gridlock" completes a loose trilogy that began with "The End of the World" and "New Earth" (2006), and contains hints at the series' story arc. The story is designed to show how the Doctor can bring hope into a world. Production of "Gridlock" took place in September and October 2006. Much of the episode was filmed in-studio and used a large amount of computer-generated imagery, so it appeared to be set in a "CGI world". Some location filming was done in Cardiff, most notably at the Temple of Peace. "Gridlock" was viewed by 8.41 million viewers in the UK and received generally positive reviews from critics.

== Plot ==
The Tenth Doctor takes Martha to an alleyway in the city-state of New New York on New Earth where street vendors are selling addictive mood drugs in the form of sticky patches to help people deal with their emotions. A young couple named Milo and Cheen kidnap Martha. Once in their vehicle, they explain that Cheen is pregnant and that they needed three adult passengers with them to use the fast lane. They promise they will drop Martha off when they reach their destination ten miles away, estimated to take six years. The Doctor chases after Martha's kidnappers and arrives at the Motorway, a completely enclosed highway filled with thousands of hover vans stuck in gridlock. One of the motorists, Brannigan, helps the Doctor locate the vehicle containing Martha, which is heading towards the fast lane. The Doctor tries to call the police but gets put on hold, so the Doctor decides to try to reach Martha himself by breaking into and out of vans on the way to the fast lane.

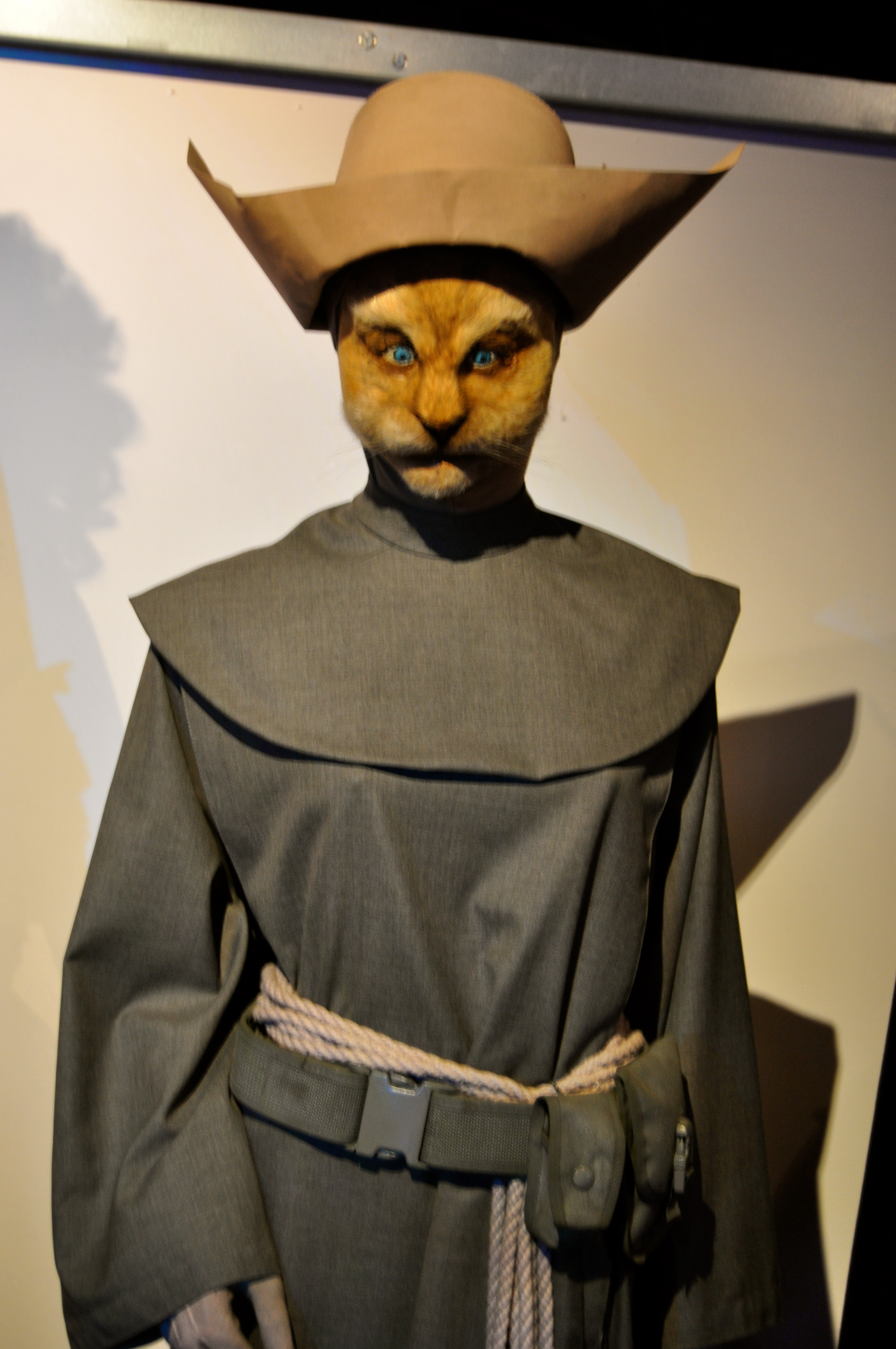
Novice Hame, as she appears at the Doctor Who Experience.

Martha, Milo, and Cheen drive into the fast lane and see crab-like Macra, who attempt to capture and eat those that fly in the fast lane. The Doctor watches as Milo's van is nearly caught by a Macra claw, but Martha realises that the beings are attracted by the light and motion generated by the van and has Milo cut the power to hide in the fog. Novice Hame finds the Doctor and teleports him against his will to the Senate of New New York. Hame explains that a virus mutated in the drug "Bliss" and wiped out the entire surface population. Eventually the virus also perished. Those in the Motorway were spared by being sealed in and the planet was quarantined. The Face of Boe wired himself to the system to keep the Motorway operational but could not unseal it himself. The Doctor works with Hame to unseal the Motorway. The Face of Boe gives the last of his energy to the system, allowing the ceiling of the Motorway to open and freeing the motorists. When Martha arrives at the Senate, the Face of Boe, close to death, imparts his final message to the Doctor: "You are not alone." The Doctor tells Martha that the Face of Boe is wrong; he is the last Time Lord and his planet was destroyed in the Time War.

== Production ==
=== Writing ===
"Gridlock" is the third in a trilogy which began with series one's "The End of the World" and series two's "New Earth". Novice Hame and the green crescent seen on the mood patches previously appeared in "New Earth". Head writer and executive producer Russell T Davies wanted to visit the same world each year to maintain a sense of continuity, something that could be hard to do with Doctor Who's formula. Producer Phil Collinson remarked that "Gridlock" displayed Davies' tendency to write about "topical" issues; it is set in a dark dystopian future, but is also a satire on the common traffic jam. While the story is bleak, Davies showed how the Doctor transforms the place by literally opening up the sky and bringing in light. Davies also used hymns to signify hope and a togetherness of the members of the Motorway. Those on the Motorway sing "The Old Rugged Cross", and the hymn heard at the end of the episode is "Abide with Me". The episode also displays the Doctor's growing attachment to Martha; he feels guilty for lying to her and bringing her to New New York just to show off and realises that he misses her when she is taken.

Davies stated that he based many aspects of New New York on Mega-City One from the anthology comic 2000 AD, including the businessman's appearance on Max Normal from the Judge Dredd comic books. The numbered mood patches parallel the number coded mood controllers in the Ninth Doctor novel Only Human by Gareth Roberts; Davies confirms that this was his inspiration. The character of Sally Calypso was an homage to Halo Jones, which featured a similar character named Swifty Frisko. Also in the online commentary, Davies noted that Brannigan's appearance was based on "Ratz", the CGI disembodied cat's head that was a "virtual presenter" of CBBC's Live & Kicking in the early 1990s. Ma and Pa at the start of the episode are based on the farming couple in the painting American Gothic, both having identical hairstyles, glasses and fashions. Alice and May Cassini are the first homosexual married couple featured in Doctor Who.

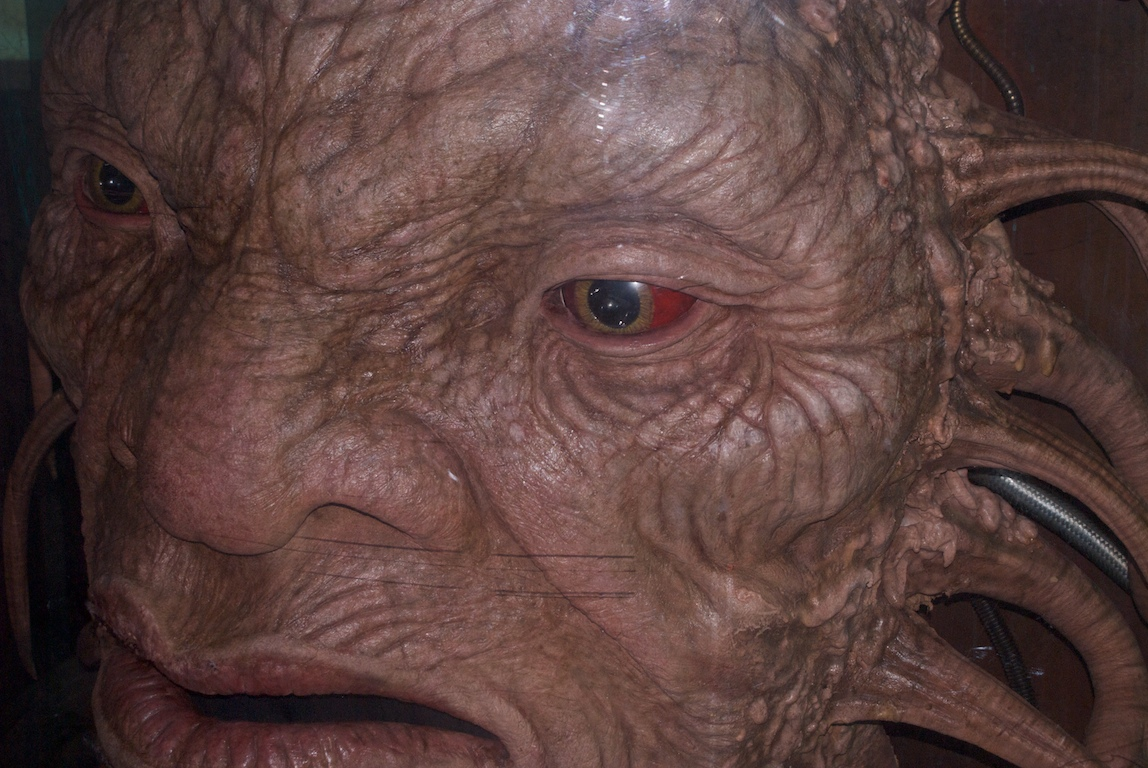
The Face of Boe as shown at the Doctor Who Experience.

The episode marks the second appearance of the large crustacean Macra race, who previously appeared in the Second Doctor serial The Macra Terror (1967). In "Gridlock", they have "devolved" from their previous, more intelligent, state. Davies thought it was "cute" to bring back a forty-year-old monster whose story is now missing. "Gridlock" also contains important hints about the story arc of the series as it reveals the "great secret" promised to the Doctor by the Face of Boe in "New Earth" – "You are not alone". The Face of Boe was originally intended to die in "New Earth", but as that episode featured another death, it was put off. The meaning of Boe's final words are revealed in "Utopia", while "Last of the Time Lords" suggest – but is purposely never confirmed in-universe – that the Face of Boe's true identity is Captain Jack Harkness (John Barrowman).

=== Filming ===
"Gridlock" was in the third filming block for the series, along with "The Lazarus Experiment". Filming took place from mid-September to early October 2006. The episode uses "some of the largest and most complex CGI effects of all the series so far". The Motorway was entirely constructed out of CGI aside from a single car set; it was the first time an episode was set inside a "CGI world". Will Cohen, The Mill's Visual FX Producer, revealed in Radio Times that the films Blade Runner, The Fifth Element and Star Wars, specifically the planet of Coruscant influenced the look of New New York.

Much of the episode was completed in the Upper Boat Studios, particularly the interior car scenes. For this, only one car set was used, with it being redecorated for each different car. The cars were decorated to look like they had been lived in, and incorporated futuristic and well-known home objects. Brannigan and Valerie's children were played by real kittens, which proved difficult to direct. The production team shot for four days in the "6-foot by 6-foot" car, which Davies called a "nightmare" because not many camera angles were available and only one crew member could adjust the props and lighting at a time. In addition, smoke was generated around the car so it would blend in with the CGI smoke from the CGI cars. The small set was intended to benefit the actors, as they would feel claustrophobic. For the scene in which the Doctor jumps from car to car, the underside of a car was built and suspended ten to fifteen feet above the top of the car set with a green screen all around to get as many angles as possible. Davies preferred action sequences that moved up and down, a scale that is not seen much on television. The Temple of Peace in Cardiff was the location for the Darkened Temple, as well as the TV Studio with news reporter Sally Calypso. The production team spent two days filming there, on 18 and 19 September 2006. The undercity where the Doctor and Martha arrive was filmed at the Cardiff Bay maltings and the Ely Papermill, which were designed to look in disrepair. The artificial rain proved difficult in some shots, as the production team had trouble getting one of the side walls wet.

== Broadcast and reception ==
"Gridlock" was broadcast directly after the FA Cup semi-final between Manchester United and Watford on BBC One. Had the match gone into extra time, the episode would have been postponed until the following week. Overnight ratings showed that the episode was watched by 8 million viewers, which increased to 8.41 once time-shifted viewers had been taken into account. This placed it as the second most-watched programme of the week on BBC One, and the seventh overall. "Gridlock" received an Appreciation Index of 85.

IGN's Travis Fickett rated "Gridlock" an 8.4 out of 10, calling it "the first great episode" of the third series. He particularly praised the satire of a traffic jam, Tennant's acting, and the use of Martha as a companion to aid the Doctor's loss. Ian Berriman of SFX gave "Gridlock" four out of five stars. He praised the attention to detail of the props department, the appearance of the Macra, and the concept of the traffic jam, but felt there were many plot holes. He also called Travis Oliver, the actor who played Milo, "wooden". Slant Magazine reviewer Ross Ruediger wrote that he did not like the episode much on first viewing because it was "too busy and too chaotic to get a proper grip on" but "subsequent viewings proved those very qualities are the backbone of the story." He initially wished to see more of the Macra. Mark Wright of The Stage was positive towards calling back to "The End of the World" and "New Earth", and praised Agyeman and the visual look of the episode. Despite finding the ending "life-affirming", he found a possible plot hole: "one wonders why the Face of Boe didn't just open the roof in the first place".

DVD Talk's Nick Lyons compared the episode to "fine wine ... [it] gets better with age". Lyons wrote, "Not only does the episode contain stunning imagery (the Macra, the motorway), but 'Gridlock' also has some of the most touching scenes in "Doctor Who" history". In Who Is the Doctor, an unauthorised guide to the revival of Doctor Who, Graeme Burk interpreted "Gridlock" as an allegory that was not meant to be realistic, and commented that its strength was the "powerful" theme of the motorists being blind to the truth. He stated that the "fun, fast-paced story with lots of comedic set pieces" worked to its advantage, and the appearance of the Macra was a "treat" for long-time fans. Despite the popularity of the later series episodes "Human Nature"/"The Family of Blood" and "Blink", Burk felt that "Gridlock" was the "worthiest candidate for this season's best story". Burk's co-author Robert Smith also called it "one of the best episodes" of the revived series, particularly praising the acting of Tennant and Agyeman. Topless Robot named it the fifth best Tenth Doctor episode.
