= Doctor Who series 3 =

2007 season of British sci-fi TV series

Doctor Who
- Series 3
- DVD box set cover art
- Showrunner: Russell T Davies
- Starring: David Tennant; Freema Agyeman; John Barrowman
- No. of stories: 9
- No. of episodes: 13 (+1 special)

Release
- Original network: BBC One
- Original release: 31 March – 30 June 2007

Series chronology
- ← Previous; Series 2 Next → Series 4

The third series of the revived British science fiction programme Doctor Who, and the twenty-ninth season of the show overall, was preceded by the 2006 Christmas special "The Runaway Bride". Following the special, a regular series of thirteen episodes was broadcast, starting with "Smith and Jones" on 31 March 2007 and ending with "Last of the Time Lords" on 30 June 2007. In addition, a 13-part animated serial (equivalent to one regular episode) was produced and broadcast as part of Totally Doctor Who.

The series stars David Tennant as the tenth incarnation of the Doctor, an alien Time Lord who travels through time and space in his TARDIS, which appears to be a British police box on the outside. In the Christmas special he is joined by Catherine Tate as Donna Noble. The series also introduces Freema Agyeman as the Doctor's new companion Martha Jones, who leaves at the end of the series because her family need support while recovering from the events of the series finale, which involved her mother, sister, and brother being tortured. John Barrowman also reprises his role as Captain Jack Harkness in the final three episodes which serve as the finale. The series is connected by a loose story arc consisting of the recurring phrase "Vote Saxon", which ultimately is revealed to be the return of the Doctor's enemy Time Lord the Master, first played by Derek Jacobi before regenerating into John Simm.

Three episodes from Series 3 were adapted from previously published works: "Human Nature" / "The Family of Blood" was adapted by Paul Cornell from his own New Adventures novel, also entitled Human Nature, while "Blink" originated as a short story in the 2006 Doctor Who annual by Steven Moffat called "What I Did on My Christmas Holidays by Sally Sparrow". "Human Nature" is also the first instance of the Doctor's previous incarnations prior to his ninth being explicitly referenced in the revived era through the sketches in The Journal of Impossible Things.

The series garnered widespread acclaim and received positive reviews from critics, along with various awards. Viewers and critics alike praised its acting, music, storytelling, suspenseful cliffhangers, meaningful themes, and high production quality.

== Episodes ==
No. story	No. in series	Title	Directed by	Written by	Original release date	Prod. code	UK viewers (millions)	AI
Special
178	–	"The Runaway Bride"	Euros Lyn	Russell T Davies	25 December 2006	3X	9.35	84
Lance, a worker at a security firm once owned by Torchwood, slowly and secretly poisons his fiancée, secretary Donna Noble, with Huon particles over the course of six months to use Donna's biology as a catalyst to awaken the children of the omnivorous Empress of the Racnoss, hibernating at the centre of the Earth. The reaction of the particles causes Donna to appear inside the TARDIS. The Tenth Doctor attempts to return Donna to her wedding, but they miss the ceremony. The Empress uses the Huon particles inside Donna and Lance to wake her children up, and feeds Lance to her children by dropping him down a shaft under the River Thames leading directly to her children. The Empress attacks humanity with her Christmas star shaped spaceship. The Doctor requests he finds the Racnoss another world for them to peacefully exist. The Empress declines the request, and the Doctor uses explosive baubles to flood the shaft with water from the Thames. The army kills the Empress with tanks and artillery after all her energy is used up. The Doctor invites Donna to travel with him, but she declines, suggesting that he needs someone to keep his temperament in check.
Series
179	1	"Smith and Jones"	Charles Palmer	Russell T Davies	31 March 2007	3.1	8.71	88
The Doctor goes undercover at the Royal Hope Hospital in London, where he meets medical student Martha Jones. The entire hospital is transported to the Moon by the Judoon, a brutal outer-space police force-for-hire, who are searching for the blood-sucking Florence Finnegan. Mrs Finnegan is a Plasmavore—an internal shape-changer—and has been assimilating the human blood of hospital workers to avoid detection. The Doctor, an alien, allows her to drink his blood and she is detected as non-human, and executed. Martha revives the Doctor using CPR. The Doctor stops Finnegan's attempt to destroy her Judoon pursuers along with half of Earth with a magnetic pulse from an MRI machine in the hospital when he shuts the machine down. The Doctor invites Martha to join him for a trip in the TARDIS in return for saving his life.
180	2	"The Shakespeare Code"	Charles Palmer	Gareth Roberts	7 April 2007	3.2	7.23	87
The Doctor and Martha land around Southwark in 1599, where they discover that William Shakespeare is under the spell of witch-like aliens known as Carrionites who are forcing him to finish Love's Labour's Won using a poppet. The Doctor learns that they are using the powerful words of the play to bring back their imprisoned species; the words spoken by the actors are instructions which open a portal. The Doctor tries and fails to get Shakespeare to stop the play's performance at the Globe Theatre. When the Carrionites start coming through the portal, the Doctor convinces Shakespeare to use his own powerful gift of words to close the portal. The closing of the portal brings all of the copies of Shakespeare's lost play with the Carrionites.
181	3	"Gridlock"	Richard Clark	Russell T Davies	14 April 2007	3.3	8.41	85
The Doctor takes Martha to the undercity of New New York on the planet New Earth in the year 5,000,000,053. 24 years earlier, a virus mutated which killed nearly everyone on the planet. The undercity was sealed off to save it from the virus, its system being maintained by the Face of Boe and his nurse Novice Hame, but they did not have enough power to reopen it. Martha is kidnapped by two motorists in flying cars to grant them access to the fast lane on the Motorway. The fast lane is infested by crab-like Macra, old enemies of the Doctor and the former rulers of an empire in this galaxy who have since devolved to feeding on the car fumes. Aided by the Face of Boe, who uses the last of his life, the Doctor finds a way of restoring power to the system which opens the roof of the Motorway, finally freeing the trapped inhabitants and saving Martha and her kidnappers from the Macra. Before dying, the Face of Boe tells the Doctor he is not alone.
182a	4	"Daleks in Manhattan"	James Strong	Helen Raynor	21 April 2007	3.4	6.69	86
The Doctor and Martha investigate disappearances in New York's Hooverville in 1930. Mr. Diagoras, a businessman who is working with the Daleks to attach a conductor to the top of the under-construction Empire State Building, arrives to offer work to the homeless. The Doctor volunteers for a 'construction job' in the sewers after hearing that not everyone who goes down there returns. Martha is captured by a pig slave, commanded by the Daleks, to be used as a subject in the Daleks' final experiment in their underground laboratory. Dalek Sec of the Cult of Skaro merges his body with Diagoras, becoming a human-Dalek hybrid.
182b	5	"Evolution of the Daleks"	James Strong	Helen Raynor	28 April 2007	3.5	6.97	85
The Doctor frees a group of the kidnapped humans, including Martha, from the Daleks' laboratory. The Daleks plan to implant the other kidnapped and mind-wiped humans with Dalek ideas and Dalek DNA to create a new stage of Dalek evolution, powered by a strike of gamma radiation conducted by the Empire State Building. Sec hopes to give emotions to this new race of Dalek humans after these were originally removed from the Daleks. The other Daleks betray and murder Sec, as this action would no longer make Daleks "supreme". The Doctor interferes with the gamma strike on the Empire State Building's mast, adding Time Lord DNA to the awakened Dalek-human army controlled by Dalek Caan. The Dalek-humans betray and kill two of the remaining Daleks, and Caan destroys the army and escapes from the Doctor.
183	6	"The Lazarus Experiment"	Richard Clark	Stephen Greenhorn	5 May 2007	3.6	7.19	86
76-year-old Professor Richard Lazarus demonstrates his experiment where he uses hypersonic sound waves to restore his youth and cheat death. The experiment mutates his DNA, unlocking dormant genes in his body and turning him into an evolutionary throwback that drains life energy from his victims. The Doctor reflects the energy of Lazarus' sonic micro-field manipulator onto Lazarus, causing him to flee to Southwark Cathedral. The Doctor uses the acoustics of the cathedral to create sound waves from the church organ, which causes Lazarus to fall from the bell tower, finally killing him. The Doctor invites Martha to travel with him full-time rather than her just being a passenger.
184	7	"42"	Graeme Harper	Chris Chibnall	19 May 2007	3.7	7.41	85
Half a universe from Earth, the Doctor and Martha answer a distress call from the cargo ship SS Pentallian, which will impact a star in 42 minutes. The ship's crew had scooped out part of the star, which is alive, for cheap fuel. The star uses crew members Korwin and Ashton as host bodies, and begins taking out everyone on board. Martha and crew member Riley, while trying to reach the front of the ship, are jettisoned into space in an escape pod by Ashton. The Doctor remagnetises the pod to bring Martha and Riley back. The Doctor begins being taken over by the star, and tells Martha to vent the engines, getting rid of the "sun particles" in the fuel. This causes the engines to start working again, and frees the ship from the star's pull.
185a	8	"Human Nature"	Charles Palmer	Paul Cornell	26 May 2007	3.8	7.74	86
The Doctor is pursued by the Family of Blood, entities who hope to use his power of regeneration to live forever. To escape them, he transforms himself into a human and invents a new identity called John Smith, who becomes a schoolteacher in 1913 England who dreams of his life as the Doctor and writes these dreams down in a journal. The Doctor's true self is hidden in a fob watch, which when opened will turn Smith back into the Doctor. Martha takes care of Smith while she is undercover as a maid. After two months, the Family arrive and take over the bodies of four humans. When the fob watch goes missing, taken by one of the schoolboys who is slightly psychic, Martha tries prompting Smith to recall his past, inadvertently revealing his true identity to the Family. The Family hold Martha and Smith's date, Nurse Joan Redfern, hostage at the village dance, hoping to force Smith to change back to the Doctor.
185b	9	"The Family of Blood"	Charles Palmer	Paul Cornell	2 June 2007	3.9	7.21	86
Timothy Latimer, a telepathic student who can hear the voices in the fob watch, distracts the Family by briefly opening the fob watch, which he is keeping hidden from the Family, allowing Smith, Martha and Redfern to escape the dance hall. They flee to an abandoned house after the Family attack the school, and are followed there by Latimer. The Family bombard the village with their spaceship to draw the Doctor out. Smith opens the fob watch, becoming the Doctor again. The Doctor overloads the Family's spaceship while misdirecting them. He gives them the eternal life they wished, while imprisoning the Father in unbreakable chains, the Mother in the event horizon of a collapsing galaxy, and the Daughter in every mirror. He suspends the Son in time, and dresses him up as a scarecrow. Redfern turns down the Doctor's invitation to go travelling with him.
186	10	"Blink"	Hettie MacDonald	Steven Moffat	9 June 2007	3.10	6.62	87
The Doctor and Martha are sent back in time to 1969 by the stonelike Weeping Angels. The Doctor records a message containing half of a conversation to be included as Easter eggs on DVDs published by another of the Angels' victims. In 2007 London, photographer Sally Sparrow investigates an abandoned house, finding a message from the Doctor and taking a key from an Angel's hand. The Angels follow Sally, who discovers the TARDIS in a police impoundment garage. The Angels take the TARDIS back to the house. Sally and her friend's brother Larry have the other half of the conversation with the Doctor's message from one of the DVDs. He tells them to send the TARDIS back to him in 1969. The Angels have locked the entrances to the house, so Sally and Larry flee to the cellar, where they find the TARDIS. Using the key to get inside, Larry inserts the DVD, functioning as a control disc, into a slot on the console. The TARDIS departs for 1969, and Sally and Larry are left behind in the cellar, but find the Angels, now all looking at each other, have been frozen because of their biological defence mechanism that turns them to stone when observed. A year later, Sally gives a transcript of the message to the Doctor before the Angels attack him.
187a	11	"Utopia"	Graeme Harper	Russell T Davies	16 June 2007	3.11	7.84	87
The TARDIS parks in Cardiff to refuel itself with energy from a time rift. The Doctor's former companion Captain Jack Harkness jumps onto the outside of the TARDIS, making it travel to the planet Malcassairo at the end of the universe, 100 trillion years in the future. Surrounded by a group called the Futurekind, the Doctor, Martha and Jack escape for the safety of Silo 16, where the last of humanity waits to board a rocket to "Utopia". The Doctor powers up the engines, and Jack fixes the rocket's couplings, making it viable for launch. Martha notices that Professor Yana, the rocket’s designer, has a fob watch exactly like the one which turned the Doctor into a human. Yana notices the watch and opens it, changing his biology back into his true identity: a Time Lord called the Master. The Master and Yana's assistant Chantho mortally wound each other, and the Master regenerates. As the rocket takes off, the Master steals the Doctor's TARDIS, stranding the Doctor, Martha and Jack in the silo with the Futurekind.
187b	12	"The Sound of Drums"	Colin Teague	Russell T Davies	23 June 2007	3.12	7.51	87
Using Jack's repaired vortex manipulator, the Doctor, Martha, and Jack land in present-day London the day after a general election. The Master has hypnotised the world with a network of mobile phone satellites called Archangel, allowing him to be elected Prime Minister of the United Kingdom. He imprisons Martha's family on board the flying aircraft carrier the Valiant, on which he intends to televise first contact with a race he calls the Toclafane the following morning. The Doctor, Martha, and Jack fail to unmask the Master, and the Master takes the Doctor and Jack as prisoners. An invasion force of billions of Toclafane come to Earth. The Master orders them to wipe out a tenth of Earth's population. Martha escapes to the surface using Jack's vortex manipulator.
187c	13	"Last of the Time Lords"	Colin Teague	Russell T Davies	30 June 2007	3.13	8.61	88
One year later, Martha returns to England. The Master is readying a fleet of rockets to attack other worlds. Tricking the Master into bringing her on board the Valiant, Martha turns the Master's mind-control satellite technology against him; having travelled the world to gather support for the captured and weakened Doctor, she has instructed them to think of the Doctor just as the Master intends to launch his fleet, so that their combined thoughts, travelling through the network, are able to rejuvenate him. Jack destroys the paradox machine that originally brought the Toclafane—the descendants of humanity regressed to a childlike form—to the 21st century. This undoes the events of the previous year. Lucy Saxon, the Master's wife, shoots and kills the Master. The Doctor cremates his body. Jack decides to return to the Torchwood Institute in Cardiff, and Martha stays behind to look after her family.

=== Supplemental episode ===
A 13-part animated serial, The Infinite Quest, was produced and broadcast as part of the children's programme Totally Doctor Who on CBBC, leading up to the finale of series 3. Each instalment was approximately 3.5 minutes in length and, when compiled, was equivalent to a normal episode. The serial was broadcast in its entirety on 30 June 2007 and later released on DVD. The serial was animated by company Firestep. Another animated serial, Dreamland, would later be produced and aired in six parts on BBC Red Button in 2009.

PopMatters's Evan Sawdey criticised the story as having lacklustre animation, as well as having few exciting moments that would warrant the animated setting. Graeme Burke, in the book Who Is the Doctor: The Unofficial Guide to Doctor Who: The New Series, found some artwork in the story decent, but otherwise found the story dull and the voice performances of the cast mediocre. His co-author, Stacey Smith?, concurred that the story was not very exciting.

No.	Title	Directed by	Written by	Original release date	UK viewers (millions)
1	The Infinite Quest	Gary Russell	Alan Barnes	2 April – June 30, 2007	0.6–0.9
After thwarting an invasion by an alien named Baltazar (Anthony Head), the Tenth Doctor and Martha are enlisted by his bird, Caw (Toby Longworth), to seek down three data chips that will lead them to The Infinite, a ship said to be able to grant anyone's heart's desire. Baltazar and Caw are in league, and Baltazar tracks them down and takes the Doctor and Martha hostage, with Caw being killed while protecting Martha. The trio arrive on The Infinite, where they discover that the desires promised are actually illusions conjured up by the ship. The Doctor and Martha destroy the ship and flee while Baltazar is sent to another planet to pay for his crimes.

== Casting ==
=== Main characters ===
Actress and comedian Catherine Tate was cast as one-off companion Donna Noble for the Christmas special. At the end of the episode the character turns down the chance to travel in the TARDIS, but Tate later reprised her role and returned for a full series starting in the 2008 episode "Partners in Crime".

Following the departure of Billie Piper as Rose Tyler at the end of Series 2, a new full-time companion was needed. On 5 July 2006, the BBC confirmed that Freema Agyeman would join the show as new companion Martha Jones. Agyeman had previously appeared in the 2006 episode "Army of Ghosts" as a different character. John Barrowman also returned as Captain Jack Harkness for the three-part series finale.

=== Guest stars ===
Recurring guest stars for the series included Adjoa Andoh, Trevor Laird, Gugu Mbatha-Raw, and Reggie Yates, who portrayed Martha's family. Derek Jacobi and John Simm portray The Master, Simm doing so in three episodes.

Other guest stars included Thelma Barlow, Ryan Carnes, Matthew Chambers, Chipo Chung, Christina Cole, Michelle Collins, Lenora Crichlow, Anthony Flanagan, Andrew Garfield, Lucy Gaskell, Mark Gatiss, Don Gilet, Jennifer Hennessy, Anna Hope, Gerard Horan, Jessica Hynes, Dean Lennox Kelly, Matt King, Chris Larkin, Harry Lloyd, Eric Loren, Stephen Marcus, Roy Marsden, McFly, Alexandra Moen, Carey Mulligan, Michael Obiora, Ardal O'Hanlon, Travis Oliver, Sharon Osbourne, Sarah Parish, Angela Pleasence, Hugh Quarshie, Miranda Raison, Anne Reid, Finlay Robertson, Thomas Sangster, Rebekah Staton, and Ann Widdecombe.

== Production ==
=== Development ===
The Doctor Who title card for series 3, slightly modified from that used in the first two series, and used until David Tennant's final episode in 2010.

Following the success of the first series, the BBC announced that Doctor Who had been recommissioned for a third series on 16 June 2005, only two months after the announcement of the second series. Recording for the Christmas special began on 4 July 2006, with production on the series itself beginning on 8 August 2006 and concluding on 2 April 2007.

Murray Gold composed the music, with orchestration by Ben Foster.

=== Writing ===
First-time writers for the show included Gareth Roberts, who previously wrote the interactive episode "Attack of the Graske" and the Tardisodes, Helen Raynor, one of the show's script editors, Chris Chibnall, the head writer and co-producer of spin-off series Torchwood, and Stephen Greenhorn. Previous writers Paul Cornell, Steven Moffat, and Russell T Davies all contributed to the series, with Davies continuing to act as head writer and executive producer. Phil Collinson and Susie Liggat acted as producers, with Julie Gardner as executive producer. Euros Lyn, Charles Palmer, Richard Clark, James Strong, Graeme Harper, Hettie MacDonald, and Colin Teague directed episodes in the series.

The episodes in series three are arranged in a loose story arc: "Mr Saxon", an alias for the Master. The character's name was first mentioned in "The Runaway Bride" when the Ministry of Defence shot down an alien craft at Saxon's request. Several elements from episodes in the series contribute to the three-part finale: the events of "The Lazarus Experiment" and "42" were directly influenced by the Master; the Face of Boe's prophecy is directly related to Master; and a similar fob watch that was used by the Doctor to change his Time Lord biology into human was also used by the Master to hide from the Time Lords.

Several stories were scrapped during production. An episode proposed for the show's second series, written by Stephen Fry, would have focused on the Arthurian legend of the Green Knight, but was pushed back to the third series. This was ultimately scrapped due to Fry's commitments on Kingdom. Another episode, "The Suicide Exhibition", written by Mark Gatiss, would have had a Nazi task force assault London's Natural History Museum, which had been overrun by monsters; a secret chamber would have been discovered beneath the museum. This was pushed back to the show's fourth series before being ultimately scrapped.

=== Filming ===
Production blocks were arranged as follows:

Block	Episode(s)	Director	Writer(s)	Producer	Code
1	Christmas special: "The Runaway Bride"	Euros Lyn	Russell T Davies	Phil Collinson	3X
2	Episode 1: "Smith and Jones"	Charles Palmer	Russell T Davies	Phil Collinson	3.1
2	Episode 2: "The Shakespeare Code"	Charles Palmer	Gareth Roberts	Phil Collinson	3.2
3	Episode 3: "Gridlock"	Richard Clark	Russell T Davies	Phil Collinson	3.3
3	Episode 6: "The Lazarus Experiment"	Richard Clark	Stephen Greenhorn	Phil Collinson	3.6
4	Episode 4: "Daleks in Manhattan"	James Strong	Helen Raynor	Phil Collinson	3.4
4	Episode 5: "Evolution of the Daleks"	James Strong	Helen Raynor	Phil Collinson	3.5
5	Episode 10: "Blink"	Hettie MacDonald	Steven Moffat	Phil Collinson	3.10
6	Episode 8: "Human Nature"	Charles Palmer	Paul Cornell	Susie Liggat	3.8
6	Episode 9: "The Family of Blood"	Charles Palmer	Paul Cornell	Susie Liggat	3.9
7	Episode 7: "42"	Graeme Harper	Chris Chibnall	Phil Collinson	3.7
7	Episode 11: "Utopia"	Graeme Harper	Russell T Davies	Phil Collinson	3.11
8	Episode 12: "The Sound of Drums"	Colin Teague	Russell T Davies	Phil Collinson	3.12
8	Episode 13: "Last of the Time Lords"	Colin Teague	Russell T Davies	Phil Collinson	3.13

An animated serial, The Infinite Quest, was also produced alongside the series and was broadcast as part of the CBBC programme Totally Doctor Who.

== Release ==
=== Broadcast ===
The third series premiered on 31 March 2007 with "Smith and Jones", and concluded after 13 episodes on 30 June 2007 with "Last of the Time Lords". The series was initially planned to conclude a week earlier, but on 2 May 2007, episodes 7–13 were pushed back a week due to the Eurovision Song Contest 2007, rather than air "42" in an earlier timeslot. Doctor Who Confidential also aired alongside each episode of the series, continuing on from the previous series.

=== Home media ===
All releases are for DVD unless otherwise indicated:

- ^{(D)} indicates a DVD release for a specific date
- ^{(B)} indicates a Blu-ray release

Series	Story no.	Episode name	Duration	Release date		
Series	Story no.	Episode name	Duration	R2	R4	R1
3	178	Doctor Who : "The Runaway Bride"	1 × 60 min.	2 April 2007	4 July 2007	—N/a
3	179–181	Doctor Who : Series 3, Volume 1 "Smith and Jones" – "Gridlock"	3 × 45 min.	21 May 2007	1 August 2007	—N/a
3	182–184	Doctor Who : Series 3, Volume 2 "Daleks in Manhattan" – "42"	4 × 45 min.	25 June 2007	5 September 2007	—N/a
3	185–186	Doctor Who : Series 3, Volume 3 "Human Nature" – "Blink"	3 × 45 min.	23 July 2007	3 October 2007	—N/a
3	187	Doctor Who : Series 3, Volume 4 "Utopia" / "The Sound of Drums" / "Last of the Time Lords"	2 × 45 min. 1 × 52 min.	20 August 2007	7 November 2007	—N/a
3	178–187	Doctor Who : The Complete Third Series (includes "The Runaway Bride")	1 × 60 min. 12 × 45 min. 1 × 52 min.	5 November 2007 ^{(D)} 4 December 2013 ^{(B)} (Note: Part of The Complete Series 1–7); 31 August 2015 ^{(B)}	5 December 2007 ^{(D)} 4 December 2013 ^{(B)}	6 November 2007 ^{(D)} 5 November 2013 ^{(B)}
3	178–183	Doctor Who : Series 3, Part 1 "The Runaway Bride" – "The Lazarus Experiment"	1 × 60 min. 6 × 45 min.	—N/a	—N/a	10 June 2014
3	184–187	Doctor Who : Series 3, Part 2 "42" – "Last of the Time Lords"	6 × 45 min. 1 × 52 min.	—N/a	—N/a	8 July 2014
2, 3, 4, 2008–2010 specials	167–202	Doctor Who: The Complete David Tennant Years	5 × 6 min. 2 × 7 min. 1 × 8 min. 1 × 12 min. 35 × 45 min. 4 × 50 min. 6 × 60 min. 1 × 65 min. 1 × 72 min. 1 × 75 min.	10 November 2014	—N/a	11 October 2011^{(D)} 17 September 2019^{(B)}

== Reception ==
=== Critical reception ===
Doctor Who's third series received acclaim and positive reviews from critics. Arnold T. Blumberg of IGN gave an overwhelmingly positive review of the third series. He praised the acting of Tennant, Agyeman, and John Simm, describing Simm's portrayal as "a master stroke". Overall he said, "With an assured air earned by success, Series 3 of Doctor Who is a tour de force excursion across time and space...it doesn't get much better than this". He gave the series 9 out of 10 (Amazing). Nick Lyons of DVD Talk gave a positive review saying, "series three is on par with the last two seasons of the new series". He said that the character of Martha and series three, "will no doubt please fans". He gave the series 4 and a half stars out of 5.

=== Awards and nominations ===
Year	Award	Category	Nominee(s)	Result	Ref(s)
2007	Edinburgh International Television Festival	Best Programme of the Year	Doctor Who	Won	
2007	Glenfiddich Spirit of Scotland Awards	Screen Award	David Tennant	Won	
2007	Monte-Carlo Television Festival	Outstanding Actor in a Drama Series	David Tennant	Nominated	
2007	Monte-Carlo Television Festival	Outstanding Actress in a Drama Series	Freema Agyeman	Nominated	
2007	National Television Awards	Most Popular Drama	Doctor Who	Won	
2007	National Television Awards	Most Popular Actor	David Tennant	Won	
2007	National Television Awards	Most Popular Actress	Freema Agyeman	Nominated	
2007	Nebula Awards	Best Script	Steven Moffat for "Blink"	Nominated	
2007	Saturn Awards	Best International Series	Doctor Who	Won	
2007	Scream Awards	Best TV Show	Doctor Who	Nominated	
2007	TV Quick Awards	Best Loved Drama	Doctor Who	Won	
2007	TV Quick Awards	Best Actor	David Tennant	Won	
2007	TV Quick Awards	Best Actress	Freema Agyeman	Nominated	
2007	Writers' Guild of Great Britain	Best Soap/Series	Chris Chibnall, Paul Cornell, Russell T Davies, Stephen Greenhorn, Steven Moffat, Helen Raynor and Gareth Roberts	Won	
2008	BAFTA Cymru Awards	Best Drama Series	Doctor Who	Won	
2008	BAFTA Cymru Awards	Best Director of Photography: Drama	Doctor Who	Won	
2008	BAFTA Cymru Awards	Best Costume	Louise Page for "The Shakespeare Code"	Nominated	
2008	BAFTA Cymru Awards	Best Make-Up	Doctor Who	Won	
2008	BAFTA Cymru Awards	Best Sound	Doctor Who	Won	
2008	BAFTA Cymru Awards	Best Director: Drama	Doctor Who	Won	
2008	BAFTA Cymru Awards	Best Screenwriter	Steven Moffat	Won	
2008	British Academy Television Awards	Best Writer	Steven Moffat for "Blink"	Won	
2008	British Academy Television Awards	Best Original Television Music	Murray Gold	Nominated	
2008	British Academy Television Awards	Best Sound Fiction/Entertainment	BBC Wales Sound Team	Nominated	
2008	Constellation Awards	Best Science Fiction Television Series of 2007	Doctor Who	Won	
2008	Constellation Awards	Best Male Performance in a 2007 Science Fiction Television Episode	David Tennant for "Human Nature" / "The Family of Blood"	Won	
2008	Constellation Awards	Best Female Performance in a 2007 Science Fiction Television Episode	Carey Mulligan for "Blink"	Won	
2008	Hugo Awards	Best Dramatic Presentation	"Blink"	Won	
2008	Hugo Awards	Best Dramatic Presentation	"Human Nature" / "The Family of Blood"	Nominated	
2008	TRIC Awards	TV Drama Programme	Doctor Who	Nominated	
2008	VES Awards	Outstanding Visual Effects in a Broadcast Miniseries, Movie or Special	David Houghton, Will Cohen, Nicolas Hernandez and Sara Bennett for "Voyage of the Damned"	Nominated	
2008	VES Awards	Outstanding Visual Effects in a Broadcast Series	David Houghton, Will Cohen, Jean-Claude Deguara and Nicolas Hernandez for "Last of the Time Lords"	Nominated	
2008	VES Awards	Outstanding Animated Character in a Live Action Broadcast Program or Commercial	Nicolas Hernandez, Adam Burnett, Neil Roche and Jean-Claude Deguara for "Last of the Time Lords"	Nominated	

== Soundtrack ==
Selected pieces of score from this series (and "Voyage of the Damned"), as composed by Murray Gold, were released on 5 November 2007 by Silva Screen Records. Unlike the score for Series 2, which still relied heavily on orchestral samples, the soundtrack for Series 3 was performed mainly by the BBC National Orchestra of Wales, with vocal performances by the Crouch End Festival Chorus.

Doctor Who: Series 3

Soundtrack album by Murray Gold, Ben Foster and the BBC National Orchestra of Wales
- Released: 5 November 2007
- Recorded: 2006–2007
- Genre: Soundtrack
- Length: 74:18
- Label: Silva Screen Records
- Producers: Murray Gold and Ben Foster

Doctor Who soundtrack chronology
Original Television Soundtrack (2006)	Series 3 (2007)	Series 4 (2008)

Disc 1
No.	Title	Episode	Length
1.	"All the Strange, Strange Creatures (The Trailer Music)"	"Gridlock", "Daleks in Manhattan", "42", "The Family of Blood", "The Sound of Drums"	04:07
2.	"Martha's Theme"	"Smith and Jones"	03:42
3.	"Drowning Dry"	"The Shakespeare Code"	01:54
4.	"The Carrionites Swarm"	"The Shakespeare Code"	03:23
5.	"Gridlocked Cassinis"	"Gridlock"	01:17
6.	"Boe"	"Gridlock", "Last of the Time Lords"	03:43
7.	"Evolution of the Daleks"	"Daleks in Manhattan" / "Evolution of the Daleks"	01:53
8.	"My Angel Put the Devil in Me (performed by Yamit Mamo)"	"Daleks in Manhattan"	03:08
9.	"Mr Smith and Joan"	"Human Nature" / "The Family of Blood"	02:05
10.	"Only Martha Knows"	"Human Nature" / "The Family of Blood"	02:31
11.	"Smith's Choice"	"Human Nature"	01:42
12.	"Just Scarecrows to War"	"Human Nature" / "The Family of Blood"	01:30
13.	"Miss Joan Redfern"	"The Family of Blood"	01:51
14.	"The Dream of a Normal Death"	"Human Nature" / "The Family of Blood"	01:56
15.	"The Doctor Forever"	Various	04:19
16.	"Blink (Suite)"	"Blink"	02:55
17.	"The Runaway Bride"	"The Runaway Bride"	04:18
18.	"After the Chase"	"The Runaway Bride"	01:26
19.	"The Futurekind"	"Utopia"	01:44
20.	"YANA (Excerpt)"	"Utopia"	00:54
21.	"The Master Vainglorious"	"Utopia" / "The Sound of Drums" / "Last of the Time Lords"	03:22
22.	"Martha's Quest"	"Utopia" / "The Sound of Drums" / "Last of the Time Lords"	03:19
23.	"This Is Gallifrey: Our Childhood, Our Home"	"Utopia" / "The Sound of Drums" / "Last of the Time Lords"	03:17
24.	"Martha Triumphant"	"Last of the Time Lords"	02:49
25.	"Donna's Theme"	"The Runaway Bride"	03:14
26.	"The Stowaway (performed by Yamit Mamo)"	"Voyage of the Damned"	03:36
27.	"The Master Tape"	"The Sound of Drums" / "Last of the Time Lords"	01:55
28.	"Abide with Me"	"Gridlock"	02:28
Total length:			74:18

== Bibliography ==
- Pixley, Andrew (22 November 2007). "Series Three Companion". Doctor Who Magazine. No. 17 – Special Edition.
