= Doomsday (Doctor Who) =

2006 episode of Doctor Who

177b – "Doomsday"
- Doctor Who episode
- A three-way fight between Humanity, Cybermen and Daleks.

Cast
- Doctor: David Tennant – Tenth Doctor
- Companion: Billie Piper – Rose Tyler
- Others: Camille Coduri – Jackie Tyler; Noel Clarke – Mickey Smith; Shaun Dingwall – Pete Tyler; Andrew Hayden-Smith – Jake Simmonds; Tracy-Ann Oberman – Yvonne Hartman; Raji James – Dr Rajesh Singh; Paul Kasey – Cyber Leader; Nicholas Briggs – Dalek/Cybermen Voices; Barnaby Edwards, Nicholas Pegg, Stuart Crossman, Anthony Spargo, Dan Barrett, David Hankinson – Dalek Operators; Catherine Tate – The Bride

Production
- Directed by: Graeme Harper
- Written by: Russell T Davies
- Produced by: Phil Collinson
- Executive producers: Russell T Davies; Julie Gardner
- Music by: Murray Gold
- Series: Series 2
- Running time: 2nd of 2-part story, 45 minutes
- First broadcast: 8 July 2006

Chronology
← Preceded by "Army of Ghosts"	Followed by → "The Runaway Bride"

"Doomsday" is the thirteenth and final episode in the second series of the revival of the British science fiction television programme Doctor Who. It was first broadcast on 8 July 2006 and is the conclusion of a two-part story; the first part, "Army of Ghosts", was broadcast on 1 July 2006. The two-part story features the Daleks, presumed extinct after the events of the 2005 series' finale, and the Cybermen, who appeared in a parallel universe in the 2006 episodes "Rise of the Cybermen" and "The Age of Steel". Both species unexpectedly arrive on Earth at the conclusion of "Army of Ghosts".

The episode marks the first conflict between the Daleks and the Cybermen in Doctor Who's 43-year history; the concept of the two species appearing on-screen together was first proposed in 1967, but was vetoed by Terry Nation, the creator of the Daleks. The episode also features Billie Piper's last appearance in the lead companion role as Rose Tyler; the final regular appearance of Noel Clarke as Rose's ex-boyfriend and previous companion Mickey Smith; and the first appearance of Catherine Tate as Donna Noble, the companion in the following episode, the fourth series and the sixtieth anniversary specials. The episode and its predecessor were filmed between November 2005 and January 2006, alongside the episodes "Rise of the Cybermen" and "The Age of Steel".

Set mainly in the One Canada Square skyscraper in Canary Wharf, the episode's plot consists mostly of the Daleks and Cybermen waging a global war, with humanity on the verge of extinction in the cataclysm. The Tenth Doctor (David Tennant), the Tyler family, and Mickey Smith fight for their lives trying to reverse the situation. They are successful, but at an emotional cost to the Doctor and Rose, as they are left in separate universes.

The episode is one of the most popular Doctor Who episodes since the show's revival. It was nominated, along with "Army of Ghosts", for the 2007 Hugo Award for Best Dramatic Presentation, Short Form; the award was won by the fourth episode in the series, "The Girl in the Fireplace". It shared the revived series' highest Audience Appreciation rating of 89 with "The Parting of the Ways", "Silence in the Library", and "Forest of the Dead" until 28 June 2008—"The Stolen Earth" gained an AI rating of 91—and is favoured by most critics for both the Dalek–Cyberman conflict and the farewell scene between the Doctor and Rose.

== Plot ==
In the Torchwood Institute's sphere chamber in One Canada Square, (Note: Referred to in this episode as Torchwood Tower.) four Daleks known as the Cult of Skaro have emerged from the Void ship, along with the Genesis Ark, a prison ship built by the Time Lords to imprison the Daleks. The Cybermen who took control of Torchwood confront Dalek Thay, offering an alliance. It declines, killing two Cybermen. The Cyber Leader declares war on the Daleks.

A strike team takes the Tenth Doctor to the parallel Earth (Note: This parallel Earth appeared in the 2006 episodes "Rise of the Cybermen" and "The Age of Steel".) to meet with Pete Tyler. The Doctor theorises that millions of Cybermen coming through from the parallel Earth to the Earth in the Doctor's universe is beginning the process that will lead to both planets falling into the Void. The Doctor explains that Pete is dead in his universe, (Note: As depicted in the 2005 episode "Father's Day".) but Pete's wife Jackie is alive.

In the sphere chamber, the Doctor allows the Cybermen to enter and attack the Daleks. Mickey accidentally activates the Ark while escaping with the Doctor, Pete and Rose. Dalek Sec takes the Ark outside. Pete saves Jackie from the Cybermen and the two embrace. The Doctor then takes everyone to the control room. Outside, the Ark opens. Millions of Daleks pour out and begin killing humans and Cybermen on the ground.

The Doctor explains that if he opens the breach and reverses it, anyone who has travelled between the two separate worlds will be pulled in, including Rose, Mickey and Pete. The Doctor sends them along with Jackie to the parallel Earth. Rose jumps back to help the Doctor. The Doctor and Rose open the breach and hang on to magnetic clamps as the Cybermen and Daleks are pulled into the Void, but Dalek Sec escapes using a temporal shift. (Note: The 2007 episode "Daleks in Manhattan" reveals that all four of the Cult of Skaro survive the battle.) Rose loses her grip and starts to fall towards the Void, but at the last second, Pete transports Rose back to the parallel Earth as the breach is closed.

Some time later, Rose has a dream where she hears the Doctor's voice calling her. Rose, her parents, and Mickey follow the voice to a remote bay in Norway where the Doctor sends a holographic message through one last small breach between universes. Rose breaks down in tears and tells the Doctor that she loves him; before the Doctor can finish his reply, the breach seals completely and the Doctor's image disappears. In the TARDIS, a mysterious woman in a wedding dress appears in front of the Doctor. (Note: Credited as "the Bride" and unidentified on screen, this character is named Donna Noble in the following episode "The Runaway Bride".)

== Production ==
=== Conception ===
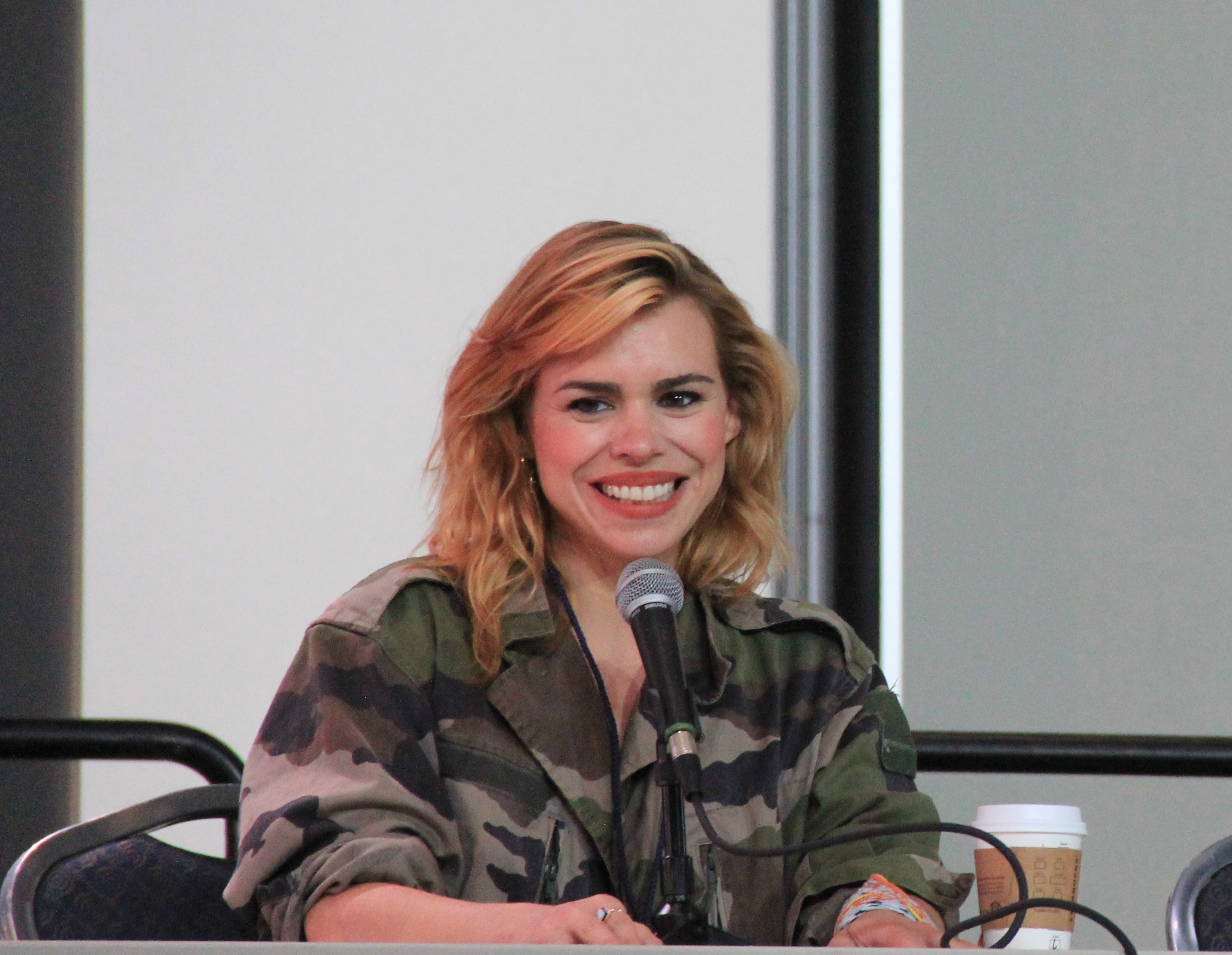
Doomsday featured the departure of Rose Tyler portrayed by Billie Piper (pictured) who made the decision to leave the role a year prior.

The concept of the Daleks and Cybermen appearing together on screen is not new; in December 1967, the BBC approached Terry Nation to have both races in a serial, but Nation vetoed this idea. The concept came to Russell T Davies while mapping out the 2006 series as showrunner: the story would both serve to resurrect the popular Daleks and provide a suitable exit for Piper, who had decided to leave Doctor Who after two series. "Doomsday" is the first episode in the history of Doctor Who where the Cybermen and the Daleks appear on-screen together; Cybermen and Daleks were both featured in "The Five Doctors" and "Army of Ghosts", but in separate scenes.

The two-part finale was originally going to take place in Cardiff on the time rift, which was the focus of the episodes "The Unquiet Dead" and "Boom Town". When Torchwood was commissioned in 2005, Davies decided to base the spin-off in Cardiff and relocate "Army of Ghosts" and "Doomsday" to Canary Wharf in London.

An item of discussion between the production staff was over who would rescue Rose; Davies and Julie Gardner wanted Pete to rescue her, while Clarke and Phil Collinson wanted Mickey. The role was ultimately given to Pete, to emphasise that he had accepted Rose as a surrogate daughter. The Doctor's intended reply to Rose was also discussed; Davies, who left the reply unspecified, stated he didn't know when asked by Collinson on the episode's commentary track, and Gardner vehemently believed the Doctor would reciprocate Rose's love.

Some elements of the story were inspired by Philip Pullman's His Dark Materials trilogy. Pullman was "flattered" by the references in the episode, and compared Davies' actions to his own practice of referencing works.

=== Filming ===
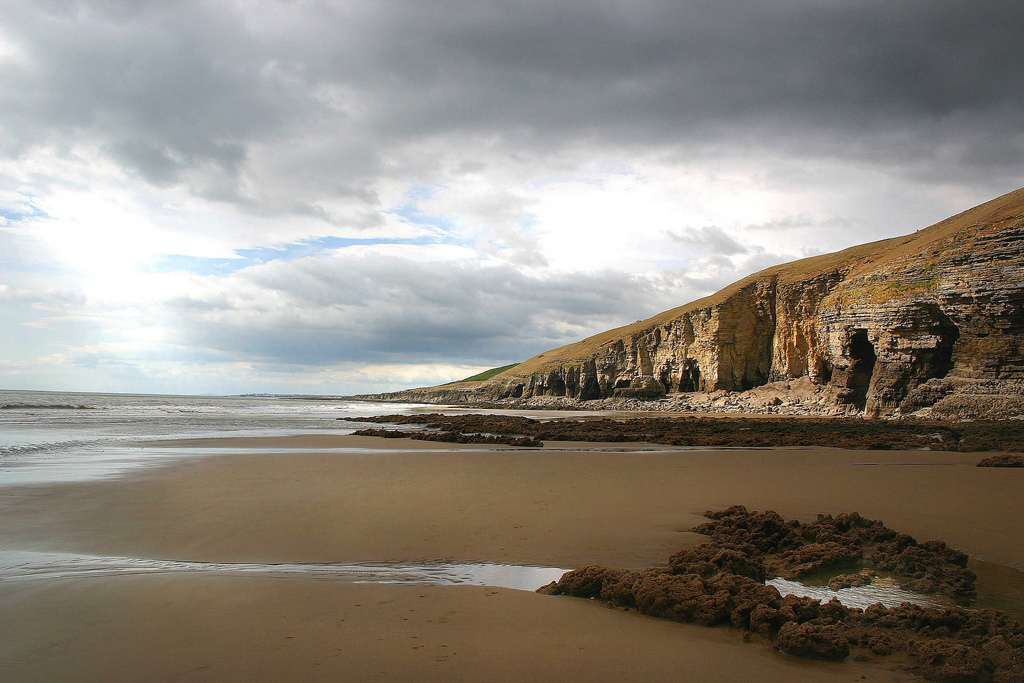
Southerndown beach in Wales was used as the backdrop to the Doctor's farewell to Rose Tyler.

To ensure that Clarke and Dingwall were available for filming, the story was filmed in the season's third production block with "Rise of the Cybermen" and "The Age of Steel". Filming for the story started on 2 November 2005 on location in Kennington, London, but did not become the primary focus of the production crew until 29 November, when filming began on the scenes in and around the sphere chamber. The scenes of the Tyler family residence in Pete's World were filmed at Coedarhydyglyn on 21 November, and the subsequent scene of the Tylers driving through Norway was filmed at Bridgend on 6 December. Scenes in the lever room, the main setting for the story, were filmed on 12–15 December 2005 and 3–5 January 2006. Greenscreen work for Rose being sucked into the void took place on 13 January, and the skirmish between the military and Cybermen on the bridge was filmed on 15 January.

Other location shooting took place at the Coal Exchange and Mount Stuart Square, Cardiff Bay. The penultimate scene of the episode, the Doctor's farewell to Rose, was filmed on 16 January 2006 at Southerndown beach in the Vale of Glamorgan, which was the last day of filming for Clarke and Dingwall. The last scene of "Doomsday", Catherine Tate's appearance in the TARDIS as Donna Noble (credited as "The Bride"), was filmed on 31 March during the wrap party. To ensure the secrecy of Rose's departure and Tate's appearance, only Piper and Tennant were given scripts of the departure scene, and director Graeme Harper was not informed of the final scene until the last possible second.

=== Music ===
"Doomsday"
The beginning of the song "Doomsday".

As well as using existing music, such as the themes for the Daleks, Cybermen, and Rose, Murray Gold specially composed a piece of music for Rose's farewell entitled "Doomsday", which featured vocal work from Melanie Pappenheim. Instead of using the swelling violins that Davies and the rest of the production team had expected, Gold took a minimalist approach. When pitching the track to the production team, Gold described the track as representing Rose's unbridled energy and determination as she searches for the Doctor. He later said, "I wanted to get that kind of throbbing, sort of hurt sound of quite emotional rock, because I thought that's what Rose would do if she was hurting and ran up to her bedroom and locked herself in her room and had a good old cry, really." The piece uses the same vocal work from "Rose", when Rose first enters the TARDIS, thus creating a bookend effect. It is a favourite among fans and of executive producer Julie Gardner, and is one of the reasons, along with Pappenheim's overall contribution and the "Song for Ten" from "The Christmas Invasion", that the soundtrack of both series was released several months later.

== Broadcast, reception, and legacy ==
=== Broadcast and pre-airing media blackout ===
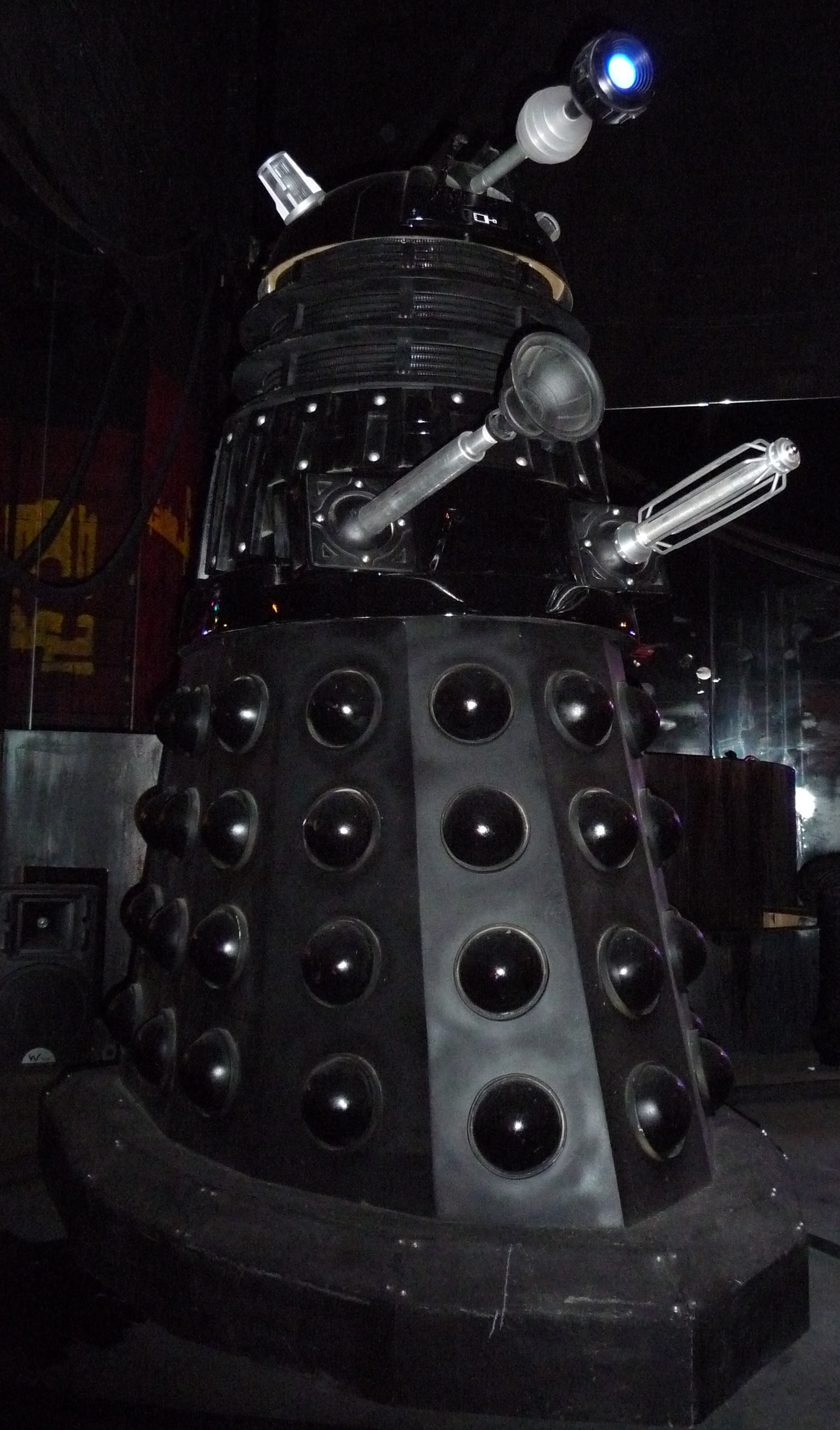
The Dalek Sec prop on display at a Doctor Who exhibition.

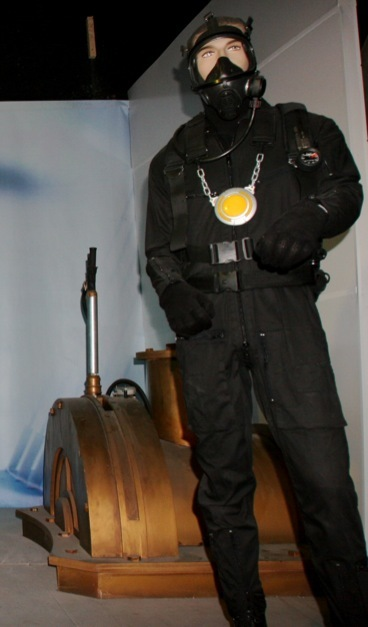
Preacher prop, on display at a Doctor Who exhibition

To protect as much information concerning the episode as possible, the final scene of "Army of Ghosts" was withheld from all pre-screeners given to reviewers. The BBC website's Fear Forecasters, a panel who rate the episodes, were not allowed to see "Doomsday" before its airing, and access to copies was restricted; the website thus does not have a Fear Forecast for the episode. Despite this, the Dalek Sec prop, which had been previously unused in the series, had invaded the stage at the 2006 BAFTA Television Awards while the production team were collecting an award. A similar moratorium would be placed on the following series' finale, "Last of the Time Lords".

The episode's finalised average viewing figure was 8.22 million viewers and was, excepting World Cup games, the second most-watched television programme of the week, behind an episode of Coronation Street, and eighth most-watched overall. The companion episode of Doctor Who Confidential gained just over one million viewers, making it the second most watched programme on a non-terrestrial channel that week. The ratings for the episode were higher than the following World Cup match between Germany and Portugal, which had a million fewer viewers.

=== Critical reception and later release ===
"Doomsday" is one of the most popular episodes of the revived Doctor Who. It gained an audience Appreciation Index (AI) of 89, which was the highest figure for nearly two years—it was later surpassed by "The Stolen Earth", which had an AI of 91—and is the first episode of Doctor Who to receive a perfect 10 rating on IGN, who congratulated Davies on making an action-packed episode so emotional. Television Without Pity gave the episode an A+ rating. The Stage commented that the Dalek–Cybermen conflict was the "only thing worth watching" at the weekend, overshadowing even the World Cup Final, and that the parting scene was "beautifully written and movingly played," with "not a dry eye in the universe". Dek Hogan of Digital Spy felt that the episode was "beautifully balanced and with moments of high excitement and touching poignancy" and that the single oil tear shed by the Cyberman version of Hartman was a "nice touch". He criticised Catherine Tate's appearance as being unnecessary to end the episode and for "breaking the mood". Stephen Brook of The Guardian thought that the episode was "a highpoint of the modern series, highly emotional, scary and genuinely exciting", while Rose's departure was "brilliantly handled". He positively compared the episode's plot of a war between "the greatest monsters in the programme history" against the film Alien vs. Predator.

After its initial airing, the episode was released on DVD, with "Fear Her" and "Army of Ghosts", on 25 September 2006. It was first aired on CBC Television on 19 February 2007. The story ("Army of Ghosts" and "Doomsday") was one of three from the second series of Doctor Who to be nominated for the 2007 Hugo Award for Best Dramatic Presentation, Short Form; the other stories nominated were "School Reunion" and "The Girl in the Fireplace", the latter winning the award.

In a 2014 poll by SFX, 90,000 readers voted the farewell scene between the Doctor and Rose as the greatest sci-fi moment ever.
