= Last of the Time Lords =

187c – "Last of the Time Lords"
- Doctor Who episode

Cast
- Doctor: David Tennant – Tenth Doctor
- Companions: Freema Agyeman – Martha Jones; John Barrowman – Jack Harkness
- Others: John Simm – The Master; Alexandra Moen – Lucy Saxon; Adjoa Andoh – Francine Jones; Trevor Laird – Clive Jones; Gugu Mbatha-Raw – Tish Jones; Reggie Yates – Leo Jones; Tom Ellis – Tom Milligan; Ellie Haddington – Professor Docherty; Tom Golding – Lad; Natasha Alexander – Woman; Zoe Thorne, Gerard Logan, and Johnnie Lyne-Pirkis – Toclafane voices

Production
- Directed by: Colin Teague
- Written by: Russell T Davies
- Produced by: Phil Collinson
- Executive producers: Russell T Davies; Julie Gardner
- Music by: Murray Gold
- Production code: 3.13
- Series: Series 3
- Running time: 3rd of 3-part story, 52 minutes
- First broadcast: 30 June 2007

Chronology
← Preceded by "The Sound of Drums"	Followed by → "Voyage of the Damned"

"Last of the Time Lords" is the thirteenth and final episode of the third series of the revived British science fiction television series Doctor Who. It was broadcast on BBC One on 30 June 2007. It is the last of three episodes that form a linked narrative, following "Utopia" and "The Sound of Drums".

The episode is set on Earth one year after the events of "The Sound of Drums". In the episode, the alien time traveller the Master (John Simm) has conquered the Earth and enslaved its population to prepare warships for him to conquer the rest of the universe. The medical student Martha Jones (Freema Agyeman) has spent the previous year travelling the planet as part of a plan to stop the Master.

== Plot ==
A year after the Toclafane attacked Earth and the Master took over the planet, humanity is on the verge of extinction. After her escape from the Valiant, Martha has been travelling around the world and avoiding detection. She has been preparing the surviving humans to concentrate their thoughts on the word "Doctor" the moment of the completion of the countdown to the launch of a fleet of rockets the Master is readying to wage war. The Tenth Doctor meanwhile has been spending a year psychically integrating himself into the Master's Archangel network of satellites, which channels the collective psychic energy of the people to the Doctor. Martha creates a cover story about finding four components to a gun the Master is vulnerable to as part of a plan to have Professor Docherty lead Martha back to the Master.

Martha, together with Docherty and medic Thomas Milligan, capture a Toclafane. Upon examination they discover the Toclafane are humans who took the rocket to Utopia in the future. They cannibalised their bodies into metal spheres and their minds regressed into children. The Master created the Paradox Machine to allow them to return to the past and kill their ancestors while avoiding the grandfather paradox. Martha and Thomas leave to find the last component of the gun in London, and Docherty provides the Master with Martha's location in exchange for information on her son.

After cornering Martha, the Master destroys the gun and takes her back to the Valiant so he can kill her in front of the artificially aged Doctor. The collective psychic energy of the people thinking of the Doctor rejuvenates him, allowing him to overcome his captivity and force the Master to cower in defeat. Jack sets off to destroy the Paradox Machine. The destruction of the machine causes time to snap back right before the Toclafane appeared. The Doctor and his allies consider the Master's fate before the Master is shot by his wife Lucy. The Master dies in the Doctor's arms, and the Doctor cremates his body on a funeral pyre.

The Doctor returns Jack to Torchwood. Martha decides to leave the Doctor so that she can care for her family, who can still remember their captivity on the Valiant. She gives him her mobile phone in case she needs to contact him. Afterwards, the bow of a ship called the Titanic bursts through a wall of the TARDIS control room.

=== Continuity ===
In the episode's commentary, writer Russell T Davies called the implication of Jack's nickname ("the Face of Boe") "a theory" as to the Face of Boe's origins, prompting Executive Producer Julie Gardner to urge him to "stop back-pedalling" about the two characters being the same. Davies also jokingly termed the hand seen removing the Master's ring from the ashes of his funeral pyre "the hand of the Rani". The hand seen picking up the Master's ring was included in order to leave open the possibility of reintroducing the character at a later date.

The Master makes reference to the Sea Devils (which the Third Doctor and the Master encountered together in the 1972 serial The Sea Devils) and the Axons (which they met in 1971's The Claws of Axos). Earth is referred to as Sol 3, the third planet from the star Sol, as it was in The Deadly Assassin (1976).

== Production and publicity ==
"Last of the Time Lords", along with "Utopia" and "The Sound of Drums", are treated in several sources as a three-part story, the first such story in the revived series of Doctor Who. However, Russell T Davies has said that he regards "Utopia" as a separate story, but notes that the determination is arbitrary. "Last of the Time Lords" was a subtitle proposed at one stage for a film version of Doctor Who that was in development from 1987 to 1994.

This episode was planned to be broadcast live to the crowds attending Pride London in Trafalgar Square via a giant screen. However, a local curfew after the nearby attempted terrorist bombing the previous day prevented the screening. Freema Agyeman and John Barrowman attended the event.

In order to keep the episode's details secret, access to preview copies of this episode was restricted. There was a similar moratorium on copies of "Doomsday" the previous year and on the series four finale "Journey's End" the following year. The episode was allocated a 50-minute timeslot for its initial broadcast, as with "Daleks in Manhattan" previously, and 55-minute timeslots for the BBC Three repeats. According to Russell T Davies in Doctor Who Magazine 384, this is because it ran over-length but they did not wish to lose the material. The final episode of The Trial of a Time Lord was also extended by five minutes in 1986. In the audio commentary, the producers reveal that Graeme Harper filled in to direct some scenes after director Colin Teague was injured.

At the start of this episode, The Master enters the bridge of the Valiant as "I Can't Decide" by the Scissor Sisters plays in the background. He refers to it as "track 3", its place on the Scissor Sisters' second album, Ta-Dah. Two sets of audio commentaries were recorded for the episode: one with producers Russell T Davies, Julie Gardner, and Phil Collinson, which was intended for podcast broadcast to coincide with the episode's initial UK telecast, and the other featuring actors David Tennant, Freema Agyeman, and John Barrowman, which was included on the UK DVD release of the episode as part of the Series 3 box set. However, the Region 1 (North America) release of the DVD saw the actor commentary replaced by the earlier podcast version, although a production error resulted in the set's booklet not indicating this substitution (and the booklet also omits Tennant's name). This episode marked the last regular-episode use of the Doctor Who theme music arrangement by Murray Gold that had been introduced in 2005 and used (notwithstanding minor modifications and an extension of the closing theme in 2006) thereafter. The opening theme would be heard once more in its 2005 arrangement in the Time Crash short episode, before both opening and closing themes would be revised beginning with Voyage of the Damned and continuing into Series 4 in 2008.

=== Cast notes ===
Reggie Yates is credited as playing Leo Jones; however, the character Leo only appears in this episode as background. The audio commentary for the episode mentions that Leo was originally scheduled to appear in the sequence showing Martha's return to Britain, but Yates was double-booked. Zoe Thorne also voiced the Gelth in "The Unquiet Dead". Uncredited as the hand that picks up the Master's ring was production manager Tracie Simpson.

== Broadcast and reception ==
Overnight ratings showed that "Last of the Time Lords" was watched by 8 million viewers with a 39% audience share. When finale ratings were calculated, figures rose to 8.61 million viewers. It received an Audience Appreciation Index of 88, considered "excellent" for a drama.

Stephen Brook, writing on The Guardian's blog, said the episode was "certainly an epic conclusion... but not a satisfying one." He felt it was too epic and too rushed, and "the resurrection of the Doctor... left me cold." SFX reviewer Dave Golder gave the episode three and a half out of five stars, concluding that it was "Good solid fun, with some great performances and memorable visuals but possibly the least satisfying New Who finale so far". Though he thought there was "loads to enjoy" such as John Simm as the Master, Freema Agyeman's performance, and the effects, he wished to explore more of the dystopian world and said of the conclusion, "I liked the message it was trying to get across, but the shots of a ghostly Tennant floating down the steps did unfortunately look like something out of a panto."

IGN's Travis Fickett rated "Last of the Time Lords" 8.4 out of 10, believing it the "weakest entry" of the three-part finale, though it had some "fine stuff", especially the final confrontation between the Doctor and Master and Martha's departure. However, he thought the biggest "misstep" was sidelining the Doctor and the "logically muddy" conclusion. Mark Wright of The Stage called it the "weakest of the season finales for Doctor Who to date", with much of the plot being "lazy" or not making sense and "[played] out as silly and lacks substance". While he praised Martha and the emotional climax, he found Jack "criminally underused" and criticised the representation of the aged Doctor. Stephen James Walker, in his book Third Dimension: The Unofficial and Unauthorised Guide to Doctor Who 2007, summed up the episode as "bleak and depressing", and listed the ill treatment of the Doctor, the use of a reset button and the underuse of Captain Jack as among the problems he had with the story.
