= 42 (Doctor Who) =

184 – "42"
- Doctor Who episode

Cast
- Doctor: David Tennant – Tenth Doctor
- Companion: Freema Agyeman – Martha Jones
- Others: Michelle Collins – Kath McDonnell; Adjoa Andoh – Francine Jones; William Ash – Riley Vashtee; Anthony Flanagan – Orin Scannell; Matthew Chambers – Hal Korwin; Vinette Robinson – Abi Lerner; Gary Powell – Dev Ashton; Rebecca Oldfield – Erina Lessak; Elize du Toit – Sinister Woman

Production
- Directed by: Graeme Harper
- Written by: Chris Chibnall
- Produced by: Phil Collinson
- Executive producers: Russell T Davies; Julie Gardner
- Music by: Murray Gold
- Production code: 3.7
- Series: Series 3
- Running time: 45 minutes
- First broadcast: 19 May 2007

Chronology
← Preceded by "The Lazarus Experiment"	Followed by → "Human Nature"

"42" is the seventh episode of the third series of British science fiction television series Doctor Who. It was first broadcast on BBC One on 19 May 2007. It was the first episode of Doctor Who written by Chris Chibnall, who would go on to be the showrunner and lead writer from series 11 to the 2022 specials.

Separated from the TARDIS, the Doctor and Martha face a race against time as they and the crew of the SS Pentallian try to escape from the damaged spaceship before it falls into a nearby star. Meanwhile, a mysterious entity roams the ship.

According to the BARB figures this episode was seen by 7.41 million viewers and was the third most popular non-soap-opera broadcast on British television in that week.

== Plot ==
The Tenth Doctor and Martha receive a distress signal from the SS Pentallian, a human spacecraft that is hurtling towards the star of the Torajii system. The Doctor pilots the TARDIS towards it to help, but after arriving they are separated from the TARDIS by the rising temperatures on the ship. The ship's engines have failed and they have only 42 minutes left before the ship plunges into the star. They need to reach the bridge controls but find themselves separated from them by thirty deadlock sealed doors that are each password encoded. Martha teams with Riley to work their way through the doors, having to answer pub quiz questions in order to open each door. The Doctor helps the engineering team try to repair the engines. Martha uses her modified mobile phone to call her mother Francine on present-day Earth to answer one of the questions. Francine asks questions about the Doctor that Martha ignores.

One of the crew, Captain McDonnell's husband, Korwin, has been infected with something that is causing his body temperature to rise to incredible levels. They attempt to sedate him while they continue the repairs, but the sedative does not work and Korwin escapes. He dons a welding helmet and starts killing crew members before infecting a man named Ashton. As Martha and Riley continue to work through the doors, they encounter Ashton and take shelter in a nearby escape pod. Ashton launches the pod, but McDonnell freezes him to death in a stasis chamber. The Doctor activates a magnetic control that recovers the pod. He gets infected by the star, and learns that the star is actually a living being and that the crew illegally drew the star's heart to use as fuel, and now the star is trying to recover its lost parts. Martha puts the Doctor into a stasis chamber to save him from the infection, but Korwin appears and disables the chamber. The Doctor insists that Martha leave him and warns the crew to dump the fuel, which should allow them to escape.

Martha relays the Doctor's message to the crew. McDonnell encounters Korwin and apologises to everyone before blowing Korwin and herself out of the airlock. The ship vents its fuel and the engines restart, allowing them to pull away from the star. After Martha calls Francine again, a woman who was monitoring Francine's phone confiscates it and leaves.

=== Cultural references ===
The title of the episode was chosen as a homage to the Answer to Life, the Universe, and Everything from The Hitchhiker's Guide to the Galaxy, written by Douglas Adams. Adams was a writer and script editor for Doctor Who in the late 1970s.

The Doctor asks the crew where their "Dunkirk spirit" is, referring to the evacuation and battle of Dunkirk.

A security question on "classical music" concerns Elvis Presley and The Beatles. The Doctor indirectly refers to the remix of "A Little Less Conversation", and name-drops the song "Here Comes the Sun".

A security question asks for the next number in a sequence. The sequence consists of consecutive happy prime numbers.

== Production ==
The SS Pentallian was originally going to have the name SS Icarus. This was changed after the producers learned of the film Sunshine, which also involved a spaceship named Icarus falling into the Sun.

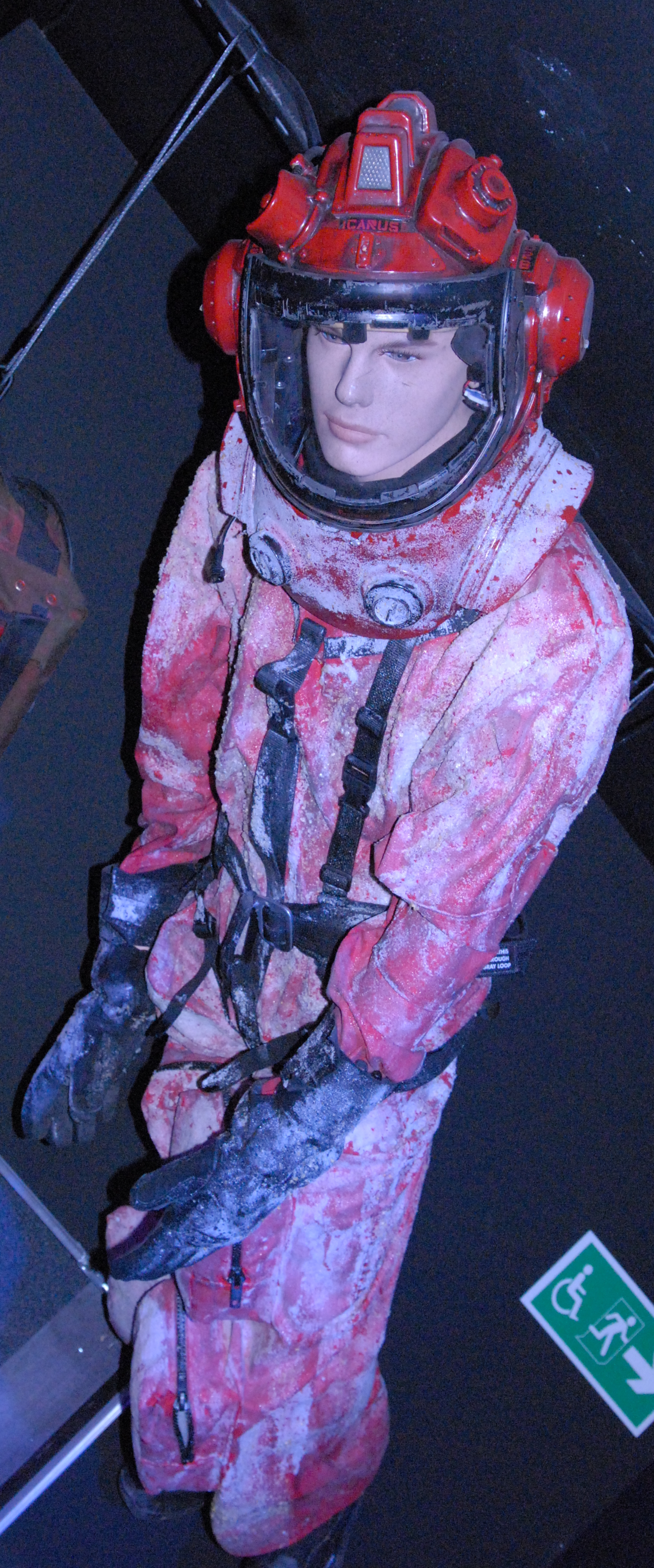
The spacesuit as it appears in the episode, including frost elements, as shown at the Doctor Who Experience.

Several elements of the episode had been reused from previous episodes. The stasis chamber is adapted from the prop used as the MRI scanner in "Smith and Jones", according to associate production designer James North. Likewise, the spacesuit the Doctor wears was previously seen in "The Impossible Planet" and "The Satan Pit" and has since been repainted, according to producer Phil Collinson in the online audio commentary for "42".

On 12 May 2007, the BBC website published a text-based "exclusive prologue" to the episode. Written by Joseph Lidster, it details the reactions of one of the characters, Erina Lissak, a recent addition to the crew of the Pentallian, as the ship's engines stop, a countdown to impact begins, and she unexpectedly meets the Doctor and Martha.

Doctor Who Magazine reported in the preview for this episode that the title "42" was chosen for the fact the episode is set in approximate real time. Producer Phil Collinson added in an episode commentary that the name was a reference to the real-time US television series 24. Writer Chibnall acknowledged that the title also references the work of Douglas Adams, which features the number 42, and said that "it's a playful title".

Chibnall goes on to compare the episode itself to "The Satan Pit", at least from a visual standpoint.

=== Cast notes ===
William Ash later played Sam in the Sixth Doctor audio drama The Condemned.

Vinette Robinson later played Rosa Parks in the Thirteenth Doctor episode "Rosa" co-written by Chibnall, who by this time had become showrunner.

== Broadcast ==
Originally planned for broadcast on 12 May 2007, this episode was postponed by the BBC due to their coverage of the final of Eurovision Song Contest 2007. This in turn pushed the rest of the series back a week.
