= Daleks in Manhattan =

182a – "Daleks in Manhattan"
- Doctor Who episode

Cast
- Doctor: David Tennant – Tenth Doctor
- Companion: Freema Agyeman – Martha Jones
- Others: Miranda Raison – Tallulah; Ryan Carnes – Laszlo; Hugh Quarshie – Solomon; Andrew Garfield – Frank; Eric Loren – Mr Diagoras; Flik Swan – Myrna; Alexis Caley – Lois; Earl Perkins – Man #1; Peter Brooke – Man #2; Ian Porter – Foreman; Joe Montana – Worker #1; Stewart Alexander – Worker #2; Mel Taylor – Dock Worker; Barnaby Edwards, Nicholas Pegg, Anthony Spargo, David Hankinson – Dalek Operators; Nicholas Briggs – Dalek Voices; Paul Kasey – Hero Pig (Note: Hero Pig, or Hero Pig Man in part 2, played by Paul Kasey is mentioned in the credits. This is not a reference to a specific character but to the pig who was given the most to do, 'Hero' being the term for a prop or costume with the most detail and therefore most suitable for closeups.)

Production
- Directed by: James Strong
- Written by: Helen Raynor
- Produced by: Phil Collinson
- Executive producers: Russell T Davies; Julie Gardner
- Music by: Murray Gold
- Production code: 3.4
- Series: Series 3
- Running time: 1st of 2-part story, 45 minutes
- First broadcast: 21 April 2007

Chronology
← Preceded by "Gridlock"	Followed by → "Evolution of the Daleks"

"Daleks in Manhattan" is the fourth episode of the third series of British science fiction television series Doctor Who, which was first broadcast on BBC One on 21 April 2007. It is part one of a two-part story. Its concluding part, "Evolution of the Daleks", was broadcast on 28 April.

The episode is set in New York City in 1930. In the episode, an order of Daleks called the Cult of Skaro use half-human, half-pig slaves to kidnap homeless humans for use in their experiments.

According to the BARB figures this episode was seen by 6.69 million viewers and was the eighteenth most popular broadcast on British television in that week.

== Plot ==
The Tenth Doctor and Martha arrive in New York City in November of 1930 during the Great Depression, landing the TARDIS at Liberty Island. They find a newspaper article about recent disappearances and travel to Hooverville, a tent city in Central Park. There they meet Solomon, the leader, who explains more about the disappearances. A wealthy businessman named Mr Diagoras appears in Hooverville to recruit workers for sewer construction. The Doctor, Martha, Solomon, and a young man named Frank sign up. They are taken to the sewer and instructed to clear a collapsed tunnel. As they explore the tunnels the Doctor finds a mass of alien organic matter that he takes with him to analyse later. The group soon runs into a group of Pig Slaves and are forced to flee but Frank is captured by the creatures.

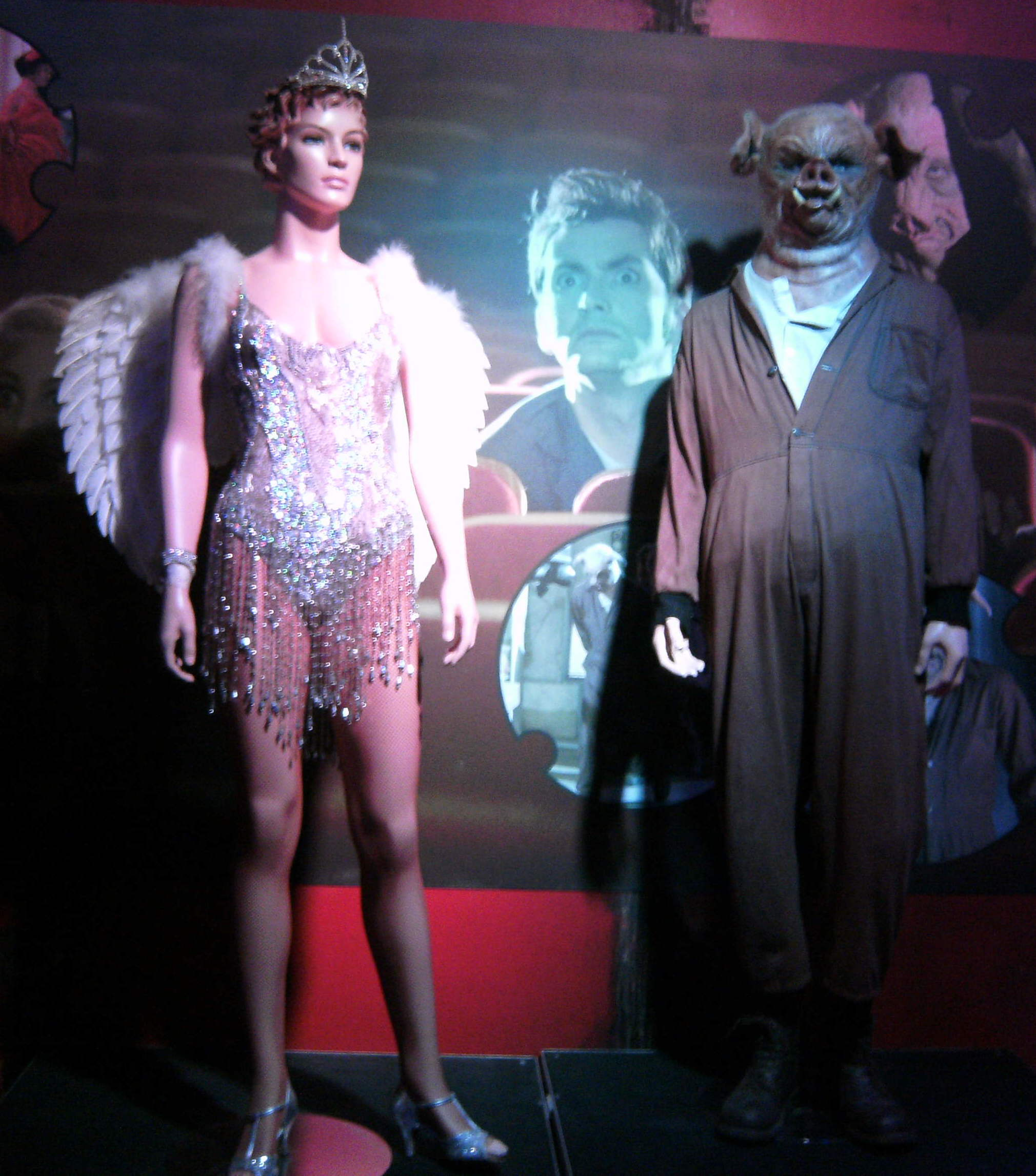
The showgirl costume and Pig Slaves as shown at the Doctor Who Experience.

The Doctor, Martha, and Solomon use a nearby ladder to escape and find themselves in a theatre where they meet Tallulah, a showgirl whose boyfriend Laszlo is one of the people who have disappeared. The Doctor uses equipment in the theatre to create a matter analyser while Martha helps to console Tallulah. When Tallulah goes on stage for her show, Martha spots a Pig Slave across the stage. Martha gives chase into the sewers, where she is captured by more Pig Slaves. The Doctor and Tallulah follow and find the Pig Slave Martha was chasing, whom they determine to be Laszlo. They also encounter a Dalek, confirming the Doctor's analysis that shows the organic matter being from the planet Skaro. The three follow the Dalek and learn from Laszlo that the Daleks are causing the disappearances, rounding up humans to either make into Pig Slaves or use for an unspecified experiment.

Tallulah tries to return to the theatre, but loses her way while the Doctor and Laszlo sneak into the incomplete Empire State Building and locate Martha and Frank. The group encounters the Cult of Skaro, and the Doctor stays in the background while Martha asks the Daleks what they are planning to do. The Daleks reveal that they are attempting to merge the Dalek and human races. Dalek Sec conducts the first experiment on himself, fusing himself to the body of Mr Diagoras and becoming the first Dalek-human hybrid.

=== Cultural references ===
- Tallulah is based on Jodie Foster's character, also named Tallulah, in Bugsy Malone.
- The Island of Doctor Moreau, Frankenstein and The Phantom of the Opera were amongst the horror novels and films that served as inspiration for this story.

== Production ==
Steven Moffat was initially assigned to the two-parter but pulled out from the episodes, offering to write the series' "Doctor-lite" episode "Blink" instead to make up for the inconvenience to the production team. "Daleks in Manhattan"/"Evolution of the Daleks" was given to Helen Raynor, who is the first woman to write a televised Dalek story and the first woman to write a story for the revived series.

Some filming for this story was done in New York City for plates of the city, including images of Central Park, the Empire State Building, and the Statue of Liberty. However, on the online episode commentary for "Gridlock", David Tennant, when asked if he filmed in New York, replied, "I didn't, everybody else did!" All of the scenes with Martha and the Doctor in front of the Statue of Liberty were actually filmed in Wales. The production team found a wall that matched the base of the statue. The Mill also used the shoot for elements of the Majestic Theatre. This episode includes the first location filming outside of the United Kingdom since Doctor Who's return in 2005. Several original Doctor Who stories included location filming outside of the UK: City of Death (1979) included filming in Paris, Arc of Infinity (1983) included filming in Amsterdam, Planet of Fire (1984) included filming in Lanzarote, and The Two Doctors (1985) included filming in and near Seville. Also, the entirety of the 1996 Doctor Who TV movie was filmed in Vancouver, apart from some stock footage of San Francisco and world capitals.

Scenes set at the Hooverville shanty town were filmed at Bute Park, Cardiff from 9–11 and 13–14 November 2006. The dance scene was rehearsed in London but shot in the Parc and Dare Hall, in Treorchy, South Wales on 15 November.

A shot supposedly in the Hooverville shows the Empire State Building, incomplete, looming over trees in the background. In fact the building is about 2 km (1.2 mi) from Central Park, much further than might be inferred from the shot. Similarly the view of the southern tip of Manhattan from Liberty Island is exaggerated to make the building seem part of southern Manhattan and close to Liberty Island. The true distance is about 8 km (5.0 mi) from the island to the building. The closest point on Manhattan is 2.6 km (1.6 mi) from the island.

The presence of the Daleks in this story was reported by the News of the World on 12 November 2006 and confirmed by the BBC in late December. The Dalek Sec hybrid was featured on the cover of Radio Times for the week "Daleks in Manhattan" aired, leading some to call it a spoiler. An interview with David Tennant in TV Times indicated there would also be 'Art Deco Daleks'. However, they did not appear in either this episode or the second part, "Evolution of the Daleks".

=== Cast notes ===
- Joe Montana, who appears as "Worker #1", had previously played the Commander in the Ninth Doctor episode "Dalek".
- Miranda Raison has appeared in several Doctor Who audio plays with Big Finish Productions, most often in a recurring role as the Sixth Doctor's companion Constance Clarke.

== Broadcast and reception ==
When final ratings were calculated, the episode had been watched by 6.69 million viewers. This episode along with "Evolution of the Daleks", "The Lazarus Experiment", and "42" was released as a DVD with no special features.

Mark Wright of The Stage was positive towards the episode, praising the exploration of the setting, the Daleks, Tennant, and the supporting cast. Noting how the two-part structure allowed it to take its time, he concluded that the "script goes to the top of the pile as amongst the best modern Doctor Who has to offer." SFX reviewer Richard Edwards was generally positive towards the two-parter, though he noted the cliffhanger of "Daleks in Manhattan" was hurt by the reveal of Dalek Sec's hybrid form in Radio Times. IGN's Travis Fickett was less positive, giving the episode a score of 6.5 out of 10. He found the Daleks to come off "goofy and almost comic relief" and, unlike Wright, felt that Tallulah was an offensive stereotype, as well as the other Americans as annoying stock characters. Furthermore, despite good acting from Tennant and Agyeman and some "nice images", Fickett criticised the premise for not making much sense, with its message "muddled".
