= The Runaway Bride (Doctor Who) =

Episode of Doctor Who

178 – "The Runaway Bride"
- Doctor Who episode

Cast
- Doctor: David Tennant – Tenth Doctor
- Companion: Catherine Tate – Donna Noble
- Others: Sarah Parish – Empress; Don Gilet – Lance Bennett; Howard Attfield – Geoff Noble; Jacqueline King – Sylvia Noble; Trevor Georges – Vicar; Rhodri Meilir – Rhodri; Krystal Archer – Nerys; Zafirah Boateng – Little Girl; Paul Kasey – Robot Santa

Production
- Directed by: Euros Lyn
- Written by: Russell T Davies
- Produced by: Phil Collinson
- Executive producers: Russell T Davies; Julie Gardner
- Music by: Murray Gold
- Production code: 3.X
- Running time: 60 minutes
- First broadcast: 25 December 2006

Chronology
← Preceded by "Doomsday"	Followed by → "Smith and Jones"

"The Runaway Bride" is a special episode of the long-running British science fiction television programme Doctor Who, starring David Tennant as the Tenth Doctor. It was produced as the Doctor Who Christmas special for 2006, broadcast on 25 December, and aired between the second and third series of the relaunched show.

In the episode, set in London, the alien Racnoss Empress (Sarah Parish) and the human resources head Lance (Don Gilet) attempt to use Lance's fiancée, the secretary Donna Noble (Catherine Tate), as a "key" to awaken the Racnoss children hibernating at the centre of the Earth by gradually and secretly poisoning Donna with an alien particle the Racnoss use as an energy source.

== Plot ==
The Tenth Doctor is shocked when Donna Noble, in a wedding dress, appears within the TARDIS while in flight. The Doctor returns Donna to her wedding. At the reception, the Doctor determines that Donna must have absorbed a great number of huon particles, which drew her to the TARDIS. The reception is attacked by robots dressed as Santa Claus. The Doctor uses the sound system to destroy the Santas, and discovers something is controlling them remotely from space.

Learning that Donna and her fiancé Lance work for a security firm owned by the Torchwood Institute, the Doctor asks Lance to take them there. Underneath the building, the Doctor finds a long tunnel under the Thames Barrier, and a secret laboratory producing huon particles, along with a pit that leads to the centre of the Earth. Their presence brings forth the spider-like Empress of the Racnoss, a race that was born hungry and ate entire worlds. The Empress, who had been in hibernation at the edge of the universe, awoke and took over the business after Torchwood was destroyed. (Note: Torchwood was destroyed in the 2006 episode "Doomsday".) Lance reveals he was working for the Empress and purposely fed huon particles to Donna to help free the Empress' children. Donna and the Doctor escape. The Empress uses Lance as a substitute, force-feeding him huon particles and then throwing him into the pit.

The Doctor takes Donna to his TARDIS and travels back billions of years to discover that an inert Racnoss ship became the core of the Earth as the planet formed around it; the Empress is now trying to wake her children aboard that ship with the huon particles. The Doctor and Donna return to the present as other Racnoss start emerging from the pit. The Empress attacks Earth with a ship resembling a Christmas star. The Doctor attempts to offer a peaceful solution but the Empress refuses. The Doctor then remotely detonates explosive baubles used by the Santas at the walls of the base, flooding the pit with water from the Thames. The Doctor is prepared to die, but Donna urges him to escape with her, just as the Empress teleports to her ship to try to escape. However, the ship has run out of huon energy and is promptly destroyed by military forces. The Doctor asks Donna to travel with him. She declines, but suggests he needs a companion to keep his temperament in check.

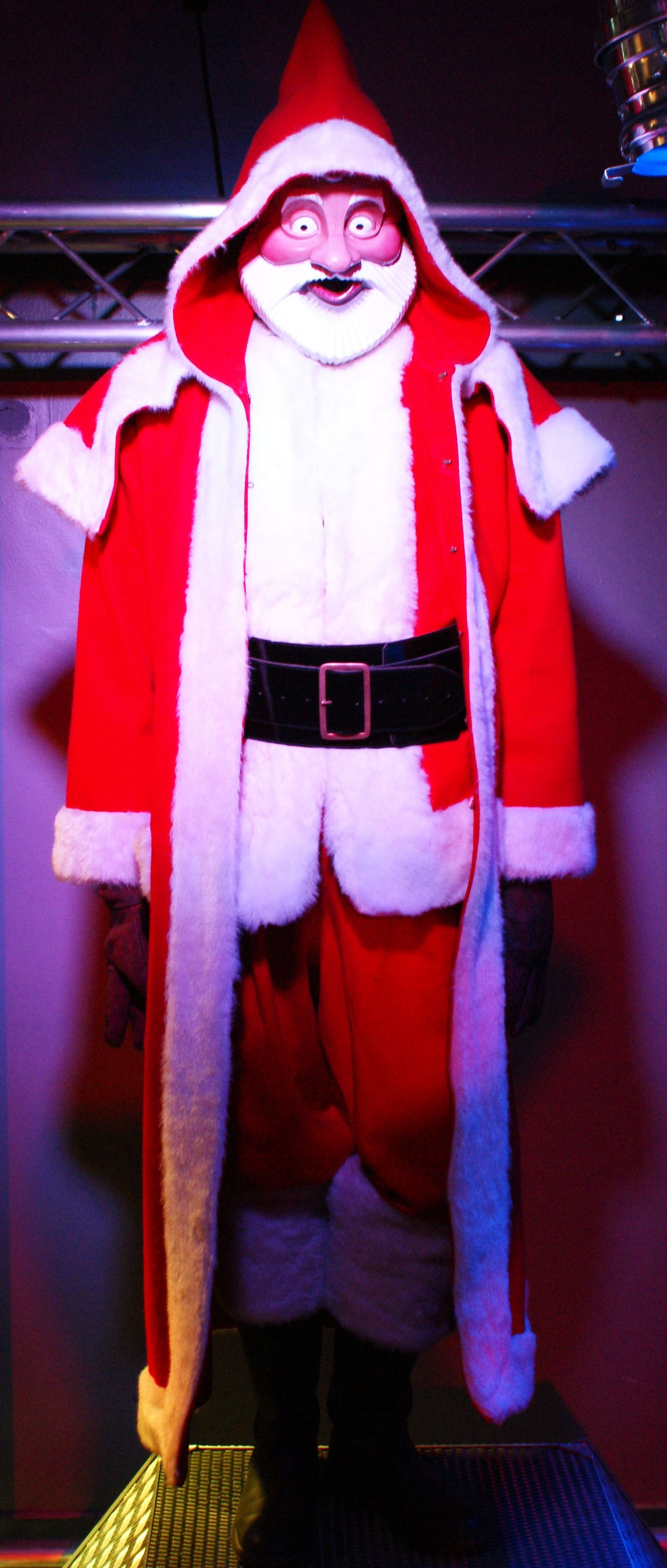
The redesigned Robotic Santa Clauses, as shown at the Doctor Who Experience

== Production ==
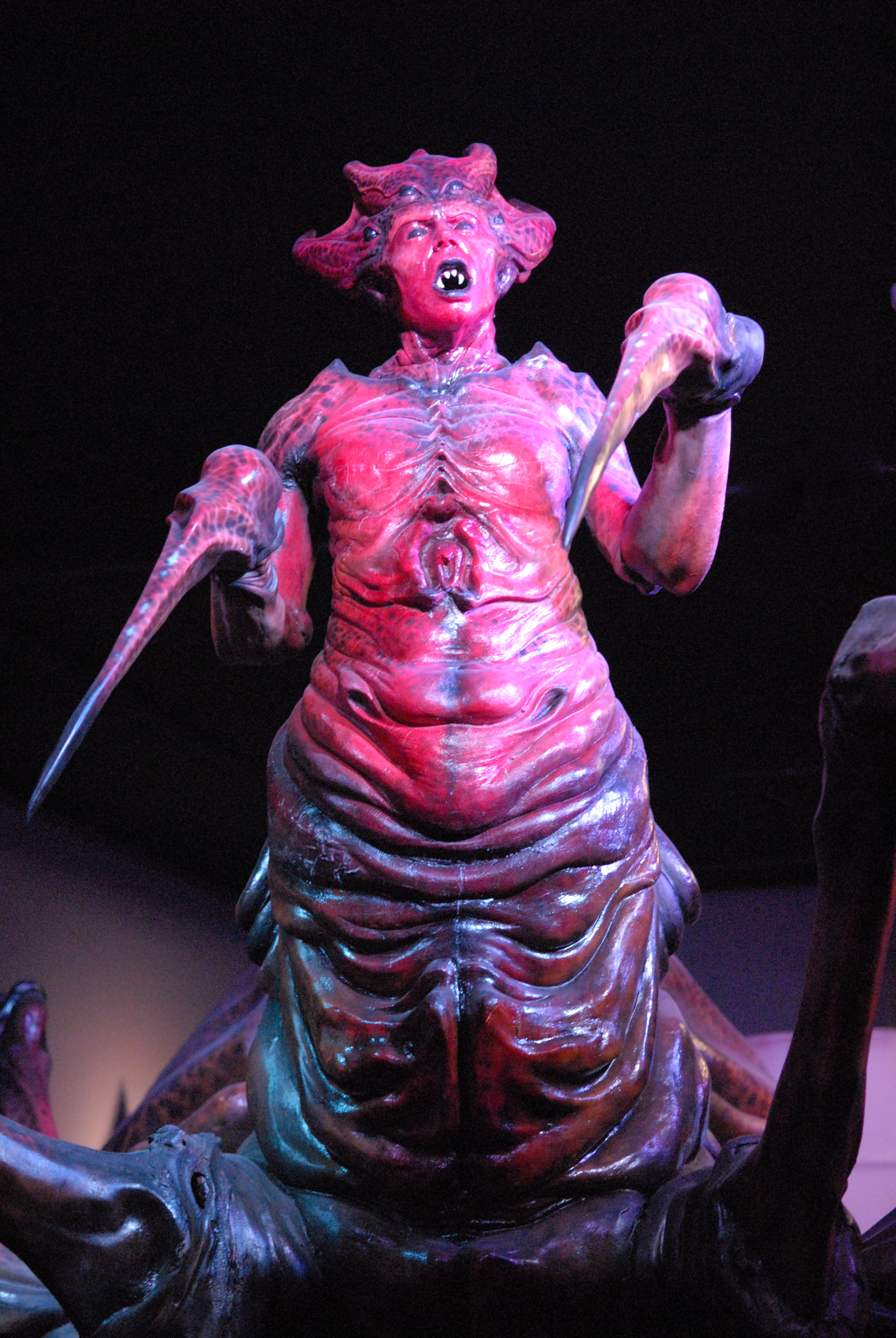
Racnoss prop, as displayed at the Doctor Who Experience

Russell T Davies had the idea for this episode from the very beginning of his association with the programme, and he planned to air it in Series Two. With the public announcement of two Christmas specials and the private knowledge of Billie Piper leaving at the end of Series Two, Davies decided to elevate this story to the Christmas special, not introducing the new companion immediately, and filling the slot with "Tooth and Claw".

The end of "Doomsday" is featured as part of the pre-title sequence, although the scene was actually refilmed. In his online podcast commentary for the episode, David Tennant explained that this was due to a change in lighting supervisors, and the one hired for this episode liked to light the TARDIS interior differently; the scene therefore had to be refilmed in order to match. The Doctor Who logo in the opening credits has been slightly redesigned from the previous one, with more background detail and flare on the "lozenge" that the words "Doctor Who" sit on.

For legal reasons, the production team made obviously fake banknotes for the scene where money comes flying out of a cashpoint. The £10 notes feature the Doctor's face and the phrases "I promise to pay the bearer on demand the sum of ten satsumas" and "No second chances — I'm that sort of a man". The text is a reference to the Doctor's actions and dialogue near the end of "The Christmas Invasion". There were also £20 notes featuring producer Phil Collinson. These had the phrase "There's no point being grown up if you can't be a little childish sometimes" printed on them, a line originally spoken by the Fourth Doctor (Tom Baker) in Robot (though without the modifier "a little"). All notes and the cash machine were labelled "London Credit Bank".

Due to her extremely busy schedule, Catherine Tate was unable to be present for the script readthrough. As a favour, her part was read by Sophia Myles, who played Madame de Pompadour in the 2006 series episode "The Girl in the Fireplace". This was the first Doctor Who episode to be shot at the new dedicated Upper Boat studios in Pontypridd; the TARDIS set had previously been housed in former warehouse space in Newport. Although the episode was set during Christmas, filming took place in July, where temperatures reached 30C in Cardiff during filming. Night filming of scenes involving gunfire, explosions and a tank, as well as those on "Oxford Street", were filmed on St. Mary Street outside Howell's Department Store in Cardiff City Centre; Cardiff Castle is visible behind the tank in some shots.

In a podcast commentary for the episode, David Tennant and executive producer Julie Gardner discussed a sequence that was cut from the broadcast. As broadcast, after Donna finds a piece of Rose's clothing and challenges the Doctor about it, he snatches it from her and sets a course for the TARDIS. As originally filmed, the Doctor first opens the TARDIS doors and throws the garment into space. Gardner said it was cut as it was too melodramatic.

The TARDIS chase scene down the A4232 Grangetown Link Road was shown at a Children in Need concert, which featured a live orchestra performing many of the music themes from Doctor Who, including the Dalek music and Rose's theme. The clip was leaked online shortly after the event and the concert and clip were shown earlier before the episode officially aired on Christmas Day on a Doctor Who Confidential special at 1:00 p.m.

=== Cast notes ===
Sarah Parish has co-starred with David Tennant in two other BBC One dramas: Blackpool (2004) and Recovery (2007). Catherine Tate co-starred with Tennant in a sketch for Comic Relief (2007) which made several Doctor Who references.

Catherine Tate returned in series 4, reprising her role as Donna Noble as a full-time companion. Jacqueline King and Howard Attfield are introduced in this episode, and were both due to return in "Partners In Crime", the first episode of the 2008 season. Jacqueline King did return but Howard Attfield died shortly after completing the shoot, and his scenes were reshot with Bernard Cribbins as Donna's grandfather. King had previously appeared in the Doctor Who Unbound audio drama Deadline.

=== Music ===
"Merry Xmas Everybody" by Slade appears again, as in the previous year's "The Christmas Invasion".

Also as with "The Christmas Invasion" (which contained the tune "Song for Ten"), composer Murray Gold wrote an original song for this special, called "Love Don't Roam". The song was performed by Neil Hannon, frontman of the Divine Comedy (who had, coincidentally, appeared in a sketch of The Catherine Tate Show earlier in the year). The song was previewed at the Doctor Who: A Celebration concert on 19 November 2006 at the Wales Millennium Centre in Cardiff, where it was sung by Gary Williams; the studio version featuring Hannon is on the soundtrack album released on 11 December 2006.

== Broadcast and reception ==
This was the first Doctor Who story to be broadcast with in-vision British Sign Language interpretation, in a UK repeat on 30 December 2006. The final official ratings for "The Runaway Bride" gave it an audience of 9.35 million viewers, making it the tenth most-watched programme on British television during Christmas week.

"The Runaway Bride" was released as an individual episode, along with the Doctor Who Confidential special episode "Music and Monsters", on 2 April 2007 as a basic DVD with no additional special features.

Steve O'Brien of SFX gave "The Runaway Bride" four out of five stars, noting that it was different from anything Doctor Who had done, but the "sillier" tone worked for Christmas Day. He also praised Tennant and Tate. IGN's Travis Fickett gave the episode a score of 7.2 out of 10, feeling that Donna had improved from her short appearance at the end of "Doomsday". Fickett was also positive about the way Rose was not ignored. Dek Hogan of Digital Spy wrote that the episode "lacked the energy and excitement of last year's effort", particularly criticising the Empress. In 2012, SFX listed "The Runaway Bride" as a bad example of a sci-fi Christmas episode, noting that it was "a decent episode in many respects" but had the disadvantage of being filmed in the summer.

=== Home video release ===
The 'vanilla' DVD release of the episode, along with the Doctor Who Confidential episode "Music and Monsters", was released 2 April 2007 in Region 2 and 4 July 2007 in Region 4. The episode is also included in The Complete Third Series DVD boxset, originally released 5 November 2007 in Region 2 and 6 November 2007 in Region 1, as well as its subsequent Blu-ray boxset released 5 November 2013 in Region 1 and 15 August 2015 in Region 2 and in later DVD and Blu-ray boxset re-releases. Along with "Doomsday", "The Runaway Bride" is also featured on the DVD included with the fourteenth issue of the Doctor Who DVD Files magazine released 15 July 2009 and in the Region 1-exclusive Doctor Who: Series 3, Part 1 DVD set released 10 June 2014.

Along with the other Christmas specials between "The Christmas Invasion" and "Last Christmas", "The Runaway Bride" was released in a boxset titled Doctor Who – The 10 Christmas Specials on 19 October 2015.

In November 2020, it was released as part of the Time Lord Victorious: Road to the Dark Times Blu-ray set, along with Planet of the Daleks, Genesis of the Daleks, The Deadly Assassin, State of Decay, The Curse of Fenric and The Waters of Mars.
