= The Lazarus Experiment =

Episode of Doctor Who

183 – "The Lazarus Experiment"
- Doctor Who episode

Cast
- Doctor: David Tennant – Tenth Doctor
- Companion: Freema Agyeman – Martha Jones
- Others: Gugu Mbatha-Raw – Tish Jones; Reggie Yates – Leo Jones; Adjoa Andoh – Francine Jones; Mark Gatiss – Lazarus; Thelma Barlow – Lady Thaw; Lucy O'Connell – Olive Woman; Bertie Carvel – Mysterious Man

Production
- Directed by: Richard Clark
- Written by: Stephen Greenhorn
- Produced by: Phil Collinson
- Executive producer(s): Russell T Davies; Julie Gardner
- Music by: Murray Gold
- Production code: 3.6
- Series: Series 3
- Running time: 45 minutes
- First broadcast: 5 May 2007

Chronology
← Preceded by "Evolution of the Daleks"	Followed by → "42"

"The Lazarus Experiment" is the sixth episode of the third series of the revived British science fiction television series Doctor Who. It was broadcast on BBC One on 5 May 2007 and stars David Tennant as the Tenth Doctor and Freema Agyeman as Martha Jones.

In the episode, Professor Richard Lazarus (Mark Gatiss) demonstrates an experiment at his laboratory near Southwark Cathedral in Southwark where he renews himself into a younger-looking man. The effects on Lazarus' DNA causes him to sporadically transform into a giant creature that sucks the life force from other victims.

According to the BARB figures this episode was seen by 7.19 million viewers and was the twelfth most popular broadcast on British television in that week. Executive producer Russell T Davies has stated that he directed writer Stephen Greenhorn to base this episode on the typical Marvel Comics plotline: "a good old mad scientist, with an experiment gone wrong, and an outrageous supervillain on the loose."

== Plot ==
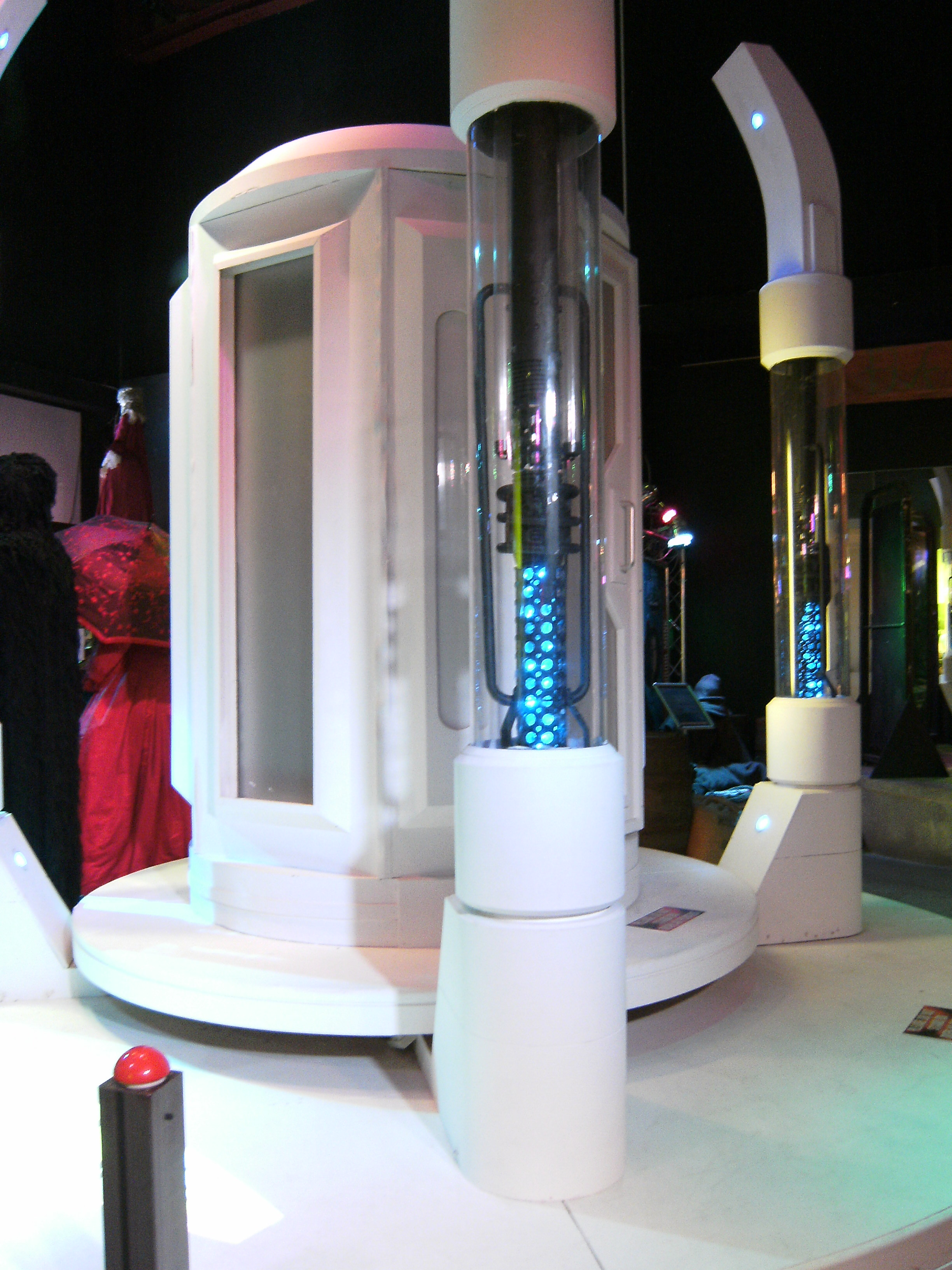
The machine at Lazarus Labs as shown at the Doctor Who Experience.

In present-day London, a 76-year-old man named Professor Richard Lazarus announces on television that he will demonstrate a device that will change what it means to be human. Intrigued by this statement, the Tenth Doctor joins Martha to go to the launch party at Lazarus Laboratories, where they meet up with Martha's sister Tish, who works there. Lazarus steps inside a capsule, and emerges as a much younger man. Using a sample of Lazarus' DNA, the Doctor and Martha find that Lazarus had successfully managed to instruct his genes to rejuvenate with sound waves, but also activated something in his DNA, which is trying to change him into something else.

Meanwhile, Lazarus returns to his office with his partner, the elderly Lady Thaw. She insists that she be the next to use the machine so they can be young together, but he refuses. She threatens to have Mr. Saxon pull their funding, but Lazarus transforms and kills Lady Thaw. The Doctor and Martha discover Lady Thaw's body and deduce that Lazarus must drain life energy to keep his DNA stable. Lazarus attacks the Doctor and Martha, in his alternate form as a giant skeletal scorpion-like being, and they hide in his machine. The Doctor explains that Lazarus' transformation is the result of an evolutionary throwback locked away in dormant genes that the machine accidentally unlocked. Lazarus activates his machine, but the Doctor sets the capsule to reflect energy rather than receive it, and Lazarus is blasted away.

Lazarus' body is taken away in an ambulance. Martha's mother Francine becomes doubtful about Martha's connection with the Doctor after being informed by Harold Saxon that the Doctor is dangerous. The Doctor hears the ambulance crash and finds that the drivers have been drained of life. The Doctor, Martha and Tish chase Lazarus to the nearby Southwark Cathedral, where Lazarus sought sanctuary during the Blitz. Martha and Tish lure Lazarus to the top of the Cathedral's bell tower, and the Doctor manipulates the church's pipe organ to produce the maximum volume it can. The vibrations caused by the organ interfere with Lazarus' manipulated DNA and he falls to his death.

The Doctor invites Martha to come along for one more trip. She refuses, saying she doesn't want to travel with him as just a passenger. The Doctor agrees that she is more than that to him, and they leave together in the TARDIS.

=== Cultural references ===
==== Film and television ====
- The preview of the story in the Radio Times magazine claimed that the episode's conclusion, wherein a monster, mutated from a man, dies in a large London church, is a reference to that of the 1953 science fiction serial The Quatermass Experiment. David Tennant and Mark Gatiss appeared in the 2005 live remake of The Quatermass Experiment. These similarities were also noted by Alan Barnes in a 2017 feature on the story in Doctor Who Magazine. Barnes also suggested that the title of the story was influenced by that of The Quatermass Experiment.
- Martha likens the Doctor's appearance when wearing a dinner jacket to James Bond; the Doctor appears skeptical but flattered. The commentary track mentions the Doctor's loosening of his bow-tie as a "Daniel Craig moment".

== Production ==
Gatiss' appearance has made him one of a select few to have both written for and acted in the show. Gatiss began his writing career on the New Adventures Doctor Who novels, and acted in material for a BBC Doctor Who evening before the new series was commissioned. Others with similar credits include Victor Pemberton and Glyn Jones.

Whilst the exterior shots of Southwark Cathedral are the cathedral itself (or a matte image edited onto the Cardiff exterior sets), the interiors were filmed in Wells Cathedral (apart from the tower as seen from the crossing and the interior of the tower, which is a set). A model of Southwark Cathedral also appears in Lazarus's office, along with one of Michelangelo's David. The interiors of Professor Lazarus's institute were shot in Cardiff Museum, the Welsh Parliament's Senedd building, and St William House, Cardiff. The latter also served as a location for the pilot episode of The Sarah Jane Adventures, and the Torchwood episode "Random Shoes".

A scene cut from the episode, but included as an extra with the DVD release, reveals that the Doctor participated in the writing of the United States Declaration of Independence and in fact carries a copy of the first draft folded up in the pocket of his dinner jacket. An outtake of this scene is featured on the DVD as well, in which the Doctor has completely unfolded the document, only for Tennant to realise that he and Agyeman have run out of track.

== Broadcast ==
The following episode, "42", was delayed by one week to make way for the BBC's broadcasting of the Eurovision Song Contest. The BBC Doctor Who web page announced in advance that 'something special' would be appended to the end of the original broadcast of this episode. This proved to be an extended teaser for the remaining episodes of the series, taking the place of the usual "Next time..." teaser trail and headed instead "Coming up...". This was also made available immediately after transmission on the BBC's Doctor Who website. The extended trailer featured many short clips from upcoming stories: eyeless animated scarecrows and the titular Family of Blood, the return of Captain Jack Harkness, Sir Derek Jacobi in character, Michelle Collins likewise and, briefly, John Simm as the mysterious Mr. Saxon seen smiling for press cameras before the Houses of Parliament and in the Cabinet Room at No. 10 wearing an oxygen mask, sinisterly tapping out the heavy rhythm of the incidental music and surrounded by inert bodies. At the very end, a further caption ahead of the credits of "The Lazarus Experiment" revealed that "Doctor Who will return in two weeks". The "normal" trailer for "42" was then made available on the BBC Doctor Who website and was used on the DVDs instead of the special trailer, and is used in most repeats of the episode.
