= Richard Clark (director) =

British television director

Richard Clark is a British television director.

He is the winner of the 2011 Ray Bradbury Award for Outstanding Dramatic Presentation (with Neil Gaiman) for directing the Doctor Who episode "The Doctor's Wife".

== Selected filmography ==
- My Dead Buddy (1997)
- Life on Mars
  - 2.3 (2007)
  - 2.4 (2007)
- Doctor Who
  - "Gridlock" (2007)
  - "The Lazarus Experiment" (2007)
  - "The Doctor's Wife" (2011)
  - "Night Terrors"(2011)
- The Musketeers
  - "The Good Soldier" (2014)
  - "A Rebellious Woman" (2014)
- Outlander (2014-2016)
