= Smith and Jones (Doctor Who) =

179 – "Smith and Jones"
- Doctor Who episode

Cast
- Doctor: David Tennant – Tenth Doctor
- Companion: Freema Agyeman – Martha Jones
- Others: Anne Reid – Florence Finnegan; Roy Marsden – Mr Stoker; Adjoa Andoh – Francine Jones; Gugu Mbatha-Raw – Tish Jones; Reggie Yates – Leo Jones; Trevor Laird – Clive Jones; Kimmi Richards – Annalise; Ben Righton – Oliver Morgenstern; Vineeta Rishi – Julia Swales; Paul Kasey – Judoon Leader; Nicholas Briggs – Judoon Voices

Production
- Directed by: Charles Palmer
- Written by: Russell T Davies
- Produced by: Phil Collinson
- Executive producers: Russell T Davies; Julie Gardner
- Music by: Murray Gold
- Production code: 3.1
- Series: Series 3
- Running time: 45 minutes
- First broadcast: 31 March 2007

Chronology
← Preceded by "The Runaway Bride"	Followed by → "The Shakespeare Code"

"Smith and Jones" is the first episode of the third series of the British science fiction television series Doctor Who. It was first broadcast on BBC One on 31 March 2007. It sees the debut of Freema Agyeman as medical student Martha Jones. Agyeman had previously appeared as Martha's cousin Adeola in the 2006 episode "Army of Ghosts". The episode also introduced Martha's family, her mother Francine (played by Adjoa Andoh), father Clive (Trevor Laird), sister Tish (Gugu Mbatha-Raw), and brother Leo (Reggie Yates).

The episode sees alien police-for-hire called the Judoon transporting a London hospital to the Moon to hunt down a shapeshifting alien fugitive called "Florence Finnegan" (Anne Reid), who is posing as a human patient inside.

The episode was shot mainly in August 2006, with Singleton Hospital and the University of Glamorgan doubling as the fictional Royal Hope Hospital. According to the Broadcasters' Audience Research Board figures, it was seen by 8.7 million viewers and was the ninth most popular broadcast on British television in that week. It garnered an Appreciation Index of 88.

== Plot ==
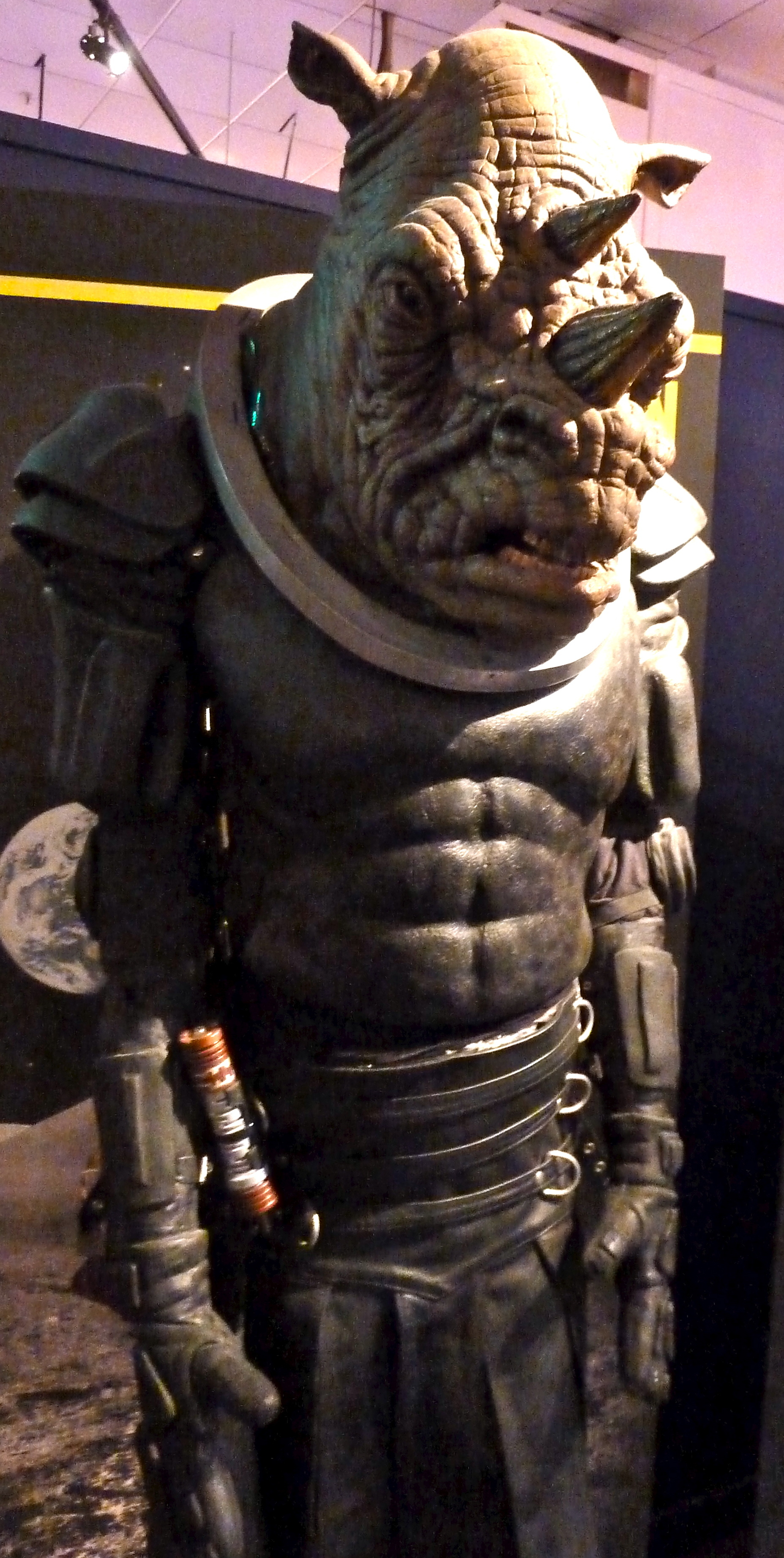
The Judoon, as they appear at the Doctor Who Experience

A London hospital along with its staff and patients is transported to the Moon. Three spaceships land nearby, and the hospital is invaded by the Judoon, an intergalactic police force for hire who are searching for a Plasmavore, an alien with the ability to appear as the species whose blood it consumes by internally changing its shape. The Judoon begin scanning everyone in the hospital, cataloguing the humans whilst attempting to find the non-human criminal. The Tenth Doctor, posing as a human patient to investigate the hospital, talks to medical student Martha Jones, revealing that he is an alien as well. The two go down to the lobby to find out what the Judoon are doing. An older lady named Florence Finnegan reveals that she is the Plasmavore. She drains Mr Stoker, the head of the hospital, and consequently registers as human when the Judoon scan her. The Doctor knows if he is scanned he will register as non-human, so he and Martha quietly avoid the Judoon, who will also likely execute all people within the hospital on grounds of harbouring a fugitive if they discover a non-human in the building. As the oxygen level in the hospital drops, people begin to collapse.

The Doctor finds Florence in a magnetic resonance imaging (MRI) room, where she is modifying the scanner to make it destroy all life on the Moon and the half of the Earth currently facing it. The Doctor pretends to be a confused human and Florence drinks his blood until he collapses. Martha enters and grabs a Judoon scanner and exposes Florence as non-human. Confirming Florence is the fugitive they seek, the Judoon execute her for the murder of an alien princess and return to their ships. Martha uses cardiopulmonary resuscitation on the Doctor's two hearts to revive him. The Doctor disables the modified MRI and the Judoon finally shift the hospital back to Earth seconds before everyone perishes from oxygen deprivation.

That evening, after a birthday party for Martha's brother Leo ends in a fight, the Doctor invites Martha to travel with him. Martha hesitates until the Doctor demonstrates that he can travel in time as well. Martha steps into the TARDIS, and the Doctor tells her that she is only going on one trip with him.

=== Continuity ===
Martha refers to the spaceship crashing into Big Ben in "Aliens of London", the events of "The Christmas Invasion" or "The Runaway Bride", and the Battle of Canary Wharf against the Cybermen from "Army of Ghosts". She also recalls the loss of her cousin Adeola who "worked at Canary Wharf" and disappeared, a reference to the "Army of Ghosts" character played by the same actress.

The Doctor voices his approval of the hospital shop, a reference to "New Earth", when he stated that he likes "little shops". Martha asks the Doctor if he has a brother and he replies, "Not any more". A brother to the Doctor was previously mentioned in the spin-off New Adventure novel Tears of the Oracle by Justin Richards, which was edited by Simon Winstone, script editor for this episode. The brother's name, or at least the name he used, was Irving Braxiatel. The Doctor uses his alias "John Smith", which was given to him by Jamie McCrimmon in the serial The Wheel in Space (1968).

== Production ==
This is the first episode not to have a pre-credits sequence since the Ninth Doctor episode "Rose" (another series opener, also introducing a new companion). The next series opener, "Partners in Crime", would also have no pre-credits sequence.

=== Filming ===
Filming took place mainly in August 2006, with additional work done between September and November of that year. The hospital was filmed in several places over August - the School of Sciences at the University of Glamorgan (Note: School of Sciences (Hospital): 51°35′38″N 3°19′18″W) was used, as well as parts of Singleton Hospital in Swansea, (Note: Singleton Hospital (Hospital): 51°36′34″N 3°59′7″W) and Usk Valley Business Park. (Note: Usk Valley Business Park (Hospital):51°42′33″N 3°0′20″W) The verandah and the staff kitchen were shot in the Doctor Who production team's studios at Upper Boat, Trefforest. (Note: Upper Boat Studios: 51°34′32″N 3°18′2″W)

The alley at the end where the TARDIS was parked was filmed in Pontypridd in September 2006. The scenes featuring Martha's family were recorded in October 2006, also mainly in Pontypridd. The street scenes with Tish at the start of the episode were filmed on Queen Street in Cardiff in October.

The overall shape of the hospital was also modified to resemble the more square shape of St Thomas' Hospital. Early in the episode, a shot of the front of Singleton Hospital is seen where part of the building has been removed and an image of the London Eye added to make it appear that the hospital is in the location of St. Thomas'.

The final thing filmed for the episode was a shot in which the Doctor turns a deadbolt handle to lock a door, and does not depict David Tennant's own hand. Originally the scene had the Doctor use his Sonic Screwdriver to lock the door. It did not occur to anyone on the production staff that this contradicted a prior scene in which the Sonic Screwdriver is destroyed until post-production. The shot of him using the lock was hastily filmed and inserted.

=== Music ===
The first use of Martha's theme in the music for the episode is sung by Melanie Pappenheim. She previously featured in "The Doctor's Theme", "Bad Wolf Theme" and "Doomsday". The music at the start of the episode, when Martha is talking on the phone to her family, is "Sunshine" by Arrested Development.

=== Cast notes ===
- Freema Agyeman previously played Adeola Oshodi in "Army of Ghosts" (2006).
- Adjoa Andoh previously appeared as Sister Jatt in the Tenth Doctor episode "New Earth" (2006).
- Anne Reid previously appeared as Nurse Crane in the Seventh Doctor story The Curse of Fenric (1989).
- Trevor Laird previously appeared as Frax in the Sixth Doctor story Mindwarp (1986).
- Roy Marsden previously appeared in the Eighth Doctor audio drama Human Resources.

== Broadcast and reception ==
It was originally planned that the episode would air on 17 March 2007; however, the date was shifted back a week to 24 March, when it was realised that it would have gone up against the final of ITV1 series Dancing on Ice. The episode was then shifted back another week, to 31 March, because of England's European Championship qualifier against Israel on 24 March. "Smith and Jones" and "The Shakespeare Code" were previewed to the press on 21 March. This created much hype in the press for the new series in the days leading up to broadcast. Two specially created trailers for the third series were shown on the BBC in the two weeks before broadcast. These trailers featured clips from the series, predominantly with clips of "Smith and Jones".

The first North American broadcast of the episode occurred on 18 June 2007, when the CBC aired it in Canada. "Smith and Jones" takes place after the 2006 Christmas special "The Runaway Bride", but the CBC aired them in reverse order. The episode made its US broadcast debut on 6 July 2007, on the Sci Fi Channel, directly following "The Runaway Bride".

Dave Bradley of SFX gave "Smith and Jones" five out of five stars, calling it an "explosive start" and praising Martha's character and the Judoon. IGN's Travis Fickett rated the episode 8.2 out of 10, believing it started the series with a "fun alien invasion story as well as a terrific introduction" for Martha. The Stage reviewer Scott Matthewman noted that the science in the episode "doesn't stand up to close scrutiny" and felt that Martha's family was the "weakest part" because they seemed to be "little more than a sitcom caricature", but he praised Agyeman and her character. Dek Hogan of Digital Spy was more mixed, saying that "a little bit of the magic seems to have gone", citing Finnegan as perhaps not a "terrifying enough monster for the first episode" and that Martha's "complicated family baggage" contributed to making her not as good a character as Rose Tyler and Donna Noble had been.

== Notes ==
Locations
