= Travis Oliver =

British actor

- Born: 18 March; Belgium
- Occupation: Actor

Travis Oliver (born 18 March) is a British actor. He is possibly best known for his role as Oliver Ryan in the ITV series Footballers' Wives: Extra Time between 2005 and 2006. He's also made appearances in BBC's Doctor Who (2007) and the film Lesbian Vampire Killers (2009).

== Biography ==
He was born in Belgium, but grew up near Farnham, Surrey, where he attended Frensham Heights School, at the same time as fellow actors Hattie Morahan, Tobias Menzies, Rufus Hound and Jim Sturgess. However, it wasn't until after gaining a degree in Economics from University College London that he began to pursue acting, training at Drama Studio London.

His first television role was as Jake McQueen in the BBC series Doctors. He has since gone on to appear in programmes such as Holby City, Footballers' Wives: Extra Time, the BBC's 2004 adaptation of North & South, and the Doctor Who episode "Gridlock" as Milo.

At the 2006 Edinburgh Fringe Festival, he played the title character in the Fringe First nominated one-man show, Diamond Johnny Ray, by Cathianne Hall.

2009 saw his first appearance in a major feature film, playing the American actor John Hoyt in Me and Orson Welles, directed by Richard Linklater.

In 2015 he returned to the world of Doctor Who playing Chris Cwej, companion of the Seventh Doctor, in the Big Finish adaptation of Russell T Davies' Virgin New Adventures novel Damaged Goods. He reprised the role for adaptations of Original Sin and Cold Fusion.

== Filmography ==
Year	Film	Role	Notes
2003	Unbelievably British	Hugh	Short film
2003– 2004	Doctors	Jake McQueen	
2004	Soldiers: Heroes of World War II	American soldier	Video game
2004	North & South	Capt. Maxwell Lennox	3 episodes
2004	Holby City	Martin Kerman	1 episode: "Playing with Fire"
2005– 2006	Footballers' Wives: Extra Time	Oliver Ryan	Series regular
2007	Everything to Dance For	Mark	
2007	Doctor Who	Milo	1 episode: "Gridlock"
2008	The Last Enemy	Eleanor's Husband	TV mini-series
2008	Hotel Babylon	Giles Hamilton	Episode 3.2
2008	Me and Orson Welles	John Hoyt	
2009	Lesbian Vampire Killers	Steve	
2009	Enid	Army officer	TV film
2009	Comedy Showcase	Frank	1 episode: "The Amazing Dermot"
2010	Casualty	James Molloy	3 episodes
2010	Don't Call Back	Wilson	Completed
2011	Threesome	Ben	2 episodes
2012	Cardinal Burns	Nate	1 episode
2015	A Doll's House		Pre-production
2017	For the Love of George	David	Post-production
2017	Het Tweede Gelaat	Cody	Filming
