= Utopia (Doctor Who) =

187a – "Utopia"
- Doctor Who episode

Cast
- Doctor: David Tennant – Tenth Doctor
- Companions: Freema Agyeman – Martha Jones; John Barrowman – Jack Harkness
- Others: Derek Jacobi – Professor Yana; Chipo Chung – Chantho; René Zagger – Padra; Neil Reidman – Lieutenant Atillo; Paul Marc Davis (Note: Credited as Paul Marc Davies) – Chieftain; Robert Forknall – Guard; John Bell – Creet; Deborah Maclaren – Kistane; Abigail Canton – Wiry Woman; John Simm – The Master

Production
- Directed by: Graeme Harper
- Written by: Russell T Davies
- Produced by: Phil Collinson
- Executive producers: Russell T Davies; Julie Gardner
- Music by: Murray Gold
- Production code: 3.11
- Series: Series 3
- Running time: 1st of 3-part story, 45 minutes
- First broadcast: 16 June 2007

Chronology
← Preceded by "Blink"	Followed by → "The Sound of Drums"

"Utopia" is the eleventh episode of the third series of the revived British science fiction television series Doctor Who. It was broadcast on BBC One on 16 June 2007. It is the first of three episodes that form a linked narrative, followed by "The Sound of Drums" and "Last of the Time Lords". The episode serves to re-introduce the Master (John Simm), a Time Lord villain of the show's original run who last appeared in the 1996 television movie Doctor Who.

Set close to the end of the universe 100 trillion years in the future, the episode involves Professor Yana (Derek Jacobi) attempting to send the last of humanity in a rocket to a place called "Utopia".

== Plot ==
The Ninth Doctor's former companion Jack is stranded on Earth and has based himself in 21st-century Cardiff to wait for the Doctor, knowing the Doctor would eventually land there to refuel with the Cardiff Rift. (Note: The Ninth Doctor did this before in the 2005 episode "Boom Town".) He uses the severed hand of the Tenth Doctor as a Doctor detector. (Note: The Doctor's hand is cut off, and immediately grows back, in the 2005 episode "The Christmas Invasion".) After landing the TARDIS in Cardiff to refuel, the Tenth Doctor sees Jack racing towards the TARDIS and departs. (Note: Jack prepares to leave 21st-century Cardiff shortly before "something" takes him away in the 2007 Torchwood episode "End of Days".) Jack grabs onto the outer shell, causing the TARDIS to fly to the end of the universe trying to shake him off. Jack dies on the journey but revives seconds later as he cannot stay dead. As they explore the planet Malcassairo, the Doctor, Jack, and the Doctor's companion Martha encounter Padra, a lone human running for his life from cannibalistic humanoids called the Futurekind.

The Doctor, Jack, and Martha help Padra reach a missile silo where a rocket intends to transport the last of the human race to "Utopia". While there they meet the elderly Professor Yana and his insectoid assistant Chantho. The Professor asks the Doctor to look at their rocket engine to determine why it will not launch, and the Doctor helps him repair it and give it power. During the repairs, the Professor repeatedly hears a rhythmic drumbeat he has heard his entire life. When the rocket is ready to launch, the refugees board it. One of the Futurekind shorts the system out, filling the room with the rocket couplings with deadly radiation. Jack is enlisted to fix the couplings.

While Jack is inside working, the Doctor admits he abandoned Jack purposely because of the immortality Rose granted to Jack. (Note: Though not mentioned at the time as granting him immortality, the 2005 episode "The Parting of the Ways" depicts Rose bringing Jack back to life.) Jack readies the rocket for launch. Martha unintentionally draws attention to the Professor's fob watch, similar to the one which changed the Doctor from a Time Lord into a human. (Note: As depicted in the 2007 episodes "Human Nature" and "The Family of Blood".) She rushes to tell the Doctor about the watch as the Professor hears voices coming from it.

The Doctor initiates the launch sequence of the rocket at the same time that the Professor opens the fob watch. A frantic Doctor runs back to the control room, but the Professor lets the Futurekind inside the silo. Chantho confronts the Professor. He responds that his name is the Master. Chantho and the Master both fatally injure each other. The Master leaves in the TARDIS, with the hand inside, and regenerates into a younger form. The Doctor, Jack, and Martha are stranded.

=== Continuity ===
The episode marks the return of the Master, who last appeared during the 1996 television movie Doctor Who.

Derek Jacobi plays the fifth version of the Master whom the Doctor has encountered on screen, and John Simm is the sixth. At least one television pundit speculated whether "Mister Saxon" was an intentional anagram of "Master No. Six" or was perhaps "a big red herring". However, when asked, Russell T Davies stated that it was not deliberate.

== Production ==
This episode was announced as the first of a three-part story in Totally Doctor Who, broadcast the day before. Prior to this, only the following two instalments had been linked. Later reference material, including Doctor Who Magazine's season poll, treated the three episodes as a single three-part story. Russell T Davies has said that he regards "Utopia" as a separate story, but notes that the determination is arbitrary.

This is the first episode in the revived series to credit three principal cast members within the title sequence, with the addition of John Barrowman, who plays Captain Jack Harkness.

=== Casting ===
This is Derek Jacobi's third involvement in Doctor Who. The first was in the September 2003 audio drama Deadline, where he played a screenwriter who believes himself to be the Doctor. The second was several months later, in the webcast Scream of the Shalka, where he played an android version of the Master. In 2017, Jacobi reprised his role from "Utopia" in the audio drama series The War Master.

Other actors returning to the franchise in this episode are Neil Reidman had previously played Tom Braudy in the Eighth Doctor audio drama Memory Lane and Robert Forknall, who plays Lord Byron in the Eighth Doctor audio drama The Company of Friends.

Chipo Chung, who played Chantho, would later go on to play the Fortuneteller in "Turn Left". Paul Marc Davis, who played the Futurekind chieftain, also returned to the Doctor Who universe, going on to play the role of The Trickster in The Sarah Jane Adventures stories Whatever Happened to Sarah Jane, The Temptation of Sarah Jane Smith and The Wedding of Sarah Jane Smith. He also had a small role in Torchwood story Exit Wounds and played the lead villain Corakinus in Class.

John Bell was a nine-year-old who won a Blue Peter competition to appear in this episode.

John Simm reprised his role as the Master in the Tenth Doctor's final story "The End of Time" and reprised the role again in "World Enough and Time" and "The Doctor Falls", the finale of Series 10, the final series to feature Peter Capaldi as the Twelfth Doctor and Michelle Gomez as Missy. Simm reprised the role once again in the audio drama Masterful by Big Finish Productions.

=== Music ===
Music originally composed for Torchwood can be heard in the background of this episode: a variation of the Torchwood theme plays when Jack runs towards the TARDIS and a motif plays when Jack lies dead, having ridden on the TARDIS through the Vortex. The drumming motif is suggestive of the fifth and subsequent bars of the Doctor Who theme tune as composed by Ron Grainer and realised by Delia Derbyshire.

== Broadcast and reception ==
"Utopia" was first broadcast in the United Kingdom on BBC One on 16 June 2007. Overnight rating showed that it was watched by 7.3 million viewers, which rose to 7.84 million when time-shifted viewers were taken into account. This made it the fourth most-watched programme on BBC One for the week. It received an Appreciation Index of 87.

IGN's Travis Fickett gave the episode a rating of 8.4 out of 10, calling it "one hell of a way to kick off the finale episodes of the season", particularly praising how various elements planted in previous episodes came into importance. However, he was critical of the beginning of the episode, writing that Jack's entrance was "a bit silly" and "the remnants of civilization look like Mad Max rejects being chased by space vampires". Richard Edwards of SFX gave "Utopia" four out of five stars, feeling that it was "minimally plotted" as it was part of a larger story but praising Jack's backstory and the return of the Master. The Stage reviewer Mark Wright was mixed towards "Utopia", disliking the first 20 minutes on the planet but enjoying the introduction of Jacobi as Yana, particularly the reveal of his true nature. He wondered what casual fans would make of it.

The episode has been noted by various reviewers and writers for its cliffhanger. It was listed among the best cliffhangers of the series by Charlie Jane Anders of io9, Den of Geek's Jeff Szpirglas, and was chosen by Mark Harrison as the best cliffhanger of the Tenth Doctor's era in another Den of Geek article. It was also chosen among the five best of the revived series by Morgan Jeffery and Chris Allen of Digital Spy; Jeffery referred to it as a "stunning accumulator cliffhanger" while Allen called it a "superb cliffhanger" that "lifts 'Utopia' from a fairly average episode into something altogether different". Stephen Brook of The Guardian called it "perhaps the best moment of the entire series" in his review of the third series.
