= List of awards and nominations received by Doctor Who =

Doctor Who awards and nominations
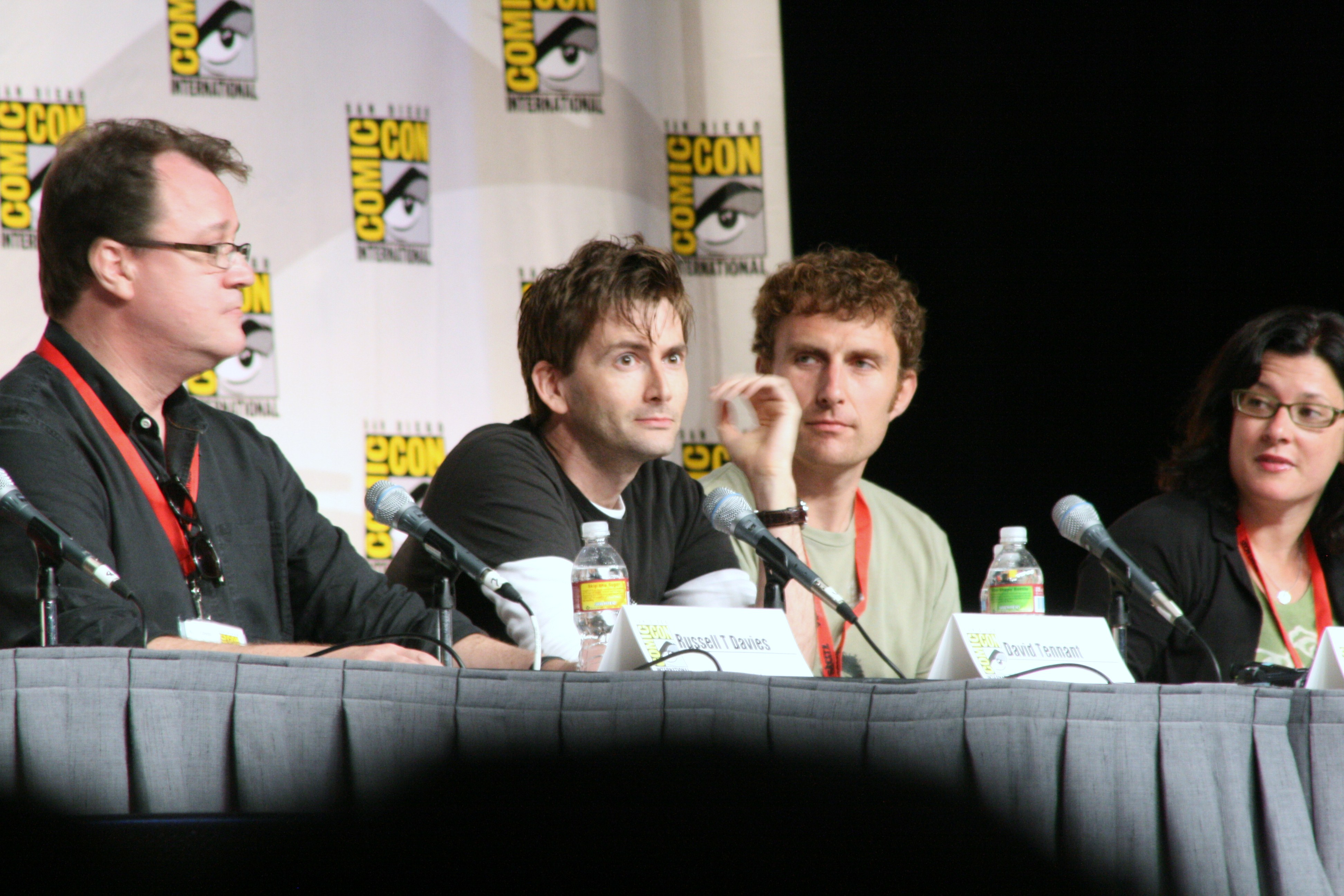
- Multi-awarded contributors to the series in 2009 (left to right): producer and writer Russell T Davies, actor David Tennant (Tenth Doctor), director of several episodes Euros Lyn and executive producer Julie Gardner.
Awards and nominations
Award	Wins	Nominations
Anglophile Awards	0	1
Audie Awards	2	4
Audio and Radio Industry Awards	0	1
Auntie Awards	1	1
BAFTA Cymru Awards	33	75
BAFTA Scotland Awards	0	7
BAFTA TV Awards	8	32
BBC Audio Drama Awards	2	7
BBC's "Drama Best Of"	12	19
BBC Radio 1 Teen Awards	1	4
British Fantasy Awards	2	3
Broadcast Awards	0	1
Broadcasting Press Guild Awards	0	7
Constellation Awards	12	25
Critics' Choice Super Awards	0	7
Critics' Choice Television Awards	0	1
Diversity in Media Awards	0	1
Edinburgh International Television Festival	2	2
GLAAD Media Awards	0	2
Glamour Awards	1	1
Glenfiddich Spirit of Scotland Awards	1	1
Golden Nymphs	0	2
Hugo Awards	6	37
IGN Best of Television Awards	2	8
National Television Awards	16	28
Nebula/Ray Bradbury Awards	1	6
Nickelodean's Kid's Choice Awards	0	2
Peabody Awards	1	1
People's Choice Awards	0	4
PinkNews Awards	1	1
Primetime Emmy Awards	0	2
Rockie Awards	1	1
RTS Television Awards	3	15
Satellite Awards	0	3
Saturn Awards	3	24
Scream Awards	1	7
Scribe Awards	6	23
Seoul International Drama Awards	1	1
SFX Awards	28	48
Sunday Herald Culture Awards	1	1
TV Quick Awards	16	33
TV Times Award	0	1
TRIC Awards	3	5
TV Moments Awards	2	2
TV Times Awards	0	1
VES Awards	1	6
Visionary Arts Organisation Award	1	1
Writer's Guild of Great Britain	2	5

Totals (Note: Certain award groups do not simply award one winner. They acknowledge several different recipients, have runners-up, and have third place. Since this is a specific recognition and is different from losing an award, runner-up mentions are considered wins in this award tally. For simplification and to avoid errors, each award in this list has been presumed to have had a prior nomination.)
- Wins: 173
- Nominations: 470

This is a list of awards and nominations received by Doctor Who, a British science-fiction television series. Overall, Doctor Who has received 173 awards and 470 nominations.

== Awards ==
=== Anglophile Awards ===
Year	Category	Nominee(s)	Result	Ref.
2016	Best Actor in a Television Series	Peter Capaldi	Nominated	

=== Audie Awards ===
The Audie Awards are annually presented by the American Audio Publishers Association for audiobooks and spoken-word entertainment.

Year	Category	Nominee(s)	Result	Ref.
2015	Best Package Design	Doctor Who: The Light at the End	Won	
2017	Best Audio Drama	Doctor Who: Death and the Queen	Nominated	
2017	Best Audio Drama	Doctor Who: The War Doctor: Only The Monstrous	Nominated	
2021	Best Audio Drama	Doctor Who: Stranded 1	Won	

=== Audio and Radio Industry Awards ===
The Audio and Radio Industry Awards are annually presented by the Radio Academy to award excellence in UK radio and audio presenting and production.

Year	Category	Nominee(s)	Result	Ref.
2021	Best Fictional Storytelling	Doctor Who: Out of Time	Nominated	

=== BAFTA ===
In 2006 Doctor Who was nominated for the British Academy Television Awards (BAFTA), shortlisted in the "Drama Series" category. Doctor Who was also nominated in several other categories in the BAFTA Craft Awards, including Writer (Russell T Davies), Director (Joe Ahearne), and Break-through Talent (production designer Edward Thomas). However, it did not win any of its categories at the Craft Awards.

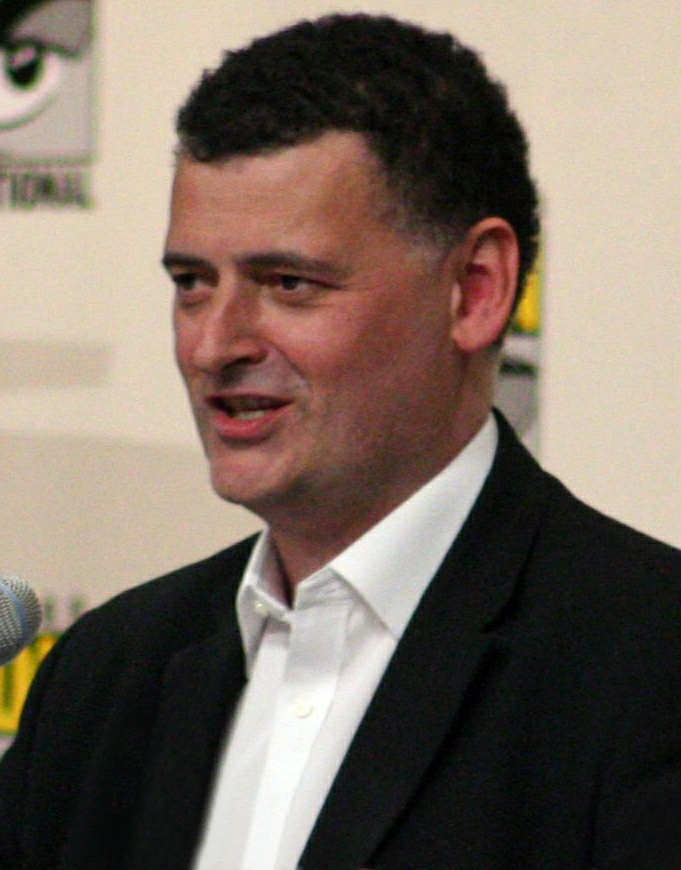
Steven Moffat has been praised for his writing inventiveness in Doctor Who, in particular for the 2006 episode "The Girl in the Fireplace" and the 2007 episode "Blink", for which he won a BAFTA TV Award and a BAFTA Cymru Award. The episodes both won the Hugo Award for Best Dramatic Presentation.

On 22 April 2006, the programme won five categories (out of 14 nominations) at the lower-profile BAFTA Cymru awards, given to programmes made in Wales. It won Best Drama Series, Drama Director (James Hawes), Costume, Make-up and Photography Direction. Russell T Davies also won the Siân Phillips Award for Outstanding Contribution to Network Television. At the BAFTA Cymru awards the following year the programme won eight of the 13 categories in which it was nominated, including Best Actor for David Tennant and Best Drama Director for Graeme Harper.

On 7 May 2006, the winners of the British Academy Television Awards were announced, and Doctor Who won both of the categories it was nominated for, the Best Drama Series and audience-voted Pioneer Award. Russell T Davies also won the Dennis Potter Award for Outstanding Writing for Television. Writer Steven Moffat won the Writer category at the 2008 BAFTA Craft Awards for his 2007 Doctor Who episode "Blink".

The series also won awards at the BAFTA Cymru ceremony on 27 April 2008, including "Best Screenwriter" for Steven Moffat, "Best Director: Drama" for James Strong, "Best Director Of Photography: Drama" for Ernie Vincze, "Best Sound" for the BBC Cymru Wales Sound Team and "Best Make-Up" for Barbara Southcott and Neill Gorton (of Millennium FX).

In March 2009, it was announced that Doctor Who had again been nominated in the "Drama Series" category for the British Academy Television Awards; however, it lost to the BBC series Wallander at the Awards on Sunday 26 April. The series picked up two BAFTAs at the British Academy Television Craft Awards on Sunday 17 May. Visual Effects company The Mill won the "Visual Effects" award for the episode "The Fires of Pompeii" and Philip Kloss won in the "Editing Fiction/Entertainment" category.

In 2011 Matt Smith was nominated for best television actor at the 2011 Bafta Television Awards, but eventually lost out to Daniel Rigby from Eric and Ernie. It was the first time an actor portraying the Doctor had received such a nomination.

In 2012 the production team was nominated for the BAFTA Craft Awards Visual Effects category.

==== BAFTA Cymru Awards ====
Year	Category	Nominee(s)	Result	Ref.
2006	Best Drama Series/Serial	Phil Collinson	Won	
2006	Best Actor	Christopher Eccleston	Nominated	
2006	Best Actress	Billie Piper	Nominated	
2006	Best Director – Drama	James Hawes for "The Christmas Invasion"	Won	
2006	Best Screenwriter	Russell T Davies	Nominated	
2006	Best Original Music Soundtrack	Murray Gold for "The Christmas Invasion"	Nominated	
2006	Best Sound	Paul Jefferies, Paul McFadden, Ian Richardson and Tim Ricketts	Nominated	
2006	Best Director of Photography – Drama	Ernest Vincze for "The Christmas Invasion"	Won	
2006	Best Costume	Lucinda Wright	Won	
2006	Best Make-Up	Davie Jones and Neill Gorton	Won	
2006	Best Design	Edward Thomas for "The Christmas Invasion"	Nominated	
2006	Best Graphics/Titles	The Mill for "The Christmas Invasion"	Nominated	
2006	Siân Phillips Award for Outstanding Contribution to Network Television	Russell T Davies	Won	
2007	Best Actor	David Tennant for "Doomsday"	Won	
2007	Best Actress	Billie Piper for "Doomsday"	Nominated	
2007	Best Screenplay	Russell T Davies for "Doomsday"	Won	
2007	Best Director – Drama	Graeme Harper for "Doomsday"	Won	
2007	Best Drama Series	Phil Collinson for "Doomsday"	Nominated	
2007	Best Original Music Soundtrack	Murray Gold for "The Impossible Planet"	Won	
2007	Best Costume	Louise Page for "The Girl in the Fireplace"	Won	
2007	Best Make-Up	Neill Gorton and Sheelagh Wells for "The Girl in the Fireplace"	Won	
2007	Best Design	Edward Thomas for "The Girl in the Fireplace"	Nominated	
2007	Best Director of Photography – Drama	Rory Taylor for "Tooth and Claw"	Nominated	
2007	Best Editor	Cripspin Green for "Tooth and Claw"	Won	
2007	Best Lighting Director: Not Camera	Mark Hutchings for "New Earth"	Won	
2008	Best Drama Series/Serial	Phil Collinson for "Voyage of the Damned"	Won	
2008	Best Director	James Strong for "Voyage of the Damned"	Won	
2008	Best Screenwriter	Steven Moffat for "Blink"	Won	
2008	Best Sound	BBC Wales sound team for "Voyage of the Damned"	Won	
2008	Best Director of Photography – Drama	Ernest Vincze for "Voyage of the Damned"	Won	
2008	Best Costume	Louise Page for "The Shakespeare Code"	Nominated	
2008	Best Make-Up	Neill Gorton and Barbara Southcott for "The Shakespeare Code"	Won	
2009	Best Drama Series/Serial	Phil Collinson	Nominated	
2009	Best Director – Drama	Euros Lyn for "Silence in the Library"	Won	
2009	Best Screenwriter	Russell T Davies for "Midnight"	Won	
2009	Best Original Music Soundtrack	Murray Gold for "Midnight"	Nominated	
2009	Best Sound	Julian Howarth, Tim Ricketts, Paul McFadden and Paul Jefferies for "Midnight"	Won	
2009	Best Director of Photography – Drama	Rory Taylor for "Silence in the Library"	Nominated	
2009	Best Make-Up	Barbara Southcott for "The Next Doctor"	Nominated	
2009	Best Editor	Philip Kloss for "Midnight"	Won	
2010	Best Drama Series/Serial	Tracie Simpson for "The End of Time: Part One"	Nominated	
2010	Best Make-Up	Barbara Southcott for "The End of Time: Part One"	Won	
2010	Best Design	Edward Thomas for "The Waters of Mars"	Won	
2011	Best Sound	Tim Ricketts for "A Christmas Carol"	Won	
2011	Best Make-Up & Hair	Barbara Southcott for "The Vampires of Venice"	Nominated	
2011	Best Editing: Fiction	William Oswald for "The Time of Angels"	Nominated	
2011	Best Lighting	Mark Hutchings for "The Eleventh Hour"	Won	
2012	Best Television Drama	Marcus Wilson for "The Impossible Astronaut"	Nominated	
2012	Best Sound	The Doctor Who sound team for "The Wedding of River Song"	Nominated	
2012	Best Digital Creativity & Games	BBC Wales interactive team, Sumo Digital & Revolution Software for "Doctor Who: The Adventure Games – The Gunpowder Plot"	Won	
2013	Best Sound	The Doctor Who sound team	Nominated	
2013	Best Editing	William Oswald for "The Snowmen"	Nominated	
2014	Best Sound	The Doctor Who sound team	Nominated	
2014	Best Special Effects	The Doctor Who Effects team	Won	
2014	Best Music and Entertainment Programme	Doctor Who at the Proms	Nominated	
2015	Best Actor	Peter Capaldi for "Dark Water"	Nominated	
2015	Best Actress	Jenna Coleman for "Kill the Moon"	Nominated	
2015	Best Editing	Will Oswald for "Dark Water"	Nominated	
2015	Best Special and Visual Effects	Doctor Who Production Team for "Last Christmas"	Nominated	
2015	Best Titles and Graphic Identity	Doctor Who Production Team for "Deep Breath"	Nominated	
2016	Technical Achievement Commendation	BBC Cymru, BBC Digital Creativity, Aardman Animations for Doctor Who Game Maker	Nominated	
2016	Sound & Music Commendation for Doctor Who Game Maker	BBC Cymru, BBC Digital Creativity, Aardman Animations for Doctor Who Game Maker	Nominated	
2016	Best Editing	Will Oswald	Nominated	
2016	Best Special and Visual Effects, Titles and Graphic Identity	Doctor Who Production Team for "The Magician's Apprentice"	Won	
2019	Best Special and Visual Effects	Doctor Who Production Team for "The Doctor Falls"	Nominated	
2019	Outstanding Actress	Jodie Whittaker	Nominated	
2019	Excellence in Production Design	Arwel Wyn Jones	Nominated	
2019	Outstanding Television Drama	Doctor Who	Nominated	
2020	Best Director	Lee Haven Jones for "Spyfall Part 2"	Nominated	
2020	Best Editing	Rebecca Trotman	Won	
2024	Actor	Ncuti Gatwa	Won	
2024	Editing	Tim Hodges	Nominated	
2024	Make-Up and Hair	Claire Williams	Nominated	
2024	Sound	Sound Team	Nominated	
2024	Writing	Russell T Davies	Nominated	

==== BAFTA Scotland Awards ====
Year	Category	Nominee(s)	Result	Ref.
2008	Best Writer	Steven Moffat	Nominated	
2009	Best Actor	David Tennant	Nominated	
2015	Best Actress	Michelle Gomez	Nominated	
2015	Best Writer	Steven Moffat	Nominated	
2016	Best Actor	Peter Capaldi	Nominated	
2025	Best Actor	Ncuti Gatwa	Nominated	
2025	Audience Award	Ncuti Gatwa	Nominated	

==== BAFTA TV Awards ====
Year	Category	Nominee(s)	Result	Ref.
1977	'Harlequin' (Drama/Light Entertainment)	Philip Hinchcliffe	Nominated	
1978	'Harlequin' (Drama/Light Entertainment)	Graham Williams	Nominated	
2006	Best Drama Series	Phil Collinson, Russell T Davies and Julie Gardner	Won	
2006	Best Director	Joe Ahearne	Nominated	
2006	Best Writer	Russell T Davies	Nominated	
2006	Audience Award	Doctor Who	Won	
2006	Break-Through Talent	Edward Thomas	Nominated	
2006	New Media Developer	Jo Pearce and Andrew Whitehouse for "Attack of the Graske"	Nominated	
2006	Dennis Potter Award	Russell T Davies	Won	
2007	Best Editing Fiction/Entertainment	Crispin Green	Nominated	
2007	Best Visual Effects	The Mill	Nominated	
2008	Best Writer	Steven Moffat for "Blink"	Won	
2008	Best Original Television Music	Murray Gold	Nominated	
2008	Best Sound Fiction/Entertainment	BBC Wales sound team	Nominated	
2009	Best Drama Series	Phil Collinson, Russell T Davies, Julie Gardner and Susie Liggat	Nominated	
2009	Best Writer	Russell T Davies for "Midnight"	Nominated	
2009	Best Editing Fiction/Entertainment	Philip Kloss	Won	
2010	Best Visual Effects	The Mill	Nominated	
2011	Best Actor	Matt Smith	Nominated	
2011	Best Visual Effects	The Mill	Nominated	
2012	Best Visual Effects	The Mill	Nominated	
2013	Best Visual Effects and Graphic Design	The Mill	Nominated	
2013	Best Original Television Music	Murray Gold for "Asylum of the Daleks"	Nominated	
2014	Radio Times Audience Award	"The Day of the Doctor"	Won	
2014	Best Special Effects	Milk VFX, Real SFX, The Model Unit for "The Day of the Doctor"	Won	
2014	Best Entertainment Craft Team	Alex Hartman, Saul Gittens, Dan Evans, Amer Iqbal for "Doctor Who at the Proms"	Nominated	
2015	Best Visual Effects	Milk VFX, Real SFX, BBC Wales VFX	Won	
2016	Best Supporting Actress	Michelle Gomez	Nominated	
2016	Best Visual Effects	Milk VFX, Millennium FX, Real SFX, Molinare	Nominated	
2019	Virgin Media's Must-See Moment for "Rosa refuses to move"	"Rosa"	Nominated	
2024	P&O Cruises Memorable Moment Award for "Ncuti Gatwa being revealed as the 15th Doctor"	"The Giggle"	Nominated	
2024	Titles and Graphic Identity	Dan May, James Coore, Painting Practice, Realtime Visualisation for "Wild Blue Yonder"	Nominated	

=== BBC ===
==== Auntie Awards ====
In 1996, BBC television held the "Auntie Awards" as the culmination of their "TV60" series, celebrating 60 years of BBC television broadcasting, where Doctor Who was voted as the "Best Popular Drama" the corporation had ever produced, ahead of such ratings heavyweights as EastEnders and Casualty. All people involved into the last years of the series were rewarded, including actors Peter Davison (Fifth Doctor) and Sylvester McCoy (Seventh Doctor), who became the first actors to win an award for their role as the Doctor.

Year	Category	Nominee(s)	Result	Ref.
1996	Best Popular Drama Series	Doctor Who	Won	

==== BBC Audio Drama Awards ====
The BBC Audio Drama Awards is an awards ceremony created by BBC Radio to recognise excellence in the radio industry, in particular in audio dramas. The first awards were presented in 2012 and the ceremony has been located at BBC Radio's home Radio Theatre, Broadcasting House. Two Doctor Who audio dramas produced by Big Finish Productions have won the Best Audio Drama Award, in 2014 and 2017 respectively.

Year	Category	Nominee(s)	Result	Ref.
2014	Best Online or Non-Broadcast Drama	Doctor Who: Dark Eyes	Won	
2015	Best Online or Non-Broadcast Drama	Doctor Who: The Light at the End	Nominated	
2015	Best Online or Non-Broadcast Drama	Jago & Litefoot: Encore of the Scorchies	Nominated	
2017	Best Online Only Audio Drama	Doctor Who: Absent Friends	Won	
2017	Best Online Only Audio Drama	Doctor Who: Death and the Queen	Nominated	
2019	Best Actor	Derek Jacobi for The War Master: Beneath the Viscoid	Nominated	
2023	Best Podcast Audio Drama	Doctor Who: The Ninth Doctor Adventures	Nominated	

==== BBC's "Drama Best Of" ====
Doctor Who was extremely popular at the BBC.co.uk's online "Best of Drama" poll and swept all the categories (except "Worst Drama") in both 2005 and 2006, the last two years it was made.

In 2005 it beat 29 other nominations with more than 50% of votes in every category, except Best Villain, especially winning Best Drama with 55.86% (ahead of the second-ranked series Bleak House with 15.95%). It also reached the second place in three categories it was nominated twice (Best Actor, Favourite Moment and Most Desirable Star, with the four highest ranks for the last one).

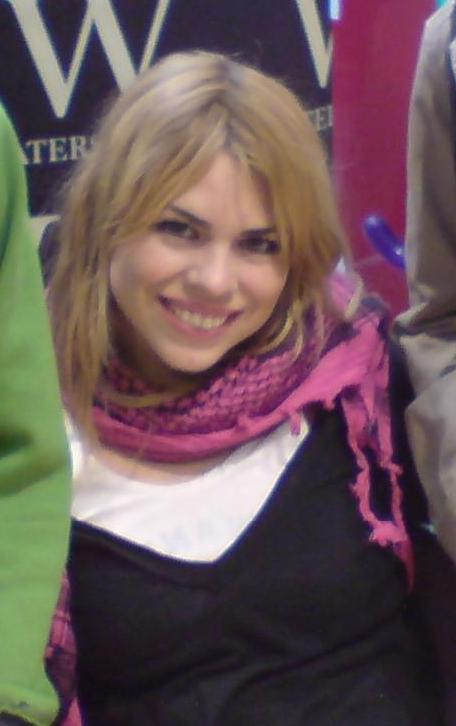
Billie Piper (Rose Tyler) was the highest rated in three BBC's "Best Of" lists: Best Actress in 2005 and 2006, and Most Desirable Star in 2005.

In 2005 Christopher Eccleston obtained 59.42% of votes as the Ninth Doctor and David Tennant was ranked second with 9.15% as the Tenth Doctor.

In almost every category of the BBC's list there were 30 nominations. However, only the five best ranked are finally presented (the others figure on a list). The Doctor Who nominees presented here are the ones which was on top 5 (which does not include, for example, John Barrowman's 2005 nomination for Best Actor due to his 14th place).

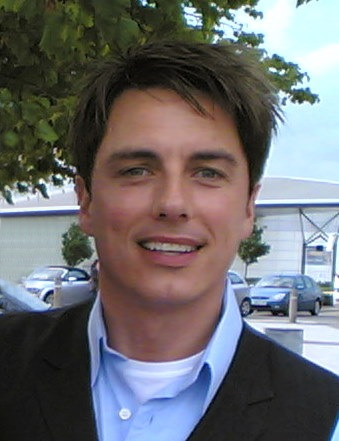
John Barrowman was nominated in two categories at the 2005 BBC's "Drama Best Of": Best Actor (ranked 14th) and Most Desirable Star (ranked 4th), his only nominations for Doctor Who; however, he was nominated for several awards for reprising his role of Jack Harkness in its spin-off Torchwood.

Year	Category	Nominee(s)	Result	Ref.
2005	Best Drama	Doctor Who	Won	
2005	Best Actor	Christopher Eccleston	Won	
2005	Best Actor	David Tennant	Nominated	
2005	Best Actress	Billie Piper	Won	
2005	Favourite Moment	"The return of the Daleks"	Won	
2005	Favourite Moment	"The Doctor regenerates"	Nominated	
2005	Best Villain	The Daleks	Won	
2005	Best Villain	The Emperor Dalek	Nominated	
2005	Most Desirable Star	Christopher Eccleston	Nominated	
2005	Most Desirable Star	David Tennant	Nominated	
2005	Most Desirable Star	Billie Piper	Won	
2005	Most Desirable Star	John Barrowman	Nominated	
2005	Best Drama Website	Doctor Who	Won	
2006	Best Drama	Doctor Who	Won	
2006	Best Actor	David Tennant	Won	
2006	Best Actress	Billie Piper	Won	
2006	Favourite Moment	"Daleks vs Cybermen"	Nominated	
2006	Favourite Moment	"Rose's exit"	Won	
2006	Best Drama Website	Doctor Who	Won	

==== BBC Radio 1 Teen Awards ====
Doctor Who was nominated at the 2010 BBC Radio 1 Teen Awards for 'Best TV Show'. It lost out to Channel 4's The Inbetweeners. However, the show went on to win at the 2013 awards. It was also nominated at the 2017 awards.

Year	Category	Nominee(s)	Result	Ref.
2010	Best TV Show	Doctor Who	Nominated	
2013	Best TV Show	Doctor Who	Won	
2016	Best TV Show	Doctor Who	Nominated	
2017	Best TV Show	Doctor Who	Nominated	

==== TV Moments Awards ====
BBC Awarded to a scene of the episode "The Doctor Dances" the TV Moments Award for Top Moment of May/June 2005. Finally, the moment was nominated as all the others "Top Moment" winners of the year for the Golden Moment Award, which he also won.

Year	Category	Nominee(s)	Result	Ref.
2005	May/June Top Moment	"The Doctor, Rose and Jack hear a deadly voice" for "The Doctor Dances"	Won	
2005	Golden Moment	"The Doctor, Rose and Jack hear a deadly voice" for "The Doctor Dances"	Won	

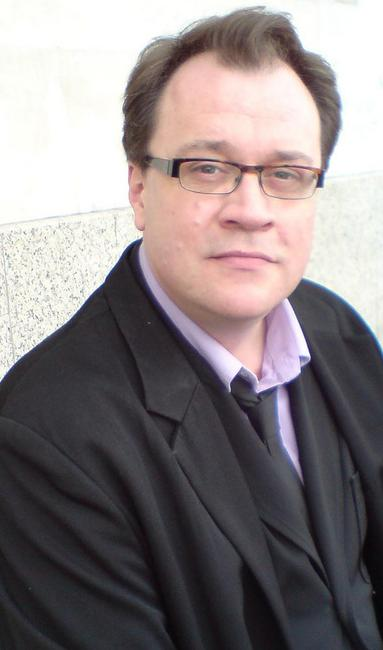
Russell T Davies has been praised for his writing abilities. He has won twelve awards overall (including two British Fantasy Awards) for his contributions to the revived series.

=== British Fantasy Awards ===
In 2009, Doctor Who won the inaugural Best Television Award at the British Fantasy Awards. It won the award again the following year.

Year	Category	Nominee(s)	Result	Ref.
2009	Best Television	Russell T Davies for "Doctor Who"	Won	
2010	Best Television	Russell T Davies for "Doctor Who"	Won	
2014	Best Film/Television Episode	Steven Moffat for "The Day of the Doctor"	Nominated	

=== Broadcast Awards ===
In 2012, Doctor Who was nominated at the Broadcast Awards (presented by the eponymous magazine) in the Best International Programme Sales category, along its spin-off Torchwood.

Year	Category	Nominee(s)	Result	Ref.
2012	Best International Programme Sales	Doctor Who	Nominated	

=== Broadcasting Press Guild Awards ===
The Broadcasting Press Guilt Awards are presented by the Broadcasting Press Guild, a British association of journalists. Doctor Who have been nominated for seven awards overall, but did not win any.

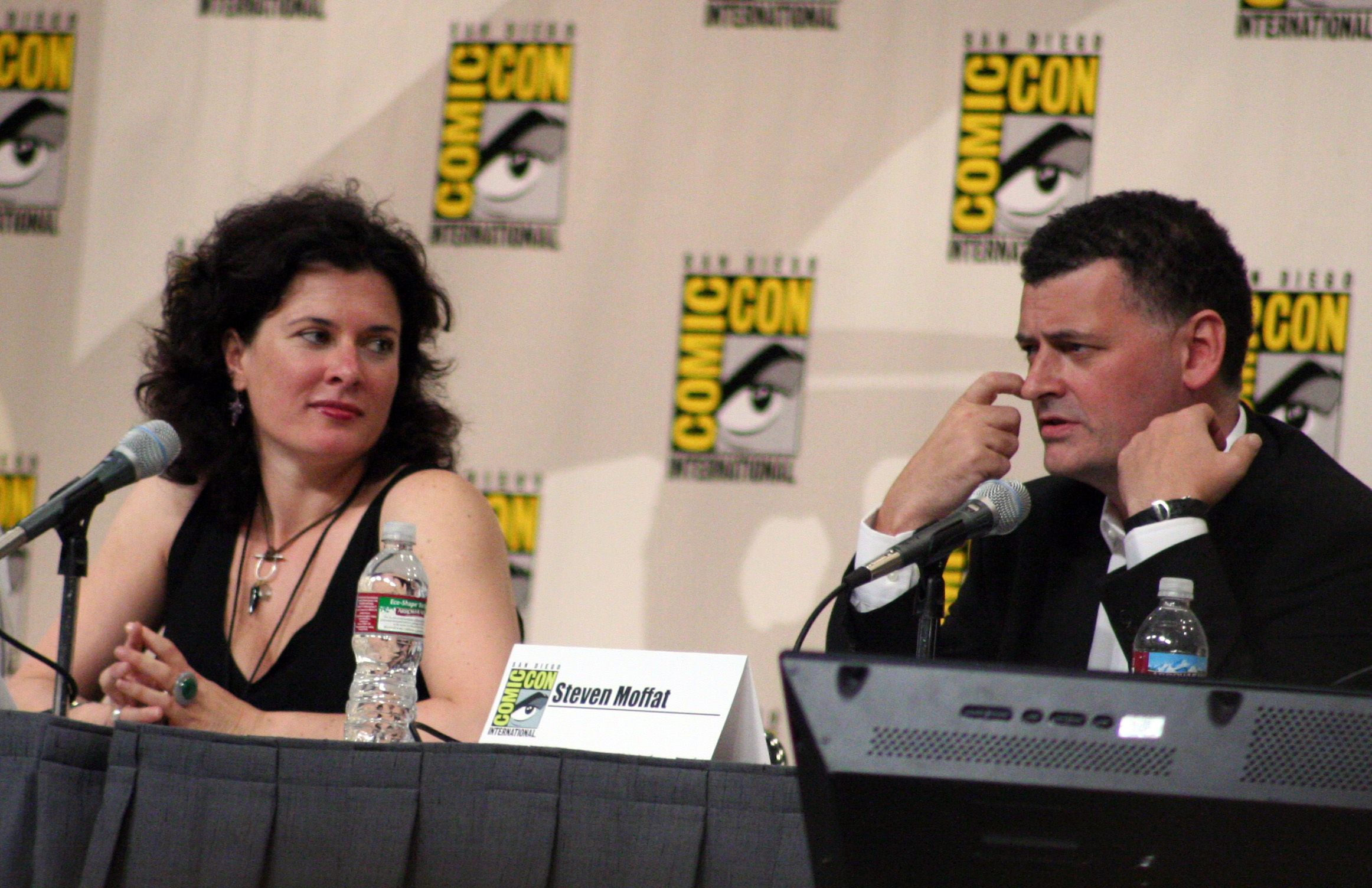
(left to right) Two key members of the production: Broadcasting Press Guild Award nominee Julie Gardner and Steven Moffat.

Year	Category	Nominee(s)	Result	Ref.
2006	Best Drama Series	Phil Collinson, Russell T Davies and Julie Gardner	Nominated	
2006	Best Actor	Christopher Eccleston	Nominated	
2006	Best Actor	David Tennant (also for Casanova and Secret Smile)	Nominated	
2006	Best Actress	Billie Piper (also for ShakespeaRe-Told)	Nominated	
2006	Writer's Award	Russell T Davies	Nominated	
2009	Best Actor	David Tennant (also for Einstein and Eddington)	Nominated	
2010	Best Actor	David Tennant (also for Hamlet)	Nominated	

=== Constellation Awards ===
The Constellation Awards are Science Fiction specialised awards. Doctor Who won three awards in 2007, three in 2008, three in 2009, one in 2010 and one in 2011. David Tennant has been nominated for Best Actor five times, with three wins. In 2010 Murray Gold won Best Technical Accomplishment in Science Fiction Film or Television Series, especially beating Academy Award for Best Visual Effects winner Inception (nominated in the same category as him for its Visual Effects).

Year	Category	Nominee(s)	Result	Ref.
2007	Best Male Performance in a 2006 Science Fiction Television Episode	David Tennant for "The Girl in the Fireplace"	Won	
2007	Best Science Fiction Television Series of 2006	Doctor Who	Won	
2007	Outstanding Canadian Contribution to Science Fiction Film or Television in 2006	Canadian Broadcasting Corporation	Won	
2008	Best Male Performance in a 2007 Science Fiction Television Episode	David Tennant for "The Family of Blood"	Won	
2008	Best Female Performance in a 2007 Science Fiction Television Episode	Carey Mulligan for "Blink"	Won	
2008	Best Science Fiction Television Series of 2007	Doctor Who	Won	
2009	Best Male Performance in a 2008 Science Fiction Television Episode	David Tennant for "Midnight"	Nominated	
2009	Best Female Performance in a 2008 Science Fiction Television Episode	Catherine Tate for "Turn Left"	Won	
2009	Best Science Fiction Television Series of 2008	Doctor Who	Won	
2009	Best Technical Accomplishment in a 2010 Science Fiction Film or Television Series	Murray Gold (for music)	Nominated	
2009	Best Overall 2008 Science Fiction Film or Television Script	Steven Moffat for "Silence in the Library"	Won	
2010	Best Male Performance in a 2009 Science Fiction Television Episode	David Tennant for "The Waters of Mars"	Won	
2010	Best Female Performance in a 2009 Science Fiction Television Episode	Michelle Ryan for "Planet of the Dead"	Nominated	
2010	Best Science Fiction Television Series of 2009	Doctor Who	Nominated	
2011	Best Male Performance in a 2010 Science Fiction Television Episode	David Tennant for "The End of Time: Part Two"	Nominated	
2011	Best Male Performance in a 2010 Science Fiction Television Episode	Matt Smith for "A Christmas Carol"	Nominated	
2011	Best Female Performance in a 2010 Science Fiction Television Episode	Karen Gillan for "Amy's Choice"	Nominated	
2011	Best Science Fiction Television Series of 2010	Doctor Who	Nominated	
2011	Best Technical Accomplishment in a 2010 Science Fiction Film or Television Series	Murray Gold (for music)	Won	
2012	Best Science Fiction Television Series of 2011	Steven Moffat	Nominated	
2013	Best Science Fiction Television Series of 2012	Steven Moffat	Nominated	
2014	Best Male Performance in a 2013 Science Fiction Television Episode	Matt Smith for "The Time of the Doctor"	Nominated	
2014	Best Male Performance in a 2013 Science Fiction Television Episode	John Hurt for "The Day of the Doctor"	Nominated	
2014	Best Female Performance in a 2013 Science Fiction Television Episode	Billie Piper for "The Day of the Doctor"	Nominated	
2014	Best Overall 2013 Science Fiction Film or Television Script	Steven Moffat for "The Day of the Doctor"	Won	

=== Critics' Choice Super Awards ===
The Critics' Choice Super Awards honors superheroes, science fiction/fantasy, horror, action and animation movies and series by the Critics Choice Association

Year	Category	Nominee(s)	Result	Ref.
2021	Best Actress in a Science Fiction/Fantasy Series	Jodie Whittaker	Nominated	
2022	Best Actress in a Science Fiction/Fantasy Series	Jodie Whittaker	Nominated	
2024	Best Science Fiction/Fantasy Series, Limited Series or Made-for-TV Movie	Doctor Who 60th Anniversary Specials	Nominated	
2024	Best Actor in a Science Fiction/Fantasy Series, Limited Series or Made-for-TV Movie	Ncuti Gatwa	Nominated	
2024	Best Villain in a Series, Limited Series or Made-for-TV Movie	Neil Patrick Harris	Nominated	
2025	Best Science Fiction/Fantasy Series, Limited Series or Made-for-TV Movie	Doctor Who	Nominated	
2025	Best Actor in a Science Fiction/Fantasy Series, Limited Series or Made-for-TV Movie	Ncuti Gatwa	Nominated	

=== Critics' Choice Television Awards ===
Year	Category	Nominee(s)	Result	Ref.
2025	Best Actor in a Drama Series	Ncuti Gatwa	Nominated	

=== Diversity in Media Awards ===
Year	Category	Nominee(s)	Result	Ref.
2017	TV Moment of the Year	Doctor Who	Nominated	

=== Edinburgh International Television Festival ===
A panel of journalists and television executives for the annual awards given out at the Edinburgh International Television Festival voted Doctor Who as the best programme of the year in 2007 and 2008.

Year	Category	Nominee(s)	Result	Ref.
2007	Best Programme of the Year	Doctor Who	Won	
2008	Best Programme of the Year	Doctor Who	Won	

=== Emmy Awards ===
==== Primetime Emmy Awards ====
The Primetime Emmy Award is an American accolade bestowed by the Academy of Television Arts & Sciences in recognition of excellence in American primetime television programming since 1949.

Year	Category	Nominee(s)	Result	Ref.
2020	Outstanding Derivative Interactive Program	Doctor Who: The Runaway	Nominated	
2025	Outstanding Choreography for Scripted Programming	Jack Murphy for "There's Always a Twist" (from "The Devil's Chord")	Nominated	

=== GLAAD Media Awards ===
Year	Category	Nominee(s)	Result	Ref.
2024	Outstanding Drama Series	Doctor Who	Nominated	
2026	Outstanding Drama Series	Doctor Who	Nominated	

=== Glamour Awards ===
Year	Category	Nominee(s)	Result	Ref.
2014	UK TV Actress	Jenna Coleman	Won	

=== Glenfiddich Spirit of Scotland Awards ===
In 2007, David Tennant won a Glenfiddich Spirit of Scotland Award, in the Screen Award category.

Year	Category	Nominee(s)	Result	Ref.
2007	Screen Award	David Tennant	Won	

=== Golden Nymphs ===
The Monte-Carlo Television Festival reward every year various television series with its award, the "Golden Nymph".

Year	Category	Nominee(s)	Result	Ref.
2007	Outstanding Actor – Drama Series	David Tennant	Nominated	
2007	Outstanding Actress – Drama Series	Freema Agyeman	Nominated	

=== Hugo Awards ===
In every year from 2006 to 2026 apart from 2022 and 2023, Doctor Who has received at least one nomination for the Short Form category of the Hugo Award for Best Dramatic Presentation, the oldest award for science fiction, winning every year from 2006 until 2012 except 2009 for a total of six awards. The series received a record of three separate nominations each in 2006, 2007, 2010, 2011, 2012 and 2013, and two nominations each in 2008, 2009, 2014, 2019, 2024, and 2025.

Several episodes of the 2005 series of Doctor Who were nominated for the Hugo Award for Best Dramatic Presentation, Short Form: "Dalek", "Father's Day" and the double episode "The Empty Child"/"The Doctor Dances". At a ceremony at the Worldcon (L.A. Con IV) in Los Angeles on 27 August 2006, the Hugo was awarded to "The Empty Child"/"The Doctor Dances". "Dalek" and "Father's Day" came in second and third places respectively. The 2006 series episodes "School Reunion", "Army of Ghosts"/"Doomsday" and "The Girl in the Fireplace" were nominated for the same category of the 2007 Hugo Awards, with "The Girl in the Fireplace" winning.

The 2007 series episodes "Blink" and "Human Nature"/"The Family of Blood" also secured nominations in this category in the 2008 Hugo Awards, with "Blink" winning the award. The 2008 series episodes "Silence in the Library"/"Forest of the Dead" and "Turn Left" secured nominations in this category in the 2009 Hugo awards, but lost to Dr. Horrible's Sing-Along Blog. Three standalone specials from 2008 and 2009 secured nominations in this category in the 2010 Hugo awards: "The Waters of Mars", "The Next Doctor", and "Planet of the Dead", with "The Waters of Mars" winning the award. "Vincent and the Doctor" and "The Pandorica Opens" / "The Big Bang" from the 2010 series, and the 2010 Christmas special "A Christmas Carol" were also nominated in the Short Form category for the 2011 award, and was won by "The Pandorica Opens" / "The Big Bang". Notably, Doctor Who was the only ongoing series nominated in the 2011 competition, with the remainder of the nominees being one-off short films.

"The Doctor's Wife", "A Good Man Goes to War", and "The Girl Who Waited" from the 2011 series were nominated for the 2012 award for Short Form Dramatic Presentation, with "The Doctor's Wife" being the sixth and, as of August 2025, the most recent winner.

"Asylum of the Daleks" and "The Angels Take Manhattan" from the autumn half (Note: Outside the worldwide streaming deal with Disney during the Fourteenth and Fifteenth Doctor eras, Doctor Who was first broadcast and almost entirely produced in the Northern Hemisphere.) of the 2012–2013 series, and 2012 Christmas special "The Snowmen" were nominated for the award in 2013; and "The Name of the Doctor" from the series' spring half and the 50th anniversary special "The Day of the Doctor" were nominated in 2014. They lost to episodes of Game of Thrones.

"Listen" from the 2014 series received a nomination in 2015, losing to Orphan Black episode "By Means Which Have Never Yet Been Tried". "Heaven Sent" from the 2015 series was nominated in 2016, and lost to Jessica Jones episode "AKA Smile". 2016 Christmas special "The Return of Doctor Mysterio" was nominated in 2017, and lost to The Expanse episode "Leviathan Wakes".

2017 Christmas special "Twice Upon a Time" was nominated in 2018; 2019 series episodes "Rosa" and "Demons of the Punjab" were nominated in 2019; 2019 New Year's special "Resolution" was nominated in 2020; and 2020 series episode "Fugitive of the Judoon" was nominated in 2021. They lost to episodes of The Good Place.

60th anniversary specials "Wild Blue Yonder" and "The Giggle" were nominated in 2024, and lost to The Last of Us episode "Long, Long Time", directed by Peter Hoar, a director of the 2025 series of Doctor Who, and a prior nominee for the same award for the 2011 series episode "A Good Man Goes to War". 2024 series episodes "73 Yards" and "Dot and Bubble" were nominated in 2025, losing to the Star Trek: Lower Decks episode "The New Next Generation". 2025 series episode "The Story & the Engine" was nominated in 2026.

Year	Category	Nominee(s)	Result	Ref.
2006	Best Dramatic Presentation, Short Form	Robert Shearman and Joe Ahearne for "Dalek"	Nominated	
2006	Best Dramatic Presentation, Short Form	Paul Cornell and Joe Ahearne for "Father's Day"	Nominated	
2006	Best Dramatic Presentation, Short Form	Steven Moffat and James Hawes for "The Empty Child"/"The Doctor Dances"	Won	
2007	Best Dramatic Presentation, Short Form	Toby Whithouse and James Hawes for "School Reunion"	Nominated	
2007	Best Dramatic Presentation, Short Form	Steven Moffat and Euros Lyn for "The Girl in the Fireplace"	Won	
2007	Best Dramatic Presentation, Short Form	Russell T Davies and Graeme Harper for "Army of Ghosts"/"Doomsday"	Nominated	
2008	Best Dramatic Presentation, Short Form	Paul Cornell and Charles Palmer for "Human Nature"/"The Family of Blood"	Nominated	
2008	Best Dramatic Presentation, Short Form	Steven Moffat and Hettie MacDonald for "Blink"	Won	
2009	Best Dramatic Presentation, Short Form	Steven Moffat and Euros Lyn for "Silence in the Library"/"Forest of the Dead"	Nominated	
2009	Best Dramatic Presentation, Short Form	Russell T Davies and Graeme Harper for "Turn Left"	Nominated	
2010	Best Dramatic Presentation, Short Form	Russell T Davies and Andy Goddard for "The Next Doctor"	Nominated	
2010	Best Dramatic Presentation, Short Form	Russell T Davies, Gareth Roberts and James Strong for "Planet of the Dead"	Nominated	
2010	Best Dramatic Presentation, Short Form	Russell T Davies, Phil Ford and Graeme Harper for "The Waters of Mars"	Won	
2011	Best Dramatic Presentation, Short Form	Richard Curtis and Jonny Campbell for "Vincent and the Doctor"	Nominated	
2011	Best Dramatic Presentation, Short Form	Steven Moffat and Toby Haynes for "The Pandorica Opens"/"The Big Bang"	Won	
2011	Best Dramatic Presentation, Short Form	Steven Moffat and Toby Haynes for "A Christmas Carol"	Nominated	
2012	Best Dramatic Presentation, Short Form	Neil Gaiman and Richard Clark for "The Doctor's Wife"	Won	
2012	Best Dramatic Presentation, Short Form	Tom MacRae and Nick Hurran for "The Girl Who Waited"	Nominated	
2012	Best Dramatic Presentation, Short Form	Steven Moffat and Peter Hoar for "A Good Man Goes to War"	Nominated	
2013	Best Dramatic Presentation, Short Form	Steven Moffat and Nick Hurran for "Asylum of the Daleks"	Nominated	
2013	Best Dramatic Presentation, Short Form	Steven Moffat and Nick Hurran for "The Angels Take Manhattan"	Nominated	
2013	Best Dramatic Presentation, Short Form	Steven Moffat and Saul Metzstein for "The Snowmen"	Nominated	
2014	Best Dramatic Presentation, Short Form	Steven Moffat and Saul Metzstein for "The Name of the Doctor"	Nominated	
2014	Best Dramatic Presentation, Short Form	Steven Moffat and Nick Hurran for "The Day of the Doctor"	Nominated	
2015	Best Dramatic Presentation, Short Form	Steven Moffat and Douglas Mackinnon for "Listen"	Nominated	
2016	Best Dramatic Presentation, Short Form	Steven Moffat and Rachel Talalay for "Heaven Sent"	Nominated	
2017	Best Dramatic Presentation, Short Form	Steven Moffat and Ed Bazalgette for "The Return of Doctor Mysterio"	Nominated	
2018	Best Dramatic Presentation, Short Form	Steven Moffat and Rachel Talalay for "Twice Upon a Time"	Nominated	
2019	Best Dramatic Presentation, Short Form	Malorie Blackman, Chris Chibnall, and Mark Tonderai for "Rosa"	Nominated	
2019	Best Dramatic Presentation, Short Form	Vinay Patel and Jamie Childs for "Demons of the Punjab"	Nominated	
2020	Best Dramatic Presentation, Short Form	Chris Chibnall and Wayne Yip for "Resolution"	Nominated	
2021	Best Dramatic Presentation, Short Form	Vinay Patel, Chris Chibnall, and Nida Manzoor for "Fugitive of the Judoon"	Nominated	
2024	Best Dramatic Presentation, Short Form	Russell T Davies and Tom Kingsley for "Wild Blue Yonder"	Nominated	
2024	Best Dramatic Presentation, Short Form	Russell T Davies and Chanya Button for "The Giggle"	Nominated	
2025	Best Dramatic Presentation, Short Form	Russell T Davies and Dylan Holmes Williams for "73 Yards"	Nominated	
2025	Best Dramatic Presentation, Short Form	Russell T Davies and Dylan Holmes Williams for "Dot and Bubble"	Nominated	
2026	Best Dramatic Presentation, Short Form	Inua Ellams and Makalla McPherson for "The Story & the Engine"	Nominated	

=== IGN Best of Television Awards ===
In 2011 Doctor Who was nominated by IGN for Best Sci-Fi/Horror Series. American Horror Story won the award.

Year	Category	Nominee(s)	Result	Ref.
2011	Best Sci-Fi/Horror Series	Doctor Who	Nominated	
2012	Best Sci-Fi/Horror Series	Doctor Who	Nominated	
2013	Best Sci-Fi/Horror Series	Doctor Who	Nominated	
2013	Best Sci-Fi/Horror Series – People's Choice	Doctor Who	Won	
2014	Best Sci-Fi/Horror Series	Doctor Who	Nominated	
2014	Best Sci-Fi/Horror Series – People's Choice	Doctor Who	Won	
2015	Best Sci-Fi/Horror Series	Doctor Who	Nominated	
2015	Best Sci-Fi/Horror Series – People's Choice	Doctor Who	Nominated	

=== National Television Awards ===
The National Television Awards are the most prominent ceremony for which the results are voted on by the general public.

The revived series have been very popular: every year from 2005 to 2010, it won the Most Popular Drama Award and the actor who played The Doctor won the Best Actor Award (name variable, depending on the year), once for Eccleston and four for Tennant. Three actress who played the Doctor's main companion have been nominated: Piper won Best Actress in 2005 and 2006, Agyeman was nominated for Best Actress in 2007, and Tate was nominated for Outstanding Drama Performance in 2008 but lost due to Tennant's victory on the same category.

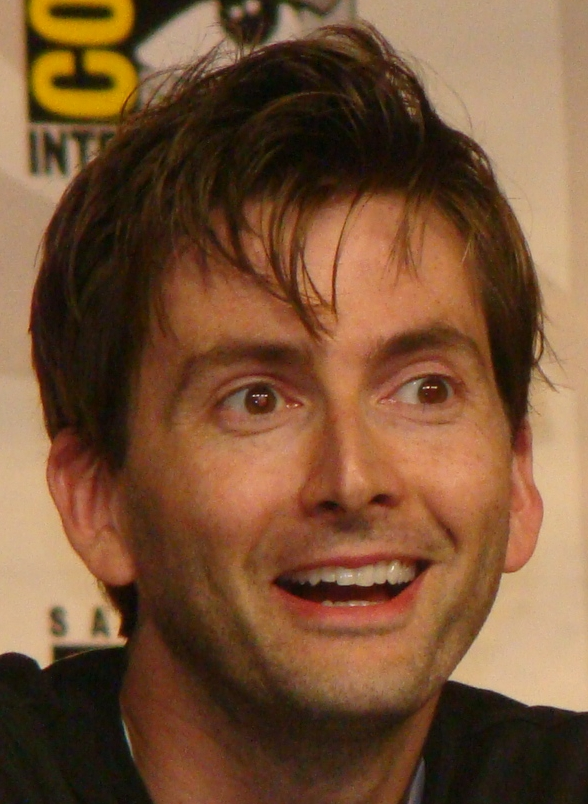
David Tennant was very popular at the National Television Awards, winning the male acting award of the ceremony every year during his time as the Tenth Doctor (2006 to 2010, no ceremony in 2009).

2011 was the first year without win for the revival series: it was nominated once again for Most Popular Drama, and Matt Smith was nominated for Most Popular Drama Performance. When the Most Popular Drama Performance Award was split the following year, Smith won Male and Karen Gillan won Female.

2019 saw the return of Doctor Who to the shortlisted nominations list of the National Television Awards for the first time since 2016 when it was nominated for Most Popular Drama Series. Both Jodie Whittaker and the series were nominated in the shortlist.

Year	Category	Nominee(s)	Result	Ref.
2005	Most Popular Drama	Doctor Who	Won	
2005	Most Popular Actor	Christopher Eccleston	Won	
2005	Most Popular Actress	Billie Piper	Won	
2006	Most Popular Drama	Doctor Who	Won	
2006	Most Popular Actor	David Tennant	Won	
2006	Most Popular Actress	Billie Piper	Won	
2007	Most Popular Drama	Doctor Who	Won	
2007	Most Popular Actor	David Tennant	Won	
2007	Most Popular Actress	Freema Agyeman	Nominated	
2008	Most Popular Drama	Doctor Who	Won	
2008	Outstanding Drama Performance	David Tennant	Won	
2008	Outstanding Drama Performance	Catherine Tate	Nominated	
2010	Most Popular Drama	Doctor Who	Won	
2010	Most Popular Drama Performance	David Tennant	Won	
2011	Most Popular Drama	Doctor Who	Nominated	
2011	Most Popular Drama Performance	Matt Smith	Nominated	
2012	Most Popular Drama	Doctor Who	Nominated	
2012	Most Popular Drama Performance: Male	Matt Smith	Won	
2012	Most Popular Drama Performance: Female	Karen Gillan	Won	
2013	Most Popular Drama	Doctor Who	Nominated	
2013	Outstanding Drama Performance (Male)	Matt Smith	Nominated	
2013	Outstanding Drama Performance (Female)	Karen Gillan	Nominated	
2014	Most Popular Drama	Doctor Who	Won	
2014	Outstanding Drama Performance	Matt Smith	Won	
2015	Most Popular Drama	Doctor Who	Nominated	
2016	Most Popular Drama	Doctor Who	Nominated	
2019	Most Popular Drama	Doctor Who	Nominated	
2019	Outstanding Drama Performance	Jodie Whittaker	Nominated	

=== Nebula/Ray Bradbury Awards ===
The Nebula Awards are presented by the Science Fiction and Fantasy Writers of America. Doctor Who received two nominations in the Best Script category, but lost it to Hayao Miyazaki's Howl's Moving Castle and Guillermo del Toro's Pan's Labyrinth respectively. In 2009 the award was replaced by the Ray Bradbury Award in which Doctor Who was nominated in 2011, 2012, 2014, and 2025 and won in 2012.

In 2025, Doctor Who was nominated again for the Ray Bradbury Award for the episode "Dot and Bubble". It lost to the film Dune: Part Two, adapted by Denis Villeneuve and Jon Spaihts.

Year	Category	Nominee(s)	Result	Ref.
2007	Best Script	Steven Moffat for "The Girl in the Fireplace"	Nominated	
2008	Best Script	Steven Moffat for "Blink"	Nominated	
2011	Ray Bradbury Award for Outstanding Dramatic Presentation (Note: Renamed Ray Bradbury Nebula Award for Outstanding Dramatic Presentation in 2019.)	Richard Curtis and Jonny Campbell for "Vincent and the Doctor"	Nominated	
2012	Ray Bradbury Award for Outstanding Dramatic Presentation	Neil Gaiman and Richard Clark for "The Doctor's Wife"	Won	
2014	Ray Bradbury Award for Outstanding Dramatic Presentation	Nick Hurran and Steven Moffat for "The Day of the Doctor"	Nominated	
2025	Ray Bradbury Award for Outstanding Dramatic Presentation	Russell T Davies for "Dot and Bubble"	Nominated	

=== Nickelodeon Kid's Choice Awards ===
Every year, Nickelodeon screens an awards show where, as the name depicts, kids vote for their favourites in each category. Doctor Who was nominated in 2012 and 2013 in the Best UK Show category but lost to The X Factor and House of Anubis respectively.

Year	Category	Nominee(s)	Result	Ref.
2012	Best UK TV Show	Doctor Who	Nominated	
2013	Best UK TV Show	Doctor Who	Nominated	

=== Peabody Award ===
In 2013, BBC Wales was awarded an Institutional Peabody Award for Doctor Who. The award is granted for "excellence in its own terms" to television, radio and electronic media. The award's website praised Doctor Who as follows: "Seemingly immortal, 50-years-old and still running, this engaging, imaginative sci-fi/fantasy series is awarded an Institutional Peabody for evolving with technology and the times like nothing else in the known television universe."

=== People's Choice Awards ===
In 2008 the show received a nomination for the People's Choice Awards, where results are voted online by general public. Doctor Who was nominated for Favorite Sci Fi/Fantasy Show in 2005 but lost in to Stargate Atlantis. The PCA nomination marked the first time a mainstream popular, non-niche American award had recognized the series.

Year	Category	Nominee(s)	Result	Ref.
2008	Favorite Sci Fi/Fantasy Show	Doctor Who	Nominated	
2012	Favorite Sci Fi/Fantasy Show	Doctor Who	Nominated	
2014	Favorite Sci Fi/Fantasy Show	Doctor Who	Nominated	
2018	The Sci-Fi/Fantasy Show of 2018	Doctor Who	Nominated	

=== PinkNews Awards ===
Year	Category	Nominee(s)	Result	Ref.
2017	Ally Award for LGBT inclusiveness	Doctor Who	Won	

=== Rockie Awards ===
The Rockie Awards are presented by the Banff World Media Festival, a Canadian event, ever since at least 2016.

Year	Category	Nominee(s)	Result	Ref.
2019	Best Scifi and Genre-based series	Doctor Who	Won	

=== RTS Television Awards ===
The Royal Television Society's annual awards are decided by balanced juries of media professionals, with separate juries for individual categories within each of the six groups of Awards. The group of awards for which Doctor Who was nominated were the Television Awards.

In 1974, the RTS Television Awards gave to Doctor Who the first award in its history. Its only other victory was on 2008, 34 years later. The series was nominated three times for Best Drama Series, but never won.

Year	Category	Nominee(s)	Result	Ref.
1974	Best Graphics	Bernard Lodge	Won	
2005	Best Costume Design – Drama	Lucinda Wright	Nominated	
2005	Best Make Up Design – Drama	Davy Jones and Neill Gorton	Nominated	
2006	Best Drama Series	Doctor Who	Nominated	
2006	Best Production Design	Edward Thomas	Nominated	
2006	Best Costume Design – Drama	Louise Page	Nominated	
2006	Best Make Up Design – Drama	Sheelagh Wells and Neill Gorton	Nominated	
2006	Best Visual Effects – Digital Effects	The Mill	Nominated	
2008	Best Drama Series	Doctor Who	Nominated	
2008	Best Actor – Male	David Tennant (also for Recovery)	Nominated	
2008	Best Sound – Drama	Julian Howarth, Tim Ricketts, Paul McFadden and Paul Jefferies for "Midnight"	Won	
2010	Best Production Design – Drama	Edward Thomas for "The Pandorica Opens"	Nominated	
2011	Best Writer – Drama	Steven Moffat for Series 6	Nominated	
2011	Lifetime Achievement Award	Beryl Vertue	Won	
2016	Best Effects – Special	Real SFX & Millennium FX for Series 9	Nominated	

=== Satellite Awards ===
Satellite Awards are presented by the International Press Academy. David Tennant received a nomination in 2008, while the series and Jodie Whittaker were nominated for two categories in 2018.

Year	Category	Nominee(s)	Result	Ref.
2008	Best Actor – Television Series Drama	David Tennant	Nominated	
2018	Best Television Series, Genre	Doctor Who	Nominated	
2018	Best Actress in a Series, Drama/Genre	Jodie Whittaker	Nominated	

=== Saturn Awards ===
The Saturn Awards, annually presented by the Academy of Science Fiction, Fantasy and Horror Films since 1972, are the second oldest awards to honor science fiction, fantasy and horror (after the Hugo Awards). However it only began to reward series in 1989, after Doctor Who's original run. The series has been nominated for 20 awards between 2007 and 2019, winning the only Best International Series Award (defeating its spin-off Torchwood) in 2008 and Best Television Presentation for the Christmas special "The Husbands of River Song" in 2016.

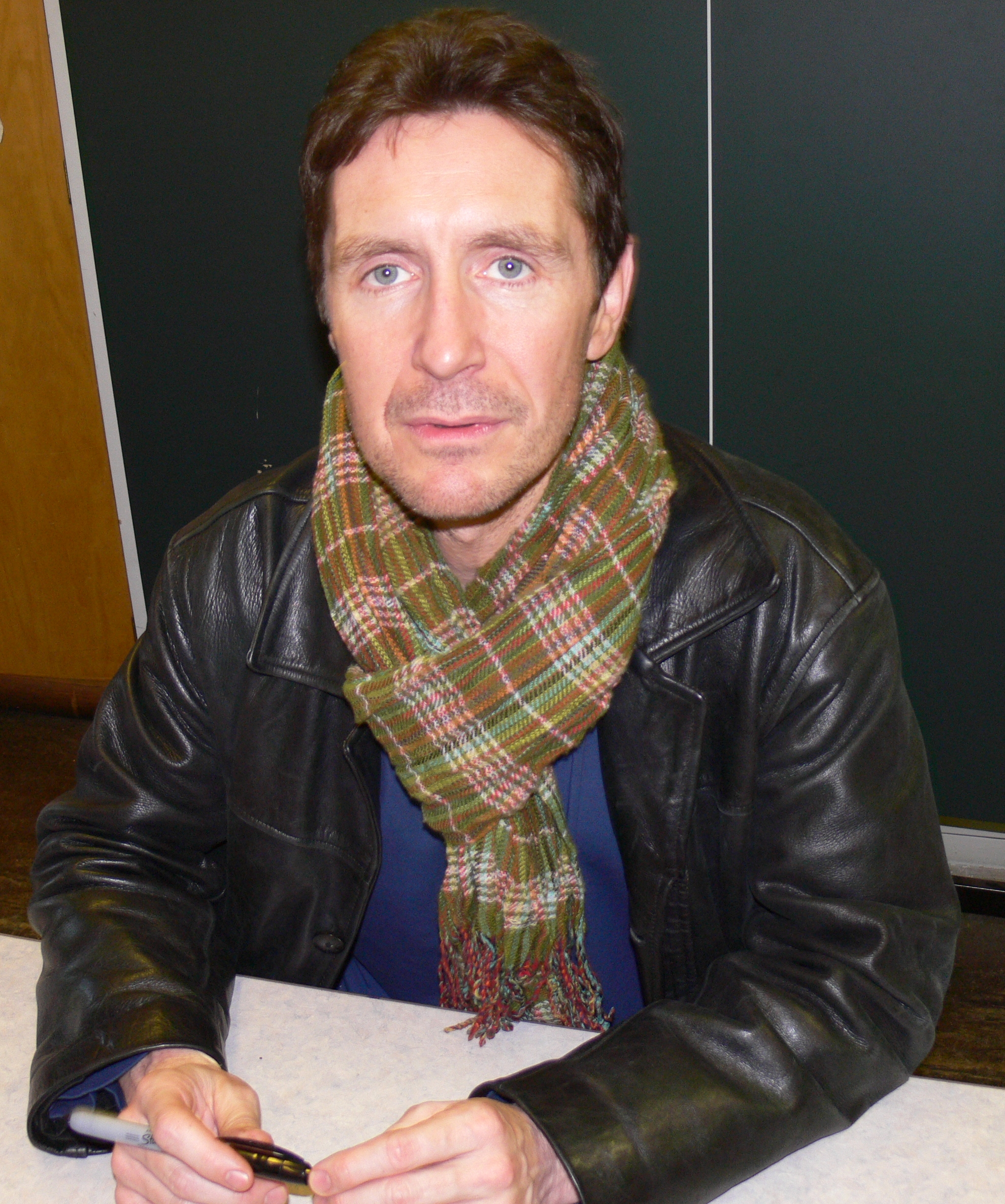
Paul McGann's Saturn Award nomination for playing the Eighth Doctor in the 1996 film made him the first actor in history to be nominated for an award for playing the Doctor.

The 1996 Doctor Who television movie won Best Television Presentation, one of the only four awards received by the franchise prior to its revival in 2005. McGann was nominated for Best Actor.

Year	Category	Nominee(s)	Result	Ref.
1996	Best Single Genre Television Presentation	Doctor Who (1996 film)	Won	
1996	Best Actor on Television	Paul McGann	Nominated	
2007	Best Syndicated/Cable Television Series	Doctor Who	Nominated	
2007	Best Television DVD Release	Doctor Who: The Complete Second Series	Nominated	
2008	Best International Series	Doctor Who	Won	
2010	Best Television Presentation	"The End of Time"	Nominated	
2010	Best Actor on Television	David Tennant	Nominated	
2010	Best Guest Starring Role in Television	Bernard Cribbins	Nominated	
2011	Best Television Presentation	Doctor Who	Nominated	
2012	Best Youth-Oriented Television Series	Doctor Who	Nominated	
2013	Best Youth-Oriented Television Series	Doctor Who	Nominated	
2015	Best Youth-Oriented Television Series	Doctor Who	Nominated	
2015	Best Supporting Actress on Television	Jenna Coleman	Nominated	
2016	Best Science Fiction Television Series	Doctor Who	Nominated	
2016	Best Television Presentation	"The Husbands of River Song"	Won	
2016	Best Guest Starring Role on Television	Alex Kingston	Nominated	
2017	Best Television Presentation	"The Return of Doctor Mysterio"	Nominated	
2018	Best Science Fiction Television Series	Doctor Who	Nominated	
2018	Best Television Presentation	"Twice Upon a Time"	Nominated	
2019	Best Science Fiction Television Series	Doctor Who	Nominated	
2019	Best Actress on a Television Series	Jodie Whittaker	Nominated	
2019	Best Performance by a Younger Actor on a Television Series	Tosin Cole	Nominated	
2020	Best Science Fiction Television Series	Doctor Who	Nominated	
2022	Best Fantasy Series: Network or Cable	Doctor Who	Nominated	

=== Scream Awards ===
The Scream Awards are dedicated to the horror, sci-fi, and fantasy genres of feature films and series. Winners are elected by fans among pre-selectioned nominees via online.

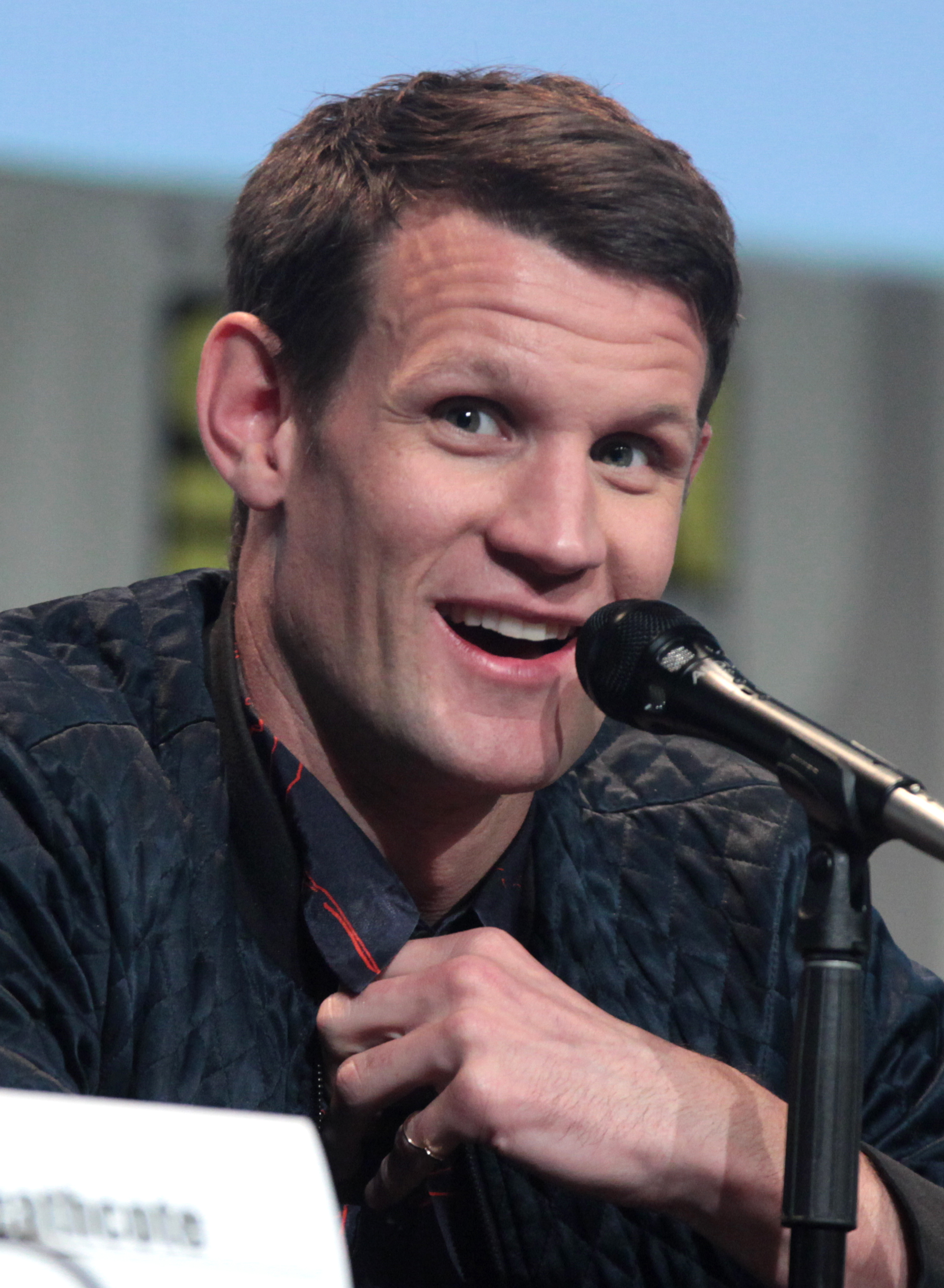
Matt Smith (Eleventh Doctor) won the Scream Award for Best Actor in 2011.

Year	Category	Nominee(s)	Result	Ref.
2006	Best TV Show	Doctor Who	Nominated	
2007	Best TV Show	Doctor Who	Nominated	
2008	Best Science Fiction Actor	David Tennant	Nominated	
2010	Best TV Show	Doctor Who	Nominated	
2011	Best TV Show	Doctor Who	Nominated	
2011	Best Science Fiction Actress	Karen Gillan	Nominated	
2011	Best Science Fiction Actor	Matt Smith	Won	

=== Scribe Awards ===
Year	Category	Nominee(s)	Result	Ref.
2012	Best Audio	Doctor Who: The Many Deaths of Jo Grant	Nominated	
2013	Best Audio	Doctor Who: Project: Nirvana	Nominated	
2015	Best Audio	Doctor Who: Iterations of I	Won	
2016	Best Audio	Doctor Who: The Red Lady	Won	
2016	Best Audio	Doctor Who: Damaged Goods	Nominated	
2017	Best Audio	Doctor Who: The Mouthless Dead	Nominated	
2018	Best Audio	Doctor Who: Across the Darkened City	Nominated	
2018	Best Audio	Doctor Who: Cold Vengeance	Nominated	
2019	Best Audio	Doctor Who: The Calendar Man	Won	
2019	Best Audio	Doctor Who: The Invention of Death	Nominated	
2019	Best Audio	The War Master: The Master of Callous	Nominated	
2020	Best Audio	Doctor Who: The Creeping Death	Won	
2020	Best Audio	Doctor Who: Daybreak	Nominated	
2020	Best Audio	The Diary of River Song: Concealed Weapon	Nominated	
2021	Best Audio	Doctor Who: Out of Time	Won	
2021	Best Audio	Doctor Who: The Enemy of My Enemy	Nominated	
2021	Best Audio	Doctor Who: He Kills Me, He Kills Me Not	Nominated	
2021	Best Audio	Doctor Who: The Curse of Lady Macbeth	Won	
2021	Best Audio	Doctor Who: The Lost Resort	Nominated	
2021	Best Audio	Doctor Who: Girl, Deconstructed	Nominated	
2021	Best Audio	Doctor Who: Monsters in Metropolis	Nominated	
2021	Best Audio	Doctor Who: The Truth of Peladon	Nominated	
2021	Best Audio	Doctor Who: The Annihilators	Nominated	

=== Seoul International Drama Awards ===
In 2009, the Seoul International Drama Award from South Korea honoured Doctor Who with the Award for Most Popular Foreign Drama of Year.

Year	Category	Nominee(s)	Result	Ref.
2009	Most Popular Foreign Drama of the Year	Doctor Who	Won	

=== SFX Awards ===
At the SFX Awards, presented by the eponymous science fiction/fantasy magazine, Doctor Who won every category it was nominated for from 2005 to 2008 included. Currently, every actor nominated for an award won it (except Tennant, who lost Best Actor to Smith in 2011). Dervla Kirwan was also nominated for Actress in 2010. The series won five times for Best TV Show, three for Best TV Episode (with eight nominations overall), five each for Best Actor and Best Actress (Note: Before 2010, the categories were split into TV Actor, Film Actor, TV Actress, and Film Actress). It received a triple nomination for Best TV Episode in 2007, a double nomination in the same category in 2010, a double nomination for Best Actor in 2011, and a triple nomination for Best Actress and Sexiest Woman in 2012 (for the same three women), with Alex Kingston winning Best Actress and Suranne Jones winning Sexiest Woman.

In 2005, the series came first in a survey by SFX magazine of "The Greatest UK Science Fiction and Fantasy Television Series Ever".

Year	Category	Nominee(s)	Result	Ref.
2005	Best TV Show	Doctor Who	Won	
2005	Best TV Episode	Joe Ahearne and Russell T Davies for "The Parting of the Ways"	Won	
2005	Best TV Actor	Christopher Eccleston	Won	
2005	Best TV Actress	Billie Piper	Won	
2007	Best TV Show	Doctor Who	Won	
2007	Best TV Episode	Euros Lyn and Steven Moffat for "The Girl in the Fireplace"	Won	
2007	Best TV Episode	James Strong and Matt Jones for "The Impossible Planet"/"The Satan Pit"	Nominated	
2007	Best TV Episode	Graeme Harper and Russell T Davies for "Army of Ghosts"/"Doomsday"	Nominated	
2007	Best TV Actor	David Tennant	Won	
2007	Best TV Actress	Billie Piper	Won	
2008	Best TV Show	Russell T Davies	Won	
2008	Best TV Episode	Russell T Davies for "The Stolen Earth"/"Journey's End"	Won	
2008	Best TV Episode	Russell T Davies for "Midnight"	Nominated	
2008	Best TV Episode	Russell T Davies for "Turn Left"	Nominated	
2008	Best TV Episode	Steven Moffat for "Silence in the Library"/"Forest of the Dead"	Nominated	
2008	Best TV Actor	David Tennant	Won	
2008	Sexiest Man	David Tennant	Won	
2008	Best TV Actress	Catherine Tate	Won	
2008	Sexiest Woman	Catherine Tate	Nominated	
2008	Sexiest Woman	Billie Piper	Nominated	
2008	Sexiest Woman	Freema Agyeman	Nominated	
2010	Best TV Show	Doctor Who	Nominated	
2010	Best TV Episode	Russell T Davies for "The Next Doctor"	Nominated	
2010	Best TV Episode	Russell T Davies and Gareth Roberts for "Planet of the Dead"	Nominated	
2010	Best Actor	David Tennant	Won	
2010	Best Actress	Dervla Kirwan for "The Next Doctor"	Nominated	
2010	Best Monster/Villain	Miss Hartigan (from "The Next Doctor")	Nominated	
2010	Best Special FX	Killer Flying Stingrays (from "Planet of the Dead")	Won	
2010	Hope for the Future	Steven Moffat (for taking over as showrunner)	Won	
2010	Best Gadget	Sonic screwdriver	Won	
2011	Best TV Show	Steven Moffat	Won	
2011	Best TV Episode	Jonny Campbell and Richard Curtis for "Vincent and the Doctor"	Nominated	
2011	Best TV Actor	David Tennant	Nominated	
2011	Best TV Actor	Matt Smith	Won	
2011	Best TV Actress	Karen Gillan	Won	
2012	Best TV Show	Doctor Who	Won	
2012	Best Actor	Matt Smith	Won	
2012	Sexiest Man	Matt Smith	Nominated	
2012	Best Actress	Karen Gillan	Nominated	
2012	Best Actress	Alex Kingston	Won	
2012	Best Actress	Suranne Jones (from "The Doctor's Wife")	Nominated	
2012	Sexiest Woman	Suranne Jones (from "The Doctor's Wife")	Won	
2012	Sexiest Woman	Karen Gillan	Nominated	
2012	Sexiest Woman	Alex Kingston	Nominated	
2012	Screenwriting Excellence	Neil Gaiman for "The Doctor's Wife"	Won	
2012	Best Special Effect	The opening sequence of "A Good Man Goes to War"	Won	
2012	Best Villain	The Silence	Won	
2012	Best Collectible/Toy	Doctor Who Character Building TARDIS Mini-set	Won	

=== Sunday Herald Culture Awards ===
Year	Category	Nominee(s)	Result	Ref.
2018	Best Actor – Television	Peter Capaldi for "Twice Upon a Time"	Won	

=== TV Quick Awards ===
The TV Quick Awards (or TV Choice Awards) are awarded every year by the British magazine TV Choice.

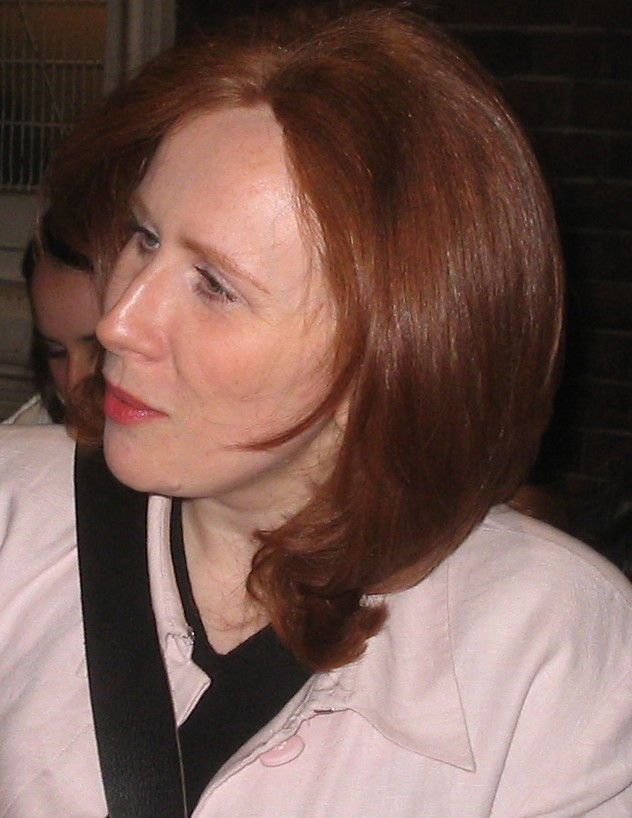
Catherine Tate (Donna Noble) won a TV Quick Award for Best Actress in 2008, her only year as a regular in the series.

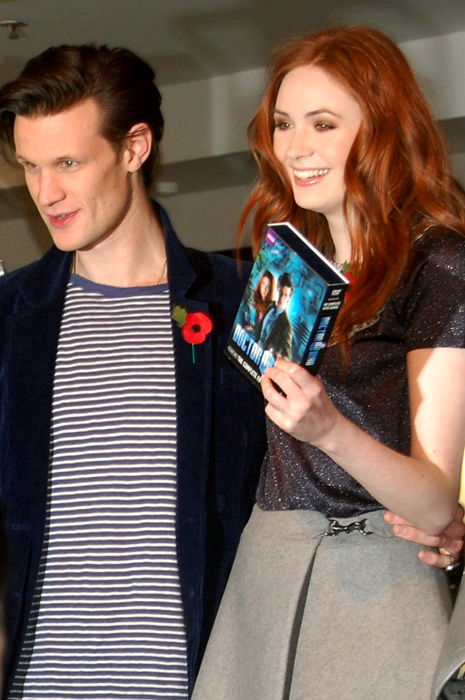
Matt Smith (Eleventh Doctor) and Karen Gillan (Amy Pond) were both nominated for TV Quick Awards in 2010 and 2011.

Doctor Who won Best Loved Drama, later changed to Best Family Drama, every time since 2005. The actor who played the Doctor and the actress who played his main companion during a series was nominated every year since 2005: Best Actor had been won one time by Eccleston and three times by Tennant, and Best Actress had been won once by Piper, once by Tate and once by Gillan.

Year	Category	Nominee(s)	Result	Ref.
2005	Best Actor	Christopher Eccleston	Won	
2006	Best Loved Drama	Russell T Davies, Phil Collinson and Julie Gardner (double win)	Won	
2006	Best Loved Drama	Russell T Davies, Phil Collinson and Julie Gardner (double win)	Won	
2006	Best Actor	David Tennant	Won	
2006	Best Actress	Billie Piper	Won	
2007	Best Loved Drama	Doctor Who	Won	
2007	Best Actor	David Tennant	Won	
2007	Best Actress	Freema Agyeman	Nominated	
2008	Best Loved Drama	Doctor Who	Won	
2008	Best Actor	David Tennant	Won	
2008	Best Actress	Catherine Tate	Won	
2010	Best Family Drama	Steven Moffat	Won	
2010	Best Actor	Matt Smith	Nominated	
2010	Best Actress	Karen Gillan	Nominated	
2011	Best Family Drama	Steven Moffat	Won	
2011	Best Actor	Matt Smith	Nominated	
2011	Best Actress	Karen Gillan	Won	
2012	Best Family Drama	Doctor Who	Won	
2012	Best Actor	Matt Smith	Nominated	
2012	Best Actress	Karen Gillan	Nominated	
2013	Best Drama Series	Doctor Who	Won	
2013	Best Actor	Matt Smith	Nominated	
2013	Best Actress	Jenna Coleman	Nominated	
2013	Outstanding Contribution Award	Doctor Who	Won	
2015	Best Family Drama	Doctor Who	Nominated	
2015	Best Actor	Peter Capaldi	Nominated	
2015	Best Actress	Jenna Coleman	Nominated	
2016	Best Family Drama	Doctor Who	Nominated	
2016	Best Actor	Peter Capaldi	Nominated	
2019	Best Family Drama	Doctor Who	Nominated	
2019	Best Actress	Jodie Whittaker	Nominated	
2020	Best Family Drama	Doctor Who	Nominated	
2022	Best Family Drama	Doctor Who	Nominated	

=== TV Times Awards ===
Year	Category	Nominee(s)	Result	Ref.
2017	Favourite Newcomer	Pearl Mackie	Nominated	

=== TRIC Awards ===
The TRIC Awards are annually presented by the Television and Radio Industries Club.

Year	Category	Nominee(s)	Result	Ref.
2006	New TV Talent (also for ShakespeaRe-Told)	Billie Piper	Won	
2007	TV Drama Programme	Russell T Davies, Phil Collinson and Julie Gardner	Nominated	
2008	TV Drama Programme	Russell T Davies	Nominated	
2010	TV Drama Programme	Russell T Davies	Won	
2014	HD Drama Programme of the Year		Won	

=== VES Awards ===
At the Visual Effects Society Awards, Doctor Who won one award out of six.

Year	Category	Nominee(s)	Result	Ref.
2007	Outstanding Animated Character in a Live Action Broadcast Program, Commercial or Music Video	Nicolas Hernandez, Jean-Claude Deguara, Neil Roche and Jean-Yves Audouard (for the werewolf) for "Tooth and Claw"	Nominated	
2008	Outstanding Visual Effects in a Broadcast Miniseries, Movie or Special	David Houghton, Will Cohen, Nicolas Hernandez and Sara Bennett for "Voyage of the Damned"	Nominated	
2008	Outstanding Visual Effects in a Broadcast Series	David Houghton, Will Cohen, Jean-Claude Deguara and Nicolas Hernandez for "Last of the Time Lords"	Nominated	
2008	Outstanding Animated Character in a Live Action Broadcast Program or Commercial	Nicolas Hernandez, Adam Burnett, Neil Roche and Jean-Claude Deguara (for the 900-year-old Doctor) for "Last of the Time Lords"	Nominated	
2009	Outstanding Visual Effects in a Broadcast Miniseries, Movie or Special	Dave Houghton, Marie Jones, Matthew McKinney, Murray Barber for "The Next Doctor"	Nominated	
2009	Outstanding Matte Paintings in a Broadcast Program or Commercial	Simon Wicker, Charlie Bennett, Tim Barter, Arianna Lago for "Silence in the Library"	Won	

=== Visionary Arts Organisation Award ===
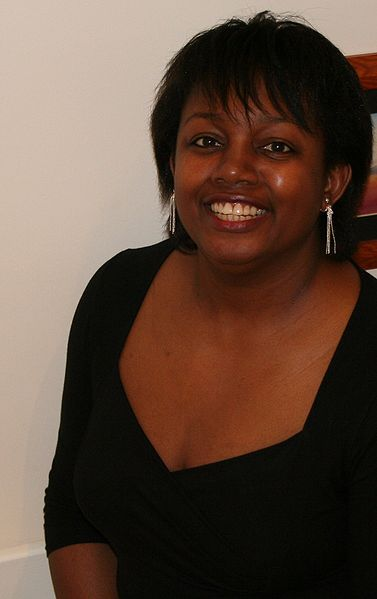
Malorie Blackman, a first time writer for the show, co-wrote Rosa with Chris Chibnall

The episode Rosa won the Visionary Arts Organisation Award for Television Show of the Year at the BAFTA in London.

Year	Category	Nominee(s)	Result	Ref.
2019	Television Show of the Year	Malorie Blackman, Chris Chibnall for "Rosa"	Won	

=== Writers' Guild of Great Britain ===
Every year the Writers' Guild of Great Britain honours the best writing. The series have been nominated five time: one in 1975, and four times for the revived series. Steven Moffat have been nominated three times overall, winning one.

Year	Category	Nominee(s)	Result	Ref.
1975	Best Children's Drama Script	Robert Holmes, Malcolm Hulke, Terry Nation, Brian Hayles and Robert Sloman	Won	
2007	Best Soap/Series	Chris Chibnall, Paul Cornell, Russell T Davies, Stephen Greenhorn, Steven Moffat, Helen Raynor and Gareth Roberts	Won	
2009	Best Television Drama Series	Gareth Roberts, Russell T Davies and Phil Ford	Nominated	
2010	Best Television Drama Series	Simon Nye, Chris Chibnall, Mark Gatiss, Toby Whithouse and Steven Moffat	Nominated	
2011	Best Television Drama Series	Stephen Thompson, Steven Moffat, Gareth Roberts, Richard Curtis, Neil Gaiman and Matthew Graham	Nominated	

== Bibliography ==
- Bradley, Dave, ed. (18 December 2008). "SFX Reader Awards 2008". SFX. No. 178. Bath, Somerset: Future Publishing. pp. 93–100.
- Bradley, Dave, ed. (February 2010). "SFX Sci-Fi Awards 2010 in association with Play.com". SFX. No. 193. Bath, Somerset: Future Publishing. pp. 95–101.
- Bradley, Dave, ed. (8 February 2012). "SFX Sci-Fi Awards 2012". SFX. No. 219. Bath, Somerset: Future Publishing. pp. 90–97.
