= The 411 =

British girl group

- Also known as: Sunshyne
- Origin: London, England
- Genres: Pop; R&B
- Years active: 2002–2005; 2008; 2021–2025
- Label: Sony
- Past members: Carolyn Owlett; Tanya Bryson; Tisha Martin; Suzie Furlonger
- Website: Official website

The 411 were an English girl group comprising Carolyn Owlett, Tisha Martin, Suzie Furlonger and Tanya Bryson. The group was formed in late 2002 after Martin and Bryson sang backing vocals on Lemar's version of Al Green's "Let's Stay Together". The 411 took its name from the Mary J. Blige album What's the 411? (1992). The group released one studio album, Between the Sheets, and three top-forty singles before disbanding for the first time in 2005.

The 411 was reformed in 2007 with a new name, Sunshyne, with two new members after Furlonger left a few months before. The band soon changed back to its original name and Furlonger was replaced by Nuala Farrelly, who was a member of Sunshyne. Martin announced in 2008 on her own personal Myspace account that the band had yet again split up but still remained friends and that it would possibly release new material in the near future.

On 6 December 2021, it was announced that the 411 would reunite, originally for a one-off gig at Mighty Hoopla in June 2022 until the group added more gigs for the summer. Furlonger left the group for a second time in July 2022, owing to her busy schedule as a backing vocalist.

== History ==
=== 2002–2005: Formation and Between the Sheets ===
In 2002, Tanya Bryson and Tisha Martin — a familiar face at the time after appearing in the children's television shows Kerching! and The Basil Brush Show — recorded backing vocals for the R&B singer Lemar on his cover version of "Let's Stay Together" by Al Green. A woman from Sony Music was in attendance and told them, "You guys sound really nice together. If there were a few more of you we'd be interested in doing something with you." Carolyn Owlett grew up on the same street as Bryson, while Suzie Furlonger completed the line-up after a chance meeting when she visited London for the Notting Hill Carnival; after which the group went to do an audition for Sony, which resulted in a one-single record deal. The name "The 411" came from 4-1-1, an information line in the United States. Owlett told Newsround, "We thought it'd be cool if people wanted the information on us! And also it's the name of Mary J. Blige's first album and we're big fans!"

Labelled by one critic as "the hip hop Supremes", the group's first single, "On My Knees", was a hit in the UK (reaching the top 5) and Australia (reaching the top 30), which resulted in an album deal. A second single, "Dumb", reached number 3 in the UK and the top 30 in Australia. These singles appeared on the group's album Between the Sheets, with songs written by Diane Warren, Redeye and The 411 themselves. The group also recorded a cover version of SWV's hit "Weak".

Between the Sheets was also released in France and Japan. The French edition had two new versions of album tracks, recorded specifically for the French market: "Face À Toi Baby" featuring Mag (using the verses from "Dumb" with a special French chorus) and "Chance" featuring K'Maro (a new mix of "Chance" with a French language rap). The Japanese edition of the album had the standard 12 tracks from the UK version with two bonus tracks: "Drop Top Jeans" (which appeared as the B-side to "Teardrops" in the UK) and "Soaking Wet", with an enhanced section featuring the videos for "On My Knees" and "Dumb".

The album was certified Silver on 10 December 2004.

=== 2005–2007: Split and solo careers ===
In 2005, after the third single, "Teardrops", missed the UK top 20 and Between the Sheets failed to make the top 40, the 411 were dropped by Sony and subsequently disbanded. In a 2009 interview, Furlonger told Digital Spy, "When the album missed out on the top 40, I think our label just decided that it wasn't worth keeping us anymore." She went on to say, "[Sony] were in the middle of a merger at the time so they were clearing out a lot of their less successful groups and singers. I think if we'd gone to them and literally begged, they might have given us another chance. We could have tried to bring it all back with a fourth single, but I don't think there was anything on the album strong enough to be honest. I think another problem was that we didn't have much publicity. When you look at Girls Aloud or The Saturdays, they're always in the paper. We never had that kind of exposure."

After the split, Owlett and Furlonger were offered a new deal by Polydor to create a new girl group with one other unnamed former-girl group member. Owlett told the Right Back At Ya! podcast: "The deal that was offered wasn't for all of The 411. It was a whole new project, it was a development deal. They wanted to put in another girl and make it a hybrid thing. There was a girl from another band who had been doing OK but not busted in the way that they should've done but they had a lot of faith in this girl. I can tell you that it didn’t happen because I was one of them. We never found the sound. It was like they wanted to replicate The 411 but not as The 411 and it just didn't work. We wrote some songs and nothing was right. The members that were in that band didn't gel in the way that The 411 did. It was just a sad, sad time."

Furlonger worked as backing vocalist for various artists including Paloma Faith, Kevin Rowland, Percy Sledge, Sheila Ferguson, Emily Sandé, Peabo Bryson (duetting with him on several occasions) and regularly with Candi Staton and Cliff Richard (who also used her as his duet partner on tour). She also performed on shows such as CD:UK, GMTV, The X Factor: Battle of the Stars, T4 on the Beach, the Royal Variety Performance and at Glastonbury 2008 and 2010 with Candi Staton. Furlonger also appeared on The X Factor in 2008 as a solo singer in the Over-25s category, with Dannii Minogue as her mentor. She reached the final 6 but was eliminated from the show on 5 October, having failed to reach the live finals. Since the show, she has signed to Mousse T.'s label, Peppermint Jam, and recorded an album in Germany. She continues to provide backing vocals while in the UK and regularly toured with David Gest, duetting with some of the artists, as well as providing backing vocals for the other artists on The X Factor.

Bryson appeared in the identity parade in the first episode of the 23rd series of Never Mind the Buzzcocks, broadcast on 1 October 2009. She was not correctly identified, Ben Miller ruling her out as a possibility as he thought she was "too young" to have been in a defunct girl band.

=== 2007–2008: Reformation as Sunshyne ===
In September 2007, Bryson and Martin announced that they were forming a new group called Sunshyne and would be joined by Daizy Agnew and Nuala Farrelly. Agnew soon left and was replaced by Stephanie Barnes.

Sunshyne subsequently split up and Bryson and Martin decided to reform The 411, with the new line-up also including Owlett, who had not been involved in the formation of Sunshyne. The original member Furlonger was not involved, having decided to pursue other avenues, and her place was filled by Farrelly. However, in 2008, The 411 split up once again.

The band was reformed in 2007 and started recording songs for a second album with the new line-up.

"LoveFool" was to have been the fourth single by The 411 with two new members but it was later cancelled along with the album.

=== 2021–2025: reunion and Furlonger's departure ===
On 6 December 2021, it was announced that the 411 would reform and perform at Mighty Hoopla on 4 June 2022 with the Sugababes. All four original members were confirmed to be rejoining the band for the performance. Owlett later told Entertainment Focus, "We've been asked for a really long time to get back together, every year for probably the last 15 years. It's funny because my brother is really good friends with Jamie who runs Mighty Hoopla and he kept saying that if you guys get back together we’ll book you. When we were asked about this year we all said let's just do it. It just felt like the right time. We'd all had kids… but they are of an age where now we thought maybe we can pull this together. We said 'yes' to it and I don't think we knew how it would pan out."

Because of her busy schedule as a backing vocalist, Furlonger's departure was announced on 13 July, leaving the group to carry on as a trio.

Although the Mighty Hoopla gig was originally supposed to be a one-off performance, the 411 announced they would perform at the 90s Baby Pop Tour in September and October 2022 with Atomic Kitten, Five and Liberty X. On 7 September, the group confirmed it would be performing at the Mighty Hoopla Weekender in January 2023. The group performed at a Butlins Weekender in January 2024.

== Discography ==
=== Studio albums ===
List of studio albums, with selected chart positions and certifications
Title	Album details	Peak chart positions			Certifications
Title	Album details	UK	GER	FRA	Certifications
Between the Sheets	Released: 22 November 2004; Label: Sony Music	46	74	162	BPI: Silver
"—" denotes releases that did not chart or were not released in that territory.

=== Singles ===
List of singles as lead artist, with selected chart positions
Title	Year	Peak chart positions									Album
Title	Year	UK	IRE	GER	AUS	SWI	AUT	FRA	BEL	TUR	Album
"On My Knees"	2004	4	19	43	29	26	38	30	50	66	Between the Sheets
"Dumb"	2004	3	12	22	29	36	33	—	—	61	Between the Sheets
"Teardrops"	2004	23	32	71	—	—	—	—	—	40	Between the Sheets

== Tours ==
Co-headlining

- 90s Baby Pop Tour (2022)

One off appearances

- Mighty Hoopla (2022)
- Mighty Hoopla Weekender (2023)
- Butlins Weekender (2024)

== Members ==
- Tisha Martin
  (2002–2005, 2008, 2021–2025)
- Carolyn Owlett
  (2002–2005, 2008, 2021–2025)
- Tanya Bryson
  (2002–2005, 2008, 2021–2025)
- Suzie Furlonger
  (2002–2005, 2021–2022)
