= On My Knees (The 411 song) =

2004 single by the 411

Single by the 411 featuring Ghostface Killah

from the album Between the Sheets
- Released: 17 May 2004
- Genre: Pop; R&B
- Length: 3:38 (album version); 3:07 (single version)
- Label: Sony; Streetside
- Songwriters: Fitzgerald Scott; Tanya Boniface; Suzie Furlonger; Carolyn Owlett; Ed Townsend; Kim Hoglund; Tish Martin
- Producers: Fitzgerald Scott; Kookie

The 411 singles chronology
"On My Knees" (2004)	"Dumb" (2004)

Ghostface Killah singles chronology
"Tush" (2004)	"On My Knees" (2004)	"Milk Em'" (2005)

Music video
- "On My Knees" on YouTube

"On My Knees" is a song by British R&B girl group the 411, released as their debut single on 17 May 2004 and included on their first album, Between the Sheets (2004). The song samples "Ain't My Style" by the Main Ingredient and features guest vocals from American rapper Ghostface Killah. On the UK Singles Chart, the song reached number four and spent 10 weeks in the UK top 75. It also charted in nine other countries in Europe and Australia.

== Background ==
Band member Suzie Furlonger said: "It's basically about a girl who's in a relationship with someone that she knew was wrong for her at the time but allowed it anyway. He doesn't treat her well. It's her turning round to him and saying "that's it! I don't have to put up with this anymore". It's not a man-hating song - just a "don't put up with being treated badly" song." Bandmate Tisha Martin added, "Yeah, don't get us wrong - a lot of people think that we're men bashing but were not - we do like the guys!"

== Track listings ==
Digital download
No.	Title	Length
1.	"On My Knees" (radio version) (featuring Ghostface Killah)	3:07
2.	"On My Knees" (radio version no rap)	2:55

German maxi-CD single
No.	Title	Length
1.	"On My Knees" (featuring Ghostface Killah)	3:38
2.	"On My Knees" (w/o Ghostface Killah)	3:28
3.	"On My Knees" (Kardinal Beats remix)	4:09
4.	"On My Knees" (Blacksmith 12-inch remix)	4:02
5.	"On My Knees" (Blacksmith instrumental)	4:02

== Charts ==
=== Weekly charts ===
Weekly chart performance for "On My Knees"
Chart (2004)	Peak position
Australia (ARIA)	29
Australian Urban (ARIA)	11
Austria (Ö3 Austria Top 40)	38
Belgium (Ultratop 50 Flanders)	50
Belgium (Ultratip Bubbling Under Wallonia)	2
Europe (Eurochart Hot 100)	16
France (SNEP)	30
Germany (GfK)	43
Ireland (IRMA)	19
Italy (FIMI) without Ghostface Killah	18
Netherlands (Dutch Top 40)	33
Netherlands (Mega Top 50)	37
Netherlands (Single Top 100)	29
Scotland Singles (OCC)	3
Sweden (Sverigetopplistan)	43
Switzerland (Schweizer Hitparade)	26
UK Singles (OCC)	4
UK Airplay (Music Week)	4
UK Hip Hop/R&B (OCC)	2
Ukraine (TopHit)	176

=== Year-end charts ===
Year-end chart performance for "On My Knees"
Chart (2004)	Position
UK Singles (OCC)	68
UK Airplay (Music Week)	54
UK Urban (Music Week)	27

== Release history ==
Release dates and formats for "On My Knees"
Region	Date	Format(s)	Label(s)	Ref.
United Kingdom	17 May 2004	12-inch vinyl; CD	Sony; Streetside	
Australia	28 June 2004	CD	Sony; Streetside	
