= Treasure (animated TV series) =

- Created by: Michele Hanson; Christine Roche
- Based on: Treasure: Trials of a Teenage Terror by Michele Hanson
- Developed by: Orly Yadin; Sylvie Bringas; Aaron Simpson
- Directed by: François Perreault
- Voices of: Frances Barber; Elly Fairman; Jasmine Fitter; Jonathan Kydd; Rosemary Leach; Julie Legrand; Tisha Martin; Kate O'Sullivan
- Composers: Michel Corriveau; Robert Marchand
- Countries of origin: United Kingdom; Canada
- Original language: English
- No. of seasons: 1
- No. of episodes: 13 (26 segments)

Production
- Executive producers: David Ferguson; Helen Nabarro; Colin Rose
- Producers: Cassandra Schafhausen; Sylvie Bringas; Orly Yadin
- Running time: 24 minutes
- Production companies: CINAR Corporation; BBC Bristol; Halo Productions

Original release
- Network: BBC Two (United Kingdom); YTV (Canada)
- Release: 13 September 2000 – 17 December 2001

Treasure is an animated television series that ran from 13 September 2000 until 17 December 2001 and aired on BBC Two in the United Kingdom, ABC Kids in Australia, and YTV in Canada. It aired for 1 season of 13 episodes. The series was based on the popular newspaper column of the same name by Michele Hanson which became a book, Treasure: The Trials of a Teenage Terror (Virago Press, 2001, ISBN 1-85381-711-2), published under the pseudonym Gina Davidson. Treasure chronicles the life of Michele Hanson's daughter, Amy Hanson.

== Production ==
The characters were designed by illustrator Christine Roche.

This show was aimed at an older audience than most other works by CINAR (now known as WildBrain), and was consequently able to discuss darker themes and make more use of profanity.

Like Bob and Margaret (another British-Canadian-made animated TV series), this show was set in England, but added with darker themes.

== Major characters ==
- Treasure (voiced by Jasmine Fitter) – The title character, a fourteen-year-old girl who lives with her mother and grandmother. She is in many ways as a typical rowdy dumb blonde, with a love of hanging out with her friends, shopping, fashion, and rebelling against her family. A major focus of the show is how her family and friends put up with her behaviour.
- Mum (voiced by Frances Barber) – Treasure's long-suffering mother, who finds herself having to put up with having to look after both her troublesome daughter and her grumpy elderly mother. As much as she just wants Treasure to behave, she is shown in flashbacks to have been not that different from her daughter when she was her age.
- Grandma (voiced by Rosemary Leach) – Treasure's tough-as-nails grandmother, who despite her age is fiercely independent and tends to refuse help from those who offer it, mainly from Brian. Her friends often come over to play bridge.
- Brian (voiced by Jonathan Kydd) – Mum's boyfriend, who sometimes comes over to visit. Treasure doesn't particularly approve of him, and he is similarly often taken aback by the behaviour of the family as a whole.
- Rosie (voiced by Tisha Martin) – One of Treasure's two best friends, an African-British girl who is more willing to go along with Treasure's antics than Delilah.
- Delilah (voiced by Elly Fairman) – The other of Treasure's two best friends, a girl whose hair is dyed pink. She acts mostly as the voice of reason among the three, and when she goes along with Treasure's antics mostly does so begrudgingly.
- Mrs. Perez (voiced by Julie Legrand) – Treasure's family's next-door Spaniard-British neighbour, a somewhat uppity woman who doesn't mind her neighbours, but disagrees strongly of Treasure's behaviour. She has a son Treasure's age.
- Poppy (voiced by Kate O'Sullivan) – Treasure's pet dog, who has a habit of constantly drooling on things.

== Telecast and home media ==
Treasure was aired on BBC Two in the United Kingdom, ABC Kids in Australia, and YTV in Canada.

== Episodes ==
Episode No.	Episode Title	Air Date	Description
1	"When Mum Met Brian"/"Grandma's Room"	13 September 2000	When Mum Met Brian – When the man Mum was dating cheats on her, she looks for someone else to date and eventually meets Brian.; Grandma's Room – Treasure and Grandma get their bedrooms redecorated.
2	"Little Black Dress"/"Night Club"	20 September 2000	Little Black Dress – Treasure buys a short black dress that she plans to wear while going out with her friends later that night, something Mum doesn't approve of.; Night Club – Treasure wants to go out to a night club called the Strobe, but Mum is hesitant to let her go.
3	"Feminine Mystique"/"Treasure's Party"	27 September 2000	Feminine Mystique - Treasure becomes overly concerned about her body image, much to Mum's annoyance.; Treasure's Party - Treasure invites a bunch of her friends over for a party, including a new friend named Tara.
4	"The Goldfish Murderer"/"The Big Sleepover"	11 October 2000	The Goldfish Murderer – Treasure discovers that her goldfish are sick, and while she manages to save them for a while, an oddball friend of hers makes it worse.; The Big Sleepover – Treasure wants a male friend of hers to spend the night at her house, but Mum disapproves, worried about what might happen when Treasure is left alone in her bedroom with a boy.
5	"The Dog's Eyeball"/"What Do We Want?"	25 October 2000	The Dog's Eyeball - Mum is left looking after Poppy when Poppy gets an infected eye. Meanwhile, Treasure has a new piercing that's also gotten infected, and Grandma is sick as well.; What Do We Want? - Mum, fed up with being bossed around by Treasure and Grandma, decides to go on strike, leaving them to do the cooking and cleaning themselves.
6	"Two Wheels Good"/"Grandma Wins a Prize"	8 November 2000	Two Wheels Good - Treasure asks Mum to buy her a bicycle, so she can go places without constantly asking to be driven.; Grandma Wins a Prize - Grandma wins first prize in a cooking contest, and falls in love with a man she meets there. Treasure, overhearing her inviting him to dinner over the phone, mistakenly believes that Grandma is dating a criminal.
7	"Everyone Go Away"/"Treasure is in Fact Not Stupid"	22 November 2000	Everyone Go Away - Treasure and Mum decide to go on holiday in Cornwall, bringing Poppy, Delilah, and Rosie along. However, the house they stay at isn't quite what they had hoped.; Treasure is in Fact Not Stupid - When Rosie and Delilah make fun of her for being "stupid", Treasure decides to make new friends and change her image to be more "clever".
8	"Treasure in Space"/"Links with Europe"	5 December 2000	Treasure in Space - When Treasure runs up an incredibly high phone bill, Mum limits Treasure to one phone call a day and, at Brian's convincing, buys a computer so she can talk to people through email.; Links with Europe - Mum is trying (with no success) to teach Treasure how to speak French, so Mrs. Perez suggests that she introduce her to Jean-Marc, the French exchange student currently living with Mrs. Perez.
9	"Fit for Life"/"Feeding Treasure"	19 December 2000	Fit for Life - Mum becomes concerned that she's gaining too much weight after trying on clothes at the mall, and decides to go swimming to exercise. Meanwhile, Treasure takes up skateboarding to get closer to a boy she likes.; Feeding Treasure - After a school trip to a dairy farm, Treasure becomes an ardent vegetarian, leaving Mum to find foods that will accommodate her new diet.
10	"Fame"/"Who Are We?"	30 January 2001	Fame - Treasure becomes obsessed with the idea of being rich and famous, and thus gets a part in the school play. This causes her to become jealous of Delilah when she appears on the news.; Who Are We? - At her school's Career Day, Treasure comes to the conclusion that she wants to be a stylist. To practice, she decides to help Mum look good enough to get a job after three days of being out of work.
11	"Eco Treasure"/"Big Day Out"	5 February 2001	Eco Treasure – When Treasure and her friends learn that the trees at the local park are being cut down to make way for a new multiplex, they decide to stage a protest.; Big Day Out – Treasure's class is taking a field trip to France, and she's embarrassed to learn that Mum is tagging along.
12	"Unwelcome Visitor"/"Milestone Year"	12 February 2001	Unwelcome Visitor - Mum invites an old friend of hers from college named Bob over for dinner, much to Grandma's delight and Treasure's annoyance.; Milestone Year - Mum begins having an existential crisis over her upcoming 50th birthday, which isn't helped by knowing that Brian is planning a surprise for the occasion.
13	"Two Faces of Treasure"/"Nightmare on Oxford Street"	17 December 2001	Two Faces of Treasure – Mum goes to a parent-teacher conference and learns that Treasure is apparently far more well-behaved at school than at home. At the same time, Treasure has gotten a job at the supermarket.; Nightmare on Oxford Street – In the final episode, Treasure and Mum are out Christmas shopping when Treasure decides to give money to a homeless man, causing her to become fiercely adamant about helping the homeless.
