= Owlett =

Owlett is a surname. Notable people with the surname include:

- Carolyn Owlett (born 1984), British model, actress, presenter, broadcast journalist, producer, and singer/songwriter
- Clint Owlett, American politician
- Jack Owlett (born 1995), Scottish rugby union player
