= Teardrops (The 411 song) =

Single by the 411

from the album Between the Sheets
- Released: 15 November 2004
- Length: 3:21
- Label: Streetside; Sony
- Songwriters: Tanya Boniface; Suzie Furlonger; Kim Hoglund; Carolyn Owlett; Tisha Martin; Lalo Schifrin; Fitzgerald Scott
- Producers: Fitzgerald Scott; Kim Hoglund

The 411 singles chronology
"Dumb" (2004)	"Teardrops" (2004)

"Teardrops" is a song by British R&B group the 411. It was written by band members Suzie Furlonger, Carolyn Owlett, Tisha Martin and Tanya Boniface along with Fitzgerald Scott and Kim Hoglund for their debut studio album Between the Sheets (2004), while production was helmed by Scott and Hoglund. The song is built around a sample of "Sour Times" (1994) by English trip hop group Portishead, itself a sample of Argentine composer Lalo Schifrin's "Danube Incident" (1967). Due to the inclusion of the sample, Schifrin is also credited as a songwriter. "Teardrops" was released as the album's third and final single from and debuted and peaked on the UK Singles Chart at number 23.

== Track listings ==
UK CD1
No.	Title	Writer(s)	Producer(s)	Length
1.	"Teardrops"	The 411; Kim Hoglund; Fitzgerald Scott	Hoglund; Scott	3:19
2.	"Drop Top Jeans" (featuring Spoony)	The 411; Scott; Ryan Monroe; Omar Chandla	Omar & Munroe	3:13

UK CD2
No.	Title	Writer(s)	Producer(s)	Length
1.	"Teardrops"	The 411; Kim Hoglund; Fitzgerald Scott	Hoglund; Scott	3:19
2.	"Teardrops" (Kardinal Beats Remix featuring Ying Yang Twins)	The 411; Hoglund; Scott	Hoglund; Scott; Omar & Munroe^{[a]}	4:02
3.	"Teardrops" (Shux Remix)	The 411; Hoglund; Scott	Hoglund; Scott; Al Shux^{[a]}	3:50
4.	"Teardrops" (Music video)			3:19

Notes

- ^{^[a]} denotes additional producer

== Personnel and credits ==
Credits adapted from the liner notes of Between the Sheets.

- Naweed Ahmed – mastering engineer
- Tanya Boniface – vocals, writer
- Steve Fitzmaurice – mixing engineer
- Suzie Furlonger – vocals, writer
- Kim Hoglund – producer, writer
- Carolyn Owlett – vocals, writer
- Tisha Martin – vocals, writer
- Lalo Schifrin – writer (sample)
- Fitzgerald Scott – producer, writer
- Steve Sedgwick – engineering assistance
- Jonathan Shakhovskoy – Pro Tools

== Charts ==
Chart (2004)	Peak position
Germany (GfK)	71
Ireland (IRMA)	32
Scotland Singles (OCC)	24
Switzerland (Schweizer Hitparade)	74
UK Singles (OCC)	23

== Release history ==
Region	Date	Format	Label
United Kingdom	15 November 2004	CD single; digital download	Streetside Records; Sony Music UK
