= Dumb (The 411 song) =

2004 single by the 411

Single by the 411

from the album Between the Sheets
- Released: 23 August 2004
- Genre: Pop; R&B
- Length: 2:48
- Label: Sony; Streetside
- Songwriters: Tanya Boniface; Suzie Furlonger; Tisha Martin; Carolyn Owlett; Gandalf Roudette-Mushcamp; Joshua Thompson
- Producer: Dave McCracken

The 411 singles chronology
"On My Knees" (2004)	"Dumb" (2004)	"Teardrops" (2004)

"Dumb" is a song by British R&B group the 411. It was written by band members Suzie Furlonger, Carolyn Owlett, Tisha Martin and Tanya Boniface along with Gandalf Roudette-Mushcamp and Joshua Thompson for their debut studio album Between the Sheets (2004). Production was helmed by Dave McCracken, based on an original production by Redeye, with Fitzgerald Scott credited as additional and vocal producer on the track.

"Dumb" was released as the album's second single on 23 August 2004. It is the 411's highest-charting single in their home country, peaking at number three on the UK Singles Chart. In other countries, "Dumb" reached number 12 in Ireland and entered the top 40 in Australia, Austria, Germany, and Switzerland. In Germany, the song served as the theme song for Sex and the City during ProSieben's commercial breaks. A French-language version of the song called "Face á toi baby" with French rapper Mag (featuring the verses from "Dumb" with a special French chorus) appears on the French version of Between the Sheets.

In 2018, singer Imani Williams sampled "Dumb" for her single of the same name.

== Music video ==
The music video features the band performing in strobing lights. In the first half, they wear black outfits, before changing to colourful costumes in the second half. Furlonger wore a wig during the shoot.

== Track listings ==
All tracks were written by the 411, Gandalf Roudette-Mushcamp, and Joshua Thompson.

UK CD1
No.	Title	Producer(s)	Length
1.	"Dumb"	Dave McCracken; Redeye^{[a]}; Fitzgerald Scott^{[b]}	2:48
2.	"Dumb" (Main Ron G. remix)	McCracken; Redeye^{[a]}; Scott^{[b]}; Ron G.^{[c]}	3:21

UK CD2 and German maxi-CD single
No.	Title	Producer(s)	Length
1.	"Dumb"	McCracken; Redeye^{[a]}; Scott^{[b]}	2:48
2.	"Dumb" (Kardinal Beats remix)	McCracken; Redeye^{[a]}; Scott^{[b]}; Omar & Munroe^{[c]}	3:41
3.	"Dumb" (Cool Kid remix featuring JP Esquire)	McCracken; Redeye^{[a]}; Scott^{[b]}	3:29
4.	"Dumb" (video)		2:49

Australian CD single
No.	Title	Producer(s)	Length
1.	"Dumb"	McCracken; Redeye^{[a]}; Scott^{[b]}	2:48
2.	"Dumb" (Main Ron G. remix)	McCracken; Redeye^{[a]}; Scott^{[b]}; Ron G.^{[c]}	3:21
3.	"Dumb" (Cool Kid remix featuring JP Esquire)	McCracken; Redeye^{[a]}; Scott^{[b]}	3:29
4.	"Dumb" (Kardinal Beats remix)	McCracken; Redeye^{[a]}; Scott^{[b]}; Omar & Munroe^{[c]}	4:31

Notes

- ^{^[a]} denotes original producer
- ^{^[b]} denotes vocal and additional producer
- ^{^[c]} denotes remix producer

== Personnel ==
Personnel are adapted from the liner notes of Between the Sheets.

- Tanya Boniface – vocals, writing
- Steve Fitzmaurice – mix engineering
- Suzie Furlonger – vocals, writing
- Tisha Martin – vocals, writing
- Dave McCracken – producer
- Carolyn Owlett – vocals, writing
- Gandalf Roudette-Mushcamp – vocals, writing
- Fitzgerald Scott – additional production, vocal production
- Joshua Thompson – vocals, writing

== Charts ==
=== Weekly charts ===
Weekly chart performance for "Dumb"
Chart (2004)	Peak position
Australia (ARIA)	29
Australian Urban (ARIA)	7
Austria (Ö3 Austria Top 40)	33
CIS Airplay (TopHit)	12
Croatia (HRT)	9
Europe (Eurochart Hot 100)	10
Germany (GfK)	22
Hungary (Dance Top 40)	6
Hungary (Editors' Choice Top 40)	3
Ireland (IRMA)	12
Italy (FIMI)	23
Russia Airplay (TopHit)	10
Scottish Singles Sales (Official Charts)	3
Switzerland (Schweizer Hitparade)	36
UK Singles (Official Charts)	3
UK Hip Hop/R&B (Official Charts)	1

=== Year-end charts ===
Year-end chart performance for "Dumb"
Chart (2004)	Position
CIS Airplay (TopHit)	101
Russia Airplay (TopHit)	55
UK Singles (OCC)	62

== Release history ==
Release dates and formats for "Dumb"
Region	Date	Format(s)	Label(s)	Ref.
United Kingdom	23 August 2004	12-inch vinyl; CD	Sony; Streetside	
Australia	11 October 2004	CD	Sony; Streetside	
