= Carolyn Owlett =

- Born: Carolyn Julia Owlett; 8 March 1984 (age 42); London, England
- Occupations: Singer; model
- Years active: 2003–present
- Member of: The 411
- Website: bentertained.wixsite.com/allaboutthe411

Carolyn Julia Owlett (born 8 March 1984) is an English singer and model. She is a member of R&B group the 411.

== Career ==
The 411's first single "On My Knees" with Ghostface Killah went to No. 4 in the UK chart while their second single "Dumb" reached No. 3 in the UK Chart. The group released a third single, "Teardrops" and an album Between the Sheets before disbanding in 2005.

At the end of 2005, Owlett was asked, along with bandmate Suzie Furlonger, to sign a separate deal with Polydor Records.

She was the face of Amplified clothing in 2008, 2009, and 2010 and made an Axe hair care commercial for the US. As a television presenter, her credits include pieces for Current TV. Her 2008 programme Sexy Girls Have It Easy had over 40,000 views in the first month, and by October 2010 had the highest ever online views for the channel. She has written articles for Marie Claire magazine, and is a producer for a Broadcast PR company.

In December 2021, it was announced that the 411 would re-form to play at Mighty Hoopla in June 2022. Due to the success of the gig, the band have continued touring the UK together.

== Personal life ==
Owlett lives in Hackney with her sons, actors Billy Barratt and Cassius Thompson. In 2020, Billy became the youngest ever winner of the International Emmy Award for Best Actor for Responsible Child.
