= Velile Tshabalala =

British actress (born 1984)

Velile Tshabalala is a British actress, known for portraying Kareesha Lopez in Kerching! and Rosita in the 2008 Doctor Who special "The Next Doctor".

== Background ==
Born in Whitechapel, London, Tshabalala was raised in Ilford. She is of Zimbabwean descent. Her father is a mechanical engineer and her mother is a health visitor. She has one sister and two brothers. She trained at the Sylvia Young Theatre School, where she attended weekend classes from the age of 14. For higher education, she attended sixth form and completed her A-levels.

== Career ==
Tshabalala made her professional debut at the age of 18, in the CBBC sitcom Kerching!. She played waitress Kareesha Lopez, who did very little work and was a stereotypical teenage girl. She played several roles in all three series of the BBC Three sketch comedy Tittybangbang. She appeared as a prostitute in the 2004 short film Streets. In January 2008, she played a librarian in the ChuckleVision episode "Jumping Jackpot". She played Rosita in that year's Doctor Who Christmas special "The Next Doctor". She made her pantomime debut in the 2008 production of Dick Whittington's Cat at the Compass Theatre in Ickenham. In 2011, Tshabalala very briefly appeared in the penultimate episode of series three of the E4 series Misfits as the gangs' newest probation worker, Laura. However, she only lasted for a matter of seconds after arriving at the community centre, ultimately being killed after being bitten by a zombie. In July 2014, she completed filming on the feature film The Journey. In November 2021, it was announced that Tshabalala had been cast in the Channel 4 soap opera Hollyoaks as Viv, the mother of established character DeMarcus Westwood (Tomi Ade). In February 2022, she starred as Gloria in Running with Lions at the Lyric Theatre, London. In 2024, Tshabalala began appearing as recurring character Stella Clayton in Eastenders.

Her day job is currently at the St Marylebone Bridge School working as a teaching assistant. She has been working at the school since September 2016.

== Filmography ==
Year	Title	Role	Notes
2003–2006	Kerching!	Kareesha Lopez	
2004	Streets	Prostitute	Film
2006	Tittybangbang	Various characters	
2008	ChuckleVision	Librarian	Episode: "Jumping Jackpot"
2008	Katy Brand's Big Ass Show	Various characters	
2008	Doctor Who	Rosita	Episode: "The Next Doctor"
2009	The Legend of Dick and Dom	Cheryl	1 episode
2011	Misfits	Laura	1 episode
2012	The Secret of Crickley Hall	Teacher	1 episode
2013	Call the Midwife	Monique Hyde	1 episode
2016–2017	Class Dismissed	Various	12 episodes
2021	Hollyoaks	Viv	3 episodes
2023	Death in Paradise	Barbara Carter	Episode: "An Unpleasant Homecoming"
2023	Casualty	Caroline Pickard	Episode: "The Straw"
2024	EastEnders	Stella Clayton	8 episodes
