= Michele Hanson =

British writer and columnist

- Born: 13 September 1942; London
- Died: 2 March 2018 (aged 75)
- Employer: The Guardian

Michele Regina Hanson (September 13, 1942 – March 2, 2018) was a British writer and a columnist for The Guardian. Hanson's nickname for her daughter was used for her character, Treasure, who originated in her Guardian column and appeared in two books, Treasure: The Trials of a Teenage Terror (1993) and What Treasure Did Next (1996). These were the basis for the animated TV series Treasure.

== Bibliography ==
- Treasure: The Trials of a Teenage Terror. London: Virago. 1993. ISBN 1-85381-711-2. (as Gina Davidson)
- What Treasure Did Next. London: Virago. 1996. ISBN 1-86049-114-6. (as Gina Davidson)
- Age of Dissent: Collected from her Guardian columns. London: Virago. 2000. ISBN 1-86049-825-6.
- Living With Mother: Right to the Very End. London: Virago. 2006. ISBN 978-1-84408-384-8.
- Absolutely Barking: Adventures in Dog Ownership. London: Simon & Schuster. 2014. ISBN 978-0-85720-492-9.
