= Kerching! =

Children's TV series

- Kerching! title card
- Genre: Children's comedy
- Created by: Juliet Dension
- Starring: Devon Anderson; Tendayi Jembere; Tisha Martin
- Country of origin: United Kingdom
- Original language: English
- No. of series: 4
- No. of episodes: 52

Production
- Running time: 24 minutes

Original release
- Network: CBBC
- Release: 6 January 2003 – 24 February 2006

Kerching! is a British television children's comedy series which aired on the CBBC Channel from 6 January 2003 to 24 February 2006. The show follows the life of teenage dot-com entrepreneur Taj Lewis, along with his two friends, Seymour Franklin and Danny Spooner.

== Cast ==
Role	Actor	Refs.
Taj Lewis	Devon Anderson	
Seymour Franklin	Tendayi Jembere	
Danny Spooner	Jamie Sweeney	
Missy Lewis	Tisha Martin	
Kareesha Lopez	Velile Tshabalala	
Josephine Lewis	Judy Browne	
Omar Lewis	Jaeden Burke	
Ricardo Murray	Danny Young	
Carlton	Curtis Walker	
Tamsin	Hannah Tointon	
Kayla	Kamara Bacchus	

== Episodes ==
=== Series 1 (2003) ===
No. overall	No. in series	Title	Directed by	Written by	Original release date
1	1	"Have Grub Will Travel"	Ben Gosling Fuller	Marcus Powell	6 January 2003
2	2	"Project Ska Face"	Ben Gosling Fuller	Othniel Smith	6 January 2003
3	3	"Meeting Mr Big Stuff"	Ben Gosling Fuller	Marcus Powell	7 January 2003
4	4	"Another Level"	Ben Fuller	John Brennan	8 January 2003
5	5	"Game Set and Love Match"	Ben Gosling Fuller	Unknown	9 January 2003
6	6	"The Ego Has Landed"	Ben Gosling Fuller	Unknown	10 January 2003
7	7	"It's an Ill Wind"	Unknown	Annie Bruce	20 January 2003
8	8	"By Royal Appointment"	Ben Gosling Fuller	Unknown	21 January 2003
9	9	"Sue Me Sir"	Unknown	Unknown	22 January 2003
10	10	"It'll Be Alright on the Night"	Ben Gosling Fuller	Unknown	23 January 2003
11	11	"St Valentines Day Messenger"	Unknown	Unknown	23 January 2003
12	12	"Here Today"	Unknown	Unknown	24 January 2003

=== Series 2 (2004) ===
No. overall	No. in series	Title	Directed by	Written by	Original release date
13	1	"Save Our Chill"	Ben Gosling Fuller	TBD	2004
14	2	"Bro-Selecta"	TBD	TBD	2004
15	3	"From Dude to Dud"	Ben Gosling Fuller	TBD	2004
16	4	"Lord of the Dance"	TBD	TBD	2004
17	5	"Just the Job"	TBD	TBD	2004
18	6	"Faking It"	TBD	TBD	2004
19	7	"Seymour's Kitchen"	TBD	TBD	2004
20	8	"One Is a Lonely Number"	TBD	TBD	2004
21	9	"Game On"	TBD	TBD	2004
22	10	"Who's the Man?"	TBD	TBD	2004
23	11	"Friends Disunited"	TBD	TBD	2004
24	12	"Let's Get Deep"	TBD	TBD	2004
25	13	"Who Wants To Be a Millionaire?"	TBD	TBD	2004

=== Series 3 (2005) ===
No. overall	No. in series	Title	Directed by	Written by	Original release date
26	1	"Moving on Up"	Angie de Chastelai Smith	John Brennan	Unknown
27	2	"Two's a Crowd"	Angie de Chastelai Smith	Anne Bruce	Unknown
28	3	"Some Like it Hot... Not"	Angie de Chastelai Smith	Kay Stonham	Unknown
29	4	"Don't Go Charging"	Angie de Chastelai Smith	Patricia Elcock	Unknown
30	5	"Election Fever"	Angie de Chastelai Smith	Shelia Hyade	Unknown
31	6	"Losing It"	Dez McCarthy	Lynn Peters	Unknown
32	7	"Holding the Baby"	Angie de Chastelai Smith	Gerard Foster	Unknown
33	8	"Happy Birthday"	Dez McCarthy	Fiona Thompson	Unknown
34	9	"Twas The Summer Before Christmas"	Dez McCarthy	Paul McKenzie	Unknown
35	10	"Do The Right Thing"	Dez McCarthy	Shiela Hyde	Unknown
36	11	"Back to the Start"	TBD	TBD	Unknown
37	12	"Making It"	Dez McCarthy	John brennan	Unknown

=== Series 4 (2006) ===
No. overall	No. in series	Title	Directed by	Written by	Original release date
38	1	"Child's Play"	Dez McCarthy	Patricia Elcock	2006
39	2	"The Boy is Back"	Angie De Chastelai Smith	Shelia Hyde	2006
40	3	"Sweet Smell of Success"	Candida Julian-Jones	Gary Lawson & John Pelips	2006
41	4	"Driving Miss Crazy"	Angie de Chasteliani Smith	Kay Stonham	2006
42	5	"The Jackhammer"	Angie de Chasteliani Smith	Chris Reddy	2006
43	6	"Cool and the Gang"	Angie de Chastelai Smith	Gerard Foster	2006
44	7	"If It Ain't Broke, Don't Fix It!"	Angie de Chastelai Smith	Shelia Hyde	2006
45	8	"Making A Good Impression"	Dez McCarthy	Gerard Foster	2006
46	9	"Making a Difference"	Angie de Chastelai Smith	John Brennan	2006
47	10	"Something Wicked this Way Comes"	Dez McCarthy	Annie Bruce	2006
48	11	"Chilloween"	Dez McCarthy	Annie Bruce	2006
49	12	"Wait Until Dark"	Dez McCarthy	Kay Stonham	2006
50	13	"Hurrah for Bollywood"	Dez McCarthy	John Brennan	2006
51	14	"Always and Forever"	Dez McCarthy	Patrick Elcock	2006
52	15	"Rudekid"	Dez McCarthy	Sheila Hyade	24 February 2006
