= Saturn Award for Best International Series =

Annual US television award

In 2008, the Saturn Awards introduced a new category, Best International Series, recognizing non-American television productions. Due to an error, the original press release announcing the winners of the 34th Saturn Awards, issued on June 24 2008, omitted the category. However, a corrected press release and website update were issued on June 26, 2008.

The category was discontinued starting with the 35th Saturn Awards nominations for 2008, which were announced on March 16, 2009.

Year	Series	American broadcast network
2007 (34th)	Doctor Who	Sci Fi Channel
