= Between the Sheets (The 411 album) =

Studio album by The 411
- Released: 22 November 2004
- Genre: R&B
- Length: 46:26
- Label: Sony Music
- Producer: Fitzgerald Scott (also exec.); Kookie; Steve Fitzmaurice; Mark Reily; Brion James; Craig Hardy; First Man; Dave McCracken; Redeye; Matt Rowe; Cool Kidd; Young Gordon; Omar & Munroe

Singles from Between the Sheets
- 1. "On My Knees" Released: 5 May 2004; 2. "Dumb" Released: 23 August 2004; 3. "Teardrops" Released: 15 November 2004

Between the Sheets is the debut and only studio album by British girl group The 411. It was released by Sony Music on 22 November 2004 in the United Kingdom. Between the Sheets was supported by three successful singles, including "On My Knees" featuring Ghostface Killah, "Dumb" and "Teardrops". However, upon release the album failed to match the success of its singles. It charted outside of the UK top 40 and spent just three weeks on the chart, resulting in the group being dropped by Sony.

== Critical reception ==
Professional ratings
Review scores
Source	Rating
The Guardian	2/5 stars
Yahoo! Music UK	7/10

Kitty Empire from The Guardian found that "the 411's debut album offers up a further array of songs that are either too bland or not quite right. Third single "Teardrops" pivots on the same Lalo Schifrin riff that Portishead lifted, but as atmospheric as it is, it remains a secondhand idea. Between the Sheets isn't dreadful, but it sounds like an opportunity missed. With the Sugababes sick of the sight of each other, they could have cleaned up." Dan Gennoe, writing for Yahoo! Music UK, called the album a "solid debut, with exceptional moments, [that] still makes them the UK’s most credible and interesting girl band – at least until the Sugababes return."

== Track listing ==
Between the Sheets – Standard version
No.	Title	Writer(s)	Producer(s)	Length
1.	"On My Knees" (featuring Ghostface Killah)	The 411; Fitzgerald Scott; Kookie; Ed Townsend	Scott; Kookie; Steve Fitzmaurice^{[a]}	3:39
2.	"Teardrops"	The 411; Scott; Kookie; Lalo Schifrin	Scott; Kookie	3:21
3.	"China Girl"	The 411; Scott; Brion James	Scott; James	3:28
4.	"Chance"	The 411; Scott; Craig Hardy	Scott; Hardy	3:13
5.	"My Friend"	The 411; Scott; First Man	Scott; First Man	2:44
6.	"Between the Sheets"	The 411; Scott; First Man	Scott; First Man	3:40
7.	"Dumb"	The 411; Joshua Thompson; Gandalf Roudette-Mushcamp	Dave McCracken; Scott^{[a]}; Redeye^{[b]}	2:48
8.	"Forever Begins"	The 411; Thompson; Roudette-Mushcamp	Redeye; McCraken^{[a]}	3:41
9.	"Jumpin"	Clement Dodd; Marcia Griffiths	Matt Rowe	3:37
10.	"What If It Was You?"	Diane Warren	Scott; First Man	3:34
11.	"I Don't Want to Talk About It" (featuring JP Esq)	The 411; JP Esq; Cool Kidd	Cool Kidd; Young Gordon^{[a]}	4:36
12.	"Can't Fight Love"	The 411; Scott	Scott	3:18
Total length:				46:26

Japan bonus tracks
No.	Title	Writer(s)	Producer(s)	Length
13.	"Drop Top Jeans"	The 411; Scott; Omar & Munroe	Scott; Omar & Munroe	3:13
14.	"Soaking Wet"	The 411; Scott; First Man	Scott; First Man	3:35

France bonus tracks
No.	Title	Writer(s)	Producer(s)	Length
13.	"Face À Toi Baby" (featuring Mag)	The 411; Scott; Omar & Munroe	Scott; Omar & Munroe	3:13
14.	"Chance" (featuring K.Maro)	The 411; Scott; First Man; Cyril Kamar	Scott; Hardy	3:13

Notes

- ^{^[a]} signifies additional producer
- ^{^[b]} signifies original producer

Sample credits

- "On My Knees" contains a sample from "Ain't My Style," performed by Main ingredient, written by Ed Townsend.
- "Teardrops" contains a sample from "Danube Incident," performed by Lalo Schiffrin.
- "Jumpin" contains a sample from "Feel Like Jumping," written by Clement Dadd and Marcia Griffin with additional lyrics by Matt Rowe.

== Charts ==
Chart (2004)	Peak position
French Albums (SNEP)	162
German Albums (Offizielle Top 100)	74
UK Albums (OCC)	46
