= The Next Doctor =

199 – "The Next Doctor"
- Doctor Who episode

Cast
- Doctor: David Tennant – Tenth Doctor
- Companions: David Morrissey – "The Next Doctor" (Jackson Lake); Velile Tshabalala – Rosita Farisi
- Others: Dervla Kirwan – Miss Hartigan; Nicholas Briggs – Cybermen voices; Paul Kasey – Cyber Leader; Ruari Mears – Cybershade; Edmund Kente – Mr Scoones; Michael Bertenshaw – Mr Cole; Jason Morell – Vicar; Neil McDermott – Jed; Ashley Horne – Lad; Tom Langford – Frederic; Jordan Southwell – Urchin; Matthew Allick – Docker

Production
- Directed by: Andy Goddard
- Written by: Russell T Davies
- Produced by: Susie Liggat
- Executive producers: Russell T Davies; Julie Gardner
- Music by: Murray Gold
- Production code: 4.14
- Series: 2008–2010 specials
- Running time: 60 minutes
- First broadcast: 25 December 2008

Chronology
← Preceded by "Journey's End"	Followed by → "Planet of the Dead"

"The Next Doctor" is a special episode of the British science fiction television programme Doctor Who, broadcast on 25 December 2008 as the fourth Doctor Who Christmas special of the revived series. During its original airing, the episode had an audience of 13.1 million viewers and was the second-most-watched programme of Christmas Day 2008.

David Tennant stars as the Tenth Doctor with one-off companions Jackson Lake (David Morrissey) and Rosita Farisi (Velile Tshabalala). The episode is set in London during the Christmas period of 1851. In the episode, the Doctor teams up with a man who appears to be another incarnation of himself; in their quest to foil a plot by the Cybermen to create a giant Cyberman called a CyberKing under the control of workhouse matron Miss Hartigan (Dervla Kirwan), the two inadvertently discover that the "new" Doctor is actually Jackson Lake, a regular human who began suffering from amnesia and believing himself to be the Doctor after interacting with Cyberman technology.

== Plot ==
The Tenth Doctor lands in London on Christmas Eve, 1851. Overhearing cries for help, he encounters a man calling himself "the Doctor" and his companion Rosita attempting and failing to capture a Cybershade. The Doctor believes the man, who is suffering from amnesia, may be a future incarnation of himself. The man, dubbed the Next Doctor, takes the Doctor to a nearby house of a recently deceased reverend, believing him to be tied to a series of disappearances around London. Inside, they discover a pair of Cyberman data-storage infostamps, which the Next Doctor recalls holding the night that he lost his memories.

The two Doctors regroup with Rosita at the Next Doctor's base. The Doctor comes to realize that the Next Doctor is really a human, Jackson Lake, the supposed first missing person. The Doctor suspects that Jackson had encountered the Cybermen and used the infostamps, containing knowledge of the Doctor, to ward them off. Jackson's mind then entered a fugue state from the trauma of the Cybermen killing his wife, and as the infostamp had infused his mind with knowledge of the Doctor, he came to believe he was the Doctor. The Doctor and Rosita set off to try to find the source of the Cybermen.

The Doctor and Rosita find numerous children, pulled from workhouses around the city by Miss Mercy Hartigan, are being put to work at an underground facility under Cybermen guard. The Cybermen betray Miss Hartigan, and convert her into the controller for the "CyberKing", a giant mechanical Cyberman powered by the energy generated by the children. She also gains control over the Cybermen. Jackson remembers encountering the Cybermen on moving into his new home. The Doctor discovers another entrance to the Cybermen's base under Jackson's house. Within the complex, as the CyberKing starts to rise to the city, the three rescue the children, including Jackson's son, who was abducted in the initial attack that triggered Jackson's fugue state. The CyberKing starts to lay waste to the city. When Miss Hartigan refuses the Doctor's offer to leave the planet, the Doctor uses the infostamps to sever her connection to the CyberKing, exposing her to the raw emotion of what she has done. The emotional feedback destroys both the Cybermen and Miss Hartigan. As the CyberKing starts to topple, the Doctor draws it into the Time Vortex with technology from Jackson's cellar, saving London.

Afterwards, the Doctor and Jackson reflect on the day's events, and the Doctor shows Jackson the inside of the real TARDIS. Jackson asks the Doctor to join him and his family for Christmas dinner, which the Doctor, after a bit of hesitation, accepts.

=== Continuity ===
According to Neil Gaiman, when discussing the 2013 episode "Nightmare in Silver", the Cybus Industries Cybermen "zapped off into time and space" by the Doctor at the end of this episode eventually encountered the Mondas Cybermen; their "cross-breeding and interchange of technology" resulted in the variety of Cybermen seen in that episode.

== Production ==
=== Writing ===
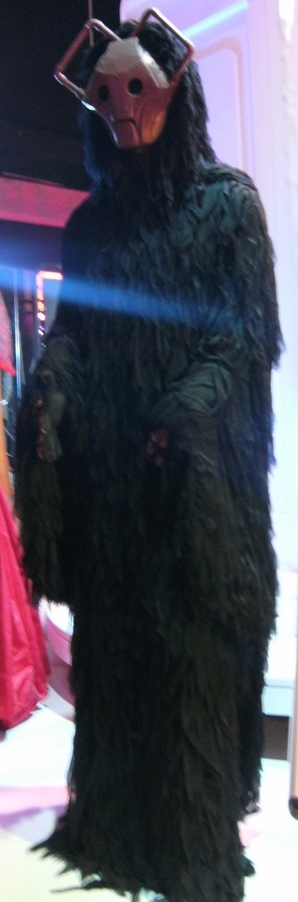
A Cybershade on display at the Doctor Who Experience

Pre-broadcast publicity, based on excerpts from Davies' book Doctor Who: The Writer's Tale, revealed that the Doctor would meet a man played by David Morrissey who also claims to be the Doctor. In further excerpts, Davies commented, "The best title for this episode would be The Two Doctors... but maybe not. The New Doctor, perhaps? Or The Next Doctor? I quite like The Next Doctor." The book also contained two pictures from a scene cut from the end of the previous episode, intended to segue into the special echoing the previous two series. This scene was included on the series boxset.

Following the success of the previous year's Christmas special, "Voyage of the Damned", which guest starred pop star Kylie Minogue as one-off companion Astrid Peth, Russell T Davies had initially felt tempted to copy this format with another high-profile guest star, but decided against it after jokingly offering up "Cheryl Cole on board the Hindenburg" as an example.

When writing the episode, Davies was unhappy with the final scene in which the Doctor gets rid of the CyberKing with the convenient Dalek dimension vault, but could not think of another way to stop London being crushed by a giant robot. Later, after the episode was produced, he conceived an alternate ending in which Miss Hartigan "should have destroyed the Cybermen when she screamed... but she's still in the chair", as the CyberKing falls to the Earth, the Doctor calls out to her saying "Save them." This version would have Hartigan redeem herself as she is the one to cause the CyberKing to disappear, with no need for what Davies called "a silly Dalek continuum dimension vault". Julie Gardner felt this would have been a superior, "marvellous" ending and Davies said that he "can't bear that there could have been a better ending than we actually transmitted".

Davies said that he attempted to make Jackson Lake's companion Rosita a combination of Rose and Martha so that she felt like a companion before she had done anything.

=== Locations ===
Filming for this episode was conducted in April 2008 at Gloucester Cathedral, St Woolos Cemetery in Newport and the streets of Gloucester, where shooting was hampered by up to 1,000 onlookers. The main setting of Torchwood, their Torchwood Hub was also redesigned and used as the workshop for the children.

=== Casting ===
David Morrissey is the main guest star, playing "a character called The Doctor – a man who believes himself to be a Time Lord". He was influenced in his performance by previous Doctor actors William Hartnell, Patrick Troughton and Tom Baker, as he believed there was "a truth" to their performances because they "never saw [Doctor Who] as a genre show or a children's show". He is joined by Velile Tshabalala as Rosita, the companion to Morrissey's "Doctor", whom Russell T Davies describes as "probably cleverer than the two of them [the Doctors] put together". For Tshabalala, the character came naturally because her "feisty cockney girl" characterization was very "close to home" for her.

Dervla Kirwan plays Mercy Hartigan, who Russell T Davies describes in the episode's podcast commentary as "dark a villain as you will ever have". A lot of her characterization goes unstated, but Russell discussed it in long conversations with Dervla Kirwan and fellow executive producer Julie Gardner. Davies characterizes Miss Hartigan as "a victim of abuse", for whom the subtext suggests a "terrible backstory" which is symptomatic of her being "part of [this] Victorian Age." Davies describes this as being "a powerless woman who's been in servitude or far worse all her life", but holds his tongue from saying her precise profession, relaying: "I'm talking quite discreetly around this because there are children listening and watching and there's only so far I should go." He does however explain that "She's had terrible things done to her" which is responsible for her "really twisted character where she sexualizes everything." In terms of costume, "she wears red" because "everything's inflammatory with her". "And in the end, actually" Davies discusses how to escape her male oppression she "becomes a man, she becomes the CyberKing. She has to go through this extraordinary process because she's so damaged." Kirwan would later go on to voice Miss Quill, replacing the original actress Katherine Kelly, in the audio dramas of the spin-off Class produced by Big Finish Productions in 2019.

=== Design ===
Millennium FX's Neil Gorton's original design for the Cybershade took the existing Cyberman design and "refurbished" it by adding rivets and a copper finish. The design was cost-effective but Russell T Davies did not believe it was the right approach. He sketched a new design for the Cybershade that was "a crude version of a Cyberman, all angular and blocky, with its trademark handlebars set at a jaunty angle and shrouded in flowing black robes". Gorton used Davies' sketch to create a fiberglass mask that the Cybershade actors wore over their heads. Costume designer Louise Page made the flowing robes, that were "light enough to not restrict movement" to complete the Cybershade costume. A new head design for the Cyber Leader was also introduced, sporting a black face and handles and an exposed brain similar to that of the Cyber Controller from "The Age of Steel" (2006).

Originally, Gardner relayed that there was a widespread dissatisfaction with Hartigan's CyberKing crown. The original helmet, he remarked "was like the Cyberwoman's head from Torchwood" (referring to the episode "Cyberwoman"), literally "a Cyberman's head on Dervla Kirwan" or "as if Dervla Kirwan decided to go to a [fancy dress] party as a Cyberman." Davies' response was "Oh my lord, no." The production team however worked hard, and in two days produced the final headpiece seen in the episode which Davies described as "beautiful", because it's "Victorian and it fits the design." In the scene after the headpiece is placed on her, Dervla wore black contact lenses and SFX company The Mill helped to get rid of "any traces of white" in post-production.

== Broadcast ==
Preliminary figures show that the episode had a viewing audience of 11.71 million during its original airing, with a peak at 12.58 million viewers, and a 50.5% share of the 18:00 timeslot it was shown. It was the second most watched programme of Christmas Day 2008, behind Wallace and Gromit's A Matter of Loaf and Death. Final viewing figures show an audience of 13.1 million viewers.

The episode had an Appreciation Index figure of 86 (considered Excellent), making it the second most-enjoyed programme on mainstream television on Christmas Day. The only programme to score higher was A Matter of Loaf and Death, which scored 88.

In Australia, the ABC aired the episode on 25 January 2009 from 7:30pm. In Canada, Space aired the special instead of CBC on 14 March 2009. BBC America aired the special in United States on 27 June 2009.

Although The Next Doctor was not filmed in HD, the BBC aired it on BBC One HD Thursday 30 December 2010. They up-scaled the program to HD, and it also included Dolby Surround sound. This is the third Doctor Who episode that has been up-scaled in the United Kingdom.

== Home media ==
=== DVD release ===
Unfinished cover art of The Next Doctor DVD. This version lacked the hot air balloon in the top right corner, which was considered a spoiler by the production team and so a balloon-free version of the cover was released to the web prior to broadcast. The final version of the cover includes the balloon.

The DVD was released in the United Kingdom on 19 January 2009. The DVD features a full set of end credits newly produced in a "cinematic" format to replace the broadcast version. There is an hour of special features on the disc, including the full Doctor Who Confidential for the episode, a cut-down edition of the Doctor Who Prom hosted by Freema Agyeman and the seven-minute mini-episode "Music of the Spheres". The DVD was re-released on 11 January 2010 in the boxset 'The Complete Specials', packaged with the remainder of the 2008–10 specials.

The ten Christmas specials between "The Christmas Invasion" and "Last Christmas" inclusive were released in a boxset titled Doctor Who – The 10 Christmas Specials on 19 October 2015.

=== Blu-ray release ===
Although "The Next Doctor" was not filmed in High Definition, it was up-scaled for Blu-ray, with DTS HD 5.1 Audio, and released as part of the 2008–2010 Specials boxset, for Blu-ray, entitled "Doctor Who: The Complete Specials".

== Soundtrack ==
Selected pieces of score from this special, as composed by Murray Gold, were included in the specials soundtrack on 4 October 2010, released by Silva Screen Records.

== Awards ==
In April 2010, it was nominated for the Hugo Award for Best Dramatic Presentation, Short Form, along with "Planet of the Dead". Both lost out to "The Waters of Mars". It was nominated for the 2008 VES Award for Outstanding Visual Effects in a Broadcast Miniseries, Movie or Special, losing to John Adams.
