= Ernie Vincze =

Hungarian-born British cinematographer (1942–2024)

Ernest Vincze
- Born: 25 November 1942; Budapest, Hungary
- Died: 6 October 2024 (aged 81)
- Citizenship: Hungarian; British
- Occupation: Cinematographer
- Known for: Doctor Who

Ernest Vincze (25 November 1942 – 6 October 2024) was a Hungarian-born British film and television cinematographer.

== Life and career ==
Vincze was born in Budapest, Hungary on 25 November 1942.

Among his credits are the 1986 film Biggles, the television film Escape from Sobibor and the Sean Penn and Madonna vehicle Shanghai Surprise. In 2005 he became the director of photography on the new series of Doctor Who, photographing the entire first series. He returned for the second series, in its first, third and fifth production blocks (Blocks Two, Four and Six were helmed by Rory Taylor).

Vincze lived for most of his life in London. He died on 6 October 2024, at the age of 81.
