= Tisha Martin =

British singer (born 1984)

Tisha Monique
- Born: Tisha Monique Martin; 20 November 1984 (age 41); London, England
- Occupations: Singer; songwriter
- Years active: 2000–present
- Musical career
- Genres: Pop; electropop; trip hop
- Instrument: Vocals
- Labels: Sony Music
- Member of: The 411

Tisha Monique is a British singer and actress, best known for being a member of the R&B band The 411. As an actress, she is best known as Missy in Kerching!, and Ella in The Basil Brush Show.

== Early life ==
Martin attended the Sylvia Young Theatre School in London.

== Career ==
Martin first appeared on British television in the CBBC sitcom Kerching! as the character Missy Lewis. She played the sister of the main character, Taj. Missy worked in the Chill Out Grill as one of the idle waitresses who were rude to the customers and did little work as they spent most of their time texting or talking on their mobiles.

Her next part was in the also CBBC sitcom The Basil Brush Show, where she played the character of Ella, Molly's next door neighbour. Presently, Martin is a reader on Jackanory Junior every Sunday on CBeebies.

In 2003 Martin joined the girl group The 411 who enjoyed moderate success releasing three singles, two of which reached the UK top 5 and 1 album before disbanding in 2008, however stating they would potentially reform in the future if the time was right.

On 30 March 2020 Martin released her debut single "Leave Your Mind" and continues to record and perform.

On 8 December 2021 it was confirmed that The 411 would reform and perform at ‘Mighty Hoopla’ in June 2022. On 12 May 2022 Monique released her debut EP.

== Discography ==
=== Extended plays ===
List of extended plays
| Title | Album details |
|---|---|
| Layers: The Introduction | Released: 12 May 2022; Label: Pelmar Music; Formats: Digital download |

=== Promotional singles ===
List of promotional singles
| Title | Year | Album |
|---|---|---|
| "Leave Your Mind" (acoustic version) | 2020 | Non-album singles |
| "You" | 2022 | Layers: The Introduction |
| "Love To Me" | 2022 | Layers: The Introduction |
