= Blink (Doctor Who) =

186 – "Blink"
- Doctor Who episode
- Sally Sparrow (Carey Mulligan), unaware she is being watched by the statue-like Weeping Angels

Cast
- Doctor: David Tennant – Tenth Doctor
- Companion: Freema Agyeman – Martha Jones
- Others: Carey Mulligan – Sally Sparrow; Lucy Gaskell – Kathy Nightingale; Finlay Robertson – Larry Nightingale; Richard Cant – Malcolm Wainwright; Michael Obiora – DI Billy Shipton; Louis Mahoney – Old Billy; Thomas Nelstrop – Ben Wainwright; Ian Boldsworth – Banto; Ray Sawyer – Desk Sergeant; Aga Blonska, Elen Thomas – Weeping Angel (uncredited)

Production
- Directed by: Hettie Macdonald
- Written by: Steven Moffat
- Based on: "'What I Did on My Christmas Holidays' By Sally Sparrow" by Steven Moffat
- Produced by: Phil Collinson
- Executive producers: Russell T Davies; Julie Gardner
- Music by: Murray Gold
- Production code: 3.10
- Series: Series 3
- Running time: 45 minutes
- First broadcast: 9 June 2007

Chronology
← Preceded by "The Family of Blood"	Followed by → "Utopia"

"Blink" is the tenth episode of the third series of the British science fiction television series Doctor Who. It was first broadcast on 9 June 2007 on BBC One. The episode was directed by Hettie MacDonald and written by Steven Moffat. The episode is based on a previous short story written by Moffat for the 2006 Doctor Who Annual, titled "'What I Did on My Christmas Holidays' By Sally Sparrow".

In the episode, the Tenth Doctor—a time travelling alien played by David Tennant—is trapped in 1969 and tries to communicate with a young woman in 2007, Sally Sparrow (Carey Mulligan), to prevent the statue-like Weeping Angels from taking control of the TARDIS. Sparrow and her best friend's brother, Larry Nightingale (Finlay Robertson), must unravel a set of cryptic clues sent through time by the marooned Doctor, left in DVD Easter eggs.

Both the Doctor and his companion Martha Jones, played by Freema Agyeman, are on screen for little of this episode, and another episode was being filmed simultaneously; "Blink" is consequently sometimes referred to by fans as a "Doctor-lite" episode. The scenes at Wester Drumlins were shot in a derelict house in Newport. To create the angels, two actresses wore makeup and prosthetics. The episode was seen by 6.62 million viewers in the United Kingdom.

"Blink" received widespread praise, and is widely considered to be one of the best episodes of the show. Moffat won the BAFTA Craft and BAFTA Cymru awards for Best Writer, and the Hugo Award for Best Dramatic Presentation, Short Form; while for her single performance in the series, Mulligan won the Constellation Award for Best Female Performance in a 2007 Science Fiction Television Episode. In 2009 the episode was voted the second-best Doctor Who story ever by readers of Doctor Who Magazine.

== Plot ==
In 2007, Sally Sparrow, intrigued by a message written to her under peeling wallpaper about "the Weeping Angel", explores the abandoned house Wester Drumlins with her friend Kathy Nightingale. Kathy is sent back in time to 1920 by an angel statue. At that moment, Kathy's grandson Malcolm delivers to the house a message from 1987 about the long life Kathy led. Before leaving, Sally takes a Yale key hanging from the hand of a statue. Sally visits Kathy's brother Larry at work to tell him Kathy loves him. Larry explains that he has been documenting an Easter egg in seventeen different DVDs containing a video message of a man having half of a conversation with the viewer. Larry gives Sally a list of the DVDs. Four statues follow Sally to the police station, where they take an impounded fake police box and send DI Billy Shipton back to 1969. The man in the Easter egg, a time traveller called the Tenth Doctor, has also been sent to the past, and asks Billy to relay a message decades later. Billy puts the Easter egg on the DVDs. In 2007, a much older Billy phones Sally to visit him on his deathbed in the hospital. Before he dies, Billy instructs Sally to look at the list. The list is Sally's own DVD collection.

External videos
- Sally and Larry watch the Doctor's Easter Egg at the Wester Drumlins from official BBC Doctor Who Channel

Sally and Larry return to the house and play the Easter egg on a portable DVD player. Sally discovers she can converse with the Doctor in 1969, as he possesses a copy of the complete transcript that Larry is currently compiling. The Doctor explains that aliens called Weeping Angels turn to stone statues when any living creature observes them. He fears they are seeking the vast reserves of time energy in the police box, which is his time machine the TARDIS.

A Weeping Angel pursues Sally and Larry to the basement where the TARDIS is. Sally and Larry use the Yale key to hide inside. Larry inserts a now-glowing DVD, which also functions as a control disk, in the console's DVD player. The ship returns to the Doctor, while leaving Sally and Larry behind. The Weeping Angels standing around the TARDIS get tricked into looking at each other and are permanently frozen. A year later, Sally meets the Doctor prior to his being stuck in 1969. She hands the Doctor the transcript, and warns that he will need it.

== Production ==
=== Writing ===
You have to remember that being scared of the dark and being scared of monsters is basically a childish impulse. There's always something of the nursery about horror....Adults never quite grow out of their childhood fears. They just belong in a different part of our heads. Doctor Who isn't a childish programme, but it is childlike: it's a programme for children. And many, many adults who watch and love it watch it as that: as something like Harry Potter.

— Steven Moffat on writing horror fiction for Doctor Who.

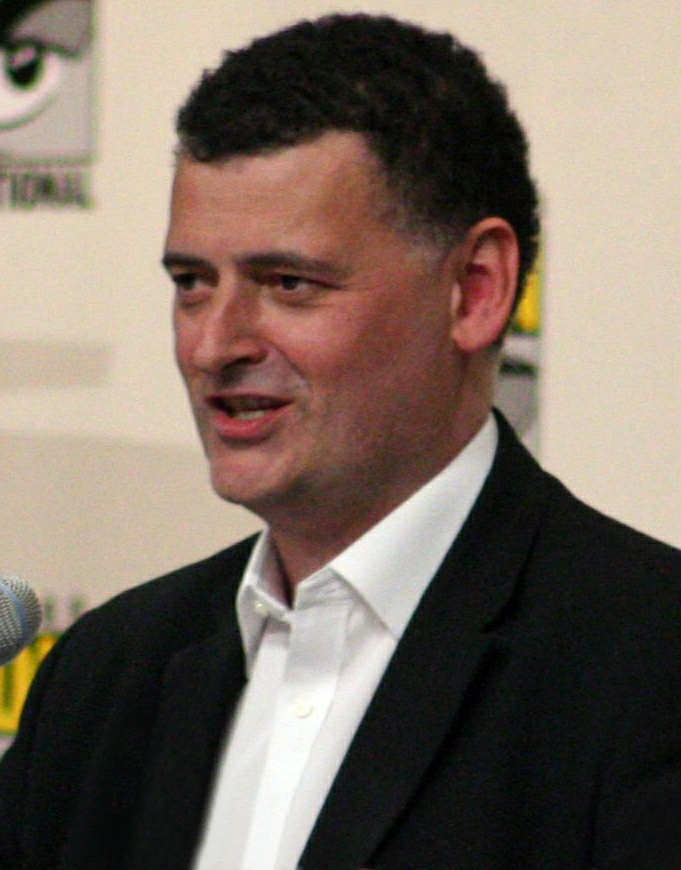
The episode was written by Steven Moffat.

"Blink" was written by Steven Moffat. Part of the story for "Blink" is based on Moffat's Ninth Doctor short story from the Doctor Who Annual 2006 called "'What I Did on My Christmas Holidays' by Sally Sparrow". The short story is presented as a homework essay from Sally, though only 12 years old, who encounters evidence of the Doctor's presence from the past in her aunt's house while visiting. "What I Did" includes several elements that are reused in "Blink", including messages under the wallpaper and an ontological paradox involving a conversation between Sally and the Doctor, prerecorded on a video cassette, based on a written transcript—the essay itself. Instead of the Weeping Angels, "What I Did" features the Doctor and the TARDIS inadvertently separated twenty years in time by a fault in the time machine, and the Doctor is able to instruct Sally how to bring it back to him in the past.

Moffat had held the idea of the Weeping Angels since seeing an angel statue in a graveyard whilst on a family holiday, and had planned to use them for the next series in the episodes that became "Silence in the Library" and "Forest of the Dead". After withdrawing from the writing of series three's first two-part story—Helen Raynor took over these episodes, writing "Daleks in Manhattan" and "Evolution of the Daleks"—Moffat volunteered to write the series' Doctor-lite episode and opted to use the Weeping Angels in what would become "Blink". Moffat was also inspired to write the episode based on the popular children's game Statues, which he always found "frightening". Murray Gold, the composer for the series, later compared the creatures to the moving ghostly topiary animals in Stephen King's 1977 horror novel The Shining.

"Blink" is the third story of the revived series to be adapted for television by the same writer from a piece of their spin-off writing. It follows the "Human Nature" and "The Family of Blood" story arc, which was adapted by Paul Cornell from his 1995 novel Human Nature; and "Dalek", which used the basic premise as well as several scenes and lines of dialogue adapted by Robert Shearman from his 2003 audio drama Jubilee. "Blink" is referred to as a "Doctor-Lite" episode because the Doctor and his companion have very little screen time. This allowed two episodes to be filmed simultaneously, a process known as "double banking". The practice began with the 2006 entry "Love & Monsters", and continued for episodes such as "Turn Left", "Midnight", and "The Girl Who Waited". Moffat stated that he felt relaxed when he was writing the script for "Blink", for if it proved to be unpopular, he could blame the "Doctor-lite" structure of the episode. Due to the show's tight schedule, "Blink" had only one script meeting.

=== Filming ===
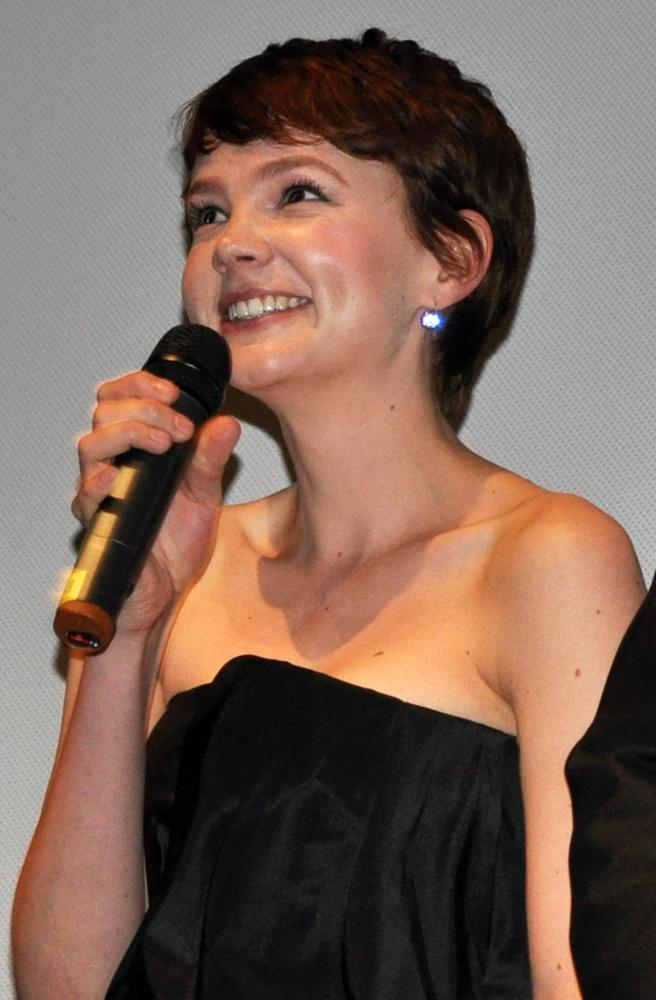
Actress Carey Mulligan (seen here in 2009) appeared in the episode as Sally Sparrow.

"Blink" was directed by Hettie MacDonald, making her the first female director of a Doctor Who episode since the Sixth Doctor serial The Mark of the Rani. Russell T Davies, the series' executive producer, later noted that, due to MacDonald's work, the episode included some of "the most beautiful [visuals] we've ever had". British actress Carey Mulligan was chosen to play Sally Sparrow; Mulligan was reportedly ecstatic to have been cast in the series. She was initially concerned with the fact that Tennant would have little screen time, but after the episode aired was very pleased with the final result.

Location shooting for scenes set at the Police Station Garage took place at the Coal Exchange and Mount Stuart Square, Cardiff Bay on 21 November 2006. Fields House, located in Newport, filled in for Wester Drumlins. The house was already abandoned and falling into disrepair when the filming crews arrived. Moffat noted that "very little of it was tarted up" for the shoot; Moffat later called the location "the creepiest house" he had ever seen. The name was taken from a previous residence that Moffat lived in during the late 1990s. Larry describes the residence as "Scooby-Doo's house", a reference to the dilapidated mansions that the Scooby-Doo gang would usually visit. The BBC Fact File for the episode notes that 1969—the year Martha, the Doctor and Billy are sent to—is the first year Scooby-Doo, Where Are You! aired.

Originally, the producers considered having Michael Obiora play both the young and old version of Billy Shipton. It was later decided that Obiora in makeup would look too fake, and so Louis Mahoney was cast to play the older version. Initially, Obiora played the role with a London accent; Mahoney had a Gambian accent, and so Obiora had to re-dub his lines to match. Billy mentions that the windows of the TARDIS are the wrong size for a real police box. In 2004, when the first photographs of the new series' TARDIS prop were revealed, there was a vigorous discussion of the box's dimensions on the Outpost Gallifrey Doctor Who discussion forum, in which some fans complained that the prop's windows were too big. Moffat has confirmed that this line is an in-joke aimed at the Outpost Gallifrey forum.

=== Effects ===
Moffat joked that "since I was a kid, I've been thinking of Doctor Who monsters, just now when I do, it costs the art department […] a lot of money". To create the rigid structure of the angels' dresses, prosthetics supervisors Rob Mayor soaked fabric in fibreglass resin, which was then painted over. Although they are never shown moving on screen, all of the Weeping Angels were played by actresses Aga Blonska and Elen Thomas wearing makeup and prosthetics. The actresses wore two distinct masks: one that was more docile looking, and one with fangs bared. Blonska later noted that "I'm partly painted, partly glued into the costume, but it's quite comfortable." Although the actresses were slightly "wobbly" when they stood still, the producers used digital effects to, in essence, freeze the angels on film. Moffat was very pleased with the results, and called them "fantastic". Mulligan later called the effects "so good" and "really creepy".

To create the effect of the Angels rocking the TARDIS Mulligan and Robertson threw themselves around the ship's set. The camera's operator then shook the camera in the opposite direction that Mulligan and Robertson threw themselves. The scene wherein the Doctor talks to Sally via a DVD extra was created by writing a conversation, removing Sally's lines, then having David Tennant record his lines. Moffat felt that this one-way filming made the performance more convincing. Moffat initially wrote placeholder dialogue in the script for the scene where the Doctor tells Sally that he can hear her in the DVD shop, because he knew the lines that appeared would have to play "double duty later on" and be authentic and fresh both times. Gold called the sequences "the heart of the Chinese puzzle".

== Broadcast and reception ==
"Blink" was first broadcast in the United Kingdom on BBC One on 9 June 2007. Overnight ratings showed that it was watched by 6.1 million viewers, which rose to 6.62 once time-shifted viewers were taken into account. The episode was the seventh most watched episode on BBC One for the week ending 10 June and was the lowest-rated episode of Doctor Who's third series. It received an Appreciation Index of 87, considered "excellent". In its initial broadcast, a short clip of a card reading "One Year Later" was shown before the episode's denouement. In the syndicated and the DVD version, this shot has been removed.

A Region 2 DVD containing "Blink" together with the episodes "Human Nature" and "The Family of Blood" was released on 23 July 2007. It was re-released as part of the complete series three DVD on 5 November 2007.

=== Critical reception and accolades ===
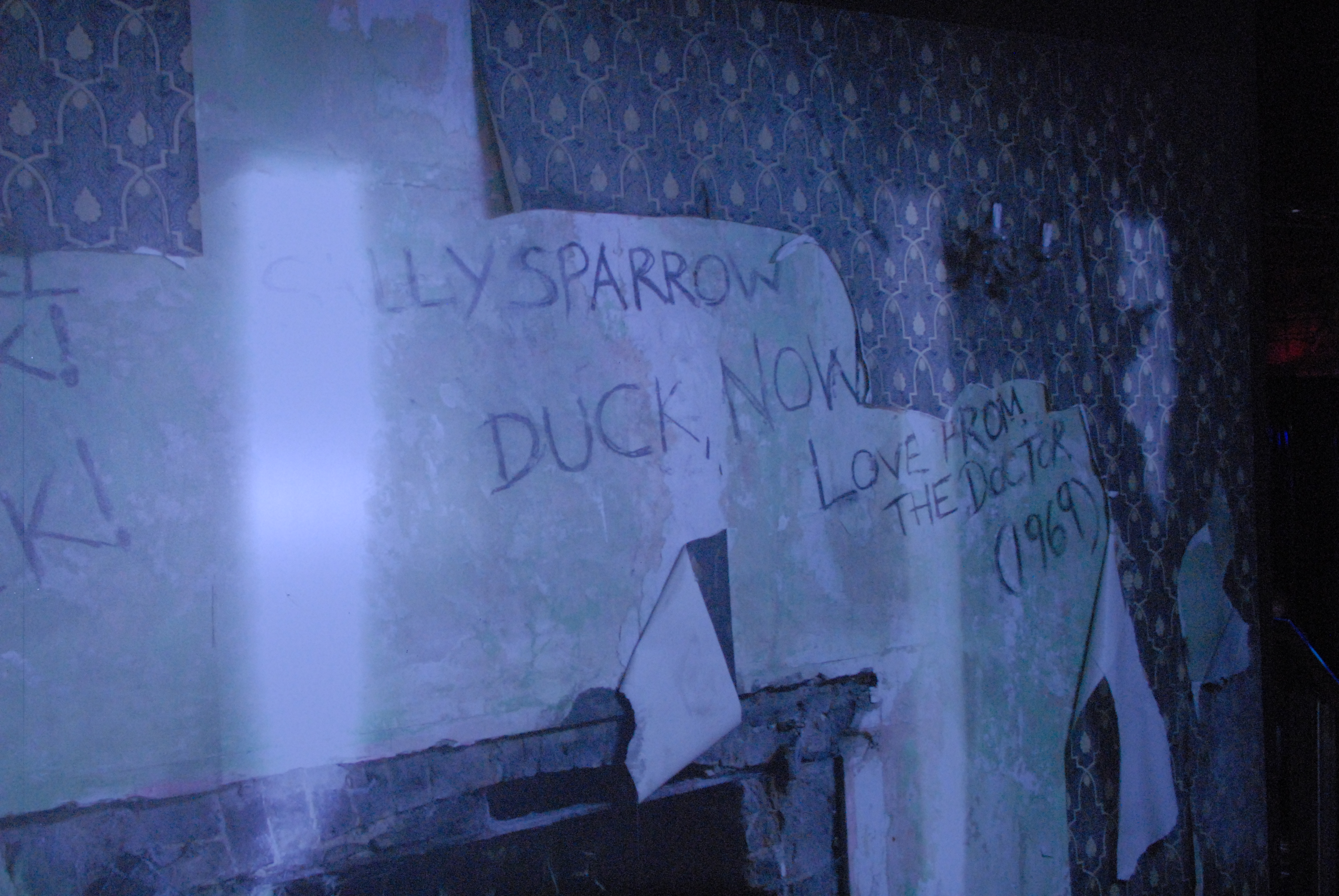
The wall with the Doctor's writing, as shown at the Doctor Who Experience.

"Blink" received positive reviews, with many praising the acting, the script, the level of fear and the Weeping Angels themselves. The Guardian's Stephen Brook called it a "wonderfully creepy episode" that "ultimately made sense" despite "barely featur[ing] the Doctor and Martha". David Bradley of SFX awarded "Blink" five out of five stars, saying that it could have featured any of the previous Doctors and predicted that its "timelessness" would ensure that it would "[go] down as one of the finest, scariest, cleverest Who episodes ever". IGN's Travis Fickett gave the episode 9.1 out of 10, praising the way the audience felt they had known Sally Sparrow for a while, as well as the strength of Mulligan's performance, although he noted that "all of the performances in this episode are exceptional". He concluded that, "it's difficult to believe that so much was accomplished in such a short amount of time. The story of not one, but two relationships was told, several time lines intersected and a new and rather frightening enemy was vanquished without The Doctor ever coming face to face with them". Ross Ruedinger of Slant Magazine believed that the episode was not just the best Doctor Who episode, but also a great episode of the science fiction and horror genre that could allow it to stand alone. He also praised the fear-inducing concept of the Weeping Angels as well as the "tenderness of the story and the characters" which were "quite intricate given how much is going on in these 45 minutes". The Daily Telegraph named the episode one of the best of the show's entire run, noting that, while the Doctor "is somewhat on the periphery here", it "adds to the threat".

Many critics consider the episode one of the strongest during Tennant's time as the Doctor. IGN's Matt Wales named it the sixth best episode of Tennant's tenure, while Sam McPherson of TVOvermind listed it as the second best Tenth Doctor episode. In 2011, before the second half of the sixth series, The Huffington Post labelled "Blink" as one of the five essential episodes for new viewers to watch. The Weeping Angels also received critical praise. In 2009 SFX named the climax with the Weeping Angels advancing on Sally and Larry the scariest moment in Doctor Who's history, describing it as "a terrifying combination of scary concept and perfect direction". The Weeping Angels came in at number three in Neil Gaiman's "Top Ten New Classic Monsters" in Entertainment Weekly, while TV Squad named them the third scariest television characters. They were also rated the third-best "baddie" in Doctor Who by The Daily Telegraph, behind the Nestene Consciousness and Daleks. In 2009 SFX listed the Angels in their list of favourite things of the revival of Doctor Who, writing, "Scariest. Monsters. Ever."

Writer Steven Moffat was awarded the 2008 BAFTA Craft and BAFTA Cymru awards for Best Writer for his work on this episode. "Blink" won the Hugo Award for Best Dramatic Presentation, Short Form, and Carey Mulligan received the Constellation Award for Best Female Performance in a 2007 Science Fiction Television Episode. The episode was nominated for the Nebula Award for Best Script, but lost to Pan's Labyrinth by Guillermo del Toro.

=== Legacy ===
"Blink" received the award for Best Story in the Doctor Who Magazine 2007 Survey. In Doctor Who Magazine's 2009 poll to find the greatest Doctor Who story ever, it came in second place after Peter Davison's final story, The Caves of Androzani. In a 2007 poll conducted by the BBC, taking votes from 2,000 readers of the Doctor Who Adventures magazine, the Weeping Angels were voted the scariest monsters of 2007 with 55% of the vote; the Master and the Daleks took second and third place with 15% and 4% of the vote. In a 2012 poll of over ten thousand respondents conducted by the Radio Times, the Weeping Angels were again voted the best Doctor Who monster with 49.4% of the vote. In Doctor Who Magazine's 2014 fan poll of the greatest episodes of all time, "Blink" again came in second, this time behind the 2013 episode "The Day of the Doctor". In the fifteenth series episode "Lux", which included several fourth wall-breaking concepts, the Doctor meets fans of the show Doctor Who who insist that "Blink" is their favourite episode.

Moffat, after becoming lead writer of the programme, wrote "The Time of Angels" and "Flesh and Stone" for the fifth series as a more action-oriented sequel that brought back the Weeping Angels, believing that good monsters should come back with a different style of story. They also returned in "The Angels Take Manhattan" from the show's seventh series , featured in the mini-episode, "Good as Gold", written by children for a Blue Peter contest and have made cameo appearances in the episodes "The God Complex", "The Time of the Doctor", "Hell Bent", "Revolution of the Daleks" and in the finale to the first series of the Doctor Who spin-off, Class. They are also featured in the New Series Adventures novel Touched by an Angel by Jonathan Morris. They returned to face the Thirteenth Doctor in series 13, Flux.

A line spoken by the Doctor, "The angels have the phone box", is rhetorically repeated by Larry and prompts him to say "I've got that on a T-shirt". As expected by Moffat and Gold, this led online retailers such as ThinkGeek, and Zazzle, among others, to offer versions of such a product for sale. In addition, the "wibbly-wobbly timey-wimey" line has been used to describe several of Moffat's complex time travel stories, such as "Let's Kill Hitler" and "The Big Bang". The line was also referenced in the first episode of the fifth series, "The Eleventh Hour", when the Eleventh Doctor (Matt Smith) scans the crack in young Amelia Pond's (Caitlin Blackwood) wall with his sonic screwdriver. BBC America created a series of four specials prior to the seventh series premiere of Doctor Who, including one entitled "The Timey-Wimey Stuff of Doctor Who".

British "Timelord rock" band Chameleon Circuit, composed of YouTube bloggers Alex Day and Charlotte McDonnell among others, wrote a song about the episode, also entitled "Blink", and released it on their debut eponymous album.
