= Banglatown Banquet =

2006 television film directed by Hettie MacDonald

- Promotional poster
- Genre: Drama
- Written by: Tanika Gupta
- Directed by: Hettie MacDonald
- Country of origin: United Kingdom
- Original language: English

Production
- Executive producer: Will Trotter
- Producers: Tessa Finch; Sam Hill; Sally Woodward Gentle
- Running time: 50 minutes
- Production company: BBC Films

Original release
- Network: BBC Two
- Release: 25 March 2006

Banglatown Banquet is a 2006 British television drama film directed by Hettie MacDonald, written by Tanika Gupta, and stars Shabana Azmi, Shobu Kapoor and Shelly King. The film is about a middle-aged Bangladeshi woman whose life is turned upside down when her husband returns from Bangladesh with a pregnant teenage bride. It was broadcast by BBC Two on 25 March 2006.

== Plot ==
Sofia (Shabana Azmi) is a disillusioned Bangladeshi woman in her 50s who has lived in a council tenement block near Brick Lane since coming to England as a young bride. Her elderly Bangladeshi husband Shafiq (Renu Setna) feeling marginalised by his spouse's attendance of yoga classes, goes back to Bangladesh for a holiday and returns after a year with a pregnant teenage bride.

Divorce is severely frowned upon by the local community and Sofia feels she has to stay with her husband, however, she is far from sure if she can live with these new marital arrangements. Sofia decides not to put up with the humiliation of this new lodger and opts instead for a divorce.

Aided by her trendy daughter Afshan (Preeya Kalidas), Sofia weighs up her options and comes to the decision on a women's community-centre day trip to a stately home with Joolie (Shobu Kapoor) and Nazreen (Shelley King), where she chances upon the ghost of an oppressed English lady of the manor.

== Cast ==
- Shabana Azmi as Sofia
- Shobu Kapoor as Joolie
- Shelley King as Nazreen
- Riz Ahmed as Razual
- Sam Dastor as Tariq
- Gerard Horan as Rocky
- Ronny Jhutti as Zubin
- Preeya Kalidas as Afshan
- Emil Marwa as Ali
- Renu Setna as Shafiq
- Rakhee Thakrar as Rozena

== Production and themes ==
Banglatown Banquet was written by Tanika Gupta, and stars Shobu Kapoor and Shelly King. The scenes in the stately home were shot in Ragley Hall in Alcester, Warwickshire.

The drama is about middle-aged Muslim Bangladeshi women struggling for their freedom who leave the familiarity of their Bangladeshi community and set out on a voyage of discovery.

== Broadcast and reception ==
Banglatown Banquet was broadcast by BBC Two as part of A Night on Brick Lane and was preceded by the documentary Brick Lane on 25 March 2006 (the day before Bangladesh Independence Day).

Andrew Billen of the New Statesman said of the drama "like the documentary, it was a little too heart-warming for its own good." The jury of Prix Europa called the film "A warm, funny, positive and intelligent film... A drama full of respect for the dignity and independence of women." The BBC called it a "thought-provoking drama".

== Awards ==
Year	Award	Category	Result
2006	Prix Europa	TV Fiction Special Commendation	Won

== See also ==
- Brick Lane
- British Bangladeshi
