= Something More =

Something More may refer to:

== Music ==
- Something More!, a 1964 Broadway musical with music by Sammy Fain

=== Albums ===
- Something More (Altars album), 2013
- Something More (Ginny Owens album), 2002

=== Songs ===
- "Something More" (Secondhand Serenade song), 2010
- "Something More" (Sugarland song), 2005
- "Something More" (Train song), 2001
- "Something More", by Aly & AJ from their 2016 album Into the Rush
- "Something More", by Chapterhouse from their 1991 album Whirlpool
- "Something More", by Ryan Malcolm, from his 2003 album Home
- "Something More", by Róisín Murphy from the 2020 album Róisín Machine

== Other uses ==
- "Something More", a 1992 short story by Andrzej Sapkowski
- Something More (1999 film), a film starring Michael A. Goorjian
- Something More (2003 film), a film directed by Devon Gummersall
- Something More (novel), a 2001 novel by Paul Cornell
- Something More (radio program), commenced in 2015
