= Susie Liggat =

British film and television producer

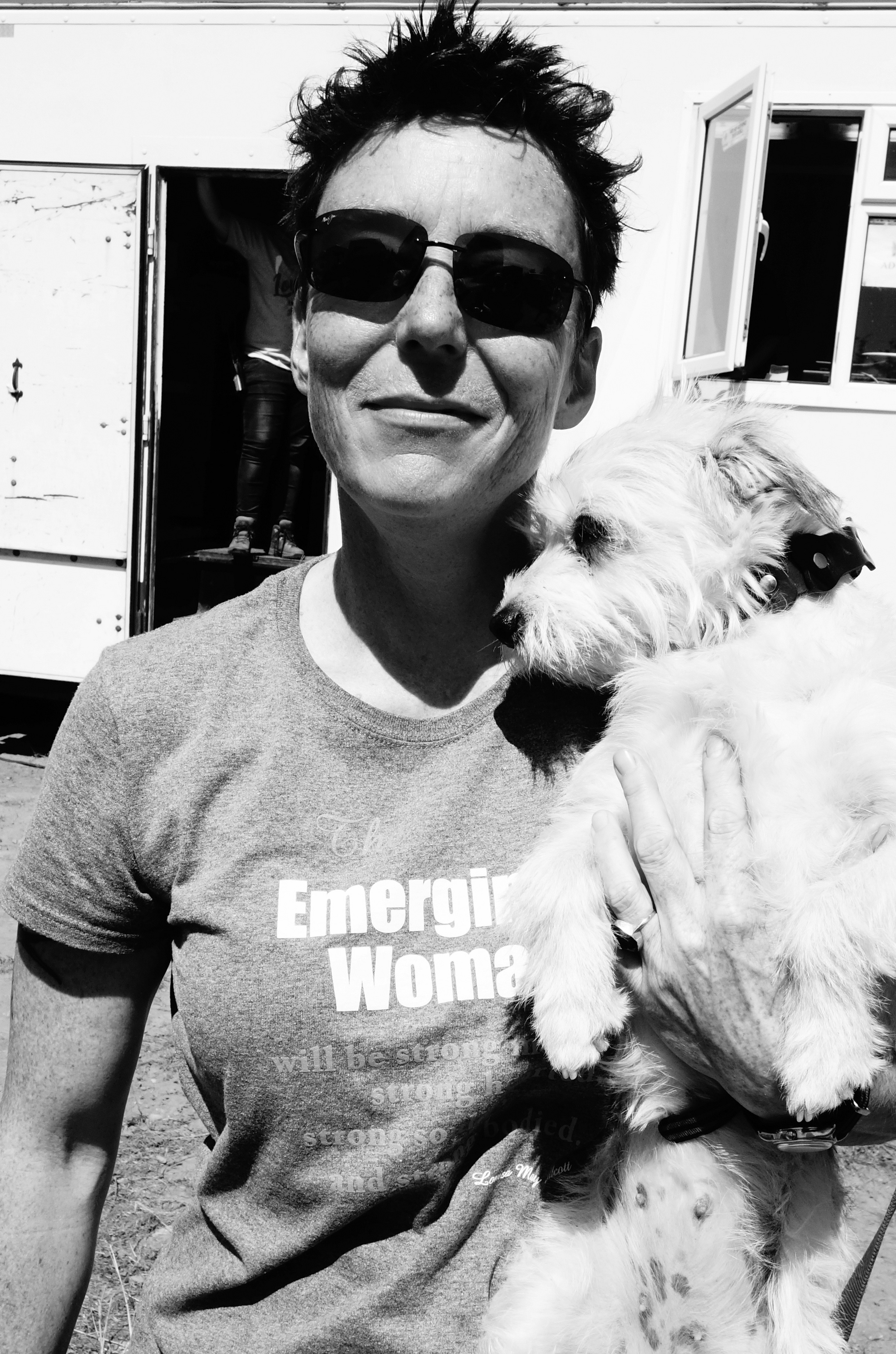
- Liggat in June 2017
- Born: Susie Liggat; London, England
- Occupations: Television producer; film producer; executive producer
- Years active: 1987–present
- Notable work: Doctor Who; Mapp & Lucia; Little Women; Giri/Haji

Susie Liggat is a British television and film producer and executive producer. She has worked in independent film and high end television drama as well as working as Head of Physical Production at the UK Film Council.

She is currently the series producer for the upcoming Netflix drama, Bodies, an eight part miniseries based on Si Spencer's graphic novel with the same title.

== Career ==
Her career had previously been as a first assistant director, in which capacity she worked on popular series such as Teachers, Black Books, and Casanova, until she became a producer in 2006.

She produced Invasion of the Bane, the pilot episode of The Sarah Jane Adventures, a spin-off from Doctor Who, on which she had worked as a first assistant director.

During the production of the third series of Doctor Who, Liggat produced one filming block (the two-parter "Human Nature"/"The Family of Blood") as holiday relief for regular producer Phil Collinson. Liggat produced five episodes of the fourth series: "Planet of the Ood", "The Sontaran Strategem", "The Poison Sky", "The Unicorn and the Wasp" and "Turn Left". She also produced the 2008 Christmas special, entitled "The Next Doctor".

She has produced Blood and Oil for BBC2 - a 2 x 90 mini drama set in the Nigerian Delta Oil fields, House of Anubis, The Cafe x 2, Sherlock, and in 2014 she produced Mapp & Lucia for BBC One and then You, Me and the Apocalypse for NBC / Sky.

== Filmography ==
=== As producer ===
Year	Title	Distributor	Additional Info
2007	The Sarah Jane Adventures		
2007–2008	Doctor Who		
2010	Blood and Oil		
2011	House of Anubis		
2011	Sugartown		
2011–2013	The Cafe		
2013	The Tractate Middoth		
2013	Sherlock		
2014	Mapp & Lucia		
2015	You, Me and the Apocalypse		
2017	Fortitude		
2017	Little Women		
2019	Giri/Haji		
2023	Bodies		
2025	Black Mirror	Netflix	Episode: "Hotel Reverie"

=== As First Assistant Director ===
Year	Title	Distributor	Additional Info
1994	Just Us		Directed by Kay Mellor
1995–1996	Wycliffe		
1996	Beautiful Thing		Directed by Hettie Macdonald
1997	Mrs. Dalloway		
1998	Our Mutual Friend		
1999	The Last Yellow		
2001	Crush		
2001	Hotel		
2002	The Abduction Club		
2003	Burn It		
2003	Rockface		
2003	Teachers		
2004	Black Books		
2005	Casanova		
2006	Doctor Who		

=== As Executive Producer ===
Year	Title	Distributor
2003	Blind Flight	
2012	Cockneys vs Zombies	
2022	The Thief, His Wife and the Canoe	
