= Brick Lane (disambiguation) =

Brick Lane is a street and area in the East End of London, England.

Brick Lane may also refer to:

- Brick Lane (novel), a novel by Monica Ali
- Brick Lane (2007 film), a British feature film based on Monica Ali's novel
- Brick Lane (2006 film), a British documentary directed and produced by Minoo Bhatia
