= Human Nature (novel) =

1995 novel by Paul Cornell

- Author: Paul Cornell
- Cover artist: Bill Donohoe
- Series: Doctor Who book: Virgin New Adventures
- Release number: 38
- Subject: Featuring: Seventh Doctor; Bernice Summerfield
- Publisher: Virgin Books
- Publication date: May 1995
- Pages: 255
- ISBN: 0-426-20443-3
- Preceded by: Sanctuary
- Followed by: Original Sin

Human Nature is an original novel written by Paul Cornell, from a plot by Cornell and Kate Orman, and based on the long-running British science fiction television series Doctor Who. The work began as fan fiction.

The novel was later serialised in e-book form on the BBC Doctor Who website, but was removed from the site in 2010. A prelude to the novel, also penned by Cornell, appeared in Doctor Who Magazine #226, and was also available on the BBC website. It was later adapted into a two-part episode, "Human Nature" and "The Family of Blood" for series 3 of the revival in 2007.

== Plot ==
Bernice Summerfield is grieving since the death of Guy de Carnac (as seen in the previous novel, Sanctuary). The Seventh Doctor takes her to a market on a planet called Crex in the Augon system. He quickly sets off, telling her he'll be back in an hour, and Benny finds a pub where she orders a beer and finds a group of female, human, drinking-partners. After Benny's had several drinks with them, the Doctor arrives and places a patch on her cheek — a pad that disperses the alcohol in her system. He tells her that they need to leave immediately, and leads her back to the TARDIS. He hands her a scroll, and tells her he'll see her in three months; and then collapses.

Meanwhile, the genesmith Laylock meets with his associates. They plan to follow the Doctor. In a long and dark room, a teenager named Tim awakens from a dream; having had a premonition that everyone will die.

Unable to understand Benny's grief on a human level, the Doctor has purchased a device which alters his biodata; transforming him into a human named Dr. John Smith. Smith lives as a history teacher at a public school in 1914 England, and falls in love with a fellow teacher named Joan. However, when alien Aubertides - hoping to acquire Time Lord abilities - attack the school, Smith sacrifices himself and becomes the Doctor once more; as a Time Lord, he is unable to love Joan in the way that the human John Smith did.

== Reception ==
In a poll conducted by Doctor Who Magazine to mark the 35th anniversary of Doctor Who (#265, June 1998), Human Nature was voted the readership's favourite novel of the New Adventures series.

== Television adaptation ==
Cornell adapted his own work for a two-part story in the 2007 TV series of Doctor Who. The first episode is titled "Human Nature" and the second, "The Family of Blood". The names of many of the human characters in the novel are reused for characters in the television story, which is also set in a boys' school shortly before World War I. The Family of Blood have some resemblance to the descriptions of the antagonists in the novel, though they have different names and have possessed humans from the area rather than being shapeshifters. Finally, the roles of the Seventh Doctor and Benny are replaced by the Tenth Doctor and Martha Jones respectively.

== Prelude ==
Doctor Who Magazine published preludes to several New Adventures. The prelude to Human Nature appeared in issue 226. According to Cornell, he wrote his novel's plots with these preludes in mind.

== Sequels ==
During the COVID-19 pandemic, several well-regarded episodes of the show were broadcast with live internet commentary from the writers, often paired with new content. Cornell released three interlinked short stories, The Shadow Passes, Shadow of a Doubt, and The Shadow in the Mirror that collectively functioned as a sequel to both the novel and its television adaptation.

== See also ==
- Time Lords - History
- The Doctor and romance
