= Tanika Gupta =

English playwright, born 1963

Tanika Gupta MBE, FRSL
- Born: 1 December 1963 (age 62); Chiswick, Hounslow, London, England
- Education: Mill Hill School; Oxford University
- Occupations: Playwright, screenwriter
- Years active: 1998–present
- Known for: Theatre, television
- Style: Drama, radio drama, screenplay
- Spouse: David Archer (m. 1988)
- Children: 3
- Relatives: Dinesh Chandra Gupta (maternal great uncle)
- Website: tanikagupta.com

Tanika Gupta MBE FRSL (born 1 December 1963) is a British playwright. Apart from her work for the theatre, she has also written scripts for television, film and radio plays.

== Early life ==
Tanika Gupta was born in London to immigrant parents from Kolkata, India, where her family had their origins. As a child, Gupta performed Tagore dance dramas with her parents. Her mother Gairika Gupta was an Indian classically trained dancer, and her father Tapan Gupta was a singer. The Indian revolutionary Dinesh Gupta was her great-uncle.

After attending Copthall Comprehensive School in London and then Mill Hill School for her A-levels, Gupta graduated from Oxford University with a Modern History degree. After Oxford, her political commitment found expression in her work for an Asian women's refuge in Manchester. In 1988, she married David Archer, an anti-poverty activist and ActionAid's current Head of Tax Justice and Public Services, whom she met at university. She and her husband then moved to London where Gupta was initially a community worker in Islington, writing in her spare time.

== Career ==
Over the past 25 years Gupta has written more than 25 stage plays that have been produced in major theatres across the UK. She has also written 30 radio plays for the BBC and several original television dramas, as well as scripts for EastEnders, Grange Hill and The Bill. The Waiting Room (produced for the National Theatre in 2000) was an early career highpoint with Indian film star Shabana Azmi performing on the stage in London for the first time.

Gupta's 2013 play The Empress, about Abdul Karim and Queen Victoria, opened in Stratford upon Avon and is now on the GCSE curriculum along with her adaptation of Ibsen's A Doll's House, which was first performed at Hammersmith Lyric in 2018. Writing in The Daily Telegraph, Dominic Cavendish praised The Empress, saying: "This fascinating new theatre production has got 'make this into a movie' written all over it".

Her play Lions and Tigers performed at the Sam Wannamaker in Shakespeare's Globe Theatre tells the remarkable story set in the 1930s of her great-uncle, Dinesh Gupta, an Indian freedom fighter. Lions and Tigers is now published in Methuen's series of Modern Classics. Praise for Lions and Tigers singled out the "intimate storytelling, where Gupta's writing is at its most playful and potent" for particular note. Other notable plays include Sugar Mummies (Royal Court Theatre, 2006); Gladiator Games (Sheffield Crucible Theatre, 2006); Hobson's Choice (Young Vic 2001 and Manchester Royal Exchange 2018). Her most recent productions are Mirror on the Moor (Royal Court Living Newspaper, April 2021), and The Overseas Student (Hammersmith Lyric, June 2021).

== Personal life ==
Gupta and her husband have two daughters, Nandini (born 1991), Niharika (born 1993), and a son Malini (born 2000).

== Works ==
=== Theatre plays ===
Year	Title
1995	Voices on the Wind (NT Studio)
1997	Skeleton (Soho)
1997	A River Sutra (NT Studio / 3 Mill Island)
1998	On The Couch with Enoch (BAC)
2000	The Waiting Room (National Theatre)
2002	Sanctuary (National Theatre)
2002	Inside Out (Arcola)
2003	Hobson's Choice (Young Vic)
2003	Fragile Land (Hampstead)
2004	The Country Wife (Watford)
2006	Gladiator Games (Sheffield Crucible)
2006	Catch (Royal Court)
2006	Sugar Mummies (Royal Court)
2008	Meet The Mukherjees (Bolton Octagon)
2008	White Boy (Soho)
2010	Great Expectations (Watford)
2012	Wah Wah Girls (Saddlers Wells / Peacock Theatre)
2013	Love'N'Stuff (Stratford East)
2013	The Empress (RSC)
2015	Anita and Me (Birmingham Rep)
2016	A Midsummer Night's Dream (dramaturg at The Globe)
2017	Lions and Tigers (Sam Wanamaker Playhouse, London)
2017	A Short History of Tractors in Ukrainian (Hull Truck)
2018	Hobsons's Choice (Royal Exchange)
2019	A Doll's House (Lyric Hammersmith, London)
2019	Red Dust Road (National Theatre Scotland/Edinburgh International Festival)
2019	Hobson's Choice (Manchester Royal Exchange)
2019	Bones (Royal Central School of Speech and Drama)
2021	Mirror on the Moor (Royal Court, London)
2021	The Overseas Student (Lyric Hammersmith, London)
2024	A Tupperware of Ashes (National Theatre, London)

=== Radio plays ===
Year	Title
1991	Asha (BBC Radio 4)
1994	Badal and his Bike (BBC Radio 5)
1994	Kiss Me Quick (BBC Radio 5)
1996	Pankhiraj (BBC Radio 4)
1997	Ananda Sananda (BBC Radio 4)
1997	Kiss Me Quick (BBC Radio 5)
1997	The Bounty Hunter (BBC Radio 4)
1997	Skeleton (BBC Radio 4)
1998	Voices On The Wind (BBC World Service)
1998	Red Oleanders (BBC Radio 3)
1998	Westway (BBC World Service)
1999	Muse of Fusion (BBC Radio 4)
1999	Coat (BBC Radio 4)
1999	Waistland (BBC Radio 4)
1999	The Queen's Retreat (BBC Radio 4)
2000	The Eternal Bubble (BBC World Service)
2000	The Secret (BBC Radio 4)
2000	The Book of Secrets (BBC Radio 4)
2001	Betrayal: The Trial of William Davidson (BBC)
2001	Stowaway (BBC)
2002	A Second Chance (BBC Radio 3)
2003	The Parting (BBC Radio 4)
2004	The God of Small Things (BBC Radio 4)
2005	Chitra (BBC Radio 4)
2008	Rudolpho's Zest (BBC Radio 3)
2008	Silver Street (BBC Asian Network)
2010	Rescue Me (BBC Radio 4)
2012	A Doll's House (BBC Radio 3)
2013	Pather Panchali (BBC Radio 4)
2014	Baby Farming (BBC Radio 3)

=== Filmography ===
Year	Title	Notes	Credit
1995	Flight	TV film	Writer
1995	Bideshi	Short	Writer
1995	Siren Spirits	1 episode: "Bideshi"	Writer
1999	The Fiancée	Short	Writer
2000	EastEnders	4 episodes: inc "17 January 2000"	Writer
1997–2000	Grange Hill	7 episodes: "20:19", "20:20", "21:15", "22.9", "22:10", "23:5", "23:6"	Writer
2001	Crossroads	Unknown episodes	Writer
2001	The Bill	1 episode: "Complicity (Part 2)"	Writer
2002	The Lives of Animals	TV film	Screenplay
2006	Banglatown Banquet	TV film	Screenplay
2010	Non-Resident	Short	Writer
2018	Pritilata	Monologue as part of Snatches series, BBC	Writer

== Awards and recognition ==
In 2008, Gupta was appointed a Member of the Order of the British Empire (MBE) in the 2008 New Year Honours for her services to drama. In June 2016, she was made a Fellow of the Royal Society of Literature. In 2017, she was awarded an Honorary Doctorate of Theatre by the University of Chichester.

In 2018, Gupta was awarded with the James Tait Black Memorial Prize for Drama for her play Lions and Tigers.

- EMMA (BT Ethnic and Multicultural Media Award for Best Television Production) (screenplay), for Flight (1998)
- John Whiting Award, for The Waiting Room (2000)
- Asian Women of Achievement Award (Arts and Culture category) (2003)
- EMMA (BT Ethnic and Multicultural Media Award for Best Play) (adaptation), for Hobson's Choice (2004)
- Laurence Olivier Award for Outstanding Achievement in an Affiliate Theatre, for Fragile Land/Hobson's Choice (2004)
- Amnesty International UK Media Awards (radio play) Chitra (2005)
- Member of the Order of the British Empire in the Birthday Honours (2008)
- BBC Audio Drama Award for Best Adaptation, for A Doll's House (2013)
- Fellow of the Royal Society of Literature (2016)
- James Tait Black Memorial Prize for Drama for Lions and Tigers (2018)

== See also ==
- British Indians
- List of British Indians
