= British Summertime (novel) =

Novel by Paul Cornell

- Cover of Gollancz edition
- Author: Paul Cornell
- Cover artist: 'Blacksheep'
- Language: English
- Genre: Science fiction
- Publisher: Gollancz
- Publication date: 2002
- Publication place: United Kingdom
- Media type: Print (hardcover & paperback)
- Pages: 341
- ISBN: 0-575-07369-1
- OCLC: 49204488

British Summertime is a science fantasy novel by British writer Paul Cornell, first published by Gollancz in 2002. It is Cornell's second (non-tie-in) novel to be published. It is notable for its use of Christian and Gnostic themes; realistic contemporary settings, principally around Bath, Somerset; and complex exploration of time travel.

== Plot ==
Alison Parmeter, a 20-year-old woman living in Bath in 2000, has a near-supernatural power to "read" situations and make deductions based on small clues. She dreams the experiences of Judas Iscariot, and has fears of the "end of the world" since her friend Fran has returned from a caving expedition and discovery of "Golden Men". Her fear is only allayed when she meets Leyton, a British pilot from the year 2129, a world without money or nations and at war with alien "Rods". However, it then transpires (from a theological discussion) that the 2000 that Alison lives in is not identical with Leyton's past. It is gradually revealed that the four "Golden Men" or angels (of whom only Michael and Abaddon are named) are a product of far-future monetary exchange systems, and have altered history to their advantage, always being allied with power and money. The rest of the novel is devoted to subsidiary characters and the resolution of this plot.
