= Sanctuary (McIntee novel) =

1995 novel by David A. McIntee

- Author: David A. McIntee
- Cover artist: Peter Elson
- Series: Doctor Who book: Virgin New Adventures
- Release number: 37
- Subject: Featuring: Seventh Doctor; Bernice
- Publisher: Virgin Books
- Publication date: April 1995
- ISBN: 0-426-20439-5
- Preceded by: Infinite Requiem
- Followed by: Human Nature

Sanctuary is an original novel written by David A. McIntee and based on the long-running British science fiction television series Doctor Who. It features the Seventh Doctor and Bernice. A prelude to the novel, also penned by McIntee, appeared in Doctor Who Magazine #225. The novel was unusual for being a purely historical story in which no science fiction elements appeared beyond the basic premise of the series. Such stories had not appeared in Doctor Who since 1982's Black Orchid, and not regularly since The Highlanders in 1967–68.
