= The Family of Blood =

185b – "The Family of Blood"
- Doctor Who episode

Cast
- Doctor: David Tennant – Tenth Doctor
- Companion: Freema Agyeman – Martha Jones
- Others: Jessica Hynes – Joan Redfern; Rebekah Staton – Jenny; Thomas Brodie-Sangster (Note: Credited as Thomas Sangster) – Tim Latimer; Harry Lloyd – Baines; Tom Palmer – Hutchinson; Gerard Horan – Clark; Lauren Wilson – Lucy Cartwright; Pip Torrens – Rocastle; Matthew White – Phillips; Sophie Turner – Vicar

Production
- Directed by: Charles Palmer
- Written by: Paul Cornell
- Based on: Human Nature by Paul Cornell
- Produced by: Susie Liggat
- Executive producers: Russell T Davies; Julie Gardner; Phil Collinson
- Music by: Murray Gold
- Production code: 3.9
- Series: Series 3
- Running time: 2nd of 2-part story, 45 minutes
- First broadcast: 2 June 2007

Chronology
← Preceded by "Human Nature"	Followed by → "Blink"

"The Family of Blood" is the ninth episode of the third series of the British science fiction television series Doctor Who, which was first broadcast on BBC One on 2 June 2007. It is the second episode of a two-part story written by Paul Cornell adapted from his Doctor Who novel Human Nature (1995), co-plotted with Kate Orman. The first part, "Human Nature", aired one week prior, on 26 May.

In the episode, aliens called the Family of Blood attack a public school and its surrounding village in 1913 to seek a fob watch which contains the essence of the long-lived alien time traveller the Doctor (David Tennant).

In a Doctor Who Magazine interview, Executive Producer Russell T Davies characterised the "Human Nature"/"Family of Blood" two-parter as perhaps being too dark for the programme's audience. In 2008, both "Human Nature" and "The Family of Blood" were nominated for the Hugo Award for Best Dramatic Presentation, Short Form.

== Plot ==
At an English village dance in 1913, the Family of Blood hold Martha and Joan Redfern captive. While John Smith struggles to understand what is happening, Timothy Latimer briefly opens the fob watch containing the Tenth Doctor's Time Lord essence. This momentarily distracts the Family, enabling Martha to grab a gun and escape with the others back to the school. John sounds the alarm and helps to organise the school's defences while Martha and Joan search for the watch.

The Family assault the school with an army of animated scarecrows, but the schoolboys, who have military training, defend themselves against the first wave. When the Family show John that they have discovered his TARDIS, Joan realises that John really is the Doctor, the alien he wrote about in his journal, transformed into human form. John, Joan and Martha escape to an empty house in the village. They are found by Timothy, who returns the watch to them. Discovering that the Doctor has escaped, the Family begin an aerial bombardment of the village from their hidden ship. Martha and Joan implore John to use the watch to become the Doctor and save everyone. John breaks down in tears, reluctant to give up Joan. The two share a vision, enabled by the watch, of what their lives would be like together as humans.

The Doctor makes his way to the Family's ship, tricking the Family into thinking his Time Lord essence is still in the watch. The Doctor surreptitiously initiates an overload of the ship's power source, which causes the ship to explode. The Doctor and the Family escape the explosion, but the Doctor captures them and issues each member an eternal punishment. He wraps the father in unbreakable chains, pushes the mother into the event horizon of a collapsing galaxy, traps their daughter in every mirror in existence, and suspends their son in time before putting him to work as a scarecrow. The Doctor returns to Joan and offers her a chance to travel with him in the TARDIS, but she refuses. She asks the Doctor whether anyone would have died had he not chosen to come to 1913. Timothy bids the Doctor and Martha goodbye and the Doctor gives him the fob watch to keep. Later, during a battle in World War I, Timothy remembers a vision of a bombing and avoids being killed. Later, an elderly Timothy is at a Remembrance Day memorial and sees the Doctor and Martha in the distance, both wearing poppies.

== Production ==
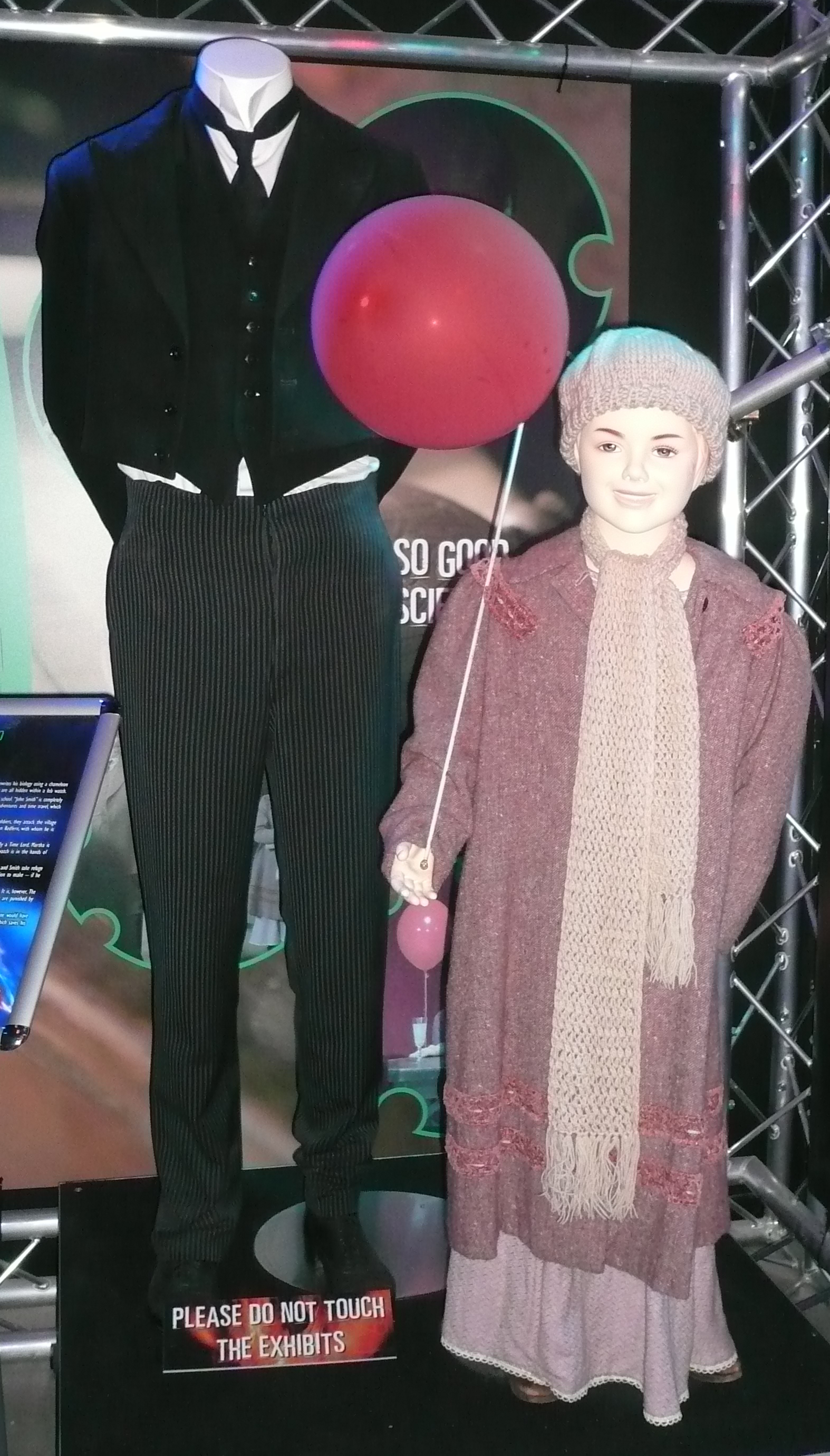
The costumes of Jeremy Baines and Lucy Cartwright, on display at the Doctor Who Experience

John Smith's wedding and the Remembrance Day memorial scene were filmed at Llandaff Cathedral. The building used as the school is a private house, the Grade I-listed Treberfydd in Bwlch a few miles south of Brecon.

Other scenes, including the cricket ball stunt and scenes at Cartwrights' cottage were filmed at St Fagans National History Museum, Cardiff.

The Doctor, in the guise of Mr. Smith, is convinced that his parents were called Sydney and Verity, the writer's reference to the programme's original creators Verity Lambert and Sydney Newman.

== Reception ==
Along with "Human Nature", "The Family of Blood" was nominated for the 2008 Hugo Award for Best Dramatic Presentation, Short Form. David Tennant won the Constellation Award for Best Male Performance in a 2007 Science Fiction Television Episode for his performance in this two-part story.

In 2008, The Daily Telegraph named "Human Nature"/"The Family of Blood" the seventh greatest Doctor Who episode. In 2009, Doctor Who Magazine readers voted it as the sixth best Doctor Who story of all time. Matt Wales of IGN named the two-part story the best episode of Tennant's tenure as the Doctor, describing it as "stunningly produced" and praising Tennant's performance.

== Sequels ==
During the COVID-19 pandemic, several well-regarded episodes of the show were broadcast with live internet commentary from the writers, often paired with new content. Cornell released three interlinked short stories, The Shadow Passes, Shadow of a Doubt, and The Shadow in the Mirror that collectively functioned as a sequel to both the novel and its television adaptation.
