= Charles Palmer (director) =

English television director

- Born: 1965 (age 60–61)
- Occupations: Television director, producer
- Spouse: Claire Skinner (m. 2001; div. 2016)
- Children: 2
- Father: Geoffrey Palmer

Charles Palmer (born 1965) is an English television director and producer. He is best known for his work on Poldark, Doctor Who, and Agatha Christie's Marple. For the Doctor Who episodes "Human Nature" and "The Family of Blood", he was nominated for the Hugo Award for Best Dramatic Presentation, Short Form. Palmer has moved into television producing, with the series Extraordinary nominated for the BAFTA for Best Scripted Comedy.

== Early and personal life ==
Palmer is the son of actor Geoffrey Palmer (1927–2020) and Sally Green. He was married to actress Claire Skinner from 2001 to 2016. The couple had two sons, one born in 1999, the other born in 2002.

== Selected filmography ==
His picture is used in the opening credits of As Time Goes By beside Judi Dench's daughter, Finty Williams. The series starred his father, Geoffrey Palmer.

=== Directing ===
- Linda Green (2001–2002)
- Night and Day
  - 9 episodes (2001–2003)
- Life Begins (2004–2006)
- Agatha Christie's Marple
  - "The Murder at the Vicarage" (2004)
  - "A Pocket Full of Rye" (2009)
  - "A Caribbean Mystery" (2013)
- The Ghost Squad
  - "Greater Good" (2005)
  - "Firewall" (2005)
- Vital Signs
  - Series 1, Episode 1 (2006)
  - Series 1, Episode 3 (2006)
- Doctor Who
  - "Smith and Jones" (2007)
  - "The Shakespeare Code" (2007)
  - "Human Nature" (2007)
  - "The Family of Blood" (2007)
  - "Oxygen" (2017)
  - "The Eaters of Light" (2017)
- Lark Rise to Candleford
  - Series 1, Episode 1 (2008)
  - Series 1, Episode 2 (2008)
  - Series 1, Episode 3 (2008)
  - Series 1, Episode 5 (2008)
- Agatha Christie's Poirot
  - "The Clocks" (2009)
  - "Hallowe'en Party" (2010)
- Lewis
  - "The Mind Has Mountains" (2011)
- Death in Paradise
  - "Arriving in Paradise" (2011)
  - "Predicting Murder" (2011)
- By Any Means (2013)
- Midsomer Murders
  - "Murder by Magic" (2015)
- Doc Martin
  - "Education, Education, Education" (2015)
  - "Control-Alt-Delete" (2015)
  - "Paint It Black" (2019)
  - "Wild West Country" (2019)
  - "Equilibrium" (2019)
- Poldark
  - Series 2, Episode 5 (2016)
  - Series 2, Episode 6 (2016)
  - Series 2, Episode 7 (2016)
  - Series 2, Episode 8 (2016)
- Silent Witness
  - "Moment of Surrender: Part 1" (2018)
  - "Moment of Surrender: Part 2" (2018)
- The Mallorca Files
  - "King of the Mountains" (2011)
  - "Number One Fan" (2011)

=== Producing ===
- Agatha Raisin (2021–2022)
- Extraordinary (2023–2024)
- A Woman of Substance (2026)
- Hercule
