= Brick Lane (2006 film) =

2006 British TV documentary

- Genre: Documentary
- Directed by: Minoo Bhatia
- Country of origin: United Kingdom
- Original language: English

Production
- Producer: Minoo Bhatia
- Production locations: London, United Kingdom
- Running time: 50 minutes

Original release
- Network: BBC Two
- Release: 25 March 2006

Related
- Banglatown Banquet

Brick Lane is a 2006 British documentary directed and produced by Minoo Bhatia. The documentary is about the personal stories and journeys of people who have made the street Brick Lane their home, how these different groups have shaped the town and the changing cultural markers that define the area. It was broadcast by BBC Two on 25 March 2006.

== Overview ==
Brick Lane has changed with successive waves of immigration as newer communities reclaim the area as their own and older ones move out. The documentary explores the history of many first-generation immigrants over the centuries, it works its way back and forth in time through three groups of immigrants, from French Huguenots to Jewish immigrants and more recently Bangladeshi residents. For the Huguenots' story there were engravings and re-enactments by actors, and the Jewish and Bangladeshi experiences were explained by interviews.

First were 15,000 Huguenots Protestants who fled Catholic France in the 16th and 17th centuries to settle in Spitalfields. They brought with them skill as weavers – which they could practise in the East End outside the fortress of closed shops run by City of London guilds.

Next were the Jewish settlers who came from eastern Europe in the late 19th century and settled into the rag trade. The playwright Bernard Kops' late parents, Joel and Jenny, came to Brick Lane at the turn of the 20th century from Amsterdam. They were two of tens of thousands of Jewish immigrants who sought financial survival.

In the 1950s, came the Bangladeshis, majority of them from the poor farming region of Sylhet. Shafiq arrived from Bangladesh in 1958, by the mid-1960s he was the first Asian manager of the Wimpy Bar chain and married a white woman Pamela. His contemporary Abdul Gaffer brought over his Bangladeshi wife, and despite not knowing English, he settled down to work and 50 years later is still there.

In addition, a Huguenot church turned into a Methodist chapel, then into a synagogue, and in 1976 became the Great London Mosque (Brick Lane Mosque). The Huguenots faced riots from jealous native textile workers. Kops witnessed the Battle of Cable Street, in which Oswald Mosley's fascists were finally taken on by his people. The Bangladeshis in the 1970s endured the attentions of the BNP and National Front, and responded with a sit-in that saw them off.

The work explores themes of immigration, social tolerance, and economic hardship in the Brick Lane area.

== Broadcast ==
Brick Lane was originally screened at Rich Mix as part of the East End Film Festival on 1 May 2006. It was later broadcast by BBC Two as part of A Night on Brick Lane and was followed by the drama film Banglatown Banquet on 25 March 2006 (the day before Bangladesh Independence Day).

== See also ==
- Brick Lane
- Brick Lane Mosque
- British Bangladeshi
- British Jews
- French migration to the United Kingdom
- History of the Jews in the United Kingdom
- History of Bangladeshis in the United Kingdom
- Historical immigration to Great Britain
