= Human Nature (Doctor Who) =

185a – "Human Nature"
- Doctor Who episode

Cast
- Doctor: David Tennant – Tenth Doctor (Note: Credited as "The Doctor/Smith".)
- Companion: Freema Agyeman – Martha Jones
- Others: Jessica Hynes – Joan Redfern; Rebekah Staton – Jenny; Thomas Brodie-Sangster (Note: Credited as Thomas Sangster) – Tim Latimer; Harry Lloyd – Baines; Tom Palmer – Hutchinson; Gerard Horan – Clark; Lauren Wilson – Lucy Cartwright; Pip Torrens – Rocastle; Matthew White – Phillips; Derek Smith – Doorman; Peter Bourke – Mr Chambers

Production
- Directed by: Charles Palmer
- Written by: Paul Cornell
- Based on: Human Nature by Paul Cornell
- Produced by: Susie Liggat
- Executive producers: Russell T Davies; Julie Gardner; Phil Collinson
- Music by: Murray Gold
- Production code: 3.8
- Series: Series 3
- Running time: 1st of 2-part story, 45 minutes
- First broadcast: 26 May 2007

Chronology
← Preceded by "42"	Followed by → "The Family of Blood"

"Human Nature" is the eighth episode of the third series of the revived British science fiction television series Doctor Who, which was originally broadcast on BBC One on 26 May 2007. It is the first episode of a two-part story written by Paul Cornell adapted from his 1995 Doctor Who novel Human Nature. Its second part, "The Family of Blood", aired on 2 June. Along with "The Family of Blood", it was nominated for the Hugo Award for Best Dramatic Presentation, Short Form in 2008.

In the episode, the alien time traveller the Tenth Doctor (David Tennant) hides from his pursuers, the Family of Blood, in a public school in 1913. He transforms himself into a human and implants the false persona of a schoolteacher called "John Smith" to avoid detection until the Family's life runs out.

== Plot ==
=== Synopsis ===
The Tenth Doctor is pursued by the Family of Blood, (Note: The Family are not named on screen until the second part of the story, also called "The Family of Blood".) who seek his Time Lord life force to prevent themselves from dying. The Doctor tells Martha that he must transform into a human to escape the Family's detection until they die out, and gives her a list of instructions to follow. The Doctor turns himself into a human using a device called the Chameleon Arch, transferring his Time Lord essence and memories into a fob watch that he asks Martha to guard.

Landing in England (Note: In the second part, "The Family of Blood", the Family's Son, in the guise of Baines, says that "War comes to England, a year in advance.") in 1913, The Doctor takes the persona of John Smith, a teacher at Farringham School for Boys, while Martha goes undercover as a maid at the school. John is quiet and timid, but faint memories of the Doctor slip through in his dreams. He catalogues the dreams in a book he has titled A Journal of Impossible Things. John keeps the fob watch on his mantle, believing it is a normal watch. John has also become infatuated with the school nurse, young widow Joan Redfern, and shares his journal with her. Martha is concerned, as the Doctor did not instruct her on what to do should he fall in love. Timothy Latimer, a young student at the school with extrasensory perception, discovers the fob watch and bonds with it, seeing visions of the Doctor.

The Family of Blood track the Doctor to England, and cloak their ship with an invisibility shield to keep it hidden. The Family seek out humans to possess, and take the bodies of several people including one of the schoolboys, Jeremy Baines. They also animate scarecrows to use as their soldiers. When Timothy briefly opens the fob watch and experiences portions of the Doctor's memories, the Family detects its presence at the school. Martha realises that the Family has found them, and attempts to find the watch. John asks Joan to accompany him to the village dance that night, and she accepts. Timothy follows them to the dance and bumps into Martha, recognising her from the Doctor's memories. At the dance, Martha again tries to persuade John to become the Doctor by showing him elements of his past such as his sonic screwdriver. Now aware that John Smith is the Doctor, the Family interrupt the dance and confront him. They take Martha and Joan as hostages and give John a choice to either become a Time Lord again or watch Martha and Joan die.

=== Continuity ===
All ten incarnations of the Doctor are also illustrated, with the First, Fifth, Sixth, Seventh, and Eighth clearly visible, marking the first time the faces of the Doctors from the classic series had been depicted on screen in the revived series.

== Production ==
Human Nature was Paul Cornell's fifth original novel, all having been Doctor Who stories for Virgin Publishing, and the thirty-eighth New Adventure. The plot was developed with fellow New Adventure novelist Kate Orman and the book was well received on its publication in 1995. Several years later, the revived Doctor Who television series included several people who had worked on the New Adventures. For his second story for the television series, Cornell adapted his novel. Although most praise for the script was directed at Cornell, a great deal of the episode had in fact been rewritten by executive producer Russell T Davies.

Despite Julie Gardner's position as executive producer since "Rose", this episode marks the first time since Verity Lambert's 1965 swansong, "Mission to the Unknown", that a woman was the credited producer of an episode of Doctor Who. However, it is not producer Susie Liggat's first production job in the Doctor Who universe: in 2006, she produced Invasion of the Bane, the first episode of The Sarah Jane Adventures. Thus, only she and John Nathan-Turner have produced episodes from two different programmes set in the Doctor Who universe.

The physical prop of John Smith's journal notebook was created by artist Kellyanne Walker, and incorporates text provided by writer Paul Cornell. Much of the episode was filmed at St Fagans National History Museum, an open-air museum near Cardiff, and Treberfydd, the Victorian Gothic mansion which served as Farringham School, located near Llangorse Lake in south Wales. Other interior locations were filmed at Llandaff Cathedral, Cardiff.

The Doctor's list of 23 directives, much of which is sped through in the episode, is presented at normal speed in a deleted scene released on the BBC DVD. In place of the nonexistent unheard requests, David Tennant breaks the fourth wall to speak about a love for The Housemartins and also talk nonsense to pad out the time before returning to character for the 23rd and final directive. Another instruction, about not letting Smith eat pears, appears in both the deleted scene and in the novel Human Nature.

== Reception ==
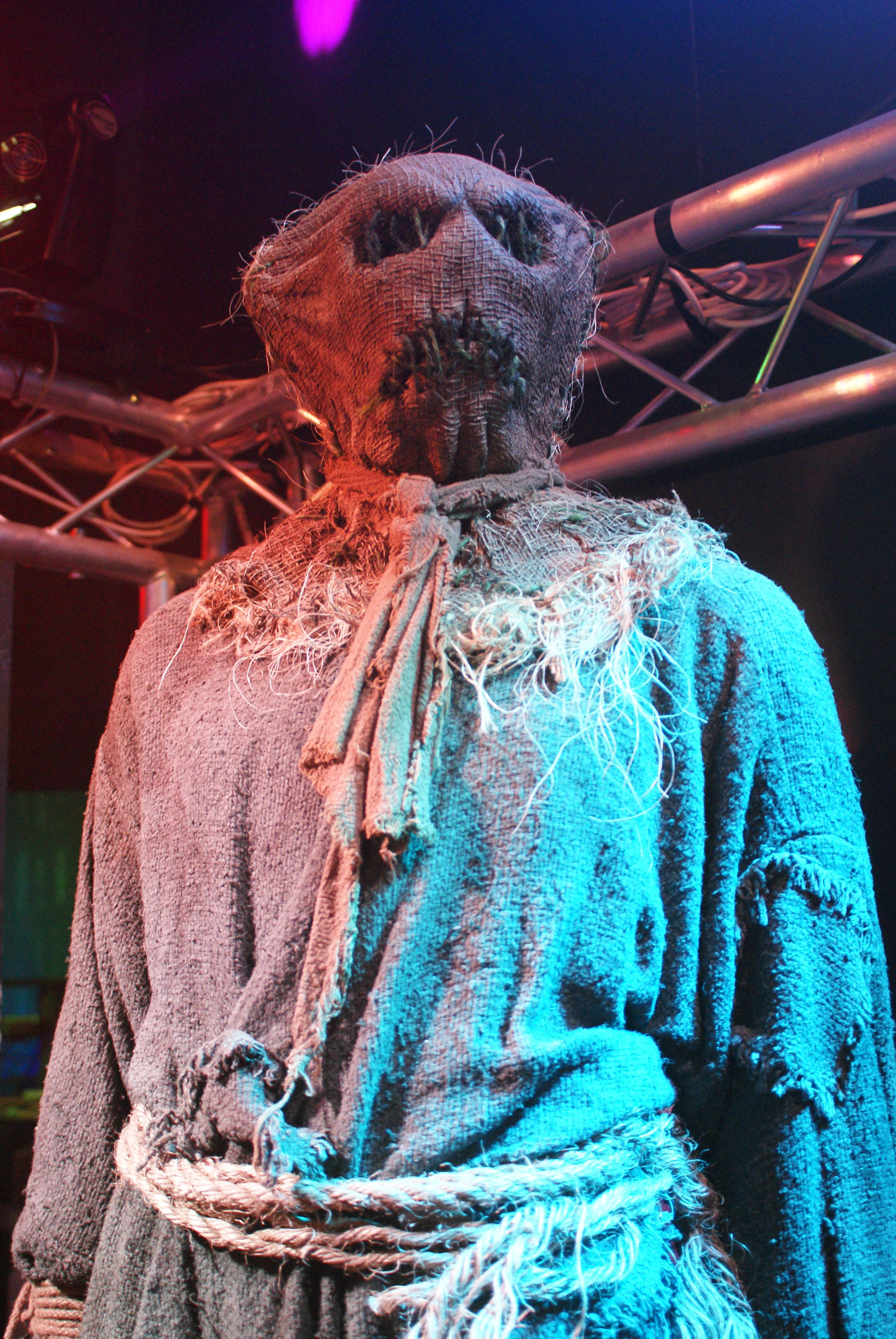
The scarecrows from the episode as they appear at the Doctor Who Experience.

Along with "The Family of Blood", "Human Nature" was nominated for the 2008 Hugo Award for Best Dramatic Presentation, Short Form. David Tennant won the Constellation Award for Best Male Performance in a 2007 Science Fiction Television Episode for the two-part story. The episode also received a favourable review from The Stage with reviewer Mark Wright commenting that the episode "is unlike any Doctor Who story you'll ever see", and that there was "nothing duff" about the episode. Wright singles out the performances of Agyeman and Tennant for considerable praise and he concludes by describing the episode as "BAFTA worthy Drama". IGN's Travis Fickett gave "Human Nature" a rating of 9.1 out of 10, writing that it "has some of the highest caliber of writing the series has seen". He particularly praised the performances of Hynes and Brodie-Sangster and the episode's "more deliberate pace". While he noted that the Family was creepy (with Baines in particular), he felt that the scarecrows "might seem a little silly" to older viewers.

In 2009, Doctor Who Magazine readers voted "Human Nature"/"The Family of Blood" as the sixth best Doctor Who story of all time. In a 2014 poll, Doctor Who Magazine readers voted the episodes as the ninth best. Matt Wales of IGN named the two-part story the best episode of Tennant's tenure as the Doctor, describing it as "stunningly produced" and praising Tennant's performance. In 2008, The Daily Telegraph named it the seventh best Doctor Who episode in the show's history.
