= Paul Cornell =

British writer

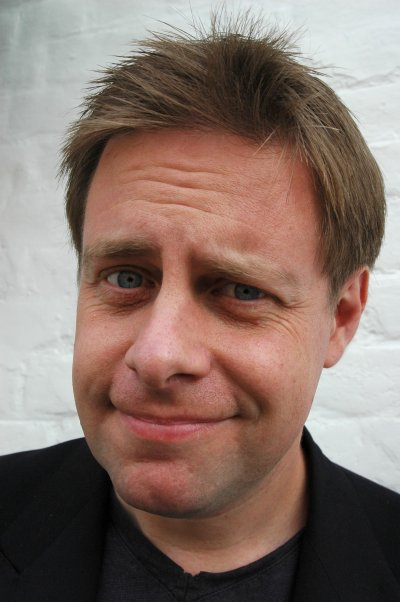
- Cornell in 2007
- Born: Paul Douglas Cornell; 18 July 1967 (age 59); Chippenham, Wiltshire, England, United Kingdom
- Occupations: Writer, novelist
- Writing career
- Period: 1990–present
- Genre: Science fiction
- Website: www.paulcornell.com

Paul Douglas Cornell (born 18 July 1967) is a British writer. He has worked in television drama and Doctor Who fiction, being the creator of one of the Doctor's spin-off companions, Bernice Summerfield.

Other British television dramas for which he has written include Robin Hood, Primeval, Casualty, Holby City and Coronation Street. For American television, he has contributed an episode to the modern-day set Sherlock Holmes series Elementary.

Cornell has also written for a number of British comics, as well as Marvel Comics and DC Comics in the United States, and has had six original novels published.

He is one of only two people to be nominated for Hugo Awards in prose, comics and TV.

== Career ==
Cornell's professional writing career began in 1990 when he was a winner in a young writers' competition and his entry, Kingdom Come, was produced and screened on BBC Two. Soon after, he wrote Timewyrm: Revelation, a novel for the Virgin New Adventures series of Doctor Who novels. Timewyrm: Revelation was a reworking of a serialised fan fiction piece Cornell had penned previously for the fanzine Queen Bat. Several other Doctor Who novels followed, including Human Nature.

Cornell then began working for Granada Television, where he wrote for the children's medical drama Children's Ward and created his own children's series Wavelength for Yorkshire Television, which ran for two series. He made the crossover to working in adult television full-time in 1996, when he was one of the main contributors to Granada's supernatural soap opera Springhill, which ran for two years on Sky One and later on Channel 4.

After a short stint on Coronation Street, he began working for other production companies, including contributing an episode in 1999 to Red Production Company's anthology drama series Love in the 21st Century for Channel 4. His episode, entitled Masturbation, starred Ioan Gruffudd as Jack. He was due to be one of the writers on Red Production Company's planned Queer as Folk spin-off series Misfits, but the series was never made, being cancelled by Channel 4.

In the 21st century he has written mainly for the BBC, contributing episodes to all three of their regular medical dramas: Casualty, Holby City and the daytime soap opera Doctors. He also contributed to the 1950s-set Sunday evening prime time drama series Born and Bred and was one of the writers of the 2005 series revival of Doctor Who, writing the episode "Father's Day". The episode was nominated for the Hugo Award for Best Dramatic Presentation, Short Form in 2006 and came third in terms of votes for its category. Cornell later wrote a two-part story for Doctor Who's 2007 series, based on his 1995 Virgin New Adventures novel Human Nature. The title of the first episode was also "Human Nature", while the second was titled "The Family of Blood". In 2008, the two episodes were nominated for the Hugo Award for Best Dramatic Presentation, Short Form.

In February 2006, Cornell announced in a post on his weblog that he would be writing an episode for the BBC's Robin Hood, produced by Tiger Aspect Productions for the same Saturday evening family slot as Doctor Who. He later announced that he was also writing a second Robin Hood episode for later in the first series. His first episode, "Who Shot the Sheriff?", aired on BBC One on 21 October 2006. His second, "A Thing or Two About Loyalty", followed on 2 December 2006. He also wrote an episode for the second season of another Saturday evening family adventure programme, the ITV science-fiction series Primeval, transmitted in February 2008.

He also wrote the one-off pilot Pulse, which was shown on BBC Three in early June 2010.

Outside of television, he has been active in various other media, having written six Doctor Who novels for Virgin Publishing and BBC Books during the 1990s, three Doctor Who audio dramas for Big Finish Productions and a fully animated internet-broadcast Doctor Who adventure, Scream of the Shalka (starring Richard E. Grant as the Doctor) for bbc.co.uk in 2003. He has also written two mainstream science-fiction novels, Something More and British Summertime for Gollancz, and various novels, short stories and audio dramas based around a character he created for the New Adventures, Professor Bernice Summerfield, and whom he later licensed to Big Finish Productions.

He has also co-authored (often working with Keith Topping and Martin Day) several non-fiction books on television, including The Guinness Book of Classic British TV, X-treme Possibilities (a guide to The X-Files), and The Discontinuity Guide (a humorous guide to Doctor Who). (Topping and Day's Doctor Who novel The Devil Goblins from Neptune was also based on an original idea with Cornell.) He has also written comics, both for Doctor Who Magazine and the 2000 AD spin-off Judge Dredd Megazine.

He has written Wisdom, a 6-issue limited series for Marvel Comics' MAX imprint, featuring the character Peter Wisdom, with art by Trevor Hairsine and Manuel Garcia.

It was announced at the 2007 Wizard World Chicago comic book convention that Cornell would be following Chris Claremont on Marvel's New Excalibur. Plans were subsequently changed with the cancellation of the New Excalibur title and Cornell's new project was announced as being titled Captain Britain and MI: 13. The third trade paperback, Vampire State, was nominated for the 2010 "Best Graphic Story" Hugo Award.

Cornell has also written Young Avengers Presents No. 4 (April 2008) and a Fantastic Four mini-series comic, True Story, which started in July 2008, which featured the team encountering characters from the pages of literary classics. In 2008, he wrote a comic which featured on the Doctor Who website. He has also written the Young Avengers limited series that ties into Dark Reign and Black Widow: Deadly Origin a mini-series that ties into the character's appearance in Iron Man 2.

Cornell became the next Action Comics writer after War of the Supermen. Cornell signed with DC Comics exclusively in 2010 as part of writing for Action Comics. His 16-issue run on the series included number 900. In late 2010 and early 2011, Cornell completed nine issues set in Batman's world: Knight & Squire, a six-issue miniseries, and a three-issue run in Batman & Robin, #17–19.

In September 2011, as part of DC's The New 52 relaunch, Cornell became the writer for the DC Comics titles Demon Knights and Stormwatch. Cornell's last DC work was the 14-issue science fiction series Saucer Country, which ended with the June 2013 issue.

Cornell is part of the regular panel of the podcast SF Squeecast, which won the 2012 and 2013 Hugo Award for best fancast.

In January 2016, Cornell announced his return to television drama work with his first script for US television, contributing an episode to the CBS Sherlock Holmes series Elementary.

In 2018, he started co-hosting (with Lizbeth Myles from the Verity! podcast) a podcast reviewing horror films made by Hammer Film Productions entitled Hammer House of Podcast.

== Personal life ==
Cornell was diagnosed with autism as a child, but was not told about the diagnosis until later in life.

In an interview on the Doctor Who: DWO Whocast, Cornell stated that this entry in Wikipedia described him as "both a Christian and a pagan", which he has chosen not to correct as it illustrates his sympathies for the pagan world. He then goes on to state that he is an Anglican but is very "Low Church, almost a Calvinist" and this is partly because he does not enjoy hymns.

Spiritual themes are common in his work (for example, his novel Something More). Other frequent references in his work include owls.

Cornell is married to Caroline Symcox, currently the Vicar of St Mary's Church, Fairford, who also has written Doctor Who-based audio plays for Big Finish Productions on her own and with Cornell. They have a son, born in 2012.

== Bibliography ==
He has written novels, non-fiction, audio plays and comic scripts.

=== Novels ===
==== Doctor Who and related ====
===== Virgin New Adventures =====
- Timewyrm: Revelation (ISBN 0-426-20360-7)
- Love and War (ISBN 0-426-20385-2)
- No Future (ISBN 0-426-20409-3)
- Human Nature (ISBN 0-426-20443-3)
- Happy Endings (ISBN 0-426-20470-0)

==== Virgin Missing Adventures ====
- Goth Opera (ISBN 0-426-20418-2)

==== Eighth Doctor Adventures ====
- The Shadows of Avalon (ISBN 0-563-55588-2)

==== Other related works ====
- Doctor Who - Scream of the Shalka]]b(ISBN 0-563-48619-8) (novelization of webcast story).
- Doctor Who - Twice Upon a Time (ISBN 978-1-78594-330-0) (novelization of the television story.
- Oh No It Isn't! (ISBN 0-426-20507-3) (featuring Bernice Summerfield, a character created by him)
- The Dead Men Diaries (editor of anthology, featuring Bernice Summerfield)
- A Life of Surprises (editor of anthology, featuring Bernice Summerfield)
- Life During Wartime (editor of anthology, featuring Bernice Summerfield)

==== Shadow Polices ====
The following three novels in the series have been published by Tor Books, with two further novels remaining unpublished.

- London Falling (ISBN 0-2307-6321-9)
- The Severed Streets (ISBN 0-7653-3028-8)
- Who Killed Sherlock Holmes? (ISBN 1-4472-7326-5)

==== Other novels ====
- Something More (ISBN 0-575-07203-2)
- British Summertime (ISBN 0-575-07404-3)
- The Uninvited (ISBN 0-7535-0220-8) (novelisation for Virgin of 1997 ITV science-fiction drama serial)
- Chalk (ISBN 0-765-39095-7) Published March 2017

=== Short fiction ===
- "The Ghosts of Christmas" on Tor.com, 19 December 2012
- "The Elephant in the Room" on Tor.com, 29 May 2013 – a Wild Cards story
- Rosebud (novella), Tordotcom, 26 April 2022

==== Jonathan Hamilton stories ====
About an out-of-uniform soldier in a parallel world where the ‘great game’ of European espionage continues into space.

- Catherine Drewe (2008) Available to read for free at the Pyr Books Sample Chapters blog
- One Of Our Bastards Is Missing (2009) Available as a pdf download from Solaris Books
- The Copenhagen Interpretation (2011) Available as a pdf download from www.asimovs.com (Hugo 2012 Nominee Novelette)
- A Better Way to Die (Novella, 2014) Included in Rogues

==== Witches of Lychford novella series ====
- Witches of Lychford (ISBN 9780765385239)
- The Lost Child of Lychford (ISBN 9780765389770)
- A Long Day in Lychford (ISBN 9780765393180)
- The Lights Go Out in Lychford (ISBN 9781250249470)
- Last Stand in Lychford (ISBN 9781250752123)

=== Non-fiction ===
- Avengers Dossier: The Definitive Unauthorised Guide (ISBN 0-86369-754-2) with Martin Day and Keith Topping
- Licence Denied: Rumblings from the Doctor Who Underground (ISBN 0-7535-0104-X) (editor)
- X-treme Possibilities: A Paranoid Rummage Through The X-files (ISBN 0-7535-0228-3) with Day and Topping
- The Discontinuity Guide (ISBN 0-426-20442-5) with Day and Topping
- The Guinness Book of Classic British TV with Day and Topping
- The New Trek Programme Guide (ISBN 0-86369-922-7) with Day and Topping

=== Audio plays ===
- The State of The Art, (2009), adapted from the Iain M. Banks novella, originally Broadcast on BBC Radio 4
- Something in the Water (2011), originally Broadcast on BBC Radio 4
- Tom Clancy’s Splinter Cell: Firewall (2022), originally broadcast on BBC Radio 4, with Sebastian Baczkiewicz and adapted from James Swallow's novel of the same name, itself based on the video game. Winner of the 2023 Scribe Award for Best Audio Drama.

==== Doctor Who ====
- The Shadow of the Scourge (2000)
- Seasons of Fear with Caroline Symcox (2002)
- Circular Time with Mike Maddox (2007)
- 100 with Jacqueline Rayner, Rob Shearman and Joseph Lidster (2007)
- Love and War (audio adaptation by Jacqueline Rayner of novel) (2012)
- Shadow of a Doubt (audio drama for #DoctorWhoLockdown featuring Lisa Bowerman as Bernice Summerfield) (2020)
- The Shadow In The Mirror (audio drama for #DoctorWhoLockdown) (2020)

==== Professor Bernice Summerfield ====
- Oh No It Isn't! (audio adaptation by Jacqueline Rayner of novel) (1998)
- Buried Treasures with Jacqueline Rayner (1999)
- Death and the Daleks (2004)
- Many Happy Returns with Xanna Eve Chown, Stephen Cole, Stephen Fewell, Simon Guerrier, Scott Handcock, Rebecca Levene, Jacqueline Rayner, Justin Richards, Miles Richardson, Eddie Robson and Dave Stone (2012)

=== Comics ===
- Doctor Who:
  - "Stairway to Heaven" (with co-author John Freeman and pencils by Gerry Dolan and inks by Rex Ward, in Doctor Who Magazine No. 156, 1990)
  - "Teenage Kicks" (illustrated text story, in Doctor Who Magazine No. 163, 1990)
  - "The Chameleon Factor" (with pencils by Lee Sullivan and inks by Mark Farmer, in Doctor Who Magazine No. 174, 1991)
  - "Emperor of the Daleks" (with co-author John Freeman and art by Lee Sullivan, in Doctor Who Magazine #197–202, 1993)
  - "Time and Time Again" (with art by John Ridgway, in Doctor Who Magazine No. 207, 1993
  - "Metamorphosis" (with art by Lee Sullivan, in Doctor Who Yearbook 1993)
  - "Blood Invocation" (with art by John Ridgway, in Doctor Who Yearbook 1995)
- Pan-African Judges (with Siku, in Judge Dredd Megazine vol. 2 #44–49, 1993–1994)
- Deathwatch: "Faust & Falsehood" (with Adrian Salmon, in Judge Dredd Megazine vol. 3 #8–13, 1995–1996)
- XTNCT (with D'Israeli, in Judge Dredd Megazine #209–214, 2003–2004, trade paperback, XTNCT: CM ND HV G F Y THNK YR HRD NGH!, 48 pages, hardcover, December 2006, ISBN 1-904265-69-3)
- Wisdom (with Trevor Hairsine and Manuel Garcia, 6-issue limited series, Marvel Comics, January–July 2007, tpb, 144 pages, August 2007, ISBN 0-7851-2123-4)
- Young Avengers Presents No. 4 (with Mark Brooks, Marvel Comics, April 2008, collected in Young Avengers Presents, 144 pages, October 2008, ISBN 0-7851-2975-8)
- Captain Britain and MI: 13 #1–15 plus annual (with Leonard Kirk, Marvel Comics, May 2008 – July 2009):
  - Secret Invasion (collects Captain Britain and MI: 13 #1–4, 104 pages, Panini Comics, January 2009, ISBN 1-84653-407-0, Marvel Comics, March 2009, ISBN 0-7851-3344-5)
  - Hell Comes To Birmingham (collects Captain Britain and MI: 13 #5–9, 120 pages, Panini Comics, June 2009, ISBN 1-84653-423-2, Marvel Comics, July 2009, ISBN 0-7851-3345-3)
  - Vampire State (collects Captain Britain and MI: 13 #10–15 + annual #1, 184 pages, Marvel Comics, October 2009, ISBN 0-7851-3952-4)
- Fantastic Four: True Story (with Horacio Dominguez, 4-issue mini-series, Marvel Comics, July–October 2008)
- Dark Reign: Young Avengers (with Mark Brooks, 5-issue limited series, Marvel Comics, May–September 2009)
- Dark X-Men: The Beginning (with Leonard Kirk, 3-issue mini-series, Marvel Comics, September–October 2009, hardcover, December 2009, ISBN 0-7851-4230-4)
- Black Widow: Deadly Origin (with Tom Raney and John Paul Leon, 4-issue mini-series, Marvel Comics, January–April 2010)
- Dark X-Men (with Leonard Kirk, 5-issue limited series, Marvel Comics, January–May 2010, premiere hardcover, June 2010, ISBN 0-7851-4526-5)
- Action Comics #890–904 and Annual 13 (with artist Pete Woods, DC Comics, August 2010 – October 2011)
- Soldier Zero #1–7 (with Javier Pina, POW! Entertainment/Boom! Studios, October 2010 – April 2011)
- Knight and Squire (with artist Jimmy Broxton, 6-issue limited series, DC Comics, December 2010 – May 2011)
- Batman & Robin #17–19 (with Scott McDaniel, DC Comics, November 2010 – January 2011)
- (12 July 2011), Stormwatch #1–6 (with Miguel Sepulveda, DC Comics, November 2011 – February 2012)
- Demon Knights #1–15 (with Diogenes Neves, DC Comics, November 2011 – November 2012)
- Saucer Country #1–14 (with Ryan Kelly, Vertigo, May 2012 – April 2013)
- Wolverine vol. 5 1-13 (March, 2013-January, 2014):
  - Volume 1: Hunting Season (hc, 136 pages, 2013, ISBN 0-78518-396-5) collects:
    - "Hunting Season" (with Alan Davis, in #1-4, 2013)
    - "Drowning Logan" (with Mirco Pierfederici, in #5-6, 2013)
  - Volume 2: Killable (hc, 160 pages, 2014, ISBN 0-78518-397-3) collects:
    - "Mortal" (with Mirco Pierfederici, in #7, 2013)
    - "Killable" (with Alan Davis, in #8-13, 2013–2014)
- Wolverine vol. 6 1-12 (February, 2014-October, 2014):
  - Three Months to Die Book 1 (hc, 160 pages, 2014, ISBN 0-78515-419-1) collects:
    - "Rogue Logan" (with Ryan Stegman and David Baldeon, in #1-4, 2014)
    - "His Own Skin" (with Gerardo Sandoval, in #5, 2014)
    - "The Madripoor Job" (with Gerardo Sandoval, in #6-7, 2014)
- This Damned Band (with artist Tony Parker, 6-issue limited series, Dark Horse Comics, August 2015 – January 2016)
- Anderson, Psi Division: "Half of a Heaven" (with Emma Vieceli and Barbara Nosenzo, in 2000 AD Sci-Fi Special 2022)

=== Screenplays ===
==== Debut on Two ====
- "Kingdom Come" (episode of anthology series, 1990)

==== Casualty ====
- "Crash Course" (2001)
- "You're Going Home in the Back of an Ambulance" (2002)
- "Past, Present, Future" (2002)
- "Code Red" (2002)
- "An Accident Waiting To Happen" (2003)

==== Holby City ====
- "Under Pressure" (2004)

==== Doctor Who ====
- "Father's Day" (2005)
- "Human Nature" / "The Family of Blood" (2007)

===== Related =====
- "Scream of the Shalka" (2003, animated web series/pilot)

==== Robin Hood ====
- "Who Shot the Sheriff?" (2006)
- "A Thing or Two About Loyalty" (2006)

==== Primeval ====
- "Traitor Revealed" (2008)

==== Elementary ====
- "You've Got Me, Who's Got You?" (2016)

==== Other work ====
- Pulse (pilot for unproduced series, 2010)

Preceded by Grant Morrison	Batman and Robin writer 2010–2011	Succeeded by Peter Tomasi
Preceded by Cullen Bunn	Wolverine writer 2013–2014	Succeeded by Benjamin Percy
