= Something More (novel) =

2001 novel by Paul Cornell

- Cover of Gollancz edition
- Author: Paul Cornell
- Language: English
- Genre: Science fiction novel
- Publisher: Gollancz
- Publication date: 2001
- Publication place: United Kingdom
- Media type: Print (Hardcover & Paperback)
- Pages: 432 pp
- ISBN: 0-575-07203-2
- OCLC: 46332429

Something More is a science fantasy novel by Paul Cornell, first published by Gollancz in 2001. It was Cornell's first (non-tie-in) novel to be published.

The novel is set in a future Britain circa 2248, and the plot centres on the investigation of a mysterious stately home called Heartsease.
