= Hettie Macdonald =

British film, theatre and television director

- Born: England, United Kingdom
- Education: Bristol University
- Occupations: Film director, theatre director, television director

Hettie Macdonald is an English film, theatre and television director. Macdonald is known as the director of the Hugo Award-winning 2007 episode of Doctor Who, "Blink". She has won numerous awards including one BAFTA Television Award for Best Single Drama, one Hugo Award, and a Grand Prix award. She has been nominated for numerous awards, including two BAFTA Television Awards.

"Blink" is frequently named as the best episode of Doctor Who since the series' 2005 revival. In 2009, SFX named the episode's climax as the scariest moment in Doctor Who's history, citing its "perfect direction". Macdonald would return to the series in 2015 to direct the year's opening story.

She has also directed for the stage. She studied English at Bristol University, before training as a director at the Royal Court Theatre, and was formerly associate director at the Wolsey Theatre, Ipswich.

== Career ==
Macdonald made her feature-length film directorial debut on 1996's Beautiful Thing, which received mostly positive reviews and is considered by many to be an LGBTQ+ classic. She did not direct another film for cinemas until 2023's The Unlikely Pilgrimage of Harold Fry, which has also received positive reviews.

== Selected credits ==
=== Film ===
Year	Title	Notes
1996	Beautiful Thing	
2023	The Unlikely Pilgrimage of Harold Fry	

=== Television ===
Year	Title	Notes
1997	Casualty	2 episodes
2001	In a Land of Plenty	Miniseries
2003	Servants	3 episodes
2005–13	Poirot	Episodes: "The Mystery of the Blue Train", "Curtain"
2006	Banglatown Banquet	TV movie
2007–15	Doctor Who	Episodes: "Blink", "The Magician's Apprentice", "The Witch's Familiar"
2008	White Girl	TV movie
2008	The Fixer	2 episodes
2010	Wallander	Episode: "Faceless Killers"
2010	Law & Order: UK	Episode: "Masquerade"
2012	Hit & Miss	3 episodes
2013	The Tunnel	2 episodes
2015–17	Fortitude	6 episodes
2017	Howards End	4 episodes
2020	Normal People	6 episodes
2026	Steal	3 episodes

=== Theatre ===
Year	Title	Venue	Notes
1997	The Northern Fox	Ambassadors Theatre	
1998	Hey Persephone!	Aldeburgh Festival / Almeida Theatre	
1998	The Storm	Almeida Theatre	
2002	She Stoops to Conquer	Theatre Royal, Margate	
2002	Top Girls	Citizens Theatre	
2004	M.A.D.	Bush Theatre	
2006	On Insomnia and Midnight	Royal Court	
2025	Hedda	Orange Tree Theatre	

== Awards and nominations ==
Year	Award	Category	Work	Result	Notes
2008	Hugo Award	Best Dramatic Presentation, Short Form	"Blink", Doctor Who	Won	
2009	BAFTA Television Awards	Best Single Drama	White Girl	Won	
2013	BAFTA Television Craft Awards	Best Director: Fiction	Hit & Miss	Nominated	
2018	BAFTA Television Awards	Best Mini-Series	Howards End	Nominated	

== See also ==
- List of female film and television directors
- List of LGBT-related films directed by women
