= Gerard Horan =

British actor (born 1962)

- Born: Gerard James Pertwee Horan; 11 November 1962 (age 63); Stockport, England
- Occupation: Actor
- Years active: 1984–present

Gerard James Pertwee Horan (born 11 November 1962) is a British actor. He is known for playing Terry Seymour, the leader of the DMDC (Danebury Metal Detectoring Club), in the BAFTA award-winning comedy drama Detectorists and for playing Firefighter Leslie "Charisma" Appleby in London's Burning from 1986 to 1989 and again in 1994.

== Partial filmography ==
- My Beautiful Laundrette (1985) as Telephone Man
- The Singing Detective (1986, TV Mini-Series) as Reginald Dibbs
- London's Burning: The Movie (1986, TV Pilot Film) as Leslie 'Charisma' Appleby
- Hidden City (1987) as Young Man in Tunnel
- Sammy and Rosie Get Laid (1987) as Restaurant Manager
- London's Burning (1988-1989, 1994, TV Series) as Leslie 'Charisma' Appleby
- Tank Malling (1989) as Car Park Attendant
- Chicago Joe and the Showgirl (1990) as John Wilkins
- Lovejoy (1992, TV Series) as Toni
- The Ruth Rendell Mysteries (1991, TV Series) as John Hood
- Much Ado About Nothing (1993) as Borachio
- A Touch of Frost (1994, TV Series) as Ray Butler
- Mary Shelley's Frankenstein (1994) as Claude
- Immortal Beloved (1994) as Nikolaus Johann van Beethoven
- In the Bleak Midwinter (1995) as Carnforth Greville (Rosencrantz, Guildenstern, Horatio, and Barnardo)
- Different for Girls (1995) as Sergeant Harry
- Les Misérables (1998) as Digne Gendarme
- Wycliffe (1998, TV Series) as DS Chaplin
- Harbour Lights as Tony Simpson
- Hot Money (2001, TV Movie) as Don Watmore
- The Last Great Wilderness (2002) as Contract killer
- Nicholas Nickleby (2002) as Ned Cheeryble
- Dr Jekyll and Mr Hyde (2002) as Utterson
- Bright Young Things (2003) as Race Official
- My Family (2004, TV Series) as Mr. Addiss
- Agatha Christie's Marple (2004, Episode: A Murder Is Announced) as Detective Sergeant Fletcher
- Imagine Me & You (2005) as Trevor
- Oliver Twist (2005) as Farmer
- Doc Martin (2005, TV Series) as Eddie Rix
- As You Like It (2006) as Denis
- Dalziel and Pascoe episode "Guardian Angel" as Jim Webster
- Doctor Who (2007, Episodes: "Human Nature" and "The Family of Blood") as Mr Clark / Father of Mine
- Kingdom (2007-2009, TV Series) as DC Yelland
- Lark Rise to Candleford (2008, TV Series) as Mr Paxton
- The Bank Job (2008) as Det. Sgt. Roy Given
- Lewis (2010) as DC Hooper
- Appropriate Adult (2011, TV Mini-Series) as Howard Ogden
- My Week with Marilyn (2011) as Trevor
- DCI Banks (2011) as Les Holt
- Gambit (2012) as Mr. Knowles
- WPC 56 (2013) as Desk Sergeant Peter Pratt
- Midsomer Murders (2014, TV Series) as Ewan Evans
- Walter (2014, TV Movie) as D.S. Geoffrey Pollard
- Da Vinci's Demons (2014-2015, TV Series) as Rodrigo
- Detectorists (2014-2017, 2022, TV Series) as Terry Seymour
- Cinderella (2015) as Lord Veneering
- Beauty and the Beast (2017) as Monsieur Jean Potts
- Murder on the Orient Express (2017) as Aynesworth
- All Is True (2018) as Ben Jonson
- Artemis Fowl (2020) as Doctor Po
- Belfast (2021) as Mackie
- Allelujah (2022) as Mr. Earnshaw
- Death in Paradise (2025)

== Stage appearances (incomplete list) ==
- Jerusalem (2009 and 2022) as Wesley
- The Vote (2015) as Alan
- The Ferryman (2017) as Father Horrigan
- The Nativity at the National Theatre.
- Firewing (2026) at the Hampstead Theatre.
