= Martha Jones =

Fictional character from Doctor Who and Torchwood

- Doctor Who character
- Freema Agyeman as Martha Jones
- First appearance: "Smith and Jones" (2007)
- Created by: Russell T Davies
- Portrayed by: Freema Agyeman
- Shared universe appearances: Torchwood (2008)
- Duration: 2007–2008, 2010

In-universe information
- Full name: Martha Smith-Jones
- Title: Doctor
- Affiliation: Tenth Doctor; UNIT; Torchwood; NHS
- Family: Clive Jones (father); Francine Jones (mother); Letitia Jones (sister); Leo Jones (brother)
- Spouse: Mickey Smith
- Significant other: Thomas Milligan (ex-fiance)
- Children: August (son)
- Relatives: Adeola Oshodi (cousin)
- Origin: London, England

Martha Jones is a fictional character played by Freema Agyeman in the long-running British science fiction television series Doctor Who and its spin-off series, Torchwood. Notably Doctor Who's first black female companion, she was introduced in the third series as a companion of the Tenth Doctor. According to the character's creator Russell T Davies in his non-fiction book Doctor Who: The Writer's Tale, Martha was developed from the beginning with the intention of appearing for the whole of the 2007 series, and to make guest appearances in subsequent series and crossover appearances in the show's two spin-offs; Martha subsequently made guest appearances in Torchwood series two and in Doctor Who series four in 2008 and special episode "The End of Time" in 2010. Martha was also intended to make guest appearances in the 2009 series of Torchwood and The Sarah Jane Adventures, but could not due to the actress's other work commitments.

Within the series' narrative, Martha begins as a medical student who becomes the Doctor's time travelling companion after an incident at the hospital where she works. After more than a year of travelling with the Doctor (from both their perspectives), Martha parts from the Doctor's company as she recognises how unhealthy their relationship has been. After returning to life on Earth, becoming engaged and finishing her medical degree, Martha finds a newfound level of independence when she is recruited into the paranormal military organisations UNIT and, briefly, Torchwood.

== Appearances ==
=== Television ===
Freema Agyeman's first appearance in Doctor Who was in the second series (2006) episode, "Army of Ghosts", where she played Adeola Oshodi, Martha's cousin.

Martha Jones is introduced in the third series (2007) of Doctor Who, first appearing in the episode "Smith and Jones". When the hospital she works at is teleported to the Moon, medical student Martha helps save the day alongside an alien time traveller known only as the Doctor (David Tennant). During this event, the Doctor out of necessity gives Martha a kiss and she becomes smitten with him. To thank her for her help, the Doctor invites her to join him for a supposed single trip in his time machine the TARDIS, but later accepts her as his full-time "companion", admitting that she was "never just a passenger", and he even gives her the key to the TARDIS in the episode, "42". Martha becomes frustrated because the Doctor is oblivious to her feelings for him, and she expresses concern that she is simply a rebound after the Doctor's painful loss of his previous companion, Rose Tyler. When the amnesiac Doctor falls in love in the two-part story "Human Nature" and "The Family of Blood", a pained Martha laments "You had to go and fall in love with a human... and it wasn't me". In the series finale, "The Sound of Drums" and "Last of the Time Lords", in which the Doctor's nemesis the Master (John Simm) takes over planet Earth, capturing both the Doctor and fellow companion Captain Jack Harkness (John Barrowman), Martha manages to escape by teleporting away but is left alone to save the world. On the run from the Master, she spends a year travelling the world in a plan which restores the incapacitated Doctor and reverses time, undoing the Master's actions. Able to remember the events during the Master's reign, Martha then leaves the TARDIS of her own accord, telling the Doctor that she cannot waste her life pining for someone when the relationship cannot happen, but promises that she will see him again. Martha, as voiced by Freema Agyeman, also appears in the 2007 animated serial The Infinite Quest, which aired in twelve weekly segments during the run of the 2007 series.

Martha reappears in the second series (2008) of the Doctor Who spin-off, Torchwood, which focuses on Captain Jack Harkness. First appearing in the episode "Reset" as part of a three-episode story arc, Martha has been temporarily drafted to the Torchwood Institute|Torchwood organisation of alien-hunters by Jack, requiring a medical expert on alien life. Through exposition, it is revealed that Martha has become a "medical officer" for the international paranormal investigations agency UNIT since qualifying as a Doctor of Medicine. Martha briefly joins the Cardiff-based Torchwood Three as its medical officer following the death of Owen Harper (Burn Gorman) but later leaves the organisation in the episode "A Day in the Death" once she is satisfied that Owen is fit to return to duty following his resurrection. Later in the fourth series of Doctor Who (2008), Martha returns for a three-episode arc beginning with the two-part story, "The Sontaran Stratagem" and "The Poison Sky", and ending with "The Doctor's Daughter", in which she meets the Doctor's new companion Donna Noble (Catherine Tate); in the first episode, a more assertive and engaged Martha summons the Doctor to Earth to help uncover a plot by the Sontarans. Martha returns again for the final two episodes of the series, "The Stolen Earth" and "Journey's End", where she has been promoted to a U.S. division of UNIT and is working on a top-secret teleportation project based on Sontaran technology. She rallies alongside fellow companions Jack and Sarah Jane Smith (Elisabeth Sladen) in an effort to face the threat of Davros' (Julian Bleach) plot to destroy reality. In facing Davros, Martha threatens to set off nuclear warheads, which will destroy the Earth in order to spare human suffering and curtail his plans, but is stopped by the Doctor. In the episode's dénouement, Martha leaves with Jack and former companion Mickey Smith (Noel Clarke), with Jack saying to her, "I'm not sure about UNIT these days... maybe there's something else you could be doing."

Despite the set-up at the end of Doctor Who series four, Martha does not appear in Torchwood: Children of Earth (2009). Martha's absence is explained when the characters interact with UNIT officers in Children of Earth; she is on her honeymoon. In lieu of Martha, the character of Lois Habiba (Cush Jumbo) was created. A scene in "The End of Time" (2010) shows Martha, apparently having left UNIT, fighting aliens with Mickey and marrying him rather than her previous fiancé. The Doctor appears to the pair shortly before his pending regeneration to save them from a Sontaran sniper. Agyeman is credited as portraying Martha Smith-Jones.

=== Literature ===
Aside from television appearances, the character of Martha also appears in Doctor Who novels and comic books, some of which are ambiguous in terms of their canonicity in relationship to the television series. In books, Martha appears in the "New Series Adventures" series of Doctor Who novels, published by BBC Books. The first book published was a "Quick Reads" novel, Made of Steel by Terrance Dicks (published prior to her first television appearance), and the character subsequently appeared in all novels in the series, starting with Sting of the Zygons by Stephen Cole and most recently in The Many Hands by Dale Smith. Freema Agyeman physically represents the character on the cover of every novel. In late 2008 The Story of Martha, a collection of stories focusing on Martha's adventures between "The Sound of Drums" and "Last of the Time Lords" was published.

In terms of comic book appearances, Martha has appeared in the Doctor Who Magazine strips from #381 onwards and the Doctor Who Adventures comics from #28 onwards. The character also periodically appears in the Battles in Time series of comic books. In 2007, American comic book publisher IDW Publishing (publisher of various Angel, Star Trek and The Transformers comic titles) announced their plans to do a devoted series of Tenth Doctor and Martha comics for an American audience. When asked about canonicity, IDW executive editor Chris Ryall dodged the issue by saying all the comics are "blessed" by Russell T Davies but it is up to the individual how canonical each story is.

=== Audio drama ===
Martha also appears in a BBC Radio 4 Torchwood drama, "Lost Souls", which aired in Summer 2008 as an Afternoon Play featuring the voices of the Torchwood cast and Freema Agyeman. Set between the events of the 2008 series of Torchwood but prior to the Doctor Who finale that year, Martha recruits Jack, Ianto Jones (Gareth David-Lloyd) and Gwen Cooper (Eve Myles) on Torchwood's first international adventure, as part of Radio 4's special celebration of the Large Hadron Collider being switched on at CERN in Geneva. The special radio episode's plot focuses on the Large Hadron Collider's activation and the doomsday scenario some predicted it might incite, as well as the Torchwood team's mourning of Toshiko Sato (Naoko Mori) and Owen's recent deaths in the Torchwood second series finale.

Martha made her Big Finish Productions debut in the Torchwood audio drama "Dissected", released in February 2020. In July 2021, Big Finish announced a new series starring Agyeman - The Year of Martha Jones - depicting Martha during her year travelling an Earth ruled by the Master, co-starring Adjoa Andoh as Martha's mother Francine, which was released in December.

== Characterisation ==
=== Conception ===
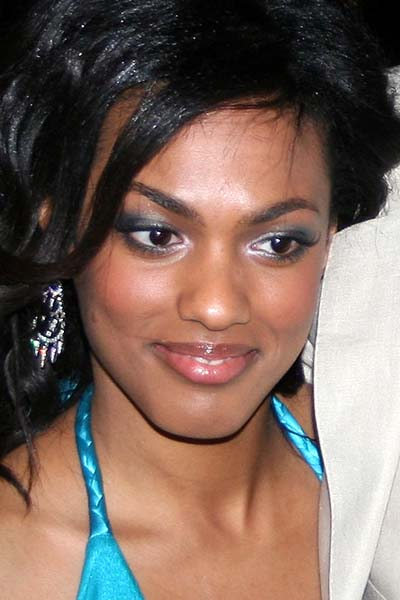
Freema Agyeman (pictured in 2007) was cast as Martha Jones.

The introduction of Martha as the next companion after Billie Piper's Rose Tyler was announced by the BBC in a 5 July 2006 press release. The character is a 23-year-old medical student from 2008, although earlier in the conception process, she had been meant to come from the year 1914. Like Rose, Martha has family members who are seen in the programme: Adjoa Andoh plays her mother Francine, with Trevor Laird as her father Clive (divorced from Francine), Gugu Mbatha-Raw as her sister Tish, and Reggie Yates as her brother Leo. Nevertheless, Agyeman notes that Martha is "very independent"; living alone and having almost completed her medical qualifications. She does not have an ex-boyfriend, but writer Russell T Davies has stated that she is not a lesbian, as had been rumoured in some quarters.

Freema Agyeman told the school publication The Newspaper that Martha is older and more secure than Rose. Agyeman speculated that Martha, by contrast, travels with the Doctor for the adventure, rather than because of a need for guidance or education (Agyeman also told The Newspaper that Martha hopes to eventually go back to Earth and finish her medical education). In addition, Martha's family appears to be of a higher social class than Rose's; whereas Rose's family was fairly typically working class, Martha's family appears to be wealthier, her father owns what appears to be a late model Mercedes-Benz convertible.

Drawing from her creator's pool of recurring names, Martha and her family share the last name "Jones" with many other Russell T Davies-penned characters. Foremost among them are Harriet Jones in Doctor Who, Ianto Jones and Eugene Jones in Torchwood, Ianto Jones in Mine All Mine and Stuart Allen Jones in Queer as Folk. Davies states that reusing names (such as Tyler, Smith, Harper, Harkness and Jones) allows him to get a grip of the character on the blank page. In casting Martha, the actress Freema Agyeman was reused from her minor role as Adeola Oshodi, in the Series 2 episode "Army of Ghosts". Acknowledging this, the resemblance of the two characters was touched upon in "Smith and Jones" when Martha refers to her deceased cousin, also serving to connect Martha to the larger Doctor Who universe.

=== Development ===
Throughout Doctor Who series three, Martha pined for the Doctor's affection. In its final story — "Last of the Time Lords", separated from the Doctor for a year, Martha Jones travelled the world to initiate a psychic plan that restored the incapacitated Doctor, allowing him to reverse time and therefore undo the Master’s actions. Martha then decides to return to Earth, aiming to qualify as a medical doctor, look after her devastated family, and move on from her unrequited feelings for the Doctor.

Following the airdate of "Last of the Time Lords", the BBC announced that the character would return to screens in three episodes of Torchwood Series 2, before rejoining David Tennant's Tenth Doctor alongside new companion Donna Noble (Catherine Tate) for five episodes in the fourth series of Doctor Who. Appearing in Torchwood, it is explained through exposition that Martha is a medical specialist for UNIT, a qualified doctor and bona fide expert on alien life. First appearing on the spin-off series in Torchwood episode "Reset", fellow companion Jack Harkness establishes Martha's credibility to her new peers, slyly commenting upon her vast experience. John Barrowman noted that Martha entered Torchwood as their superior in many ways, as being employed by UNIT placed her in a higher authority. In the same episode, Martha notes that an "impeccable source" recommended her employment at UNIT, implying the Doctor has the highest faith in Martha's capability. Her Torchwood outfit was specifically designed to reflect her development, with Costume designer Ray Holman stating: "We wanted to give her that air of authority, with some professional-looking and quite classy fitted suits".

Martha is first seen in action with UNIT in "The Sontaran Stratagem", where Donna Noble, the Doctor's current companion, reacts with shock, asking derisively if the Doctor turns all of his companions into "soldiers". The Doctor also appears to disapprove of the situation until Martha defends her intentions, reminding the Doctor that she herself does not carry a gun and stating that she is trying to make UNIT "better" from the inside. Agyeman herself states that she was never in any worry about Martha becoming too gun-toting:

"I never felt any danger of that happening. At the end of Series Three, she'd struggled for a year, and travelled alone, and saw all this hardship, her family tortured... that's going to have affected her. At the same time, she's continued in her studies to become a doctor, so obviously she still has this caring side to her".

Martha tells Owen in the Torchwood episode "Reset" that she has a boyfriend, who is revealed to be paediatric doctor Thomas Milligan in "The Sontaran Stratagem", by which time the two are engaged — indicating that Martha has gotten over her love for the Doctor. In "The Poison Sky", she cites her relationship with Thomas Milligan as a reason to stay on Earth, rather than join Donna and the Doctor in the TARDIS — saying that she's now got a great big adventure of her own to enjoy. Agyeman feels that Martha's relationship with Tom has "helped cement where she is in life". Agyeman also thinks that it was important for Martha's mother, Francine, to reappear in "The Stolen Earth"/"Journey's End", as closure for what happened to the Jones family in Series Three: "It's great for the audience to know that all this talk of Martha wanting to stay on Earth because of her family is for real. It's great to see Adjoa there, representing the Jones clan, even though it's a fleeting appearance. She's still very much in Martha's life".

Director Euros Lyn comments that the production team had intended for Agyeman and Clarke to join Torchwood for its third series, but their careers led them elsewhere. When the characters interact with UNIT officers in Children of Earth, Martha's absence is explained by her being on honeymoon. Head writer and executive producer Russell T Davies explains that Agyeman was cast in Law & Order: UK before Children of Earth had been officially commissioned. She chose Law & Order over Torchwood because it offered a fuller schedule of 13 episodes, whereas the latter had been reduced to only five. In response, Davies created the character of Lois Habiba, played by Cush Jumbo, to be a "kind of a Martha figure", one with added innocence who is out of her depth. Agyeman does not rule out returning to the show at a later date, however. Davies reveals in his non-fiction book Doctor Who: The Writer's Tale that Martha was also intended to appear in The Sarah Jane Adventures series two finale Enemy of the Bane in December 2008, but the character had to be replaced with classic series character Brigadier Lethbridge-Stewart (Nicholas Courtney) "at the last minute" due to Agyeman's role in Law & Order: UK; had Martha appeared, the character would have appeared in all three programmes in the franchise.

== Analyses ==
Analyses of the character typically focus on the character's ethnicity (Agyeman herself was born to Ghanaian and Iranian parents), her social class (middle class). Martha has been described in newspaper reports as the first ethnic-minority companion in Doctor Who. In her introduction, Martha is represented as 'normal' in a way that previous Doctor Who companions were not. For example, she becomes the first character to use light swear words when she exclaims, "We're on the bloody moon!" Davies felt that this level of swearing was both normal and appropriate, citing a Harry Potter film in which the young audience reacted with laughter rather than shock when a young character cursed "Bloody hell".

=== Racial issues ===
In the episode "The Shakespeare Code", the Doctor is unconcerned when Martha, who has Black ancestry, wonders if she is safe regarding slavery. Slavery was never established by positive law in England, as Somerset v Stewart (1772) clarified. Martha reacts with possible offence to William Shakespeare's use of Elizabethan terms for black people, such as "blackamoor" and "ethiop", but the Doctor quips that it is "political correctness gone mad". Martha realises Shakespeare is actually enamoured of her. At the end of the episode, he calls her his "Dark Lady", the name given to the woman the real Shakespeare referred to in a number of Shakespeare's sonnets; (Note: Sonnets CXXVII-CLIV) by implication, Martha is the Dark Lady.

In "Human Nature", set during 1913, in addition to jibes of private school boys, a nurse refuses to believe that Martha is a medical student in the future, saying, "Women might train to be doctors, but hardly a skivvy and hardly one of your colour". When the TARDIS crew are nationally declared as public enemies in "The Sound of Drums", the Master (Simm) says that the Doctor's current companions "tick every demographic box" – referring to Martha's gender and ethnicity and Jack's sexual orientation. He later refers to Jack Harkness and Martha Jones as "the girlie and the freak", adding to the insult by claiming he is not sure which is which.

=== Female role model ===
As a young medical professional, Martha has been the focus of studies which discuss young girls' perceptions of "gendered representations of science, technology, engineering and mathematics (STEM)". Through questionnaires, researchers for The UK Resource Centre for Women in Science, Engineering Technology asked Key Stage 3, KS4 and KS5-age students to "identify three of their favourite television programmes and to try and recall, and describe, a television programme they had watched that was about science or included a scientist." The researchers narrowed down these selections to just two programmes which "feature within the favourite programmes for both boys and girls... The Simpsons (Channel 4) and Doctor Who (BBC)." The research was further analysed "the representation of STEM-related topics" through the programmes' two prominent, respective, female characters: Lisa Simpson (Yeardley Smith) and Martha Jones; these characters were selected in light of Steinke. et al.'s suggestion that "presenting positive televised images of women scientists may be a particularly effective strategy for providing role models to promote girls' interest in science, particularly when direct interaction with human role models is not possible". The article points out that Martha and Lisa are quite different: primarily, "Lisa is represented as being different from many of her peers... a 'child genius'... considered to be 'extraordinary'", whereas Martha "is represented as being a comparatively 'normal' young woman", who unlike Lisa invites self-identification. Martha's attempts to diagnose a patient in her debut episode are criticised as faulty; it is her "responses to the extraordinary situations that she later finds herself in, rather than her everyday life" which distinguish Martha. Her "normal" status is also highlighted when she becomes the first character "to be heard swearing" in Doctor Who. In spite of their differences, however, many commonalities were brought to light by the research.

Lisa and Martha are both represented as characters who, rather than lacking social skills, play "a central role within their families' relationships" (David X. Cohen describes Lisa as "the heart of the family", Davies describes Martha as a "sort of peace-maker within her family"); "Martha's family," the article says, "and her relationships with them, are part of the narrative that runs throughout the series", who are her constant despite the time travel aspect of the series. "[H]owever fantastic and 'unreal' the experiences of Martha and Lisa might be, their characters are always situated within a set of family relationships that most viewers would recognise as being fairly commonplace." Whereas in The Simpsons, Lisa is the character most identified with knowledge and worldliness, in Doctor Who that character is the Doctor. The power relationship this affords the Doctor and Martha is challenged, in Martha's favour, for the first time in "42", when an alien possession leaves the Doctor "scared"; according to Agyeman, Martha "has to take control". This independence is continued in "Human Nature"/"The Family of Blood", of which Davies says, "Martha is left facing the monsters alone. The whole story wouldn't work if the Doctor didn't trust Martha". Martha is also asked to save the world singlehandedly in "The Sound of Drums"/"Last of the Time Lords". When Martha next appears in Torchwood, as a UNIT officer and qualified M.D., "the audience has been able to follow Martha's career and watch her gain in both expertise and confidence." In their summary, the researchers concluded: "In discussing our analysis of [Lisa Simpson and Martha Jones] we have highlighted ways in which they could be viewed both as characters with which young people can identify, but also as characters that provide positive role models in terms of their relationship to STEM.
