= Phil Collinson =

British television producer (born 1970)

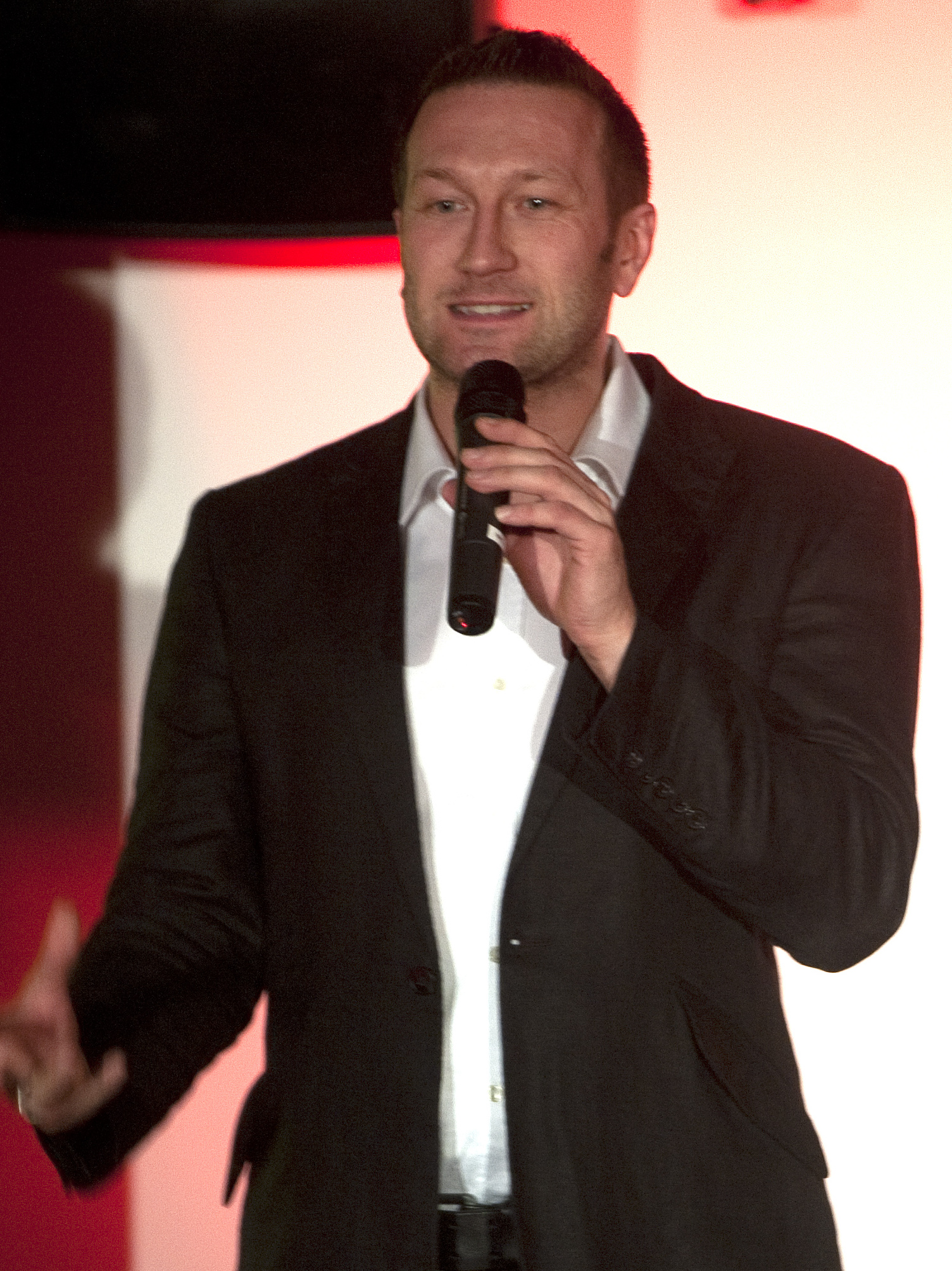
- Collinson in 2012
- Born: 26 August 1970 (age 56)
- Occupations: TV producer; actor
- Years active: 1998–present
- Employer: ITV
- Notable work: See below
- Television: Coronation Street; Doctor Who
- Spouse: Peter Hughes (m. 2024)

Philip Collinson (born 26 August 1970) is a British television producer. He was initially an actor, before switching to working behind the cameras in the industry as a script editor and writer on programmes such as Springhill and Emmerdale, later becoming the producer of Peak Practice, Doctor Who and Coronation Street.

== Career ==
Collinson has produced several series for the BBC, including the comedy drama Linda Green, and the first seasons of 1950s-set Born and Bred and paranormal thriller Sea of Souls. In January 2004, he started work as the tenth full-time in-house producer of the BBC science-fiction programme Doctor Who.

While he was an actor, the role of Alexander in the 1999 Channel 4 drama Queer as Folk was written especially for him by his friend Russell T Davies. However, after Antony Cotton auditioned for the production team, Davies and his fellow producers felt they had no choice but to offer the role to him instead of Collinson.

Collinson took a break from his Doctor Who production responsibilities for part of the 2007 series; Susie Liggat took his place for a month according to issue 372 of Doctor Who Magazine, while Collinson took a holiday. There was some confusion when Collinson's break was first announced, with some reports claiming that Collinson was leaving the series. "There was this whole madness last year when it was announced that... Susie was going to produce a couple of episodes," Collinson told Doctor Who Magazine in issue 380, "cos everyone immediately thought that I was leaving, and she was taking over. My friends thought I was seriously ill! Why else would I leave Doctor Who?" Collinson's holiday coincided with the filming of the two-parter "Human Nature"/"The Family of Blood"; he does however receive an executive producer credit for these episodes. Liggat also produced five episodes of the 2008 series.

Collinson also served as an executive producer on the CBBC Doctor Who spin-off The Sarah Jane Adventures.

The BBC confirmed on 1 February 2008 that Collinson would be leaving his position on Doctor Who, to return to Manchester as BBC Head of Drama for the region. After less than two years in this role, it was announced in late 2009 than Collinson would be leaving the BBC to take over as producer of ITV's top-rated soap opera Coronation Street.

Collinson is gay, and admits that Doctor Who has a special appeal for LGBT people: "I can only talk for myself, and when I was a teenager," he said in a March 2007 interview. "For me, as a young boy and a teenager, growing up in the north of England, in a world where I could never imagine being a gay man, let alone settling down and finding someone, I think Doctor Who was really asexual. There were programmes like The Sweeney which were very much about men chasing women, men getting women, whereas with Doctor Who you had a show that never really dealt with that." In September 2024, he married Peter Hughes.

In July 2010 Collinson took over from Kim Crowther, as the new producer of Coronation Street. His first credited episode aired on 26 July 2010.

On 8 October 2012, it was announced that Collinson will step down as Producer of Coronation Street as of March 2013 and be replaced by Emmerdale Producer Stuart Blackburn.

On 20 January 2022, it was confirmed Collinson would return to Doctor Who as a producer, working again under Russell T Davies.

== Occupations ==
=== Writer ===
- Emmerdale (1998)

=== Director ===
- Peak Practice (1 episode, 2000)

=== Producer ===
- Linda Green (2001)
- Born and Bred (6 episodes, 2002)
- Sea of Souls (6 episodes, 2004)
- Doctor Who (48 episodes, 2005–08)
- Coronation Street (711 episodes, 2010–13)
- Midwinter of the Spirit (3 episodes, 2015)
- Bancroft (4 episodes, 2017)
- Good Omens (6 episodes, 2019)
- Gentleman Jack (16 episodes, 2019–22)
- It's a Sin (5 episodes, 2021)
- Tip Toe (5 episodes, 2026)

=== Executive producer ===
- Doctor Who (2007–08, 2023–present)
- The Sarah Jane Adventures (11 episodes, 2007)
- The Watch (8 episodes, 2021)
- Tales of the TARDIS (7 episodes, 2023–2024)
- The War Between the Land and the Sea (5 episodes, 2025)

=== Head of Drama ===
- BBC Manchester (2008–10)

Preceded by Peter V. Ware	Doctor Who Producer; 2005–08	Succeeded by Susie Liggat

Media offices
Preceded by Kim Crowther	Producer of Coronation Street; 2010–13	Succeeded by Stuart Blackburn
