= List of David Tennant performances =

Filmography, theatrography, ludography and audio credits

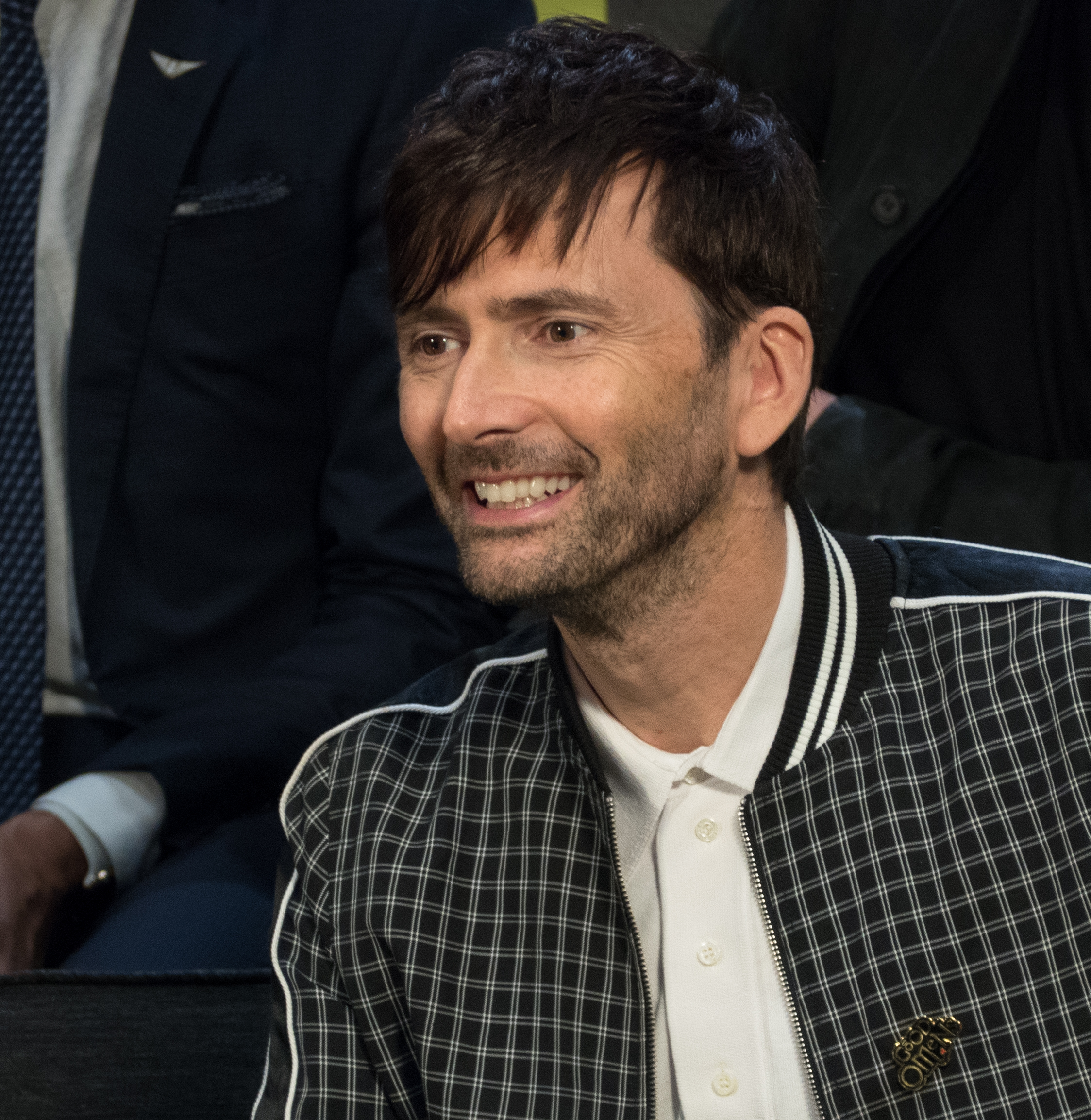
Tennant in 2018

This is a list of performances by Scottish actor David Tennant.

Key
†	Denotes works that have not yet been released

== Film ==
Year	Title	Role	Notes	Ref.
1996	Jude	Drunk undergraduate		
1998	L.A. Without a Map	Richard		
1999	The Last September	Captain Gerald Colthurst		
2000	Being Considered	Larry		
2003	Bright Young Things	Ginger Littlejohn		
2005	Harry Potter and the Goblet of Fire	Barty Crouch Jr.		
2006	Free Jimmy	Hamish	Voice	
2009	Glorious 39	Hector		
2009	St Trinian's 2: The Legend of Fritton's Gold	Sir Piers Pomfrey		
2010	How to Train Your Dragon	Spitelout	Voice	
2011	The Decoy Bride	James Arber		
2011	Fright Night	Peter Vincent		
2011	The Itch of the Golden Nit	Stretchy McStretch	Voice	
2012	The Pirates! In an Adventure with Scientists!	Charles Darwin	Voice	
2012	Nativity 2: Danger in the Manger	Donald Peterson, Roderick Peterson		
2014	Postman Pat: The Movie	Wilf	Voice	
2014	What We Did on Our Holiday	Doug		
2015	Chew	Mason Savoy	Voice; unfinished film; unreleased	
2015	Reds and Grays	Robbie	Voice	
2016	Fireman Sam: Alien Alert	Buck Douglas	Voice	
2017	Mad to Be Normal	R. D. Laing		
2017	Ferdinand	Angus	Voice	
2017	You, Me and Him	John		
2018	Bad Samaritan	Cale Erendreich		
2018	Mary Queen of Scots	John Knox		
2019	How to Train Your Dragon: The Hidden World	Spitelout, Ivar the Witless	Voice	
2021	The Loud House Movie	Angus	Voice	
2022	Chip 'n Dale: Rescue Rangers	Scrooge McDuck	Voice (cameo)	
2022	The Amazing Maurice	Dangerous Beans	Voice	
2025	The Thursday Murder Club	Ian Ventham		
2027	The Neverending Pillow Fort†	Murray	Voice	
2027	The Amazing Maurice - The Waters of Life†	Dangerous Beans	Voice	
TBA	The Joy of Sex		Filming	

== Television ==
Year	Title	Role	Notes	Ref.
1988	Dramarama	Neil McDonald	Episode: "The Secret of Croftmore"	
1989	The Play on One	Third squaddie	Episode: "Biting the Hands"	
1992	Strathblair	Archie the Hiker	Episode: "Family Affairs"	
1992	Bunch of Five	Policeman	Episode: "Miles Better"	
1993	The Brown Man	Ventriloquist	Television film	
1993	Rab C. Nesbitt	Davina	Episode: "Touch"	
1994	Takin' Over the Asylum	Campbell Bain	6 episodes	
1995	The Tales of Para Handy	John MacBryde	Episode: "Para Handy's Piper"	
1995	The Bill	Steve Clemens	Episode: "Deadline"	
1996	A Mug's Game	Gavin	Episode: #1.2	
1997	Holding the Baby	Nurse	Episode: #1.2	
1997	Conjuring Shakespeare	Angelo	Episode: "Like a Virgin"	
1998	Duck Patrol	Simon "Darwin" Brown	7 episodes	
1999	The Mrs Bradley Mysteries	Max Valentine	Episode: "Death at the Opera"	
1999	Love in the 21st Century	John	Episode: "Reproduction"	
2000	Randall & Hopkirk (Deceased)	Gordon Stylus	Episode: "Drop Dead"	
2001	People Like Us	Rob Harker	Episode: "The Actor"	
2001	High Stakes	Gaz Whitney	Episode: "The Magic Word"	
2001	Only Human	Tyler	TV pilot	
2002	Foyle's War	Theo Howard	Episode: "A Lesson in Murder"	
2003	Trust	Gavin MacEwan	Episode: #1.6	
2003	Posh Nosh	Jose-Luis	2 episodes	
2003	Spine Chillers	Dr. Krull	Episode: "Bradford in My Dreams"	
2003	Terri McIntyre	Greig Millar	6 episodes	
2003	Scream of the Shalka	Warehouseman (voice)	Episode: #1.5	
2004	The Deputy	Christopher Williams	Television film	
2004	He Knew He Was Right	Mr. Gibson	4 episodes	
2004	Blackpool	DI Peter Carlisle	6 episodes	
2005	Casanova	Giacomo Casanova	3 episodes	
2005	The Quatermass Experiment	Dr. Gordon Briscoe	Television film	
2005	Secret Smile	Brendan Block	2 episodes	
2005–2010, 2013	Doctor Who	Tenth Doctor	49 episodes Series 1, 2, 3, 4, 2008–2010 specials, 50th anniversary special "The Day of the Doctor"	
2006	The Romantics	Jean-Jacques Rousseau	Episode: "Liberty"	
2006	The Chatterley Affair	Richard Hoggart	Television film	
2007	Recovery	Alan Hamilton	Television film	
2007	The Catherine Tate Show	Mr. Logan, The Doctor	Sketch for Red Nose Day 2007	
2007	Dead Ringers	Regenerated Tony Blair	Episode: #7.6	
2007	The Infinite Quest	Tenth Doctor (voice)	Television film	
2007	Learners	Chris	Television film	
2007	Extras	Himself	Episode: "The Extra Special Series Finale"	
2008	Music of the Spheres	Tenth Doctor	Television film	
2008	Einstein and Eddington	Arthur Eddington	Television film	
2009	The Sarah Jane Adventures	Tenth Doctor	Story: "The Wedding of Sarah Jane Smith"	
2009	Dreamland	Tenth Doctor (voice)	6 episodes	
2009	The Catherine Tate Show	Ghost of Christmas Present	Episode: "Nan's Christmas Carol"	
2009	Hamlet	Prince Hamlet	Television film	
2010	Rex Is Not Your Lawyer	Rex Alexander	NBC pilot (unaired)	
2010	Single Father	Dave Tiler	4 episodes	
2011	United	Jimmy Murphy	Television film	
2011	This Is Jinsy	Mr. Slightlyman	Episode: "Wedding Lottery"	
2012	Playhouse Presents	Will	Episode: "The Minor Character"	
2012	True Love	Nick	Episode: "Nick"	
2012	Star Wars: The Clone Wars	Huyang (voice)	3 episodes	
2012	Tree Fu Tom	Twigs (voice)	27 episodes	
2012–2018	DreamWorks Dragons	Spitelout (voice)	14 episodes	
2013	Spies of Warsaw	Jean-François Mercier	4 episodes	
2013	Fish Hooks	Oscar's Brain (voice)	2 episodes	
2013	The Politician's Husband	Aiden Hoynes	3 episodes	
2013	The Escape Artist	Will Burton	3 episodes	
2013	The Five(ish) Doctors Reboot	Himself	Television film	
2013	The Great Scott	Walter Scott	3 episodes	
2013–2017	Broadchurch	DI Alec Hardy	24 episodes	
2014	Gracepoint	Emmett Carver	10 episodes	
2015	Jake and the Never Land Pirates	Dread (voice)	2 episodes	
2015	Mickey Mouse Clubhouse	Igor the Door (voice)	Episode: "Mickey's Monster Musical"	
2015–2016	Teenage Mutant Ninja Turtles	Fugitoid (voice)	15 episodes	
2015–2019	Jessica Jones	Kevin Thompson / Kilgrave	Main cast (season 1); Guest role (season 2); Voice cameo (season 3); 13 episodes	
2016	Family Guy	Tenth Doctor (voice)	Episode: "Inside Family Guy"	
2016–2026	Have I Got News for You	Guest Host	10 episodes	
2017	Thunderbirds Are Go	Tycho Reeves (voice)	Episode: "Hyperspeed"	
2017	The Highway Rat	The Highway Rat (voice)	Television film	
2017–2021	DuckTales	Scrooge McDuck (voice)	60 episodes	
2018	Hang Ups	Martin Lamb	Episode: #1.2	
2018	Camping	Walt Jodell	8 episodes	
2018–2021	Final Space	Lord Commander (voice)	21 episodes	
2018–2023	There She Goes	Simon Yates	11 episodes	
2019	Criminal: UK	Dr. Edgar Fallon	Episode: "Edgar"	
2019–2021	Gen:Lock	Rufus Weller, Caliban (voice)	16 episodes	
2019–2026	Good Omens	Crowley	Main role; 13 episodes	
2020	Deadwater Fell	Tom Kendrick	4 episodes; also executive producer	
2020	Des	Dennis Nilsen	3 episodes; also executive producer	
2020–2022	Staged	David Tennant	20 episodes; also executive producer	
2021	Eden	E92 (voice)	4 episodes	
2021	Around the World in 80 Days	Phileas Fogg	Main role; 8 episodes; also executive producer	
2022	The Legend of Vox Machina	General Krieg (voice)	2 episodes	
2022	Meet the Richardsons	David Tennant	2 episodes	
2022	The Sandman	Don (voice)	Episode: "A Dream of a Thousand Cats"	
2022	Inside Man	Reverend Harry Watling	4 episodes	
2022	The Paloni Show! Halloween Special	Roach Chef (voice)	Segment: "Clacky's Café"	
2022	Litvinenko	Alexander Litvinenko	4 episode ITV drama series; also executive producer	
2022–2023	Doctor Who	Fourteenth Doctor	Lead role, 4 episodes; "The Power of the Doctor", 60th anniversary specials	
2023	Clone High	Himself (voice)	Episode: "Saved by the Knoll"	
2023	The Simpsons	Pa MacWeldon (voice)	Episode: "Ae Bonny Romance"	
2023–present	Ahsoka	Huyang (voice)	8 episodes	
2024	Moon Girl and Devil Dinosaur	Franklin (voice)	Episode: "Dog Day Mid-Afternoon"	
2024	Star Wars: Young Jedi Adventures	Huyang (voice)	Episode: "Nubs' Big Mistake"	
2024–present	Rivals	Lord Tony Baddingham	14 episodes	
2024–present	Ark: The Animated Series	Sir Edmund Rockwell (voice)	3 episodes	
2025	Chibiverse	Scrooge McDuck (voice)	Episode: "Stan's 11"	
2025	Genius Game	Host	Eight-part game show	
2025	The Assembly	Himself	ITV interview series	
2025	Big City Greens	Lord Argyle (voice)	Episode: “Saxon Saxability”	
2025	The Hack	Nick Davies	Also executive producer	
2025 - 2026	Gogglebox	Himself	Series 26 (Celebrity Gogglebox for SU2C) & Series 28 (Gogglebox for SU2C)	
2026	Spidey and His Amazing Friends	Web Beard (voice)	Episode: "The Return of Web-Beard"	
2026	The Four Seasons	Gianpiero	Episode: "Maratona"	
2026	Time	Officer Bailey	Main cast (series 3)	
TBA	Only Murders in the Building	TBA	Series Six	
TBA	Standing By†	TBA	Upcoming eight-part TV series	
TBA	Hide †	TBA	Pre-production	

== Narration ==
Year	Title	Notes	Ref.
2005	Doctor Who: A New Dimension	Doctor Who Confidential pilot	
2007	The Human Footprint		
2008	Everest ER		
2009	Swarm: Nature's Incredible Invasions		
2009	Troubled Young Minds		
2010	Caught in the Web – A Newsround Special		
2010	Eddie Izzard: Marathon Man		
2010	Diet or My Husband Dies		
2010	Stealing Shakespeare		
2010	Polar Bear: Spy on the Ice	BBC Wildlife Specials	
2011	The Father of Australia		
2011	Starlight: For the Children		
2011	The TA & The Taliban		
2011	Gerry Rafferty: Right Down the Line		
2011	Shrek: Once Upon a Time		
2011	Earthflight		
2011–2012	Twenty Twelve		
2012	Wild About Pandas		
2012	Our Secret Universe: The Hidden Life of the Cell		
2013	Penguins – Spy in the Huddle		
2014	Dolphins – Spy in the Pod	BBC Wildlife Specials	
2014–2024	W1A	Sequel to Twenty Twelve	
2015	Pets – Wild at Heart	BBC Wildlife Specials	
2015	Growing Up Wild	BBC Wildlife Specials	
2015	Knights of Classic Drama		
2015	Dames of Classic Drama		
2015	Inside Einstein's Mind: The Enigma of Space and Time	British version only	
2017	Gudrun The Viking Princess		
2020	Spy in the Wild		
2020	Red Dwarf: The First Three Million Years		
2023	Spy in the Ocean		
2026	Twenty Twenty Six	Sequel to W1A	
2026	Ages of Ice	Three-part documentary by Northern Pictures	

== Short films ==
Year	Title	Role	Notes	Ref.
1987	Anti-smoking film	Jim	Glasgow Health Board PSA	
1993	Spaces	Vinny		
1996	Quality Control	Gary Innes	Short film, rescued from 16mm print	
1997	Bite	Alastair Galbraith		
2001	Sweetnight Goodheart	Peter		
2002	Nine 1/2 Minutes	Charlie	Short film	
2002	Boots UK advert	Husband		
2004	Traffic Warden	Traffic warden		
2004	Old Street	Mr. Watson	Short film	
2005	"Born Again"	Tenth Doctor	Children in Need 2005 Doctor Who special	
2007	"Time Crash"	Tenth Doctor	Children in Need 2007 Doctor Who special	
2015	96 Ways to Say I Love You	Mark		
2020	Heart to Heart	Heart		
2020	Screening	Timothy		
2020	Fare Well	Voice-over		
2023	"Destination: Skaro"	Fourteenth Doctor	Children In Need 2023 Doctor Who special	
2023	Doctor Who: The Bedtime Story	Fourteenth Doctor, Narrator		

== Stage ==
Year	Title	Role	Notes	Ref.
1989	The Ghost of Benjy O'Neil	Benjy O'Neil	Phantom Productions	
1990	Fools	Leon Steponovitch Tolchinsky	Made in Glasgow (RSAMD Student Company), Chandler Studio Theatre, RSAMD	
1990	Twelve Angry Men	Juror 8	Theatre Positive Scotland, Arches Theatre; director Iain Reekie	
1991	The Fruits Of Enlightenment	Semyon	New Athenaeum Theatre, RSAMD	
1991	Mozart from A to Z	Mozart	New Athenaeum Theatre, RSAMD	
1991	The Resistible Rise of Arturo Ui	Various characters	7:84 Theatre Company Scotland	
1991–92	Shinda the Magic Ape	Kenny	Royal Lyceum Theatre	
1992	Jump the Life to Come	Malcolm	7:84 Theatre Company Scotland	
1992	Merlin	Arthur	Royal Lyceum Theatre	
1992	Scotland Matters	Various characters	7:84 Theatre Company Scotland	
1992	Hay Fever	Simon	Royal Lyceum Theatre	
1992	Who's Afraid of Virginia Woolf?	Nick	Dundee Repertory Theatre	
1992	Tartuffe	Valere	Dundee Repertory Theatre	
1992–93	Merlin the Magnificent and the Adventures of Arthur	Arthur	Dundee Repertory Theatre	
1993	Antigone	Haemon	7:84 Theatre Company Scotland	
1993–94	The Princess and the Goblin	Curdie	Dundee Repertory Theatre	
1994	Long Day's Journey into Night	Edmund	Dundee Repertory Theatre	
1994	The Slab Boys Trilogy	Alan	Young Vic	
1995	What the Butler Saw	Nick	Royal National Theatre	
1995	An Experienced Woman Gives Advice	Kenny	Royal Exchange Theatre, Manchester	
1996	The Glass Menagerie	Tom	Dundee Repertory Theatre	
1996	As You Like It	Touchstone	Royal Shakespeare Company	
1996	The General from America	Hamilton	Royal Shakespeare Company	
1996	The Herbal Bed	Jack Lane	Royal Shakespeare Company	
1997	Hurly Burly	Mickey	Old Vic; Queen's Theatre	
1997	Tamagotchi Heaven	Boyfriend	Did not appear on stage, only in a filmed segment	
1997	Matters of Life and Death – "Blue"	Himself	Chelsea Theatre	
1998	The Real Inspector Hound	Moon	Yvonne Arnaud Theatre, Richmond Theatre, Comedy Theatre (now the Harold Pinter)	
1998	Black Comedy	Brinsley Miller	Yvonne Arnaud Theatre, Richmond Theatre, Comedy Theatre (now the Harold Pinter)	
1998	For One Night Only	Performer	The Other Place; Performed as part of the Stratford-upon-Avon Fringe Festival on 19 July 1998	
1999	Vassa – Scenes from Family Life	Pavel	Albery Theatre	
1999	Edward III	Edward, the Black Prince	Shakespeare's Globe (staged reading)	
1999	King Lear	Edgar	Royal Exchange Theatre	
2000	The Comedy of Errors	Antipholus of Syracuse	Royal Shakespeare Company	
2000	The Rivals	Jack	Royal Shakespeare Company	
2000	Romeo and Juliet	Romeo	Royal Shakespeare Company	
2000	Laughter in the Dark	Dawid Tenemann	The Other Place (in a filmed segment)	
2001	A Midsummer Night's Dream	Lysander, Flute	Royal Shakespeare Company	
2001	Comedians	Gethin Price		
2001	Medea	Bodyguard	Royal National Theatre (staged reading)	
2002	Push-Up	Robert	Royal Court Theatre	
2002	Lobby Hero	Jeff	Donmar Warehouse; Ambassadors Theatre	
2003	London Concert for Peace	Performer of Nevertheless	Theatre Royal, Drury Lane	
2003–04	The Pillowman	Katurian	Royal National Theatre	
2004	The Fleer	Lord Piso	Shakespeare's Globe (staged reading at the Globe Education Centre)	
2005	Look Back in Anger	Jimmy Porter	Theatre Royal, Bath; Royal Lyceum Theatre	
2006	Look Back in Anger	Jimmy Porter	Royal Court Theatre (staged reading)	
2008	Hamlet	Hamlet	Royal Shakespeare Company; Novello Theatre	
2008	Love's Labour's Lost	Berowne	Royal Shakespeare Company	
2010	Celebrity Autobiography	Various characters	Leicester Square Theatre	
2011	Much Ado About Nothing	Benedick	Wyndham's Theatre	
2013–14	Richard II	Richard II	Royal Shakespeare Company; Royal Shakespeare Theatre and The Barbican	
2016	Richard II	Richard II	Royal Shakespeare Company; The Barbican and the Brooklyn Academy of Music	
2017	Don Juan in Soho	Don Juan	Wyndham's Theatre	
2018	The Muppets Take the O2	Tenth Doctor	The O2 Arena	
2022	Good	John Halder	Harold Pinter Theatre	
2023–24	Macbeth	Macbeth	Donmar Warehouse; Harold Pinter Theatre	
2025	Inside No. 9 Stage/Fright	Guest star	Wyndham's Theatre	
2025	An Oak Tree	Guest star	Young Vic Theatre	
2026	White Rabbit Red Rabbit	Performer	Duchess Theatre	

== Audio ==
Year	Title	Role	Notes	Ref.
1993	The Fifty Friends of Simon Goberschmitt	Raymond	BBC Radio 4	
1993	The Strange Case of Dr. Jekyll and Mr. Hyde	Policeman	BBC Radio 4	
1994	Knocking on Heaven's Door	Lindsay Lerner	BBC Radio 4	
1996	Paint Her Well	The Son	BBC Radio 4	
1998	Hemlock and After	Eric Craddock	BBC Radio 4	
1998	The Airmen Who Would Not Die	Captain Raymond "Hinch" Hinchliffe	BBC Radio 4	
1998	The Golden Triangle: The Order of Release	John Everett Millais	BBC Radio 4	
1999	Fire in the Heart	Reader	BBC Radio 4	
2000	Henry VI, Part 1	Henry VI	Arkangel Shakespeare	
2000	Henry VI, Part 2	Henry VI	Arkangel Shakespeare	
2000	Henry VI, Part 3	Henry VI	Arkangel Shakespeare	
2000	The Sea	Willy Carson	BBC Radio 3	
2001	Much Ado about Nothing	Benedick	BBC Radio 4	
2001	Sunday Worship	Himself	BBC Radio 4	
2001	The Long Firm	Narrator	Whole Story Audiobooks	
2001	He Kills Coppers	Narrator	Whole Story Audiobooks	
2001	True Crime	Narrator	Whole Story Audiobooks	
2001	Doctor Who: Colditz	Feldwebel Kurtz	Big Finish	
2001	Dr Finlay: Adventures of a Black Bag	Jackson	BBC Radio 4	
2002	Dr Finlay: Further Adventures of a Black Bag	McKellor	BBC Radio 4	
2002	Double Income, No Kids Yet	Daniel	BBC Radio 4	
2002	Facade	William Walton	BBC Radio 4 drama based on Façade	
2002	The Museum	Brian	BBC Radio 4	
2002	Island	Calum	BBC Radio 4	
2002	Sunburst Finish	Davey	BBC Radio 4	
2002	Love and Friendship	Edward	BBC Radio 4	
2003	Doctor Who: Sympathy for the Devil	Colonel Brimmecombe-Wood	Big Finish	
2003	Doctor Who: Exile	Time Lord No. 2, Pub landlord	Big Finish	
2003	Caesar! – Peeling Figs for Julius	Caligula	BBC Radio 4	
2003	Doctor Who: Scream of the Shalka	Caretaker	BBCi	
2003	The Amazing Maurice and His Educated Rodents	Dangerous Beans	BBC Radio 4	
2003	Pompeii	Narrator	BBC Radio 4	
2003	The Rotters' Club	Bill Trotter	BBC Radio 4	
2003	Mansfield Park	Tom Bertram	BBC Radio 4	
2003	Strangers and Brothers	Donald Howerd	BBC Radio 4	
2003	The Merlin Conspiracy	Narrator	Co-narrated with Emilia Fox	
2003	The Mill on the Floss	Phillip Wakeman, Gypsy	BBC Radio 4	
2003	A Quick Change	Colin	BBC Radio 4	
2003	Tuesdays & Sundays	William Millman	BBC Radio 4	
2004	Dalek Empire III	Galanar	Big Finish	
2004	Doctor Who: Medicinal Purposes	Daft Jamie	Big Finish	
2004	Quite Ugly One Morning	Narrator	Time Warner	
2004	Starter for Ten	Narrator	Hodder & Stoughton	
2004	Whiteout	Narrator	Macmillan Digital Audio	
2004	The Merchant of Venice	Launcelot Gobbo	Arkangel Shakespeare	
2004	Stargazing: Memoirs of a Young Lighthouse Keeper	Narrator	BBC Radio 4	
2004	Richard III	The Archbishop, Ghost of Henry VI	Arkangel Shakespeare	
2004	How to Train Your Dragon	Narrator	Part of the How to Train Your Dragon series	
2004	How to Be a Pirate	Narrator	Part of the How to Train Your Dragon series	
2005	UNIT: The Wasting	Colonel Brimmecombe-Wood	Big Finish	
2005	Dixon of Dock Green	PC Andy Crawford	BBC Radio 4	
2005	The Adventures of Luther Arkwright	Luther Arkwright	Big Finish	
2005	The Beasts of Clawstone Castle	Narrator	Macmillan Digital Audio	
2005	Macbeth	Porter	Arkangel Shakespeare	
2005	King Lear	Edgar	Arkangel Shakespeare	
2005	The Comedy of Errors	Antipholus of Syracuse	Arkangel Shakespeare	
2005	Romeo and Juliet	Mercutio	Arkangel Shakespeare	
2006	The Virgin Radio Christmas Panto	Buttons	Virgin Radio	
2006	Doctor Who: The Stone Rose	Narrator	BBC Audio	
2006	Doctor Who: The Resurrection Casket	Narrator	BBC Audio	
2006	Doctor Who: The Feast of the Drowned	Narrator	BBC Audio	
2006	How to Speak Dragonese	Narrator	Part of the How to Train Your Dragon series	
2007	The Wooden Overcoat	Peter	BBC Radio 4	
2007	How to Cheat a Dragon's Curse	Narrator	Part of the How to Train Your Dragon series	
2008	Doctor Who: Pest Control	Narrator	BBC Audio	
2008	Nebulous	Doctor Beep	BBC Radio 4	
2009	Doctor Who: The Day of the Troll	Narrator	BBC Audio	
2009	How to Twist a Dragon's Tale	Narrator	Part of the How to Train Your Dragon series	
2009	MacB	Narrator	BBC 7	
2010	Of Mice and Men	George Milton	BBC Radio 4	
2010	Murder in Samarkand	Craig Murray	BBC Radio 4	
2010	How to Ride a Dragon's Storm	Narrator	Part of the How to Train Your Dragon series	
2010	Doctor Who: The Last Voyage	Narrator	BBC Audio	
2010	Doctor Who: Dead Air	Narrator	BBC Audio	
2010	Bear Snores On	Narrator	Simon & Schuster Children's Books	
2010	Dogfish	Narrator	Simon & Schuster Children's Books	
2010	How Roald Dahl Shaped Pop	Narrator	BBC Radio 2	
2010	Book at Bedtime – A Night with a Vampire	Narrator	BBC Radio 4	
2010	Hairy Maclary Story Collection	Narrator	Collection of eight stories	
2011	My Sister Lives on the Mantelpiece	Narrator	Orion Books	
2011	Kafka: The Musical	Franz Kafka	BBC Radio 3	
2011	The Gobetweenies	Joe	BBC Radio 4	
2011	Tales of Hans Christian Andersen	Narrator	BBC Learning	
2011	The Purple Land	Richard Lamb	BBC Radio 4	
2011	Life and Fate	Nikolai Krymov	BBC Radio 4	
2011	How to Break a Dragon's Heart	Narrator	Part of the How to Train Your Dragon series	
2011	A Hero's Guide to Deadly Dragons	Narrator	Part of the How to Train Your Dragon series	
2011	Supermarket Zoo	Narrator	Simon & Schuster	
2011	Book at Bedtime – A Night with a Vampire 2	Narrator	BBC Radio 4	
2011	Chitty Chitty Bang Bang series	Narrator		
2011	The Pied Piper of Hamelin	Narrator	BBC Radio 4	
2011	Stevenson in Love	Robert Stevenson	BBC Radio 4	
2012	Love Virtually	Leo	BBC Radio 4	
2012	Book at Bedtime – Stonemouth	Reader	BBC Radio 4	
2012–22	Believe It!	Young Richard Wilson, David Tennant	BBC Radio 4	
2012	Star Wars: The Clone Wars	Huyang		
2012	Romeo and Juliet	Prince Escalus	BBC Radio 3	
2012	Twelfth Night	Malvolio	BBC Radio 3	
2012	Silver: The Return to Treasure Island	Narrator	Whole Story Audiobooks	
2012	How to Steal a Dragon's Sword	Narrator	Part of the How to Train Your Dragon series	
2012	On Her Majesty's Secret Service	Narrator	BBC Audio	
2012	Chitty Chitty Bang Bang	Narrator	Chitty Chitty Bang Bang series	
2012	Waiting for the Boatman	Mario Minniti	BBC Radio 4	
2012	Jack and the Flum Flum Tree	Narrator	Macmillan Digital Audio	
2012	The Rhyming Rabbit	Narrator	Macmillan Digital Audio	
2013	Every Seventh Wave	Leo	BBC Radio 4	
2013	The Great Scott: The Fair Maid of Perth	Walter Scott	BBC Radio 4	
2013	The Great Scott: Rob Roy	Walter Scott	BBC Radio 4	
2013	The Great Scott: Waverley	Walter Scott	BBC Radio 4	
2014	The Great Scott: Redgauntlet	Walter Scott	BBC Radio 4	
2014	The Great Scott: Ivanhoe	Walter Scott	BBC Radio 4	
2014	The Great Scott: The Bride of Lammermoor	Walter Scott	BBC Radio 4	
2014	How to Seize a Dragon's Jewel	Narrator	Part of the How to Train Your Dragon series	
2015	Carmilla	Dr. Martin Hesselius	Amazon Audible	
2015	How to Betray a Dragon's Hero	Narrator	Part of the How to Train Your Dragon series	
2015	The Great Scott: The Heart of Midlothian	Walter Scott	BBC Radio 4	
2015	The Great Scott: The Antiquary	Walter Scott	BBC Radio 4	
2015	The Great Scott: The Talisman	Walter Scott	BBC Radio 4	
2015	Peter and the wolf and jazz!	Narrator	with The Amazing Keystone Big Band	
2016	Doctor Who: Technophobia	Tenth Doctor	Big Finish: The Tenth Doctor Adventures	
2016	Doctor Who: Time Reaver	Tenth Doctor	Big Finish: The Tenth Doctor Adventures	
2016	Doctor Who: Death and the Queen	Tenth Doctor	Big Finish: The Tenth Doctor Adventures	
2016	How to Fight a Dragon's Fury	Narrator	Part of the How to Train Your Dragon series	
2016	Chitty Chitty Bang Bang Over the Moon	Narrator	Chitty Chitty Bang Bang series	
2016	Chitty Chitty Bang Bang and the Race Against Time	Narrator	Chitty Chitty Bang Bang series	
2016	Look Back in Anger	Jimmy Porter	BBC Radio 4. Directed by Richard Wilson. (60th Anniversary production.)	
2016	The Beach of Falesa	Wiltshire	BBC Radio 4	
2016	The Ebb Tide	Narrator	BBC Radio 4	
2016	The Mark of the Gold Light	Noriam	–	
2017	The Wizards of Once	Narrator	The Wizards of Once series by Cressida Cowell	
2017	Doctor Who: Infamy of the Zaross	Tenth Doctor	Big Finish: The Tenth Doctor Adventures	
2017	Doctor Who: Sword of the Chevalier	Tenth Doctor	Big Finish: The Tenth Doctor Adventures	
2017	Doctor Who: Cold Vengeance	Tenth Doctor	Big Finish: The Tenth Doctor Adventures	
2018	Wild Honey	Platanov	BBC Radio 4	
2018	The Wizards of Once: Twice Magic	Narrator	The Wizards of Once series by Cressida Cowell	
2018	Jenny: The Doctor's Daughter: Zero Space	Tenth Doctor	Big Finish: Jenny: The Doctors Daughter	
2019	Doctor Who: No Place	Tenth Doctor	Big Finish: The Tenth Doctor Adventures	
2019	Doctor Who: One Mile Down	Tenth Doctor	Big Finish: The Tenth Doctor Adventures	
2019	Doctor Who: The Creeping Death	Tenth Doctor	Big Finish: The Tenth Doctor Adventures	
2019	Warhammer Adventures: Attack of the Necron	Narrator	Warped Galaxies, Book 1	
2019	Warhammer Adventures: Claws of the Genestealer	Narrator	Warped Galaxies, Book 2	
2019	Warhammer Adventures: Secrets of the Tau	Narrator	Warped Galaxies, Book 3	
2020	Donna Noble: Kidnapped: The Chiswick Cuckoos	Tenth Doctor	Big Finish: Donna Noble: Kidnapped	
2020	Doctor Who: Out of Time	Tenth Doctor	Big Finish: The Tenth Doctor Adventures	
2020	Doctor Who: Expiry Dating	Tenth Doctor	Big Finish: The Tenth Doctor Adventures	
2020	Doctor Who: Precious Annihilation	Tenth Doctor	Big Finish: The Tenth Doctor Adventures	
2020	Doctor Who: Ghosts	Tenth Doctor	Big Finish: The Tenth Doctor Adventures	
2020	The Wizards of Once: Knock Three Times	Narrator	The Wizards of Once series by Cressida Cowell	
2020	Warhammer Adventures: War of the Orks	Narrator	Warped Galaxies, Book 4	
2021	The Diary of River Song: A Brave New World	Tenth Doctor	Big Finish: The Diary of River Song	
2021	Doctor Who: Dalek Universe 1	Tenth Doctor	Big Finish: The Tenth Doctor Adventures	
2021	Doctor Who: The Gates of Hell	Tenth Doctor	Big Finish: The Tenth Doctor Adventures	
2021	Doctor Who: Dalek Universe 2	Tenth Doctor	Big Finish: The Tenth Doctor Adventures	
2021	Doctor Who: Dalek Universe 3	Tenth Doctor	Big Finish: The Tenth Doctor Adventures	
2021	Doctor Who: Echos of Extinction	Tenth Doctor	Time Lord Victorious	
2021	The Wizards of Once: Never and Forever	Narrator	The Wizards of Once series by Cressida Cowell	
2021	Warhammer Adventures: Plague of the Nurglings	Narrator	Warped Galaxies, Book 5	
2021	Warhammer Adventures: Tomb of the Necron	Narrator	Warped Galaxies, Book 6	
2022	Doctor Who: Wink	Tenth Doctor	Big Finish: The Tenth Doctor Adventures	
2022	Doctor Who: Splinters	Tenth Doctor	Big Finish: The Tenth Doctor Adventures	
2022	Doctor Who: The Stuntman	Tenth Doctor	Big Finish: The Tenth Doctor Adventures	
2022	Doctor Who: Quantum of Axos	Tenth Doctor	Big Finish: The Tenth Doctor Adventures	
2022	The War Master: The Last Line	Tenth Doctor	Big Finish: The War Master	
2022	Macbeth	Macbeth	BBC Radio 4	
2022	Acting for Others Presents...	Himself	Acting for Others	
2023	Luther Arkwright: Heart of Empire	Luther Arkwright	Big Finish: Luther Arkwright	
2023	Doctor Who: The Martian Invasion of Planetoid 50	Tenth Doctor	Big Finish: Once and Future	
2023	A Stroke of the Pen	Narrator	Terry Pratchett: The Lost Stories	
2025	Him	Narrator	Audible	
2025	King Lear	Edmund	BBC Radio 4	
2025	How to Train Your Dragon School: Doom of the Darkwing	Narrator		
2026	Doctor Who: The Companion Chronicles: The Legacy of Time	The Doctor	Big Finish	
2027–2029	Doctor Who: The Tenth Doctor Adventures	The Doctor	Big Finish	
2027	Othello	Iago	BBC Radio 4	

== Video games ==
Year	Title	Role	Notes	Ref.
2014	Kinect Sports Rivals	Narrator	Voice	
2015	Lego Dimensions	Tenth Doctor	Archive audio	
2015	Just Cause 3	"General's News Network" Broadcaster	Voice	
2017	Call of Duty: WWII	Drostan Hynd	Voice and likeness	
2021	Doctor Who: The Lonely Assassins	The Tenth Doctor		
2021	Doctor Who: The Edge of Reality	The Tenth Doctor	Voice and likeness	
2021	Ark: Survival Evolved	Sir Edmund Rockwell	Voice	
2021	ARK: Survival Ascended Lost Colony Expansion Pack	Sir Edmund Rockwell	Voice	

== Web ==
Year	Title	Role	Notes	Ref.
2020	The Doctors Say Thank You	Himself		
2020	The Secret of Novice Hame	Tenth Doctor		

== See also ==
- List of awards and nominations received by David Tennant
