= Arksey (surname) =

Arksey is an English surname. Notable people with the surname include:

- Josh Arksey (born 1994), English cricketer
- Neil Arksey (fl. early 21st century), British writer
