= List of awards and nominations received by David Tennant =

David Tennant awards and nominations
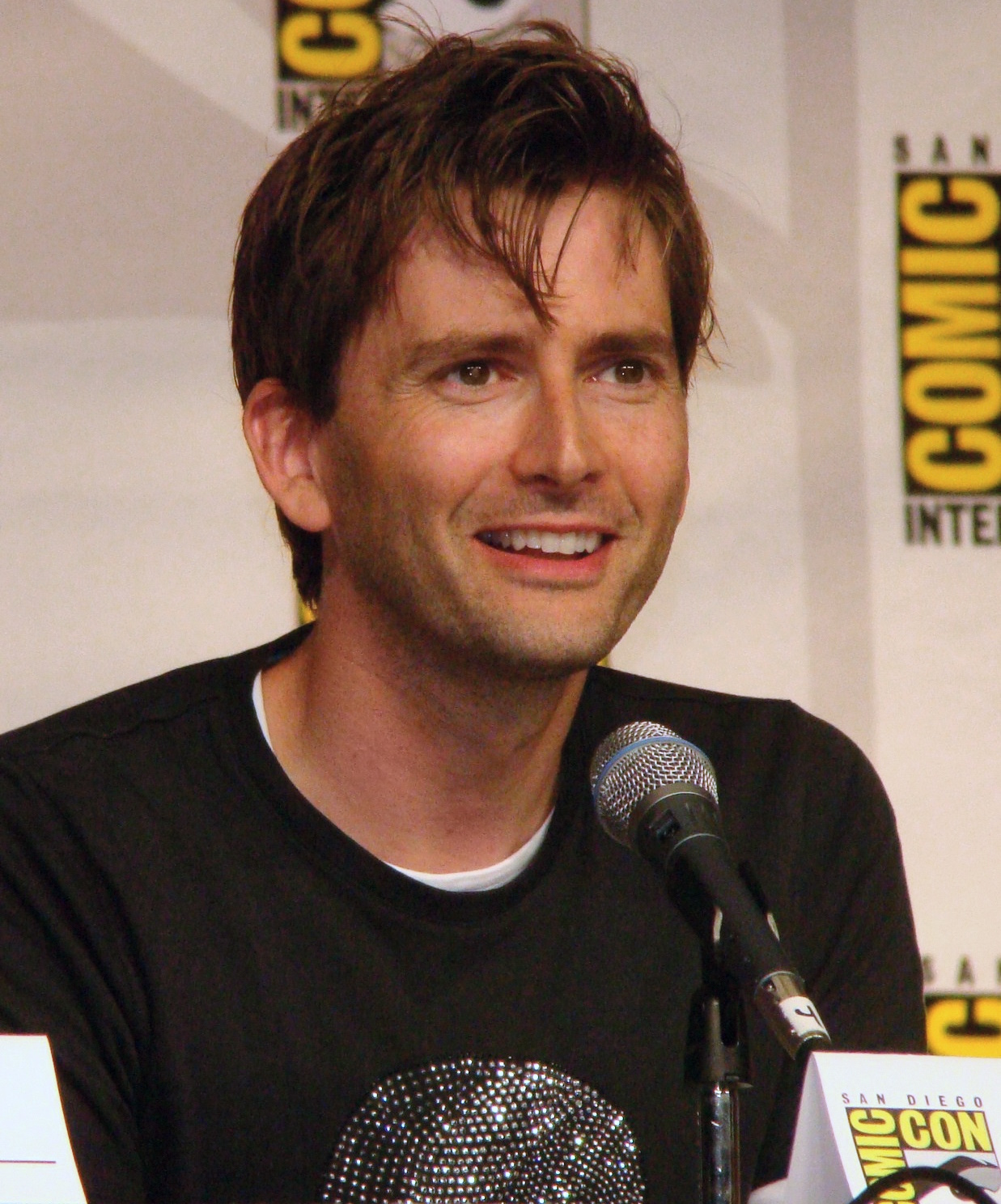
- Tennant in 2009
Awards and nominations
Award	Wins	Nominations
BAFTA Awards	3	10
Emmy Awards	2	2
Laurence Olivier Awards	0	3

Totals (Note: Certain award groups do not simply award one winner. They acknowledge several different recipients, have runners-up, and have third place. Since this is a specific recognition and is different from losing an award, runner-up mentions are considered wins in this award tally. For simplification and to avoid errors, each award in this list has been presumed to have had a prior nomination.)
- Wins: 57
- Nominations: 118

The following is a list of awards and nominations received by Scottish actor David Tennant.

== Major associations ==
=== BAFTA Awards ===
Year	Category	Nominated work	Result	Ref.
BAFTA Cymru
2007	Best Actor	Doctor Who	Won	
BAFTA Scotland
2009	Best Actor in Television	Doctor Who	Nominated	
2014	Best Actor in Television	The Escape Artist	Won	
2015	Best Actor in Film	What We Did on Our Holiday	Nominated	
2021	Audience Award	Des	Nominated	
2024	Actor Television	There She Goes	Won	
2024	Audience Award	Doctor Who	Nominated	
2025	Actor Film / Television	Rivals	Nominated	
British Academy Television Awards
2024	Best Male Comedy Performance	Good Omens	Nominated	
2025	Best Actor	Rivals	Nominated	

=== Emmy Awards ===
Year	Category	Nominated work	Result	Ref.
Daytime Emmy Awards
2013	Outstanding Performer in an Animated Program	Star Wars: The Clone Wars	Won	
International Emmy Awards
2021	Best Performance by an Actor	Des	Won	

=== Laurence Olivier Awards ===
Year	Category	Nominated work	Result	Ref.
2003	Best Actor	Lobby Hero	Nominated	
2023	Best Actor	Good	Nominated	
2024	Best Actor	Macbeth	Nominated	

== Festivals ==
=== Edinburgh International Television Festival ===
Year	Category	Nominated work	Result	Ref.
2021	Best TV Actor – Drama	Des	Nominated	

=== Monte-Carlo Television Festival ===
Year	Category	Nominated work	Result	Ref.
2007	Outstanding Actor – Drama Series	Doctor Who	Nominated	
2013	Outstanding Actor in a Miniseries	Broadchurch	Nominated	

=== Newport Beach Film Festival ===
Year	Category	Nominated work	Result	Ref.
2017	Outstanding Achievement in Filmmaking: Acting	Mad to Be Normal	Won	

=== New York Festivals ===
Year	Category	Nominated work	Result	Ref.
2021	Best Comedy Series – Bronze	Staged	Won	
2021	Best Comedy Episode – Silver	Staged	Won	

=== Rose d'Or ===
Year	Category	Nominated work	Result	Ref.
2021	Best Comedy Programme	Staged	Nominated	

=== Shanghai International TV Festival ===
Year	Category	Nominated work	Result	Ref.
2007	Best Performance by an Actor in a Television Film	Recovery	Nominated	

== Other awards ==
=== Audio Awards ===
==== BBC Audio Drama Awards ====
Year	Category	Nominated work	Result	Ref.
2012	Best Actor	Kafka: The Musical	Won	

==== British Podcast Awards ====
Year	Category	Nominated work	Result	Ref.
2025	Best Host	David Tennant Does a Podcast With…	Nominated	

==== BTVA People’s Choice Voice Acting Awards ====
Year	Category	Nominated work	Result	Ref.
2013	Best Vocal Creation of a New Character (First Time being Animated)	Star Wars: The Clone Wars	Won	
2013	Best Male Vocal Performance in a Television Series in a Supporting Role	Star Wars: The Clone Wars	Won	

==== BTVA Television Voice Acting Awards ====
Year	Category	Nominated work	Result	Ref.
2013	Best Vocal Creation of a New Character (First Time being Animated)	Star Wars: The Clone Wars	Nominated	
2013	Best Male Vocal Performance in a Television Series in a Guest Role	Star Wars: The Clone Wars	Nominated	
2016	Best Male Vocal Performance in a Television Series in a Supporting Role	Teenage Mutant Ninja Turtles	Nominated	
2017	Best Male Vocal Performance in a Television Series in a Supporting Role	Teenage Mutant Ninja Turtles	Nominated	
2018	Best Male Lead Vocal Performance in a Television Series	Ducktales	Nominated	

=== Film Awards ===
==== CinEuphoria Awards ====
Year	Category	Nominated work	Result	Ref.
2020	Best Supporting Actor - International Competition	Mary Queen of Scots	Nominated	

==== IGN Summer Movie Awards ====
Year	Category	Nominated work	Result	Ref.
2015	Best TV Villain	Jessica Jones	Won	

==== International Online Cinema Awards ====
Year	Category	Nominated work	Result	Ref.
2016	Best Supporting Actor in a Drama Series	Jessica Jones	Nominated	

==== National Film Awards ====
Year	Category	Nominated work	Result	Ref.
2020	Best Actor in a TV series	Good Omens	Nominated	
2021	Best Actor in a TV series	Around the World in 80 Days	Nominated	
2025	Best Actor	Rivals	Nominated	

=== Television Awards ===
==== Astra TV Awards ====
Year	Category	Nominated work	Result	Ref.
2024	Best Actor in a Streaming Comedy Series	Good Omens	Nominated	

==== BBC’s "Drama Best Of" ====
Year	Category	Nominated work	Result	Ref.
2005	Best Actor	Doctor Who	Nominated	
2005	Most Desirable Star	Doctor Who	Nominated	
2006	Best Actor	Doctor Who	Won	

Broadcasting Press Guild Awards

Year	Category	Nominated work	Result	Ref.
2006	Best Actor	Doctor Who, Casanova, Secret Smile	Nominated	
2009	Best Actor	Doctor Who, Einstein and Eddington	Nominated	
2010	Best Actor	Doctor Who, Hamlet	Nominated	
2014	Best Actor	Broadchurch	Nominated	
2021	Best Actor	Des, Staged	Won	

==== Constellation Awards ====
Year	Category	Nominated work	Result	Ref.
2007	Best Male Performance in a Science Fiction Television Episode	Doctor Who: The Girl in the Fireplace	Won	
2008	Best Male Performance in a Science Fiction Television Episode	Doctor Who: The Family of Blood	Won	
2009	Best Male Performance in a Science Fiction Television Episode	Doctor Who: Midnight	Nominated	
2010	Best Male Performance in a Science Fiction Television Episode	Doctor Who: The Waters of Mars	Won	
2011	Best Male Performance in a Science Fiction Television Episode	Doctor Who: The End of Time: Part Two	Nominated	

==== Glenfiddich Spirit of Scotland Awards ====
Year	Category	Nominated work	Result	Ref.
2007	Screen		Won	

==== Gold Derby Awards ====
Year	Category	Nominated work	Result	Ref.
2006	TV Movie/Mini Supporting Actor	Blackpool	Nominated	
2014	TV Movie/Mini Lead Actor	Broadchurch	Nominated	
2026	Limited/Movie Actor	Good Omens	Pending	

==== iTalk Telly Awards ====
Year	Category	Nominated work	Result	Ref.
2015	Best Actor in a Drama	Broadchurch	Won	
2017	Best Dramatic Partnership (with Olivia Colman)	Broadchurch	Won	
2020	Best Dramatic Performance	Des	Won	
2020	Best Comedy Partnership (with Michael Sheen)	Staged	Won	
2021	Best Comedy Partnership (with Michael Sheen)	Staged	Won	
2023	Best Dramatic Performance	Litvinenko	Won	
2023	Best Comedy Partnership (with Michael Sheen)	Staged	Won	

==== National Television Awards ====
Year	Category	Nominated work	Result	Ref.
2006	Most Popular Actor	Doctor Who	Won	
2007	Most Popular Actor	Doctor Who	Won	
2008	Outstanding Drama Performance	Doctor Who	Won	
2010	Outstanding Drama Performance	Doctor Who	Won	
2014	TV Detective	Broadchurch	Nominated	
2015	Special Recognition	—N/a	Won	
2016	Drama Performance	Broadchurch	Nominated	
2018	Drama Performance	Broadchurch	Nominated	
2021	Drama Performance	Des	Won	

==== People's Choice Awards ====
Year	Category	Nominated work	Result	Ref.
2015	Favorite Actor in a New TV Series	Gracepoint	Won	
2016	Favorite Sci-fi/Fantasy TV Actor	Jessica Jones	Nominated	

==== Royal Television Society Programme Awards ====
Year	Category	Nominated work	Result	Ref.
2007	Best Actor	Doctor Who, Recovery	Nominated	
2011	Best Actor	Single Father	Nominated	

==== Satellite Awards ====
Year	Category	Nominated work	Result	Ref.
2008	Best Actor - Drama Television Series	Doctor Who	Nominated	

==== Saturn Awards ====
Year	Category	Nominated work	Result	Ref.
2009	Best Actor on Television	Doctor Who: The End of Time	Nominated	
2015	Best Supporting Actor on Television	Jessica Jones	Nominated	
2019	Best Actor in Streaming Presentation	Good Omens	Nominated	

==== Scottish Comedy Awards ====
Year	Category	Nominated work	Result	Ref.
2020	Best Actor	Good Omens	Won	

==== Scream Awards ====
Year	Category	Nominated work	Result	Ref.
2008	Best Science Fiction Actor	Doctor Who	Nominated	

==== SFX Awards ====
Year	Category	Nominated work	Result	Ref.
2007	Best TV Actor	Doctor Who	Won	
2008	Best TV Actor	Doctor Who	Won	
2010	Best TV Actor	Doctor Who	Won	
2011	Best TV Actor	Doctor Who	Nominated	

==== Tell-Tale TV Awards ====
Year	Category	Nominated work	Result	Ref.
2020	Favorite Actor in a Limited Series or TV Movie	Good Omens	Won	
2024	Favorite Performer in a Sci-Fi/ Fantasy/ Horror Series	Good Omens	Runner-up	

==== TV Times Awards ====
Year	Category	Nominated work	Result	Ref.
2020	Favourite Actor	Des	Won	
2025	TV Icon of Today	Self	Pending	

==== TV Quick and TV Choice Awards ====
Year	Category	Nominated work	Result	Ref.
2006	Best Actor	Doctor Who	Won	
2007	Best Actor	Doctor Who	Won	
2008	Best Actor	Doctor Who	Won	
2011	Best Actor	Single Father	Won	
2012	Best Actor	Broadchurch	Won	
2013	Best Actor	Broadchurch	Won	
2015	Best Actor	Broadchurch	Won	
2017	Best Actor	Broadchurch	Won	
2020	Best Actor	Deadwater Fell	Nominated	
2023	Best Actor	Litvinenko	Nominated	

=== Theatre Awards ===
==== British Regional Theatre Awards ====
Year	Category	Nominated work	Result	Ref.
1995	Best Actor	An experienced woman gives advice	Nominated	

==== BroadwayWorld UK Awards ====
The UK / West End BroadwayWorld Awards are awarded each year, based on online voting on the BroadwayWorld website.

Year	Category	Nominated work	Result	Ref.
2011	Best Actor	Much Ado About Nothing	Won	

==== Critics' Awards for Theatre in Scotland ====
Year	Category	Nominated work	Result	Ref.
2005	Best Male Performance	Look Back in Anger	Won	

==== Critics' Circle Theatre Awards ====
Year	Category	Nominated work	Result	Ref.
2009	Best Shakespearean Performance	Hamlet	Won	
2024	Best Shakespearean Performance	Macbeth	Won	

==== Evening Standard Theatre Awards ====
Year	Category	Nominated work	Result	Ref.
2009	Best Actor	Hamlet	Nominated	

==== Ian Charleson Awards ====
Year	Category	Nominated work	Result	Ref.
2000	Best Classical Actor Under 30	The Comedy of Errors	Nominated	

==== Manchester Evening News Theatre Awards ====
Year	Category	Nominated work	Result	Ref.
1995	Best Actor	An Experienced Woman Gives Advice	Nominated	

==== Stalls to Stage Awards ====
Year	Category	Nominated work	Result	Ref.
2026	Screen Stars on Stage	Macbeth	Nominated	

==== Theatregoers' Choice Awards ====
Year	Category	Nominated work	Result	Ref.
2009	AKA Theatre Event of the Year	Hamlet	Won	

==== Theatre Management Association ====
Year	Category	Nominated work	Result	Ref.
1996	Best Actor	The Glass Menagerie	Nominated	

==== WhatsOnStage Awards ====
Year	Category	Nominated work	Result	Ref.
2012	Best Actor in a Play	Much Ado About Nothing	Nominated	
2015	Best Actor in a Play	Richard II	Won	
2018	Best Actor in a Play	Don Juan in Soho	Won	
2023	Best Performer in a Play	Good	Nominated	
2024	Best Performer in a Play	Macbeth	Won	

=== Others ===
==== British LGBT Awards ====
Year	Category	Result	Ref.
2024	Celebrity Ally	Won	

==== Crime Thriller Awards ====
Year	Category	Nominated work	Result	Ref.
2013	Best Actor Dagger	Broadchurch	Won	

==== Fright Meter Awards ====
Year	Category	Nominated work	Result	Ref.
2011	Best Supporting Actor	Fright Night	Nominated	
