= AICR =

AICR may refer to:

- American Institute for Cancer Research, an American-based organization
- Association for International Cancer Research, a British-based organization
