= The Resurrection Casket =

2006 novel by Justin Richards

- Author: Justin Richards
- Series: Doctor Who book: New Series Adventures
- Release number: 9
- Subject: Featuring: Tenth Doctor; Rose
- Set in: Period between "New Earth" and "School Reunion"
- Publisher: BBC Books
- Publication date: 13 April 2006
- ISBN: 0-563-48642-2
- Preceded by: The Feast of the Drowned
- Followed by: I am a Dalek

The Resurrection Casket is a BBC Books original novel written by Justin Richards and based on the long-running British science fiction television series Doctor Who. It was published on 13 April 2006 alongside The Stone Rose and The Feast of the Drowned. It features the Tenth Doctor and Rose.

== Synopsis ==
On a shadowy planet called Starfall, where no modern technology works, the Doctor and Rose become involved in a quest for a lost treasure that belonged to Hamlek Glint — the Resurrection Casket, supposedly the key to eternal life. But the TARDIS has stopped working too...

== Plot ==
The TARDIS is forced to land after being affected by an effect similar to an EMP (Electromagnetic Pulse). Outside the Doctor and Rose find a normal looking town. The Doctor informs Rose that they cannot re-enter the TARDIS until she can repair her systems. They then set off to find out what is producing the constant pulses and stop it. At the docks are steam powered spaceships. They go to the pub to get more information.

The bartender is a young girl with half of her body replaced by steam-powered robotics. A boy of about ten talking to her, and when the Doctor introduces himself and Rose, the girl gives her name as Silver Sally and the boy's name as Jimm. Jimm and Sally tell them about the zeg. It is a zone of electromagnetic gravitation that interferes with anything containing an electronic circuit. It goes as far as the Outreaches, where a lot of ships get stuck. People still come because they hope to find Hamlek Glint's lost treasure. The planet itself is owned by Drel McCavity, who is a collector of Hamlek Glint artifacts. Jimm's uncle is the biggest collector though.

Jimm's uncle arrives and invites the Doctor and Rose to come visit and hear about Hamlek Glint (the pirate).

The Doctor and Rose return to the docks to see about getting passage off planet for themselves and the TARDIS, but have no luck. While they are there, a body is found. The Doctor uses his psychic paper to pass himself off as an investigator, and begins to ask questions about the body. It is a man they had seen at the pub, who has a small bit of folded paper with a smudge of ink that looks vaguely like a figure. The Doctor says it's what space sailors call a Black Shadow.

The Doctor says that the man was a friend of Drel McCavity, and that someone should tell him, and then volunteers to do it. He asks Rose to track down the man's friends and warn them. At McCavity's there is a gallery full of display cases of Hamlek Glint artifacts. McCavity shows him many of them, then sees the Doctor out, giving him a business card with an invitation to make an appointment later.

Rose locates Edd and Bonny, and learns that they recently sold McCavity some fake Glint artifacts, even though they'd had genuine stuff ten years ago. As she is talking to them, she suddenly realizes they are not alone. A huge shaggy shape with red eyes apologizes, then kills both Edd and Bonny.

The Doctor goes to Bobb's home. It is filled with Glint artifacts, including a photo of the crew, who were all robots except for Glint himself, and the cabin boy Robbie. Bobb says that no one knows what happened to Robbie, but that the robots were all sold for scrap. Glint set sail for Starfall, and was never seen again.

Rose arrives, and is given a tour of Bobb's collection. Part of it is a replica of Glint's Lost Treasure. The Resurrection Casket is supposed to be his greatest find, able to heal hurts, and bring the dead back to life. The Doctor takes Rose over to the photograph, and asks what she thinks of the shadow in the background. She says it looks like the monster that attacked Edd and Bonny. The doorbell rings again, and Jimm runs off to answer it. The Doctor starts digging in his pockets for paper and finds a folded slip that shows the Black Shadow when unfolded. They hear Jimm scream and the monster from earlier goes after the Doctor.

The Doctor runs toward Bobb's exhibition area. After a lot of dodging around, the monster catches him. The Doctor asks how he knows who he's supposed to kill, and the monster replies that he gets a name and description, along with knowing where the parchment is. The Doctor says that he doesn't have a name, so the monster has the wrong person. Confused, Kevin (the monster) lets him go.

They all talk after Kevin leaves, and decide that he is forced to do what someone wishes because that person knows how to use an object that belonged to Glint. The Doctor says the next step is to find Glint's ship, and that he knows how to do it. They just need someone to fund it, and Drel McCavity is probably the person to ask.

After some discussion and questions, McCavity agrees, but says that he is coming along. The Doctor says he needs some equipment that is 'locked up safely in a big blue box.' Rose and the Doctor stop at the pub, and Silver Sally says she can find them a robot crew, and she wants to come along. Jimm is very upset when he is told that he cannot come.

The TARDIS is loaded into the ship's forward escape pod. McCavity brings a bodyguard named Dugg and a wooden chest. The other crew is made up of three robots - Kenny, King, and Jonesy. After sailing for three days, the Doctor gets impatient waiting for the TARDIS to open, and fixes the ship's engines to hurry things along. The TARDIS finally opens, but isn't ready to leave yet. However, the Doctor is able to use it to figure out where Glint's ship is.

Rose visits Sally and overhears her talking to one of the robots. Rose is horrified to realize that Sally is actually a robot, and that she and the other three are all surviving members of Glint's crew. She hears footsteps, and hurries to hide in a cupboard. She gets out, opens the door further down, and sees Jimm curled into a small ball. Sally comes out, and Rose tries to be casual as she leaves, and then runs down to tell the Doctor. He tells Dugg to barricade the door. Sally threatens them from the other side, and gives them a few minutes to decide what to do. The Doctor creates a diversion quickly, and they let Sally and the other robots come in with Jimm.

The Doctor's diversion starts to work, and he makes up a story about what it is, saying that he'll fix it, just put everyone else into the escape pod, with the clamps locked. While they are in the pod waiting for the Doctor, Jimm wakes up. Then they hear the clamps release and the door open, and the Doctor comes in. He gets the controls working, and then realizes that the TARDIS is in the other escape pod.

They navigate the escape pod to the zeg, find Glint's ship, dock, and go on board. McCavity has Dugg bring his wooden chest. They find the treasure room, and go inside. It is empty, except for a large polished black casket the size and shape of a coffin with pipes and wires laid into the lid. It's the Resurrection Casket, and the Doctor tells them not to open it.

As they are discussing the fact that the treasure is gone, a voice comes from the doorway. It's Kevin, who tells them that he lives here, and they all realize that McCavity is the one who 'employs' him, by using the medallion he's wearing, then they hear a loud clang and realize the ship is docking.

With Kevin's help, they decide to move to the games room. They bring the Resurrection Casket with them, to keep it from falling into the robots' hands. Dugg tries to lift it, but he needs help, so Kevin takes it. They use the snooker table to block the door, and then pile other items on top, including the Resurrection Casket and McCavity's chest.

Just as they finish, the door shudders, and the robots are on the other side. Everyone is talking about opening the Casket, and the Doctor keeps telling them no, that it doesn't do what they think it does. McCavity insists that it can bring people back from the dead, and as they argue, the door knocks his chest to the floor, where it bursts open. Out spills a skeleton and the remains of a red dress. McCavity had killed his wife out of jealousy, and wants to use the Resurrection Casket to bring her back.

McCavity has a marked piece of parchment in his hand, and threatens to give it to Rose or Jimm, so that the Doctor will use the Casket, but ends up sneaking it to the Doctor instead. Just as the robots break into the room, the Doctor starts running from Kevin, but Kevin hides behind the sofa.

Rose yells at Dugg to take the Casket out, while she and Jimm try to delay the robots. Dugg is looking for a place to hide the casket, so he can go back and help Rose and Jimm, when Kevin takes it from him. Dugg goes back and takes over the defense, telling Rose and Jimm to run.

McCavity attacks the Doctor with a sword, but the Doctor avoids him and ends up in the main engine room. McCavity catches up, and the Doctor grabs an axe to defend himself. McCavity is interrupted by Kevin, who says this is his job. Rose and Jimm catch up, and McCavity is convinced to call Kevin off.

The Doctor has each of them sealed into an engineering locker, and Kevin takes them outside the ship to the secondary control room. The Doctor has them turn everything back on that was shut down when the ship entered the zeg, and then they go back to their own ship. They leave a Black Shadow parchment behind, and the Doctor tricks one of the robots into picking it up.

The steam powered ship starts to move, dragging Glint's ship deeper into the zeg with it. The Doctor directs everyone to the forward escape pod, and the systems on the pirate ship start to explode. As it comes apart, McCavity again demands that the Resurrection Casket be opened, and when the Doctor refuses, sets Kevin on him again.

While the Doctor and Kevin dodge each other around the TARDIS, Sally appears in the airlock. Rose opens the inner airlock door and lets her in. The Doctor shakes hands with Jimm, then with Kevin, and then Jimm launches himself at McCavity, taking the medallion in the process. The Doctor uses his psychic paper to make McCavity think he still has the Black Shadow, and then Kevin goes after McCavity, who now has the Black Shadow in his pocket. McCavity opens the Resurrection Casket, and it is empty. As Kevin reaches for him, he falls into it and the lid closes.

Over by the airlock door, Sally has Rose by the throat. Rose tricks her and escapes, and then the Doctor holds her captive with the sonic screwdriver. The Doctor explains that Uncle Bobb was Robbie the cabin boy, Jimm is Hamlek Glint, and the model of the Lost Treasure is actually the real thing.

They put Sally in an escape pod, but she tries to catch them and manages to get herself killed. Jimm gives Kevin the medallion, which sets him free. They open the Resurrection Casket, and find a baby Drel McCavity. Uncle Bobb finds Jimm before he gets back to Starfall, and the Doctor and Rose leave in the TARDIS before the zeg can cause problems for them again.

== Continuity ==
- The Doctor mentions that something might be the origin of the genie myth, but he doesn't know for sure. This places the story before the book The Stone Rose, where the origin of the genie myth is discovered.
- Kronkburgers (from "The Long Game") and a banana (from "The Doctor Dances" and "The Girl in the Fireplace") make an appearance.
- The 'fighting hand' reference is to "The Christmas Invasion".

== References to popular culture ==
- Elvis (who is also mentioned in "The Christmas Invasion", "The Idiot's Lantern" and "42") is the name of one of the robots.
- The story is a loose science fiction adaptation of Robert Louis Stevenson's 1883 novel Treasure Island, with the Doctor taking the role of Dr Livesey, and Rose sharing the Jim Hawkins part with a young boy named Jimm.

== Audio book ==
An abridged audio book version of The Resurrection Casket read by David Tennant was released in July 2006 by BBC Audiobooks (ISBN 1-84607-061-9.) Also included was an interview with the author by David Darlington.

A promotional version, released without music and in a paper sleeve, was included free in the Radio Times (April 22–29, 2008).

== See also ==
- Whoniverse
