= Archie McLeod =

Scottish footballer (1908–1990)

Archibald McAlo McLeod (15 May 1908 – 14 November 1990) was a Scottish footballer who played in the forward position.

== Career ==
McLeod signed for Partick Thistle from Parkhead Juniors (where he had been capped for the Scotland Juniors team) in August 1933. He was mainly a backup at Firhill, making three appearances in the 1933–34 Scottish First Division (scoring twice against Clyde), plus matches for the reserves in the Scottish Football Alliance before leaving for Northern Ireland to further his career, joining Derry City. In the 1934–35 Irish League season, he was the top goalscorer for Derry, netting 57 times, a record that still stands today. That season, he also helped the team to their first trophy with a Dunville Cup triumph, which they repeated in 1937.

An injury ended his football career in 1938 and he returned home to Glasgow where he worked as a machinist with John Brown & Company shipbuilders.

== Personal life ==
McLeod was the grandson of cotters from the Isle of Mull who moved south to Glasgow due to the Highland Clearances. While playing for Derry City, he married Nellie Blair, daughter of a prominent local Protestant family, in 1938, and had a daughter Helen before moving back to Scotland. Helen (died in 2007) was married to retired Church of Scotland minister and former Moderator Alexander "Sandy" McDonald (1937–2016) and they had three children, the youngest of whom is actor David Tennant.
