= Alan Main (minister) =

Scottish minister (1936–2023)

Alan Main (31 March 1936 – 1 December 2023) was a minister of the Church of Scotland who served as Moderator of the General Assembly from May 1998 until May 1999.

== Biography ==
Main was born in Aberdeen on 31 March 1936. He was educated at Robert Gordon's College then studied divinity at Aberdeen University from 1954. In 1960 he travelled to the US to study at the Union Theological Seminary in New York.

He was ordained in 1963 and served as minister at Chapel of Garioch Parish Church, Aberdeenshire, 1963–1970 and was then appointed as chaplain to the University of Aberdeen.

Main was professor of practical theology at the University of Aberdeen, 1980–2001, and was also master of Christ's College, Aberdeen, 1992–2001. He has served as minister in Colombo, Sri Lanka.

He was elected Moderator of the General Assembly of the Church of Scotland for the year 1998/1999. His formal title (following the end of his Moderatorial year) is the Very Reverend Professor Alan Main. He was succeeded in the role, in May 1999, by John Cairns.

From 2000 to 2013, Main was patron of the Seven Incorporated Trades of Aberdeen.

He was president of the Boys' Brigade 2006–2007.

Main died at the Woodlands Care Home in Aberdeen, on 1 December 2023, at the age of 87. He was survived by his wife Anne, and his daughter, Katherine. He was also a grandfather and great-grandfather. His funeral was held at Tarves Parish Church on 12 December. A small plaque inside Barthol Chapel Church commemorates his time as Moderator of the Church of Scotland.

== See also ==
- List of moderators of the General Assembly of the Church of Scotland

Religious titles
Preceded by Alexander McDonald	Moderator of the General Assembly of the Church of Scotland; 1998–1999	Succeeded by John B. Cairns
