= The Feast of the Drowned =

2006 novel by Stephen Cole

- Author: Stephen Cole
- Series: Doctor Who book: New Series Adventures
- Release number: 8
- Subject: Featuring: Tenth Doctor; Rose, Mickey
- Set in: Period between "New Earth" and "School Reunion"
- Publisher: BBC Books
- Publication date: 13 April 2006
- Pages: 256
- ISBN: 0-563-48644-9
- Preceded by: The Stone Rose
- Followed by: The Resurrection Casket

The Feast of the Drowned is a BBC Books original novel written by Stephen Cole and based on the long-running British science fiction television series Doctor Who. It was published on 13 April 2006, alongside The Stone Rose and The Resurrection Casket. It features the Tenth Doctor, Rose and Mickey.

== Synopsis ==
When a naval cruiser sinks in mysterious circumstances in the North Sea all aboard are lost. Rose is saddened to learn that the brother of her friend, Keisha, is among the dead. And yet he appears to them as a ghostly apparition, begging to be saved from the coming feast of the drowned.

== Plot ==
Rose is comforting her friend Keisha, whose brother Jay is missing in action after the sinking of HMS Ascendant, a Type 23 frigate, which has just been towed up the Thames in pieces. Rose drags the Doctor along, and he asks what Jay did on the ship, before deciding to go out for chips (and a newspaper to wrap them in). After he leaves, Jay's soaked and shivering ghost appears to Keisha and Rose. He talks to Keisha first, telling her to come to him before the feast, and asks Rose to come too. Then he melts away into a puddle, which also disappears. The Doctor returns, and tells them about people fainting in the newsagent's.

The Doctor and Rose discuss what she saw, and the Doctor says they should go to Mickey's and see what they can find on the Internet. Mickey has already done the research, and gives them his printouts. They find that the ship has been brought to Stanchion House, and that people are going missing near the part of the Thames where it is located.

When the three of them arrive near the building, they see many guards, and an elderly woman trying to climb over the bridge rail. Her name is Anne, and she says she is trying to get to Peter 'before the feast'. The Doctor and Rose manage to get her off the bridge. Mickey and the soldiers who come running all collapse. The Doctor swipes a pass from one of the soldiers, and tells Rose and Mickey to stay with Anne and not to let her out of their sight.

As Rose and Mickey try to decide where to take Anne, they are approached by an old man in full naval uniform wearing dark glasses and a scarf around his neck, who introduces himself as Rear Admiral John Crayshaw. He allows them to take Anne with them, but tells the soldiers to send the ambulance away when it arrives.

Meanwhile, the Doctor goes to Stanchion House, and introduces himself as 'Sir John Smith, Scientific Advisor to the Admiralty' with his psychic paper. He glances quickly at the visitor's book, and says that he has come to see V. Swann. The lift operator brings him to the correct floor, and watches until he goes in. He talks to Vida Swann for a minute before she mentions that her PC had told her Sergeant Jodie North had come in, and that she had alerted security when she saw him instead.

The Doctor runs out of her office, and realizes there were soldiers coming up the stairs and the lift, and no time to get out a window, so he hides in a cupboard until the soldiers pass, then slips into the lift before the doors close. He uses a sonic screwdriver to open the hidden controls, and goes to the lowest level. The doors open into an underground hangar.

The Doctor is noticed by a scientist named Huntley, and after looking at a section of the ship, the Doctor says that it was sliced up using hydrogen fused anti-cellularisation. Alarms start to go off, soldiers come down the lift, and the Doctor takes off for a room labelled 'Decontamination.' He runs through it into a damp, dirty and dingily lit access corridor. After closing the doors behind him, he notices the salty reek to the air. As he moves down the corridor, he sticks his finger in a mucky puddle and decides it is saltwater.

The corridor opens into a large, dark, circular chamber with a very high ceiling and a huge filthy pool in the centre of the floor. There is a ladder on one side, and the air smells of sea water. The Doctor takes a polythene bag from his pocket and fills it with water from the pool, and then starts to climb the ladder as he hears the doors opening behind him.

The ladder is damp, as if someone sopping wet had climbed up it ahead of him, and didn't dry before reaching the top. There is a barrier across the top of the chamber, but the Doctor uses his sonic screwdriver to open the inspection hatch, which has blood on it. The Doctor climbs through with bullets flying around him, and finds himself looking into another enormous access tunnel.

As the Doctor splashes through the freezing salty water in the access tunnel, he comes upon another figure. When it turns, the Doctor sees a young man with bloody welts on his face and neck, and eyes like huge pearls. He tells the Doctor that he doesn't want to hurt his little Keisha, but he can't help it. The Doctor realizes this must be Jay, just as the water gets even deeper and starts churning. Out of the water appears a pirate and a U-boat captain, who sweeps Jay back the way he'd come and vanishes. The Doctor decides he can't do anything to help Jay right now, and continues down the tunnel. He ends up on a tugboat, its windows covered by tarpaulin.

At Keisha's, the three of them are talking, and Rose realizes that just before Jay appeared, people had collapsed at the newsagent's, and when Anne's son appeared, the soldiers went down. Rose decides to go down to the newsagent's and see what she can find out. She buys a couple of papers, and the woman behind the counter collapses as Jay appears again.

Jay also appears to Keisha, and Anne's son to her. Mickey tries to stop Anne leaving and isn't able to, but does manage to lock Keisha in the bathroom. Rose runs back and tells her to go after Anne. She heads for the river.

On the tugboat, the Doctor and Vida meet again. While they talk, the Doctor starts pushing buttons and levers, and gets the boat moving, just as soldiers start firing on it. The Doctor tells her that Crayshaw probably wants to kill them both, as she said she'd been a thorn in his side.

When Rose gets to the river, there are people trying to jump in, soldiers trying to stop them, and other people watching. As Rose stands there, a tug appears, headed for a restaurant barge, and Rose sees the Doctor climbing around the prow, trying to uncover the windows. She yells at him, and he waves back and tells her to get everyone off the barge. As the tug crashes into the barge, the Doctor and Vida leap off.

The three of them go to the European Office of Oceanic Research and Development, where Vida works. The Doctor asks Vida to show him the 'biggest and shiniest lab' she has. Vida says that she hasn't been able to contact her boss all day, and there is a Vice Admiral Kelper from Norfolk due to arrive the next day. The Doctor tells Rose to have Mickey come over and bring Keisha.

Vida talks about her work studying ocean currents, what is in them and how they move around, using tracers they had developed. The Doctor is busy being all 'boy-with-a-train-set' with the water he brought. Vida says they were studying water taken from the area where the Ascendant sank, and found no sign of tracers, but there were salts and proteins unlike anything previously discovered.

The Doctor asks Mickey and Vida to go through the naval personnel records and see if the crew of the Ascendant had anything in common. He takes blood samples from Rose, Keisha, and Vida, and finds that Rose and Keisha have alien matter in their blood, and specks in their eyes.

While going through the computer files, Mickey looks up Commodore Powers (Crayshaw's boss), and discovers that he was on a ship that sank in the North Sea three years ago. Then they find that a John Anthony Crayshaw sank in the North Sea in 1759. They run to tell the Doctor.

The Doctor is still working with the water when he realizes the beaker he is analysing is empty, and the sink is full. He smells seawater, and then the water in the sink jumps out and attacks him, covering his face, but he manages to escape.

Rose is in the hallway with Keisha when Mickey and Vida come up, and then suddenly it fills with water. Three figures appear in it – a pirate, U-boat captain, and a Victorian lady. They grab Vida and carry her away. Rose chases after, grabbing onto the back of a police van. When the van stops, Rose finds herself near the river. While trying to help someone else, she falls into the water and is taken by the water creatures.

The Doctor, Mickey, and Keisha drive around for hours, but cannot find either Rose or Vida. They go back to the estate, and Mickey walks Keisha to her door while the Doctor waits in the car. They see a dripping wet Rose ghost, and when the Doctor comes upstairs, he says that he has seen her too, although not as clearly. Jackie (Rose's mum) also sees the image, and is furious with the Doctor. He leaves Keisha with her, while he and Mickey go to get into Stanchion House.

Vida awakes to find herself in the Ascendant's storeroom. Crayshaw is there, and tells her that they are 'of the waterhive.' The room is full of people who have recently been taken. Crayshaw explains that they are acclimatising, and only after many years can they be on both land and water. They need Vida to capture Kelper, so they can spread all over the world.

Mickey and the Doctor go to the Aldgate tube station, to reach a conduit full of phone lines, which passes within a few inches of the decontamination chamber. Mickey asks how he plans to get through the wall, and the Doctor says 'I'm getting quite good at resonating concrete.' He tells Mickey that the tunnel is probably one of the safest places to be, as there aren't many people around to filch water from, so no image of Rose to haunt them. 'I don't want to see her like that again. Do you?'

Rose is moving around underwater, and thinking of her family and the Doctor. Huntley finds Rose, and takes her to where a few of the Ascendant crew are together, including Jay. He tells her that she can't think of her loved ones, because it is what will make them like her. She thinks of the TARDIS instead, and that helps. Huntley tells her that some people have been able to see through their images, and control them somewhat, and encourages her to try.

Crayshaw takes Vida to an empty Stanchion House in the morning, to arrange a meeting with Kelper, but he is already there. Vida tries to escape with him, but the water prevents it, and they are taken into the lift. When they reach the basement, they find all the rest of the staff. The decontamination doors open, and filthy water comes flooding in.

There is a sudden explosion, and part of the wall tumbles in, revealing Mickey and the Doctor. Vida, Kelper, and a couple of other people manage to climb out before the water traps everyone else. Kelper leaves to talk to the military, saying 'We're going to need Torchwood.' As the Doctor, Mickey and Vida talk about what to do next, the Rose image appears to the Doctor and starts to drain water from Mickey and Vida. Rose herself is able to stop it though, and tell the Doctor to stop the aliens. The Doctor says that she was able to hijack the apparition.

The Doctor realizes that the filaments that Vida has been working with disrupt communication in the hive, and this might be a way to defeat them. He sends Mickey and Vida to find the crates that were on the Ascendant and dump them into the river, while he creates a distraction. At the same time, Rose, Jay, Huntley and the others start making their way toward the surface. Vida and Mickey are almost caught by the water, but Rose and the rest interfere, and then help them to release the filaments.

As they are released, Rose thinks of the Doctor, and is able to see him and tell him that they have done it. He says, 'Of course you did it,' and activates the tracers. The water in the Thames thickens and changes, and all the people who had been taken are pushed to the surface, restored to normal.

== Continuity ==
- This book might take place after "Tooth and Claw". The Doctor tells Rose that humans are "big bags of water" and Rose replies by saying "I remember you saying something like that." In "Tooth and Claw", he tells her "You're 70% water and can still drown" (in response to using the moonlight to stop the werewolf).
- When Rose asks the Doctor if they can try to find out what happened with the Ascendant, he agrees, and she replies "I never knew – my wish really is your command" which echoes a line in "Father's Day", where the Doctor says "Your wish is my command."
- The Doctor is now able to resonate concrete (several times), even though he seemed to have trouble with it in "The Doctor Dances".
- The Doctor says "Ace-a-mundo – a word I shall hopefully never use again," which is similar to his line "Correct-a-mundo – a word I have never used before and, hopefully, never will again" in "School Reunion".
- At the start of chapter fifteen, Kelper says "We're going to need Torchwood," referring to the Torchwood story arc.
- The Doctor uses his alias 'John Smith'.
- There are references to the events of the episode "Aliens of London" – specifically, Rose's "disappearance". This book explores what happened during that time.

== Audio book ==
An abridged audio book version of The Feast of the Drowned, read by David Tennant, was released in July 2006 by BBC Audiobooks. Also included was an interview with the author by David Darlington.

The audio book version was given away free in two parts with two consecutive issues of Radio Times in December 2006 and January 2007. These versions omitted the interview.

== See also ==
- Whoniverse
