= Sandy McDonald =

Scottish minister (1937–2016)

The Very Reverend Sandy McDonald
- Moderator of the General Assembly
- Church: Church of Scotland
- In office: 1997 to 1998
- Predecessor: John McIndoe
- Successor: Alan Main

Personal details
- Born: 5 November 1937 Bishopbriggs, Scotland
- Died: 17 March 2016 (aged 78) Erskine, Scotland
- Denomination: Presbyterianism
- Children: 3, including David Tennant
- Education: University of Glasgow; Trinity College, Glasgow

Alexander McDonald (5 November 1937 – 17 March 2016) was a Scottish minister of the Church of Scotland who served as the Moderator of the General Assembly of the Church of Scotland from 1997 to 1998.

== Biography ==
McDonald was born in Bishopbriggs in 1937, the son of Jessie (known as Jeanette) Helen Low and Alexander M. McDonald. He worked in the timber industry in the 1950s, prior to National Service in the Royal Air Force. He studied at the University of Glasgow before training for the ministry at Trinity College.

Following theological studies in the 1960s, his first position after completing his studies was in the rural Church of Scotland, in Longriggend, north Lanarkshire, he served as minister at St David's Parish Church, Bathgate (1968–1974), then at St Mark's Parish Church, Ralston (1974–1988) and then as General Secretary of the Church of Scotland's Board of Ministry until he retired in 2002. He was Moderator of the General Assembly of the Church of Scotland from 1997 to 1998. His formal title (following the end of his Moderatorial year) was The Very Reverend Dr. Alexander McDonald.

=== Television career ===
In the early 1980s, he co-presented the Scottish Television religious magazine programme That's the Spirit! and was also interviewed on VIP, also an STV religious show. His role as Moderator of the General Assembly of the Church of Scotland meant he was one of the public figures who led tributes to Diana, Princess of Wales upon her death in 1997 in a BBC broadcast. In May 2008, he made a non-speaking cameo appearance in the Doctor Who episode "The Unicorn and the Wasp", playing the part of a footman alongside his son David Tennant. They also appeared together on an episode of celebrity Ready Steady Cook. He was one of the interviewees for his son's Special Recognition Award at the National Television Awards in 2015, during which Tennant dedicated his award to his father.

== Personal life ==
McDonald was married to Helen (daughter of former footballer Archie McLeod) for over 40 years until her death on 15 July 2007. They had three children: a daughter named Karen, and two sons, Blair and David.

In a 2015 interview, he disclosed that he was terminally ill with pulmonary fibrosis, a degenerative lung condition. In the same interview, he spoke in support of "right to die" campaigns. McDonald died on 17 March 2016.

Religious titles
Preceded by John H. McIndoe	Moderator of the General Assembly of the Church of Scotland; 1997–1998	Succeeded by Prof. Alan Main
