= John Ballantyne Cairns =

Scottish minister

The Very Reverend John Cairns GCVO KHC
- Moderator of the General Assembly
- Church: Church of Scotland
- In office: 1999 to 2000
- Predecessor: Alan Main
- Successor: Andrew McLellan
- Other post: Dean of the Chapel Royal in Scotland (2006–2013)

Orders
- Ordination: 1974

Personal details
- Born: John Ballantyne Cairns; 1942 (age 83–84)
- Denomination: Presbyterianism

John Ballantyne Cairns (born 1942) is a retired minister of the Church of Scotland.

== Biography ==
Following a career as a solicitor, he studied theology and was ordained in 1974. His first charge was as minister at the parishes of Langholm, Ewes and Westerkirk. He then became minister at Riverside Parish Church, Dumbarton (1985-2001). He then served as minister of Aberlady and Gullane Parish Churches, East Lothian, until retiring in 2008. In retirement, he is serving (as of 2011) as part-time locum minister at St Columba's Church, London. His formal title (following the end of his Moderatorial year) is the Very Reverend Dr John Cairns.

He was Moderator of the General Assembly of the Church of Scotland in 1999-2000 and was appointed Chaplain to the Queen in 1997. He became Dean of the Chapel Royal in Scotland in 2006. He has also held convenerships of several General Assembly boards and committees.

The General Assembly over which he moderated was uniquely held in the Edinburgh International Conference Centre. This was to allow the Scottish Parliament to meet in the Church's Assembly Hall.

Upon the death of James Harkness in August 2026 (Moderator in 1995), Cairns is the surviving Moderator whose time in office was the earliest.

== Honours ==
On 15 January 2013, Cairns was appointed Commander of the Order of St John (CStJ). On 12 July 2013, he was appointed Knight Commander of the Royal Victorian Order (KCVO). As a clergyman, he does not use the tile sir. He was promoted to Knight of Justice of the Order of St John (GCStJ) in January 2018.

In 2004, he was awarded an honorary Doctor of Laws (LLD) degree.

Honour Ribbons:

- : Knight Grand Cross of the Royal Victorian Order (GCVO)
- : Knight of the Order of St. John (KStJ)

== See also ==
- List of moderators of the General Assembly of the Church of Scotland

Religious titles
Preceded by Alan Main	Moderator of the General Assembly of the Church of Scotland; 1999–2000	Succeeded by Andrew McLellan
