= John McIndoe (minister) =

Church of Scotland minister (1934–2022)

John Hedley McIndoe (31 August 1934 – 15 January 2022) was a minister of the Church of Scotland. He was Moderator of the General Assembly of the Church of Scotland in 1996.

== Background and career ==
McIndoe was born in Sunderland, England, on 31 August 1934. His parents were Scottish; the family moved back to Scotland in 1944 (living in Kilcreggan, Dunbartonshire) when his father took up an appointment with the Inland Revenue. He was educated at Greenock Academy and the University of Glasgow, where he graduated Master of Arts and Bachelor of Divinity. He also took postgraduate studies at Hartford Seminary in the United States.

He was ordained in 1960 by the Church of Scotland's Presbytery of Paisley; he was Assistant Minister at Paisley Abbey 1960-1963. Thereafter he was minister at Park Church, Dundee (1963-1972), followed by St Nicholas Parish Church, Lanark (1972-1988).

McIndoe was convener of the Church and Nation Committee from 1980 until 1984. He was Vice-Convener of the Business Committee of the General Assembly from 1988 until 1990. His final charge (1988-2000) was as minister at St Columba's Church, London linked with St Andrew's Church, Newcastle-upon-Tyne. He was the second successive Moderator to come from the Church of Scotland's Presbytery of England. His predecessor as Moderator was the Very Reverend James Harkness, former Chaplain-General to HM Forces. His full title (following the end of his Moderatorial year) was the Very Reverend Dr John Hedley McIndoe MA BD STM DD.

He and his wife Evelyn had three daughters. McIndoe died in Glasgow on 15 January 2022, at the age of 87.

== See also ==
- List of moderators of the General Assembly of the Church of Scotland

Religious titles
Preceded by James Harkness	Moderator of the General Assembly of the Church of Scotland; 1996–1997	Succeeded by Alexander McDonald
