= Josh Arksey =

English cricketer (born 1994)

Personal information
- Full name: Joshua Benjamin Thomas Arksey
- Born: 20 December 1994 (age 31); Cambridge, Cambridgeshire, England
- Batting: Right-handed
- Bowling: Slow left-arm orthodox

Domestic team information
- Years: Team
- 2014–2018: Cambridgeshire
- 2015–2016: Cambridge MCCU

Career statistics
Competition	First-class
Matches	2
Runs scored	14
Batting average	–
100s/50s	–/–
Top score	12*
Balls bowled	215
Wickets	7
Bowling average	29.28
5 wickets in innings	–
10 wickets in match	–
Best bowling	3/41
Catches/stumpings	1/–
- Source: Cricinfo, 18 July 2019

Joshua Benjamin Thomas Arksey (born 20 December 1994) is an English former first-class cricketer.

Arksey was born at Cambridge in December 1994. He was educated at Bottisham School, before going up to Anglia Ruskin University. While studying at Anglia Ruskin, Arksey made two appearances in first-class cricket for Cambridge MCCU against Northamptonshire in 2015, and Nottinghamshire in 2016. A slow left-arm orthodox bowler, Arksey took 7 wickets at an average of 29.28 in these two matches, with best figures of 3 for 41. In addition to playing first-class cricket, he also played minor counties cricket for Cambridgeshire from 2014–18, making fourteen appearances in the Minor Counties Championship, seven appearances in the MCCA Knockout Trophy, and two appearances in the Minor Counties T20.
