= David Tennant =

Scottish actor (born 1971)

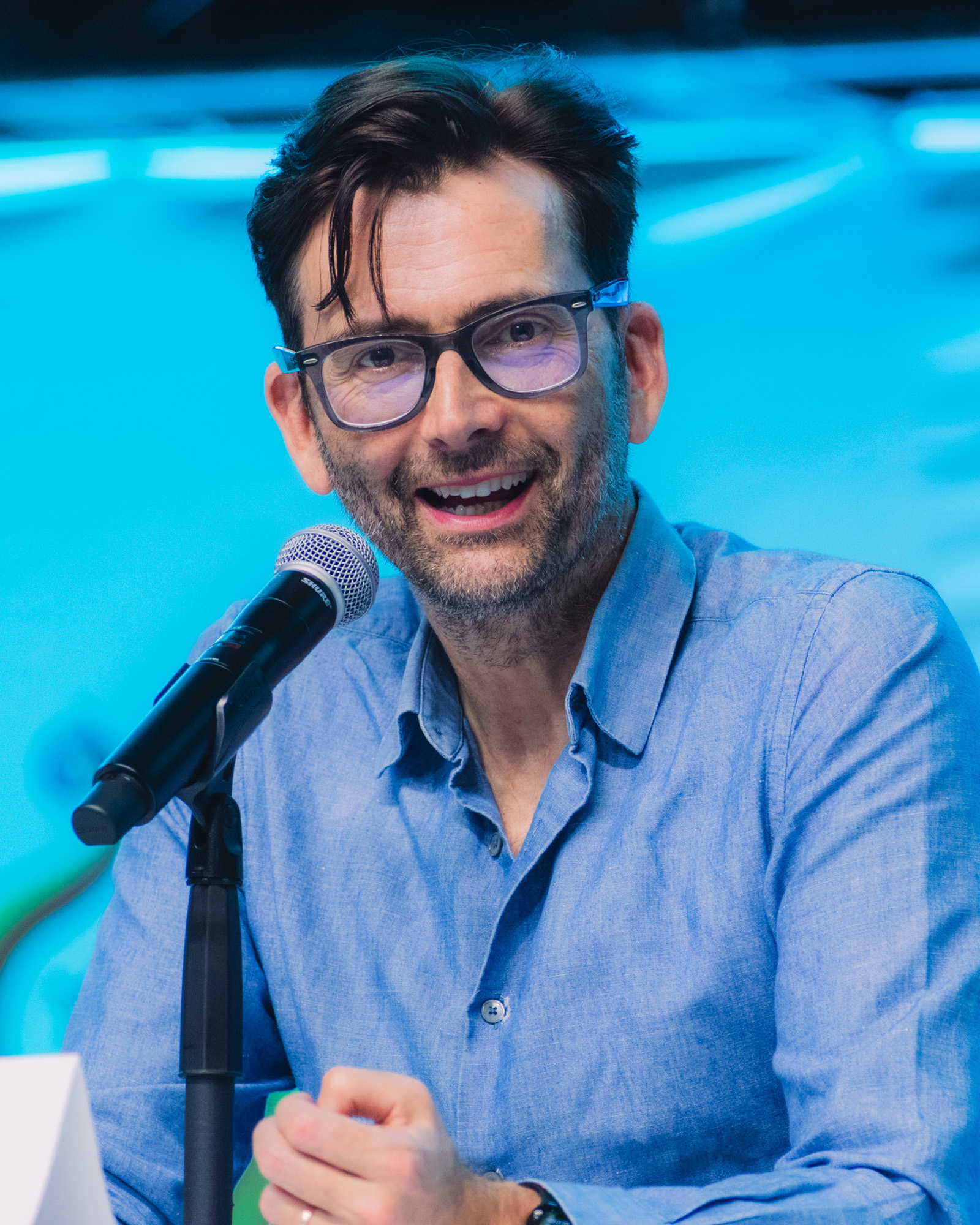
- Tennant in 2025
- Born: David John McDonald; 18 April 1971 (age 55); Bathgate, West Lothian, Scotland
- Education: Royal Scottish Academy of Music and Drama (BA)
- Years active: 1987–present
- Works: Full list
- Spouse: Georgia Moffett (m. 2011)
- Children: 5, including Ty
- Relatives: Sandy McDonald (father); Archie McLeod (grandfather); Peter Davison (father-in-law); Sandra Dickinson (mother-in-law)
- Awards: Full list
- Tennant's voice Tennant pledging his support for DiEM25's Your NHS Needs You campaign. Recorded 8 November 2021

David John Tennant (né McDonald; born 18 April 1971) is a Scottish actor. His accolades include two BAFTA Scotland Awards, two Emmy Awards and nominations for three Laurence Olivier Awards. Raised in Paisley, Tennant trained at the Royal Conservatoire of Scotland and began his acting career primarily working in theatre. His first major television role was in the BBC drama Takin' Over the Asylum (1994). He gained further recognition for the serials Blackpool (2004) and Casanova (2005), and appeared in Harry Potter and the Goblet of Fire (2005).

A childhood fan of the science fiction series Doctor Who, Tennant starred as the tenth incarnation of the Doctor from 2005 to 2010. His portrayal is among the most popular interpretations of the character, and he returned as the Fourteenth Doctor in 2023. Tennant's further television roles include DI Alec Hardy in Broadchurch (2013–2017), Kilgrave in Jessica Jones (2015–2019), Crowley in Good Omens (2019–2026), Dennis Nilsen in Des (2020) and various fictionalised versions of himself in Staged (2020–2022). He is also a voice actor, voicing Scrooge McDuck in DuckTales (2017–2021) and the droid Huyang in the Star Wars series The Clone Wars (2012) and Ahsoka (2023).

Tennant has worked extensively on stage, including in Royal Shakespeare Company productions of As You Like It (1996), Romeo and Juliet (2000), Hamlet (2008–2009) and Richard II (2013, 2016); his Hamlet was adapted for television in 2009. He also starred in West End productions of Much Ado About Nothing (2011) and Macbeth (2023–2024). In 2015, he was the recipient of the Special Recognition Award at the National Television Awards.

== Early life and education ==
Tennant was born David John McDonald in Bathgate, West Lothian, on 18 April 1971, the son of Helen (née McLeod) and Alexander "Sandy" McDonald. His father was a Presbyterian minister who served as the Moderator of the General Assembly of the Church of Scotland, and his mother was a charity worker. Tennant grew up in Paisley with an elder brother and an elder sister. Tennant was born with an extra toe on his right foot. He has suffered from acute anxiety since childhood.

Tennant's maternal grandfather was Derry City F.C. footballer Archie McLeod. On the genealogy documentary programme Who Do You Think You Are? in 2006, Tennant traced his maternal ancestry back to tenant farmers from the Isle of Mull and Ulster Protestants from Derry, Ireland.

At the age of three, Tennant told his parents that he wanted to become an actor because he was a fan of Doctor Who, but they encouraged him to pursue a more conventional career to ensure financial security. Nevertheless he was "absurdly single-minded" in pursuing an acting career. Tennant was educated at Ralston Primary School and Paisley Grammar School. His performance as the title character in a school production of the musical Gypsum's Journey was noticed by actress Edith MacArthur, who told his parents that she believed they would one day act together on stage. They ultimately did twice, in a 1987 Royal Lyceum production of Hay Fever and a 1994 Dundee Rep production of Long Day's Journey into Night. From the age of 11, Tennant attended Saturday classes at the Royal Conservatoire of Scotland. He passed the entry audition at the age of 16, becoming one of the Conservatoire's youngest students, and in 1991 he graduated with a BA degree in Dramatic Studies (accredited by the University of Glasgow).

Tennant uses a stage name because another David McDonald was already represented by the actor's union Equity. He adopted the surname of Pet Shop Boys frontman Neil Tennant after looking through an issue of the music magazine Smash Hits for inspiration. By 2013, he had legally changed his surname to Tennant to comply with rules set by the American Screen Actors Guild (which was later merged into SAG-AFTRA).

== Career ==
=== Early work ===
Tennant made his professional acting debut at the age of 16, in an anti-smoking film for the Glasgow Health Board. His "first proper foray onto the boards" was with a local church group in the murder mystery production Wanted, One Body. He appeared in the 1988 Dramarama episode "The Secret of Croftmore". In Tennant's final year at drama school he took the title role in Mozart from A to Z. After graduating, he joined the touring agitprop theatre group 7:84; his first acting role as a graduate was in their production of Bertolt Brecht's play The Resistible Rise of Arturo Ui, co-starring Ashley Jensen. He subsequently performed in repertory theatre at the Royal Lyceum Theatre and Dundee Repertory Theatre.

Tennant played a small part in the television drama Strathblair (1992) and sufficiently impressed director David Blair that he was offered a role in an unaired sitcom pilot with Arnold Brown. Tennant portrayed a transgender barmaid in a 1993 episode of the Scottish sitcom Rab C. Nesbitt. He auditioned for the Scottish detective series Taggart 16 times but was rejected, leading him to joke that he was the "only Scottish actor alive who hasn't been in Taggart". Tennant's first major television role was as bipolar teenager Campbell Bain in Blair's acclaimed BBC Scotland drama serial Takin' Over the Asylum (1994). On his audition, Tennant recalled that the production team "needed someone who could believably act 19 and bonkers". Takin' Over the Asylum became a cult hit and Tennant moved to London in 1995, lodging with his co-star and friend Arabella Weir, whom he had met during filming. Tennant and Weir lived together for five years, and he later became godfather to Weir's youngest child.

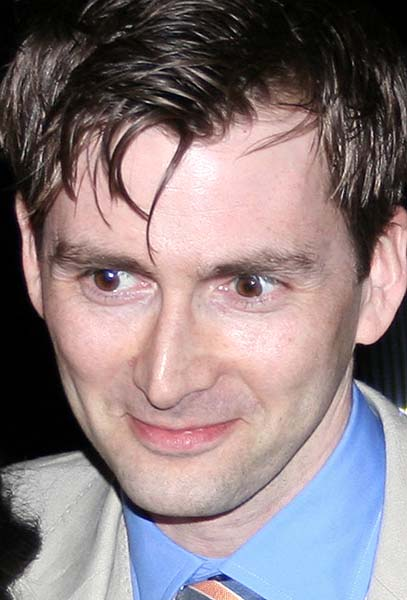
Tennant in 2007

Throughout the late 1990s, Tennant primarily worked in British theatre. He appeared in Joe Orton's What the Butler Saw at the Royal National Theatre in 1995. Tennant performed with the Royal Shakespeare Company for two seasons and first appeared in their 1996 production of As You Like It; having auditioned for the role of Orlando, he was instead cast as the jester Touchstone. He went on to play Antipholus of Syracuse in The Comedy of Errors, Jack in The Rivals and Romeo in Romeo and Juliet. He also contributed to several Shakespeare audio dramatisations for the Arkangel Shakespeare series (1998). Tennant continued to take roles on screen; he made his film debut as a drunk undergraduate in Michael Winterbottom's Jude (1996) and took the lead role in the American romantic comedy film L. A. Without a Map (1998). He appeared in the first episode of the television series Randall & Hopkirk (Deceased) (2000) as a vain artist, and starred in a television advertisement for Boots which aired over Christmas 2002.

In 2002, Tennant played Jeff in Kenneth Lonergan's Lobby Hero at Donmar Warehouse and New Ambassadors Theatre, for which he was nominated for the 2003 Laurence Olivier Award for Best Actor. He appeared in Stephen Fry's film Bright Young Things (2003), an adaptation of Evelyn Waugh's novel Vile Bodies (1930). Tennant starred as Katurian in the 2003 National Theatre production of Martin McDonagh's The Pillowman. He took his first leading television role in He Knew He Was Right (2004) as Reverend Gibson, and received further recognition for playing DI Peter Carlisle in the musical television serial Blackpool (2004) with David Morrissey and Sarah Parish. In January and February 2005, he starred as Jimmy Porter in the play Look Back in Anger at the Theatre Royal, Bath, and Royal Lyceum Theatre. He revived this performance in 2006 for the anniversary of the Royal Court Theatre. Tennant was cast as Briscoe in The Quatermass Experiment (2005), a live television film remake of The Quatermass Experiment (1953). He played Barty Crouch Jr. in the film Harry Potter and the Goblet of Fire (2005), at the time his most internationally recognised role.

=== Doctor Who ===
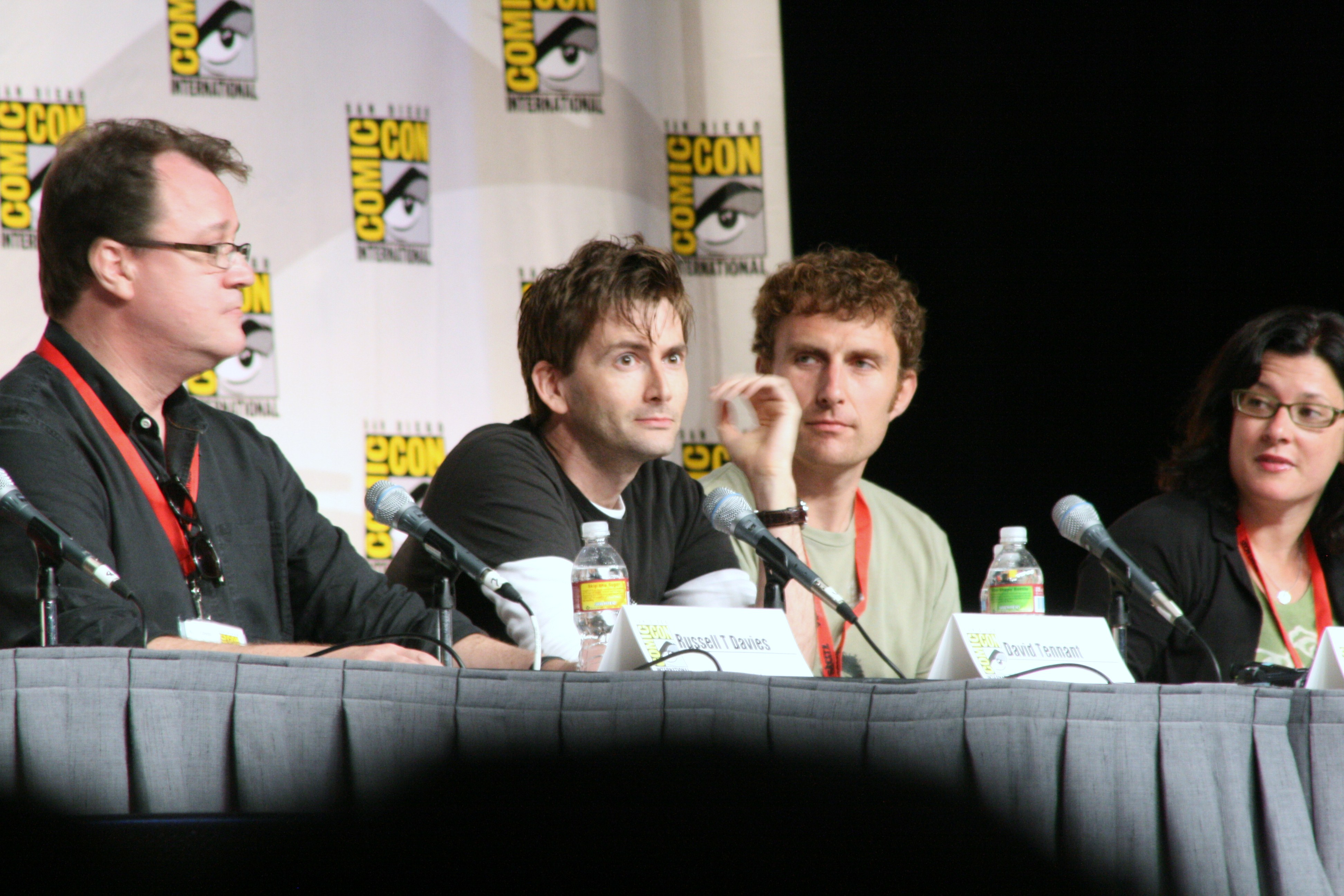
Tennant with Doctor Who showrunner Russell T Davies (left), regular director Euros Lyn (centre right), and executive producer Julie Gardner (right) at San Diego Comic-Con in July 2009

Tennant grew up a fan of the BBC television series Doctor Who and watched the series avidly during Tom Baker and Peter Davison's tenures as the Doctor; as a child, he spoke to Baker at a book-signing event in Glasgow. Tennant has credited the series as "a massive influence" on his decision to pursue acting. His first role in a Doctor Who production was playing a Nazi guard in the audio drama Colditz (2001) produced by Big Finish Productions. He subsequently played supporting parts in the audio series Dalek Empire and Doctor Who Unbound, and had a small voice role in the BBC's animated webcast Scream of the Shalka (2003).

Doctor Who returned to television screens in March 2005 with Christopher Eccleston as the Ninth Doctor. Showrunner Russell T Davies was simultaneously producing the BBC Three television serial Casanova (2005) which starred Tennant in the title role. Eccleston departed Doctor Who after one series, and Davies and producer Julie Gardner subsequently offered Tennant the role of the Tenth Doctor after inviting him to Davies's house to review the new episodes. He debuted as the Doctor at the conclusion of the first series finale, "The Parting of the Ways" (2005).

Tennant played the role for three full series, airing annually from 2006 to 2008. Tennant's portrayal of the Doctor maintained the eccentricity of his predecessors but also established the character as a "romantic hero" which appealed to both newcomers and long-term fans. His tenure is credited for cementing the revived programme's popularity. In 2007, he won the BAFTA Cymru Award for Best Actor. The 2007 Christmas special "Voyage of the Damned" received 13.31 million viewers, the most for a Doctor Who episode since the 1970s. "Journey's End" (2008) was the first Doctor Who episode to be the most-viewed programme of the week. Tennant made his directorial debut on the 2007 Doctor Who Confidential episode "Do You Remember The First Time?" which accompanies the Doctor Who episode "Blink". Tennant's Doctor appeared alongside Peter Davison's Fifth Doctor in the Children in Need charity minisode "Time Crash" (2007). Tennant also starred in the animated Doctor Who serials The Infinite Quest (2007) and Dreamland (2009).

In October 2008, Tennant announced that he would be leaving the role after a series of specials (2008–2010), stating "I think it's better to go when there's a chance that people might miss you, rather than to hang around and outstay your welcome". The BBC considered ending Doctor Who with Tennant's departure. The final story he filmed as the incumbent Tenth Doctor was "The Wedding of Sarah Jane Smith", a serial of the Doctor Who spin-off series The Sarah Jane Adventures broadcast in October 2009. His final episode, "The End of Time: Part Two", aired on 1 January 2010 and concluded with the Tenth Doctor's regeneration into the Eleventh Doctor, portrayed by Matt Smith.

Tennant's performance as the Doctor has received widespread acclaim, and is often ranked alongside Tom Baker's Fourth Doctor as one of the best and most popular incarnations of the character. Tennant was voted "Best Doctor" in 2006 and 2009 in polls conducted by Doctor Who Magazine. The Tenth Doctor was voted the "coolest character on television" and the "nation's favourite Doctor" in polls conducted by Radio Times in 2007 and 2013 respectively. In 2016, Digital Spy readers voted the Tenth Doctor the best TV character of the 21st century.

==== Reprisals ====
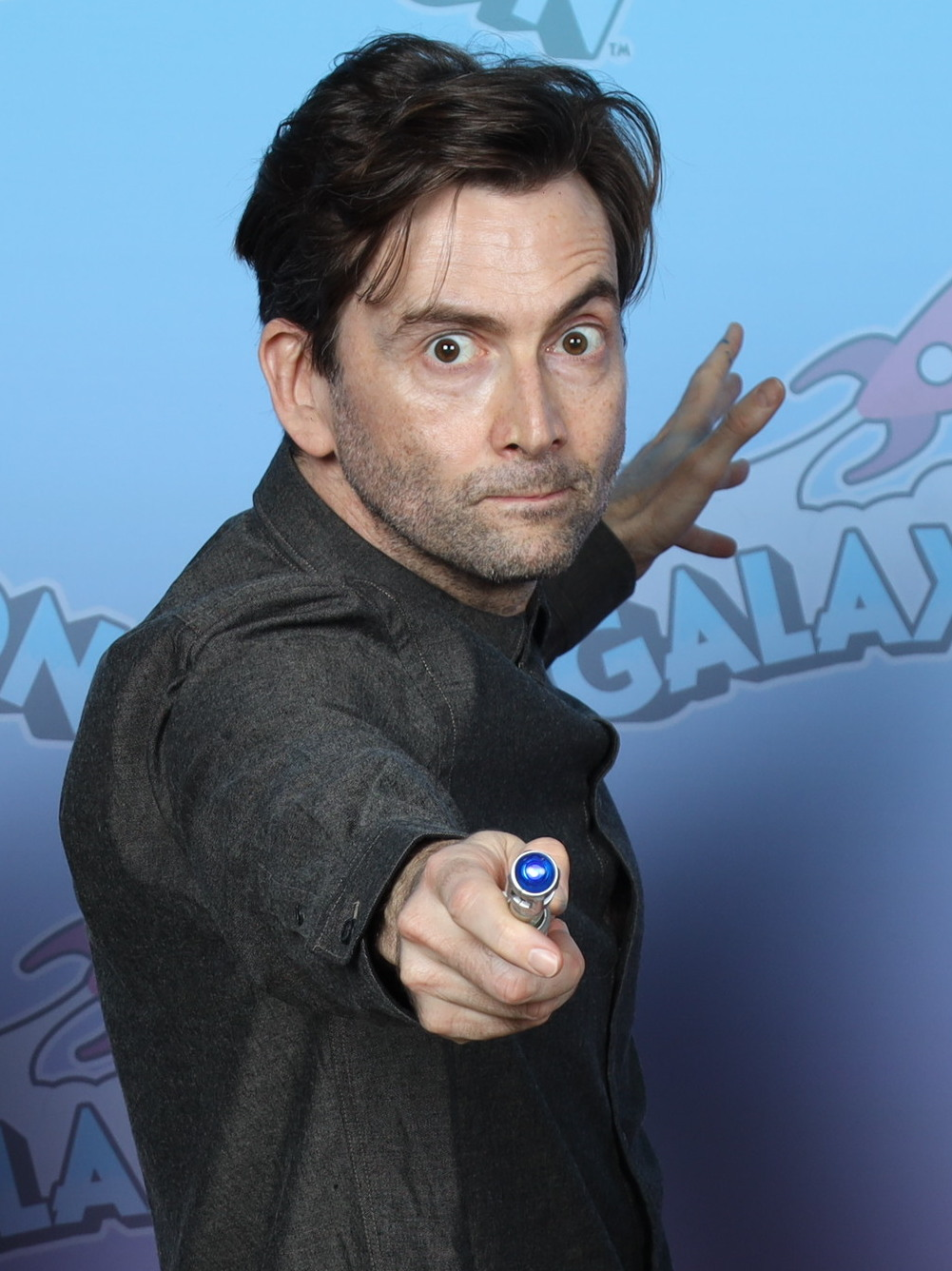
Tennant at GalaxyCon Richmond in 2023, posing with the Tenth Doctor's sonic screwdriver

Tennant returned to Doctor Who for the 50th anniversary special, "The Day of the Doctor", broadcast on 23 November 2013, co-starring Smith, Jenna Coleman, Billie Piper and John Hurt. The comedy short film The Five(ish) Doctors Reboot, directed by Peter Davison, was released later that day on the BBC Red Button service, with Tennant making a cameo appearance as a fictionalised version of himself.

In October 2015, Big Finish Productions announced that Tennant would reprise his role in the new audio drama series Doctor Who: The Tenth Doctor Adventures. Since May 2016, Tennant has led the series alongside former television co-stars including Catherine Tate as Donna Noble and Piper as Rose Tyler. Tennant reprised his role on 13 July 2018 as part of the live Muppets show The Muppets Take the O2 in London.

In May 2022, it was announced that Tennant and Tate would return to the show to commemorate its 60th anniversary. Tennant debuted as the Fourteenth Doctor in "The Power of the Doctor", broadcast in October 2022. The three 60th anniversary special episodes aired from November to December 2023, and concluded with the Fourteenth Doctor's "bi-generation" which introduced the Fifteenth Doctor, portrayed by Ncuti Gatwa.

=== 2005–2010 ===
Tennant appeared in the ITV drama Secret Smile in December 2005. He played sociologist Richard Hoggart in the 2006 BBC drama The Chatterley Affair, a dramatisation of the 1960 Lady Chatterley's Lover obscenity trial, directed by James Hawes. In early 2007, he played a man with a brain injury in the BBC drama Recovery, written by Tony Marchant. Tennant subsequently became a patron of Headway Essex, a charity that had been closely involved in the production. Later that same year he starred as a devout Christian driving instructor in Learners, a television film written by and starring Jessica Hynes. In November 2008, Tennant played Sir Arthur Eddington in the biographical film Einstein and Eddington, co-produced by the BBC and HBO.

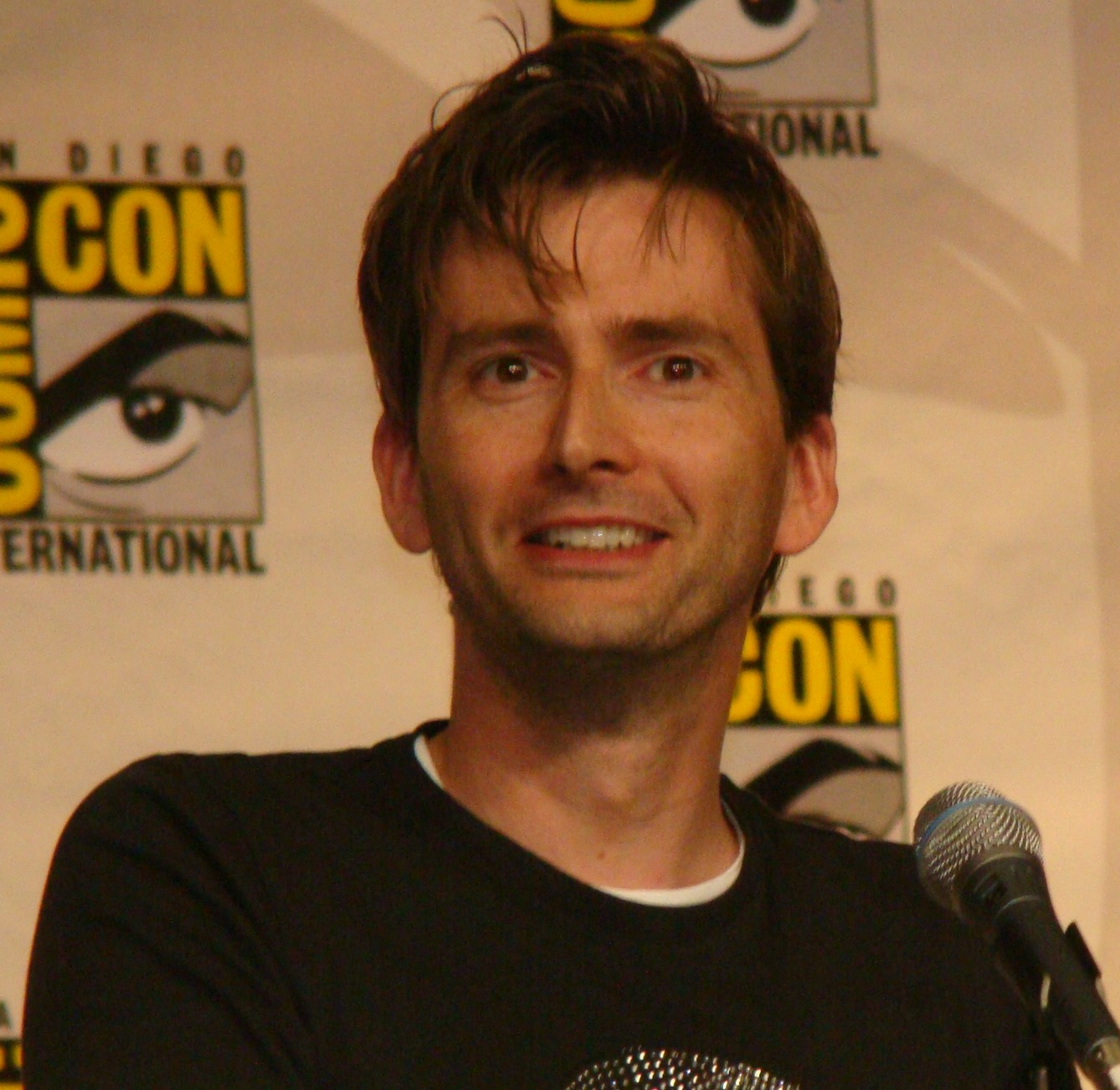
Tennant at San Diego Comic-Con 2009

Tennant described theatre work as his "default way of being". In August 2008, he began playing Prince Hamlet in the Royal Shakespeare Company's production of Hamlet at the Courtyard Theatre in Stratford-upon-Avon, directed by Gregory Doran, with Patrick Stewart as King Claudius. Tennant's popularity as the Doctor increased anticipation for the production. During that season, Doran also cast Tennant as Berowne in the RSC's Love's Labour's Lost; rehearsals began two days after Hamlet opened and the two plays ran concurrently. In December 2008, Hamlet transferred to the Novello Theatre in London's West End. Tickets sold out within under three hours. However, Tennant suffered a prolapsed disc during previews, and his understudy Edward Bennett took over the role from 8 December 2008 to 2 January 2009 while Tennant underwent back surgery. Tennant returned to the role from 3 January until the run's conclusion on 10 January. Tennant's performance as Prince Hamlet was largely critically acclaimed, with praise given for his energy, wit, humour and captivating stage presence, although some critics felt his portrayal lacked the character's fatalism and emotional depth.

In 2009, the Hamlet cast reunited to record a single-camera television film adaptation of the play, which was broadcast on BBC Two on Boxing Day 2009. Tennant advocated for the film to be produced: "It's what's great about the theatre - but it's also what's frustrating. When the run ends, it's gone." In 2011, a photograph of Tennant as Hamlet featured on a stamp issued by the Royal Mail to mark the RSC's fiftieth anniversary.

On 13 March 2009, Tennant co-presented the live charity event Red Nose Day 2009 with Davina McCall. He joined Franz Ferdinand onstage to play the guitar on a special Comic Relief edition of Top of the Pops. From October 2009, Tennant hosted the Masterpiece Contemporary programming strand on PBS in the United States. He appeared in the 2009 film St Trinian's 2: The Legend of Fritton's Gold. In November 2009, he was cast as Rex Alexander, a lawyer with an anxiety disorder in the NBC legal drama pilot Rex Is Not Your Lawyer; it was not ordered to series. Tennant appeared on Desert Island Discs on 27 December 2009. Tennant played George Milton in a 2010 BBC Radio 4 adaptation of Of Mice and Men in the Classic Serial strand. In October 2010 he starred as Dave, a man struggling to raise four children after the death of his partner, in the British drama Single Father.

=== 2011–2015 ===
Tennant starred in the 2011 television film United as Jimmy Murphy, assistant manager of Manchester United F.C., which dramatises the 1958 Munich air disaster that killed many of the team's "Busby Babes". He guest starred in a 2011 episode of the comedy series This Is Jinsy. Tennant played Benedick opposite Catherine Tate as Beatrice in a 2011 West End production of Shakespeare's Much Ado About Nothing. Tennant portrayed identical twins in the Christmas comedy film Nativity 2: Danger in the Manger (2012). Tennant abandoned plans to relocate to Hollywood to marry actress Georgia Moffet in 2011. Tennant appeared in True Love, a semi-improvised BBC One drama series broadcast in June 2012. Tennant voiced the droid Huyang in season 5 of the animated series Star Wars: The Clone Wars (2012), for which he won Outstanding Performer in an Animated Program at the 40th Daytime Creative Arts Emmy Awards.

Tennant presented the 2012 comedy quiz show Comedy World Cup. Tennant played the lead role of Jean-François Mercier in the BBC Four drama series Spies of Warsaw, an adaptation of Alan Furst's novel, shot in Poland and broadcast in June 2013. In 2013, Tennant starred in the political drama miniseries The Politician's Husband for BBC Two, playing an ambitious cabinet minister who takes drastic action when his wife's career starts to outshine his.

In January 2012, Tennant was appointed to the Royal Shakespeare Company board, and was on the committee to select its new artistic director. Tennant returned to the RSC for the company's 2013 winter season, playing the title role in Richard II at Stratford-upon-Avon from 10 October to 16 November and transferring to the Barbican Centre in London from 9 December to 25 January 2014. In 2016, Tennant reprised his performance as Richard II at the Barbican before transferring to the Brooklyn Academy of Music in New York.

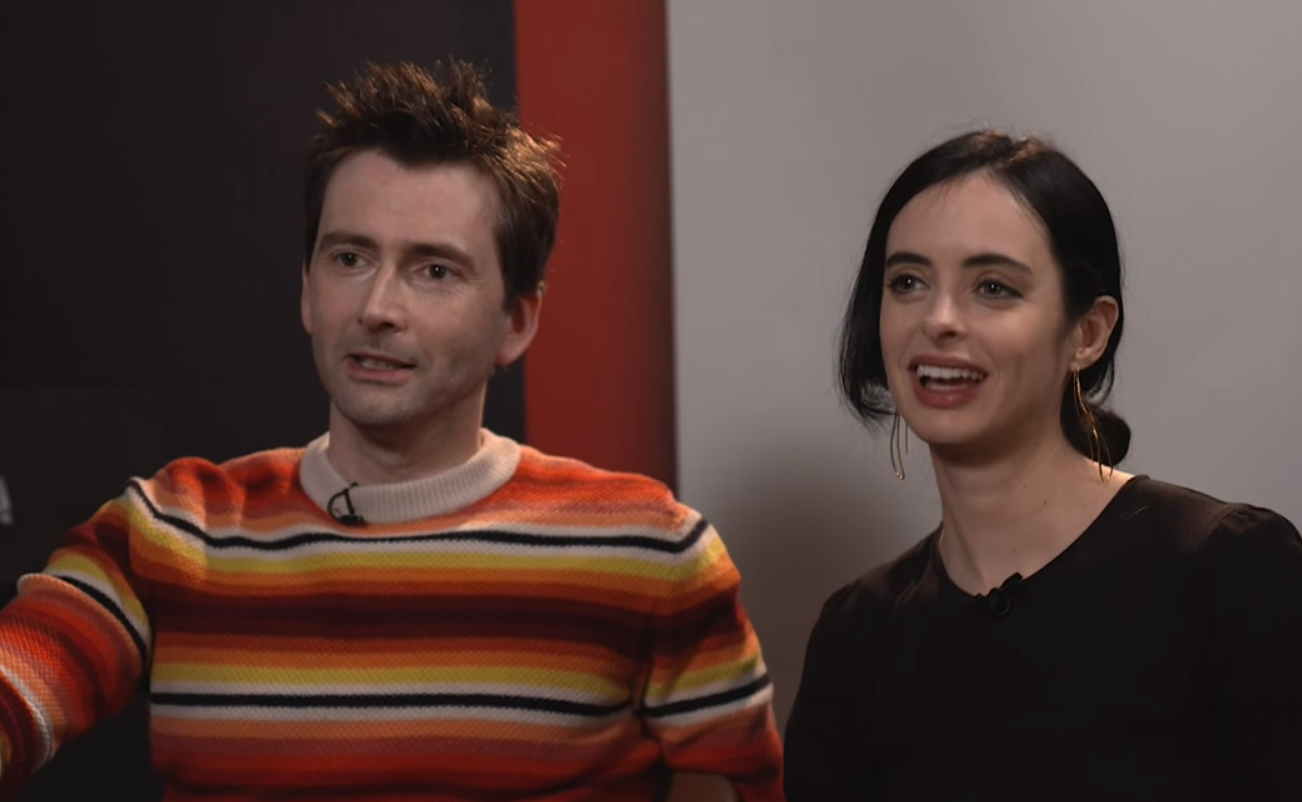
Tennant with Jessica Jones co-star Krysten Ritter in 2015

Tennant's biggest post-Doctor Who television role was as DI Alec Hardy in the ITV crime drama series Broadchurch, co-starring Olivia Colman and written by Chris Chibnall. Three series were released from 2013 to 2017, with the first series's finale becoming 2013's highest-rated drama in the UK. He reprised the role (renamed Emmett Carver) for the American remake Gracepoint (2014).

Tennant appeared in The Escape Artist, a three-part series which aired on BBC One in October and November 2013. For this role he won the BAFTA Scotland Award for Best Actor in Television. Tennant starred opposite Rosamund Pike and Billy Connolly in What We Did on Our Holiday, a 2014 semi-improvised comedy film. Tennant voiced a character in Postman Pat: The Movie (2014).

Tennant appeared on the Radio 4 panel show Just a Minute; his episode was broadcast on 9 February 2015, and he was the show's most successful debut contestant. Tennant portrayed the telepathic supervillain Kilgrave in the Marvel Cinematic Universe television series Jessica Jones, produced by Marvel and Netflix, which aired from 2015 to 2019. Tennant's performance was critically praised.

=== 2016–2023 ===
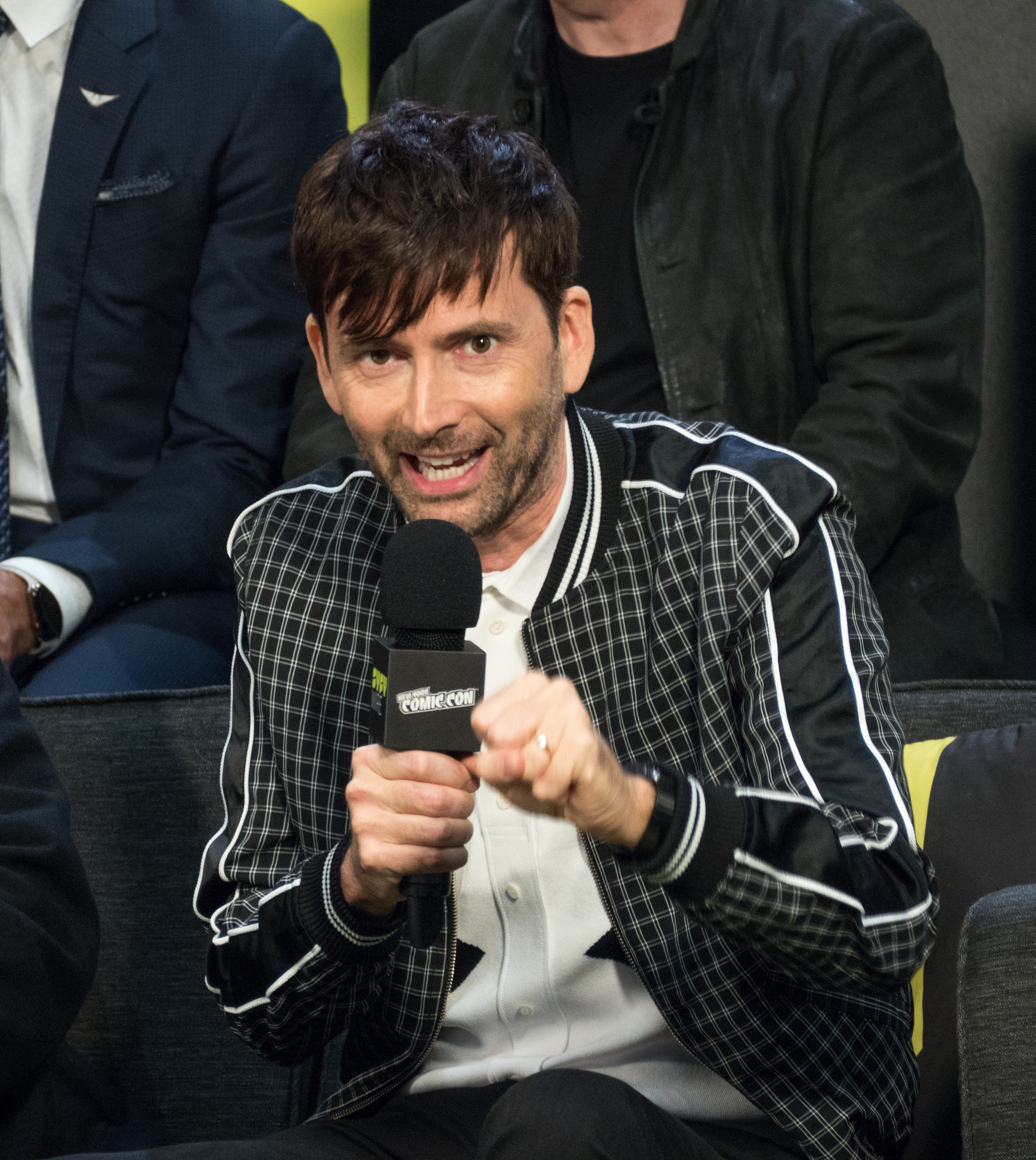
Tennant at a Good Omens panel at New York Comic Con 2018

In 2016, Tennant was cast as the voice of Scrooge McDuck for Disney XD's DuckTales reboot, replacing the late voice actor Alan Young. Tennant played Scottish psychiatrist R. D. Laing in the biographical film Mad to Be Normal, which premiered at the Glasgow Film Festival in February 2017. Between March and June of that year, Tennant appeared in Patrick Marber's Don Juan in Soho at Wyndham's Theatre. Later in the year, he appeared in writer-director Daisy Aitkens' romantic comedy film You, Me and Him (2017), co-produced by his wife Georgia. Tennant played villain Cale Erendreich in the thriller film Bad Samaritan (2018), written by Brandon Boyce and directed by Dean Devlin.

Tennant played the demon Crowley, opposite Michael Sheen as the angel Aziraphale, in the fantasy comedy series Good Omens, based on the 1990 book by Terry Pratchett and Neil Gaiman. The first season was released on Amazon Prime Video on 31 May 2019 and on BBC Two on 15 January 2020. A second season was released in 2023, and the series concluded with a 90-minute finale in 2026. Tennant and Sheen's on-screen chemistry was praised by critics and audiences.

Tennant launched the podcast David Tennant Does a Podcast With... in February 2019, in which he interviews former co-stars and other notable figures. Described by Tennant as a "side hustle", episodes have featured Olivia Colman, Whoopi Goldberg, Jodie Whittaker, Ian McKellen, Jon Hamm, Gordon Brown, Krysten Ritter, Samantha Bee, Michael Sheen, James Corden, Tina Fey, Judi Dench, Elisabeth Moss, Brian Cox and Dan Levy.

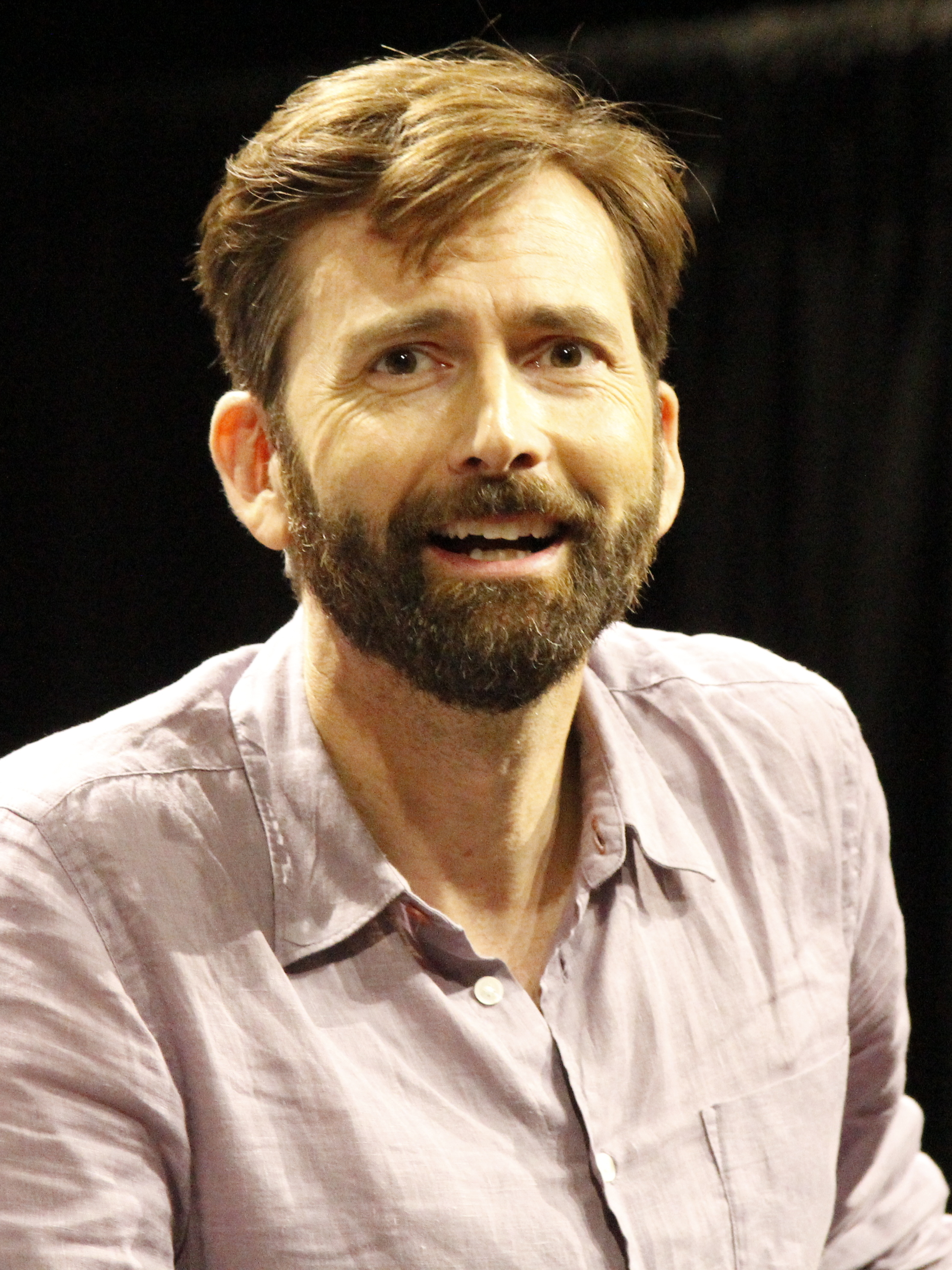
Tennant at GalaxyCon Raleigh in 2019

Tennant starred as a doctor suspected of murdering his family in Deadwater Fell, a Channel 4 Scottish miniseries which premiered in January 2020. He also received his first credit as an executive producer for the series. In September 2020, he portrayed Scottish serial killer Dennis Nilsen in the ITV crime drama miniseries Des, for which he won the 2021 International Emmy Award for Best Actor.

From 2020 to 2022, Tennant and Michael Sheen starred as fictionalised versions of themselves in the BBC series Staged, written and directed by Simon Evans. The first season, presented as video calls between the two actors in lockdown during the COVID-19 pandemic, follows Tennant and Sheen as they attempt to rehearse Luigi Pirandello's Six Characters in Search of an Author. The series incorporates metafictional elements; Evans plays himself and had been due to direct a play before the lockdowns. He developed the series to be achievable for the actors themselves to film whilst in lockdown. Tennant and Sheen were again praised for their dynamic, and the subsequent seasons of Staged introduced further metafiction elements.

Tennant played the leading role of Phileas Fogg in a 2021 television adaptation of Jules Verne's Around the World in Eighty Days. In September 2022, he starred as Reverend Harry Watling in the BBC serial Inside Man, written by Steven Moffat. The series premiered in September 2022 to mixed reviews from viewers and critics. In December 2022, Tennant starred as British-naturalised Russian defector Alexander Litvinenko in the ITV1 miniseries Litvinenko. Tennant reprised his vocal role as Huyang in the live-action Star Wars series Ahsoka (2023) and in season 2 of Young Jedi Adventures (2024). Tennant played the title role in Max Webster's production of Macbeth, opposite Cush Jumbo as Lady Macbeth, which ran at the Donmar Warehouse in 2023 and the Harold Pinter Theatre in 2024.

Tennant in 2023

=== 2024–present ===
Tennant won the BAFTA Scotland Award for Actor Television for the drama series There She Goes. Tennant hosted the 77th and 78th British Academy Film Awards in February 2024 and February 2025 respectively. Tennant joined the ensemble cast of Rivals, the Disney+ television adaptation of Jilly Cooper's Rutshire Chronicles novels, as Lord Tony Baddingham. The first two seasons of Rivals premiered in October 2024 and May 2026. In 2025, Tennant starred as The Guardian journalist Nick Davies, alongside Toby Jones as Alan Rusbridger, in The Hack, an ITV drama about the News International phone hacking scandal. Tennant was allegedly a victim of the scandal in 2017 and sued the owners of News of the World; it was settled out of court in January 2018. Tennant played Ian Ventham in the 2025 film The Thursday Murder Club.

In 2026, Tennant starred in the third season of Time, an anthology drama series written by Jimmy McGovern. Lucy Mangan, in a review for The Guardian, described Tennant as "restrained... in one of his best ever performances". Tennant will feature in the sixth season of the Hulu television series Only Murders in the Building.

== Public image ==
Tennant has been noted for his "chameleon-like" versatility in portraying a wide range of characters. He has described himself as "not conventional leading-man stuff". Russell T Davies stated in 2015 that Tennant's "lack of boring machismo" set him apart from his contemporaries. In 2013, The Guardian described Tennant as having a "reputation for being polite and chatty with a disarming line in self-deprecation". Tennant has often been described as a "heart throb", a label that he has rejected, stating "I don't think I would get cast as a straight romantic lead."

Tennant was named "Coolest Man on TV" in a 2007 Radio Times survey. He is a five-time winner of the public-voted National Television Award for Most Popular Actor/Outstanding Drama Performance, having won in 2006, 2007, 2008, 2010 and 2021.

In December 2005, The Stage placed Tennant at No. 6 in its "Top Ten" list of the most influential British television artists of the year, citing his roles in Blackpool, Casanova, Secret Smile, and Doctor Who. In July 2007, Tennant was ranked No. 24 in the MediaGuardian 100, a list of the most powerful people in the British media, and was described as "the most powerful actor in television".

In January 2006, readers of the British gay and lesbian newspaper The Pink Paper voted him the "Sexiest Man in the Universe". In March 2006, a poll of 10,000 women for New Woman placed Tennant at No. 20 in their Top 100 Men list. In October 2006, he was named "Scotland's most stylish male" in the Scottish Style Awards. He was voted 16th–Sexiest Man in the World by a 2008 Cosmopolitan survey.

Tennant is an ambassador for Worldwide Cancer Research and the Multibank charity.

== Political and social views ==
A self-proclaimed liberal and socialist, Tennant is a lifelong supporter of the Labour Party and appeared in a party political broadcast for them in 2005. He declared his support for Prime Minister Gordon Brown in the 2010 elections, lending his voice to a Labour election broadcast. He did so again in 2015, endorsing Ed Miliband. In 2017, on whether he was a fan of Jeremy Corbyn, Tennant responded "I'm a fan of the Labour Party."

Tennant remained neutral on the issue of Scottish independence in the run-up to the 2014 referendum, stating that it was not his business as he no longer lived in Scotland. Following Brexit, which he called "depressing", he said in 2017 that he would support an independent Scotland in the event of a second referendum.

Tennant is a supporter of the LGBTQ+ community, particularly those who identify as non-binary, and has frequently worn pride pins during interviews and public events. He received the LGBT+ Celebrity Ally award at the 2024 British LGBT Awards for his ongoing support for the LGBTQ+ community. While accepting the award, Tennant criticised Women and Equalities Minister Kemi Badenoch for her views on trans issues, saying that "acknowledging that everyone has the right to be who they want to be and live their life how they want to live it" should not merit special recognition, but that "until we wake up and Kemi Badenoch doesn't exist anymore – I don't wish ill of her, I just wish her to shut up – whilst we do live in this world I am honoured to receive this [award]". Badenoch, Prime Minister Rishi Sunak and author J. K. Rowling criticised Tennant's remarks. Labour leader Keir Starmer stated that he "wouldn't have engaged the way [Tennant] did", and Labour MP Dawn Butler expressed support for Tennant's position.

== Personal life ==
Tennant rarely discusses his private life in interviews.

Tennant dated British actress Anne-Marie Duff in 2000 and English actress Sophia Myles in 2006. In December 2011, Tennant married English actress Georgia Tennant (née Moffett), making him the son-in-law of actress Sandra Dickinson and Fifth Doctor actor Peter Davison. The couple met in 2008 during the filming of the Doctor Who episode "The Doctor's Daughter". They have five children, including actor Ty Tennant, Moffett's son from a previous relationship whom Tennant adopted, and live in the Chiswick district of London. In addition to Ty, their other children have also acted.

Tennant described his parents as "liberal, progressive Christians" and believes religion "must have" shaped his character. He stated that "organised religion gave [him] a good moral compass" and is an occasional churchgoer.

== Performance credits ==
Tennant has undertaken numerous roles on screen (film and television), as well as narration for TV series and audiobooks. He has also performed or narrated in video games and web series.

== Accolades ==
Tennant has been nominated for a British Academy Scotland Award seven times, winning for The Escape Artist in 2014 and There She Goes in 2024. He was also nominated for the British Academy Television Award for Best Actor in 2025 for Rivals. Tennant has been nominated three times for the Laurence Olivier Award for Best Actor: in 2003 for Lobby Hero, in 2023 for Good, and in 2024 for Macbeth.

He won Outstanding Performer in an Animated Program at the 40th Daytime Creative Arts Emmy Awards and Best Performance by an Actor at the 49th International Emmy Awards.

Tennant received the Special Recognition Award at the 20th National Television Awards in London in 2015. In 2016, he was awarded an honorary doctorate in drama by his alma mater, the Royal Conservatoire of Scotland.

== Bibliography ==
Forewords

- Tennant, David (2006). Foreword. Doctor Who: The Inside Story. By Russell, Gary. BBC Books. ISBN 978-0563486497.
- Tennant, David (2011). Foreword. Elisabeth Sladen: The Autobiography. By Sladen, Elisabeth. Aurum Press. ISBN 978-1845134884.
- Tennant, David (2017). Foreword. Is There Life Outside The Box? An Actor Despairs. By Davison, Peter. John Blake. ISBN 978-1786061126.

== See also ==
- List of International Emmy Award winners
- List of actors who have played the Doctor
