= Neil Arksey =

British writer

- Occupations: Children's author Story editor Showrunner; Screenwriter; Producer
- Writing career
- Notable works: Brooksie; Result! Flint; MacB; Playing on the Edge
- Notable awards: Playing on the Edge shortlisted for the Blue Peter Book Awards, 2001
- Website: www.neilarksey.com

Neil Arksey is a British writer, known for his work in TV drama and for his novels for middle grade, teenage and young adult readers, published by Penguin Books and Random House.

== Career ==
Early in his career, Arksey helped develop Little Robots, a pre-school TV show broadcast on BBC in the United Kingdom. He went on to write scripts for Little Robots as well as a number of other shows aimed at the same age group, including Kipper the Dog.

As a story editor, script editor, head writer and producer, Arksey has worked on a number of UK soaps and drama series Crossroads, River City, Family Affairs and Mile High. He has also worked as head writer/producer on TV drama series in other European countries, including Salatut Elämät in Finland and Jobán Rosszban in Hungary.

He worked as a screenwriter and producer on the feature film Run to Ground, a dark thriller set and shot in Miskolc, eastern Hungary.

His book Intelligent Life received considerable acclaim from a number of top scientists.

Arksey teaches writing at CityLit, London Film School and Brunel University.

== Books ==
- Brooksie
- Result!
- Flint
- MacB
- Playing on the Edge (shortlisted for the Blue Peter Book Awards 2001)
- Sudden Death
- As Good As Dead In Downtown
- Intelligent Life
- Alltalk
- Shoot
