= Worldwide Cancer Research =

- Founded: 1979
- Type: Charitable organisation
- Registration no.: Scotland: No 152991: Charity No SC022918
- Purpose: Cancer research
- Location: Third Floor South, 121 George Street, Edinburgh EH2 4YN
- Coordinates: 56.3389219°N 2.7973801°W
- Region served: Worldwide
- Key people: Dr Helen Rippon (CEO), The Earl of St. Andrews (Patron)
- Revenue: £17 million (2013)
- Website: worldwidecancerresearch.org
- Formerly called: Association for International Cancer Research

Worldwide Cancer Research is Scotland’s only cancer research charity. It funds discovery research (also called early-stage, basic or fundamental research) worldwide that aims to lay the groundwork for cures for cancer.

The team of 50 currently works to fund £6.5 million of cancer research around the world every year – raised entirely from donations.

Established in 1979, Worldwide Cancer Research has awarded over £180 million in research grants in 34 different countries.

Dr Helen Rippon is the Chief Executive of the charity, appointed in 2016. Previously the charity’s Director of Research, she has over 17 years of experience in the field of cancer research – including a PhD in Molecular Biology from the University of York – and was a Postdoctoral Research Fellow at Imperial College London.

The head office is in central Edinburgh, Scotland and its charitable registration is at the Office of the Scottish Charity Regulator.

== See also ==
- European Organisation for Research and Treatment of Cancer
