= Recovery (film) =

- Written by: Tony Marchant
- Directed by: Andy DeEmmony
- Starring: David Tennant; Sarah Parish
- Theme music composer: Tristin Norwell and Nick Green
- Country of origin: United Kingdom
- Original language: English

Production
- Running time: 90 minutes (approx.)

Original release
- Network: BBC One
- Release: 25 February 2007

Recovery is a 2007 British television film directed by Andy DeEmmony and starring David Tennant and Sarah Parish. It was written by Tony Marchant, and first broadcast on BBC One.

== Summary ==
It deals with the life of Alan Hamilton, the former head of a construction firm, after he receives serious personality-changing brain injuries in a road accident, and the emotional feeling of his family. Tricia, his wife struggles because the man she knew has gone. Throughout the programme she tries to bring him back through memories, photographs, her sons and herself.

== Cast ==
- David Tennant as Alan Hamilton
- Sarah Parish as Tricia Hamilton
- Harry Treadaway as Dean Hamilton
- Jacob Théato as Joel Hamilton
- Ron Donachie as Len Hamilton
- Jay Simpson as Johnathon
- Jo McInnes as Gwen
- Jim Carter as Dr Lockwood
- Jo Hartley as Vicky Nathan

=== Cast Notes ===
This marks the third time that David Tennant and Sarah Parish have worked together. The first was the 2004 serial, Blackpool, where David played a DI who falls in love with his suspect's wife (Parish), and the second was the Doctor Who Christmas special, "The Runaway Bride", where Tennant played his usual role as the Doctor and Parish played a giant alien spider called the Empress of the Racnoss.

=== Music ===
The music was especially commissioned and composed by Tristin Norwell and Nick Green.

== Reception ==
- The Liverpool Echo called Recovery "perhaps the best thing David Tennant's ever done."
- The Herald called it "one of TV's saddest, most harrowing dramas ever" and encouraged people to donate to the brain injury charity, Headway, whether they had seen the drama or not.
- The Times said that "Tennant and Parish made it affecting viewing" and that they also "thankfully avoided the Hollywood trend to use memory loss as a gateway to deeper healing, a little miracle to help us forget our mean adult selves and learn to be innocent again."
- The Guardian said "It wasn't over-sentimental, just believable. And much more powerful for that. Anyone who says they didn't have a lump in their throats is either an unfeeling brute or a liar."
- The Scotsman said, "This is sobering, saddening stuff, a tragic portrait of a living hell which, if nothing else, should encourage you to be more vigilant the next time you cross the road."
