= What We Did on Our Holiday =

- Theatrical release poster
- Directed by: Andy Hamilton; Guy Jenkin
- Written by: Andy Hamilton; Guy Jenkin
- Produced by: Norman Merry; Suzanne Reid; Ed Rubin; David M Thompson; Dan Winch
- Starring: David Tennant; Rosamund Pike; Billy Connolly
- Cinematography: Martin Hawkins
- Edited by: Steve Tempia; Mark Williams
- Music by: Alex Heffes
- Production companies: BBC Films; Creative Scotland; LipSync Productions; Origin Pictures; Ingenious Media; Independent
- Distributed by: Lionsgate (United Kingdom/United States)
- Release date: 26 September 2014
- Running time: 95 minutes
- Country: United Kingdom
- Language: English
- Budget: £3.5 million
- Box office: $10.7 million

What We Did on Our Holiday is a 2014 British black comedy-drama film written and directed by Andy Hamilton and Guy Jenkin. It was inspired by, but not related to, the BBC show Outnumbered. The film stars David Tennant, Rosamund Pike, and Billy Connolly.

What We Did on Our Holiday was released in the United Kingdom on September 26, 2014, by Lionsgate.

== Plot ==
Doug McLeod (David Tennant) and his wife Abi (Rosamund Pike) unite following a tense separation to travel to the Scottish Highlands for Doug's father Gordie's (Billy Connolly) 75th birthday. Gordie has terminal cancer, so Doug's brother, millionaire Gavin McLeod (Ben Miller), has arranged a lavish party for him, inviting all the important people in the neighbourhood. Despite difficulties getting their three children, Lottie (Emilia Jones), Mickey (Bobby Smalldridge), and Jess (Harriet Turnbull), to leave the house, they hit the road, but find it congested and they are forced to stop overnight.

Lottie expresses distrust of her parents following their recent separation and lies to each other; it is revealed that Doug had an affair, which led to Abi moving out and starting divorce proceedings. They are only travelling to the Highlands together to appear as a couple for Gordie, not wanting to upset him in his final months.

On arriving at Gavin's mansion, a tense rivalry becomes apparent between Doug and Gavin. Gordie, despite being extremely ill, is fun-loving and encourages his grandchildren, particularly Lottie, to let go of their troubles and enjoy life. While Gavin, Doug, Abi and Gavin's wife Margaret (Amelia Bullmore) make the final arrangements for the party, Gordie takes the three children to the beach, declaring that he is descended from Vikings. While Lottie, Mickey and Jess are playing, Gordie dies peacefully.

Lottie returns to the house to tell the adults, leaving her siblings with Gordie's body. However, when she arrives she sees them all arguing, Abi telling Doug she is seeing someone else and will be moving the children to Newcastle, and Gavin with his family over what Gordie wants for his birthday. She returns to the beach without telling them. The three children, using fuel from Gordie's pickup, send him out to sea aflame on an improvised raft, fulfilling his last wish, to be buried "Viking style".

The children return home and tell the adults what has happened. The adults are horrified, and Doug and Gavin head to the beach, where they find Gordie's pick-up truck partially submerged by the high tide; Gavin breaks down in Doug's arms. Abi and Margaret break the news of Gordie's death to the party guests, and word quickly gets out about what the children did. The police arrive to investigate, accompanied by social worker Agnes Chisholm (Celia Imrie), who interviews the children about their actions, and after speaking with Lottie she contemplates removing them from Doug and Abi's care. The press descends on the house, with Lottie, Jess and Mickey's actions making headlines worldwide.

While using Gavin and Margaret's son Kenneth's (Lewis Davie) computer, Mickey and Jess stumble upon a video of Gavin's wife Margaret attacking a fellow shopper at a supermarket as a result of depression, and accidentally stream it to all the screens in the house. Gavin learns of his wife's issues for the first time. After the press paints the children's actions as depraved, Doug and Abi make a statement to the press that what their children did was not malicious, and that they support their efforts to honour their grandfather, however misguided. Seeing the support the children receive, Chisholm ends her investigation, leaving the children with their parents.

Gavin and Doug hold a memorial for Gordie at the beach, after burying the hatchet.

Abi tells Doug she will not be moving to Newcastle, and the couple decide to divorce civilly, apologising to their children. The film ends with the five of them playfully splashing around on the shoreline.

== Cast ==
- David Tennant as Doug McLeod
- Rosamund Pike as Abi McLeod
- Billy Connolly as Gordie McLeod
- Celia Imrie as Agnes Chisholm
- Ben Miller as Gavin McLeod
- Emilia Jones as Lottie McLeod
- Amelia Bullmore as Margaret McLeod
- Annette Crosbie as Doreen
- Lewis Davie as Kenneth McLeod
- Ralph Riach as Jimmy Cazzarotto
- Ben Presley as PC McLuhan
- Bobby Smalldridge as Mickey McLeod
- Alexia Barlier as Françoise Dupré
- Ryan Hunter as Frazer
- Harriet Turnbull as Jess McLeod
- Jake D'Arcy as "Smokey"

== Production ==
The film was shot on location in Glasgow and the Scottish Highlands between 27 June and 2 August 2013. The beach scenes were filmed at Gairloch. The family home of Gavin McLeod is in Drymen near Loch Lomond. The ostriches farmed by Gordie's friend Doreen are actually located at Blair Drummond Safari Park.

== Release ==
What We Did on Our Holiday was released in the United Kingdom on 26 September 2014 and in the United States as What We Did on Our Vacation on 10 July 2015.

=== Box office ===
The film earned $6,390,566 in the United Kingdom and $1,976,185 in Australia, New Zealand, and the United Arab Emirates, totalling $8,366,751 worldwide.

=== Critical reception ===
Review aggregator website Rotten Tomatoes reports a 73% rating based on 41 reviews with an average rating of 6.2/10. The site's consensus states: "Witty and well-cast, What We Did on Our Holiday injects unlikely laughs into a story dealing with dark, difficult themes." On Metacritic, the film has a 54 out of 100 rating, based on 14 critics.
