= Prisoner of the Daleks =

2009 novel by Trevor Baxendale

- Author: Trevor Baxendale
- Series: Doctor Who book: New Series Adventures
- Release number: 33
- Subject: Featuring: Tenth Doctor
- Set in: Period between "Journey's End" and "The End of Time"
- Publisher: BBC Books
- Publication date: 2 April 2009
- Media type: Hardcover/CD
- Pages: 256
- ISBN: 184607-641-2
- Preceded by: The Slitheen Excursion
- Followed by: The Taking of Chelsea 426

Prisoner of the Daleks is a BBC Books original novel written by Trevor Baxendale and based on the long-running British science fiction television series Doctor Who. It features the Tenth Doctor without a companion and was released on 2 April 2009, alongside Judgement of the Judoon and The Slitheen Excursion.

== Plot ==
The TARDIS arrives on the planet Hurala. Whilst investigating the deserted site the Doctor makes his way to the base's computer data core room, where he is locked inside by the computer along with the corpse of another person previously trapped inside.

Five days later, the bounty hunter ship Wayfarer lands on the planet, its crew hoping to use the fuel stores to refuel the ship. They soon come across the TARDIS, and then hear a repeating tapping noise. One of them, called Scrum, realises that it's a Morse code SOS message. They quickly trace it to the computer data core room where they find and free the Doctor, who has been sending it out with a spoon. On the insistence of the Doctor and another of the bounty hunters, Stella, the group investigate the computer's systems. They discover an override which, when activated, took control of the base and trapped the Doctor. Someone had used the computer to set a trap. Who did is soon answered when the group are attacked by a Dalek patrol.

The Doctor and the bounty hunters, who now reveal that they kill Daleks for a living, race back to the Wayfarer, escape to the TARDIS being blocked by Daleks. They manage to take off but the Daleks blow up a refuelling pump, sending debris flying into the ship through the open landing ramp, badly wounding Stella. As the crew attempt to put her into cryo-freeze a Dalek manages to get into the ship through an air-lock, and exterminates Stella. Before it can kill anyone else the Doctor freezes it using the emergency cryo-charge intended for Stella. With the Dalek immobilised Stella's body is also frozen and the crew make a course for Auros, Stella's home world. On the way, the Dalek's eye stalk is removed so that the crew can claim the prize-money for killing it, and it is placed in the cargo hold. Whilst talking with the crew the Doctor realises that he's travelled back along the time line to before the Time War. At this point in history the Daleks are locked in a huge galactic war with Earth's first empire, at a moment when victory can go either way. The Doctor also learns more about the crew. Commanding the ship is Bowman, a former Earth trooper who has been fighting the Daleks for years and is a veteran of the Draconian Wars. Scrum is the crew's technician, Cuttin' Edge is a former Space Marine who was dishonorably discharged and Stella was the ship's Medic. The other crew member, Koral, is a humanoid alien whose planet and people of Red Sky Lost were destroyed by the Daleks.

Upon arriving at Auros the Doctor and the crew discover that the planet's population are abandoning the planet as the Daleks are preparing to invade. Using the Osterhagen Principle, they detonate a series of nuclear bombs and destroy the planet to prevent it falling to the Daleks. The Doctor and Bowman realise that the Daleks will now ambush the retreating convoy. They try to warn them but before they can the Daleks arrive, forcing the convoy to surrender and destroying its flagship as a warning to the other ships.

Furious at the loss of Stella and her home world, the crew of the Wayfarer decide to interrogate the captured Dalek. With the Doctor's reluctant help they disarm it, and then Koral uses its claws to open the casing. They then remove the creature inside and torture it, despite the Doctor's protests. Eventually they give up when the Dalek tells them nothing. After they've left the cargo hold, however, the Doctor returns and reveals to the dying Dalek who he is. The Dalek, amongst its predictable ranting, lets slip that the Daleks plan to 'eliminate all humanity from its very beginnings!' Eventually the Dalek dies, and the Doctor works out what it meant.

He reveals to the crew that the Daleks must be looking for the Arkheon Threshold, a schism in time and space which, if opened, will give the Daleks access to the Time Vortex. Deciding that the Doctor is telling the truth, Bowman orders the crew to head for the remains of the planet Arkheon, which had been destroyed at the start of the war.

When they arrive they find that the planet has been split in two, with the surviving half still retaining a breathable atmosphere. The Wayfarer lands and the Doctor and the crew disembark. Whilst looking round the devastated landscape they encounter dozens of mutated Arkheonites, devolved by the radiation fallout. They chase the crew to the very edge of the planet, where they are captured by Daleks. After destroying their weapons the Daleks force the Doctor and the crew onto a lift, which descends down the side of the planet towards they core. Here the Doctor discovers that the Daleks, far from searching for Arkheon, have been on the planet for years. They have constructed a huge underground base where thousands of human prisoners from Auros are mining the core, looking for the Threshold. The base also contains experimentation labs, and the largest Dalek Prison outside of Skaro.

The Doctor and the crew are taken into the base where they are scanned for 'suitability'. Scrum is found to be of marginal use. Cuttin' Edge and Koral are both sentenced to work in the mines. When Bowman is scanned it is discovered that he is in fact 'Space Major Jon Bowman', the designer of Earth's defence system and high on the Dalek's list of wanted people, causing the commander to be alerted. Upon being told by the Command Dalek that Bowman will be taken for brain excoriation, which will kill him, Koral, who is secretly in love with Bowman, lashes out at the nearest Dalek. In retaliation the Daleks kill Scrum, the weakest member of the group. As the Daleks prepare to take Bowman away the Doctor stops them and whispers something to the Command Dalek. The Command Dalek, suddenly terrified, orders two of its minions to scan the Doctor. They immediately identity him and prepare to exterminate him. The Doctor persuades them to interrogate him first, however. News of the Doctor's capture is sent to the Supreme Dalek on Skaro, who sends the Primary Intelligence Unit, led by the Dalek Inquisitor General, to interrogate the Doctor.

Cuttin' Edge and Koral are sent to work in the mines, replacing a group that is exterminated for being too slow. The Doctor is placed in the same cell as Bowman, who reveals to him that the Dalek Inquisitor General, called 'Dalek X' by the Earth authorities, is second in command to the Supreme Dalek and is described as being 'the Devil in Dalek form'. Dalek X accepts his Earth designation to cause fear. Dalek X arrives at Arkeon aboard the Exterminator, the Dalek Empire's most advanced ship, containing 500 Daleks and accompanied by a small fleet of Dalek saucers. Upon arrival Dalek X takes over command of the base, and exterminates one of its mining Daleks for failing to meet its target. He then orders that every hour the weakest group of workers will be exterminated. Soon after the Doctor is brought to the interrogation room, where Dalek X measures the Doctor's capacity for physical pain using a mind probe, simply out of curiosity. Dalek X reveals he gave the order to destroy the Auros Ship. After an unknown length of time in pain the Doctor is released from the mind probe, and shown around the base by Dalek X. Meanwhile, the Wayfarer is destroyed, and Bowman is taken to have his brain removed.

Dalek X reveals to the Doctor that once the planetary core has been extracted, the Daleks will locate the Threshold using a Large Chronon Collider. They will then open it, access the time vortex and defeat the Time Lords. There is a chance that the collider won't work properly, however. To ensure success the Daleks need a control element; the Doctor's TARDIS. The Doctor refuse to co-operate, but the Daleks threaten to exterminate a woman and her daughter from Cuttin' Edge's and Koral's work force if he doesn't comply. Eventually, the Doctor agrees to help, but under the condition that Cuttin' Edge, Koral and Bowman come with them to help him operate the TARDIS. The Daleks agree and Bowman is released, just before he is about to be killed. The Doctor tries to have the Woman and her daughter taken as well, but the Daleks refuse.

The Exterminator and its escort fleet head for Hurala, with the Doctor, the surviving Wayfarer crew members and the Dalek Temporal Research Team on board. When they reach the TARDIS the Doctor claims to have lost the Key, saying it is in the room he was locked up in at the Dalek Base. As they head for it, Cuttin' Edge recognises the identification symbol on one of the Daleks. It is the same one that killed Scrum. He lashes out at it, knocking it down the steps, and is exterminated by Dalek X, though he pulls another Dalek into the ray, destroying it. The Doctor, Koral and Bowman use the distraction to escape into a maintenance duct.

After escaping the Doctor reveals his plan. There is still enough astronic energy fuel on the planet to cause a huge explosion. If they can detonate it they can destroy Dalek X, the Temporal Research Team and the orbiting Dalek fleet. They make their way to a silo that still contains fuel, and the Doctor starts to rig it to explode. Dalek X, enraged by the Doctor's escape, catches up with them and prepares to exterminate the Doctor. Dalek X is attacked by Koral and Bowman, who eventually disable it and push it over the edge of the gantry they are standing on. The Doctor is nearly finished, but realises that he can't stop the safety override by remote control. Someone will have to stay behind and hold the manual override lever down until the silo reaches critical. Bowman volunteers to stay behind, refusing to leave despite protests from Koral. Eventually he knocks out the protesting Koral so that the Doctor can take her back to the TARDIS and safety. The Doctor and Koral make it into the TARDIS just as the Daleks arrive. In the silo Bowman holds the lever down as the Daleks approach, and as the whole base beings to shake the Daleks retreat. Finally the silo reaches critical mass and Bowman prepares to face death. He is saved at the last second by the Doctor, however, who materialises the TARDIS on the gantry. Bowman leaps into the TARDIS just as the Command Dalek tries to exterminate him. A second later the silo explodes, killing every Dalek on Hurala, as well as destroying the Exterminator and its escort fleet.

Back on Earth Bowman and Koral report to the Earth authorities. They learn that the Dalek fleet is in complete disarray thanks to them, and a task force is preparing to attack the Dalek base on Arkheon and release the prisoners. The Doctor leaves as Bowman and Koral prepare to go and meet Bowman's parents.

The Doctor travels to Hurala, which has been sealed off for 5,000 years due to radiation fallout. There he finds Dalek X, badly damaged but still alive at the bottom of a pit. The Doctor informs it that Arkeon has been taken by the Earth forces, the Daleks are in full retreat on all fronts and that he has sealed off the Threshold. The radiation will help Dalek X keep alive, but by the time the Quarantine is over Dalek X will be dead. Regardless of the Doctor's revelations, Dalek X rants that the Daleks are never defeated. The Doctor replies that the Daleks are always defeated, because they can never accept that every other form of life in the Universe is better than the Daleks. To prove this the Doctor points out that there is no form of life in the Universe that would volunteer to be a Dalek. As the Doctor prepares to leave Dalek X vows to hunt him down. The Doctor responds by simply stating that he'll be waiting. The Doctor then finally departs Hurala, leaving Dalek X trapped on the planet, alone.

== Audiobook ==
Prisoner of the Daleks
- Author: Trevor Baxendale
- Audio read by: Nicholas Briggs
- Series: Doctor Who (Tenth Doctor)
- Publisher: BBC Audio
- Publication date: 3 September 2009
- Media type: Audiobook; Audio CD
- ISBN: 978-1-4084-2657-9
- Followed by: The Krillitane Storm

An unabridged audiobook was released on 3 September 2009, read by Nicholas Briggs, the voice of the Daleks. He uses his voice modulator to create the effect of the Daleks whenever he speaks their dialogue.

== See also ==
- Whoniverse
