= Apollo 23 =

Apollo 23 may refer to:

- Apollo 23 (novel), part of the New Series Adventures series relating to the long-running BBC science fiction television series, Doctor Who
- Fictional launchpad explosion in For All Mankind (TV series)
