= Shining Darkness =

2008 novel by Mark Michalowski

- Author: Mark Michalowski
- Series: Doctor Who book: New Series Adventures
- Release number: 27
- Subject: Featuring: Tenth Doctor; Donna Noble
- Set in: Period between "Partners in Crime" and "Turn Left"
- Publisher: BBC Books
- Publication date: 4 September 2008
- ISBN: 1-84607-557-2
- Preceded by: The Doctor Trap
- Followed by: The Story of Martha

Shining Darkness is a BBC Books original novel written by Mark Michalowski and based on the long-running science fiction television series Doctor Who. It features the Tenth Doctor and Donna Noble. It was published on 4 September 2008, alongside Ghosts of India and The Doctor Trap.

== Audiobook ==
An abridged audiobook was released on 12 March 2009, read by Debbie Chazen who played Foon Van Hoff in the episode "Voyage of the Damned".

== See also ==
- Whoniverse
