= Rose Tyler =

Fictional character from Doctor Who

- Doctor Who character
- Billie Piper as Rose Tyler
- First appearance: "Rose" (2005)
- Created by: Russell T Davies
- Portrayed by: Billie Piper; Julia Joyce (young)
- Duration: 2005–2006, 2008, 2010, 2025

In-universe information
- Full name: Rose Marion Tyler
- Occupation: Shop assistant (formerly)
- Affiliation: Ninth Doctor; Tenth Doctor
- Family: Jackie Tyler (mother); Pete Tyler (father); Tony Tyler (half-brother)
- Significant others: Meta-Crisis Doctor; Mickey Smith (ex-boyfriend)
- Origin: Peckham, London, England
- Home era: Early 21st century

Rose Marion Tyler is a fictional character in the British science fiction television series Doctor Who. She was created by series producer Russell T Davies and portrayed by Billie Piper. With the revival of Doctor Who in 2005, Rose was introduced as a new travelling companion of the series protagonist, the Doctor, in his ninth and tenth incarnations. The companion character was key in the first series to introduce new viewers to the mythos of Doctor Who, which had not aired regularly since 1989. Rose became the viewers' eyes into the new world of the series from the companion's perspective. Piper received top billing alongside Christopher Eccleston and David Tennant for the duration of her time as a regular cast member. The character was a series regular for all of Series 1 (2005) and 2 (2006). Piper later reprised the role in a supporting capacity in Series 4 (2008) and the New Year's special "The End of Time" (2010). Piper further played a sentient weapon called the Moment, which utilises Rose's image, in the 50th anniversary special "The Day of the Doctor" (2013). Piper would return to the series once again in the Series 15 finale "The Reality War" (2025), where the Fifteenth Doctor regenerates into an unknown character resembling Rose.

In the series' narrative, Rose is introduced in the eponymous series one premiere as a teenage working class shop assistant from London, alongside her own supporting cast in the form of her mother Jackie Tyler (Camille Coduri) and her boyfriend Mickey Smith (Noel Clarke). Over the course of the first series, Rose's human actions and responses contrast with the Doctor's colder alien perspectives. Rose grows increasingly trusting of the Doctor and comes to realise she has fallen in love with him. He comes to value and depend on her and sacrifices his Ninth incarnation for her. Rose forms a similar bond with the new Doctor, but the two appear to be forever separated in the series two finale, although Rose's temporary return in the fourth series gives her relationship with the Doctor a resolution.

In promoting the series, both Piper and Eccleston stressed Rose's heroic characteristics, whilst Davies highlighted her down-to-earth qualities and quintessential "British-ness". Critical reaction noted that the character was more developed, independent and equal to the Doctor than previous companions had been, whilst the character's overall role in the narrative of the first two series was praised. However, the reaction to the character's 2008 return was more mixed. Piper won numerous awards for her portrayal of Rose —including two National Television Awards —and since her initial role in the series, the character has ranked highly in numerous 'best companion' polls. After leaving as a series regular, Piper experienced success in other high-profile roles as an actress, partly attributed to her performances in Doctor Who.

== Appearances ==
=== Television ===
Rose is introduced in the eponymous premiere episode, "Rose", of the 2005 series. She is saved from an Auton attack by the mysterious Time Lord the Doctor (Christopher Eccleston) and assists him in preventing an invasion of Earth. Subsequently, the Doctor invites Rose to be his travelling companion, taking her to the end of the world and tampering her mobile so she can remain in contact with her mother Jackie (Camille Coduri), and boyfriend Mickey Smith (Noel Clarke) while time-travelling in "The End of the World". In their travels through time and space, Rose learns the importance of not tampering with history, when in "Father's Day", she attempts to save the life of her father Pete Tyler (Shaun Dingwall), who had died when she was a baby. Throughout their journeys, she and the Doctor are haunted by two mysterious recurring words: "Bad Wolf". Rose, the Doctor, and new companion Captain Jack Harkness (John Barrowman) come to understand the meaning of this phrase in "Bad Wolf" when they encounter an unstoppable army of Daleks on the space station Satellite 5, which first appeared in "The Long Game".

To return to the Doctor after he sends her home to Earth in the series finale "The Parting of the Ways", Rose tears open the console of the Doctor's time machine, the TARDIS, and becomes suffused with the power of the time vortex. Returning, she uses her power over the infinity of time and space to spread the words "Bad Wolf" over its entirety, thus saving the universe from the Dalek invasion. Rose resurrects Jack, who was killed by the Daleks, and destroys the Dalek fleet before the Doctor drains the energy out of her to save her life from its harmful effects. Rose is horrified as the Doctor appears to die and regenerates into a new man (David Tennant), who proceeds to take the TARDIS and a terrified Rose to Earth, abandoning Jack on Satellite 5.

The new Doctor and Rose arrive on Earth on Christmas Day, where he passes out from the strain of regeneration in the midst of a Sycorax invasion in the 2005 Christmas special "The Christmas Invasion". Having woken up and saved Earth, the Doctor enjoys Christmas dinner with Rose before they travel to parts unknown. Over the second series (2006), Rose and the Doctor grow increasingly close to one another. After defeating a werewolf in "Tooth and Claw", they are knighted by Queen Victoria (Pauline Collins), who banishes them as potential threats to the Empire whilst setting up the Torchwood Institute, which aims to track alien activity on Earth, including the Doctor's. Their relationship proves a source of tension once Mickey joins the pair in their travels, at the suggestion of the Doctor's former companion Sarah Jane Smith (Elisabeth Sladen) in "School Reunion". Whilst stranded in a parallel universe in "Rise of the Cybermen", Rose meets a rich, entrepreneur version of her father Pete who never died.

Companion Mickey decides to stay behind on this world to battle Cybermen as he no longer wants to feel like a spare part at the end of "The Age of Steel", and also to be with his grandmother, who never died on the parallel world. Alone with the Doctor again, Rose faces the Beast (Gabriel Woolf) in the two-part story "The Impossible Planet" and "The Satan Pit", who prophesies that Rose will soon die in battle. This day comes when, in "Army of Ghosts", the Torchwood Institute's director Yvonne Hartman (Tracy-Ann Oberman) unintentionally allows the Cybermen army and Dalek Cult of Skaro into Rose's reality, where they begin a war. In the series finale "Doomsday", while sealing the Cybermen and Daleks back into the void through which they came, Rose is transported to the parallel universe by Pete, to save her from also being pulled into the void.

Rose becomes trapped in the parallel universe with Jackie and the alternate universe Pete as the walls between universes seal; she is subsequently presumed dead in her own universe after disappearing. Months later, the Doctor is able to transmit Rose a goodbye message. She reveals she now works for that universe's Torchwood and confesses her love for him. Before he can reply, their connection is lost.

In the spin-off series Torchwood (2006–2011), the audience learns that Rose's act of resurrecting Jack cursed him with being unable to die. Her absence and the Doctor's pained estrangement from her proves a point of contention for the Doctor's series 3 (2007) companion Martha Jones (Freema Agyeman); when Martha protects the Doctor, living as a human without his memories, it is still Rose that he dreams of. When the Doctor is reunited with Donna Noble (Catherine Tate) in the show's fourth series (2008) during "Partners in Crime", Rose mysteriously begins to appear in the Doctor's life—first seen only by Donna, and later in silent video messages which the Doctor is oblivious to.

In "Turn Left", when a "Time Beetle" creates an alternate universe in which Donna never meets the Doctor and the Doctor dies, Rose travels from her parallel world to this world, working alongside the organisation UNIT to send Donna back in time, and make Donna's younger self turn left at a junction and not right. Rose tells Donna to say two words to the Doctor; "Bad Wolf". The Doctor concludes this is a sign that the universe, and reality itself, is under threat. Later, in the midst of Davros' (Julian Bleach) plot to obliterate existence, Rose unites with the Doctor and his companions Donna, Martha, Jack and Sarah Jane to make a stand against him and his army of Daleks. In the midst of the battle, a part-human Doctor (the Meta-Crisis Doctor) is created and destroys the Daleks. The Doctor returns Rose to the parallel universe along with Jackie and the Meta-Crisis Doctor. Rose challenges the Doctor to say the words he did not say to her during their previous farewell. The Doctor does not answer, but the Meta-Crisis Doctor whispers the words in her ear, and Rose kisses him. The Doctor retreats, leaving Rose behind to live with the Meta-Crisis Doctor. In the closing scenes of "The End of Time" (2010), just prior to his regeneration, the Doctor travels to Rose's housing estate in the first minutes of 2005. He speaks to her from the shadows, asking her what year it is. She tells him it is 1 January 2005. The Doctor promises her that she will have a really great year.

Piper returned for the show's 50th-anniversary episode "The Day of the Doctor" (2013) as the interface of a sentient weapon of mass destruction known as 'the Moment'. The War Doctor (John Hurt) intends to end the raging Time War by using the Moment to destroy both the Daleks and the Time Lords. Using Rose's image, chosen for her future significance to the Doctor, the Moment attempts to persuade him to seek an alternative course of action by showing him how the decision will affect his future.

In the 2023 60th Anniversary special "The Star Beast" Donna's daughter Rose Noble chose the name Rose after her transition, influenced from the shared subconscious memories of her mother's time with The Doctor.

In the special "The Giggle" the Fifteenth Doctor listed Rose to the Fourteenth Doctor as one of many people they "lost" during their lifetimes, with the Fifteenth openly stated he loved her.

Piper returned again in "The Reality War" in 2025, when the Fifteenth Doctor regenerated into an incarnation resembling Rose Tyler. However, she was not credited as the Doctor, and the nature of her role has yet to be revealed.

=== Literature ===
Rose is featured in the first twelve Doctor Who New Series Adventures novels, which expand on her characterisation. The first three of these novels—The Clockwise Man, The Monsters Inside and Winner Takes All—were published in May 2005 and feature solely the Ninth Doctor and Rose. The Monsters Inside depicts Rose's first visit to an alien planet, her travels previously having been confined to Earth and orbiting space stations. Rose mentions this visit to the planet Justicia in the first series television episode "Boom Town", aired on 4 June 2005. The second batch of Ninth Doctor novels —comprising The Deviant Strain, Only Human and The Stealers of Dreams—were released in September 2005 and expand on the Doctor and Rose's travels with Jack Harkness. The novel Only Human mentions that Rose was engaged to a previous love interest before becoming involved with Mickey. The events of "Boom Town" are addressed in The Stealers of Dreams in which Jackie complains that Rose did not alert her to her recent visit to modern day Cardiff. The first three novels to feature Rose and the Tenth Doctor—The Stone Rose, The Feast of the Drowned and The Resurrection Casket—were released in April 2006 to coincide with the broadcast of the second television series. The Feast of the Drowned explores the context of Rose's shifting relationship with Jackie and Mickey in light of her frequent absences from Earth. Her relationship with a school friend, Keisha, is also explored; Rose is irritated to find out she and Mickey have become involved in her absence. The last three New Series Adventures novels to feature Rose —The Nightmare of Black Island, The Art of Destruction and The Price of Paradise—were published in September 2006. In addition to the regular range of novels, Rose is featured in the first Doctor Who Quick Reads Initiative novella, I am a Dalek, in which she and the Doctor must deal with a human-Dalek hybrid.

The Doctor Who Annual 2006, published in August 2005, gives further biographical information on Rose in an article written by the programme's chief writer and executive producer Russell T Davies, including the middle name "Marion", and information about her mother, school life and ex-boyfriends. The character also appears in short stories featured in the Doctor Who annuals for 2006 and 2007, in addition to an issue of the series' sanctioned companion magazine, Doctor Who Magazine. She has additionally been featured in comic book sequences which feature in the annuals, Doctor Who Magazine, and children's magazines Doctor Who Adventures and Doctor Who – Battles in Time. In one Doctor Who Magazine comic strip, "The Green-Eyed Monster", Rose is possessed by a creature that feeds on jealousy. In order to arouse enough jealousy to defeat this creature, the Tenth Doctor feigns a romance with Rose's mother, and sets up Mickey with a group of actors who pose as beautiful Amazonian girlfriends. The character also appears in a panel of Buffy the Vampire Slayer Season Eight's second story, "No Future for You".

=== Audio drama ===
Following the folding of AudioGO and Big Finish's acquisition of the new series license, Piper reprised her role as Rose in Doctor Who: The Tenth Doctor Adventures released in November 2017, with David Tennant reprising his role as the Tenth Doctor. Piper returned again for her own series: Rose Tyler: The Dimension Cannon, following Rose as she travels parallel worlds in search of the Doctor (set between Doomsday and her appearances in series four). The series began in September 2019 and ended with its third volume in September 2023.

On 15 February 2025, Big Finish announced the fourth series of The Ninth Doctor Adventures would reunite Piper with Christopher Eccleston as the Ninth Doctor. The twelve-part series began in August 2025.

== Development ==
=== Casting ===
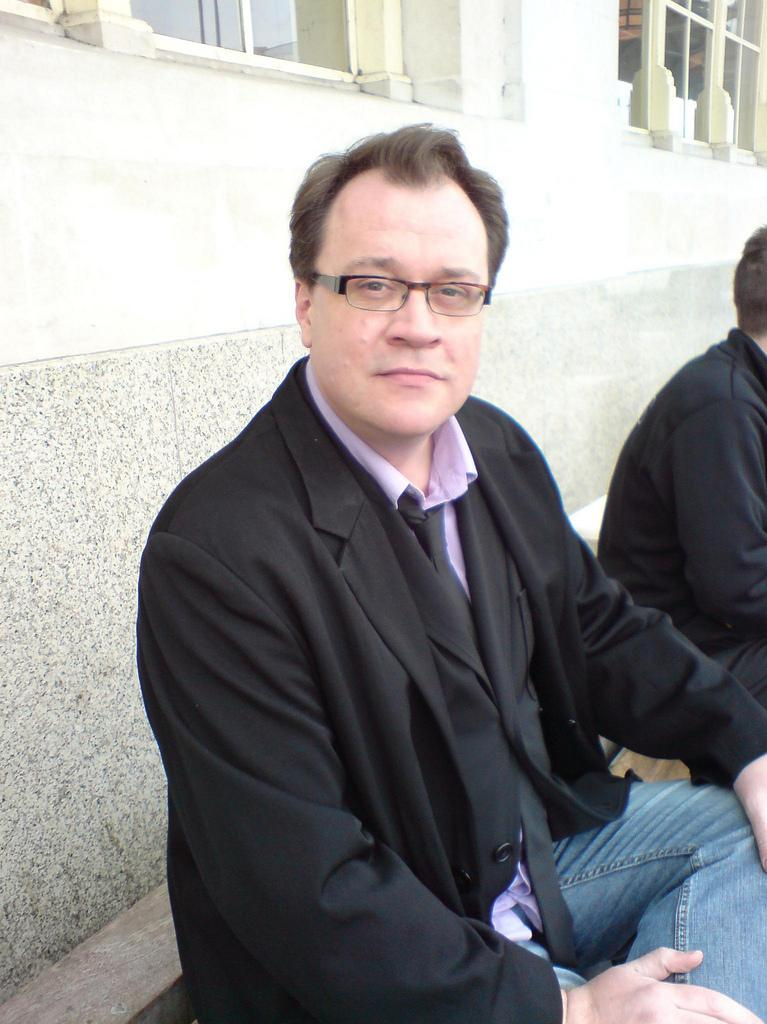
2005–10 executive producer Russell T Davies (pictured) deliberately recycled the names "Rose" and "Tyler" from names he had used in previous works.

Lead writer and executive producer Russell T Davies chose the name Rose because he considered it a "good luck charm" after he used it for Lesley Sharp's character in Bob & Rose. His desire to make the show "essentially British" was another justification: he considered Rose to be "the most British name in the world" and feminine enough to subvert a recent trend of female companions having "boyish" names, such as Peri, Benny, Charley, and Ace. Davies also frequently uses the surname "Tyler" in his work —previous characters he created with the surname include Ruth Tyler in Revelations (1994), Vince Tyler in Queer as Folk (1999), and Johnny Tyler in The Second Coming (2003) —due to his affection for how the surname is spelled and pronounced. Davies also used the surname "Tyler" in his Doctor Who New Adventures book "Damaged Goods". The casting of Piper as Rose was announced by the BBC on 24 May 2004. Head of Drama for BBC Wales Julie Gardner commented that the former pop star "fits the bill perfectly" as a "unique, dynamic partner for Christopher Eccleston". Whilst some fans —including a representative of the Doctor Who Appreciation Society —were enthusiastic about the announcement, others felt it was "publicity stunt" casting and questioned Piper's acting credentials. One of the factors that influenced Piper's acceptance of the role was that she was able to relate the character of Rose to her own experiences as a teenager.

The British media regularly released conflicting reports about how long Piper would stay with the programme. In March 2006, it was suggested that she would continue on Doctor Who into its third series in 2007. However, the BBC announced on 15 June 2006 that Piper was to depart in the final episode of the second series, "Doomsday". Her decision to leave had been taken a year previously. Following "Doomsday", Piper as Rose was greenlit to be the star of the spin-off series Rose Tyler: Earth Defence, set in her parallel universe and to air as a bank holiday special, but Davies deemed the concept "a spin-off too far" after Torchwood and The Sarah Jane Adventures. Piper's eventual return during series four was planned during filming of the second series; in January 2006, she made a pact promising to return to film several more episodes. Davies and Piper cited her commitment to other projects—specifically, her roles as Belle de Jour in Secret Diary of a Call Girl, the lead character in the BBC adaptations of Philip Pullman's Sally Lockhart quartet, and Fanny Price in the ITV adaptation of Mansfield Park—as explanations behind her departure appearing permanent. Davies' successor as executive producer, Steven Moffat praised the creation and casting of the character in advance of the series' 50th anniversary in 2013. He stated that the character of Rose helped secure the return of the show by allowing "an audience who would not naturally have watched Doctor Who" to become invested in the show. Moffat suggested that during the first two years of the revival Doctor Who "was Billie Piper's show" and that this has given her an "iconic status" above other Doctor Who companions.

=== Characterisation ===
"I was very similar at 19. I wanted something to happen in life, I wanted a bit more. I wanted to find someone who could challenge my ideas. So I definitely tapped into that."

— Billie Piper on how her personal experience influenced her approach to the character.

Davies uses Rose as an introduction to the show's mythos and fantasy elements. He later underlined similarities between Rose and Gwen Cooper —the lead for Torchwood — describing both as "the ordinary person who stumbles into something extraordinary and finds herself their equal." Like her successor Martha, Rose is from London; Brett Mills from the University of East Anglia makes the assumption that this is because characters from the capital of the country are "relatable to all British people" because they are seen as "neutral". Rose is introduced alongside a supporting cast in the form of her boyfriend Mickey and mother Jackie which James Chapman cites as "evidence of Davies' attempt to create a social context for the companion". Davies states that the inclusion of these two characters was part of his desire to "make her real" and to "give her a life". He later stated that in giving Rose a mother, a boyfriend and a "sad story with her father" the character has "her own mythology, to match the Doctor." Lindy A. Orthia observes that Rose, like the other companions in Davies's era of Doctor Who, is "drawn from a cosmopolitan vision" in her case because of her class background. Orthia contends that whilst working-class companions had featured previously in the show "none were unskilled workers nor chronically under- or unemployed like Rose, Jackie and Donna". Looking back at the two characters, Davies felt Jackie to be someone who is "holding Rose back" right from the first episode due to her suggestions her daughter be content with menial employment. Piper states that this causes Rose to resent her mum somewhat, although she loves her.

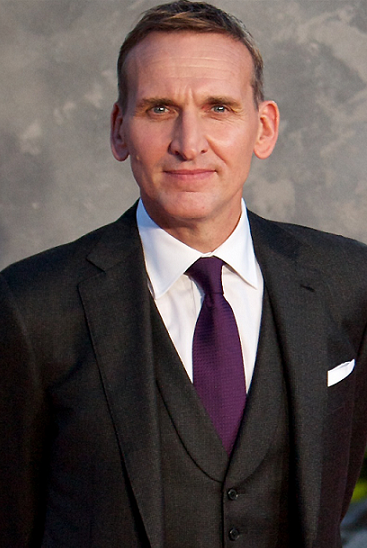
Christopher Eccleston felt that Rose was the Ninth Doctor's equal in the first series.

Kay McFadden of The Seattle Times felt Rose to resemble "the Bridget Jones type of Englishwoman, albeit a few pegs down the socioeconomic scale" waiting to be awakened "not by some Mark Darcy ... but by adventure incarnate." Piper stated that at the start of the series Rose is "looking for something to happen" and that once the Doctor arrives she becomes "ruthless" in her decision to "completely drop her life as she knows it." At a media preview of the series she characterised Rose as being "positive, ambitious and full of conviction and confidence." She also felt that Rose is "a good character to relate to or aspire to." In a 2013 retrospective on her time on Doctor Who Piper stated Rose's feminine characteristics contributed to her being a balanced representation of a female character. She felt that Rose as a character could be both "strong-willed and vulnerable" and ventured that her emotional response made her more interesting than "a female character endlessly striving towards perfection". Eccleston, who played the Ninth Doctor described the character as a "heroine" who "teaches [the Doctor] huge emotional lessons". In an episode of Doctor Who Confidential he expanded on this, describing her as "the Doctor's equal in every way" except for the fact she lacks his scientific knowledge. He felt that the relationship between the two characters was "love at first sight" although in a more mysterious fashion than a conventional love affair. Davies summarised the relationship between the two characters as "soul mates" who "understand and complement each other".

Lynette Porter, in her book Tarnished Heroes, Charming Villains and Modern Monsters: Science Fiction in Shades of Gray on 21st Century Television observed that Rose's role "humanises the Doctor and makes him less alien, not only to other characters, but to the audience". In the first series finale, Rose takes on deadly energies to save the Doctor and planet Earth. Script editor Helen Raynor felt the episode gave Rose a chance to "again be the Doctor's equal" and "to finally match him with a gesture that is so noble, and strong, and heroic, and clever". Davies describes Rose in the context of this scene and the whole of the first series as being "braver than brave and more loyal than anyone else in the universe". The Doctor repays her loyalty by sacrificing his ninth incarnation in turn to save her; Davies states unequivocally that "he gives his life for her". Elements of Rose's characterisation in the first series were originally different. Paul Abbott was scheduled to write an episode which would have revealed that the Doctor manipulated Rose's entire life to mould her into an ideal companion. Davies wrote the episode "Boom Town" to replace it when Abbott realised he was too busy to work on the script.

=== With the Tenth Doctor ===
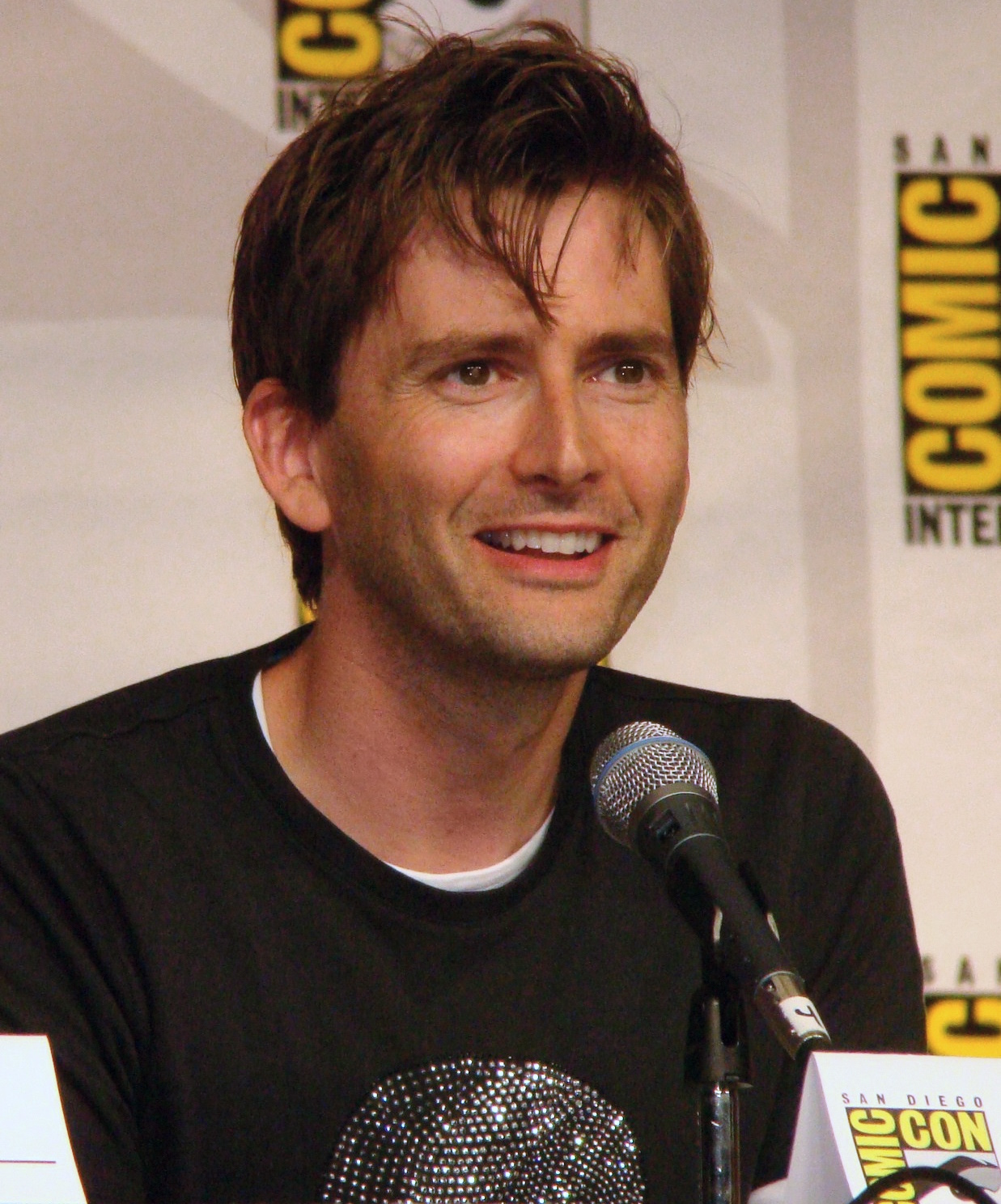
The second series explored new elements of the relationship between Rose and David Tennant's Doctor.

In an interview with SFX producer Phil Collinson stated that after the Doctor regenerates the "initial dynamic changes because [Rose] has to learn to trust him again". Piper added that as the Doctor is incapacitated Rose consequently feels "unloved", "isolated" and "like she's lost her best friend". Rose relies on her observations of the Doctor in his absence and tries to mimic his actions. Collinson felt it was important to resolve any mistrust between the pair by the end of the Christmas Special, as the public had responded well to Rose and the Doctor's friendship previously. Davies had scripted dialogue in "The Christmas Invasion" explaining the newly regenerated Doctor's estuary English accent by stating he had imprinted on Rose and adopted her way of speaking. However, due to time constraints, this sequence was not filmed. Discussing how Rose had developed by the second series, Piper described her as having "come on in leaps and bounds" and stated she is now "a lot more proactive." She felt that there is a "different kind of energy" between Rose and the Tenth Doctor, whilst Tennant remarked that the audience would get to see the Doctor-companion relationship "developing and becoming something that it maybe hasn't before." Piper stated that with the Tenth Doctor, Rose is "more tetchy and more possessive" over him as "she feels like she's lost him once and doesn't want to lose him again". She cited Rose's "catfight" with former companion Sarah Jane Smith in "School Reunion" as evidence of this. Discussing the possibility of Rose and the Tenth Doctor becoming more romantically involved Piper stated "You want it to happen, but at the same time you don't want it to happen". Tennant likened the dynamic between the pair to that of Dana Scully (Gillian Anderson) and Fox Mulder (David Duchovny) in The X-Files. Both Tennant and Piper agreed that the expectation of the relationship is more exciting than having it realised. To add to the tragedy of their separation, Davies scripted the series two story arc so that Rose and the Doctor would be indirectly responsible for their separation. "It's deliberate when that happens [the Doctor and Rose's arrogance]", said Davies, "and they do pay the price. In "Tooth and Claw", they set up the very thing — Torchwood — that separates them in the end. It's sort of their own fault." Though Davies left the Doctor's response to Rose's declaration of love in "Doomsday" unstated, Gardner felt strongly that the character reciprocated her feelings. On the commentary for the episode, she stated that she would "confirm to the world" that he was going to "say it back."

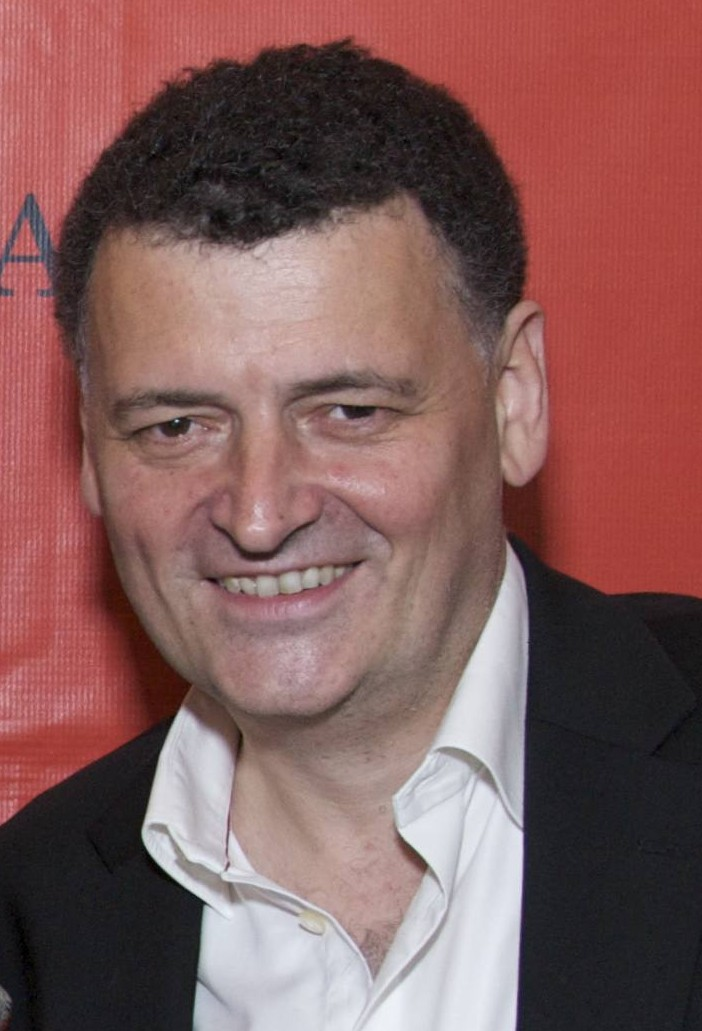
Davies' successor Steven Moffat did not wish to add to Rose's character arc when including Piper in a 2013 special, re-introducing her godlike, "Bad Wolf" persona instead.

Davies created the expectation of Rose's return in the fourth series by mentioning her in dialogue and featuring Piper in cameo appearances in "Partners in Crime", "The Poison Sky", and "Midnight". Speaking on how Rose's character had changed between her appearances, Davies described the fourth series Rose as "tougher, more independent, and [she] might, at times, seem a little harder". Piper stated she rewatched her earlier episodes to remember how the character spoke and acted as she felt she had "been playing posh birds" since she left the programme and by contrast "Rose is a bit of a chav". Rose is re-united with the Doctor near the climax of "The Stolen Earth". Director Graeme Harper insisted that the scene appear "mystical" because the characters' reunion was "the most magical moment" in the entire episode and Ernie Vincze, the Director of Photography for the show, compared the scene's feeling to the 1980s science-fiction film Blade Runner. Davies characterised the reunion between Rose and the Doctor as "the biggest romance [the viewer] has ever seen" and joked that seminal films such as Gone with the Wind should have ended with a Dalek shooting the male lead. He had difficulty splitting up the characters for a second time for the necessity of the plot. He felt that "Rose has to be stupid to fall in love with Doctor #2" because "she's doing what the plot demands, not what she'd demand". At one stage he considered giving an explanation that Rose's dimension hopping and the Dalek's meddling with reality had contaminated her with "voidstuff" and that she would die if she stayed in her original universe. In the final episode, it is enough for her to stay that the human Doctor needs her and is able to reciprocate her love. Porter felt that the climax of "Journey's End" indicated that "Rose's role as a sidekick has been completed" as she has a second Doctor to humanise, one who she can be equals with.

=== Reprisals ===
Though Davies had intended the serial to end with the Tenth Doctor visiting his former companions, he struggled with how to include Rose. An initial idea was for Rose to appear with the Meta-Crisis Doctor and their family in the parallel universe, where both would sense the original Tenth Doctor regenerating. However, Davies felt this would raise too many questions about their lives in the parallel universe. Davies's successor as executive producer, Steven Moffat, felt that Davies ended Rose's story in the perfect way by choosing to take it back to the beginning of her acquaintance with the Doctor. Piper's return for Doctor Who's 50th anniversary episode was confirmed in March 2013. Moffat wished to include Piper in the episode because he felt that she symbolised the rebirth of Doctor Who. As he did not feel comfortable adding to Davies's story arc, he chose to re-introduce her Bad Wolf persona instead. During the episode Piper's character has dialogue solely with John Hurt's War Doctor, and is unseen by the other characters, including the Tenth Doctor. Reviewers noted similarities between the characterisation of Bad Wolf Rose and that of a plot device used by Charles Dickens in his 1843 novella A Christmas Carol. Ted B. Kissell, a journalist for The Atlantic likened the War Doctor to Ebenezer Scrooge and dubbed Rose the "Ghost of Doctors Yet to Come".

== Reception ==
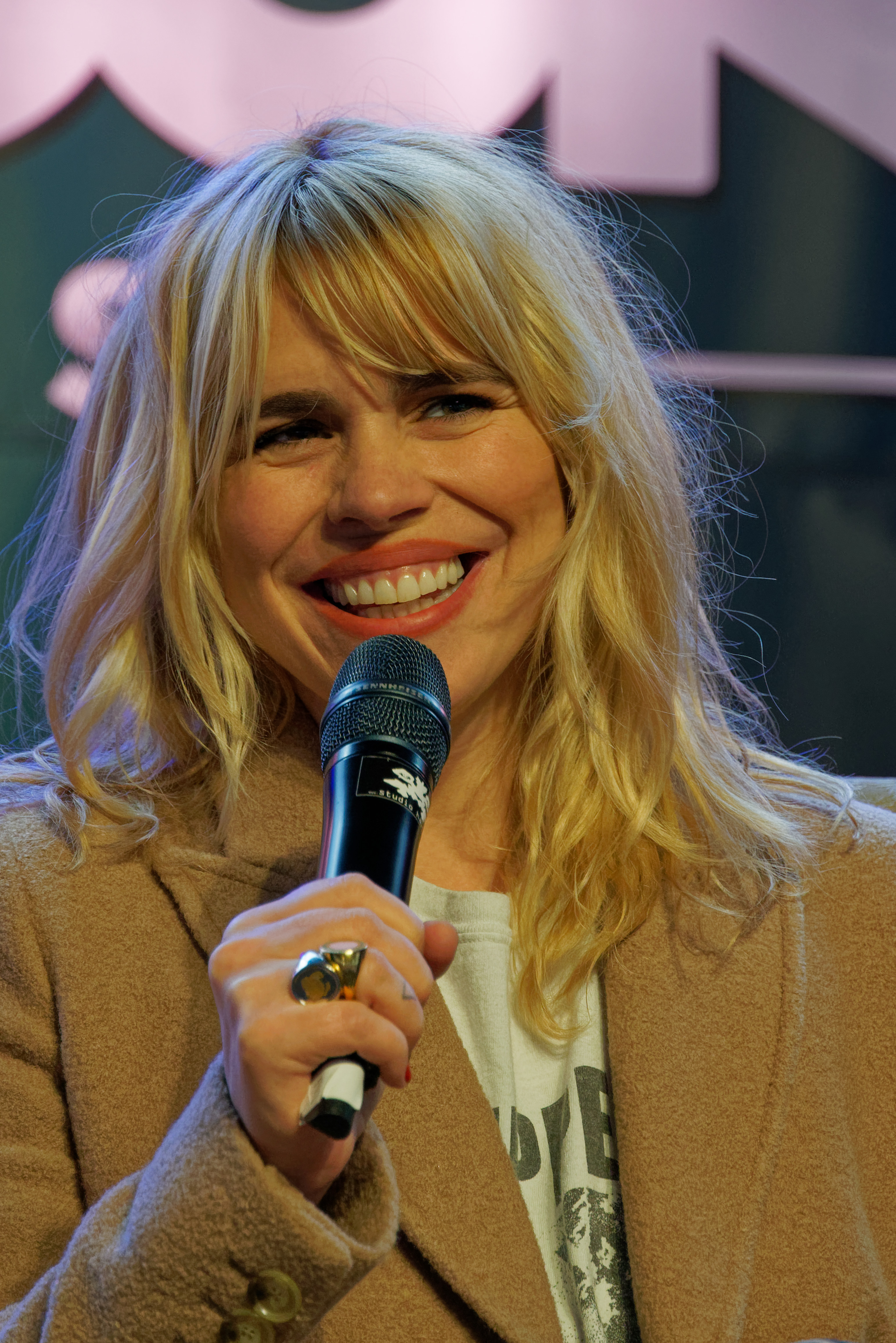
Billie Piper received praise for her role as Rose.

After a preview of the first series, The Guardian's Owen Gibson described Rose as "newly empowered" and a "go-getting teen in the Buffy the Vampire Slayer mould." Ahead of the series premiere on Australian Network ABC The Sydney Morning Herald's Robin Oliver described Rose's role in the series as being "more the Doctor's equal than previous companions" and that this was "no mean achievement against Eccleston's acting skills." Seventh Doctor actor Sylvester McCoy opined that Piper was "wonderful in the role" and the relationship between her and the Doctor was "quite extraordinary". Porter suggests in her analysis of Rose that the romance between her and the Doctor widened the demographic appeal of the series. She claims that the love story "simmers enough below the surface that adults, especially women who find Time-Lords sexy, watched the series for Rose's interplay with the Doctor". In their book Who is the Doctor?, Graeme Burk and Robert Smith described the climactic kiss between the Ninth Doctor and Rose in "The Parting of the Ways" as being something "we all secretly wanted, even though it ultimately killed him". Peter Davison, who portrayed the Fifth Doctor, also felt that allowing the Doctor and his companion to have sexual tension ultimately allowed for more rounded characterisation. He believed that Rose was the first example of the production team creating a well-written companion.

Burk and Smith found the pairing of the Doctor and Rose to be unlikable in the episode "Tooth and Claw" because they were "acting like smug idiots". However, they noted that "fortunately there are consequences: the season arc gets kicked off as a direct result of the Doctor and Rose being so irritating". Harry Venning of The Stage commented that the eventual parting scene between Rose and the Doctor in "Doomsday" was "beautifully written and movingly played," with "not a dry eye in the universe". Burk and Smith singled out Piper's performance in the episode for special praise stating she "is astonishing at capturing the reality of someone whose world suddenly, finally collapses." Remarking on Piper's departure, Dek Hogan of Digital Spy stated that "Billie Piper's energy has undoubtedly been one of the reasons that this revival has been so successful and the difficult third series will be so much more so without her." Stephen Brook of The Guardian commented that "the departure of the much-loved Rose ... was brilliantly handled and completely unexpected."

Stephen James Walker, a writer of reference works on Doctor Who, gave an unfavourable review to Rose's return in "Turn Left" in his "unauthorised guide to Doctor Who's fourth series," Monsters Within. He thought that Billie Piper was "distinctly below par", citing her gaunt and malnourished appearance, new hairstyle, and slight lisp as reasons why her acting was not her finest. He criticised her role in the episode, stating it had been "far less well worked out" than Donna's. Ben Rawson-Jones of Digital Spy also noted a change in Piper's enunciation; he compared her accent to "[having] her mouth numbed with local anaesthetic". In Rawson-Jones' review of the series finale he notes that whilst having the Doctor and Rose 'cop off' would be divisive with the shows audience, "Davies wisely managed to please both parties" by pairing her off with a human Doctor instead. However, IGN's Travis Fickett reacted unfavourably towards Rose's return and her pairing with the part human Doctor. He thought that it undermined her "perfect send off" in "Doomsday" as she was on the sidelines for much of "Journey's End", and her ending up with the part human, part Time Lord Doctor "feels like an insult to the character". Io9's Charlie Jane Anders also reacted unfavourably to Rose returning and wrote "it was pretty clear that she was only there so she could get her pet faux-Doctor at the end."

Reviewers generally reacted positively to Piper's 2013 appearance in the 50th anniversary episode "The Day of the Doctor". Ben Lawrence of The Daily Telegraph called her performance as the "Bad Wolf" Rose "transfixing". Neela Debnath of The Independent praised the chemistry between Hurt and Piper and compared Piper's performance to Suranne Jones' portrayal of the TARDIS in "The Doctor's Wife" describing it as "slightly eccentric", "oddball" and "off-the-wall". Daniel Martin of The Guardian praised Steven Moffat's decision not to extend Rose Tyler's story or re-unite her with the Tenth Doctor. He called Piper "a true and unending legend of Doctor Who" and stated that "her wise rendition of the Bad Wolf avatar made a passable stab at the stealing of the show".

Geoff Boucher of the Los Angeles Times named Rose the ninth best sidekick of all time, referring to her as "the saucy and smart character who was key to the success of the Russell T Davies relaunch of Doctor Who in 2005". She was named the best Doctor Who companion by Digital Spy in 2011, who opined that she worked best alongside the Ninth Doctor. In 2006 she was voted best companion by readers of Doctor Who Magazine. In an online poll in late 2010 conducted by the Radio Times, with over 3,000 participants, Rose was again voted the most popular companion. She retained this position in a 2013 poll conducted ahead of Doctor Who's 50th anniversary, which had over 21,000 respondents, with 25.09% of the vote. In a 2012 poll conducted by BBC America with over 200,000 participants, Rose was voted "The Greatest Woman of Doctor Who." Both The Daily Telegraph's Gavin Fuller and Daniel Martin of The Guardian rated her as the second-best female companion behind Sarah Jane Smith. In 2012 Will Salmon of SFX magazine listed Rose's original exit as the greatest companion departure in the history of Doctor Who as he felt it "impossible not to be moved by the sudden severance of their relationship". In 2014 Radio Times organized the most massive online (over 2 million respondents) poll which featured every companion since 1963, beating the main competitors Jack Harkness and River Song, Rose was crowned "Companion Champion".

At the 2005 National Television Awards, Billie Piper won the "Most Popular Actress" award for her role as Rose. In the BBC Online "Best of Drama" poll in 2005 Piper won the Best Actress category with 59.76% of the vote. She was also voted the Most Desirable Star with 26.47%. In January 2006 she was awarded the Breakthrough Award for Rising British Talent at The South Bank Show Awards. Piper again won the Most Popular Actress category at the 2006 National Television Awards for her work on the second series of Doctor Who. In September 2006, Piper was named Best Actress at the TV Quick and TV Choice Awards. Radio Times's Tom Cole discussed the importance of Doctor Who in boosting Piper's career in an article on how former Doctor Who actors can now expect more than "a life of signing autographs at provincial sci-fi conventions." He notes that Piper's portrayal of Rose "firmly cemented her credentials as an actress" and cited the variety of roles she had taken on since leaving the show as proof that "as far as post-Who careers go, they don't get much healthier than Billie's."
