= The Blood Cell =

2014 novel by James Goss

- Author: James Goss
- Series: Doctor Who book: New Series Adventures
- Release number: 52
- Subject: Featuring: Twelfth Doctor; Clara Oswald
- Set in: Period between "Listen" and "In the Forest of the Night"
- Publisher: BBC Books
- Publication date: 11 September 2014
- Pages: 256
- ISBN: 978-1-84990-774-3
- Preceded by: Engines of War
- Followed by: Silhouette

The Blood Cell is a BBC Books original novel written by James Goss and based on the long-running British science fiction television series Doctor Who. It features the Twelfth Doctor and Clara Oswald. The book was released on 11 September 2014 along with Silhouette and The Crawling Terror.

== Reviews ==
The Blood Cell gained generally positive reviews, calling it an "effective chiller". Most of them commented the unusual way of narration from the first-person perspective of the administrator of the prison in which the book is set known as the Governor. More grim and darker tone is also noted. The interaction between the Doctor and the Governor is described as "a good mix and an interesting double act". Goss nailed the bantering love/hate relationship of the Doctor and Clara, capturing the bickering between the pair. Peter Capaldi's Doctor is pretty recognisable, the author captures his "ornery portrayal extremely well", and the Twelfth Doctor's intellect as well as his sarcastic side with the "lashings of the amusing fish-out-of-water Time Lord" is portrayed accurately. As for Clara, Goss "captured her quiet determination well" and was praised for "an absolute hold on the character, really getting inside her head and nailing her characterisation perfectly".

== Audiobook ==
The Blood Cell
- Author: James Goss
- Audio read by: Colin McFarlane
- Series: Doctor Who
- Subject: Featuring: Twelfth Doctor; Clara Oswald
- Publisher: BBC Audio
- Publication date: 13 November 2014
- Media type: Audiobook; Audio CD (5 Hours 56 Mins)
- ISBN: 978-1-910281-73-4

The audio addition to the book was released on 13 November 2014, read by Colin McFarlane who played General Austin Pierce in Torchwood: Children of Earth and guest starred in the Doctor Who episodes "Under the Lake" and "Before the Flood" as Moran. This was the first new series audio to be released since AudioGo went into administration in 2013.
