= Coldheart (novel) =

2000 novel by Trevor Baxendale

- Author: Trevor Baxendale
- Series: Doctor Who book: Eighth Doctor Adventures
- Release number: 33
- Subject: Featuring: Eighth Doctor; Fitz and Compassion
- Publisher: BBC Books
- Publication date: April 2000
- Pages: 277
- ISBN: 0-563-55595-5
- Preceded by: The Fall of Yquatine
- Followed by: The Space Age

Coldheart is a BBC Books original novel written by Trevor Baxendale and based on the long-running British science fiction television series Doctor Who. It features the Eighth Doctor, Fitz and Compassion.
