= New Series Adventures =

Series of novels based on the Doctor Who television series

The New Series Adventures are a series of novels relating to the long-running BBC science fiction television series, Doctor Who. The 'NSAs', as they are often referred to, are published by BBC Books, and are regularly published twice a year. Beginning with the Tenth Doctor, a series of 'Quick Reads' have also been available, published once a year. With exception to the Quick Reads, all of the NSAs have been published in hardcover to begin with, and have been reprinted in paperback for boxed collections that are exclusive to The Book People and Tesco. Some of the reprints amend pictures of the companion of the novel from the cover. Some of the hardback editions have also been reprinted to amend pictures of Rose.

== Publication history ==
=== Ninth Doctor novels ===
With the revival of the television series, BBC Books retired its paperback Eighth Doctor Adventures and Past Doctor Adventures fiction lines in 2005 in favour of a new range of hardback books featuring the Ninth Doctor and Rose. These have a reduced word count compared to the EDA and PDA lines, with an average page count of about 250. (Initially, the EDA and PDA lines overlapped with the New Series Adventures; the final EDA, The Gallifrey Chronicles, was published in June 2005, followed by the final PDA, Atom Bomb Blues, a Seventh Doctor adventure, being published in December 2005.)

The 2005 series episode "Boom Town" makes a reference to the Doctor and Rose's trip to the Justicia system. This took place in The Monsters Inside, making it the first spin-off novel to ever be explicitly referred to in the television series. All the Ninth Doctor novels except Only Human contain "Bad Wolf" references^{[a]} in common with the 2005 television series. Winner Takes All also features the recurring characters Mickey Smith and Jackie Tyler; Jackie also makes a cameo appearance in Only Human.

Unlike many of the BBC's earlier spin-off novels, no definite timeframe exists as to when each of the books take place, though the first three probably take place between "World War Three" and "The Empty Child". Of the latter three (which feature Captain Jack), Only Human and The Deviant Strain take place between "The Doctor Dances" and "Boom Town", while The Stealers of Dreams takes place after "Boom Town" as the events of that episode are referenced, although on-screen dialogue in the episode "Bad Wolf" makes it a challenge to place this novel into the show's continuity. However, it is possible that after "Boom Town", the Doctor, Rose and Jack went somewhere else before returning the egg to Raxacoricofallapatorius.

The first books in the series were popular in the UK. In Canada, the books were not carried by the same distributor as the BBC Books paperbacks, and were initially available only through comic book shops and online retailers when Diamond Comic Distributors took up the contract.

During 2005, the New Series Adventures featuring the Ninth Doctor were published concurrently with the paperback Eighth Doctor and Past Doctor Adventures series. However, following the publication of the Past Doctor Adventure Atom Bomb Blues (featuring the Seventh Doctor) in November 2005, no new paperback releases were announced, with BBC Books choosing to focus on the New Series Adventures exclusively as the books moved on to featuring the Tenth Doctor.

=== Tenth Doctor novels ===
With the departure of Christopher Eccleston from the role of the Doctor, BBC Books subsequently announced the publication of three novels featuring the Tenth Doctor and Rose, released on 13 April 2006. These books follow the same style and format as those featuring the Ninth Doctor, with a continuation of the spine numbering. Range consultant and commissioning editor Justin Richards told Doctor Who Magazine that there would be no Ninth Doctor novels in 2006, and the decision as to whether to continue to publish stories with the Ninth Doctor as a separate range has not yet been taken.

Abridged audiobooks were released of all of the Tenth Doctor titles (except the Quick Read series). The first three are narrated by David Tennant (who plays the Tenth Doctor), and were released on 3 July 2006. The Nightmare of Black Island (read by Anthony Head), The Art of Destruction (read by Don Warrington), and The Price of Paradise (read by Shaun Dingwall), were released in November 2006.

Four books in the series were released exclusively as paperback novellas under the Quick Reads scheme to inspire literacy among children. One of these novellas, Made of Steel, featured new companion Martha Jones before the character made her television debut ("Smith and Jones"). It was also the first New Series Adventure to be written by Terrance Dicks, a long-time veteran of Doctor Who and former writer for the original series, making him the only writer who has written novels for every line of Doctor Who fiction with the exception of the Telos novellas. Despite the character of Martha Jones having left the television series at the end of the 2007 season (although she subsequently appeared in several episodes of the 2008 season), the novels released in early 2008 continued to feature her as a companion, rather than the Doctor's new companion, Donna Noble.

Donna featured in all three of the novels released in late 2008. The Boxing Day 2008 release saw the series cover new ground with one book featuring Donna Noble, one book covering Martha Jones' adventures between the episodes "The Sound of Drums" (2007) and "Last of the Time Lords" (2007), and one book featuring the Doctor travelling without a companion following the events of "Journey's End" (2008). The 2009 releases (including 6 books in the main series, 1 novella and The Darksmith Legacy) all follow the mould of the Doctor travelling without a regular companion. These books also feature aliens from the New Series. Whilst this is not the first time this has happened (The Monsters Inside), it is the first time they are on the cover, or referenced in the title.

In 2020 BBC Books released two new novels featuring the Tenth Doctor to tie in with the Time Lord Victorious multi-platform storyline. The Eighth and Ninth Doctors also appeared in both books.

=== Eleventh Doctor novels ===
The series of Eleventh Doctor novels began in April 2010, with a new cover design, amending the Gallifreyan numbering system on the spine. The titles quickly reached sales numbers of the previous Tenth Doctor novels, and a further batches of three books have been released on a regular basis since July 2010.

In October 2009 Michael Moorcock confirmed that he would be writing a one-off, supersize novel, combining prose with hand-drawn sketches, images and exclusive artwork. The title was confirmed as The Coming of the Terraphiles, and it was released in November 2010. It did not form part of the usual range of novels, and featured characters from Michael Moorcock's Second Ether books. Two further books followed in the hardback range, The Silent Stars Go By, released in September 2011, and Dark Horizons, the only novel released that year, in July 2012.

In April 2011 BBC Books launched a new range of "chapter books" that offer readers aged 8–12 two stories in one publication (or "2in1", which appears on the books' covers). The first two releases had flippable covers and a divided spine design. In late August 2011 the second batch of releases was published with a surtitle applied to the two stories and a shared cover with a more traditional blurb for each of the two stories on the back of the books. The next batch of 2in1 stories was released in February 2012.

In June 2011, BBC books published "Touched by an Angel", with the plot involving a man named Mark, who is grieving the death of his wife Rebecca Whitaker who died in a car crash; when he is sent back in time by a Weeping Angel, he attempts to stop her dying, and the Doctor, Amy and Rory track him down and try to stop him before he creates a paradox. The story was also released as an audiobook on 6 CDs read by Clare Corbett.

And in April 2013, BBC Books published "The Dalek Generation", with the plot involving Daleks manipulating a planet posing as benefactors and helpers while plotting to use an alien device for their own ends. An unabridged audiobook version was also released on 6 June 2013.

=== Twelfth Doctor novels ===
In May 2014, it was revealed that New Series Adventures would release books starring the Twelfth Doctor and Clara Oswald, which were released in September 2014. The titles of the released books are Silhouette, The Crawling Terror, and The Blood Cell. The next wave was released in September 2015, with each book under the name of the Glamour Chronicles. The stories featured were Deep Time, Royal Blood and Big Bang Generation; first two of these feature the Twelfth Doctor and Clara, and the latter marking first New Series Adventure appearance of Bernice Summerfield, alongside the Twelfth Doctor.

A new wave was released in April 2017 with the arrival of Bill Potts and Nardole making a presence to prose. The stories featuring are Diamond Dogs, The Shining Man and Plague City.

=== Thirteenth Doctor novels ===
In July 2017, it was revealed that Penguin Random House would publish books featuring the Thirteenth Doctor.

The Good Doctor was released on 25 October 2018. Molten Heart was released on 8 November 2018. Combat Magicks was released on 22 November 2018.

In 2018, it was announced that author David Solomons would write two novels featuring the 13th Doctor to be published by BBC Children's Books with the first book, The Secret in Vault 13, set to be released on 1 November 2018. The second, The Maze of Doom, was published on 30 April 2020.

In 2020, actress Sophie Aldred released a brand-new novel featuring the Thirteenth Doctor and Ace called At Childhood's End.

=== Fifteenth Doctor novels ===
In April 2024, it was announced that three novels featuring the Fifteenth Doctor with Ruby Sunday would be released; Ruby Red and Caged in June 2024, and Eden Rebellion in November 2024.

In February 2025, two new novels were announced, with Fear Death by Water featuring the Doctor on a solo adventure, and Spectral Scream featuring new companion Belinda Chandra, both releasing in May 2025.

In June 2025, another new novel, The Moon Cruise, also featuring Belinda, was announced, due to be released in November 2025.

== Audio stories ==
Starting with The Stone Rose, all of the New Series Adventures featuring the Tenth Doctor have been released as abridged audio books, normally around three months after the print publication. The first three stories in the range were narrated by David Tennant, with subsequent stories narrated by different members of the cast. In January 2010, it was decided that the stories would be released, unabridged, as download-only exclusives, and that no further stories were to be published on CD. This affected the last five Tenth Doctor novels, and continued with the release of the Eleventh and Twelfth Doctor novels. There has also been a separate range of audio-only stories. These are linked to the novels, but are available on CD and download formats. The range began in July 2008 with Pest Control, and has since contained seven stories featuring the Tenth Doctor, fourteen stories about the Eleventh Doctor, and continue with the Twelfth Doctor.

In August 2011, the Ninth Doctor Adventures started being released as unabridged downloadable audiobooks. The first book was released in August 2011 and the next one will be released in September. It is not known when the following books will be released as audiobooks, but they presumably will at some point.

== List of New Series Adventures ==
=== Novels ===
==== Ninth Doctor ====
#	Title	Author	Companion	Published	ISBN	Audiobook narrator
1	The Clockwise Man	Justin Richards	Rose Tyler	19 May 2005	0-563-48628-7	Nicholas Briggs
2	The Monsters Inside	Stephen Cole	Rose Tyler	19 May 2005	0-563-48629-5	Camille Coduri
3	Winner Takes All	Jacqueline Rayner	Rose Tyler, Mickey Smith	19 May 2005	0-563-48627-9	Camille Coduri
4	The Deviant Strain	Justin Richards	Rose Tyler, Captain Jack Harkness	8 September 2005	0-563-48637-6	Stuart Milligan
5	Only Human	Gareth Roberts	Rose Tyler, Captain Jack Harkness	8 September 2005	0-563-48639-2	Anthony Head
6	The Stealers of Dreams	Steve Lyons	Rose Tyler, Captain Jack Harkness	8 September 2005	0-563-48638-4	Camille Coduri

==== Tenth Doctor ====
#	Title	Author	Companion	Published	ISBN	Audiobook narrator
7	The Stone Rose	Jacqueline Rayner	Rose Tyler, Mickey Smith	13 April 2006	0-563-48643-0	David Tennant
8	The Feast of the Drowned	Stephen Cole	Rose Tyler, Mickey Smith	13 April 2006	0-563-48644-9	David Tennant
9	The Resurrection Casket	Justin Richards	Rose Tyler	13 April 2006	0-563-48642-2	David Tennant
10	The Nightmare of Black Island	Mike Tucker	Rose Tyler	21 September 2006	0-563-48650-3	Anthony Head
11	The Art of Destruction	Stephen Cole	Rose Tyler	21 September 2006	0-563-48651-1	Don Warrington
12	The Price of Paradise	Colin Brake	Rose Tyler	21 September 2006	0-563-48652-X	Shaun Dingwall
13	Sting of the Zygons	Stephen Cole	Martha Jones	19 April 2007	1-84607-225-5	Reggie Yates
14	The Last Dodo	Jacqueline Rayner	Martha Jones	19 April 2007	1-84607-224-7	Freema Agyeman
15	Wooden Heart	Martin Day	Martha Jones	19 April 2007	1-84607-226-3	Adjoa Andoh
16	Forever Autumn	Mark Morris	Martha Jones	6 September 2007	1-84607-270-0	Will Thorp
17	Sick Building	Paul Magrs	Martha Jones	6 September 2007	1-84607-269-7	Will Thorp
18	Wetworld	Mark Michalowski	Martha Jones	6 September 2007	1-84607-271-9	Freema Agyeman
19	Wishing Well	Trevor Baxendale	Martha Jones	27 December 2007	1-84607-348-0	Debbie Chazen
20	The Pirate Loop	Simon Guerrier	Martha Jones	27 December 2007	1-84607-347-2	Freema Agyeman
21	Peacemaker	James Swallow	Martha Jones	27 December 2007	1-84607-349-9	Will Thorp
22	Martha in the Mirror	Justin Richards	Martha Jones	1 May 2008	1-84607-420-7	Freema Agyeman
23	Snowglobe 7	Mike Tucker	Martha Jones	1 May 2008	1-84607-421-5	Georgia Tennant
24	The Many Hands	Dale Smith	Martha Jones	1 May 2008	1-84607-422-3	David Troughton
25	Ghosts of India	Mark Morris	Donna Noble	4 September 2008	1-84607-559-9	David Troughton
26	The Doctor Trap	Simon Messingham	Donna Noble	4 September 2008	1-84607-558-0	Russell Tovey
27	Shining Darkness	Mark Michalowski	Donna Noble	4 September 2008	1-84607-557-2	Debbie Chazen
28	The Story of Martha	Dan Abnett^{[b]}	Martha Jones	26 December 2008	1-84607-561-0	Freema Agyeman
29	Beautiful Chaos	Gary Russell	Donna Noble, Wilfred Mott	26 December 2008	1-84607-563-7	Bernard Cribbins
30	The Eyeless	Lance Parkin	None	26 December 2008	1-84607-562-9	Russell Tovey
31	Judgement of the Judoon	Colin Brake	Nikki Jupiter^{[c]}	2 April 2009	1-84607-639-0	Nicholas Briggs
32	The Slitheen Excursion	Simon Guerrier	June Walsh^{[c]}	2 April 2009	1-84607-640-4	Debbie Chazen
33	Prisoner of the Daleks	Trevor Baxendale	Jon Bowman	2 April 2009	1-84607-641-2	Nicholas Briggs
34	The Taking of Chelsea 426	David Llewellyn	Jake Vienna Carstairs	17 September 2009	1-84607-758-3	Christopher Ryan
35	Autonomy	Daniel Blythe	Kate Maguire	17 September 2009	1-84607-759-1	Georgia Tennant
36	The Krillitane Storm	Christopher Cooper	Emily Parr	17 September 2009	1-84607-761-3	Will Thorp
S5	In the Blood	Jenny T. Colgan	Donna Noble	12 May 2016	1-78594-110-0	

==== Eleventh Doctor ====
#	Title	Author	Companion	Published	ISBN	Audiobook narrator
37	Apollo 23	Justin Richards	Amy Pond	22 April 2010	1-84607-200-X	James Albrecht
38	Night of the Humans	David Llewellyn	Amy Pond	22 April 2010	1-84607-969-1	Arthur Darvill
39	The Forgotten Army	Brian Minchin	Amy Pond	22 April 2010	1-84607-987-X	Olivia Colman
40	Nuclear Time	Oli Smith	Amy Pond, Rory Williams	8 July 2010	1-84607-989-6	Nicholas Briggs
41	The King's Dragon	Una McCormack	Amy Pond, Rory Williams	8 July 2010	1-84607-990-X	Nicholas Briggs
42	The Glamour Chase	Gary Russell	Amy Pond, Rory Williams	8 July 2010	1-84607-988-8	Arthur Darvill
S1	The Coming of the Terraphiles	Michael Moorcock	Amy Pond	14 October 2010	1-84607-983-7	Clive Mantle
43	Dead of Winter	James Goss	Amy Pond, Rory Williams	28 April 2011	1-84990-238-0	Clare Corbett
44	The Way Through the Woods	Una McCormack	Amy Pond, Rory Williams	28 April 2011	1-84990-237-2	Clare Corbett
45	Hunter's Moon	Paul Finch	Amy Pond, Rory Williams	28 April 2011	1-84990-236-4	Arthur Darvill
46	Touched by an Angel	Jonathan Morris	Amy Pond, Rory Williams	23 June 2011	1-84990-234-8	Clare Corbett
47	Paradox Lost	George Mann	Amy Pond, Rory Williams	23 June 2011	1-84990-235-6	Nicholas Briggs
48	Borrowed Time	Naomi Alderman	Amy Pond, Rory Williams	23 June 2011	1-84990-233-X	Meera Syal
S2	The Silent Stars Go By	Dan Abnett	Amy Pond, Rory Williams	29 September 2011	1-84990-243-7	Michael Maloney
S3	Dark Horizons	J T Colgan	None	7 July 2012	1-84990-456-1	Neve McIntosh
49	Plague of the Cybermen	Justin Richards	None	11 April 2013	1-84990-234-8	David Warner
50	The Dalek Generation	Nicholas Briggs	None	11 April 2013	1-84990-575-4	Nicholas Briggs
51	Shroud of Sorrow	Tommy Donbavand	Clara Oswald	11 April 2013	1-84990-576-2	Frances Barber

==== Twelfth Doctor ====
#	Title	Author	Companion	Published	ISBN	Audiobook narrator
52	The Blood Cell	James Goss	Clara Oswald	11 September 2014	1-84990-774-9	Colin McFarlane
53	Silhouette	Justin Richards	Clara Oswald, Madame Vastra, Jenny Flint and Strax	11 September 2014	1-84990-772-2	Dan Starkey
54	The Crawling Terror	Mike Tucker	Clara Oswald	11 September 2014	1-84990-773-0	Neve McIntosh
55	Royal Blood	Una McCormack	Clara Oswald	10 September 2015	1-84990-992-X	David Warner
56	Big Bang Generation	Gary Russell	Bernice Summerfield, Peter Summerfield, Ruth, Jack	10 September 2015	1-84990-991-1	Lisa Bowerman
57	Deep Time	Trevor Baxendale	Clara Oswald	10 September 2015	1-84990-990-3	Dan Starkey
58	The Shining Man	Cavan Scott	Bill Potts	20 April 2017	1-78594-268-9	
59	Diamond Dogs	Mike Tucker	Bill Potts	20 April 2017	1-78594-269-7	
60	Plague City	Jonathan Morris	Bill Potts, Nardole	20 April 2017	1-78594-270-0	

==== Thirteenth Doctor ====
#	Title	Author	Companion	Published	ISBN	Audiobook narrator
61	The Good Doctor	Juno Dawson	Graham O'Brien, Ryan Sinclair, Yasmin Khan	25 October 2018	9781785943843	Clare Corbett
62	Molten Heart	Una McCormack	Graham O'Brien, Ryan Sinclair, Yasmin Khan	25 October 2018	9781785943638	Dan Starkey
63	Combat Magicks	Steve Cole	Graham O'Brien, Ryan Sinclair, Yasmin Khan	25 October 2018	9781785943690	Mandip Gill
S6	At Childhood's End	Sophie Aldred (with Steve Cole and Mike Tucker)	Graham O'Brien, Ryan Sinclair, Yasmin Khan, Ace	6 February 2020	978-1-78594-499-4	Sophie Aldred

==== Fifteenth Doctor ====
#	Title	Author	Companion	Published	ISBN	Audiobook narrator
64	Ruby Red	Georgia Cook	Ruby Sunday	13 June 2024	9781785948992	Millie Gibson
65	Caged	Una McCormack	Ruby Sunday	27 June 2024	9781785949180	Bonnie Langford
66	Eden Rebellion	Abi Falase	Ruby Sunday	14 November 2024	9781785949197	Genesis Lynea
67	Fear Death by Water	Emily Cook	Grace Darling	29 May 2025	9781785949616	Susan Twist
68	Spectral Scream	Hannah Fergesen	Belinda Chandra	29 May 2025	9781785949623	Michelle Asante
69	The Moon Cruise	Esmie Jikiemi-Pearson	Belinda Chandra	13 November 2025	9781785949777	Caoilfhionn Dunne

==== Others ====
#	Title	Author	Doctor	Featuring companion	Published	ISBN	Audiobook narrator	Notes
S4	Engines of War	George Mann	War	Cinder	31 July 2014	1-84990-848-6	Nicholas Briggs	
—	The Knight, The Fool and The Dead	Steve Cole	8th, 9th, 10th	Rose Tyler	1 October 2020	978-1785946325		Ties into the Time Lord Victorious storyline.
—	All Flesh is Grass	Una McCormack	8th, 9th, 10th	None	10 December 2020	978-1-78594-633-2		Ties into the Time Lord Victorious storyline.
S7	The Ruby's Curse	Alex Kingston (with Jacqueline Rayner)	None	None	20 May 2021	9781785947131	Alex Kingston	The Second novel for the Doctor to not be the main character.
—	Extraction Point	M G Harris	2nd, 9th		10 August 2023	9781785948244	None	Ties into the Doom's Day storyline. The third novel for the Doctor to not be the main character.
S8	Death in the Stars	Bonnie Langford (with Jacqueline Rayner)	N/A	Mel Bush	22 August 2024		Bonnie Langford	
S9	The Kaleidoscope	Jo Martin	Fugitive Doctor	Martha Jones	3 September 2026	978-1911743101		Ties into the Circuit Breaker storyline.

=== Cancelled novel ===
1. The Rain of Terror
- Author: Mike Tucker
- Due Date: 8 September 2005
- Doctor: Ninth
- Companions: Rose Tyler & Captain Jack Harkness
- Information: This was originally due as part of the second selection of Ninth Doctor novels; however, in Doctor Who Magazine #374, author Mike Tucker, revealed that due to a heavy workload, he was unable to make changes to the story that had been requested by the production office, and therefore they decided to drop the story in favour of Steve Lyons' The Stealers of Dreams. The original storyline was later reworked into an Eleventh Doctor book with the same title, as part of the 2in1 line (see below).

=== Chapter books (2 in 1 series) ===
#	Title	Author	Collection title	Featuring companion	Published	ISBN
1	Heart of Stone	Trevor Baxendale	N/A	Amy Pond & Rory Williams	3 February 2011	1-4059-0757-6
1	Death Riders	Justin Richards	N/A	Amy Pond & Rory Williams	3 February 2011	1-4059-0757-6
2	The Good, the Bad and the Alien	Colin Brake	N/A	Amy Pond & Rory Williams	3 February 2011	1-4059-0758-4
2	System Wipe	Oli Smith	N/A	Amy Pond & Rory Williams	3 February 2011	1-4059-0758-4
3	The Underwater War	Richard Dinnick	Alien Adventures	Amy Pond & Rory Williams	1 September 2011	1-4059-0767-3
3	Rain of Terror	Mike Tucker	Alien Adventures	Amy Pond & Rory Williams	1 September 2011	1-4059-0767-3
4	Web in Space	David Bailey	Sightseeing in Space	Amy Pond & Rory Williams	1 September 2011	1-4059-0768-1
4	Terminal of Despair	Steve Lyons	Sightseeing in Space	Amy Pond & Rory Williams	1 September 2011	1-4059-0768-1
5	Horror of the Space Snakes	Gary Russell	Monstrous Missions	Amy Pond & Rory Williams	2 February 2012	1-4059-0804-1
5	Terrible Lizards	Jonathan Green	Monstrous Missions	Amy Pond & Rory Williams	2 February 2012	1-4059-0804-1
6	Extra Time	Richard Dungworth	Step Back in Time	Amy Pond & Rory Williams	2 February 2012	1-4059-0805-X
6	The Water Thief	Jacqueline Rayner	Step Back in Time	Amy Pond & Rory Williams	2 February 2012	1-4059-0805-X

=== Quick Reads ===
#	Title	Author	Doctor	Featuring companion	Published	ISBN
1	I am a Dalek	Gareth Roberts	Tenth	Rose Tyler	19 May 2006	0-563-48648-1
2	Made of Steel	Terrance Dicks	Tenth	Martha Jones	1 March 2007	1-84607-204-2
3	Revenge of the Judoon	Terrance Dicks	Tenth	Martha Jones	6 March 2008	1-84607-372-3
4	The Sontaran Games	Jacqueline Rayner	Tenth	Emma James^{[c]}	26 February 2009	1-84607-643-9
5	Code of the Krillitanes	Justin Richards	Tenth	None	4 March 2010	1-84607-928-4
6	Magic of the Angels	Jacqueline Rayner	Eleventh	Amy Pond & Rory Williams	2 February 2012	1-84990-286-0
7	The Silurian Gift	Mike Tucker	Eleventh	None	7 February 2013	1-84990-558-4

=== Decide Your Destiny ===
#	Title	Author	Doctor	Featuring companion	Published	ISBN
1	The Spaceship Graveyard	Colin Brake	Tenth	Martha Jones	5 July 2007	978-1-4059-0376-9
2	Alien Arena	Richard Dungworth	Tenth	Martha Jones	5 July 2007	978-1-4059-0352-3
3	The Time Crocodile	Colin Brake	Tenth	Martha Jones	5 July 2007	978-1-4059-0350-9
4	The Corinthian Project	Davey Moore	Tenth	Martha Jones	5 July 2007	978-1-4059-0345-5
5	The Crystal Snare	Richard Dungworth	Tenth	Martha Jones	4 October 2007	978-1-4059-0381-3
6	War of the Robots	Trevor Baxendale	Tenth	Martha Jones	4 October 2007	978-1-4059-0382-0
7	Dark Planet	Davey Moore	Tenth	Martha Jones	4 October 2007	978-1-4059-0379-0
8	The Haunted Wagon Train	Colin Brake	Tenth	Martha Jones	4 October 2007	978-1-4059-0380-6
9	Lost Luggage	Colin Brake	Tenth	None	6 March 2008	978-1-4059-0401-8
10	Second Skin	Richard Dungworth	Tenth	None	6 March 2008	978-1-4059-0402-5
11	The Dragon King	Trevor Baxendale	Tenth	None	6 March 2008	978-1-4059-0403-2
12	The Horror of Howling Hill	Jonathan Green	Tenth	Martha Jones	6 March 2008	978-1-4059-0404-9
13	Claws of the Macra	Trevor Baxendale	Eleventh	Amy Pond	29 April 2010	978-1-4059-0685-2
14	The Coldest War	Colin Brake	Eleventh	Amy Pond	29 April 2010	978-1-4059-0686-9
15	Judoon Monsoon	Oli Smith	Eleventh	Amy Pond & Rory Williams	2 September 2010	978-1-4059-0697-5
16	Empire of the Wolf	Neil Corry	Eleventh	Amy Pond	2 September 2010	978-1-4059-0715-6

=== Choose the Future ===
#	Title	Author	Doctor	Featuring companion	Published	ISBN
1	Night of the Kraken	Jonathan Green	Twelfth	None	28 April 2016	978-1-4059-2650-8
2	Terror Moon	Trevor Baxendale	Twelfth	None	1 September 2016	978-1-4059-2651-5

=== Original audiobooks ===
#	Title	Author	Doctor	Featuring companion	Read by	Published	ISBN
1	Pest Control	Peter Anghelides	Tenth	Donna Noble	David Tennant	8 May 2008	978-1-4056-7819-3
2	The Forever Trap	Dan Abnett	Tenth	Donna Noble	Catherine Tate	9 October 2008	978-1-4084-0678-6
3	The Nemonite Invasion	David Roden	Tenth	Donna Noble	Catherine Tate	12 February 2009	978-1-4084-0679-3
4	The Rising Night	Scott Handcock	Tenth	None	Michelle Ryan	2 July 2009	978-1-4084-0938-1
5	The Day of the Troll	Simon Messingham	Tenth	None	David Tennant	8 October 2009	978-1-4084-0939-8
6	The Last Voyage	Dan Abnett	Tenth	None	David Tennant	7 January 2010	978-1-4084-0940-4
7	Dead Air	James Goss	Tenth	None	David Tennant	4 March 2010	978-1-4084-2680-7
8	The Ring of Steel	Stephen Cole	Eleventh	Amy Pond	Arthur Darvill	5 August 2010	978-1-4084-2761-3
9	The Runaway Train	Oli Smith	Eleventh	Amy Pond	Matt Smith	7 October 2010	978-1-4084-2747-7
10	The Jade Pyramid	Martin Day	Eleventh	Amy Pond	Matt Smith	6 January 2011	978-1-4084-2749-1
11	The Gemini Contagion	Jason Arnopp	Eleventh	Amy Pond	Meera Syal	3 March 2011	978-1-4084-6816-6
12	The Hounds of Artemis	James Goss	Eleventh	Amy Pond	Matt Smith and Clare Corbett	4 April 2011	978-1-4084-2746-0
13	The Eye of the Jungle	Darren Jones	Eleventh	Amy Pond & Rory Williams	David Troughton	7 July 2011	978-1-4084-6815-9
14	Blackout	Oli Smith	Eleventh	Amy Pond & Rory Williams	Stuart Milligan	8 September 2011	978-1-4084-6878-4
15	The Art of Death	James Goss	Eleventh	Amy Pond & Rory Williams	Raquel Cassidy	5 January 2012	978-1-4084-6881-4
16	Darkstar Academy	Mark Morris	Eleventh	Amy Pond & Rory Williams	Alexander Armstrong	8 March 2012	978-1-4084-6879-1
17	Day of the Cockroach	Steve Lyons	Eleventh	Amy Pond & Rory Williams	Arthur Darvill	3 May 2012	978-1-4084-6880-7
18	The Nu-Humans	Cavan Scott and Mark Wright	Eleventh	Amy Pond & Rory Williams	Raquel Cassidy	5 July 2012	978-1-4458-6762-5
19	The Empty House	Simon Guerrier	Eleventh	Amy Pond & Rory Williams	Raquel Cassidy	6 September 2012	978-1-4084-6882-1
20	The Sleepers in the Dust	Darren Jones	Eleventh	Amy Pond & Rory Williams	Arthur Darvill	1 November 2012	978-1-4458-9173-6
21	Snake Bite	Scott Handcock	Eleventh	Amy Pond & Rory Williams	Frances Barber	6 December 2012	978-1-4084-6836-4
22	The Gods of Winter	James Goss	Twelfth	Clara Oswald	Claire Higgins	20 August 2015	978-1-7852-9138-8
23	The House of Winter	George Mann	Twelfth	Clara Oswald	David Schofield	15 October 2015	978-1-7852-9104-3
24	The Sins of Winter	James Goss	Twelfth	Clara Oswald	Robin Soans	3 December 2015	978-1-7852-9214-9
25	The Memory of Winter	George Mann	Twelfth	Clara Oswald	Jemma Redgrave	7 April 2016	978-1-7852-9249-1
26	The Lost Angel	George Mann and Cavan Scott	Twelfth	Alex & Brandon Yow	Kerry Shale	5 January 2017	978-1-7852-9533-1
27	The Lost Planet	George Mann	Twelfth	Alex & Brandon Yow	Nicola Bryant	2 March 2017	978-1-7852-9693-2
28	The Lost Magic	Cavan Scott	Twelfth	Alex & Brandon Yow	Dan Starkey	4 May 2017	978-1-7852-9695-6
29	The Lost Flame	George Mann and Cavan Scott	Twelfth	Alex & Brandon Yow	Claire Higgins	6 July 2017	978-1-7852-9697-0
30	Death Among the Stars	Steve Lyons	Twelfth	None	Nicola Bryant	7 September 2017	978-1-7852-9805-9
31	Rhythm of Destruction	Darren Jones	Twelfth	Tommy Loco	Dan Starkey	2 November 2017	978-1-7852-9829-5
32	Paradise Lost	Darren Jones	Eleventh	Clara Oswald	Jacob Dudman	6 February 2020	ISBN 978-1-78753-771-2
S1	The Minds of Magnox	Darren Jones	Tenth	Brian the Ood	Jacob Dudman	3 December 2020	ISBN 978-1-52912-841-3
33	The Nightmare Realm	Jonathan Morris	Twelfth	Nardole	Dan Starkey	3 June 2021	978-1-52912-690-7
34	The Ashes of Eternity	Niel Bushnell	Ninth	Rose Tyler	Adjoa Andoh	7 October 2021	ISBN 978-1-52912-784-3
35	The Ice Kings	Niel Bushnell	Twelfth	None	Maureen O'Brien	5 January 2023	978-1-52913-861-0
36	On Ghost Beach	Niel Bushnell	Fifteenth	Ruby Sunday	Susan Twist	7 November 2024	978-1-52994-058-9
37	Sting of the Sasquatch	Darren Jones	Fifteenth	Ruby Sunday	Genesis Lynea	7 November 2024	978-1-52994-060-2
38	Firefall	Beth Axford	Fifteenth	Belinda Chandra	Michelle Asante	2 October 2025	978-1-52996-420-2
39	Counterstrike	Una McCormack	Fifteenth	Belinda Chandra	Clare Corbett	2 October 2025	978-1-52996-422-6

=== The Darksmith Legacy ===
#	Title	Author	Doctor	Published	ISBN
1	The Dust of Ages	Justin Richards	Tenth	29 January 2009	978-1-4059-0513-8
2	The Graves of Mordane	Colin Brake	Tenth	29 January 2009	978-1-4059-0514-5
3	The Colour of Darkness	Richard Dungworth	Tenth	26 February 2009	978-1-4059-0515-2
4	The Depths of Despair	Justin Richards	Tenth	26 March 2009	978-1-4059-0516-9
5	The Vampire of Paris	Stephen Cole	Tenth	30 April 2009	978-1-4059-0517-6
6	The Game of Death	Trevor Baxendale	Tenth	28 May 2009	978-1-4059-0518-3
7	The Planet of Oblivion	Justin Richards	Tenth	25 June 2009	978-1-4059-0519-0
8	The Picture of Emptiness	Jacqueline Rayner	Tenth	30 July 2009	978-1-4059-0520-6
9	The Art of War	Mike Tucker	Tenth	27 August 2009	978-1-4059-0521-3
10	The End of Time	Justin Richards	Tenth	24 September 2009	978-1-4059-0522-0

=== Puffin Classics crossovers ===
Title	Author	Doctor	Featuring companion	Published	ISBN	Audiobook narrator	Notes
The Wonderful Doctor of Oz	Jacqueline Rayner	Thirteenth	Graham O'Brien, Ryan Sinclair, Yasmin Khan	10 June 2021	9781405948005		
Legends of Camelot	Jacqueline Rayner	Tenth	Donna Noble	10 June 2021	9781405947985		
The Return of Robin Hood	Paul Magrs	Fourth	Sarah Jane Smith, Harry Sullivan	21 July 2022	9781405952309		
Josephine and the Argonauts	Paul Magrs	Third	Jo Grant, The Brigadier, Sergeant Benton	24 August 2023	9781405956925		
Rebellion on Treasure Island	Bali Rai	Eleventh	Clara Oswald, River Song, Madam Vastra, Jenny, Strax	28 September 2023	9781405952330		
Doctor Who in Wonderland	Paul Magrs	Fifth	Nyssa, Tegan, Turlough	25 July 2024	978-1405969895		
Frankenstein & The Patchwork Man	Jack Heath	Ninth	Rose Tyler	24 April 2025	978-1405965262		
Dracula!	Paul Magrs	First	Ian, Barbara & Susan	11 September 2025	978-1405976367		

=== Anthologies ===
Since 2014 BBC books have published a number of anthologies featuring all The Doctors and various other characters from the TV show, unlike earlier anthology book The Story of Martha these have been put out as special releases separate from the main New Series Adventures range.

Title	Author(s)	Doctor	Published	ISBN	Notes
Tales of Trenzalore: The Eleventh Doctor's Last Stand	Justin Richards, George Mann, Paul Finch, Mark Morris	Eleven	3 July 2014	978-1849908443	
The Shakespeare Notebooks	Justin Richards	N/A	12 June 2014	978-0062344427	
The Dangerous Book of Monsters: The Doctor's Official Guide	Justin Richards	Twelfth	1 October 2014	978-1405920032	
How to be a Time Lord	Craig Donaghy	Eleventh	2 October 2014	978-0723294368	
A History of Humankind: The Doctor's Official Guide	Justin Richards	Twelfth	6 October 2014	978-1405926539	
12 Doctors, 12 Stories	Eoin Colfer, Michael Scott, Marcus Sedgwick, Philip Reeve, Patrick Ness, Richelle Mead, Malorie Blackman, Alex Scarrow, Charlie Higson, Derek Landy, Neil Gaiman, Holly Black	First, Second, Third, Fourth, Fifth, Sixth, Seventh, Eighth, Ninth, Tenth, Eleventh, Twelfth	23 December 2014	978-0141359885	
Time Trips	Cecelia Ahern, Jake Arnott, Trudi Canavan, Jenny T Colgan, Stella Duffy, Nick Harkaway, Joanne Harris, A.L. Kennedy	Second, Third, Fourth, Sixth, Tenth, Eleventh, Twelfth	5 March 2015	978-1849907712	
The Scientific Secrets of Doctor Who	Simon Guerrier, Marek Kukula, Mark Wright, George Mann, James Goss, Jonathan Morris, Jenny Colgan, James Swallow, L.M. Myles, Una McCormack, Justin Richards, Jacqueline Rayner, Marc Platt, Mark Morris, Andrew Cartmel, David Llewellyn, Andrew Smith	First, Second, Third, Fourth, Fifth, Sixth, Seventh, Eighth, Ninth, Tenth, Eleventh, Twelfth	4 June 2015	978-0062386960	
The Time Lord Letters	Justin Richards	First, Second, Third, Fourth, Fifth, Sixth, Seventh, Eighth, Ninth, Tenth, Eleventh	24 September 2015	978-1849909631	
Time Lord Fairy Tales	Justin Richards	N/A	1 October 2015	978-1405920025	
The Legends of Ashildr	James Goss, David Llewellyn, Jenny T. Colgan, Justin Richards	N/A	10 December 2015	978-1785940576	
The Legends of River Song	Jenny T. Colgan, Jacqueline Rayner, Steve Lyons, Guy Adams, Andrew Lane	N/A	2 June 2016	978-1785940880	
Twelve Doctors of Christmas	Jacqueline Rayner, Colin Brake, Richard Dungworth, Mike Tucker, Gary Russell, Scott Handcock	First, Second, Third, Fourth, Fifth, Sixth, Seventh, Eighth, Ninth, Tenth, Eleventh, Twelfth	8 March 2018	978-1405928953	
The American Adventures	Justin Richards	Twelfth	25 October 2016	978-1405928724	
Myths & Legends	Richard Dinnick	First, Sixth, Twelfth	29 June 2017	978-1785942495	
Tales of Terror	Jacqueline Rayner, Mike Tucker, Paul Magrs, Richard Dungworth, Scott Handcock, Craig Donaghy	First, Second, Third, Fourth, Fifth, Sixth, Seventh, Eighth, Ninth, Tenth, Eleventh, Twelfth	7 September 2017	978-1405930031	
The Companion's Companion	Craig Donaghy	N/A	6 April 2017	978-1405929691	
The Missy Chronicles	James Goss, Cavan Scott, Paul Magrs, Peter Anghelides, Jacqueline Rayner, Richard Dinnick	N/A	22 February 2018	978-1785943232	
The Day She Saved the Doctor: Four Stories from the TARDIS	Jacqueline Rayner, Jenny T. Colgan, Susan Calman, Dorothy Koomson	Fourth, Ninth, Eleventh, Twelfth	8 March 2018	978-1405929974	
Twelve Angels Weeping	Dave Rudden	Fourth, Fifth, Sixth, War, Eleventh, Twelfth, Thirteenth	11 October 2018	978-1405938273	
The Day She Saved the Doctor: Four Stories from the TARDIS	Jacqueline Rayner, Jenny T. Colgan, Susan Calman, Dorothy Koomson	Fourth, Ninth, Eleventh, Twelfth	8 March 2018	978-1405929974	
The Women Who Lived	Christel Dee, Simon Guerrier	Thirteenth	27 September 2018	9781785943591	
Thirteen Doctors, 13 Stories	Eoin Colfer, Michael Scott, Marcus Sedgwick, Philip Reeve, Patrick Ness, Richelle Mead, Malorie Blackman, Alex Scarrow, Charlie Higson, Derek Landy, Neil Gaiman, Holly Black, Naomi Alderman	First, Second, Third, Fourth, Fifth, Sixth, Seventh, Eighth, Ninth, Tenth, Eleventh, Twelfth, Thirteenth	7 March 2019	978-0241356173	
The Target Storybook	Joy Wilkinson, Simon Guerrier, Terrance Dicks, Matthew Sweet, Susie Day, Matthew Waterhouse, Colin Baker, Mike Tucker, Steve Cole, George Mann, Una McCormack, Jenny T Colgan, Jacqueline Rayner, Beverly Sanford, Vinay Patel	First, Second, Third, Fourth, Fifth, Sixth, Seventh, Eighth, War, Ninth, Tenth, Metacrisis Doctor, Eleventh, Twelfth, Thirteenth	24 October 2019	978-1785944741	
Star Tales	Jenny T Colgan, Paul Magrs, Jo Cotterill, Steve Cole, Trevor Baxendale, Mike Tucker	Eleventh, Twelfth, Thirteenth	5 December 2019	978-1785944710	
The Wintertime Paradox	Dave Rudden	Fourth, Fifth, Seventh, Eighth, Ninth, Tenth, Eleventh, Twelfth, Thirteenth, The Curator	15 October 2020	978-1-405-94610-0	Canaries was written to tie in with the Time Lord Victorious story and was published on the official Doctor Who website and in the E-copy of the book however it did not feature in the print copy.
Adventures in Lockdown	Chris Chibnall, Steven Moffat, Russell T Davies, Neil Gaiman, Joy Wilkinson, Vinay Patel, Pete McTighe, Paul Cornell, Mark Gatiss	First, Eighth, Ninth, Tenth, Twelfth, Thirteenth, Fugitive	5 November 2020	978-1-785-94-706-3	This book featured stories previously published on the Doctor Who website and stories and transcripts from the Doctor Who Lockdown project. It also featured original stories.
I Am The Master	Peter Anghelides, Mark Wright, Jacqueline Rayner, Mike Tucker, Beverly Sanford, Matthew Sweet	N/A	5 November 2020	978-1-78594-631-8	
Ten Days of Christmas	Steve Cole	Tenth, Fourteenth	12 October 2023	9781405956901	
Fifteen Doctors 15 Stories	N/A	First, Second, Third, Fourth, Fifth, Sixth, Seventh, Eighth, Ninth, Tenth, Eleventh, Twelfth, Thirteenth, Fourteenth, Fifteenth	19 September 2024	9781405965255	

=== Other publications ===
These books are not part of the New Series Adventures but are still published by BBC Books and feature the ninth, tenth, eleventh and twelfth Doctors.

1. The Doctor Who Stories (2009)
  - A book containing fourteen stories, with one of each previously appearing in each fourteen volumes of the Doctor Who Files series (published by BBC Children's Books), and another, previously unpublished, story.
2. The Weeping Angels (2010)
  - A book published by BBC Children's Books containing two new stories and several activity items (such as stickers).
3. The Angel's Kiss (2012)
  - The story starts slightly before "The Angels Take Manhattan", and reinvents the episode from River Song's point of view. It was released exclusively as an ebook. The story is also available to download in audio form via the BBC website AudioGO.
4. Summer Falls (2013)
  - A book written by the character Amy Pond and featured in the episode "The Bells of Saint John". It was released exclusively as an ebook. The story is also available to download in audio form via the BBC Website AudioGO.
5. The Devil in the Smoke (2013)
  - A book featuring the adventures of Madame Vastra, Jenny and Strax, the crime-busting, alien-fighting trio. It was released exclusively as an ebook. The story is also available to download in audio form via the BBC website AudioGO.
6. The Official Cookbook (2016)
7. Whographica: An infographic guide to space and time (2016)
8. The Whoniverse (2016)

== Notes ==
- ^aThe Clockwise Man: page 120, The Monsters Inside: page 136, Winner Takes All: page 22, The Deviant Strain: page 162, The Stealers of Dreams: page 113
- ^bThe Story of Martha itself was written by Dan Abnett. However the four short stories that alternate with the main plot were written by David Roden, Steve Lockley and Paul Lewis, Robert Shearman, and Simon Jowett.
- ^cAlthough the Doctor is not travelling with a TV series companion, the blurb of these books indicates that he has a temporary companion for that story: June in The Slitheen Excursion, Nikki in Judgement of the Judoon, and Emma in The Sontaran Games.

== See also ==
- Lists of books based on Doctor Who
- List of Torchwood novels and audio books
- List of Doctor Who novelists
