= The Doctor Trap =

2008 novel by Simon Messingham

- Author: Simon Messingham
- Series: Doctor Who book: New Series Adventures
- Release number: 26
- Subject: Featuring: Tenth Doctor; Donna Noble
- Set in: Period between "Planet of the Ood" and "Turn Left"
- Publisher: BBC Books
- Publication date: 4 September 2008
- ISBN: 1-84607-558-0
- Preceded by: Ghosts of India
- Followed by: Shining Darkness

The Doctor Trap is a BBC Books original novel written by Simon Messingham and based on the long-running science fiction television series Doctor Who. It features the Tenth Doctor and Donna Noble. It was published on 4 September 2008 alongside Ghosts of India and Shining Darkness.

== Audiobook ==
An abridged audiobook was released as a double CD by BBC Audio on the same day as the novel. It was read by actor Russell Tovey, who played Midshipman Alonso Frame in the television stories "Voyage of the Damned", and "The End of Time". The audio was poorly received, critically.
