= The Many Hands =

2008 novel by Dale Smith

- Author: Dale Smith
- Series: Doctor Who book: New Series Adventures
- Release number: 24
- Subject: Featuring: Tenth Doctor; Martha Jones
- Set in: Period between "The Family of Blood" and "Utopia"
- Publisher: BBC Books
- Publication date: 10 April 2008
- ISBN: 1846074223
- Preceded by: Snowglobe 7
- Followed by: Ghosts of India

The Many Hands is a BBC Books original novel written by Dale Smith and based on the long-running science fiction television series Doctor Who. It features the Tenth Doctor and Martha Jones. It was published on 10 April 2008, alongside Martha in the Mirror and Snowglobe 7.

== Synopsis ==
The book opens with the mysterious arrival of a baby in Edinburgh, 1773. The scene shifts to the city fifteen years earlier.

The Doctor and Martha are confronted by the walking dead, first a solitary figure which attacks a stagecoach containing Benjamin Franklin, then by an army of the creatures rising from the putrid waters of the Nor' Loch. The British soldiers under Captain McAllister who have arrested the Doctor find themselves following his lead. Part of this is the soldier's desire to save innocent civilians endangered by the creatures.

Meanwhile, at the Surgeon's Hall, Martha has met a couple of physicians, Alexander Monro, senior and junior, who apparently brought the first corpse back to life. They lock her in a small room with dozens of hands, disembodied but disturbingly active.

The Doctor deduces the presence of a modular alien and discovers its sinister intentions.

Benjamin Franklin reappears in the final chapter, set in 1771, meeting Alexander Monro, who reclaims the hand he gave Franklin years before, the last one on Earth.

== Notes ==
- The Alexander Monro featured in the book is Alexander Monro primus. The clone Alexander is based upon his son, Alexander Monro secundus, and the implication at the end of another Alexander clone is a reference to Alexander Monro tertius, the original's grandson. As stated in the book, all three were anatomists at the University of Edinburgh.

== Audiobook ==
An abridged audiobook was released on 19 February 2009, read by David Troughton, who is the son of Second Doctor actor, Patrick Troughton, and who also played Professor Hobbes in "Midnight".

== See also ==
- Whoniverse
