= Trevor Baxendale =

British writer

Trevor Baxendale is a writer. His first Doctor Who novel The Janus Conjunction was published by BBC Books in 1998. He has also written novels for Torchwood and Blake's 7, as well as short stories, comic strips and audio drama scripts.

== Bibliography ==
=== Novels ===
==== Doctor Who ====
- The Janus Conjunction (1998)
- Coldheart (2000)
- Eater of Wasps (2001)
- Fear of the Dark (2002, republished 2013)
- The Deadstone Memorial (2004)
- Wishing Well (2007)
- Prisoner of the Daleks (2009, republished 2014)
- Deep Time (2015)

==== Torchwood ====
- Something in the Water (2008)
- The Undertaker's Gift (2009)

==== Blake's 7 ====
- Criminal Intent (November 2014)
- The Clone Masters: The Rule of Death (October 2022)

=== Audiobooks ===
==== Doctor Who ====
- Terror of the Master (Masterful Limited Edition) (2021)

==== Blake's 7 ====
- Outlaw (2019)
- The Rule of Death (September 2021)

=== Game books ===
- Doctor Who: War of the Robots (Decide your Destiny) (October 2007)
- Doctor Who: The Dragon King (Decide your Destiny) (March 2008)
- Doctor Who: Claws of the Macra (Decide you Destiny) (April 2010)
- Doctor Who: Terror Moon (Choose the Future) (October 2016)

=== For younger readers ===
- Doctor Who - The Darksmith Legacy (book 6): The Game of Death (May 2009)
- Doctor Who: Heart of Stone (February 2011)

=== Adaptations ===
- The Sarah Jane Adventures: Judoon Afternoon (based on the television script Prisoner of the Judoon by Phil Ford) (2010)
- The Sarah Jane Adventures: Painting Peril (based on the television script Mona Lisa's Revenge by Phil Ford) (2010)
- The Sarah Jane Adventures: The Haunted House (based on the television script The Eternity Trap by Phil Ford) (2010)
- The Sarah Jane Adventures: Blathereen Dream (based on the television script The Gift by Rupert Laight) (2010)
- Doctor Who: The Eleventh Hour (based on the television script by Steven Moffat) (2011)
- Doctor Who: The Time of Angels (based on the television script by Steven Moffat) (2011)
- Savitri's Tale and Other Heroic Stories (authorised adaptation from Anthony Horowitz's Myths and Legends) (2012)
- The Dragon's Tale and other Beastly Stories (authorised adaptation from Anthony Horowitz's Myths and Legends) (2012)

=== Short stories ===
- The Queen of Eros (Doctor Who - Short Trips and Side Steps) (2000)
- Ash ((Doctor Who - Short Trips: A Universe of Terrors) (2003)
- Mortal Thoughts (Doctor Who - Short Trips: Life Science) (2004)
- The Ghost's Story (Doctor Who - Short Trips: Repercussions) (2004)
- Making History (Doctor Who - Short Trips: A Day in the Life) (2005)
- Mars (Doctor Who - Short Trips: The Solar System) (2005)
- Dr Cadabra (Doctor Who - Short Trips: The Ghosts of Christmas) (2007)
- Harm's Way (Torchwood Magazine issues 8, 9 & 10)) (August 2008)
- The Keep Killing Andy (Torchwood Magazine issue 19) (December 2009)
- Requiem (Torchwood Magazine - issue 25) (December 2010)
- Plant Life (Torchwood Yearbook) (2008)
- The Woman in the Sand (Beside the Seaside anthology) (2014)
- A Life Unwanted (forthcoming)
- Contagion (Blake's 7 - Heroes) (2017)
- The Pythagoras Problem (Doctor Who - Star Tales) (2019)
- The Last Stand of Soolin - (The Blakes 7 Annual 1982)
- Asset - (The Blakes 7 Annual 2024)
- Child of Gauda Prime - (Blakes 7 Magazine issue 24)

=== Audio dramas ===
- Doctor Who: The Dark Flame (2003)
- Professor Bernice Summerfield and the Draconian Rage (2003)
- Doctor Who: Something Inside (2005)
- Highlander: The Lesson (April 2009)
- Robin Hood: Friendly Fire (May 2009)
- Blake's 7: Scimitar (November 2014)
- Blake's 7: Funeral on Kalion (Crossfire Part 2) (January 2018)
- Blake's 7: Refuge (Crossfire Part 3) (April 2018)
- Blake's 7: Damage Control (Restoration Part 1) (January 2019)
- Blake's 7: Hyperion (Restoration Part 2) (November 2019)
- Blake's 7: Parasite (Restoration Part 3) (February 2020)
- Blake's 7: Imperium (Restoration Part 3) (February 2020)
- The Worlds of Blake's 7 - Avalon (Volume 1): Black Water (April 2021)
- The Worlds of Blake's 7 - Heroes And Villains: The Amagon Queen (May 2022)
- The Worlds of Blake's 7 - After The War: Andromeda One (November 2022)
- The War Master - Solitary Confinement: The Kicker (June 2023)
- The Tenth Doctor Chronicles - Defender of the Earth: The Thing in the Forest (November 2023)

=== Comics ===
- Doctor Who Adventures - BBC Magazines (64 issues between 2007-2012)
- The Time Sickness (The Official Doctor Who Annual 2009)
- The Vortex Code (The Official Doctor Who Annual 2010)
- The Grey Hole (The Official Doctor Who Annual 2011)
- Monster Hunt (Sarah Jane Adventures website 2009)
- Return of the Krulius (Sarah Jane Adventures website 2009)
- Defending Bannerman Road (Sarah Jane Adventures website 2010)

=== Other work ===
- The Monster Hunt (Interactive game, audio story and comic - The Sarah Jane Adventures website) (2009)
