= The Silent Stars Go By (Abnett novel) =

2011 novel by Dan Abnett

- First edition
- Author: Dan Abnett
- Series: Doctor Who book: New Series Adventures
- Release number: 42
- Subject: Featuring: Eleventh Doctor; Amy Pond; Rory Williams
- Publisher: BBC Books
- Publication date: 29 September 2011
- Pages: 304

The Silent Stars Go By is a hardback Doctor Who novel written by Dan Abnett for the BBC Books New Series Adventures line. The novel features the Eleventh Doctor, Amy Pond, and Rory Williams and sees the return of the Ice Warriors. The novel was re-released in 2013 in paperback in celebration of the fiftieth anniversary of Doctor Who, with a different front cover.

== Plot ==
Instead of returning Amy and Rory to Leadworth for Christmas as he had promised, the Doctor accidentally lands the TARDIS on an Earth-like planet during winter. While Rory returns to the TARDIS to get a heavier coat, the Doctor and Amy meet the inhabitants of the planet, called Morphans, who capture them as they are convinced the Doctor's psychic paper is a conjure which is banned by their religion. A young woman named Bel Flurrish believes they are connected to her missing sister Vesta, who disappeared the previous night. The Doctor denies that they know anything about Vesta and gains Bel's trust; he uses his sonic screwdriver to unlock their cage and the three sneak out from the council of Morphans to look for Vesta. Bel tells the Doctor that they are colonists on the planet, named Hereafter, from Earth. The past few years the winters have grown colder, and this year livestock has disappeared in addition to Vesta, suggesting that there is something out there which is eating them for food. The Doctor, Amy, and Bel find they have been followed by a young Morphan named Samewell Crook, who chastises Bel for releasing the Doctor and Amy as he believes her sister will be found by the council, and threatens to go back and report the incident. Because of this, the Doctor decides he will allow Samewell to come with them. They come across footprints intersecting with another set of footprints and soon find blood in the snow; however, this belongs to a sheep, as Samewell soon finds a sheep bone which he easily recognises.

Rory, meanwhile, finds the Doctor and Amy gone and glimpses menacing figures in the distance which he runs away from. He runs into a group of Morphans, who are also looking for Vesta and who plan to take him captive. However, they see a "green thing" which the Morphans attempt to fight, but defeats them with deadly energy blasts, and Rory escapes. Rory eventually takes refuge in an abandoned building, but an unknown figure hits him over the head with a mallet and knocks him out. When he regains consciousness Rory discovers that it is Vesta Flurrish, and gains her trust. Vesta tells him she was going to put flowers on her father's grave that morning when she ran into one of the "green things" and took shelter in the building. A Morphan finds them and brings them back to the council, who are initially suspicious of Rory, but they accept him.

The Doctor, Amy, Bel, and Samewell see a spaceship-like object in the sky, and the Doctor explains that an invasion of the plane has been going on for quite a while. One of the "green things", which the Doctor identifies as an Ice Warrior, appears. The Doctor interferes with their weapons with his sonic screwdriver, giving them time to escape. They take refuge in a small building, where the Doctor explains to Amy that the Ice Warriors are probably seeking a new home as their home planet, Mars, is gone, as is the Earth and the Solar System. Amy is separated and then attacked by rat-like creatures; the Doctor uses a high-pitched sound from his screwdriver to render them unconscious and explains they are genetically engineered rats made by the Morphans' terraforming system and are responsible for the dead livestock. Exploring the terraforming plant, the Doctor finds a device which is able to transport holograms of them to the assembly hall when Rory, Vesta, and the other Morphans are. He tells Rory his plan: to reset the terraforming plants which will restore Hereafter's climate and drive the Ice Warriors out. However, the terraforming system is very complicated and the Doctor believes the "Guide" the Morphans speak of as their religious figure may be referring to a guide for the terraforming. Amy, Bel, and Samewell escape from the Ice Warriors who interrupted them, but they hold and interrogate the Doctor. He convinces them that what they are doing is not honorable, a trait they value. Meanwhile, Rory discovers he and Vesta were not talking about the same thing earlier; she did not run away from an Ice Warrior but a monster. The Doctor realises that the Warriors' sabotage of the terraforming system has led to the creation of this "transhuman".

A transhuman orders the Morphans to let him see the Guide, and the Doctor's hologram appears and reveals that the Morphans have essentially been preparing Hereafter for their ancestors: elite people who believed they were destined to live and are in suspended animation in the terraforming plant, waiting for the Morphans to prepare the planet for them. The Doctor and the transhuman reveal that once this is done, the Morphans will be eaten by these people. Transhumans and Ice Warriors bring Amy, Bel, and Samewell to the Doctor, but the two species turn against each other. As they are fighting the Doctor instructs Rory to let him view the Guide's information, and he uses the information to stop the transhumans. He convinces the Ice Warriors to leave honorably, and offers a planet nearby he knows they will settle in. Before returning to the TARDIS to take Amy and Rory home for Christmas, he informs the Morphans that he reset the Guide to make it more user-friendly, and they will have the option to choose when they let their ancestors out, if at all.

== Production ==
Dan Abnett announced he was writing the book in July 2011.

== Reception ==
Will Salmon of SFX gave the book four out of five stars, labelling it as "tells a spooky monster story that’s big on atmosphere, if lacking in originality". Den of Geek's Mark Harrison gave it three out of five stars, questioning whether the extra page length was necessary for the story, though he thought it was "very well-written". He praised Abnett's description of the Ice Warriors, but he thought it "unfortunate...that the story itself runs out of steam after a few early encounters with the green giants".
