= Snowglobe 7 =

2008 novel by Mike Tucker

- Author: Mike Tucker
- Series: Doctor Who book: New Series Adventures
- Release number: 23
- Subject: Featuring: Tenth Doctor; Martha Jones
- Set in: Period between "The Family of Blood" and "Utopia"
- Publisher: BBC Books
- Publication date: 10 April 2008
- ISBN: 1-84607-421-5
- Preceded by: Martha in the Mirror
- Followed by: The Many Hands

Snowglobe 7 is a BBC Books original novel written by Mike Tucker and based on the long-running science fiction television series Doctor Who. It features the Tenth Doctor and Martha Jones. It was published on 10 April 2008, alongside Martha in the Mirror and The Many Hands.

== Synopsis ==
Snowglobe 7 is set in 2099 when the world's global warming has become a great problem. Snowglobe 7 was one of the buildings set up to contain sheets of ice to preserve them against global warming. It is situated in Dubai. Due to Snowglobes being extremely expensive to maintain, many were sold off as visitor attractions. Snowglobe 7 was one of only three left that were purely scientific. The section of ice within it, unknown to the Humans, contained the last Gappa, bizarre, blood-thirsty aliens that look like a cross between a spider and a monkey with a massive, fleshy nose. While Martha tries to help with an unknown disease spreading through the dome, the Doctor investigates. The Gappa killed some humans on maintenance and used their bodies as hosts for future Gappa. Service robot Twelve collapsed several of the tunnels in the ice of Snowglobe 7 in an attempt to kill the Gappa, but failed. The Doctor detonated the engine of a ship that had crashed in the ice thousands of years ago, killing the Gappa but destroying the Snowglobe and melting the ice.

== Audiobook ==
The audiobook was read by Georgia Tennant, who is the daughter of Fifth Doctor actor, Peter Davison, wife of David Tennant who played the Tenth Doctor and who also played his daughter Jenny in "The Doctor's Daughter".

== See also ==
- Whoniverse
