= Doctor Who: The Tenth Doctor Adventures =

Audio drama

The Tenth Doctor Adventures

Big Finish Productions audio drama
- Series: Doctor Who
- Featuring: Tenth Doctor
- Executive producers: Jason Haigh-Ellery; Nicholas Briggs
- Music: Howard Carter
- Release date: May 2016 – present

The Tenth Doctor Adventures, announced in October 2015, is a Big Finish Productions audio play series based on the television series Doctor Who. It sees the return of David Tennant as the Tenth Doctor and Catherine Tate as Donna Noble. The first trilogy of stories was released in May 2016. In November 2017 a second volume was released, featuring the Tenth Doctor and Rose Tyler. A third volume was released in May 2019, with Tate again reprising her role as Donna.

== Cast ==
List indicator

This section includes characters who will appear or have appeared in at least one season.

- A green cell indicates the actor is a main cast member.
- A red cell indicates the actor is a recurring cast member.
- A light blue cell indicates the actor is a guest or special guest cast member.

| Actor | Character | Appearances | | | | | | | | | | | |
| Actor | Character | Volumes | | | | Specials | | Out of Time | | | Dalek Universe | | |
| Actor | Character | 1 | 2 | 3 | 4 | TDRS | TDCC | 1 | 2 | 3 | 1 | 2 | 3 |
|---|---|---|---|---|---|---|---|---|---|---|---|---|---|
| David Tennant | The Doctor | ✓ | ✓ | ✓ | ✓ | ✓ | ✓ | ✓ | ✓ | ✓ | ✓ | ✓ | ✓ |
| Tom Baker | The Doctor | | | | | | | ✓ | | | | | |
| Peter Davison | The Doctor | | | | | ✓ | | | ✓ | | | | |
| Colin Baker | The Doctor | | | | | ✓ | | | | ✓ | | | |
| Catherine Tate | Donna Noble | ✓ | | ✓ | | | | | | | | | |
| Billie Piper | Rose Tyler | | ✓ | | | | | | | | | | |
| Anjli Mohindra | Rani Chandra | | | | ✓ | | | | | | | | |
| Alex Kingston | River Song | | | | | ✓ | | | | | | | ✓ |
| John Leeson | K9 | | | | | | ✓ | | | | | | |
| Louise Jameson | Leela | | | | | | ✓ | | | | | | |
| Sarah Sutton | Nyssa | | | | | | ✓ | | | | | | |
| Sophie Aldred | Ace | | | | | | ✓ | | | | | | |
| Jane Slavin | Anya Kingdom | | | | | | | | | | ✓ | ✓ | ✓ |
| Joe Sims | Mark Seven | | | | | | | | | | ✓ | ✓ | |
| Kevin McNally | Merrick Kingdom | | | | | | | | | | ✓ | ✓ | |
| Nicholas Briggs | Ice Warriors | | ✓ | | | | | | | | | | |
| Nicholas Briggs | Judoon | | | ✓ | | | | | | | | | |
| Nicholas Briggs | Daleks | | | | | | | ✓ | | | ✓ | ✓ | ✓ |
| Nicholas Briggs | Cybermen | | | | | | | | ✓ | | | | |
| Nicholas Briggs | Mechonoids | | | | | | | | | | ✓ | | |

=== Notable Guests ===
==== Doctor Who characters ====
- Camille Coduri as Jackie Tyler
- Jacqueline King as Sylvia Noble
- Bernard Cribbins as Wilfred Mott
- Terry Molloy as Davros

==== Other ====
- Chris Jarman as The Pastor & Vesht
- Gemma Whelan as The Nun
- Blake Ritson as Rudolph & Major McLinn
- Nina Toussaint-White as Mariah Six
- Mark Gatiss as George Sheldrake & Joseph Delon
- Noma Dumezweni as Rodekka
- Joseph Millson as Colonel Keelan

== Episodes ==
=== Volumes ===
==== Volume 1 (2016) ====
| No. | Title | Directed by | Written by | Featuring | Released |
|---|---|---|---|---|---|
| 1 | "Technophobia" | Nicholas Briggs | Matt Fitton | Tenth Doctor, Donna Noble | May 2016 |
| 2 | "Time Reaver" | Nicholas Briggs | Jenny T Colgan | Tenth Doctor, Donna Noble | May 2016 |
| 3 | "Death and the Queen" | Nicholas Briggs | James Goss | Tenth Doctor, Donna Noble | May 2016 |
Paying a visit to Earth in Donna's not-too-distant future, the Doctor and Donna discover an alien invasion that seeks to destroy humanity by restricting their intelligence. An attempt to purchase a new part for the TARDIS reveals a trade in a dangerous weapon. Donna accepts a proposal from a prince, but soon learns that her new country has a deal with an ancient alien race that will require her to be sacrificed.

==== Volume 2 (2017) ====
| No. | Title | Directed by | Written by | Featuring | Released |
|---|---|---|---|---|---|
| 1 | "Infamy of the Zaross" | Nicholas Briggs | John Dorney | Tenth Doctor, Rose Tyler, Jackie Tyler | November 2017 |
| 2 | "The Sword of the Chevalier" | Nicholas Briggs | Guy Adams | Tenth Doctor, Rose | November 2017 |
| 3 | "Cold Vengeance" | Nicholas Briggs | Matt Fitton | Tenth Doctor, Rose, Ice Warriors | November 2017 |
Jackie calls in the Doctor and Rose when aliens attack Norwich, but the Doctor swiftly realises this invasion is more than it seems. The Doctor and Rose meet the Chevalier d'Éon and investigate alien slavers. A visit to a frozen food storage asteroid reveals the presence of the Ice Warriors.

==== Volume 3 (2019) ====
| No. | Title | Directed by | Written by | Featuring | Released |
|---|---|---|---|---|---|
| 1 | "No Place" | Nicholas Briggs | James Goss | Tenth Doctor, Donna, Sylvia Noble, Wilfred Mott | May 2019 |
| 2 | "One Mile Down" | Nicholas Briggs | Jenny T Colgan | Tenth Doctor, Donna, Judoon | May 2019 |
| 3 | "The Creeping Death" | Nicholas Briggs | Roy Gill | Tenth Doctor, Donna | May 2019 |

==== Volume 4 ====
| No. | Title | Directed by | Written by | Featuring | Released |
|---|---|---|---|---|---|
| 1 | "The Hidden" | Ken Bentley | Roy Gill | Tenth Doctor, Rani Chandra | August 2027 |
| 2 | "Empress of the Universe" | Ken Bentley | Lizzie Hopley | Tenth Doctor, Rani Chandra | October 2027 |
| 3 | "In Effects" | Ken Bentley | John Dorney | Tenth Doctor, Rani Chandra | December 2027 |
| 4 | TBA | TBD | TBD | Tenth Doctor | February 2028 |
| 5 | TBA | TBD | TBD | Tenth Doctor | April 2028 |
| 6 | TBA | TBD | TBD | Tenth Doctor | June 2028 |
| 7 | TBA | TBD | TBD | Tenth Doctor | August 2028 |
| 8 | TBA | TBD | TBD | Tenth Doctor | October 2028 |
| 9 | TBA | TBD | TBD | Tenth Doctor | December 2028 |
| 10 | TBA | TBD | TBD | Tenth Doctor | February 2029 |
| 11 | TBA | TBD | TBD | Tenth Doctor | April 2029 |
| 12 | TBA | TBD | TBD | Tenth Doctor | June 2029 |

=== Out of Time (2020–2022) ===
| No. | Title | Directed by | Written by | Featuring | Released |
|---|---|---|---|---|---|
| 1 | "Out of Time" | Nicholas Briggs | Matt Fitton | Tenth Doctor, Fourth Doctor, Daleks | August 2020 |
| 2 | "The Gates of Hell" | Ken Bentley | David Llewellyn | Tenth Doctor, Fifth Doctor, Cybermen | June 2021 |
| 3 | "Wink" | Ken Bentley | Lisa McMullin | Tenth Doctor, Sixth Doctor, Weeping Angels | June 2022 |
The Fourth and Tenth Doctors visit the other-dimensional Cathedral of Contemplation just in time to face a Dalek invasion. The Fifth and Tenth Doctors come together to face a Cyberman invasion of Earth. The Sixth and Tenth Doctors visit a planet where the multiple local suns mean that the residents never developed the sense of sight, just as Weeping Angels attack the planet.

=== Dalek Universe (2021) ===
==== Prologue (2021) ====
Note that, while this instalment is not directly part of The Tenth Doctor Adventures (as it focuses almost entirely on the Fourth Doctor and his companions), the events that take place within it are canon to the Dalek Universe story arc.

| No. | Title | Directed by | Written by | Featuring | Released |
|---|---|---|---|---|---|
| – | "The Dalek Protocol" | Nicholas Briggs | Nicholas Briggs | Fourth Doctor, Leela, K9, Anya Kingdom, Mark Seven, Daleks, Exxilons, Bellal | April 2021 |

==== Episodes (2021) ====
| No. | Title | Directed by | Written by | Featuring | Released |
|---|---|---|---|---|---|
Volume 1
| 1 | "Buying Time" | Ken Bentley | John Dorney | Tenth Doctor, Anya Kingdom, Mark Seven, George Sheldrake, The Nun | April 2021 |
| 2 | "The Wrong Woman" | Ken Bentley | John Dorney | Tenth Doctor, Anya, Mark, George Sheldrake, The Nun | April 2021 |
| 3 | "The House of Kingdom" | Ken Bentley | Andrew Smith | Tenth Doctor, Anya, Mark, Merrick Kingdom, Mechonoids | April 2021 |
Volume 2
| 4 | "Cycle of Destruction" | Ken Bentley | Roy Gill | Tenth Doctor, Anya, Mark, Daleks | July 2021 |
| 5 | "The Trojan Dalek" | Ken Bentley | John Dorney | Tenth Doctor, Anya, Mark, Daleks | July 2021 |
| 6 | "The Lost" | Ken Bentley | Rob Valentine | Tenth Doctor, Anya, Mark, Merrick Kingdom, The Lost | July 2021 |
Volume 3
| 7 | "The First Son" | Ken Bentley | Lizzie Hopley | Tenth Doctor, Anya, River Song, Movellans, Daleks | October 2021 |
| 8 | "The Dalek Defence" | Ken Bentley | Matt Fitton | Tenth Doctor, Anya, Davros, Daleks, Movellans | October 2021 |
| 9 | "The Triumph of Davros" | Ken Bentley | Matt Fitton | Tenth Doctor, Anya, Davros, Daleks, Movellans | October 2021 |

=== The Tenth Doctor and River Song (2020) ===
| No. | Title | Directed by | Written by | Featuring | Released |
|---|---|---|---|---|---|
| 1 | "Expiry Dating" | Nicholas Briggs | James Goss | Tenth Doctor, River Song, Fifth Doctor, Sixth Doctor | November 2020 |
| 2 | "Precious Annihilation" | Nicholas Briggs | Lizzie Hopley | Tenth Doctor, River | November 2020 |
| 3 | "Ghosts" | Nicholas Briggs | Jonathan Morris | Tenth Doctor, River | November 2020 |

=== Tenth Doctor, Classic Companions (2022) ===
| No. | Title | Directed by | Written by | Featuring | Released |
|---|---|---|---|---|---|
| 1 | "Splinters" | Helen Goldwyn | John Dorney | Tenth Doctor, K9, Leela | September 2022 |
| 2 | "The Stuntman" | Helen Goldwyn | Lizzie Hopley | Tenth Doctor, K9, Nyssa | September 2022 |
| 3 | "Quantum of Axos" | Helen Goldwyn | Roy Gill | Tenth Doctor, K9, Ace, Axos | September 2022 |

== Awards and nominations ==
Name of the award ceremony, year presented, category, nominee(s) of the award, and the result of the nomination
| Award ceremony | Year | Category | Work(s) | Result | Ref. |
|---|---|---|---|---|---|
| Audie Awards | 2017 | Best Audio Drama | Death and the Queen | Nominated | |
| BBC Audio Drama Awards | 2017 | Best Online Only Audio Drama | Death and the Queen | Shortlisted | |
| Scribe Awards | 2018 | Best Audio | Cold Vengeance | Nominated | |
| Scribe Awards | 2020 | Best Audio | The Creeping Death | Won | |
| Scribe Awards | 2021 | Best Audio | Out of Time | Won | |
| Audio and Radio Industry Awards | 2021 | Best Fictional Storytelling | Out of Time | Nominated | |
