= James Goss (producer) =

English writer and producer

James Goss (born 1974) is an English writer and producer, known both for his work in cult TV spin-off media, including tie-in novels and audio stories for Doctor Who and Torchwood, and for his fictional works beyond established universes.

== Doctor Who ==
=== Online content ===
In 2000, Goss was made a BBC senior content producer and put in charge of the BBC's official Doctor Who website. Originally the site was part of the BBC's Cult TV website. Goss slowly expanded the content to include Buffy the Vampire Slayer, Farscape, The Simpsons, 24 and Doctor Who. He was subsequently voted Number 19 in TV Cream's 2004 poll of Top 50 Media Movers and Shakers.

With the return of Doctor Who, the Cult site was slowly wound down in order to concentrate solely on the show. Goss moved to BBC Wales to oversee the production of the new show's web site, expanding the contents to include cast and crew interviews, games and spin-off sites based on the broadcast episodes. His aim was to construct a whole world beyond the show that viewers could get further involved in, notably employing graphic designer Lee Binding for front pages and site design, and writer Joseph Lidster for the spin-off sites' fictional content. Sequence, a UK based creative and experience design agency, were also responsible for all of the Doctor Who series extended-fiction games, experiences and many of the associated websites. Goss also produced the video clip "krill-loop" for a tie-in website.

In 2020, he wrote the animated series Daleks!.

=== Television, radio and DVD ===
Having produced previous Doctor Who web only animations (such as Scream of the Shalka) and Shada, in 2005 Goss produced the animations of two missing episodes of The Invasion. The animation, developed by Cosgrove Hall, was originally intended as web-only content but was later added to the DVD release and went on to be voted best DVD special feature in the 2006 Doctor Who Magazine awards.

In 2006, Goss developed and produced The Infinite Quest, a Doctor Who animation shown on BBC One and CBBC in 2007. He was also producer of the special features for the DVD release. He has since produced DVD extra features for further 2 Entertain Doctor Who releases, including The Chase, The Keys of Marinus, The Masque of Mandragora, and The Trial Of A Time Lord.

In 2006, he appeared in an episode of Doctor Who Confidential.

In 2013 Scream of the Shalka was released on DVD with extras which include James Goss presenting a documentary on how the series came to be made and appearing in a documentary about the BBC cult website. He also produced a series of 5 (short) documentaries called Doctor Forever which appeared across Doctor Who DVD Special Edition releases in 2013. He was also involved in producing a series of documentaries for the 50th Anniversary of Doctor Who which in 2013 were first shown on BBC America and subsequently on Watch in the UK.

=== Books ===
In 2007, he contributed to the Doctor Who short-story collection Short Trips: Snapshots. His first book, Almost Perfect, a tie-in to the Doctor Who spin-off series Torchwood, was released in October 2008 and was followed by two more Torchwood novels and Bad Blood, a novel based on the TV series Being Human.

Goss's Dead Air, read by David Tennant, was voted 2010 Audiobook Of The Year.

His Eleventh Doctor audiobook The Hounds of Artemis was given away free with a February 2011 issue of The Guardian. It is read by Matt Smith and Clare Corbett. His books Dead of Winter (Doctor Who) and First Born (Torchwood) were both nominated for the 2012 British Fantasy Society Awards. He has written numerous stories produced by Big Finish Productions in their Doctor Who related ranges.

In 2013, BBC Books published Goss's short novel Summer Falls, purportedly written by Doctor Who character Amelia (Pond) Williams. In September 2014 his Twelfth Doctor novel Blood Cell was published.

In addition to the three Torchwood novels and Doctor Who novels, James Goss is the co-author, with Steve Tribe, of The Dalek Handbook (2011), Doctor Who: A History of the Universe in 100 Objects (2012) and The Doctor: His Lives and Times (2013). In 2014 he contributed to The Shakespeare Notebooks.

In 2015 his novel Haterz, about a man making the internet a better place one murder at a time, was published in the UK by Solaris Books and launched at the Forbidden Planet Megastore in London on 12 March 2015 with a book reading and signing by the author.

In 2016 James Goss's novel, What She Does Next Will Astound You, which tied into Class, was published.

Goss has written three novelisations based on Fourth Doctor stories by Douglas Adams. The first two, City of Death (2015) and The Pirate Planet (2017) were based on the serials of the same titles, which had not been adapted for the original Target Books series. (An abridged edition of City of Death was released in 2018 under the classic Target branding.) The third, Doctor Who and the Krikkitmen (2018) was based on an unproduced film script later reworked as Life, the Universe and Everything. An audiobook of The Pirate Planet has also been released, read by Jon Culshaw utilizing his well-known imitation of the Fourth Doctor. His adaptation of The Pirate Planet won a Scribe Award in 2018. Additionally, in 2023 Goss published The Giggle, a fourteenth Doctor novelisation (based on the third 60th anniversary special) as part of the Doctor Who Target Novels – New Era collection. The novel is purportedly narrated by the Doctor Who character The Toymaker.

== Theatre ==
Goss's stage play Dirk, adapted with fellow student Arvind Ethan David from the Douglas Adams book Dirk Gently's Holistic Detective Agency, having been first performed (in its authorised form) in 1995, has been staged around the world. In 2007 it won "Best Adaptation" in the 28th LA Weekly Theater Awards. The play was published in 2016 by Samuel French, Play Publishers. It has been performed by SUP Theatre Company in Southampton 30 Jan - 3 Feb 2018.

He wrote the play 7 Spies At The Casino about the making of the 1967 film Casino Royale, which was performed at the Edinburgh Festival Fringe in August 2007.

James Goss has also written a play about the true story of the "terribly nice friendship" between Mr Peter Cushing and Sir Christopher Lee, forged during their Hammer Horror careers (see Hammer Film Productions). The play, called ‘The Gentlemen of Horror’, was first performed on 27 November 2013 at the Woolwich Grand Theatre. It was performed in the summer of 2014 at the Camden Fringe where it received favourable reviews.

== Other work ==
Goss blogged from the Edinburgh Fringe for The Guardian's web site in 2007 and wrote a series of guest blogs about archive television for the AOL UK TV web site in 2009-2010.

As mentioned above, Goss wrote three novels for the Doctor Who spin-off series Torchwood. In addition, in the Torchwood range, he wrote four short stories, published in the Torchwood Magazine; two audiobooks, Department X and Ghost Train; and two radio plays both broadcast on BBC radio 4; Golden Age on 2 July 2009 and The House of the Dead on 13 July 2011. In 2015 he became the producer of a new series of Torchwood audio stories to be produced by Big Finish Productions ( Torchwood (Big Finish series) ).

From 2011 to 2012, Goss co-produced with Joseph Lidster, the Big Finish Productions' range of Dark Shadows audio dramas. In 2014 he also produced the New Adventures of Bernice Summerfield for Big Finish Productions.

Goss has written three historical murder mysteries in which the Lady Serpent, an assassin, solves crime, as well as committing it, in Ancient Egypt. These stories are published in e-book format by Endeavour Press.

In 2026, he contributed a short story ("The Death Trap") to The Thirteenth Floor Anthology (Rebellion 2026, ISBN 9781837866038)

== Selected bibliography ==
Novels, Audiobooks & ebooks

Haterz (2015)

- The Lady Serpent Series
  - The Race of Scorpions (2012)
  - Poison Seed (2013)
  - Blood and Sand (2013)
- Torchwood
  - Almost Perfect (2008)
  - Risk Assessment (2009)
  - Department X (2011)
  - Ghost Train (2011)
  - First Born (2011)
- Doctor Who
  - Dead Air (2010)
  - Dead of Winter (2011)
  - The Hounds of Artemis (2011)
  - The Art of Death (2012)
  - Summer Falls and Other Stories (2013)
  - The Blood Cell (2014)
  - City of Death (2015)
  - The Pirate Planet (2017)
  - Now We Are Six Hundred: A Collection of Time Lord Verse (2017)
  - Doctor Who and the Krikkitmen (2018)
  - The Giggle (2023)
- Being Human
  - Bad Blood (2010)
- Class
  - What She Does Next Will Astound You (2016)

Radio Dramas

- Torchwood
  - Golden Age (2009)
  - The House of the Dead (2011) (see The Lost Files (Torchwood))

Audio dramas

- Doctor Who
  - The Time Museum (2012)
  - The Last Post (Doctor Who audio) (2012)
  - The Scorchies (2013)
  - Counter Measures: The Fifth Citadel (2013)
  - Bernice Summerfield Missing Persons: 5.4 The Winning Side (2013)
  - The New Adventures of Bernice Summerfield: The Lights of Skaro (2014)
  - Jago & Litefoot (audio drama series): 7.2 Night of 1000 Stars (2014)
  - Mask of Tragedy (2014)
  - Jago & Litefoot (audio drama series): 8.1 Encore of the Scorchies (2014)
  - The Gods of Winter (2015)
  - The Sins of Winter (2015)
  - Jago & Litefoot (audio drama series): 10.3 The Mourning After (2015)
  - The Diary of River Song 1.3 Signs (2015)
  - Death and the Queen (2016)
  - Doctor Who: Classic Doctors, New Monsters: 1.3 Harvest of the Sycorax (2016)
  - The Diary of River Song 2.3 World Enough and Time (2017)
  - Doctor Who Ninth Doctor Chronicles 1.4 Retail Therapy (2017)
  - The Silent Scream (2017)
  - The War Master 1.3 The Sky Man (2017)
  - The War Master 2.1 Call For the Dead & 2.2 The Glittering Prize (2018)
  - No Place (2019)
  - The Diary of River Song 7.1 Colony of Strangers (2020)
  - Donna Noble: Kidnapped 1.3 The Sorcerer of Albion (2020)
  - The New Adventures of Bernice Summerfield: 6.3 Inertia (2020)
  - Expiry Dating (2020)
  - Masterful! (2021)
  - The War Master 6.1 The Sincerest Form of Flattery & 6.4 Unfinished Business (2021)
- Torchwood
  - Fall to Earth (2015)
  - Ghost Mission (2016) (see Torchwood (Big Finish series))
  - The Torchwood Archive (2016)
  - Corpse Day (2017)
  - The Office of Never Was (2017)
  - The Lives of Captain Jack 1.2 Wednesdays for Beginners and 1.3 One Enchanted Evening (2017)
  - Aliens Among Us episodes 1 - Changes Everything, 2 - Aliens & Sex & Chips & Gravy, and 12 - Herald of the Dawn (2017–18)
  - Goodbye Piccadilly (2018)
  - God Among Us episodes 1 - Future Pain, and 13 - Thoughts & Prayers (2018–19)
  - The Lives of Captain Jack 2.1 Piece of Mind & 2.3 Driving Miss Wells (2019)
  - The Hope (2019)
  - Smashed (2019)
  - Fortitude (2020)
  - The Lives of Captain Jack 3.3 R&J (2020)
  - Torchwood Soho: Parasite (2020)
  - Red Base (2020)
  - The Three Monkeys (2020)
  - Coffee (2021)
  - Gooseberry (2021)
  - The Five People You Kill in Middlesbrough (2021) (co-written with Tim Foley and Tracy-Ann Oberman)
  - Madam, I'm (2021)
  - Empire of Shadows (2021)
  - Curios (2021)
  - Torchwood Soho: Ashenden (2021)
  - The Great Sontaran War (2021)
  - The Red List (2021)
  - Less Majesty (2021) (as part of the Torchwood One: Nightmares boxset)
- Dark Shadows
  - The Doll House (2010)
  - The Poisoned Soul (2011)
  - The Crimson Pearl with Joseph Lidster (2011)
  - The House by the Sea (2012)
  - The Harvest of Souls (2014)
- Blakes 7
  - Three (The Liberator Chronicles Volume 5:3 (2013))
  - Spoils (The Liberator Chronicles 8:3 (2014))
- Iris Wildthyme
  - Comeback of the Scorchies (Wildthyme Reloaded 1(2015))

Short stories

- Torchwood
  - The Last Voyage of Osiris (2009) in Torchwood Magazine Issue 17
  - The Package (2010) in Torchwood Magazine Issue 22
  - The Mind's Eye (2010) Torchwood Magazine Issue 24
  - We All Go Through with Steve Tribe (2011) Torchwood Magazine Issue 25
- Doctor Who
  - Indian Summer in Short Trips: Snapshots (2007)
  - Phoenix in Short Trips: Indefinable Magic (2009)
- The Thirteenth Floor
  - Death Trap in The Thirteenth Floor Anthology, Rebellion 2026

Non Fiction

- The Dalek Handbook with Steve Tribe (2011)
- Doctor Who: A History of the Universe in 100 Objects with Steve Tribe (2012)
- The Doctor: His Lives and Times with Steve Tribe (2013)
- The Shakespeare Notebooks (2014)
