= The Art of Destruction =

2006 novel by Stephen Cole

- Author: Stephen Cole
- Series: Doctor Who book: New Series Adventures
- Release number: 11
- Subject: Featuring: Tenth Doctor; Rose Tyler
- Set in: Period between "The Age of Steel" and "Army of Ghosts"
- Publisher: BBC Books
- Publication date: 21 September 2006
- Pages: 256
- ISBN: 0-563-48651-1
- Preceded by: The Nightmare of Black Island
- Followed by: The Price of Paradise

The Art of Destruction is a BBC Books original novel written by Stephen Cole and based on the long-running science fiction television series Doctor Who. It was published on 21 September 2006 alongside The Nightmare of Black Island and The Price of Paradise. It features the Tenth Doctor and Rose.

== Synopsis ==
The TARDIS arrives in 22nd century Africa, where agri-teams are growing food in the rich soil around a dormant volcano to feed the hungry millions of Earth. However, the time travellers detect an alien signal nearby. As something moves in the volcanic tunnels, the Doctor realises an ancient trap has been triggered. The Doctor and Rose meet Solomon Nabarr and Basel who explain that the Time travellers have just landed right by Mount Tarsus in Chad.

== Audio book ==
An abridged audio book version of The Art of Destruction read by Don Warrington (President in "Rise of the Cybermen") was released in November 2006 (ISBN 1-84607-176-3) by BBC Audiobooks. Also included was a "behind-the-scenes" discussion between the author and reader.

== See also ==
- Whoniverse
