= Time Lord Victorious =

Multiplatform story set within Doctor Who universe

Time Lord Victorious is a multiplatform story set within the British science fiction television series Doctor Who. The story was announced in April 2020. The first installment of the story was released in March 2020, and the final installment was made available in April 2021 as a ticketed live experience. The serialised story is told through a variety of multimedia including audio dramas, comics, books, short stories, immersive experiences, collectables, and an animated series.

The title refers to an alias The Doctor assumed, claiming his supremacy over time, and final victory in the Time War.

== Plot ==
The overall storyline includes events linking back to the Fourth Doctor's era, but essentially begins for the Tenth Doctor just after the events of "The Waters of Mars".

The Doctor's actions on Bowie Base One having created a temporal rift, he travels back to the Dark Times of the universe, where he meets the race known as the Kotturuh, who brought death itself into the universe in the early days of history, either making species mortal or killing them in a matter of hours for nothing more than the Kotturuhs' belief that they would contribute nothing to the future. The Doctor gathers an army of mercenaries and even goes so far as to create a virus based on the Kotturuhs' death touch that gives the entire species a 'lifespan' of fifteen minutes, eventually adopting the 'Time Lord Victorious' title as he tries to stop the Kotturuh's influence on history in the first place.

In the future, the Eighth Doctor discovers various temporal anomalies that he eventually traces back to the Dark Times, and he is forced to accompany a Dalek Time Squad into the past to investigate the source. The Ninth Doctor finds himself in the past while on a trip with Rose, and has to save a group of vampires from a previously-unknown female incarnation of Rassilon. The three Doctors meet about the Kotturuh homeworld, but the Tenth initially assumes that the Eighth and Ninth Doctors are a deception, resulting in the three fleets attacking each other until the Doctors make telepathic contact with each other. The Daleks attempt to steal samples from a Great Vampire in the Ninth's coffin ship to create a group of immortal Dalek/vampire hybrids, but the Doctors are able to find the last of the Kotturuh, who had abandoned her peoples' vendetta, and convince her to kill the Dalek hybrids. The Eighth Doctor takes the Dalek squad back into the Time Vortex, and the Ninth and Tenth are able to find a new planet for the vampires to settle on with the aid of a blood substitute.

The Eighth Doctor is able to destroy the Dalek saucer and escape, but a single Dalek survives and is picked up by a colony ship, but is eventually destroyed by the Fourth Doctor. The Tenth Doctor also takes the opportunity to tie up a loose end left by the Eighth Doctor, in the form of a telepathic entity that the Eighth defeated but was unable to properly trap at the time.

== Multimedia ==
=== Animated series ===
==== Daleks! ====
Daleks! is an animated series based on the eponymous fictional extra-terrestrial race of mutants from the British science fiction television series Doctor Who. The series was written by James Goss as the final installment in the multi-platform story arc Time Lord Victorious. The series was released in 5 weekly 10-minute episodes from 12 November 2020 on the official Doctor Who YouTube channel. The CGI animation was created by Studio Liddell. The cast includes Nicholas Briggs as the Daleks, Joe Sugg as R-41, Anjli Mohindra as the Mechanoid Queen, and Ayesha Antoine as Mechonoid 2150 and the Chief Archivist.

Following the previous events of Time Lord Victorious, the Daleks ransack the Archive of Islos, only to find that their home planet Skaro has been invaded. Huw Fullerton wrote in Radio Times that the series was "an enjoyable little corner of the Doctor Who universe", although he criticized the visual effects as "a little lacklustre". Aidan Mason of Pop Culture Beast stated that, "this series is a decent watch, especially Planet of the Mechanoids", but stated that the finale was, "full of holes and tropes, as well as slightly rushed."

Daleks! episodes
| No. | Title | Written by | Original release date |
|---|---|---|---|
| 1 | "The Archive of Islos" | James Goss | 12 November 2020 |
| 2 | "The Sentinel of the Fifth Galaxy" | James Goss | 18 November 2020 |
| 3 | "Planet of the Mechanoids" | James Goss | 26 November 2020 |
| 4 | "The Deadly Ally" | James Goss | 3 December 2020 |
| 5 | "Day of Reckoning" | James Goss | 10 December 2020 |

=== Live experiences ===
==== Doctor Who: Time Fracture ====
Doctor Who: Time Fracture is an immersive experience offered by UK company Immersive Everywhere in collaboration with the BBC.

The experience is to be set across multiple times and worlds within the area that the experience is hosted, Mayfair. The experience will see attendees follow a story across multiple time periods, interact with characters from the Doctor Who universe, and encounter recurring adversaries including the Daleks and the Cybermen.

The immersive experience Time Fracture was due to launch 17 February 2021, but was postponed due to the COVID-19 pandemic. The experience launched on 21 April 2021.

==== A Dalek Awakens ====
A Dalek Awakens is an escape room game provided by UK based Escape Hunt Group Ltd in collaboration with the BBC. The escape room launched in March 2020 and was later revealed to be part of Time Lord Victorious. It is available at venues in Birmingham and Reading, and is due to be made available in Norwich and Basingstoke. Players board a mock spaceship and have to solve puzzles in order to prevent an invading Dalek from destroying them and the passengers aboard.

=== Audio dramas ===
All audio productions were produced by Big Finish Productions, except The Minds of Magnox, which was produced by BBC Audio. Reviewing Lesser Evils and Master Thief, Bryn Mitchell of We Are Cult stated that, "Like many of Big Finish’s Short Trips, these stories combine a cheap price with quality production, an elegant reading, and just plain good storytelling."

==== Big Finish Productions ====
| No. | Title | Directed by | Written by | Featuring | Released |
|---|---|---|---|---|---|
| – | "Short Trips: Master Thief" | Lisa Bowerman | Fio Trethewey | The Master | October 2020 |
| – | "Short Trips: Lesser Evils" | Lisa Bowerman | Simon Guerrier | The Master | October 2020 |
| 1 | "He Kills Me, He Kills Me Not" | Scott Handcock | Carrie Thompson | Eighth Doctor, Ood | October 2020 |
| 2 | "The Enemy of My Enemy" | Scott Handcock | Tracy Ann Baines | Eighth Doctor, Daleks | November 2020 |
| 3 | "Mutually Assured Destruction" | Scott Handcock | Lizzie Hopley | Eighth Doctor, Daleks | December 2020 |
| 4 | "Genetics of the Daleks" | Jamie Anderson | Jonathan Barnes | Fourth Doctor, Daleks | December 2020 |
| 5 | "Echoes of Extinction" | Scott Handcock | Alfie Shaw | Eighth Doctor, Tenth Doctor | April 2021 |

==== BBC Audio ====
- The Minds of Magnox

=== Books ===
- All Flesh Is Grass – BBC Books
- The Knight, the Fool and The Dead – BBC Books
- The Wintertime Paradox – Penguin Books

=== Short stories ===
- The Dawn of Kotturuh – Released on the BBC Doctor Who mailing list
- The Last Message – Included with Doctor Who Figurine Collection: Time Lord Victorious #1 – Hero Collector
- Mission to the Known – Included with Doctor Who Figurine Collection: Time Lord Victorious #2 – Hero Collector
- Exit Strategy – Included with Doctor Who Figurine Collection: Time Lord Victorious #3 – Hero Collector
- The Guide to the Dark Times – Released in the Doctor Who Annual 2021 – Penguin Books

=== Comics ===
- Defender of the Daleks – Titan Comics
- Monstrous Beauty – Doctor Who Magazine
- Tales of the Dark Times – via Doctor Who: Comic Creator app

=== Blu-ray collection ===
Time Lord Victorious: Road to the Dark Times is a compendium of previously released television stories which link to the larger Time Lord Victorious narrative. The stories included are:

- Planet of the Daleks (1973)
- Genesis of the Daleks (1975)
- The Deadly Assassin (1976)
- State of Decay (1980)
- The Curse of Fenric (1989)
- "The Runaway Bride" (2006)
- "The Waters of Mars" (2009)
