= The Krillitane Storm =

2009 novel by Christopher Cooper

- Author: Christopher Cooper
- Series: Doctor Who book: New Series Adventures
- Release number: 36
- Subject: Featuring: Tenth Doctor
- Publisher: BBC Books
- Publication date: 3 September 2009
- Media type: Hardcover
- ISBN: 978-1-84607-761-6
- Preceded by: Autonomy
- Followed by: Code of the Krillitanes

The Krillitane Storm is a BBC Books original novel written by Christopher Cooper and based on the long-running British science fiction television series Doctor Who. It features the Tenth Doctor without an official companion. It was released on 3 September 2009 alongside The Taking of Chelsea 426 and Autonomy.

It is the 10th Doctor's final novel in the New Series Adventures (not including original audio books or Code of the Krillitanes).

== Synopsis ==
The Doctor arrives in Worcester in 1139. There have been disappearances in last few months and people live in terror, afraid to leave their dwellings once the dark falls. When the Doctor meets with a Krillitane, he knows they have every reason to be afraid.

== Background ==
Though there is no official companion featured in the novel, there are guest companions named Emily and captain James Darke.

== See also ==
- Whoniverse
