= List of Peter Davison performances =

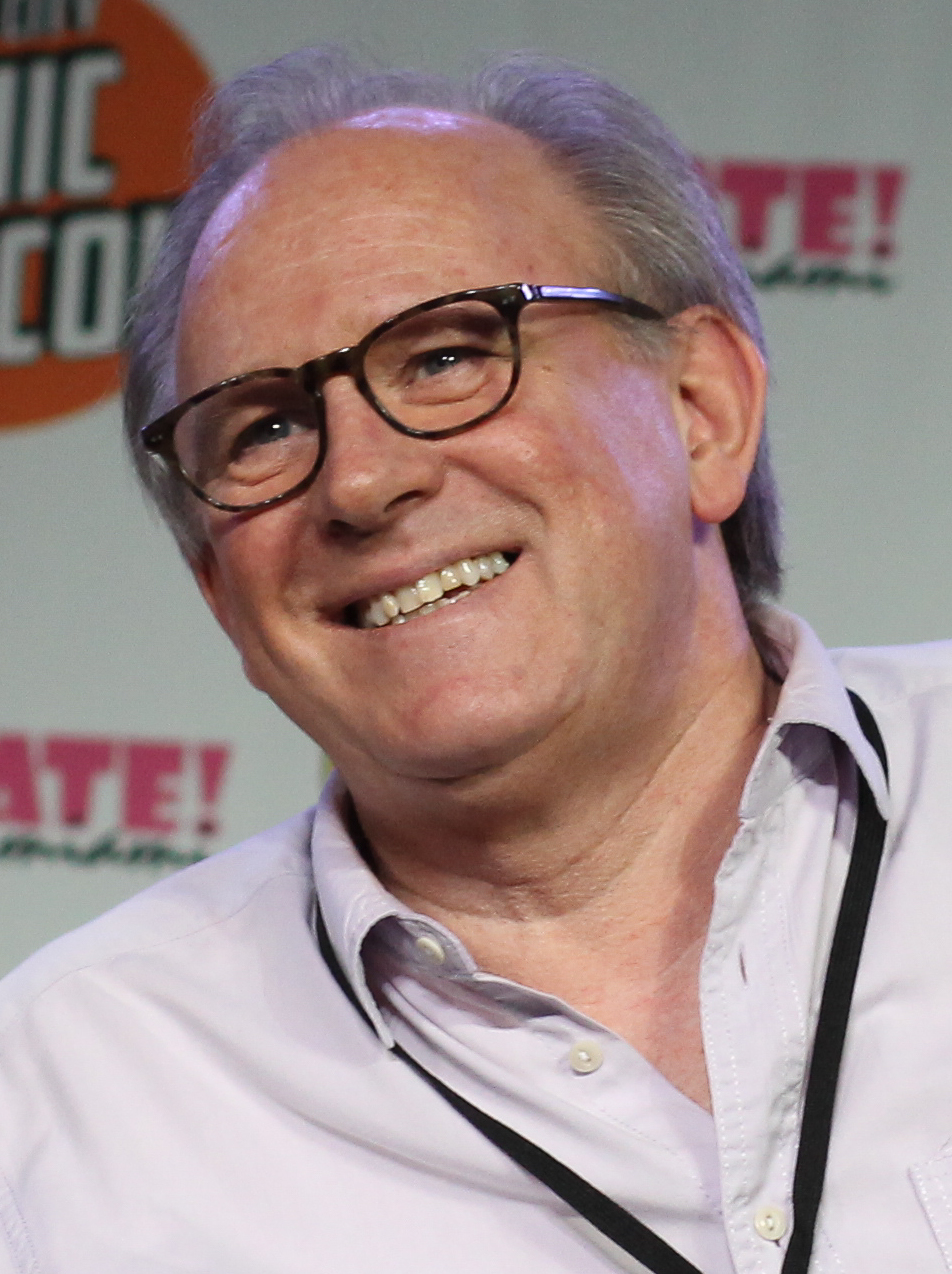
Davison at the Magic City Comic Con in 2016

Peter Malcolm Gordon Moffett, known professionally as Peter Davison, is an English actor. He made his television acting debut in 1975 and became famous as Tristan Farnon in the 1978 BBC television adaptation of James Herriot's All Creatures Great and Small stories. He starred as the fifth incarnation of the Doctor in Doctor Who (1981–1984), at the time the youngest actor to play the role.

He has worked in the mediums of film, television, stage and audio dramas. Below are a list of his credits.

== Film ==
Year	Title	Role	Notes	Ref.
1993	Harnessing Peacocks	Jim Huxtable		
1993	The Airzone Solution	Al Dunbar		
1994	Black Beauty	Squire Gordon		
1994	The Zero Imperative	Patient One		
1994	A Man You Don't Meet Every Day	Robert		
1995	The Devil of Winterborne	Gavin Purcell		
1996	Ghosts of Winterborne	Gavin Purcell		
1998	The Stalker's Apprentice	Maurice Burt		
1998	Parting Shots	John		
2014	Nerd Love	Himself		
2016	End of Term	Leigh		
2017	You, Me and Him	Teacher	Cameo	
2018	Patrick	Alan		
2018	Say My Name	Rich Herbig		
2020	Dream Horse	Lord Avery		
2026	Frank and Percy †		Post-production	

== Television ==
Year	Title	Role	Notes	Ref.
1975	The Tomorrow People	Elmer	Serial: "A Man for Emily"	
1977	Love for Lydia	Tom Holland	10 episodes	
1978–1990	All Creatures Great and Small	Tristan Farnon	65 episodes	
1980–1982	Sink or Swim	Brian Webber	All 19 episodes	
1980–1982	Holding the Fort	Russell Milburn	All 20 episodes	
1981	The Hitchhiker's Guide to the Galaxy	Dish of the Day	Episode: #1.5	
1981–1984, 2007, 2022	Doctor Who	Fifth Doctor	76 episodes (including a minisode)	
1983	Doctor Who	Omega	Serial: Arc of Infinity	
1985	Fox Tales	Various	Voice only	
1985	Anna of the Five Towns	Henry Mynors	All 4 episodes	
1985	Agatha Christie's Miss Marple	Lance Fortescue	Episode: "A Pocket Full of Rye"	
1985	Magnum, P.I.	Ian Mackerras	Episode: "Déjà vu"	
1986–1988	A Very Peculiar Practice	Dr Stephen Daker	15 episodes	
1988	Tales of the Unexpected	Jeremy Tyler	Episode: "Wink Three Times"	
1989–1990	Campion	Albert Campion	16 episodes	
1991	Fiddlers Three	Ralph West	All 14 episodes	
1992	Screen One	Dr Stephen Daker	Episode: "A Very Polish Practice"	
1992	Kinsey	Bob Stacey	2 episodes	
1993	Dimensions in Time	Fifth Doctor	Children in Need special	
1994	Heartbeat	Doctor	Episode: "A Bird in the Hand"	
1994–1995	Ain't Misbehavin'	Clive Quigley	All 12 episodes	
1995	Mole's Christmas	Various	Voice only	
1996	Cuts	Henry Babbacombe	TV film	
1997	Dear Nobody	Mr Garton	TV film	
1997	Scene		Episode: "A Man of Letters"	
1998	Wuthering Heights	Joseph Lockwood	TV film	
1998	Jonathan Creek	Stephen Claithorne	Episode: "Danse Macabre"	
1998	Verdict	Michael Naylor	Episode: "Be My Valentine"	
1999	Molly	Mr Greenfield	Unknown episodes	
1999	Hope and Glory	Neil Bruce	Episode 1	
1999	The Nearly Complete and Utter; History of Everything	Ferdinand Magellan	TV film	
2000	The Mrs Bradley Mysteries	Inspector Henry Christmas	3 episodes	
2000–2003	At Home with the Braithwaites	David Braithwaite	26 episodes	
2003	Too Good to Be True	Robert	TV film	
2003–2007	The Last Detective	DC 'Dangerous' Davies	All 17 episodes	
2005–2008	Distant Shores	Bill Shore	12 episodes	
2006	The Complete Guide to Parenting	Professor George Huntley	5 episodes	
2007	Fear, Stress and Anger	Martin Chadwick	All 6 episodes	
2007	Agatha Christie's Marple	Hubert Curtain	Episode: "At Bertram’s Hotel"	
2009	Unforgiven	John Ingrams	All 3 episodes	
2009	Al Murray's Multiple Personality Disorder	Nazi Doctor	Episode: #1.4	
2009	Micro Men	Bank Manager	TV film	
2009	Midsomer Murders	Nicky Frazer	Episode: "Secrets and Spies"	
2009	Miranda	Mr Clayton	Episode: "Teacher"	
2009	The Queen	Denis Thatcher	Episode: "The Rival"	
2010	Sherlock	Planetarium Voice	Episode: "The Great Game"	
2011	New Tricks	Charles Allenforth	Episode: "The End of the Line"	
2011–2014	Law & Order: UK	Henry Sharpe	27 episodes	
2013	Lewis	Peter Faulkner	2 episodes	
2013	Pat & Cabbage	Michael	4 episodes	
2013	The Five(ish) Doctors Reboot	Himself	Also writer and director	
2014	Death in Paradise	Arnold Finch	Episode: "The Wrong Man"	
2014–2015	Toast of London	Himself	3 episodes	
2017	Brian Pern: A Tribute	Peter Troughton	TV film	
2017	Grantchester	Geoff Towler	Episode: #3.2	
2017	Liar	Denis Walters	2 episodes	
2019	Vera	Matthew Wells	Episode "Blind Spot"	
2019	The Name of the Rose	Old Adso	7 episodes	
2019–2022	Gentleman Jack	William Priestley	7 episodes	
2020	The Trial of Christine Keeler	James Burge	2 episodes	
2020	Thunderbirds Are Go	Higgins	Voice; Episode: "Venom"	
2020	Life	Henry Reynolds	All 6 episodes	
2020	Call the Midwife	Mr. Percival	Episode: "Christmas Special"	
2021–2022	The Larkins	The Vicar	All 8 episodes	
2022	Bloods	Alistair MacBeal	Episode: #2.6	
2023–2025	The Gold	ACP Gordon Stewart	8 episodes	
2023	The Windsors	William IV	Coronation special	
2023	Good Omens	Job	Episode: "The Clue"	
2023	Tales of the TARDIS	Fifth Doctor	Episode: "Earthshock"	
2023	Murder, They Hope	David	Episode: "Blood Actually"	
2024	Beyond Paradise	Richard Baxter	3 episodes	
2025	Riot Women	Graham	Episode: #1.4	
2025	Midsomer Murders	Archie Pollock	Episode: "Lawn of the Dead"	
2026	The Marlow Murder Club	Mayor Geoffrey Truman	2 episodes	

=== Television appearances as himself ===
Year	Title	Role	Notes	Ref.
2018-2019	Great British Car Journeys	Himself	The first series was also known as Vintage Roads Great and Small in North America	
2020–present	The Yorkshire Vet	Narrator	Also features on-screen in a couple of the specials, acting in short dramatic scenes with the vets and farmer Jean Green	
2023	The Big Steam Adventure	Himself	Peter Davison, John Sergeant and steam buff Paul Middleton travel from London to Scotland using only steam power.	

== Theatre ==
Year	Title	Role	Notes	Ref.
1972	Love's Labour's Lost	Mercade	Nottingham Playhouse	
1972	Brand	villager	Nottingham Playhouse	
1972	Robin Hood	Robin Hood	Nottingham Playhouse	
1972	The Three Musketeers	John Felton/Guard	Nottingham Playhouse	
1973	The Two Gentlemen of Verona	Speed	Young Lyceum, Edinburgh	
1973	Rosencrantz and Guildenstern Are Dead	Alfred	Ledlanet House, Edinburgh	
1973	Hamlet	Osric	Ledlanet House, Edinburgh	
1973	Woyzeck		Young Lyceum, Edinburgh	
1973	The Three Estates	Soldier	Royal Lyceum Theatre, Edinburgh	
1973	The Taming of the Shrew	Tranio/Grumio	Open Space Theatre/Dutch tour	
1974	A Narrow Road to the Deep North		Royal Lyceum Theatre, Edinburgh	
1974	Midsummer Night's Dream	Lysander	Leith Festival, Edinburgh	
1980	Barefoot in the Park	Paul Bratter	Churchill Theatre, Bromley	
1982	Cinderella	Buttons	Assembly Hall Theatre Tunbridge Wells	
1984	Barefoot in the Park	Paul Bratter	UK tour	
1986	The Owl and the Pussycat	Felix	UK tour	
1991	Arsenic and Old Lace	Mortimer Brewster	Chichester Festival Theatre	
1992	The Decorator		Yvonne Arnaud Theatre	
1992–1993	The Last Yankee	Leroy Hamilton	Young Vic Theatre and Duke of York's Theatre	
1994	An Absolute Turkey	Valetin	Gielgud Theatre	
1996	Dial M for Murder	Tony Wendice	UK tour	
1997	Cinderella	Buttons	Arts Theatre, Cambridge	
1998–1999	Chicago	Amos Hart	Adelphi Theatre	
2001	Under the Doctor	Dr Jean-Pierre Moulineaux	Yvonne Arnaud Theatre and Comedy Theatre, London	
2007–2008	Spamalot	King Arthur	Palace Theatre	
2009–2012	Legally Blonde	Professor Calahan	Savoy Theatre	
2014	The Vertical Hour	Oliver Lucas	Park Theatre	
2015	Gypsy	Herbie	Savoy Theatre	
2024	Kiss Me, Kate	Harrison Howell	Barbican Theatre	
2025	Inside No. 9 Stage/Fright	Guest star (6 December)	The Alexandra, Birmingham	

== Audio drama ==
Year	Title	Role	Notes	Ref.
1985–1987	King Street Junior	Eric Brown	BBC Radio 4 Series 1 and 2	
1992	Sherlock Holmes	Inspector Forrester	BBC Radio 4 Episode; The Reigate Squires	
1995–1996	Change at Oglethorpe	David Clare	BBC Radio 2	
1999–present	Doctor Who: The Audio Adventures	Fifth Doctor	Big Finish Productions; 156 episodes	
2003–2006	Rigor Mortis	Dr. Anthony Webster	BBC Radio 4	
2006	Nebulous	Professor Diplodocus	BBC Radio 4	
2008	The Long Dark Tea-Time of the Soul	Simon Draycott	BBC Radio 4	
2012–2014	Welcome to Our Village, Please Invade Carefully	Richard Lyons	BBC Radio 2	
2018	The Diary of River Song	Fifth Doctor	Big Finish Productions; Series 3	

== Video games ==
Year	Title	Role	Notes	Ref.
1997	Destiny of the Doctors	Fifth Doctor		
2015	Lego Dimensions	Fifth Doctor	Archive recording sound	
2023	Lies of P	Pulcinella		

== Web ==
Year	Title	Role	Notes	Ref.
2020	The Doctors Say Thank You	Himself		
2025	Destination: Daleks	Fifth Doctor	Doctor Who mini-episode	
