= Dreamland (Doctor Who) =

- Doctor Who animated serial

Cast
- Doctor: David Tennant – Tenth Doctor
- Companion: Georgia Moffett – Cassie Rice
- Others: Tim Howar – Jimmy Stalkingwolf; Lisa Bowerman – Saruba Velak; David Warner – Lord Azlok; Stuart Milligan – Colonel Stark; Clarke Peters – Night Eagle; Nicholas Rowe – Rivesh Mantilax; Peter Guinness – Mister Dread; Ryan McCluskey – Soldiers

Production
- Directed by: Gary Russell
- Written by: Phil Ford
- Produced by: Ed Cross (Interactive Producer); Mat Fidell (Senior Producer)
- Executive producers: Anwen Aspden (Interactive); Sarah Muller (for CBBC); Russell T Davies; Julie Gardner; Piers Wenger
- Music by: Murray Gold
- Running time: 1 episode x 12 minutes; 5 episodes x 6 minutes; 42 minutes total
- First broadcast: 21–26 November 2009; 5 December 2009 (full story)

Chronology
← Preceded by "The Waters of Mars"	Followed by → "The End of Time"

Dreamland is the third animated Doctor Who serial (based on the British science fiction television live action series) to air on television, and the second to air after the revival of the live-action series in 2005. It stars David Tennant as the Tenth Doctor and aired in six parts (one 12-minute episode, followed by five 6-minute episodes) broadcast daily from 21 November 2009 on the BBC's Red Button service, the official Doctor Who website and the BBC iPlayer. It was broadcast in its entirety on BBC Two and BBC HD on 5 December 2009.

== Plot ==
=== Episode 1 ===
13 June 1947: a spaceship, trying to escape from two others, is shot down and crashes on Earth near Roswell, New Mexico. Eleven years later in Dry Springs, Nevada, The TARDIS materialises at a diner, and the Doctor meets Cassie Rice and Native American Jimmy Stalkingwolf. He uses his sonic screwdriver to investigate an alien artifact. Detecting that the artifact has been activated, two Men in Black arrive demanding the artifact in question. The Doctor and the others escape, to investigate Jimmy's "space monster". The monster turns out to be a Viperox battle-drone and is destroyed by a rocket from a USAF helicopter which arrives on the scene. The soldiers take them to Area 51 (aka Dreamland). In Dreamland, Colonel Stark locks them in a cell with a gas that will wipe their memories. The Doctor manages to break free, stop the gas, and escapes with Cassie and Jimmy via a ventilation shaft. The alarm sounds and they run into a lab where they find a captured grey alien. After fleeing pursuing guards in a lift they are recaptured at the top of the lift shaft. Colonel Stark is revealed to be working with a Viperox leader named Lord Azlok.

=== Episode 2 ===
The Doctor, Cassie and Jimmy find themselves in a hangar which contains a spaceship similar to the one that crashed in 1947. The Doctor escapes by piloting the ship. They are pursued by two fighter jets and crash near an abandoned mining town called Solitude. Exploring an abandoned building, Jimmy is pulled into a hole in the floor by a Viperox. The Doctor and Cassie follow and find Jimmy being questioned by Lord Azlok about the Doctor. The Doctor emerges from hiding and confronts Lord Azlok. Lord Azlok reveals that he is only seeking "an enemy of our kind". Before the Doctor can find out the identity of their target, Cassie, who has freed Jimmy, effects an escape by starting a fire with an oil lamp. The group then stumble across a large number of Viperox eggs and are confronted by the huge Viperox Queen, which is laying the eggs. Behind them, their Viperox pursuers are bearing down.

=== Episode 3 ===
The Doctor, Cassie and Jimmy escape through the mine tunnels in a mine railway cart. When the cart finally exits the mine shaft, the three are greeted by Mr. Dread and the other "Alliance of Shades" android. The four androids are then destroyed Jimmy's Grandfather Night Eagle, who turns out to be familiar with aliens. The group proceed to a cave where a grey alien by the name of Rivesh Mantilax is kept. He tells the story of how his people fought the Viperox and lost years before. After his tale, Colonel Stark enters the cave and thanks the Doctor for leading the army to the alien, proclaiming the Doctor has helped him to save the world.

=== Episode 4 ===
Stark takes them back to Area 51 – along the way Night Eagle grimly notes, "Men like Stark don't save worlds. All they know is destruction." Rivesh Mantilax is reunited with his wife Seruba Velak and the alien tech found in the diner turns out to be a genetic weapon designed by Rivesh Mantilax to destroy the Viperox. The device can only be used by Rivesh Mantilax's DNA, and he is also the only one that can change the code to attack other beings, hence why Lord Azlok wanted it. Stark intends for the device to be reprogrammed to destroy the Russians, but the Doctor refuses to allow this and snatches the weapon, fleeing to the roof with Stark in hot pursuit. The Doctor, cornered by Stark, ultimately convinces him that his alliance with Lord Azlok and the Viperox will only lead to disaster – the Viperox will at some point betray Stark and conquer Earth (as they have already conquered the technologically superior race Rivesh and Seruba belong to, the US Army would have no chance at all). Stark orders his men to arrest Lord Azlok, but he escapes, declaring that the Viperox will "tear your world to shreds".

=== Episode 5 ===
The Doctor and Stark run down to the room where Rivesh and Seruba are, but find that Seruba is cradling Rivesh. She reveals that Azlok has mortally injured him and he is dying. However, Seruba says there was something in the ship that could revive him, but Stark says that anything found in the ship was stored in the Area 51 vault, which hasn't been entered for some time as something got loose in there. The Doctor, Cassie, Jimmy, Seruba and Stark arrive at the vault, and the Doctor asks Jimmy and Cassie to find the TARDIS back at Dry Springs. Inside the vault, the Doctor and Seruba go and look for the device they need. Meanwhile, in the Viperox lair Azlok gets the Viperox Queen to release her newly hatched brood, so that they will destroy the whole town. Back in the vault, the Doctor comes across a swarm of Skorpius Flies, a carnivorous alien species that form a group mind. Seruba tells the Doctor she has found the device that could revive Rivesh, but the Skorpius Flies chase after them until the Doctor finds a crate and hides inside. He helps Seruba escape inside the crate by working out how many steps he took on the way in. At the Area 51 base Stark is informed that they are getting reports of Viperox attacks. He orders a row of tanks to block the Viperox off. The Doctor and Seruba shuffle out of the vault inside the crate so the flies won't notice. Meanwhile, Cassie and Jimmy are driving along with the TARDIS on the back of Jimmy's pickup truck when the Viperox burst out of the ground into their path.

=== Episode 6 ===
Jimmy manages to swerve and drives off while the Viperox chase after them. Helicopters fly over head and fire at flying Viperox. Stark is annoyed that they are losing, when Lord Azlok storms in and tries to get the truth of where the Doctor is. The Doctor and Seruba have escaped the vault and drive a Jeep to the base, where they see that it's under heavy attack. The Doctor is worried about getting in until Jimmy and Cassie show up with the TARDIS. The TARDIS materialises in the room in Area 51 where Rivesh is dying. In the nick of time, Seruba revives Rivesh. The Doctor asks for the device to be activated and Rivesh relishes the thought of killing the Viperox. However, the Doctor warns him not to detonate it, or it will completely wipe the Viperox out. Rivesh remains adamant on revenge, but the Doctor reinstates his beliefs and tells him that no-one should have the power to exterminate an entire species. Rivesh returns the favour of his revival and trusts the Doctor with the device. The Doctor uses his sonic screwdriver on it and then he rushes into the TARDIS and grabs a cable. At that moment, Azlok holds Jimmy hostage at the entrance to the TARDIS, threatening to kill him if the Doctor detonates it. The Doctor says he isn't going to set it off and explains that one day the Viperox will become a peace-loving race. Azlok dismisses this as madness and advances, but the Doctor connects a cable from the TARDIS console to the device and unleashes a deafening soundwave that affects all the Viperox in the area: the Doctor then orders the Viperox to leave Earth and never return. A furious Azlok vows that the Doctor's time will come, though the Doctor dismisses the warning of his impending death, before Azlok and the rest of the Viperox retreat and flee from Earth. After the attack, Stark thanks the Doctor and Seruba and Rivesh leave in their ship. The Doctor leaves the weapon with Stark in case the Viperox ever return, and Stark warns them to keep quiet about the events. The Doctor suggests that Cassie and Jimmy clear up the Viperox mess. As the TARDIS departs, Cassie and Jimmy hold hands.

== Production ==
=== Cast notes ===
Georgia Moffett (Cassie Rice) guest-starred as Jenny in the 2008 Doctor Who episode "The Doctor's Daughter", and is the real-world daughter of Peter Davison who portrayed the Fifth Doctor from 1981 to 1984 and is married to David Tennant who played the tenth Doctor. She portrayed Tanya Webster in the audio drama Red Dawn with Davison reprising his role as the Fifth Doctor, and she narrated the Tenth Doctor audio-book Snowglobe 7.

Lisa Bowerman (Saruba Velak) played the Cheetah Person Karra in the 1989 Doctor Who serial Survival (the last serial of the classic series to be broadcast). Since 1998, she has also played Bernice Summerfield in the ongoing Big Finish audio drama series and in occasional Doctor Who audio stories.

Veteran actor David Warner has also appeared in numerous Big Finish audio dramas, including portraying an alternate version of the Third Doctor in two Doctor Who Unbound stories, Sympathy for the Devil (which also featured David Tennant) and Masters of War, plus several audios featuring Bernice Summerfield (played by Lisa Bowerman).

Stuart Milligan appeared as Richard Nixon in "The Impossible Astronaut" and "Day of the Moon", where he was again at Area 51 in the latter episode.

== Reception ==
Professional ratings
Review scores
Source	Rating
Den of Geek	4/5 stars
IGN	4/10
SFX	4/5 stars

SFX magazine praised the show for its story but was slightly disappointed with the stiff animation: "In a year of Doctor Who specials this little gem deserves to be embraced as every bit as special as its live action counterparts. And that's saying something, considering the CG animation is, to put it politely, basic. But Dreamland is a perfect example of that old adage that a decent story is more important than flashy visuals."

== Home media ==
On 1 February 2010, BBC DVD and 2entertain released the story as a Region 2 two-disc set with all three uncut episodes of Doctor Who: Greatest Moments (a series of Doctor Who Confidential specials) on another disc. Despite the Greatest Moments segments being longer than Dreamland, Dreamland was the title of the set, whilst the Greatest Moments segments are given the status of 'special feature'. It was released in the US and Canada on 5 October 2010.

In 2019, Dreamland was released in Germany on DVD under the title Doctor Who – Dreamland: Invasion der Area 51 and both 10th Doctor's animated adventures were released on Blu-ray Doctor Who – Animated Double Feature Collection: Dreamland / Auf der Suche nach der Unendlichkeit. Even though The Infinite Quest is included in standard definition, Dreamland was published in high-definition for the first time. The Blu-ray disc is region ABC and includes the English language track and subtitles in addition to a German dubbed version, which was made for this release.

In September 2019, The Infinite Quest and Dreamland were also both included on the Doctor Who: The Complete David Tennant Collection Blu-ray release in North America. On the 21st of October 2019 in the U.K. both Dreamland and The Infinite Quest were released on to Blu-ray in the "Complete David Tennant Specials" 4 Disc Steelbook which also includes, The Next Doctor, Planet of the Dead, The Waters of Mars, The End of Time Part 1 and The End of Time Part 2, with Doctor Who Confidential on its own disc.
