= Richard Corgan =

Welsh actor

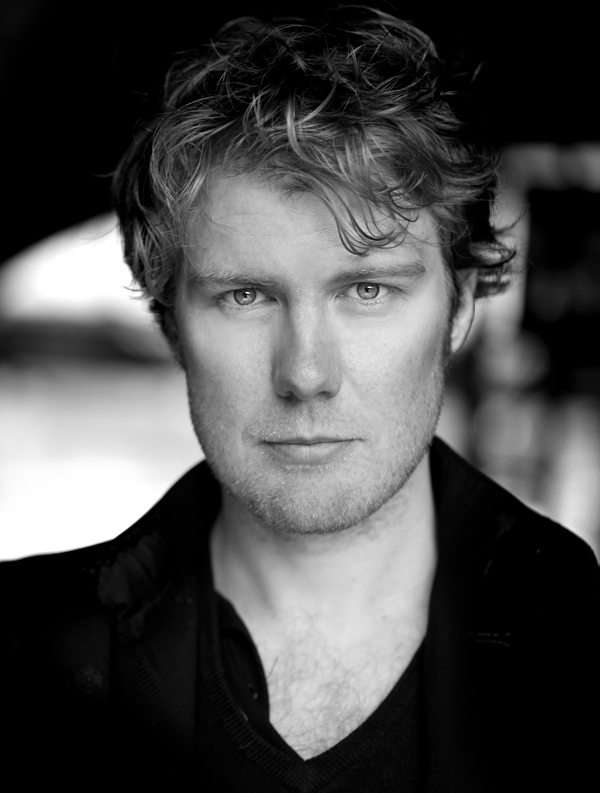
Richard Corgan

Richard Corgan is a Welsh actor.

== Early life and career ==
Richard Corgan was born in January 1978 in Cwmtwrch, Wales, where he was also brought up. He went to Maesydderwen school and later to Gorseinon College, Aberystwyth University and The Bristol Old Vic Theatre School.

Corgan's television roles include the recurring character Dafydd "Dav" Llewellyn in BBC One's Doctors and a leading role in two series of the BBC Wales drama Baker Boys. He has also appeared in the BBC programmes Casualty, Caught in the Web, and The B Word. From 2018 to 2020, he appeared in the BBC Three series In My Skin as Tony Chipper.

Corgan's films include the low budget horror film Colin, and the short films Nowhere Fast and The Sunday. He also appeared in the Naomi Watts film Diana (2013) and the science fiction film Dune Drifter.
