= Daisy Aitkens =

English actress and TV writer

- Born: 25 March 1986 (age 40); Sydney, Australia
- Occupation: Actress / Screenwriter / Director
- Years active: 2001-present
- Known for: Fear, Stress & Anger; Watson and Oliver
- Family: Michael Aitkens (father)

Daisy Aitkens (born 25 March 1986) is an English actress, screenwriter and director best known for her role as Lucy Chadwick in the television series Fear, Stress & Anger, and sketch characters in Watson and Oliver. She wrote and directed the 2017 film You, Me and Him.

== Early life ==
Aitkens was born in Sydney, Australia to British writer and actor Michael Aitkens, and grew up in London. She studied drama at the London Academy of Music and Dramatic Art (LAMDA), and while acting became her focus, she was really excited by the idea of becoming a writer.

== Career ==
=== Acting ===
After graduating, and throughout her 20s, Aitkens acted in about 15 television commercials, as well as television guest roles such as Casualty, Wire in the Blood, The Bill and EastEnders, while trying to establish herself as a writer.

In 2007, Aitkens starred on short-lived sitcom Fear, Stress & Anger for six episodes, alongside Doctor Who alumni (and real life father and daughter) Peter Davison and Georgia Tennant. Her father Michael Aitkens was the creator of the series and it was loosely based on his life with his own family. Aitkens played Lucy Chadwick, the role based on her own real-life sister, while Tennant played Chloe Chadwick, the role based on Aitkens.

From 2012 to 2013, Aitkens appeared as various characters on the sketch show Watson & Oliver. She has also appeared in several feature films, including Colin (2008), Nightshooters (2018), School of the Damned (2019) and Dune Drifter (2020) as well as film shorts.

As an actor, she has also toured with Alan Ayckbourn's theatre company, on a 2011 production of Communicating Doors.

=== Writing / directing ===
A script (written in partnership with an actor alumnus from LAMDA) secured Aitkens her first job in a writer's room. After writing on the sitcoms My Family and Shelfstackers, she wrote and directed the short film, 96 Ways to Say I Love You (2014) and The Exit (2016), before directing and writing her debut feature film, You, Me and Him (starring Lucy Punch, Faye Marsay and David Tennant) in 2017.

Aitkens has also written for numerous publications and websites including The Times, Stylebible, Save the Cat, and Huffington Post.

== Personal life ==
Together with her husband, producer Neil Andrews, Aitkens has two daughters. Prior to having her children, she was diagnosed with polyendocrine metabolic ovarian syndrome (PMOS) at the age of 21, and later found out she had an irregular shaped uterus, resulting in three miscarriages.

== Filmography ==
=== As actor ===
==== Television ====
Year	Title	Role	Type
2001	Life As We Know It	Anne	TV series, 1 episode
2006	Casualty	Laura	TV series, 1 episode
2007	Fear, Stress and Anger	Lucy Chadwick	TV series, 6 episodes
2007	Wire in the Blood	Sara Lloyd	TV series, 1 episode
2005–2007	The Bill	Lisa Holland / Joss Green	TV series, 2 episodes
2008–2012	Doctors	Jenny Whitaker / Jocasta Pennington / Laura Gerald	TV series, 3 episodes
2013	East Enders	Sophie	TV series, 1 episode
2013–2013	Watson and Oliver	Various characters	TV series, 10 episodes
2013	The Crazy Ones	Maid	TV series, 1 episode

==== Film ====
Year	Title	Role	Type
2005	The Cross of Joshua Home		Short film
2008	Colin	Linda (Colin's sister)	Feature film
2011	Showreel	Girl on Street	Feature film
2013	Manorexic	Jennifer	Short film
2013	Magpie	Emily	Feature film
2014	Meeting Mr. Reich	Kate	Short film
2018	Nightshooters	Gabi	Feature film
2019	School of the Damned	Murphy	Feature film
2020	Dune Drifter	Yaren	Feature film

==== Theatre ====
Year	Title	Role	Type
2011	Communicating Doors	Jessica	Stephen Joseph Theatre, North Yorkshire, Yvonne Arnaud Theatre, Guildford, Cambridge Arts Theatre, Theatre Royal, Bath, Theatre Royal, Brighton, Gate Theatre, Durham, Oxford Playhouse, Richmond Theatre, London
2005	The Woman in Black		Frinton Theatre
2005	Relatively Speaking		Frinton Theatre
2005	In Two Minds		Frinton Theatre
2005	Life Time Three		Frinton Theatre
2005	The Man of Destiny		Frinton Theatre
2005	The Real Inspector Hound		Frinton Theatre
2005	The Sneeze		Frinton Theatre
	Lettice and Lovage		Frinton Theatre
	Ghosts		Frinton Theatre
	Family Circles		Frinton Theatre
	The Importance of Being Earnest		Frinton Theatre
	Dead of Night		Frinton Theatre
	Private Lives		Frinton Theatre
	Pains of Youth		Gate Theatre, Durham

=== As writer / director ===
==== Television ====
Year	Title	Role	Type
2010	Shelfstackers	Writer	TV series, 2 episodes
2009–2010	My Family	Writer / Script Associate	TV series, 5 episodes
2018	Peel and Jones	Writer	TV pilot

==== Film ====
Year	Title	Role	Type
2015	96 Ways to Say I Love You	Writer / Director	Short film
2016	The Exit	Writer / Director	Short film
2017	You, Me and Him	Writer / Director	Feature film
2018	A Quiet Life	Writer	Feature film
TBA	Memoirs of a Stalker	Writer	In development
