= Louis Davison =

British actor

- Born: Louis Claude Moffett; 31 July 1999 (age 27); Hammersmith, London, England
- Education: Goldsmiths, University of London
- Occupation: Actor
- Years active: 2013–present
- Parent(s): Peter Davison (father); Elizabeth Morton (mother)
- Relatives: Georgia Tennant (half-sister); David Tennant (brother-in-law); Joel Davison (brother)

Louis Davison (born Louis Claude Moffett; 31 July 1999) is a British actor. He is best known for his television roles as Geoffrey Charles Poldark in the BBC historical drama Poldark and Prince Edmund in the Netflix historical drama Vikings: Valhalla.

== Early life ==
Davison was born in Hammersmith, London, the eldest son of actor Peter Davison and actress Elizabeth Morton. He is the older brother of actor Joel Davison and a paternal half-brother of actress Georgia Tennant.

He trained with the Orange Tree Youth Theatre in Richmond and later with the National Youth Theatre in 2017, alongside completing a Shakespeare Diploma at the Royal Academy of Dramatic Art. In 2023, he graduated with a First Class honours degree from Goldsmiths, University of London.

== Career ==
Davison made his first screen appearance in the 2013 BBC comedy spoof The Five(ish) Doctors Reboot, written and directed by his father. In July 2014, at age 14, he made his professional West End stage debut portraying Prince Edward in Jamie Lloyd's production of Shakespeare's Richard III at Trafalgar Studios, performing alongside Martin Freeman. In 2025, he starred as the lead role Sasha in Philip Ridley's one man show The Poltergeist at the Arcola Theatre.

In 2016, Davison made his feature film debut portraying Victor Bruntley in the Tim Burton dark fantasy film Miss Peregrine's Home for Peculiar Children. From 2016 to 2017, he played the recurring character Parker Whitfield across nine episodes of the BBC One medical drama series Holby City.

In 2018, Davison joined the cast of the BBC historical drama series Poldark for its fourth series, portraying Geoffrey Charles Poldark. The following year, he appeared as Dr. Wallace in an episode of the Sky comedy series The Reluctant Landlord, directed by David Sant. From 2019 to 2020, he played Simon in the teen comedy-drama series Find Me in Paris on Hulu.

In 2022, Davison featured in the main cast of the first season of the Netflix series Vikings: Valhalla, portraying Prince Edmund (later King Edmund II). In 2025, he played the leading historical role of Private Harry Farr in the World War I independent drama film The Fallow Few, directed by Josh Rappaport. In 2026, he guest-starred as Jamie Vance in the opening episode of the fifteenth series of the BBC crime drama Death in Paradise. He also works as a voice actor including for Doctor Who Big Finish productions, and voice work on TV series Maigret.
