= Ty Tennant =

English actor (born 2002)

- Born: Ty Peter Martin-Moffett; 27 March 2002 (age 24); White City, London, England
- Occupation: Actor
- Years active: 2013–present
- Parents: Georgia Tennant (mother); David Tennant (adoptive father)
- Relatives: Peter Davison (maternal grandfather); Sandra Dickinson (maternal grandmother); Sandy McDonald (adoptive paternal grandfather); Harold Searles (maternal great-grandfather)

Ty Peter Tennant (né Martin-Moffett; born 27 March 2002) is an English actor and musician. He is known for his roles as Tom Gresham in the science fiction series War of the Worlds (2019–2022) and young Aegon II Targaryen in the HBO fantasy series House of the Dragon (2022).

== Early life ==
Tennant was born Ty Peter Martin-Moffett at Queen Charlotte's and Chelsea Hospital in the White City area of West London to actress Georgia Moffett and grew up in Chiswick. In 2011, when his mother married actor David Tennant, whom she had met in 2008, Tennant adopted Ty, who gained Tennant's surname. His maternal grandparents are actors Peter Davison and Sandra Dickinson. He is of Guyanese descent through Davison's father, and Finnish descent through Dickinson's mother. Tennant attended Arts Educational School (ArtsEd) for sixth form.

== Career ==
Tennant had a brief cameo in the 2013 comedy spoof The Five(ish) Doctors Reboot. He later made his feature film debut in 2019 as a younger version of Tom Glynn-Carney's Christopher Wiseman in Tolkien. That same year, he began starring in the science fiction series War of the Worlds as Tom Gresham, the younger brother of Daisy Edgar-Jones' character Emily. He also made a guest appearance in an episode of the BBC One soap opera Casualty.

In 2021, Tennant and Sebastian Croft were cast as the Dead Boy Detectives Edwin Paine and Charles Rowland respectively in season 3 of the DC Universe series Doom Patrol. He had a cameo in Around the World in 80 Days. Tennant once again played a young Tom Glynn-Carney, this time as Aegon II Targaryen in the 2022 HBO fantasy series House of the Dragon, a Game of Thrones prequel and adaptation of George R. R. Martin's companion book Fire and Blood. In 2023, Tennant played the role of Raffy in Channel 4's standalone drama Consent. In March 2023, it was announced Tennant would appear in season 2 of Good Omens on Amazon Prime, alongside his father, David Tennant, and grandfather, Peter Davison.

In addition to acting, Tennant is a musician.

== Filmography ==
Film
Year	Title	Role(s)	Notes
2019	Tolkien	Christopher Wiseman	
2025	Every Time I See a Yellow Car	Olly	Short film

Television
Year	Title	Role	Notes
2013	The Five(ish) Doctors Reboot	Himself	TV film
2019	Casualty	Aaron McKiernan	S33, E34
2019–2022	War of the Worlds	Tom Gresham	Main role; 19 episodes
2021	Doom Patrol	Edwin Paine	Episode: "Dead Patrol"
2021	Around the World in 80 Days	Gang Leader	1 episode
2022	House of the Dragon	Young Aegon II Targaryen	2 episodes: "The Princess and the Queen" and "Driftmark"
2022	Staged	Himself	Episode: "Past"
2023	Consent	Raffy	TV film
2023	Good Omens	Ennon	Episode: "The Clue"
2026	The Librarians: The Next Chapter	Peter Pan	Episode: "And the Vanishing Bankers"
