= Halifax Choral Society =

- Choir
- Origin: Halifax, West Yorkshire, England
- Founded: 9 February 1818; 208 years ago
- Founder: William Priestley
- Genre: Classical music
- Members: 99
- Music director: Anthony Gray
- Chief conductor: Anthony Gray
- Headquarters: Halifax
- Influences: Oratorio
- Website: www.halifaxchoral.org

Halifax Choral Society (HCS) is a choir based in the town of Halifax in the English county of West Yorkshire. It is notable for being the oldest amateur choral society in Britain (and possibly in the world) with an unbroken record of performance.

== History ==
The idea for the Halifax Choral Society (initially called Halifax Quarterly Choral Society) emerged from a discussion in late 1817 at a dinner party hosted at his home, Crow Trees in Lightcliffe, Halifax, for his musical friends by William Priestley, an eminent local musician, antiquary and literary gentleman. Late in 1817, at a dinner party Priestley discussed the possibility of a permanent choir rather than the gatherings of singers that had presented concerts in the district for many years previously.

The choir has played an important role in the social and musical life of Halifax throughout its life, especially during the many civic and national celebrations which typified Imperial Britain in the nineteenth century. In the twentieth century the choir was able to keep going through the two world wars, and exploited the technology of radio, TV, and the gramophone and its descendants, to reach new audiences.

As well as performing with professional orchestras and top-ranking soloists, it performs with the highest ranking brass bands such as the Black Dyke Band from nearby Queensbury. The choir maintains a friendly rivalry with neighbouring Huddersfield Choral Society. This may be due in part to the Halifax Choral Society interviewing and turning down the young Malcolm Sargent for the post of conductor, and then later seeing Sargent's success as conductor in Huddersfield.

In 1901, at the instigation of the Society, the Victoria Hall was opened at the south end of Halifax town centre and a large pipe organ by William Hill & Sons was installed at the expense of Elizabeth Porter in memory of her brother Samuel; the hall became the main home of Halifax Choral Society and, although remodelled in 1964 to add theatre facilities to its concert hall design, it has remained a venue for performance.

Halifax Choral Society has pioneered music by such composers as Mendelssohn and Haydn. Works have also been commissioned especially for the HCS.

The choral society was featured in the BBC tv show Gareth Malone's Messiah, recognising the society's tradition of singing Handel's Messiah which had involved 206 consecutive annual performances as of 2025

== Mozart manuscript ==
The Choir made headlines when it presented, for the first time in modern history, a fascinating orchestration of Handel's oratorio Judas Maccabaeus. The score, which is attributed to Mozart, was found in the HCS archives where it had been preserved since the early 1850s, having been presented to HCS by the Choir's founder. The find inspired a TV recording of the first performance, broadcast in the UK and on Trio Arts (part of the Trio TV network) in the USA.

== Bicentenary ==
The Society held its bicentenary season in 2017–18 with a programme which included a new oratorio commission from Philip Wilby. The work is called The Holy Face, and features the story of the life and dramatic death of Halifax's patron saint – John the Baptist, whose head is pictured on the Halifax coat of arms. The final concert of the season was a reprise of the first of the first: on 9 February 1818, in the Halifax Court House, this was Haydn's The Creation.
