= Sandra Dickinson =

British American actress (born 1948)

- Born: Sandra Searles; October 20, 1948 (age 78); Washington, D.C., U.S.
- Other name: Sandra Searles Dickinson
- Citizenship: United States; United Kingdom
- Education: Royal Central School of Speech and Drama
- Occupation: Actress
- Years active: 1973–present
- Spouses: Hugh Dickinson (m. 1969; div. 1974); Peter Davison (m. 1978; div. 1994); Mark Osmond (m. 2009)
- Children: Georgia Tennant
- Father: Harold Searles
- Relatives: Ty Tennant (grandson); David Tennant (son-in-law)

Sandra Dickinson (née Searles; born October 20, 1948) is an American-British actress. She trained at the Central School of Speech and Drama in London. She has often played characters within the trope of a dumb blonde with a high-pitched voice.

== Early life ==
Dickinson was born in Washington, D.C. and grew up in Maryland with her younger brother. Her father, Harold F. Searles, was a psychoanalyst. Her mother, Sylvia Manninen, of Finnish descent, was a nurse.

== Career ==
She made her acting debut as a waitress in the 1973 British film The Final Programme. She later played the role of Trillian in the TV series of Douglas Adams's The Hitchhiker's Guide to the Galaxy.

She has appeared in films including Superman III, Supergirl, StagKnight, Ready Player One and The Batman.

She has provided the American voice of Jemima Puddle-Duck in the British animated children's television series The World of Peter Rabbit and Friends, the Voice Trumpets in the US dub of Teletubbies, Bitchin' Betty in the 1996 film Space Truckers, and Chico in Counterfeit Cat.

She was also an occasional guest panellist on the BBC quiz show Blankety Blank in the early 1980s.

She has made guest appearances on shows, such as Philip Marlowe, Private Eye, Casualty, New Tricks, Holby City, Uncle, Doctors and White Van Man.

=== Other acting and voice roles ===
Dickinson and then husband Peter Davison appeared together in Doctor Who producer John Nathan-Turner's production of the holiday pantomime Cinderella in 1983. They also appeared in a stage production of The Owl and the Pussycat, and Barefoot in the Park, a London stage production from 1984, as a pair of American newlyweds adjusting to life in their new high-rise apartment.

In 1997, she played Eunice Hubbel in Peter Hall's production of A Streetcar Named Desire at Theatre Royal, Haymarket.

She played Queen Camilla in a Carlisle pantomime production of Snow White & the Seven Dwarves in 2007, and the following year played the Fairy Godmother at the Towngate Theatre, Basildon's production of Cinderella, reprising the role in the 2009 Harlow Playhouse theatre production of Cinderella alongside her current husband, Mark Osmond. From December 18, 2010, to January 9, 2011, Dickinson played the evil Queen Maleficent in the pantomime Snow White and the Seven Dwarfs at the Corn Exchange in Exeter. From December 13, 2014, to January 4, 2015, Dickinson played Queen Whoppa in the pantomime Jack and the Beanstalk at Exeter Corn Exchange.

She played Debbie in White Van Man series 1, episode 5 "Honest", first broadcast on April 12, 2011. The series stars her daughter Georgia Tennant. In The Amazing World of Gumball Dickinson provides many voices including those of Granny Jojo, Mrs. Jotunheim, Karen, Felicity Parham, and the cupcake woman. She is the voice of Grandma Tracey in the 2015 Thunderbirds revival.

In 2014, Dickinson understudied Angela Lansbury in the West End production of Blithe Spirit – co-starring Simon Jones, with whom she had worked on The Hitchhiker's Guide to the Galaxy – but she never got to perform Madame Arcati, other than in the public understudy run, as Lansbury did not miss a single performance.

== Personal life ==
Dickinson married actor Peter Davison on December 26, 1978, and they were divorced in 1994. Together they composed and performed the theme tune to the 1980s children's programme Button Moon. They have a daughter, Georgia Tennant, who is also an actress.

Dickinson married her third husband, another British actor and singer, Mark Osmond, on August 16, 2009. The wedding was filmed for Four Weddings, a reality TV show where four couples compete to have theirs voted the best wedding; hers came third. Osmond is the lead singer of the band Bigger Than Mary, who played at the wedding. Her grandson, Ty Tennant, gave her away. The wedding took place in Shepperton, where the couple lived at the time.

Dickinson became a British citizen the same year. With her husband, she runs the Shepperton-based stage school Close Up Theatre School.

== Filmography ==
=== Film ===
| Year | Title | Role | Notes |
|---|---|---|---|
| 1973 | The Final Programme | Waitress | |
| 1983 | Superman III | Wife | |
| 1983 | The Lonely Lady | Nancy Day | |
| 1984 | Supergirl | Pretty Young Lady | |
| 1986 | Dead Man's Folly | Marilyn Gale | |
| 1995 | Balto | Dixie / Sylvie / Rosy's mother | Voice |
| 1996 | Space Truckers | Btchin' Betty | Voice |
| 2007 | StagKnight | Fay | |
| 2009 | Malice in Wonderland | Mother | |
| 2009 | Tormented | Miss Swanson | |
| 2017 | You, Me and Him | Jury | |
| 2018 | Ready Player One | Old Boxing Woman | |
| 2018 | Intrigo: Death of an Author | Madame H. | |
| 2022 | The Batman | Dory | |
| 2025 | The Running Man | Victoria Parrakis | |

=== Television ===
| Year | Title | Role | Notes |
|---|---|---|---|
| Early 1970s | Birds Eye | | Beefburger TV advertisements, directed by Alan Parker, in the early 1970s. |
| 1975 | The Tomorrow People | Emily | Episode A Man for Emily. Her future husband Peter Davison played her on-screen brother. |
| 1981 | The Hitchhikers Guide to the Galaxy | Trillian | Iconic TV Series inspired by the Radio Series, first book, double LP and stage plays |
| 1983 | Prestige saucepans | | Prestige TV advert, with her then husband Peter Davison. |
| 1984 | The Adventure Game | | Appeared in Season 3, Episode 3 with Adam Tandy & Chris Serle. |
| 1992 | 2 Point 4 Children | Tina | Replaced Patricia Brake from series 2 onward. |
| 2009 | New Tricks | Lady Gloria Gransford | |
| 2011–2019 | The Amazing World of Gumball | Granny Jojo / Mrs. Jötunheim / Additional voices | 81 episodes |
| 2014 | Uncle | Suzy | TV series starring Nick Helm |
| 2015–2020 | Thunderbirds Are Go | Grandma Tracy | 28 episodes |
| 2025 | The Wonderfully Weird World of Gumball | Granny Jojo / Mrs. Jötunheim / Additional voices | 5 episodes |
