= Harold Searles =

American psychoanalyst

- Born: Harold Frederic Searles; September 1, 1918; Hancock, New York, U.S.
- Died: November 18, 2015 (aged 97); Los Angeles, California, U.S.
- Education: Cornell University; Harvard Medical School
- Known for: Psychoanalytic works
- Spouse: Sulvii "Sylvia" Manninen
- Children: 3, including Sandra Dickinson
- Relatives: Georgia Tennant (granddaughter); Ty Tennant (great-grandson)
- Scientific career
- Fields: Medicine; Psychiatry

Harold Frederic Searles (September 1, 1918 – November 18, 2015) was an American psychoanalyst who was one of the pioneers of psychiatric medicine specializing in psychoanalytic treatments of schizophrenia. Searles had the reputation of being a therapeutic virtuoso with difficult and borderline patients; and of being, in the words of Horacio Etchegoyen, president of the International Psychoanalytical Association, "not only a great analyst but also a sagacious observer and a creative and careful theoretician".

== Life ==
Searles was born in 1918 at Hancock, New York, a small village in the Catskill Mountains along the Delaware River, which was the subject of many of his reminiscences in his first book, The Nonhuman Environment. He attended Cornell University and Harvard Medical School before joining the US armed services in World War II, where he served as a captain After the war he continued his psychiatric training at the Chestnut Lodge, a private sanitarium in Rockville, Maryland, from 1949 to 1951, then at the Veterans Administration Mental Hygiene Clinic in Washington, D.C., from 1951 to 1952.

In 1949, he started work at Chestnut Lodge, where he stayed for the next fifteen years. His colleagues included Frieda Fromm-Reichmann, to whose philosophy of treatment he acknowledged his personal debt.

Searles retired from his private practice in Washington, D.C., in the mid-1990s and moved to California in 1997, where both of his sons lived.

Searles' wife, Sulvii "Sylvia" Manninen a nurse of Finnish descent, died in 2012, at the age of 93. Thereafter, Searles lived with his younger son, Donald, until Searles' death three years later, on November 18, 2015, aged 97, in Los Angeles. His younger son, Donald, is a Los Angeles-based attorney. Searles' daughter is Sandra Dickinson, a London-based actress. His elder son, David Searle, is a Southern California motorcycle journalist. Searles was survived by three children, five grandchildren and eight great-grandchildren.

== Work ==
=== Countertransference ===
Searles has been singled out as one of the pioneer investigators of the potentially useful role of countertransference, and of the therapist's use of his or her own self in treatment.

In his 1959 article "Oedipal Love in the Countertransference", Searles wrote that he not only fell in Pygmalionesque love with his patients as they recovered, but also told them how he felt. Searles argued that "the patient's self-esteem benefits greatly from his sensing that he (or she) is capable of arousing such responses in his analyst"—a view which can be seen as a forerunner of intersubjective psychoanalysis with its emphasis on the spontaneous involvement of the therapist in terms of countertransference.

In his later paper of 1975, "The Patient as Therapist to his Analyst", Searles argues that everybody has an urge to heal—something only distinguished in the psychotherapist in being tapped into formally. Using the concept of what he called the patient's "unconscious therapeutic initiative",—a precursor of much later thinking on patient/analyst interaction—Searles suggested that psychological illness is related to a disturbance of this natural tendency to heal others; with the surprising corollary that to help a patient the analyst/therapist must really experience the patient as doing something therapeutic for them.

In his 1978–79 article, "Concerning Transference and Countertransference", Searles continued exploring intersubjectivity, building on his belief that "all patients...have the ability to 'read the unconscious' of the therapist". Searles emphasized the importance of the therapist's acknowledging the core of truth around which a patient's transference materializes.

=== Relatedness ===
Searles saw the schizophrenic individual as struggling with the question, not so much of how to relate, but of whether to relate to others. Searles, however, considered this merely as an exacerbated version of the same (if hidden) conflict that affects us all.

Searles' interpersonal ideal – in the formulation of which he was indebted to Martin Buber – was of what he called a mature relatedness, something which involves connection without merging, or the loss of personal boundaries.

=== "The Effort to Drive the Other Person Crazy" ===
In an article of 1959, "The Effort to Drive the Other Person Crazy", Searles examined six modes of interpersonal communication, arguing that "each of these techniques tends to undermine the other person's confidence in his own emotional reactions and his own perception of reality". Among these techniques were switching emotional wavelengths while discussing the same topic; and dealing with different topics (life and death/trivial) while remaining on the same wavelength.

Such attempts at crazy-making were often applied by patients to therapists, who had the task of enduring them without retaliation. Searles added moreover that it was important for the therapist to survive their own wish to kill the patient.

== Influence ==
Arguably, Searles' work was largely ignored in the wider analytic community until the 1980s, when his radical views on the analyst's involvement through countertransference started to become more normative. Since then Jungians in particular have paid increasing attention to his work, linking his findings both to those of Jung and to the work of another maverick analyst, Robert Langs.

Searles has also been associated with Donald W. Winnicott and Hans W. Loewald as psychoanalytic figures who all emphasized the importance of the part played in psychic development by the external environment.

== Bibliography ==
- Searles, Harold F. (1960): The Nonhuman Environment in Normal Development and in Schizophrenia. New York
- Searles, Harold F. (1965): Collected papers on schizophrenia and related subjects. New York: International Universities Press, ISBN 0-8236-0980-4
- Searles, Harold F. (1979): Countertransference and Related Subjects; Selected Papers. New York: International Universities Press, ISBN 0-8236-1085-3
- Searles, Harold F. and Langs, Robert (1980): Intrapsychic and Interpersonal Dimensions of Treatment. A Clinical Dialogue. New York: Jason Aronson
- Searles, Harold F (1986): My Work With Borderline Patients, New York: Jason Aronson, ISBN 1-56821-401-4
