= Like Father Like Son (TV series) =

2005 British crime drama TV series

- Genre: Crime drama
- Created by: Shaun McKenna
- Written by: Shaun McKenna
- Directed by: Nicholas Laughland
- Starring: Robson Green; Jemma Redgrave; Georgia Moffett; Phil Davis; Tara Fitzgerald; Francesca Fowler
- Composer: John Lunn
- Country of origin: United Kingdom
- Original language: English
- No. of series: 1
- No. of episodes: 2 (list of episodes)

Production
- Executive producers: Matthew Arlidge; Douglas Rae
- Producer: Jeremy Gwilt
- Running time: 90 mins. (w/ advertisements)
- Production company: Ecosse Films

Original release
- Network: ITV
- Release: 24 January – 25 January 2005

Like Father, Like Son is a British television crime drama series first broadcast on ITV from 24 to 25 January 2005. The two-part serial stars Robson Green and Jemma Redgrave as the would-be step-father and mother of a young boy who is suspected of a murder of a fellow school pupil, after meeting with his father for the first time since his incarceration for a quadruple murder. The serial achieved good viewing figures, upward of 8m.

The serial was released on DVD on 7 March 2005.

== Critical reception ==
Richard Scheib of the New Zealand Horror and Fantasy Film Review said of the series;

"For a relatively novice screenwriter, Shaun McKenna does an excellent job. The script sets up an interesting divide as to whether the killer is Jemma Redgrave’s son Somerset Prew, who may have been seduced and corrupted by his serial killer father or whether it is Jemma’s fiancée, Robson Green. There is a nice sense of mirroring throughout the script – how Jemma Redgrave’s husband was a killer who secretly strangled women, and how her husband-to-be Robson Green has a secret about his wife being strangled; how both of the prospective suspects had an obsession with Morag; how Jemma suddenly realises that she has gone from one husband who was secretly a killer to discovering that her prospective husband might also secretly be a killer too. These various aspects weave together and apart, circling around differing suspicions with considerable cleverness. It is an extremely adept script. Shaun McKenna even writes a scene that quite takes one aback, which offers up an interpretation of the strangling of Desdemona in Shakespeare’s Othello in terms of sexual jealousy.

Nick Laughland creates some genuinely creepy scenes where young Somerset Prew goes to see his father in jail and we can see the father starting to psychologically play with his mind and draw him into his web. Phil Davis, the actor playing the father, gives a thuggishly nasty performance. He has been made up to look almost albinoid, although the credibility gap here is that Davis is made to seem so uncouth and cruel and as we never get to see any of his charm, we wonder what could possibly attract a nice girl like Jemma Redgrave to him. There is a nicely written scene where Jemma Redgrave goes to see him and pleads for him to leave their son alone, only to be rebuffed with the nasty suggestion that he is entitled to conjugal visits."

== Cast ==
- Jemma Redgrave as Dee Stanton
- Robson Green as Dominic Milne
- Somerset Prew as Jamie
- Georgia Moffett as Morag Tait
- Francesca Fowler as Bethan Milne
- Phil Davis as Paul Barker
- Kenneth Colley as Rawsthorne
- Tara Fitzgerald as D.I. Harkness
- James Barriscale as P.C. Barriscale
- Pippa Haywood as Mrs. Sutton
- Florence Bell as Abi Taylor
