= Dune Drifter =

- Poster for the Leeds International Film Festival
- Directed by: Marc Price
- Screenplay by: Marc Price
- Produced by: Michelle Parkyn
- Starring: Phoebe Sparrow; Daisy Aitkens; Simon Dwyer-Thomas; Richard Corgan; Michael Geary; Marcus Shakesheff; Charlotte Mounter
- Cinematography: Noel Darcy
- Edited by: Marc Price
- Music by: Adam Langston
- Production companies: Dead Pixel Productions; Graham Associates; Hero Productions
- Distributed by: 4Digital Media; Blue Swan Entertainment; Indeed Film; Umbrella Entertainment
- Release dates: 24 October 2020 (FrightFest); 3 November 2020 (Leeds International Film Festival)
- Running time: 96 minutes
- Countries: United Kingdom; Iceland
- Language: English
- Budget: $100,000

Dune Drifter is a 2020 British science fiction film written and directed by Marc Price and produced by Michelle Parkyn. It stars Phoebe Sparrow, Daisy Aitkens, Simon Dwyer Thomas, Alastair Kirton, Richard Corgan, and Michael Geary.

Exterior filming took place in 2019 on location in Iceland, taking advantage of the natural rock formations and geysers to build an otherworldly atmosphere. The interiors of the spaceship cockpits were done in Price's flat, in an effort to reduce budget costs. This was achieved by building a cockpit set and using projectors and backdrops to mimic an outer space atmosphere.

Dune Drifter premiered at the 2020 Frightfest film festival on 24 October 2020, with screenings held at the Leeds International Film Festival on 3 November 2020. It was released on DVD on 1 December 2020.

== Plot ==
The human race, now based at Terra Prime, is at war with an alien race called the Drekk, who have devastated multiple cities on Earth, including New York City, Istanbul, and Quebec City. Adler is Grey 6 gunner, flying through hyperspace with pilot Yaren, as part of Dune Squadron, Reserve Gemini Unit, a squadron of seven Terra Prime space fighters. They receive a video briefing from Colonel Danforth of the starship Valiant, directing them to rendezvous with them at the planet Erebus, where he assumes that Terra Prime forces will have repelled the Drekk. While on-route to the rendezvous, Alder and Yaren troubleshoot an issue with the plasma injector coil of their ship, temporarily fixing the issue.

Upon leaving hyperspace, Dune Squadron see the Valiant under heavy attack, having been overwhelmed by Drekk forces. After Colonel Danforth directs the squadron to assist in the battle, Grey leader, Callaghan, leads an attack on six ships, but the squadrons plasma blasts have little to no effect on the enemy shields. Despite their lacklustre firepower, they manage to destroy one enemy ship, but in the process, the entire squadron, except for Adler and Yaren, is killed. With their ship damaged during the fight, they crash land on the planet Erebus.

As a result of the crash, Adler is knocked unconscious and Yaren is severely injured and dying. With Erebus having a corrosive and toxic atmosphere, Adler, regaining consciousness, is able to move the injured Yaren to an emergency life raft containing a breathable atmosphere, with her spacesuit as protection. In an attempt to call for help, Adler returns to the ship, but realizes that she needs a code to access the communications system. Yaren is able to give her a code, but it does not work. In a last-ditch effort, Adler is able to guess the code, but finds that they are out of range from the Terra Prime fleet.

At night, Adler sees a ship crash-land on Erebus, and using her ship's radio, discovers that it is a Drekk. The following day, Yaren dies of her injuries, having not had the proper medical supplies to treat her wounds. Later in the day, a creature attacks the life raft, deflating it. After a brief struggle, Adler is able to get to her ship, where she manages to kill the creature with the plasma cannon. She then picks up communications from the Valiant, which orders the Terra Prime fleet to retreat, abandoning her on Erebus.

With her life-support dwindling, Adler decides to salvage the plasma injector coil from the crashed Drekk ship, in order to repair her own ship. As she approaches the ship, she encounters a Drekk warrior, who is wearing a plasma-resistant suit, making Adler's pistol ineffective. Giving herself an adrenaline shot, Adler is able to kill the Drekk with a knife. She then makes her way to the ship, and, while attacking the two Drekk warriors guarding it, grabs their rifle and uses it to kill one Drekk, almost destroying the ship in the process. After the fight, she extracts the plasma injector coil and begins to leave. The last warrior spots her and begins shooting at the departing Adler, damaging her rifle, but failing to kill her. At a geyser field, Adler is attacked again by the warrior, and she falls into a cave where her helmet is damaged. The Drekk picks up the plasma injector coil with the aim of taking Adler's ship.

Gradually losing her air supply, Adler crawls back to her ship ahead of the Drekk, where she is able to replace her damaged helmet with Yaren's. When the warrior arrives at her ship, Adler attacks them with plasma blasts from the ship, as well as a rock, eventually killing the Drekk with their rifle. Adler then installs the plasma injector coil into her ship and flies off Erebus, with the Drekk rifle onboard. When a navigation code prompt appears on her screen, remembers the code that Yaren had given her, which is revealed to be an auto-pilot course back to Terra Prime.

== Cast ==
- Phoebe Sparrow as Adler
- Daisy Aitkens as Yaren
- Simon Dwyer Thomas as Erebus Drekks
- Alastair Kirton as Colonel Danforth
- Charlotte Mounter as Callaghan
- Richard Corgan as Kanner
- Michael Geary as Kinnear
- Marcus Shakesheff as Meyln
- Alexander Tol as Farleigh
- Jen Nelson as Hawthorn
- James Groom as Hordern
- Tom Nolan as Ackland
- Linda Louise Duan as Sousie
- Michael Lagin as Ferrier
- Asher Green as Richardson
- Claire Burley as Collins
- Chris Rogers as Squadron Commander Peppard
- Martyn Luke as Erebus Pilot
- Angela Peters as Danning (Blue 5)

== Production ==
=== Filming ===
Exterior filming took place in 2019, on location in Iceland. The scenes were shot over a period of seven days.

The cockpit and space battle scenes were filmed in London, during COVID-19 restrictions, where actors performed in a mock-up of the space fighter cockpit, in a flat.

=== Post-production ===
Due to continued COVID-19 restrictions, all editing and post-production had to be done remotely. Editing was completed by Marc Price.

== Release ==
Dune Drifter premiered at Frightfest on 24 October 2020, with additional screenings taking place throughout November at the Leeds International Film Festival and the Trieste Science+Fiction Festival.

Dune Drifter was released on DVD, on 1 December 2020, with a running time of 96 minutes, and included the Producer's Cut of the film. The DVD also had a behind-the-scenes featurette where Marc Price said his film-making was inspired by the science fiction films of Roger Corman.

== Critical response ==
Rotten Tomatoes scored Dune Drifter 65%, with positive reviews. The film attracted a positive review from Jennie Kermode on Eye for Film, who said "Dune Drifter is an object lesson for all low budget filmmakers. The plot may be simple, the effects work in the opening section may look a bit rough, but the acting is superb and director Marc Price creates a powerful atmosphere. The result punches well above its weight." She also praised Phoebe Sparrow’s performance as Adler: “Sparrow's work is gripping, even though she has to do most of her acting through a visor. We really feel her despair and understand the desperate nature of her situation. Distressing though this is, Adler's determination to keep on fighting for the slenderest of chances makes it impossible not to root for her, and even though familiar genre conveniences are present - from humanoid aliens to guns that miss at all the right times - she makes it easy to suspend disbelief.” Eric Mortensen on Geeky Hobbies welcomed Dune Drifter in 2020, saying that "Dune Drifter has a decent amount of action sequences, but they are spaced out. The movie has a much greater emphasis on the main character just surviving. This means that character development plays a big role in the movie. I think this is one of the film’s greatest strengths. While most of the movie features only one character, I thought the character development was good. The plot is compelling and is well written in my opinion. The movie does a good job telling an interesting story about trying to survive on an alien planet." Following Frightfest in 2020, Dune Drifter was reviewed by Kim Newman, who said Marc Price had delivered an ambitious science fiction film, featuring a simple, gritty story with few frills, and a nice sense of widescreen spectacle.

For Exit 6 Film Festival, Marc Price was interviewed in 2021, about his work, and Dune Drifter was praised for boasting some great miniature and in-camera visual effects for a film with a modest budget. Reviews made comparisons between Dune Drifter, and Enemy Mine, Battlestar Galactica, and Star Wars. Film Authority said that “A week’s shoot in Iceland gives Dune Drifter the look it needs for the alien planet, without having to hit the same green-screen switch that most films hit all too readily. But it’s the space-action that’s more impressive, by dint of practical choices; those who dug the dirty space look of 70’s classics like Star Wars and Battlestar Galactica should apply here. Although filmed in a UK living room, the results look dynamic enough to keep the attention, and make Dune Drifter a cut above the average.”

Starburst magazine said “Punching way above its weight, Dune Drifter does a great job of transporting us to a different world. The first third – set during an epic space battle is fabulously claustrophobic and tense. The CGI is more than adequate and has a Star Wars/Battlestar Gallactica [sic] (the original one) feel. Once on the planet, it’s a fight for survival of a different kind. The introduction of the foe doesn’t lead to a recreation of Enemy Mine, fortunately as there are a number of well-choreographed fights and added trauma.”

Sleeper Awakened said about Dune Drifter, "This is a surprisingly decent effort for a low-budget sci-fi movie. Granted, it lacks in top notch wardrobe, special effects, and script, but that doesn’t mean it can’t throw its middleweight pounds behind its punches to land some stiff shots. The space special effects, on the whole, look solid and do not dissuade you from the reality of the situation. Definitely got some Battlestar Galactica and Wing Commander vibes here."

In 2022, two years after the film was released, Dune Drifter was reviewed by Jim McLennan on Girls with Guns, who commented on “an admirable effort in terms of its budget”, and he also said that Phoebe Sparrow “portrays the heroine with a no-nonsense approach, prepared to do whatever is necessary to survive”.
