= Sink or Swim (TV series) =

- Genre: Sitcom
- Written by: Alex Shearer
- Starring: Peter Davison; Robert Glenister; Sara Corper
- Country of origin: United Kingdom
- Original language: English
- No. of series: 3
- No. of episodes: 19

Production
- Running time: 30 min
- Production company: BBC

Original release
- Network: BBC1
- Release: 4 December 1980 – 14 October 1982

Sink or Swim is a BBC television sitcom created and written by Alex Shearer. It ran for three series between 4 December 1980 and 14 October 1982, and stars Peter Davison as Brian Webber and Robert Glenister as his brother Steve.

Brian lives in a flat above a petrol station in London (in the last series he moved to Newcastle to attend university). He's trying hard to make his way in the world, thus far with limited success. His girlfriend, Sonia, is a very serious minded young woman who is passionate only about things like vegetarianism and ecology. When Brian's younger brother, Steve, arrives in London looking for somewhere to stay, his lazy, cynical, noisy "Northern lout" attitude disrupts Brian's already messy life.

Like Only Fools and Horses, Sink or Swim was filmed in Bristol doubling for London. Shearer later wrote the Nicholas Lyndhurst sitcom The Two of Us for LWT. Production of the sitcom overlapped the first two years of Davison also starring as the Fifth Doctor in Doctor Who, which imposed constraints on the recording schedules.

== Cast ==
- Peter Davison – Brian Webber
- Robert Glenister – Steve Webber
- Sara Corper – Sonia
- Amanda Orton – Sandra (series 1 & 2)
- Ron Pember – Mike Connor (series 1 & 2)
- Gillian Taylforth – Christine (series 2)
- Briony McRoberts – Charlotte (series 3)
- Russell Wootton – Douglas (series 3)

== Episodes and Original Transmission Dates ==
Series 1
1. In The Beginning (4 December 1980)
2. Steve's Girlfriend (11 December 1980)
3. Croydon (18 December 1980)
4. The Turkey (1 January 1981)
5. The Car (8 January 1981)
6. The Boat (15 January 1981)
7. The Interviewer (22 January 1981)

Series 2
1. Tourists (22 October 1981)
2. The Commune (29 October 1981)
3. The Folk Club (5 November 1981)
4. The Marrying (12 November 1981)
5. Ecology (19 November 1981)
6. University or What? (26 November 1981)

Series 3
1. In the Pursuit of Learning (9 September 1982)
2. Nothing But Trouble (16 September 1982)
3. A Sporting Chance (23 September 1982)
4. A Slight Hankering (30 September 1982)
5. Making Amends (7 October 1982)
6. A New Departure (14 October 1982)
