= The Doctor's Daughter =

193 – "The Doctor's Daughter"
- Doctor Who episode

Cast
- Doctor: David Tennant – Tenth Doctor
- Companions: Catherine Tate – Donna Noble; Freema Agyeman – Martha Jones
- Others: Georgia Moffett – Jenny; Nigel Terry – Cobb; Joe Dempsie – Cline; Paul Kasey – Hath Peck; Ruari Mears – Hath Gable; Akin Gazi – Carter; Olalekan Lawal Jr. – Soldier

Production
- Directed by: Alice Troughton
- Written by: Stephen Greenhorn
- Produced by: Phil Collinson
- Executive producers: Russell T Davies; Julie Gardner
- Music by: Murray Gold
- Production code: 4.6
- Series: Series 4
- Running time: 45 minutes
- First broadcast: 10 May 2008

Chronology
← Preceded by "The Poison Sky"	Followed by → "The Unicorn and the Wasp"

"The Doctor's Daughter" is the sixth episode of the fourth series of the British science fiction television series Doctor Who. It was broadcast on BBC One on 10 May 2008.

Set on the planet Messaline, the episode features Georgia Moffett as Jenny, the cloned daughter of the series' protagonist, the alien time traveller the Tenth Doctor. The plot of the episode involves two factions of clones descended from a group of human and alien Hath pioneers, each of whom are seeking to wipe out the other side with a lost artefact called the Source, while the Doctor also comes to accept Jenny as his real daughter.

== Plot ==
The TARDIS takes the Tenth Doctor, Martha and Donna to the planet Messaline. As they emerge from the TARDIS, they are met by human soldiers who force the Doctor to stick his hand into a progenation machine. The Doctor's cloned daughter, whom Donna later names Jenny, emerges from the machine. They are soon confronted by the other occupants of the planet, the Hath. The Hath take Martha hostage. Jenny causes an explosion that traps Martha on the other side of the corridor. Martha tends to an injured Hath and earns their trust. The Doctor and Donna meet with General Cobb, who explains that, initially, the humans were meant to live with the Hath, but a dispute arose over something called "the Source", which Cobb believes has the power to end the war by wiping out the Hath. The Doctor inadvertently reveals the location of the Source to the humans and the Hath. The two sides prepare for battle.

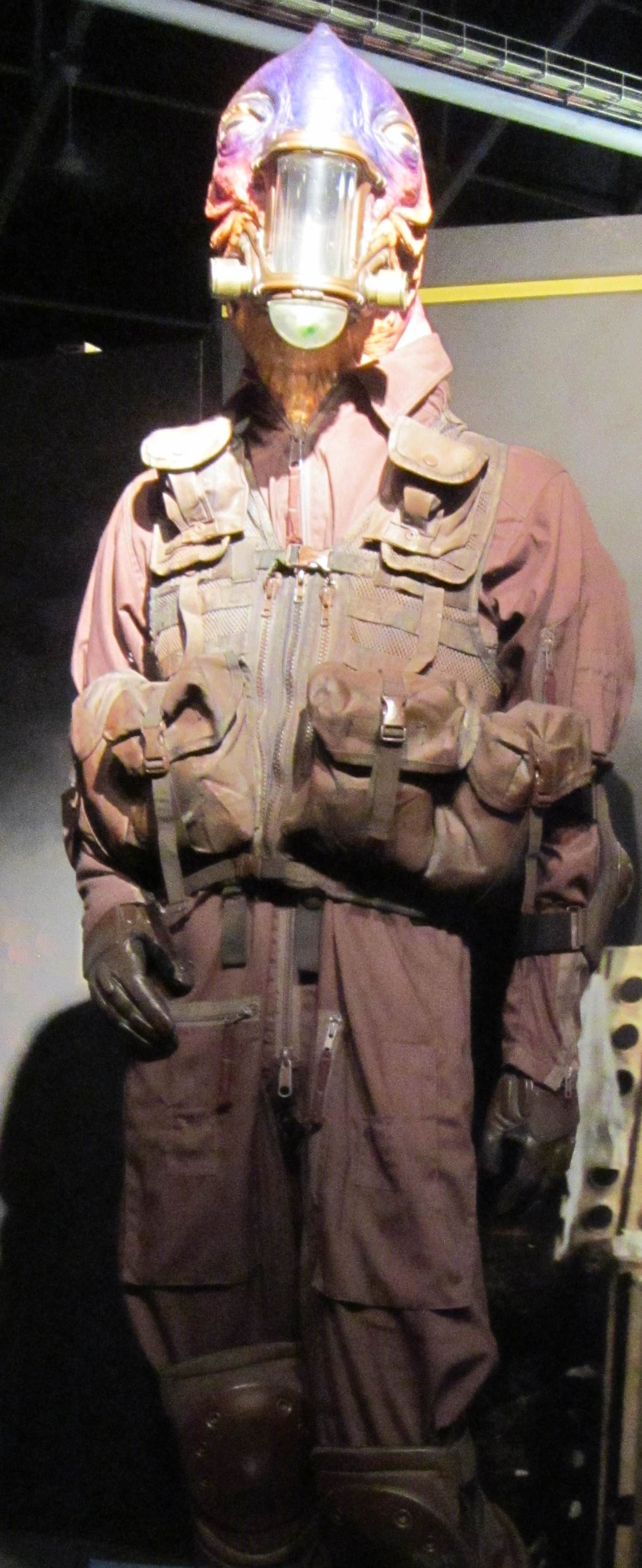
The Hath as they appear at the Doctor Who Experience.

The Doctor confides privately to Donna that he is resistant to Jenny travelling with them because she reminds him too much of everyone who was killed in the Time War. Donna becomes intrigued by a series of numbered plaques that she notices in each room. The Doctor, Donna, and Jenny reach the Source, which is a terraforming device within a colonising spaceship. Donna realises that the plaques represent the dates each part of the building was completed; according to the dates, the ship landed only seven days ago. The humans and Hath have bred so many generations through the progenation machines that their own history has degraded into myth. The Doctor determines the original cause of the conflict was a power vacuum created after the death of the mission commander.

By travelling over the surface with a Hath's help, Martha reunites with the Doctor and Donna near the Source shortly before both armies arrive. The Doctor declares the war to be over and releases the terraforming agent. Cobb tries to shoot the Doctor. Jenny steps in the way and takes a bullet to the chest, and the Doctor holds her as she dies. The Doctor picks up Cobb's gun and holds it to his head, but cannot bring himself to sink to his level. He declares that the humans and Hath should build their new society based on peace. Martha returns home. Meanwhile, on Messaline, Jenny suddenly revives. She then commandeers a rocket and leaves the planet.

== Production ==
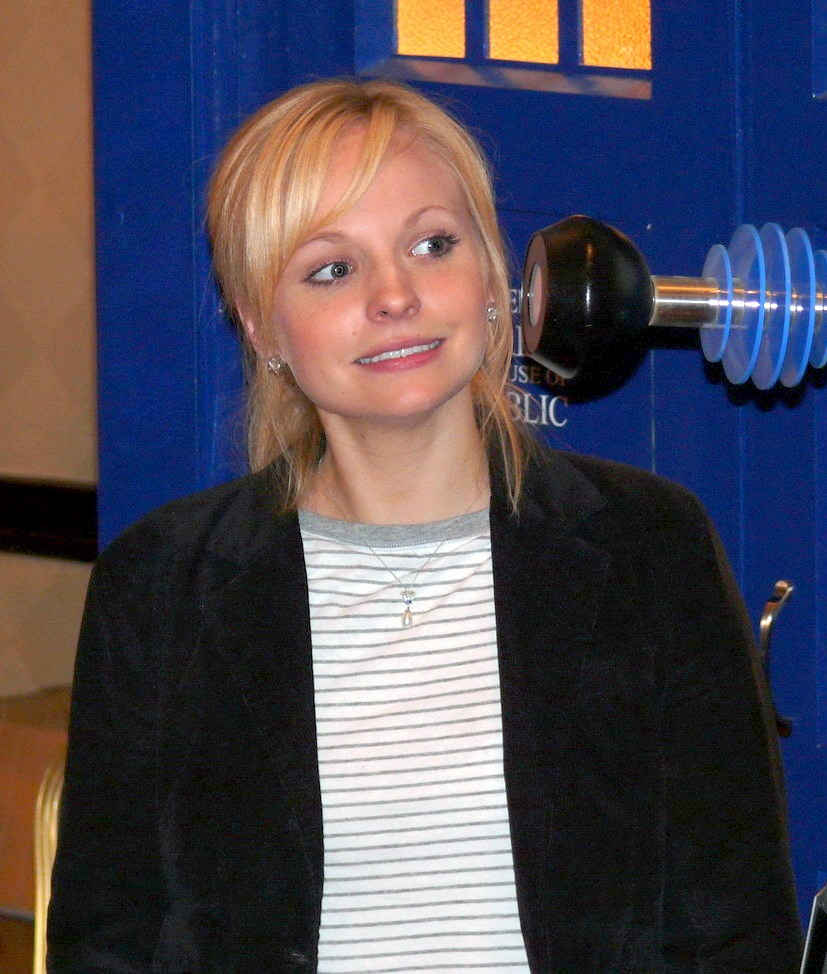
Georgia Moffett, daughter of Fifth Doctor actor Peter Davison, was cast as the title character, Jenny.

=== Writing ===
Russell T Davies has stated that this episode "does exactly as it says on the tin". Jenny's death was originally to take place in what Davies called "a Generic Spaceship Room", but producer Phil Collinson suggested filming the scene at Plantasia botanical garden in Swansea.

Regarding the creation of the character Jenny, series producer Phil Collinson explained, "It came out of a desire to keep pushing David, and keep taking him in new directions, and keep challenging him, really. To suddenly find himself with a member of family is kind of one of the biggest challenges you could give him, so I'm chuffed we did it." Moffett has agreed that giving the character a daughter was "an interesting, emotional, dramatic place for the character to go," while the episode's writer, Stephen Greenhorn, has spoken of the manner in which creating Jenny allowed the show to broach "aspects of the Doctor's past life that we don't often get to discuss, about his previous family that he had and lost in the Time War." Steven Moffat suggested that the character lives in the episode's conclusion.

=== Casting ===
Before being cast as Jenny, Georgia Moffett had previously auditioned for a smaller role in Doctor Who episode "The Unicorn and the Wasp". Phil Collinson revealed that: "As soon as we saw her, we realised there was a much bigger and better part later on in the series... so Georgia kindly waited until the time was right." Coverage of her casting focused on the fact that she is the daughter of Peter Davison, who played the Doctor's fifth incarnation—as the Radio Times stated: "a Doctor's daughter is playing the Doctor's Daughter". Davison has denied that there was any nepotism involved in the casting process, explaining, "She got it off her own bat. I would love to get another part in Doctor Who, I'm certainly not going to get her one first." She has praised her character and the episode in which she appeared, asserting that: "If I'd had to write my ideal part in an episode of Doctor Who it would have been that script." She has also expressed a desire to return to the role, calling on the show's producers to "Bring Jenny back. Please!" Tennant and Moffett, who met on the episode, started dating some time after filming the episode, and married on 30 December 2011.

== Broadcast and reception ==
Unofficial figures indicated that "The Doctor's Daughter" was watched by 6.6 million viewers, giving it a 38.4% share of the total television audience. The final consolidated figure was 7.33 million viewers. While most programmes received lower figures than the previous week, Doctor Who had increased its audience. The top rated programme of the day was still ITV1's Britain's Got Talent, although its audience was down by a million at 8.17 million. Doctor Who was the highest rated programme on BBC1 for the day and had the biggest share of any programme on Saturday. The episode received an Appreciation Index score of 88 (considered "excellent").

"The Doctor's Daughter" received mixed reviews. David Chater of The Times described it as "A wonderful episode – funny, exciting and strangely moving." Martin Anderson of Den of Geek! stated that it was "rather good – though badly plot-holed". He noted that it was yet another episode of Doctor Who "undermined by Murray Gold's incessant music". He also described the episode as "quite redolent of Tom Baker-era Who, with plenty of dark and cheap corridors to run down and two under-manned warring factions for the Doctor to bring peace to". For SFX's Ian Berriman, the running up and down corridors was reminiscent of Lenny Henry's 1985 Doctor Who spoof featured on The Lenny Henry Show. Berriman described the episode as "underwhelming", citing that because one "always suspect[s] she's a redshirt" it is difficult to care for Jenny. Although "reasonably diverting", Berriman argues that budgetary constraints make "the story feel so enclosed" and that the episode's plot, likened to "old-school Trek", seems too similar to that of the Sontaran two-parter immediately prior to this adventure because both involve "militarism" and "cloning". Newsround's Lizo Mzimba also notes the similarities with "The Sontaran Stratagem" and "The Poison Sky". Mzimba asserts that the episode's "biggest problem" is that it tries "to cram an enormous amount into 45 minutes" with most of the "interesting" and new ideas not getting "the attention they deserve" resulting in the audience not caring about either the human fighters or the Hath and thereby limiting a "sense of danger or menace".

Mzimba observes that, since her return in "The Sontaran Stratagem", Martha shares little onscreen time with the Doctor therefore reducing the emotional impact of her departure in this episode. He describes Moffett as "superb", with Berriman calling her "cute as a button". Berriman praises Tennant's performance, but Anderson suggests that Tennant shouts too much. Anderson asserts that "Donna's role as the Doctor's conscience is beginning to take shape" describing this as "refreshing" in a companion and noting that "Tate has toned down the grating voice a tad".

Jenny would later receive a continuation of her story in audio dramas produced by Big Finish Productions, which first released in 2018.
