= Peter Davison =

English actor (born 1951)

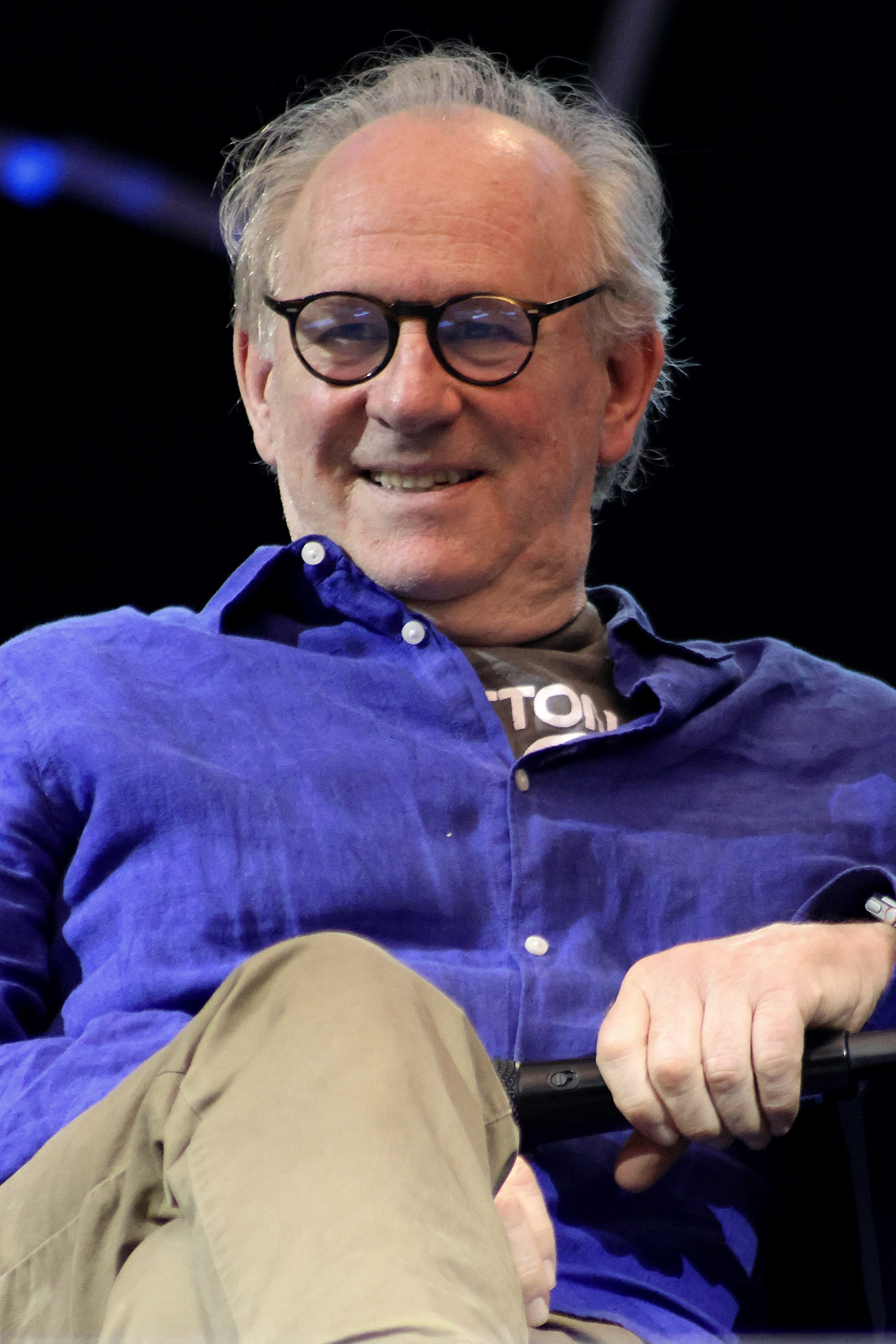
- Davison in 2025
- Born: Peter Malcolm Gordon Moffett; 13 April 1951 (age 75); Balham, London, England
- Education: Royal Central School of Speech and Drama
- Occupation: Actor
- Years active: 1973–present
- Spouses: Diane Russell (m. 1973; div. 1975); Sandra Dickinson (m. 1978; div. 1994); Elizabeth Morton (m. 2003)
- Children: 3, including Georgia Tennant and Louis Davison
- Relatives: David Tennant (son-in-law); Ty Tennant (grandson)
- Peter Davison's voice Davison gives his thoughts on casting a female Doctor for Doctor Who; Recorded 23 January 2018

Peter Malcolm Gordon Moffett (born 13 April 1951), known professionally as Peter Davison, is an English actor. Following his breakthrough role as veterinary surgeon Tristan Farnon in the BBC comedy drama series All Creatures Great and Small (1978–1980, 1988–1990), he achieved international recognition as the fifth incarnation of the Doctor in the BBC science fiction series Doctor Who (1981–1984, 2007, 2022).

Davison began his career on stage, and made his television acting debut in a 1975 episode of the ITV series The Tomorrow People. Following his breakthrough role as Tristan Farnon, he starred in the sitcoms Holding the Fort (1980–1982) and Sink or Swim (1980–1982). At the age of 29, Davison was the youngest actor cast as the Doctor, a record he held until 2009 when Matt Smith was cast as the Eleventh Doctor. Davison left Doctor Who in 1984, but has regularly reprised the role in licensed audio dramas since 1999.

Subsequent leading television roles have included Dr. Stephen Daker in A Very Peculiar Practice (1986–1988), Albert Campion in Campion (1989–1990), David Braithwaite in At Home with the Braithwaites (2000–2003), Dangerous Davies in The Last Detective (2003–2007) and Henry Sharpe in Law & Order: UK (2011–2014). He has also appeared in West End stage productions of Chicago (1998–1999), Spamalot (2007–2008), Legally Blonde (2009–2012) and Gypsy (2015); for the latter he was nominated for a Laurence Olivier Award.

== Early life and education ==
Davison was born Peter Malcolm Gordon Moffett, in Balham, London, on 13 April 1951. (Note: Although many sources state Davison was born in Streatham, Davison himself stated in his 2016 autobiography that he was born in Balham and raised in Streatham.) His father, Claude Moffett, was from British Guiana (now Guyana); he worked as a radio engineer and later opened a grocer's shop. His English mother, Sheila Moffett (née Hallett), worked in intelligence during World War II before becoming a housewife. He had three sisters. On his mixed-race background, Davison noted: "Not a lot of people know about that because I look so damned English".

Davison's family moved to Streatham, and then to Woking in 1961. He attended Winston Churchill School where he acted in plays and became part of the school's orchestra. Davison joined an amateur theatre company called the Byfleet Players, and aged 17 played the lead in a production of Antigone, for which he was nominated for a drama festival Best Actor award. Davison's poor GCE results "drove" him into the acting profession. Prior to applying for drama school, he worked as a mortuary attendant at Brookwood Hospital and a dry cleaner press operator.

Davison studied at the Royal Central School of Speech and Drama from 1969 to 1972. His first television appearance was as an audience member of the Dave Clark Five's 1970 performance on Top of the Pops. Davison played guitar and piano and briefly considered a career as a recording artist; he stated in 2025 that he has "loads of unreleased" self-produced demos.

== Career ==
=== 1973–1978: Early career ===
After graduating in July 1972, he joined the Nottingham Playhouse as an actor and assistant stage manager. He gained his Equity card while working at Nottingham and chose the stage name Peter Davison to avoid confusion with the actor and director Peter Moffatt, whom he later worked with. (Note: Additionally, Davison is not to be confused with Peter Davidson, an older actor active since the 1960s. Some sources incorrectly state that Davidson's role in Warship (1974) was Davison's television debut. Both Davidson and Davison were credited in a 1980 episode of All Creatures Great and Small.) In 1973, Davison joined the Lyceum Young Theatre Group at the Royal Lyceum Theatre in Edinburgh, where he appeared in productions of Hamlet, The Two Gentlemen of Verona and Rosencrantz and Guildenstern Are Dead. Davison played Lysander in a rock musical production of A Midsummer Night's Dream, alongside actress Sandra Dickinson as Hermia; they married in 1978.

Davison appeared alongside Dickinson in his television acting debut as alien cowboy Elmer in "A Man from Emily", a 1975 episode of the ITV children's science fiction series The Tomorrow People. Davison "felt at home" working in television and left his theatre career to pursue work in the medium. Due to difficulty finding work, he subsequently spent 18 months working in a tax office in Twickenham. His acting break came with a major role in the ITV romantic period serial Love for Lydia (1977).

Davison, who "was taking [himself] quite seriously as a songwriter", wrote and recorded the theme music for the television series Mixed Blessings (1978–1980) and co-wrote the theme for Button Moon (1980–1988) with Dickinson. EMI were impressed by Davison's demo tape and offered him a songwriting contract, which he declined—"it was a bad deal and the money was rubbish".

=== 1978–1980: All Creatures Great and Small and breakthrough ===
Davison had his breakthrough role as the mischievous junior veterinarian Tristan Farnon in the BBC comedy drama series All Creatures Great and Small (1978–1980, 1988–1990), based on the books by veterinary surgeon James Herriot about his life in 1930s Yorkshire. Tristan was based on Herriot's colleague Brian Sinclair. Davison met Sinclair whilst rehearsing for the first season, which "was useful because I'd worried about how to make my Tristan endearing even though he behaved appallingly". Davison found it difficult to abandon the character's "posh" voice in subsequent acting roles. Tristan was not intended to be a major character, but Robert Hardy, who played Tristan's brother Siegfried, enjoyed the dynamic between the brothers and asked for Davison to be given more screen time. All Creatures Great and Small attracted 19 million viewers at its height, making Davison a household name. Outside the series, Davison appeared in the ITV Playhouse episode "Print Out" (1979) and hosted the children's series Once Upon a Time (1979–1982) for its first three years.

Davison was an in-demand actor after All Creatures Great and Small's third series concluded in 1980. He took leading parts in the sitcoms Holding the Fort (1980–82) and Sink or Swim (1980–82), and appeared alongside Dickinson as the Dish of the Day in the science fiction comedy series The Hitchhiker's Guide to the Galaxy (1981).

=== 1981–1984: Doctor Who ===
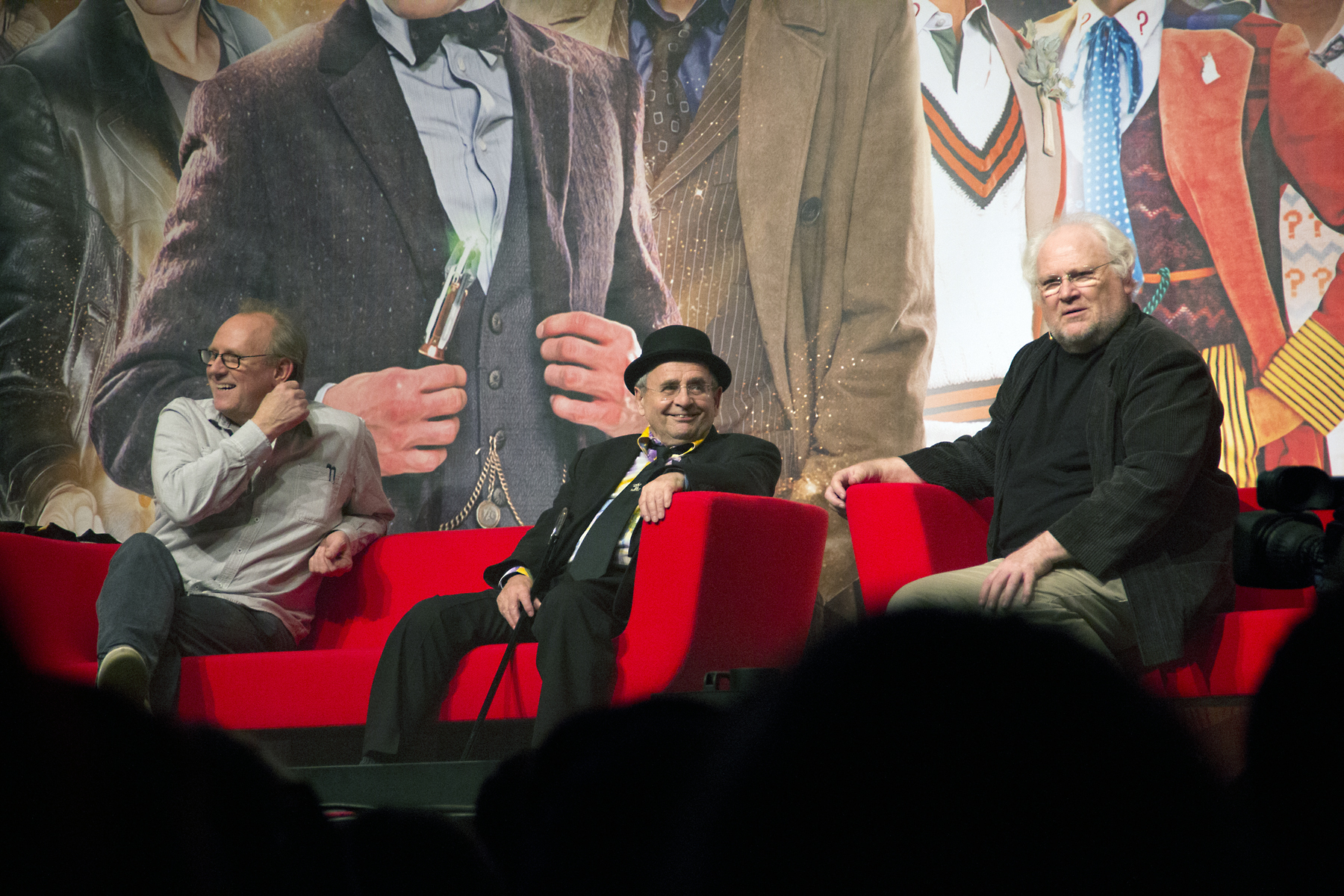
From left: Davison with Sylvester McCoy and Colin Baker at the Doctor Who 50th Anniversary Celebration Weekend in 2013

John Nathan-Turner, producer of the BBC science fiction series Doctor Who, was a former production unit manager on All Creatures Great and Small. Nathan-Turner had a photograph of an All Creatures's charity cricket match, in which Davison took part, on his office wall, and when Tom Baker decided to leave the lead role of the Doctor in 1981, Nathan-Turner was inspired to cast Davison as the series' fifth lead actor. Davison initially turned down the role, but following a lunch with Nathan-Turner he was finally persuaded as he felt he couldn't watch another actor take the part. He made his debut as the Fifth Doctor in the final scene of Logopolis (1981). At the age of 29, Davison was the youngest actor to play the lead role—a record he held until the casting of 26-year-old Matt Smith in 2009—and was also the first actor in the role who had grown up watching the series. The production team sought to deliberately distinguish the new Doctor from Tom Baker's highly popular portrayal. Davison played the part as "an old man trapped in a young man's body". His more innocent and vulnerable take on the character constrasted with his authoritative, middle-aged predecessors. Davison's profile resulted in Doctor Who receiving increased attention from viewers. Viewing figures for season 19 (1982), his first season in the role, more than doubled from season 18 (1980–1981). In 2008, Davison criticised the writing on the series during his tenure, saying there were "some very suspect scripts we did, knocked off by TV writers who'd turn their hand to anything", which he contrasted with the later revived series and Big Finish Productions's licensed audio dramas. He also criticised the writing of the Doctor's companions: "They were struggling for many years to make the companions more rounded characters and... they never once thought it was a good idea to put any frisson or sexual tension - even in its most innocent form - between the Doctor and companion. I think it would make it easier to write a better character." He was also unhappy with the series's production values, particularly the special effects in Time-Flight (1982).

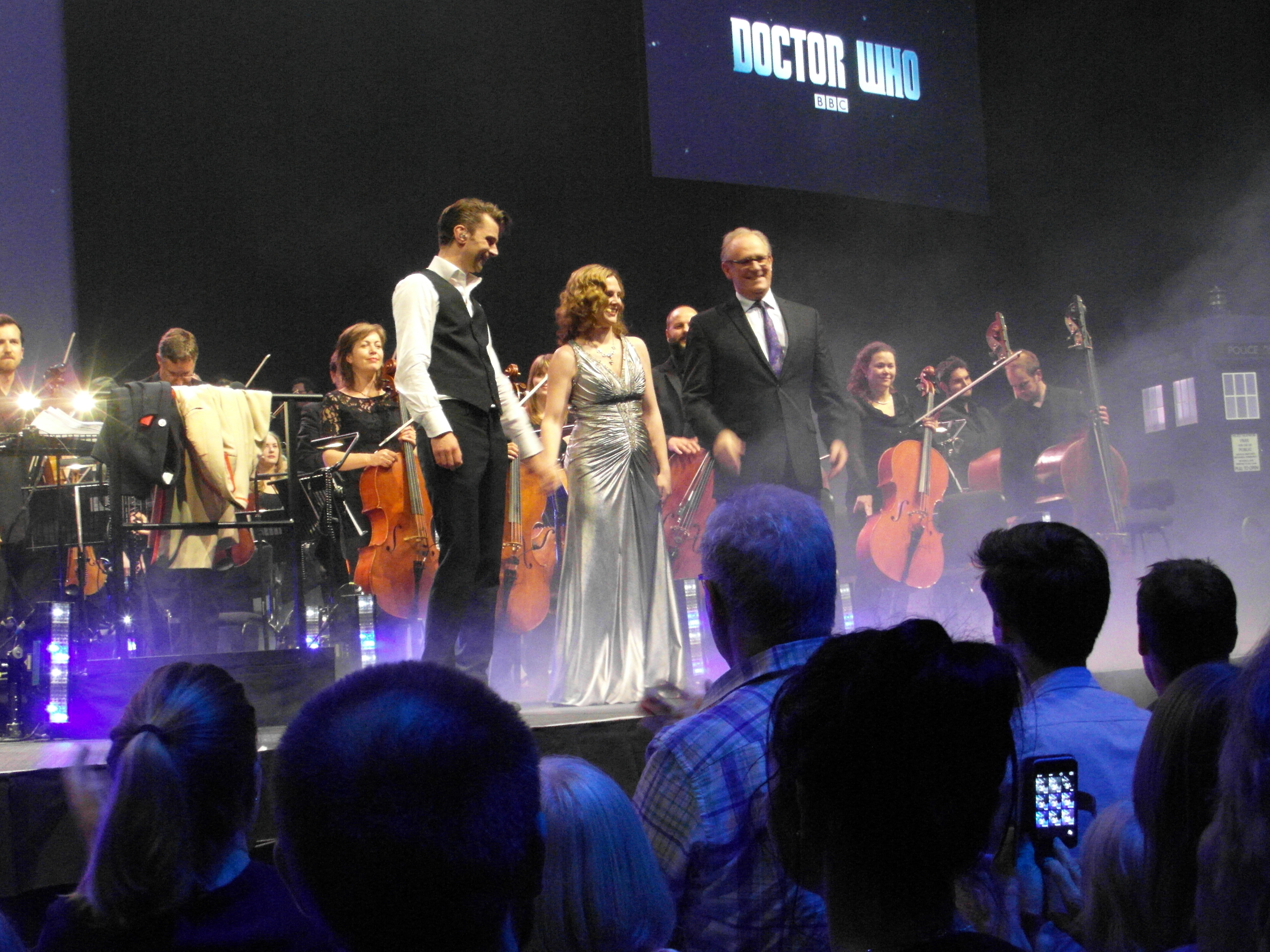
Davison at the Doctor Who Symphonic Spectacular in Leeds, 2015

At 30 years old, Davison was the subject of an episode of the reality documentary series This Is Your Life (1982); he was surprised by host Eamonn Andrews while participating in a Doctor Who promotional event in Trafalgar Square. Over Christmas 1982, Davison and Dickinson both appeared in Nathan-Turner's pantomime Cinderella in Royal Tunbridge Wells. Davison enjoyed his second season of Doctor Who less than his first: "I think it got just a little bit dull, and the stories a bit overcomplex. I didn’t feel that I had a lot of room to embellish the character." His tenure as the Doctor coincided with the series's 20th anniversary; he starred in the special episode "The Five Doctors", broadcast November 1983, in which his predecessors Patrick Troughton and Jon Pertwee reprised their roles. Between seasons, Davison appeared in All Creatures Great and Small's 1983 Christmas special.

By the end of Davison's second season he had to decide whether to stay beyond a third season. He followed advice given by Troughton—whom he had chanced upon in a BBC car park shortly after taking the role—to only stay for three years. Davison was also envious of his contemporaries who were moving between different projects. The final serial of Davison's tenure, The Caves of Androzani (1984), is considered by Doctor Who fans to be one of the series's best. Davison has named Androzani as his favourite serial from his time on the show, owing to Robert Holmes's script and Graeme Harper's direction, and stated in 2016 that if Androzani had been produced a year earlier, he may have stayed for a fourth season. In 2018, he stated that he was "very happy" to have left in 1983 to the BBC's poor management of Doctor Who during the tenure of his successor Colin Baker. Media critics Alistair McGown and Mark Wright have noted that, in comparison to his predecessors, Davison managed to avoid typecasting after leaving the role of the Doctor.

=== 1984–1993: Further television roles and return to theatre ===
Throughout summer 1984, Davison and Dickinson toured the United Kingdom with a stage production of Barefoot in the Park. He presented episodes of Jackanory, reading The Sheep-Pig (broadcast 1984), and later Tom's Sausage Lion (broadcast 1987), Through the Looking Glass (broadcast 1990) and The Real Thief (broadcast 1991). He also presented the instructional driving show L-Driver (1984). Davison took the role of Henry Mynors in the period drama series Anna of the Five Towns (1985). The same year, he appeared in the American crime drama series Magnum, P.I. and the BBC murder mystery series Miss Marple. He reprised his role of Tristan Farnon in All Creatures Great and Small's 1985 Christmas special. Davison also appeared in the BBC Radio 4 series King Street Junior (1985–1986).

Davison played Dr Stephen Daker, the central character in the BBC Two satirical drama series A Very Peculiar Practice (1986–1988) written by Andrew Davies. Daker is a naive everyman physician working at a university health centre full of surreal characters. Davison later stated that the series is "probably number one or two out of everything I've been in". In 2010, The Guardian ranked the series at number five in their list of "The Top 50 TV Dramas of All Time".

Davison reprised his role as Tristan Farnon in a revival of All Creatures Great and Small from 1988 and 1990. He played the titular detective in Campion (1989–1990), a BBC drama series based on the period whodunnit novels by Margery Allingham. He subsequently appeared in the sitcom Fiddlers Three (1991) and the legal drama Kinsey (1992).

From 1988 to 1990, Davison appeared in a second run of All Creatures Great and Small. He starred in the 1992 television film A Very Polish Practice, a sequel to A Very Peculiar Practice which saw Stephen Daker living and working in Poland. Davison reprised his role as the Fifth Doctor in the Doctor Who 30th anniversary charity special Dimensions in Time (1993), alongside every surviving actor to have played the Doctor. He also starred in the 1993 television film Harnessing Peacocks, based on the 1985 novel by Mary Wesley. Davison also appeared in various stage productions, such as Arsenic and Old Lace at the Chichester Festival Theatre and Arthur Miller's The Last Yankee at the Young Vic Theatre.

=== 1994–2007: At Home with the Braithwaites and ITV roles ===
Shortly after Davison's divorce from Sandra Dickinson in 1994, he struggled to obtain acting work. Davison believed that casting directors felt he had been over-exposed on television and had "just got a bit sick to death of me". Davison played characters inspired by the Doctor in several direct-to-video productions, including The Airzone Solution (1993) and three films in the P.R.O.B.E. series: The Zero Imperative (1994), The Devil of Winterborne (1995) and Ghosts of Winterborne (1996). He appeared in a 1994 stage production of An Absolute Turkey at the Globe Theatre.

Davison's first role in a theatrically-released film was as Squire Gordon in Black Beauty (1994). He played Clive Quigley in the sitcom Ain't Misbehavin' (1994–1995) and presented the BBC astronomy series Heavenly Bodies (1995). He also appeared in the David Nobbs television movie Cuts (1996) and played Tony Wendice in a 1996 stage production of Dial M for Murder at the Apollo Theatre. He provided dialogue for the video game Doctor Who: Destiny of the Doctors (1997).

Davison starred as DI Maurice Birt in the ITV television film The Stalker's Apprentice (1998) and as Joseph Lockwood in a 1998 television film adaptation of Wuthering Heights. He also guest-starred in the television series Verdict (1998), Jonathan Creek (1998) and Hope and Glory (1999). Davison appeared in Michael Winner's 1999 black comedy film Parting Shots, which was poorly reviewed. From 1998 to 1999, Davison appeared as Amos Hart in the musical Chicago at the Adelphi Theatre.

Davison co-starred with Colin Baker and Sylvester McCoy in The Sirens of Time (1999), the first of Big Finish Productions' licensed Doctor Who audio dramas. Davison regularly reprised his role as the Fifth Doctor in Big Finish's Main Range series until its conclusion in March 2021, with the character's stories continuing in the ongoing series The Fifth Doctor Adventures. Davison has characterised Big Finish's writing as being better than the writing during his time on the show. In 1999, Davison appeared as himself in "The Kidnappers", a comedy sketch for BBC Two's Doctor Who Night in which he is kidnapped by Doctor Who fans (David Walliams and Mark Gatiss).

In 2000, Davison re-established his image as a television leading man with his role as David Braithwaite in At Home with the Braithwaites (2000–2003), an ITV comedy drama series about a dysfunctional family which wins the lottery. Davison stated in 2016 that A Very Peculiar Practice and At Home with the Braithwaites were the best-written television series in which he had acted. He appeared in the role of Inspector Christmas in the BBC crime drama series Mrs Bradley Mysteries; the 2000 episode "Death at the Opera" saw Davison appear alongside his future son-in-law David Tennant. In 2001, Davison played Dr Moulineaux in Under the Doctor at the Comedy Theatre in the West End.

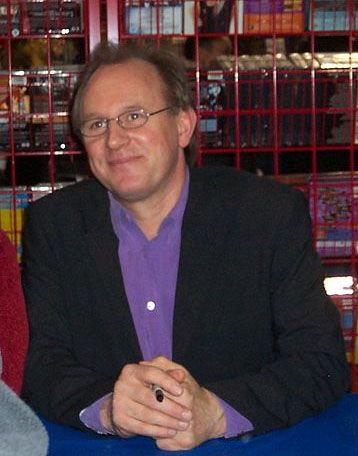
Davison in Toronto, 2004

Following his role as David Braithwaite, Davison took various leading roles in ITV drama series. He played Robert Lewis in Too Good to Be True (2003), starred as Dangerous Davies in The Last Detective (2003–2007), played Dr Bill Shore in Distant Shores (2005–2008) and appeared as Professor George Huntley in The Complete Guide to Parenting (2006). He also appeared as a fictionalised version of himself in a 2004 episode of the ITV sitcom Hardware. Davison also took part in BBC radio series: he played Dr Anthony Webster in the comedy series Rigor Mortis (2003, 2006), and made a guest appearance in the science fiction comedy series Nebulous (2006).

Davison starred as Martin Chadwick in the BBC Two comedy series Fear, Stress & Anger (2007); Martin's daughter was played by Davison's real-life daughter Georgia. For his role, Davison was awarded the Golden Nymph Award for Outstanding Actor in a Comedy at the Monte Carlo Television Festival. He guest-starred in the Agatha Christie's Marple episode "At Bertram's Hotel" (2007). Davison briefly returned to Doctor Who in "Time Crash" (2007), a charity minisode for Children in Need in which the Fifth Doctor meets the Tenth Doctor (David Tennant).

=== 2007–present: Later work ===
From July 2007 to March 2008, Davison played King Arthur in the West End production of Spamalot. He guest-starred in the detective series Midsomer Murders (2008) and played Simon Draycott in a 2008 radio adaptation of Douglas Adams's 1988 book The Long Dark Tea-Time of the Soul. Davison appeared in Unforgiven (2009), an ITV drama serial starring Suranne Jones and written by Sally Wainwright. He guest-starred in the sitcom Miranda (2009), and had a small role in Micro Men (2009), a drama about the rise of the British home computer market. He played Denis Thatcher in the Channel 4 drama serial The Queen (2009), opposite Lesley Manville as Margaret Thatcher.

In 2011, Davison joined the fifth season of Law and Order: UK as Henry Sharpe, the Director of the London Crown Prosecution Service (CPS). From 2009 to 2012, Davison played Professor Callahan in the West End production of Legally Blonde at the Savoy Theatre. He guest-starred in the drama series New Tricks (2011). From 2012 to 2014, he played Richard Lyons in the BBC Radio 2 comedy series Welcome to Our Village, Please Invade Carefully. In 2013, he played Michael in the comedy television series Pat and Cabbage, opposite his former A Very Peculiar Practice co-star Barbara Flynn. He also guest-starred in the detective series Lewis (2013).

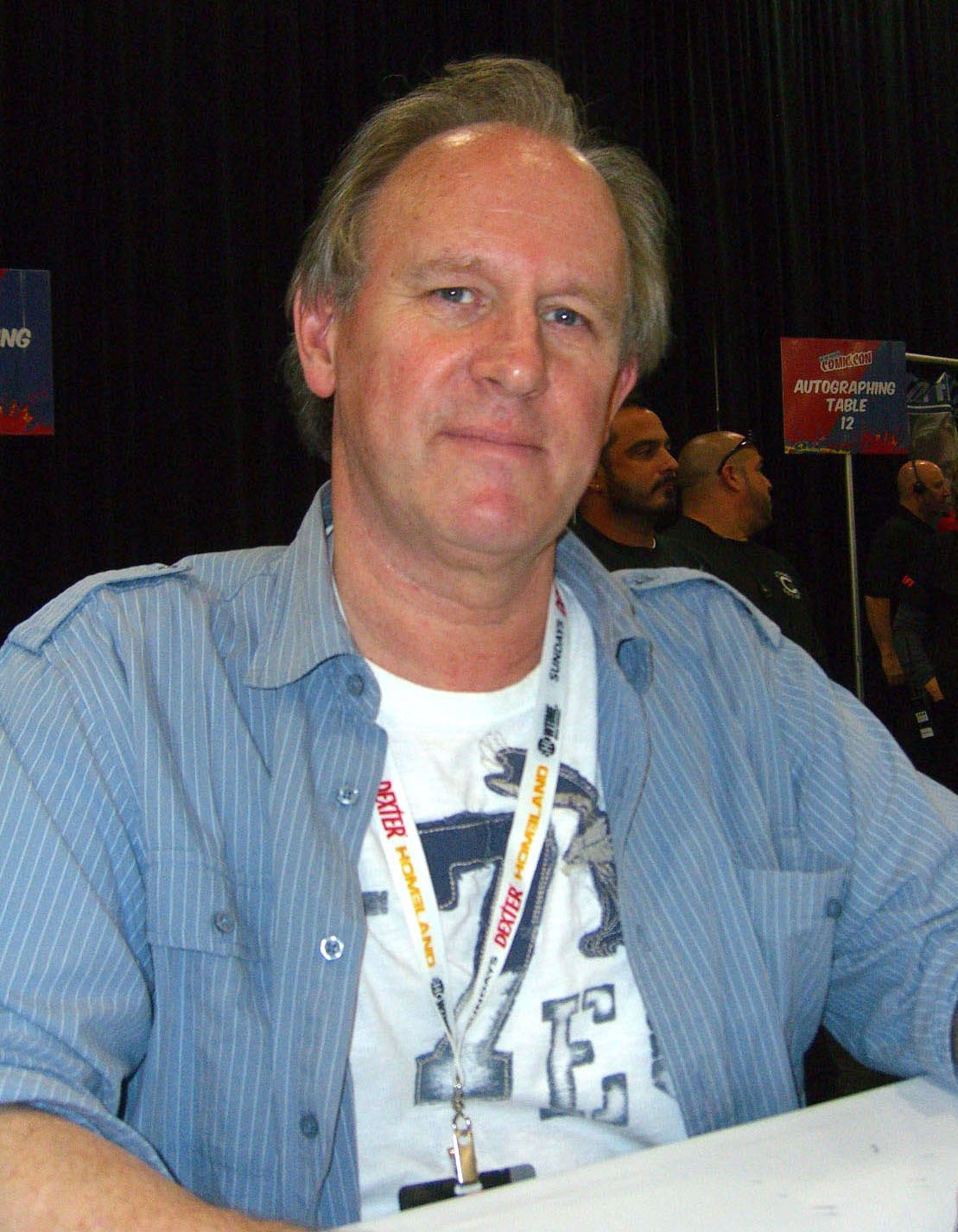
Davison at the 2012 New York Comic Con

Davison and the other "classic" Doctors were not invited to take part in Doctor Who's 50th anniversary special "The Day of the Doctor" (2013). In response, Davison, with support from the BBC, wrote and directed the comedy short film The Five(ish) Doctors Reboot (2013) in his professional directorial debut. Davison, Colin Baker and Sylvester McCoy play fictionalised versions of themselves who attempt to trespass onto the Doctor Who set. Many of his family and friends appear as themselves, including his daughter Georgia, who also produced the film. The Five(ish) Doctors Reboot was released on the BBC Red Button service after the broadcast of "The Day of the Doctor" on 23 November 2013, and was nominated for the 2014 Hugo Award for Best Dramatic Presentation, Short Form.

Davison guest-starred in the series Death in Paradise (2014) and played a fictionalised version of himself in the sitcom Toast of London (2014–2015). He played Oliver Lucas in a 2014 production David Hare's play The Vertical Hour at the Park Theatre. In 2015, Davison joined the cast of Gypsy in its West End transfer to the Savoy Theatre in London, playing the role of Herbie, alongside Imelda Staunton as Rose and Lara Pulver as Louise. For his performance, he was nominated for Best Actor in a Supporting Role in a Musical at the 2016 Laurence Olivier Awards. Davison made a cameo appearance in Daisy Aitkens' 2017 film You, Me and Him. He guest-starred as solicitor Geoff Towler in the third series of Grantchester (2017), which saw him wearing cricket whites, which drew parallels to his Doctor Who costume.

After Jodie Whittaker was cast as the Thirteenth Doctor in July 2017, Davison called her a "terrific actress" but argued that her casting resulted in "the loss of a role model for boys". Davison had previously said he had "a slight problem" with a female incarnation of the Doctor, which he compared to having "a female James Bond", adding that "if you have an uncertain, fallible female Doctor with a really strong male companion, you've got more of a stereotype than anything else". Davison closed his Twitter account following the online backlash to his comments, saying the "toxicity" from the series's viewers on both sides of the dispute had been "sobering".

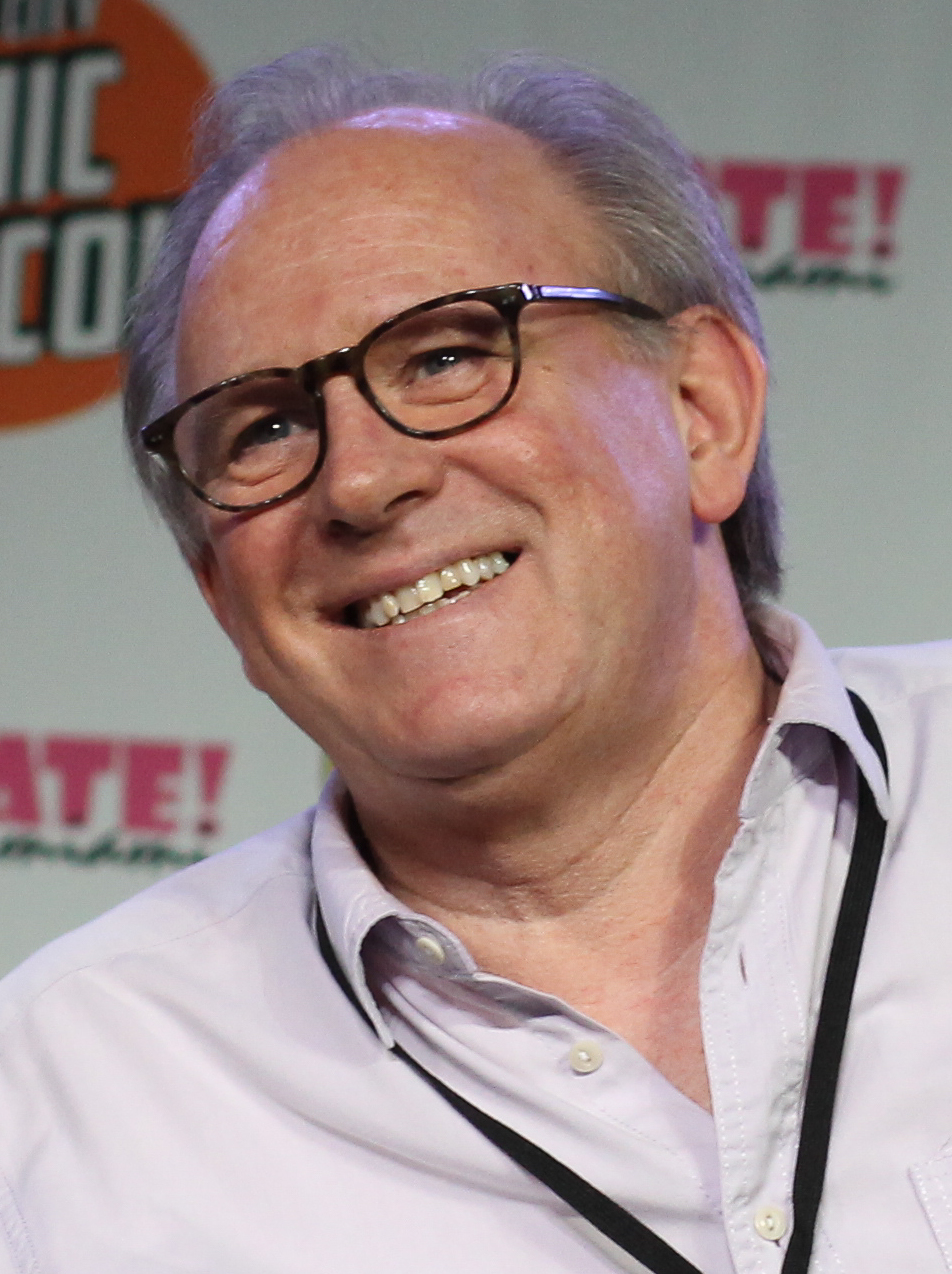
Davison at the Magic City Comic Con in 2016

Davison appeared in the 2018 comedy films Patrick and Say My Name. He played William Priestley, a cousin of Anne Lister, in the historical drama series Gentleman Jack (2019–2022). Davison and Christopher Timothy appeared in the travel programme Great British Car Journeys (2018). The series was recommissioned for a second series. Davison narrated the tenth season of Channel 5's documentary series, The Yorkshire Vet, which follows a number of veterinarians working in Wetherby, Kirkbymoorside and Huddersfield. Christopher Timothy had been the programme's narrator since the start of the series, but due to production difficulties brought on by the COVID-19 pandemic lockdowns, Davison took over the role. Davison played Lord Avery in the 2020 sports comedy drama film Dream Horse.

In the 2022 Doctor Who special "The Power of the Doctor", Davison returned for a cameo appearance alongside Colin Baker, Sylvester McCoy and Paul McGann as a manifestation of the Thirteenth Doctor's subconscious. Davison reprised his role as the Fifth Doctor in Tales of the TARDIS (2023) to mark Doctor Who's 60th anniversary. In 2024, Davison joined the cast of the musical Kiss Me, Kate at the Barbican Theatre, playing the part of the General. Davison and Janet Fielding reprised their roles as the Fifth Doctor and Tegan Jovanka in the Doctor Who mini-episode "Destination: Daleks", released in December 2025.

In June 2026, it was announced that Davison was joining the cast of season 4 of the crime drama series The Good Ship Murder.

== Personal life ==
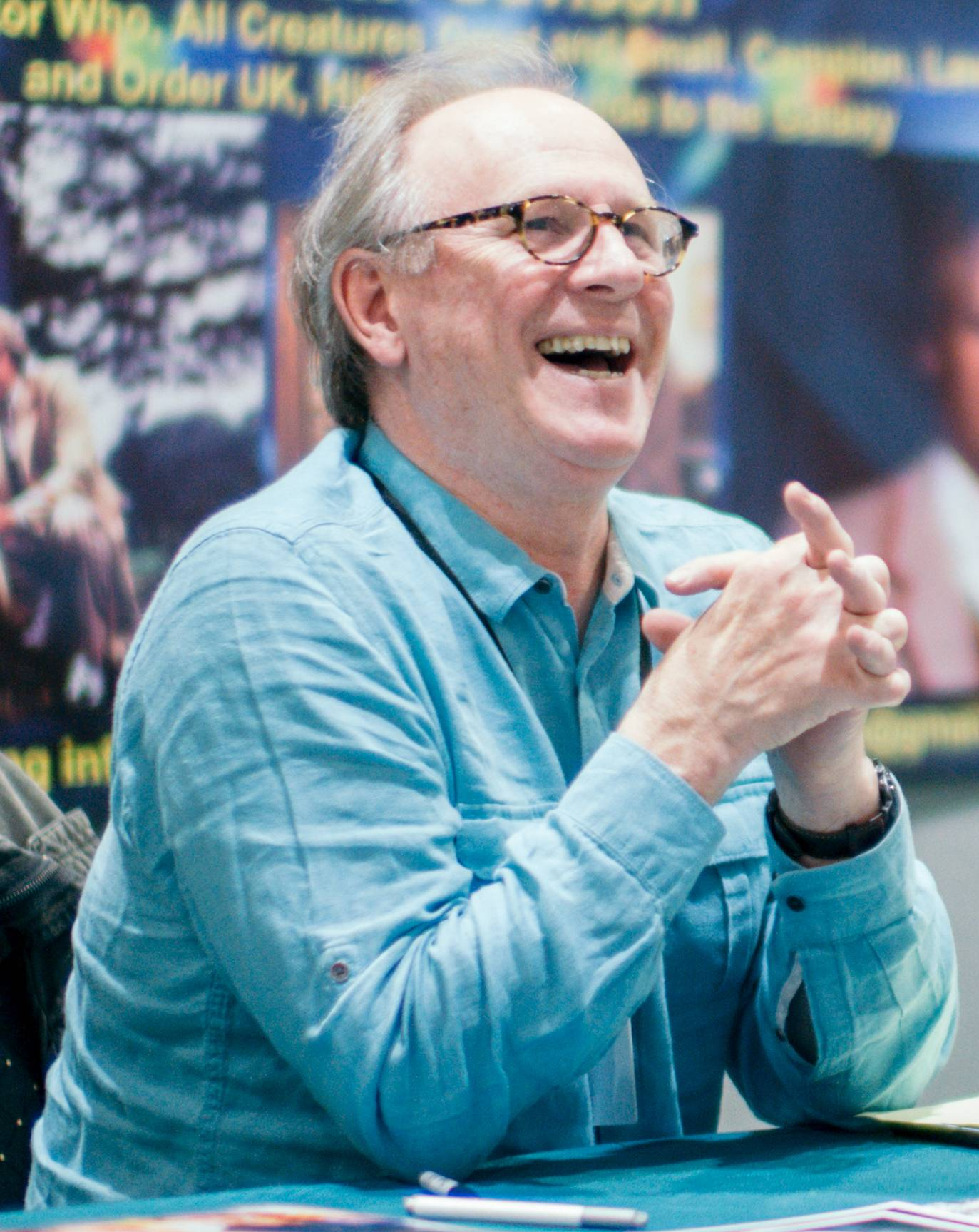
Davison at London Comic Con in 2016

Davison has been married three times. He married Diane Russell in 1973; they divorced in 1975.

Davison and American-born actress Sandra Dickinson married in Maryland on 26 December 1978. The couple had a daughter, Georgia, in 1984, and divorced in 1994. Notably, Georgia played the Doctor's daughter in a 2008 episode of Doctor Who, and in 2011 she married actor David Tennant, who played the Tenth Doctor.

Davison met his third wife, actress and writer Elizabeth Morton, while working on At Home with The Braithwaites. The couple married in 2003 and have two sons, Louis and Joel, both actors.

Davison's autobiography, Is There Life Outside the Box?: An Actor Despairs, was published in 2016.

=== Political views and activism ===
In April 2010, Davison declared his support for the Labour Party at the general election of that year. In the election campaign, he narrated one of Labour's election broadcasts. He was also one of 48 celebrities who signed a letter warning voters against Conservative Party policy towards the BBC.

Davison publicly supported the UK's membership of the European Union in the 2016 EU referendum, describing Brexit supporters as "mad old farts who want to return the country to an age that never existed".

Davison is a patron of the Down's Syndrome Association and the Williams Syndrome Foundation.

== Awards and nominations ==
Year	Organizations	Category	Work	Result	Ref.
2007	Monte-Carlo Television Festival	Outstanding Actor in a Comedy	Fear, Stress & Anger	Won	
2016	Laurence Olivier Awards	Best Actor in a Supporting Role in a Musical	Gypsy	Nominated	
