= Colin (film) =

- Theatrical release poster
- Directed by: Marc Price
- Written by: Marc Price
- Produced by: Marc Price
- Starring: Alastair Kirton; Dominic Burgess; Daisy Aitkens
- Cinematography: Marc Price
- Edited by: Marc Price
- Music by: Dan Weekes; Jack Elphick
- Release date: 15 November 2008 (Aberystwyth Abertoir Film Festival)
- Running time: 97 minutes
- Country: United Kingdom
- Language: English
- Budget: £45

Colin is a 2008 British zombie film written and directed by Marc Price. After a successful run in a number of film festivals, it went on to be shown at Cannes in 2009. Applauded for its success despite its low budget, the total cost of production was reportedly £45. The director, actor and comedian Marc Price, shot Colin on a standard definition Panasonic mini-dv camcorder that he had owned for 10 years and edited the film on his home PC using Adobe Premiere 6 software which had come bundled with a video capture card he'd purchased a few years earlier. Facebook and Myspace were used to gather actors to play the zombies.

== Plot ==
Injured in the arm, Colin arrives home to the house he shares with Damien only to find it empty. While cleaning his wound in the kitchen sink, he is attacked by Damien, now a zombie. He manages to "kill" Damien by stabbing him multiple times in the head with a kitchen knife, but soon afterward, dies.

Now a zombie, Colin wanders the streets of London during the onset of a zombie apocalypse. He acquires the usual zombie cannibal taste for human flesh but avoids conflict.

That evening, zombies invade a house party and kill everyone within. Colin follows the sole survivor of the carnage before she is trapped by a madman / serial killer in his basement with a group of blinded zombies. Colin is mugged for his trainers and seen by his sister Linda, who rescues him.

Linda and her boyfriend take Colin to their mother's house, but he cannot recognize them. He fights and snarls. Linda was bitten by Colin when she saved him from the muggers and dies. She reanimates locked in the kitchen with Colin. In a heartbreaking fit of anger and grief, her boyfriend beats up (dead) Colin, who just shambles away.

Another group of survivors go on the offensive. Led by Slingshot Guy, the humans attack a large group of zombies with homemade weapons and a makeshift bomb. It explodes near Colin, destroying his hearing and most of his face. Three of the humans are bitten during the fight and plead for their lives before being brutally killed by the rest of the group because they will turn.

Colin finds his way to his friend Laura's home, where the film cuts to a flashback to when he was still human. Arriving at the house, he discovered that Laura had trapped a zombie in the bathroom. While attempting to kill the zombie, she was bitten and died in his arms, before reanimating and biting him. He then killed her before going home, which brings the viewer back to the film's beginning.

== Cast ==
- Alastair Kirton as Colin
- Daisy Aitkens as Linda
- Dominic Burgess as Pots
- Tat Whalley as Boyfriend
- Leanne Pammen as Laura
- Kate Alderman as False Laura
- Justin Mitchell Davey as Slingshot Guy
- Kerry Owen as Colin's mother
- Leigh Crocombe as Damien
- Rami Hilmi as Helpful Guy with Crowbar
- Helena Martin as Pots' wife

== Production ==
As a fan of zombie films, Marc Price wanted to do something different by telling a story from the zombie's perspective, not being aware of I, Zombie from 1998. Although I, Zombie handles the topic differently, with the protagonist gradually deteriorating over the full film, Price said that if he had known about its existence, he probably wouldn't have made Colin.

The film was shot in London using friends and professionals who worked free to build their portfolio. Shooting took 18 months.

== Soundtrack ==
- Dan Weekes: "Colin's Theme"
- Spencer McGarry Season: "The Unfilmable Life and Life of Terry Gilliam"
- Jack Elphick: "Intro"; "Colin Broke My Keyboard"; "Boorman Lake"
- Simon Bevan: "RunAway" (acoustic)

== Release ==
=== Screenings ===
The film was screened on 15 November 2008 at the Abertoir horror festival, where it drew the attention of sales agent Helen Grace of Left Films.

It then played at the Cannes film Market and the Cannes Lions International Festival of Creativity, Saatchi & Saatchi presentation of new directors, 25 June 2009.

On 13 July 2009, the film had a special screening at Zombie-Aid in Manchester, with cast and crew present for Q & A.

On 27 July 2009, it was announced that the film would be distributed to cinemas and DVD by Kaleidoscope Home Entertainment (UK). A preview was shown during the Frightfest fantasy and horror film festival in London during August 2009. It was released in cinemas both in London and other major UK cities during Halloween.

During November 2009, it was shown during the 19th Málaga Fantastic Film Festival (Fancine) in Spain as part of the Horror Zone section.

During September 2010, Walking Shadows announced a release in the US.

=== DVD release ===
It was released on DVD in October 2010 in the US. A two-disc Special Edition DVD has been released.

== Reception ==
Rotten Tomatoes, a review aggregator, reports that 46% of 26 surveyed critics gave the film a positive review; the average rating was 4.6/10. Writing in Sight and Sound, Michael Brooke commended the film's ambiance of panic, assisted by the relative intimacy of a handheld camcorder as the principal instrument of filming. As a character, Colin is argued to be a sympathetic character despite his revenant status, comparable to Bub in Romero's Day of the Dead. Nigel Floyd of Time Out London rated it 2/5 stars and called it an "overlong, non-frightening" film that "shambles fitfully from one scene to the next, without ever achieving any momentum or sense of direction." Carmen Gray of Total Film rated the film 3/5 stars and wrote, "If a Credit Crunch Oscar existed, his DIY chutzpah would take the gong." Phillip French of The Observer called it "confused, unoriginal and unimaginative". Peter Bradshaw of The Guardian rated it 3/5 stars and called it "a ultra-minimal, ultra-experimental future-shock". Joshua Siebalt of Dread Central rated it 3.5/5 stars and wrote, "For a first-time effort, Colin shows a helluva lot of promise." Writing in The Zombie Movie Encyclopedia, Volume 2, academic Peter Dendle said, "No one will mistake the final product for polished art ... yet there is no question that Price offers a fresh, provocative approach to a zombie apocalypse." In a 2012 interview with GQ, filmmaker Martin Scorsese said "I saw one [zombie movie] late at night one weekend. It was called Colin, by a young filmmaker [Marc Price]. He shot it, I think, digitally by himself, edited it himself. It was savage. It had an energy that took the zombie idea to another level. Really interesting filmmaking. Disturbing."

== See also ==
- Zombie apocalypse
- List of zombie films
