= Fear, Stress & Anger =

- Genre: Sitcom
- Directed by: Martin Dennis
- Starring: Peter Davison; Pippa Haywood; Georgia Tennant; Daisy Aitkens
- Country of origin: United Kingdom
- No. of series: 1
- No. of episodes: 6

Production
- Producer: Sue Vertue
- Editor: Paul Machliss
- Running time: 30 minutes
- Production company: Hartswood Films

Original release
- Network: BBC Two
- Release: 22 February – 29 March 2007

Fear, Stress & Anger is a British sitcom that aired on BBC Two in 2007. Starring Peter Davison and Pippa Haywood, it was written by Michael Aitkens. There is no studio audience or laugh track.

== Cast ==
- Peter Davison – Martin Chadwick
- Pippa Haywood – Julie Chadwick
- Georgia Tennant – Chloe Chadwick
- Daisy Aitkens – Lucy Chadwick
- Eileen Essell – Gran
- Jeff Rawle – Duncan Amis
- Suzanne Burden – Sarah Amis
- Katherine Parkinson – Gemma

== Plot ==
Martin Chadwick is a middle-aged (born 1956) advertising executive whose job is downsized, and he is forced to work at home, only having contact with one colleague, Gemma, via a webcam. Meanwhile, the Civil Service career of his wife Julie stagnates and his two twenty-something daughters, Chloe and Lucy, refuse to leave home. Martin's elderly mother appears lost in another world. Martin and Julie's best friends are Duncan Amis, an author, and his wife Sarah who is a television actress. Martin and Julie try new jobs and therapy in order to cope with their life.

== Episodes ==
Title	Airdate	Overview
The Job List	22 February 2007	The advertising company Martin works for gives him a new job, which means he has to work at home. He soon gets bored and frustrated while trying to work his way through a list of things to do given to him by Julie, including dealing with the plumbers, the dog Diggy and the car. After visiting his mother at the nursing home, Martin brings her home, to Julie's annoyance. Lucy announces she is going to Iraq to help someone write a book and Duncan and Sarah come round for dinner.
Sex and Friends	1 March 2007	Duncan goes to see Martin and Julie to say he is having marriage problems, and when he gets home he sees Sarah sleeping with his golfing partner Barry. Duncan then changes the locks, and Sarah comes to stay with Martin and Julie in the spare room, Martin having taken Gran back to the nursing home. Sarah's presence soon causes problems all round, so Julie brings Gran back which means Sarah has to go so Gran can have her room back.
Stress and Drugs	8 March 2007	Martin is getting depressed and very stressed, and Sarah suggests to Julie that he take legal drugs, while Duncan suggests he get a new job. Martin then applies for a job at a Christian PR firm. However, before an important interview he takes one of the drugs which affects his behaviour. Meanwhile, Chloe is learning to drive, with Martin as her instructor, but she fails her test.
Julie's Interviews	15 March 2007	Julie has to prepare for an interview to become Head of Planning, and has to try to impress her boss Laura Swanson (Elizabeth Bennett). However, she does not get the job as she is not qualified enough. Meanwhile, Martin has problems buying tampons and Lucy complains about bank charges.
Health and Gran	22 March 2007	Martin and Julie injure themselves when they get drunk, and the following day they find Gran unconscious. At the hospital, Martin promises God that he will give up drink if Gran survives. The doctor then tells them that Gran had alcohol poisoning, and Martin feels guilty. He then gives up drink and tries to show everyone that he cares about them. However, very soon he leaves Gran at the golf course, and agrees with social services to take her back to the care home, a decision that Gran is very pleased about. Guests starring Martin Trenaman.
Menopause	29 March 2007	Duncan asks Martin to do him a favour, which will help Henry Clegg, a friend of Duncan's, get a knighthood. Meanwhile, Julie is very stressed and down, and thinks it is the menopause, and Martin has to assure that her that he will not leave her for someone younger.

== Theme tune ==
Mcfly's cover of the Queen song "Don't Stop Me Now" accompanies the closing credits, while Queen's original accompanies the opening credits.

Trivia: Georgia Tennant is actually the daughter of Peter Davison (and Sandra Dickinson).
