= William Priestley (wool clothier) =

William Priestley (1779–1860) was a Halifax wool clothier and a local musician, antiquary and literary gentleman. His strong interest in music, especially German, was manifested in his personal library, which housed many unusual items of German choral music; these formed much of the early repertoire of the Halifax Choral Society, which he is credited with founding.

== Portrayal ==
Peter Davison plays him as a depiction in the British historical drama television series, Gentleman Jack.
