= You, Me and Him (2017 film) =

- Directed by: Daisy Aitkens
- Written by: Daisy Aitkens
- Produced by: Georgia Tennant; Phin Glynn; Harriet Glynn
- Starring: David Tennant; Lucy Punch; Faye Marsay; David Warner; Sarah Parish; Nina Sosanya; Gemma Jones; Sally Phillips; Simon Bird; Don Warrington; Ingrid Oliver; Rebecca Gethings; Kayode Ewumi
- Music by: Jack Goldstein
- Release date: 15 December 2017
- Running time: 98 minutes
- Country: United Kingdom
- Language: English

You, Me and Him is a 2017 British romantic comedy film written and directed by Daisy Aitkens. Its early title was Fish Without Bicycles.

The film focuses on the relationships between a lesbian couple, Olivia (Lucy Punch) and Alex (Faye Marsay), and their womanizing neighbour John (David Tennant).

== Cast ==
- Lucy Punch as Olivia
- Faye Marsay as Alex
- David Tennant as John
- Gemma Jones as Sue Miller
- David Warner as Michael Miller
- Sarah Parish as Mrs Jones
- Sally Philips as Amy
- Simon Bird as Ben Miller
- Nina Sosanya as Dr Parks
- Don Warrington as Charles
- Ingrid Oliver as Lily
- Georgia Tennant as Alison
- Sunetra Sarker as Carol
- Rebecca Gethings as Biggles Tilsbury
- Peter Davison as Teacher
- Sandra Dickinson as Jury
- Olive Tennant as Rose
- Wilfred Tennant as Sam

== Plot ==
Set in middle class England, with female lovers Olivia and Alex. 39-year-old career lawyer Olivia feels ready to start a family but Alex, a much younger artist, remains unsure. When Olivia reveals that she has already begun fertility treatment and insemination, the couple have an argument. Alex has an encounter with John and wakes up in his bed. When the two women discover that they are each pregnant, the three people's relationships enter complicated and uncharted territory.
