= Georgia Tennant =

English actress (born 1984)

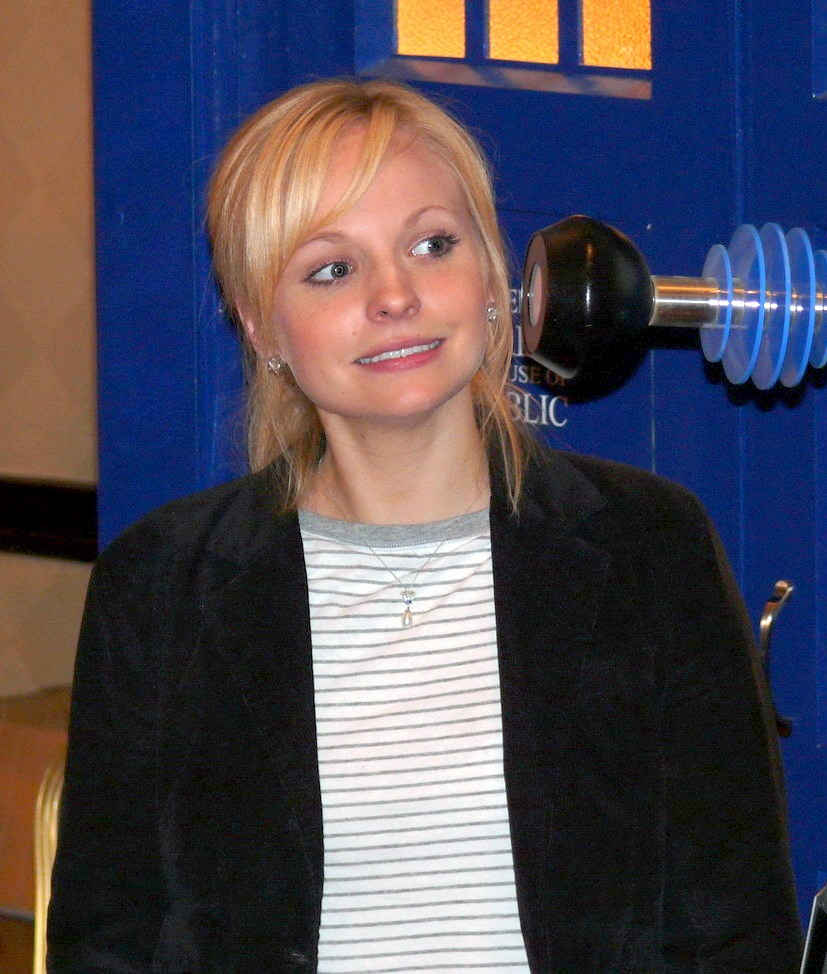
- Tennant at the 2008 San Diego Comic-Con
- Born: Georgia Elizabeth Moffett; 25 December 1984 (age 41); Hammersmith, London, England
- Citizenship: United Kingdom; United States
- Education: St Edward's School, Oxford
- Occupations: Actress; producer
- Years active: 1999–present
- Spouse: David Tennant (m. 2011)
- Children: 5, including Ty
- Parents: Peter Davison (father); Sandra Dickinson (mother)
- Relatives: Harold Searles (grandfather); Sandy McDonald (father-in-law); Elizabeth Morton (stepmother)

Georgia Elizabeth Tennant (née Moffett; born 25 December 1984) is an English actress and producer. She played Detective Inspector Samantha Nixon's daughter Abigail in The Bill, Jenny in the Doctor Who episode "The Doctor's Daughter" and Lady Vivian in the show Merlin.

== Early life ==
Tennant is the daughter of actors Peter Moffett, known by his stage name, Peter Davison, and Sandra Dickinson (née Searles), granddaughter of American psychoanalyst Harold Searles. She has two half brothers from her father's third marriage; she is of Guyanese descent through her paternal grandfather and Finnish descent through her maternal grandmother. She attended St Edward's School in Oxford.

== Career ==
Tennant made her television debut at the age of 15 in Peak Practice (1999), playing Nicki Davey.

In 2002, she rose to prominence playing Abigail Nixon, the troubled teenage daughter of Detective Inspector Samantha Nixon in ITVs The Bill. Tennant appeared in the recurring role for seven years until her character was written out, just before the show's cancellation.

Tennant has appeared in television dramas such as The Second Quest and Like Father Like Son. She played downtrodden Alice Harding in the ITV drama Where the Heart Is in 2004 and 2005, and has performed alongside her father, Peter Davison, in Fear, Stress & Anger and The Last Detective.

In 2007, she made her theatrical debut as Mathilde Verlaine in Total Eclipse at London's Menier Chocolate Factory. In May 2008, Tennant appeared in the BBC series Doctor Who as the Tenth Doctor's artificially-created daughter, Jenny, in the episode "The Doctor's Daughter", with her future husband, David Tennant, playing the Doctor. In August 2008, Tennant starred in series one of BBC Three's spy spin-off Spooks: Code 9 as Kylie Roman.

Tennant voiced the role of Cassie Rice in Doctor Who: Dreamland in 2009, and portrayed Lady Vivian in the "Sweet Dreams" episode of the BBC drama Merlin. She joined the cast of BBC medical drama Casualty as junior doctor Heather Whitefield, but her character was killed off after just two episodes.

In June 2010, she performed in the short play Hens, which ran for four performances at the Riverside Studios and was later broadcast on Sky Arts 2, and played a cameo role in the television drama Thorne: Sleepyhead as the wife of one of the junior detectives. In March 2011, she landed the role of Emma in the BBC Three sitcom White Van Man, which ran for two series before being cancelled. In May 2012, Tennant made her West End debut in the play What the Butler Saw at the Vaudeville Theatre in London. The play received poor reviews and ticket sales, and on 13 July the production announced via its website that the play had been cancelled and would be ending the following week, a month earlier than scheduled.

In November 2013, Tennant appeared in and produced the Doctor Who homage anniversary webcast The Five(ish) Doctors Reboot; as a producer, she was credited under her married name of Georgia Tennant (though her initial acting appearances were credited under Georgia Moffett). It was written and directed by her father, and featured cameo appearances by her husband and her two older children, while she was heavily pregnant with her third; the webcast features a scripted scene of her going into labour.

Tennant produced and starred in a short film opposite her husband, David Tennant, called 96 Ways to Say I Love You, which premiered at the London Independent Film Festival in April 2015. In 2017, she returned to acting with a small role in BBC drama miniseries In the Dark, credited as Georgia Tennant. That same year, she produced a comedy film starring her husband called You, Me and Him. In 2018, the first series of the Big Finish audio drama Jenny: The Doctor's Daughter was released, in which Tennant reprised her role from the 2008 Doctor Who episode "The Doctor's Daughter" as the protagonist. The second series was released in 2021, and the third series followed in 2024. A fourth series has been announced for 2027. From 2019, she produced her husband's podcast series David Tennant Does a Podcast with... In 2020, David Tennant and Michael Sheen starred in the six-part comedy Staged, filmed during the COVID-19 lockdown, with Tennant producing the series and also acting in a supporting role. She reprised her role in the second and third series of the show.

In the 2022 television series The Horne Section, she played the part of Ash. The second series was released in 2025, with Tennant returning to the show. She lent her voice to dog Kika in the British television series Dog Squad.

In 2024, ahead of the release of Rivals, starring her husband, she re-recorded the audiobook of the same title that was released in 1988. In 2025, she narrated the third book in the Rutshire Chronicles, Polo, as well as Asia Mackay's novel A Serial Killer's Guide to Marriage.

== Personal life ==
Tennant began dating Scottish actor David Tennant in 2008, having met on set filming the Doctor Who episode "The Doctor's Daughter". They married in 2011 and have five children, including Ty. The eldest three have acted.

Tennant is a patron of Straight Talking, a charity set up to educate young people about teenage pregnancy.

In 2018, Tennant received a diagnosis of, and was successfully treated for, early stage cervical cancer.

== Filmography ==
=== Film ===
Year	Title	Role	Notes
2015	96 Ways to Say I Love You	Olive	Short film; also producer
2016	The Exit		Short film; producer
2017	You, Me and Him	Alison	Feature film; also producer
2020	Screening	Prime Minister	Short film
2025	The Birds and the Bees		Short film; executive producer

=== Television ===
Year	Title	Role	Notes
1999	Peak Practice	Nicki Davey	4 episodes
2002–2009	The Bill	Abigail Nixon	26 episodes
2004	The Second Quest	Sandra Biggs	Television film
2004	Holby City	Emma Lenton	Episode: "A Good Day to Bury Bad News"
2004–2005	Where the Heart Is	Alice Harding	17 episodes
2005	Like Father Like Son	Morag Tait	2 episodes
2005	Tom Brown's Schooldays	Sally	Television film
2007	Fear, Stress and Anger	Chloe Chadwick	6 episodes
2007	Bonkers	Debbie Hooper	4 episodes
2007	Casualty	Elaine Walker	Episode: "Lost in the Rough"
2007	The Last Detective	Tanya	Episode: "Once Upon a Time on the Westway"
2008	My Family	Penny Bishop	Episode: "Let's Not Be Heisty"
2008	Doctor Who	Jenny	Episode: "The Doctor's Daughter"
2008	Spooks: Code 9	Kylie Roman	All 6 episodes
2009	Agatha Christie's Marple	Lady Frances "Frankie" Derwent	Episode: "Why Didn't They Ask Evans?"
2009	Doctor Who: Dreamland	Cassie Rice (voice)	All 6 episodes
2009	Casualty	Heather Whitefield	2 episodes
2009	Merlin	Lady Vivian	Episode: "Sweet Dreams"
2010	Playhouse Live	Leila	Episode: "Hens"
2010	Thorne: Sleepyhead	Sophie Holland	2 episodes
2011	White Van Man	Emma	13 episodes
2013	The Five(ish) Doctors Reboot	Georgia Moffett	Television film; also producer
2014	Casualty	Briony Whitman	Episode: "Entrenched"
2014	Holby City	Briony Whitman	Episode: "Chaos in Her Wings"
2015	Joan of Arc: God's Warrior	Joan of Arc	Television film
2017	In the Dark	Jenny	All 4 episodes
2020–2022	Staged	herself	20 episodes; also producer
2022	Meet the Richardsons	herself	2 episodes
2022	The Sandman	Laura Lynn (voice)	Episode: "Dream of a Thousand Cats"
2022–2024	Dog Squad	Kika (voice)	12 episodes
2022-2025	The Horne Section	Ash	All 12 episodes
2024	The Way	Millie	1 episode
2027	Bergerac	Laura	

=== Audio ===
Year	Title	Role	Notes
2000	Doctor Who: Red Dawn	Tanya Webster	Big Finish Productions
2008	Doctor Who: Snowglobe 7	Narrator	BBC Audio
2010	Doctor Who: Autonomy	Narrator	BBC Audio
2010	City of Spires	Alice	Big Finish Productions
2013	Bernice Summerfield: New Frontiers	Avril Fenman	Big Finish Productions
2014	Osiris: Osirian Enemy	Jessica	Everybodyelse Productions
2014	Frankenstein	Elizabeth	Big Finish Productions
2014	Doctor Who: Rule of the Eminence	Engineer Tallow	Big Finish Productions
2018	Jenny-The Doctor’s Daughter	Jenny	Big Finish Productions
2019	Doctor Who: The Legacy of Time	Jenny	Big Finish Productions
2021	Jenny-The Doctor’s Daughter – Still Running	Jenny	Big Finish Productions
2022	Doctor Who: The Eighth of March - Protectors of Time	Jenny	Big Finish Productions
2023	Doctor Who: Once and Future: The Artist at the End of Time	Jenny	Big Finish Productions
2023-25	Whatever Happened to Baby Jane Austen	Lucy (from series 2)	BBC Radio 4
2024	Jenny - The Doctor’s Daughter - Saving Time	Jenny	Big Finish Productions
2024	Rivals	Narrator	Audible
2025	A Serial Killer’s Guide to Marriage	Hazel	Audible
2025	Polo	Narrator	Audible
2026	Not Like the Other Parents	Hazel	Audible
2026	Riders	Narrator	Audible
2027	Jenny - The Doctor‘s Daughter - Zero Chill	Jenny	Big Finish Productions

== Stage ==
Year	Title	Role	Notes
2007	Total Eclipse	Mathilde Verlaine	Menier Chocolate Factory
2010	Hens	Leila	Riverside Studios
2012	What the Butler Saw	Geraldine Barclay	The Vaudeville Theatre
