= Danny King (author) =

British novelist and screenwriter (born 1969)

- Born: Daniel Michael King; March 5, 1969 (age 57); Slough, Berkshire, England
- Education: Farnborough College of Technology; London College of Printing
- Occupations: Novelist, screenwriter
- Spouse: Jeannette Crockett (m. 2007)
- Children: 4
- Writing career
- Years active: 1993–present
- Notable work: Wild Bill
- Notable awards: Amazon.co.uk Bursary Award – Best First Novel (2002); Writers' Guild of Great Britain Award – Best First Feature Film (2012); Wells Festival of Literature – Children's Story Competition (2016)

Daniel Michael King (born 5 March 1969) is a British novelist and screenwriter. He is the author of more than a dozen books and the writer of the BAFTA-nominated film Wild Bill.

== Early life and education ==
Danny King was born in Slough, Buckinghamshire (now Berkshire), the second son of Michael and Dorothy King. He lived on the Britwell Estate until 1979, when his family moved to Yateley, Hampshire. He attended Yateley School but failed to gain any qualifications before leaving at the age of 16. He stacked shelves for a short stint in the Yateley branch of Somerfield (then Gateway), before working on various building sites as a hod carrier.

In 1991 he took an Access course at Farnborough College of Technology, which helped him land a place at The London College of Printing studying journalism. Between 1993 and 2002 he worked on various magazine titles, eventually becoming Editor of the Paul Raymond Publications title Mayfair. He now writes full-time.

A 2003 review in The Times noted that King had previously worked as a hod carrier, a postman, and later as the editor of a pornographic magazine.

== Books ==
- The Burglar Diaries – published by Serpent's Tail (2001)
- The Bank Robber Diaries – published by Serpent's Tail (2002)
- The Hitman Diaries – published by Serpent's Tail (2003)
  - Mordsjob (German translation) – published by Luzifer-Verlag (2018)
- The Pornographer Diaries – published by Serpent's Tail (2004)
- Milo's Marauders – published by Serpent's Tail (2005)
- Milo's Run – published by Serpent's Tail (2006)
- School for Scumbags – published by Serpent's Tail (2007)
- Blue Collar – published by Serpent's Tail (2009)
- More Burglar Diaries – published by Byker Books and AST (Russia) (2009)
- The Henchmen's Book Club – Lulu.com (2011)
- The Monster Man of Horror House – self-published (2011)
  - Das Haus der Monster (German translation) – published by Luzifer-Verlag (2017)
- The No.1 Zombie Detective Agency – self-published (2012)
  - The No.1 Zombie Detective Agency – published by Icarus Publishing (2023)
- Infidelity for Beginners – published by Byker Books (2013)
- Eat Local – published by Wild Wolf Publishing (2017)
  - Eat Local(s) – Rate, wer zum Essen kommt (German translation) – published by Luzifer-Verlag (2018)
- Amy X rennt allen davon (German translation) – published by Piper-Verlag (2019)
  - Amy X and The Great Race – self-published (2021)
- Amy X und die Schule für perfekte Prinzessinnen (German translation) – published by Piper ebooks (2020)
  - Amy X and The Prim & Proper Princess School – self-published (2021)
- The Monster Man of Horror House Returns – self-published (2020)
  - Das Haus der Monster – Die Monster sind zurück (German translation) – published by Luzifer-Verlag (2020)
- Curse of the Monster Man of Horror House – self-published (2020)
- Amy X and The Terrible Typhoon – self-published (2021)
- The Ugly Sisters – published by Icarus Publishing (2023)
- Cancelled: The Shape of Things to Come – self-published (2024)

== Film and television ==
- 2007 Thieves Like Us, six part sitcom adapted from his first book, The Burglar Diaries, with the BBC
- 2009 The Hitman Diaries, short film adapted from his book of the same name, directed by Mark Abraham
- 2011 Wild Bill, feature film co-written with Dexter Fletcher
- 2017 Eat Locals, feature film directed by Jason Flemyng
- 2017 Run Run As Fast As You Can, short film directed by Katie Smith
- 2018 Little Monsters, short film directed by Simon Harris
- 2019 Romantic, short film adapted from The Hitman Diaries, directed by Konstantin Tupitsyn (Russia)
- 2019 Seven Sharp, short film directed by Roque Cameselle

== Stage ==
- The Pornographer Diaries, adapted from his book of the same name. It was produced by Have a Word Productions (Kate McCarthy) and played at the C venues during the 2007 Edinburgh Festival from 1 to 27 August, starring Gary Beadle, Jessica Harris (actress) and David Swire.
- The Hitman Diaries, translated (Killlera Dienasgrāmata) and adapted for the stage by J. J. Jillinger and performed by the Liepāja Teatris (Theatre) Company in Latvia from 2007 to 2011. Literary Director Edite Tisheizere.

== Awards ==
- 2002 Amazon.co.uk Bursary Award – Best First Novel – The Burglar Diaries
- 2012 Writers' Guild of Great Britain Award – Best First Feature Film – Wild Bill
- 2016 Wells Festival of Literature – Children's Story Competition – Amy X and the Great Race

Nominations

- 2010 Melissa Nathan Award for Comedy Romance – Best comedy romance novel – Blue Collar
- 2013 BAFTA Film Awards – Outstanding Debut by a British Writer, Director or Producer – Wild Bill
- 2017 Wells Festival of Literature – Children's Story Competition – Amy X and the Prim and Proper Princess School
- 2017 Vincent Preis Horror Award – Best International Work (5th) – Das Haus Der Monster
- 2025 Prometheus Award – Best Novel (Finalist) – Cancelled: The Shape of Things to Come

== Personal life ==
He married Jeannette Crockett in March 2007 and they live in Bournemouth, Dorset with their four children.
