= Wooden Heart (novel) =

2007 novel by Martin Day

- Author: Martin Day
- Series: Doctor Who book: New Series Adventures
- Release number: 15
- Subject: Featuring: Tenth Doctor; Martha Jones
- Set in: Period between "Evolution of the Daleks" and "Utopia"
- Publisher: BBC Books
- Publication date: 19 April 2007
- ISBN: 1-84607-226-3
- Preceded by: The Last Dodo
- Followed by: Forever Autumn

Wooden Heart is a BBC Books original novel written by Martin Day and based on the long-running science fiction television series Doctor Who. It features the Tenth Doctor and Martha Jones.

== Synopsis ==
Martha and the Doctor discover an apparently deserted starship, and soon, a village appears in the middle of the craft. As they try to work out the mystery of the village, and its connection to the ship, they find out that the village has other problems - fog and monsters surround them at every turn, and their children have been going missing.

== Plot ==
The Doctor and Martha arrive on the Castor, an abandoned prison ship floating in space. Whilst exploring they find a fully populated village and forest, whose inhabitants appear to be unaware of the spaceship outside, and whose children are mysteriously disappearing. Later, The Doctor and Martha find a creature from another dimension, who, because of its telepathic powers, was used to remove the evil from prisoners in the Castor. To keep itself sane, it expelled the evil, creating a separate being which killed the crew. The telepathic creature then created the forest and village in an attempt to balance itself with goodness, but, due to low power supplies, it is having to remove small parts of the 'program', such as children, to conserve power. The Doctor offers to pilot the ship closer to a sun to give the creature more power to run the program, and a woman from the village absorbs the evil into her body, before exiling herself, so she can learn to control it. The Doctor and Martha then leave the creature to maintain the forest world.

== Production ==
- According to an interview in Doctor Who Magazine, the working title was Children of the Fog.

== Audiobook ==
An abridged audiobook was released in July 2007 by BBC Audiobooks and was read by Adjoa Andoh, who plays Francine Jones in the TV series.

== See also ==
- Whoniverse
