= The Last Dodo (disambiguation) =

The Last Dodo is a 2007 novel by Jacqueline Rayner.

The Last Dodo may also refer to:

- The Last Dodo, a 1967 novel by "Richard Boyde" (pseud. Richard Chopping)
- The Last Dodo character in the Warner Brothers cartoon Porky in Wackyland
