= Eat Locals =

2017 vampire film directed by Jason Flemyng

- Poster
- Directed by: Jason Flemyng
- Written by: Danny King
- Produced by: Jason Flemyng; Neil Jones; Rod Smith; Jonathan Sothcott
- Starring: Charlie Cox; Mackenzie Crook; Tony Curran; Vincent Regan; Freema Agyeman; Eve Myles
- Cinematography: Chas Bain
- Edited by: Alex Fenn
- Music by: James Seymour Brett
- Production company: Evolution Pictures
- Release date: September 1, 2017
- Running time: 94 minutes
- Country: United Kingdom
- Language: English
- Box office: $6,560

Eat Locals is a 2017 vampire film directed by Jason Flemyng, in his directorial debut. It is a British production and was filmed on location in Hertfordshire. A group of vampire lords gather for a summit to discuss quotas, but are attacked by special forces soldiers. The film received generally negative reviews.

== Plot ==
A group of vampire lords — Henry, The Duke, Peter Boniface, Thomas, Angel, Chen and Alice — gather at a small rural farmhouse for a summit which they have every 50 years to discuss quotas. Thomas is executed for going over quota and for taking children. Vanessa arrives late and has brought Sebastian as her guest and proposes him as a replacement, but Peter objects. Sebastian tries to escape and is easily caught. Rather than kill him immediately, they decide to keep him alive as food and secure him in the basement along with Mr. and Mrs. Thatcher who own the farmhouse.

Meanwhile, soldiers gather nearby. Surprised to have found more than one "cold body", they delay their assault but Larousse says they have enough to take down two and urges then to strike immediately. The strike team is overwhelmed and only The Duke is killed. The vampires unpack machine guns and exchange fire with the remaining soldiers outside. Larousse, a religious man, wants the vampires wiped out entirely. Colonel Bingham is motivated by profit, as he is promised a large sum if he brings a vampire to a cosmetics company. He wants to take one prisoner for scientific research. The vampires form a plan to head out directly, needing just one of them to break through and circle back around to kill the soldiers. The breakout is chaotic; Chen and Alice are killed, and Vanessa is captured. Peter, Angel and Henry survive and regroup at the house. Sebastian suggests they have nothing to lose by trying to talk and that maybe like the film Zulu they might agree to end the battle and leave. Larousse gets too close to Vanessa and she bites him. Henry goes with a hooded hostage to negotiate but Bingham decides to press his advantage and shoots the hostage. Vanessa, Henry and Larousse are hung out on frames outside. The sunlight will kill them and the cosmetics company will conduct tests on their skin.

Meanwhile Sebastian emerges from the farmhouse freezer. The hostage was in fact Peter disguised and covered with hot water bottles to make him seem like a warm body. Peter begins picking off the soldiers. Tired of it all and seeing no way out, Vanessa decides to end her own life. Sebastian and Private Bower pass each other in the forest and Sebastian suggests they continue on and pretend it didn't happen. Bower encounters Mr. Thatcher and suggests they move along. Thatcher warns there is something terrible in the forest, him, and then attacks with a knife. Angel see what has happened and kills Thatcher. Sebastian stumbles upon the army trucks and starts the engine but is interrupted by Angel. He wants to live and she needs a driver (as dawn is approaching) and so they agree to work together.

Peter attacks Bingham and agrees to free Henry only if he can have the Duke's territory and therefore his quota. After releasing Henry (who only fed on animals and not humans); he breaks his 600 year old vow and attacks Bingham.

Henry, Peter and Angel escape in the army truck with Sebastian driving. Peter drops his earlier objection and Sebastian is invited to become a vampire, but he says he will have to think about it as they drive off to anywhere else. As dawn breaks, three representatives from the cosmetics company find a vampire Bingham on the rack and take samples before he burns up. They use the samples to make their next rejuvenating cosmetics product.

== Cast ==
- Freema Agyeman as Angel
- Eve Myles as Vanessa
- Adrian Bower as Private Bower
- Roman Clark as Mick
- Billy Cook as Sebastian Crockett
- Charlie Cox as Henry
- Mackenzie Crook as Larousse
- Annette Crosbie as Alice
- Tony Curran as Peter Boniface
- Blain Fairman as Station Master
- Dexter Fletcher as Mr. Thatcher
- Ruth Jones as Mrs. Thatcher
- Ben Starr as Private Crown
- Rhys Parry Jones as Private Jones
- Johnny Palmiero as 18
- Robert Portal as Colonel Bingham
- Vincent Regan as The Duke
- Jordan Long as Thomas

== Production ==
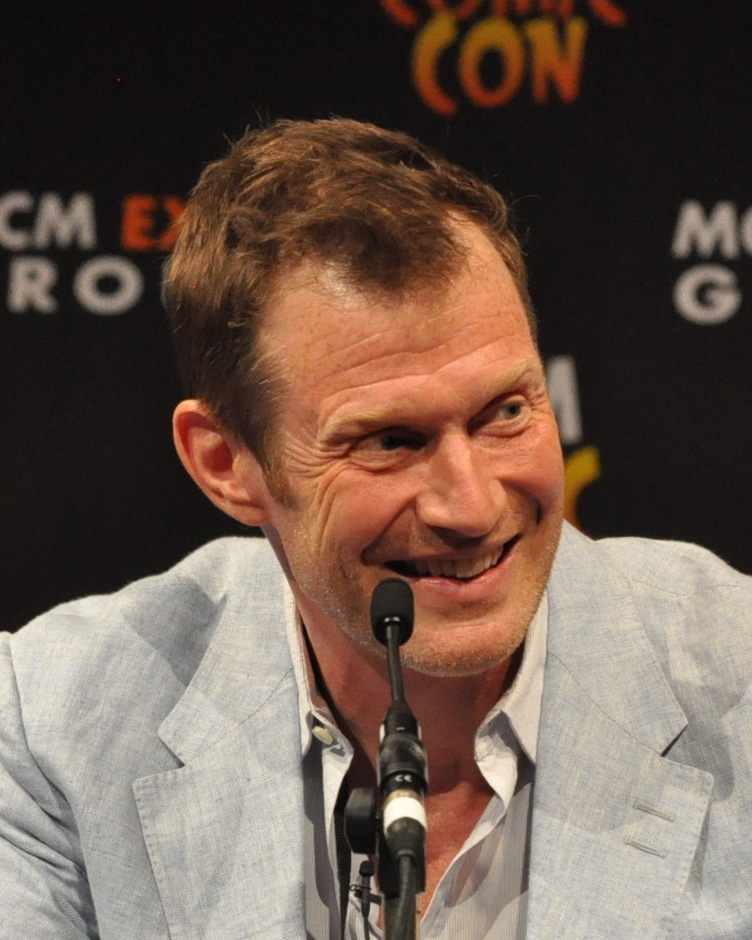
Director Jason Flemyng.

Danny King first developed the project about ten years earlier with the title "Reign Of Blood". The original plan was for Dexter Fletcher to direct and Jason Flemyng to produce. Dexter decided to direct Wild Bill instead, and Flemyng went to work on X-Men First Class. Flemyng returned and looked for other directors but ultimately decided to direct it himself.

The film was shot in Hertfordshire, over four weeks on a twenty day schedule.

Jason Statham spent two days working as a second unit director. Statham was credited as a Fight Consultant. Catering was provided by chefs working for Jamie Oliver.

== Reception ==
On Rotten Tomatoes, the film has an approval rating of 21% based on reviews from 14 critics.

Leslie Felperin of The Guardian gave it 2 out of 5 stars, calling it "A larky, cheerfully trashy vampire romp" and "it has the wisdom not to take itself seriously in the slightest, and there are moments when it rustles up a few properly amusing gags and well-turned one-liners" but was disappointed it wasn't funnier. Stephen Dalton of The Hollywood Reporter called it "A low-budget British vampire comedy with more bark than bite, Eat Locals feels like a school reunion project for survivors of Guy Ritchie's early gangster films." Jamie Graham of Total Film gave it 2 out of 5 and wrote: "Neil Marshall's Dog Soldiers did much the same thing with far more wit, energy and innovation."

Anton Bitel of SciFiNow gave it a positive review, saying it "combines the tropes of vampire films with the Little England satire of Royston Vasey to show the accidental centrality of small-town British parochialism to a global economic scene where religious and national interests are trumped by corporate ones." Charlie Oughton of Starburst magazine wrote: "Parallels with everything from Shaun of the Dead to What We Do in the Shadows go down a treat. There's even a nice little bit of social class dialogue bubbling under the surface that results in a final and very wry political money shot."
