= Sick building =

Sick building can refer to:

- Sick building syndrome
- Sick Building, a 2007 Dr. Who novel
