= Wetworld =

2007 novel by Mark Michalowski

- Author: Mark Michalowski
- Series: Doctor Who book: New Series Adventures
- Release number: 18
- Subject: Featuring: Tenth Doctor; Martha Jones
- Set in: Period between "The Family of Blood" and "Utopia"
- Publisher: BBC Books
- Publication date: 6 September 2007
- ISBN: 1-84607-271-9
- Preceded by: Sick Building
- Followed by: Wishing Well

Wetworld is a BBC Books original novel written by Mark Michalowski and based on the long-running science fiction television series Doctor Who. It features the Tenth Doctor and Martha Jones.

== Audiobook ==
An abridged audiobook was released in March 2008. It is read by Freema Agyeman, who plays Martha Jones.

== See also ==
- Whoniverse
