= Northampton General Hospital =

- Northampton General Hospital NHS Trust
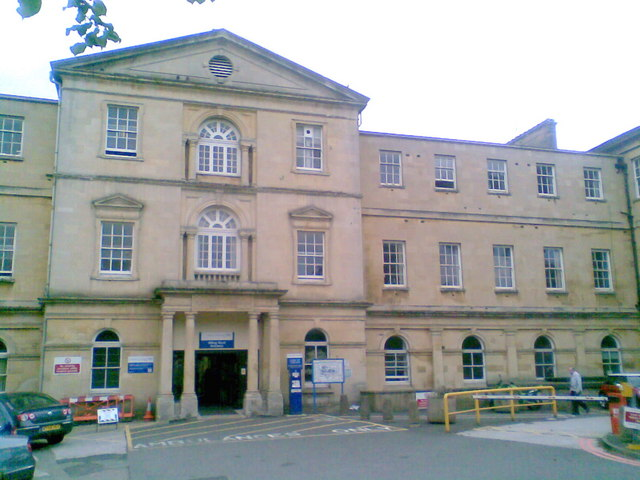
- Northampton General Hospital

- Shown in Northamptonshire

Geography
- Location: Northampton, Northamptonshire, England, United Kingdom
- Coordinates: 52.2360°N 0.8813°W

Organisation
- Care system: Public NHS
- Type: District General
- Affiliated university: University Hospitals of Northamptonshire

Services
- Emergency department: Yes Accident & Emergency
- Beds: 700

History
- Founded: 1744

Links
- Website: www.northamptongeneral.nhs.uk
- Lists: Hospitals in England
- Other links: UHL photos

Northampton General Hospital is a district general hospital in Northampton, Northamptonshire, England. It is managed by the Northampton General Hospital NHS Trust.

== History ==
The hospital was established in a townhouse on George Row in 1744. After a fund-raising campaign led by Dr William Kerr, a purpose-built hospital designed by Mr A Saxton was built at Northampton Fields and opened in 1793.

In October 2012, the Macmillan Haematology Unit, a multimillion-pound cancer facility, was opened by the Countess of Halifax, President of Macmillan Cancer Support.

== Performance ==
In October 2013, as a result of the Keogh Review the trust was put into the highest risk category by the Care Quality Commission (CQC).

In March 2014, the CQC published its report following an inspection of the trust. As well as identifying areas for improvement there were a number of positive findings. The trust was judged as good across all services for 'caring' and inspectors found that, in the main, the safety and effectiveness of services had been maintained, despite the overriding urgent care pressures. In October 2019, the CQC published a report rating the hospital as "requires improvement" overall, with some areas "good". In February 2023, the CQC published another inspection report that rated the hospital the same as previously.

== In the news ==
Two series of BBC Three's Bizarre ER were filmed at the hospital in autumn 2009.

An elderly man died in March 2018 while waiting to be seen by a consultant at the hospital's accident and emergency department: overcrowding at the department was blamed.

== Notable staff ==
- Marion Jane Neepe (1859–1947), matron from 1892 to 1904. Neepe trained at The London Hospital, under Eva Luckes between 1881 and 1883.

== Transport links ==
Northampton has several bus stations outside, and it is served by buses operated by Stagecoach Midlands. The VH1 is operated by the Cogenhoe parish council.

== See also ==
- Kettering General Hospital
- List of hospitals in England
- List of NHS trusts
