= Thieves Like Us (TV series) =

British sitcom (BBC Three, 2007)

- Created by: BBC
- Directed by: Ben Kellett
- Starring: Tom Brooke; Fraser Ayres; Jessica Harris
- Country of origin: United Kingdom
- Original language: English
- No. of series: 1
- No. of episodes: 6

Production
- Running time: 30 mins

Original release
- Network: BBC Three
- Release: 22 January – 26 February 2007

Thieves Like Us is a six-part BBC Three sitcom which was first broadcast in 2007, based on the 2001 book The Burglar Diaries.

It follows the lives of Bex and Ollie, a pair of burglars who make their living by burgling factories, warehouses, offices and shops, and take work wherever they can find it.

It is written by The Burglar Diaries' author, Danny King; each episode lasts around 25 minutes.

== Cast ==
Actor	Character
Tom Brooke	Bex
Fraser Ayres	Ollie
Jessica Harris	Mel
Chereen Buckley	Belinda
Darren Tighe	Norris
David Bradley	Electric
Gary Beadle	DS Haynes
Andrew Buckley	Roland
Corey J Smith	Wayne

== Episode guide ==
1. The Warehouse Job
First aired: 22 January 2007
Bex and Ollie have a warehouse burglary all set up for an eager client, but Bex's angry girlfriend Mel puts the entire enterprise in jeopardy.

2. The Alarm Job
First aired: 29 January 2007
When Mel is kept awake by a neighbour's burglar alarm going off, she asks Bex to go over and fix the problem.

3. The Teapot Job
First aired: 2/5/2007
When Bex and Ollie's fence is himself the victim of a burglary, he asks them to find the thieves and recover the valuable antique teapot that was stolen.

4. The Jackets Job
First aired: 2/12/2007
Detective Haynes finally thinks he has enough evidence to arrest Bex and Ollie. Can they rely on a clever lawyer to get them free?

5. The Footballer Job
First aired: 19 February 2007
When a bad-boy footballer tosses Mel's young cousin's bicycle into the river, she asks Bex and Ollie to persuade him to make an apology.

6. The Office Job
First aired: 26 February 2007
Bex and Ollie have interviews for real jobs, albeit in telemarketing, but Ollie's girlfriend Mel is suspicious of their motives, especially when she discovers that the police are looking for the pair.
