= Sick Building =

2007 novel by Paul Magrs

- Author: Paul Magrs
- Series: Doctor Who book: New Series Adventures
- Release number: 17
- Subject: Featuring: Tenth Doctor; Martha Jones
- Set in: Period between "The Family of Blood" and "Utopia"
- Publisher: BBC Books
- Publication date: 6 September 2007
- ISBN: 1-84607-269-7
- Preceded by: Forever Autumn
- Followed by: Wetworld

Sick Building is a BBC Books original novel written by Paul Magrs and based on the long-running science fiction television series Doctor Who. It features the Tenth Doctor and Martha Jones. This book had the working title The Wicked Bungalow before changing to Sick Building, at the request of Russell T Davies.

Sick Building was shortlisted for the 2008–2009 Doncaster Book Award.

== Plot summary ==
The TARDIS arrives on Tiermann's World. Professor Tiermann and his family live alone here in a futuristic, fully automated Dreamhome, protected by a supposedly impenetrable force shield. An enormous alien creature called the Voracious Craw is heading towards their home with the intent to devour everything. But the Craw is not the only enemy - outside sabre-toothed tigers roam a frozen landscape, and the Dreamhouse itself turns against its occupants.

== Reception ==
Sick Building won Best Book in the 2007 Jade Pagoda Awards.

== Audiobook ==
An abridged Audiobook version was released in March 2008 by BBC Audiobooks and read by Will Thorp, who played Toby Zed in the TV series two-part story, "The Impossible Planet"/"The Satan Pit".

== See also ==
- Whoniverse
