= Rikki Beadle-Blair =

British actor and director (born 1961)

Rikki Beadle-Blair MBE
- Beadle-Blair in 2007
- Born: 25 July 1961 (age 64); Camberwell, London, England
- Occupations: Actor, film director, writer
- Parent: Monica Beadle
- Relatives: Gary Beadle (brother)

Richard Barrington "Rikki" Beadle-Blair MBE (born 25 July 1961) is a British actor, director, and playwright. He is the artistic director of multi-media production company Team Angelica.

== Early life ==
Beadle-Blair was born in Camberwell and raised in Bermondsey, both in south London, England, by a single mother, Monica. Rikki was brought up with a brother, Gary Beadle (also an actor, of EastEnders fame), and a sister. He attended Lois Acton's Experimental Bermondsey Lampost Free School and, later, Old Vic Youth Theatre.

== Career ==
Beadle-Blair wrote the screenplay for the 1995 feature film Stonewall (dir. Nigel Finch, 1995). He adapted his own screenplay of Stonewall for the stage and his production company Team Angelica, which he took to the 2007 Edinburgh Festival. He also directed, produced, designed both sets and costumes, and choreographed on the show. The play was nominated for "Best Ensemble" at the Stage Awards for Acting Excellence.

Beadle-Blair wrote and created the Channel 4 miniseries Metrosexuality, which aired in 2001. He also portrayed one of the central characters in the show.

In Autumn 2007, FIT, a play for young people commissioned by the Manchester-based arts organisation queerupnorth and the gay equality organisation Stonewall, went on tour around the UK. The play was developed to help tackle homophobic bullying in Britain's schools. Beadle-Blair subsequently adapted it into a film (2010).

Beadle-Blair was appointed Member of the Order of the British Empire (MBE) in the 2016 Birthday Honours for services to drama.

== Selected plays ==
- Kick-Off – January 2009, Riverside Studios
- Fit (Autumn 2008) adapted for film in 2010
- Home – Tristan Bates Theatre (June 2008)
- Touch – Tristan Bates Theatre (June 2008)
- Screwface – Tristan Bates Theatre (June 2008).
- Familyman – Theatre Royal Stratford East (May 2008, directed by Dawn Reid). Text published by Oberon Books.
- FIT (2007) – National Tour – adapted for film
- Stonewall (2006/7) – stage adaptation of the BBC film.
- Taken In (2005) – Set in a halfway house for homeless youths.
- Bashment (2005) – explores the controversy around dancehall reggae music and the consequences of homophobic lyrics – Theatre Royal Stratford East. Text published by Oberon Books.
- Totally Practically Naked in My Room on a Wednesday Night (2005) – a night in the life of 17-year-old Dylan, desperate to lose his virginity.
- South London Passion Plays trilogy (Gutted, Laters and Sweet) (2004) – Tristan Bates Theatre
- Captivated (1997) – the story of a gay black man imprisoned for murder. Shane corresponds with an Asian pen pal who writes him as an act of charity. Shane's self-hatred turns into a soul-searching journey from cockiness to agonised self-reflection, and finally ultimate gratitude for his unseen friend.
- Ask and Tell – homosexuality and the Army.
- twothousandandSex – an ensemble play about sex and sexuality featuring 35 actors – at the Drill Hall Theatre.

Four one-hour ensemble plays

- Exposures
- Street Art
- The Grope Box
- Fucking Charlie
- Below the Radar – a straight guy/gay guy pair of roommates and their sexual misadventures in New Orleans.
- Human – two terminally ill cancer patients get together for a final riotous love affair.
- Prettyboy – described as a 'Dogma Style Musical" at the Oval House Theatre.
- Gunplay (he did not direct)
- Wild at Heart, Riverside Studios (1988)

== Radio/Audio ==
Roots of Homophobia (writer/presenter, Radio 4, 2001) an exploration of Jamaican homophobia. It won a 2002 Sony Best Feature Award.

Whoopsie (writer; directed by Turan Ali for Bona Broadcasting/Radio 4, 2021) – gay comedy-drama, 28 mins.

Scooters, Shooters & Shottas: a Curious Tale (director, written by John R Gordon, a Team Angelica/The Art Machine co-production, 2022) – a 40-minute podcast drama of raucous Black queer lives in "the endz" of South London.

== Team Angelica ==
In 2011, with long-term creative partner John R. Gordon, Beadle-Blair founded Team Angelica Publishing, a queer-of-colour-centric press. Their first book was Beadle-Blair's inspirational What I Learned Today. They have since published gay Somali Diriye Osman's groundbreaking short-story collection, Fairytales For Lost Children, which won the Polari prize in 2014, and Gordon's Drapetomania, favourably reviewed in the Financial Times, which won the Ferro-Grumley Award for Best LGBTQ Fiction in 2019. Most recently they published Larry Duplechan's memoir through his love of film, Movies That Made Me Gay (2024).

== Publications ==
- Bashment (playtext), Oberon Books, 2005, ISBN 978-1840025828
- Family Man (playtext), Oberon Books, 2008, ISBN 978-1840028584
- Fit (playtext), Oberon Books, 2010, ISBN 978-1849430807
- What I Learned Today (inspirational), Team Angelica Publishing, 2011, ISBN 978-0956971906
- Shalom, Baby (playtext), Oberon Books, 2011, ISBN 978-1849432139
- Reasons to Live (inspirational), Team Angelica Publishing, 2012, ISBN 978-0956971920
- Gutted (playtext), Oberon, 2013, ISBN 978-1783190164
- Black & Gay in the UK (co-editor), Team Angelica Publishing, 2014, ISBN 978-0956971968
- More Than (co-editor), Team Angelica Publishing, 2016 ISBN 978-0956971999
- Summer in London (playtext), Team Angelica Publishing, 2017, ISBN 978-0995516229
- Sista! (co-editor), Team Angelica Publishing, 2018, ISBN 978-0995516243
- Mother Country: Real Stories of the Windrush Children (anthology: contributor), Headline, 2019, ISBN 978-1472261908
- Oberon Book of Modern Monologues for Women: Teens to Thirties (anthology: contributor), Oberon, 2022, ISBN 978-1350321847
- Black British Queer Plays and Practitioners: An Anthology of Afriquia Theatre (anthology: contributor), Methuen, 2022, ISBN 978-1350234567

== See also ==
- London Lesbian and Gay Film Festival

== External links and sources ==
- Rikki Beadle-Blair at IMDb
