= Mark Michalowski =

British writer (born 1963)

Mark Michalowski (born 1963 in Chesterfield) is an author best known for his work writing spin-offs based on the BBC Television series Doctor Who. He lives and works in Leeds. He is the former editor of Shout!, "Yorkshire's lesbian, gay, bisexual and transgender paper".

== Work ==
Michalowski's first published work was a short story in the Big Finish Productions' collection Professor Bernice Summerfield and the Dead Men's Diaries (Big Finish, September 2000), which was the result of a chance meeting with producer Gary Russell whilst both were visiting BBC Manchester. He continued writing short stories for Big Finish's Short Trips range, and also for a variety of charity fanzines, before his first novel, Relative Dementias (BBC Books, 2003) was published as part of the BBC Books Past Doctor Adventures. This was widely well-received, and led to a further novel being published by the BBC, this time an Eighth Doctor Adventure called Halflife (BBC Books, 2004).

His next published novel was the Big Finish Bernice Summerfield novel The Tree of Life (Big Finish, 2005), followed by the story "Let There Be Stars" in the Bernice Summerfield anthology Collected Works (Big Finish, 2005) and other stories for collections by the same company.

A further Doctor Who novel was published in September 2007, Wetworld featuring the 10th Doctor and Martha, and a second NSA released in September 2008, Shining Darkness featuring the 10th Doctor and Donna.

Since then he has contributed a story to the audio play Forty Five (Big Finish, 2009) to help celebrate the 45th anniversary of Doctor Who, as well as written the Iris Wildthyme audio The Sound of Fear (Big Finish, 2009).

He has also contributed graphic design work to Obverse Books, designing the cover for their short story collection, Iris Wildthyme and the Celestial Omnibus, for which company he also contributed a story in The Panda Book of Horror.

A Being Human novel, Chasers, was released in 2010, as was a short story for the Bernice Summerfield collection Secret Histories.

He wrote The Ghosts of Mercury, book #3 in the first series of Space: 1889 & Beyond, as well as short stories for Obverse Books for whom he also designed the cover to Iris Wildthyme and the Celestial Omnibus.
