= Being Human novels =

Fantasy novel series by Simon Guerrier, Mark Michalowski and James Goss

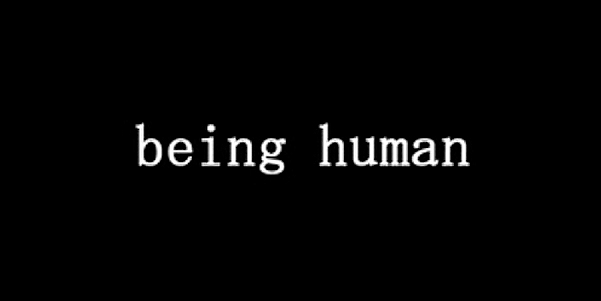
- 1. Being Human - The Road (Simon Guerrier); 2. Being Human - Chasers (Mark Michalowski); 3. Being Human - Bad Blood (James Goss)
- Author: Simon Guerrier, Mark Michalowski and James Goss
- Country: United Kingdom
- Language: English
- Genre: Fantasy, mystery, gothic fiction, vampire fiction, werewolf fiction, supernatural fiction, ghost story
- Publisher: BBC Books
- Published: 4 February 2010
- No. of books: 3

The Being Human novels are a series of three fantasy novels written by Simon Guerrier, Mark Michalowski and James Goss. The novels are based on the British television series Being Human, created by Toby Whithouse.

== General information ==
There are three novels which deal with the characters of the British Being Human series. The first novel is The Road written by Simon Guerrier. The second novel Chasers is written by Mark Michalowski and the final novel Bad Blood is written by James Goss. All three authors have also written novels for the British television series Doctor Who.

Since the story line goes on throughout all three books the books should be read in the right order, starting with the Road, followed by Chasers and finishing with Bad Blood. The Being Human novels follow the story line of the second series of Being Human. They take place between episode 2x02 and episode 2x03. Annie is invisible and has left the pub. Nina has left George and the vampires of Bristol are without a leader, since Herrick has gone. There are a few characters from the second series, which are mentioned, like Lucy Jaggat. The daughter of the novel character Dr. Declan McGough was murdered by a vampire, during the same time that the wife and daughter of the television character Kemp was murdered. Dr. Declan Mc Gough made contact with a religious organization after this which could be Kemp's CenSSA Organisation.

The books were all published on 4 February 2010. Two years later, in 2012, three audio books were released on mp3. The audio books were read by Lenora Crichlow, Russell Tovey and Lucy Gaskell. Lenora Crichlow plays the main character Annie Sawyer in the television series. Russell Tovey portrays the main character George Sands in the television series. Lucy Gaskell is also known to fans of the television series. She plays the recurring character Sam Danson. In April 2013 the audio book The Road was released on audio CD.

== Plot ==
The vampire Mitchell, the werewolf George and the ghost Annie are flatmates. Together they try to live a human life, and control their instincts. Mitchell wants to stop drinking blood, George tries to live a life that isn't affected by the werewolf curse and Annie likes to be with someone that can understand her and talk to her. This isn't as easy as it seems, as their supernatural part always finds a way to show itself. So they always need to support each other in living their lives, living with the guilt that some actions are causing and dealing with the "ghosts" from their past.

=== The Road ===
Annie is being threatened by the men with the sticks and ropes. These are demons who want to force Annie to go to the other side, to purgatory. When Annie hears a noise in the living room, while she is alone at home, she thinks that the men with the sticks and ropes have finally found her. But when she goes to the living room a door appears and the ghost Gemma enters the living room through the door. Since Gemma needs a place to stay Mitchell and George offer her to stay at the house. Annie doesn't like this idea, however Gemma seems to have nowhere to go, so Annie can't say no. Annie feels like her power is sucked away whenever she is around Gemma. Furthermore, Annie sees that Gemma is scared about something. Annie is sure that Gemma is scared of the men with the sticks and ropes who want Annie as well. Annie thinks that the men might go after Gemma and then might take Annie as well. This makes Annie even more scared. She also realizes that Gemma doesn't tell Annie all about herself. Meanwhile, George and Mitchell have problems with the new administrator at the St. Judes Hospital, Dr. Declan McGough. Since Dr. Declan McGough is working at the hospital, the members there are scared to get sacked. Dr. Declan McGough controls how they are working and tells the employees to asperse each other at him if something is wrong. Mitchell wants to find out whether he is a human or another supernatural being.

=== Chasers ===
The lesbian couple Kaz and Gail want to have baby. They ask George to be the father. At first George is shocked, but then he likes the idea. However he needs to find out if the baby will suffer from the same curse as him and will become a werewolf or not. Meanwhile, Mitchell meets the patient Leo Willis at the hospital. Leo tells Mitchell that he has cancer and since Leo is pretty much interested in the 80s, Mitchell and Leo share something in common. They start spending a lot of time together.

=== Bad Blood ===
Annie's old friend Denise O'Halloran suddenly appears in front of Annie's door. She sees that Annie isn't leaving the house a lot and wants to change that. So Annie and Denise start going out. They even want to organize a big event, a Bingo night. Even though everything is very well planned, Mitchell and George have a feeling that something might go horribly wrong and they also wonder why their boss Dr. Declan McGough appears at the party.

== Characters ==
=== Main characters ===
Name	The Road	Chasers	Bad Blood
Annie Sawyer	Main		
George Sands	Main		
John Mitchell	Main		
Gemma Romain	Main		
Kaz	Guest	Main	
Gail	Guest	Main	
Dr. Declan McGough	Guest		Main
Denise O'Halloran			Main

- Annie Sawyer is a ghost. She died in 2007, after her fiancée Owen pushed her down the stairs, because he was jealous. After her death Annie was invisible to all other humans. She never left the house and had no person to talk to until George and Mitchell moved in. As supernatural beings they could see Annie and talk to her. Together the three of them tried to live a human life.
- George Sands is a werewolf. While he was human he planned to study medicine since he had an IQ of 156. After he became a werewolf George left his family, friends and fiancée without saying a word. He lived a life as a loner until he met Mitchell and became friends with him. Together they moved into a house and got to know Annie who soon became their friend.
- John Mitchell is born on 29 July 1893. In his early 20s he starts fighting for the British army in the first world war. In 1917 he meets Herrick on the battle field. Herrick wants to spare the lives of Mitchell's men, if Mitchell becomes a vampire. Mitchell agrees. After this Mitchell becomes a ruthless vampire who kills many people together with his maker Herrick. In 1969 he meets his human girlfriend Josie and gets clean from blood. He tries to be good. Even though Josie is one of the few women that Mitchell really loves, their relationship only lasts a short while. At the end of the 1970s Mitchell starts drinking blood again. In 2000 Mitchell's vampire friend Carl helps Mitchell to get clean again. He stays clean for a while until he accidentally kills his date Lauren Drake, during sex. Since Mitchell doesn't want something like this to happen again he wants to move into a flat together with the werewolf George. He hopes that George can support him. When George and Mitchell move into a house they realize that the ghost Annie is already living in there. Together the three of them try to support each other and try to live a human life.
- Gemma Romain is a ghost. She was in purgatory for 12 years until she gets through a door in Annie's living room to the flat of Annie's, George's and Mitchell's room. Gemma has died of cancer, her son Lee killed himself and didn't visit her very often while she was ill.
- Kaz is a nurse at the St. Jude's hospital. She is lesbian and a hippy. Kaz wants to have a baby together with her girlfriend Gail.
- Gail is a pretty black nurse at the St. Jude's hospital. She is Kaz's girlfriend and wants to have children with her. Gail is very intelligent.
- Dr. Declan McGough is the new administrator at the St. Jude's hospital. His daughter Jenny has died because of a vampire attack in the 70s.
- Denise O'Halloran is an old friend of Annie and Owen. Since she spends most of the time in foreign countries, she didn't hear that Annie has died. When she sees Annie again and hears that Annie doesn't go out much anymore Denise wants to change that.

=== Guest characters ===
==== Vampires ====
- Albert is a vampire. While Herrick was alive, Albert tried to get his attention, however Herrick always preferred Mitchell. After Herrick's death Albert wants to become the new leader of the vampires.(The Road, Chasers)
- Arnold is a vampire, he is the father of Christopher and the husband of Betty.(Bad Blood)
- Betty is a vampire, she is the mother of Christopher and the wife of Arnold.(Bad Blood)
- Christopher is a vampire. He is infected by Justine. Because Christopher still loves his parents (Arnold and Betty) very much, he turns them into vampires. In the 70s Mitchell is meeting Christopher. Christopher is feeding on children. Since Herrick thinks that killing a child draws too much attention to the vampires, Mitchell warns Christopher to stop. Christopher doesn't stop after this. So Mitchell is locking Christopher into a cellar and filling it with cement. Christopher is crying but Mitchell doesn't help.(Bad Blood)
- Janice Prescott works for Dr. Declan McGough until she is turned into a vampire. She enjoys being a vampire.(The Road, Chasers, Bad Blood)
- Justine is a vampire and a friend of Mitchell. She turned Christopher into a vampire.(Bad Blood)
- Olive King is a very powerful vampire. She looks like Grace Jones.(Chasers, Bad Blood)
- Sanjay is an Indian vampire. He has been a vampire for a very long time.(Bad Blood)
- Stu is a very young vampire, who has been infected recently. He is in a gang of several young vampires. At a party he drugged George's drink.(Chasers)
- William Herrick is Mitchell's infector. He used to work for the police and was the leader of the vampires in Bristol but he was killed by George at the end of Series One.(The Road, Chasers, Bad Blood)

==== Ghosts ====
- Lee Romain is the son of Gemma. He became a ghost after he killed himself.(The Road)
- Barry Jones is a ghost and a friend of Lee. After Lee killed himself he thinks that he and his friends are responsible for Lees suicide.(The Road)
- Chantell Roy is a ghost and a friend of Lee, Barry Chantell, Rebecca and Thomas.(The Road)
- Rebecca Hywel-Jones was in a coma for 12 years. She was a patient at St. Jude's Hospital. When her ghost friends pulled the plug on the life-support equipment, she died and became a ghost.(The Road)
- Thomas Ho is a Chinese ghost. He used to be a friend of Lee, Chantell, Barry and Rebecca.(The Road)

==== Humans ====
- Flo is George's aunt. He was the first one who saw her after she died in the kitchen.(Bad Blood)
- Gavin Foot is a reporter and investigating the suspicious deaths of Thomas, Barry etc.(The Road, Chasers, Bad Blood)
- Ian is a nurse at the St. Judes Hospital. He is gay.(The Road)
- Jenny McGough is the daughter of Dr. Declan McGuff. She dies in the 70s after a vampire attack. After her death the police don't try to solve the crime, they hide the fact that she died from exsanguination.(Bad Blood)
- Jim Wright is a coma patient at the Intensive Care Unit of the St. Judes Hospital. His wife visits him there until he dies.(The Road)
- Julia Beckett is the former fiancée of George.(Bad Blood)
- Leo Willis is a patient at the St. Judes hospital. He tells Mitchell that he has cancer and likes the 80s. Mitchell and Leo spend a lot of time together.(Chasers)
- Moonpaw is an old hippy woman. She is a friend of Kaz and Rainbow and runs an esoteric shop together with Rainbow. Moonpaw has cancer. She is deathly sick, that is why she can see Annie.(Chasers, Bad Blood)
- Mrs. Wright: Mitchell meets Mrs. Wright at the hospital, she is visiting her husband "Jim Wright", who is in a coma.(The Road)
- Rainbow Jones is a friend of Kaz. She runs an esoteric shop together with Moonpaw. She can't see Annie, while her friend Moonpaw can.(Chasers, Bad Blood)
- Sarah is the receptionist of the St. Jude's hospital. She looks like Nina and fancies Mitchell.(The Road, Chasers, Bad Blood)
- Trevor Moss works at the St. Jude's hospital and organizes the bowling club.(The Road, Chasers, Bad Blood)

==== Demons ====
- The Men with Sticks and Rope are demons, who are waiting for the dead in afterlife. They bring the creatures who didn't behave well to Hell. Mitchell, Annie, and other ghost and vampires have seen them after they died. Most vampires and ghosts are afraid of them. The Men with Sticks and Rope want to catch Annie because she didn't go through her first door, which leads to her afterlife. Annie is always afraid that they might come for her, especially when she is alone. When she meets Gemma, she thinks that they might find her when they are looking for Gemma. She sees that Gemma is afraid of something and Annie is sure that these are "the Men with Sticks and Rope." The Men with Sticks and Rope are also leaving messages in the novels for Annie, telling her that they are coming for her (The Road, Chasers, Bad Blood).

== Release ==
=== Novels ===
Number	Title	Author	Year	Publisher	ISBN
1	The Road	Simon Guerrier	2010	Random House - (BBC Books)	ISBN 978-1-84607-898-9
2	Chasers	Mark Michalowski	2010	Random House (BBC Books)	ISBN 978-1-84607-899-6
3	Bad Blood	James Goss	2010	Random House (BBC Books)	ISBN 978-1-84607-900-9

=== Audio books ===
#	Title	Author	Read by	Length	Published (download/cd)	ISBN (audio download)	ISBN (audio cd)
01	The Road	Simon Guerrier	Lenora Crichlow	5 hours 38 minutes	7 November 2012/16 April 2013	ISBN 9781471305115	ISBN 9781620647240
02	Chasers	Mark Michalowski	Russell Tovey	5 hours 18 minutes	1 November 2012/15 April 2013	ISBN 9781471305252	ISBN 9781471305283
03	Bad Blood	James Goss	Lucy Gaskell	6 hours 45 minutes	1 November 2012/15 May 2013	ISBN 9781471305290	ISBN 9781471305306

== Critical reception ==
Jayne Nelson (for the SFX Magazine) explains that all three authors have managed to capture the "snarkiness", which, according to Nelson, is a main element of the show. Paul Simpsons explains that all three authors have successfully gotten the voices of the main characters right. According to him the books are a quick and nice reads for fans of the series. The author Joanne Black says that there are a few inconsistencies in the books, but they are an entertaining read. She describes them as sharply plotted and explains that they are keeping the "overall feel of the series". Amie Gibb adds that fans of series like Being Human, True Blood, The Vampire Diaries, or Ghost Whisperer will enjoy the novels.

=== The Road ===
Dave Adamson writes that the first novel The Road turned out very good, tells an interesting story and is a fantastic start for the book series. Frank Collins adds that The Road is an "engrossing mystery written in a brittle prose that conjures up the swirling emotions of loss and revenge eating away at broken human lives that test the enduring spirits" of the three main characters. Jayne Nelson (for the SFX Magazine) appens{?} that Simon Guerrier describes the characters perfectly, even their small personality traits, although she thinks that there is to little action in the plot. Charles Packer calls the book a combination of a murder mystery and haunted house theme with a lot of humor. He explains that all three main characters of the series are true to their television counterparts. He mentions that one doesn't need to see the series, to enjoy the novel. Parker gives the book 8 of 10 points. SciFiChick adds that the road is a "fast-paced read" and a great start of the novel series.

=== Chasers ===
Michael Bush writes about Chasers that the author captures the essence of Being Human and is playing out plots that fit within the context of the series. He also praises the authors gift to capture "the voices of Toby Whithouse's characters and the quirks of the actors who play them." Frank Collins adds that Chasers is warm, often hilariously funny and very moving. Jayne Nelson (for the SFX Magazine) mentions that she enjoyed the humor of the book, but found the ending oddly anticlimactic. Charles Packer also mentions the enjoyable humour of the book. According to Packer the book is entertaining and captures the essence of the Being Human characters. Packer gives the book 7 of 10 points. According to SciFiChick Chasers picks up where the previous novel left off. The story darkens and more questions come up as to what is going on at the hospital.

=== Bad Blood ===
Lucy Felthouse writes about Bad Blood that the read was a good fun. The writing "lulled" once or twice, but she would still recommend the book, whether someone has seen the show or not. Jayne Nelson (for the SFX Magazine) added that James Goss has great experiential ideas, like naming chapters after bingo calls or "breaking the fourth wall" between the reader and the story. According to Jayne Nelson Bad Blood is a fun read and does juice to the television series which manufactured the novels. The author Joanne Black explains that she especially likes the internal monologues from the characters about age, holidays and death. Charles Packer added that James Goss has a nice and easy writing style. The story is well constructed and there are a lot of humorous moments. James Goss manages to capture the characters of Mitchell and Annie well, but Packer felt "that Goss's take on George’s obsessional neurosis tended to be played for laughs and made his character more two-dimensional than that portrayed in the show". Packer gives the book 6 of 10 points. SciFiChick Chasers explains that there is no plot progression in the first half of the book. But then the stoty gets exciting. In the finale questions about the story and characters are answered and the novel comes to a satisfying conclusion.

== See also ==
- List of television series made into books
- Vampire literature
