= Freema Agyeman =

British actress (born 1979)

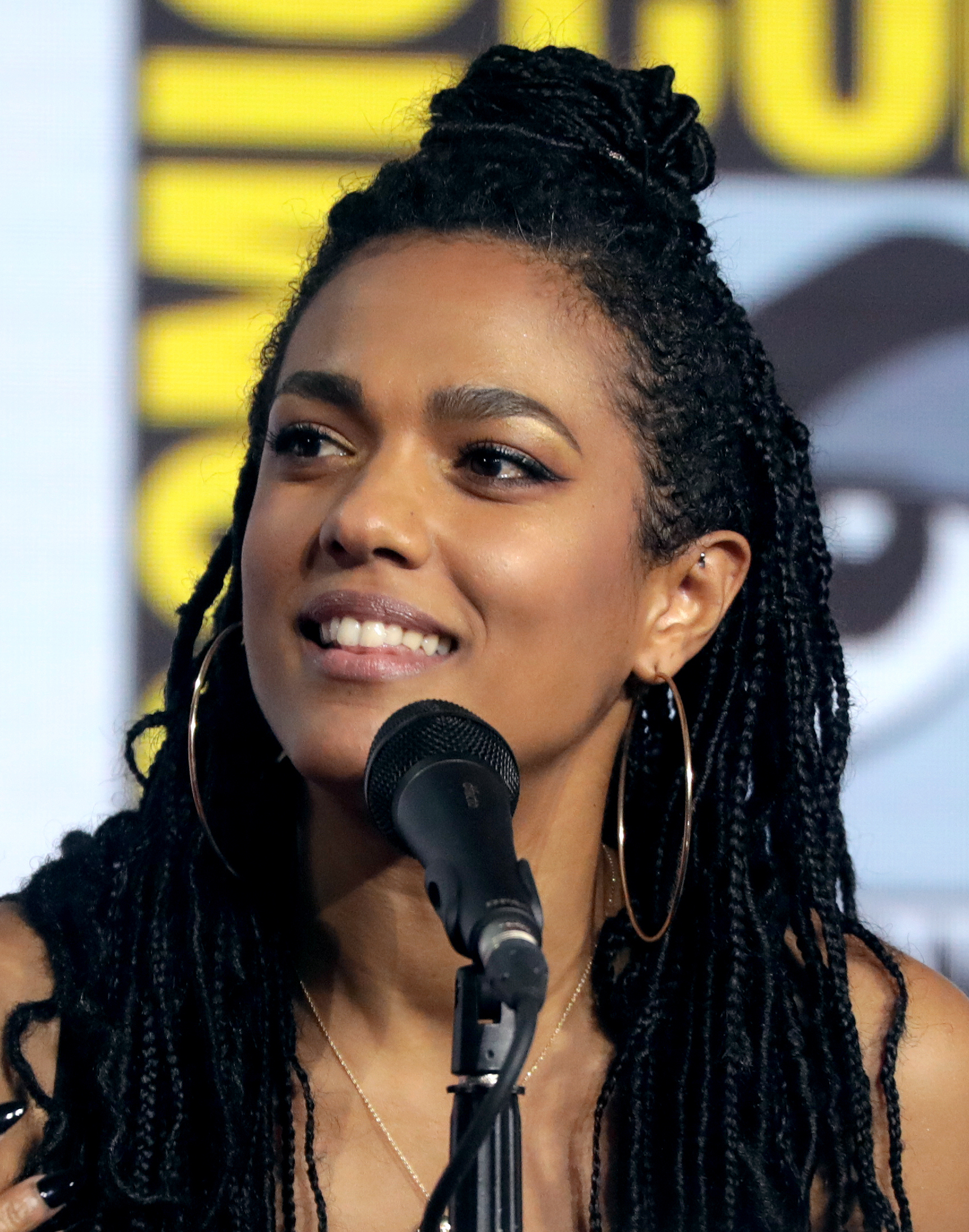
- Agyeman at the 2019 San Diego Comic-Con
- Born: Frema Agyeman; 20 March 1979 (age 47); London, England
- Education: Middlesex University (BA)
- Occupation: Actress
- Years active: 2001–present
- Television: Doctor Who; Law & Order: UK; Little Dorrit; New Amsterdam; Sense8; The Carrie Diaries

Freema Agyeman (/ˈfriːmə ˈædʒɪmən/; born Frema Agyeman; 20 March 1979) is an English actress. She rose to fame with her role as the Doctor's companion Martha Jones in the BBC science fiction series Doctor Who (2007–2010) and its spin-off Torchwood (2008), and received further recognition for playing Crown Prosecutor Alesha Phillips in the ITV crime procedural Law & Order: UK (2009–2012), Amanita Caplan in the Netflix science fiction drama Sense8 (2015–2018) and Dr. Helen Sharpe in the NBC medical drama New Amsterdam (2018–2023).

Following her departure from Doctor Who, Agyeman reprised her role as Martha Jones in the Doctor Who spin-off series Torchwood and had a part as Tattycoram in the BBC period miniseries Little Dorrit (both 2008). In 2013, she made her US television debut in The CW's Sex and the City prequel series, The Carrie Diaries, as magazine editor Larissa Loughlin.

Her other television appearances include Mile High (2005), Bizarre ER (2008), and Dreamland (2023). Agyeman has also appeared in films, including North v South (2015), Eat Locals (2017), and The Matrix Resurrections (2021).

== Early life ==
Agyeman was born on 20 March 1979 in Hackney, East London. Her mother, Azar Azizian-Kohan, born in 1948, is Iranian, and her father, Osei Agyeman, is Ghanaian. They divorced when she was young. Agyeman has an older sister, Leila, and a younger brother, Dominic.

Although her mother was raised as a Muslim and her father was raised as a Methodist, Agyeman grew up to be a practising Roman Catholic. Agyeman attended Our Lady's Convent RC High School, a Catholic school in Stamford Hill. Later, during the summer of 1996, she attended the Anna Scher Theatre School in Islington, North London, and studied performing arts and drama at Middlesex University, graduating in 2000. She also took a theatrical course at Radford University in Virginia in 1998, even volunteering to work as a box-office assistant for student drama productions in which she was not cast.

== Career ==
=== Early work ===
When Agyeman began her professional acting career, she chose to use a different spelling of her birth name, Frema, as her professional name, to avoid pronunciation problems.

Before securing the part of Martha Jones in Doctor Who, Agyeman's most famous television role was playing Lola Wise in the revived series of the ITV soap opera Crossroads. For her performance, she was nominated in two categories, Best Newcomer and Sexiest Female, at the 2003 British Soap Awards. Agyeman also had small guest roles in such TV series as BBC's long-running medical drama Casualty, Sky One's airline drama Mile High and ITV's police procedural The Bill, in which she appeared twice as two separate characters. In 2005, she played Mary Ogden, a scene of crime officer, in an episode of Silent Witness.

Agyeman made her feature film debut in 2006, playing Nana in the independent drama Rulers and Dealers (2006), written and directed by Stephen Lloyd Jackson.

=== Doctor Who and Torchwood ===
When we cast the character of Adeola, I met Freema [Agyeman] for this part – actually, I met her for two parts – and when I met her, as soon as she walked through the door, I knew she was going to be quite exceptional. When she walked in, I thought I was looking at Halle Berry English-style...

— Graeme Harper

Agyeman auditioned for three roles in the 2006 series of Doctor Who. On 24 June 2005, she auditioned for the part of Sally Jacobs in "The Christmas Invasion", but the role went to Anita Briem, who better fitted the production team's concept of the character as an "ice cool blonde". Agyeman later auditioned for the roles of Esme and Adeola Oshodi, in the "Rise of the Cybermen"/"The Age of Steel" and "Army of Ghosts", respectively. Esme was ultimately cut from the final script, but Agyeman was successful in her audition for Adeola. She filmed her role in the series in December 2005 and appeared on screen as Adeola on 1 July 2006. Agyeman studied dance and practised horse riding, martial arts and gymnastics, a fact that the producers exploited to provide her with more physically arduous action scenes.

The production team was impressed by the versatility shown by Agyeman across her three auditions and called her back as a serious candidate for the new companion. She attended another audition (ostensibly for an episode of Torchwood) before a final screen test with Tenth Doctor actor David Tennant. Tennant left a reassuring note under the door of Agyeman's hotel room, and this helped calm any nerves the actress had. Following extensive speculation on who would replace Billie Piper, Agyeman was confirmed to the press as new companion Martha Jones on 5 July 2006.

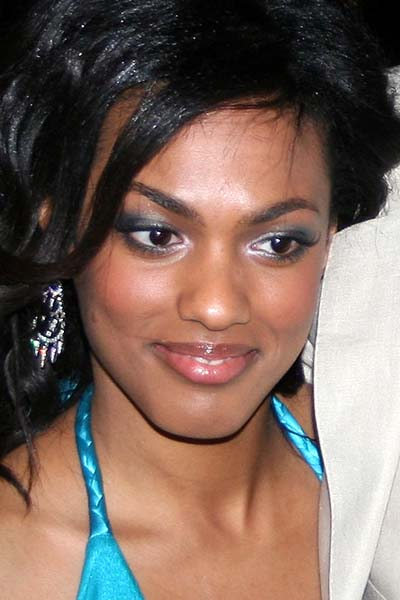
Agyeman at the gala screening of the third series of Doctor Who in 2007

Agyeman began filming for the third series in August 2006 and finished in March 2007. She made her screen debut as medical student Martha on 31 March 2007 in the episode "Smith and Jones". A line of dialogue explains that Adeola was Martha's cousin. Agyeman continued to portray the character throughout every episode of the series. In the series finale, "Last of the Time Lords", Martha left the Doctor of her own accord after recognising how unhealthy their relationship had become, but promised that she would see him again. Agyeman also voiced the character in the animated serial The Infinite Quest, which aired in twelve weekly segments during the run of the 2007 series.

In 2007, Agyeman's performance as Martha was praised at several award ceremonies. In June, she was named Best Newcomer at Glamour's Women of the Year Awards. In October, she won the People's Choice category for Favourite Female TV Star at the 5th Screen Nation Film & TV Awards and became one of the top four nominees for Most Popular Actress at the 13th National Television Awards. The role also got her nominations in the Best Actress categories at the TV Quick Awards and the Golden Nymph Awards. In December, The Observer had an interview with Agyeman and named her as one of their Faces of 2007.

The following year, Agyeman returned as Martha in five episodes of the fourth series of the show. Following the series finale, Agyeman stated that she would be open to reprising the role. She later returned to the series along with several other former cast members to mark David Tennant's final appearance in "The End of Time". Concurrent with her appearance on the show, Agyeman read abridged audiobook adaptations of five of the Doctor Who New Series Adventures novels featuring Martha, namely The Last Dodo, Wetworld, The Pirate Loop, Martha in the Mirror and The Story of Martha.

I'd like to think that there will be more for Martha Jones, because Doctor Who has been one of the biggest experiences of my life, both in terms of my career and in terms of how it has changed my life over the last two years. I dare say a great number of people will always associate me with Martha, and that really makes me smile. It means that she lives on. That's so flattering. It's an honour. I'd love to do more with her, definitely...

— Agyeman in July 2008

In between the third and fourth series of Doctor Who, Agyeman appeared in three episodes of the show's spin-off drama Torchwood, namely "Reset", "Dead Man Walking" and "A Day in the Death". She also had a starring role in the Torchwood radio play "Lost Souls", broadcast on BBC Radio 4 on 10 September 2008 to promote the activation of the Large Hadron Collider at the CERN research facility on that same day. It was later revealed by director Euros Lyn that the production team had intended for Agyeman to also appear in the third series of Torchwood, but she was already committed to Law & Order: UK.

In February 2020, she reprised her role as Martha in the Torchwood audio drama "Dissected", produced by Big Finish Productions. In July 2021, a new three-part audio series starring Agyeman was announced, The Year of Martha Jones. It was released in December and depicted Martha during the year she spent travelling the Earth in the third series finale of Doctor Who.

=== Other work ===
Agyeman appeared several times on The Bedtime Hour on CBeebies, reading the story broadcast shortly before 7.00 pm. She narrated the first series of BBC Three's hospital documentary series Bizarre ER, which ran from 14 February to 3 April 2008 and also provided the narration for a second series which began airing on 21 April 2009. Agyeman hosted a Doctor Who-themed portion of the BBC Proms on 27 July. A one-hour cut-down version of the prom made its TV debut on BBC One, New Year's Day, 2009.

Agyeman played foundling girl Tattycoram in the Emmy Award-winning 2008 BBC adaptation of Charles Dickens's Little Dorrit, which began on 26 October 2008, starring alongside her fellow Torchwood co-stars Eve Myles and Ruth Jones. Some of Agyeman's scenes for the first episode were shot in the grounds of Deal Castle, Kent, which doubled for Marseille, France. Agyeman was delighted to have appeared in Little Dorrit, as it had always been a dream of hers to appear in a period drama. In 2008, Agyeman also appeared in Survivors, a BBC One remake of the cult 1970s TV series, as Jenny Walsh (surname was originally reported to be Collins), although her character was killed off in the first episode in a shock twist despite featuring prominently in promotional materials for the series.

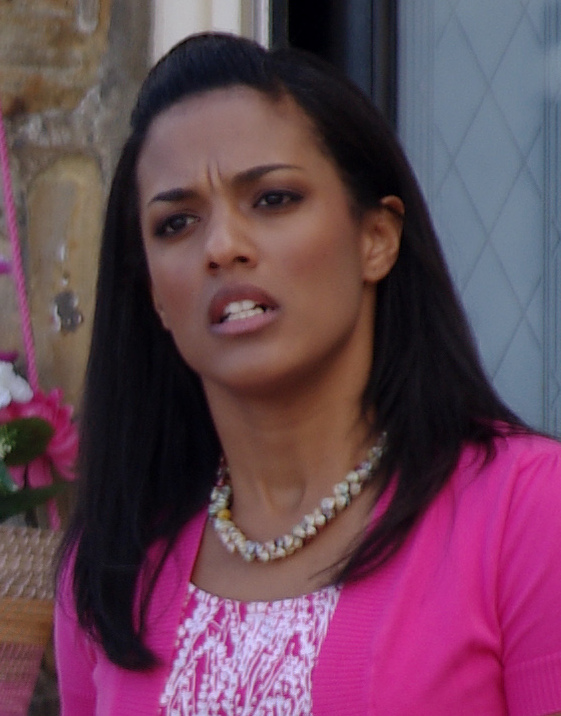
Agyeman on the set of Old Jack's Boat in 2012

Between 2009 and 2012, Agyeman appeared as Crown Prosecutor Alesha Phillips in Law & Order: UK, a UK adaptation and spin-off from the US Law & Order franchise. Agyeman is a self-professed "massive fan" of the original Law & Order series, especially the third and fourth seasons. In preparation for the role, Agyeman sat in on live trials, toured the Old Bailey, and conferred with her law-degree-holding sister, Leila: "She's great and really patient at explaining things to laymen, because I was coming at it completely blind. She's been a good source." She remained with the programme for its first six series departing the cast before the seventh series due to other filming commitments. For her role as Alesha Phillips, Agyeman was longlisted for the National Television Awards for Outstanding Drama Performance several times. She was also nominated for Best UK Actress at the 2009 Birmingham Black International Film Festival's Music, Video and Screen Awards.

In March 2012, it was announced that Agyeman would play Larissa, "an easy-going party girl who works at Interview magazine" in the pilot of the Sex and the City prequel The Carrie Diaries (2013–2014). In early 2013, she starred in the CBeebies television series Old Jack's Boat as Shelley.

I think having the opportunity to play [Amanita] has probably been the most significant moment in my career. To play this queer, cisgendered, urban hippy who is an active campaigner for freedom to love. And to just be so free in her own skin and revel in her sexuality, and celebrate life and love and the flesh. I mean, I am truly going to miss the strength of that character and inhabiting her.

— Agyeman on her Sense8 role in June 2018

In 2015, Agyeman appeared in the Netflix series Sense8 (2015–2018), created by J. Michael Straczynski and Lilly and Lana Wachowski. She played series regular Amanita Caplan, the girlfriend of Nomi, a trans woman blogger and hacktivist. In the same year, she starred as Penny, a woman embroiled in a crime war between northern and southern UK gangs, in the film North v South. The film was poorly received by critics, but earned Agyeman nominations at both the Screen Nation Film & TV Awards and the National Film Awards. Her other film appearances include the role of Angel in the vampire film Eat Locals (2017), co-starring Charlie Cox, and a small part as Astra in the science fiction blockbuster The Matrix Resurrections (2021).

In 2018, Agyeman became a member of the main cast of the NBC medical drama series New Amsterdam, playing the role of Dr. Helen Sharpe, the head of the oncology and hematology department. In July 2022, she announced that she would not be returning to New Amsterdam for its fifth and final season, instead signing up for Sky Max's comedy-drama Dreamland, which also featured singer Lily Allen in her first television lead role.

Since 2024, Agyeman has provided voiceover for various advertising campaigns for the British health and beauty chain Boots.

== Personal life ==
The tattoo Agyeman has on her upper arm is symbolic of her Iranian ancestry, containing the Persian/Iranian word "raha", meaning "free", under an image of a butterfly.

Agyeman is a non-church-going Roman Catholic. She has stated that doing good is her way of believing in God and expressing Catholic Christianity.

After working in the United States for a number of years, Agyeman returned to England upon exiting New Amsterdam.

== Filmography ==
=== Film ===
Year	Title	Role	Notes
2004	Aisha the American	Shaheen	Short film
2006	Rulers and Dealers	Nana	
2015	North v South	Penny	
2017	Eat Locals	Angel	
2021	The Matrix Resurrections	Astra	

=== Television ===
Year	Title	Role	Notes
2003	Crossroads	Lola Wise	Unknown episodes
2004	The Bill	Jenna Carter	Episode: "Condition Critical: Part 1"
2004	Casualty@Holby City	Kate Hindley	Episode: "Casualty@Holby City: Part One"
2005	Mile High	Girl No. 1	Episode #2.26
2005	Silent Witness	Mary Ogden	Episode: "Choices: Part 1"
2006	The Bill	Shakira Washington	Episode: "Condition: Critical – Part 1 & 2"
2006	Doctor Who	Adeola Oshodi	Episode: "Army of Ghosts"
2007–2008, 2010	Doctor Who	Martha Jones	Main cast (series 3–4), guest role (2010 special); 19 episodes
2007–2008	Doctor Who Confidential	Herself	Recurring role
2007	Totally Doctor Who	Herself	7 episodes
2007	The Infinite Quest	Martha Jones (voice)	13 episodes
2007	The Omid Djalili Show	Herself	Episode #1.3
2008	Torchwood	Martha Jones	3 episodes
2008	Torchwood Declassified	Herself	2 episodes
2008	Little Dorrit	Tattycoram	Miniseries; 8 episodes
2008	Survivors	Jenny Walsh	2 episodes
2008–2010	Bizarre ER	Herself	Narrator (series 1–3); 30 episodes
2009–2012	Law & Order: UK	Alesha Phillips	Main cast (series 1–3); 39 episodes
2013–2015	The Carrie Diaries	Larissa Loughlin	Main cast; 22 episodes
2013–2015	Old Jack's Boat	Shelly Periwinkle Pearl the Mermaid	Main cast (series 1); 12 episodes
2013	Rubenesque	Trudy	One-off drama
2015–2018	Sense8	Amanita Caplan	Main cast; 24 episodes
2017	Panorama	Narrator	Episode: "When Kids Abuse Kids"
2018–2023	New Amsterdam	Dr. Helen Sharpe	Main cast (season 1–4), guest role (season 5); 76 episodes
2023	Dreamland	Trish	Main cast; 6 episodes

=== Audio and radio ===
Year	Title	Role	Notes
2007	The Last Dodo	Narrator	Doctor Who audiobooks
2007	Wetworld	Narrator	Doctor Who audiobooks
2007	The Pirate Loop	Narrator	Doctor Who audiobooks
2008	Martha in the Mirror	Narrator	Doctor Who audiobooks
2008	Lost Souls	Martha Jones	Full-cast Torchwood radio drama
2008	The Story of Martha	Narrator	Doctor Who audiobook
2014	Six Degrees of Assassination	Ellen Townsend	Full-cast Audible audio drama
2020	Torchwood: Dissected	Martha Jones	Full-cast Torchwood audio drama
2021	The Year of Martha Jones	Martha Jones	Full-cast Doctor Who audio drama boxset

=== Theatre ===
Year	Title	Role	Playwright	Notes	Ref.
2001–2002	When Snow Falls	T	Chris Elwell		
2001	Twisted Roots	Anya Starr	Emily Nightingale		
2002	Lords and Ladies	Elf Queen / Casanunda	Terry Pratchett		
2008	Doctor Who Prom	Herself (host)	—N/a	Concert at the Royal Albert Hall	
2017	Apologia	Claire	Alexi Kaye Campbell		
2023	God of Carnage	Véronique Vallon	Yasmina Reza		
2024	Romeo & Juliet	Nurse	William Shakespeare	Directed by Jamie Lloyd	
2024	White Rabbit Red Rabbit	Performer	Nassim Soleimanpur	One night only; Soho Place, London	
2024	Twelfth Night	Olivia	William Shakespeare	Directed by Prasanna Puwanarajah	
2025	Much Ado About Nothing	Beatrice	William Shakespeare		
2025	Twelfth Night	Olivia	William Shakespeare	Directed by Prasanna Puwanarajah	

== Awards and nominations ==
Year	Award	Category	Work	Result
2003	British Soap Awards	Best Newcomer	Crossroads	Nominated
2003	British Soap Awards	Sexiest Female	Crossroads	Nominated
2007	Glamour Awards	Best Newcomer	Doctor Who	Won
2007	Golden Nymph Awards	Outstanding Actress – Drama Series	Doctor Who	Nominated
2007	TV Quick Awards	Best Actress	Doctor Who	Nominated
2007	Screen Nation Film & TV Awards	Favourite Female TV Star	Doctor Who	Won
2009	Music, Video and Screen Awards	Best UK Actress	Law & Order: UK	Nominated
2011	TV Choice Awards	Best Actress	Law & Order: UK	Nominated
2016	National Film Awards	Best Actress	North v South	Nominated
2016	Screen Nation Film & TV Awards	Female Performance in Film	North v South	Nominated
2016	Screen Nation Film & TV Awards	Female Performance in TV	Sense8	Nominated
2020	CinEuphoria Awards	Freedom of Expression – Honorary Award (shared with the cast and crew)	New Amsterdam	Won
2022	Hollywood Critics Association TV Awards	Best Actress in a Broadcast Network or Cable Series, Drama	New Amsterdam	Nominated
