= North v South (film) =

- Directed by: Steven Nesbit
- Written by: Steven Nesbit
- Starring: Freema Agyeman; Keith Allen; Bernard Hill; Steven Berkoff
- Cinematography: Kyle Heslop
- Music by: Neil Athale
- Release date: 21 June 2015 (Edinburgh)
- Running time: 96 minutes
- Country: United Kingdom
- Language: English

North v South is a 2015 British drama film written and directed by Steven Nesbit, and featuring Freema Agyeman and Keith Allen.

== Plot ==
The film is about feuding criminal gangs, divided along England's North–South divide. When two young lovers (Terry - Elliot Tittensor and Willow - Charlotte Hope) realise that they belong to rival gangs, they quickly discover that their love must be hidden from their gang leaders Vic Clarke (Berkoff) and John Claridge (Hill) for fear of causing an inter-gang war.

== Cast ==
- Freema Agyeman as Penny
- Keith Allen as Tony Lefevre
- Bernard Hill as John Claridge
- Steven Berkoff as Vic Clarke
- Charlotte Hope as Willow Clarke
- Judith Alexander as Sandra
- Geoff Bell as Bill Vincent
- Gary Cargill as Danny
- Oliver Cotton as Brian Galloway
- Steve Evets as Alf
- Paul Howell as captive
- Striker John as Police Officer
- Dom Monot as Gustave
- Brad Moore as Gary Little
- Roger Nevares as Wally
- Georgia Odette as Waitress
- Ryan Oliva as Big Dave
- Wayne Russell as Police Officer
- Greta Scacchi as Mrs. Singer
- Elliott Tittensor as Terry Singer
- Sydney Wade as Sam

== Release ==
It had its world premiere at the Edinburgh International Film Festival.

The film was not released to cinemas, but directly to DVD.

== Reception ==
The film was poorly received by critics, with a review in The Guardian giving the film only two out of five stars: "Despite its semi-interesting premise, a new take on star-crossed lovers, Steven Nesbit's low-budget Brit gangster flick fails to deliver".
