= Bizarre ER =

- Genre: Documentary, Comedy, Reality
- Narrated by: Freema Agyeman (series 1–3); Sheridan Smith (series 4); John Barrowman (series 5); Tom Davis (series 6)
- Theme music composer: Patrick Wolf
- Opening theme: "Accident & Emergency"
- Country of origin: United Kingdom
- Original language: English
- No. of series: 6 (5 in the UK, 1 in the U.S.)
- No. of episodes: 40 (UK)

Production
- Running time: 30 minutes (series 1–4, UK; series 5, USA); 60 minutes (series 6–, UK)
- Production company: Maverick Television

Original release
- Network: BBC Three (series 1–4); TLC/Discovery (series 5); E4 (series 6)
- Release: 14 February 2008 – 16 May 2017

Related
- Bizarre Animal ER

Bizarre ER is a BBC Three, and later E4, television show that deals with hospital mishaps.

== Series guide ==
Every episode shows a miraculous survival story and strange facts, like the woman who fell out of a plane at 35,000 ft and survived. Series 2 began airing on 21 April 2009 and consists of ten 30 minute episodes. Series 1 and 2 were filmed at the Norfolk and Norwich University Hospital.

Following the first five episodes, the show's animal counterpart Bizarre Animal ER, narrated by Kevin Bishop, aired for eight episodes on BBC Three in Bizarre ER's Tuesday slot. Bizarre ER returned after for five more episodes.

Bizarre ER returned for a twelve-part third series from 10 May 2010 and finished on 19 July 2010. The series was filmed at the Northampton General Hospital.

The series returned for a ten-part fourth series on 28 March 2011, now narrated by Sheridan Smith. Filming takes place at Northampton General Hospital as well as Bradford Royal Infirmary. The series also features bizarre operations that have happened around the world.

Series 5 is set in the US with John Barrowman as narrator, it started in March 2013 and ended in May 2013. Series 6 is set at several hospitals across the UK; locations include Dudley, Warwick, Basingstoke and the Isle of Wight.

== International broadcast ==
Bizarre ER is now airing in the U.S. on the Discovery Life channel. In Italy, it is broadcast by DMAX.

== Transmissions ==
Series	Start date	End date	Episodes	Narrator	Country of broadcast
1	14 February 2008	3 April 2008	8	Freema Agyeman	United Kingdom
2	21 April 2009	14 July 2009	10	Freema Agyeman	United Kingdom
3	10 May 2010	19 July 2010	12	Freema Agyeman	United Kingdom
4	28 March 2011	30 May 2011	10	Sheridan Smith	United Kingdom
5	19 March 2013	7 May 2013	8	John Barrowman	United States
6	14 March 2017	16 May 2017	10	Tom Davis	United Kingdom

=== Series 1 (2008) ===
Overall no.	Series no.	Episode	Original broadcast
1	1	Episode One	14 February 2008
2	2	Episode Two	21 February 2008
3	3	Episode Three	28 February 2008
4	4	Episode Four	6 March 2008
5	5	Episode Five	13 March 2008
6	6	Episode Six	20 March 2008
7	7	Episode Seven	27 March 2008
8	8	Episode Eight	3 April 2008

=== Series 2 (2009) ===
Overall no.	Series no.	Episode	Original broadcast
9	1	Episode One	21 April 2009
10	2	Episode Two	28 April 2009
11	3	Episode Three	5 May 2009
12	4	Episode Four	12 May 2009
13	5	Episode Five	19 May 2009
14	6	Episode Six	16 June 2009
15	7	Episode Seven	23 June 2009
16	8	Episode Eight	30 June 2009
17	9	Episode Nine	7 July 2009
18	10	Episode Ten	14 July 2009

=== Series 3 (2010) ===
Series no.	Overall no.	Episode	Original broadcast
19	1	Episode One	10 May 2010
20	2	Episode Two	10 May 2010
21	3	Episode Three	17 May 2010
22	4	Episode Four	24 May 2010
23	5	Episode Five	31 May 2010
24	6	Episode Six	7 June 2010
25	7	Episode Seven	14 June 2010
26	8	Episode Eight	21 June 2010
27	9	Episode Nine	28 June 2010
28	10	Episode Ten	5 July 2010
29	11	Episode Eleven	12 July 2010
30	12	Episode Twelve	19 July 2010

=== Series 4 (2011) ===
Series no.	Overall no.	Episode	Original broadcast
31	1	Episode One	28 March 2011
32	2	Episode Two	4 April 2011
33	3	Episode Three	11 April 2011
34	4	Episode Four	18 April 2011
35	5	Episode Five	25 April 2011
36	6	Episode Six	2 May 2011
37	7	Episode Seven	9 May 2011
38	8	Episode Eight	16 May 2011
39	9	Episode Nine	23 May 2011
40	10	Episode Ten	30 May 2011

=== Series 5 (2013) ===
Series no.	Overall no.	Episode	Original broadcast
41	1	Episode One	19 March 2013
42	2	Episode Two	26 March 2013
43	3	Episode Three	2 April 2013
44	4	Episode Four	9 April 2013
45	5	Episode Five	16 April 2013
46	6	Episode Six	23 April 2013
47	7	Episode Seven	30 April 2013
48	8	Episode Eight	7 May 2013

=== Series 6 (2017) ===
Series no.	Overall no.	Episode	Original broadcast
49	1	Episode One	14 March 2017
50	2	Episode Two	21 March 2017
51	3	Episode Three	28 March 2017
52	4	Episode Four	4 April 2017
53	5	Episode Five	11 April 2017
54	6	Episode Six	18 April 2017
55	7	Episode Seven	25 April 2017
56	8	Episode Eight	2 May 2017
57	9	Episode Nine	9 May 2017
58	10	Episode Ten	16 May 2017

Bizarre Animal ER

Series	Start date	End date	Episodes	Narrator	Country of broadcast
1	26 May 2009	5 November 2009	8	Kevin Bishop	United Kingdom
