= The Last Dodo =

2007 novel by Jacqueline Rayner

- Author: Jacqueline Rayner
- Series: Doctor Who book: New Series Adventures
- Release number: 14
- Subject: Featuring: Tenth Doctor; Martha Jones
- Set in: Period between "Evolution of the Daleks" and "Utopia"
- Publisher: BBC Books
- Publication date: 19 April 2007
- ISBN: 9781846072246
- Preceded by: Sting of the Zygons
- Followed by: Wooden Heart

The Last Dodo is a BBC Books original novel written by Jacqueline Rayner and based on the long running science fiction television series Doctor Who. It features the Tenth Doctor and Martha Jones. It was published on 19 April 2007, after the television debut of companion Martha Jones, alongside Sting of the Zygons, and Wooden Heart.

== Synopsis ==
The Doctor and Martha Jones go searching for the last dodo. They end up in a museum featuring the last examples of extinct species, all in suspended animation. Many of the exhibits are going missing. The Doctor himself is in danger because he is the last of his race.

== Plot ==
Upon being asked where she wants to go next, Martha chooses the zoo, falling back on childhood memories which appears to upset the Doctor who later admits the idea of animals in cages hurts him. Seeing the Doctor using a dodo feather as a bookmark, Martha asks to see a dodo in its natural habitat. The Doctor slots the feather into the TARDIS which ends up taking them to the Earth section of the Museum of the Last Ones (MOTLO) run by the sinister Eve. The Doctor also gives Martha an I-Spyder book which she regularly updates. Eve explains that the entire Universe is monitored and when a species gets down to only one, they are retrieved and placed in suspended animation within the museum. As several specimens have been going missing, the Doctor, Martha and the museum workers investigate, ultimately finding the thief to be a museum worker Frank, trying to make a profit. Frank is detained by Eve, who then also captures the Doctor since he is the Last of the Time Lords, while sending Martha off with another museum worker to retrieve another last one specimen. Upon discovering the Doctor frozen, Martha manages to free him and transport all the frozen animals back to their original destinations, only for the Doctor to reveal that since MOTLO doesn't possess time travel, they will be returned to present day earth. The Doctor and Martha head to Earth where they find the Dodo (which the Doctor dubs Dorothea) in a town, along with a sabre tooth tiger and dinosaurs, but soon discover multiples of the creatures in the town. Another MOTLO worker Tommy arrives to try to help but is injured by a sabre tooth tiger. Transported back to MOTLO, Martha gets help for Tommy before attempting to investigate, finding Frank in a secret lab before she is cornered by both Frank and Eve. On Earth, the Dodos seem to lay eggs which begin ticking. At MOTLO, Eve reveals that while Frank had been cloning the animals mainly to make a profit, she had realized that since planets ended all the time and species died, her collection would never be truly complete so she plans to have the clone dodos lay bomb eggs which when detonated would destroy the Earth and will then hold Martha in her collection as the last survivor of Earth. The Doctor returns to MOTLO, attempting to hold Eve at stalemate with a ticking Dodo egg, which fails. Upon being told the plan, the Doctor points out it wouldn't work as since the Universe is constantly expanding, by the time Eve finishes killing off one civilization, billions more will have already been created, meaning her collection can never be complete. Faced with this, Eve shoots herself, revealing herself to be an android, and the Doctor is able to disable the bombs from her. Attempting to find out Eve's codes so they can retrieve the displaced animals, the group is confronted by Frank who plans to use one Dodo egg to destroy MOTLO and escape with his cash. Dorothea manages to bury the egg in Frank's bag before he teleports away. Tommy reveals he knows Eve's password and the Doctor transports all the animals on MOTLO back to their original time periods. Dorothea is introduced to the Dodo clones which have remained behind and the Doctor advises the MOTLO workers to possibly document the creatures another way. Discovering another secret room, Martha and the Doctor find Eve's creator who reveals that he created Eve after he found his own world destroyed and she had misunderstood his desires to document lost species. Upon leaving MOTLO, Martha fills in the I-Spyder guide and receives her certificate.

== Audiobook ==
An abridged audio book was released in July 2007 by BBC Audiobooks and read by Freema Agyeman (Martha Jones in the television series).

What was not included in the abridged version is the I-Spyder e-book perhaps due to copyright issues with the real life I Spy books.

== See also ==
- Whoniverse
