= Jessica Harris (actress) =

English actress

- Born: 1981 (age 44–45); Halifax, West Yorkshire, England
- Occupation: Actress
- Years active: 1980s–present

Jessica Harris (born 1981) is an English actress.

== Background ==
Jessica Harris was born in Halifax, West Yorkshire, England to Miles and Jo Harris. She grew up in the nearby towns of Hebden Bridge and Heptonstall, and attended Calder High School in Mytholmroyd. She graduated from the Calderdale College in Halifax with a National Diploma in Performing Arts. She later attended the Arts Educational School in London on a scholarship.

== Career ==
Harris made her television debut in the late 1980s when she appeared in the children's educational series How We Used to Live, produced by Yorkshire Television. She later appeared in other Yorkshire series, such as Heartbeat.

She has had other major television roles in Linda Green (as Katy Green), Burn It (as Kelly) and Thieves Like Us (as Mel). On stage, she has appeared in Bottle Universe (October–November 2005, Bush Theatre), Wuthering Heights (York Theatre Royal, June 2007) and The Pornographer Diaries (Edinburgh, August 2007). In 2009, she played Desdemona in a national tour of Othello, opposite Lenny Henry. Her performance in Othello was praised by Kate Kellaway of The Observer, who described her as "charming".

Harris has appeared in the ITV police drama The Bill three times. She first appeared in 2002 as Karen Best, the sister of cast regular PC Gary Best. The role was a recurring one and she appeared in a number of episodes for a year. She next appeared in 2007 as an inmate who has an affair with a prison officer. Harris's most recent role in the series came in 2009 when she appeared as Kathy Merrill, a sister of murder victim.

== Television ==
Year	Title	Role	Other notes
1995	Heartbeat	Vicki	1 episode: "Sophie's Choice"
1998	Heartbeat	Maureen Dodds	1 episode: "Love Me Do"
1998	The Broker's Man	Jane	1 episode: "Kith and Kin"
2000	Cold Feet	Student Two	1 episode: Series 3, Episode 2
2000	Fat Friends	Joanne Simpson	Recurring role
2001	Peak Practice	Teri	1 episode: Series 12, Episode 1
2001	Linda Green	Katy Green	Recurring role, 9 episodes, 2001–2002
2002	Holby City	Kate McIntyre	1 episode: "The Love That Binds"
2002	Sparkhouse	Tessa Gillespie	
2002	The Bill	Karen Best	4 episodes, 2002–2003
2003	Heartbeat	Kelley	1 episode: "The High Life"
2003	Burn It	Kelly	Main cast member
2004	The Royal	Shirley Baird	1 episode: "Hold on Tight"
2004	Doctors	Jess Simons	1 episode: "Run Baby Run"
2004	Conviction	Hayley Bryant	1 episode: Series 1, Episode 3
2006	Holby City	Kerry Peters	2 episodes: "I Am Not What I Am" and "Conscience"
2006	Wire in the Blood	Sally Hayter	1 episode: "Time to Murder and Create"
2006	Doctors	Katrina Thompson	1 episode: "Year of the Rat"
2006	Strictly Confidential	Vicky Melton	1 episode: Episode 3
2007	The Bill	Evie Barnes	1 episode
2007	Thieves Like Us	Mel	Recurring role
2009	Being Human	Becca	1 episode: Series 1, Episode 1
2009	The Inbetweeners	Michelle	1 episode: "Will's Birthday"
2009	Heartbeat	Ruthie Abbott	1 episode: "Cashing In"
2009	The Bill	Kathy Merrill	1 episode: "Twist of Fate"
2012	Starlings	Katie	Recurring role

== Theatre ==
Year	Title	Role	Director	Performance history
2005	Bottle Universe	Lauren	Sue Dunderdale	Bush Theatre, 12 October–12 November 2005
2006	Billy Liar	Rita	Phil Wilmott	Made in Liverpool/Liverpool Playhouse, 3–25 February 2006
2007	Cocoa	Girl	Chris White	Theatre 503, 20 April–5 May 2007
2007	Wuthering Heights	Catherine Earnshaw/Linton	Sue Dunderdale	Theatre Royal, York, 2–23 June 2007
2007	The Pornographer Diaries	Female roles	Kate McCarthy	Have a Word Productions/C venues, Edinburgh Festival, 1–27 August 2007.
2008	Harper Regan	Justine Ross	Marianne Elliott	National/Cottesloe Theatre, 16 April–9 August 2008
2009	Othello	Desdemona	Barrie Rutter	West Yorkshire Playhouse, national tour, February–December 2009.
