= Gary Beadle =

British actor (born 1965)

- Born: 8 July 1965 (age 61); Bermondsey, London, England
- Occupation: Actor
- Years active: 1980–present
- Spouse: Tanya Findel-Hawkins (m. 2003; div. 2014)
- Children: 2
- Parent: Monica Beadle
- Relatives: Rikki Beadle-Blair (brother); Louis Rae (son)

Gary Beadle (born 8 July 1965) is a British actor.

== Life and career ==
Beadle was raised as one of five children in Bermondsey, South London, England, where he was baptised a Roman Catholic. As children, he and his elder brother Rikki produced a version of the 1976 youth musical-gangster film Bugsy Malone for Southwark London Borough Council. Directed by Rikki who starred as Talula, Gary played janitor Fizzy. Rikki tried to invite the original film's director Alan Parker to the performance, but his assistant did come, and used her connections to get Rikki, Gary and their younger sister into the community-based Anna Scher Theatre School.

After developing a love of hip hop, and especially Run-D.M.C. and the Sugarhill Gang, Beadle moved to New York City in his early twenties. On his return to London, using the moniker "Pretty Boy Gee", he formed a rap group called The City Limits Crew alongside "Little Stevie Bee". In 1985, the duo released two 12" singles, "Keep It On" (w/ "The Mutant Rockers") and "Fresher Than Ever" on the independent record label Survival Records. Also that year, the crew recorded a session on BBC Radio 1 for John Peel and performed at Electro Rock, an international hip hop event at the Hippodrome.

He also worked as a comedian but started to work as an actor, and appeared in The Young Ones (BBC 1984); the 1986 film Absolute Beginners; Jerusalem, the 1987 short film starring the Style Council pop group; Making Out in 1989–91 as Simon; the BBC sitcom Absolutely Fabulous, where he played the gay lover of Eddie's (Jennifer Saunders) ex-husband Justin; the TV series Born to Run in 1997; the ITV police drama The Bill and BBC medical drama Casualty (2001).

In 2001, he started in the role of Paul Trueman in EastEnders. A loveable rogue, Beadle left the role when his contract was due to terminate - as he had not appreciated the director and script writers wanting his character to become a drug dealer. He therefore departed from the show and his exit featured the character being killed off by his gangland boss Andy Hunter (Michael Higgs).

Immediately after completing filming of EastEnders, Beadle playing the Evil Queen's henchman in the Qdos Entertainment production of Snow White at the Cliffs Pavilion in Southend-on-Sea, opposite Linda Lusardi. Since leaving EastEnders, Beadle has had roles in Holby City (2005), Doctors (2006) and the Jean-Claude Van Damme film Until Death, released in 2007.

In 2007, he appeared in BBC Three comedy Thieves Like Us. In 2008, he appeared in The Sarah Jane Adventures series 2 as Clyde Langer's father, Paul. In 2009, he appeared in Malice in Wonderland as DJ Felix Chester, a Cheshire Cat allusion. In 2010, he appeared in the Royal Court Theatre's Sucker Punch by Roy Williams.

In 2012, he appeared in Hustle as a police officer. In 2015, he played Docker in BBC One drama The Interceptor and also featured in the Ron Howard-directed film In the Heart of the Sea, which was released in December 2015.

In 2016, he performed as Abioseh, an ex-tribesman in the Royal National Theatre's production of Les Blancs. He also starred as a Detective Chief Inspector in an episode of Silent Witness.

In 2017, Beadle appeared as Archdeacon Gabriel Atubo, Rev. Sidney Chambers's boss in series 3 of Grantchester.

== Filmography ==
=== Film ===
Year	Film	Role	Notes
1986	Absolute Beginners	Johnny Wonder	
1986	Playing Away	Errol	
1987	White Mischief	African Servant	
1996	The Imitators	Rock	
1998	Written in Blood	Phill Hatton	
2007	Until Death	Mac	
2009	Malice in Wonderland	Felix Chester	
2010	Fit	Karmel's Dad	
2011	Bashment	The MC	
2012	Cockneys vs Zombies	Greg	
2015	In the Heart of the Sea	William Bond	
2017	Hip Hop Cafe	Hov	Short film
2019	We Die Young	Winslow	
2020	Squall	Ben	Short film
2021	The Toll	Elton	
2021	Demon	David	
2021	Blank Shores	Lenny	Short film
2021	Iniquity	Rhys	Short film
2022	Persuasion	Mr. Musgrove	
2022	Suppression	John Burns	Short film
2023	Rye Lane	Peter	
2023	Nandor Fodor and the Talking Mongoose	Errol	
2023	My Jerome	Ruddy	Short film
2024	Opening Up	Adam	Short film
2024	Hard Truths	Irate Motorist	

=== Television ===
Year	Film	Role	Notes
1980	The Squad	Gary	Episode: "Wheels"
1981	Theatre Box	Fergus	Episode: "Death Angel"
1982	Grange Hill	Elroy	Episode #5.13
1982	Murphy's Mob	Gonk	12 episodes
1983	Play for Today	Victor	Episode: "Shall I Be Mother?"
1984	The Young Ones	First Mate	Episode: "Time"
1984	The Lenny Henry Show	Various characters	Episode #1.3
1984	Stars of the Roller State Disco	Derek	Television film
1985	Relative Strangers	Steve	Episode #1.9
1985	Just Like Mohicans	Barrington	Television film
1985	Honeymoon	Denver	Television film
1987, 2001, 2010	Casualty	Denny / Steven Harris / Dom	3 episodes
1988	Scene	Paul	Episode: "QPR Askey Is Dead"
1988	Blind Justice	Boy on Train	Episode: "White Man Listen"
1989–1991	Making Out	Simon	19 episodes
1990	I Love Keith Allen	Various roles	
1990	ScreenPlay	Darren	Episode: "Night Voice"
1990–2011	The Comic Strip Presents...	Various characters	9 episodes
1992	Wail of the Banshee	Gary Galahad	Episode: "The Stone Round the Sword"
1992, 1995–1996	Absolutely Fabulous	Oliver	3 episodes
1995	The Detectives	Uniformed Constable	Episode: "Flash"
1995	The Glam Metal Detectives	Gary / Various roles / King	5 episodes
1995	Numbertime	Terry / Bobby Cube / Sammy Shape	5 episodes
1996	Thief Takers	John Boyd	Episode: "Going Under"
1997	Born to Run	Muff Muffin	4 episodes
1997–1999	Operation Good Guys	Gary Barwick	9 episodes
1998	Lost Souls	Stuart Markle	Television film
1999	The Bill	P.C. Banster	Episode: "A Day to Remember"
2001	Wit	Code Team Blue 6	Television film
2001	The Big Impression	Paul Trueman	Episode: "Christmas Special 2001"
2001–2004	EastEnders	Paul Trueman	375 episodes
2005	The First Black Britons	Presenter	Television film
2005, 2018	Holby City	Tim Webster / Lennox 'Lennie' Jefferies	2 episodes
2006, 2009, 2014	Doctors	Sean Patterson / PC Wilson / Eugene Montgomery	5 episodes
2007	Thieves Like Us	DS Haynes	4 episodes
2008	The Sarah Jane Adventures	Paul Langer	2 episodes
2012	Hustle	Nick	Episode: "The Con Is Off"
2012	Crime Stories	David Green	Episode #1.19
2013	Common Ground	John Kettle	Episode: "Patricia"
2015	The Interceptor	Docker	7 episodes
2017	Death in Paradise	Samuel Palmer	Episode: "The Impossible Murder"
2017	Silent Witness	DCI Tony Underhill	2 episodes
2017–2021	Grantchester	Archdeacon Gabriel Atubo	9 episodes
2018	Patrick Melrose	Chilly Willy	2 episodes
2019	Hatton Garden	Shorty	Episode #1.4
2019	Summer of Rockets	Courtney Johnson	6 episodes
2019	Dark Money	Malcolm Danvers	Episode: "Shattered Dreams"
2020	Mangrove	Dol Isaacs	Part of the Small Axe anthology series
2021	Around the World in 80 Days	Bass Reeves	Episode #1.7
2022	Skint	Gary	Episode: "Regeneration"
2022	Andor	Clem Andor	3 episodes
2022	Plebs: Soldiers of Rome	Actaeon	Television film
2022	Midsomer Murders	Damian Bennett	Episode: "The Debt of Lies"
2023	Best Interests	Frank	3 episodes
2023	The Wheel of Time	Elyas Machera	5 episodes
2024	The Gentlemen	Thick Rick	3 episodes
2024	A Good Girl's Guide to Murder	Victor Amobi	6 episodes
2026	Babies	Kevin	3 episodes
