= Wild Bill (2011 film) =

2011 British film directed by Dexter Fletcher

- Theatrical release poster
- Directed by: Dexter Fletcher
- Written by: Dexter Fletcher; Danny King
- Produced by: Tim Cole; Sam Tromans
- Starring: Charlie Creed-Miles; Will Poulter; Liz White; Sammy Williams; Charlotte Spencer; Leo Gregory; Neil Maskell; Iwan Rheon; Jason Flemyng; Jaime Winstone; Olivia Williams; Andy Serkis
- Cinematography: George Richmond
- Edited by: Stuart Gazzard
- Music by: Christian Henson
- Production companies: Three Mills Studios; 20ten Media
- Distributed by: Universal indiVISION; The Works
- Release dates: 21 October 2011 (London Film Festival); 23 March 2012 (United Kingdom)
- Running time: 98 minutes
- Country: United Kingdom
- Language: English
- Budget: £700,000
- Box office: $194,099

Wild Bill is a 2011 British crime comedy drama film directed by Dexter Fletcher and starring Charlie Creed-Miles and Andy Serkis. It was released in UK cinemas on 23 March 2012.

== Plot ==
Bill is paroled after serving an eight year prison sentence for drug related offences. Returning to his home in East London, Bill finds his two sons, 15-year-old Dean and 11-year-old Jimmy abandoned by their mother, Dean having dropped out of school to work and take care of Jimmy on his own. Dean makes it clear to Bill that he is not welcome in either his or Jimmy's lives. Bill's former criminal associates Dickie and Terry offer Bill some drug dealing. Bill is on licence and refuses, not wanting to return to prison, instead intending to go to Scotland and work on the oil rigs. During a parole meeting Bill finds out that his sons, under aged and without a legal guardian will be surrendered to foster care, but is reluctant to take on fatherly duty. Dean reveals that he has confiscated his drugs and threatens to tell the police if Bill does not stay.

Despite the number of challenges ahead of him, such as restraining Jimmy's delinquent behaviour, Bill is able to find legal work and bond with Jimmy. Jimmy has a tendency to abscond from school to be a drug mule for Pill. Glen's brother Terry, threatens to undo Bill's progress. After nearly being caught, Jimmy disposes of the drugs to avoid arrest, but this puts him in a bad position with Terry. Dean visits his love interest Steph where the two nearly have sex before her father unexpectedly comes home. Jimmy, who had followed Dean to Steph's home, steals a large amount of cash from the kitchen to help pay off Terry. Terry demands Jimmy work off the remaining balance, threatening to burn down his flat if he does not.

When Steph recognizes the theft she immediately blames Dean, who in turn surmises that it was Jimmy. Roxy who is one of Terry's prostitutes, confides in Bill that Jimmy is working for Terry. Bill confronts Jimmy and warns him that he will end up in prison, if he continues down the path he is on. Bill returns to Steph's home with the stolen money, who in turn returns to make amends and reconcile with Dean. Terry demands that Bill meet him at a local pub; Bill rationalising that in returning the drugs Jimmy had on him he can relinquish Jimmy from Terry's control. Terry has other intentions, including never releasing Jimmy from his obligations as well as killing Bill for his reluctance to leave. Bill uses violence against Terry and his goons, in a showdown.

Returning home with Jimmy, Bill is intercepted by Glen. Bill reaffirms his commitment to his honest and law-abiding life, though his earlier fight obviously violates his conditions of parole. Knowing he will be sent back to prison, Dean, Roxy, Steph and Jimmy see him off; Dean promising that he is welcome back when he returns. Inside the police car, Bill asks the officer if he has children as he wells up. Bill then begins to smile and laugh, remaining optimistic about his eventual return this time.

== Cast ==
- Charlie Creed-Miles as Wild Bill
- Will Poulter as Dean
- Sammy Williams as Jimmy
- Liz White as Roxy
- Neil Maskell as Dickie
- Leo Gregory as Terry
- Iwan Rheon as Pill
- Charlotte Spencer as Steph
- Morgan Watkins as Viktoras
- Andy Serkis as Glen
- Sean Pertwee as Jack (Policeman)
- Rad Kaim as Jonas
- Aaron Ishmael as Boz
- Hardeep Singh Kohli as Raj
- Mark Monero as Freddy
- Peter-Hugo Daly as Keith
- Olivia Williams as Kelly
- Jaime Winstone as Helen
- Elly Fairman as Miss Treedley
- Graham Fletcher-Cook as Policeman
- Lee Whitlock as Boss
- Billy Holland as Mini Hoodie
- Dexter Fletcher as Mysterious Barry

== Production ==
The film was shot primarily in the East End of London. Fletcher cites directors such as Emir Kusturica, Franklin Schaffner, Gerard Johnson and films like Black Cat, White Cat, Tony and Underground as influences.

== Reception ==
Wild Bill scored a perfect 100% score on Rotten Tomatoes, based on 24 reviews.
