= BBC Books =

British publisher

- BBC Books logo
- Parent company: Penguin Random House; BBC Studios
- Country of origin: United Kingdom
- Headquarters location: London
- Publication types: Books
- Official website: www.eburypublishing.co.uk/bbcbooks.asp

BBC Books (also formerly known as BBC Consumer Publishing and BBC Publishing) is an imprint majority-owned and managed by Penguin Random House through its Ebury Publishing division. The minority shareholder is BBC Studios, the commercial subsidiary of the British Broadcasting Corporation. The imprint has been active since the 1980s.

BBC Books publishes a range of books connected to BBC radio and television programming, including cookery, natural history, lifestyle, and behind the scenes "making-of" books. There are also some non-programme related biographies and autobiographies of various well-known personalities in its list.

Amongst BBC Books' best known titles are cookery books by former TV cook Delia Smith, wildlife titles by Sir David Attenborough and gardening titles by Alan Titchmarsh. In the BBC Publishing days, it turned down The Hitchhiker's Guide to the Galaxy, a book which has now sold over 14,000,000 copies worldwide.

== Doctor Who ==
Since 1996, BBC Books has also produced a range of tie-in novels connected to the television science-fiction series Doctor Who, the only full-length fiction to be printed by the company. Their first release related to the series was a novelisation of the 1996 Doctor Who telemovie published in the spring of 1996. Then, in 1997, BBC Books launched two concurrent series of books, the Eighth Doctor Adventures (EDA) (featuring the then-current incarnation of the Doctor), and the Past Doctor Adventures (PDA), featuring the seven previous incarnations. Between 1997 and 2005 approximately 150 original novels were published for both lines, combined. BBC Books also launched a short-lived line of Doctor Who-related short story collections called Short Trips; Big Finish Productions later obtained the rights to publish the Short Trips books and that series continues as of 2010.

In 2005, BBC Books began to phase out the EDA and PDA lines as it launched a new series of books (informally dubbed the New Series Adventures) based upon the newly revived television series. Featuring the Ninth Doctor, the new books were published in hardback (as opposed to the EDA, PDA and Short Trips lines that were exclusively paperback releases). The Eighth Doctor line was discontinued during the summer of 2005, followed by the final Past Doctor Adventure in November. Beginning in 2006, BBC Books continued the New Series Adventures, now featuring the Tenth Doctor, with no word (as of September 2009) whether any more Past Doctor Adventures are planned. The books continue to be published in hardback, with the exception of four novellas, I Am a Dalek, Made of Steel, Revenge of the Judoon and Code of the Krillitanes, which are paperback releases under a series called Quick Reads. The 4th novella still featured the tenth doctor David Tennant, even though the eleventh has made his TV appearance.

In January 2007, BBC Books launched a new line of original novels based upon the Doctor Who spin-off series, Torchwood. These books are also being published exclusively in hardcover and, like the TV series itself, are aimed at an older audience.

In May 2008, BBC Books issued its first original made-for-audio Doctor Who adventure, Pest Control, which was released as part of the Tenth Doctor Adventures line and read by David Tennant. The Audiobook of the Year 2010 was a Tenth Doctor adventure called Dead Air by James Goss and read by David Tennant.

== Being Human ==
In 2010, a series of three Being Human novels were published by BBC Books. These novels describe the adventures of the three main characters Annie Sawyer, George Sands and John Mitchell of the BBC Three television series Being Human and are written by Simon Guerrier, Mark Michalowski and James Goss. All novels were also released as audiobooks. The Road was read by Lenora Crichlow, Chasers by Russell Tovey and Bad Blood by Lucy Gaskell.

== New ownership ==
In 2006, the Ebury Publishing division of Random House acquired a majority shareholding in BBC Books.

== Sherlock Holmes ==
In 2011, BBC Books launched a publishing programme around BAFTA-winning TV series, Sherlock, which was inspired by the adventures of Arthur Conan Doyle's Victorian detective Sherlock Holmes. The titles will each feature the show's branding and introductions by key members of the Sherlock team, including co-founders Steven Moffat and Mark Gatiss.

The first title, Arthur Conan Doyle's Sherlock: A Study in Scarlet, with an introduction by Steven Moffat was released on 15 September 2011. Arthur Conan Doyle's Sherlock: The Adventures of Sherlock Holmes, with an introduction by Mark Gatiss, followed on 27 October 2011.

Three books Sherlock: Sign of Four, Sherlock: The Memoirs of Sherlock Holmes and Sherlock: The Hound of the Baskervilles with introductions by Martin Freeman, Steve Thompson and Benedict Cumberbatch were released on 29 March 2012.

In autumn 2012, BBC Books published Sherlock: The Casebook as a hardback gift guide, revisiting all the mysteries solved throughout the TV series.
