= The Mark of the Berserker =

2008 Sarah Jane Adventures story

10 – The Mark of the Berserker
- The Sarah Jane Adventures story

Cast
- Starring: Elisabeth Sladen – Sarah Jane Smith; Tommy Knight – Luke Smith; Daniel Anthony – Clyde Langer; Anjli Mohindra – Rani Chandra; Alexander Armstrong – Mr Smith
- Others: Ace Bhatti – Haresh Chandra; Jocelyn Jee Esien – Carla Langer; Gary Beadle – Paul Langer; Perry Millward – Jacob; Huw Higginson – Mr Cunningham; Elijah Baker – Steve Wallace; Jessica Lewis – Detention Girl; Andrew Phillips – Detention Boy; Yasmin Paige – Maria Jackson; Joseph Millson – Alan Jackson; Prasanna Puwanarajah – Car Salesman

Production
- Directed by: Joss Agnew
- Written by: Joseph Lidster
- Script editor: Gary Russell
- Produced by: Nikki Smith
- Executive producers: Russell T Davies; Julie Gardner
- Music by: Sam Watts
- Production code: 2.7 and 2.8
- Series: Series 2
- Running time: 2 episodes, 25 minutes each
- First broadcast: 3 November 2008
- Last broadcast: 10 November 2008

Chronology
| ← Preceded by Secrets of the Stars | Followed by → The Temptation of Sarah Jane Smith |

The Mark of the Berserker is the fourth serial of the second series of the British science fiction television series The Sarah Jane Adventures. It was first broadcast in two weekly parts on CBBC on 3 and 10 November 2008. Due to Elisabeth Sladen's commitments elsewhere, main character Sarah Jane Smith has a minor role in this serial, making the episodes similar to the 'Doctor-lite' episodes of Doctor Who ("Love & Monsters", "Blink" and “Turn Left") which do not feature The Doctor heavily, as well as the Torchwood episode "Random Shoes", which had minor roles for most of the main cast.

== Plot ==
Jacob, an unpopular pupil at school, finds an alien pendant. He begins using it to control other people, while leaving a strange blue handmark on his palm. Rani finds the pendant in the school bathroom and, upon learning its effects, leaves it in Sarah Jane's attic.

Meanwhile, Clyde's father Paul returns to Clyde's house, years after leaving his family for Clyde's aunt in Germany. Clyde takes Paul to the attic to prove he fights aliens. Paul pockets the pendant, and uses it to force Rani's father Haresh to do push ups indefinitely. When Luke and Rani turn up, Paul uses the pendant to make Clyde forget about Luke, Rani, and Clyde's mother Carla, and the two drive off to travel the world. Paul uses the pendant to steal expensive objects to bond with Clyde.

Luke and Rani contact Maria and her father, Alan in Washington, D. C. and they hack into UNIT's database to find a match of a drawing of the pendant Luke and Rani send to them. They discover that the pendant belongs to a race of alien warriors known as the Berserkers, and that using the pendant can change the user into one of them, including marking their hands and turning their veins blue.

Luke, Rani, Carla, and Sarah Jane (who Alan tracked down by hacking into hospital records) follow Clyde and Paul to the marina. The pendant begins to possess Paul and transform him into a Berserker, and Paul declares that he and Clyde will fight in a war. Clyde and Carla talk Paul through his memories, whilst Sarah Jane shows him a reflection of himself in the mirror, and he remembers who he is. Everyone whom the pendant commanded has their commands undone. Paul returns to Germany to raise his unborn child. Clyde tells Carla to forget about what she knows about Sarah Jane's adventures with her son. Clyde throws the pendant into the sea.
