= Whatever Happened to Sarah Jane? =

2007 Sarah Jane Adventures story

05 – Whatever Happened to Sarah Jane?
- The Sarah Jane Adventures story
- The Trickster meeting Sarah Jane

Cast
- Starring: Elisabeth Sladen – Sarah Jane Smith; Yasmin Paige – Maria Jackson; Tommy Knight – Luke Smith; Daniel Anthony – Clyde Langer; Alexander Armstrong – Mr Smith
- Others: Joseph Millson – Alan Jackson; Juliet Cowan – Chrissie Jackson; Jane Asher – Andrea; Jimmy Vee – The Graske; Paul Marc Davis – The Trickster; Jessica Ashworth – Young Sarah Jane; Francesca Miller – Young Andrea; Jason Mohammad – Newsreader; Philip Hurd-Wood – Voice of The Graske

Production
- Directed by: Graeme Harper
- Written by: Gareth Roberts
- Script editor: Lindsey Alford
- Produced by: Matthew Bouch
- Executive producers: Phil Collinson; Russell T Davies; Julie Gardner
- Music by: Sam Watts
- Production code: 1.7 and 1.8
- Series: Series 1
- Running time: 2 episodes, 25 minutes each
- First broadcast: 29 October 2007
- Last broadcast: 5 November 2007

Chronology
← Preceded by Warriors of Kudlak	Followed by → The Lost Boy

Whatever Happened to Sarah Jane? is the fourth serial of the first series of the British science fiction television series The Sarah Jane Adventures. It first aired on the CBBC channel on 29 October and 5 November 2007.

== Plot ==
Sarah Jane receives a puzzle box from a Verron soothsayer, with the instruction to give it to the person she trusts the most. She gives the puzzle box to Maria. A meteor is on a collision course with Earth, and Sarah Jane has set up, but not yet activated via Mr Smith, a force field to deflect the meteor. The next morning, Maria wakes to find that Sarah Jane and Luke have gone missing, but no one besides Maria knows who Sarah Jane or Luke are. A woman called Andrea Yates has apparently taken Sarah Jane's place. Andrea was present when Sarah Jane fell off a pier to her death at age 13. Maria goes to Andrea to talk to her about this, but when Andrea gets reminded of it, she panics and angrily evicts Maria from "her" house. Maria vows that she will do anything necessary to bring Sarah Jane back. Andrea rushes to her attic, where she takes out a second puzzle box.

It is revealed that Andrea was originally the one who fell off the pier, but as she was about to fall, she made a deal with a hooded figure called The Trickster to switch places with Sarah Jane; she had forgotten the Trickster until the present. Unknown to Andrea, the Trickster removed Sarah Jane from Earth's timeline so that the incoming meteor would destroy it and create the chaos on which he feeds. In the present, Andrea accepts another deal from the Trickster to make Maria disappear. The Trickster dispatches a Graske, who captures Maria just after her father, Alan, picks up the first puzzle box. Subsequently, no one besides Alan can remember Maria.

Remembering Maria's suspicions, Alan questions Andrea at her birthday party, who takes him to the attic and reveals the truth. Alan is chased into the street by the Graske but he knocks him down, then uses his device to bring back Maria, though Sarah Jane is still not back. They return to the attic, where Sarah Jane appears in the mirror and explains to Andrea that witnessing her death caused tremendous pain for her and gave her the resolve to fight pointless deaths herself. Andrea revokes her deal with the Trickster, causing her to fall off the pier to her death when she was 13. Sarah Jane and Luke reappear in the attic in the present and activate Mr Smith to divert the falling meteor. Alan demands an explanation of Maria's involvement with aliens and supercomputers.

=== Continuity ===
- The Graske also featured in the interactive episode of Doctor Who, "Attack of the Graske". Sarah Jane states that there was Graske activity on Earth a couple of years ago, possibly referring to that episode.
- Sarah mentions previous times she saved the Earth and thwarted alien invasions, including the Bane ("Invasion of the Bane"), the Slitheen (Revenge of the Slitheen) and the Gorgons (Eye of the Gorgon). She also mentions that she helped defeat the Patriarchs of the Tin Vagabond. The Church of the Tin Vagabond was previously mentioned in the 2006 Doctor Who episode, "The Satan Pit".
- The Trickster threatens the Doctor when in limbo. This is the second time that the Doctor has been explicitly named in the series, the first being in Revenge of the Slitheen. The Trickster makes good on this threat in the Doctor Who episode "Turn Left", when a creature from "[his] brigade" assaults Donna Noble.
- Sarah Jane's address is identified as 13 Bannerman Road, as it is throughout the later series; it had been 21 Bannerman Road in the preceding two serials, yet the sign on the brick wall next to the Smiths' driveway still says 21.

== Outside references ==
- When questioned about Maria, Andrea mentions "Ave Maria" and Maria Callas.
- The fictional Triffids are mentioned.
- When Maria is on the Internet on her laptop, she goes on bebo.

== Cast notes ==
- Jane Asher previously portrayed the Doctor's granddaughter Susan Foreman in the 1994 Radio 4 spoof Whatever Happened to Susan Foreman.
- Paul Marc Davis previously appeared as the Futurekind Chieftain in the Doctor Who 2007 episode "Utopia", and later as the Cowled Leader in the 2008 Torchwood episode "Exit Wounds" and Corakinus, the king of the Shadow Kin in Class.

== Reception ==
The story received several positive reviews. Mark Wright, writing on The Stage's "TV Today" blog, stated that the series, while usually "wholly satisfying and entertaining", "achieves true greatness" with the first part of Whatever Happened to Sarah Jane? He called the episode "scary as hell ... but with that essential lightness of touch that has typified the show from the start". Alisdair Stuart praised the acting of Jane Asher, Joseph Millson and Yasmin Paige; he regarded Paige's prominence as compensating for her relative lack of screen time in Warriors of Kudlak. Stuart summed up Whatever Happened to Sarah Jane? as "the darkest, most ambitious and most effective Sarah Jane story to date" and "one of the best New Who stories to date". Andrea Mullaney in The Scotsman also commended the "young actors", while calling attention to a "gentle theme" in the story of "ageing and what we leave behind".

The second part of the story received the most viewers of any programme ever broadcast on the CBBC Channel.

== Novelisation ==
Whatever Happened to Sarah Jane?
- Author: Rupert Laight
- Series: The Sarah Jane Adventures #5
- Published: 2008 (Penguin Books)
- Pages: 128
- ISBN: 1-405-90507-7
- Preceded by: Warriors of Kudlak
- Followed by: The Lost Boy

This was the fifth of eleven Sarah Jane Adventures serials to be adapted as a novel. Written by Rupert Laight, the book was first published in paperback on 6 November 2008.
