= Eye of the Gorgon =

2007 Sarah Jane Adventures story

03 – Eye of the Gorgon
- The Sarah Jane Adventures story
- The Gorgon turning Maria's father, Alan, to stone

Cast
- Starring: Elisabeth Sladen – Sarah Jane Smith; Yasmin Paige – Maria Jackson; Tommy Knight – Luke Smith; Daniel Anthony – Clyde Langer; Alexander Armstrong – Mr Smith
- Others: Joseph Millson – Alan Jackson; Juliet Cowan – Chrissie Jackson; Phyllida Law – Bea Nelson-Stanley; Sarah Crowden – Mrs Gribbins; Doreen Mantle – Mrs Randall; Beth Goddard – Sister Helena; Audrey Ardington – The Abbess

Production
- Directed by: Alice Troughton
- Written by: Phil Ford
- Script editor: Lindsey Alford
- Produced by: Matthew Bouch
- Executive producers: Phil Collinson; Russell T Davies; Julie Gardner
- Music by: Sam Watts
- Production code: 1.3 and 1.4
- Series: Series 1
- Running time: 2 episodes, 25 minutes each
- First broadcast: 1 October 2007
- Last broadcast: 8 October 2007

Chronology
| ← Preceded by Revenge of the Slitheen | Followed by → Warriors of Kudlak |

Eye of the Gorgon is the second serial of the first series of the British science fiction television series The Sarah Jane Adventures. It first aired in two weekly parts on the CBBC channel on 1 and 8 October 2007. The episode makes references to classical mythology.

== Plot ==
Sarah Jane, Luke Smith, and Clyde investigate claims of sightings of a ghostly nun at Lavender Lawns Rest Home. One of the residents that saw the nun, former adventurer Bea Nelson-Stanley, gives Luke an ancient talisman, to prevent the ancient sisterhood now based at the St Agnes Abbey from getting hold of it. The sisters intend to use the talisman to connect Earth with the world of the Gorgons 100 million light-years away, an incorporeal parasitic race that inspired the Greek myth of the ugly woman with snakes for hairs, and take over the bodies of humanity. The Gorgon, the last survivor of the three based on Earth, has spent 3,000 years passing from host to host, and now controls the body of the abbess of the abbey. Because of Bea's advanced age and Alzheimer's disease, she fails to explain to Luke who is after the talisman.

After the talisman is brought to her house, Sarah Jane brings Maria along to speak to Bea. According to Bea, her archaeologist husband Edgar unearthed the talisman decades ago. Bea warns them that the nuns are protecting the Gorgon. Meanwhile, when Luke and Clyde refuse to give the talisman to the nuns, the nuns hold them hostage at the abbey until Sarah Jane gives them the talisman. The nuns take the talisman by force, and the Gorgon turns Maria's dad Alan to stone as he enters Sarah Jane's house, though it will take 90 minutes until the effect is permanent.

As the process to connect Earth with the Gorgon world begins, the Gorgon chooses Sarah Jane as its next host. Chatting with Bea, Maria discovers that the talisman can revert those turned to stone to flesh and blood. Bea gives Maria a mirror, which she uses at the abbey to revert the transfer and turn the Gorgon and its host body to stone, freeing the nuns of mind control. Maria disconnects the talisman and the portal shuts down forever. The talisman brings Alan back to flesh and blood.

== Continuity ==
- When Sarah Jane Smith and Bea Nelson-Stanley discuss aliens, Sontarans are mentioned. The two women agree that they resemble potatoes, and that they were "the silliest race in the galaxy". Sarah Jane met the Sontarans in The Time Warrior and The Sontaran Experiment. Another character compares a Sontaran to a potato in "The Sontaran Stratagem". A lone Sontaran appeared later in The Sarah Jane Adventures second series stories The Last Sontaran and Enemy of the Bane. Sarah Jane and the Sontarans were both introduced in The Time Warrior.
- When Sarah Jane and Mr Smith discuss hauntings, the explanation they give Clyde matches the explanation given in the Torchwood episode "Ghost Machine". The idea of "residual haunting" is also known as the "Stone Tape theory", named after the 1972 BBC television play The Stone Tape by Nigel Kneale, which popularised the theory. The theory also appears in the Doctor Who Past Doctor Adventures novel The Eleventh Tiger.
- Bea mentions the Yeti.
- Sarah Jane mentions Agatha Christie, whom the Doctor and Donna Noble meet in "The Unicorn and the Wasp".
- The Gorgons were first mentioned in the Torchwood episode "Random Shoes". The fictional Gorgon Medusa appeared in the 1968 Doctor Who serial The Mind Robber.
- In the Torchwood novel Trace Memory, an explorer by the name of Nelson-Stanley (who may be Edgar Nelson-Stanley) is alluded to.
- Clyde predicts that in the future, he will be able to have his brain transplanted into a metal body so that he can live forever, unwittingly referring to the Cybermen.
- In "Random Shoes", Eugene Jones has a piece of what he believes to be pre-Gorgon currency in his collection of alleged alien artefacts.
- Chrissie Jackson's taxi had an advert on it for Henrik's – the store Rose worked at in the eponymous Doctor Who episode.

== Outside references ==
- Sister's Helena's line, "I'd shut up if I were you, or the Abbess will show you her idea of solving a problem like Maria", references both the song "Maria" from the musical The Sound of Music and the BBC talent show How Do You Solve a Problem Like Maria?, on which John Barrowman, the actor who portrayed Jack Harkness, Head of Torchwood 3 and ex-companion of the Doctor's, was a judge.
- When Maria goes to see Bea to find out how to save her father, Bea begins playing the song 'Goodnight Sweetheart', which shares its name with another BBC time travel programme.

== Novelisation ==
Eye of the Gorgon
- Author: Phil Ford
- Series: The Sarah Jane Adventures #3
- Published: 1 November 2007; Penguin Books
- Pages: 128
- ISBN: 1-405-90399-6
- Preceded by: Revenge of the Slitheen
- Followed by: Warriors of Kudlak

This was the third of eleven Sarah Jane Adventures serials to be adapted as a novel. Written by Phil Ford, the book was first published in Paperback on 1 November 2007.
