= The Last Sontaran =

2008 Sarah Jane Adventures story

07 – The Last Sontaran
- The Sarah Jane Adventures story

Cast
- Starring: Elisabeth Sladen – Sarah Jane Smith; Yasmin Paige – Maria Jackson; Tommy Knight – Luke Smith; Daniel Anthony – Clyde Langer; Alexander Armstrong – Mr Smith
- Others: Joseph Millson – Alan Jackson; Juliet Cowan – Chrissie Jackson; Ronan Vibert – Professor Nicholas Skinner; Clare Thomas – Lucy Skinner; Anthony O'Donnell – Commander Kaagh

Production
- Directed by: Joss Agnew
- Written by: Phil Ford
- Script editor: Gary Russell
- Produced by: Nikki Smith
- Executive producers: Russell T Davies; Julie Gardner
- Music by: Sam Watts
- Production code: 2.1 and 2.2
- Series: Series 2
- Running time: 2 episodes, 25 minutes each
- First broadcast: 29 September 2008

Chronology
← Preceded by The Lost Boy	Followed by → The Day of the Clown

The Last Sontaran is the first serial of the second series of the British science fiction television series The Sarah Jane Adventures. The first part of the two-part story aired on BBC One on 29 September 2008, with the second part premiering immediately after the first on the CBBC channel. This serial marks the departure of Maria Jackson, played by Yasmin Paige.

== Plot ==
Sarah Jane, Maria, Luke, and Clyde investigate strange lights sighted near the village of Goblin's Copse, where a radio telescope observatory is located. When they discover Professor Nicholas Skinner, who runs the observatory, has gone missing in the woods, Luke and Clyde search for him. They discover Sontaran Commander Kaagh, the sole survivor of an invasion force involving the infiltration of Earth's cars that was otherwise destroyed, (Note: As depicted in the 2008 Doctor Who episode "The Poison Sky".) and his space pod. Sarah Jane and Maria gather at the pod, where Kaagh confesses he contrived the lights to draw the Professor out of the observatory.

Professor Skinner returns to the observatory on his own. Through an implant in his neck, Professor Skinner is working as Kaagh's drone to hack into every satellite orbiting Earth and target the planet's nuclear reactors, wiping out all life on Earth. Kaagh says this will make him an avenging hero for his fleet's failed campaign. In 45 minutes, a signal from the radio telescope will trigger the satellites' fall.

After receiving a phone call from his daughter Maria, Alan, secretly followed by his ex-wife Chrissie, asks for help from Mr Smith in Sarah Jane's attic. After overhearing the Sontarans' weakness from Mr Smith, Chrissie heads to the observatory, and knocks Kaagh unconscious by striking the high heel of her shoe into the back of his neck. Luke deactivates the computer Kaagh rigged to ground the satellites. With his ship's weapons deactivated, Kaagh leaves Earth in his space pod.

Six weeks later, Alan and Maria move to Washington, D.C. after Alan accepts a new job offer there.

=== Continuity ===
- Reference is made to the Bane seen in "Invasion of the Bane"; the Slitheen seen in Revenge of the Slitheen and The Lost Boy; the Gorgon and Alan's being turned to stone seen in Eye of the Gorgon; the Trickster and the alternate reality seen in Whatever Happened to Sarah Jane?; and the Xylok, the Moon coming towards Earth and the rebooting of Mr Smith as seen in The Lost Boy. Kaagh refers to The Doctor's victory over the Sontarans in Doctor Who two-part story "The Sontaran Strategem"/"The Poison Sky" and footage of the Sontaran mothership exploding is re-used from "The Poison Sky", marking the first time footage from Doctor Who has been used in The Sarah Jane Adventures, aside from the still images shown in "Invasion of the Bane" and The Lost Boy. Kaagh is shown to bleed green blood as other Sontarans have been shown to in Doctor Who. Sarah Jane refers to her past encounters with Sontarans, alongside the Third Doctor in Earth's relative past in Doctor Who serial The Time Warrior and alongside the Fourth Doctor and Harry Sullivan in Earth's relative future in Doctor Who serial The Sontaran Experiment. Clyde observes that Sontarans resemble baked potatoes, an observation also made by Sarah Jane and Bea Nelson-Stanley in Eye of the Gorgon, and by Private Ross Jenkins in The Sontaran Stratagem.
- Clyde and Luke re-enact the Battle of Waterloo in simulation. The Doctor referred to his defeat of the Sontarans in The Sontaran Experiment as "their Waterloo".
- Sarah Jane likens the empty observatory to the deserted ship Mary Celeste, the abandonment of which was depicted in The Chase as being the result of Daleks arriving aboard.
- Sarah Jane plans to call in military organisation UNIT to defeat Kaagh, but ultimately does not. UNIT battled the Tenth Sontaran Battle Fleet in "The Sontaran Strategem" and "The Poison Sky". Sarah Jane refers to the Sontarans' ongoing war with the Rutans.
- Stating "Some people never learn", Chrissie breaks into Sarah Jane's house through the same window she did in Eye of the Gorgon.
- As Maria enters the attic to take one last look around and to say goodbye to Mr Smith, she looks to her left and sees numerous alien objects Sarah Jane has collected, including; a bottle of Bubble Shock! seen in "Invasion of the Bane"; Mr Smith's Portable Scanner; a Sontaran gas canister and Kaagh's gun taken from Kaagh in this story; the MITRE headset seen in The Lost Boy; a puzzle box seen in Whatever Happened to Sarah Jane?; and entanglement shells seen in Warriors of Kudlak.

=== Outside references ===
Clyde and Luke refer to the Battle of Waterloo and the Battle of Hoth, the latter seen in The Empire Strikes Back (1980). Sarah Jane likens the empty observatory to deserted ship the Mary Celeste. Clyde likens Kaagh to Conan the Barbarian, calls him "Bilbo" and accuses him of having a "little man complex". When Sarah Jane asks Mr Smith if he has acquired a sense of humor since his reboot, he replies, "I will run a diagnostics check immediately" whilst playing the sound effect associated with the Book from the television adaptation of The Hitchhiker's Guide to the Galaxy. Chrissie refers to Sarah Jane as "Mary Jane" and "Calamity Jane". When Alan tries to convince Chrissie that Maria is playing an alternate reality game, Chrissie compares it to the time they spent "looking for a golden rabbit" when they were dating, referring to Kit Williams' Masquerade.

== Production ==
=== Writing ===
Speaking to Doctor Who Magazine, writer Phil Ford claims "we haven't seen a Sontaran like this before" and states the character "was just fantastic to write for". Ford thinks Kaagh is "the best Sontaran that we've ever seen in the Doctor Who world" and describes Anthony O'Donnell's performance as "fantastic...[making] an amazing Sontaran". The Jacksons were written out as regulars in The Sarah Jane Adventures because Yasmin Paige left the series in order to focus on her GCSEs.

== Broadcast and reception ==
=== Broadcast ===
"Part One" was first broadcast on BBC One at 4.35 p.m. on Monday 29 September 2008 and was repeated on the CBBC Channel at 5.00 p.m. on Saturday 4 October 2008. "Part Two" was first broadcast on the CBBC Channel at 5.15 p.m. on Monday 29 September 2008 and was repeated on BBC One at 4.35 p.m. on Monday 6 October 2008. Both episodes were made available for 21 days after first broadcast on the BBC iPlayer.

Overnight ratings for "Part One" of The Last Sontaran indicate that 0.7 million people (0.3 million above the average 0.4 million viewers for that time slot) watched the episode on BBC One on Monday 29 September 2008, earning it a 6.3 per cent share of the television audience. The Appreciation Index for the episode was 84 – the joint highest figure on BBC One on Monday 29 September 2008.

=== Critical reception ===
Ben Rawson-Jones, Cult Editor for Digital Spy, praises The Last Sontaran for its "emotional content", but notes that "Part Two" "disappoints in the action stakes" following "Part One". He argues that the title The Last Sontaran nullifies any potential suspense prior to the revelation of the Sontaran as the force behind the mysterious lights, but praises O'Donnell's performance as Kaagh as being largely responsible for making the Sontaran plot a success. He views Sarah Jane's reaction to Maria's news that she is leaving as "a fascinating departure from her usual maternal role to the children" and suggests this is a result of Sarah Jane having been abandoned by the Fourth Doctor at the end of Doctor Who serial The Hand of Fear. He claims Part Two has "[p]lenty of tension-free chase sequences function[ing] as meaningless padding and lessen[ing] the threat posed by Commander Kaagh", attributing the lack of tension to "inadequate direction." He brands Clyde and Luke as "dependable as ever" and the Jacksons as "endearing", the latter compensating "for [Part Two's] action failings" with Maria and Alan's departure being "well handled" and "touching" and Chrissie being "a revelation...[as] her seemingly vacuous nature has been replaced by an air of mystery." Although Rawson-Jones notes "the subplot featuring the Sontaran-controlled Professor stalking his own daughter Lucy is rather disturbing for a CBBC show that airs at 4.35pm", he describes the adventure as "[f]ittingly...death-free and surprisingly heartwarming." However, he laments "that this wonderful show is not being shown in a timeslot when the whole family could sit down to enjoy it together."

Writing for totalscifionline.com, Patrick Holm describes "Part One" as "Overall, a good start" but that "Some odd gaps in logic and excess runarounds make...["Part Two"] not as effective as it could have been." Holm expresses surprise at the lack of references to the "literally world-shaking events" of Doctor Who episode "Journey's End" which precedes this story chronologically and which saw a Dalek invasion of Earth and Sarah Jane, Luke and Mr Smith helping to defeat them and return Earth to its rightful place in space. However, he states Ford's script for "Part One" is "enjoyable" and praises its mixing of "old and new Who mythologies" with its many "other references back to the parent series [Doctor Who]". He also praises Ford for "giving the Sontarans a few new tricks" and notes that the effects in "Part One" indicate that the budget for The Sarah Jane Adventures has been increased. Whilst praising Knight and Langer for being "much more fluid in their movements", Holm does not share Rawson-Jones's appreciation for the emotional scenes in "Part One" regarding Maria's departure and claims they lack "the resonance you might expect." Holm does state, however, that "[t]he scenes regarding Maria’s departure are handled better...[in "Part Two"], even if some of the closing scene platitudes are a little vomit-inducing." He cites as examples of weaknesses in "Part Two"; the ease with which Kaagh is fooled by the children; and the incredible luck Clyde has when Sarah Jane and Luke happen to be on the other side of a locked door in order to let him in thus saving him from Kaagh. He is also critical of the reuse of the threat of "something being brought crashing down to Earth...an overused plot last season" and observes that an "end of season rematch with Kaarg is unsubtly telegraphed". However, he does states that "[t]here are some good moments [in "Part Two"], particularly as Chrissie Jackson gets more character development in one 30-second scene than she had in most of [Series One]".

Holm likens Sarah Jane's gang to Mystery, Inc. from Scooby-Doo and sees Kaagh as "a character somewhere between the sadistic Styre from The Sontaran Experiment and General Staal in "The Sonataran Stratagem"." Both Rawson-Jones and Holm view Kaagh's cloaking abilities as a "homage" to "'80s action classic" Predator (1987).

== Novelisation ==
The Last Sontaran
- Author: Phil Ford
- Series: The Sarah Jane Adventures #7
- Published: 6 November 2008; Penguin Books
- Pages: 128
- ISBN: 1-405-90509-3
- Preceded by: The Lost Boy
- Followed by: The Day of the Clown

This was the seventh of eleven Sarah Jane Adventures serials to be adapted as a novel. Written by Phil Ford, the book was first published in Paperback on 6 November 2008.
