= The Day of the Clown =

2008 Sarah Jane Adventures story

08 – The Day of the Clown
- The Sarah Jane Adventures story

Cast
- Starring: Tommy Knight – Luke Smith; Elisabeth Sladen – Sarah Jane Smith; Daniel Anthony – Clyde Langer; Anjli Mohindra – Rani Chandra; Alexander Armstrong – Voice of Mr Smith
- Others: Jem Brownlee – Dave Finn; Aaron Showsanya – Tony Warner; Bradley Walsh – The Pied Piper; Yasmin Paige – Voice of Maria Jackson; Huw Higginson – Mr Cunningham; Elijah Baker – Steve Wallace; Ace Bhatti – Haresh Chandra; Mina Anwar – Gita Chandra; Alan Ruscoe and Sean Palmer – Clowns; Floella Benjamin – Professor Rivers; Jessica Mogridge – Young Sarah Jane

Production
- Directed by: Michael Kerrigan
- Written by: Phil Ford
- Script editor: Gary Russell
- Produced by: Nikki Smith
- Executive producers: Russell T Davies; Julie Gardner
- Music by: Sam Watts
- Production code: 2.3 and 2.4
- Series: Series 2
- Running time: 2 episodes, 25 minutes each
- First broadcast: 6 October 2008
- Last broadcast: 13 October 2008

Chronology
← Preceded by The Last Sontaran	Followed by → Secrets of the Stars

The Day of the Clown is the second serial of the second series of the British science fiction television series The Sarah Jane Adventures. It was first broadcast in two weekly parts on the CBBC channel on 6 and 13 October 2008. The Day of the Clown introduces main character Rani Chandra (Anjli Mohindra) and her parents, Haresh (Ace Bhatti) and Gita Chandra (Mina Anwar) to the series, with Rani joining the series' main cast. Rani succeeds the character of Maria Jackson (Yasmin Paige) as a main character in this serial, as Paige had left the series to focus on her academic studies. The serial was filmed in April 2008 and aired later that year on CBBC.

The serial depicts Rani moving onto the street which Sarah Jane Smith (Elisabeth Sladen) and her son Luke Smith (Tommy Knight) live on. Rani ends up joining Sarah Jane, Luke, and Luke's friend Clyde Langer (Daniel Anthony) in investigating a mysterious figure named Odd Bob the Clown, who is actually an alien who goes by the alias of Elijah Spellman (Bradley Walsh). The group believe Spellman to be behind the disappearances of several children.

The serial received positive reviews from critics, who highlighted the usage of a clown as an antagonist and the performance of Walsh. The serial was later novelised in November 2008.

== Plot ==
Luke Smith (Tommy Knight) and Clyde Langer (Daniel Anthony) meet Rani Chandra (Anjli Mohindra), a new pupil and aspiring journalist at Park Vale school who has moved onto Luke's street, Bannerman Road. Many children have disappeared in the past few weeks, and Clyde and Rani are stalked by a clown who was spotted prior to the disappearance of Clyde's friend Dave Finn (Jem Brownlee). Investigative journalist and Luke's mother Sarah Jane Smith (Elisabeth Sladen) and Clyde link the disappearances of the children to a museum, which Clyde has received a ticket for. Rani begins her own investigation and discovers a ticket in the school book of one of the missing children, resulting in her joining Sarah Jane and Clyde at the museum. After exploring, they encounter the mysterious Elijah Spellman (Bradley Walsh), who reveals himself to be an alien that has taken on multiple forms, including the clown stalking the children, as well as having formerly been the Pied Piper of Hamelin. Spellman seeks to take children away and feed off people's fear of children going missing. When Rani's phone goes off, electromagnetic rays interfere with Spellman's energy, allowing the group to escape. Sarah Jane offers Rani the chance to join her, Luke, and Clyde in fighting aliens, which Rani agrees to.

At school the next day, the children in the courtyard pick up balloons dropped from the sky by Spellman. Sarah Jane's alien computer Mr. Smith (Alexander Armstrong) uses the cellular phone system to interfere with Spellman's control and the children are released. Spellman kidnaps Luke, causing Sarah Jane to become scared due to her fear of clowns. Clyde helps Sarah Jane overcome her fear, weakening Spellman. Spellman retreats to a meteorite which he initially arrived to Earth on; Sarah Jane takes the meteorite and seals it inside of a box nothing can escape from. The kidnapped children, including Luke, are returned.

== Development ==
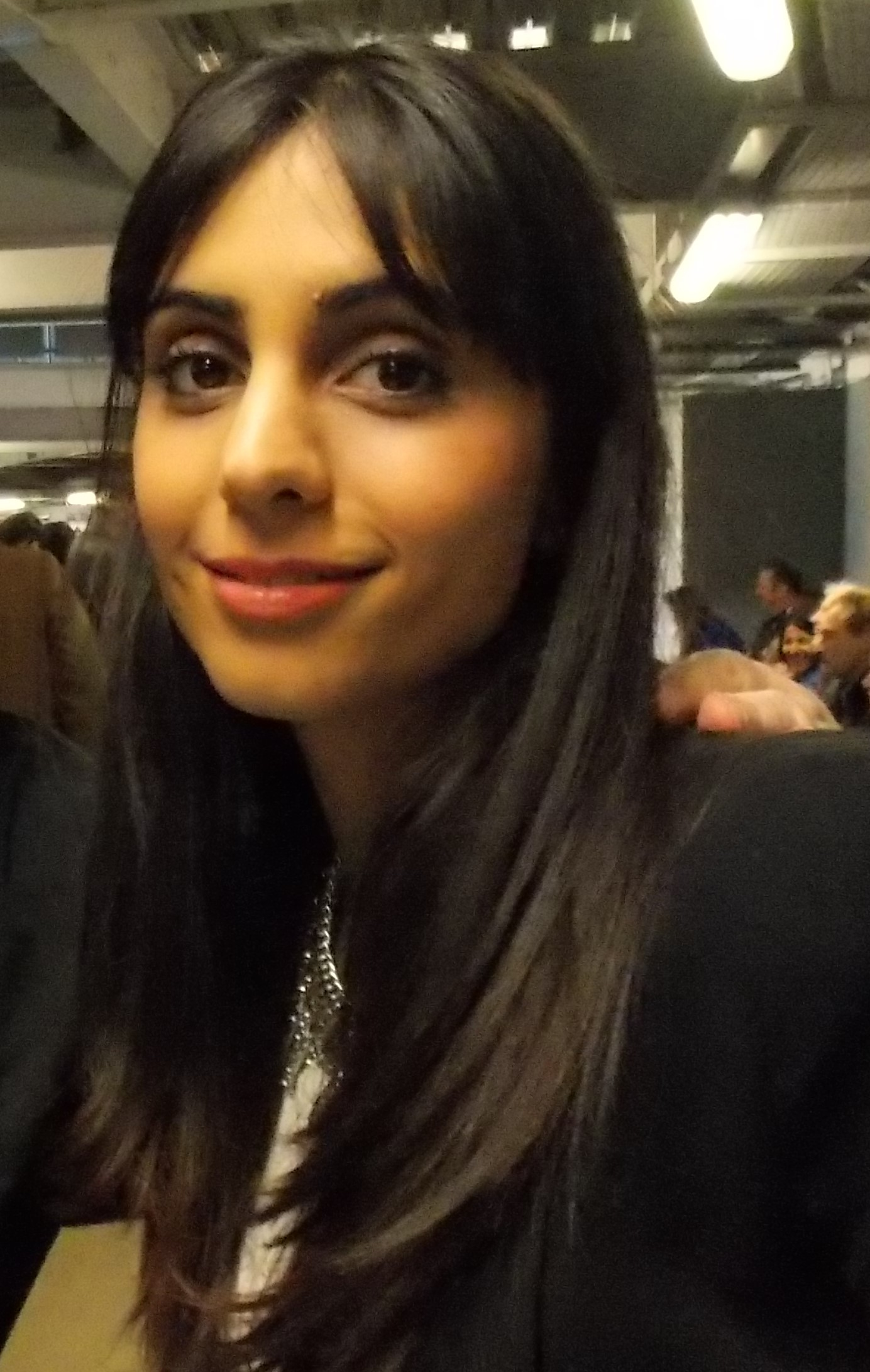
The Day of the Clown was Anjli Mohindra's (pictured in 2013) first serial for the series.

Maria Jackson, a previous main character portrayed by actress Yasmin Paige, was written out of the series so Paige could focus on her academic studies. As a result, The Day of the Clown introduces the character Rani Chandra, portrayed by actress Anjli Mohindra, who succeeds Jackson in a main character role. Showrunner Russell T Davies and the production team wanted to ensure that Rani and her family were different from Maria, with Davies stating that Rani was more "streetwise" and more "headstrong" than Maria was. The original shooting script described Rani as "small, athletic, and pretty". In an interview for SFX, Mohindra stated that Rani was a vastly different character from Maria, though both share a similar strong will. Mohindra stated that Rani's relationship with Sarah Jane was more akin to an "apprentice" dynamic, with Rani often looking to Sarah Jane for what to do in tough situations. Rani was made into an aspiring journalist as well, reflecting how Sarah Jane is also a journalist.

The serial also introduced Rani's family, including her parents Haresh and Gita. Rani's family name was originally Rakhit, with her parents named Suresh and Sundra instead of Haresh and Gita. Haresh was put into the role of the school principal to allow for "greater interaction" in regards to plots involving the characters' school lives.

The serial was written by writer Phil Ford. It was filmed in April 2008 in the second series' first block of production. Though scenes involving the Chandras' house were filmed on Clinton Road, the real-world stand-in for Bannerman Road, many scenes inside of their house were filmed in Upper Boat Studios, where the house interior from Clinton was re-created in detail. Cardiff High School was used as a stand-in for the kids' school, Park Vale. The Paget Rooms on Victoria Road in Penarth, Wales was used for the location of Odd Bob's museum. Comedian Bradley Walsh was cast in the role of the serial's antagonist, Elijah Spellman, with Walsh also portraying his Odd Bob the Clown guise. Floella Benjamin also appeared in the episode as Professor Rivers, a character who had appeared earlier in the series.

== Broadcast and reception ==
=== Broadcast ===
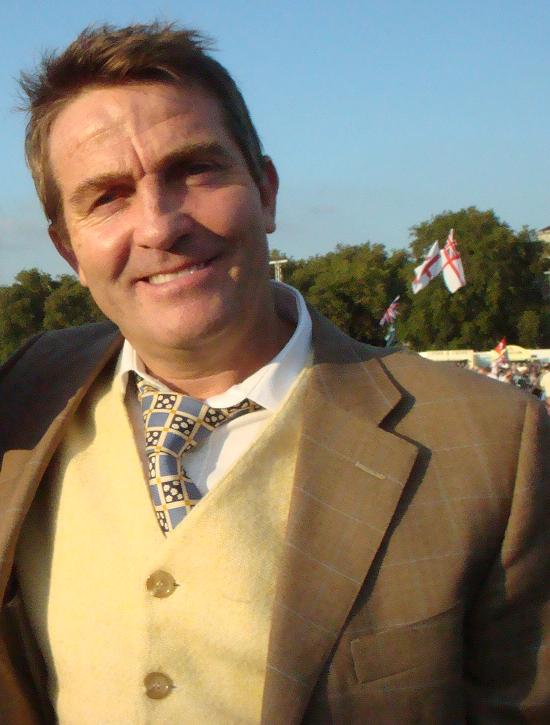
Bradley Walsh's (pictured) performance was the subject of commentary from reviewers

"Part One" was first broadcast on the CBBC Channel at 5.15 p.m. on Monday 6 October 2008 and was repeated as part of CBBC on BBC One at 4.35 p.m. on Monday 13 October 2008. It was made available for 14 days after first broadcast on the BBC iPlayer. "Part Two" was first broadcast on the CBBC Channel at 5.15 p.m. on Monday 13 October 2008 and was repeated on BBC One at 4.35 p.m. on Monday 20 October 2008.

=== Critical reception ===
Writing for Dreamwatch, Matt McAllister stated that the episode "may not be earth-shattering kids’ TV, but it’s good creepy fun nonetheless". He positively highlighted the performance of Walsh and the usage of a clown as an antagonist. Writing for Digital Spy, Ben Rawson-Jones felt that Mohindra's performance as Rani was weaker compared to her co-stars, though he positively highlighted the performance of Walsh. IGN's praised the usage of a clown as an antagonist in the story, believing that it reflected a common childhood fear very well, and that Sarah Jane also being scared of clowns allowed it to be put into "perspective for young viewers." Michael Bush, writing for Den of Geek, positively highlighted the performances of the cast, as well as the episode's effective usage of a clown as an antagonist in a science fiction setting. However, Bush felt Walsh's performance and his usage of accents in differentiating Spellman's various forms was a "weak link" in the episode.

== Novelisation ==
The Day of the Clown
- Author: Phil Ford
- Series: The Sarah Jane Adventures #8
- Published: 6 November 2008; Penguin Books
- Pages: 128
- ISBN: 1-405-90510-7
- Preceded by: The Last Sontaran
- Followed by: The Wedding of Sarah Jane Smith

The serial was later adapted as a novel. Written by Phil Ford, the book was first published in paperback on 6 November 2008.
