= K9 (Doctor Who) =

Fictional character from Doctor Who and The Sarah Jane Adventures

- Doctor Who character
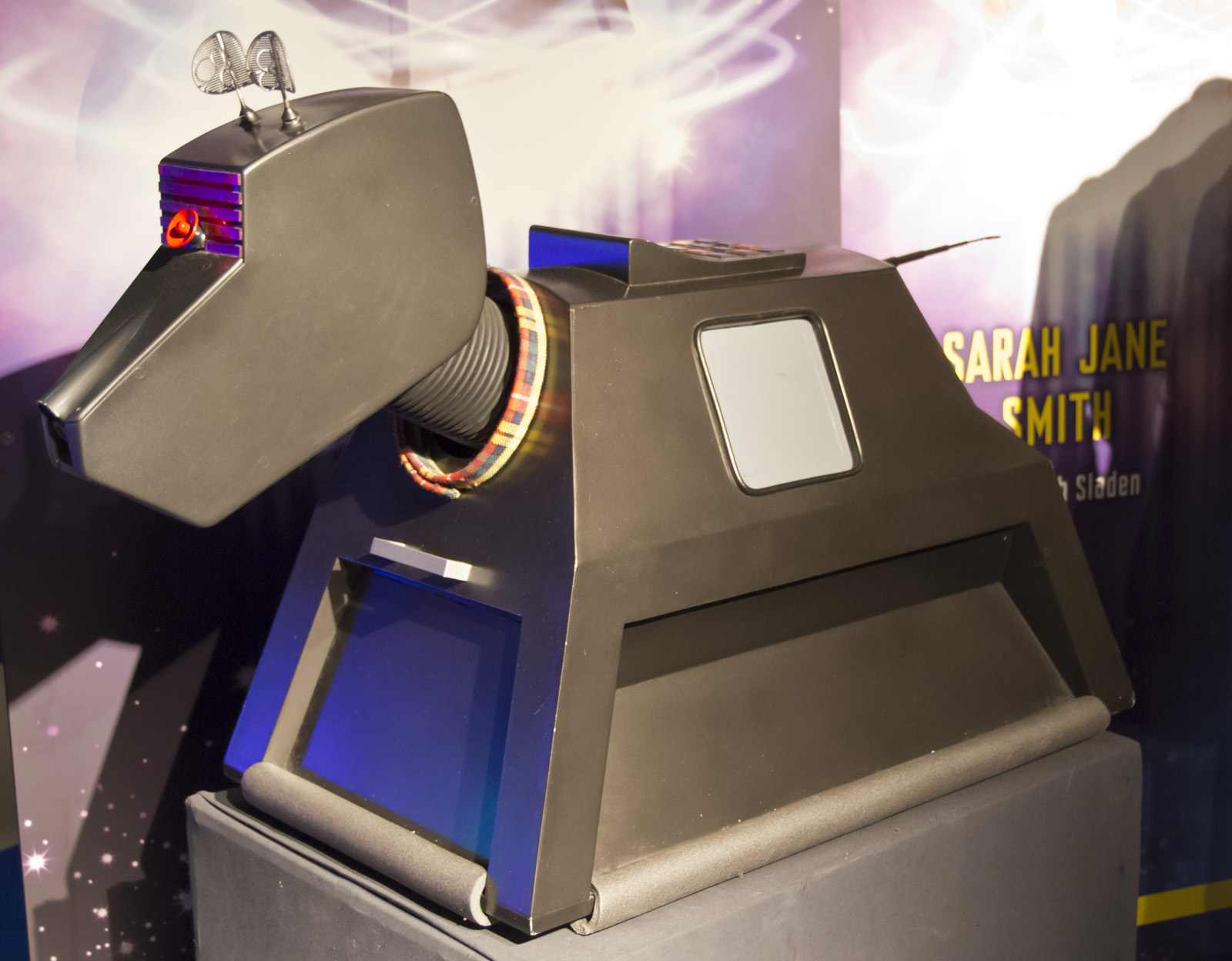
- K9 at the Doctor Who Experience in 2012
- First appearance: The Invisible Enemy (1977)
- Last appearance: Goodbye, Sarah Jane Smith (2010)
- Created by: Bob Baker; Dave Martin
- Voiced by: John Leeson (1977–1979, 1980–2010); David Brierley (1979–1980); Roy Skelton (1979; uncredited)
- Shared universe appearances: K-9 and Company (1981); The Sarah Jane Adventures (2007–2010); K9 (2009–2010)
- Non-canonical appearances: Dimensions in Time (1993)
- Duration: 1977–1981, 1983, 1993, 2006–2010

In-universe information
- Affiliation: Professor Marius; Fourth Doctor; Tenth Doctor; Sarah Jane Smith; Luke Smith; Leela; Romana; Professor Gryffen
- Home era: 51st century; 20th–21st centuries

K9, occasionally written K-9, is the name of several fictional robotic canines (dogs, the name being a pun on the pronunciation of "canine") in the long-running British science fiction television series Doctor Who, first appearing in 1977. K9 has also been a central character in three of the series' television spin-offs: the one-off K-9 and Company (1981), The Sarah Jane Adventures (2007–2011) and K9 (2009–2010). Although not originally intended to be a recurring character in the series, K9 was kept in the show following his first appearance because he was expected to be popular with younger audiences. There have been at least four separate K9 units in the series, with the first two being companions of the Fourth Doctor. Voice actor John Leeson has provided the character's voice in most of his appearances, except during season 17 of Doctor Who, in which David Brierley temporarily did so. The character was created by Bob Baker and Dave Martin, to whom rights to the character still belong; consequently, Baker's spin-off series K9, which is not BBC-produced, could not directly reference events or characters from Doctor Who, though it attempted to be a part of that continuity.

Within the series' narrative, K9 is a robot dog acquired by Doctor Who's title character (the Doctor) in the 1977 serial The Invisible Enemy. The first two incarnations of the character travelled alongside the Fourth Doctor (portrayed by Tom Baker) until 1981. In these stories, K9 proved useful for the powerful laser weapon concealed in his nose, his encyclopaedic knowledge and his vast computer intelligence. By 1981, each of the two models of K9 which travelled alongside the Doctor had been left with one of the Doctor's female companions. The character subsequently transitioned into spin-off territory. Producers hoped K9's popularity with children would launch the series K-9 and Company, led by actress Elisabeth Sladen in the role of companion Sarah Jane Smith alongside a new K9. In 2006, K9 reappeared in the revived series of Doctor Who. Although the character's appearances in the 2007 spin-off The Sarah Jane Adventures were hampered by the concurrent development of the K9 spin-off, the character began to appear full-time in both K9 and The Sarah Jane Adventures, depicting adventures of the original K9 Mark I and of Mark IV, respectively.

== Televised appearances ==
=== K9 Mark I ===
K9, retroactively "K9 Mark I" (Leeson), initially appeared in The Invisible Enemy (1977) as the creation of Professor Marius (Frederick Jaeger) in the year 5000. K9 subsequently travelled with the Fourth Doctor (Tom Baker) and Leela (Louise Jameson) as a companion of the Doctor in his adventures in time and space until The Invasion of Time (1978). In this serial, K9 decides to remain on the Doctor's home planet of Gallifrey with Leela. Immediately afterwards, Doctor Who would introduce a second incarnation of K9, played by the same prop; the last scene of The Invasion of Time shows the Doctor unpacking a box labelled "K9 Mk II".

Although the first incarnation of K9 does not appear again in televised Doctor Who media, he is the star of the 2009 K9 television series, in which he undergoes a sort of "regeneration" process from which a new, more sophisticated and futuristic K9 emerges; in the first series of K9, the character is transported to London c. 2050 by Professor Gryffen (Robert Moloney). Though on regeneration the character loses his memory of his adventures with the Doctor, he assists Gryffen and several teenage companions against a dystopian regime of "The Department". The upgraded K9 has new specifications, sporting a sophisticated head-up display, the ability to fly, and more powerful laser weapons.

=== K9 Mark II ===
Introduced into the plot in The Invasion of Time, K9 Mark II first actually appears on-screen in The Ribos Operation (1978). More mobile than his predecessor, Mark II exhibited the ability to sense and warn others of danger. He travels as a companion alongside the Doctor and Romana. Around the time of Romana's regeneration (the transition from actress Mary Tamm to Lalla Ward), the K9 character was explained as suffering from "laryngitis" to accommodate Leeson's departure from the series at the start of the 1979–80 season; for this time, he was portrayed by David Brierley, until Leeson's return for the 1980–81 season. When the Doctor and Romana travel to the parallel universe of E-Space, K9 is severely damaged, in Warriors' Gate (1981). The damage was such that K9 could only function in E-Space; when Romana decided to stay and forge her own path, the Doctor gave K9 to her. The character makes subsequent appearances in remakes of the unfinished serial Shada, alongside the Eighth Doctor (Paul McGann); the 2003 Shada audio play and webcast depict K9 Mark II as having returned to Gallifrey with Romana, now Lady President of the Time Lords, where the Doctor visits them.

=== K9 Mark III ===
K9 Mark III first appeared in "A Girl's Best Friend", the 1981 pilot for a series, K-9 and Company, which never materialized beyond the first episode. In this, the character is presented to the Doctor's former companion Sarah Jane Smith (Elisabeth Sladen); together, the two embark on a number of adventures. Only the first of these is depicted on-screen; several are shown in comic book and audio play adaptations, and others are alluded to by the television series. Mark III made a brief appearance alongside Sarah Jane in the Doctor Who 20th anniversary ninety-minute special "The Five Doctors" (1983), before appearing properly and for the final time in the revived series' episode "School Reunion" in 2006. By the time of that story, Mark III has fallen into disrepair and eventually sacrifices himself to stop a plot by the alien Krillitane and defeat their leader, Lucas Finch (Anthony Head). In the episode's conclusion, the Doctor presents Sarah Jane with a new K9 to encourage her to continue investigating alien activity; the Doctor "rebuilt" him after the Mark III's sacrifice, implying that he had the same mind and memories as his predecessor while still being a "brand new model".

=== K9 Mark IV ===
After debuting in the final scene of "School Reunion" (2006), K9 Mark IV returned in spin-off series The Sarah Jane Adventures' premiere episode "Invasion of the Bane", where due to licensing issues with creator Bob Baker it is explained that K9 is sealing a black hole and can only communicate briefly and infrequently with Sarah Jane. The character makes a heroic appearance in the first series finale The Lost Boy, to do battle with rogue alien supercomputer Mr Smith (Alexander Armstrong), demonstrating new CGI teleportation and hovering features. K9 Mark IV's interfaces include at least one USB port. Subsequently, the character appears briefly in the Doctor Who series four finale "Journey's End" (2008), wherein K9 and Mr Smith assist the Doctor in returning Earth to its proper position. K9 next appears in the comedic Red Nose Day 2009 Sarah Jane mini-episode "From Raxacoricofallapatorius with Love". A deal with the creators of K9 having been struck, K9 Mark IV became a regular character in The Sarah Jane Adventures in third series story, The Mad Woman in the Attic (2009), until the series four premiere The Nightmare Man (2010), where he accompanies departing series regular, Sarah Jane's adoptive son Luke Smith (Tommy Knight), to university. He appears again in series four finale, Goodbye, Sarah Jane Smith. Though he doesn't appear in the serial, it is mentioned in The Man Who Never Was (2011) that Luke invented a special dog whistle to summon him with.

== Other appearances ==
=== Literature ===
K9's co-creator Dave Martin wrote a series of four children's books entitled The Adventures of K9, published by Sparrow Books in 1980. K9 is travelling on his own in these stories for reasons not explained.

In 1985, a series of gamebooks featuring the Sixth Doctor were published by Severn House under the title Make your own adventure with Doctor Who in Britain and Find Your Fate – Doctor Who in the United States. These books were actually written by scriptwriters for the television series. Martin wrote Search for the Doctor which takes place in the mid-21st century and features Sarah's K9 (at time of publication assumed to be Mark III, but clearly Mark IV in the light of School Reunion) being reunited with the Sixth Doctor long after Sarah's death.

A short story, "Moving On", in Virgin Publishing's Decalog 3: Consequences anthology and the Big Finish Productions-produced Sarah Jane Smith audio play Mirror, Signal, Manoeuvre (both written by Peter Anghelides) indicate that K9 Mark III broke down and Sarah was unable to repair it as the replacement circuits would not be invented for several centuries.

Another short story, "Tautology", by Glenn Langford (Doctor Who Magazine #194), suggests that K9 Mark III's motherboard will be passed down through Sarah's descendants and eventually end up in the hands of Professor Marius, who will use it to build the first K9, creating an ontological paradox.

The Virgin New Adventures seventh Doctor novel Lungbarrow (written by former Doctor TV series writer Marc Platt) featured K9s Marks I and II meeting for the first time on Gallifrey during the events surrounding the disappearance of the Doctor's entire family house and his living relatives, which also featured many previous established Gallifreyan based characters. The two collaborated towards rescuing the Doctor, then current companion Chris Cwej and the Doctor's lost family. This novel also served as the direct lead-in story to the 1996 Doctor Who telemovie.

Jealous, Possessive by Paul Magrs, the "Scorpio" story in Big Finish's anthology Short Trips: Zodiac features K9 Mark I and Mark II relaying their exploits to each other, and their veiled put-downs to each other reveal that each considers the other to be the "inferior" version. This attitude is also occasionally hinted at in the way the two units refer to each other in the Gallifrey audio series.

The Eighth Doctor Adventures novel Interference: Book Two by Lawrence Miles indicates that the Doctor built a Mark IV model sometime prior to the events of that book, but what happened to this unit is not stated. In the novel The Gallifrey Chronicles by Lance Parkin, K9 Mark II makes another appearance, having been trapped within the TARDIS since the events of The Ancestor Cell. At the end of The Gallifrey Chronicles the Doctor sends K9 on a secret mission to Espero, presumably to seek out his former companion, the living TARDIS known as Compassion.

=== Movie ===
On 24 October 2015, Bob Baker and Paul Tams announced the film K9: TimeQuake slated for cinemas in 2017 and to feature the robot dog facing off against classic Doctor Who villain Omega in deep space. However, this did not happen leaving it unknown when the movie will be released. In 2018 it was confirmed TimeQuake was confirmed to still be in pre-production, with plans for a prequel TV show to establish K9 for modern audiences before the movie. As of May 2024, no further updates have been made.

=== Audio plays ===
In the spin-off media, K9 Mark II remained Romana's faithful companion for many years. In the early 2000s, John Leeson and Lalla Ward featured in a series of audio plays produced by BBV as K9 and "The Mistress", detailing these characters' adventures in a parallel universe. As neither Romana nor E-Space could be licensed, the aliases of the Mistress and the "pocket universe" were used instead.

When Romana eventually returned to her own universe, she brought K9 Mark II with her (presumably having repaired it) and eventually became Lady President of Gallifrey. K9 Mark II is first seen on Gallifrey in the Virgin New Adventures novel Lungbarrow by Marc Platt, alongside K9 Mark I, which had remained with Leela. Both K9 Mark I and Mark II appear, voiced by Leeson, in the Big Finish Productions audio adventure Zagreus and the Gallifrey audio series. Leela's K9 (Mark I) was destroyed at the conclusion of the second Gallifrey series and only Mark II appears in the third series.

K9, played again by John Leeson, also featured in the Big Finish Productions series of Fourth Doctor Adventures – Mark II in Series 2 alongside Mary Tamm (Romana I), Mark I in Series 4 alongside Louise Jameson (Leela) and Mark II in Series 5 alongside Lalla Ward (Romana II)

=== Online media ===
In 2003, a webcast adaptation of the never-completed Shada serial was produced for the BBC's Doctor Who website, rewritten as an Eighth Doctor adventure and featuring the post-E-Space versions of Romana II and K9 Mk II.

According to the official website for The Sarah Jane Adventures in 2007, the Doctor stored several presents for Sarah inside K9, including a "sonic lipstick" and a watch that scans for alien life.

=== Video games ===
K9 appears in the Lego Dimensions video game. He is part of the Doctor Who Level Pack as a rideable vehicle. Archive recordings of John Leeson's performance was used in-game as he was unavailable.

== Conceptual history ==
K9 was the brainchild of writers Bob Baker and Dave Martin. Its purpose was to have a character that could narrate while the miniaturised clones of the Doctor and Leela were inside the Doctor's body during the events of The Invisible Enemy. Martin's own dog had also been recently run over by a car, and K9 was a car-proof tribute to it.

K9 was not originally intended to be a companion, but producer Graham Williams liked the concept so much that the decision was made to retain him as a regular character, in order to appeal to the younger members of the audience. The original name for the character was "FIDO" – apparently from "Phenomenal [sic] Indication Data Observation" unit – but it was eventually named K9.

The initial idea for realising K9 was to use a small actor inside a robotic Dobermann costume, but that was rejected in favour of a radio-controlled prop, designed by Tony Harding and made by the BBC Visual Effects Department. The Radio Control Model Centre in Harlington Middx owned by Derek Wales was commissioned to build the electronics into the first original basic shell and consequently the centre operated the dog on set for the BBC. The robot suffered from numerous technical problems during its time in the series, often malfunctioning because the radio controls interfered with the cameras and vice versa. On location, K9 also proved unable to traverse uneven terrain, and shots had to be conceived with this in mind. Workarounds included using a concealed piece of twine to pull the character along (this string can be clearly seen in a shot of K9 on Brighton Beach), or laying wooden planks on which it could roll.

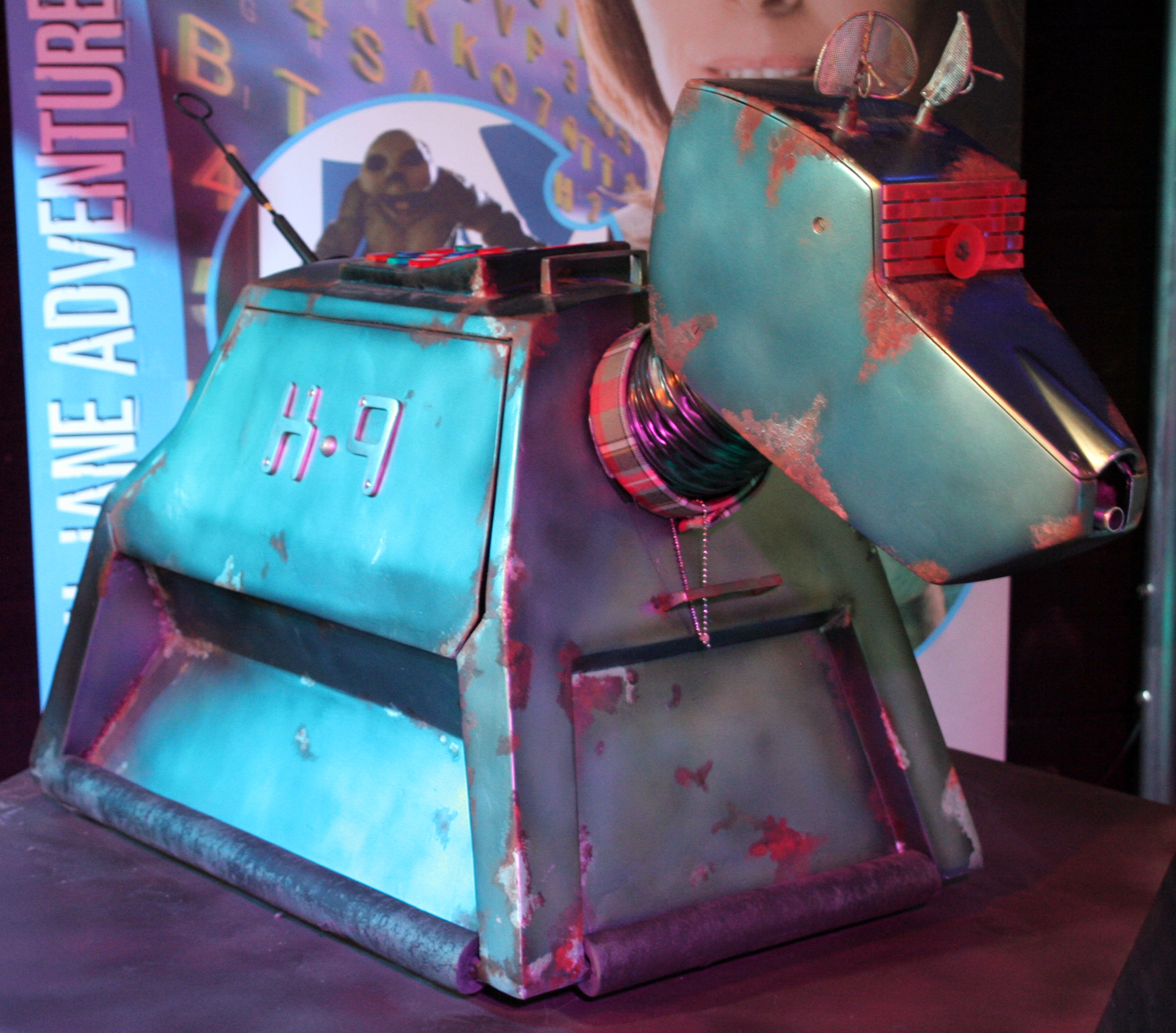
K9 Mark III as he appeared in the 2006 series and The Sarah Jane Adventures, showing wear and tear.

K9's innards were redesigned twice more over the course of the series, firstly in collaboration with a company called Slough Radio Control. It allowed one of its employees, Nigel Brackley, to be seconded to the series semi-permanently to supervise the prop. Brackley, who went on to a career in the movie industry, controlled K9 for many of its studio appearances. Eventually, there came a point where the dog's inherent liabilities were outweighing his assets, and the internal mechanisms were completely rebuilt by designer Charlie Lumm. The wheels were enlarged and given independent drives for power and better manoeuvrability, and the radio controls were switched from AM to FM signals to resist interference. However, by the time the improved model made his debut in State of Decay, the first story recorded for Season 18, the decision had already been made to write the character out of the series in the adventure Warriors' Gate.

K9 was a popular enough character to warrant an attempt to spin him off into his own series. In addition to K9 dolls, there were also talking K9 toys produced by Palitoy, the speech provided by a miniature record inside the body of the toy. John Leeson provided the voice for K9 in all its appearances, except for Season 17 (which included the unfinished Shada) when it was voiced by David Brierley. When Shada was remade by Big Finish Productions, Leeson provided its voice.

The practical challenges of working with the K9 prop continued on his return to Doctor Who in 2006. Producer Russell T Davies told SFX magazine, "Yes, just as we expected, multiple takes [were required] when he bumped into a door or veered off to the left. Lis Sladen did warn us, and she was right!" Two different incarnations of K9 appeared regularly in Doctor Who spin-offs from 2009: Mark IV in the third series of BBC production The Sarah Jane Adventures, and a re-vamped Mark I in the Jetix Europe production K9.

== K9 (2010 spin-off series) ==
K9 hovering in the MIPTV trailer for the 2010 series

A proposed K9 television series or special had been rumoured since the late 1990s, and images of a redesigned K9 were leaked. However, nothing came of this effort until 2006.

On 24 April 2006, The Independent, the Daily Star and The Times confirmed, following previous rumours, that K9 would be featured in a 26-part children's series, K9, to be written by Bob Baker. The article in The Times also featured a picture of the redesigned K9 for the animated series. The series was a blend of live-action and a CGI K9.

Each episode was 30 minutes long, made by Jetix Europe and London-based distribution outfit Park Entertainment. According to a report in Broadcast magazine, the BBC opted out of involvement in order to focus on their own Doctor Who spin-off, Torchwood, meaning that BBC-owned characters did not appear in the series.

On 3 April 2010, the TV series K9 began broadcasting on the Australian Television Network Ten as part of a Saturday morning line-up of children's shows. John Leeson was the voice of K9. The first episode, called "Regeneration", featured the earlier Mark I version of K9. The "older" K9 materialized in London in the future and in the midst of an incident where an alien species is threatening human lives. K9 sacrificed himself in order to save the humans, but one component survived that enabled his self-regeneration into the new unit. The main human cast members include Robert Moloney as Professor Gryffen, Keegan Joyce as Starkey (K9's new "master"), and Daniel Webber as Darius. The series was broadcast in the UK mid-morning on Channel 5 in December 2010 and January 2011.

== Cultural influence ==
In 1990, an unspecified K9 unit appeared with Sylvester McCoy as the Seventh Doctor and Sophie Aldred as Ace in an episode of the children's education programme Search Out Science entitled Search Out Space, which was included as an extra on the release of the Doctor Who story Survival by the BBC. Another unspecified K9 unit also appeared in the 1993 charity special Dimensions in Time. In the 1998 computer game Fallout 2, the Navarro base has a damaged robot dog known as K9, which uses similar speech mannerisms to the Infobox Doctor Who character. If repaired, the cyberdog is willing to join the character's party as a companion. In the 1999 television series Queer as Folk (written by future Doctor Who executive producer Russell T Davies), a K9 model is given to the character Vince as a birthday present. The prop used was an original, operated – as occasionally in Doctor Who – by visual effects assistant Mat Irvine. In the second series of I'm Alan Partridge (2002), the character of Alan Partridge recalls how his purchase of the rights to K9 contributed to his mental breakdown and driving to Dundee in his bare feet while gorging on Toblerone. In the South Park episode "Go God Go XII" (2006), Eric Cartman, being trapped in the year 2546, has acquired a robot dog called "K-10", a parody of K9. Due to timeline alterations, he is replaced by robot cat "Kit-9" and later robot bird, "Cocka-3". K9 appeared on a special Doctor Who-themed edition of The Weakest Link in 2007, but was voted out unanimously at the end of the first round, despite answering his question correctly. This was due to the fact every single player of the team answered correctly and banked the £5,000 target, and that the producers told the contestants to vote him off, just in case he broke down. Anne Robinson (whom K9 addressed as "Mistress") said "I'm so sorry" before declaring him the weakest link.

In the final area of the game Secret of Evermore, the main character's dog appears similar to K9 and can fire lasers from its mouth.

Engineers at NASA's Ames Research Center have dubbed two intelligent mobile robots designed to explore the surface of Mars "K-9" and "Gromit". NASA's K-9 is named after both Doctor Who's K-9 and Marvin the Martian's pet dog, K-9.

Several individuals have built their own personal K9 robots, ranging from radio controlled units like that used on the show to several levels of computerised autonomy.

K-9 Mail is a popular e-mail client for the Android operating system, with the name and the logo being a direct reference to the K9 robot.

On November 3, 2020, American newspaper the New York Times used three different coloured K9s circling a ballot box as an animated graphic logo for their coverage of the social media and the 2020 US Presidential Election.

== See also ==
- List of Doctor Who robots
