= Sky (The Sarah Jane Adventures) =

2011 Sarah Jane Adventures story

25 – Sky
- The Sarah Jane Adventures story
- Official Poster from the BBC Website.

Cast
- Starring: Elisabeth Sladen – Sarah Jane Smith; Tommy Knight – Luke Smith; Daniel Anthony – Clyde Langer; Anjli Mohindra – Rani Chandra; Sinead Michael – Sky; Alexander Armstrong – Mr Smith
- Others: Mina Anwar – Gita Chandra; Ace Bhatti – Haresh Chandra; Christine Stephen-Daly – Miss Myers; Gavin Brocker – Caleb; Paul Kasey – The Metalkind; Chloe Savage, Ella Savage, Amber Donaldson, Scarlet Donaldson – Baby Sky; Floella Benjamin – Professor Rivers; Peter-Hugo Daly – Hector; Will McLeod – Voice of The Metalkind

Production
- Directed by: Ashley Way
- Written by: Phil Ford
- Script editor: Gary Russell
- Produced by: Brian Minchin; Phil Ford (co-producer)
- Executive producer(s): Russell T Davies; Nikki Wilson
- Music by: Sam Watts
- Production code: 5.1 and 5.2
- Series: Series 5
- Running time: 2 episodes, 25 minutes each
- First broadcast: 3 October 2011
- Last broadcast: 4 October 2011

Chronology
← Preceded by Goodbye, Sarah Jane Smith	Followed by → The Curse of Clyde Langer

Sky is a two-part story of The Sarah Jane Adventures which was broadcast on CBBC on 3 and 4 October 2011. It is the first story of the fifth and final series. In this episode, Sinead Michael joins the main cast.

== Plot ==
=== Part 1 ===
A meteor crashes in a junk yard, revealing a metal man. At the same time, Sarah Jane discovers a baby on her doorstep who can create power surges. She and Rani travel to the site of the meteor crash—leaving the baby with Clyde—and are met by Professor Rivers, who investigates the site with them. They find a homeless man who saw the crash and describes the metal man, who they discover is heading to Bannerman Road.

Meanwhile, an alien woman named Miss Myers appears at a nuclear power station and locates the power surge on Bannerman Road. She heads to Sarah Jane's garden where Clyde and the baby named Sky are being attacked by the metal man. Miss Myers saves Clyde and Sky and reveals that she is Sky's mother and an alien. However, Clyde does not trust her and refuses to hand Sky over.

Mr Smith locates Clyde at the power station, and Sarah Jane and Rani make their way there to find Clyde, Sky and Miss Myers, who reveals that her species, the Fleshkind are fighting a war against the Metalkind. Sky is a weapon who will end the war. The Metalkind walks in, and Sky transforms from a baby into a twelve-year-old girl.

=== Part 2 ===
Miss Myers induces Sky to release a burst of energy that knocks over the Metalkind. Miss Myers reveals that Sky was "grown" in a Fleshkind laboratory as a weapon against the Metalkind. Unwilling to allow Sky to be used as a weapon, Sarah Jane and the gang escape with her. Miss Myers has the Metalkind wired to the nuclear core. Back at Bannerman Road, Mr Smith concludes that Sky's metamorphosis was caused by her synthetic DNA and was done to maximize her effectiveness as a bomb.

At Sky's insistence, Sarah Jane and the team return to the power station. Sarah Jane goes inside, looking for Miss Myers, and Sky follows. Sarah Jane learns that the damaged Metalkind has been programmed to summon other Metalkind, believing he is calling his comrades to victory over all flesh kind, including Earth's inhabitants. Miss Myers explains that Sky will be activated automatically upon the Metalkind's arrival on Earth.

Stating that she must save Earth, Sky heads to the nuclear core room, where a portal that will allow the Metalkind to arrive begins to open. Clyde and Rani head to the control room, where they discover how to retract the fuel rods and shut down the reactor. The portal shuts abruptly, inducing another power surge. The energy backlashes on Sky, destroying her genetic programming and leaving her as a normal, harmless child. Miss Myers does not want Sky anymore, as she is no longer a weapon. The Metalkind, who saved some of the portal's energy, breaks loose and takes Miss Myers back to his home planet.

Sarah Jane explains Sky's appearance to Gita and Haresh at Bannerman Road. When Sarah Jane's car's lights flicker, Clyde and Rani suspect that Sky's powers aren't entirely gone. In the attic, Sarah Jane finds the Shopkeeper and the Captain, previously met in Lost in Time. He reveals that he placed infant Sky on her doorstep. Sky chooses to stay with Sarah Jane as her adoptive daughter.

== Broadcast ==
This was the first The Sarah Jane Adventures story to be aired following the death of Elisabeth Sladen. The first part was broadcast on Monday 3 October 2011 on CBBC while the second was broadcast on the following day, Tuesday 4 October 2011, on CBBC. The two parts were then again broadcast on Thursday 10 November and Friday 11 November 2011 on BBC One and for the first time in HD on BBC One HD.

Footage from this story of Clyde trying to make baby Sky laugh was featured in the BBC adaptation of Mr Stink.
