= Michael Kerrigan =

British television director (1952–2014)

- Born: Michael Joseph Kerrigan; 2 November 1952
- Died: 7 August 2014 (aged 61); Eastbourne, East Sussex, England
- Occupation: Television director

Michael Kerrigan (2 November 1952 – 7 August 2014) was a British television director noted for directing The Famous Five TV series and the children's show No. 73. He also directed the Doctor Who serial Battlefield in 1989. In 2008 he returned to the Doctor Who universe to direct four episodes of the spin-off series The Sarah Jane Adventures.

Kerrigan spent several years on the staff of the ITV network's south of England franchise-holder TVS, and his first credit was as a "Programme Associate" on the first edition of No. 73 to be made at the company's Maidstone studios.

== Filmography ==
- Jackanory (1965)
- Angels (1975)
- Spine Chillers (1980)
- A Little Silver Trumpet (1980)
- Maggie (1981 to 1982)
- Secrets (1982)
- Brookside (1982)
- The Baker Street Boys (1983)
- Dramarama
  - "The Universe Downstairs" (1985)
- Knights of God (1987)
- Jim Henson's Mother Goose Stories (1987 and 1989)
- Mr Majeika (1988)
- Doctor Who
  - Battlefield (4 parts, 1989)
- The Bill
  - "Old Friends" (1990)
  - "Ground Rules" (1990)
  - "Come Fly with Me" (1990)
- Parallel 9 (1992)
- Three Seven Eleven (1993)
- The Wild House (1996)
- The Famous Five
  - "Five Get into a Fix" (1996)
  - "Five on a Treasure Island" Part One and Two (1996)
  - "Five Get into Trouble" (1996)
  - "Five Fall into Adventure" (1996)
  - "Five Go Off to Camp" (1996)
  - "Five on Finniston Farm" (1996)
  - "Five Go to Smuggler's Top" Part One and Two (1996)
  - "Five Go to Demon's Rocks" (1996)
  - "Five Go Down to the Sea" Part One and Two (1996)
  - "Five Run Away Together" (1996)
  - "Five Go to Mystery Moor" (1996)
  - "Five Go Adventuring Again" (1997)
  - "Five on a Secret Trail" (1997)
  - "Five Go to Billycock Hill" Part One and Two (1997)
  - "Five Have a Mystery to Solve" (1997)
- The Phoenix and the Carpet (1997)
- Verdict
  - "Split Second" (1998)
- Ministry of Mayhem (2004)
- The Courtroom
  - "One in Six" (2004)
- The Basil Brush Show
  - "Big Bother" (2003)
  - "Basil's Haunted House" (2006)
  - "There's No Business Like Snow Business" (2006)
- Coronation Street
  - Episode #1.6520 (2007)
  - Episode #1.6521 (2007)
  - Episode #1.6522 (2007)
  - Episode #1.6571 (2007)
- The Sarah Jane Adventures
  - The Day of the Clown (2 parts, 2008)
  - Secrets of the Stars (2 parts, 2008)
- Captain Mack (2008)
