= Phil Gladwin =

Phil Gladwin is a television writer and script editor. He created the screenwriting website and platform Screenwriting Goldmine, designed to help train young screenwriters and provide them with key resources relating to craft and business. He set it up, following frustrations with conventional screenwriting teaching and practices.

== Life ==
He was born in Grimsby in 1963. As a teenager, Gladwin wrote lyrics and entered a short story contest. Following an attempt to write novels, Gladwin served as script editor on The Bill, Casualty, Berkeley Square and Trance, before later moving onto screenwriting as a full-time career.

=== Written work ===
- Grange Hill
- The Bill
  - Soft Talking - 2000
  - Real Crime - 2001
  - Eye of the Lens - 2001
  - Liquid City - 2001
  - 006 - 2002
  - 057 - 2002
  - 085 - 2003
  - 127 - 2003
- Crossroads - 2001
- If....
  - If... The Toxic Timebomb Goes Off - 2005
- Holby City
  - Actions Speak Louder - 2005
- Trial and Retribution XIII: Curriculum Vitae - 2007
- The Sarah Jane Adventures
  - Warriors of Kudlak, Part one and two - 2007
