= Phil Ford (writer) =

British television writer and producer

- Occupations: Screenwriter; producer
- Writing career
- Language: English
- Period: 1997–present
- Genres: Drama; science fiction

Phil Ford is a British television writer and producer. He is best known for his work on Gerry Anderson's New Captain Scarlet and Doctor Who. He was head writer and co-producer of the spin-off The Sarah Jane Adventures (2008–11), co-writer of "The Waters of Mars" (2009) and “Into the Dalek” (2014) with Russell T Davies and Steven Moffat, respectively, and wrote the majority of the 2010s video game series Doctor Who: The Adventure Games. In 2023, his novelisation of The Waters of Mars was released as part of the revived Target Books series.

In 2012, with Davies, he created Wizards vs Aliens, which ran for three series and gave him an executive producer credit.

He won a Hugo Award, a Writers' Guild Award and was four-times BAFTA nominated.

== Selected filmography ==
Production	Notes	Broadcaster
Taggart	"Berserker" (1997)	ITV
Coronation Street	86 Episodes (1997–2002)	ITV
Heartbeat	"Spellbound" (1998)	ITV
Bad Girls	"Love Rivals" (1999); "The Set-Up" (2000); "Family Plan" (2000); "The Chains of Freedom" (2001); "Uninvited Guests" (2001); "Cat and Mouse" (2001); "Unholy Alliances" (2002); "Pillow Talk" (2002); Episode 5.03 (2003); Episode 6.08 (2004); Episode 6.12 (2004); Episode 7.01 (2005); Episode 7.04 (2005); Episode 7.11 (2005); Episode 8.04 (2006); Episode 8.08 (2006); Christmas Special (2006) (2011)	ITV
The Bill	"Tolerance: Part 1" (2001); "Tolerance: Part 2" (2001); "Crush" (2001); "Quinnan 1" (2002)	ITV
Footballers' Wives	"All To Play For" (2002)	ITV
New Captain Scarlet	"Instrument of Destruction: Part One" (2005); "Instrument of Destruction: Part Two" (2005); "Swarm" (2005); "Rat Trap" (2005); "The Homecoming" (2005); "Mercury Falling" (2005); "Chiller" (2005); "Heist" (2005); "The Achilles Messenger" (2005); "Touch of the Reaper" (2005); "Virus" (2005); "Enigma" (2005); "Contact" (2005); "Proteus" (2005); "Syrtis Major" (2005); "Fallen Angels" (2005); "Storm at the End of the World" (2005); "Duel" (2005); "Shape Shifter" (2005); "Dominion" (2005); "Grey Skulls" (2005)	ITV
Bombshell	Various Episodes (2006)	TV ONE
Waterloo Road	Episode 2.06 (2007); Episode 2.12 (2007)	BBC One
The Sarah Jane Adventures	"Eye of the Gorgon" (2 parts, 2007); "The Lost Boy" (2 parts, 2007); "The Last Sontaran" (2 parts, 2008); "The Day of the Clown" (2 parts, 2008); "Enemy of the Bane" (2 parts, 2008); "Prisoner of the Judoon" (2 parts, 2009); "The Eternity Trap" (2 parts, 2009); "Mona Lisa's Revenge" (2 parts, 2009); "The Vault of Secrets" (2 parts, 2010); "Sky" (2 parts, 2011); "The Curse of Clyde Langer" (2 parts, 2011)	CBBC
Torchwood	"Something Borrowed" (2008)	BBC Two
Doctor Who	"The Waters of Mars" (co-written with Russell T Davies) (2009); "Into the Dalek" (co-written with Steven Moffat) (2014)	BBC One
Dreamland	All 6 Episodes (2009)	CBBC
Doctor Who: The Adventure Games	"City of the Daleks" (2010); "Blood of the Cybermen" (2010); "Shadows of the Vashta Nerada" (2010); "The Gunpowder Plot" (2011)	BBC Online
Wizards vs Aliens	"Dawn of the Nekross" (2 parts, 2012); "Grazlax Attacks" (2 parts, 2012); "The Last Day" (2 parts, 2012); "100 Wizards" (2 parts, 2013); "The Thirteenth Floor" (2 parts, 2013); "Endless Night" (2 parts, 2013); "The Secret Of Room 12" (2 parts, 2014); "The Daughters of Stone" (2 parts, 2014); "Twilight Falls" (2 parts, 2014)	CBBC
Tales of the TARDIS	"Vengeance on Varos" (2023); "The Three Doctors" (2023); "The Time Meddler" (2023)	BBC iPlayer
