= Luke Smith (The Sarah Jane Adventures) =

Fictional character

- The Sarah Jane Adventures character
- First appearance: "Invasion of the Bane" (2007)
- Last appearance: The Man Who Never Was (2011)
- Portrayed by: Tommy Knight
- Shared universe appearances: Doctor Who (2008, 2010)

In-universe information
- Species: Augmented Human
- Family: Sarah Jane Smith (adoptive mother); Sky Smith (adoptive sister)
- Spouse: Sanjay
- Home: Earth
- Home era: Early 21st century

Luke Smith is a fictional regular character played by Tommy Knight in the British children's science fiction television series The Sarah Jane Adventures, a spin-off of the long-running series Doctor Who. Luke is a regular character in The Sarah Jane Adventures both in television and audio adventures. He has also appeared in three episodes of Doctor Who: the two-parter "The Stolen Earth"/"Journey's End" (2008), and the Tenth Doctor's finale episode "The End of Time, Part Two" (2010).

Within the narrative of the series, Luke is a human archetype, created by alien species the Bane from thousands of DNA samples, who comes to be adopted by the series' heroine, Sarah Jane Smith (Elisabeth Sladen). Luke is something of a child prodigy, showcasing a remarkable degree of genius but also a level of social ineptitude owing to being born in adolescence.

== Character history ==
=== Introduction ===
Luke Smith is introduced as "the Archetype" in the first episode of The Sarah Jane Adventures, the New Year's Day special "Invasion of the Bane" (2007). The Bane known as Mrs Wormwood (Samantha Bond) creates the Archetype from thousands of samples of DNA taken from visitors touring their Bubble Shock! drink factory. This enables the Bane to run tests on an archetypal human. Luke appears to be an ordinary adolescent boy, except for his lack of a navel having been grown rather than gestated and born naturally. He possesses a superhuman intelligence and an exceptional eidetic memory.

During one tour of the factory, an alarm is set off when visitor Kelsey Hooper's (Porsha Lawrence Mavour) mobile phone disturbs the Bane Mother. The Archetype awakes and proceeds to escape with visitor Maria Jackson (Yasmin Paige) and her investigative journalist neighbour, Sarah Jane Smith (Elisabeth Sladen). After the Bane Mother sends assassins to kill the group, they return to confront the Bane. The Archetype saves the day by recalling an exceptionally long sequence of numbers necessary to trigger an explosion in the Bubble Shock! factory. In the episode's dénouement, Sarah Jane adopts the boy, naming him "Luke Smith", having also considered the names "Harry" and "Alistair" after her friends Harry Sullivan (Ian Marter) and Brigadier Sir Alistair Lethbridge-Stewart (Nicholas Courtney). Her sentient supercomputer Mr Smith (voiced by Alexander Armstrong) forges and distributes all the necessary paperwork to formalise the adoption. Sarah Jane reveals to Luke and Maria that she is a former time traveller, having been a companion of the Doctor (Jon Pertwee and Tom Baker) and lives a dangerous life investigating alien invasions and schemes on Earth.

=== Series ===
Revenge of the Slitheen sets up Series 1 of The Sarah Jane Adventures (2007), depicting Luke's first day at school and his difficulties and early bonding anxieties with Sarah Jane. Luke struggles to adapt to life at school owing to his inability to lie or master humour and his apparent genius-level intellect which sets him apart from his fellow pupils. He and Maria (who is also new to the school having moved recently to the area) meet and befriend Clyde Langer (Daniel Anthony), whilst Luke makes an enemy of Carl (Anton Thompson McCormick), an intelligent boy who envies his effortless intellectual superiority. The friends discover that Carl and three members of staff at the school have been replaced by members of the alien Slitheen family from Raxacoricofallapatorius, and that Luke has assisted unknowingly their plan to switch off the Sun by providing them with the equation they needed to run the machine that will absorb its energy. Luke tricks the Slitheen into resetting their machinery and most of the Slitheen are trapped in their secret room in the school and explode.

Luke, Clyde and Maria assist Sarah Jane against alien Gorgons in their second adventure, and the war-faring alien Uvodni in their third. A plot by extra-dimensional villain the Trickster erases both Luke and his mother from history in the story Whatever Happened to Sarah Jane?, although Maria successfully restores it in the second part.

Sarah Jane is forced to give Luke up in series finale The Lost Boy when a couple allege that Luke is their biological son, casting doubts on his original origin. This later transpires to be a plot by the original Slitheen that Luke believed he had killed, who attempt to harness Luke's latent psychic abilities to telekinetically bring the Moon crashing into the Earth. Luke and Sarah Jane are reunited after their plot is foiled.

Luke is mentioned, but does not appear, in the Doctor Who Series 4 (2008) episode "Turn Left", wherein a plot by the Trickster created an alternate reality where the Doctor is dead. Consequently, Luke, Sarah Jane, Clyde and Maria die in an alternate version of the Doctor Who episode "Smith and Jones". Subsequently, the Doctor Who Series 4 finale features Luke, Sarah Jane, Mr Smith and robot dog K9 witness a Dalek invasion of Earth. With Earth having been transported across space for use in the Daleks' "Reality Bomb", Luke assists the Tenth Doctor (David Tennant) and his associates, through web conferencing, in using the TARDIS in conjunction with Mr Smith and the Cardiff Rift to tow Earth back to its rightful place.

Following this, Series 2 of The Sarah Jane Adventures (2008) sees Luke part ways with Maria when she moves to America in The Last Sontaran, and befriend investigative new girl Rani Chandra (Anjli Mohindra) who comes to discover the extraterrestrial activities that he, Clyde and his mother are involved with in The Day of the Clown. In the Series 2 serial, The Temptation of Sarah Jane Smith, Luke meets his grandparents in a time travel plot set up by the Trickster. In Series 3's The Mad Woman in the Attic (2009), an alien shows Luke a vision of the future in which he appears to be graduating from university at a young age. He meets the Doctor in person for the first time in The Wedding of Sarah Jane Smith and assists him in defeating the Trickster for a third time. Luke is entirely absent from the two-parter The Eternity Trap due to Tommy Knight's real-life school exams. In the series finale The Gift, Luke and Sarah's relationship becomes at times strained by the difficulties of parenting a teenager. Due to infectious alien spores, Luke becomes sick for the first time and nearly dies, spurring Sarah Jane to take up arms against their enemy.

In the final part of the Doctor Who special "The End of Time" (2010), Luke is nearly hit by a car while crossing the road and talking on his mobile phone; he is saved by the Doctor prior to his pending regeneration. The Doctor then waves to Sarah Jane and Luke before stepping into his TARDIS and disappearing. At the beginning of The Sarah Jane Adventures Series 4 (2010), Luke is written out during the episode The Nightmare Man as the character departs to attend the University of Oxford after having taken his A Levels ahead of schedule, although makes regular cameo appearances episode-to-episode in communicating with his friends and mother via webcam. In the series finale, Goodbye, Sarah Jane Smith, Luke makes a full appearance in part two. He drives down from Oxford to assist Rani and Clyde against nefarious alien Ruby White (Julie Graham), who has his mother held captive. He puts his intelligence to good use, and with some long-distance assistance from K-9 (who is based in Oxford), he defeats Ruby and saves his mother. He also appears in the Series 5 opener, Sky (2011), on a web cam, his clothes subsequently being lent to Sky Smith (Sinead Michael), another genetically engineered child who becomes Luke's adopted sister at the episode's conclusion. He makes a final appearance in the series finale, The Man Who Never Was. When Luke visits from Oxford, he and Sky finally meet one another in person and bond for the first time.

=== "Farewell, Sarah Jane" ===
Luke appears in "Farewell, Sarah Jane" (2020), an epilogue for the series. Set several years after the events of the main series, Luke has come out as gay, is happily married to Sanjay and is now working for UNIT. While in Geneva, Luke learns that Sarah Jane has passed away and along with Clyde and Rani, he organises her funeral where everyone is celebrating Sarah Jane's life.

=== Audio ===
Knight reprised his role in 2023 for the second volume of Rani Takes on the World, a Big Finish audio-drama spinoff set fifteen years after the events of The Sarah Jane Adventures, reuniting with his former castmates Anjili Mohindra (Rani) and Daniel Anthony (Clyde). Luke was mentioned in the series' first volume "Beyond Bannerman Road" but does not appear. The second volume, "The Revenge of Wormwood", was released in December 2023 and features the return of Samantha Bond as Mrs. Wormwood.

== Planned character developments ==
If the series not been prematurely ended by Sladen's death, Davies had intended for Luke to be gay. References had been made to Luke's friend Sanjay, whom Davies intended would be introduced properly as Luke's boyfriend. Although this was a development suggested by the network (CBBC), Davies still ultimately chose to cut a line which hinted at this development in the Luke-centric two-parter The Nightmare Man. The cut line is from the scene in which Luke saying goodbye to Sarah Jane as he departs for university.

Sarah Jane: Have a lovely time at university. You’ll grow up, you’ll find a girlfriend.
Luke: (off-handedly): Oh, could be a boyfriend!
Sarah Jane: Well, as long as it’s not a Slitheen, I don’t care!

— Cut lines from "The Nightmare Man," as remembered by writer Russell T Davies.

Luke was selected by Davies because producers "wanted us to have a gay character on children's BBC. Just a normal gay character," and Luke fit this description. Dave Golder of SFX was critical of this reasoning, and felt that a character of non-alien origins or without special abilities, such as Clyde, would have emphasised normality better. By contrast, editors at Hypable felt that "in hindsight," a number of Luke's "socially awkward scenes" from earlier in the series "could be seen to have forecast Luke's sexual orientation, and they even inspired some fan fiction of that sort."

The mini episode Farewell, Sarah Jane, published on the official Doctor Who YouTube channel confirmed Luke's sexuality when he states that he and Sanjay have been married for five years.
