= Sarah Jane Smith =

Fictional character from Doctor Who and The Sarah Jane Adventures

- Doctor Who character
- Sarah Jane Smith in "School Reunion" (2006)
- First appearance: The Time Warrior (1973)
- Last appearance: The Man Who Never Was (2011)
- Portrayed by: Elisabeth Sladen
- Voiced by: Elisabeth Sladen (2002–2011); Sadie Miller (2021–present)
- Shared universe appearances: K-9 and Company (1981); Downtime (1995); The Sarah Jane Adventures (2007–2011)
- Duration: 1973–1976, 1981, 1983, 1993, 1995, 2006–2011

In-universe information
- Full name: Sarah Jane Smith
- Occupation: Journalist
- Affiliation: Third Doctor; Fourth Doctor; Tenth Doctor; Eleventh Doctor; K9; UNIT
- Family: Eddie Smith (father); Barbara Smith (mother)
- Children: Luke Smith (adoptive son); Sky Smith (adoptive daughter)
- Relatives: Lavinia Smith (aunt)
- Origin: Foxgrove, Herefordshire, England
- Home era: 20th and 21st centuries

Sarah Jane Smith is a fictional character played by Elisabeth Sladen in the long-running BBC television series Doctor Who and two of its televised spin-offs. Sarah Jane is a dogged investigative journalist who encounters the Doctor, an alien time traveller, and becomes his travelling companion on a series of adventures throughout space and time. After parting ways with the Doctor, she continues working as a journalist, uncovering sinister developments on Earth, and defending the planet from alien invasions alongside her neighbours. She occasionally reunites with the Doctor during her own adventures.

Sarah Jane was introduced in the 1973 Doctor Who serial The Time Warrior as a new companion of Jon Pertwee's Third Doctor; Sladen continued in the role after Tom Baker took over the lead part. After four seasons, she made her final regular appearance in The Hand of Fear (1976). Sladen reprised the role in the spin-off television pilot K-9 and Company (1981), the 20th-anniversary Doctor Who episode "The Five Doctors" (1983), the 30th-anniversary television special Dimensions in Time (1993) and the direct-to-video spin-off film Downtime (1995). Sladen also reprised the role in audio dramas, co-starring with Pertwee in the The Paradise of Death (1993) and The Ghosts of N-Space (1996), and starring in Big Finish Productions' licensed spin-off series Sarah Jane Smith (2002–2006).

After Doctor Who's television revival in 2005, Sladen reprised the role in "School Reunion" (2006) opposite David Tennant's Tenth Doctor and made further guest appearances from 2008 to 2010. She starred in a CBBC television spin-off series, The Sarah Jane Adventures (2007–2011), which included guest appearances by the then-incumbent actors to play the Doctor, Tennant and Matt Smith. Because of Sladen's ill health, and her death in April 2011, production on the latter half of series 5 of The Sarah Jane Adventures was postponed and later cancelled. The webisode special "Farewell, Sarah Jane" (2020), written by the former Doctor Who showrunner Russell T Davies, established the character's death. Since 2021, Sladen's daughter Sadie Miller has voiced the character in Big Finish's audio dramas.

Sarah Jane is consistently ranked among the most popular Doctor Who companions. Often described as the first feminist companion, Sladen was praised by critics for bringing more depth to the role than had been seen on the series. The Doctor Who writer Toby Whithouse credited the character for redefining the role of the companion "from being a rather helpless hysteric to being a feisty, opinionated, strong equal to the Doctor". Sarah Jane is also one of the Doctor's longest-serving companions.

== Appearances ==
=== Television ===
==== 1973–1976, 1981, 1983; introduction and classic run ====
Sarah Jane in a publicity photo from Planet of Evil (1975)

Sarah Jane first appears in the Third Doctor serial The Time Warrior (1973–74), where she has managed to infiltrate a top secret research facility by posing as her aunt, Lavinia Smith, a famous virologist. Introduced as an ardent feminist, Sarah Jane sneaks aboard the TARDIS and becomes embroiled in a battle against a militaristic alien Sontaran in the Middle Ages who is kidnapping scientists from the present day. Subsequently, she accompanies The Doctor (Jon Pertwee) on several journeys in the TARDIS, and she also assists the United Nations Intelligence Taskforce led by Brigadier Lethbridge-Stewart (Nicholas Courtney) on a number of occasions. After Pertwee's departure, Sladen remains following Season 11 finale Planet of the Spiders (1974), in which The Doctor regenerates into the Fourth Doctor (Tom Baker). In season 12's consecutive 1975 serials The Sontaran Experiment, Genesis of the Daleks and Revenge of the Cybermen, Sarah and male companion Harry Sullivan (Ian Marter) face the series' three iconic recurring creatures, the Sontarans, the Daleks and the Cybermen. In Genesis Sarah is present at the creation of the Daleks and meets their creator, Davros (Michael Wisher). Sarah Jane departs in the Season 14 serial The Hand of Fear (1976) after The Doctor receives a summons to his home planet, Gallifrey. Sladen has described Sarah as "a bit of a cardboard cut-out. Each week it used to be, 'Yes Doctor, no Doctor'..."

Sladen declined an offer to return as Sarah Jane for Baker's final story, Logopolis (1981), and the following season. However, she agreed to reprise the role in a pilot episode for an Earth-based spin-off series, K-9 and Company, later in 1981. In the pilot episode, titled "A Girl's Best Friend", Sarah Jane receives the robot dog K9 Mark III (John Leeson) as a Christmas present from The Doctor. The pilot did not lead to a series, but the character reappeared in Doctor Who for the 1983 twentieth anniversary story "The Five Doctors", in which she is transported to Gallifrey by Lord President Borusa (Philip Latham) to take part in the Game of Rassilon in The Death Zone devised by Time Lord founder Rassilon (Richard Mathews). Here, Sarah is reunited with the Third Doctor, and also meets the First, Second and Fifth. "The Five Doctors" shows that Sarah Jane still owns and is working with K9. The character made an appearance in the 1993 Children in Need special (a crossover with long-running British soap EastEnders), Dimensions in Time, wherein various Doctors and companions are teleported to Albert Square as part of a plot by the Rani (Kate O'Mara). Though Sladen would not make any more official Doctor Who television appearances until 2006, in the interval the actress reprised her role as Sarah Jane twice on BBC radio with Jon Pertwee, and in a series of Big Finish audio dramas, and in the unofficial direct-to-video spin-off film Downtime (1995) alongside the Brigadier, Second Doctor companion Victoria Waterfield (Deborah Watling) and Leeson in a rare on-screen role.

==== 2006–2011, 2020, 2023, 2024; revived series and spin-off ====
Following Russell T Davies' 2005 Doctor Who revival, Sladen returned to the show in the Series 2 episode "School Reunion" (2006). "School Reunion" revisits Sarah Jane, still working alongside K9 since "The Five Doctors", when she encounters the Tenth Doctor (David Tennant) while they both investigate mysterious goings on at a school run by Headmaster Finch (Anthony Head). Exposition in the episode reveals that, having waited years for The Doctor to return to her, Sarah Jane assumed he had died, though later came to suspect his involvement when witnessing the alien spaceship above London in Doctor Who Christmas special "The Christmas Invasion". On meeting Sarah Jane, current companion Rose Tyler (Billie Piper) reflects on her future after The Doctor. Though K9 Mark III still assists Sarah Jane, he has fallen into disrepair; after K9 Mark III sacrifices himself to save Sarah Jane and The Doctor, The Doctor leaves Sarah Jane a new K9 model, K9 Mark IV, and takes her advice by inviting Rose's boyfriend Mickey Smith (Noel Clarke) aboard the TARDIS as his second companion. The success of "School Reunion" led to the development of The Sarah Jane Adventures, starring Sladen as Sarah Jane, produced by BBC Wales for CBBC.

In The Sarah Jane Adventures, Sarah Jane investigates alien activity covertly from her manor house in Bannerman Road in Ealing, driving an emerald green Nissan Figaro and with the help of her sentient supercomputer Mr Smith (voice of comedian Alexander Armstrong), as well as an alien activity scanner and sonic lipstick device. In the special premiere episode "Invasion of the Bane" (2007), Sarah Jane adopts a son: Bane creation, genetic archetype and boy genius Luke Smith (Tommy Knight), and befriends her neighbour Maria Jackson (Yasmin Paige) during her investigation of Bane leader Mrs Wormwood (Samantha Bond). Sarah Jane remarks that since meeting them she is no longer content to live alone; she discloses she never married after parting from the Fourth Doctor, to whom no one could ever compare. Sometime between "School Reunion" and "Invasion of the Bane", K9 has left Sarah Jane to close off a black hole, occasionally passing close enough to contact her; due to the concurrent development of the K-9 television series, to which creator Bob Baker owns the rights, K9 only appears in two episodes of the first series. In the first series, Sarah Jane learns how to be a mother to Luke, the while strengthening her friendship with teenage neighbour Maria, the person Sarah Jane "trusts the most". Along with Luke and his friend Clyde Langer (Daniel Anthony) they defeat and repel various threats to the contemporary Earth. Among these threats, series one introduces The Trickster (Paul Marc Davis), a cosmic being who makes alterations to the timeline to cause chaos and destruction; he becomes a recurring adversary for Sarah Jane. Sarah Jane finds a new enemy in the Slitheen, a family of criminal aliens originally seen in Doctor Who, and an ally in alien research scientist Professor Rivers (Floella Benjamin). Time travel scenes also depict 13-year-old Sarah Jane (Jessica Ashworth), for whom the death of her best friend Andrea Yates (Jane Asher) gave Sarah Jane her resolve to fight against loss of life.

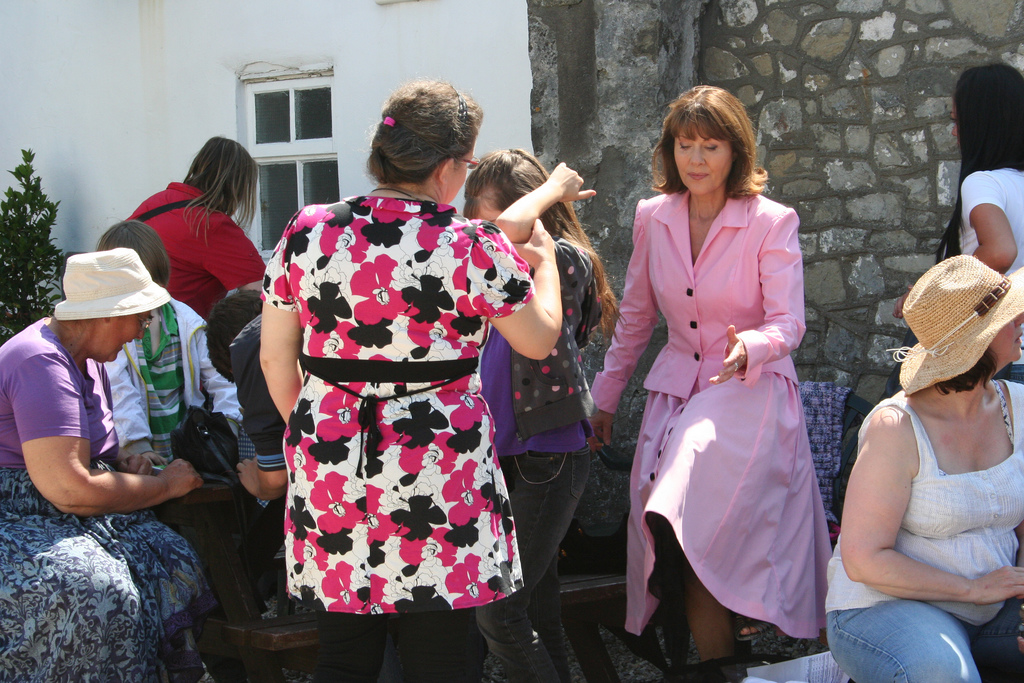
Sladen during filming for The Sarah Jane Adventures in 2008

Sarah Jane then reappears in Doctor Who in the two-part fourth series finale episodes "The Stolen Earth" and "Journey's End" (2008), which crosses over from Torchwood and The Sarah Jane Adventures. When Daleks invade Earth, Sarah Jane is summoned along with UNIT officer Martha Jones (Freema Agyeman) and Torchwood leader Captain Jack Harkness (John Barrowman) by former PM Harriet Jones (Penelope Wilton) to help The Doctor save the universe. On the Dalek ship Davros (Julian Bleach) recognises Sarah Jane from their encounter in the classic series' episode Genesis of the Daleks. In The Sarah Jane Adventures second series (2008), Maria moves away to America in The Last Sontaran, and Sarah Jane befriends new neighbour Rani Chandra (Anjli Mohindra) in The Day of the Clown; the same episode features flashbacks to Sarah Jane's (Jessica Mogridge) childhood in her Aunt Lavinia's home. In The Temptation of Sarah Jane Smith, Sarah Jane saves the lives of her parents, Eddie (Christopher Pizzey) and Barbara (Rosanna Lavelle) in 1951; by doing so she plays into The Trickster's hands, creating a post-apocalyptic alternative universe in the present day. Learning of this however, her parents choose to die, becoming heroes to restore the timeline. In series two finale Enemy of the Bane, Sarah Jane's old friend Brigadier Lethbridge-Stewart (Nicholas Courtney) from UNIT assists her against united adversaries Mrs Wormwood and Sontaran Commander Kaagh (Anthony O'Donnell). Sarah Jane feels threatened on a personal level by Mrs Wormwood's claim to be Luke's mother as his creator. Sladen has relatively scarce screen-time in "Sarah Jane-lite" serial The Mark of the Berserker due to back-to-back filming. Though K9 makes no appearances in series two, he appears to assist Sarah Jane against Ambassador Ranius (Ronnie Corbett) in a mini-episode for Comic Relief (2009).

In series three (2009), Sarah Jane makes a new enemy in the body-stealing alien Androvax (Mark Goldthorp) as well as a lukewarm ally in the form of the interplanetary police force, the Judoon (from Doctor Who). In the second two-parter, Sarah Jane is able to recover K9 full-time (reflecting a real-world deal struck with the creators of the children's series K-9). In a crossover with the parent show, Sarah Jane reveals her intention to marry her secret fiancé, barrister Peter Dalton, in The Wedding of Sarah Jane Smith. However, Dalton's involvement in Sarah Jane's life proves to be a scheme of The Trickster. The Doctor gatecrashes the wedding to foil The Trickster's plot to make Sarah Jane give up on alien hunting, and explains to Sarah Jane that The Trickster is a powerful member of the extra-dimensional so-called Pantheon of Discord. The serial clarifies that Sarah Jane owes her independent wealth to her Aunt Lavina's will. In 'Sarah-lite' two-parter Mona Lisa's Revenge, Sarah Jane and Luke have their first argument as he progresses into his teenage years; they argue about the cleanliness of Luke's room. In series finale The Gift, though she is reluctant to use weapons or cause harm, when Luke falls deathly ill for the first time ever due to the machinations of the Blathereen-Slitheen, Sarah Jane takes up arms to confront them. In the episode's conclusion, regretfully she is forced to kill them using Mr Smith.

Sarah Jane next appears in the Tenth Doctor two-part Doctor Who finale, "The End of Time", in 2010. When The Doctor is slowly dying from radiation poisoning, he makes timely visits to his close friends and companions; The Doctor saves Luke's life from an oncoming car on Bannerman Road (an inside joke by Russell T Davies commenting on actors' failure to look for cars before crossing the street because traffic is always stopped for them, something that he believes is especially important in a children's show) and bids a silent farewell to Luke and to Sarah Jane.

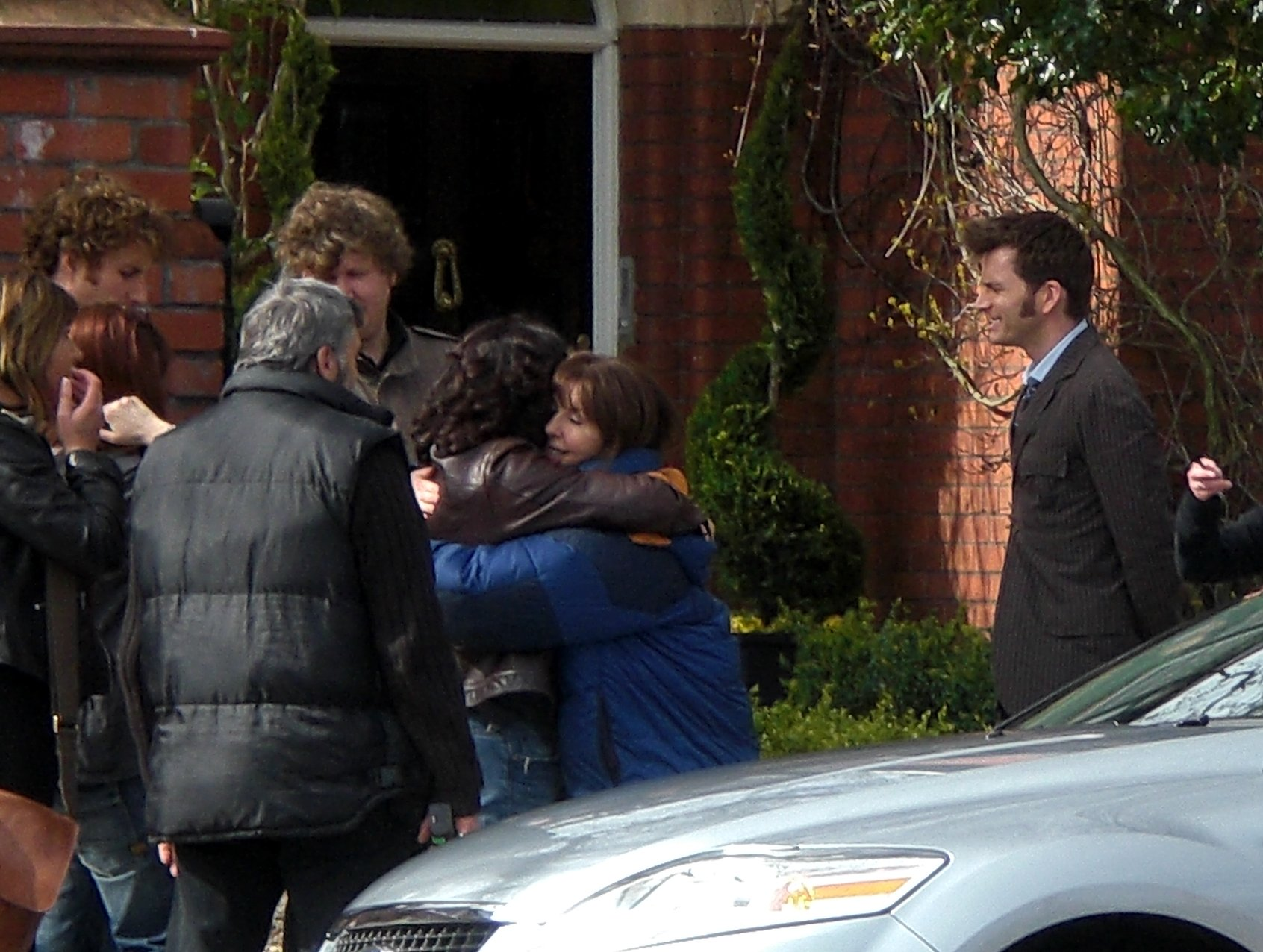
Sladen hugging executive producer Julie Gardner, with David Tennant, during production on The End of Time. Two further series of The Sarah Jane Adventures were released after this, but this was Sarah Jane's final appearance on Doctor Who.

In the fourth season (2010) of The Sarah Jane Adventures, Sarah Jane sees Luke off to university in the first two-parter of the series, but continues her adventures alongside Rani and Clyde. The trio encounter the Eleventh Doctor (Matt Smith), as well as Sarah Jane's immediate predecessor as The Doctor's companion, Jo Grant (Katy Manning), in Death of the Doctor; aliens known as the Shansheeth fake The Doctor's death as part of a plot to gain access to the TARDIS using Jo and Sarah Jane's memories. The Empty Planet is this series' 'Sarah-lite' serial; with the rest of the population, Sarah Jane mysteriously vanishes, leaving Rani and Clyde to investigate without her. In Lost in Time, Sarah Jane is sent back in time on a mission from the mysterious Shopkeeper (Cyril Nri). Sarah Jane is convinced to retire by an alien plot in the series finale, earning a new nemesis and doppelgänger in Ruby White (Julie Graham); she is saved from Ruby when Luke drives down from university to her rescue.

Sladen's death ended the show in the middle of its fifth series, which aired in 2011. In its premiere story, Sarah Jane adopts a new child in the form of Sky Smith (Sinead Michael), a genetically-engineered alien girl with abilities relating to electromagnetism; the Shopkeeper arranged for their encounter, but declines to explain his motives to Sarah Jane. Sarah Jane's final broadcast appearance comes in series five finale The Man Who Never Was. The final story ends with a short montage of archive footage and audio recordings celebrating Sarah Jane's journey from lone investigator to mother of two surrounded by friends. The series ends with the final caption: "And the story goes on... forever."

The cast and writers of The Sarah Jane Adventures produced a special 2020 webcast epilogue for the show with a mix of narrated and acted elements entitled "Farewell, Sarah Jane". In the story, Sarah Jane's friends and many past companions of the Doctor return to London to attend her funeral. At the end of the webcast, Rani and Mr Smith speculate whether Sarah Jane actually did not die and instead went to travel the universe with the Doctor once more.

In the 60th Anniversary special, "The Giggle", it is confirmed that Sarah Jane has died. In the episode, the newly bi-generated Fifteenth Doctor reminisces with the Fourteenth Doctor about all the loss that they have suffered up to that point in their lives. Among the names and events mentioned, the Fifteenth Doctor mentions that Sarah Jane is gone and both Doctors express their love for her.

In the Tales of the TARDIS spin-off episode "Pyramids of Mars", the Fifteenth Doctor tells his companion Ruby Sunday (Millie Gibson) about Sarah Jane and that they were best friends and told her that she travelled with him during his first encounter with Sutekh. It is later revealed that the conversation took place during the events of "Empire of Death".

=== Literature ===
Sarah Jane appears in several Doctor Who novels and short stories, notably in the Eighth Doctor Adventures novels Interference: Book One and Interference: Book Two by Lawrence Miles; and the Past Doctor Adventures novel Bullet Time by David A. McIntee, all taking place after she stops travelling with The Doctor. She appears in Ian Marter's Harry Sullivan's War published by Target Books; Marter played companion Harry Sullivan in seven television serials. Different accounts of Sarah Jane's life have been given in the Doctor Who literature. Interference and the Virgin New Adventures novel Christmas on a Rational Planet, also by Miles, suggest that Sarah Jane married someone named Paul Morley sometime between 1996 and 1998 and took his name. In the short story "Lily" by Jackie Marshall, in Big Finish's Short Trips: A Christmas Treasury, the Fifth Doctor pays a visit to an older Sarah Jane, who has a daughter, Lauren, and an autistic granddaughter, Lily; Lauren's father is named Will. In the Past Doctor Adventure Bullet Time, Sarah Jane is apparently killed—although the story is ambiguous about whether she actually dies—in 1997 when she sacrifices herself so that she cannot be used as a hostage to stop the Seventh Doctor from taking action to aid an escaping alien ship, contradicting her other spin-off appearances. However, the novel takes place during a story arc where enemies of The Doctor were attempting to eliminate his companions from the Timeline (revealed in the later novel Sometime Never...), and Sarah Jane's death may have been reversed when those enemies are defeated. In any case, other stories have shown her alive after 1997. Sarah Jane was mentioned in the prologue of the Virgin Publishing novelisation of The Power of the Daleks by John Peel. It revealed that Sarah Jane was working as UNIT's official chronicler and that in "1996" she covered the aftermath of the Cybermen's failed attempt to drain Earth of its energy and the technology left behind in their wake (The Tenth Planet, which was actually set in 1986).

Stories written as in-universe articles in Doctor Who Magazine Winter Special 1991 (subtitled "UNIT Exposed"), made statements about Sarah Jane's life after leaving the Fourth Doctor. She wrote a history of UNIT, Fighting for Humankind ("heavily vetted and evidently subjected to considerable censorship"), as well as a series of science fiction novels. These featured an extraterrestrial called The Doctor and his companion Nicola Jones, who frequently encountered WIN (World Investigative Network), commanded by General Lutwidge-Douglas. Titles included Day of the Dinosaurs, Sutekh the Destroyer and The North Sea Monster.

Another in-universe article was written by Kevin W. Parker, Roving Reporter, which was a biography of Sarah Jane from her childhood to the early 1990s. She grew up with her aunt Lavinia after her parents died in a car crash. She went to Caterham School For Girls and the University of Nottingham. She was engaged to Andrew Lofts, an aspiring television journalist; it didn't last. She ended up working with UNIT; her exact duties were never described. In the spring of 1981, she left UNIT after being hospitalised from an accident in a quarry. Afterwards she developed a romantic relationship with Harry Sullivan; they parted amicably and were still very fond of each other, and were still close friends, even to the time of the article. She wrote science fiction novels World War Skaro and The Monster at the End of Space which made it onto the Times and New York Times bestseller lists.

Though there are as yet no original Sarah Jane Adventures novels, many of the television episodes have been novelised.

=== Audio drama ===
Between seasons 13 and 14, Sladen appeared as Sarah Jane, with Tom Baker as the Fourth Doctor, in the audio play The Pescatons, released on LP by The Decca Record Company Limited in 1976. She also appeared with Baker in "The Time Machine", episode three of the BBC Radio 4 series Exploration Earth broadcast on 4 October 1976. Also in 1976 she appeared as Sarah Jane alongside Tom Baker's Doctor in the first ever BBC Enterprises audio spin-off from Doctor Who: a cassette and LP release of an abridged version of Genesis of the Daleks, narrated by Baker. Sarah Jane (played by Sladen) appeared in two BBC Radio plays starring Jon Pertwee as the Doctor in the 1990s: The Paradise of Death and The Ghosts of N-Space.

She also appears, voiced by Sladen, in her own range of Big Finish audio dramas, consisting of nine stories released between 2002 and 2006. This series came to an unexpected end when the character was given her own television series, The Sarah Jane Adventures, detailed above. There are loose allusions to the audio series in the television series, including Sarah Jane's ownership of a Volkswagen.

Sarah Jane appears in two audio stories based on The Sarah Jane Adventures, released in November 2007 on CD: The Glittering Storm by Stephen Cole and The Thirteenth Stone by Justin Richards, with both stories read by series star Elisabeth Sladen. This is the first time that BBC Audiobooks have commissioned new content for exclusive release on audio. Further pairs of audio stories were released every year until 2010, again all read by Sladen. In 2011, two audio stories were read by Daniel Anthony and Anjii Mohindra.

Sladen's daughter Sadie Miller took over the role of Sarah Jane Smith for Big Finish audio dramas in 2021, first in Return of the Cybermen in March, a reworking of Gerry Davis' 1974 original script which was eventually filmed as Revenge of the Cybermen, with Tom Baker as the fourth Doctor; and then in The Third Doctor Adventures in May, with Tim Treloar as the third Doctor.

The canonicity of Sarah Jane's appearances in the audio dramas is, like all Doctor Who spin-off media, unclear, and they may not even take place in the same continuity as one another. For example, the novels' mention of Sarah Jane as having been married is contradicted by the later Sarah Jane Smith audio play Dreamland, and the Sarah Jane Adventures episode "Invasion of the Bane".

== Development ==
=== Casting ===
April Walker and Jon Pertwee in a 1968 publicity photo for Oh Clarence!

The Doctor Who production team began developing plans for a new companion to the Third Doctor (Jon Pertwee) after Jo Grant (Katy Manning)'s exit from the series in The Green Death (1973). Robert Holmes, writer of the new companion's introductory story The Time Warrior (1973-4), gave her the name "Smith". 29-year-old actress April Walker successfully auditioned for Doctor Who producer Barry Letts at the BBC rehearsal rooms in Acton, and she was contracted on 14 March 1973 to appear in all five stories of season 11. Walker had previously worked with Pertwee in a 1968 West End production of Oh, Clarence! Walker received scripts for the upcoming episodes and was fitted for her costumes. However, Pertwee returned from location filming for The Green Death and was unhappy that his new co-star had been cast in his absence. He considered Walker unsuitable for the role, reportedly stating that she was too tall and mature, and expressing a preference for a younger, shorter co-star. Walker claimed that Pertwee feared audiences would perceive their dynamic as having sexual undertones, rather than the father-daughter dynamic he wanted. Letts released Walker from her contract on 29 March; she was paid in full and required to be on first call to the BBC for the length of season 11's production. Any money earned would be discounted from her contracted fee. Letts later cast Walker in a 1976 television adaptation of The Prince and the Pauper. Walker found the ordeal a "very big disappointment" and was sworn to secrecy; her identity was not revealed until the 2012 DVD release of Invasion of the Dinosaurs (1974).

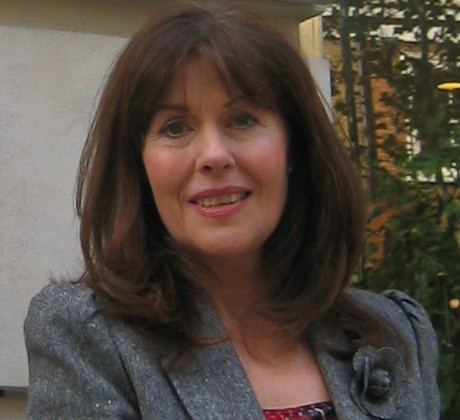
Elisabeth Sladen (pictured in 2003) played Sarah Jane Smith.

Letts began another batch of auditions. Z-Cars producer Ron Craddock recommended that he consider actress Elisabeth Sladen, who had impressed him with her performance in two episodes of that series. Sladen was the final actress to interview for the role. Letts was impressed and had Sladen audition alongside actor Stephen Thorne at the Acton rehearsal rooms on 13 April. Letts arranged for her to meet Pertwee, then rehearsing for The Green Death in a nearby room. Pertwee stood behind Sladen and gave a thumbs-up to Letts, who offered her the role. Production on The Time Warrior began less than a month later, on 7 May.

By January 1976, Sladen had informed the production team of her decision to leave the series. She had originally planned to work on the series for just over a year, and after three seasons she felt that there were fewer territories to explore in the character. Sladen also wanted to avoid reaching a point where the production team would ask her to leave. Sladen requested that Sarah Jane not be killed off, fearing it would upset the character's many young fans. She also opposed having Sarah Jane married off, as she felt it did not fit the style of the series. Sladen's departure was announced on 13 May 1976, and her final regular episode as the Doctor's companion was in the final episode of The Hand of Fear on 23 October 1976. At the time, no companion had returned to Doctor Who.

Around 1980, Sladen turned down an offer by new Doctor Who producer John Nathan-Turner to return to the series as Sarah Jane. Instead, Nathan-Turner brought back Sladen for a spin-off television pilot, K-9 and Company, which aired in December 1981. Sladen returned for the 20th-anniversary Doctor Who special "The Five Doctors".

Sladen made a small appearance in the thirtieth-anniversary television special Dimensions in Time (1993), a Doctor Who and EastEnders charity crossover for Children in Need, alongside many other companion actors. She also reprised the role in the five-part radio serial The Paradise of Death (1993), written by Barry Letts and featuring past co-stars Jon Pertwee and Nicholas Courtney. The story was well-received and peaked at 48 in the album charts, leading to a sequel, The Ghosts of N-Space (1996). She also appeared in the direct-to-video spin-off film Downtime (1995).

=== Characterisation ===
Following April Walker's departure from the role, the production team further developed the new companion character. She was given the forenames "Sarah Jane" and made an investigative journalist. She was also deliberately made more progressive than Jo Grant as a point of differentiation. Letts noted in Sladen's audition that her combination of fear and bravery made her an perfect audience surrogate.

Doctor Who researcher John Ainsworth noted that, after Tom Baker became the Doctor, Sladen's "tough, feminist journalist softened into a more whimsical performance".

== Reception and influence ==
=== Reception ===
Sarah Jane Smith was consistently voted the most popular Doctor Who companion until the advent of the new series in 2005. Even in more recent times the character has continued to vie in popularity with Rose Tyler, Donna Noble, and Ace. Sladen felt that part of her popularity was working alongside Pertwee and Baker, who were popular Doctors. Daniel Martin of The Guardian named her the best companion in 2007, writing that her "jolly-hockey-sticks good nature" made her so beloved. The Daily Telegraph's Gavin Fuller also ranked Sarah Jane number one, praising Sladen's portrayal and saying that she displayed "great determination and bravery". Critics for The Guardian praised Sladen for bringing more depth to the role of the companion than had previously been seen on the series.

Mark Braxton praised Sladen's chemistry with Tom Baker, stating that "Baker's personality was an unusual, even awkward one to dovetail. But Sladen always managed it skilfully, and arguably better than any companion who followed. The reward for her popularity with viewers was not just one spin-off but two!" In 2018, Doctor Who researcher Mark Wright declared Sarah Jane Smith and the Fourth Doctor "still the best pairing in the history of Doctor Who".

=== Impact ===
Sarah Jane Smith is often described as the first feminist companion. In 2012, Toby Whithouse, who wrote Sarah Jane's return to the series in "School Reunion", said she was his favourite companion from the classic series. Concerning the impact of the character, he said:

"Because she was a comic companion; and I think that she, more than any other before her, redefined the role of the companion. And there are elements of Sarah Jane Smith that you can see in every companion afterward down to Amy. She changed the companion from being a rather helpless hysteric to being a feisty, opinionated, strong equal to The Doctor. And, at the time, you know that was quite an extraordinary thing to do. That was not the role the companion, or women, were meant to be playing. They were meant to be playing the victim, they were meant to be decoration. I think what Lis Sladen did with that character is quite extraordinary. We forget how revolutionary she was at the time."
