= Yasmin Paige =

British actress

- Born: 1991 or 1992 (age 34–35); London, England
- Occupation: Actress
- Years active: 2003–present
- Notable work: The Sarah Jane Adventures (2007–2008)

Yasmin Paige (born 1991) is an English actress. She played the film role of Jordana Bevan in Submarine (2010), and has appeared on television as Beth Mitchell in Pramface (2012–2014), and Maria Jackson in The Sarah Jane Adventures (2007–2008).

== Life and career ==
Paige was born in London, 1991, to a Jewish mother and Muslim Arab Iraqi father. She has acted since the age of four and made her screen debut in the 2003 film Wondrous Oblivion. Paige also starred in The Mysti Show and had a reduced role in the second series of The Sarah Jane Adventures to accommodate her GCSE exams.

Paige appeared as one of the leads, Petrova Fossil, in Ballet Shoes, and co-starred as Jordana Bevan in the 2010 film Submarine. In February and March 2012, she played Beth Mitchell in the six-part BBC Three comedy Pramface and returned to this role for a second series in 2013. She appeared as Nicky in the Channel 4 drama Spoof or Die, which aired on 30 July 2012. In 2014, she had the main role in the E4 teen drama Glue.

== Filmography ==
=== Television ===
Year	Title	Role	Network	Notes
Unknown	Bed & Breakfast Star	Elsa	BBC	
Unknown	Smack the Pony	Birthday Girl	Channel 4	
Unknown	The Search	Lost Child	BBC	
2003	Keen Eddie	April Kinney	Fox	"Eddie Loves Baseball " Series 1, Episode 4
2004	The Mysti Show	Abi	BBC One	All of Series 1 and some episodes of series 2
2004	The Last Detective	Katy Berisha	ITV1	"Dangerous and the Lonely Hearts" Series 2, Episode 4
2004	Doctors	Kerry Barclay	BBC One	"Look Both Ways" Series 6, Episode 14
2005	The Golden Hour	Cherry Dean	ITV1	Series 1, Episode 3
2007–2008	The Sarah Jane Adventures	Maria Jackson	CBBC	Appeared in every story of Series 1, as listed below: Invasion of the Bane; Revenge of the Slitheen; Eye of the Gorgon; Warriors of Kudlak; Whatever Happened to Sarah Jane?; The Lost Boy; Series 2 stories: The Last Sontaran; The Mark of the Berserker (Minor Part; Guest Appearance); Filmed at various locations in Cardiff, Wales
2007	My Life as a Popat	Lucy Miesels	ITV1	"Ghost " Series 2, Episode 3
2007	Secret Life	Michaela	Channel 4	Released on DVD: 19 April 2007 (UK)
2007	Ballet Shoes	Petrova Fossil	BBC One	
2009	Murderland	Jessica	ITV1	Series 1, Episode 1-3
2012–2014	Pramface	Beth Mitchell	BBC Three	Series 1-3
2014	Glue	Ruth	E4	Main cast
2017	The Good Karma Hospital	Josie Young	ITV1	Series 1, Episode 6
2025	Testament	Mara	Angel	7 episodes

=== Radio ===
Year	Title	Role	Radio Station/Production Company	Notes
Unknown	The Meeting Point	Noor	BBC Belfast for BBC	Audio Story
Unknown	The Little Toe Radio	Narrator	BBC Radio 7	
Unknown	Topic Chocolate Bars	Voice Over	BBC Radio/Film 400	Advert
2013	Neil Gaiman's Neverwhere	Anaesthesia, Tenant 2 – female, and Match girl	BBC Radio 4 and BBC Radio 4 Extra	N/A
2017	The Book of Yehudit	Yehudit	BBC Radio 4	

=== Film ===
Year	Title	Role
2000	Z	Princess Sara
2001	The Others	Bridesmaid
2003	Wondrous Oblivion	Liliana
2003	Second Nature	Ibrahim's Daughter
2004	Tooth	Tooth
2005	The Keeper: The Legend of Omar Khayyam	Young Darya
2006	True True Lie	Young Dana
2007	I Could Never Be Your Woman	Melanie
2010	Submarine	Jordana Bevan
2013	The Double	Melanie Papadopoulos
2014	The Possibilities are Endless	Young Grace
2015	Chicken	Annabell
2016	Ramona & The Chair	Ramona
2021	The Souvenir Part II	Patrick's Assistant

=== Theatre ===
Year	Title	Role	Notes
2003	Les Misérables	Cosette	Shown at Palace Theatre London This earned her a nomination as Best Performer in the Annual Children's Entertainment Awards.
2010	Spur of the Moment	Emma G	Shown at Royal Court Theatre.
Unknown	Romeo & Juliet	Juliet	Shown at Bloomsbury Theatre.
Unknown	Annie	Molly	Shown at Hammersmith Theatre.
2018	Circle Mirror Transformation	Lauren	Shown at HOME (Manchester).
