= List of The Sarah Jane Adventures serials =

Serials of British science fiction show

The Sarah Jane Adventures logo

The Sarah Jane Adventures is a British science fiction television programme created by Russell T Davies for the British Broadcasting Corporation (BBC). Phil Ford served as the show's head writer. It is a spin-off of the long-running television production Doctor Who. Compared to Doctor Who's family-oriented viewership, The Sarah Jane Adventures is targeted towards a younger audience. The show centres around its titular character, Sarah Jane Smith (portrayed by Elisabeth Sladen), an investigative journalist and former time-travelling companion of the Doctor.

Sladen starred in Doctor Who from 1973–1976 and returned to the programme several times prior to the spin-off. In 2006, she made her first appearance in the revived era of Doctor Who by guest starring in the second series episode "School Reunion", which was retroactively viewed as a backdoor pilot. The Sarah Jane Adventures was the second attempt at a spin-off featuring Sladen, the first being K-9 and Company which never made it past the pilot stage in 1981. Now, living in modern-day Ealing, London, Smith investigates extraterrestrial matters and protects Earth against alien threats with a group of teenage accomplices: her adopted son Luke Smith, neighbour Maria Jackson, and friend Clyde Langer. New neighbour Rani Chandra and adopted daughter Sky Smith later join the cast. Additionally, the group is aided by Mr Smith, a sentient extraterrestrial computer, and K9, a dog-shaped robot gifted to Sarah Jane by the Doctor.

The Sarah Jane Adventures was introduced in a 60-minute special episode broadcast on New Year's Day in 2007 on BBC One. It was followed later in the year by a 10-part series, made up of five half-hour two-part serials which aired weekly from 24 September to 19 November 2007. The first serial, Revenge of the Slitheen, premiered its first part on BBC One and the second part immediately after on CBBC. For the remainder of the series, each episode first aired on CBBC and was followed by a BBC One repeat broadcast one week later. The second series, which began a trend of each series consisting of 12 episodes split across six two-part serials, had an identical release schedule with transmission occurring between 29 September and 8 December 2008. An additional special mini-episode, "From Raxacoricofallapatorius with Love", was produced in support of Comic Relief, an annual telethon used to raise funds for charity, on 13 March 2009.

For the third series, all first-run episodes were simulcast on BBC One and BBC HD twice-weekly prior to the CBBC broadcast. It began on 15 October and concluded on 20 November 2009. Original episodes then returned to CBBC for the fourth series, with repeated episodes on BBC Two, BBC HD, BBC One, and BBC One HD. It premiered on 11 October with the finale airing on 16 November 2010. Fifth and sixth series of the programme had been commissioned; however, Sladen died after only six of the intended twelve episodes for the fifth series had been recorded. Davies made the decision to continue post-production work on the completed stories, but to cancel filming on the remaining serials. The completed episodes were broadcast posthumously from 3–18 October, first airing on CBBC again followed by simulcasted BBC One/BBC One HD transmissions one week later. Three scripts had already been drafted for the other six episodes: Meet Mr Smith by Gareth Roberts and Clayton Hickman, The Thirteenth Floor by Ford, and The Battle of Bannerman Road by Davies. Davies and Ford co-created Wizards vs Aliens as a spiritual successor to the programme, in which The Thirteenth Floor was adapted as a serial. Some reruns of The Sarah Jane Adventures also aired on BBC Three or in an omnibus format. The show itself had one spin-off series, Sarah Jane's Alien Files, that aired in 2010 and a one-off reunion special, "Farewell, Sarah Jane", to honour Sladen in 2020.

== Series overview ==
Series	Episodes	Originally released (UK)		Average viewers (millions)
Series	Episodes	First released	Last released	Average viewers (millions)
New Year's special		1 January 2007		2.90
1	10	24 September 2007	19 November 2007	1.16
2	12	29 September 2008	8 December 2008	0.79
Comic Relief special		13 March 2009		8.30
3	12	15 October 2009	20 November 2009	1.01
4	12	11 October 2010	16 November 2010	0.80
5	6	3 October 2011	18 October 2011	0.65
Reunion special		9 April 2020		—N/a

== Episodes ==
=== New Year's special (2007) ===
Sarah Jane Adventures New Year's Special
No. story	No. in series	Title	Directed by	Written by	Original release date	Prod. code	UK viewers (millions)	AI
1	–	"Invasion of the Bane"	Colin Teague	Russell T Davies & Gareth Roberts	1 January 2007	1.X	2.90	77

=== Series 1 (2007) ===
List of The Sarah Jane Adventures series 1 episodes
No. story	No. in series	Title	Directed by	Written by	Original release date	Prod. code	UK viewers (millions) (Note: For consistency, the following figures are those the episode received in its first broadcast on BBC One, which may not have been transmitted on the date listed. The CBBC figures, when known, are included as a footnote.)	AI
2	1–2	Revenge of the Slitheen	Alice Troughton	Gareth Roberts	24 September 2007	1.1	1.40	79
2	1–2	Revenge of the Slitheen	Alice Troughton	Gareth Roberts	24 September 2007	1.2	1.10 (Note: This episode received 450,000 viewers in its CBBC broadcast.)	77
3	3–4	Eye of the Gorgon	Alice Troughton	Phil Ford	1 October 2007	1.3	1.10 (Note: This episode received 360,000 viewers in its CBBC broadcast.)	83
3	3–4	Eye of the Gorgon	Alice Troughton	Phil Ford	8 October 2007	1.4	1.00 (Note: This episode received 410,000 viewers in its CBBC broadcast.)	85
4	5–6	Warriors of Kudlak	Charles Martin	Phil Gladwin	15 October 2007	1.5	1.00 (Note: This episode received 420,000 viewers in its CBBC broadcast.)	85
4	5–6	Warriors of Kudlak	Charles Martin	Phil Gladwin	22 October 2007	1.6	1.20 (Note: This episode received 400,000 viewers in its CBBC broadcast.)	85
5	7–8	Whatever Happened to Sarah Jane?	Graeme Harper	Gareth Roberts	29 October 2007	1.7	1.20	85
5	7–8	Whatever Happened to Sarah Jane?	Graeme Harper	Gareth Roberts	5 November 2007	1.8	1.10 (Note: This episode received 630,000 viewers in its CBBC broadcast.)	85
6	9–10	The Lost Boy	Charles Martin	Phil Ford	12 November 2007	1.9	1.30 (Note: This episode received 460,000 viewers in its CBBC broadcast.)	84
6	9–10	The Lost Boy	Charles Martin	Phil Ford	19 November 2007	1.10	1.20 (Note: This episode received 660,000 viewers in its CBBC broadcast.)	N/A

=== Series 2 (2008) ===
List of The Sarah Jane Adventures series 2 episodes
No. story	No. in series	Title	Directed by	Written by	Original release date	Prod. code	UK viewers (millions)	AI
7	1–2	The Last Sontaran	Joss Agnew	Phil Ford	29 September 2008	2.1	0.82	85
7	1–2	The Last Sontaran	Joss Agnew	Phil Ford	29 September 2008	2.2	0.73 (Note: This episode received 480,000 viewers in its CBBC broadcast.)	86
8	3–4	The Day of the Clown	Michael Kerrigan	Phil Ford	6 October 2008	2.3	0.60 (Note: This episode received 510,000 viewers in its CBBC broadcast.)	82
8	3–4	The Day of the Clown	Michael Kerrigan	Phil Ford	13 October 2008	2.4	0.76 (Note: This episode received 440,000 viewers in its CBBC broadcast.)	81
9	5–6	Secrets of the Stars	Michael Kerrigan	Gareth Roberts	20 October 2008	2.5	0.86 (Note: This episode received 520,000 viewers in its CBBC broadcast.)	83
9	5–6	Secrets of the Stars	Michael Kerrigan	Gareth Roberts	27 October 2008	2.6	0.70	86
10	7–8	The Mark of the Berserker	Joss Agnew	Joseph Lidster	3 November 2008	2.7	0.87 (Note: This episode received 530,000 viewers in its CBBC broadcast.)	75
10	7–8	The Mark of the Berserker	Joss Agnew	Joseph Lidster	10 November 2008	2.8	0.87 (Note: This episode received 630,000 viewers in its CBBC broadcast.)	84
11	9–10	The Temptation of Sarah Jane Smith	Graeme Harper	Gareth Roberts	17 November 2008	2.9	0.72	82
11	9–10	The Temptation of Sarah Jane Smith	Graeme Harper	Gareth Roberts	24 November 2008	2.10	0.80 (Note: This episode received 590,000 viewers in its CBBC broadcast.)	85
12	11–12	Enemy of the Bane	Graeme Harper	Phil Ford	1 December 2008	2.11	0.94	79
12	11–12	Enemy of the Bane	Graeme Harper	Phil Ford	8 December 2008	2.12	0.82 (Note: This episode received 560,000 viewers in its CBBC broadcast.)	85

=== Comic Relief special (2009) ===
List of The Sarah Jane Adventures series 2 episodes
No. story	No. in series	Title	Directed by	Written by	Original release date	Prod. code	UK viewers (millions)
–	–	"From Raxacoricofallapatorius with Love"	Joss Agnew	Gareth Roberts & Clayton Hickman	13 March 2009	–	8.30

=== Series 3 (2009) ===
List of The Sarah Jane Adventures series 3 episodes
No. story	No. in series	Title	Directed by	Written by	Original release date	Prod. code	UK viewers (millions) (Note: The following numbers are combined figures for the episode's broadcast on BBC One and BBC HD.)	AI
13	1–2	Prisoner of the Judoon	Joss Agnew	Phil Ford	15 October 2009	3.1	0.73	81
13	1–2	Prisoner of the Judoon	Joss Agnew	Phil Ford	16 October 2009	3.2	0.82	86
14	3–4	The Mad Woman in the Attic	Alice Troughton	Joseph Lidster	22 October 2009	3.3	0.75	86
14	3–4	The Mad Woman in the Attic	Alice Troughton	Joseph Lidster	23 October 2009	3.4	0.84	86
15	5–6	The Wedding of Sarah Jane Smith	Joss Agnew	Gareth Roberts	29 October 2009	3.5	1.59	87
15	5–6	The Wedding of Sarah Jane Smith	Joss Agnew	Gareth Roberts	30 October 2009	3.6	1.47	89
16	7–8	The Eternity Trap	Alice Troughton	Phil Ford	5 November 2009	3.7	1.14	86
16	7–8	The Eternity Trap	Alice Troughton	Phil Ford	6 November 2009	3.8	0.93	86
17	9–10	Mona Lisa's Revenge	Joss Agnew	Phil Ford	12 November 2009	3.9	1.10	84
17	9–10	Mona Lisa's Revenge	Joss Agnew	Phil Ford	13 November 2009	3.10	0.92	86
18	11–12	The Gift	Alice Troughton	Rupert Laight	19 November 2009	3.11	0.95	84
18	11–12	The Gift	Alice Troughton	Rupert Laight	20 November 2009	3.12	0.89	87

=== Series 4 (2010) ===
List of The Sarah Jane Adventures series 4 episodes
No. story	No. in series	Title	Directed by	Written by	Original release date	Prod. code	UK viewers (millions)
19	1–2	The Nightmare Man	Joss Agnew	Joseph Lidster	11 October 2010	4.1	0.59
19	1–2	The Nightmare Man	Joss Agnew	Joseph Lidster	12 October 2010	4.2	0.67
20	3–4	The Vault of Secrets	Joss Agnew	Phil Ford	18 October 2010	4.3	0.73
20	3–4	The Vault of Secrets	Joss Agnew	Phil Ford	19 October 2010	4.4	0.61
21	5–6	Death of the Doctor	Ashley Way	Russell T Davies	25 October 2010	4.5	0.92
21	5–6	Death of the Doctor	Ashley Way	Russell T Davies	26 October 2010	4.6	0.96
22	7–8	The Empty Planet	Ashley Way	Gareth Roberts	1 November 2010	4.7	0.99
22	7–8	The Empty Planet	Ashley Way	Gareth Roberts	2 November 2010	4.8	0.82
23	9–10	Lost in Time	Joss Agnew	Rupert Laight	8 November 2010	4.9	0.99
23	9–10	Lost in Time	Joss Agnew	Rupert Laight	9 November 2010	4.10	0.68
24	11–12	Goodbye, Sarah Jane Smith	Joss Agnew	Clayton Hickman and Gareth Roberts	15 November 2010	4.11	0.81
24	11–12	Goodbye, Sarah Jane Smith	Joss Agnew	Clayton Hickman and Gareth Roberts	16 November 2010	4.12	0.82

=== Series 5 (2011) ===
List of The Sarah Jane Adventures series 5 episodes
No. story	No. in series	Title	Directed by	Written by	Original release date	Prod. code	UK viewers (millions)
25	1–2	Sky	Ashley Way	Phil Ford	3 October 2011	5.1	0.53
25	1–2	Sky	Ashley Way	Phil Ford	4 October 2011	5.2	0.53
26	3–4	The Curse of Clyde Langer	Ashley Way	Phil Ford	10 October 2011	5.3	0.79
26	3–4	The Curse of Clyde Langer	Ashley Way	Phil Ford	11 October 2011	5.4	0.73
27	5–6	The Man Who Never Was	Joss Agnew	Gareth Roberts	17 October 2011	5.5	0.71
27	5–6	The Man Who Never Was	Joss Agnew	Gareth Roberts	18 October 2011	5.6	0.60

=== Reunion special (2020) ===
A one-off reunion special written by Davies was produced as a webisode. It featured cast members of The Sarah Jane Adventures attending a memorial service for Sarah Jane and was released on Doctor Who social media platforms on 19 April 2020.

The Sarah Jane Adventures reunion special
Title	Written by	Original release date
"Farewell, Sarah Jane"	Russell T Davies	9 April 2020

== Sarah Jane's Alien Files (2010) ==
A spin-off compilation series titled Sarah Jane's Alien Files aired on CBBC in 2010 to accompany the fourth series. The programme included the main characters of the parent series inputting data about recently-confronted aliens into Mr Smith. New footage was mixed with existing material from The Sarah Jane Adventures and Doctor Who.

Sarah Jane's Alien Files episodes
No.	Featured Aliens	Featured Character	Directed by	Written by	Original release date	UK viewers (millions)
1	The Trickster and Graske	Sarah Jane Smith	Pip Banyard	John Piper	11 October 2010	0.43
2	Entity, Eve, and Ship	Rani Chandra	Pip Banyard	John Piper	18 October 2010	0.43
3	Mrs Wormwood, Bane Mother, and Sontarans	Luke Smith	Pip Banyard	John Piper	25 October 2010	0.39
4	Slitheen, Blathereen, and Rakweed	Sarah Jane Smith	Pip Banyard	John Piper	1 November 2010	0.49
5	Bersekers and Mona Lisa	Clyde Langer	Pip Banyard	John Piper	8 November 2010	0.48
6	Judoon, Androvax, and Mister Dread	Luke Smith	Pip Banyard	John Piper	15 November 2010	0.43

== Ratings ==
The Sarah Jane Adventures : UK viewers per episode (millions)

Season	Episode number												Average
Season	1	2	3	4	5	6	7	8	9	10	11	12	Average
1	2.90	1.40	1.10	1.10	1.00	1.00	1.20	1.20	1.10	1.30	1.20	–	1.32
2	0.82	0.73	0.60	0.76	0.86	0.70	0.87	0.87	0.72	0.80	0.94	0.82	0.79
3	0.73	0.82	0.75	0.84	1.59	1.47	1.14	0.93	1.10	0.92	0.95	0.89	1.01
4	0.59	0.67	0.73	0.61	0.92	0.96	0.99	0.82	0.99	0.68	0.81	0.82	0.80
5	0.53	0.53	0.79	0.73	0.71	0.60	–						0.65

Audience measurement performed by Broadcasters' Audience Research Board (Note: For series 1, the first figure listed in this row is for the New Year's Day special. Add one to the episode count of each series one episode to associate the correct figure to its respective story. The viewers for "Invasion of the Bane" are included in the average for the series.)

== See also ==
- List of Doctor Who episodes (1963–1989)
- List of Doctor Who episodes (2005–present)
- K-9 and Company
- List of K-9 episodes
