= Tommy Knight =

British actor

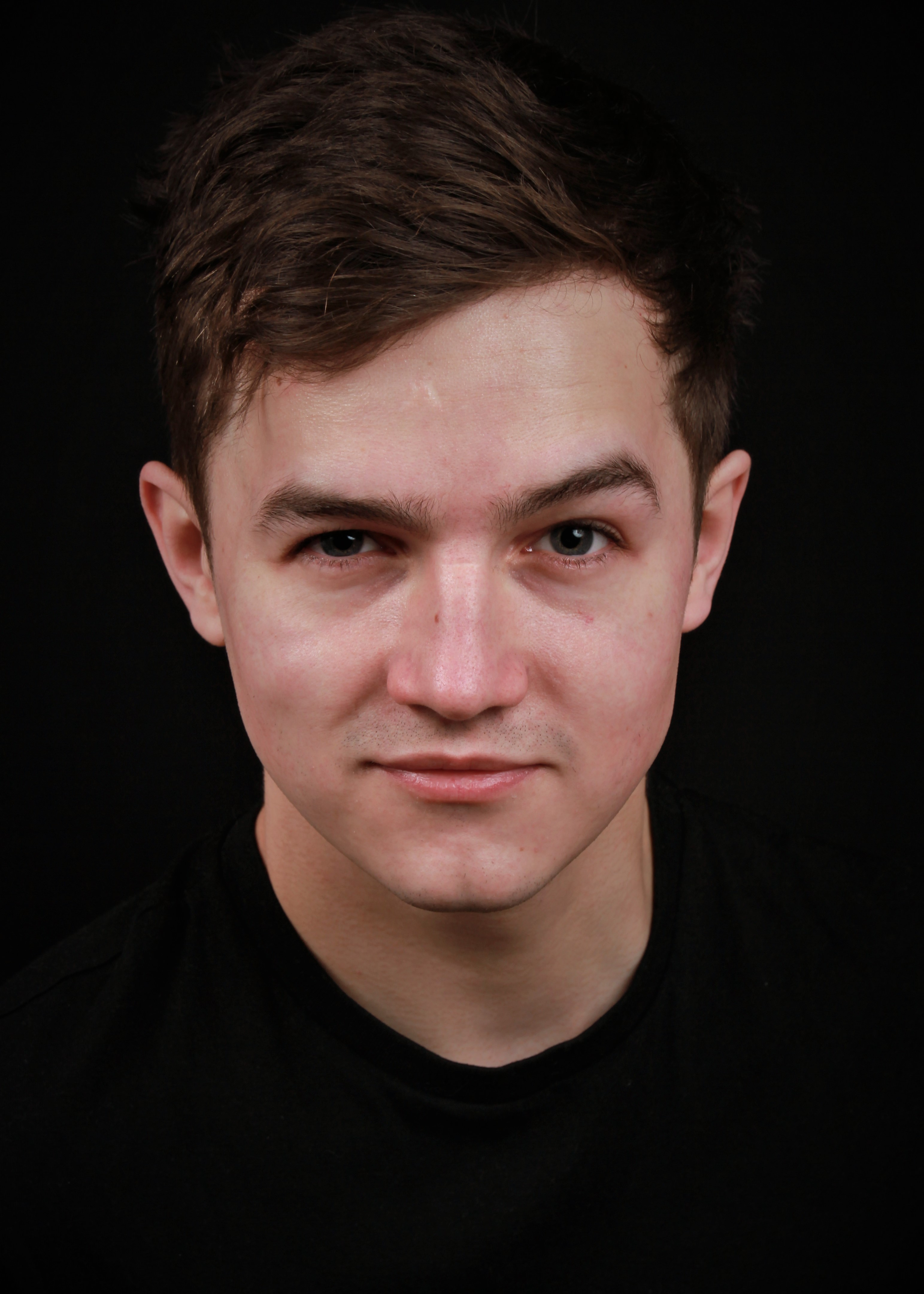
- Knight in 2018
- Born: Thomas Lawrence Knight; 22 January 1993 (age 33); Chatham, Kent, England
- Occupation: Actor
- Years active: 2001–2023
- Television: The Sarah Jane Adventures (2007–2011); Waterloo Road (2012–2015); Glue (2014); Victoria (2016–2019)
- Website: www.tommyk.uk

Thomas Lawrence Knight (born 22 January 1993) is an English former actor best known for playing Luke Smith in The Sarah Jane Adventures and Doctor Who, Kevin Chalk in the original run of Waterloo Road, Cal Bray in Glue and Archibald Brodie in Victoria.

== Early and personal life ==
Born in Chatham, Kent, Knight is the middle of five siblings, all of whom act. He attended Delce Junior School in Rochester from year 4 onwards and formerly attended the Sir Joseph Williamson's Mathematical School.

Knight was in a relationship with Waterloo Road co-star Abby Mavers from 2012 to 2017.

== Career ==
Knight started in West End Theatre with Deborah Warner's production of Euripides' Medea, (Queens Theatre, 2001), and has since appeared in Chitty Chitty Bang Bang, (London Palladium, 2002), The Snowman, (Peacock Theatre, 2003), The Full Monty, (UK National Tour, 2004) and the Royal Shakespeare Company's Macbeth (Albery Theatre, 2005).

Additional television performances include roles in TV to Go, (BBC, 2002), Casualty, (BBC, 2005, 2007 and 2015), The Impressionists, (BBC, 2006), Sorted, (BBC, 2006), Doctors (BBC, 2006), and The Bill (Talkback Thames, 2006 and 2009), and Myths (BBC, 2008).

Knight is best known for playing Luke Smith, adoptive son of Sarah Jane Smith, in the first three series of The Sarah Jane Adventures (2007, 2008, 2009) and in the 2008 Doctor Who episodes "The Stolen Earth" and "Journey's End". He was featured in the second part of "The End of Time", the two-part 2009 Doctor Who Christmas specials. He was written out as a regular on The Sarah Jane Adventures in the first serial of the fourth series in 2010, when Luke drives off to Oxford University, however he continued to make semi-regular appearances in the show up to the end of the fifth and final series, usually via webcam from his dorm room. His final appearance was in the show's final episode, "The Man Who Never Was".

He also featured in a CEOP e-Safety Video "Tom's Story", which can be watched on YouTube. Knight featured in a darker role in a 2012 independent UK horror film, A Suburban Fairytale, in which he acted alongside real life sister Yohanna Farrel in an incestuous and murderous role. He joined Waterloo Road in 2012, first appearing in episode 8 of series 8 playing Kevin Skelton. His notable storylines included being adopted by teacher Daniel Chalk (and thus changing his name to Kevin Chalk), his relationship with Dynasty Barry, having an affair with a teaching assistant and most recently suffering a stroke before a university interview. He left Waterloo Road in Series 10 Episode 12.

In 2014, he appeared as murder victim Cal in the E4 drama series Glue. He later played Hall Boy Brodie in Victoria, a period drama starring Waterloo Road and Doctor Who alumnus Jenna Coleman.

In March 2023, in an interview with Knight in Doctor Who Magazine, Knight says he no longer acts and is now a computer coder, offering tech support as well.

== Conventions ==
In August 2024, Knight was among the guest line-up at Whooverville 15, held in Derby. While there, he was also interviewed by Martin Spellacey for Bristol-based community radio show ShoutOut.

== List of credits ==
=== Television ===
| Year | Title | Role | Notes | Ref |
|---|---|---|---|---|
| 2002 | TV to Go | Timothy | | |
| 2002 | 15 Storeys High | Various | | |
| 2005 | Casualty | Liam Woodbridge | | |
| 2005 | The Impressionists | Paul Cézanne Junior | | |
| 2006 | Doctors | Kevin Dobson | | |
| 2006 | Sorted | Robert | | |
| 2006 | The Bill | Shaun Perkins | | |
| 2007–2011 | The Sarah Jane Adventures | Luke Smith | Main role; 43 episodes | |
| 2007 | Chute | Luke Smith | | |
| 2007 | Blue Peter | Himself | | |
| 2007, 2010 | TMi | Himself | | |
| 2007 | Casualty | Jugg | | |
| 2008, 2010 | Doctor Who | Luke Smith | 3 episodes | |
| 2010 | Sarah Jane's Alien Files | Luke Smith | Main role; 2 episodes | |
| 2010 | The Bill | Greg Holbrook | | |
| 2011 | My Sarah Jane: A Tribute to Elisabeth Sladen | Himself | | |
| 2012–2015 | Waterloo Road | Kevin Skelton/Chalk | 52 episodes | |
| 2013 | Let's Dance for Comic Relief | Himself | | |
| 2013 | 12 Again | Himself | Doctor Who special | |
| 2014 | Glue | Cal Bray | | |
| 2015 | Casualty | Rhys Healy | | |
| 2015 | You, Me and the Apocalypse | Dealer Dan | | |
| 2016–2019 | Victoria | Brodie | Main role; 25 episodes | |
| 2016 | Doctors | Nathan Williams | | |
| 2020 | Ghost Seekers | Naked Ghost | 1 episode | |

=== Film ===
| Year | Title | Role | Notes |
|---|---|---|---|
| 2004 | There's No Santa Dumbass | Thomas | |
| 2004 | Beneath the Steel Sky | Peter | Student film |
| 2004 | The Real Guthrie | Young Guthrie | |
| 2005 | Dialogue for One | Boy | Short film |
| 2007 | Runaways | Charlie | Short film |
| 2007 | Pudding Bowl | Jack | Short film |
| 2009 | The Silver Key | Dark haired boy | Short film |
| 2011 | Why | Grandson | Short film |
| 2011 | Il Maestro | Pianist | Short film |
| 2012 | Stitches | Tom | |
| 2015 | Closets | Henry | Short film |
| 2015 | The Enchanted Rose | Alex | Short film |
| 2017 | The Hippopotamus | David | |
| 2021 | A Suburban Fairytale | Paul | |
| 2023 | Last Village on the Right | Liam | Upcoming |

=== Audio ===
| Year | Title | Role | Notes |
|---|---|---|---|
| 2010 | Doctor Who: Podshock | Himself | Episode 226 Extra Edition |
| 2023 | Rani Takes on the World | Luke Smith | The Revenge of Wormwood, 2 episodes |

=== Online ===
| Year | Title | Role | Notes |
|---|---|---|---|
| 2006 | Think You Know? | Tom | |
| 2014 | Glue Online | Cal Bray | |
| 2020 | "Farewell, Sarah Jane" | Luke Smith | |

=== Theatre ===
| Year | Title | Role | Notes |
|---|---|---|---|
| 2000 | Whistle Down The Wind (show cancelled.) | Poor Baby | Aldwych Theatre, London |
| 2001 | Medea | Medea's son | Queen's Theatre, West End |
| 2002–2003 | Chitty Chitty Bang Bang | Rolf | London Palladium, West End |
| 2003 | Sister Mary Ignatius Explains it All to You | Thomas | Barons Court Theatre, London |
| 2003–2004 | The Snowman | The boy | Peacock Theatre, West End |
| 2004 | The Full Monty | Nathan | UK national tour |
| 2005 | Macbeth | Young MacDuff | Albery Theatre, West End |
| 2014–2015 | Hope | Jake | Royal Court Theatre, West End |
| 2019 | The Market Boy | The Boy | The Union Theatre, London |
