= Death of the Doctor =

2010 Sarah Jane Adventures story

21 – Death of the Doctor
- The Sarah Jane Adventures story

Cast
- Starring: Elisabeth Sladen – Sarah Jane Smith; Tommy Knight – Luke Smith; Daniel Anthony – Clyde Langer; Anjli Mohindra – Rani Chandra; Alexander Armstrong – Mr Smith
- Others: Matt Smith – The Doctor; Katy Manning – Jo Jones; Finn Jones – Santiago Jones; Laila Rouass – Colonel Karim; Ace Bhatti – Haresh Chandra; Jimmy Vee – Groske; Paul Kasey, Ruari Mears, and Ben Ashley – Shansheeth; David Bradley – Voice of Shansheeth Blue; Phillip Hurd-Wood – Voice of The Groske; Jon Glover – Additional Shansheeth Voices

Production
- Directed by: Ashley Way
- Written by: Russell T Davies
- Script editor: Gary Russell
- Produced by: Brian Minchin; Phil Ford (co-producer)
- Executive producers: Russell T Davies; Nikki Wilson
- Music by: Sam Watts; Dan Watts
- Production code: 4.5 and 4.6
- Series: Series 4
- Running time: 2 episodes, 25 minutes each
- First broadcast: 25 October 2010
- Last broadcast: 26 October 2010

Chronology
← Preceded by The Vault of Secrets	Followed by → The Empty Planet

Death of the Doctor is a two-part story of The Sarah Jane Adventures which was broadcast on CBBC on 25 and 26 October 2010. It is the third story of the fourth series. A cross-over story with Doctor Who, the story features actress Katy Manning reprising her role as Jo Grant for the first time since the 1973 Doctor Who serial The Green Death and a guest appearance by Matt Smith—Doctor Who's lead actor from 2010 to 2013—as the Eleventh Doctor. In the episode, Tia Karim, a rogue member of UNIT allies with members of the Shansheeth alien race to lure Sarah Jane and Jo into a trap so they can access the Doctor's time machine, the TARDIS, and change history and Karim can leave Earth, with the cover story of the Doctor's funeral. Exposition at the end of the episode provides updates on the lives of numerous companions from the "classic era" who had gone unaddressed in the revived era. This story was the last to feature Sarah Jane and the Doctor together on-screen.

== Plot ==
Members of the Shansheeth, a race of alien vultures, lure the Eleventh Doctor to the Wasteland of the Crimson Heart, and strand him there. The Shansheeth steal the TARDIS, with the Doctor's sonic screwdriver still inside. With the help of UNIT colonel Tia Karim they fake the Doctor's death to lure his friends to his funeral, held by the Shansheeth in a UNIT base under Snowdon. Karim notifies Sarah Jane, Clyde, and Rani of the Doctor's supposed death and invites them. Jo Grant, who stopped travelling with the Doctor to get married, (Note: As depicted in the 1973 Doctor Who serial The Green Death.) and is now Jo Jones, is also attending.

The Shansheeth's plan is to recreate the TARDIS key from Sarah Jane's and Jo's memories, which would kill them, so that the Shansheeth can use the time machine to stop death across the universe by interfering with timelines. Karim collaborates with them as there is nothing left for her on Earth.

The Doctor travels 10,000 light-years to repeatedly swap places with Clyde, who still has residual artron energy from when he touched the TARDIS. (Note: As depicted in the 2009 serial The Wedding of Sarah Jane Smith.) On one swap over, the Doctor brings Sarah Jane and Jo with him to the wasteland. With the help of Sarah Jane's sonic lipstick and buchu oil Jo has collected from her travels around the Earth, the Doctor is able to repair the device that he has been using to perform these exchanges, allowing them to return to Earth without displacing Clyde's body.

Karim and the Shansheeth forcibly secure Sarah Jane and Jo in the funeral room, where the Shansheeth have kept the TARDIS. As the Shansheeth start to pull the memories of the TARDIS key from Sarah Jane and Jo, the Doctor shouts through the door for Sarah Jane and Jo to recall all their memories of their time with him, and encourages the children to do the same. The machine is overwhelmed and begins to self-destruct. Sarah Jane and Jo safely shield themselves with the lead-lined coffin that they were fooled into believing was where the Doctor's body was. Karim and the Shansheeth are killed in the explosion. After the Doctor uses the TARDIS to return the group to Sarah Jane's home, Sarah Jane tells Clyde and Rani about the Doctor's other companions, whom she has researched.

== Continuity ==
- When Clyde asks the Doctor how many times he can change, he states that he can change 507 times, contrary to the original twelve. Davies subsequently explained that this was a joke, both on the Doctor's part and on his.
- Conversation between Sarah Jane, Jo, and the Doctor gives the current whereabouts of several past companions:
  - Liz Shaw is working on the UNIT moonbase.
  - Brigadier Lethbridge-Stewart is "stranded in Peru".
  - Barbara Wright and Ian Chesterton are married and professors at Cambridge University, rumoured to have not aged since the 1960s. This rumour was later proved untrue by the parent series, when an elderly Ian appeared in the 2022 Doctor Who episode The Power of the Doctor.
  - Ben Jackson and Polly are also married and run an orphanage in India.
  - Harry Sullivan had worked on vaccines that saved thousands of lives. The characters mention him in the past tense, possibly a reference to the death of Ian Marter, the actor that portrayed Sullivan.
  - Tegan Jovanka has become an advocate for Aboriginal rights.
  - A companion named Dorothy has raised billions of pounds through her non-profit organization "A Charitable Earth". The initials of the organization suggest the companion is probably Ace, whose first name was revealed to be Dorothy in the serial Dragonfire.
- The episode's novelization expands on this list, giving the current whereabouts of several more companions:
  - Melanie Bush works at A Charitable Earth alongside Dorothy, providing PCs to schools in Africa.
  - A "Doctor Holloway" works in San Francisco, where she is looking into new breakthroughs in surgery. Given the Holloway surname and the San Francisco setting, it is very likely that this companion is meant to be Grace Holloway.
- When Rani reminds Sarah Jane of their past encounter with the Mona Lisa, the Doctor responds with, "what do you mean the Mona Lisa?". The Doctor had previously dealt with the Mona Lisa himself in the Doctor Who serial City of Death.

== Music ==
In some of Sam Watts' music, vocals were provided by Jodie Kearns, wife of Doctor Who and Torchwood writer James Moran.

== Ratings ==
Part 1 achieved combined final ratings of 1.40 (0.92/0.48) and Part 2 achieved combined final ratings of 1.43 (0.96/0.47).

== Home media ==
Released as part of The Complete Fourth Series, (Season in America) on DVD, Blu-ray is a UK exclusive. This story was released on the Special Edition DVD of Doctor Who story The Green Death, including an audio commentary by Russell T Davies and Katy Manning, and re-released on The Complete Matt Smith Years on Blu-ray on its bonus disc. It was released again as a part of The Collection: Season 10 Blu-ray set on its bonus disc.

== Novelisation ==
Death of the Doctor
- Author: Gary Russell
- Series: The Sarah Jane Adventures #11
- Published: 25 November 2010; BBC Children's Books
- Pages: 128
- ISBN: 978-1-405-90806-1
- Preceded by: The Nightmare Man

This was the eleventh and final Sarah Jane Adventures serial to be adapted as a novel. Written by Gary Russell, the book has only been published as an E-book on 25 November 2010.
