= Gender in Doctor Who =

Doctor Who, a British science fiction television series broadcast by the BBC since 1963, has featured several male and female characters in lead roles. The roles that these characters play can be viewed as stereotypical of their gender. The portrayal of gender can be most noticeable in the Doctor's companions, the people he travels with.

== Female roles ==
The majority of the Companions featured on the show are women. Many female characters during the First and Second Doctors' series (1963–1969) were teenage girls from the ages of 14–15, including Vicki, Katarina, and Victoria. Several female characters, including Polly, Jo Grant, and Donna Noble, have had assistant and secretary jobs during the show. Female scientist companions also outnumber male scientist companions, with Zoe Heriot, Liz Shaw and River Song represent several branches of science.

Liz Shaw, played by Caroline John, first appeared in Spearhead from Space (1970) as the new scientific advisor to UNIT. John said, "I was excited at first to be a brainy girl, but all the directors wanted really was a sexy piece. It was such an effort looking glamorous on cold clay-pits and rubbish dumps. I enjoyed the series but found it restricting after a while."

Elisabeth Sladen starred as Sarah Jane Smith, a journalist who first appeared in The Time Warrior (1973–1974). Sladen returned to Doctor Who in "School Reunion" (2006) and in the spinoff The Sarah Jane Adventures (2007–2011). Actor and "School Reunion" writer Toby Whithouse said, "[Sarah] changed the companion from being a rather helpless hysteric to being a feisty, opinionated, strong equal to the Doctor. And, at the time, you know that was quite an extraordinary thing to do. That was not the role the companion, or women, were meant to be playing. They were meant to be playing the victim, they were meant to be decoration. I think what Lis Sladen did with that character is quite extraordinary. We forget how revolutionary she was at the time."

Leela, played by Louise Jameson, is a warrior of the savage Sevateem tribe. She is portrayed as an intelligent noble savage. In The Invasion of Time (1978), Leela stays behind on Gallifrey after falling in love with Andred. Doctor Who producer Philip Hinchcliffe and script editor Robert Holmes said the character was inspired by George Bernard Shaw's Eliza Doolittle (from Pygmalion) and written to be a primitive that learns from the Fourth Doctor.

Romana is a Time Lord played Mary Tamm from 1978 to 1979 and Lalla Ward from 1979 to 1981. The White Guardian assigns Romana as an assistant to the Fourth Doctor. Romana initially looks down on the Doctor, but grows to view him as a teacher due to his experience. She decides not to return to Gallifrey and remains in E-Space. The character of Romana was intended to contrast the "savage" nature of Leela and is often viewed as an equal of the Doctor.

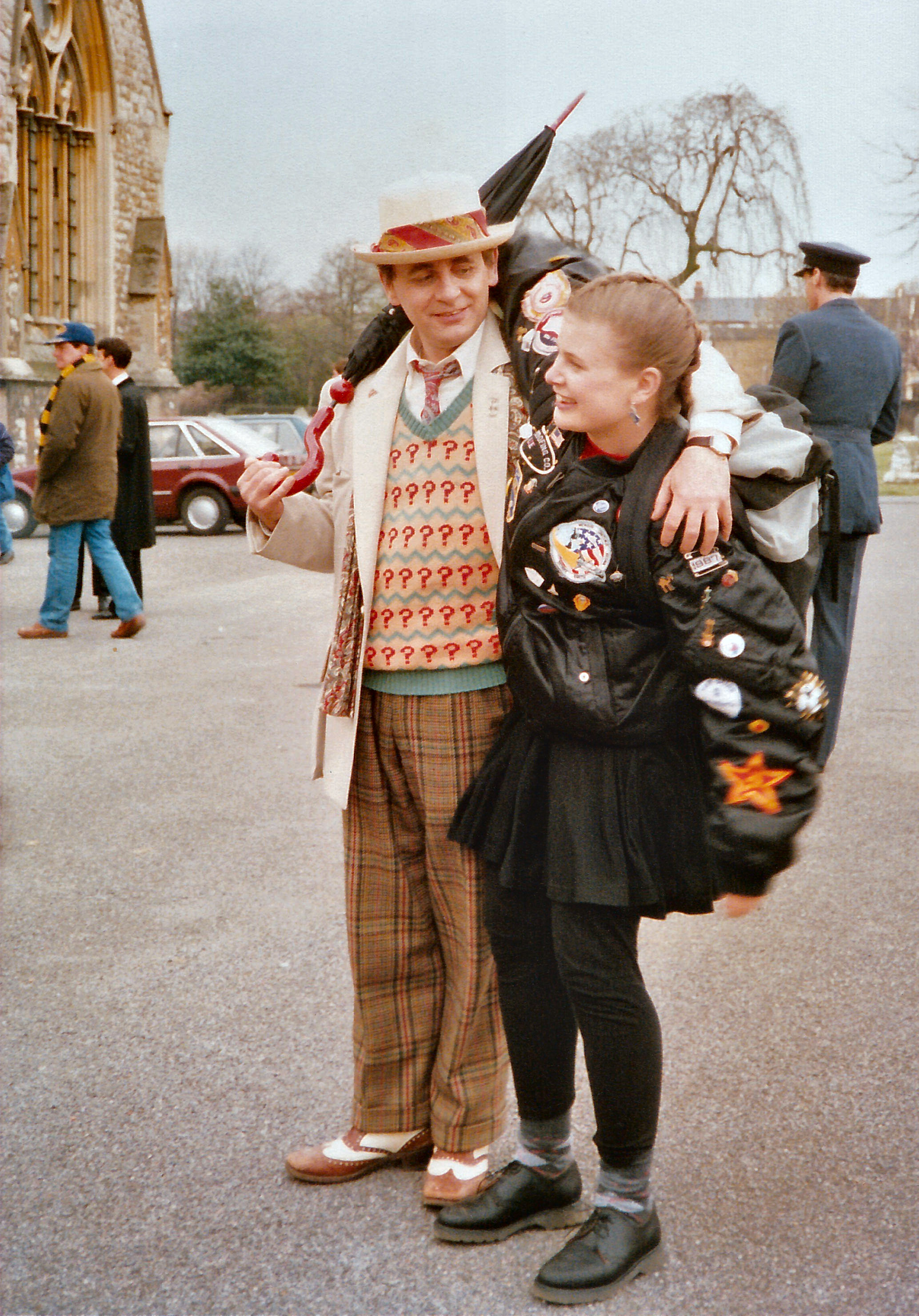
Sylvester McCoy and Sophie Aldred as the Seventh Doctor and Ace.

Nicola Bryant starred as Peri Brown beginning in Planet of Fire (1984). Producer John Nathan-Turner said of Peri, "She'll often be wearing leotards and bikinis. A lot of Dads watch Doctor Who and I'm sure they will like Nicola."

Ace, played by Sophie Aldred, is a London teenager that the Seventh Doctor meets in Dragonfire (1987). Ace and the Doctor form a student and teacher bond over the course of the series. Script editor Andrew Cartmel said that the character was written to be a "fighter and not a screamer." The character of Ace has been cited as the first "modern" companion for the Doctor. One of the reasons is that her character was written to be more realistic, three-dimensional and to grow as a person throughout her run on the show.

Billie Piper portrayed Rose Tyler in the revival of Doctor Who from 2005–2010. She is introduced as a working class shop girl that meets and travels with the Ninth and Tenth Doctors. Over the course of the first series (2005), she falls in love with the Ninth Doctor. Critics noted that Rose was more developed than previous companions. Peter Davison, who portrayed the Fifth Doctor, felt that allowing the Doctor and his companion to have sexual tension ultimately allowed for more rounded characterisation. He believed that Rose was the first example of the production team creating a well-written companion.

Martha Jones, played by Freema Agyeman, is a medical student who becomes the Tenth Doctor's companion in the third series (2007). Martha parts from the Doctor's company as she recognises how unhealthy their relationship has become. As a young medical professional, Martha has been the focus of studies which discuss young girls' perceptions of "gendered representations of science, technology, engineering and mathematics (STEM)". The research was further analysed "the representation of STEM-related topics" through the programmes' two prominent, respective, female characters: Lisa Simpson and Martha Jones.

Donna Noble, played by Catherine Tate, is introduced in "The Runaway Bride" (2006) as an outspoken Londoner in her mid-30s as a temp worker. Donna and the Tenth Doctor shared a strictly platonic relationship; who he refers to her as his "best friend".

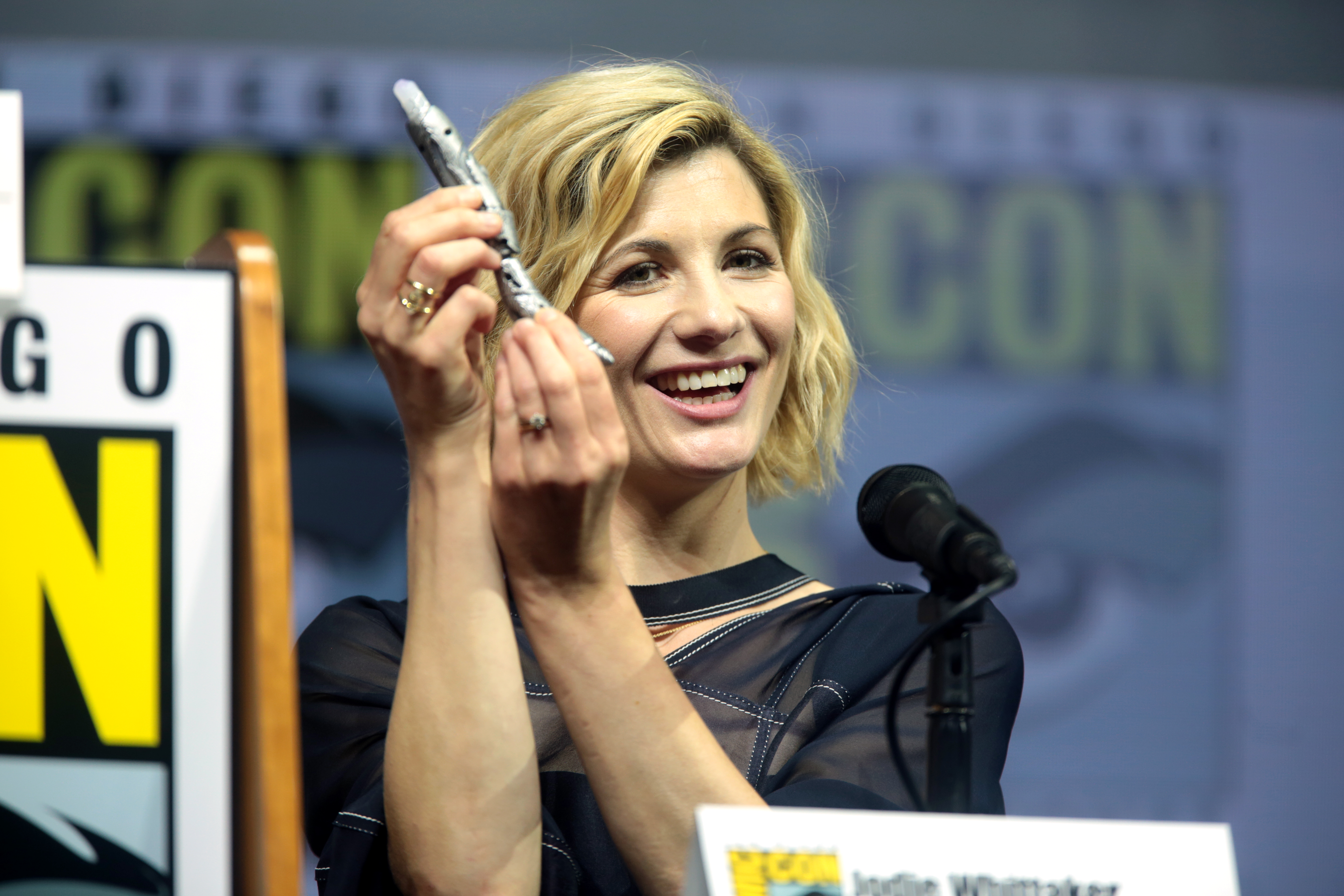
Jodie Whittaker played the Thirteenth Doctor, the first female incarnation of the Doctor.

A female Master called Missy was introduced in the eighth series episode "Deep Breath" (2014), portrayed by Michelle Gomez and formally revealed as the Master in the series' penultimate episode "Dark Water" (2014). Missy often refers to the Twelfth Doctor as her "boyfriend" or "friend". The Thirteenth Doctor is the first female incarnation of the Doctor, played by Jodie Whittaker, and introduced in a short clip televised during the 2017 Wimbledon Championships. Fan reaction to the character was largely positive, but "a sizable minority protested that the Doctor shouldn't be played by a woman." Supportive fans cite that Whittaker's Doctor would be a positive role model for young girls.

== Male roles ==
While most Doctors have been men, there have been less male companions. Many of male companions on the show have had careers in the military or appeared as soldiers, including Ben Jackson, Jamie McCrimmon, and Brigadier Lethbridge-Stewart.

Jack Harkness, played by John Barrowman, first appeared in "The Empty Child" (2005) as a former "Time Agent" from the 51st century now working as a con man. Jack's original appearances in Doctor Who were conceived with the intention of forming a character arc in which Jack is transformed from a coward to a hero.

Rory Williams, portrayed by Arthur Darvill, was introduced as the "sort of boyfriend" of companion Amy Pond in "The Eleventh Hour" (2010), and later marries Amy in "The Big Bang" (2010). Darvill stated of the couple's marriage that Amy will always "wear the trousers". However, he felt that Rory's marriage had stopped the character "feeling so unworthy." Executive producer Steven Moffat had intended to have a married couple on the TARDIS "from the off".

== Sexuality ==
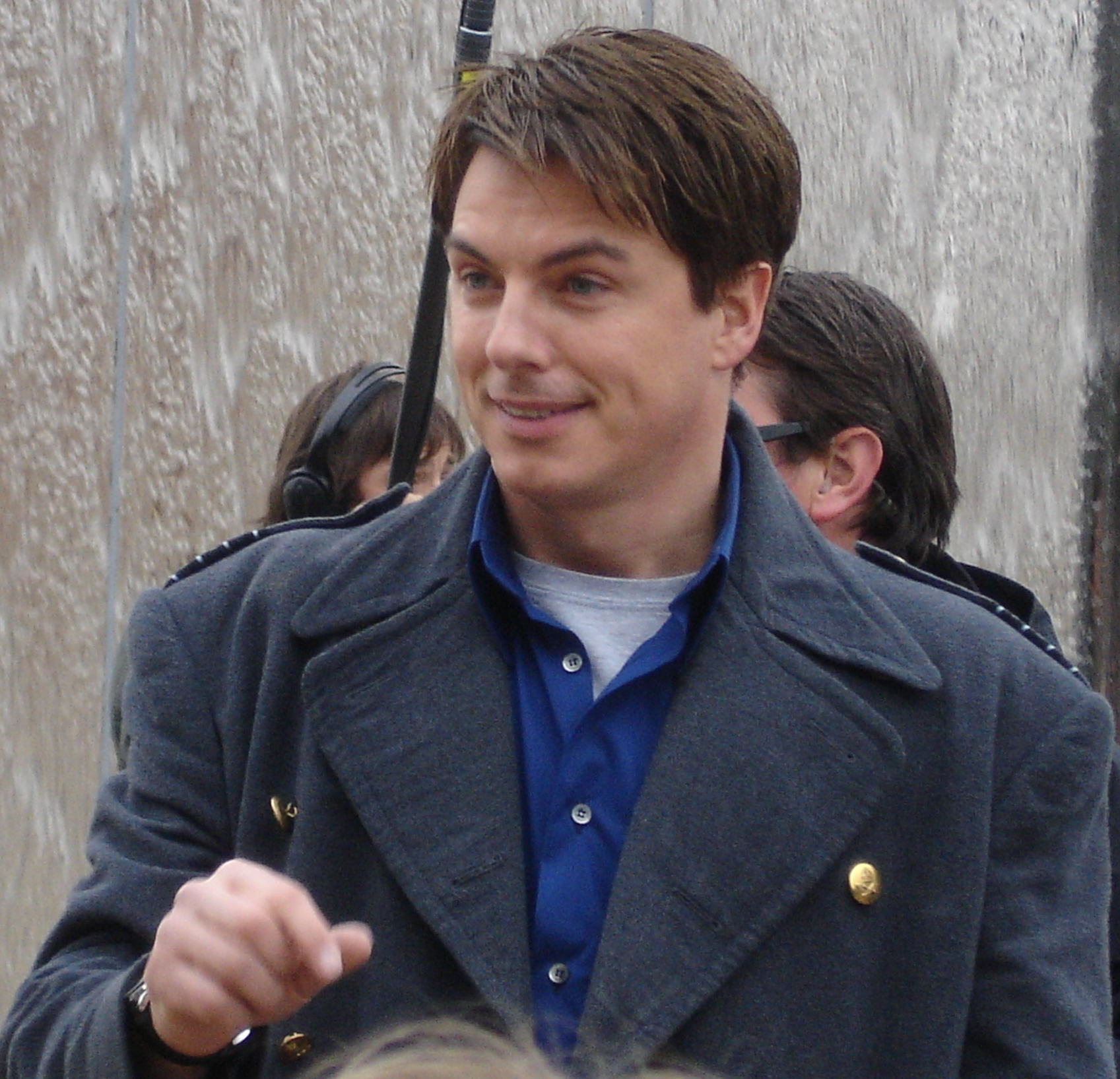
John Barrowman as Jack Harkness

Jack Harkness was the first openly non-heterosexual character in the history of televised Doctor Who. Showrunner and executive producer Russell T Davies said about the creation of Jack, "I thought: 'It's time you introduce bisexuals properly into mainstream television'".

Bill Potts, played by Pearl Mackie, is the first lesbian companion to travel with the Doctor.

Madame Vastra (a Silurian) and Jenny (a human) are a same-sex married couple introduced in the episode "A Good Man Goes to War" (2011). They appeared in five total episodes.

"Farewell, Sarah Jane", a 2020 short featured on the official Doctor Who YouTube channel, revealed that companions Tegan Jovanka and Nyssa were in a relationship and referred to as a couple.
