= Farewell, Sarah Jane =

2020 The Sarah Jane Adventures special

- The Sarah Jane Adventures special

Cast
- Starring: Katy Manning – Jo Jones; Sophie Aldred – Dorothy "Ace" McShane; Mina Anwar – Gita Chandra; Daniel Anthony – Clyde Langer; Tommy Knight – Luke Smith; Anjli Mohindra – Rani Chandra; Jacob Dudman – Narrator and Mr. Smith

Production
- Directed by: Jacob Dudman (uncredited)
- Written by: Russell T Davies
- Produced by: Emily Cook
- Music by: Sam Watts
- Running time: 13 minutes
- First broadcast: 19 April 2020

Chronology
| ← Preceded by The Man Who Never Was | Followed by → — |

"Farewell, Sarah Jane" is a YouTube special connected to The Sarah Jane Adventures which was created as part of a series of Doctor Who-related webcasts in order to honor Elisabeth Sladen following her death in 2011, which halted production of the show's final series.

== Plot ==
A funeral service is held for Sarah Jane Smith, and attended by Luke Smith (Tommy Knight), Clyde Langer (Daniel Anthony), and Rani Chandra (Anjli Mohindra), who gather together during the reception as people smile sadly. Luke greets U.N.I.T. soldiers and is hugged by Kate Lethbridge-Stewart while Clyde talks to Tegan Jovanka and Nyssa, then Ben and Polly, then Ian Chesterton and Barbara Wright, then Martha Jones and Mickey Smith with their son, August. Dodo Chaplet, Grace Holloway, Liz Shaw, and Victoria Waterfield greet the group. Sky Smith briefly manifests in her human form while Jack Harkness salutes Sarah Jane from a distance and leaves. Maria Jackson and her father participate in the reception virtually, having missed their flight due to chasing an alien in Seattle. Meanwhile, Rani stays back quietly.

Guests tell stories until the waiters reveal themselves to be Jackals of the Backwards Clock, servants of The Trickster. The Trickster appears, planning to replace Earth with a copy from the Septic Dimension, but the funeral guests shrink the Trickster to the size of a doll and lock him in a treasure chest at the bottom of the ocean for one thousand years before resuming the reception. As it is time to leave, the guests trade contact information and agree to meet up every year, calling themselves the Family Smith. Luke, Clyde, and Rani stay by the door to say goodbye to everyone. Jo Jones approaches the three apologetically, sharing her love for Sarah Jane and comforting the others in the lack of appearance from the Doctor, saying that since he has two hearts, the pain of losing Sarah Jane is likely greater for him. Jo leaves, and Gita and Haresh Chandra approach them. Gita speaks highly of Sarah Jane's relationship with Clyde, Rani, and Luke before wishing them farewell. Dorothy McShane hugs the three and shares a time the Seventh Doctor suddenly said he missed Sarah Jane and that she understands the sentiment.

Once it is just Clyde, Luke, and Rani, Clyde jokes at first, but then talks about how Sarah Jane saw potential in him and that he wishes he got to say he loved her. As the three drive to Sarah Jane's house, Luke and Clyde agree that it is as though Sarah Jane waited for all three of them to be out of the country to save them pain, but Rani remains silent. They look through the house and reach the attic, calling for Mr. Smith, who says that Sarah Jane wanted the house and Mr. Smith to be shut down, waiting for its next owner. They agree to see each other on Christmas Day, when Luke says that he was lucky to have been adopted by Sarah Jane. Luke and Clyde go home while Rani stays behind and cleans up. As Mr. Smith shuts down, Rani tells him that she does not think Sarah Jane is dead, but rather that the Doctor came back for her and brought her on one last trip. Mr. Smith agrees, and Rani leaves the house.

== Production ==
=== Background ===
Elisabeth Sladen was most well-known for her role as Sarah Jane Smith in Doctor Who. She was the main character of two spin-offs, one planned K-9 and Company, and one which aired fully, The Sarah Jane Adventures, the latter coming following Sladen's return to Doctor Who in the episode "School Reunion." The series followed Sarah Jane and several teen companions in fighting aliens. However, Sladen died during the filming of The Sarah Jane Adventures's fifth season, resulting in the series ending following The Man Who Never Was despite plans for the series to continue without acknowledgment of Sarah Jane or her character dying for several years.

Had the series continued, writer Russell T Davies said that CBBC had asked them to introduce a gay character, which he said he would do with Luke Smith as the character's actor, Tommy Knight, had intended to return to a larger role anyway.

=== Writing ===
At the request of producer Emily Cook, who was organizing a series of "tweetalongs" to various Doctor Who episodes and mini-episodes to release alongside them, "Farewell, Sarah Jane" was written to honor Sladen by having a funeral for her character. TheWrap attributed the COVID-19 pandemic to Russell T Davies having the time to write the special. Alongside honoring Sladen, Davies included various other revelations about characters. One such revelation is that Fifth Doctor companions Tegan Jovanka and Nyssa had begun a romantic relationship, despite the characters' endings putting them in different places, with Nyssa staying on a space station to liberate enslaved guards and Tegan leaving on Earth following a traumatic fight against Daleks.

Davies also revealed something he planned to reveal had the series continued as plan, that being that Luke Smith is gay, revealing that he had been married to his college roommate, Sanjay, for five years by the time of the funeral as Luke says that Sarah Jane was the one who realized that Sanjay had feelings for Luke. Other character developments included that Martha Jones and Mickey Smith had a son named August and that K-9 is with Ace, who now goes by Dorothy McShane.

The special was the first time that Sladen's passing had been canonized to result in Sarah Jane Smith's death, something which the series Doctor Who would not do until 2023 in the special "The Giggle" with the Fourteenth Doctor acknowledging it.

=== Casting ===
Jacob Dudman, who had previously narrated several Doctor Who audio stories, narrates the special, listing various guests of Sarah Jane's funeral whose actors did not return for the special. Several actors returned to the special, including Anjli Mohindra as Rani Chandra, Tommy Knight as Luke Smith, Daniel Anthony as Clyde Langer, Mina Anwar as Gita Chandra, Katy Manning as Jo Grant, and Sophie Aldred as Dorothy McShane.

Several characters were also mentioned whose actors did not return, including The Trickster, Dodo Chaplet, Tegan Jovanka, Nyssa, Kate Lethbridge-Stewart, Jack Harkness, Ben and Polly, Ian Chesterton, Barbara Wright, Martha Jones and Mickey Smith, who are revealed to have a son named August, Grace Holloway, Liz Shaw, Victoria Waterfield, and Sky Smith.

Mohindra went on to reprise the role of Rani in audio stories, citing her return for "Farewell, Sarah Jane" as a "springboard" for that decision in getting to see what her character has been doing since the end of The Sarah Jane Adventures.

=== Filming and Editing ===
"Farewell, Sarah Jane" was written, filmed, and edited over the course of a single weekend. Anjli Mohindra was at first worried about being able to play Rani Chandra again after such a long break, but filmed it anyway and found the process easy. Her scenes were filmed by her boyfriend, Sacha Dhawan, who was in Doctor Who as The Master. Daniel Anthony referred to filming his scene as an "emotional moment."

Russell T Davies said that the special was filmed with the blessing of Sladen's family, and that it could have been even bigger if he had the budget.

== Release ==
Having been announced the day prior, the special was released on YouTube on April 19, 2020 alongside a live "tweetalong" viewing of "The Stolen Earth" and "Journey's End," the two episodes of Doctor Who with which The Sarah Jane Adventures had a crossover that included several characters, including Sarah Jane, helping to fight Davros. This coincided with the anniversary of Sladen's death.

In the 60th Anniversary special, "The Giggle", it is confirmed that Sarah Jane has died, effectively confirming the events of "Farewell, Sarah Jane". In that episode, the newly bi-generated Fifteenth Doctor reminisces with the Fourteenth Doctor about all the loss that they have suffered up to that point in their lives. Among the names and events mentioned, the Fifteenth Doctor mentions that Sarah Jane is gone and both Doctors express their love for her.

== Reception ==
=== Viewership ===
The special received high viewership and was talked about heavily, so much so that "SubwaveNetwork," a reference to the Doctor Who story the special was paired with, trended as a hashtag at one number one worldwide.

=== Responses ===
The revelation that Tegan Jovanka and Nyssa were in a relationship was met with joy from fans, who posted to Twitter about it.

PinkNews rated the revelation that Luke Smith was in a relationship with man among the nine most queer moments in the history of Doctor Who.

Producer Emily Cook was pleased with the positive responses the story got, noting, "We knew we were creating something special so I'm glad it touched people in the way it did. Farewell, Sarah Jane is something fans often talk to me about now. I'm really proud of it."
