= CBBC idents =

History of idents used on CBBC

Throughout the years, Children's BBC, and later CBBC and CBeebies, have used a number of different identities. The branding of the stranded service is distinctive both in the past and at present.

== Pre Children's BBC ==
Prior to the launch of Children's BBC on 9 September 1985, BBC1 used some specialist branding for its children's strand. Continuity was done out of vision by the duty continuity announcer. However, between programmes, some special branding was put in use to reflect better the audience they were serving.

In the 1970s, the programme caption was changed to a blue and yellow variation featuring the faces of a boy and girl, with references to other programmes: Zebedee from The Magic Roundabout, Scooby-Doo, and title cards and logos from Play School and Blue Peter. The slide was in fact coloured by the NODD system used to produce the globe at the time. The slide was later changed in 1981 to a group of children staring at the caption in excitement, following the change of globe. Promotions now featured slides of balloons, with the programme name in the centre, and occasionally accompanied by the official static captions.

Just prior to the launch of Children's BBC, a BBC Micro B 3D Collage was introduced to generate computer generated stings for the children's strand. Such animations were used to introduce programmes, such as a spider spinning down onto a detonator triggering the words Hello from BBC1, and to link into promotions for further programmes, such as a group of sky divers falling from a plane to spell out a 'Later' caption. However, despite the graphics, programmes were still directly introduced by the BBC1 globe symbol, albeit occasionally accompanied by a choice of two different 14-note synthesized tunes.

== CBBC ==
=== Children's BBC (1985–1997) ===
==== Original Logo (1985–1991) ====
The first ident for Children's BBC once again made use of the BBC Micro B computer. The design featured the word 'Children's' on top of a large sprawled 'BBC' made up of the three colours red, green, and blue. In the ident, each letter of the BBC animated into the four note electronic soundtrack, with the Children's scrolling across afterwards. It originally had a blue background, but this was changed to black after a few months. The letters were also all turned yellow in autumn 1986, and were set against a white background whenever programmes were broadcast on BBC2.

From the launch of the branding, live in-vision continuity was generally broadcast by a dedicated team of presenters from a small self-op Presentation studio within the BBC1 network control area at Television Centre. The presenter would talk, interact with other characters, and view children’s pictures and letters, many of which would end up on the dressed back wall of the booth. They would also operate sound and vision mixers to partially direct their own links, although overall responsibility for transmission belonged to duty transmission staff in the adjacent network control room (NC1).

For times when Children's BBC aired on BBC2, the presenter would appear in-vision from the network's self-op continuity studio, although this was not usually dressed with set branding and remained plain. A running joke would develop where the duty presenter (i.e. Phillip Schofield) would present their links in a dinner jacket because BBC2 was considered more highbrow. Promotions were of no particular style, with the promotion usually voiced by the duty presenter and featuring only the programme name and title at the bottom of the screen.

On 21 September 1987, the BBC Micro ident was replaced by one created using Cel animation. In this ident, each of the letters of the word 'Children's' was allocated an image beginning with that letter. These images - a car, a horse, an ice cream, a lighthouse, a duck, a rocket, an elephant, a number nine, and a ship - would all be drawn on screen by yellow wispy lines, which after drawing all the animals would animate out to draw the 'BBC' caption. This ident was played out from tape, as opposed to the live BBC Micro ident. These pictures also appeared on other Children's BBC items, such as stationery: letters sent from the Children's BBC office to children would have these images superimposed upon the background of the document.

During this time, the presenters began to devise new ways of filling the time slots, with competitions and features taking precedence. Alongside these new additions, changes were being made to BBC Presentation, and the Broom Cupboard itself. In 1989, the continuity booth was equipped with NICAM digital stereo, and as a result, Children's BBC presentation was moved temporarily to a smaller studio, nicknamed the 'Boiler Room'. This was based in a reserve network control area (NC3) generally used between the two networks during maintenance or engineering work, from where the Broom Cupboard nickname had originated.

On 11 September 1989, the new ident was generated live on air by an Acorn Archimedes computer. The new ident featured a glossy, gold version of the familiar stylised BBC text, with pale green text for the 'Children's' caption and a dark green background superimposed with small stylised CBBC's in the same font as the main 'BBC' section of the logo. The ident formed up through the use of zig-zag lines and concentric circles, which continued to move around and between the letters.

==== Corporate Logo (1991–1997) ====
On 16 February 1991, BBC1 and 2 both relaunched with corporate branding packages based on a Virtual Globe and the antics of a numeral 2. Both packages had a similar promotional design and both featured a large numeral above a BBC logo at the bottom of the screen. As part of this relaunch, Children's BBC also received its own symbol based on this design. It was implemented at the beginning of the academic year on 9 September 1991. The new symbol took the emphasis away from the 'BBC' and placed it firmly with the 'Children's' part of the name. This new logo featured a large neon style letter replacing every other letter in the 'Children's' name, with the exception of 'D' which had a neon strip curve around the letter. This appeared against a dark background of an assortment of colours and accompanied by an upbeat soundtrack accompanied in some versions by a voice saying phrases such as "Tell that aardvark it's a wrap" and "Essential viewing coming up". The original electronic beat music was seen as too slow and dull originally, and so was replaced soon after with a more bombastic tune.

Accompanied with the new look, the Broom Cupboard received a makeover with new neon signage matching the new logo as well as the presenters name in a similar style to the logo. In addition to this, Children's BBC also received a corporate styling for promotions, slides, and menus. Promotions were kept the same as the channel they were broadcast on, however the menu and slide design was unique. The slide design, in line with BBC1 and 2, featured a sidebar down the left hand side of the screen, with the channel logo located in the top left hand corner of the screen, above a BBC corporate logo. The Children's BBC slides however, also had the Children's BBC logo inserted sideways into the sidebar, and images from the ident featured as the background to programme menus. These slides and menus were used prior to a start-up into Children's BBC, and for promotional use outside of Children's BBC itself, for example after the morning strand was completed.

Periodically, BBC Scotland had their own versions of the 1990s idents only used for local school holiday programmes around this time, by using the same ones as the network but with the Scotland branding incorporated into the ident beneath the BBC logo. These versions were used for regional breakfast and mid-morning opt-outs on BBC One Scotland and BBC Two Scotland from the launch of Children's BBC Scotland in June 1992 to July 1997.

This logo remained with Children's BBC until 1997, however the ident itself changed within half that time. In 1994, Children's BBC moved out of the soon-to-be-decommissioned network control area, bringing an end to the Broom Cupboard era, and into the larger Pres A studio which had been used for birthday slots, weekend, and holiday strands. To mark the move, CBBC, as it was becoming increasingly known informally by the presenters, commissioned a new ident. Launched on 5 September 1994, the logo remained, however was rendered in 3D and set at a slight angle and formed in chunks. This was accompanied by a 3D BBC logo located in the bottom right corner of the screen, and set against a moving rainbow coloured background with bits of black on it. This was later replaced in 1996 by a version on a moving yellow background, with a 2D grey BBC logo.

Throughout this era, a variety of logos were produced by BBC Manchester's Graphic design department for use, that featured computer-generated animations or cartoons and would include the Children's BBC logo in it somewhere, either as a whole or in part, and often accompanied by the BBC logo.

=== CBBC (1997–present) ===
==== Yellow animations (1997–2002) ====
CBBC block logo (4 October 1997 - 10 February 2002)

On 4 October 1997, the new BBC logo was launched by the corporation, and all of the BBC's channels and services received a makeover. CBBC was no exception, with a new logo and idents package to match a newly refurbished set for TC9. The new logo was seen everywhere on every channel in near identical design, so that the BBC's output was centralised, and as a result CBBC's logo featured a 'C' added in front of the BBC block logo, with the name of the service added after, be it CBBC One, CBBC Two, CBBC Choice, CBBC Scotland, or CBBC on Nickelodeon. Whereas before, CBBC tried to portray the end of one service and the beginning of another, which look made it feel like CBBC was taking over that service.

The new idents all featured a yellow and black colour scheme and featured a two-dimensional animation based around a surreal concept, an interesting design, or an adventure scene. Promotions for the service featured the same promotional style as the other services, with the CBBC logo at the bottom and the programme and channel details centred at the bottom for widescreen, which came later in early 2002. Also getting a makeover was the set in TC9. Again following the yellow and black theme, notable parts include large CBBC logos extending upright the columns, a large video wall made up of 12 televisions, and a desktop computer used to promote the CBBC website.

In addition to these idents, there was also idents for the programmes Saturday Aardvark and the CBBC Breakfast Show. BBC Scotland also had their own versions of the late 1990s idents only used for local school holiday programmes around this time, by using the same ones as the network but with the Scotland branding incorporated into the ident beneath the BBC logo. These versions were used for regional mid-morning opt-outs only on BBC Two Scotland from June 1998 to July 2000, since no Children's BBC Scotland opt outs were screened on BBC One Scotland since they moved to BBC Two Scotland for the remainder of the late 1990s.

Special idents were commissioned for Christmas, from 1997 to 1999, they consisted of a periscope type animation with festive images appearing, and from 2000 to 2001, there were various idents with a small penguin and a snowman in various scenarios. In summer, the 'CBBC HOT' name was used. An animation was also introduced for the end copyright, originally a coin spinning and falling over before turning into a thick line, this later became numerous signs moving towards the viewer from 1999 to 2002. On Monday 3 September 2001, CBBC switched to widescreen and as a result, the branding was altered. Some idents were withdrawn entirely, while the rest were sped up or mixed in with others to form montages that were used instead. The music was also changed, with two versions now used: for CBBC's older viewers (a fast-paced techno music) and for CBBC's younger viewers (a kid-friendly upbeat music), in what would soon be called CBeebies. Additionally, the idents for preschool programming had clips from Tweenies mixed in.

Special idents were made for CBBC on Choice before they started using the regular ones from 1998 to 2000. They were based on the first set of BBC Choice idents from 1998 consisting of three items with similar names, like boxer shorts, boxing gloves, and a boxer dog.

==== The CBBC Bugs and the CBBC Channel (2002–2005) ====
First CBBC channel logo (11 February 2002 - 29 September 2005)

On 11 February 2002, CBBC changed dramatically in both its look and remit. The day marked the launch of the CBBC Channel, resulting in a new platform for the well-known brand. Also launched at the same time was CBeebies, resulting in CBBC's target audience changing from 0–12 years of age to 6–12 years. To mark the occasion, a new identity was created for both channels. Designed by Lambie-Nairn, the bug idents featured green one-eyed moving bugs that contained the BBC logo as well as the purple, textured 'C'. The bugs could split into others, and would often be depicted either fighting amongst themselves, or as being split or separated multiple times. In the last few weeks of the 'Yellow Animations' ident package before the day of the rebrand, the bugs occasionally invaded its ident package and presentation, but at the same time, they also occasionally invaded the BBC One idents and presentation, which teased and confused viewers into the upcoming new look. On 1 September 2003, the bugs were given their own home in the idents, which was a blue lava lamp background containing a purple building used for the CBBC Channel and a pink building used for CBBC's morning and afternoon strands on BBC One and Two; both buildings are designed after BBC Television Centre.

In-vision was still used, with TC9 being used for links on BBC One and Two, and the CBBC Channel using TC2, however the set was changed to vivid backgrounds with blob shapes on, often with the idents playing in the background. Promotions also changed so branding only occurred at the end, at which a wavy blue banner at the bottom would flow it with programme details on, usually with a blob looking in from the side of the screen. The new channel also had a DOG featuring the BBC logo, with a blob containing the 'C' only in front. The DOG was not used on terrestrial links, although a clock was occasionally added for morning links, either on its own or located inside a static blob.

The bugs themselves were closely related to those designed for CBeebies, and almost identical for those designed for the Canadian television station owned by BBC Worldwide, BBC Kids, which used yellow and blue for the bugs instead of green and purple. This branding launched on 5 November 2001, 3 months before CBBC and CBeebies, and would remain until 2011.

==== CBBC's "green gumdrop" (2005–2007) ====
CBBC logo (30 September 2005 - 2 September 2007)

The traditional bugs look lasted until 29 September 2005, when the blob concept was redesigned the next day, on the 30th. A single blob (which resembles a gumdrop) was now used: it featured a larger and plainer 'C' letter and was turned into a three-dimensional object, which would zoom around a screen often accompanied by a ball from which many arrows could point with light blue lightning flying around inside a dark blue spiral background. The idents also featured the CBBC stars in the purple background with various floating objects (such as the cash registers for Kerching!, the spiked heart balloons for Tracy Beaker, or the flying birds for Raven), before the background turns over to reveal the CBBC logo at the end of each ident. This style was changed so that the end screen changed to a single shot of the bug with the programme name below, and the DOG was also updated. In-vision for the channel continued to be used, however, it was used less and less: CBBC moved out of TC9 in December 2006 to TC12, where the presenter would just stand in front of a bluescreen while only a fixed camera is used.

==== Stylised CBBC (2007–2016) ====
CBBC logo (3 September 2007 - 13 March 2016)

CBBC relaunched again on 3 September 2007, with a new logo revolving around the letters of CBBC, each in a different style. A new set of idents followed these up, revolving around scenes including each of the 4 stylised letters before coming together at the end. These scenes could involve cartoon figures (including the animated CBBC programmes like Shaun the Sheep and one of the animated segments from Tracy Beaker, as well as the online game Adventure Rock), or stars of current CBBC programmes (which were Barney Harwood, Basil Brush, James Mackenzie, Daniel Anthony, Dani Harmer, Ed Petrie, Oucho T. Cactus, Mark Speight, Kirsten O'Brien, Richard Hammond, Sam Nixon, Mark Rhodes, Caroline Flack, Gethin Jones, Ayo Akinwolere, Zöe Salmon, Bel Powley, Moustafa Palazli, Rachel Petladwala, Ben Kerfoot, Charlene Osuagwu, and Jonny Freeman in the idents). Numerous different styles were made involving the different scenes, and were added regularly to reflect programmes in March and October 2008 with two more being released in early 2009 relating to the third series of M.I. High and new series Richard Hammond's Blast Lab.

CBBC also introduced a robot mascot named "Mini Zib", who appeared in idents and promotions. Children could also make their own versions, the so-called Mash Up, on the CBBC website, and indeed some of these were added to the main set. At the end of this sequence, a two-dimensional cartoon style endboard was added that contained the CBBC logo animating into place, against a white background with the green zig-zag lines of the look animating around the edge of the screen. This was altered on 10 September 2010, when the CBBC logo was given a 3D glossy look, and as a result the end boards were changed to a fully formed CBBC logo moving around on the green bars on the screen. In 2013, they added new variations of the idents which mixed up a few idents, or at least changed one thing about it, including some lift sequences (taken from the M.I. High scene from the previous idents) to promote some programmes, such as Scooby-Doo! Mystery, Inc. and The Johnny and Inel Show.

Accompanying these idents at the end of the CBBC Channel were two cartoon characters. These, in the form of a dancing fox and a hairy monster, would point out additional CBBC services. This would normally consist of pointing out the CBBC website and, if currently broadcasting, the CBBC Channel. Promotions consisted of the video with the CBBC logo, programme title, and times appearing at the end on the green zig-zag lines that accompanied the channel. This was altered in 2010, so the video would shrink into a box contained within the white and green lines where the CBBC logo now originated at the end of the idents. The programme title would now be overlaid the white background, rather than be incorporated into the design. The DOG for the CBBC Channel was also changed to the new logo, however it retained its green colour scheme, and would often animate, with the letters popping out and in at regular intervals.

On 13 September 2014, CBBC introduced a new set of idents after seven years, whilst retaining the existing logo. The new idents featured various animated scenes containing references to the programming, like the previous look from 2007 to 2014.

The new look was created by the CBBC marketing team, with Red Bee Media designing the new logo and idents, and Fallon, who created the new TV trails that were used prior to launch.

==== Just Imagine (2016–2023) ====
CBBC logo (14 March 2016 - 14 March 2023)

On 14 March 2016, CBBC rebranded with a new logo that was similar to BBC Three's then-current logo, dropping the logo that had been used for the last eight and a half years. New idents were introduced, a range of live action and animated ones which consists of everyday situations in the modern era. The four-note signature jingle was introduced in a similar way to ABC in the United States (in which the original was used from 1998 to 2021), albeit with some modifications.

On 5 January 2022, when CBBC returned to its pre-2016 hours, the logo was slightly updated with the 2021 BBC blocks and having chameleon-style branding, which was only used for promos, trailers, slides, end-credit promotions and EPGs. However, the 2016 ident package and presentation were still kept until its full rebranding in March 2023.

==== The Flooms (2023–present) ====
Current CBBC logo (15 March 2023 - present)

Following the BBC corporate rebrand in 2021, CBBC finally updated with the new logo on 15 March 2023. The idents featured square, snake-like cylinders named the Flooms. Like other BBC channels, the company's Chameleon branding design is used, with the new BBC logo is always at the top, whilst the word "CBBC" in BBC Reith Sans is always at the bottom.

== CBeebies ==
=== Bugbies (2002–2023) ===
First and longest-serving CBeebies logo (11 February 2002 - 14 March 2023)

CBeebies was launched with the CBBC Channel on 11 February 2002, with an original age range of preschool children only. Following changes within the BBC Children's department, this changed to ages up to 6, with CBBC targeting ages 6–12. The logo the channel had launched with lasted for 21 years, making the logo and branding the longest-running branding package for a BBC service ahead of the BBC Learning Zone strand (18 years from 1997 to 2015) and the BBC Two 1991 idents (14 years from 1991 to 2001, 2014 to 2018). Select idents dating back to 2005 have been in use as recently as March 2023, on par with the length of time the BBC Learning Zone ident was used for.

The idents for the channel, designed by Lambie-Nairn, are the same as at launch and consist of yellow blobs (also known as the Bugbies), the opposite to the green blobs launched with the CBBC channel with a much younger feel, as befits the target audience. In the last few weeks before CBeebies launched on the 11th of February 2002, a CBeebies bug would occasionally appear on-screen briefly in either CBBC's 'yellow' idents or in the presentation during the preschool programming, which teased young viewers that CBeebies was coming soon. The yellow blobs would bounce around gently to each other in a brightly coloured and patterned environment, with the CBeebies logo located in the centre top of the screen. The soundtrack was also gentle, with children's voices calling out the channel name, and the whole look was deliberately meant to be parallel, yet completely different from its sister channel, CBBC. In addition to these idents, some more were created featuring the presenters bouncing the CBeebies logo around like a beach ball, and also some which featured the blobs taking part in time related idents, such as sleeping on the moon in the Bedtime Hour, drinking milk at Lunchtime, or riding a bike in Big Fun Time. Some idents are specific to strands of programmes, such as Discover and Do. CBeebies, like the 'CBBC block' before it, make use of in-vision continuity links, however these are not presented by the CBeebies directors, but are recorded rather than broadcast live. The presenters make use of a large, colourful space with smooth lines and everyday objects, which is again appropriate to the age range. In 2016, new idents were made for each block (except for Get Set Go and Lunchtime), replacing the old ones and the lava lamp background idents were rarely shown. Idents featuring the CBeebies House with it changing to effect the current season have been used from 2016 to 2023.

Promotions originally featured a similar style as CBBC, with a patterned and coloured bar running across the bottom of the end of the promotion, featuring the title and CBeebies logo. This was changed after the 2007 CBBC rebrand to three pattered hills overlapping each at the bottom of the screen. From 2009, the CBeebies logo and programme name would be contained within the centre hill, with the left hill taken up by a yellow blob containing a clock with the time of the programme on, and the right occasionally containing details such as whether the programme was new. The channel also uses a DOG also known as the screen bugs (and has done since its launch), in the form of the yellow CBeebies logo, which rotates during the weekday segments at regular intervals to reveal a symbol for the segment; for example, the symbol for Discover and Do features a bug looking up at a rainbow. In the past, the channel has used different rotating DOGs including a dancing bug to promote Boogie Beebies.

In late 2021, the logo was slightly updated with the 2021 BBC blocks and having chameleon-style branding, which was only used for promos, trailers, slides, end-credit promotions and EPGs. However, the 2002 ident package and presentation were still kept until its full rebranding in March 2023.

=== Square bugs (2023–present) ===
Current CBeebies logo, used since 2023.

Following the BBC corporate rebrand in 2021, CBeebies finally updated with a new logo on 15 March 2023. The channel swapped out the designs for the yellow bugs with more square-like designs to match the new BBC logo, and the signature soundtrack was reimagined for the new branding. Like other BBC channels, the company's Chameleon branding design is used, with the new BBC logo is always at the top, whilst the word "CBeebies" in BBC Reith Sans is always at the bottom.

== See also ==
- History of BBC television idents
