= The Sarah Jane Adventures =

British science fiction television series (2007–2011)

- Genre: Science fiction
- Created by: Russell T Davies
- Showrunners: Russell T Davies; Gareth Roberts; Phil Ford
- Starring: Elisabeth Sladen; Yasmin Paige; Tommy Knight; Daniel Anthony; Anjli Mohindra; Sinead Michael
- Voices of: Alexander Armstrong; John Leeson
- Theme music composer: Murray Gold
- Composers: Sam Watts; Dan Watts
- Country of origin: United Kingdom
- Original language: English
- No. of series: 5
- No. of episodes: 53 (27 serials) + 1 short (list of serials)

Production
- Executive producers: Russell T Davies; Julie Gardner; Phil Collinson; Piers Wenger; Nikki Wilson
- Producers: Brian Minchin; Nikki Wilson; Matthew Bouch; Susie Liggat
- Running time: 60 minutes (New Year's Day special); 25–30 minutes (series); 5 minutes (Comic Relief special)
- Production company: BBC Cymru Wales

Original release
- Network: CBBC (2007–2011); BBC HD (2009–2011); BBC One; BBC One HD (2010–2011)
- Release: 1 January 2007 – 18 October 2011

Related
- Doctor Who; Torchwood; Whoniverse

The Sarah Jane Adventures is a British science fiction television programme produced by BBC Cymru Wales for CBBC, created by Russell T Davies, and starring Elisabeth Sladen. The programme is a spin-off of the long-running BBC science fiction programme Doctor Who, and the second primarily targeted towards children after Totally Doctor Who. It focuses on the adventures of Sarah Jane Smith, an investigative journalist living in Ealing, London, who, as a young woman, had numerous adventures across time and space with the Doctor. The show ran for five years until Sladen's death in 2011.

The series debuted on BBC One with a 60-minute special, "Invasion of the Bane", on 1 January 2007, and broadcast until Sladen's death in 2011. It was nominated for a British Academy Children's Award in 2008 in the Drama category, and for a BAFTA Cymru in 2009 in the Children's Drama category. The programme won a Royal Television Society 2010 award for Best Children's Drama.

As of 2024, all episodes are on BBC iPlayer in the United Kingdom.

== Series ==
A full series of ten 25-minute episodes began on 24 September 2007. The first series consisted of five two-part stories, and a second series, comprising six two-part stories, began airing on 29 September 2008. A third series, of six two-part stories (with Russell T Davies serving as executive producer) aired from 15 October to 20 November 2009.

The fourth series was aired from 11 October 2010. An episode of another spin-off series, Sarah Jane's Alien Files, was shown immediately after each of the first episodes of the stories.

Filming for three of six two-part serials planned for the fifth series was completed prior to Elisabeth Sladen's death on 19 April 2011. The BBC stated that no further episodes would be produced. This final series was broadcast between 3 and 18 October 2011 on Mondays and Tuesdays.

== Background and development ==
In 2006, Children's BBC expressed an interest in producing a Doctor Who spin-off. Their initial idea was "a drama based on the idea of a young Doctor Who", but Russell T Davies vetoed this. "Somehow, the idea of a fourteen year old Doctor, on Gallifrey inventing sonic screwdrivers, takes away from the mystery and intrigue of who he is and where he came from", said Davies. He suggested instead a series based on the Doctor's former companion Sarah Jane Smith.

The character of Sarah Jane Smith, played by Sladen, appeared in Doctor Who from 1973 to 1976, alongside both Jon Pertwee as the Third Doctor and Tom Baker as the Fourth Doctor. A pilot episode for another Doctor Who spin-off series, K-9 and Company, made in 1981, featured Sarah Jane and the robot dog K9; a full series was never commissioned. Sarah Jane and K9 returned to Doctor Who in various media many times over the years, most notably in the 20th anniversary special "The Five Doctors" (1983), and in episodes "School Reunion" (2006), "The Stolen Earth" / "Journey's End" (2008) and "The End of Time" (2010).

Sarah Jane is frequently voted the most popular Doctor Who companion by both Doctor Who fans and members of the general public. The series was first confirmed to be in development by the BBC's in-house newsletter, Ariel, in early August 2006. These early rumours were associated with the working title Sarah Jane Investigates.

K9's only appearances in the show's first two series were a cameo in the special and an appearance in the last episode of the first series. This was due to the concurrent development of the independently produced children's series, K9, which features a remodelled version of K9 with only indirect nods to Doctor Who. In 2009, K9 appeared with The Sarah Jane Adventures cast in a sketch for Comic Relief, and K9 appeared in six episodes of the third series, followed by two more appearances in the fourth series. He did not appear at all in series 5.

=== Production ===
Production on the full series began in April 2007. Two of the five two-part stories were scripted by the special's co-writer Gareth Roberts. Bad Girls and New Captain Scarlet writer Phil Ford wrote two stories and Phil Gladwin wrote one. Creator and executive producer Russell T Davies was going to write one story but was forced to drop out due to other work commitments.

== Tenth anniversary ==
For the tenth anniversary of the show, an event was held 29 July 2017 at Cardiff University Students' Union, with proceeds going to Ty Hafan Hospice for Children. A total of £6643.35 was raised by the sale of tickets to the event and merchandise. Members of the cast and crew that took part in the event were Tommy Knight, Anjli Mohindra, Yasmin Paige, Sinead Michael, Mina Anwar, Katy Manning, Paul Marc Davis, Phil Ford, Gary Russell, Joe Lidster, Sam Watts, Richard Wisker, Cheryl Rowlands, Scott Handcock, Brian Miller, John Leeson, Mat Irvine and Chris Johnson. The event was recorded and was released onto DVD and Blu-ray and could be bought exclusively through the event's website.

== Cast and crew ==
Actor	Character	Series				
Actor	Character	1	2	3	4	5
Elisabeth Sladen	Sarah Jane Smith	Main	Main	Main	Main	Main
Yasmin Paige	Maria Jackson	Main (Note: Paige is billed as a series regular in the first serial of the second series before leaving by its conclusion. She appears once more in the fourth serial.)	Main			
Tommy Knight	Luke Smith	Main (Note: Knight last appears as a regular in the first serial of the fourth series. He makes regular cameo appearances throughout the rest of the series before returning in the final serials of the fourth and fifth series.)	Main	Main	Main	Main
Daniel Anthony	Clyde Langer	Main	Main	Main	Main	Main
Anjli Mohindra	Rani Chandra		Main	Main	Main	Main
Sinead Michael	Sky Smith					Main

Main cast of series 1 (left to right) Maria, Luke, Sarah Jane and Clyde

Main cast of series 2–5 (left to right) Rani, Luke, Sarah Jane, Clyde and Sky (Series 5 only)

In addition to Sladen, the first series of the programme stars Yasmin Paige as Maria Jackson, Sarah Jane's 13-year-old neighbour in Ealing, west London, and Tommy Knight as a boy named Luke, who is adopted by Sarah Jane at the conclusion of the introductory story. The third member of Sarah Jane's young entourage is 14-year-old Clyde Langer, played by Daniel Anthony, who is introduced in the first episode of the full series. Actress Porsha Lawrence Mavour briefly played Maria's friend, Kelsey Hooper, in the 2007 New Year's Day special Invasion of the Bane which was created before the start of the series. Maria and her family are written out of the series in the first story of the second series, The Last Sontaran, but Maria and her father return briefly in the second part of The Mark of the Berserker. In the second story of that series, The Day of the Clown, a few new regular cast members are introduced: Rani Chandra and her parents, Haresh, and Gita (played by Anjli Mohindra, Ace Bhatti, and Mina Anwar, respectively). This happened as the character Alan Jackson (Joseph Millson) left the series, along with Chrissie (Juliet Cowan) and Maria Jackson (Yasmin Paige).

Joseph Millson appears throughout the first series as Maria's recently separated father, Alan, with Chrissie Jackson, Maria's mother, played by Juliet Cowan. One other regular is Alexander Armstrong of comedy duo Armstrong and Miller, who provides the voice of Mr Smith, an extraterrestrial computer in Sarah Jane's attic. The 2007 special featured Samantha Bond as the scheming villain Mrs Wormwood and Jamie Davis as her PR agent Davey. The first series included among its guest cast Jane Asher as Sarah Jane's childhood friend Andrea Yates, Floella Benjamin as Professor Rivers, who returned in Series 2, Series 3 and Series 5, and Phyllida Law as Bea Nelson-Stanley. The second series guest starred Bradley Walsh as an evil alien clown in the story The Day of the Clown and Russ Abbot as a sinister astrologer in Secrets of the Stars. Also appearing in the second series were Gary Beadle and Jocelyn Jee Esien, who portrayed Clyde's parents Paul and Carla in The Mark of the Berserker; Esien reprised her role briefly in Series 4 and more prominently in series 5. Samantha Bond returned as Wormwood in Enemy of the Bane.

The original executive producers for The Sarah Jane Adventures were Phil Collinson, Russell T Davies and Julie Gardner. Susie Liggat produced the pilot, but Matthew Bouch worked as producer of the series. Co-writer Gareth Roberts, writing in Doctor Who Magazine, said, "We're all determined that this will be a big, full-blooded drama; that nobody should ever think of it as 'just' a children's programme." Sue Nott was the executive producer of the second series for CBBC.

In December 2007, the BBC released a statement that Julie Gardner would be replaced by Piers Wenger as executive producer for Doctor Who in January 2009, but that she would continue to executive-produce Torchwood and The Sarah Jane Adventures through 2008.

The fourth series in 2010 was executive produced by Russell T Davies and Nikki Wilson, and the producers were Brian Minchin and frequent writer Phil Ford. During this series, Cyril Nri was introduced as a new recurring character called The Shopkeeper. The production team remained in place for the completed episodes of Series 5, which were shot concurrently with Series 4. The show's abbreviated fifth and final series introduced a new main character named Sky, played by Sinead Michael. The episode that introduced Sky also featured a return appearance by the Shopkeeper, but the fact that the second half of the series was never produced left his story arc, as well as other ongoing plot points, unresolved. A special edition of Doctor Who Magazine, The Sarah Jane Companion Volume 3, published in August 2012, detailed the plotlines of the three unfilmed stories.

=== Doctor Who characters ===
As well as Sarah Jane, some characters from the past or current run of Doctor Who appear in The Sarah Jane Adventures. K9, voiced by John Leeson, guest stars in the New Year's special as well as the series 1 finale, appears regularly in the third series, and makes two further appearances in series 4. The Doctor appears twice in the series, with David Tennant featuring in The Wedding of Sarah Jane Smith (2009), and his successor Matt Smith in Death of the Doctor (2010). The latter episode also guest stars Katy Manning as Jo Jones (née Grant), reprising the role she played alongside the Third Doctor (Jon Pertwee) between 1971 and 1973. The episode Sky was originally to have featured Smith, but scheduling prevented his appearance. Nicholas Courtney appears as Brigadier Sir Alistair Gordon Lethbridge-Stewart in Enemy of the Bane (2008), his final appearance as the character prior to his death in 2011. Various newsreader characters who appear across Davies' tenure as Doctor Who showrunner also appear in The Sarah Jane Adventures, namely Lachele Carl and Trinity Wells, Jason Mohammad and Anthony Debaeck.

Numerous others have been referenced in dialogue. Several former companions of the Doctor are referenced in the story Death of the Doctor, and the episode also includes brief on-screen flashbacks showing the Third, Fourth and Tenth Doctors. Companion Harry Sullivan is referenced separately in dialogue on several occasions and a photograph of the character is visible in one episode. In an issue of Doctor Who Magazine, Sophie Aldred was read an email from Russell T. Davies, in which he declared his plans to bring Ace into a story had the show continued, and she was alluded to at the end of The Death of the Doctor when the fates of Harry Sullivan, Ian Chesterton, Barbara Wright, Ben Jackson, Polly, Tegan Jovanka, and Ace are revealed.

== Episodes ==
Series	Episodes	Originally released (UK)		Average viewers (millions)
Series	Episodes	First released	Last released	Average viewers (millions)
New Year's special		1 January 2007		2.90
1	10	24 September 2007	19 November 2007	1.16
2	12	29 September 2008	8 December 2008	0.79
Comic Relief special		13 March 2009		8.30
3	12	15 October 2009	20 November 2009	1.01
4	12	11 October 2010	16 November 2010	0.80
5	6	3 October 2011	18 October 2011	0.65
Reunion special		9 April 2020		—N/a

The Sarah Jane Adventures was first seen by its original British audience in the form of a 60-minute New Year's Day special in 2007, titled "Invasion of the Bane", which was co-written by Russell T Davies and Gareth Roberts. "Invasion of the Bane" was not a pilot, although the story does contains many conventional introductory elements common to pilots. Creator Russell T Davies has commented upon the exceptional broadcast situation, saying "Sarah Jane Adventures is slightly unusual in that it was commissioned before we'd written the script. If we'd written a load of rubbish, they'd still have had to make it." He refers to "Invasion of the Bane" simply as the "first episode". The story focused on Sarah Jane's investigation of a popular and addictive soft drink called Bubble Shock!

Series one of the show aired in September of that year, consisting of five two-part half-hour stories. Individual half-hour episodes aired once a week on BBC One, with episodes airing a week ahead on children's digital channel CBBC. The final part aired in November 2007. The second series started in September 2008 using the same format, with six stories instead of five, ending the series in December. The third series started 15 October 2009, twice weekly (Thursdays and Fridays) on BBC One from 15 October to 20 November. The fourth series aired from 11 October 2010. The first of each story pair was accompanied by an episode of Sarah Jane's Alien Files, a set of 25-minute episodes in which a member of the cast updates Mr Smith's database about certain aliens. It accompanied series 4 of the programme.

Due to the illness of Elisabeth Sladen, and her death on 19 April 2011, filming for the second half of the fifth series, which was due to air in the autumn of 2011, was postponed and later cancelled. Filming for three stories of the fifth series had been finished, and thus post-production on these stories was completed. The final series was aired from 3 to 18 October 2011 on CBBC and ended with a tribute to Elisabeth Sladen in the form of a video montage of scenes from the series and a couple of episodes of Doctor Who and the ending text "And the story goes on... forever."

The script of the unfilmed Sarah Jane Adventures episode "The Thirteenth Floor" was rewritten and broadcast as an episode of Wizards vs Aliens.

=== "Farewell, Sarah Jane" ===
On 19 April 2020, a special 13-minute webcast mini episode entitled "Farewell, Sarah Jane" aired on Doctor Who's social media channels as a tribute to Elisabeth Sladen. During this story, a memorial service is held for Sarah Jane, attended by Luke, Clyde, Rani, Sky and Maria, and accompanied by their friends and families (among them several of the Doctor's former companions). Apart from a small interruption from the Trickster, the memorial goes smoothly, and after the guests say goodbye, Luke, Clyde and Rani revisit 13 Bannerman Road. Rani stays behind to have a final conversation with Mr Smith, expressing her belief that Sarah Jane is once again travelling with the Doctor (whose absence Jo Grant commented on, speculating that both of the Doctor's hearts would break to be there). It was written by Russell T Davies.

The story acts as an epilogue to the series, narrated by Jacob Dudman and featuring Tommy Knight, Daniel Anthony, Anjli Mohindra, Katy Manning, Mina Anwar all in their respective roles from the series. It also includes Sophie Aldred, who portrayed Ace, a companion to the Seventh Doctor.

== Spin-offs ==
=== Rani Takes on the World ===
On 19 July 2022, it was announced that Big Finish Productions would produce an audio spin-off of The Sarah Jane Adventures set to release in April 2023, which features Rani Chandra (Anjli Mohindra) as the protagonist. The audio spin-off is set 15 years after the events of the series with the first three stories featuring Clyde Langer (Daniel Anthony) as well as Gita Chandra (Mina Anwar), Rani's mother.

On 28 March 2023, Big Finish Productions additionally announced a sequel boxset set to release in January 2024 titled The Revenge of Wormwood with Mrs Wormwood (Samantha Bond) to reprise her role as the villain from the television series. The second boxset will also feature the return of Luke Smith (Tommy Knight).

== Reception ==
The Sarah Jane Adventures has been generally well received by critics and the viewing public. At the end of the first series, Abi Grant of The Daily Telegraph wrote: "With the debate about the future of children's TV still rumbling on, this is what the BBC does best, and despite lacking the production values of Doctor Who, it's still top tea-time programming." Daniel Martin of The Guardian described the show as looking very promising and more convincing than another Doctor Who spinoff Torchwood. Review website DVD Talk called the series "wonderful", "thoughtful" and "imaginative children's entertainment" that was highly recommended. The series also received praise for its willingness to tackle "darker themes [such as] Alzheimer's, homelessness and loss."

"It's not often that you get a character who appeals across the generations. What SJA gets absolutely right is that Sarah Jane remains immediately recognisable as this tenacious reporter of old, but with an added maternal touch that enchants its target audience. Its absence in the schedules is going to be keenly felt."

— David Brown of Radio Times on the last series

At Metacritic, the first series received a generally favourable score of 66 out of 100 based on five critics. As the series progressed reviews became slightly more positive with DVD Talk reviewer David Cornelius saying that the "second series is even better than the first." However Eric Profancik from DVD Verdict stated that the second series suffered from "poor scripts and horrible acting", criticising it for having "simple plots, too many conveniences and having corny humour." Series three is described by Guy Clapperton of review site ScreenJabber.com as being slightly braver than its predecessors, while Bullz-eye.com described it as "a sweet, fun little show, with some neat ideas" with "its heart very much in the right place." Reviews for the final series were sympathetic for the series' end and the unavoidably incomplete nature of the series (following the death of Elisabeth Sladen) and its story arcs. Stephen Kelly from The Guardian said that it was "a fitting tribute to Elisabeth Sladen" and has occupied a "unique place in the Whoniverse".

== Awards and nominations ==
Year	Ceremony	Category	Nominee(s)	Result	Ref.
2008	Royal Television Society	Children's Drama	The Sarah Jane Adventures	Nominated	
2008	SFX Awards	Best TV Actress	Elisabeth Sladen	Nominated	
2008	British Academy Children's Awards	Drama	Matthew Bouche, Alice Troughton, and Gareth Roberts	Nominated	
2009	British Academy Children's Awards	Drama	Nikki Smith, Graeme Harper, and Gareth Roberts	Nominated	
2009	Royal Television Society	Children's Drama	The Sarah Jane Adventures	Nominated	
2010	British Academy Children's Awards	Drama	Nikki Wilson, Joss Agnew, and Gareth Roberts	Nominated	
2010	British Academy Children's Awards	Writer	Phil Ford	Nominated	
2010	British Academy Children's Awards	BAFTA Kids' Vote – Television	The Sarah Jane Adventures	Nominated	
2010	Royal Television Society	Children's Drama	The Sarah Jane Adventures	Nominated	
2010	BAFTA Cymru	Interactive	The Sarah Jane Adventures (website)	Won	
2011	British Academy Children's Awards	Drama	Russell T Davies, Brian Minchin, and Ashley Way	Nominated	
2011	British Academy Children's Awards	Writer	Phil Ford	Nominated	
2011	British Academy Children's Awards	BAFTA Kids' Vote – Television	The Sarah Jane Adventures	Nominated	
2011	Royal Television Society	Children's Drama	The Sarah Jane Adventures	Won	
2011	BAFTA Cymru	Children's Programme	Brian Minchin for Death of the Doctor	Won	
2012	British Academy Children's Awards	BAFTA Kids' Vote – Television	The Sarah Jane Adventures	Nominated	
2012	British Academy Children's Awards	Writer	Phil Ford	Nominated	
2012	BAFTA Cymru	Children's Programme	Brian Minchin for The Curse of Clyde Langer	Nominated	
2012	Royal Television Society	Children's Drama	The Sarah Jane Adventures series 5	Nominated	
2012	SFX Awards	Elisabeth Sladen Award	The Sarah Jane Adventures, for "excellence in the field of children's fantasy"	Won	

== International broadcast ==
BBC Worldwide's children's channel in Canada, BBC Kids, began broadcasting The Sarah Jane Adventures with "Invasion of the Bane" on 13 January 2008, airing the rest of the series back-to-back on Sundays thereafter. The South African channel SABC 2 started airing the series beginning on 9 February 2008. The Hong Kong channel ATV World, which has also aired Doctor Who and Torchwood, aired this series starting 17 February 2008. The first series began airing on Sci Fi in the USA beginning on 11 April 2008, but this is the only series broadcast on American television as of Summer 2010, though later series have continued to be released on DVD in America without a prior television broadcast. In Australia, The Sarah Jane Adventures started on 31 October 2008 on Nickelodeon Australia. In Brazil, the show started airing on 19 November 2012 on TV Cultura, right after their broadcast of Doctor Who series 6 ended. It also screens in New Zealand on Nickelodeon New Zealand, and in Belgium on Ketnet. In 2013 the show started airing on JeemTV in Arabic. Various seasons of the series has also been broadcast multiple times on the Swedish children's Channel 'Barnkanalen' in Swedish.

== Merchandising ==
=== Toys ===
Character Options have been awarded a licence to produce The Sarah Jane Adventure play sets, action figures, and a 'Sonic Lipstick' toy. Four 2-figure sets have been released: Sarah Jane and Star Poet; Sarah Jane and General Kudlak; Sarah Jane and Child Slitheen and Sarah Jane and Graske. Also released are Sarah Jane's Sonic Lipstick with Watch Scanner and Alien Communicator. Character Options have now discontinued the range due to lack of customer interest.

=== Battles in Time trading cards Adventurer set ===
The Adventurer The Sarah Jane Adventures series of Doctor Who: Battles in Time trading cards was a bonus set of 10 limited edition, additional cards (plus one cover card) released exclusively with issue 62 and packaged in a clear plastic wrap.

With the Doctor Who: Battles in Time (magazine) being extended beyond its original number of proposed issues, the Adventurer The Sarah Jane Adventures cards saw the series expanded once more by the inclusion of this popular spin-off series which frequently crossed over to the parent series.

The Adventurer series consisted of 10 individual Common cards referenced by the prefix SJA, cards also showed their individual series number 01–10

Card No.	Card name
0	Introductory Card
1	Sarah Jane Smith (and Friends)
2	Mrs Wormwood
3	Commander Kaagh
4	The Gorgon
5	The Trickster (with the Graske)
6	Korst Gogg Thex Lutiven-Day Slitheen
7	General Kudlak
8	Odd Bob
9	Mr Smith
10	The Brigadier

=== Audio adventures ===
Ten audiobooks have been released on CD, all but the last two read by the series lead, Elisabeth Sladen, who read them in the first person in character as Sarah Jane. The final two books, released in November 2011 after Sladen's death, were read by Daniel Anthony and Anjli Mohindra, respectively, though not as their characters.

The first two were the first time that BBC Audiobooks had commissioned new content for exclusive release on audio.

A 20-minute mini-episode in two parts called "The Monster Hunt" written by Trevor Baxendale and read by Anjli Mohindra was made especially for the Monster Hunt game on the Sarah Jane Adventures website. Two more comics were released "Return of the Krulius" and "Defending Bannerman Road". All comics were available as a pdf and a free mp3 download on the official Sarah Jane Adventures website.

Title	Author	Release date	Reader
The Glittering Storm	Stephen Cole	5 November 2007	Elisabeth Sladen
The Thirteenth Stone	Justin Richards	5 November 2007	Elisabeth Sladen
The Time Capsule	Peter Anghelides	13 November 2008	Elisabeth Sladen
The Ghost House	Stephen Cole	13 November 2008	Elisabeth Sladen
The White Wolf	Gary Russell	3 September 2009	Elisabeth Sladen
The Shadow People	Scott Handcock	3 September 2009	Elisabeth Sladen
Deadly Download	Jason Arnopp	7 October 2010	Elisabeth Sladen
Wraith World	Cavan Scott & Mark Wright	7 October 2010	Elisabeth Sladen
Children of Steel	Martin Day	10 November 2011	Daniel Anthony
Judgement Day	Scott Gray	10 November 2011	Anjli Mohindra
The Sarah Jane Adventures Collection (Complete Audio Collection)	Stephen Cole; Justin Richards; Gary Russell; Cavan Scott; Mark Wright; Peter Anghelides; Jason Arnopp; Martin Day; Scott Gray	24 November 2011	Elisabeth Sladen; Daniel Anthony; Anjli Mohindra

=== Comics ===
Five The Sarah Jane Adventures comics were released on the official Sarah Jane Adventures website. Four of them were comic adventures with audio narration by Anjli Mohindra. A pdf document and a MP3 audio track was available to download of the comics. An online version of The Silver Bullet, presented, in full, a comic written and drawn by Clyde and briefly seen in, the episode The Curse of Clyde Langer.

Title	Author	Artist	Release date	Read by	Link
Monster Hunt: The Beginning	Trevor Baxendale		2009	Anjli Mohindra	Monster Hunt: The Beginning on the BBC website
Monster Hunt: The Ending	Trevor Baxendale		2009	Anjli Mohindra	
Return of the Krulius	Trevor Baxendale	Neil Roberts	2009	Anjli Mohindra	
Defending Bannerman Road	Trevor Baxendale		2010	Anjli Mohindra	
The Silver Bullet			2011		The Silver Bullet on the BBC website

=== Novelisations ===
The Sarah Jane Adventures merchandising revived the concept of the novelisation, which had been part of the Doctor Who franchise from the 1970s to the 1990s (principally under the editorship of author and former Who script editor Terrance Dicks). The first series and most of the second were adapted in this way, but later series saw only a few releases and a transition from print to e-books.

Title	Author	Release date
Invasion of the Bane	Terrance Dicks	1 November 2007
Revenge of the Slitheen	Rupert Laight	1 November 2007
Eye of the Gorgon	Phil Ford	1 November 2007
Warriors of Kudlak	Gary Russell	1 November 2007
Whatever Happened to Sarah Jane?	Rupert Laight	6 November 2008
The Lost Boy	Gary Russell	6 November 2008
The Last Sontaran	Phil Ford	6 November 2008
The Day of the Clown	Phil Ford	6 November 2008
The Wedding of Sarah Jane Smith	Gareth Roberts	5 November 2009
The Nightmare Man (e-book only)	Joseph Lidster	25 November 2010
Death of the Doctor (e-book only)	Gary Russell	25 November 2010

In September 2010, Pearson Education published four simplified novelisations based on stories from the third series:

Title	Author
Judoon Afternoon (Prisoner of the Judoon)	Trevor Baxendale
Haunted House (The Eternity Trap)	Trevor Baxendale
Painting Peril (Mona Lisa's Revenge)	Trevor Baxendale
Blathereen Dream (The Gift)	Trevor Baxendale

=== Magazines and books ===
Although there has never been a Sarah Jane Adventures magazine there have been three special editions of the Doctor Who Magazine, focused on The Sarah Jane Adventures, as well as regular mentions in the standard editions of Doctor Who Magazine.

Title	Publisher	Release date
The Sarah Jane Adventures: Quiz Book	Penguin Character Books Ltd	5 November 2009
Impossible Worlds, Impossible Things: Cultural Perspectives on Doctor Who, Torchwood and the Sarah Jane Adventures	Cambridge Scholars Publishing	1 May 2010

=== Home media ===
==== DVD ====
Release name	Region 2	Region 4	Region 1	Notes/extras
Invasion of the Bane	29 October 2007	12 January 2009; Re-released 2 March 2010	Not released individually	Elisabeth Sladen interview, Blue Peter Visits The Set, CBBC trailers, interactive Sarah Jane biography with Doctor Who clips, Character And Alien Profiles, behind the scenes Photo Gallery.
The Complete First Series; Also includes "Invasion of the Bane"	10 November 2008	4 June 2009; Re-released 5 January 2010	7 October 2008	Interviews, Blue Peter Set Visit, CBBC trailers, outtakes (accessed via a quiz), Characters, Tools and Aliens Profiles, behind the scenes Photo Gallery.
The Complete Second Series	9 November 2009	3 June 2010; Re-released 2 March 2011	10 November 2009	From Raxacoricofallapatorious with Love (accessed via a quiz), Me & My Movie with Tommy Knight (behind the scenes clips), CBBC trailers, Character, Tools & Alien profiles, Photo galleries.
The Complete Third Series	1 November 2010	2 March 2011; Re-released 2 June 2011	4 January 2011	No Blu-ray release despite being filmed in HD.
The Complete Fourth Series	31 October 2011	1 March 2012	6 December 2011	UK release includes Pyramids of Mars as a bonus feature in tribute to Elisabeth Sladen.
The Fifth Series	6 February 2012	5 July 2012	12 June 2012	Includes the documentary Goodbye Bannerman Road: Remembering Elisabeth Sladen.
The Complete Series 1–5	6 February 2012	Not Released	Not Released	Includes all of the features that are included in Series 1, 2, 3, 4 and 5 boxsets.
Doctor Who: The Green Death (Special Edition)	5 August 2013	7 August 2013	13 August 2013	The Special Edition release of this Doctor Who serial contains The Sarah Jane Adventures story Death of the Doctor as a bonus feature with commentary by creator Russell T. Davies and actress Katy Manning.
The Attic: Sarah Jane Adventures 10th Anniversary Reunion	29 July 2017 Region Free	Not released	Not released	Released for charity as part of the 10th Anniversary to help raise money for Ty Hafan Children's Hospice. The set includes footage from the day, guest panels, interviews, behind the scenes of the event and bonus features.

==== Blu-ray ====
Release name	UK release date (region B)	Australian release date (region B)	North American release date (region A)	Notes/extras
The Complete Fourth Series	31 October 2011; Region Free	Not released	Not released	UK release includes Pyramids of Mars as a bonus feature in tribute to Elisabeth Sladen (in Standard Definition)
The Fifth Series	6 February 2012; Region Free	Not released	Not released	Includes the documentary Goodbye Bannerman Road: Remembering Elisabeth Sladen.
The Attic: Sarah Jane Adventures 10th Anniversary Reunion	29 July 2017 Region Free	Not released	Not released	Released for charity as part of the 10th Anniversary to help raise money for Tŷ Hafan Children's Hospice. The set includes footage from the day, guest panels, interviews, behind the scenes of the event and bonus features.
Doctor Who: The Collection: Season 10	8 July 2019	13 November 2019	15 October 2019	Includes Death of the Doctor as a bonus feature with commentary by creator Russell T. Davies and actress Katy Manning.
Doctor Who: The Complete David Tennant Collection	Not released	Not released	17 September 2019	Includes The Wedding of Sarah Jane Smith as a bonus feature.
Doctor Who: The Specials (steelbook)	21 October 2019	Not released	Not released	Includes The Wedding of Sarah Jane Smith as a bonus feature.

== Sarah Jane's Alien Files ==
Sarah Jane's Alien Files
- Title Card
- Created by: Russell T Davies
- Starring: Elisabeth Sladen; Tommy Knight; Daniel Anthony; Anjli Mohindra
- Voices of: Alexander Armstrong
- Theme music composer: Murray Gold
- Composer: Sam Watts
- Country of origin: United Kingdom
- Original language: English
- No. of series: 1
- No. of episodes: 6 (list of episodes)

Production
- Executive producer: Gillian Scothern
- Producer: John Piper
- Running time: 30 min

Original release
- Network: CBBC
- Release: 11 October – 15 November 2010

Sarah Jane's Alien Files is a BBC series based on The Sarah Jane Adventures. It features the characters Sarah Jane Smith, Luke Smith, Clyde Langer and Rani Chandra entering data on aliens they have encountered during their adventures into Mr Smith, Sarah Jane's extraterrestrial computer, to benefit humanity in the event that Sarah Jane is no longer capable of defending the Earth against alien threats.

Each episode is a clip show summarising the events of episodes in which the featured aliens appeared. The only new footage is the framing and narration, shot entirely on the series' standing attic set. Occasionally, brief clips from Doctor Who are included for context, such as in Episode 6 when the Judoon are compared to the Cheetah People of Survival in that each humanoid species looks superficially like a non-humanoid terrestrial mammal (rhinoceros and cheetah, respectively). The series format was based upon the short "alien files" clips previously produced for the CBBC's The Sarah Jane Adventures website.

The series is similar to the Doctor Who spin-off Monster Files.
