= The Wedding of Sarah Jane Smith =

2009 Sarah Jane Adventures story

15 – The Wedding of Sarah Jane Smith
- The Sarah Jane Adventures story

Cast
- Starring: Elisabeth Sladen – Sarah Jane Smith; Tommy Knight – Luke Smith; Daniel Anthony – Clyde Langer; Anjli Mohindra – Rani Chandra; Alexander Armstrong – Mr Smith; John Leeson – Voice of K9
- Others: David Tennant – The Doctor; Nigel Havers – Peter Dalton; Mina Anwar – Gita Chandra; Ace Bhatti – Haresh Chandra; Paul Marc Davis – Trickster; Zienia Merton – Registrar

Production
- Directed by: Joss Agnew
- Written by: Gareth Roberts
- Script editor: Gary Russell
- Produced by: Nikki Wilson; Phil Ford (co-producer)
- Executive producers: Russell T Davies; Julie Gardner; Piers Wenger
- Music by: Sam Watts; Dan Watts
- Production code: 3.5 and 3.6
- Series: Series 3
- Running time: 2 episodes, 28 minutes each
- First broadcast: 29 October 2009
- Last broadcast: 30 October 2009

Chronology
| ← Preceded by The Mad Woman in the Attic | Followed by → The Eternity Trap |

The Wedding of Sarah Jane Smith is the third serial of the third series of the British science fiction television series The Sarah Jane Adventures. The two-part story was first broadcast on BBC One on 29 and 30 October 2009. It guest stars David Tennant as the Tenth Doctor, marking the first appearance of parent programme Doctor Who's main character in a spin-off show. The episode includes the final scenes David Tennant recorded during his first tenure as the Doctor.

In the story, alien investigator Sarah Jane Smith gets engaged to her boyfriend, Peter Dalton. However, alien time traveller and old friend of Sarah Jane's, the Doctor, raises an objection at her wedding, and the marriage is revealed to be a malicious plot set up by Sarah Jane's arch nemesis, the Trickster.

== Plot ==
Peter Dalton, a servant of the Trickster, proposes to Sarah Jane. When Sarah Jane puts the engagement ring on it glows red and begins influencing her. At a countryside hotel two weeks later, the Tenth Doctor bursts through the doors, demanding the wedding be stopped. As he warns Sarah Jane to step away from Peter, the Trickster appears and kidnaps Sarah Jane.

As Luke, Clyde, and Rani regain consciousness, the Doctor introduces himself, swiftly revealing that they and K9 are the only people in the hotel; the Trickster has trapped them in a looping second, cutting them off from the rest of the world, and the TARDIS. The Doctor determines that Sarah Jane is trapped in another second, deducing that the Trickster has separated the group to prevent them helping Sarah Jane.

Peter is in a state where he is only half-alive. At the moment of his death, the Trickster offered him to be restored to life after he married Sarah Jane. The Trickster is holding Sarah Jane's friends hostage in a second, and time will only resume if she says "I do", after which she will forget her old life of defending Earth, creating more chaos for the Trickster to feed on.

The Doctor enters the TARDIS, with the hopes of using its artron energy to fight the Trickster. However, it departs before Luke, Clyde, and Rani can enter. Clyde's attempt to enter the TARDIS results in him becoming charged with artron energy, allowing him to attack the Trickster. With the Trickster's power momentarily disrupted by Clyde's attack, the Doctor is able to arrive in Sarah Jane's second, telling her that there is only one way to end the Trickster's deal. Sarah Jane informs Peter that the only way to stop the Trickster is for Peter to take back the deal, even though this will mean his death. Strengthened by his love for Sarah Jane, Peter ends the deal, returning the hotel to the moment before the Doctor's arrival. With Peter having vanished, Sarah Jane cancels the wedding. Returning to Sarah Jane's attic in the TARDIS, the Doctor says goodbye to Sarah Jane and her friends.

== Cast notes ==
Zienia Merton had previously appeared as Ping Cho in the Doctor Who serial Marco Polo in 1964. Nigel Havers had previously played Nick in the Eighth Doctor audio drama No More Lies.

In the story, Clyde states that Brigadier Lethbridge-Stewart is "back in Peru". It had been intended by the production team that Lethbridge-Stewart would appear in the story and meet the Tenth Doctor, but actor Nicholas Courtney was recovering from a stroke and unable to take part.

This serial was the final regular episode that David Tennant filmed as the Tenth Doctor, as he had already finished filming The End of Time (his final chronological episode of Doctor Who) before production began on the serial. He would later reprise the role in the 50th anniversary special in 2013, and played the Fourteenth Doctor in the 60th anniversary specials in late 2023.

== Novelisation ==
The Wedding of Sarah Jane Smith
- Author: Gareth Roberts
- Series: The Sarah Jane Adventures #9
- Published: 5 November 2009; Penguin Books
- Pages: 128
- ISBN: 1-405-90628-6
- Preceded by: The Day of the Clown
- Followed by: The Nightmare Man

This was the ninth of eleven Sarah Jane Adventures serials to be adapted as a novel. Written by Gareth Roberts, the book was first published in paperback on 5 November 2009.
