= Guess with Jess =

British children's television series

- Genre: Children's; Animation; Educational
- Based on: Jess the Cat from Postman Pat by: John Cunliffe
- Written by: Tim Hastings; Lane Leuras; Gene Grillo
- Directed by: Mike Shiell
- Creative director: Donald Anderson
- Voices of: Charlie George; Morwenna Banks; Jo Wyatt; Bailey Pepper; Beth Chalmers; Daniel Anthony; Kyle Stanger; Sian Taylor
- Theme music composer: Jonathan Evans
- Opening theme: "Guess With Jess"
- Ending theme: Various
- Composer: Julian Nott
- Countries of origin: United Kingdom; Canada
- Original language: English
- No. of seasons: 2
- No. of episodes: 52

Production
- Executive producers: Mandy Kamester; Doug Murphy; Chris Rose; Scott Dyer; Jane Smith; Heather McGillivray
- Producers: Ceri Barnes; Annika Bluhm; Tracey Dodokin; Jocelyn Hamilton
- Editor: Alan Simpson
- Running time: 10 minutes
- Production companies: Entertainment Rights (Earlier Season 1 episodes); Classic Media (Later Season 1 episodes and Season 2) (Note: As Guess with Jess Limited); Nelvana (Note: As Refrain Productions. Animation production by Pipeline Studios and Guru Studio.)

Original release
- Network: CBeebies (United Kingdom); Treehouse TV (Canada)
- Release: 9 November 2009 – 7 March 2010

Related
- Postman Pat

Guess with Jess is an interactive animated children's television series featuring Jess the Cat from the television series Postman Pat. The series follows the adventures of a black-and-white cat named Jess who lives with his friends on a farm and how they always try to solve each other's problems with a Big Question, which is answered by "asking, testing, find a way". Jess and his friends search for the answers to science and nature-based questions, allowing children to learn about the world around them. 52 episodes were produced.

Unlike his appearance in Postman Pat, Jess in this series has the ability to talk to his friends on the farm.

New episodes of the series originally aired on the DreamWorks Channel in Thailand until 2020.

== Characters ==
- Jess (voiced by Charlie George) is the titular protagonist and host of the series. He is a young, curious black and white cat with green eyes, from the CBeebies series Postman Pat.
- Willow (voiced by Morwenna Banks) is a skewbald horse wearing a sunhat and is the largest of all the characters, she acts as a wise mother figure to Jess. Willow shares the stable with the puppies, Joey and Jinx.
- Mimi (voiced by Jo Wyatt) is a pink rabbit and Jess' best friend who lives in a hutch around the farmyard garden. Mimi has an affinity with arts and crafts and she enjoys making anything colourful or unique.
- Baa (voiced by Bailey Pepper) is a sheep with a blue beanie and a blue and white scarf. He always hangs out with Billie, who both live up in buttercup meadow. Baa tends to be afraid of more things than the others and particularly hates getting wet because the water stays in his wool a long time, making him cold and miserable and also makes his wool heavy.
- Billie (voiced by Beth Chalmers) is a field mouse and is the smallest of all the characters. She is often seen with Baa and rides around on his hat, since Baa can get places faster than she can. She carries a magnifying glass and a set of binoculars so she can investigate the "big question" further.
- Horace (voiced by Daniel Anthony) is a frog who lives at the pond. He loves making music and instruments out of natural found objects.
- Joey (voiced by Kyle Stanger) and Jinx (voiced by Sian Taylor) are two twin puppy siblings. Joey (the male) wears a blue collar with a bone shaped dog tag and Jinx (the female) wears a pink collar with a flower shaped dog tag and a flower in her hair. They both love to run about the farm, rolling about in the mud and jumping over puddles.
- A host of minor characters – such as Sammy Snail, Brown Bird, Kevin the fish, etc.

== Episodes ==
=== Season 1 ===
1. How Can We Make a Boat?
2. How Can We All Keep Warm?
3. What's Happened To Chloe The Caterpillar?
4. When Will My Coloured Stripes Come Back?
5. Who Did I Hear In The Big Hollow Log?
6. What Can We Do With Mimi's Rubbish?
7. Who Wants To Live In Baa's Meadow?
8. Why Are The Ants Visiting Mimi?
9. Why Do Spiders Build Webs?
10. How Can We Bring The Outside Inside?
11. What's My Favourite Thing About Spring?
12. How Can I Hide Without Being Found?
13. Why Do Bees Make Honey?
14. When Will The Owl Go Hooooo!?
15. Where's My Puddle Gone?
16. Why Has My Shadow Gone Away?
17. When Will The Water Come Back?
18. How Can We Paint The Lilly Pad Green?
19. Where's My Feather Gone?
20. Where Have All The Stars Gone?
21. How Can We Make Music For Mimi?
22. How Can We Find Sammy Snail?
23. Why Won't My Kite Fly?
24. How Did A Dandelion Seed Get Into Mimi's Garden?
25. What's The Grumbly Rumbly Noise?
26. When Will The Snow Come?

=== Season 2 ===
1. What Do We Need To Grow Beans?
2. Why Is Hedgehog Curled Up In a Ball?
3. How Can We Make The Most Beautiful Garden Ever?
4. Why Are There Little Hills In The Orchard?
5. Why Are There So Many Ladybirds?
6. How Can I Stop Little Bird Eating The Seeds?
7. How Can I Go Up And Down On The See-Saw?
8. What Can I Do With My Nature Collection?
9. How Can I Make My Peach Soft?
10. How Can We Help Billy Stay Warm?
11. How Can We Hide To Watch Butterflies?
12. How Can I Go Faster Than Joey And Jinx?
13. What Shall We Have For Our Harvest Breakfast?
14. What Hat Should Mimi Wear?
15. What's Happened To My Little Tree?
16. How Can We All Keep Cool?
17. What's The Funny Little Creature In The Pond?
18. How Can We Keep Dry For Horace's Concert?
19. How Can I Make Kevin The Carp Happy In His Pond?
20. How Can We Decorate The Christmas Tree?
21. How Can I Make The Trolley Go Faster?
22. How Can We Mend Baa's Trough?
23. What's That Green Hairy Stuff?
24. How Can I Find My Friends?
25. Why Are Acorns Buried Under The Tree?
26. How Can I Sound Like The Brown Bird?

== Development ==
A Jess-centric spin-off to Postman Pat was put into development at Entertainment Rights in 2004. After reporting a 172% rise in pre-tax profits for 2005, the company announced in March 2006 that the BBC had commissioned the spin-off as a full series, with a 2008 delivery window. The company revealed that the series would be computer-animated, and make use of state-of-the-art fur technology developed by Pixar Animation Studios.

At MIPCOM 2008, it was announced that the series would premiere in 2009.

=== Broadcast ===
In February 2010, Classic Media revealed that the series had been pre-sold in over 25 territories worldwide.

In February 2012, Classic Media pre-sold the series in New Zealand, South Korea, Thailand and China. In March, the series was pre-sold to Qubo in the United States, and later expanded with deals for Hungary, Russia, Turkey, Kazakhstan and the Middle East.

== Licensing and Merchandise ==
Following the announcement of the series in March 2006, Fisher-Price was appointed by Entertainment Rights as the series' master toy partner, except in North America and Japan. The company said that a larger consumer products programme would be revealed in 2008.

In September 2010, Classic Media revealed its consumer products program for the series in Canada, signing deals with Fisher-Price for toys, Nelvana Enterprises for home media, and a licensing deal with The Licensing Shop.

In July 2011, P2 Games signed a deal with Classic Media to produce apps based on their preschool properties, including Guess with Jess.
