= Maya and Meena =

Dragon Quest characters

- Dragon Quest characters
- Maya (right) and Meena (left) in Dragon Quest IV
- First game: Dragon Quest IV (1990)
- Created by: Yuji Horii
- Designed by: Akira Toriyama
- Voiced by: Japanese: Miyuki Sawashiro (Maya) Yoko Hikasa (Meena); English: Anjli Mohindra (Maya) Mariam Haque (Meena)

Maya and Meena (Note: Japanese: マーニャ, Mānya, and ミネア, Minea) are two fictional characters in the 1990 video game Dragon Quest IV. Maya is a dancer and Meena a fortune teller. The two are sisters who set out on a journey to avenge their father's murder. They appear as the lead characters of the fourth chapter, and join the Hero in the fifth chapter to defeat the monster Psaro. They were created by Yuji Horii and designed by Akira Toriyama, and have been the subject of praise for both their designs and concepts, particularly Meena's use of tarot cards as weapons and Maya's beauty. The music played for the pair has also received praise, with critics identifying folk music and Middle Eastern music inspirations for their theme.

The pair were localized under the names Mara and Nara in the 1992 English release of Dragon Warrior IV, and as Maya and Meena starting with the 2008 English localization of the Nintendo DS remake of Dragon Quest IV.

== Appearances ==
Maya and Meena appear in the video game Dragon Quest IV, first appearing as the lead characters of the fourth chapter. They are working in the town Laissez Fayre (Monbaraba), a town for entertainers and tourists, with Maya being a dancer and Meena a fortune teller. They work these jobs as a cover to investigate the murder of their father, trying to find the whereabouts of his killer Balzack. Their father had been developing an amazing discovery, the Secret of Evolution, but Balzack killed him and stole the incomplete work from him. They join with another of their father's apprentices, Oojam (Orin), and eventually find and defeat Balzack at the castle of Léon (Keeleon). Afterward, Balzack's master, Marquis de Leon, defeats the group, arresting them. They manage to escape, but the guards catch them; Oojam gives his life to allow the sisters to escape to Endor.

In the fifth chapter, they are found in Endor, stranded due to Maya spending all their money gambling. Meena's fortune-telling recognizes that the Hero is the one with the power to save the world. She and Maya join the party, the first members of the Hero's team to join the battle against Psaro. Later in Chapter 5, they confront Balzack once again, who has used an imperfect version of the Secret of Evolution to transform into a new monstrous form. They successfully manage to avenge their father's death by killing him.

== Concept and creation ==
Maya and Meena were both created by the game's creator, Yuji Horii, and designed by the game's artist, Akira Toriyama. Horii decided to change up the player's expected structure of the fifth chapter by having the characters join the Hero's party in reverse order of the earlier chapters, meaning the sisters were set to be the first to join the Hero. In Dragon Quest Monsters: The Dark Prince, Maya appears wearing an outfit that covers up more of her skin, wearing spats and innerwear under her normal outfit. Maya's design was changed to include spats as part of a statue featured in Dragon Quest Treasures. The characters Veronica and Serena from Dragon Quest XI were inspired by Maya and Meena, with the staff wanting to include a "strong female duo" like Maya and Meena.

== Reception ==
Maya and Meena have received generally positive reception, with fans debating over who is the most attractive in the game among them and Alena, with Maidona News writer Makoto Umikawa saying that Maya was among the sexiest characters in Dragon Quest. A writer for Dengeki Online recounted their enjoyment of quiet characters like Meena, which lead to them getting into tarot cards. They found the end of their chapter sad, feeling more able to appreciate the scene now than when they were younger. 4gamer writer Kenichi Maeyamada expressed excitement with the addition of Maya and Meena to Dragon Quest Heroes and its sequel, expressing how much of a fan he was of Meena since he was young. He expressed his curiosity about how her tarot carts worked in combat, excited to see them in action in Dragon Quest Heroes II. RPGFan writer Patrick Gann expressed that their chapter was a highlight of the story for him due to multiple moments, including Maya performing a puff-puff and them fighting against "seemingly-impossible odds."

IT Media writer Tetsuya Amano considered Maya and Meena two of his favorite characters in Dragon Quest IV. Magmix writer Seiichiro Hayakawa expressed how excited he was as a child to have encountered Maya and Meena, recounting how exciting they were due to their attractive designs. Fellow Magmix writer Kazuaki Ishida considered Maya his favorite character in Dragon Quest, praising her for being sexy while having a rough personality. Inside Games staff speculated that Maya's design change featured in The Dark Prince was caused by the Computer Entertainment Rating Organization rating of B, arguing that Super Smash Bros. Ultimate, which was also rated B, kept out the character Mai Shiranui due to her sexual design. They noted a negative reaction to this change on social media.

Their battle theme, "Gypsy Dance", has received positive reception from critics and fans, with Futabanet writer Yamaguchi Quest noting that some players made Maya or Meena the lead so they could hear this theme. Dengeki Online staff also praised the battle theme, and also admired the overworld theme, "Gypsy's Journey". They wrote that the beginning of the theme conveyed loneliness and then transitioned into a Middle Eastern mood, with the main theme bearing both sadness and intensity that fit the sisters' quest for revenge. They felt that the chorus was passionate, matching the feel of Maya and Meena. They also appreciated that both characters got their own theme. Magmix writer Luis Field praised the song for being memorable, saying that it reminds him of folk music, as well as claiming it symbolizes both chapter 4 and the game as a whole. Yamaguchi Quest called their theme a masterpiece, feeling it demonstrated the sisters' individuality. He felt that it was an evocative song, able to make players feel the heat of the sisters' plot for revenge. He also felt it was evocative of Maya herself.
