= Tŷ Hafan =

Welsh palliative care charity

- Formation: 1999
- Headquarters: Sully
- Region served: Wales
- Chief Executive: Irfon Rees
- Chair of the Board: Martin Davies
- Website: www.tyhafan.org

Tŷ Hafan is a Welsh registered charity that provides holistic palliative care for children with life-limiting conditions and their families from throughout Wales. A wide range of care and support is offered at the hospice, based in the Vale of Glamorgan in south Wales, in the community, at hospital or in schools.

On 14 October 2014, the Welsh charity hosted its first Research and Innovation Conference, in partnership with Cardiff University, at The Vale Resort. The event provided a showcase for the research and innovation projects of healthcare professionals and academics working in paediatric palliative care.

== History ==
In 1988 Suzanne Goodall, a newly retired occupational therapist from Beddau in south Wales, felt compelled to bring a children's hospice to Wales and registered Tŷ Hafan as a charity in 1990. In 1993, the site for the hospice building was acquired from Llandough NHS Hospital. The next few years saw huge support from the likes of the South Wales Echo, who launched an appeal, and Diana, Princess of Wales, who became the first patron of the Welsh charity.

In 1995, on request from Diana, Luciano Pavarotti performed a concert in Cardiff Castle to raise money for the charity. The building of the hospice started in 1996, and the completed building was handed over to Tŷ Hafan for fitting and equipping in 1997. After much hard work and with the kindness and generosity of the public, Tŷ Hafan opened its doors for the first time in 1999.

In 2004, the Queen acknowledged Suzanne's achievement by investing her as an MBE in the New Year's Honours List.

Beautiful Lives, a four-part BBC One documentary series aired in 2011, followed the lives of the children, families and staff of Tŷ Hafan. A follow-up episode focusing on Catherine and Kirsty, teenage twins who use Tŷ Hafan's services, aired in 2012.

== Events ==
Tŷ Hafan hosts a series of annual fundraising events, including the Welsh Three Peaks, the Rainbow Run and the Taff Trail Cycle Challenge.

== Patrons and celebrity ambassadors ==
Diana, Princess of Wales was the first patron of the charity. Charles, Prince of Wales (later King Charles III) became patron in 2001. Catherine, Princess of Wales became patron in 2025.

Celebrity ambassadors have included the actor Michael Sheen, the Welsh rugby player Leigh Halfpenny and the television presenters and journalists Rhodri and Lucy Owen.

== Crackerjackpot hospice lottery ==
Crackerjackpot Lottery in support of Tŷ Hafan, is the largest hospice lottery in the UK.

The weekly top prize is £2,000, with a rollover jackpot of £12,000.

== Publications and reports ==
Tŷ Hafan produces a variety of publications, including Insight, a bi-annual academic journal that aims to share best practice in children's palliative care, and their Annual Review, which outlines key achievements and offers an overview of the different aspects of the service Tŷ Hafan provides.

An inspection report by Health Inspectorate Wales was conducted in March 2012.
