= CBBC =

British free-to-air children's television channel and brand (launched 1985)

- Logo used since 2023
- Country: United Kingdom
- Broadcast area: United Kingdom; Isle of Man; Channel Islands
- Network: BBC One (until 2012); BBC Two (until 2013, revived in 2017 and 2022); BBC Alba (in Scottish Gaelic only)
- Headquarters: MediaCityUK, Salford, England

Programming
- Language: English
- Picture format: 1080i/1080p (Note: 1080p25 sometimes only on Freeview) HDTV (downscaled to 576i for the SDTV feed)

Ownership
- Owner: BBC
- Sister channels: BBC One; BBC Two; BBC Three; BBC Four; BBC News; BBC Parliament; CBeebies; BBC Scotland; BBC Alba

History
- Launched: 9 September 1985; 41 years ago (block, as Children's BBC); 11 February 2002; 24 years ago (channel)

Links
- Website: bbc.co.uk/cbbc (UK only)

Availability

Terrestrial
- Freeview: Channel 201 (SD); Channel 203 (HD)

Streaming media
- BBC iPlayer: Watch live (UK only)
- Virgin TV Anywhere: Watch live (Ireland only)
- UPC TV: Watch live (Switzerland only)

CBBC (short for Children's BBC) is a British free-to-air public broadcast children's television channel owned and operated by the BBC. It is also the brand used for all BBC content for children aged from 6 to 12. Its sister channel, CBeebies, is aimed at children aged 6 and under. It broadcasts every day from 7:00 am to 7:00 pm, timesharing with BBC Three.

== History ==
The CBBC channel launched on 11 February 2002, along with its sister channel, CBeebies. The CBBC name (shortened for Children's BBC) had been used starting in 1997, as the branding for all content on BBC One and BBC Two aimed at children. It continued to regularly air on these channels until regular weekday broadcasting was discontinued in December 2012, but the branding continues to be used occasionally on these channels.

Prior to the channels' launch, there were CBBC blocks on other cable and satellite stations. From 1996 to 1999, CBBC programming aired on Nickelodeon as a block called CBBC on Nickelodeon, and on BBC Choice (now BBC Three), exclusive programmes aired as CBBC Choice between 1998 and 1999, and airing reruns during daytime hours as CBBC on Choice from 1999 to 2002.

CBBC was named the Channel of the Year at the British Academy Children's Awards in 2008, 2012, and 2015. The channel averages 300,000 viewers per day.

The channel broadcast from 7:00 am to 7:00 pm, seven days a week, timesharing with BBC Choice from its launch until 8 February 2003. From 9 February 2003, the channel timeshares with BBC Three, which replaced BBC Choice. On 22 August 2008, it was announced that the channel would be available live on its website from 16 September. CBBC's reach further expanded with the addition of the channel on Sky in Ireland on 12 May 2011. The British Forces Broadcasting Service (BFBS) have provided viewers with CBBC and CBeebies since 1 April 2013, when they replaced BFBS Kids.

In August 2007, the BBC announced a rebrand for CBBC, aimed more at an older audience to appeal more to its target audience and to better compete with other channels targeting the demographic such as Nickelodeon and Disney Channel.

In November 2015, as a further aspect of the Delivering Quality First plan that resulted in the replacement of BBC Three with a branded digital presence, the BBC Trust approved a proposal for CBBC to extend its broadcast day by two hours until 9:00pm, using bandwidth previously reserved for BBC Three. The two hours were aimed towards an older youth/teenage audience. The extended timeslot was in effect from 11 April 2016 until 4 January 2022.

On 14 March 2016, CBBC unveiled a new logo and on-air presentation, featuring an abstract, multicoloured wordmark enclosed in a box. CBBC controller Cheryl Taylor stated that the new brand was designed to be "fun and unpredictable" and would "appeal to both ends of our broad age spectrum". The logo was also meant to be suitable for use across digital platforms.

On 2 March 2021, with the relaunch of BBC Three as a broadcast channel in January 2022, it was announced that CBBC's broadcast hours would be reduced by two hours. Starting on 5 January 2022, the channel reverted to ending at 7:00pm and timeshare with BBC Three, as was the case before the 2016 relaunch.

On 15 March 2023, CBBC rebranded its on-screen bug and identity to match the BBC's 2021 logo, replacing the 2016 logo which had been used for seven years.

In October 2026, it was reported that BBC executives discussed merging the channel with its sister channel, CBeebies, but this was ultimately dismissed, as it was described as "too politically dangerous", following concerns about doubts about their commitment to children's public service broacdasting.

=== Proposed closure of the channel ===
On 26 May 2022, the BBC announced plans for CBBC, BBC Four and BBC Radio 4 Extra to be discontinued as linear services and switch to online-only services as part of cutbacks and other changes focusing on creating a "digital-first" BBC, adding that they would remain on air for "at least the next three years". Under the plan, CBBC would exclusively operate as a content hub on iPlayer, as BBC Three had done before it was relaunched in early 2022. However, in December 2024, it was announced the closure had been reprieved. Patricia Hidalgo, director of BBC Children's and Education, told The i Paper "the numbers don't tell us you have to close it yet" and "it's really important to us as public service broadcasters that if children still need us on a linear network, we're going to be there for them".

== Management ==
Along with CBeebies, CBBC is operated by the BBC Children's and Education department. BBC Children's was originally based in the East Tower of BBC Television Centre following the department's inception, but moved to MediaCityUK in Salford in September 2011, and the live presentation links used throughout the day have been recorded and broadcast from there since then.

== Programming ==
The remit of CBBC is to provide a wide range of high quality, distinctive content for 6–12 year olds, including drama, entertainment, comedy, animation, news, and factual. The great majority of this content should be produced in the UK. CBBC should provide a stimulating, creative, and enjoyable environment that is also safe and trusted. The service should have a particular focus on informal learning, with an emphasis on encouraging participation.

— 2016 CBBC Remit

CBBC uses a programming output similar to the block previously shown on BBC One. CBBC often complements this block with programmes shown earlier than on the terrestrial channels, reruns, or whole series shown in a day, alongside other exclusive commissions.

CBBC has also broadcast a series of skits and games in-between programmes (except Newsround), in their dedicated studio "CBBC HQ". It usually mentions BBC iPlayer and participation from their audience.

=== Most viewed programmes ===
This section lists the ten most watched shows on CBBC, based on Live +7 data supplied by BARB.

Rank	Series	Episode	Date	Viewers
1	The Sarah Jane Adventures	"The Wedding of Sarah Jane Smith (Part 2)"	3 October 2009	1,090,000
2	The Sarah Jane Adventures	"Lost in Time (Part 1)"	8 November 2010	1,000,000
3	The Sarah Jane Adventures	"Death of the Doctor (Part 2)"	26 October 2010	960,000
4	The Sarah Jane Adventures	"Death of the Doctor (Part 1)"	25 October 2010	920,000
5	My Mum Tracy Beaker	"The Person I Most Admire"	12 February 2021	883,000
6	Tracy Beaker Returns	"Shadows"	13 January 2012	875,000
7	Tracy Beaker Returns	"Slow Burn"	6 January 2012	856,000
7	Tracy Beaker Returns	"Big Brother"	20 January 2012	856,000
9	My Sarah Jane	"A Tribute to Elisabeth Sladen"	23 April 2011	830,000
10	Tracy Beaker Returns	"Full Circle"	8 January 2010	826,000

=== Educational programming ===
As part of CBBC's original remit, CBBC was required to show 1,000 hours of factual and schools programmes per year. The channel managed this by airing Class TV, which would air educational programming for four hours each day in the morning, with normal programming resuming in the early afternoon. Much of this programming was older BBC Schools programming shown, in some cases, decades before and which was for the most part still relevant. Few school programmes were commissioned for the channel. Class TV ended in March 2008, following a change to CBBC's remit. However, in December 2019, CBBC revived the format with "Live Lessons" presented by the CBBC presenting team on weekday mornings.

During the COVID-19 pandemic and the closure of schools around the country, CBBC broadcast educational programming for primary school children. This included a mixture of programmes which were new or had previously aired on CBBC, with a focus on learning as well as newly recorded content. This was done to help children without the financial means to participate in lessons over the internet.

== Presentation ==
CBBC has featured a relatively similar presentation to that of its strand counterpart. The logo consistently remained the same as the service until 2016; green coloured blobs from its launch until September 2007, and the green and white logo used from September 2007 to March 2016. The logo used from March 2016 to March 2023 is multicoloured unlike its predecessor. The current logo returned to being fully green. CBBC has mainly utilised presenters from the main service, with a few presenters appearing mostly on the channel; Gemma Hunt and Anne Foy being notable examples and appearing consistently until August 2007. At the beginning of September 2007, along with the relaunch, the same presenters of CBBC would also feature on CBBC on BBC One and Two.

When CBBC launched, presentation was located in TC2 at BBC Television Centre, where the channel shared studio facilities with CBBC's original magazine show Xchange. This changed in 2004, when CBBC moved to TC9, with the CBBC links moving to TC10; however, this was changed in March 2006, with all CBBC and CBBC channel links were located in TC9. A further change was scheduled to occur in December 2006, when all output moved to a chroma key set within TC12, and was presented by only one presenter. This short live decision lasted until the relaunch in 2007, which involved a new "office" set being constructed, initially in TC12 and later in a new studio facility in the East Tower of Television Centre.

In 2011, CBBC moved into studio HQ5 at Dock10 studios in MediaCityUK. Presentation originated from HQ5 from September 2011 to December 2023. The office was redesigned several times, two in 2015, the first one being a minor change with the launch of the Go CBBC app, and another one in May which entirely changed some of the structure, adding a post chute and an Up Next screen, one in 2016 due to CBBC's rebrand, gaining a smaller desk, an extra Up Next screen, and being renamed as CBBC HQ, and one in 2023, following CBBC's rebrand, in which the logo, the desk, and the studio's color scheme were updated.

CBBC left HQ5 in December 2023 for undisclosed reasons. Presentations were filmed using Chroma key for the first time since 2007 until September 2025, when the CBBC Channel was given a new HQ.

== Other services ==
=== CBBC Extra ===
CBBC Extra was a free interactive television service from CBBC provided by the BBC Red Button. It was accessible from CBBC by pressing red and then selecting CBBC Extra from the main menu. It could also be accessed from any other BBC channel by pressing red and going to page number 570. The service differed across digital platforms, for example, Sky viewers could access a video loop. After a brief stint with a temporary producer, the channel began to succeed in popularity under producer and director Brendan Sheppard. After Sheppard had finished work on Nelly Nut Live, he was appointed by CBBC controller Gary August to work on CBBC Extra, and under Sheppard, the service received a rebrand, idents, graphics, and it introduced feature items such as Ask Aaron and a Halloween special with Basil Brush. There was a Doctor Who special with sequences featuring K9 that was deleted from broadcast, and a documentary series called Really Living It!. Sheppard was then hired to direct DinoSapien in Canada, and a new producer was appointed after Sheppard left to work on Doctor Who. Its availability on Freeview was dependent if BBC Red Button did not show other interactive services, such as major sports events coverage. The service offered numerous features including Newsround, horoscopes, Chris/Dodge's blog, viewer content, jokes, and other interactive elements.

From 2013 to 2016, CBBC Extra was available on the CBBC website, until the service was discontinued in May 2016.

=== CBBC Online ===
The CBBC website provides a wide range of activities for viewers aged 6 to 12, such as games, videos, puzzles, printable pages, pre-moderated message boards, and frequently updated news feeds. It contains pages for the majority of its current programming with various content on each. There are also micro-sites from Newsround and MOTD Kickabout, providing children with news and sport, as well as the CBBC on BBC iPlayer that features recent CBBC programmes available for 30 days after it aired on the channel.

=== CBBC HD ===
CBBC HD logo (2013–2016)

In July 2013, BBC announced that CBBC HD would be launched by early 2014, however, it launched on 10 December 2013. CBBC HD broadcasts on the BBC's HD multiplex on Freeview and shares its bandwidth with BBC Three HD as they air at different times. (Note: in England and Northern Ireland; in Wales it shares with S4C HD and in Scotland it shares with BBC Scotland HD)

Before launch, the majority of CBBC HD output was broadcast on BBC HD before its closure in March 2013. CBBC HD was added to the Sky EPG in Ireland in 2017.

From July to August 2014, CBBC HD was temporarily removed from Freeview during the 2014 Commonwealth Games so that BBC Three and BBC Three HD could broadcast 24 hours a day, similar to when BBC Parliament was temporarily removed during the 2008 Summer Olympics and 2012 Summer Olympics.

From March to April 2018, BBC Red Button HD broadcast from 9 pm to 5:30 am during CBBC's off-air hours on Sky and Freeview. After the close, CBBC HD reverted to broadcasting 24 hours a day.

Since the launch of BBC Scotland, CBBC HD began to go off-air at 19:00 in Scotland on Freeview, due to the channel timesharing with BBC Scotland HD, which starts at 19:00, however, CBBC SD continued to end at 21:00 in Scotland until hours were reduced nationwide in January 2022.

Since January 2022, CBBC HD on Freeview in Wales closes at 2 pm on weekends, to allow bandwidth for S4C HD.

=== CBBC Alba ===
In September 2018, as part of a branding strategy, the unbranded two-hour children's block on BBC Alba was split into CBeebies Alba and CBBC Alba, with the former airing during the first hour and the latter airing during the second hour. This block features its own presentation, presenters, and shows, all dubbed into Scottish Gaelic.

Previously, a similar block called Children's BBC Scotland was aired in the Scottish school holidays on BBC One Scotland and BBC Two Scotland throughout the 1990s, where the block (similar to CBeebies Alba and CBBC Alba) featured its own presentation and presenters (as an opt out from the network) linking into various shows airing on BBC Scotland's regional versions of the summer holiday mid-morning slot, the Children's BBC Breakfast Show and the summer holiday children's programme Up For It, until the CBBC Scotland opt outs were discontinued by July 2000.

== International versions ==
=== Australia ===
On 15 March 2021, it was announced by Australian provider Fetch TV that they would launch a channel called "BBC Kids" (unrelated to a Canadian BBC-branded channel of the same name) on 24 April 2021, to replace Cartoon Network and Boomerang. It was essentially a version of CBBC for the country, as it was aimed at the same target audience as CBBC and aired children's programmes from the BBC Studios catalogue. On 31 October 2024, it was removed from Fetch TV along with CBeebies.

=== United States ===
On 11 January 2022, an American version of BBC Kids launched as a FAST channel on Pluto TV. This version, similar to the Australian version, aired children's programming from the BBC Studios catalogue, and also aired preschool content from CBeebies as well. A version of the channel that aired Spanish-dubbed programming titled "Niños por BBC" was launched on the same day. The channel has since been removed from Pluto TV but continues to air on other services.

== Logo history ==
This logo, which coincided with a corporate rebrand of the BBC, was used from October 1997 until the launch of the television channels in 2002.

This logo, consisting of a green bug with a C in purple was introduced with the CBBC channel's launch on 11 February 2002, to coincide with it.

A three-dimensional version of the "bug" logo was introduced on 1 October 2005.

A rebrand was introduced on 3 September 2007, and the logo was used until 13 March 2016.

This symbol, showing all the letters making up the channel's name into just one "C" was created by Red Bee Media and was used from 14 March 2016 to 14 March 2023.

This logo is the 2022 version of the 2016 logo. This logo includes the 2021 BBC logo, and was used until 2023.

An alternative indigo variation of the 2023 logo. This logo is used on the CBBC website.

== See also ==
- BBC Children's and Education – BBC's children's division that holds CBBC.
- CBeebies – BBC's children television channel; serves children under the age of six and is a sister channel of CBBC.
- CBBC idents – identities used by the channel.
- BBC Three – BBC's youth television channel; serves viewers aged 16 to 34.
