= Anjli Mohindra =

British actress

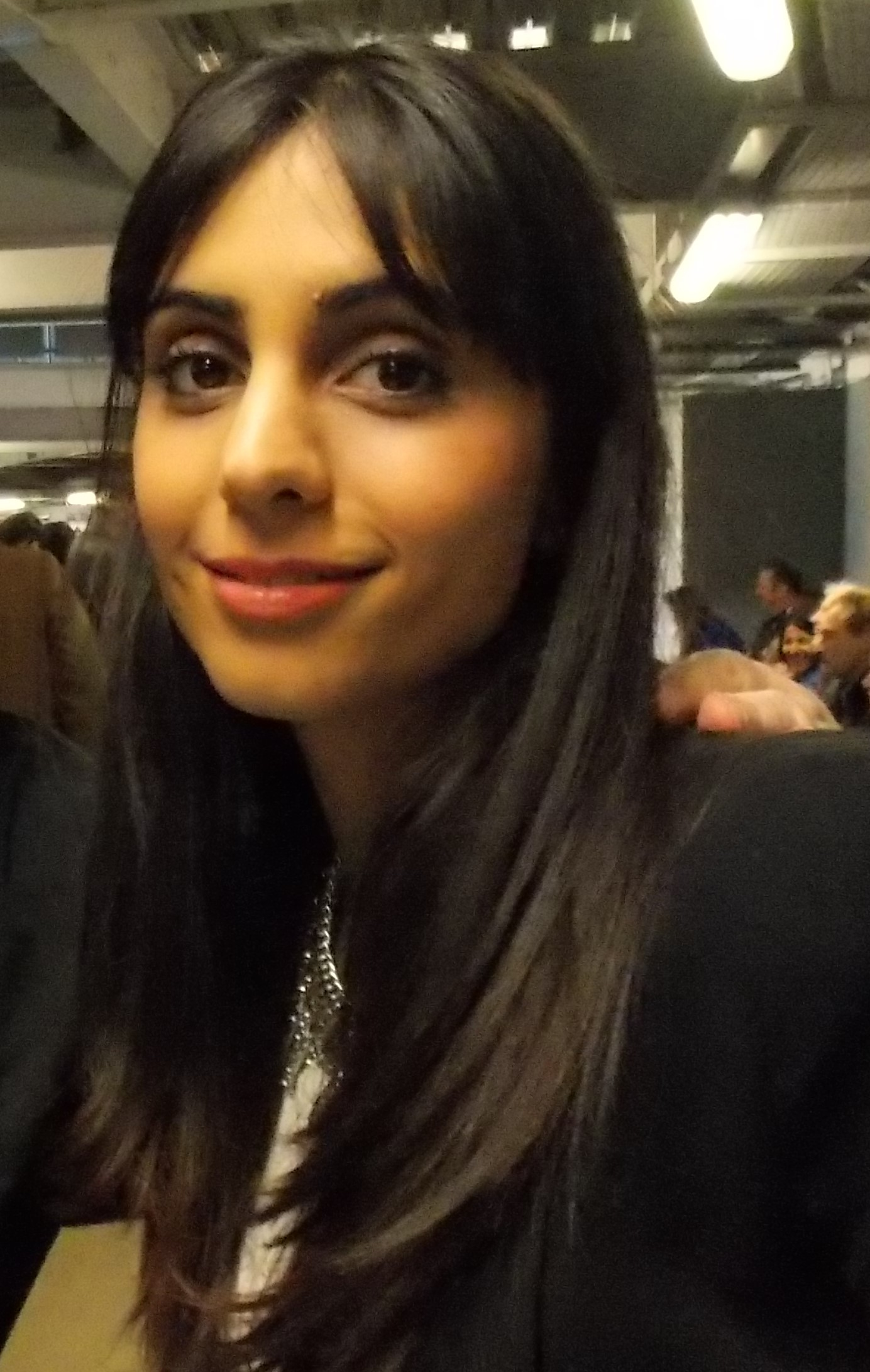
- Mohindra at a fan convention in 2013
- Born: Hendon, London, England
- Education: Central Junior Television Workshop
- Occupation: Actress
- Years active: 2005–present
- Spouse: Sacha Dhawan (m. 2025)

Anjli Mohindra (/ˈændʒli məˈhɪndrə/) is a British actress. She is known for her television roles as Rani Chandra in the Doctor Who spin-off The Sarah Jane Adventures (2008–2011) and Nadia Ali in Bodyguard (2018). Her other television roles include Surgeon Lieutenant Tiffany Docherty in Vigil (2021), Detective Constable Josie Chancellor in Dark Heart (2016–2018) and Archie in The Lazarus Project (2022–2023).

== Early life ==
Anjli Mohindra was born in Hendon, London and mostly grew up in West Bridgford, Nottinghamshire. She also had a four-year period living on a military base in Germany, where she was the only ethnic minority child out of 2,000 students at an Armed Forces school. According to Mohindra, her family is Hindu Punjabi. Her father was raised in Kenya when it was a British colony and had a clerical job in the British Army for several years. Her mother was born in Punjab, India and arrived in the UK at age 18 to further her education, working variously as a court clerk, bank manager, postmistress, pub owner and English tutor.

Mohindra has a sister and a brother. In a 2018 interview about her personal style, Mohindra said that she had been a tomboy growing up, sometimes wearing her brother's hand-me-down clothes.

Mohindra attended Jesse Gray Primary School and West Bridgford School. She later trained in acting at the Central Junior Television Workshop in Nottingham.

== Career ==
=== 2005–2011: Early career ===
Mohindra's television acting career began in an episode of ITV's long-running soap opera Coronation Street in 2005, where she played Dev Alahan's daughter Shareen after being turned down for another, larger role. This appearance was soon followed by small, one-episode parts in the medical soap opera Doctors (2006), teen sitcom The Inbetweeners (2008), police procedural Law & Order: UK (2009) and medical drama Holby City (2010). She also appeared in two episodes of the comedy drama Beaver Falls (2011).

Mohindra played her first regular role as aspiring journalist Rani Chandra in the Doctor Who spin-off series The Sarah Jane Adventures (2008–2011) on children's television channel CBBC. She was introduced in the second series as a replacement for Yasmin Paige, who left the series to complete her GCSEs. Mohindra continued to play the role in the subsequent three series until the last episode of the show, broadcast in October 2011.

=== 2012–present: Post-The Sarah Jane Adventures career ===
In 2012, Mohindra appeared in an episode of the longest-running medical drama series in the world, Casualty. Soon after, she landed parts in two episodes of The Missing (2014), a BAFTA and Golden Globe-nominated child-abduction thriller starring Tchéky Karyo, and six episodes of Cucumber (2015), Russell T Davies's series about a middle-aged gay man from Manchester.

Mohindra played a leading role in four 15-minute episodes of the BBC iPlayer romcom My Jihad (2014–2015), described as "a tender and funny love story exploring the unfolding relationship between a young Muslim couple". She then made her feature film debut in Miss You Already (2015), starring Toni Collette and Drew Barrymore, followed by supporting roles in two ITV shows, Paranoid (2016) and Bancroft (2017).

In 2018, Mohindra played Nadia Ali in Jed Mercurio's political thriller Bodyguard (2018). The series received multiple BAFTA, Emmy and Golden Globe nominations; its finale was reported to be the most-watched BBC drama in 10 years. Mohindra initially declined the role until she learned there would be more depth to her character than she assumed. The same year, she starred alongside Tom Riley in the ITV crime drama Dark Heart and guested in DC's Legends of Tomorrow as magical shapeshifter Charlie. Mohindra starred as an ambitious radio producer in Mark Gatiss's take on the classic Christmas ghost story, The Dead Room (2018), alongside Simon Callow.

From 2006 to 2019, she played in 11 theatrical productions. Her stage work includes David Hare's Behind the Beautiful Forevers (2014) and Shahid Nadeem's Dara (2015), both professionally recorded and broadcast through National Theatre Live, as well as Oscar Wilde's The Importance of Being Earnest (2012) and Michael Frayn's Noises Off (2019).

In 2019, Mohindra appeared as a regular lead in the ITV drama Wild Bill. She later played the Queen of the Skithra in the Doctor Who episode "Nikola Tesla's Night of Terror" (2020). Since 2022, Mohindra has also reprised her role of Rani from The Sarah Jane Adventures in several Doctor Who audio drama spin-offs from Big Finish Productions, as well as in three episodes of Doctor Who: Redacted (2022), a ten-part podcast drama from BBC Sounds featuring the Thirteenth Doctor, played by Jodie Whittaker. Mohindra has played other characters in audio dramas featuring the Fifth, Sixth and Eighth Doctors over the years.

Mohindra won a place on the Royal Court's Young Writers' Programme in 2016. During COVID-19 pandemic, she made her writing debut with a short film called The People Under the Moon (2020), produced entirely during lockdown and starring Gwilym Lee as a medic who joins a dating app.

In 2021, she appeared alongside Suranne Jones in Tom Edge's Vigil, playing Tiffany Docherty, the medical officer on board a nuclear submarine which becomes the subject of a murder investigation. The series quickly became the BBC's most-watched new drama of the year. The following year, she appeared in the Netflix period spy thriller Munich – The Edge of War as a British diplomatic secretary embroiled in the negotiations at the 1938 Munich conference and then had the lead role in the Sky science fiction drama The Lazarus Project, described as a "gripping exploration of memory, fate and the limits of love". In the series she played Archie, who recruits Paapa Essiedu's character George into a secret organisation that has the power to turn back time when the world is threatened by extinction.

== Personal life ==
Mohindra married actor Sacha Dhawan in Tuscany on 30 August 2025.

== Acting credits ==
=== Film ===
Film roles of Anjli Mohindra
Year	Title	Role	Notes
2011	Swagger Wars	Girl's Friend	Short film
2012	The Black Scholes Conspiracy	Dee	Short film
2013	The Painter and the Thief	Sally	Short film
2015	Miss You Already	Kira	
2018	Process	Anaya	Short film
2020	The People Under the Moon	Dating App (voice)	Short film; also writer
2021	Munich – The Edge of War	Joan Menzies	
2023	The Glassworker	Alliz Amano (voice)	

=== Television ===
Television roles of Anjli Mohindra
Year	Title	Role	Notes
2005–2006	Coronation Street	Shareen	2 episodes
2006	Doctors	Gemma Fox	Episode: "Goodbye Mrs Chips"
2008	The Inbetweeners	Charlotte's Friend	Episode: "Will Gets a Girlfriend"
2008–2011	The Sarah Jane Adventures	Rani Chandra	Main role in series 2–5; 41 episodes and a Comic Relief special
2009	Law & Order: UK	Sophie Martin	Episode: "Love and Loss"
2010	Holby City	Mindy Kapoor	Episode: "The Butterfly Effect: Part Two"
2010	Sarah Jane's Alien Files	Rani Chandra	Episode #1.2
2011	Beaver Falls	Saima	2 episodes
2012	Doctors	Meera Singh	Episode: "Firestarter"
2012	Casualty	Meera Hussein	Episode: "Teenage Dreams"
2013	Coming Up	Roxy	Episode: "Doughnuts"
2014–2015	My Jihad	Fahmida	Main role; 4 episodes
2014	The Missing	Amara Suri	2 episodes
2015	Cucumber	Veronica Chandra	6 episodes
2015	Cuffs	Nasreen Iqbal	Episode: "Bringing a Knife to a Gunfight"
2016	Paranoid	PC Megan Waters	Main role; 8 episodes
2016–2018	Dark Heart	DC Josie Chancellor	Main role; 6 episodes
2017	Revolting	Zaynab	Episode #1.1
2017	The Boy with the Topknot	Bindi	TV film
2017	Bancroft	Zaheera Kamara	Main role in series 1; 4 episodes
2018	Midsomer Murders	Faiza Jindal	Episode: "The Ghost of Causton Abbey"
2018	Bodyguard	Nadia Ali	4 episodes
2018	The Bisexual	Katie	Episode #1.1
2018	Legends of Tomorrow	Charlie	Episode: "Dancing Queen"
2018	The Dead Room	Tara Lohia	TV film
2019	Wild Bill	DCC Lydia Price	Main role; 6 episodes
2020	Doctor Who	Queen Skithra	Episode: "Nikola Tesla's Night of Terror"
2020	Daleks!	Mechanoid Queen (voice)	Animated series released on YouTube; 3 episodes
2021	Vigil	Surgeon Lieutenant Tiffany Docherty	6 episodes
2022–2023	The Lazarus Project	Archie	Main role; 8 episodes (Series 1) and 8 episodes (Series 2)
2022	The Suspect	DS Riya Devi	5 episodes
2022	The Peripheral	Beatrice	3 episodes
2024	The Red King	Grace Narayan	Lead role
2024	Get Millie Black	Meera Thakur	3 episodes
2025	Fear	Rebecca	Lead role
2026	Half Man	Ava	4 episodes
TBA	Saviour	Indy Sangar	Main role
TBA	Army of Shadows		Upcoming series

=== Theatre ===
Theatre roles of Anjli Mohindra
Year	Title	Role	Venue	Notes	Ref.
2025	The Years	Annie 2 (Lead role)	Harold Pinter Theatre	Adapted and directed by Eline Arbo	

=== Audio and radio dramas ===
Audio and radio drama roles of Anjli Mohindra
Year	Title	Role	Production	Notes	Ref.
2012	Bernice Summerfield	Gabriella Dominicci	Big Finish Productions	Episode: "Brand Management"	
2013	Gallifrey	Maris	Big Finish Productions	Episode: "Evolution"	
2014	Doctor Who: The Monthly Adventures	Jyoti Cutler	Big Finish Productions	Episode: "Scavenger"	
2017	Tumanbay	Hodah	BBC Radio 4	3 episodes	
2019	The Eighth Doctor: The Time War	Calla	Big Finish Productions	Episode: "State of Bliss"	
2020	A Room of One's Own	Judith Shakespeare / Jane Austen / Mary Carmichael	BBC Radio 4		
2020	Prostrate	Anita	BBC Radio 4	5 episodes	
2020	Doctor Who: The Fifth Doctor Adventures	Captain Riya Nehru	Big Finish Productions	Episode: "The Moonrakers"	
2020	The Tenth Doctor and River Song	Omara / Barmaid / Fanny	Big Finish Productions	Episode: "Precious Annihilation"	
2020	Doctor Who: The Monthly Adventures	Various Characters	Big Finish Productions	8 episodes of Shadow of the Daleks	
2021	Passenger List	Evelyn / School Secretary	BBC Radio 4	2 episodes	
2021	Doctor Who: Stranded	Nisha	Big Finish Productions	Episode: "Baker Street Irregulars"	
2021	The Goldilocks Zone	Zara	BBC Radio 4		
2022	The Eighth of March	Rani Chandra	Big Finish Productions	Episode: "The Turn of the Tides"	
2022–2023	Doctor Who: Redacted	Rani Chandra	BBC Sounds	5 episodes	
2023–2024	Rani Takes on the World	Rani Chandra	Big Finish Productions	6 episodes	

=== Audiobook narration ===
Audiobook narration roles of Anjli Mohindra
Year	Title	Author	Notes	Ref.
2011	Judgement Day	Scott Gray	Part of the audio series The Sarah Jane Adventures Collection	
2017	The Secret Lives of the Amir Sisters	Nadiya Hussain	Co-narrated with actresses Avita Jay, Maya Saroya and Aasiya Shah	
2019	How to Find Home	Mahsuda Snaith	Abridged by Siân Preece and broadcast in 10 parts on BBC Radio 4	
2019	The Million Pieces of Neena Gill	Emma Smith-Barton		
2019	The Panther's Tale	Mahsuda Snaith	Part of Audible's podcast series Hag	
2019	The Things We Thought We Knew	Mahsuda Snaith		
2019	Mrs Dalloway	Virginia Woolf		

=== Video games ===
Video game roles of Anjli Mohindra
Year	Title	Role	Notes
2011	Plants	Rani Chandra (voice)	
2011	Plant and Animal Habitats	Rani Chandra (voice)	
2011	Teeth and Eating	Rani Chandra (voice)	
2011	Rocks and Soils	Rani Chandra (voice)	
2015	Dragon Quest Heroes: The World Tree's Woe and the Blight Below	Maya Mahabala (voice)	English version
2016	Dragon Quest Heroes II	Maya Mahabala (voice)	English version
2022	Elden Ring	Millicent (voice)	Demo Only
