= Daniel Anthony (actor) =

British actor

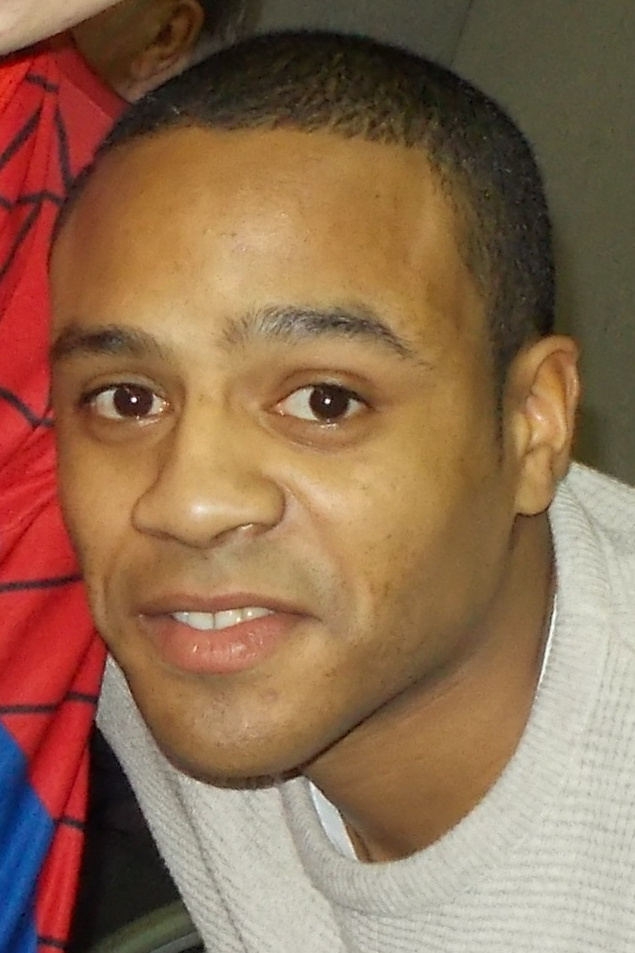
- Anthony in 2016
- Born: London, England
- Occupation: Actor
- Years active: 1994–present
- Known for: The Sarah Jane Adventures (2007–2011); Casualty (2013–2014)

Daniel Anthony is an English actor. He is known for his regular roles as Clyde Langer in the Doctor Who spin-off series The Sarah Jane Adventures (2007–2011) as Jamie Collier in the medical drama Casualty (2013–2014) and as the voice of Horace the frog in Guess with Jess (2009–2010).

== Early life and inspiration ==
Anthony was a shy and socially awkward boy, so his mother sent him to a drama club in South London to bring him out of himself. He fell in love with acting and was noticed and signed up by the talent agency that owned the club.

Anthony cites Will Smith's performance in the sitcom The Fresh Prince of Bel-Air (1990–1996) as his early inspiration for acting.

== Career ==
He started his career as a child actor, appearing in several West End musicals, including the original production of The Lion King (1999) as young Simba, and Sam Mendes's revival of Oliver! (1994) at the London Palladium. On stage, he has also played Curtis Younger in the Young Vic's A Raisin in the Sun (2001) and Pip in Moby-Dick (2006). In 2003, he voiced Will Parry in the BBC Radio 4 production of the His Dark Materials trilogy.

His early television roles include JJ in EastEnders (2004), Lex Keavey in Doctors (2006), and Danny in As the Bell Rings (2007). For his performance in Doctors, he was nominated for a British Soap Award for Best Newcomer and longlisted for Villain of the Year.

In 2008, he appeared as Kez in Dis/Connected, a BBC Three drama pilot about a young girl committing suicide and the impact it has on her friends. He then made a brief appearance as a thug in the ITV drama Demons (2009), and played Jack in the BBC musical film Rules of Love (2010) about a boy from the wrong side of town (Jake Roche) and an ambitious boarding school girl (Daisy Head).

From 2013 to 2014, he was a regular in the medical drama Casualty, playing Jamie Collier, the nephew of already established character Jeff. He has described his character as "the calm one, the voice of reason". He then starred as Royston Peel in the crime drama Brotherhood (2016). In 2021, he joined the UK touring cast of Magic Goes Wrong in the role of Mickey.

=== The Sarah Jane Adventures ===
He appeared as a series regular in the Doctor Who spin-off series The Sarah Jane Adventures from 2007 to 2011, playing Clyde Langer. Speaking about his character, Anthony said, "I would describe Clyde as the joker of the group. He always has an answer for everything, even though 99% of the time it was probably wrong! I really enjoy playing comedy so, for me, this character was a dream". He has also narrated The Sarah Jane Adventures audiobook Children of Steel (2011), written by Martin Day, and briefly reprised his role in the 2020 webcast mini episode "Farewell, Sarah Jane", aired on Doctor Who's social media channels as a tribute to Elisabeth Sladen.

In 2022, it was announced that Big Finish Productions would produce an audio spin-off of The Sarah Jane Adventures, Beyond Bannerman Road: Rani Takes on the World, set 15 years after the events of the series and focusing on Anthony and Anjli Mohindra's characters. He previously played Delong in the Big Finish Doctor Who audio story "Wirrn Dawn" (2009), starring Paul McGann as the Eighth Doctor, and Julian Delaware in the Torchwood audio story "The Law Machines" (2018). With his role of Delong, he became the first regular actor from the BBC Wales-produced Doctor Who-related series to have participated in a Big Finish production.

In 2023, Anthony reprised his role as Clyde Langer in Tales of the TARDIS.

== Filmography ==
=== Television ===
Year	Title	Role	Notes
2001	Casualty	Tyrone Harris	Episode: "Better Safe Than Sorry"
2004	EastEnders	JJ	4 episodes
2006	Dream Team	Eugene	Episode: "War of the Roses"
2006	Doctors	Lex Keavey	Recurring role; 11 episodes
2006	Coming Up	Danjah	Episode: "Happy $lapz"
2006	Casualty	Niall Gorton	Episode: "Heads Together"
2007	As The Bell Rings	Danny	Series regular
2007–2011	The Sarah Jane Adventures	Clyde Langer	Main role; 52 episodes and a Comic Relief special
2008	A Touch of Frost	Lewis	Episode: "Dead End"
2009	Guess with Jess	Horace	Voice role; series regular
2009	Demons	Ashley	Episode: "Smitten"
2011	My Sarah Jane: A Tribute to Elisabeth Sladen	Himself	Doctor Who Confidential special
2011	Casualty	Lee Stark	Episode: "Starting Out"
2013–2014	Casualty	Jamie Collier	47 episodes: Series regular from "Rabbits in Headlights" to "Once in a Lifetime"; Guest in "The Last Call"
2023	Tales of the TARDIS	Clyde Langer	Episode: "The Three Doctors"

=== Film ===
Year	Title	Role	Notes
2008	Dis/Connected	Kez	TV film
2008	Leo	Security guard	Short film
2010	Rules of Love	Jack	
2016	Brotherhood	Royston Peel	
2019	The Money Tree	Jason	Short film
2019	Rumet	Alby James	

=== Stage ===
Year	Title	Role	Notes
1994	Oliver!	Nipper	London Palladium
1999	The Lion King	Young Simba	Lyceum Theatre
2001	A Raisin in the Sun	Curtis Younger	Young Vic
2006	Moby-Dick	Pip	Compass Theatre Company
2021	Magic Goes Wrong	Mickey	UK tour
2024	The Play That Goes Wrong	Dennis	Duchess Theatre

=== Audio ===
Year	Title	Role	Notes
2003	His Dark Materials	Will Parry	BBC Radio 4 adaptation
2009	The Eighth Doctor Adventures	Delong	Story: "Wirrn Dawn"
2011	Children of Steel	Narrator	Part of The Sarah Jane Adventures Collection
2018	Torchwood One	Julian Delaware	Story: "The Law Machines"
2020	The Waringham Chronicles	Various	Audible drama based on the novels by Rebecca Gablé
2023	Rani Takes on the World	Clyde Langer	Spin-off of The Sarah Jane Adventures

=== Video games ===
Year	Title	Role	Notes
2007	Harry Potter and the Order of the Phoenix	Slytherin student	
2011	Earth, Sun and Moon	Narrator	BBC Bitesize games published on The Sarah Jane Adventures website
2011	Light	Narrator	BBC Bitesize games published on The Sarah Jane Adventures website
2011	Material Properties	Narrator	BBC Bitesize games published on The Sarah Jane Adventures website
2011	Sound	Narrator	BBC Bitesize games published on The Sarah Jane Adventures website

== Awards and nominations ==
- 2006: Nominated for a British Soap Award for Best Newcomer for Doctors
- 2006: Longlisted for a British Soap Award for Villain of the Year for Doctors
