= Martyn Pick =

British animator and director

- Occupations: director, animation director, live action director,
- Website: http://www.martynpick.com

Martyn Pick is a director and artist recognised for a distinctive fusion of live-action and animation. In feature films, commercials, and shorts he applies his fluid, cinematic storytelling working across pure live-action, computer, and hand animation.

In recent years he has moved into features and TV series. He directed the CGI film: "Ultramarines: A Warhammer 40,000 Movie" and the live action thriller/horror features "Evil Never Dies" and "Heckle". On Netflix/ITV's Robozuna he was Head of Story and Voice Director for 40 half hour episodes and on Netflix's "Kitti Katz" he was co-director.

Credits include the 2009 film The Age of Stupid as animation director. London 2012, the promotional film for the 2012 Olympics; and the celebrated BBC promotional trailers for the Euro 2004 soccer tournament; and the Budweiser 2001 NBA commercials. Late commercials are for Thatchers Cider (2014), Magic the Gathering (2019) and Tata Steel (2022). A striking use of his animation/live action style was in sequences in the acclaimed feature documentary "Coup 53" .

He has applied his painterly filmic style in illustrated books on "Beowulf" and "Witchcraft" for Penguin.

Martyn Pick studied film and fine art at Saint Martin's School of Art and the crossover of painting and cinema has driven his work ever since.

== Career as Animation/Live Action Director ==
Early animated films such as "Spectres" (1987)"Taboo of Dirt" (1988) and "Signature"(BFI New Directors Award 1990) were characterised by raw gritty charcoal drawing, wild fluid movement and brutal subject matter. At odds with dominant commercial cartoon style they were screened in art galleries, international film festivals and on television establishing his distinctive voice as an animator and filmmaker. Early commissions were for Rough Trade records, Siouxsie and the Banshees and David Byrne.

In the 1990s working as a commercial director in Soho production companies Pick applied his style to many commercials, promos and TV idents. He began to introduce live-action performance, CGI and digital compositing into the expressionist flow of his animation. Clients included Mick Jagger, BBC, STV and the Rolling Stones.

In the Channel 4 commissioned short film "PLAZA" (2000) which was screened at top film festivals including London Film Festival, Raindance and Edinburgh Film Festival. As well as his earlier shorts "Beat Poem" and "Signature" "Plaza" was screened at the prestigious Annecy Animation Festival. he created a tension between a savage animation subconscious and the placid live action reality that it shatters. In Campaign magazine that year it was in the top ten short films from around the world and it received the Process award for visual excellence.

This led to the FilmFour commission "GREEN" which was his first pure live-action drama. "PLAZA" was also the basis of a commercial for Budweiser for the US which used the same abrasive mix of raw scratched animation corroding live-action. At the same time he directed six high profile sixty second commercials for the American corporation ADM through the agency FCB. These were a strong commercial application of all the experiments with integrating live action and CGI into fluid painterly hand animation.

They received massive exposure on US networks and won the Gold Plaque for Animation at the Chicago Film Festival.

In 2004 he directed his biggest ever job in the UK which was the BBC promotional trailers for the EURO 2004 tournament in which live-action of famous European footballers were treated in an eclectic mix of painterly styles. This received the Silver Promax award.

Soon after he completed his first live-action commercial for the UK. In 2006 he worked as animation consultant on Brett Morgens documentary feature Chicago 10.

In 2007 he started work as animation director on Franny Armstrong's climate change documentary feature The Age of Stupid (Spanner Films, Passion Pictures). In this he blended live action, CGI and matte paintings with a painterly, cinematic look. This award winning film was released to intense media interest and acclaim in March 2009.

In 2008 he was commissioned by Film London and the London Development Agency to make "London" a five-minute film celebrating the capitals edge and diversity in the run up to the 2012 Olympics. This made particular use of a technique he had developed in the test film "Blythborough" where he painted directly into live action footage using digital tools, making the digital manipulation of live action more direct and spontaneous. The resulting film produced by Th1ng was premiered at the Beijing Olympics.

In 2009 he directed a promo for U2.

=== Ultramarines: A Warhammer 40,000 Movie ===
Ultramarines: The Movie (2010) was Pick's first feature film as Director. Ultramarines: The Movie is a 70-minute CGI, sci-fi, thriller, set in Games Workshop's fictional Warhammer 40,000 universe and based around the Ultramarines Chapter of Space Marines (Warhammer 40,000). The screenplay was written by Black Library author Dan Abnett. Martyn worked in London and Cardiff directing pre and post production and in Montreal on the animation. Image Metrics in Santa Monica did the facial capture for the film. Shot at London's Abbey Road studios the film features the facial capture and voice acting of Terence Stamp, Sean Pertwee, Johnny Harris, Steven Waddington and John Hurt.

== Later Short Form and Art Work ==
At Primefocus London he directed commercials including "Body Paint" for J Walter Thompson and one for an exhibition of J M W Turner's artwork at the National Gallery of Ireland. At The Unit he directed a much screened commercial for Thatchers Cider using an atmospheric refinement of his digital painting technique.

In 2016 he directed the live action short horror film "Blue Moon" which premiered at Americas biggest horror film festival, Screamfestla, at Grauman's Chinese Theatre in Hollywood.

For "Magic the Gathering" and "League of Legends" he directed a series of live action commercials in 2019 and 2020.

"Fulci Funhaus" is an art animation short film going back to Martyn's early wild metamorphic fine art style. It was screened at the Museum of Club Culture in Hull and part of the artists touring exhibition Empire. Which played at the Venice Biennale in 2018, the Cinema Museum in London and in Oaxaca, Mexico.

In 2022 he directed an epic multi media short film for Tata Steel through JWT Mumbai, mixing cgi and live action with his digital painting.

He reunited with Franny Armstrong from The Age of Stupid for the climate change short "Out of the Ashes" featuring the noted academic Rupert Read. After its release in October 2022 the film was viewed on various platforms and in selected cinemas by two thirds of a million people.

In illustration he has done many book covers including a cover for "Engine Summer" for Orion and endpapers for an exclusive limited edition "Wheel of Time" hardback for Little, Brown Book Group.

For Penguin books he illustrated the Ladybird books "Witchcraft" written by Dr Suzannah Lipscomb, and "Beowulf" by Dr Janina Ramirez. This was a great opportunity to really explore a rich vision with strong writers and serious historical content.

== Later Feature Films and TV/Streaming Series ==
In 2013 he completed directing the live action supernatural thriller "Evil Never Dies" featuring (Katy Manning, PH Moriarty, Tony Scannell, Graham Cole and Anouska Mond) and which was distributed by Taylor and Dodge and 4DigitalMedia.

He developed as director on a UK/Chinese sci-fi CGI fantasy franchise, working in the UK and in Beijing.

On the acclaimed documentary feature "Women of 1915" (dir Bared Maronian) he directed the animation for the 2 minute opening. It further developed his "painting into pixels" technique into mythological imagery of ancient Armenian gods. This sequence was nominated for a regional Emmy.

The horror feature "Heckle" featuring Steve Guttenberg, Toyah Willcox, Dani Dyer, and Guy Coombes, he directed in 2019. Cinematography and art direction had a strong giallo influence. This premiered at Frightfest (The UKs biggest horror festival) in 2020. It was picked up for distribution by Evolutionary Films and Sky TV.

In 2019 the animation sequences he directed in “Coup 53” (dir Taghi Amirani), were a great use of his art approach. This documentary feature was edited by the legendary Walter Murch (inventor of sound design and editor on Apocalypse Now, The Godfather, THX1138, The Talented Mr Ripley, The Conversation). Where there was no footage of riots in Tehran in the 1950's Martyn staged sequences that with his digital painting technique blended seamlessly with archive footage to create a visceral emotive effect. The storyboarding and design was influenced by Sam Peckinpah and Paul Greengrass. The feature itself received critical acclaim around the globe with 5 star reviews and a 100% rating on Rotten Tomatoes. The animation sequences themselves were picked out for praise from the Wall Street Journal, The Telegraph, Evening Standard, Time Out and Empire magazine.

On the Netflix/ITV kids cgi sci-series Robozuna (40 half hour episodes) he was Head of Story and Voice Director. It was important to, within the genre, give a cinematic, action slant to the composition and staging of this tale of gladiatorial combat between robots and insurgency against an evil empire. Released in 2018 Robozuna was well received by global audiences.

In 2021 he created the world building concept art for "Rise of the Witches" for MBC. This matched Pick's sweeping painterly style with a contemporary epic fantasy vision.

He co-directed the Netflix Original kids cgi series "Kitti Katz" (10 half hour episodes) 2022. The story was set in a cyber-noir future with three teenage girls turning into feline superheroes to save the world. It was important to give a dynamic graphic novel kick to show the journey from the kids secure ordinary world to one of extreme superhero jeopardy. This high end show was popular on release, reaching No.4 on the Netflix Kids UK Chart.

His graphic novel Siege has been developed and optioned as a feature. He continues to develop projects that build on and refine his storytelling style.
