= Louis Selwyn =

English actor and producer

Louis Selwyn (born 20th century) is an English actor and film producer.

He portrayed Martin Downes, the only child of Bet Lynch in Coronation Street. He is known for his early roles in the BBC's The Three Musketeers and on stage at The Royal Shakespeare Company, as well as later appearances in the series The Strauss Family as Josef Strauss, and later as Jofre Borgia in The Borgias, both for the BBC. He went on to play Mick Jagger in Let the Good Stones Roll with Sara Coward at the Ambassadors Theatre in the West End and on to roles at The Royal National Theatre's Olivier Theatre. He released a record, Bind Your Love in Heaven, in 2001 on his own label Quantum Records.

Selwyn has since been credited as a producer on four feature-length films including Evil Never Dies in which he also starred as 'Gordon'.

He stars in an upcoming Hitchcockian thriller/comedy horror Heckle, due for release in 2021.

== Stage ==
Louis Selwyn began his stage work, as a child actor, with the Royal Shakespeare Company in 1966 in a production of Henry V, Part 2, alongside Malcolm McDowell, Sir Patrick Stewart, OBE, Sir Ian Holm CBE and Frances de la Tour. He was known to the cast and crew as 'Little Louis'. He went on to take another part immediately after the show closed, again at the RSC, but this time on Twelfth Night alongside Dame Diana Rigg under the directorship of Clifford Williams.

In his early twenties, Selwyn appeared in the West End at the Ambassadors Theatre as Mick Jagger in a production of Rayner Bourton's Let the Good Stones Roll.

IN 1979, Selwyn was drawn to the Royal National Theatre, appearing at The Olivier Theatre in four separate productions. He played William in As You Like It, directed by John Dexter, alongside Dermot Crowley and Oz Clarke, followed by a role as Messenger in Richard III, alongside Michael Beint and Mary Wimbush and directed by Christopher Morahan. The next production that year was Amadeus, appearing alongside Felicity Kendal and Simon Callow and directed by Peter Hall. The final production at the Olivier Theatre in December 1979 was Henrik Ibsen's The Wild Duck, alongside Sir Ralph Richardson.

== Television ==
Selwyn began his television career, as a child actor, in 1967 playing the young King Louis in 13 episodes of the series The Further Adventure of the Musketeers for the BBC, followed by further BBC parts that year on Not in Front of the Children, Merry Go Round and A Hundred Years of Humphrey Hastings. In 1968, Selwyn played Roger Perry in a two-part story on Season 6 of the Z Cars series.

In 1969, he again took a role with the BBC in The First Lady with Thora Hird, followed by an appearance on ITV Sunday Night Theatre and later, in 1970, on ITV Sunday Night Drama.

The Strauss Family, in 1972, saw Selwyn play Josef Strauss in three episodes of the television miniseries alongside Barbara Ferris and Jane Seymour.

Selwyn played Jabir in QB VII, a 1974 miniseries starring Sir Anthony Hopkins, Leslie Caron and Anthony Quayle. The series was considered a television milestone, dealing with difficult subjects surrounding World War II, it was based on the book by Leon Uris. This same year, Louis played Martin Downdes, the son of Bet Lynch whom she gave up for adoption, in Coronation Street. He would appear twice before the character was tragically killed, never having introduced himself to his mother.

In 1978, he played a hijacker in the series Life at Stake for the BBC, after which he played Jofre Borgia in the BBC television miniseries The Borgias. He later played a small part in Tender Is the Night, Dennis Potter's BBC adaptation of the F. Scott Fitzgerald novel of the same name, starring Timothy West.

== Film ==
In 1960, Louis played an Apprentice in Cry of the Banshee with Vincent Price and Michael Elphick. It was a British horror film released by American International Pictures and directed by Gordon Hessler. Terry Gilliam is credited with producing the original animated title sequence.

Caught Looking was a 1991 short film starring Selwyn as the "voyeur", alongside iconic actor and activist Bette Bourne as narrator. It won the Teddy award for Best Short Film at Berlin International Film Festival.

Leo Asemota's Palindrome r.s.s.r, released in 2002, was billed as a cinematic installation examining the issues of race, sex and religion. Louis played Simon Peter.

Selwyn played "Gordon" in the horror/thriller film Evil Never Dies, alongside Tony Scannell, in 2014. Selwyn is credited as producer on the movie. Continuing in the genre, he later played Charles on Blue Moon, also directed by Martyn Pick, on which Selwyn is also credited as producer. It was screened at Grauman's Chinese Theatre in Hollywood as part of the Screamfest Horror Film Festival. Originally for release in 2019, Louis Selwyn has most recently featured in the comedy/horror Heckle, starring Steve Guttenberg, Clark Gable III and Toyah Willcox, this movie features in the 2020 Frightfest Digital Festival. Louis is also credited as producer on Heckle.
