= Aria Films =

British film company

- Type: Private limited company
- Industry: Film production; film financing; consultancy
- Founded: 31 January 2002
- Founder: Carlo Dusi
- Defunct: 10 July 2018
- Headquarters: London, United Kingdom

Aria Films was set up at the beginning of 2002 as a film production, financing and consultancy outfit by Carlo Dusi. It is based in London.

Aria's first developed feature, Gareth Maxwell Roberts's Kill Kill Faster Faster, won the Best International Feature Film prize at the 2008 London Independent Film Festival, Best Independent Feature award at the UK Charity Erotic Awards, and the Los Angeles 2008 HDFest Awards for Best Cinematography and Best Editing.

In 2007, Aria co-produced for the Kasander Film Company Peter Greenaway's Nightwatching. The film stars Martin Freeman as Dutch painter Rembrandt alongside Jodhi May, Eva Birthistle, Natalie Press and Toby Jones and premiered at the 2007 Venice and Toronto Film Festivals. Another Aria co-production for Axiom Films International, Broken Lines, starring Paul Bettany and Olivia Williams, was an official selection of the Venice Film Festival 2008's Venice Days section as well as the 2008 London Film Festival.

In 2009, Aria saw the release of 1999 Academy Award nominee Paul Morrison's Little Ashes, which it had co-developed with APT Films and co-produced with Factotum Barcelona and Met Film Production. The film focuses on the lives and loves of artist Salvador Dalí, poet Federico García Lorca and filmmaker Luis Buñuel, and was shot in late 2007 in and around Barcelona. Robert Pattinson, a London-born actor best known to cinema audiences as Edward Cullen in Twilight, stars as Dalí, while Lorca is played by Spanish actor Javier Beltrán and Buñuel by Matthew McNulty, who had previously appeared in Control (the biopic of Joy Division singer Ian Curtis).

Subsequently, Aria executive produced Alicia Duffy's debut feature All Good Children for Jonathan Cavendish's new outfit Caveman Films.

In 2012, Aria and the Script Connection launched Story-HQ.com, an online platform offering development services for screenwriters and producers.
