= When Darkness Falls (2006 Rohan Spong film) =

2006 film directed by Rohan Spong

- Directed by: Rohan Spong
- Written by: Rohan Spong
- Produced by: Mel Wigg
- Starring: Sarah Bollenberg; Elizabeth Sandy; Natalie Bassingthwaighte; Katy Manning
- Release date: 8 July 2006
- Running time: 58 minutes
- Country: Australia
- Language: English

When Darkness Falls is a 2006 Australian drama film written and directed by Rohan Spong that starred Sarah Bollenberg, Elizabeth Sandy and Natalie Bassingthwaighte. It was released on 8 July 2006.

== Cast ==
- Sarah Bollenberg as Virginia Martin
- Elizabeth Sandy as Betsy Sloane
- Natalie Bassingthwaighte as Jinx de Luxe
- Katy Manning as Miss Harrington
- Olivia Crang as Josephine
- Angelina Elkin as Izzy Edwards
- Justin Hosking as Spud Cain
- Toby Newton as Police Commissioner Ed
- Peter Stratford as Coroner Paul Jenkins
- Trent Baker as Harry
- Randall Berger as Mayor Alfred
- Natalie Hoflin as Laura

== Release ==
The film was released on 8 July 2006 at the Melbourne Underground Film Festival.

== Reception ==
The film was a hit with critics, with some saying that it "heralded the rebirth of the Australian shorter feature film" and that it was an "accomplished homage to film noir". Katy Manning won Best Supporting Actress at the Melbourne Underground Film Festival for her role as Miss Harrington. The film was given several awards as it toured the festival circuits.
