= Katy Manning =

British actress (born 1946)

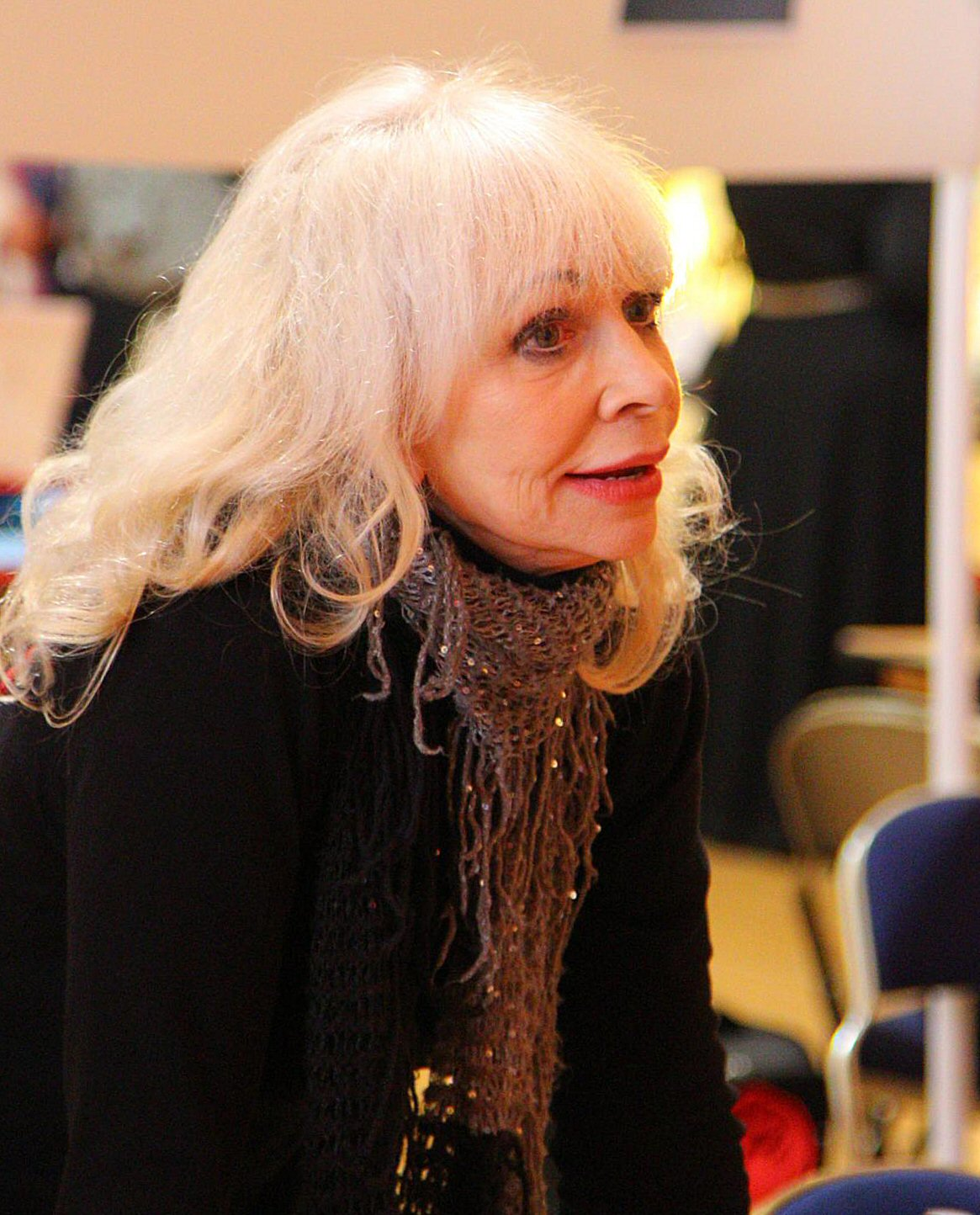
- Manning at Geek Fest 2014, Folkestone
- Born: Catherine Ann Manning; 14 October 1946 (age 80); Guildford, Surrey, England
- Education: Webber Douglas Academy of Dramatic Art
- Occupation: Actress
- Years active: 1969–present
- Known for: Jo Grant in Doctor Who; The Sarah Jane Adventures
- Partners: Stewart Bevan (1972–1974); Dean Harris (1976–1981); Barry Crocker (1990–present)
- Children: 2
- Father: J. L. Manning
- Relatives: Clive Hicks-Jenkins (cousin); Brian Manning (half-uncle)
- Website: katymanning.com

Catherine Ann Manning (born 14 October 1946) is a British actress. Although she has made many appearances on both screen and stage, Manning is best known for her part as the companion Jo Grant in the BBC science fiction television series Doctor Who. Manning initially played the role regularly from 1971 to 1973 but also reprised the role in the Doctor Who spin-off The Sarah Jane Adventures in 2010. She is also well known for voicing Iris Wildthyme in the audio series Iris Wildthyme for Big Finish Productions since 2005.

Moving to Australia in 1982, Manning continued her career before moving to Los Angeles in the 1990s and then returning to Australia. She has also made many theatre appearances, including two one-woman shows and playing Mary Smith in the first run of the play Run for Your Wife and Rita in Educating Rita at the Sydney Opera House.

Since 1990, Manning has been in a relationship with Australian entertainer and singer Barry Crocker and is now an Australian citizen. In 2009, Manning moved back to the UK to pursue new acting work and currently lives in London.

== Early life ==
Manning was born in Guildford, Surrey, the younger daughter of Amy (née Jenkins) and politician turned sports columnist J. L. Manning; her elder sister Jane Dressler (née Manning) moved to New York City, and became a fashion model for Eileen Ford. She spent her early years in Dulwich Village. Manning was severely myopic, but teachers failed to understand her condition and she was teased by the other children for having poor eyesight and wearing large glasses. Manning then attended Miss Dixon and Miss Wolfe's School for Girls where she became best friends with classmate Liza Minnelli, daughter of Judy Garland, and spent a lot of time at Garland and Sidney Luft's home in Chelsea. She socialised with stars such as James Mason and Dirk Bogarde, and had tea with Noël Coward at The Savoy. As a teenager, she became a model for Biba.

Aged sixteen, Manning suffered serious injuries in a car crash after the driver, her boyfriend Brian Gascoigne (brother of Bamber Gascoigne), fell asleep at the wheel. The car, which had no seatbelts, went over a roundabout and crashed into a garage. Manning was thrown through the windscreen and through a plate glass window ending up on the bonnet of the car, leaving her back and both her legs broken and her face disfigured. It took nine policemen to retrieve her from the wreckage and Manning later said of her injuries that her "eye and mouth on one side of [her] face sort of met". She was taken to hospital in the police car as it was thought that she would not survive the time for an ambulance to arrive. She had to spend nearly two years recovering in hospital and had several skin grafts on her face, as well as reconstructive surgery at Queen Victoria Hospital in East Grinstead. Manning suffered an embolism and had to have both her legs pinned which put an end to her dreams of becoming a dancer.

Manning went to the US to stay with her sister to recover, and later on was offered a five-year contract with MGM by Arthur Mayer at one of her sister's house parties, although she turned it down in fear of not fulfilling a film in her contract. Inspired by this, upon her return to the UK, Manning trained at the Webber Douglas Academy of Dramatic Art, and then joined a Wolverhampton repertory company. Her first screen credit was in an egg commercial which also starred Jacqueline Bisset. Manning then made her TV debut in the BBC drama Softly, Softly: Taskforce, in the episode 'Standing Orders'. Shortly after, she was seen in two episodes playing Julia Dungarvon in ITV's Man At The Top. Manning was originally given the small role of a French au-pair girl for one episode, however during filming the producers, impressed with her performance, instead gave her a larger role in two episodes.

== Career ==
=== Doctor Who ===
Manning played the part of Jo Grant from 1971 to 1973 alongside Jon Pertwee's incarnation of the Doctor. She struck up an immediate rapport with her co-stars Pertwee, Nicholas Courtney (The Brigadier), John Levene (Sergeant Benton), Richard Franklin (Captain Mike Yates) and Roger Delgado (the Master). Fans of Doctor Who often refer to these characters as the UNIT family — UNIT, the United Nations Intelligence Taskforce, being the fictional United Nations organisation that the Doctor worked for.

Making her debut in the first part of the serial Terror of the Autons, the character of Jo Grant instantly became liked by audiences to the extent that she is often thought of as the archetypal companion along with Sarah Jane Smith and Rose Tyler. Manning said of her performance: "The little kiddies really got me. Older men found it quite pleasant to look at me. The mothers and girls didn't feel threatened and loved Jo's trendy clothes and rings." Patrick Mulkern of the Radio Times said of her portrayal that "she had it all: innocence and gumption, courage and a terrific scream, an irresistible bubbly mixture of tomboy and sexpot." Unlike other companions, Jo wore clothes that were in fashion at the time including go-go boots and miniskirts. In an interview with Radio Times in 1972, Manning said she wore her own clothes when playing Jo.

Manning had a particularly close relationship with Pertwee to the extent that he would pick her up every day from outside her house, either in his car or on his motorbike where she would ride pillion, and take her for filming or rehearsals for Doctor Who. They had races with Dick Emery and Sir Ralph Richardson to see who could get to the BBC studios first. Manning would also spend time at Pertwee's villa in Ibiza with his family.

After three years on Doctor Who, Manning decided to leave the show to move on to other acting work. Pertwee was reportedly very sad at her departure due to their close working relationship and cited Manning leaving and the death of Delgado as two major reasons why he left the show a year later. In Manning's exit in The Green Death, she leaves the Doctor to marry Professor Clifford Jones (Stewart Bevan); Mark Harrison of Den of Geek named it "a bittersweet exit for one of the most popular companions."

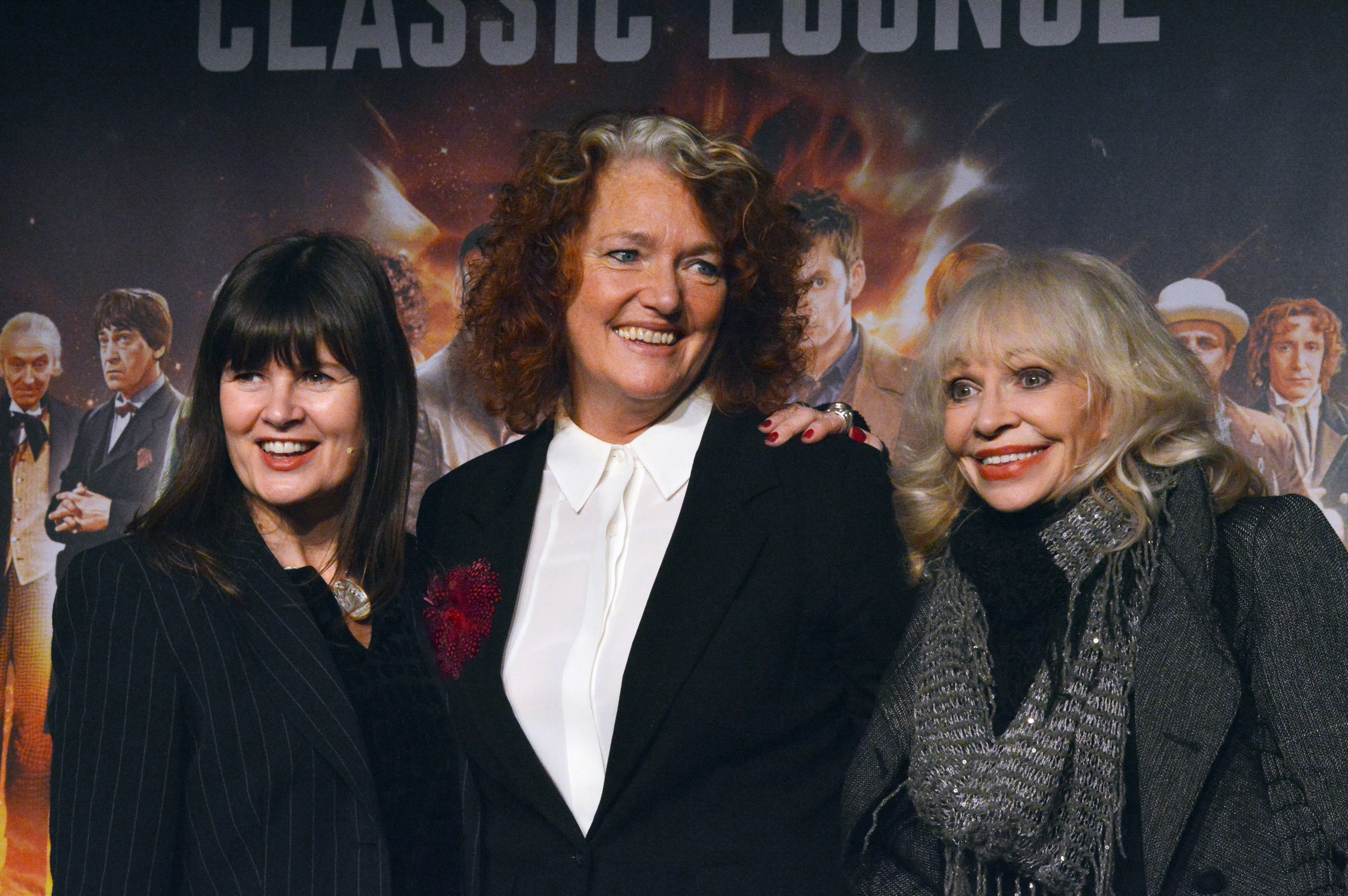
Sophie Aldred, Louise Jameson and Manning at the Doctor Who 50th Anniversary Celebration Weekend in 2013

In recent years, Manning has maintained her connection with Doctor Who. She voices Jo Grant in the audio adventures by Big Finish Productions. She is the voice of Iris Wildthyme, the Time Lord in several of their audio plays. She has contributed to a large number of documentaries and DVD commentaries detailing her time on Doctor Who.

She is involved with fan events and conventions, and she is the patron of the Doctor Who Club of Australia.

In 2022, Manning made a cameo appearance as Jo Grant in the Doctor Who special "The Power of the Doctor". She reprised the role again in the series Tales of the TARDIS.

=== After Doctor Who ===
Straight after leaving Doctor Who in 1973, Manning presented her own ten-part TV series for the BBC on crafts, entitled Serendipity shown in the daytime schedules. She then appeared as one of the first lesbians on television in an episode of Armchair Theatre before starring in her first film Don't Just Lie There, Say Something! (1974) alongside Leslie Phillips, Joan Sims and Joanna Lumley; the film was written by Pertwee's brother Michael. Manning followed this with a role in the comedy film Eskimo Nell (1975) as Rosalind Knight's rebellious daughter before she was reunited with Jon Pertwee when she appeared in Whodunnit? on ITV; at the time that Pertwee was chairing the panel. In 1976, Manning aroused controversy when she posed nude with a Dalek for the Girl Illustrated magazine. She responded to critics by saying "you'd need a magnifying glass to see anything". In 1977, she appeared topless as a drug addict in the hard-hitting crime drama Target with Patrick Mower. Manning starred with Sion Probert in a BBC Wales comedy pilot entitled How's Business? in 1979.

After leaving Doctor Who, Manning appeared predominantly on stage consistently. From 1973 to 1975, she appeared opposite Derek Nimmo in Why Not Stay For Breakfast? in the West End, as well as appearing in There's a Girl in My Soup with Gerald Flood. She then starred in the play French Without Tears in 1975 and So Who Needs Men with Peter Denyer and Jeff Rawle in 1976 before joining the Young Vic for a time in 1977 and taking part in many of Shakespeare's works including playing Ophelia in Hamlet. From 1977 to 1978, she toured in Doctor in the House, a production that also starred Jimmy Edwards, Bob Grant and future Doctor Who actor Colin Baker, before starring as Myra alongside Lionel Blair in The Monkey Walk in 1978. In 1978, she toured Rhodesia in a run of Bedroom Farce. From 1979 to 1980, Manning toured in the thriller play The Gentle Hook, then in 1980 toured in Peter Terson's VE Night alongside Ian Cullen and Jane Goddard before appearing on stage in Thark alongside Brian Murphy and Reginald Marsh in 1981.

=== Australia and the U.S. ===
After moving to Australia in 1982, she appeared as Mary Smith in the first run of the play Run for Your Wife with Bernard Cribbins before appearing in Otherwise Engaged opposite Martin Shaw in 1983, The Odd Couple with Jack Klugman in 1984 and then in another tour of Run for Your Wife from 1987 to 1988; other members of the cast in the production were Jack Smethurst, David McCallum and Eric Sykes. Manning appeared as Rita in Educating Rita from 1989 to 1991 at the Sydney Opera House, the venue at which she also played Elvira in Blithe Spirit in 1990. She also appeared in the films Melvin, Son of Alvin (1984) and Frog Dreaming (1986).

Manning wrote a comedy pilot entitled Two in the Bush in 1986 with her friend and fellow actress Penelope Whiteley. She also wrote the TV series Private Wives and has been involved in other writing and directing projects. Manning was also offered a role in popular Australian soap Home and Away but she had to turn it down due to busy work commitments. In 1993, she was reunited with Pertwee and Courtney for the first time since she emigrated to Australia at the PanoptiCon 93 event; their interview was filmed and released on DVD.

Some time between 1994 and 1996, Manning moved to live in Los Angeles where she shared a flat with her best friend Liza Minnelli and had large house parties that had guests including Sean Penn, Shirley MacLaine and Whoopi Goldberg. In 1996, Manning and Minnelli appeared drunk on Ruby Wax's television series Ruby Wax Meets... which has since gone on to become one of the most popular and well-known moments in the show's history. Wax's interview was initially to be with Minnelli but Manning appeared with her and spent most of the interview on the floor.

While living in the U.S., Manning and Minnelli started up a production company. It was living in L.A. that Manning started writing her first one-woman show called Not a Well Woman in which she portrays twenty-six characters all with different voices and some scenes depict several of these characters interacting with each other. Not a Well Woman's opening performance was in New York and Minnelli invited some top producers to watch the premiere including Blake Edwards. After the show, Edwards personally complimented Manning on her performance calling it "extraordinary". The show was only limited to a few shows as it started to take its toll on her. She later recorded an audio version of Not a Well Woman for Big Finish Productions in 2011, as part of their Drama Showcase anthology series.

By 1998, Manning had returned to Australia where she appeared as Dotty in a production of Noises Off before making a documentary for Reeltime Pictures called Where on Earth is Katy Manning? which is shown in a day-by-day format showing her time attending various fan conventions on a trip to the U.K. Manning was the voice of Australia's UKTV television channel in the late 1990s and provided voiceovers for the idents. She also hosted her own chat show from 2001 until 2008 called Preview with Katy Manning and had guests including Lenny Henry, Edgar Wright, Petula Clark and Basil Brush.

Manning also voiced characters for the animated films D4: The Trojan Dog (1999), Easter in Bunnyland (2000) and Jungle Girl and the Lost Island of Dinosaurs (2002) for Burbank Animation Studios. From 2000 to 2001, she voiced the main character Gloria in the Australian children's animated television series Gloria's House, amongst countless other animated films and television series. In 2002, Manning appeared in an episode of All Saints and also starred in a production of the Ray Cooney play It Runs in the Family with Robert Coleby and Judy Cornwell. Also in 2002, she released another documentary about her life for Reeltime Pictures as a sequel to Where on Earth is Katy Manning? called Katy Manning's Life Down Under showing her life in Australia. In 2003, Manning directed the original run of the musical play Eureka as well as other productions including Banjo Paterson and Shirley Valentine.

She also starred as Miss Harrington in the film noir When Darkness Falls (2006) directed by Australian filmmaker Rohan Spong; a role for which she would win Best Supporting Actress at the Melbourne Underground Film Festival. In June and July 2007, she appeared as Yvette in the stage show 'Allo 'Allo! alongside Gorden Kaye as René Artois at Twelfth Night Theatre in Brisbane as original actress Vicki Michelle was unavailable. Guy Siner and Sue Hodge also reprised their original roles from the television series, and the other characters were portrayed by Australian television actors including Steven Tandy and Jason Gann.

In 2009, Manning returned to the UK as part of her one-woman show Me and Jezebel. The play was based on a true 1985 story about Bette Davis inviting herself to a fan's house for a night and staying for a month, with Manning playing all the parts. It toured through March and April in England and also played at the 2009 Edinburgh Fringe at The Gilded Balloon Wine Bar in August. The show received a five-star review in the Edinburgh Evening News, which described her as "one of Britain's best actresses". She also received two other four-star reviews and appeared on STV news promoting the show.

=== Return to the UK ===
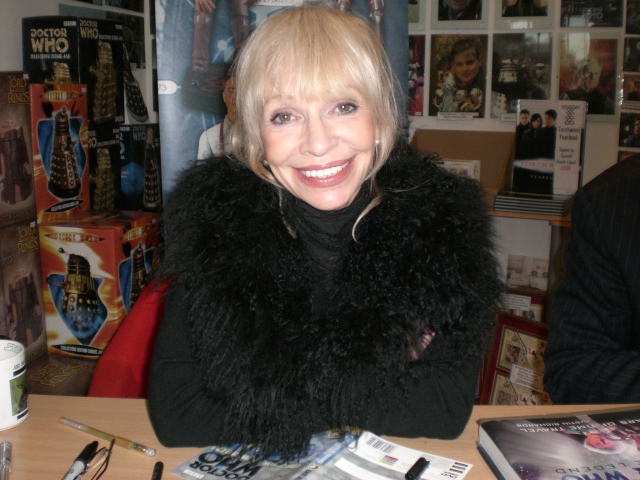
Manning at The Television & Movie Store, Norwich in 2009

Manning moved back to live in the UK in 2009. In October 2010, she reprised her role as Jo Jones (née Grant) in the fourth series of the Doctor Who spin-off The Sarah Jane Adventures with Matt Smith as the Eleventh Doctor. The two-part story, entitled 'Death of the Doctor', was written by then-executive producer of the programme Russell T Davies. She meets the Doctor again, and stars with her grandson Santiago Jones. In 2011, Manning appeared as Blodwyn Morgan, a Welsh busybody and clairvoyant, in the touring stage play Death by Fatal Murder. This was a Peter Gordon play, and part of the Inspector Pratt trilogy. Manning, among many other well-known actors, had a cameo in the comedy film Run for Your Wife in 2012. In November 2013 she appeared as a fictionalised version of herself in the Doctor Who one-off 50th anniversary comedy homage The Five(ish) Doctors Reboot.

She returned to the Edinburgh Fringe in 2014 in the play Keeping Up with the Joans with Susan Penhaligon. The play also toured to The Customs House, South Shields & Greenwich Theatre London. She also appeared as Susan Payne in the 2014 supernatural gangster film Evil Never Dies (originally titled The Haunting of Harry Payne) starring Tony Scannell and Graham Cole. In 2015, Manning appeared in an episode of Casualty. From 2016 to 2017, she played Suzy alongside Tom Baker in the audio sitcom Baker's End about life in a fictional rural village. She also starred in the short films Memoria (2017) and The Power of One Coin and provided her voice for two Doctor Who video games.

In 2019, 2020 and 2023, Manning reprised her role of Jo Jones for three specially filmed scenes to promote three Doctor Who blu-ray box sets for her three seasons on the programme. She also starred in a special episode to mark the conclusion of The Sarah Jane Adventures, released via YouTube in 2020 on the anniversary of Elisabeth Sladen's death.

== Personal life ==
Manning was born with myopia, commonly known as nearsightedness or shortsightedness, which caused numerous injuries during the filming of Doctor Who. She has stated, "Once I tried to take the wrong children home from school!"

Manning dated Jimi Hendrix in the 1960s. She also dated Richard Eyre, David Troughton, Derek Fowlds, Stewart Bevan and Rod Stewart’s keyboard player Peter Bardens. Manning once told of how she was dropped off for her first day at drama school in a black Cadillac with her boyfriend Bardens and his Shotgun Express bandmates including Stewart.

Manning has twins (a son Jonathan and a daughter Georgina) born in 1978 with partner Dean Harris. The children were born two months premature and had to spend the first five months of their lives in incubators which meant she could not touch or hold them. Manning said of how she would perform on stage during the day and then sleep in the hospital at night. Still frail as toddlers, they continued to suffer from severe health issues, including from whooping cough which made their immune systems collapse. By this time, Manning had separated from Harris and doctors advised her that a warmer climate would help the twins' health, so she moved to Manly, New South Wales, Australia where she met Barry Crocker, who has been her partner since 1990.

In a 2012 Radio Times interview, Manning said she had returned to London three years earlier, although there was no mention of any break-up in their relationship, and she referred to Crocker as her "current partner" in a 2017 interview with the Daily Express:

We've been together 26 years although we don't live together now. When you get older, you get to a point in your relationship that way outweighs all that needy s**t. I'm not a needy woman. I don't rely on other people for anything much. Relationships that last are ones where you accept the changes in each other, and can laugh. Life doesn't get easier but it does get funnier.

== Filmography ==
=== Film ===
Year	Title	Role	Notes
1974	Don't Just Lie There, Say Something!	Damina	
1975	Eskimo Nell	Hermione	
1984	Melvin, Son of Alvin	Estelle	Feature film, Australia
1985	Frog Dreaming	Mrs. Cannon	Feature film, Australia
1998	Lust in Space	Katy Manning	
1999	D4: The Trojan Dog	Cosmo Mouse	Voice
2000	Easter in Bunnyland	Bitsy Bunny	Voice
2002	Jungle Girl and the Lost Island of the Dinosaurs	Emma	Voice
2006	When Darkness Falls	Miss Harrington	
2011	Oakie's Outback Adventures	Oakie	Voice
2012	Run for Your Wife	Exercising woman	Cameo
2012	Journey Men	Elsa	Short film
2013	Dreadnought: Invasion Six	Dr. Kassi Sharda	Voice
2014	Evil Never Dies	Susan Payne	
2017	Memoria	Lorraine	Short film
2018	The Power of One Coin	Cassie	Short film
2024	Elixir	Shirley Maiden	Short film

=== Television ===
Year	Title	Role	Notes
1970	Softly, Softly: Task Force	Peggy	Episode: "Standing Orders"
1971	Man at the Top	Julia Dungarvon	2 episodes
1971	Mr. Tumbleweed	Bride	TV film
1971–1973, 2022	Doctor Who	Jo Grant	78 episodes
1973	Armchair Theatre	Anna	Episode: "The Golden Road"
1975	Whodunnit?	Miss Woods	Episode: "Worth Dying For"
1977	Target	Joanne	Episode: "Big Elephant"
1979	How's Business?	Main role	TV pilot
1980	Theatre in Camera	Peg	Episode: "V. E. Night"
1986	Two in the Bush	Main role	TV pilot; also writer
1988	Private Wives	Main role	Also writer
1992	The Miraculous Mellops	Window Guru	2 episodes
1996	A Bush Christmas	Main role	TV film
2000–2001	Gloria's House	Gloria	Voice; all 25 episodes
2002	All Saints	Greta Franck	Episode: "Pride and Prejudice"
2010	The Sarah Jane Adventures	Jo Jones	Serial: Death of the Doctor
2011	Three Score and Then?	Annie	TV pilot
2013	The Five(ish) Doctors Reboot	Katy Manning	TV film
2015	Casualty	Marjorie Miller	Episode: "Sweet Little Lies"
2016	Prisoner Zero	Professor Daro	Voice; 2 episodes
2020	Gentrification	Maggie	Episode: "Part Six"
2022	Henry House	Daphne Powers	TV pilot
2023	Tales of the TARDIS	Jo Jones	Episode: "The Three Doctors"

=== Video games ===
Year	Title	Role	Notes
2018	Doctor Who Infinity: The Orphans of the Polyoptra	Jo Grant	Voice
2018	Doctor Who Infinity: The Lady of the Lake	Delyth	Voice

=== Music videos ===
Year	Artist	Title	Role
2013	Six Years	Journey Men	Elsa

== Theatre ==
(incomplete)

Year	Title	Role	Venue
1973	Union Jack (and Bonzo)	Rosie Makron	Edinburgh Fringe Festival, Edinburgh
1973–1975	Why Not Stay for Breakfast?	Louise Hamilton	Apollo Theatre, West End, London
1975–1976	There's a Girl in My Soup	Marion	UK Tour
1975	French Without Tears	Diana Lake	Liverpool Playhouse, Liverpool
1975	The Peter Pan Man		
1976	So Who Needs Men?	Marsha	London Tour
1977	Natural Gas	Deirdre	UK Tour
1977	Hamlet	Ophelia	Young Vic, London
1977	The Real Inspector Hound	Felicity	Young Vic, London
1977	Rosencrantz and Guildenstern Are Dead		Young Vic, London
1977	If You’re Glad, I’ll Be Frank		Young Vic, London
1977–1978	Doctor in the House	Vera	UK Tour
1978	See How They Run	Penelope Toop	
1978	The Monkey Walk	Myra	The Alexandra, Birmingham
1978	Bedroom Farce		Rhodesia Tour
1979	Odd Man In	Jane Maxwell	The Alexandra, Birmingham
1979	Duet For Three	Pam	Dolphin and Anchor Studio Theatre, Chichester
1979	Doctor in the House	Vera	Pavilion Theatre, Weymouth
1979–1980	The Gentle Hook	Stacey Harrison	UK Tour
1980	Out of the Blue		College Theatre, Chichester
1980	V E Night	Peg	UK Tour
1981	Thark	Cherry Buck	UK Tour
1983	Run for Your Wife	Mary Smith	The Playhouse, Adelaide, Australia
1983	Otherwise Engaged	Davina Saunders	Regal Theatre, Subiaco, Australia
1984	The Odd Couple	Cecily	Her Majesty's Theatre, Melbourne, Australia
1985	Run for Your Wife	Mary Smith	The Playhouse, Adelaide, Australia
1986	Otherwise Engaged	Davina Saunders	Marian Street Theatre, Killara, Australia
1987–1988	Run for Your Wife	Mary Smith	Criterion Theatre, West End, London
1988	Mother's Day	Barbara	Australia
1989–1990	Educating Rita	Rita	Australia Tour
1990	How the Other Half Loves	Teresa	Queensland Tour, Australia
1990	Blithe Spirit	Elvira	Australia Tour
1990	Blithe Spirit	Elvira	Sydney Opera House, Sydney, Australia
1991	Educating Rita	Rita	Sydney Opera House, Sydney, Australia
1991	Educating Rita	Rita	Australia Tour
1993	Hot Taps	Marjorie	Riverside Theatres, Parramatta, Australia
1993	The Removalists		Lennox Theatre, Parramatta, Australia
1994	Don't Dress for Dinner	Suzette	Australia
1997	Gone to Bali		Australia
1998	Noises Off	Dotty	Australia Tour
1998	Not A Well Woman	All Characters	Tavern on the Green, New York, U.S.
2000	Later than Spring	Olivia	Marian Street Theatre, Killara, Australia
2002	The Slippery Slope		Judith Wright Centre of Contemporary Arts, Australia
2002	It Runs in the Family	Jane Tate	Twelfth Night Theatre, Bowen Hills, Brisbane, Australia
2007	'Allo 'Allo!	Yvette Carte-Blanche	Twelfth Night Theatre, Bowen Hills, Brisbane, Australia
2009	Me and Jezebel	Bette Davis/All parts	Australia Tour then UK Tour
2011–2012	Death by Fatal Murder	Blodwyn Morgan	UK Tour
2012	You're Only Young Twice	Rose	UK Tour
2013	A Murder is Announced	Letitia Blacklock	UK Tour
2013	Murder in Play	Christa D'amato	Grand Theatre, Wolverhampton
2013	Keeping up with the Joans	Kitty	Greenwich Theatre, London
2014	Keeping up with the Joans	Kitty	Edinburgh Fringe Festival, Edinburgh
2015	Nobody's Business	Sybil	King's Head Theatre, London

=== As director ===
Year	Title	Venue
2003	Eureka	Queensland Tour, Australia
2003	Barry Crocker's Banjo Paterson	Twelfth Night Theatre, Bowen Hills, Brisbane, Australia
	Shirley Valentine	Australia
