= Serendip =

Serendip may refer to:

- Serendip (Persian) or Serendib (Arabic); historical name for Sri Lanka, from Sanskrit, Siṃhaladvīpaḥ.
- SERENDIP, a SETI program at UC Berkeley
- Serendip Sanctuary, a protected area for wildlife in Victoria, Australia
- The Three Princes of Serendip, an old Persian fairy tale

== See also ==
- Serendipity (disambiguation)
