= Graham Cole =

English actor (born 1952)

Graham Cole OBE
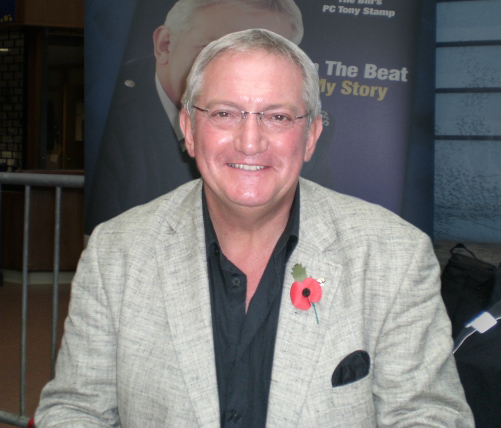
- Cole at the 3rd Norwich Sci-Fi Film, Comic, Toy & Collectors Fair on 1 November 2009.
- Born: Graham Coleman-Smith; 16 March 1952 (age 74); Willesden, Middlesex, England
- Occupation: Actor
- Years active: 1976–present
- Spouse: Cherry Coleman-Smith (m. 1983)
- Children: 2

Graham Cole OBE (born Graham Coleman-Smith on 16 March 1952) is an English actor. He is best known for playing PC Tony Stamp in the long-running police drama The Bill from 1984 to 2009.

== Early life ==
Cole was born in Willesden, Middlesex in 1952 to Victor and Freda Coleman-Smith (née Coleman), the youngest of three children.

== Career ==
He appeared in numerous episodes of Doctor Who in the early 1980s, often in uncredited roles, such as Marshman and then a Cyberman in Earthshock. He has also played Melkur in The Keeper of Traken and finally a Jacondan in The Twin Dilemma. He also made a guest appearance in the final series of Sooty and Co as a detective called Maurice and in Only Fools and Horses as a Spanish customs official. His first film appearance was in the James Bond film The Living Daylights in 1987. Cole then appeared in Indiana Jones and the Last Crusade as one of Walter Donovan's henchmen, who escort Indiana Jones to their boss's New York apartment.

He is best known as PC Tony Stamp in the ITV police drama The Bill, a role he played initially as a recurring character from 1984, and then as a regular from 1988 until 2009. Cole appeared in more episodes of the programme than any other actor, appearing in 1,202 episodes. He had previously spent 12 years in Repertory Theatre, and musicals.

He presented and narrated the police video programme Police Stop!. He appeared regularly on Noel's House Party in sketches with Andrew Paul. Cole has also made a guest appearance in ITV series Law & Order: UK as a barman in one episode.

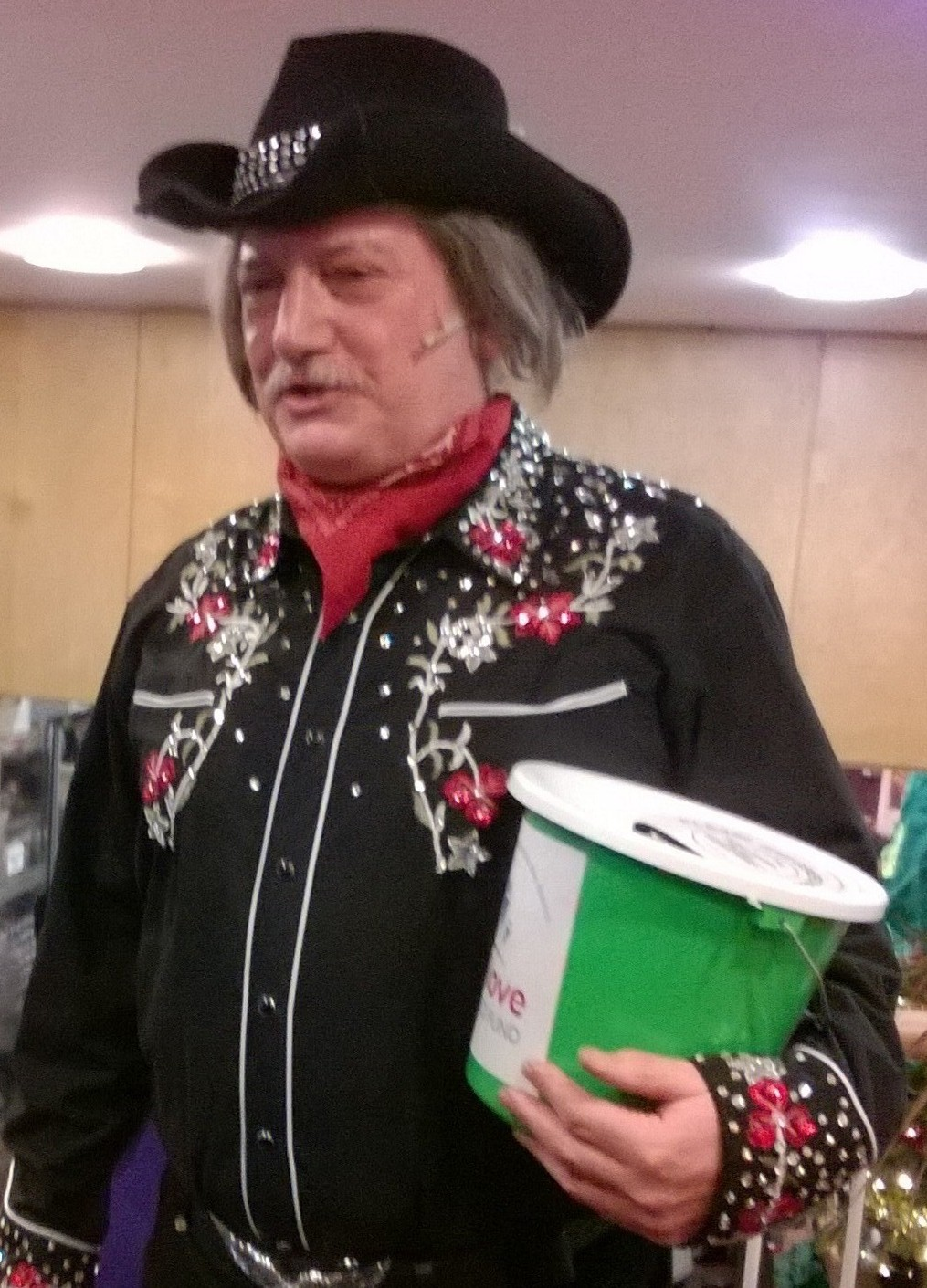
Cole in costume after appearing in a pantomime in Lichfield in 2015

In his early career in the late 1970s Cole appeared as the Emperor of China in a season of Aladdin at the Grand Theatre in Swansea. Other pantomime appearances have included the role of "Beast" in Beauty & The Beast at the Woodville Halls in Gravesend, Kent. He played Scrooge at Garrick Theatre, Lichfield in 2012 and Abanazer for Theatre Royal, Norwich, 2013–2014. He played General Waverley in Irving Berlin's White Christmas at The Festival Theatre, Edinburgh. He later returned to the role at The Dominion Theatre, London.

Cole starred in the gangster-horror film Evil Never Dies in 2014, as DI David Bracken, a film that also starred Katy Manning, P.H. Moriarty and former The Bill colleague Tony Scannell. Cole made appearances in Doctors (2015) and Holby City (2018), before starring in the romantic-drama film 23 Walks in 2020 with Alison Steadman.

== Personal life ==
Cole is a member of the showbusiness charity the Grand Order of Water Rats and held the title King Rat in 2009. He is President of the National Holiday Fund, which takes sick and disabled children to Disney World in Florida. He has been a patron of ChildLine for over 25 years and is the president of Greater London South East Scout County.

Cole supports emergency service charities with his patronage. He is a patron of the Orphans' Gift Fund South East London Boroughs of the Constables Branch Board of the Metropolitan Police. He is a Voluntary Police Cadets ambassador.

He was the subject of This Is Your Life in 1997 when he was surprised by Michael Aspel.

Cole was awarded an OBE in 2010 for his continuing work with charities. He is married and has two children.

== Filmography ==
=== Film ===
Year	Title	Role	Notes
1987	The Living Daylights	Agent	Uncredited
1987	Hope and Glory	Audience Member	Uncredited
1989	Indiana Jones and the Last Crusade	Henchman	Uncredited
1997	The Usual Children	Dad	
2010	Derelict	Tarsus	Short film
2014	Evil Never Dies	DI David Bracken	
2016	Zunz	Melville	Short film
2020	23 Walks	Jimmy	
2022	Broken Glass	Tom	Short film

=== Television ===
Year	Title	Role	Notes
1976	The Canal Children	Mick Murphy	Episode: "Poor Man's Morris"
1979	Secret Army	German soldier in cafe Guerilla (uncredited)	2 episodes
1980	Citizen Smith	Uncredited	Episode: "Prisoners"
1981	Kessler	Hotel surveillance man	
1981	Blake's 7	Federation Trooper Gerren's Associate	2 episodes
1982	Smiley's People	Agent in office (uncredited)	Episode: "A Mother's Assistance"
1982	Only Fools and Horses	Customers Officer	Episode: "It Never Rains..."
1983	Rumpole of the Bailey	Pressman (uncredited)	Episode: "Rumpole and the Old Boy Net"
1984	Tucker's Luck	2nd Policeman	Episode: "The Hump"
1984	Minder	Party Guest (uncredited)	Episode: "A Well Fashioned Fit-Up"
1980–1984	Doctor Who	Various	9 serials
1984	Fresh Fields	Mr. Winter (uncredited)	Episode: "Something in the Oven"
1984	The Young Ones	Ghost Body (uncredited)	Episode: "Cash"
1982–1984	The Gentle Touch	Detective Gay Vigilante (uncredited)	2 episodes
1986	Casualty	Junior Doctor	Episode: "Gas"
1982–1987	The Kenny Everett Television Show	Bus Passenger	2 episodes
1988	Crossfire	Terrorist (uncredited)	Episode: "The Motive, Not the Deed"
1988	Hot Metal	Crucible employee (uncredited)	Episode: "Crown of Thorns"
1998	Sooty & Co.	Maurice	Episode: "Delgrub"
1992–1999	Noel's House Party	Man at the Door	7 episodes
2001	Sooty	Police Detective	
2004	The Bill @ 21	PC Tony Stamp	Television film A two day event to celebrate the 21st anniversary of the series, including episodes, clips and specially filmed intros by past and present cast members
2007	The Dame Edna Treatment	PC Tony Stamp	Episode: #1.6
1984–2009	The Bill	PC Tony Stamp	1,206 episodes
2012	Doctor Who: The Lost Stories	Ebbko	Episode: "The Guardians of Prophecy"
2014	Law & Order: UK	Terry Wilson	Episode: "I Predict a Riot"
2015	Doctors	Callum Jenkins	Episode: "The Key"
2018	Holby City	Larry O'Shea	Episode: "There by the Grace of..."
2021	The Lives of Frankie Abbott	Charlie	2 episodes
