= Brian Manning =

Brian Manning may refer to:

- Brian Manning (American football) (born 1975), American football wide receiver
- Brian Manning (historian) (1927–2004), British historian
- Brian Manning (politician), Trinidadian politician
- Brian Manning (trade unionist and activist) (1932–2013), Australian activist
- Brian G. W. Manning (1926–2011), British astronomer
