= The Three Musketeers (1966 TV series) =

British television series

The Three Musketeers is a 1966 British television series based on the 1844 novel The Three Musketeers. It was a serial on the BBC. The series was directed by Peter Hammond and produced by William Sterling.

The serial is fully intact and was released on DVD in 2006.

== Cast ==
- Jeremy Brett as D'Artagnan
- Brian Blessed as Porthos
- Jeremy Young as Athos
- Gary Watson as Aramis
- Mary Peach as Milady de Winter
- Richard Pasco as Cardinal Richelieu
- Edward Brayshaw as Rochefort
- Billy Hamon as Planchet
- Milton Johns as Grimaud
- Kathleen Breck as Madame Constance Bonacieux
- Michael Miller as M. de Treville
- Simon Oates as Duke of Buckingham
- Carole Potter as Anne of Austria

== The Further Adventures of the Musketeers ==
It was followed by a sequel series The Further Adventures of the Musketeers.

=== Cast ===
- Joss Ackland as d'Artagnan
- Brian Blessed as Porthos
- William Dexter as Cardinal Mazarin
- John Woodvine as Aramis
- Jeremy Young as Athos
- Carole Potter as Queen Anne
- Louis Selwyn as King Louis XIV
- Edward Brayshaw as Rochefort
- Michael Gothard as Mordaunt
- Charles Carson as Broussel
- David Garth as Charles I
- Geoffrey Palmer as Oliver Cromwell
- Jennifer Jayne as Madeleine
- John Quentin as Duke of Beaufort
- Peter Bennett as Bernouin
- Nigel Lambert as Planchet
- Fergus McClelland as Raoul De Bragelonne
