= All the Way Through Evening =

2012 film by Rohan Spong

- Theatrical release poster
- Directed by: Rohan Spong
- Written by: Rohan Spong
- Produced by: Adam Farrington-Williams; Rohan Spong; Duncan Hewitt; Brad Heard
- Starring: Mimi Stern-Wolfe
- Cinematography: Rohan Spong
- Edited by: Rohan Spong
- Music by: Robert Savage
- Release dates: December 1, 2011 (New York premiere); November 29, 2012 (Australia)
- Running time: 70 minutes
- Country: USA / Australia
- Language: English

All the Way Through Evening is a 2011 documentary film that chronicles pianist and concert producer Mimi Stern-Wolfe as she prepares for her annual concert of music written by New York City composers lost to HIV/AIDS. Dubbed The Benson AIDS Series (after her friend and longtime collaborator Eric Benson), Stern-Wolfe's concert contains music that recalls the arrival of HIV/AIDS and the devastation left in its wake.

Directed and photographed by Australian Rohan Spong, the film follows Stern-Wolfe as she engages various players to rehearse and perform the musical works of late playwright Robert Chesley and posthumously recognized composers Kevin Oldham, and Chris DeBlasio. The film includes the latter's seminal piece 'Walt Whitman in 1989', with a libretto by Perry Brass, which imagines the great American poet Walt Whitman surveying the Lenox Hill Hospital amidst the peak of the HIV/AIDS crisis in New York City. Interspersed amongst Stern-Wolfe's preparations and performances are interviews with the composer's friends, family, lovers, and collaborators.

== Production ==
The film was shot single-handedly by Spong over two months The film contains excerpts from the 20th edition of Stern-Wolfe's concert series, which was held on World AIDS Day in 2010 at St. Mark's Church in-the-Bowery. It also contains archive footage of the initial concert in 1990 which was held at Middle Collegiate Church.

== Release ==
The film was programmed at a number of film festivals during 2012, notably as the Closing Night Film of the 20th GAZE film festival in Dublin.

All The Way Through Evening was theatrically released in Australian cinemas on 29 November 2012. Despite only expecting to run for a week in each city, the film ran for a total of thirteen weeks at Melbourne's Cinema Nova, outlasting a number of big-budget films and finally closing in late February 2013.

All The Way Through Evening opened theatrically in New York City at the Village East Cinema, on 6 December 2013.

The film was invited to screen at The Library of Congress in Washington, D.C., on 25 June 2014. Spong and the film's main subject, Mimi Stern-Wolfe attended this screening.

The film has since been programmed at the ACMI and the Boston Museum of Fine Art.

The film has since been broadcast on Australia's SBS, Foxtel, and streamed via various video on demand services.

== Reception ==
All The Way Through Evening received numerous positive reviews and four-star ratings upon its Australian theatrical release.

Phillipa Hawker of The Age newspaper described the film as: "A graceful story of music and memory", rating the film four stars.

Don Groves of SBS marveled at Spong's ability to single-handedly bring the story to cinema: "Multi-tasking as director, producer, cinematographer and editor, Spong has crafted a handsome-looking production despite working on a frugal budget. It’s an impressive effort" and also gave the film four stars.

Richard Watts of Artshub also gave the film four stars and named it amongst his most favorite films of the year, describing it as: "an important film, and a beautiful one."

Australian magazine FilmInk called the film as "an incredibly affecting and important piece of cinema".

All The Way Through Evening was nominated for the Australian Film Critic's Association Award for Best Documentary of 2012 but ultimately lost to Searching for Sugar Man.
