= Little Ashes =

2008 Spanish-British drama film

- Theatrical release poster
- Directed by: Paul Morrison
- Written by: Philippa Goslett
- Produced by: Carlo Dusi; Jonny Persey; Jaume Vilalta
- Starring: Robert Pattinson; Javier Beltrán; Matthew McNulty; Marina Gatell
- Cinematography: Adam Suschitzky
- Edited by: Rachel Tunnard; Samantha Patterine
- Music by: Miguel Mera
- Production companies: PT Films; Aria Films; Factotum Barcelona S.L. Met Film Production; Met Film
- Distributed by: SOROlla Films (Spain); Kaleidoscope Entertainment (UK)
- Release dates: 7 October 2008 (Raindance Film Festival); 8 May 2009
- Running time: 107 minutes
- Countries: United Kingdom; Spain
- Language: English
- Budget: $2.9 million
- Box office: $767,567

Little Ashes is a 2008 Spanish-British drama film directed by Paul Morrison and written by Philippa Goslett. It is set in Spain during the 1920s and 1930s, where three of the era's most creative talents meet at university. Luis Buñuel, later a noted filmmaker, is dismayed as his friends, surrealist painter Salvador Dalí and poet Federico García Lorca, develop a love affair.

Little Ashes won the GLAAD Media Award for "Outstanding Film−Limited Release" during the 21st GLAAD Media Awards.

== Plot ==
In 1922, 18-year-old Salvador Dalí (Robert Pattinson) arrives at art school in Madrid. The Residencia de Estudiantes, or Students' Residence, is a modern environment which encourages Spain's brightest young minds. Salvador, who is determined to become a great artist, soon catches the attention of the Resi's social elite — poet Federico García Lorca (Javier Beltrán) and aspiring filmmaker Luis Buñuel (Matthew McNulty). Together, they form the nucleus of the most modern artist group in Madrid.

Their private lives become increasingly complex, as Federico ignores the advances of devoted friend and writer Magdalena (Marina Gatell), and Salvador also feels the pull of Federico's magnetism. Luis, becoming increasingly isolated by the duo's closeness, decides to move to Paris to fulfill his own artistic ambitions. Meanwhile, Salvador and Federico leave Madrid to spend the summer at the seaside village of Cadaqués, at the home of Dalí's family.

Federico finds himself accepted into the Dalí family as he and Salvador grow closer. One night their friendship becomes romantic. Even as they draw closer, their relationship appears doomed. Luis visits them at university and becomes more suspicious and appalled by their apparent intimacy.

Salvador finds Federico's obsession more than he is prepared to handle, and eventually also leaves for Paris. Enveloped by the high society and decadence there, Salvador is soon entangled with Gala (Arly Jover), a married woman with a penchant for celebrities. When Federico visits, he finds his friend is a changed man, both in his life and his politics.

== Background ==
Details of the relationship between Salvador Dalí and Federico García Lorca have long been the subject of speculation and debate among historians and biographers. In Little Ashes, Dalí's and Lorca's feelings are shown deepening into a love affair that the sexually repressed painter tries (but fails) to consummate.

Between 1925 and 1936, during the course of their friendship, Dalí and Lorca exchanged numerous letters. The original manuscripts of Dalí's letters to Lorca are held by the Fundación Federico García Lorca in Madrid, and those of Lorca to Dalí are held by Fundación Gala-Salvador Dalí in Púbol, as well as in private collections. While it is widely acknowledged that Lorca was infatuated with Dalí, for years the painter denied entering into a relationship with Lorca.

Dalí said about Lorca:

He was homosexual, as everyone knows, and madly in love with me. He tried to screw me twice .... I was extremely annoyed, because I wasn't homosexual, and I wasn't interested in giving in. Besides, it hurts. So nothing came of it. But I felt awfully flattered vis-à-vis the prestige. Deep down I felt that he was a great poet and that I owe him a tiny bit of the Divine Dalí's asshole. He eventually bagged a young girl, and she replaced me in the sacrifice. Failing to get me to put my ass at his disposal, he swore that the girl's sacrifice was matched by his own: it was the first time he had ever slept with a woman.

The film's writer Philippa Goslett supposes:

It's clear something happened, no question... When you look at the letters it's clear something more was going on there[...] It began as a friendship, became more intimate and moved to a physical level but Dalí found it difficult and couldn't carry on. He said they tried to have sex but it hurt, so they couldn't consummate the relationship.

Ian Gibson, biographer of both Dalí and Lorca, said:

It depends on how you define an affair, he [Dalí] was terrified of being touched by anyone, so I don't think Lorca got far.

In the repressed Spain of the mid 1930s, Lorca's homosexuality seems to have provided an additional thrill to those who assassinated him in 1936. Lorca's biographer Leslie Stainton has suggested that the killers made remarks about his sexual orientation.

== Cast ==
- Robert Pattinson as Salvador Dalí
- Javier Beltrán as Federico García Lorca
- Matthew McNulty as Luis Buñuel
- Marina Gatell as Magdalena
- Bruno Oro as Paco
- Esther Nubiola as Adela
- Marc Pujol as Carlos
- Arly Jover as Gala Dalí
- Simón Andreu as Fernando del Valle
- Vicky Peña as Magdalena's aunt
- Rubén Arroyo as Rafael
- Diana Gómez as Ana María
- Pep Sais as Art Teacher
- Joan Picó as Young Officer
- Ferran Audí as Guard 1
- Adría Allué as Guard 2
- Ferran Lahoz as Señor Milagro
- Cristian Rodrigo as Young Journalist
- Sue Flack as Madam
- Adrian Devant as Puppeteer
- Ramón Enrich as Professor
- Xavi Siles as Man 1
- Philippa Goslett and Hannah Rũtzou as Federico's Sisters
- Paco Alonso as Gypsy Singer

== Production ==
The title is taken from Salvador Dalí's 1927–28 painting Cenicitas (Little Ashes). It was originally called The Birth of Venus, before being changed to Sterile Efforts and then finally Cenicitas. It was first displayed on 20 March 1929 in a Madrid exhibition. It was again displayed in his first solo exhibition in Paris in June 1931. The painting is in the Dalí collection of the Museo Nacional Centro de Arte Reina Sofía in Madrid.

== Release ==
Little Ashes premiered at the 16th annual Raindance Film Festival in London. The sold-out screening was scheduled on 7 October 2008 at 19:00, and a second screening was added for 8 October at 14:30. Little Ashes premiered in the US at the Miami Gay & Lesbian film festival in Florida. On 8 May 2009 it premiered in 11 US locations.

The UK DVD was released on 13 July 2009 and is rated 15. The US DVD was released on 26 January 2010.

== Critical reception ==
The film holds a "Rotten" rating of 24% based on 70 reviews, with an average rating of 4.2 out of 10 on the film review aggregator Rotten Tomatoes. The site's critic consensus states, "It has a beautiful cast, but Little Ashes suffers from an uneven tone and a surplus of unintentionally silly moments."

Ty Burr of the Boston Globe panned the film and wrote: "What's intended to be a daring look at repressed sexuality, three-ways and all, has the dramatic heft of a true-love comic book".

Greg Quill of the Toronto Star wrote: "Even cinematographer Adam Suschitzky's richly textured and resonantly toned cityscapes and rural scenes can't make up for a flawed script and weak performances in what might have been a powerful historical drama".

Chris Hewitt of the St. Paul Pioneer Press commented that: "The movie, with its badly painted backdrops, its stiff acting and its complete lack of dramatic momentum, is embarrassing to watch".

But, Steven Rea of the Philadelphia Inquirer gave the film a positive review by calling it: "A bravely earnest and gauzy bit of biography".
