= Evil Never Dies (film) =

2014 film by Martyn Pick

- Film poster
- Directed by: Martyn Pick
- Written by: John Mangan
- Produced by: Paul Desira; Martin Faulks
- Starring: Tony Scannell; Graham Cole; Katy Manning; P. H. Moriarty
- Cinematography: Andy Parsons
- Production company: Eq Films
- Release date: 13 January 2014
- Running time: 73 minutes
- Country: United Kingdom
- Language: English

Evil Never Dies is a 2014 gangster-horror film written by John Mangan and directed by Martyn Pick, that was originally titled The Haunting of Harry Payne. It stars Tony Scannell, Graham Cole and Katy Manning.

== Cast ==
- Tony Scannell as Harry Payne
- Graham Cole as DI David Bracken
- Katy Manning as Susan Payne
- P.H. Moriarty as Eugene McCann
- Anouska Mond as Angela
- Fliss Walton as DS Belinda Churchill
- Neil Maskell as Sean McCann
- Michael Aston as Charles Drexler
- Peter Barfield as PC Melvyn Mervin
- Judi Daykin as Mother
- John Mangan as Tark
- Louis Selwyn as Gordon

== Release ==
The film was released on 13 January 2014.

== Reception ==
Critics praised the effects and actors' performances, Scannell's in particular, although others thought the film was too complicated and serious. Other criticisms were that the film was "genre bending" and confused.
