= Javier Beltrán =

Spanish actor

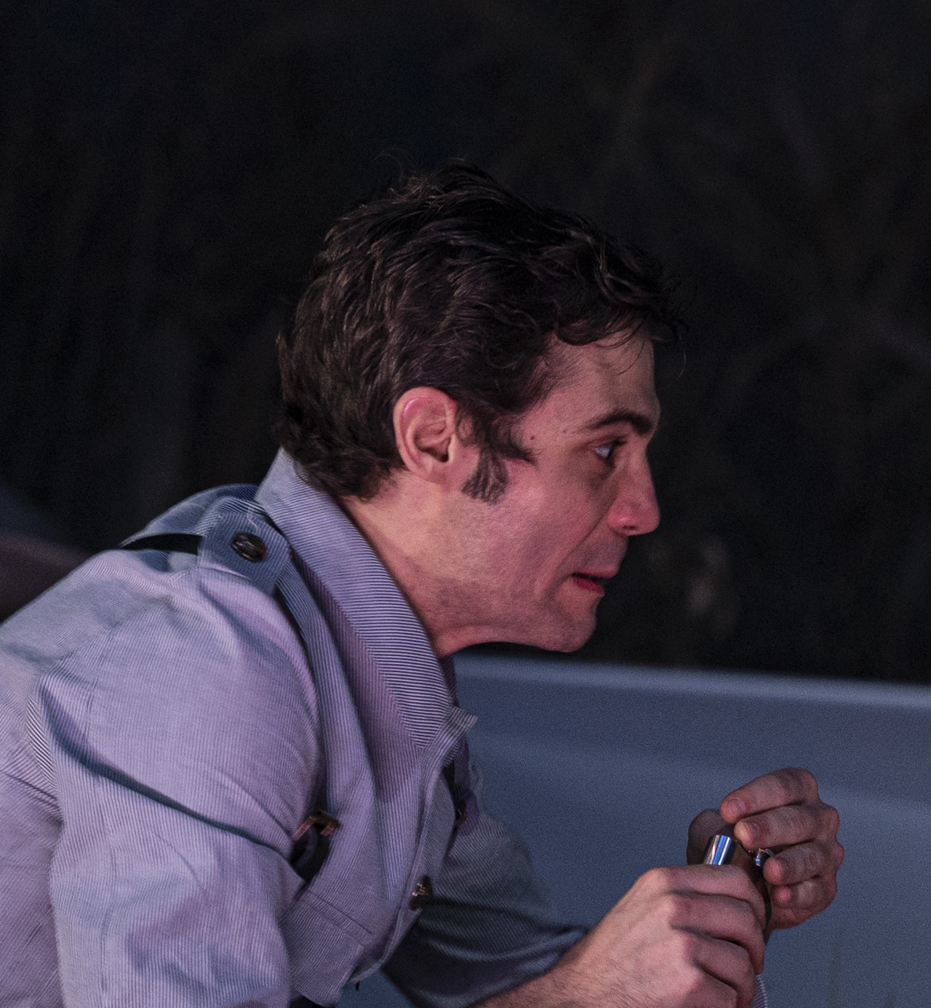
Javier Beltrán

Javier Beltrán Andreu (born 18 May 1983 in Barcelona, Spain) is a Spanish film and theatre actor.

Beltrán pursued his studies in Barcelona, which included a four-year humanities course at Pompeu Fabra University. He later studied dramatic arts, dance-theatre course (with Montserrat Prats) and acting (with Raimón Molins). He also had a short radio course with Radio Estudi Esplugues.

Beltrán has been involved with plays such as Alan Bennett's History Boys, and with Little Ashes which went from the stage to the big screen. It was his first film, and he was cast directly from college.

== Filmography ==
- Little Ashes (2009: director Paul Morrison) "Federico García Lorca"

== Short films ==
- El paso (2007: director Daniel Torres)
- Mònica (2007: director David Vicotri)
- Connecting People (2007: director Albert Bernard)
- Die Trane (2007)
- Fase Rem (2007)
- Camas (2007)
- Abanicos (2006: director Pau Bacardit)
- Lea (2005)
- Vidas perdidas ("Lost Lives") (2004)

== TV ==
- Zoo (2008: director Jesús Segura) "Pep"
- What the Future Holds (TV series) (2018: director Mariano Barroso) "Xavi Castellnou"
