= Coral Atkins =

British actress (1936–2016)

- Born: Coral Rosemary Atkins; 13 September 1936; Richmond upon Thames, Surrey, England
- Died: 2 December 2016 (aged 80); Thatcham, Berkshire, England
- Occupation: Actress
- Known for: Opened and ran a home for disadvantaged children
- Notable work: Emmerdale; A Family at War
- Spouse: Jeremy Young (m. 1960–1960)
- Children: 1

Coral Rosemary Atkins (13 September 1936 – 2 December 2016) was an English actress, who opened and ran a home for disadvantaged children. She cared for 37 children over a period of 26 years.

== Biography ==
Atkins was born in Richmond upon Thames, Surrey. Her parents were Eric D. Atkins and Lilian L. Millson. The family moved to Bucklebury when she was young, and she attended Shaw House School in Newbury before returning to London. During World War II Atkins and her sister, Sylvia Vivian Atkins (1933–1990) were evacuated from London to rural England. In her memoir, Atkins stated that she, and her sister had been beaten and neglected by caregivers.

Atkins began appearing on British television in the 1960s; her television credits included episodes of The Sweeney, in which she played Brenda Keever the wife of a career criminal, Dixon of Dock Green, Deadline Midnight, No Hiding Place, Survivors, The Avengers and The Likely Lads. She also starred as Ruth Jameson in Emmerdale. Her best-known role was that of Sheila Ashton in the 1970s drama series A Family at War.

Atkins became interested in helping needy children after being invited to open a fair at a children's home in Manchester in 1970. She was upset at the level of deprivation and distress that she witnessed, and it reminded her of her childhood trauma as a wartime evacuee. That same year, Atkins bought and renovated a thatched cottage called "Crossways" and sought funding to run it as a home. In 1971 she started taking in disturbed and needy children, all under the age of 10 and some as young as 18 months. She had no training or education in related fields, so she educated herself through reading books by psychiatrist R. D. Laing and studying child psychology and psychotherapy.

During the 1980s, Atkins made occasional performing appearances, such as in the BBC One series Flesh and Blood in 1980. She also lobbied for funding and other support to run the home, such as a promotion run by a pharmacy to seek donations.

In 1987 she was offered free use of Gyde House, an Edwardian mansion in the Cotswolds which had more recently been used as an orphanage. She moved 15 children from Crossways into the mansion and local authorities sent her additional children to care for. Some of the children had experienced severe abuse, and attacked the house by setting parts of it on fire, or graffiti-ing the walls.

In 1990, Atkins published her memoirs as Seeing Red. The following year, Atkins adapted the book into eight episodes for radio, which were broadcast on BBC Radio 4. In 2000, ITV dramatised the story in a TV drama of the same name, starring Sarah Lancashire as Atkins. She was also the subject of an episode of the Thames Television show This Is Your Life in 1994. In 1997, she was severely injured in a car crash and had to give up running the children's home.

== Personal life ==
Atkins was married to British actor Jeremy Young. After divorcing him, she had a six-year relationship with film director Peter Whitehead, with whom she had a son, Harry Whitehead. Atkins died in West Berkshire Community Hospital, Thatcham, West Berkshire on 2 December 2016, after a short battle with cancer.
