= The Borgias (1981 TV series) =

British television drama serial

- Created by: Mark Shivas
- Written by: John Prebble; Ken Taylor
- Directed by: Brian Farnham
- Starring: Adolfo Celi; Oliver Cotton
- Music by: Georges Delerue
- Countries of origin: United Kingdom; Italy
- No. of seasons: 1

Production
- Producer: Mark Shivas
- Production company: BBC – RAI

Original release
- Network: BBC Two
- Release: 14 October – 16 December 1981

The Borgias is a British television drama serial produced by the BBC in 1981, in association with the Second Network of the Italian broadcaster RAI. The series, produced by Mark Shivas, was set in Italy during the late 15th and early 16th centuries and told the story of Rodrigo Borgia (played by Adolfo Celi) – the future Pope Alexander VI – and his family, including his son Cesare (Oliver Cotton) and daughter Lucrezia (Anne Louise Lambert).

The 10 episodes follow events from 1492 when Rodrigo is elected pope and concludes in 1507 with Cesare's violent death.

Despite high ratings, the programme was not a critical success, with many commentators focusing on Celi's accented English and making invidious comparisons with ITV's high-profile competitor Brideshead Revisited.

== Production ==
Shortly before it was broadcast, The Sunday Telegraph reported the production as the most expensive drama series in the BBC's history; the Corporation declared the budget as £2.3 million. RAI, Seven Network and Time Life Television were involved in financing. Location shooting took place in Rome, Tuscany, Spoleto, Viterbo and Urbino, for 12 weeks commencing April 1980. This only accounted for around 30% of footage, as the majority was shot on studio video.

Director Brian Farnham announced to the press:

The Borgias is like a western. Plenty of action. There's incest and nudity. There's beheading and garroting. There's blood. We've had to be harsh. It was a harsh time. But we've also remained true to the subject.

Transmission was originally meant to be in March 1981, but a union dispute delayed it. The first episode screened on BBC Two on Wednesday 14 October 1981.

== Reception ==
Intended to be a gripping historical melodrama in the same vein as the earlier BBC series, I, Claudius, the series was not a critical success. The BBC screened the series at the same time as ITV's lavish Brideshead Revisited, and critics contrasted the high production values and stellar cast of Brideshead with The Borgias' seeming focus on frequent graphic violence and nudity.

Elkan Allan wrote, in a preview for The Times of both titles:

Watching a compilation of scenes from The Borgias, chosen to display its range and approach, I was worried by what appeared to be its attempt to cash in on the success of I, Claudius. Once more the titillation of orgies and incest are emphasized as concominants to a power struggle at court... Such a lurid retelling of the myths (the facts that are known about the Borgias are capable of various interpretations) might have been expected to figure on ITV instead of BBC2, and such a respectful and serious an adaptation of a modern classic as Brideshead Revisited might have been thought more likely for BBC2 than ITV. That they are the other way round says a great deal about the BBC's desperation for ratings and ITV's for respectability.

Because both networks were concerned about the possibility of a scheduling clash between the two series, BBC2 Controller Brian Wenham took the unusual step of letting ITV know informally that The Borgias would be screened on Wednesday nights.

The Sicilian-born actor Adolfo Celi was well known to have a heavy Sicilian accent: as Emilio Largo in Thunderball, he had been dubbed by Robert Rietti. In The Borgias, Celi did his own voice acting, and several critics commented adversely on his thickly-accented English. (Note: Elkan Allan reported in a preview for The Times: "His intrusive Italian accent is excused by the producer, Mark Shivas, on the grounds that Rodrigo came from Sapin [sic] and thus would have had a different accent from the rest of the Vatican court." Nancy Banks-Smith called Celi "almost unintelligible". Michael Ratcliffe wrote, in a comparatively indulgent review, "Celi has spirit and style... but his inglesish is very distracting". Clive James made fun of one particular line reading: "Referring to a trip taken by Juan and Cesare, he says: 'They got nipples together.' Eventually you figure out that he means they go to Naples together.")

While The Borgias was still screening, incoming Director-General of the BBC Alasdair Milne acknowledged criticisms of the programme: "I am immensely proud of our TV drama through the years - we may have stumbled over The Borgias, but we don't stumble very often". As the series drew to a close, The Times reported that "The Borgias is a critical laughing stock" but added that it had been a "triumph" for ratings, noting that its weekly viewing figures of 8 million were particularly high for BBC2. Its explanation was: "The Borgias has gone out on an evening when both BBC1 and ITV have been primarily concerned with sport, and when there has consequently been a spare and sizeable audience waiting to be picked up."

The series finally screened in America in 1985 via the Arts & Entertainment Network, with Edwin Newman introducing and contributions from period experts. The nudity that appeared on British and Australian TV was trimmed for American viewers. John J. O'Connor, reviewing for The New York Times, praised Tim Harvey's design but found Celi's performance sluggish, the action confusing and the dialogue poor.

== Legacy ==
Screenonline calls it "one of the most panned series of its day, a fixture of 'all-time worst TV' lists ever since"; the editor of The Penguin TV Companion (2006), nominating it as one of the 20 worst programmes ever made, claimed it had even been condemned by the Vatican.

The Borgias was released on DVD in the UK by 2 Entertain in 2016.

== Cast ==
Character	Actor
Pope Alexander VI	Adolfo Celi
Cesare Borgia	Oliver Cotton
Giuliano della Rovere	Alfred Burke
Lucrezia Borgia	Anne-Louise Lambert
Juan Borgia	George Camiller
Jofre Borgia	Louis Selwyn
Vanozza Canale	Barbara Shelley
Giulia Farnese	Serretta Wilson

== Sources ==
- Crace, Jim (6 September 1981). "Who shot the Borgias?". The Sunday Telegraph. No. 1065. pp. 40–52.
