= Jeremy Young =

British actor (1934–2022)

- Born: John Henry Young; 28 July 1934; Liverpool, Lancashire, England
- Died: 9 April 2022 (aged 87); Twickenham, Middlesex, England
- Occupation: Actor
- Years active: 1958–2017
- Spouses: Coral Atkins (m. 1960–1960); Kate O'Mara (m. 1971; div. 1976)

John Henry Young (28 July 1934 – 9 April 2022), known professionally as Jeremy Young, was a British actor.

Young had numerous television credits, including Deadline Midnight (1960), Doctor Who (appearing as caveman Kal in three episodes of the first serial An Unearthly Child in 1963, as well as playing Gordon Lowery in the one episode serial Mission to the Unknown in 1965), The Avengers in 1966 (notably as Willy Frant in the episode "A Touch of Brimstone" though also in the episodes entitled "Never, Never Say Die" (1967), "The Forget-Me-Knot" (1968) and (in The New Avengers) "Gnaws" in 1976), and Coronation Street as nightclub owner Benny Lewis in 1972. His film credits include appearances in The Wild and the Willing (1962), Crooks and Coronets (1969), Eyewitness (1970), Hopscotch (1980) and Photographing Fairies (1997).

He worked for BBC Radio and taught and directed at the Court Theatre Training Company which is part of the Courtyard, London.

Young was married to actress Coral Atkins in 1960, and later to Kate O'Mara from 1971 to 1976. He died on 9 April 2022.

== Filmography ==
=== Film ===
Year	Title	Role	Notes
1958	The Haunted Strangler	Judas Hole waiter	uncredited
1962	Masters of Venus	Hampton	uncredited
1962	The Wild and the Willing	Policeman	
1963	Bomb in the High Street	Police constable at HQ	uncredited
1964	A Hard Day's Night	Police constable	uncredited
1965	Rotten to the Core	Security officer on train	uncredited
1966	Rasputin the Mad Monk	Court Messenger	uncredited
1969	Crooks and Coronets	Tim Reilly	
1970	Eyewitness	Monk	
1972	Frenzy	Policeman	uncredited
1980	Hopscotch	Immigration Officer	
1980	Driving Test	The driving instructor	short film
1997	Photographing Fairies	Des	
2003	A Dead End Story	Unknown	short film

=== Television ===
Year	Title	Episode(s)	Role	Network	Archive status
1959	The Cabin in the Clearing	Episodes 1-3	Unknown	BBC Television Service	Missing
1959	The Life and Death of Sir John Falstaff	Episode 3: Into Battle	Unknown	BBC Television Service	Missing
1960	Deadline Midnight	Series 1, 9 episodes	Neville Crane	ITV (ATV)	Partial (episodes 1 & 12 missing)
1960	Armchair Theatre	Series 4, Episode 16: The Great Gold Bullion Robbery	Massingham	ITV (ABC)	Missing
1961	Theatre 70	Series 1, Episode 22: Call for Mr. Ariman	Young man in nightclub	ITV (ATV)	Exists
1961	Deadline Midnight	Series 2, 10 episodes and Series 3, 9 episodes	Neville Crane	ITV (ATV)	Exists
1961	Armchair Theatre	Series 4, Episode 40: The Night of the Apes	Pete	ITV (ABC)	Missing
1962	Z-Cars	Series 2, Episode 5: Friendly Relations	Tom Morgan	BBC Television	Exists
1962	Harpers West One	Series 2, Episode 10: Four applicants for three supervisory positions	Padraic Regan	ITV (ATV)	Missing
1963	Suspense	Series 2, Episode 20: The Edge of Discovery	Campbell	BBC Television	Missing
1963	Moonstrike	Series 1, Episode 17: The Biggest Bandit	Anatole	BBC Television	Exists
1963	Ghost Squad	Series 2, Episode 25: Lost in Transit	Jimmy Rice	ITV (ITC)	Exists
1963	Maupassant	Series 1, Episode 4: War	Comte de Garens	ITV (Granada)	Exists
1963	BBC Sunday-Night Play	Series 4, Episode 47: The Creevey Column	Richard Stevens	BBC Television	Missing
1963	Compact	Episode 184: Alarms and Excursions	Mr. Frimley	BBC Television	Missing
1963	Doctor Who	Series 1: An Uneartly Child (3 episodes)	Kal	BBC Television	Exists
1964	Comedy Playhouse	Series 3, Episode 13: The Mate Market	Alan	BBC Television	Exists
1964	Z-Cars	Series 3, Episode 25: A Question of Storage	Norton	BBC Television	Exists
1964	The Villains	Series 1, Episode 5: Les Girls	Grainer	ITV (Granada)	Exists
1964	No Hiding Place	Series 6, Episode 12: Trained to Kill	Hammer Tovey	ITV (Rediffusion)	Missing
1964	Cluff	Series 1, Episode 5: The Daughter-in-law	Billy Lamb	BBC One	Missing
1964	The Indian Tales of Rudyard Kipling	Episode 19: Consequences	Clerk	BBC One	Missing
1965	Z-Cars	Series 4, Episode 22: A Matter of Give and Take	Stone	BBC One	Missing
1965	The Villains	Series 3, Episode 7: Sonny	Inspector Henry	ITV (Granada)	Exists
1965	R3	Series 2, Episode 4: Experiment in Depth	Wilson	BBC One	Missing
1965	A Slight Case of…	Series 1, Episode 5: Identity	Unknown	BBC One	Exists
1965	Doctor Who	Series 3, Episode 5: Mission to the Unknown	Gordon Lowery	BBC One	Audio recording survives
1966	No Hiding Place	Series 8, Episode 13: The Fit-Up	Inspector	ITV (Rediffusion)	Missing
1966	The Avengers	Series 4, Episode 21: A Touch of Brimstone	Willy Frant	ITV (ABC)	Exists
1966	Court Martial	Series 1, Episode 2: Taps for the Sergeant	Cpl. Stanley Jones	ITV (ITC)	Exists
1966	Thirty-Minute Theatre	Series 1, Episode 32: The Hard Word	Boss	BBC Two	Missing
1966	The Wednesday Play	Series 4, Episode 24: A Soirée at Blossom's Hotel	Second demolition officer	BBC One	Missing
1966	The Wednesday Play	Series 5, Episode 2: A Hero of Our Time	Captain of the Dragoons	BBC One	Exists
1966	Adam Adamant Lives!	Series 1, Episode 6: The Terribly Happy Embalmers	Wilson	BBC One	Exists
1966	The Three Musketeers	All 10 episodes	Athos	BBC One	Exists
1966	The Saint	Series 5, Episode 8: The Man Who Liked Lions	Inspector Galba	ITV (ITC)	Exists
1967	Vendetta	Series 1, Episode 11: The Mourning Man	Attamare	BBC One	Missing
1967	Softly, Softly	Series 2, Episode 19: The Same the Whole World Over	Hunt	BBC One	Missing
1967	The Avengers	Series 5, Episode 10: Never, Never Say Die	Dr. Penrose	ITV (ABC)	Exists
1967	The Fellows	Series 1, Episode 7: A Snatch in Time	Vyner	ITV (Granada)	Exists
1967	The Further Adventures of the Musketeers	All 16 episodes	Athos	BBC One	Exists
1967	Scottish Playbill	Episode 12: The Queen of Scots	Bromley	ITV (STV)	Exists
1968	Softly, Softly	Series 3, Episodes 25-26: Fortune on the Move Pts. 1 & 2	Law	BBC One	Missing
1968	The Avengers	Series 6, Episode 1: The Forget-Me-Knot	George Burton	ITV (Thames)	Exists
1969	The Saint	Series 6, Episode 17: The Ex-King of Diamonds	Gregorio	ITV (ITC)	Exists
1969	Department S	Series 1, Episode 4: The Pied Piper of Hambledown	Doctor Brogan	ITV (ITC)	Exists
1969	The First Lady	Series 2, Episode 3: Fancy Man	Unknown	BBC One	Missing
1969	Z-Cars	Series 6, Episodes 243-244: Have a Go, Joe! Pts. 1 & 2	Joe Drage	BBC One	Exists
1969	Dixon of Dock Green	Series 16, Episode 1: The Paperhangers	McCleod	BBC One	Missing
1969	Dixon of Dock Green	Series 16, Episode 11: The Brimstone Man	Jack Long	BBC One	Missing
1969	The Canterbury Tales	4 of 7 episodes	Merchant	BBC One	Exists
1970	Parkin's Patch	Series 1, Episode 17: Regulation 17	Ossie Frost	ITV (Yorkshire)	Exists
1970	Softly Softly: Task Force	Series 1, Episode 9: Private Mischief	Charleston	BBC One	Exists
1970	Randall and Hopkirk (Deceased)	Series 1, Episode 25: You Can Always Find a Fall Guy	Douglas Kershaw	ITV (ITC)	Exists
1970	Up Pompeii!	Series 1, Episode 2: The Ides of March	Ponderous	BBC One	Exists
1970	Doomwatch	Series 1, Episode 11: The Battery People	Vincent Llewellyn	BBC One	Exists
1971	Trial	Series 1, Episode 12: In Judgement	George Burton	BBC Two	Missing
1971	Thirty-Minute Theatre	Series 7, Episode 11: Jenkins	Masters	BBC Two	Missing
1972	The Onedin Line	Series 1, Episode 14: Blockade	Fergusson	BBC One	Exists
1972	Coronation Street	Episodes 1198-1209 & 1230-1239	Benny Lewis	ITV (Granada)	Exists
1972	Dixon of Dock Green	Series 19, Episode 9: Starpoint West	Barry	BBC One	Missing
1973	Frankenstein: The True Story	TV Movie	2nd helper	NBC	Exists
1974	Justice	Series 3, Episode 1: Trial for Murder	Ronnie Manners	ITV (Yorkshire	Exists
1975	The Sweeney	Series 1, Episode 7: The Placer	Wren	ITV (Thames)	Exists
1976	Killers	Series 1, Episode 4: Murder at the Metropole	Reginald Reed	ITV (Thames)	Exists
1976	The New Avengers	Series 1, Episode 10: Gnaws	Ivan Chislenko	ITV (LWT)	Exists
1977	The Velvet Glove	Series 1, Episode 4: Beyond this Life	Sir Robert Peel	BBC Two	Exists
1977	Crossroads	Episode 2709	Prof. Angrave	ITV (ATV)	Missing
1977	Space: 1999	Series 2, Episodes 18-19: The Bringers of Wonders Pts. 1 & 2	Jack Bartlett	ITV (ITC)	All programmes exist from this point
1977	Out of the Past	Series 4, Episodes 1-2	Unknown	BBC One	All programmes exist from this point
1977	Van der Valk	Series 3, Episode 8: Dead on Arrival	Eddie Palmer	ITV (Thames)	All programmes exist from this point
1978	The Onedin Line	Series 6, Episode 7: Highly Explosive	Mr. Snellgrove	BBC One	All programmes exist from this point
1978	BBC Television Shakespeare	Series 1, Episode 1: Romeo & Juliet	1st watch	BBC Two	All programmes exist from this point
1979	Dick Barton: Special Agent	9 episodes	Klaus	ITV (Southern)	All programmes exist from this point
1980	God's Wonderful Railway	Episodes 7 & 8: Fire on the Line Pts. 2 & 3	Sergeant	BBC One	All programmes exist from this point
1980	Cribb	Series 1, Episode 6: Wobble to Death	Peter Chalk	ITV (Granada)	All programmes exist from this point
1980	The Further Adventures of Oliver Twist	Series 1, Episodes 11 & 12	Dan Posset	ITV (ATV)	All programmes exist from this point
1980	Minder	Series 2, Episode 1: National Pelmet	Everett	ITV (Thames)	All programmes exist from this point
1980	The Onedin Line	Series 8, Episode 4: The Honeymoon	Kettle	BBC One	All programmes exist from this point
1980	The Professionals	Series 4, Episode 9: Slush Fund	Geiser	ITV (LWT)	All programmes exist from this point
1981	John Keats	Episode 2: Climb with Me the Steep	Wordsworth	BBC Two	All programmes exist from this point
1982	On the Line	All 13 episodes	Alec Shawcross	ITV (Central)	All programmes exist from this point
1984	The Tripods	Series 1, Episodes 5-8	Count	BBC One	All programmes exist from this point
1984	Scarecrow and Mrs. King	Series 2, Episode 8: Affair at Bromfield Hall	Ronald Compson	CBS	All programmes exist from this point
1986	Brat Farrar	Episodes 1 & 3-6	Mr. Gregg	BBC One	All programmes exist from this point
1986	Brookside	Episode 395: Persistence	Jim McNally	Channel 4	All programmes exist from this point
1988	Rockliffe's Babies	Series 2, Episode 1: Go for It	Mr. Chitty	BBC One	All programmes exist from this point
1988	A Very British Coup	All 3 episodes	Alford	Channel 4	All programmes exist from this point
1988	EastEnders	21 episodes	Officer Stone	BBC One	All programmes exist from this point
1990	Poirot	Series 2, Episode 1: Peril at End House	Bert Croft	ITV (LWT)	All programmes exist from this point
1990	The Paradise Club	Series 2, Episode 5: Old Pals	Wilson	BBC One	All programmes exist from this point
1992	Taggart	Series 7, Episodes 2-3: Nest of Vipers Pts. 1 & 2	Prof. Hutton	ITV (STV)	All programmes exist from this point
1992	Perfect Scoundrels	Series 3, Episode 1: Party Games	Tegg	ITV (TVS)	All programmes exist from this point
1992	The Bill	Series 8, Episode 47: World to Rights	Mr. Justice Fowldes	ITV (Thames)	All programmes exist from this point
1992	Covington Cross	Series 1, Episode 9: The Trial	Barlow	ABC	All programmes exist from this point
1993	Scarlet and Black	Duke of Wellington	Duke of Wellington	BBC One	All programmes exist from this point
1994	Cadfael	Series 1, Episode 1: One Corpse Too Many	Arnulf of Hesdin	ITV (Central)	All programmes exist from this point
1998	The Bill	Series 14, Episode 42: The Scent of Compassion	Joseph Silberman	ITV (Thames)	All programmes exist from this point
1998	Picking up the Pieces	Episode 8	Rob	ITV (Central)	All programmes exist from this point
2000	Brookside	Episode 2437: Cracking	Dennis Power	Channel 4	All programmes exist from this point
2003	Murder in Mind	Series 3, Episode 1: Echoes	Guest	BBC One	All programmes exist from this point
2003	The Debt	TV Movie	Judge	BBC One	All programmes exist from this point
