= J. L. Manning =

British sports columnist

J. L. Manning OBE
- Born: James Lionel Manning; 10 January 1914; Bristol, Gloucestershire, England
- Died: 18 January 1974 (aged 60); Lambeth, London, England
- Occupation: Columnist
- Spouse: Amy Jenkins (m. 1939)
- Children: 2, including Katy
- Relatives: Brian Manning (half-brother)

James Lionel Manning OBE (10 January 1914 – 18 January 1974) was a British sports columnist for the Daily Mail. Born in Bristol, then in the County of Gloucestershire, in 1914, Manning was the eldest son of sports writer Lionel Victor Manning, and the elder half-brother of Brian Stuart Manning (1927–2004) a leading British Marxist historian.

He was appointed Officer of the Order of the British Empire (OBE) in the 1974 New Year Honours.

== Journalism career ==
In 1954, as a member of the National Union of Journalists, Manning wrote a harsh piece on ‘non-journalist’ sports writers, which brought him into conflict with Norris McWhirter 1925-2004 and his twin brother Ross. The McWhirter twins were keen to follow their own publishing star, which led to their notable success The Guinness Book of Records and allowed them to find fame on TV’s Record Breakers with Roy Castle. The McWhirters sued Manning for libel and slander and were awarded £300 damages.

In 1966, he wrote a noteworthy piece on the climatic problems facing Olympic athletes:

'I am sorry Mexico City is 7,500 ft. above sea level. I also regret that it is cold in Iceland, hot in Malaya, high in Nepal, inflationary in France, communist in Russia, earth-quakey in Chile, oily in Iraq, sandy in Egypt, intolerant in Ireland, foggy in Britain, revolting in West Africa, Democratic in the United States, malarial in the Congo, humid in Jamaica, indeterminate in Mali and another day altogether in Fiji.'

=== Tour de France expose ===
In 1967 Manning was noted for bringing to the attention of the public the part played by performance-enhancing drugs in the death of Tom Simpson (1937–1967) during the Tour de France. He wrote:

'Tommy Simpson rode to his death in the Tour de France so doped that he did not know he had reached the limit of his endurance. He died in the saddle, slowly asphyxiated by intense effort in a heatwave after taking methylamphetamine drugs and alcoholic stimulants.'

== Political career ==
In the 1955 general election, Manning stood as the Conservative candidate for Parliament in Enfield East against the Labour Party's incumbent Ernest Davies in a two-person contest. Manning won 39% of the vote, losing to Davies by 7,701 votes.

== Personal life and death ==
Manning's Welsh wife was Amy Sylvia Jenkins; they had two daughters, Mrs Jane E. Dressler (1941-2014) fashion model and founder of the Roanoke Children's Theatre in America, and Catherine Ann Manning, born 1946, in Surrey, who is better known as the actor Katy Manning.

Manning died on 18 January 1974 aged 60.
