= Serendib =

Serendib may refer to:

- Serendib, derived from Serendip (disambiguation), is an Old Persian name for Sri Lanka. It is also the etymological root of the word serendipity.
- Serendib (spider), a spider genus in the family Corinnidae
- Serendib, a location on the fictional Plane of Rabiah from the card game Magic: the Gathering
- Serendib Express, a former name for Lankan Cargo airline
- Serendib Leisure, a hotel group of Hemas Holdings PLC in Sri Lanka
- Serendib Productions, a film-producing company founded by Sri Lankan producer Shesha Palihakkara
- Sarandib Planitia, a region on Saturn's moon Enceladus named after the old name for Sri Lanka
