= Serendipity (disambiguation) =

Serendipity is an accidental lucky discovery.

Serendipity may also refer to:

== Entertainment ==
- Serendipity (film), 2001 film starring Kate Beckinsale and John Cusack
- Serendipity (book series), written by Stephen Cosgrove
  - Serendipity the Pink Dragon, an anime television series based on the book series
- Serendipity (U.K. TV series), British arts and crafts television series in 1973
- Serendipity, local KNBC children's series broadcast in the 1970s
- "Serendipity", an episode of the TV series Law & Order: Special Victims Unit
- Serendipity, a character played by Salma Hayek in the film Dogma

=== Music ===
- The Serendipity Singers, a 1960s American folk group
- Serendipity (Walt Dickerson album), 1977
- Serendipity (Mike Garson album), 1986
- "Serendipity", an album by Premiata Forneria Marconi, 2000
- "Serendipity", a song on the album Once Only Imagined by The Agonist, 2007
- "Serendipity", a song on the album Barenaked Ladies Are Men by Barenaked Ladies, 2007
- "Serendipity", a song on the album Amaranthe by Amaranthe, 2011
- "Serendipity", a song by Angelina Pivarnick featuring Adam Barta, 2012
- "Serendipity" (Mai Kuraki song), a song on the album Smile, 2015
- "Serendipity" (BTS song), a song by South Korean boy band BTS, 2017

== Other uses ==
- Serendipity 3, a restaurant and boutique started in New York City
- Serendipity Beach, a famous beach in Sihanoukville, South Cambodia
- Serendipity (software), a PHP based blog and web-based content management system
- Serendipity Spire, a mountain in Canada
