= Tom Scannell =

Irish footballer (1925–1993)

Personal information
- Full name: Thomas Scannell
- Date of birth: 3 June 1925
- Place of birth: Youghal, Ireland
- Date of death: 30 November 1993 (aged 68)
- Place of death: Stepney, England
- Height: 6 ft 0 in (1.83 m)
- Position: Goalkeeper

Senior career*
Years	Team	Apps	(Gls)
- Tilbury
1949–1955	Southend United	98	(0)
- Folkestone

International career
1954	Republic of Ireland	1	(0)
- * Club domestic league appearances and goals

Thomas Scannell (3 June 1925 – 30 November 1993) was an Irish professional footballer.

== Club career ==
Born in Youghal, Ireland, Scannell began his career in England with Essex-based club Tilbury. In November 1949, Scannell signed for Southend United. Scannell's transfer fee, coupled with Tilbury's impressive run to the FA Cup first round in the same year, allowed Tilbury to purchase their Chadfields ground. Whilst at Southend, Scannell made 98 Football League appearances at the club, conceding 148 goals in his first 100 games in all competitions and keeping 31 clean sheets. In 1955, following his time at Southend, Scannell dropped back into non-league, signing for Folkestone.

== International career ==
On 7 March 1954, aged 29, Scannell made a solitary senior appearance for the Republic of Ireland national football team, starting in an experimental line-up that defeated Luxembourg 1–0 in a World Cup qualifier.

== Personal life ==
Scannell and his wife Peggy had five children, one of whom, Tony, was an actor, best known for his role as Detective Sergeant Ted Roach in the television series The Bill. Tony left The Bill in 1993, the same year of his father's death, before a brief return in 2000. Tony died in May 2020. Another son of Scannell's, John, was a semi-professional goalkeeper, who played for Herne Bay and Whitstable Town.
