= A Family at War =

British television period drama series (1970–1972)

- Opening title
- Genre: Drama
- Created by: John Finch
- Developed by: Granada Television
- Starring: Colin Douglas; Barbara Flynn; Leslie Nunnerley; Coral Atkins
- Theme music composer: Ralph Vaughan Williams
- Country of origin: United Kingdom
- Original language: English
- No. of series: 3
- No. of episodes: 52

Production
- Running time: 60 minutes

Original release
- Network: ITV
- Release: 14 April 1970 – 16 February 1972

A Family at War is a British drama television series that aired on ITV from 14 April 1970 to 16 February 1972. It was created by John Finch and made by Granada Television for ITV. The original producer was Richard Doubleday, and with 13 directors during the series. The series examined the lives of the lower middle-class Ashton family of the city of Liverpool and their experiences from 1938 and throughout the Second World War.

Fifty-two episodes were produced, all but eight of them in colour. Episodes numbers 25 to 32 were recorded in black and white because of the ITV Colour Strike. The theme music is from the end of the First Movement (Allegro) of Vaughan Williams's Sixth Symphony. The programme opening titles show a scene of a beach with a child's sand castle, with Union Flag flying, slowly being approached by the encroaching tide, symbolic of a beleaguered Britain standing alone in 1940–1941.

== Plot summary ==
The families Ashton, Briggs, and Porter live in Liverpool in 1938 and later. Edwin Ashton, the son of a mineworker, has moved up to the middle class by working for a printing company and by marrying Jean, the sister of company owner Sefton Briggs. The latter is a hard businessman who appoints his son Tony as the new manager of the workplace, rather than the experienced Edwin.

Edwin and Jean have five children: Philip, David, Robert, Margaret, and Freda. Philip is a leftist who fought as a volunteer in the Spanish Civil War. David joins the RAF because he cannot find another job. He is married to Sheila, but he impregnates Peggy. Robert, the youngest son, wants to join the Navy. Margaret, the eldest Ashton daughter, marries John Porter, but she has a troubled relationship with her mother-in-law Celia. All these events take place against the backdrop of the political conflict leading to the Second World War, which will have a major impact on their lives.

== Cast ==
- Colin Douglas as Edwin Ashton
- Shelagh Fraser as Jean Ashton
- Colin Campbell as David Ashton
- Barbara Flynn as Freda Ashton
- Keith Drinkel as Philip Ashton
- David Dixon as Robert Ashton
- Lesley Nunnerley as Margaret Porter
- Coral Atkins as Sheila Ashton
- John McKelvey as Sefton Briggs
- T.R. Bowen as Tony Briggs
- Ian Thompson as John Porter
- Diana Davies as Doris Jackson
- John Nettles as Ian Mackenzie
- Mark Jones as Michael Armstrong
- Margery Mason as Celia Porter
- Patrick Troughton as Harry Porter
- Brett Usher as Ken Beaumont
- Mark Edwards
- Bryan Marshall as Stashek

== Episodes ==
=== Series overview ===
Series	Episodes	Originally released	
Series	Episodes	First released	Last released
1	13	14 April 1970	4 August 1970
2	19	11 November 1970	17 March 1971
3	20	6 October 1971	16 February 1972

=== Series 1 (1970) ===
No. overall	No. in series	Title	Original release date
1	1	"The Facts of Life"	14 April 1970
2	2	"To Die For Spain"	21 April 1970
3	3	"Lines of Battle"	28 April 1970
4	4	"The Summer Before the War"	5 May 1970
5	5	"The Gate of the Year"	12 May 1970
6	6	"The Breach in the Dyke"	19 May 1970
7	7	"The War Office Regrets"	26 May 1970
8	8	"For Strategic Reasons"	30 June 1970
9	9	"The Night They Hit No.8"	7 July 1970
10	10	"One of Ours"	14 July 1970
11	11	"Brothers in War"	21 July 1970
12	12	"If It's Got Your Number On It"	28 July 1970
13	13	"The End of the Beginning"	4 August 1970

=== Series 2 (1970-1) ===
No. overall	No. in series	Title	Original release date
14	1	"The Other Side of the Hill"	11 November 1970
15	2	"I Can Be Happy, Can't I?"	18 November 1970
16	3	"A Lesson in War"	25 November 1970
17	4	"Is Your Journey Really Necessary?"	2 December 1970
18	5	"The Forty-Eight Hour Pass"	9 December 1970
19	6	"Hope Against Hope"	16 December 1970
20	7	"A Time to Be Born"	23 December 1970
21	8	"A Hero's Welcome"	30 December 1970
22	9	"We Could Be a Lot Worse Off"	6 January 1971
23	10	"Lend Your Loving Arms"	13 January 1971
24	11	"Hazard"	20 January 1971
25	12	"Giving and Taking"	27 January 1971
26	13	"Believed Killed"	3 February 1971
27	14	"Into the Dark"	10 February 1971
28	15	"The Straight and Narrow"	17 February 1971
29	16	"Clash By Night"	24 February 1971
30	17	"Salute the Happy Morn"	3 March 1971
31	18	"I Wanted to Be With You"	10 March 1971
32	19	"A Separate Peace"	17 March 1971

=== Series 3 (1971-2) ===
No. overall	No. in series	Title	Original release date
33	1	"The Lucky Ones"	6 October 1971
34	2	"For the Duration"	13 October 1971
35	3	"Happy Returns"	20 October 1971
36	4	"The Things You Never Told Me"	27 October 1971
37	5	"You Can Choose Your Friends"	3 November 1971
38	6	"Flesh and Blood"	10 November 1971
39	7	"Spread a Little Happiness"	17 November 1971
40	8	"Take It on Trust"	24 November 1971
41	9	"This Time, Next Year..."	1 December 1971
42	10	"The Fundamental Things Apply"	8 December 1971
43	11	"Thicker Than Water"	15 December 1971
44	12	"Breaking Point"	22 December 1971
45	13	"The Lost Ones"	29 December 1971
46	14	"The Sensible Thing"	5 January 1972
47	15	"Under New Management"	12 January 1972
48	16	"Coming Home"	19 January 1972
49	17	"A Faint Refrain"	26 January 1972
50	18	"Two Fathers"	2 February 1972
51	19	"The Old Order Changeth..."	9 February 1972
52	20	"Yielding Place to New"	16 February 1972

== DVD release ==
All episodes of A Family at War are available on DVD in the UK, distributed by Acorn Media UK, but with several of the episodes edited from their original running times. For example, in episode three, Margery Mason and Patrick Troughton are credited, but do not appear.

The series was released in the Netherlands in 2015 by Just Entertainment. Several brief scenes cut from the Acorn set do appear in the Netherlands set, such as the scene referenced above.

The series is rated PG in New Zealand for violence, sex scenes and sexual references.
