= 23 Walks =

2020 British comedy-drama film

- Film poster
- Directed by: Paul Morrison
- Written by: Paul Morrison
- Produced by: Stewart Le Marechal; Anna Mohr-Pietsch; Maggie Monteith
- Starring: Alison Steadman; Dave Johns; Graham Cole; Bob Goody
- Cinematography: David Katznelson
- Production company: Met Film Production
- Release dates: 30 July 2020 (Australia); 25 September 2020 (United Kingdom)
- Running time: 102 minutes
- Country: United Kingdom
- Language: English
- Box office: $421,146

23 Walks is a 2020 British romantic comedy-drama film written and directed by Paul Morrison. It stars Alison Steadman, Dave Johns and Graham Cole. It was released on 30 July 2020 in Australia and on 25 September 2020 to cinemas in the United Kingdom.

== Cast ==
- Alison Steadman as Fern
- Dave Johns as Dave
- Graham Cole as Jimmy
- Bob Goody as George
- Marsha Millar as Marcy
- Oliver Powell as Saul
- Natalie Simpson as Donna
- Vivienne Soan as Chaplin
- Rakhee Thakrar as Registrar

== Location ==
Although not stated on screen, the outdoor scenes where the walks take place were filmed in the London Borough of Barnet – in Chipping Barnet and Hadley, including King George's Fields in Monken Hadley (which is on the London Loop).

== Release ==
The film was released on 30 July 2020 in Australia, and on 25 September 2020 in the United Kingdom.

== Reception ==
Critics generally praised the film, while others panned the script and dialogue. As of October 2021, 73% of the 22 reviews compiled on Rotten Tomatoes are positive, with an average rating of 5.9/10. The Sydney Morning Herald praised Steadman's acting, saying "Her performance is a masterclass in the art of elevating a mediocre script" and that "she is the factor that makes 23 Walks something other than a dead loss". Subculture Media called it a "brilliantly written film that packs quite a punch as it explores social topics that many other films would shy away from", labelling it "one of the best screenplays of 2020". Others named it an "incredibly sweet film".
