= Serendipity (TV series) =

1973 British TV series

- Genre: Educational
- Created by: Sheila Innes
- Directed by: Carol Wiseman
- Presented by: Katy Manning
- Country of origin: United Kingdom
- Original language: English
- No. of episodes: 10

Production
- Producer: Charles Pascoe
- Production locations: BBC Television Centre, London
- Editor: Sheila Innes
- Running time: 25 minutes

Original release
- Network: BBC1
- Release: 30 September – 2 December 1973

Serendipity is a short-lived BBC television series consisting of ten episodes, which was broadcast from September to December 1973 at Sunday lunch times on BBC1, presented by actress Katy Manning, who had only recently left her role as Jo Grant in the TV series Doctor Who. It was Manning's first TV presenting role. The series presented a guide to getting started in arts and crafts. The Radio Times carried the tag line "Crafts are for everyone" for each episode listing. A book accompanying the series was published, retailing at 40 pence.

== Episodes ==
No.	Title	Directed by	Original release date
1	"Where To Start?"	Carol Wiseman	30 September 1973
2	"Dyeing and Printing"	Carol Wiseman	7 October 1973
3	"Metal Jewellery"	Carol Wiseman	14 October 1973
4	"Gemstones"	Carol Wiseman	21 October 1973
5	"Modern Embroidery"	Carol Wiseman	28 October 1973
6	"Modelling in Clay"	Carol Wiseman	4 November 1973
7	"Weaving, Macramé and Crochet"	Carol Wiseman	11 November 1973
8	"Carving"	Carol Wiseman	18 November 1973
9	"Polyester Jewellery"	Carol Wiseman	25 November 1973
10	"Don't Throw it Away!"	Carol Wiseman	2 December 1973

The first seven episodes of the series were later repeated on Monday afternoons on BBC1 from 1 April to 20 May 1974 at 2:35pm.
