= Brian Manning (historian) =

British historian (1927–2004)

- Born: 21 May 1927; London, England
- Died: 24 April 2004 (aged 76); Bellagio, Italy
- Occupations: Historian; Lecturer; Professor of History
- Spouse: Noreen Bamber (m. 1962, divorced)
- Children: 1
- Relatives: J. L. Manning (half-brother); Katy Manning (half-niece)

Brian Manning (21 May 1927 – 24 April 2004) was a British Marxist historian.

== Biography ==
Manning's father was sports writer Lionel Manning and his half-brother was Daily Mail sports columnist and one-time Conservative candidate J. L. Manning. Manning was the uncle of Doctor Who actor Katy Manning.

Manning himself went to Lancing College, winning the Brackenbury Scholarship to Balliol College, Oxford. He was appointed to a lectureship at Manchester in 1959, and, in 1980, became professor at Ulster University, becoming emeritus upon his retirement in 1992.

From its foundation until his move to Manchester, Manning served on the editorial board of the journal Past & Present, which had been set up in 1952, largely by the Communist Party Historians Group, to elaborate "history from below" – the past as the story of generations of workers and peasants, women and men, struggling to make themselves and their world.

Manning's work drew largely on the Thomason collection of pamphlets held in the British Library and on Royalist propaganda about the social origins of their opponents in the English Civil War. Many of the themes that appeared in his work in the 1950s continued to dominate his publications even though the focus of historians' work had moved elsewhere. The rise of 'revisionist' historiography in the 1970s with its dismissal of Marxist approaches was a development he deplored, but which he was unable to overturn. His own work, as a result, became increasingly out of tune with the dominant themes of historical research from the mid-1970s onwards. Manning nevertheless remained prominent as a vigorous Marxist polemicist and political activist until the end of his life.

In a group dominated by Hill and his fellow communists, Manning was an odd man out, eschewing the CP and embracing instead the emerging New Left. After moving to Ireland he joined the Irish Socialist Workers Party. He was later a supporter of the London Socialist Historians Group, which now holds an annual memorial lecture in his honour.

== Selected articles/works ==
- Politics, Religion and the English Civil War (editor) (1973)
- The English People and the English Revolution, 1640–1649 (1976)
- 1649: The Crisis of the English Revolution (1992)
- Aristocrats, Plebeians and Revolution in England 1640–1660 (1996)
- The Far Left in the English Revolution, 1640–1660 (1999)
- "History and socialism", Essay on E. H. Carr (2001)
- Revolution and Counter-Revolution in England, Ireland and Scotland, 1658–1660 (2003)
- The legacy of Christopher Hill (2003)
