= Paul Morrison (director) =

British film director and screenwriter (born 1944)

- Born: 1944 (age 81–82); London, England, UK
- Occupations: Film director Screenwriter; Psychotherapist

Paul Morrison (born 1944, London) is a British film director, screenwriter and psychotherapist.

== Early life and education ==
Morrison was born in London to a family of ethnic Eastern European Jews from Ukraine and the USSR. They had changed their surname to assimilate to England.

He made his first film while attending University College School.

Upon leaving school Morrison studied economics at Churchill College, Cambridge, and graduated with a first-class degree in 1966.

In 2019 Morrison wrote and directed 23 Walks, an older person’s dog-walking love story, starring Alison Steadman and Dave Johns. It was released in 2020.

== Filmography ==
- Solomon and Gaenor (1999)
- Wondrous Oblivion (2003)
- Little Ashes (2008)
- 23 Walks (2020)
