= Rohan Spong =

Australian documentary film director (born 1981)

Rohan Spong (born 1981) is an Australian documentary film director best known for his films All the Way Through Evening and Winter at Westbeth.

== Early life and education ==
Rohan Spong studied film theory and practice at the University of Melbourne.

== Career ==
While living in Los Angeles in 2008, Spong assembled his first feature-length documentary T is for Teacher (2009), about the experiences of four transgender school teachers in American schools. The film screened at a number of international festivals alongside Oscar contenders later that year. It was named by two Australian reviewers as among the best films to screen in Australian cinemas in 2009.

In late 2011, Spong completed the feature documentary All the Way Through Evening, about music composed in New York's East Village during the early years of the HIV/AIDS pandemic. The film premiered in East Village on 1 December 2011 (World AIDS Day). Spong and the film's main subject (elderly concert pianist Mimi Stern-Wolfe) were invited as guests of New York Mayor Michael Bloomberg on World AIDS Day 2011 as part of an annual event held at Gracie Mansion. All the Way Through Evening opened theatrically to critical acclaim and four-star reviews in Australia on 29 November 2012.

In 2014, Spong announced that he was working on a new film, Winter at Westbeth. The film charts a year in the life of Westbeth Artists Community in New York City and profiles the lives of three ageing artists, including iconic Alvin Ailey and Martha Graham dancer Dudley Williams. It also features a brief appearance by All the Way Through Evening participant Mimi Stern-Wolfe.

The film had its world premiere at the 60th Sydney Film Festival in June 2016, before screening at the 65th Melbourne International Film Festival in August. The film then screened in competition at IFC Center as part of Doc NYC, where it received a Special Jury Mention, before a screening at The Library of Congress in Washington, D.C. In November 2016. Spong and one of the film's participants, poet Ilsa Gilbert, attended this screening.
