= P. H. Moriarty =

British actor (1938–2025)

- Born: Paul Hugh Moriarty; 23 September 1938; Deptford, London, England
- Died: 2 February 2025 (aged 86); London, England
- Occupation: Actor
- Years active: 1978–2021

Paul Hugh Moriarty (23 September 1938 – 2 February 2025) was a British character actor and voice actor, known for his role as 'Razors' in John Mackenzie's The Long Good Friday, and "Hatchet" Harry Lonsdale in the Guy Ritchie film Lock, Stock and Two Smoking Barrels.

== Life and career ==
Paul Hugh Moriarty was born on 23 September 1938 in Deptford, London, England, where he was also raised.

Moriarty came to acting late in life; he had previously worked as a boxer and as a docker at the Surrey Commercial Docks. He began acting when he was discovered by a film crew shooting a scene on the English docks. He adopted the stage name of P. H. Moriarty in order to distinguish himself from the actor Paul Moriarty.

As well as being known for his role as 'Razors' in John Mackenzie's The Long Good Friday (1980), and as a hitman in Peter Hyams film Outland (1981), he also portrayed 'Hatchet Harry' in Guy Ritchie's Lock, Stock and Two Smoking Barrels (1998) and Gurney Halleck in the Sci Fi Channel's 2000 miniseries Frank Herbert's Dune and its 2003 sequel, Frank Herbert's Children of Dune.

Moriarty died in London on 2 February 2025, at the age of 86.

== Filmography ==
=== Television ===
Year	Title	Role	Notes
1978	Law & Order		Television miniseries
1979	Play for Today	David Bray	Episode: "Billy"
1980	Bloody Kids	Police 1	Television film
1980	Fox	Wesley	Episode: "Shim-Me-Sha-Wabble"
1981	The Chinese Detective	Rose	Episode: "Release"
1982	The Gentle Touch	Dealer	Episode: "One of Those Days"
1982	Bird of Prey	Security Guard	2 episodes
1982	BBC2 Playhouse	Taylor	Episode: "Jake's End"
1982	Strangers	Jimmy McNemany	Episode: "With These Gloves You Can Pass Through Mirrors (Part 2)"
1982	The Professionals	Harris	Episode: "Operation Susie"
1982	The Nation's Health	Chris Hogan	4 episodes
1984	Number One	Mike the Throat	Television film
1986	The Monocled Mutineer	Wall Eye	Episode: "Before the Shambles"
1989	Screen One	Anthony James May	Episode: "The Accountant"
1990	Dear Sarah	Warder Deans	Television film
1990	The Paradise Club	Evil Jim Dalton	Episode: "Lord of the Flies"
1991	Palmer	Clayton	Television film
1991	For the Greater Good	DAC Spittal	Episode: "Member"
1997	Thief Takers	Max	Episode: "After the Goldrush"
1989–2000	The Bill	Various	4 episodes
2000	Frank Herbert's Dune	Gurney Halleck	3 episodes
2003	Frank Herbert's Children of Dune	Gurney Halleck	3 episodes
2004	Doctors	Archie Reece	Episode: "Rolling Stone"
2005	Judge John Deed	Steve Gross	3 episodes
2005	GB3-Being Young	Mr. Elak	Television film

=== Film ===
Year	Title	Role	Notes
1979	Quadrophenia	Villain Club Barman	
1979	Scum	Hunt	
1980	The Long Good Friday	Razors	
1981	A Sense of Freedom	Prison Warder	
1981	Outland	1st Hitman	
1983	Jaws 3	Jack Tate	
1983	Slayground	Seeley	
1992	Patriot Games	Court Guard	
1992	Chaplin	Workhouse Official	
1998	Lock, Stock and Two Smoking Barrels	Hatchet Harry	
2005	Submerged	Chief	Video
2006	The Battersea Ripper		
2007	The Riddle	D. I. Willis	Video
2014	Evil Never Dies	Eugene McCann	
2015	Persian Eyes	James	Short film
2021	Rise of the Footsoldier: Origins	Ian Jarvis	Last film role prior to death in 2025

=== Music videos ===
- 2021: Macky Gee - "Not That Guy (ft. Tempa T)"
