= Tony Scannell =

Irish actor (1945–2020)

- Born: 14 August 1945; Kinsale, County Cork, Ireland
- Died: 26 May 2020 (aged 74)

Thomas Anthony Scannell (14 August 1945 – 26 May 2020) was an Irish actor, known for his role as DS Ted Roach in ITV's The Bill.

== Career ==
Scannell's debut on The Bill was on 23 October 1984, in an episode called "A Friend in Need". Initially, he was signed for two episodes, but stayed until 1993 and returned for two episodes in 2000. He also appeared in the Channel 5 soap opera Family Affairs as Eddie Harris from 1997 to 1999.

== Personal life ==
His father, Tom Scannell, was a professional goalkeeper and played once for the Republic of Ireland against Luxembourg in 1954.

In 2002, Tony Scannell was forced to declare himself bankrupt, owing the Inland Revenue over £42,000.

He was a Freemason.

Scannell died on 26 May 2020 aged 74 from natural causes.

== Partial filmography ==
- Enemy at the Door (1978, TV series) – 1st Sailor in Bar / Gefreiter
- The Playbirds (1978) – Man at depot (uncredited)
- All the Fun of the Fair (1979) – Frank
- The Professionals (1979, TV series) – Man 1
- Armchair Thriller (1980, TV series) – Connally
- Flash Gordon (1980) – Ming's Officer
- Cribb (1981, TV series) – Millar
- Strangers (1981, TV series) – John McCleod
- The Gentle Touch (1981, TV series) – Andy Golding
- Blue Money (1982, TV movie) – Ninian
- The Princess and the Cobbler (1993) – Brigand (re-edited versions) (voice)
- Family Affairs (1997, TV series) – Eddie Harris
- The Things You Do for Love (1998, TV movie) – Tony Booth
- The Bill (1984–1993, 2000, TV series) – D.S. Ted Roach
- Point of View (2004, TV movie) – Stanley
- Monkey Trousers (2005, TV series) – Police Officer
- Waking the Dead (2007, TV series) – Papa McDonagh
- Evil Never Dies (2014) – Harry Payne
- Bendy Caravans and Everlasting Pens: A Portrait of Evered Wigg (2015) – Evered Wigg (voice)
- With Love From... Suffolk (2016) – Bill
- The House in the Clouds (2020, short) – Salesman (final film role)
