= Doctor Who: The Third Doctor Adventures =

Audio drama

The Third Doctor Adventures

Big Finish Productions audio drama
- Series: Doctor Who
- Featuring: Third Doctor; Jo Grant; Mike Yates; Sergeant Benton; Liz Shaw; The Brigadier; Sarah Jane Smith
- Written by: various
- Directed by: Nicholas Briggs; Ken Bentley
- Executive producers: Jason Haigh-Ellery; Nicholas Briggs
- Release date: September 2015

The Third Doctor Adventures is a sci-fi audio series produced by Big Finish Productions based on the TV show Doctor Who. It sees the return of Katy Manning as Jo Grant, Richard Franklin as Mike Yates, and John Levene as Sergeant Benton while the voice of the Third Doctor is performed by Tim Treloar replacing the original actor, Jon Pertwee, who died in 1996.

The first set of stories was released in September 2015, featuring Treloar, Manning, and Franklin. A second and third volume were released November 2016 and August 2017 respectively. A fourth volume was released in March 2018.

The fifth and sixth volumes were released in May 2019 and May 2020, respectively. The sets feature Treloar and Manning joined by Levene with Jon Culshaw as The Brigadier, replacing Nicholas Courtney who died in 2011. The fifth volume also introduced Daisy Ashford in her mother's role of Liz Shaw. The seventh volume also saw the return of Sadie Miller in her mother's role of Sarah Jane Smith, having first appeared for Big Finish in Return of the Cybermen.

== Cast ==
List indicator

This section includes characters who will appear or have appeared in at least one season.

- A green cell indicates the actor is a main cast member.
- A red cell indicates the actor is a recurring cast member.
- A light blue cell indicates the actor is a guest or special guest cast member.

Actor	Character	Appearances																	
Actor	Character	S1	S2	S3	S4	S5	S6	S7	S8	Ann.	Kal.	RJJ	IFW	RIS	Quin.	BD	OV	Imp.	PK
Tim Treloar	The Doctor	✓	✓	✓	✓	✓	✓	✓	✓	✓	✓	✓	✓	✓	✓	✓	✓	✓	✓
Michael Troughton	The Doctor									✓									
Katy Manning	Jo Grant	✓	✓	✓	✓	✓	✓		✓			✓			✓		✓		✓
Richard Franklin	Mike Yates	✓																	
John Levene	Sergeant Benton					✓	✓												
Jon Culshaw	The Brigadier					✓	✓	✓	✓	✓	✓		✓			✓	✓	✓	
Daisy Ashford	Liz Shaw					✓		✓		✓			✓			✓		✓	
Sadie Miller	Sarah Jane Smith							✓	✓		✓			✓			✓	✓	
Nicholas Briggs	Daleks			✓			✓												✓
Nicholas Briggs	Cybermen				✓										✓				

=== Notable guests ===
- Rufus Hound as The Monk
- Ian McNeice as Winston Churchill
- Frazer Hines as Jamie McCrimmon
- Gerran Howell as Kaleidoscope
- Christopher Naylor as Harry Sullivan

== Episodes ==
=== Volume 1 (2015) ===
No.	Title	Directed by	Written by	Featuring	Released
1	"Prisoners of the Lake"	Nicholas Briggs	Justin Richards	Third Doctor, Jo Grant, Mike Yates	September 2015
2	"The Havoc of Empires"	Nicholas Briggs	Andy Lane	Third Doctor, Jo Grant, Mike Yates	September 2015
The Doctor, Jo and Mike Yates investigate an apparently long-submerged temple at the bottom of a lake, which turns out to be a crashed alien ship containing dangerous prisoners. The Doctor's attempt to take Jo and Yates on a date backfires when they find themselves on a space station at a crucial diplomatic wedding.

=== Volume 2 (2016) ===
No.	Title	Directed by	Written by	Featuring	Released
1	"The Transcendence of Ephros"	Ken Bentley	Guy Adams	Third Doctor, Jo	November 2016
2	"The Hidden Realm"	Ken Bentley	David Llewellyn	Third Doctor, Jo	November 2016
Visiting a planet that is about to be destroyed, the Doctor and Jo are shocked to learn that a religious cult is deliberately waiting to die on the planet. Investigating the recent disappearance of an old friend of Jo's, the Doctor and Jo become caught in a twisted alien plot.

=== Volume 3 (2017) ===
No.	Title	Directed by	Written by	Featuring	Released
1	"The Conquest of Far"	Nicholas Briggs	Nicholas Briggs	Third Doctor, Jo, Daleks	August 2017
2	"Storm of the Horofax"	Nicholas Briggs	Andrew Smith	Third Doctor, Jo	August 2017
While attempting to return home after Spiridon, the Doctor and Jo are drawn to the planet Far, where a vast Dalek army is attempting to use the local hypergate to unleash a new secret weapon. The discovery of a crashed alien ship pits the Doctor and Jo against an alien army determined to destroy humanity in the past before the human race defeats them in the future.

=== Volume 4 (2018) ===
No.	Title	Directed by	Written by	Featuring	Released
1	"The Rise of the New Humans"	Nicholas Briggs	Guy Adams	Third Doctor, Jo, The Monk	March 2018
2	"The Tyrants of Logic"	Nicholas Briggs	Marc Platt	Third Doctor, Jo, Cybermen	March 2018
Investigating mysteriously mutated humans, the Doctor and Jo face the Monk, now acting as the administrator of a unique clinic. Arriving on a distant human colony, the Doctor and Jo must protect the locals from the Cybermen when a platoon arrive to retrieve a mysterious crate.

=== Volume 5 (2019) ===
No.	Title	Directed by	Written by	Featuring	Released
1	"Primord"	Nicholas Briggs	John Dorney	Third Doctor, Jo, Liz Shaw, Brigadier Lethbridge-Stewart, Primords	May 2019
2	"The Scream of Ghosts"	Nicholas Briggs	Guy Adams	Third Doctor, Jo, The Brigadier, Sergeant Benton, Vardans	May 2019
The Doctor's reunion with Liz Shaw is compromised when it turns out that Liz has become caught up in a military plot to militarise Stahlman's Ooze. Investigating the disappearance of a friend of Benton's leads to the discovery of an alien invasion.

=== Volume 6 (2020) ===
No.	Title	Directed by	Written by	Featuring	Released
1	"Poison of the Daleks"	Nicholas Briggs	Guy Adams	Third Doctor, Jo, The Brigadier, Benton, Daleks	May 2020
2	"Operation Hellfire"	Nicholas Briggs	Jonathan Barnes	Third Doctor, Jo, Winston Churchill	May 2020

=== Volume 7 (2021) ===
No.	Title	Directed by	Written by	Featuring	Released
1	"The Unzal Incursion"	Nicholas Briggs	Mark Wright	Third Doctor, Liz, The Brigadier	May 2021
2	"The Gulf"	Nicholas Briggs	Tim Foley	Third Doctor, Sarah Jane Smith	May 2021

=== Volume 8 (2021) ===
No.	Title	Directed by	Written by	Featuring	Released
1	"Conspiracy in Space"	Nicholas Briggs	Alan Barnes	Third Doctor, Jo, Draconians	October 2021
2	"The Devil's Hoofprints"	Nicholas Briggs	Robert Valentine	Third Doctor, Sarah, The Brigadier	October 2021

=== The Annihilators (2022) ===
No.	Title	Directed by	Written by	Featuring	Released
1	"Episode One"	Nicholas Briggs	Nicholas Briggs	Third Doctor, Liz, The Brigadier, Second Doctor, Jamie McCrimmon	February 2022
2	"Episode Two"	Nicholas Briggs	Nicholas Briggs	Third Doctor, Liz, The Brigadier, Second Doctor, Jamie McCrimmon	February 2022
3	"Episode Three"	Nicholas Briggs	Nicholas Briggs	Third Doctor, Liz, The Brigadier, Second Doctor, Jamie McCrimmon	February 2022
4	"Episode Four"	Nicholas Briggs	Nicholas Briggs	Third Doctor, Liz, The Brigadier, Second Doctor, Jamie McCrimmon	February 2022
5	"Episode Five"	Nicholas Briggs	Nicholas Briggs	Third Doctor, Liz, The Brigadier, Second Doctor, Jamie McCrimmon	February 2022
6	"Episode Six"	Nicholas Briggs	Nicholas Briggs	Third Doctor, Liz, The Brigadier, Second Doctor, Jamie McCrimmon	February 2022
7	"Episode Seven"	Nicholas Briggs	Nicholas Briggs	Third Doctor, Liz, The Brigadier, Second Doctor, Jamie McCrimmon	February 2022

=== Kaleidoscope (2022) ===
No.	Title	Directed by	Written by	Featuring	Released
1	"Part One"	Nicholas Briggs	Alan Barnes	Third Doctor, Sarah, The Brigadier, Kaleidoscope	October 2022
2	"Part Two"	Nicholas Briggs	Alan Barnes	Third Doctor, Sarah, The Brigadier, Kaleidoscope	October 2022
3	"Part Three"	Nicholas Briggs	Alan Barnes	Third Doctor, Sarah, The Brigadier, Kaleidoscope	October 2022
4	"Part Four"	Nicholas Briggs	Alan Barnes	Third Doctor, Sarah, The Brigadier, Kaleidoscope	October 2022
5	"Part Five"	Nicholas Briggs	Alan Barnes	Third Doctor, Sarah, The Brigadier, Kaleidoscope	October 2022
6	"Part Six"	Nicholas Briggs	Alan Barnes	Third Doctor, Sarah, The Brigadier, Kaleidoscope	October 2022

=== The Return of Jo Jones (2023) ===
No.	Title	Directed by	Written by	Featuring	Released
1	"Supernature"	Nicholas Briggs	Matt Fitton	Third Doctor, Jo	February 2023
2	"The Conservitors"	Nicholas Briggs	Felicia Baker	Third Doctor, Jo	February 2023
3	"The Iron Shore"	Nicholas Briggs	Lizzie Hopley	Third Doctor, Jo	February 2023

=== Intelligence for War (2023) ===
No.	Title	Directed by	Written by	Featuring	Released
1	"Part One"	Nicholas Briggs	Eddie Robson	Third Doctor, Liz, The Brigadier	October 2023
2	"Part Two"	Nicholas Briggs	Eddie Robson	Third Doctor, Liz, The Brigadier	October 2023
3	"Part Three"	Nicholas Briggs	Eddie Robson	Third Doctor, Liz, The Brigadier	October 2023
4	"Part Four"	Nicholas Briggs	Eddie Robson	Third Doctor, Liz, The Brigadier	October 2023
5	"Part Five"	Nicholas Briggs	Eddie Robson	Third Doctor, Liz, The Brigadier	October 2023
6	"Part Six"	Nicholas Briggs	Eddie Robson	Third Doctor, Liz, The Brigadier	October 2023
7	"Part Seven"	Nicholas Briggs	Eddie Robson	Third Doctor, Liz, The Brigadier	October 2023

=== Revolution in Space (2024) ===
No.	Title	Directed by	Written by	Featuring	Released
1	"Part One"	Nicholas Briggs	Jonathan Morris	Third Doctor, Sarah	February 2024
2	"Part Two"	Nicholas Briggs	Jonathan Morris	Third Doctor, Sarah	February 2024
3	"Part Three"	Nicholas Briggs	Jonathan Morris	Third Doctor, Sarah	February 2024
4	"Part Four"	Nicholas Briggs	Jonathan Morris	Third Doctor, Sarah	February 2024
5	"Part Five"	Nicholas Briggs	Jonathan Morris	Third Doctor, Sarah	February 2024
6	"Part Six"	Nicholas Briggs	Jonathan Morris	Third Doctor, Sarah	February 2024

=== The Quintessence (2024) ===
No.	Title	Directed by	Written by	Featuring	Released
1	"Part One"	Nicholas Briggs	Stewart Pringle & Lauren Mooney	Third Doctor, Jo, Cybermen	October 2024
2	"Part Two"	Nicholas Briggs	Stewart Pringle & Lauren Mooney	Third Doctor, Jo, Cybermen	October 2024
3	"Part Three"	Nicholas Briggs	Stewart Pringle & Lauren Mooney	Third Doctor, Jo, Cybermen	October 2024
4	"Part Four"	Nicholas Briggs	Stewart Pringle & Lauren Mooney	Third Doctor, Jo, Cybermen	October 2024
5	"Part Five"	Nicholas Briggs	Stewart Pringle & Lauren Mooney	Third Doctor, Jo, Cybermen	October 2024
6	"Part Six"	Nicholas Briggs	Stewart Pringle & Lauren Mooney	Third Doctor, Jo, Cybermen	October 2024

=== Doctor Who and the Brain Drain (2025) ===
No.	Title	Directed by	Written by	Featuring	Released
1	"Part One"	Nicholas Briggs	Richard James & Nicholas Briggs	Third Doctor, Liz, The Brigadier	February 2025
2	"Part Two"	Nicholas Briggs	Richard James & Nicholas Briggs	Third Doctor, Liz, The Brigadier	February 2025
3	"Part Three"	Nicholas Briggs	Richard James & Nicholas Briggs	Third Doctor, Liz, The Brigadier	February 2025
4	"Part Four"	Nicholas Briggs	Richard James & Nicholas Briggs	Third Doctor, Liz, The Brigadier	February 2025
5	"Part Five"	Nicholas Briggs	Richard James & Nicholas Briggs	Third Doctor, Liz, The Brigadier	February 2025
6	"Part Six"	Nicholas Briggs	Richard James & Nicholas Briggs	Third Doctor, Liz, The Brigadier	February 2025

=== Operation: Vengeance (2025) ===
No.	Title	Directed by	Written by	Featuring	Released
1	"Part One"	Nicholas Briggs	Nicholas Briggs & Tim Treloar	Third Doctor, Sarah Jane, The Brigadier, Jo	October 2025
2	"Part Two"	Nicholas Briggs	Nicholas Briggs & Tim Treloar	Third Doctor, Sarah Jane, The Brigadier, Jo	October 2025
3	"Part Three"	Nicholas Briggs	Nicholas Briggs & Tim Treloar	Third Doctor, Sarah Jane, The Brigadier, Jo	October 2025
4	"Part Four"	Nicholas Briggs	Nicholas Briggs & Tim Treloar	Third Doctor, Sarah Jane, The Brigadier, Jo	October 2025
5	"Part Five"	Nicholas Briggs	Nicholas Briggs & Tim Treloar	Third Doctor, Sarah Jane, The Brigadier, Jo	October 2025
6	"Part Six"	Nicholas Briggs	Nicholas Briggs & Tim Treloar	Third Doctor, Sarah Jane, The Brigadier, Jo	October 2025

=== The Imposters (2026) ===
No.	Title	Directed by	Written by	Featuring	Released
1	"Part One"	Nicholas Briggs	Alan Barnes	Third Doctor, Sarah Jane, The Brigadier, Liz Shaw	February 2026
2	"Part Two"	Nicholas Briggs	Alan Barnes	Third Doctor, Sarah Jane, The Brigadier, Liz Shaw	February 2026
3	"Part Three"	Nicholas Briggs	Alan Barnes	Third Doctor, Sarah Jane, The Brigadier, Liz Shaw	February 2026
4	"Part Four"	Nicholas Briggs	Alan Barnes	Third Doctor, Sarah Jane, The Brigadier, Liz Shaw	February 2026
5	"Part Five"	Nicholas Briggs	Alan Barnes	Third Doctor, Sarah Jane, The Brigadier, Liz Shaw	February 2026
6	"Part Six"	Nicholas Briggs	Alan Barnes	Third Doctor, Sarah Jane, The Brigadier, Liz Shaw	February 2026

=== The Planet Killers (2026) ===
No.	Title	Directed by	Written by	Featuring	Released
The Beasts of Sakhalin Island
1	"Part One"	Nicholas Briggs	Jez Fielder	Third Doctor, Jo	October 2026
2	"Part Two"	Nicholas Briggs	Jez Fielder	Third Doctor, Jo	October 2026
3	"Part Three"	Nicholas Briggs	Jez Fielder	Third Doctor, Jo	October 2026
4	"Part Four"	Nicholas Briggs	Jez Fielder	Third Doctor, Jo	October 2026
The Planet Killers
5	"Part One"	Barnaby Edwards	Andrew Smith	Third Doctor, Jo, Daleks	October 2026
6	"Part Two"	Barnaby Edwards	Andrew Smith	Third Doctor, Jo, Daleks	October 2026

== Awards and nominations ==
Name of the award ceremony, year presented, category, nominee(s) of the award, and the result of the nomination
Award ceremony	Year	Category	Work(s)	Result	Ref.
Scribe Awards	2022	Best Audio	The Annihilators	Nominated	
