= List of Elisabeth Sladen credits =

List of acting credits for Elisabeth Sladen

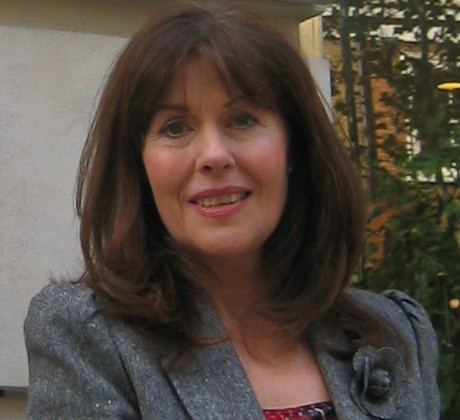
Sladen in 2003

Elisabeth Clara Miller (née Heath-Sladen; 1946–2011), known professionally as Elisabeth Sladen, was an English actress who appeared in films, television and audio drama.

Sladen first appeared on stage in the mid-1960s. She moved to London in 1970 and won several television roles, with her acting in the police drama Z-Cars leading to her being recommended for the role in Doctor Who. After leaving the series, she had other roles on both television and radio before semi-retiring in the mid-1980s.

Sladen returned to the public eye in the 2000s with more Doctor Who-related appearances, which culminated in taking a regular lead role in The Sarah Jane Adventures. She also made regular guest appearances on the main television series and provided voice-over commentaries and interviews for its releases to DVD.

== Television ==
Year	Title	Role	Network	Release	Notes
1968	ITV Playhouse	Hotel maid	ITV		Episode: If Only the Trains Come.
1970	Coronation Street	Anita Reynolds	ITV (Granada Television)		Played Anita Reynolds for 6 Episodes
1971	Z-Cars	Valerie Hollingsworth	BBC 1		Episode: "Who Were You With?"
1972	Doomwatch	Sarah Collins	BBC 1		Episode: "Say Knife, Fat Man"
1972	Z-Cars	Rose	BBC 1	DVD clip	Episode: "Day Trip". Clip on DVD The Time Warrior.
1972	Public Eye	Policewoman	ITV	DVD	Episode: "Many a Slip"
1973	Some Mothers Do 'Ave 'Em	Judy	BBC 1	DVD	Episode: "The Hospital Visit"
1973	Special Branch	Policewoman	ITV	DVD	Episode: "Hostage"
1973–1976	Doctor Who	Sarah Jane Smith	BBC 1	VHS & DVD	80 Episodes, Season 11 – Season 14
1977–1980	Stepping Stones	Presenter	ITV		Co-presenter for four series
1978	Betzi	Countess Bertrand	ITV		TV movie.
1978	Send in the Girls	Beverley	ITV		Episode: "Beware the Gentle People"
1979	Take My Wife	Josie Hall	ITV		Appeared in all 6 Episodes.
1980	In Loving Memory	Mary Bennett	ITV	DVD	Episode: "The Outing"
1980	Play for Today	Jo	BBC 1		Episode: "Name for the Day"
1981	K-9 and Company	Sarah Jane Smith	BBC 1	VHS DVD & Blu-ray	TV drama pilot.
1982	Gulliver in Lilliput	Lady Flimnap	BBC 1	VHS	TV movie.
1983	"Doctor Who: The Five Doctors"	Sarah Jane Smith	BBC 1	VHS & DVD	Special feature-length episode.
1985	Dempsey and Makepeace	Mrs. Barrett	ITV	DVD	Episode: "Love You to Death"
1986	Alice in Wonderland	Dormouse	BBC 1		TV movie.
1989	The Bill	Mrs. Preston	ITV	DVD	Episode: "Life and Death"
1993	Doctor Who: Dimensions in Time	Sarah Jane Smith	BBC 1		Charity Special.
1994	Men of the World	Lorraine	BBC 1		Episode: "Lost in France"
1995	Downtime	Sarah Jane Smith		VHS	Spin off of Doctor Who that was released directly onto VHS.
1996	Peak Practice	Dr. Pat Hewland	ITV	DVD	Appeared in Season 4, Episode 1,3,7 and 9.
1996	Faith in the Future	Sophie	ITV		Episode: "Body Language"
2001	Numbertime	Tara Boomdeay	BBC Two		Episode: "Addition and Subtraction"
2006–2010	Doctor Who	Sarah Jane Smith	BBC One and BBC HD	DVD & Blu-ray	4 episodes. "School Reunion" (which launched her spin-off series), "The Stolen Earth" / "Journey's End" (double episode) and "The End of Time: Part Two" (Cameo), which were all David Tennant episodes.
2007–2011	The Sarah Jane Adventures	Sarah Jane Smith	CBBC	DVD & Blu-ray	53 episodes, and a 5-minute special for Comic Relief.
2010	Sarah Jane's Alien Files	Sarah Jane Smith	CBBC		Appears in title screen of every episode and appears as the presenter in Episode 1 and 4.

== Personal appearances ==
Year	Title	Role	Network	Release	Notes
1976	Nationwide	Interviewee	BBC One	DVD "The Hand of Fear"	Edition dated 13 May 1976
1976	Multi-Coloured Swap Shop	Interviewee	BBC One	DVD "The Hand of Fear"	Season 1, Edition 1 dated 2 October 1976
1993	30 Years in the Tardis	Interviewee	BBC One		29 November 1993. This was followed by two expanded versions.
1994	Even More Than 30 Years in the Tardis	Interviewee	BAFTA		Expanded Documentary shown at BAFTA on 5 November 1994. Additional footage not included in the VHS release.
1994	More Than 30 Years in the Tardis	Interviewee	UK Gold	VHS & DVD Doctor Who Legacy box set	Expanded Documentary was Direct to VHS release on 7 November 1994
1994	Late Night Live	Interviewee	Meridian		
1996	The Secrets of Dr Who Tape 1	Interviewee	Slow Dazzle Worldwide	Cassette Tape	Free with The Official 1997 Calendar: Doctor Who: Heroes & Villains 1997, Tape 1 – The Liz Sladen interview
1997	In-Vision Introductions	Introducer	UK Gold		Introducing her Doctor Who stories & More Than 30 Years in the Tardis
2000	Myth Makers Vol. 50: Elisabeth Sladen	Interviewee		VHS & DVD	
2000	This Is Your Life – Tom Baker	Interviewee	BBC One		
2000	K9 Unleashed	Interviewee		VHS & DVD	Documentary
2002	Chronotrip	Interviewee		VHS	Documentary
2002	Big Finish Magazine CD 2	Interviewee	Big Finish	CD	Free to Big Finish subscribers
2003	Osirian Gothic	Interviewee		DVD "Pyramids of Mars"	Documentary
2003	Serial Thrillers	Interviewee		DVD "Pyramids of Mars"	Documentary
2003	The Story of Doctor Who	Interviewee	BBC One		
2003	Doctor Who @ 40 Weekend	Interviewee	UK Gold		22/23 November 2003
2004	Ultimate Sci-Fi Top 10	Interviewee	Sky One		TV mini-series. Episode "Top 10 Robots".
2005	Doctor Who Confidential	Interviewee	BBC Three		Season 1, Episode 3,4 and 12.
2006	Genesis of a Classic	Interviewee		DVD "Genesis of the Daleks"	Documentary
2006	Blue Peter	Interviewee	BBC One	DVD The Sarah Jane Adventures Season 1	Filmed at BBC Television Centre
2006	Doctor Who Confidential	Interviewee	BBC Three		Season 2, Episode 3.
2006	BBC Breakfast	Interviewee	BBC One		Edition dated 27 April 2006.
2006	Totally Doctor Who	Interviewee	BBC One		Season 1, Episode 13.
2006	Changing Time	Interviewee		DVD "The Hand of Fear"	Documentary
2006	Built for War	Interviewee		DVD "The Sontaran Experiment"	Documentary
2006	Blue Peter	Interviewee	BBC One		Filmed at BBC Television Centre
2006	BBC Breakfast	Interviewee	BBC One		Edition dated 8 December 2006.
2007	Are Friends Electric	Interviewee		DVD "Robot"	Documentary
2007	Beginning the End: Making 'The Time Warrior'	Interviewee		DVD "The Time Warrior"	Documentary
2007	Planetary Performance	Interviewee		DVD "Planet of Evil"	Documentary
2007	CBBC Interview	Interviewee	CBBC		Filmed at BBC Television Centre
2007	Blue Peter	Interviewee	BBC One		Filmed at BBC Television Centre
2007	A Darker Side	Interviewee		DVD Planet of Evil	Documentary released onto Home video.
2007	Celebration	Interviewee		DVD The Five Doctors	Documentary
2007	Teaching Awards 2007	Award presenter	BBC Two		Filmed at the London Palladium. Dated 21 October 2007
2007	TMI	Interviewee	BBC Two		Filmed at the BBC Television Centre.
2008					
2008	Doctor Who Confidential	Interviewee	BBC Three		Season 4, Episode 5.
2008	GMTV	Interviewee	ITV 1		Edition dated 27 June 2008.
2008	Doctor Who Confidential	Interviewee	BBC Three		Season 4, Episode 12.
2008	The Alan Titchmarsh Show	Interviewee	ITV 1		Edition dated 29 September 2008.
2008	TMI	Interviewee	BBC Two		Filmed at the BBC Television Centre.
2008	National Television Awards	Award acceptance	ITV 1		Filmed at the Royal Albert Hall. Dated 29 October 2008
2009	Doctor Who Confidential	Interviewee	BBC Three		Season 4, Episode 15.
2009	Clash	Judge	BBC One		Episode 3. Dated 21 July 2009
2009	Doctor Who Greatest Moments	Interviewee	BBC Three	DVD Dreamland	Episode: "The Companions".
2009	Doctor Who Greatest Moments	Interviewee	BBC Three	DVD Dreamland	Episode: "Donna ".
2009	The Wright Stuff	Guest Panelist	Channel 5		Edition dated 30 October 2009.
2010	Sam & Mark's TMi Friday	Interviewee	CBBC		Filmed at the BBC Television Centre. Dated 8 October 2010
2010	Sidekick Stories	Interviewee	BBC Four		
2010	The Wright Stuff	Guest Panelist	Channel 5		Edition dated 14 October 2010.
2013	Doctor Who The Companions	Behind the scenes footage	BBC America	DVD Doctor Who: The Complete Series 7 (Blu-ray)	31 March 2013

== Tributes ==
Year	Title	Network	Notes	Air Date
2011
2011	My Sarah Jane: A Tribute to Elisabeth Sladen	CBBC	Archive footage	23 April 2011
2011	BAFTA	BBC One	Archive footage	22 May 2011
2011	Review 2011: We Remember	BBC News	Archive footage	31 December 2011

== Film ==
Year	Title	Role	Notes
1965	Ferry Cross the Mersey	Uncredited; screen debut	
1980	Silver Dream Racer	Bank Secretary	

== Radio and CD audio drama ==
Year	Title	Role	Author	Radio Station/Production Company	Release/Air Date
1976	Exploration Earth: The Time Machine	Sarah Jane Smith	Bernard Venables	BBC Radio 4	4 October 1976
1976	Doctor Who and the Pescatons	Sarah Jane Smith	Victor Pemberton	BBC Audio	July 1976 (LP Release)
1993	The Paradise of Death	Sarah Jane Smith	Barry Letts	BBC Radio 5	27 August 1993 - 24 September 1993
1994	Sir Colin's New Clothes	Cast member	Chris Allen	BBC Radio 4	30 March 1994
1996	The Ghosts of N-Space	Sarah Jane Smith	Barry Letts	BBC Radio 2	20 January - 24 February 1996
1998	Bernice Summerfield -Walking To Babylon	Ninan-ashtammu	Kate Orman	Big Finish Productions	20 January - November 1998
2001	The Actor Speaks: Elisabeth Sladen	Interviewee & monologues	Sadie Miller & Mark J Thompson	MJTV	November 2001
2002	Sarah Jane Smith: Comeback	Sarah Jane Smith	Terrance Dicks	Big Finish Productions	31 May 2002
2002	Sarah Jane Smith: The TAO Connection	Sarah Jane Smith	Barry Letts	Big Finish Productions	8 August 2002
2002	Sarah Jane Smith: Test of Nerve	Sarah Jane Smith	David Bishop	Big Finish Productions	5 September 2002
2002	Sarah Jane Smith: Ghost Town	Sarah Jane Smith	Rupert Laight	Big Finish Productions	10 October 2002
2002	Sarah Jane Smith: Mirror, Signal, Manoeuvre	Sarah Jane Smith	Peter Anghelides	Big Finish Productions	7 November 2002
2003	Doctor Who: Zagreus	Miss Lime	Alan Barnes & Gary Russell	Big Finish Productions	20 January - November 2003
2005	Doctor Who at the BBC: A Time Travelling Journey Through the BBC Archives	Narrator	Michael Stevens	AudioGO Ltd	19 January 2005
2005	Doctor Who at the BBC, Volume 2	Narrator	Michael Stevens	AudioGO Ltd	29 April 2005
2005	Doctor Who at the BBC, Volume 3	Narrator	Michael Stevens	AudioGO Ltd	24 October 2005
2006	Sarah Jane Smith: Buried Secrets	Sarah Jane Smith	David Bishop	Big Finish Productions	January 2006
2006	Sarah Jane Smith: Snow Blind	Sarah Jane Smith	David Bishop	Big Finish Productions	February 2006
2006	Sarah Jane Smith: Fatal Consequences	Sarah Jane Smith	David Bishop	Big Finish Productions	March 2006
2006	Sarah Jane Smith: Dreamland	Sarah Jane Smith	David Bishop	Big Finish Productions	April 2006
2007	Doctor Who at the BBC: The Tenth Doctor	Narrator	Andrew Pixley	BBC Audiobooks	17 September 2007
2007	The Glittering Storm	Narrator	Stephen Cole	BBC Audiobooks	5 November 2007
2007	The Thirteenth Stone	Narrator	Justin Richards	BBC Audiobooks	5 November 2007
2008	The Time Capsule	Narrator	Peter Anghelides	BBC Audiobooks	13 November 2008
2008	The Ghost House	Narrator	Stephen Cole	BBC Audiobooks	3 November 2008
2009	Doctor Who and the Planet of the Spiders	Narrator	Terrance Dicks	BBC Audiobooks	4 June 2009
2009	The White Wolf	Narrator	Gary Russell	BBC Audiobooks	3 September 2009
2009	The Shadow People	Narrator	Scott Handcock	BBC Audiobooks	3 September 2009
2010	Doctor Who at the BBC: A Legend Reborn	Narrator	Andrew Pixley	BBC Audiobooks	4 February 2010
2010	Wraith World	Narrator	Cavan Scott & Mark Wright	BBC Audiobooks	7 October 2010
2010	Deadly Download	Narrator	Jason Arnopp	BBC Audiobooks	7 October 2010
