= Mara (Doctor Who) =

Fictional creature from science-fiction television series Doctor Who

- Doctor Who character
- The Mara, as depicted by a plastic prop, in Kinda
- First appearance: Kinda (1982)
- Created by: Christopher Bailey

In-universe information
- Home: The Dark Places of the Inside

The Mara is a fictional character from the long-running British science-fiction television series Doctor Who. A gestalt, formless entity, it preys upon beings using their dreams, and is capable of possessing others in order to accomplish its goals. The Mara can manifest in a physical form, often taking on the form of a snake. First appearing in the 1982 television serial Kinda, the Mara would make one further appearance on television a year later in 1983's Snakedance. Following this, it appeared in various pieces of spin-off media from the series, and additionally appeared in a short produced to commemorate the re-release of Doctor Who season 20, dubbed "The Passenger".

The Mara was originally conceived by Kinda's writer Christopher Bailey, who named it after the Buddhist demon Mara. Bailey envisioned it as an entirely non-corporeal entity before rewrites resulted in a physical Mara being constructed; the prop used for the Mara, however, was rushed, and thus resulted in a prop not liked by the show's producer John Nathan-Turner that was also panned by critics. The Mara's later re-appearance in Snakedance, part of a celebration of the series' past, saw the construction of a new, mechanical Mara prop.

The Mara has been the subject of analysis as a result of its two major television appearances, with discussion regarding the Mara's religious symbolism and its role as a symbol of evil in the serials, among other aspects of its character.

== Appearances ==
=== Television ===
Doctor Who is a long-running British science-fiction television series that began in 1963. It stars its protagonist, The Doctor, an alien who travels through time and space in a ship known as the TARDIS, as well as their travelling companions. When the Doctor dies, they can undergo a process known as "regeneration", completely changing the Doctor's appearance and personality. Throughout their travels, the Doctor often comes into conflict with various alien species and antagonists.

The Mara is a gestalt entity that preys upon beings via their dreams, often utilising the form of a snake to do so. It is non-corporeal, and dwells within a realm known as "The Dark Places of the Inside", having been created through the darkness present in the hearts of humans. Bound to existing outside the universe, the Mara frequently attempts to possess others to escape its prison.

The Mara first appeared in the 1982 episode Kinda. The Fifth Doctor and his companions Nyssa, Tegan and Adric encounter the Mara on the planet Deva Loka. When Tegan falls asleep near wind chimes on Deva Loka, she becomes possessed by the Mara. It soon leaves her and possesses a native Kinda named Aris, who begins to stir up the normally peaceful tribe of Kinda people against an expedition of human colonists who are also present on Deva Loka. The Doctor is able to prevent the humans from detonating a bomb which would have killed many Kinda and manages to trap the Mara in a circle of mirrors. The Mara is so evil that it cannot bear to see its own reflection, and thus is driven away from the planet.

The Mara reappears in Snakedance (1983), where Tegan becomes possessed by the Mara once again. Under the Mara's influence, Tegan navigated the TARDIS to the planet Manussa, where a ceremony was to be held to mark the 500th anniversary of the banishment of the Mara from the planet. Using Tegan and a young Manussan named Lon, the Mara attempts to obtain the "great crystal", an item that the Mara aims to use to restore its corporeal existence. The Doctor, under the guidance of a mystic named Dojjen, is able to focus his mind onto a small replica of the great crystal, allowing him to disrupt the Mara's manifestation and dispel the entity.

The Mara later appeared in a 2023 short, dubbed "The Passenger", which was produced to commemorate the re-release of Doctor Who season 20 as a box set. Depicting Tegan after departing from her travels with the Doctor, the Mara attempts to tempt Tegan using images of Nyssa and the TARDIS, but is thwarted and seemingly sealed away in its home realm, though the short ends with a mirror being cracked by the Mara. The Mara is later mentioned in the 2024 episode "The Legend of Ruby Sunday" as being a member of the pantheon of gods that act as recurring antagonists in the series, being dubbed as the "God of Beasts".

=== In spin-offs ===
The anthology novel Tales of Trenzalore depicts the Mara attempting to invade the planet Trenzalore while the planet is under siege from several of the Doctor's enemies. The Eleventh Doctor's name being spoken on the planet will allow the Doctor's people, the Time Lords, to return to the universe, which the Mara wants in order to invoke another Time War on the universe. The Doctor is able to defeat the Mara using the superstition of salt being able to ward off evil spirits, which banishes the Mara. The audio drama "The Cradle of the Snake" depicts the Fifth Doctor being possessed by the Mara and returning to Manussa several centuries before the Mara caused the planet to fall into ruin. The Mara is eventually dispelled, though small parts of it remain in those it possessed after its defeat. The short story Mark of the Medusa depicts the Mara possessing the Fifth Doctor's shape-shifting companion Kamelion, who the Mara shifts into the form of a gorgon to turn others to stone. The gorgon has Tegan's face, and as the Mara cannot handle seeing its own form, the gorgon form is dispelled. Another audio drama, "The Gloaming", depicts the wealthy using a sleep clinic to avoid troubling times in the present, which allows the Mara to prey upon their dreams.

== Development ==
=== Creation ===
The scripts for both Kinda and Snakedance were written by Christopher Bailey. When initially writing Kinda, Bailey was studying concepts pertaining to Buddhism, which influenced large aspects of the script; similarly, other elements from other religious works were included as inspiration. The Mara's name was taken from Mara, a demon which tempted The Buddha in Buddhist mythology. According to Bailey, the Mara was originally conceived of as an aspect of Tegan's character, and the Mara was characterised as an ambivalent figure, with the Mara taking on a different form depending on the host. As development progressed, the Mara slowly evolved into a more villainous figure, which Bailey equivalated to the Christian Devil more than the original Buddhist ideas he had aimed for. Though initially conceived as a non-corporeal being, the script was edited by three different script editors, with the final script editor to look over the script having rewritten the serial to fit Doctor Who's usual format of including monsters as antagonists, resulting in the Mara becoming a physical threat.

Kinda's success resulted in a sequel being created, dubbed Snakedance, as script editor Eric Saward wished to see a return of the Mara and an expansion of Tegan's character via its return. It was also part of a larger theme of every episode of the show's twentieth season, of which Snakedance was a part, depicting an aspect that had appeared in a prior episode of the series, with the Mara being Snakedance's returning element.

=== Design ===
The Mara's physical snake form was originally conceived as an electronic effect but was eventually realised via physical props. Earlier scenes used a small plastic prop and color separation overlay to showcase the Mara growing in size. The Mara's eventual manifested form was accomplished via a large plastic snake prop operated by actor Stephen Calcutt. The prop was constructed by the Stephen Greenfield Association and was strung up by wires from the ceiling. The prop was not ready until the day of filming, and by the time it was on-screen, it could not be changed. Producer John Nathan-Turner was not happy with the prop, and wished to have been able to tone down the prop's color and "make it look less like a pantomime snake". The depiction of the Mara in Kinda would be panned by critics due to the low-quality appearance of the monster. The later DVD release of Kinda would include an option to watch the serial with the Mara being depicted using computer-generated imagery instead of via the plastic snake prop.

A new Mara prop was constructed for Snakedance, this time being mechanical and constructed via hydraulics and air pumps. Color separation overlay was used to make it appear as though this prop was growing from a smaller snake prop dropped by Tegan earlier in the episode. The same technique was used later in the episode to aid in a visual in which Tegan's face was visible inside of the Mara's mouth.

In episodes featuring the Mara, Tegan was depicted with several visual differences while under its possession, most notably including a snake tattoo present on her arm. The Mara is also represented using a musical theme involving bowed cymbals when it appears on-screen.

=== Scrapped return ===
Writer Peter Harness, following the completion of his 2014 episode "Kill the Moon", pitched several story ideas to then-showrunner Steven Moffat, with one of these pitches including a return for the Mara. This was scrapped early on, however.

== Analysis ==
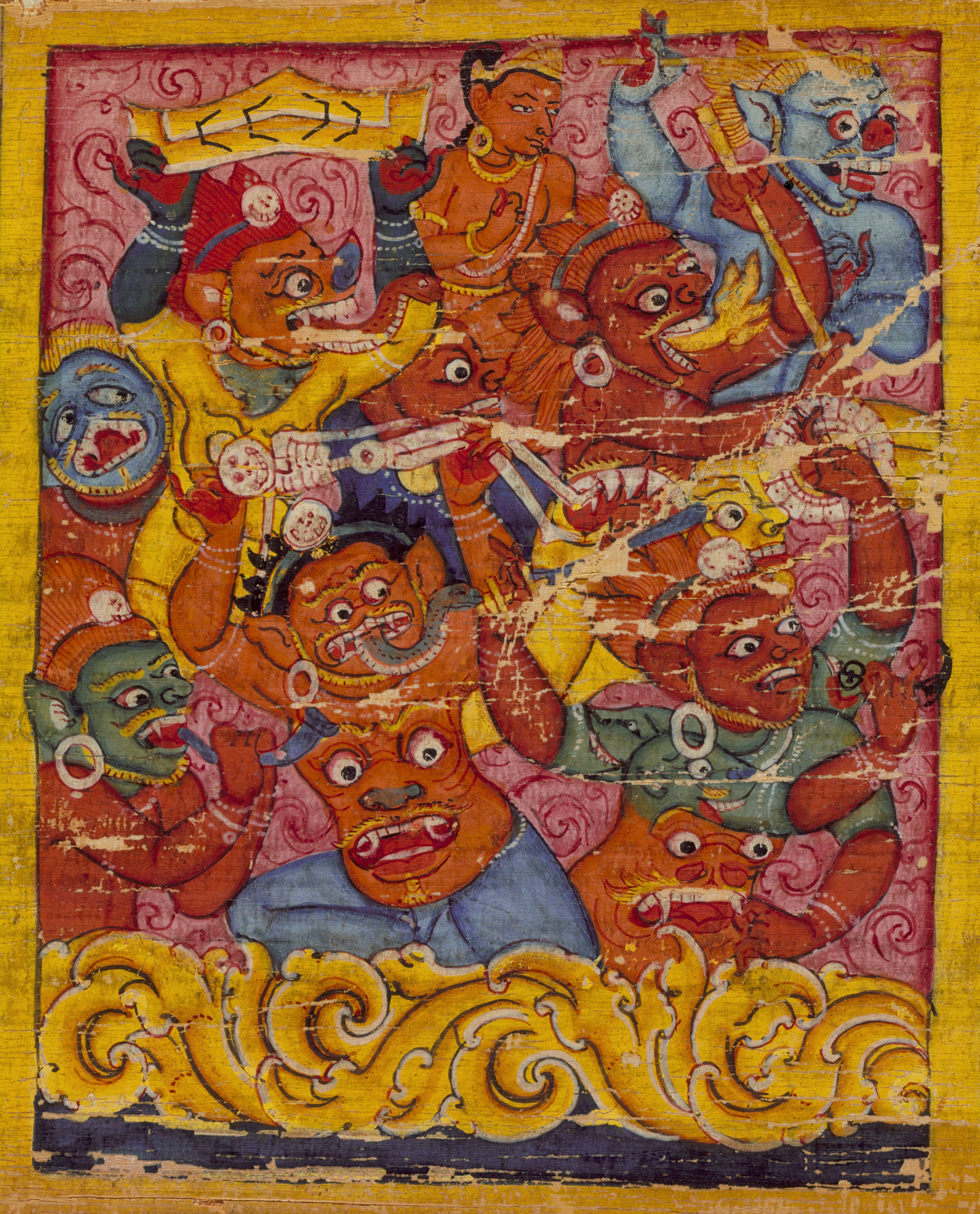
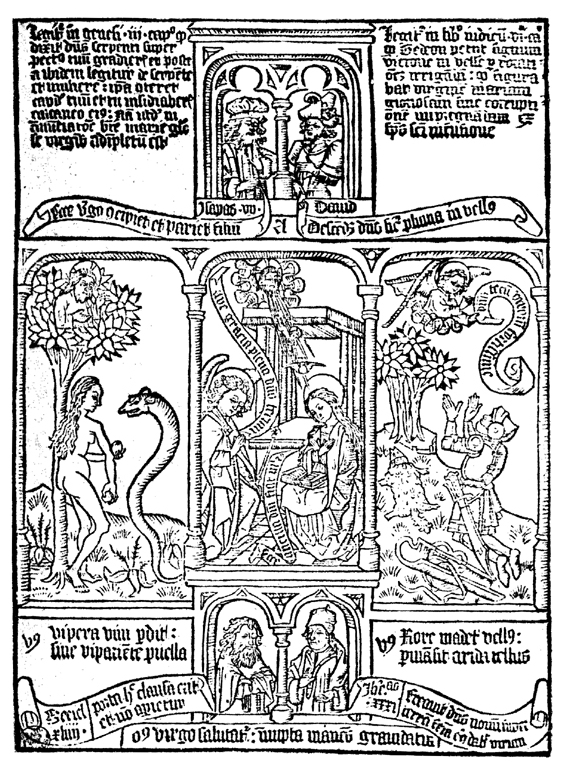
The Mara was analysed for its associations with religious figures such as the Buddhist demon Mara (left) and the Christian story of the Garden of Eden (depicted in right)

Kinda and Snakedance, unlike other Doctor Who stories, were created with the intention of being directly symbolic in their narratives, utilising large amounts of religious imagery. The Mara itself has been described as having several mythological and religious associations, such as having been compared to the serpent in the Garden of Eden, primarily through the Mara's depiction as a snake and a symbol of the evil in humanity; other religious imagery relating to the Garden include the Mara's entrance into the world through a woman, and the use of apples in its stories. David Layton, in the book The Humanism of Doctor Who: A Critical Study in Science Fiction and Philosophy, also described the Mara's association with nightmares and the demon Mara from Buddhist mythology as being examples of how the Mara's stories invoked ideas of mythical elements in a science fiction setting. The Mara in Snakedance was also described as an inversion of the usual hero's journey, fulfilling many aspects of the narrative while acting as a destructive antagonist, with its implied manmade origins in the same story serving as a message to the audience to show that evil stems from and is created directly from humanity. Doctor Who: The Unfolding Text stated that Bailey seemed to have drawn on the concept of the Jungian Shadow for the Mara, fusing it with the concept of the animus in Jungian theory, or the unconscious "male" element of a woman's unconscious, symbolised via aggression and power.

Graham Sleight in The Doctor's Monsters: Meanings of the Monstrous in Doctor Who, opined that the Mara was an antagonist defined clearly through its actions against others, and that its corruption and evil were a present factor across both its original stories, despite the change in Manussan culture depicted in Snakedance between both of its in-universe manifestations. Sleight stated that the Mara's use of language acted as a pivotal aspect of its character; the Mara uses language to manipulate events to its desired outcome and, conversely, the key to stopping it is only discovered through silence. Sleight wrote that this was a radical message that helped contribute to the "atypical" and more complex nature of the Mara's serials. The book Religion and Doctor Who opined that the capability to summon the Mara through a ritual initially used to banish it helped to showcase that the concepts of belief and faith could be used for either good or evil, and still held power even in a world dominated by science. The Doctor's further usage of more mystical concepts to banish the Mara, instead of the usual scientific ones, also helped to act as a middle ground between the concepts of religion and science.
