= Snakedance =

124 – Snakedance
- Doctor Who serial

Cast
- Doctor: Peter Davison – Fifth Doctor
- Companions: Sarah Sutton – Nyssa; Janet Fielding – Tegan Jovanka
- Others: Martin Clunes – Lon; Colette O'Neil – Tanha; John Carson – Ambril; Preston Lockwood – Dojjen; Jonathon Morris – Chela; Brian Miller – Dugdale; George Ballantine – Hawker; Brian Grellis – Megaphone Man; Barry Smith – Puppeteer; Hilary Sesta – Fortune Teller

Production
- Directed by: Fiona Cumming
- Written by: Christopher Bailey
- Script editor: Eric Saward
- Produced by: John Nathan-Turner
- Executive producer: None
- Music by: Peter Howell
- Production code: 6D
- Series: Season 20
- Running time: 4 episodes, 25 minutes each
- First broadcast: 18 January–26 January 1983

Chronology
← Preceded by Arc of Infinity	Followed by → Mawdryn Undead

Snakedance is the second serial of the 20th season of the British science fiction television series Doctor Who, which was first broadcast in four twice-weekly parts on BBC1 from 18 to 26 January 1983.

The serial is set on the planet Manussa 500 years after the serial Kinda (1982). In the serial, the Mara takes over the bodies of the Doctor's companion Tegan (Janet Fielding) and Lon (Martin Clunes), the ruler's son, while seeking to manifest itself by using a crystal.

== Plot ==
The arrival of the TARDIS on Manussa as Tegan has a nightmare of a snake-shaped cave mouth. When she and The Fifth Doctor find the cave from her dream, Tegan runs away and lapses under the control of the Mara once more.

Manussa is celebrating the five hundred year banishment of the Mara with a large festival. In the absence of the Federator, his son Lon is to have a major role in the celebration, supported by his mother the Lady Tanha and the archaeologist Ambril. Lon believes the Mara might one day return as prophesied, but Ambril is unconvinced. The deputy curator Chela gives the Doctor a small crystal called a Little Mind's Eye, which is used by the Snakedancers, a mystical cult, in their ceremonies to repel the Mara. The Doctor realises the small crystal and its large counterpart, the Great Mind's Eye, can be used as focal points for mental energy and can turn thought into matter. He determines this is how the Mara will transfer from Tegan's mind to corporeal existence.

The Mara, as Tegan, and Lon visit the cave and Lon notices a wall pattern which could accommodate the Great Mind's Eye. Lon tries to persuade Ambril to use the Great Mind's Eye in the ceremony, placing it in a position that will enable the Mara to return.

The Doctor uses the Little Mind's Eye to contact Ambril's predecessor Dojjen, who lives outside the city. They venture there and the Doctor communes with Dojjen by opening his mind after being bitten by a poisonous snake. He is told that the Mara may only be defeated by finding a still point in the mind. All three head back to the city to prevent the ceremony. Lon plays the role of his ancestor and places the crystal in the appropriate place on the wall. The Mara is now able to create itself in the cave, becoming a vast and deadly snake. The Doctor arrives in time and refuses to look at the snake or recognise its evil, relying instead on the still place he finds through mental commune with Dojjen. This resistance interrupts the manifestation of the Mara and its slaves are freed while the snake itself dies and rots. The Doctor comforts a distraught Tegan, sure that the Mara has at last been destroyed.

== Production ==
In post-production, episode four of this story overran very badly. As a result, it had to be completely restructured. Originally the door for a third Mara adventure was to be left open, with closing scenes discussing the ultimate fate of the Great Crystal. Furthermore, a sequence in which the Doctor comforts Tegan had to be removed. The scene was reincorporated into the beginning of the subsequent serial, Mawdryn Undead (1983).

Due to industrial action and studio shortages at the time of recording, much of the set used for the production had to be recycled from other BBC productions. The set used for the 1982 A Song for Europe entertainment show, broadcast in March 1982, formed the main set elements for the Federator's living and working areas.

=== Cast notes ===
Brian Miller was the husband of Elisabeth Sladen, who portrayed long-time companion Sarah Jane Smith. He later appeared in "Deep Breath" in Series 8 (2014), as well as playing Harry Sowersby in The Mad Woman in the Attic (2009), a story of The Sarah Jane Adventures, and providing Dalek voices for both Resurrection of the Daleks (1984) and Remembrance of the Daleks (1988). Brian Grellis previously played Sheprah in Revenge of the Cybermen (1975) and Safran in The Invisible Enemy (1977).

According to the extensive production documentation released from the archive as part of the Season 20 - The Collection Box Set in September 2023, Sylvia Syms was offered the part of Tanha before Colette O'Neil accepted the role. Syms would later play the role of Mrs. Pritchard in the Season 26 story Ghost Light. Brian Grellis was a late replacement for the part of 'Megaphone Man' after Christopher Farries dropped out of the production for unspecified reasons.

== Broadcast and reception ==
Episode	Title	Run time	Original release date	UK viewers (millions)
1	"Part One"	24:26	18 January 1983	6.7
2	"Part Two"	24:35	19 January 1983	7.7
3	"Part Three"	24:29	25 January 1983	6.6
4	"Part Four"	24:29	26 January 1983	7.4

In Doctor Who: The Episode Guide, Mark Campbell awarded it seven out of ten, describing it as "less experimental than Kinda" but still containing "some good moments", although he concluded that "Martin Clunes and Colette O'Neill are the best things in it". Mark Braxton of Radio Times awarded it two stars out of five, describing it as "a firm fan favourite" but a "limp sequel to Kinda", adding "where Kinda had bravura performances and genuinely unsettling moments, here the coils of plot and subtext hang rather limply". He observed a "lack of genuine jeopardy, pace or thrills", but described the guest cast as "solid" and praised Janet Fielding's performance and Fiona Cumming's direction of the "surreal possession scenes". He ended by stating that it was "competent" and "colourful enough" but found it "a stretch to understand quite why Snakedance is so beloved". Reviewing the season as a whole, Starburst's Paul Mount singled out Snakedance as the best, calling it "a highly literate and intelligent script."

== Commercial releases ==
=== In print ===
Snakedance
- Author: Terrance Dicks
- Cover artist: Andrew Skilleter
- Series: Doctor Who book: Target novelisations
- Release number: 83
- Publisher: Target Books
- Publication date: 3 May 1984
- ISBN: 0-426-19457-8

A novelisation of this serial, written by Terrance Dicks, was published by Target Books in January 1984. It was the first of two (the other being Enlightenment) to feature Peter Davison's image in the logo.

=== Home media ===
Snakedance was released on VHS in December 1994. It was released on DVD on 7 March 2011 along with Kinda in a special edition boxset entitled "Mara Tales". This serial was also released as part of the Doctor Who DVD Files in Issue 103 on 12 December 2012. In September 2023, the story was released again in an upgraded format for Blu-ray, being included with the other stories from Season 20 in the Doctor Who - The Collection Box Set.
