= Brian Miller (actor) =

British actor and television personality (born 1941)

- Born: Brian Reginald Miller; 17 April 1941 (age 85); Birmingham, Warwickshire, England
- Occupation: Actor
- Years active: 1965–2014
- Spouse: Elisabeth Sladen (m. 1968; died 2011)
- Children: Sadie Miller

Brian Reginald Miller (born 17 April 1941) is a British actor and television personality. His credits include Brazil (1985), Blake's 7 (1979), Doctor Who (including the stories Snakedance (1983), Resurrection of the Daleks (1984) and Remembrance of the Daleks (1988), as well as the stageplay The Trial of Davros) and its spinoff The Sarah Jane Adventures (2009), Casualty (2012), and Coronation Street (2012).

== Career ==
Miller and his wife, Elisabeth Sladen, moved to Liverpool after she left Doctor Who where they performed in a series of plays including a two-person production Mooney and his Caravans. In 1978, they appeared together in the ITV drama Send In The Girls.

In 1985, Miller played Mr Buttle starring alongside Robert De Niro, Jonathan Pryce, and Ian Holm in the Terry Gilliam film Brazil (1985).

Other television series in which he has appeared include Blake's 7 (in the episode "Horizon"), The Bill, Angels and Casualty. He has an occasional role in the radio serial The Archers as Jason the builder.

Miller played Cliff Pughes in Coronation Street, and Mark in Wizards vs Aliens.

=== Doctor Who ===
He has performed in various Doctor Who productions, appearing as Dugdale in the serial Snakedance (1983), providing Dalek voices in Resurrection of the Daleks (1984) and Remembrance of the Daleks (1988), playing the role of Wiston in the 2005 stage production of The Trial of Davros, and playing the tramp Barney in the 2014 episode "Deep Breath".

Miller and Sladen performed alongside their daughter in a number of Sarah Jane Smith audio plays, released by Big Finish Productions. Miller also appeared alongside his wife in The Sarah Jane Adventures, as Harry the caretaker in the serial "The Mad Woman in the Attic" (2009).

== Personal life ==
On 8 June 1968, Miller married actress Elisabeth Sladen in Liverpool. Their marriage lasted until her death on 19 April 2011. They had a daughter, actress Sadie Miller.

== Selected filmography ==
Year	Title	Role	Notes	Ref.
1972	Suburban Wives	Husband's friend		
1974	Village Hall	Mr. Martin	Episode - Mr. Ellis Versus the People	
1978	The Big Sleep	Casino Waiter	Uncredited	
1978	Send In The Girls			
1979	Blake's 7	Assistant Kommissar	Episode - Horizon	
1979	Summer's Children	Fred		
1980	Lady Killers	Bowker	Episode - Murder at the Savoy Hotel	
1983	Doctor Who	Dugdale	Episode - Snakedance	
1985	Brazil	Mr. Archibald Buttle		
1987	The Honey Siege	Ben Rainbow	7 episodes	
1992	The Old Boy Network	Percy	2 episodes	
1993	The Punk	Fishmonger		
2000	The Ghost of Greville Lodge	Party Guest #13 (1939)		
2004	Number One, Longing. Number Two, Regret	Police officer #10		
2009	The Sarah Jane Adventures	Harry Sowersby	The Mad Woman in the Attic, Parts 1 & 2	
2012	Coronation Street	Cliff Pughes	2 episodes (14/09/12)	
2012	Line of Duty	Alf Butterfield		
2012	Wizards vs Aliens	Old Mark	Dawn of the Nekross, Parts 1 & 2	
2014	Doctor Who	Barney (homeless person)	Episode - Deep Breath	
