= June Brown =

English actress and author (1927–2022)

June Brown OBE
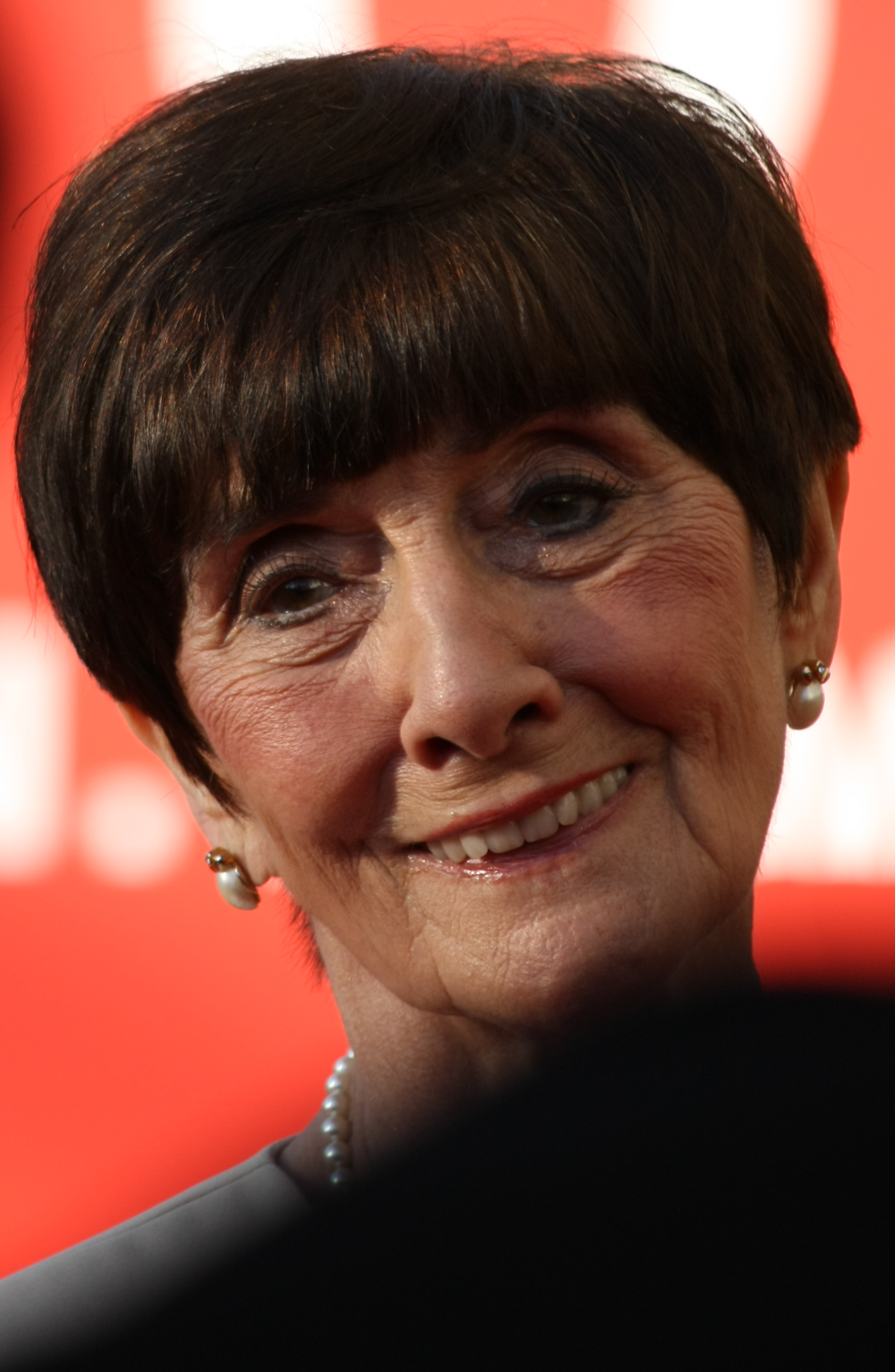
- Brown in 2009
- Born: June Muriel Brown; 16 February 1927; Needham Market, Suffolk, England
- Died: 3 April 2022 (aged 95); Chipstead, Surrey, England
- Occupations: Actress; author
- Years active: 1952–2021
- Known for: Role of Dot Cotton in EastEnders
- Spouses: John Garley (m. 1950; died 1957); Robert Arnold (m. 1958; died 2003)
- Children: 6
- Military career
- Allegiance: United Kingdom
- Branch: Women's Royal Naval Service
- Service years: 1944–1945
- Conflicts: Second World War

June Muriel Brown (16 February 1927 – 3 April 2022) was an English actress and author. She was best known for her role as Dot Cotton on the BBC soap opera EastEnders (1985–1993; 1997–2020). In 2005, she won Best Actress at the Inside Soap Awards and received the Lifetime Achievement award at the 2005 British Soap Awards. Brown was appointed a Member of the Order of the British Empire (MBE) in the 2008 Birthday Honours for services to drama and to charity, and promoted to an Officer of the Order of the British Empire (OBE) in the 2022 New Year Honours. In 2009, she was nominated for the BAFTA TV Award for Best Actress, making her the second performer to receive a BAFTA nomination for their work in a soap opera, after Jean Alexander. In February 2020, at the age of 93, she announced that she had left EastEnders permanently.

== Early life ==
June Muriel Brown was born on 16 February 1927 in Needham Market, Suffolk, one of five children of Louisa Ann (née Butler) and Henry William Melton Brown. Her ancestry included English, Irish and Scottish, and from her maternal grandmother, Sephardic Jewish (from Algeria, the Netherlands and Italy). Through her grandmother, she was descended from the noted Jewish bare-knuckle boxer Isaac Bitton.

Brown was educated at St John's Church of England School in Ipswich and then won a scholarship to Ipswich High School, where she passed the school certificate examinations. During the Second World War, she was evacuated to the Welsh village of Pontyates in Carmarthenshire. During the later years of the war, she served in the Wrens and was classically trained at the Old Vic Theatre School in Lambeth, London.

== Career ==
=== Film and television ===
Brown had a long television career, appearing in three episodes of Coronation Street as Mrs Parsons (1970–71); the Play for Today, Edna, the Inebriate Woman as Clara (1971); the Doctor Who story The Time Warrior as Lady Eleanor (1973–74); the nursing soap Angels; the history-of-Britain Churchill's People; long-running comedy drama Minder; the police drama soap The Bill; and cult sci-fi series Survivors. She had a bigger part as Mrs Leyton in the costume drama The Duchess of Duke Street (1976), and played Mrs Mann in Oliver Twist (1985).

She also played Nanny Slagg in the BBC's big-budget production of Gormenghast in 2000. She was cast in small roles in several movies, appearing as the grieving mother of an undead biker in British horror flick Psychomania (1971), as well as Sunday Bloody Sunday (1971), Sitting Target (1972), The 14 (1973), Murder by Decree (1979), Nijinsky (1980), The Mambo Kings (1992) and the Mr. Bean movie spin-off Bean (1997). She also appeared as Tom Hedden's wife in Straw Dogs (1971), although her scenes were cut from the film. In 1984, she featured in the TV mini-series Lace which starred actress Phoebe Cates.

In 2006, Brown appeared as Aunt Spiker at the Children's Party at the Palace, an all-star event to celebrate the Queen's 80th birthday. In 2010, Brown took part in the annual Christmas special of Strictly Come Dancing. Brown said "I'm terrified and apprehensive about what I've let myself in for, I must be barmy and I'm not sure what's come over me ... I just hope I can remember the steps to the routines. I'm looking forward to working with the professional dancers and the other contestants." Her dancing partner was Vincent Simone, with whom she danced the tango.

In August 2011 she was featured in the BBC's Who Do You Think You Are?, and was the oldest person to have appeared on the programme.

In July 2012, Brown hosted a documentary for the BBC called Respect Your Elders, which looked at society's treatment and attitudes towards the elderly.

=== Theatre ===
Brown was also active in British theatre. She directed and starred in Pin Money by Malcolm Needs in London, and Double D by Matthew Westwood in Edinburgh and London. She played Mrs Danvers in a touring production of Rebecca. Other plays include An Inspector Calls, The Lion in Winter, A View from the Bridge, and numerous pantomimes. During her early career, she played the roles of Hedda Gabler and Lady Macbeth.

In 2009, Brown played Jessie in the West End production of Calendar Girls at the Noël Coward Theatre. Also in the play were former EastEnders stars Anita Dobson (Angie Watts), Jill Halfpenny (Kate Mitchell) and Jack Ryder (Jamie Mitchell).

=== EastEnders ===
Brown was recommended to producers for the role of Dot Cotton in EastEnders by one of its original cast members, Leslie Grantham, who played Den Watts. Brown played the role from 1985 to 2020, with a break between 1993 and 1997.

On 31 January 2008, aged 80, Brown became the first and, to date, only soap actor to carry an entire episode single-handed. The episode featured a monologue looking back over her character's life, dictated to a cassette machine for her husband Jim to listen to in hospital following a stroke. The fact that co-star and close friend John Bardon (who played Jim) was recovering from a stroke in real life added extra pathos to the episode. In 2009, Brown was nominated for the British Academy Television Award for Best Actress. Brown's nomination came as a result of her "single-hander" episode of EastEnders, the director of which she praised.

On 30 April 2012, it was announced that Brown was to take a six-month break from EastEnders and planned to write her autobiography during her time off. In October 2012, it was announced she had returned to filming, and she appeared on screen again from January 2013. Her autobiography, Before the Year Dot, was published in 2013.

In May 2015, Brown revealed that her eyesight was failing due to macular degeneration. Later, in 2016, a storyline for Dot in which her eyesight was deteriorating was introduced. Speaking about the condition in April 2019, Brown said that it had worsened since undergoing surgery in 2017, and that she no longer went out socially because of her eyesight: "I never go to soap awards or suchlike now. I don't recognise people that I know and they would think I was snubbing them."

On 20 February 2020, Brown announced that she had left EastEnders.

== Personal life ==
In 1950, Brown met and married actor John Garley; he suffered from depression and died by suicide in 1957. In 1958, she married actor Robert Arnold. They had six children in seven years, one of whom died in infancy. The couple were together for 45 years, until he died in 2003 of Lewy-body dementia. Thereafter, she lived alone in Surrey.

Brown was a supporter of the Conservative Party and told The Guardian in 2009, "I wouldn't vote Labour, dear, if you paid me. I vote Conservative." Like her EastEnders character, she was a Christian.

Brown was appointed Member of the Order of the British Empire (MBE) in the 2008 Birthday Honours and Officer of the Order of the British Empire (OBE) in the 2022 New Year Honours, both for services to drama and to charity.

=== Death ===
Brown died at her home in Chipstead, Surrey, on 3 April 2022, aged 95. On the announcement of her death, the following day, EastEnders paid tribute to Brown and posted condolences from several of her former co-stars on social media, including Gillian Taylforth, Natalie Cassidy, Lacey Turner, Diane Parish, Emma Barton, Shona McGarty, Adam Woodyatt and Letitia Dean. The episode broadcast that evening was dedicated to her memory. Following this, the documentary June Brown: A Walford Legend, which originally aired in 2017, to celebrate Brown's 90th birthday, and her 2011 episode of Who Do You Think You Are?, were aired on BBC One, in a change to the original schedule.

== Filmography ==
=== Film ===
- Sunday Bloody Sunday (1971) as Woman Patient
- Straw Dogs (1971) as Mrs Hedden (scenes deleted)
- Sitting Target (1972) as Lomart's neighbour
- Psychomania (1973) as Mrs Pettibone
- The 14 (1973) as The Mother
- Murder by Decree (1979) as Annie Chapman
- Nijinsky (1980) as Maria Stepanova
- Misunderstood (1983) as Mrs Paley
- The Mambo Kings (1992) as Portly Woman
- Bean (1997) as Delilah
- Margery & Gladys (2003) as Gladys Gladwell
- Spidarlings (2016) as June
- Ethel & Ernest (2016) as Ernest's stepmother

=== Television ===
- The Rough and Ready Lot (1959) as Chica
- Coronation Street (1970–1971) as Mrs. Parsons (3 episodes)
- Edna, the Inebriate Woman (1971) as Clara
- Doctor Who (The Time Warrior serial) (1973–1974) as Lady Eleanor (4 episodes)
- South Riding (1974) as Lily Sawdon (4 episodes)
- Special Branch (1974) as Chrissy (1 episode)
- Churchill's People (1975) as Agnes Paston (1 episode)
- The Sweeney (1975) as Mrs Martin (1 episode)
- The Prince and the Pauper (1976) as Mother Canty (5 episodes)
- The Duchess of Duke Street (1976–1977) as Mrs Violet Leyton (6 episodes)
- Survivors (1977) as Susan (1 episode)
- Play for Today (1979) as Melanie (1 episode "Instant Enlightenment Including VAT")
- God's Wonderful Railway (1980) as Elsie Grant (3 episodes)
- Instant Enlightenment Including VAT (1980) as Melanie
- Lace (1984) as Mrs Trelawney (2 episodes)
- Minder (1984) as Joany (1 episode)
- The Bill (1984) as Mrs Doleman (1 episode)
- Oliver Twist (1985) as Mrs Mann (1 episode)
- EastEnders (1985–1993, 1997–2020) as Dot Cotton (2,884 episodes)
- Ain't Misbehavin' (1997) as Mrs Jilkes (2 episodes)
- Gormenghast (2000) as Nannie Slagg (2 episodes)
- Heading Out (2013) as Sozzie (1 episode)
- Would I Lie to You? (2014) as herself (1 episode)
- June Brown at 90: A Walford Legend (2017), TV special
- 100 Years Younger in 21 Days (2018) as herself (documentary series)
- Hard to Please OAPS (2019) as herself (documentary series, 6 episodes)

=== Radio ===
- Missing You (2021) as Margey (1 episode)

== Theatre ==
- The Rough and Ready Lot
- Magnolia Street Story
- An Inspector Calls
- Nightshade
- The Lion in Winter
- Hedda Gabler
- A Day Forever
- Rebecca
- Laura
- Absolute Hell
- Macbeth
- Calendar Girls

=== Directed ===
- Double D (play)

== Bibliography ==
- Before the Year Dot (2013)

== Awards and nominations ==
Year	Award	Category	Work	Character	Result
1999	National Television Awards	Most Popular Actress	EastEnders	Dot Cotton	Nominated
2000	National Television Awards	Most Popular Actress	EastEnders	Dot Cotton	Nominated
2000	The British Soap Awards	Best Actress	EastEnders	Dot Cotton	Nominated
2000	The British Soap Awards	Best Single Episode – Ethel's Emotional Death	EastEnders	Dot Cotton	Nominated
2000	The British Soap Awards	Best On-Screen Partnership – shared with Gretchen Franklin	EastEnders	Dot Cotton	Nominated
2000	TV Quick and TV Choice Awards	Best Actress	EastEnders	Dot Cotton	Won
2001	National Television Awards	Most Popular Actress	EastEnders	Dot Cotton	Nominated
2001	British Soap Awards	Best Actress	EastEnders	Dot Cotton	Nominated
2001	British Soap Awards	Best Dramatic Performance	EastEnders	Dot Cotton	Nominated
2001	British Soap Awards	Hero of the Year	EastEnders	Dot Cotton	Nominated
2001	British Soap Awards	Best Storyline – Dot's Schizophrenia Plot	EastEnders	Dot Cotton	Nominated
2001	Inside Soap Awards	Best Actress	EastEnders	Dot Cotton	Won
2001	Inside Soap Awards	Best Storyline – Dot's Schizophrenia Plot	EastEnders	Dot Cotton	Won
2001	TV Quick and TV Choice Awards	Best Actress	EastEnders	Dot Cotton	Nominated
2002	National Television Awards	Most Popular Actress	EastEnders	Dot Cotton	Nominated
2002	British Soap Awards	Best Actress	EastEnders	Dot Cotton	Nominated
2002	British Soap Awards	Best On-Screen Partnership – shared with John Bardon	EastEnders	Dot Cotton	Won
2004	British Soap Awards	Best Actress	EastEnders	Dot Cotton	Nominated
2005	National Television Awards	Most Popular Actress	EastEnders	Dot Cotton	Nominated
2005	British Soap Awards	Best Actress	EastEnders	Dot Cotton	Nominated
2005	British Soap Awards	Best On-Screen Partnership – shared with John Bardon	EastEnders	Dot Cotton	Won
2005	British Soap Awards	Lifetime Achievement Award	EastEnders	Dot Cotton	Won
2005	Inside Soap Awards	Best Actress	EastEnders	Dot Cotton	Won
2005	Inside Soap Awards	Best Couple – shared with John Bardon	EastEnders	Dot Cotton	Won
2005	TV Quick and TV Choice Awards	Best Actress	EastEnders	Dot Cotton	Nominated
2005	TV Quick and TV Choice Awards	Best Soap Storyline – Dot's Cancer	EastEnders	Dot Cotton	Nominated
2007	National Television Awards	Most Popular Actress	EastEnders	Dot Cotton	Nominated
2008	TRIC Awards	Best TV Personality	EastEnders	Dot Cotton	Nominated
2009	National Television Awards	Serial Drama Performance	EastEnders	Dot Cotton	Nominated
2009	BAFTA Television Awards	Actress in a Leading Role	EastEnders	Dot Cotton	Nominated
