= Sadie Miller =

English actress, writer (born 1985)

- Born: Sadie Isabelle Amy Miller; 25 February 1985 (age 41); Hammersmith, London, England
- Occupations: Actress, voice actress, novelist
- Years active: 1993–present
- Children: 2
- Parents: Brian Miller (father); Elisabeth Sladen (mother)

Sadie Isabelle Amy Miller (born 25 February 1985) is an English actress and author. She is known for her portrayal of Natalie Redfern in the Sarah Jane Smith audio drama series by Big Finish; her novel, Moon Blink, from Candy Jar Books's series, Lethbridge-Stewart; as well as her association with the science fiction series Doctor Who. She is the daughter of actors Brian Miller and Elisabeth Sladen.

== Biography and career ==
As a child, Miller did extensive voice work. At eight years old, she made her TV debut as Penny, the on-screen daughter of Minnie Driver's character, Sally, in the BBC Screen One film Royal Celebration. She appeared alongside her mother in the retrospective documentary Doctor Who: Thirty Years in the TARDIS (1993), wearing a replica of her mother's "Andy Pandy" striped dungarees from the Doctor Who serial, The Hand of Fear (1976). She also played Natalie Redfern in both series of Sarah Jane Smith for Big Finish Productions in 2002 and 2006, and wrote several monologues for her mother on the audio production,The Actor Speaks.

In the early 2010s, Miller wrote several short stories, novellas, novels, and poems for several magazines and other publishings, such as Aurum Press, and The Oddville Press. Sadie's short story "Scarborough in July", as a part of the short stories collection, Beside the Seaside, compiled by Scott Harrison, has been described as "a bittersweet tale of loss, love and loneliness among the vacationing crowds", according to the Telegraph & Argus.

In April 2016, Miller published her debut novel as the first book of the second series of the Lethbridge-Stewart novels, Moon Blink, with the publishing house Candy Jar Books. She explained her comeback from her association with Doctor Who, as an author: "...I feel that the time is right to reconnect with Doctor Who, and the fans. My dad did so last year with an appearance in Peter Capaldi’s first episode, and so now it’s my turn."

In 2021 Miller took over for her mother in the role of Sarah Jane Smith for the Doctor Who Big Finish Productions audio dramas, first with Tom Baker as the Fourth Doctor in Return of the Cybermen, then with Tim Treloar as the Third Doctor in The Third Doctor Adventures.

In 2024, her one-woman show, A Girl is a Haunted House, appeared as part of the Brighton Fringe festival and at the Etcetera Theatre as part of the Camden Fringe Festival. Her play, The Mermaid’s Mirror, was long-listed by the Women in Theatre Lab project.

In 2026 she started to read stories for the indie channel Divas, Dinosaurs and Demons which also features former Doctor Who alumni Sophie Aldred as a reader.

== Personal life ==
Miller completed courses with the National Youth Theatre, the Royal Court Theatre's Young Writer's Programme, and RADA's Shakespeare Course. She earned a BA degree in English and Related Literature from the University of York and an MA in Performance from Drama Studio London.

According to her mother's autobiography, she was due to be born on her mother's 39th birthday, 1 February 1985.
