= List of Coronation Street characters introduced in 1970 =

Coronation Street is a British soap opera created by writer Tony Warren. It was first broadcast on ITV on 9 December 1960. The following is a list of characters that first appeared in 1970, by order of first appearance.

== Anita Reynolds ==
Anita Reynolds
- Coronation Street character
- Portrayed by: Elisabeth Sladen
- First appearance: 5 January 1970
- Last appearance: 21 January 1970
- Introduced by: H.V. Kershaw
In-universe information
- Occupation: Barmaid

Anita Reynolds, played by Elisabeth Sladen, made her first screen appearance on 5 January 1970. Coronation Street marked Sladen's second television appearance, after previously taking a minor part in an episode of ITV Playhouse. Sladen's character became a love interest for established character Len Fairclough (Peter Adamson), "even though the firebrand builder had gone to school with her father." In 2009, Sladen recalled "In Corrie, I played Anita Reynolds, Len Fairclough's new girlfriend, and I was in it for five or six episodes."

Anita worked at the Flying Horse pub. When Annie Walker (Doris Speed), landlady of the Rovers Return, alienates her customers, the Flying Horse briefly becomes the first choice for the Rovers regulars, including Len Fairclough. Even though Len was nearly twenty years older than Anita, they put aside the age gap as they both like each other. Anita refuses to answer questions about the relationship from customers and even warns Maggie Clegg (Irene Sutcliffe) away from Len. Anita and Len go on a double date with Elsie Tanner (Pat Phoenix) and Alan Howard (Alan Browning). Anita talks with Elsie and impresses her. Anita asks Len to meet her parents, but Len begins to worry about the age gap and believes meeting Anita's parents would only increase his fears. Anita accepts Len's marriage proposal, but he gets cold feet and admits to Anita that he has doubts about their relationship. Len suggests they have a long engagement, but Anita makes it clear that she wants to get married and breaks up with him.

== Frank Bradley ==
Frank Bradley
- Coronation Street character
- Portrayed by: Tommy Boyle
- Duration: 1970–1971, 1975
- First appearance: 8 July 1970
- Last appearance: 17 November 1975
- Introduced by: June Howson
In-universe information
- Occupation: Brewery drayman

Frank Bradley, played by Tommy Boyle, made his first screen appearance on 8 July 1970. Frank and his friend Jud Johnson turned up looking for Ray Langton (Neville Buswell) and, after swearing that they were reformed characters, talked Ray into giving them a job. Ray employed Frank and Jud to build a display cabinet for Ernest Bishop's (Stephen Hancock) shop, but they stole a camera and threatened to pin the blame on Ray, unless he helped them with a robbery. Ken Barlow (William Roache) scared Frank and Jed off by posing as a policeman. A newly returned Bet Lynch (Julie Goodyear) was not put off by Frank's past and embarked on a "passionate affair" with him. At nineteen, Frank was almost half Bet's age and she was worried that he would leave her. Bet tried to get Frank to commit to her, but he felt trapped and broke off the relationship.

== Tony Parsons ==
Tony Parsons
- Coronation Street character
- Portrayed by: David Hill
- Duration: 1970–1971
- First appearance: 5 August 1970
- Last appearance: 10 February 1971
- Introduced by: H.V. Kershaw
In-universe information
- Father: Phil Parsons
- Mother: Mrs Parsons

Tony Parsons was a young boy who received harmonium lessons from Ena Sharples in 1970. Although Tony had broken into the Victoria Street Mission on 5 August 1970, Ena wanted to nurture his talent and as she was an experienced player she took Tony under her wing and got him a scholarship at a music college. In February 1971, Tony gave his first public performance at the college and Ena was in attendance, along with Tony's mother Mrs Parsons.

== Mrs Parsons ==
Mrs Parsons
- Coronation Street character
- Portrayed by: June Brown
- Duration: 1970–1971
- First appearance: 19 August 1970
- Last appearance: 10 February 1971
- Introduced by: June Howson
In-universe information
- Husband: Phil Parsons
- Sons: Tony Parsons

Mrs Parsons, played by June Brown, made her first screen appearance on 19 August 1970. Brown appeared as Mrs Parsons for three episodes. In 1985, she joined newly launched soap opera EastEnders as Dot Cotton. Dot stated that she was a fan of Coronation Street in 2010, to mark the serial's 50th anniversary.

Mrs Parsons was the mother of Tony Parsons (David Hill), a young boy who received harmonium lessons from Ena Sharples (Violet Carson) in 1970. Ena was keen that Tony's talent be encouraged and was delighted to meet Mrs Parsons so they could talk about her son. The following year, Mrs Parsons and Ena went to Tony's first public concert at his music college, where Ena had got him a scholarship the year before.

== Mark Howard ==
Mark Howard
- Coronation Street character
- Portrayed by: Nicholas Jones
- First appearance: 21 October 1970
- Last appearance: 18 November 1970
- Introduced by: H.V. Kershaw
In-universe information
- Father: Alan Howard
- Mother: Laura Howard
- Stepmother: Elsie Howard (1970–1978)

Mark Howard was Alan Howard's son from his first marriage to Laura. Tall, blonde and self-assured, he arrived without any announcement at Number 11 one night in October 1970 to the amazement of stepmother Elsie, who was totally unaware he existed in the first place. Mark was 18 years old and studying textile technology at college for three years. He had chosen that over civil engineering to be near his dad, keen to rebuild their relationship which had been fractured after his divorce from his mother, who had refused to allow father and son to see each other. Elsie and Mark were studiously polite to each other – her thoughts were preoccupied with the fact that Alan had been keeping secrets from her while he seemed to find it difficult to warm to the woman who had supplanted his mother in Alan's affections. Nevertheless, she agreed to Mark staying with them while he found digs, while letting rip at Alan for not being truthful with her.

Mark quickly settled into No.11 but all the time there was an edge to his relationship with Elsie, not helped by him telling her how much Alan had loved Laura. Elsie was not fooled and sensed that Mark was making a hopeless attempt to reconcile his parents though Alan assured her that there was no chance of that happening. Mark made a good impression in the Rovers where Annie Walker concluded that he was a nice young man and looked on favourably when he chatted up her ward Lucille Hewitt. For her part, although she was interested in him, in the main Lucille agreed to go out with him to spite Ray Langton who she still held a candle for. The date was initially a success with Lucille being charmed by his manners though as the night wore on he upset her with his crude jokes and she confided in a worried Elsie that she thought he had a dark side to his character, going so far as to describe him as "dangerous". When pushed, she admitted to Elsie that Mark had asked Lucille for sex on their first date, using offensive language to do so. That same night, Mark revealed his true colours: he and Alan made arrangements to go to a football match but Mark had cottoned on to the fact that Elsie and Len Fairclough were old friends. He cried off the match at the last minute and quietly entered No.11, knowing that Len was visiting Elsie. Stood in the hallway, he listened at the closed doorway to the back room as Len and Elsie chatted, swapping their old suggestive banter between one another. Mark eagerly reported the conversation back to his father, putting on a front of being shocked at what he had heard. Alan asked Elsie what was going on and, in turn, she confronted Mark who denied the conversation. He told her that all he wanted was for his father to be happy, but told her obliquely that she wasn't the one to do that. She walked out on the two men and Alan, at last starting to see what was happening, told his son that he wouldn't let him come between him and his new wife and there was no way he was returning to Laura. Mark walked out on his father and Alan and Elsie were reconciled.

Unwittingly, Mark came between the Howards again just over a year later when Laura decide to spend Christmas 1971 in the Mediterranean. He invited Mark to stay with them and, predictably, Elsie went ballistic when she found out and the two spent the festive season apart. Mark's character didn't improve and when Alan saw Laura briefly in January 1972, she blamed him for their son's unstable nature and wayward ways.
