= Christopher Bailey (screenwriter) =

British academic and former screenwriter (born 1948)

Christopher Bailey (born 20 April 1948) is a British academic and former screenwriter for television, particularly noted for his work on Doctor Who. He lectures in English at the University of Brighton.

== Writing on Doctor Who ==
The first of Bailey's scripts for Doctor Who, Kinda, broadcast in 1982, was analysed in detail by the first major scholarly work dedicated to Doctor Who. Doctor Who: The Unfolding Text by Tulloch and Alvarado included analysis of Kinda's Buddhist and Jungian symbology and related its tropes to Ursula K. Le Guin. The strength of the script for Kinda led to Bailey writing a sequel in 1983, Snakedance.

Script editor Eric Saward requested that Bailey devise another story idea. The initial outline for May Time was commissioned on 24 August 1982 and was about the Doctor and his companions arriving at the court of Byzantium. Full scripts were commissioned on 16 September 1982 with the new title Man-watch, but the scripts were dropped from production for unclear reasons. Another storyline under the title The Children of Seth was commissioned on 14 July 1983, but not developed further. It was later adapted by Marc Platt for Big Finish's The Lost Stories in December 2011.

Christopher Bailey was the inspiration for the character of Martin Bannister, played by Derek Jacobi in an audio play by Robert Shearman. Bailey had the reputation as a reluctant interviewee, but was interviewed by Benjamin Cook in 2002, and also by Shearman for the 2011 BBC DVD release of his two 1980s Doctor Who stories, collected as Mara Tales.

== Writing credits ==
Production	Notes	Broadcaster
Second City Firsts	"Waifs and Strays" (1977)	BBC2
ITV Playhouse	"Where the Heart Is" (1979)	ITV
Doctor Who	8 episodes (1982–1983): "Kinda" (1982); "Snakedance" (1983)	BBC1
