= Tim Treloar =

British actor

- Born: Timothy David Treloar; Bridgend, Glamorgan, Wales
- Occupation: Actor
- Years active: 2000–present

Timothy David Treloar is a Welsh actor. He is known for voicing the Third Doctor in the Big Finish Productions Doctor Who audio series and for playing Sergeant Major Tysoe in Bombshell. A well known stage actor, he has also appeared in several high-profile films including Maleficent, 100 Streets and Dolittle.

== Career ==
Born in Bridgend, Wales, Treloar studied at LAMDA before earning his first screen role in Bomber in 2000 before working his way into becoming a regular actor seen on-screen. He then appeared in the film Wondrous Oblivion and then the television series Mine All Mine and Bombshell. Shortly after, Treloar appeared in two episodes of The Bill before appearing as a regular in both Casualty and Midsomer Murders as well as a role in one episode of A Touch of Frost. In 2010, Treloar played the main role of DS Simon Vedder in Silent Witness as well as playing a Norwegian terrorist in Mammon, following this with a part in Maleficent.

In 2015, Treloar began voicing the Third Doctor, previously played by Jon Pertwee, for the audio series of Doctor Who produced by Big Finish Productions, starring alongside original cast members including Katy Manning and Richard Franklin. Since then, Treloar has voiced the Third Doctor in eight volumes of audio adventures for the Doctor Who series, as well as voicing roles in Big Finish's series of Blake's 7, The Avengers and Survivors.

Treloar followed this with a two-episode stint in Doctors before starring in Crossing Lines, Dark Heart, Father Brown and Call the Midwife and also the film 100 Streets opposite Idris Elba. He also gained recognition appearing in the stage version of Birdsong as Jack Firebrace and later starred as the same role in the film version which was released in 2020. He also appeared in the film The Haunting of Alice Bowles with Tamzin Outhwaite in 2020 as well as writing and starring in his own internet comedy series entitled Peter Peter's Positivity Programme in which he played a hassled geography teacher. In March 2021, Treloar appeared in the first episode of ITV crime drama series Grace, as well as an episode of the BBC soap opera Doctors as Dave Conroy.

Tim made his first appearance playing Mal Roper in Coronation Street 29 January 2026

== Filmography ==
=== Film ===
Year	Title	Role	Notes
2003	Wondrous Oblivion	Police Officer	
2010	The Duchess of Malfi	Bosola	
2010	The Aftermath	Greg	
2013	The Crown and the Dragon	Corvus	
2014	Envy	Isaac	
2014	Maleficent	Farmer	
2016	100 Streets	Policeman	
2020	Dolittle	Humphrey the Whale	Voice
2020	Birdsong	Jack Firebrace	
2020	Dance	Richard	
2020	The Haunting of Alice Bowles	The Boatman	
2021	Into the Night	Charlie Greenough	
2022	Viral	Caretaker	
2024	Back to Black	CID Officer	

=== Television ===
Year	Title	Role	Notes
2000	Bomber	Corporal Sorrento	TV film
2002	The Bench	Morgan	Episode: #2.1
2003-2004	Midsomer Murders	Thames Valley Constable	2 episodes
2003	Foyle's War	Bob Fraser	Episode: "Fifty Ships"
2004	Casualty	PC Watson	2 episodes
2004	The Bill	Jimmy Cross	2 episodes
2004	Mine All Mine	Cliff Finch	4 episodes
2004	Midsomer Murders	Drinker	Episode: "Ghosts of Christmas Past"
2006	Bombshell	Sergeant Major Tysoe	5 episodes
2006	Casualty	Kenny Huntingdon	Episode: "Angels and Demons"
2006	A Touch of Frost	Gerald Harris	Episode: "Endangered Species"
2008	Doctors	Mitch Wilkins	Episode: "All in a Name"
2009	Lewis	Marc Cotton	Episode: "The Point of Vanishing"
2009	The Bill	Drake Danvers	Episode: "Matters of the Mind"
2009	Midsomer Murders	PC Reg	Episode: "Secrets and Spies"
2009	Framed	PC Gary Evans	TV film
2009	Doctors	Paul Coyle	2 episodes
2010	Silent Witness	DS Simon Vedder	2 episodes
2010	Macbeth	Ross	Television film
2013	Mayday	Searcher	Episode: #1.2
2014	Mammon	Engelskmannen	2 episodes
2014	Holby City	Ray Gleeson	Episode: "Collateral"
2014	Doctors	DI Simon Phillips	Episode: "Toxic"
2015	Father Brown	Father Emlyn Lewis	Episode: "The Upcott Fraternity"
2015	Crossing Lines	Figure	Episode: "Redux"
2018	Dark Heart	DS Smethurst	Episode: #1.1
2019	Call the Midwife	Barney Brittall	Episode: #8.6
2019	Doctors	Ian Stokes	Episode: "Heart of a Man"
2020	The Tuckers	PC Rod Rogers	Episode: "Episode 1"
2020	Peter Peter's Positivity Programme	Peter Peter	All 10 episodes
2021	Grace	Sean Stourton	Episode: "Dead Simple"
2021	Doctors	Dave Conroy	Episode: "The Truth, The Whole Truth..."
2022	Why Didn't They Ask Evans?	Arthur Crowe	Episode: #1.1
2023	Wolf	The Walking Man	4 episodes
2023	Doctors	Lewis Darby	Episode: "Silence is Golden"
2024	Casualty	David Patterman	Episode: "Red Handed"
2026	Coronation Street	Mal Roper	Series regular

=== Video games ===
Year	Title	Role	Notes
2013	Ryse: Son of Rome	Vitalion	Voice
2021	Age of Empires IV	Trade Ship	Voice
2022	Warhammer 40,000: Darktide	Dreg	Voice
2024	Prince of Persia: The Lost Crown	Moon Gatherer, Undead Pirate, Kamya	Voice
