= Elisabeth Sladen =

English actress (1946–2011)

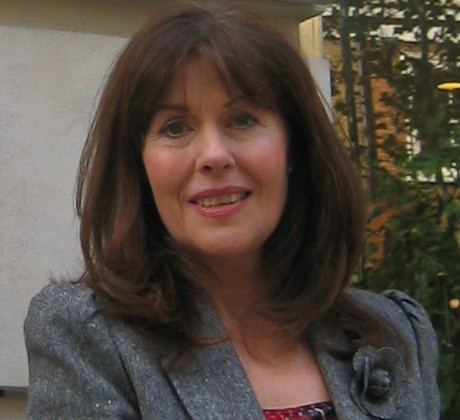
- Sladen in 2003
- Born: Elisabeth Clara Heath-Sladen; 1 February 1946; Liverpool, England
- Died: 19 April 2011 (aged 65); Southall, London, England
- Other name: Elisabeth Miller
- Education: Aigburth Vale High School for Girls
- Occupations: Actress; presenter; writer
- Years active: 1964–2011
- Spouse: Brian Miller (m. 1968)
- Children: Sadie Miller

Elisabeth Clara Miller (née Heath-Sladen; 1 February 1946 (Note: Sladen was born in 1946, though this was often erroneously reported as 1948. Sladen noted this inaccuracy in her autobiography, and it was also noted in her obituary in The Guardian.) – 19 April 2011), known professionally as Elisabeth Sladen, was an English actress. She was best known for playing Sarah Jane Smith in the BBC series Doctor Who from 1973 to 1976, alongside Jon Pertwee and Tom Baker; she reprised the role with David Tennant between 2006 and 2010 and in spin-offs K-9 and Company (1981) and The Sarah Jane Adventures (2007–2011).

Sladen was interested in ballet and theatre from childhood, and began to appear on stage in the mid-1960s, although she was more often a stage manager at this time. She moved to London in 1970 and won several television roles, with her acting in the police drama Z-Cars leading to her being recommended for the role in Doctor Who. After leaving the series, she had other roles on both television and radio before semi-retiring to bring up a family in the mid-1980s.

Sladen returned to the public eye in the 2000s with more Doctor Who-related appearances, which culminated in taking a regular lead role in The Sarah Jane Adventures. In 2010, the show earned the Royal Television Society Award for Best Children's Drama. She also made regular guest appearances on the main television series and provided voice-over commentaries and interviews for its releases to DVD. She died of cancer in 2011.

== Early life ==
Elisabeth Clara Heath-Sladen (Note: Some sources spell her middle name as "Claira", though Sladen spelt it "Clara" in her autobiography.) was born on 1 February 1946 in Liverpool, England. She was the only child of Tom Sladen (1900–1994), who fought in the First World War and served in the Home Guard during the Second World War, and Gladys (née Trainer; died 1978). She was named after her paternal grandmother, Clara Heath. On the unusual spelling of Elisabeth with an "s", her mother explained that "S is for star".

Around the age of five, Sladen's mother enrolled her at Shelagh Elliott-Clarke's local dance school. She entered a competition at a local festival where she recited a monologue from Hansel and Gretel, and subsequently began attending Elliott-Clarke's acting classes. Sladen attended Mosspits Lane primary school in Wavertree, where she played Alice in a production of Through the Looking Glass. One of her classmates and co-stars was future politician Edwina Currie. Sladen attended Aigburth Vale High School for Girls, where she performed on stage with the Royal Ballet every Christmas for five years.

At the age of sixteen, Sladen signed up for three years full-time study at Elliott-Clarke's drama school. In her first year she was put forward for the television talent contest Search for a Star. She recited Portia's speech from Julius Caesar and won through to two heats in London.

== Career ==
=== Early career (1965–1972) ===
After a year at drama school, Sladen spent one summer with the London Youth Theatre at the Scala Theatre. She played a court lady in Hamlet (alongside Helen Mirren) and understudied for Portia in Julius Caesar. Sladen made her first film appearance as an uncredited extra in Ferry Cross the Mersey (1964). Sladen joined the Hillbark Players for a 1964 open-air production of Much Ado About Nothing, playing Hero.

After two years at drama school, Sladen began work at the Liverpool Playhouse repertory company as an assistant stage manager. Her first stage appearance at the Playhouse was as a maid in Twelfth Night. A few months later, she played a corpse in The Physicists. She met her husband, actor Brian Miller, when he was cast in her third Playhouse production The Long and the Short and the Tall. However, she was scolded for giggling on stage due to Miller whispering the words "Respiration nil, Aston Villa two" in her ear while he was playing a doctor. Sladen was such a good assistant stage manager that she did not get many acting roles, a problem that was solved when she accidentally made a mistake on one occasion. One interview indicated that she deliberately made mistakes on several occasions. As a result, she began to get on-stage roles again. She eventually moved into weekly repertory work, travelling to various locations in Britain. After a brief period living with Miller in London, their colleague from Playhouse, Tony Colegate, became director of the Library Theatre Company, Manchester. Colegeate brought in Miller and appointed Sladen as ASM in December 1966.

Sladen's first television appearance after Search for a Star was with a bit part in ITV Playhouse episode "Top of the Ladder", which aired on 11 December 1967. She later played a hotel maid in the Playhouse episode "Chekhov's If Only the Trains Come", aired December 1968. After 1968, Sladen took the lead role of Jo in a production of A Taste of Honey. She also acted in BBC radio productions, including Story Time: Royal Brides (1969) and A Bang with a Spanner (1970). She worked for dramatist Alan Ayckbourn at BBC Leeds. Under Ayckbourn, Sladen and Miller acted in productions through the summer 1969 at the Library Theatre, Scarborough, including in How the Other Half Loves.

She went on to appear in numerous roles, most notably as Desdemona in Othello, her first appearance as a leading lady. She also got the occasional part on Radio Leeds and Granada Television. In January 1970, Sladen appeared as barmaid Anita Reynolds in six episodes of the long-running soap opera Coronation Street. Afterwards she returned to stage work in Manchester.

In 1969, Sladen and her husband appeared in the play How the Other Half Loves; when in the autumn of 1970 the play moved to London, the couple also moved there. Her first television role in London was in a two-part story of Z-Cars. These two episodes of Z-Cars have since been wiped and are listed as missing episodes by the BBC's archive library. She then appeared as a terrorist in an episode of Doomwatch, followed by guest roles in further episodes of Z-Cars, Public Eye, Some Mothers Do 'Ave 'Em, and Special Branch.

=== Doctor Who (1973–1976) ===
In 1973, Doctor Who actress Katy Manning, who was playing the Third Doctor's assistant Jo Grant opposite Jon Pertwee, was leaving the series; Z-Cars producer Ron Craddock gave Sladen an enthusiastic recommendation to Doctor Who producer Barry Letts. Sladen arrived at the audition not knowing it was for the new companion role, and was amazed at Letts's thoroughness. She was introduced to Pertwee, whom she found intimidating at the time. As she chatted with Letts and Pertwee, each time she turned to look at one of them the other would signal a thumbs-up. The role of Sarah Jane Smith was originally given to comic actress April Walker, but allegedly during rehearsals for debut story The Time Warrior, doubts over the pairing of Walker and Pertwee surfaced and the part was recast with Sladen.

She stayed on Doctor Who for three-and-a-half seasons, alongside Pertwee as the Third Doctor and Tom Baker as the Fourth. She departed the programme in the serial The Hand of Fear (1976). While Sladen was in Doctor Who, she attended numerous public events to publicise the programme. Following her departure, she largely stopped attending related events as she felt it could be seen as bad manners to the new cast.

=== After Doctor Who (1977–2005) ===
After her initial run in Doctor Who ended in 1976, she returned to Liverpool with her husband and performed in a series of plays. This included a two-hander with Miller in Mooney and his Caravans. Subsequent appearances include a two-year stint as a presenter for the children's programme Stepping Stones, a lead role with Miller playing her husband in ITV drama Send in the Girls, a BBC Play for Today, a role as a stand-up comic's spouse in Take My Wife, and a small part in the film Silver Dream Racer as a bank secretary in 1980, only her second film appearance.

She returned to the character of Sarah Jane Smith on several later occasions. In 1981, new Doctor Who producer John Nathan-Turner asked her to return to the series to ease the transition between Tom Baker and new Doctor Peter Davison. She declined but accepted his second offer of a pilot for a spin-off series called K-9 and Company, co-starring K-9, the robot dog from Doctor Who. Although it won viewing figures of 8.4 million and a positive reception from BBC executives, the pilot was not picked up for a series due to "logistics and changes in BBC management".

In 1981, former Doctor Who producer Barry Letts cast her as the female lead in the BBC Classics production of Gulliver in Lilliput. The character of Lady Flimnap was written for Sladen, and she said it was her favourite role. She continued to appear in various television adverts and in another Letts production, Alice in Wonderland (playing the Dormouse).

Sladen's next appearance in the role was in the 20th anniversary special "The Five Doctors" (1983). She reprised the role in the 1993 Children in Need special Dimensions in Time, and in the 1995 independently produced video Downtime alongside former co-star Nicholas Courtney as Brigadier Lethbridge-Stewart and Deborah Watling as Victoria Waterfield. This was her last on-screen appearance as Sarah Jane Smith before 2006.

After the birth of her daughter Sadie in 1985, Sladen went into semi-retirement, placing her family first, but found time for the occasional television appearance.

Sladen played Sarah Jane in several audio plays. Two of them were produced for BBC Radio, The Paradise of Death (Radio 5, 1993), and The Ghosts of N-Space (Radio 2, 1996), together with Jon Pertwee and Nicholas Courtney. In 1997, Sladen won Hall of Fame Actress in Cult TV Awards. Big Finish Productions produced two series of Sarah Jane Smith audio adventures set in the present day, released in 2002 and 2006. Her husband, Brian Miller, appeared in the story Ghost Town. Her daughter Sadie appeared in the audios. Sladen also contributed interviews and DVD commentaries to many of the classic Doctor Who serials she co-starred in.

In 1991, she starred as Alexa opposite Colin Baker in The Stranger audio adventure The Last Mission for BBV Audio. Sladen also appeared in a Bernice Summerfield audio drama, Kate Orman's Walking to Babylon. Following the audio production of The Paradise of Death in 1993, Sladen restarted her regular public appearances in the United Kingdom. In 1995, she played Dr Pat Hewland in four episodes of Peak Practice. In 1996, she played Sophie in Faith in the Future, and appeared in 15 episodes of the BBC schools programme Numbertime, which was repeated annually for around ten years. This was her last television acting appearance until the 2006 Doctor Who episode "School Reunion". In 2008 and 2009, Sladen appeared in a pantomime production of Peter Pan at the Theatre Royal Windsor, playing Mrs. Darling and a beautiful mermaid.

=== Return to Doctor Who and The Sarah Jane Adventures (2006–2011) ===
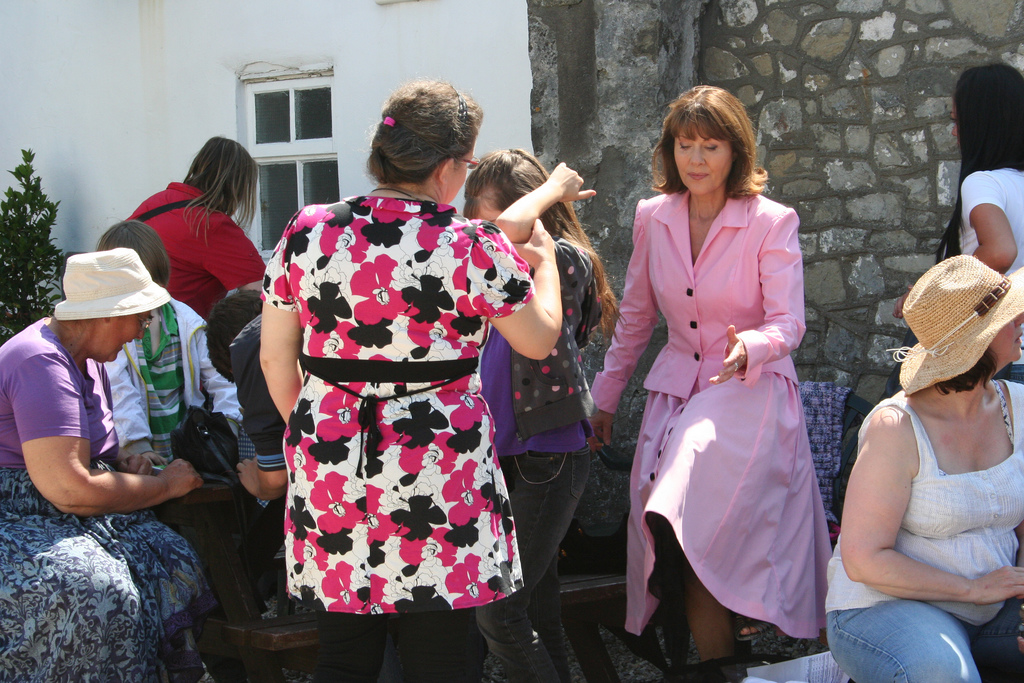
Sladen during filming for The Sarah Jane Adventures in 2008

Following the successful revival of Doctor Who in 2005, Sladen guest starred as Sarah Jane in "School Reunion", an episode of the 2006 series, along with David Tennant as the Tenth Doctor. Sladen worked a lot of the characterisation herself—in the lead-up to the broadcast of "School Reunion" she was quoted in the Daily Mirror as saying: "Sarah Jane used to be a bit of a cardboard cut-out. Each week it used to be, 'Yes Doctor, no Doctor', and you had to flesh your character out in your mind—because if you didn't, no one else would." She also spoke favourably of the characterisation in the new series. Sladen won best guest appearance in the annual Cult TV Awards.

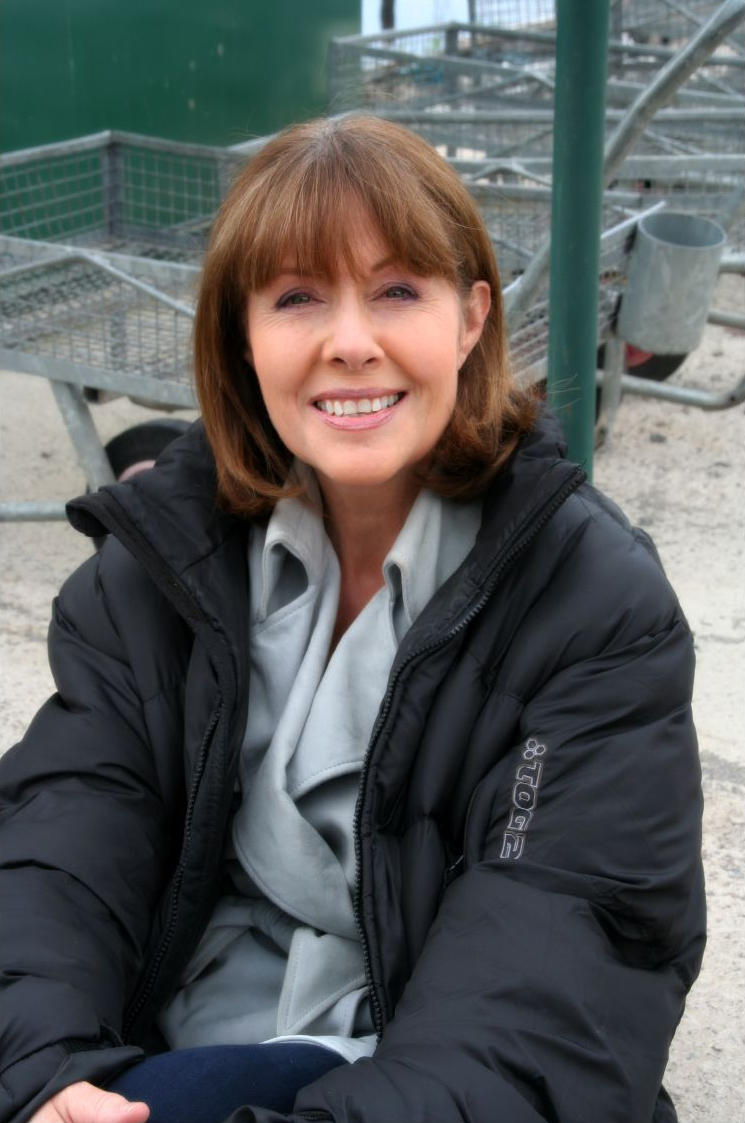
Sladen in Cardiff, 2008

Following her successful appearance in the series, Sladen later starred in The Sarah Jane Adventures, a Doctor Who spin-off focusing on Sarah Jane, produced by BBC Wales for CBBC and created by Russell T Davies. A 60-minute special aired on New Year's Day 2007, with a 10-episode series commencing broadcast in September 2007, followed by a second 12-episode series in late 2008, which carried that same format for the show's third and fourth series up until November 2010. A fifth series originally comprising 12 episodes was commissioned for a late 2011 broadcast, with 6 of the episodes being filmed alongside the show's fourth series, but due to Sladen's unexpected death in April 2011, the latter half never reached production, officially ending the series. The first 6 episodes were broadcast as originally intended in tribute to Sladen in October 2011. The programme won a Royal Television Society 2010 award for Best Children's Drama. Sladen also read original audio stories on CD for The Sarah Jane Adventures, which were released in November 2007: The Glittering Storm and The Thirteenth Stone. This was the first time that BBC Audiobooks had commissioned new content for exclusive release on audio. Further pairs of audio stories were released every year until 2010, all read again by Sladen.

Sladen returned to Doctor Who in the show's fourth series in the concluding episodes "The Stolen Earth" and "Journey's End" and was credited in the title sequence of both episodes. Her final appearance in Doctor Who was a scene in the concluding part of "The End of Time", Tennant's last episode as the Tenth Doctor. Just before her death, Sladen had also been interested in being involved in the Doctor Who Fourth Doctor Big Finish series.

Sladen's last fan event was at the British Film Institute on 12 October 2010, where there was a special showing of The Death of the Doctor, followed by a Q&A session. Her last public appearance was at the EA British Academy Children's Awards on 28 November 2010.

== Personal life ==
=== Family ===
Sladen met Birmingham actor Brian Miller when he was cast in the Playhouse production The Long and the Short and the Tall. Sladen and Miller moved to Manchester in 1966, spending three years there. The couple married in Liverpool on 8 June 1968; Sladen took Miller's surname. Their daughter, Sadie Miller, was born on 25 February 1985.

=== Health and death ===
During a break in production on the fifth series of The Sarah Jane Adventures, Sladen received a diagnosis of cancer. She had previously fought the disease in 1999. Sladen died of the disease in Southall in the early hours of 19 April 2011. She was 65.

== Legacy ==
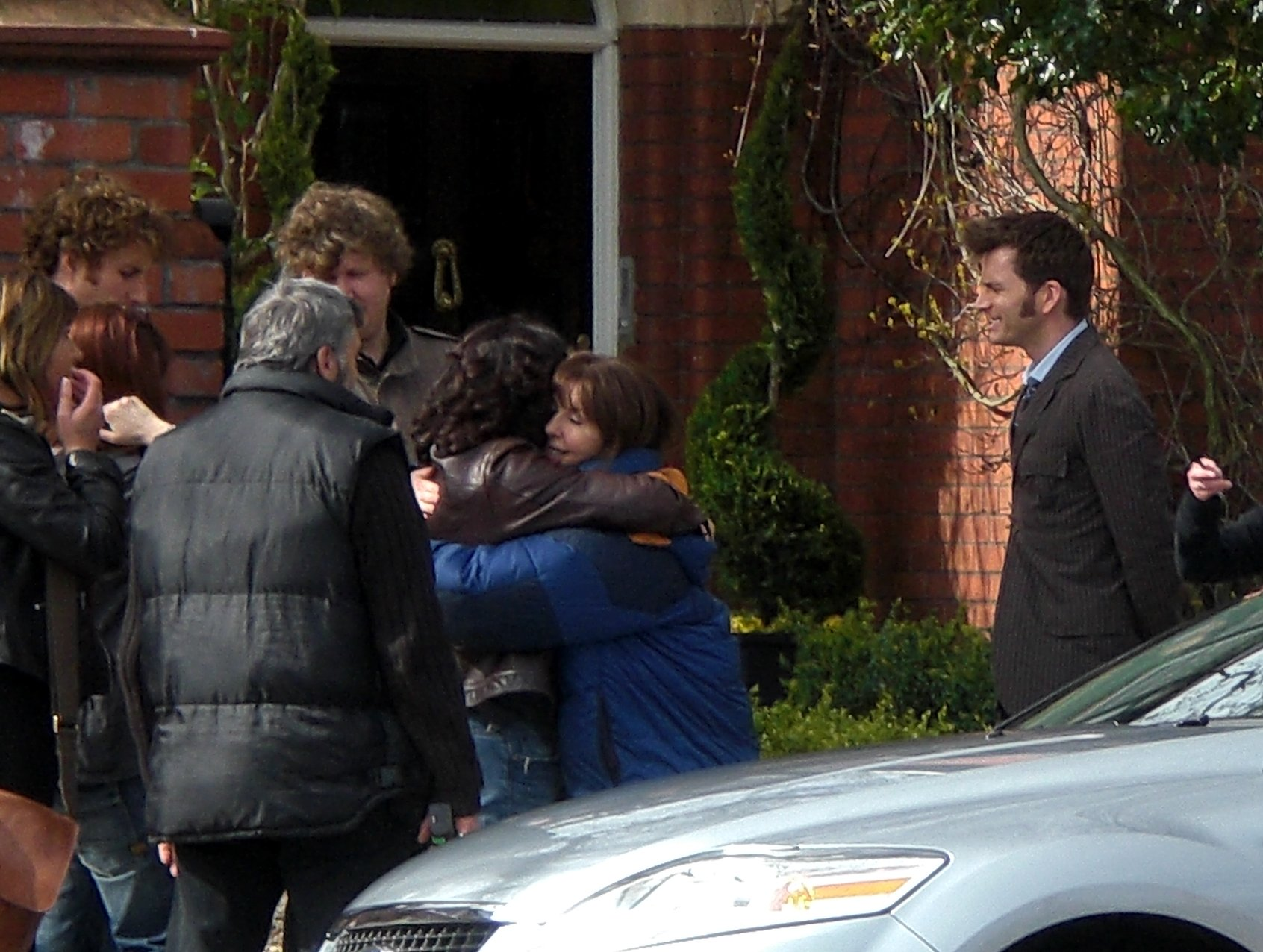
Julie Gardner hugging Elisabeth Sladen, with David Tennant, during the recording of The End of Time on location

Sladen's death was widely reported in the UK: on the BBC Ten O'Clock News; as one of the rolling headlines of the BBC News channel for the day; featuring prominently on many commercial television news reports (including Granada which serves her native Liverpool); on the front page of the Daily Mirror and the Liverpool Echo; and in the obituary features of almost every UK newspaper. Tom Baker paid tribute to Sladen on his official website saying "sweet memories of happy days with Lis Sladen, the lovely, witty, kind and so talented Lis Sladen". Singer-songwriter Talis Kimberley wrote a tribute song, "Goodnight, Sarah-Jane".

The Hand of Fear, which featured Sladen's last regular appearance on Doctor Who, was broadcast on BBC Four as a tribute. The first episode of the sixth series of Doctor Who, "The Impossible Astronaut" (2011), aired on the following Saturday and was dedicated to Sladen's memory. The special programme My Sarah Jane: A Tribute to Elisabeth Sladen was aired on CBBC immediately afterwards. At the British Academy of Film and Television Arts, during the film clips of people who had died in the past year, Sladen was the final person to be shown. The Doctor's companion Clara Oswald (Jenna Coleman) was introduced in 2012; this was interpreted as a tribute to Sladen, whose middle name was Clara.

Sladen's autobiography, co-written with Jeff Hudson, was posthumously published by Aurum Press Ltd in November 2011. Its foreword was written by fellow Doctor Who actor David Tennant. An audiobook of the autobiography, read by fellow Doctor Who actor Caroline John, was released by the BBC on 1 December 2011.

In April 2020, it was announced that Sadie Miller would succeed her mother in the role of Sarah Jane Smith in Big Finish Productions' Doctor Who audio dramas.
