= Doctor Who series 5 =

2010 season of British sci-fi TV series

Doctor Who
- Series 5
- DVD box set cover art
- Showrunner: Steven Moffat
- Starring: Matt Smith; Karen Gillan
- No. of stories: 10
- No. of episodes: 13

Release
- Original network: BBC One; BBC HD
- Original release: 3 April – 26 June 2010

Season chronology
- ← Previous; 2008–2010 specials Next → Series 6

The fifth series of the British science-fiction television programme Doctor Who was originally broadcast on BBC One in 2010. The series began on 3 April 2010 with "The Eleventh Hour", and ended with "The Big Bang" on 26 June 2010. The series is the first to be led by Steven Moffat, who took over as head writer and executive producer when Russell T Davies ended his involvement in the show after "The End of Time". The series has 13 episodes, six of which were written by Moffat. Piers Wenger and Beth Willis were co-executive producers, and Tracie Simpson and Peter Bennett were producers. Although it is the fifth series since the show's revival in 2005 (and the thirty-first since it began in 1963), the series' production code numbers were reset.

It was the first series to feature Matt Smith as the eleventh incarnation of the Doctor, an alien Time Lord who travels through time and space in his TARDIS (a spacecraft whose exterior resembles a British police box). Karen Gillan is introduced as the Doctor's new companion, Amy Pond. Her fiancé, Rory Williams (Arthur Darvill), appears in seven episodes, travels with the Doctor and Amy, and is a regular character in the next series. Alex Kingston returns as River Song, a mysterious woman from the Doctor's future who summons him twice in this series. The main story arc, covering several episodes, concerns a pattern of cracks in the universe which are sometimes unnoticed by the characters. It is discovered that the cracks can erase things from existence; this happens to Rory, and Amy forgets him. It is revealed in the series finale that the cracks were caused by the TARDIS exploding, and the Doctor is forced to reboot the universe to its state before the cracks appeared.

In addition to the six episodes written by Moffat, Mark Gatiss, Toby Whithouse, Simon Nye, Richard Curtis, and Gareth Roberts wrote one episode each; Chris Chibnall wrote a two-episode story. The series was meant to be fantastical to stand out from other science-fiction and fantasy shows, and the production team strove for a fairy-tale quality because Moffat believed that media aimed at children were some of the most popular among adults. The episodes were directed by directors who were new to Doctor Who. Filming began in late July 2009, lasting about nine months. The series was filmed primarily in Wales, except for "The Vampires of Venice" and "Vincent and the Doctor" (which had scenes filmed in Trogir, Croatia). Design changes from the previous series included a new logo, title sequence, variant of the Doctor's sonic screwdriver, interior and exterior of the TARDIS, and a change in the theme music.

The series premiere was watched by 10.085 million viewers (the most-watched premiere since "Rose" of the first series), and set records on BBC America in the United States and the BBC's online iPlayer. Although overnight ratings declined compared to other series, one writer calculated that viewership had not changed significantly when time-shifted ratings were taken into account. The series received positive reviews, with praise for Moffat's story arc and the performances of Smith, Gillan, and Darvill. However, reviewers noted Amy's lack of character development and the series' diminished emotional appeal. It received a number of awards and nominations; "Vincent and the Doctor" and the two-part finale were nominated for the Hugo Award for Best Dramatic Presentation (Short Form), with the award going to the finale. Smith was the first actor playing the Doctor to be nominated for a BAFTA award. The series was accompanied by a soundtrack and tie-in books and video games; four of the latter were released on the BBC website and advertised as additional episodes of the series.

== Episodes ==
No. story	No. in series	Title	Directed by	Written by	Original release date	Prod. code	UK viewers (millions)	AI
203	1	"The Eleventh Hour"	Adam Smith	Steven Moffat	3 April 2010	1.1	9.59	86
The failing TARDIS crash-lands in England outside the home of seven-year-old Amelia Pond, who invites the newly-regenerated Eleventh Doctor inside to investigate a crack in her bedroom wall. Since he must use the TARDIS to regulate its engines, he promises to return in five minutes. The TARDIS takes him twelve years into the future, where he joins the adult Amy Pond and her boyfriend Rory Williams in capturing the shape-shifting alien known as Prisoner Zero (who has escaped from the crack in Amy's wall). Failure to capture the alien will lead to the destruction of Earth by the galactic police force known as the Atraxi. After the Earth is saved, the Doctor tests the newly-remodelled TARDIS and accidentally returns for Amy two years later—the night before her marriage to Rory—when she joins him for his promised travels through space and time.
204	2	"The Beast Below"	Andrew Gunn	Steven Moffat	10 April 2010	1.2	7.93	86
The Doctor takes Amy to the distant future, where they explore the Starship UK: a spaceship holding the population of the United Kingdom after they fled Earth due to dangerous solar flares. They discover that the ship is guided by a Star Whale, who is being tortured out of the fear that when left to make its own decisions it will abandon them. Believing that the future cannot go on this way, the Doctor prepares to render the Star Whale brain-dead so it will continue to operate the ship but not feel pain. Amy discovers that it is willing to serve the ship, since it could not stand the children crying because of the solar flares.
205	3	"Victory of the Daleks"	Andrew Gunn	Mark Gatiss	17 April 2010	1.3	7.82	84
The Doctor and Amy respond to a call from Winston Churchill and visit him during the London Blitz, where he has employed Ironsides: an invention apparently created by Professor Bracewell. The Doctor sees through the ruse and recognises the Ironsides as his arch-enemies, the Daleks. They use the Doctor's testimony that he is the Doctor to activate the Progenitor Chamber (which contains pure Dalek DNA) to restore their race with five new Daleks in larger, redesigned casings. The Daleks reveal their plan to detonate a device built around Bracewell (revealed as an android created by the Daleks) and destroy the Earth. As the device begins to activate, the Doctor and Amy convince Bracewell that he is human and the device deactivates.
206a	4	"The Time of Angels"	Adam Smith	Steven Moffat	24 April 2010	1.4	8.13	87
River Song, a woman from the Doctor's future, summons him and Amy to help her, Father Octavian, and his group of militarised clerics destroy a Weeping Angel on the site of the crashed ship Byzantium on the planet Alfava Metraxis. It is revealed that all statues in the stone labyrinth where the ship has crashed are Angels, and are gaining strength from radiation leaking from the ship. As the Angels surround the group and several clerics are revealed to be dead, the Doctor shoots the gravity globe above them and tells everyone to jump.
206b	5	"Flesh and Stone"	Adam Smith	Steven Moffat	1 May 2010	1.5	8.02	86
The group lands on the outside of the Byzantium, having been pulled there by the ship's artificial gravity. A crack similar to the one in Amy's bedroom appears inside the ship. The Doctor discovers that the crack, which erases people and things from existence, was caused by an explosion in Amy's era. As the gravity fails, the Weeping Angels fall into the crack. Amy asks the Doctor to take her home. She tells him that she and Rory are getting married tomorrow.
207	6	"The Vampires of Venice"	Jonny Campbell	Toby Whithouse	8 May 2010	1.6	7.28	86
The Doctor takes Amy and Rory to Venice in 1580 on a romantic date. They meet Guido, a boat-builder whose daughter Isabella had entered the House of Calvierri girls' school. Guido is distressed because Isabella did not recognise him on the street and now has vampire-like fangs. The Doctor, Amy and Rory investigate the school and learn that the city's patron, Rosanna Calvierri, is a fish-like alien and has sealed off Venice in an attempt to make it a refuge for her race after losing their home planet to the cracks in the universe. Rosanna transforms the girls admitted to her school into her race to be mates for ten thousand of her male children who are waiting in the water. Guido sacrifices his life to kill the girls from the school. Rosanna activates a machine to flood Venice, but the Doctor foils her. As the last female of her species, the hopeless Rosanna sacrifices herself to her male offspring. As they leave, Amy asks Rory to stay and travel with her.
208	7	"Amy's Choice"	Catherine Morshead	Simon Nye	15 May 2010	1.7	7.06	84
The Doctor, Amy and Rory travel between two realities. In one, Amy and Rory are happily married but are pursued by elderly people possessed by aliens; in the other, they are in a powerless TARDIS which will slowly crash into a cold star which will freeze them to death. A man known as the Dream Lord says that he has put them in this trap, and they must decide which is real—and die in the fake reality—to wake up in the real one (and escape the trap). When Rory dies in the future reality, Amy decides that it must be fake because she does not want a life without him. It is revealed that psychic pollen had entered the TARDIS and caused the dream state, and the Dream Lord is a psychic manifestation of the Doctor's dark, self-loathing side.
209a	8	"The Hungry Earth"	Ashley Way	Chris Chibnall	22 May 2010	1.8	6.01	86
In 2020 Wales, Mo, a driller at a drilling operation, has been dragged underground after the drill disturbs a civilisation of reptilian humanoid Silurians, and the same fate befalls Amy. The Silurians reach the surface and kidnap Mo's son Elliot. Rory and the Doctor capture Alaya, a Silurian which has infected Mo's father-in-law Tony with her venomous tongue. As a Silurian doctor is about to vivisect Amy (as he had done to Mo), the TARDIS, with the Doctor and the operation's leader Nasreen inside, is pulled underground to the immense Silurian civilisation.
209b	9	"Cold Blood"	Ashley Way	Chris Chibnall	29 May 2010	1.9	7.04	85
Amy and Mo escape and discover that Elliot is being held in an observation chamber. When Elliot's mother Ambrose kills Alaya for not telling her anything, it is agreed that the Silurians will hibernate for a thousand years, since humanity is not ready to share the Earth with them. Tony decides to stay behind with the Silurians to have his venom infection treated, and Nasreen stays with him. As the Doctor leaves with Elliot and the other humans, they find a crack in the cavern. The Doctor reaches into it to investigate, and pulls out a piece of the TARDIS. Before they leave, Restac shoots Rory dead; he is consumed by the crack, erasing him from existence (and Amy's memory).
210	10	"Vincent and the Doctor"	Jonny Campbell	Richard Curtis	5 June 2010	1.10	6.29	86
During a visit to the Musée d'Orsay in 2010, the Doctor finds a creature in the church window of Vincent van Gogh's The Church at Auvers. He takes Amy back to 1890 to meet Vincent, and to discover why the creature was in the painting. Welcoming them, Vincent works with the Doctor to find a lost, blind Krafayis, whom only Vincent can see. Vincent kills the creature, although he empathises with its pain. Before they leave, the Doctor and Amy take Vincent to the present (where he discovers how much people will admire him and his work). This gives Amy hope that he did not commit suicide and lived to create even more paintings. Devastated to learn that he still took his own life, she learns that one of his sunflower paintings was dedicated to her.
211	11	"The Lodger"	Catherine Morshead	Gareth Roberts	12 June 2010	1.11	5.98	87
The TARDIS is thrown into the time vortex with Amy inside, leaving the Doctor stranded in present-day Colchester. He tracks the disturbance which affected the TARDIS to the second floor of a flat, where people have been persuaded to enter but have never left. The Doctor rents part of the downstairs apartment occupied by Craig Owens, who wishes to declare his love for his friend Sophie. When Sophie is lured up to the second floor, the Doctor and Craig enter the flat and discover that it is a time engine (disguised by a perception filter) which has been luring passersby to find a suitable pilot. When Craig does not want to leave, the ship's protocols are counteracted; with its hold on the house broken, the TARDIS can land. In the TARDIS, Amy finds her engagement ring from Rory.
212a	12	"The Pandorica Opens"	Toby Haynes	Steven Moffat	19 June 2010	1.12	6.94	88
River Song summons the Doctor and Amy to 102 AD, when she shows them a Vincent van Gogh painting of the TARDIS exploding; the painting contains the coordinates of Stonehenge. Under Stonehenge they discover the Pandorica, a prison box said to contain the most powerful (and feared) being in the universe. However, the Pandorica is empty; an alliance of the Doctor's enemies arrive to put him in the box, since they believe that the Doctor is causing the cracks with the TARDIS. The Pandorica, constructed from Amy's memories, contains an Auton (artificial life form) version of Rory; he shoots her. The TARDIS brings River to Amy's house in the present and explodes, widening the cracks and causing the universe to begin erasing.
212b	13	"The Big Bang"	Toby Haynes	Steven Moffat	26 June 2010	1.13	6.12	89
The Doctor from the future gives Rory his sonic screwdriver, which Rory uses to free the Doctor from the Pandorica in 102. The Doctor and Rory place the dead Amy in the Pandorica, which will force her to remain alive until her DNA is given to the Pandorica in the form of seven-year-old Amelia in 1996. Amelia places her hand on the Pandorica, following instructions left by the Doctor, fully restoring Amy to life. As the universe collapses, the Doctor rescues River from the time loop in the exploding TARDIS and realises that if he flies the Pandorica (which contains a restoration field) and collides with the exploding TARDIS, it would restore the universe. The cracks are unable to close entirely until the Doctor is erased. Amy brings the Doctor back at her wedding to Rory with her memories (due to the Doctor's last words to her as he was being erased), and the newlyweds continue to travel with him.

=== Supplemental scenes ===
Two scenes were filmed for the Complete Fifth Series box set, revealing what happened between pairs of regular episodes. The first scene is set between "The Eleventh Hour" and "The Beast Below", and the second is set between "Flesh and Stone" and "The Vampires of Venice".

Title	Directed by	Written by	Original release date
"Meanwhile, in the TARDIS..." (Part 1)	Euros Lyn	Steven Moffat	8 November 2010 (home video release)
Aboard the TARDIS for the first time, Amy asks the Doctor several questions about the spacecraft and the Doctor. He tells her that they are in space, leading into "The Beast Below".
"Meanwhile, in the TARDIS..." (Part 2)	Euros Lyn	Steven Moffat	8 November 2010 (home video release)
The Doctor rejects Amy's advances, and she accesses the records of his previous companions. He then decides that it is time to take her back to Rory, leading into "The Vampires of Venice".

== Casting ==
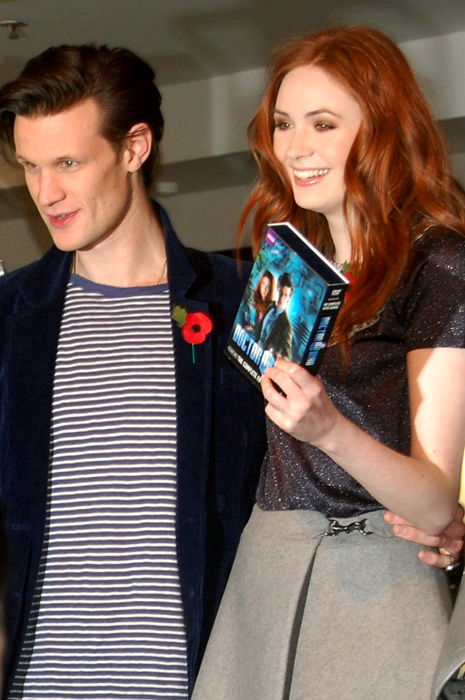
Matt Smith was cast as the Eleventh Doctor and Karen Gillan was cast as his companion, Amy Pond.

The series introduced the Eleventh Doctor, played by Matt Smith. This followed the departure of David Tennant as the Tenth Doctor, who left the show to help ease the transition from Davies to Moffat. Smith's agent called him, suggesting that he audition for the role. Moffat wanted to cast a middle-aged actor, "young enough to run but old enough to look wise". When Smith was the third person to audition, the production team knew "[they] had their man", although he was 26 years old. The producers were cautious about casting Smith because they felt that a 26-year-old actor could not play the Doctor; although BBC Head of Drama and executive producer Piers Wenger agreed, he said that Smith was capable enough to play the part. According to Moffat, Smith did not appear youthful. Smith's casting was announced during an episode of the Doctor Who companion show Doctor Who Confidential, when he described the role as "a wonderful privilege and challenge that I hope I will thrive on".

Karen Gillan was cast as Amy Pond, the Doctor's companion. Casting director Andy Pryor suggested Gillan to Moffat after her performance in the fourth series episode "The Fires of Pompeii" (when she played a soothsayer), but Moffat originally considered her "short and dumpy". He later called her "exactly right for the role", although she played the character differently from the way it was originally written. Gillan auditioned for the role in her (natural) Scottish accent and an English one, and after she was cast, it was decided that Amy would be Scottish. Gillan felt that the Scottish accent better suited her character. A young version of Amy (Amelia) was played by Gillan's 10-year-old cousin, Caitlin Blackwood, in the first and last episodes. The actresses had not met until the show, but although Blackwood had to audition, Gillan recommended her for the role. Blackwood and Gillan appeared together in "The Big Bang", which Gillan initially found "weird" (although the actresses quickly got used to it).

Alex Kingston, who played River Song in the series 4 episodes "Silence in the Library" and "Forest of the Dead", reprised her role in the two-part stories "The Time of Angels" and "Flesh and Stone" and "The Pandorica Opens" and "The Big Bang". Although Kingston did not expect to return, Moffat always intended for River to return to the series. Arthur Darvill appeared in seven episodes as Rory Williams, Amy's fiancé, and was a companion in six of the episodes. Darvill had worked with Smith on a play, Swimming with Sharks. He received two scenes from the first episode and one from the sixth for his audition, but (except for Rory being Amy's boyfriend) he was not informed of the character's details. Moffat noted "just how funny" Darvill was during his audition. The actor felt "privileged" to be part of the show, and was pleased with Rory's storyline. Guest stars in the series included Olivia Colman, James Corden, Annette Crosbie, Tony Curran, Iain Glen, Daisy Haggard, Terrence Hardiman, Tom Hopper, Toby Jones, Helen McCrory, Neve McIntosh, Ian McNeice, Patrick Moore, Stephen Moore, Lucian Msamati, Bill Nighy, Sophie Okonedo, Bill Paterson, Alex Price, Robert Pugh, Nia Roberts, Mike Skinner, Meera Syal and Nina Wadia.

== Production ==
=== Development ===
Doctor Who was renewed for a fifth series in September 2007. Russell T Davies was succeeded by Steven Moffat as executive producer and head writer and Julie Gardner was replaced as executive producer by Piers Wenger, who had replaced Gardner as BBC Wales head of drama. Beth Willis was an executive producer, and the series was produced by Tracie Simpson and Peter Bennett. Murray Gold remained as composer.

The 2005 Doctor Who revival was marketed as series 1, although it had been broadcast on BBC Television for 26 years (from 1963 to 1989). When the series was confirmed by the BBC in September 2007, it was called "series 5" and followed 2008's series 4. In August 2009, Doctor Who Magazine reported that the series would be produced and marketed as "Series One". The January 2010 issue contained an interview with Moffat in which he called Series One "exciting", Series Thirty-One "awe-inspiring", and Series Five "boring and a lie". He jokingly referred to the season as "series Fnarg", which became a running joke in later issues of the magazine. The March issue, which called it Series Thirty-One, listed production code numbers from 1.1 to 1.13. However, BBC Programme listings, the BBC iPlayer and DVDs refer to it as "Series 5".

=== Writing ===
Despite changes to the show, Moffat wanted to reassure the audience that "nothing has really been lost"; it was the same show, and the Doctor was the same character. The story arc of cracks in the universe was inspired by a crack in the wall of Moffat's son's bedroom. Moffat wanted to ensure that the show appealed to young children; if they could not follow the plot, there would be "big pictures" to entertain them. He believed that although Doctor Who is fundamentally a children's show, it has a universal appeal comparable to Star Wars and Toy Story. Moffat considered a children's story the "most popular form of entertainment". About the series, he said that they "pushed the fairytale side of it"; Doctor Who "now has to be the most fantastical of the fantasy shows" to be more vibrant and "bonkers" than any other fantasy show.

In a 2013 interview, Moffat said that he had worked out a rough idea for how his first series as showrunner would work if David Tennant had decided to remain as the Tenth Doctor. Its premise would have been similar to the beginning of "The Eleventh Hour" as broadcast:

Had David stayed for one final year, it would certainly have been his last, so my pitch was that it would start with the Tardis crashing in Amelia's back garden – as now – and a terribly battered and bruised Tenth Doctor staggering out. Amelia finds him, feeds him fish custard (no that was for Matt, it would have been something more Davidy) and generally helps him. But we, the audience, can see he's in a truly bad way. Dying maybe. Eventually he heads back to his TARDIS, and flies off. But when he returns – many years later for Amy – he seems perfectly fine, and indeed doesn't remember any of those events…And of course over time, we realise what we saw was the Tenth Doctor at the end of his life, about to regenerate. Events that we return to in Episode 13 ...

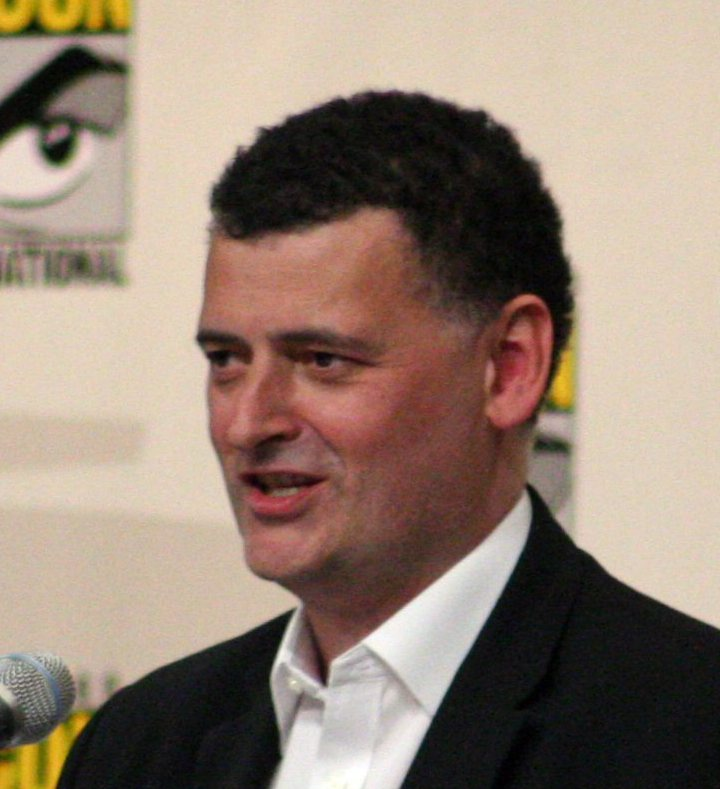
Showrunner Steven Moffat wrote six episodes for the series.

Moffat wrote six episodes for the series; the rest were written by others, since he believed that Doctor Who benefited from different voices. According to Moffat, he primarily supplied the other episode concepts and had a "pretty good idea" of what would happen in each episode. He knew the guest writers "to some degree", and called his meetings with them "quite joyous". Matthew Graham, co-creator of Life on Mars and writer of the second series episode "Fear Her", did not write his planned episode because he did not believe he would have enough time. Moffat later contacted him and asked him to write a two-part episode for the next series ("The Rebel Flesh" and "The Almost People").

In the first episode, Moffat intended to introduce the Eleventh Doctor and establish his new identity; the second was intended to demonstrate the Doctor's need for a companion and Amy's importance to him. For the third episode, he asked Mark Gatiss to write an episode about "Churchill versus the Daleks". Moffat wanted to incorporate the popular Daleks into the new series, and considered redesigning them. Gatiss, Moffat and the production team worked together to create large, more-colourful Daleks, similar to those in the 1960s films.

For the fourth and fifth episodes, Moffat planned a two-part sequel to his 2007 "Blink" with the Weeping Angels. The episodes, "The Time of Angels" and "Flesh and Stone", were intended to be more action-oriented than "Blink" and demonstrate that the Angels had a plan other than scavenging. He decided to flesh out the Angels as villains and show more of what they could do. "Flesh and Stone" ends with Amy attempting to seduce the Doctor, which Moffat believed was consistent with her character development.

Toby Whithouse originally planned to write a different episode, but Moffat and Wenger considered it too similar to other episodes in the series. Whithouse wrote "The Vampires of Venice" instead, and his original episode was moved back to the next series. He was asked to write "a big bold romantic episode" which would be a "good jumping off point" for new viewers of Doctor Who. Moffat thought that in the middle of the series, a viewer could "start watching it again" and it should be "something romantic and funny". For the next episode, Moffat asked comedy writer Simon Nye to write a story which challenged the relationship between Amy and the Doctor. The episode, "Amy's Choice", was intended to have the character choose between excitement with the Doctor or life with Rory. The scene in which Rory dies in the false reality was intended to reveal Amy's feelings for him. Nye wanted to stress that Amy really loved Rory, and he was not "just a cypher boyfriend or fiancé".

Moffat contacted Chris Chibnall to write a two-part episode involving the Silurians, villains who had not appeared on the show for over 25 years. Since the Silurians were not as well known as other monsters, he instructed Chibnall to reintroduce them. These Silurians were intended to be a different branch than the original ones; their design was different, with facial prosthetics and no third eye. Richard Curtis, who had worked with Moffat on the 1999 Comic Relief special Doctor Who and the Curse of Fatal Death, was contacted by Moffat to return the favour and write an episode ("Vincent and the Doctor"). Curtis had an idea for an episode about van Gogh for "a long while", and was intrigued that van Gogh never knew he was famous. Gillan noted that there was a different approach and style to the episode, and it was more character-driven.

Although Neil Gaiman had written "The Doctor's Wife", it was moved to the next series due to budgetary constraints and replaced with "The Lodger". "The Lodger" was adapted from a comic strip of the same name by Gareth Roberts for Doctor Who Magazine, although he said that most of it was begun "from scratch". The story was inspired by the desire to see the Doctor in normal, every-day human circumstances and Roberts' enjoyment of stories set on Earth, rather than in space. Roberts was interested in doing a television version of the story, but had not mentioned it; Moffat enjoyed the comic story, and asked to adapt it into an episode when he became showrunner. Roberts had previously considered a storyline featuring a disgraced Sontaran named Strom before ultimately settling on the story that would become "The Lodger". In a 2021 interview, Robert Shearman revealed he had been involved in development for Series 5, but later departed. Moffat extended an open invitation to return, but Shearman declined, citing changes in his career and the higher profile of screenwriters attracted to the show. Shearman would later state in an interview that this story would have been based on the audio drama The Chimes of Midnight. Jack Thorne was also in contention to write an episode, but amicably parted ways.

Aspects of the finale occurred to Moffat as he planned the series' story arc, although he left room to improvise as the story developed. "The Big Bang" ends with Amy and Rory's wedding; Moffat said that he had intended for them to get married "from the off". The finale left questions (which would be answered in the next series) about River Song's identity and "the Silence", which apparently caused the TARDIS to explode.

=== Costumes ===
Although the Eleventh Doctor still wears his previous incarnation's costume in the first episode, costume designer Ray Holman said that the costume was broken-down and distressed. During the first episode, he would find his own identity and pick out his unique costume. Smith tried on a variety of things to find a look he would feel comfortable and confident in and which would identify his Doctor. He brought in braces and a tweed jacket; Holman thought the tweed jacket was "a bit old for him", but it indicated that he was a "professor and student at the same time" and gave him "that quality that the Doctor's still learning, but also has some authority". Smith suggested a bow tie; Holman and others did not approve, but when he put it on they decided that they had his costume. According to the actor, he was influenced by the Second Doctor's costume in The Tomb of the Cybermen. Other inspirations were the "element of a professor" and "big, dusty boots like Indiana Jones". The men's clothing store Topman reported that their bow-tie sales increased by 94 per cent in April 2010, when the series began airing.

Gillan had substantial input into Amy's costume, hairstyle and make-up. Holman said that Amy's identity was unclear in the first episode, but she later wore her own clothes. According to the actress, Amy had the inner confidence to wear clothes which showed "a bit of skin from time to time". Although she tried on a number of costumes, when it came to short skirts she "just thought it was right" and indicated that Amy was "comfortable and confident about her look". Gillan believed that the skirts reflected what young women typically wear at her age. Executive producer Piers Wenger noted that Amy's 1970s flying jacket (which she wore "quite a lot") reflected Gillan as a "born adventurer", and Amy developed a love of travel and adventure.

=== Design changes ===
The redesigned Doctor Who title card for series 5, with its new logo (the first major change since the series' revival)

The series introduced a new logo, which was announced in October 2009. According to the BBC, it was the eleventh version of the show's logo. According to Moffat, the "DW" insignia in the shape of the TARDIS was "something really new". The logo was incorporated in a new title sequence, which was not revealed to an audience outside the BBC until the first transmission of "The Eleventh Hour"; previous press screenings and previews had used a variant of the previous sequence. Moffat wanted a new version of the theme music, and composer Murray Gold wanted it to "sound a bit reckless". The new version, composed by Gold, incorporated an electronic-trumpet melody and a faster tempo. Some fans disliked the new theme, and the BBC had received 70 complaints by 18 April 2010. A Doctor Who spokesman responded, "The arranger has made alterations to the music four times since 2005, so change is nothing new. It is important for the regeneration of the show to keep revisiting the score while always retaining the haunting and ground-breaking essence of the original".

A new TARDIS prop was used, with the St John Ambulance logo which had been used in the early days of the show and the mid-1960s Peter Cushing films (of which Moffat was a fan). Moffat said that it was something he "really wanted to do", was for "no other reason than that [he] thought it was prettier", and he wanted the St John Ambulance sticker on the front. It is a brighter shade of blue, like Cushing's TARDIS.

A new set of the TARDIS interior was designed, which Moffat estimated was three times larger than the previous set. Although he did not decide to create the new interior specifically for the new Doctor, the set designer was briefed to create a design which would suit Smith's Doctor. Moffat liked the old set, but thought it was time for a new one to "surprise people" and believed that the spirit of a new era was to change everything. Piers Wenger said that it took "quite a long time to get the design right", and they were careful not to make it too futuristic-looking since "futuristic" meant nothing to the Doctor. The set was designed by Edward Thomas. The previous TARDIS interior was shown at the beginning of "The Eleventh Hour"; the Time Rotor on the console had to be rebuilt, due to the explosive special effects used in "The End of Time". The sonic screwdriver is destroyed in "The Eleventh Hour" and a new version, with a green light and metal claws, was created. Smith liked to keep the prop with him, "twirling it around and flicking it", and broke four of them. The noise made by the screwdriver was added in post-production with a synthesiser. Moffat described the changes as starting with a "clean slate", which made sense after the previous cast and crew had left.

=== Music ===
Murray Gold composed the soundtrack to this series, with orchestration by Ben Foster.

=== Filming ===
All the series' directors were new to Doctor Who; Moffat said that he wanted to "shake things up", and it was "never too early to get rid of the safety net." Adam Smith directed the first, fourth and fifth episodes, and Andrew Gunn, Ashley Way, Jonny Campbell, Toby Haynes and Catherine Morshead directed two episodes apiece.

Filming of "The Eleventh Hour", with Matt Smith and Karen Gillan

Rehearsing episodes four and five (the first episodes produced), director Adam Smith suggested that Smith and Gillan "have an adventure" in which they could experience something exciting, laugh and scream; he took them on a "real white knuckle ride" on a boat in Cardiff Bay. Filming began on 20 July 2009 on the Southerndown beach in the Vale of Glamorgan for "The Time of Angels" and "Flesh and Stone". Moffat wrote that in a typical television production the first day of filming "will probably be something fairly inconsequential and involve a minor character getting shot, or a close up of a hand or something", rather than the "iconic" scene with the Doctor, Amy, River Song and the TARDIS. Forest scenes in "Flesh and Stone" were filmed at Puzzlewood in the Forest of Dean over nine nights in July 2009.

Episodes two and three made up the second production block. Scenes for "The Beast Below" were filmed in an orangery at Margam Country Park in Port Talbot during a night shoot on 22 September 2009. Half a scene for "The Pandorica Opens", with Liz 10 (Sophie Okonedo) from "The Beast Below", was also filmed there. Scenes for Amy and Rory's town of Leadworth in the first episode, "The Eleventh Hour", were filmed in the village of Llandaff in Cardiff over a number of days in the autumn of 2009: 29 September, 5–7 October, and 20 November.

The fourth production block, consisting of "The Hungry Earth" and "Cold Blood", was filmed in October and November 2009; location filming was done in Llanwynno, Wales. Scenes for "Cold Blood" were also filmed at the Plantasia botanical garden in Swansea on 13 November 2009, and in Cardiff's Temple of Peace and other locations and unusual sets for the Silurian city. "The Vampires of Venice" and "Vincent and the Doctor" were filmed primarily in Trogir, Croatia, which stood in for Venice and Paris respectively. Although a small crew went to Venice for wide shots of coastal buildings, the episode was not filmed there because it would take too long to cover up the modern shops in the present-day city. Scenes for "The Vampires of Venice" were also filmed at Atlantic College, Caerphilly Castle, Castell Coch, Trogir's town hall, and Llancaich Fawr Manor.

The grounds of the Margam Country Park estate were used for the placement of "Foamhenge", a lightweight replica of Stonehenge for "The Pandorica Opens". Several other scenes for "The Pandorica Opens" and "The Big Bang" were also filmed there during the first few days of February 2010. The Pandorica chamber was filmed in Upper Boat Studios, on the largest set ever built there. Additional scenes for "The Big Bang" were filmed in Brangwyn Hall and Miskin Manor. "Amy's Choice" was partially filmed in Skenfrith, Wales, as Upper Leadworth.

Filming of the series lasted about nine months. Production blocks were arranged as follows:

Block	Episode(s)	Director	Writer(s)	Producer(s)	Code
1	Episode 4: "The Time of Angels"	Adam Smith	Steven Moffat	Tracie Simpson	1.4
1	Episode 5: "Flesh and Stone"	Adam Smith	Steven Moffat	Tracie Simpson	1.5
2	Episode 3: "Victory of the Daleks"	Andrew Gunn	Mark Gatiss	Peter Bennett	1.3
2	Episode 2: "The Beast Below"	Andrew Gunn	Steven Moffat	Peter Bennett	1.2
3	Episode 1: "The Eleventh Hour"	Adam Smith	Steven Moffat	Tracie Simpson	1.1
4	Episode 8: "The Hungry Earth"	Ashley Way	Chris Chibnall	Peter Bennett	1.8
4	Episode 9: "Cold Blood"	Ashley Way	Chris Chibnall	Peter Bennett	1.9
5	Episode 6: "The Vampires of Venice"	Jonny Campbell	Toby Whithouse	Tracie Simpson & Patrick Schweitzer	1.6
5	Episode 10: "Vincent and the Doctor"	Jonny Campbell	Richard Curtis	Tracie Simpson & Patrick Schweitzer	1.10
6	Episode 12: "The Pandorica Opens"	Toby Haynes	Steven Moffat	Peter Bennett	1.12
6	Episode 13: "The Big Bang"	Toby Haynes	Steven Moffat	Peter Bennett	1.13
7	Episode 11: "The Lodger"	Catherine Morshead	Gareth Roberts	Tracie Simpson	1.11
7	Episode 7: "Amy's Choice"	Catherine Morshead	Simon Nye	Tracie Simpson	1.7

== Release ==
=== Promotion ===
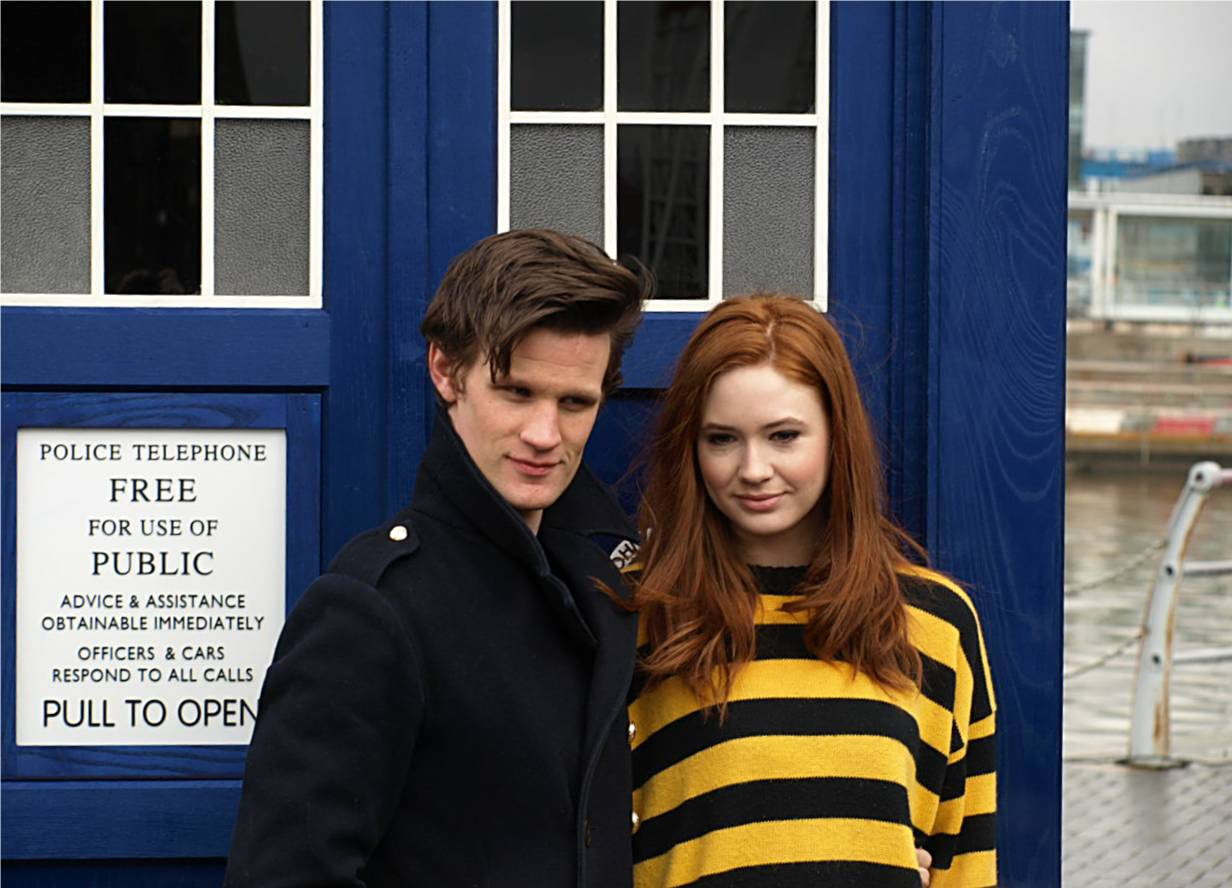
Smith and Gillan promoting the series in Salford

The first trailer of the series was shown on television and released online shortly after the broadcast of the second part of "The End of Time" on 1 January 2010. On 17 February, a new promotional image was released. A second trailer was released on 20 February, and a 3D version was shown in cinemas with Alice in Wonderland. Moffat confirmed the series' 3 April start date on the 19 March BBC Breakfast. That day, a trailer shown at the press screening of episode one was released online. BBC America, which would air the series in the United States, released an extended trailer on 21 March. Promotional touring for the series began on 29 March and ended two days later, with Smith and Gillan presenting the first episode in Belfast, Inverness, Sunderland, Salford and Northampton. The first episode was screened in New York's Paley Center for Media and the Village East Movie Theatre on 14 April.

=== Domestic broadcast ===
The fifth series of Doctor Who debuted on BBC One on 3 April 2010 with "The Eleventh Hour", an extended 65-minute episode. It concluded with "The Big Bang" on 26 June. The sixth episode ("The Vampires of Venice") was broadcast at 6:00 p.m. BST, the earliest start time for an episode of Doctor Who since its 2005 return.

=== International broadcast ===
The series was shown in Australia on the ABC's iview service, launching at midnight on 16 April 2010 before airing on ABC1 two days later. It began airing in the United States on 17 April 2010 on BBC America and in Canada that day on Space. This was the first initial airing of a full series of Doctor Who on BBC America; the first four series premiered on the Sci-Fi Channel, rerunning on BBC America. The gap between the UK and US airings lessened considerably. In New Zealand, the series began airing on Prime on 2 May 2010.

=== Home media ===
On 7 June 2010, the first volume of Series 5 was released on DVD and Blu-ray in Region 2 with "The Eleventh Hour", "The Beast Below" and "Victory of the Daleks". The second volume was released on 5 July on DVD and Blu-ray, with "The Time of Angels", "Flesh and Stone" and "The Vampires of Venice". "Amy's Choice", "The Hungry Earth", and "Cold Blood" followed in the third volume, which was released on DVD and Blu-ray on 2 August 2010. The fourth and final volume, with "Vincent and the Doctor", "The Lodger", "The Pandorica Opens" and "The Big Bang", was released on DVD and Blu-ray on 6 September.

A collection of the series' episodes was released on DVD and Blu-ray in Region 2 on 8 November 2010 and in Region 1 the following day. In Region 4, the box set was released on 2 December 2010. It contained the two "Meanwhile, in the TARDIS" additional scenes, profiles of enemies in "The Monster Files", abridged versions of Doctor Who Confidential, out-takes, in-vision commentaries, video diaries, and trailers and promos for the series. The commentaries were a departure from previous releases, with six instead of a full thirteen.

- ^{(D)} indicates a DVD release for a specific date
- ^{(B)} indicates a Blu-ray release
- ^{(D,B)} indicates a simultaneous DVD and Blu-ray release

Series	Story no.	Episode name	Duration	Release date		
Series	Story no.	Episode name	Duration	R2	R4	R1
5	203–205	Doctor Who: Series 5, Volume 1 "The Eleventh Hour" – "Victory of the Daleks"	1 × 65 min. 2 × 45 min.	7 June 2010^{(D,B)}	1 July 2010^{(D,B)}	—N/a
5	206–207	Doctor Who: Series 5, Volume 2 "The Time of Angels" – "The Vampires of Venice"	2 × 45 min. 1 × 50 min.	5 July 2010^{(D,B)}	5 August 2010^{(D,B)}	—N/a
5	208–209	Doctor Who: Series 5, Volume 3 "Amy's Choice" – "Cold Blood"	3 × 45 min.	2 August 2010^{(D,B)}	2 September 2010^{(D,B)}	—N/a
5	210–212	Doctor Who: Series 5, Volume 4 "Vincent and the Doctor" – "The Big Bang"	2 × 45 min. 1 × 50 min. 1 × 55 min.	6 September 2010^{(D,B)}	7 October 2010^{(D,B)}	—N/a
5	203–212	Doctor Who: The Complete Fifth Series	8 × 45 min. 3 × 50 min. 1 × 55 min. 1 × 65 min.	8 November 2010^{(D,B)}	2 December 2010^{(D,B)}	9 November 2010^{(D,B)}
5	203–207	Doctor Who: Series 5, Part 1 "The Eleventh Hour" – "The Vampires of Venice"	1 × 65 min. 4 × 45 min. 1 × 50 min.	—N/a	—N/a	15 March 2016
5	208–212	Doctor Who: Series 5, Part 2 "Amy's Choice" – "The Big Bang"	1 × 55 min. 5 × 45 min. 1 × 50 min.	—N/a	—N/a	26 July 2016
5, 6, 7, 2013 specials	203–241	Doctor Who: The Complete Matt Smith Years	30 × 45 min. 7 × 50 min. 1 × 55 min. 4 × 60 min. 1 × 65 min. 1 × 77 min.	—N/a	—N/a	4 November 2014^{(B)} 2 October 2018^{(D)}

=== Books ===
==== Novelisations ====
Series	Story no.	Novelisation title	Author	Original publisher	Paperback release date	Audiobook	
Series	Story no.	Novelisation title	Author	Original publisher	Paperback release date	Release date (Note: Unabridged from BBC Audio / AudioGo unless otherwise indicated)	Narrator
5	203	The Eleventh Hour	Trevor Baxendale	Pearson Education	5 May 2011	—N/a	
5	205	Victory of the Daleks (Note: Photo novelisation)	Peter Gutiérrez	Pearson Education	5 May 2011	—N/a	
5	206	The Time of Angels (Note: Also adapts "Flesh and Stone")	Trevor Baxendale	Pearson Education	5 May 2011	—N/a	
5	206	The Time of Angels	Jenny T. Colgan	BBC Books (Target collection)	26 March 2026		Maureen O'Brien
5	211	The Lodger	Peter Gutiérrez	Pearson Education	5 May 2011	—N/a	

==== Novels ====
In the BBC Books Doctor Who New Series Adventures line (a series of spin-off novels which began in 2005 with the Ninth Doctor and the revival of the television series), six novels were published corresponding to the series. On 22 April 2010, the first three (Apollo 23 by Justin Richards, Night of the Humans by David Llewellyn, and The Forgotten Army by Brian Minchin) were published with the Eleventh Doctor and Amy. On 8 July 2010, three more novels were published: Nuclear Time by Oli Smith, The Glamour Chase by Gary Russell and The King's Dragon by Una McCormack, with the Doctor, Amy and Rory.

Science-fiction writer Michael Moorcock, who had watched Doctor Who since the beginning, also wrote a novel. The 345-page The Coming of the Terraphiles was published on 14 October 2010. On 16 September 2010, BBC Books published their first Doctor Who graphic novel: The Only Good Dalek, with the Doctor and Amy. BBC Books also published The Brilliant Book of Doctor Who 2011, a guide to the series with behind-the-scenes content, in the UK on 30 September 2010.

=== Soundtrack ===
A two-disc soundtrack with 63 tracks of the score from this series (from "The Eleventh Hour" to "The Big Bang"), composed by Murray Gold, was released on 8 November 2010 on Silva Screen Records. It was the second double album after the previous release; Gold said that the previous double album was popular, and Silva Screen allowed another one. The tracks are presented in episode order, which Gold said "should give a sense of roaming through this gigantic scope".

Doctor Who: Series 5

Soundtrack album by Murray Gold, Ben Foster and the BBC National Orchestra of Wales
- Released: November 8, 2010
- Recorded: 2009–2010
- Genre: Soundtrack
- Length: 131:47; 139:59 (iTunes Version)
- Label: Silva Screen Records
- Producer: Murray Gold

Doctor Who soundtrack chronology
Series 4 – The Specials (2010)	Series 5 (2010)	A Christmas Carol (2011)

Disc 1
No.	Title	Episode	Length
1.	"Doctor Who XI"	All	1:04
2.	"Down to Earth"	"The Eleventh Hour"	1:06
3.	"Little Amy"	"The Eleventh Hour"	1:45
4.	"Fish Custard"	"The Eleventh Hour"	2:00
5.	"Can I Come with You?"	"The Eleventh Hour"	1:38
6.	"Little Amy: The Apple"	"The Eleventh Hour"	1:12
7.	"The Sun's Gone Wibbly"	"The Eleventh Hour"	2:25
8.	"Zero"	"The Eleventh Hour"	1:42
9.	"I Am the Doctor"	"The Eleventh Hour"	4:04
10.	"The Mad Man with a Box"	"The Eleventh Hour"	2:11
11.	"Amy in the TARDIS"	"The Eleventh Hour"	4:18
12.	"The Beast Below"	"The Beast Below"	1:50
13.	"Amy's Theme"	"The Beast Below"	2:06
14.	"A Lonely Decision"	"The Beast Below"	3:24
15.	"A Tyrannical Menace"	"Victory of the Daleks"	2:03
16.	"Victory of the Daleks"	"Victory of the Daleks"	1:13
17.	"Battle in the Sky"	"Victory of the Daleks"	3:25
18.	"River's Path"	"The Time of Angels" / "Flesh and Stone"	1:16
19.	"The Time of Angels"	"The Time of Angels" / "Flesh and Stone"	3:59
20.	"I Offer You My Daughter"	"The Vampires of Venice"	1:38
21.	"Chicken Casanova"	"The Vampires of Venice"	1:24
22.	"Signora Rosanna Calvierri"	"The Vampires of Venice"	4:25
23.	"Cab for Amy Pond"	"The Vampires of Venice"	2:08
24.	"The Vampires of Venice"	"The Vampires of Venice"	4:50
25.	"Wedded Bliss"	"Amy's Choice"	1:07
26.	"This Is the Dream"	"Amy's Choice"	2:55
27.	"Rio de Cwmtaff"	"The Hungry Earth" / "Cold Blood"	4:03
28.	"The Silurians"	"The Hungry Earth" / "Cold Blood"	2:02
Total length:			67:13

Disc 2
No.	Title	Episode	Length
1.	"Paint"	"Vincent and the Doctor"	0:35
2.	"Vincent"	"Vincent and the Doctor"	2:00
3.	"Hidden Treasures"	"Vincent and the Doctor"	1:01
4.	"A Troubled Man"	"Vincent and the Doctor"	2:30
5.	"With Love, Vincent"	"Vincent and the Doctor"	3:27
6.	"Adrift in the TARDIS"	"The Lodger"	0:45
7.	"Friends and Neighbours"	"The Lodger"	1:16
8.	"Doctor Gastronomy"	"The Lodger"	1:08
9.	"You Must Like It Here"	"The Lodger"	0:52
10.	"A Useful Striker"	"The Lodger"	1:33
11.	"A Painful Exchange"	"The Lodger"	1:11
12.	"Kiss the Girl"	"The Lodger"	5:14
13.	"Thank You Craig"	"The Lodger"	0:45
14.	"River Runs Through It"	"The Pandorica Opens" / "The Big Bang"	1:28
15.	"Away on Horseback"	"The Pandorica Opens" / "The Big Bang"	1:25
16.	"Beneath Stonehenge"	"The Pandorica Opens" / "The Big Bang"	3:45
17.	"Who Else Is Coming"	"The Pandorica Opens" / "The Big Bang"	1:52
18.	"Amy and Rory"	"The Pandorica Opens" / "The Big Bang"	0:46
19.	"The Pandorica"	"The Pandorica Opens" / "The Big Bang"	2:00
20.	"Words Win Wars"	"The Pandorica Opens" / "The Big Bang"	1:48
21.	"The Life and Death of Amy Pond"	"The Pandorica Opens" / "The Big Bang"	3:12
22.	"Amy's Starless Life"	"The Pandorica Opens" / "The Big Bang"	1:41
23.	"Into the Museum"	"The Pandorica Opens" / "The Big Bang"	1:17
24.	"This Is Where It Gets Complicated"	"The Pandorica Opens" / "The Big Bang"	1:08
25.	"Roman Paradox"	"The Pandorica Opens" / "The Big Bang"	1:22
26.	"The Patient Centurion"	"The Pandorica Opens" / "The Big Bang"	2:49
27.	"The Same Sonic"	"The Pandorica Opens" / "The Big Bang"	0:54
28.	"Honey I'm Home"	"The Pandorica Opens" / "The Big Bang"	2:13
29.	"The Perfect Prison"	"The Pandorica Opens" / "The Big Bang"	2:41
30.	"A River of Tears"	"The Pandorica Opens" / "The Big Bang"	1:00
31.	"The Sad Man with a Box"	"The Pandorica Opens" / "The Big Bang"	3:18
32.	"You and Me, Amy"	"The Pandorica Opens" / "The Big Bang"	2:27
33.	"The Big Day"	"The Pandorica Opens" / "The Big Bang"	2:20
34.	"I Remember You"	"The Pandorica Opens" / "The Big Bang"	1:53
35.	"Onwards!"	"The Pandorica Opens" / "The Big Bang"	0:58
Total length:			64:34

iTunes Store exclusives
No.	Title	Episode	Length
36.	"Emotions Get the Better of Him"	"Victory of the Daleks"	4:36
37.	"Impossible Choice"	"The Beast Below"	3:36
Total length:			8:12

=== Video games ===
In March 2010, it was reported that Nintendo had signed a £10 million contract for Doctor Who games for Wii and DS. The games were marketed to Nintendo because the brand was known as family-oriented and the Wii, in particular, was something that families played together. The BBC was certain to monitor the games and make sure they did not contain excessive violence. Doctor Who: Evacuation Earth was released for the DS and featured the Daleks, and Doctor Who: Return to Earth featured the Cybermen and was released for the Wii. Both games featured the Eleventh Doctor and Amy Pond, voiced by Smith and Gillan. Evacuation Earth was released on 12 November 2010, with Return to Earth following on 19 November. Wii remotes and DS styluses modelled after the sonic screwdriver were released to accompany the games.

Children don't just watch Doctor Who – they join in. They make up games, invent their monsters, create their own stories. Now, there's something else – now they can be the Doctor in brand new episodes. Doctor Who: The Adventure Games will offer fans a unique opportunity to enter his world, face his challenges and grapple with his deadliest foes. By developing these games alongside the new TV series, we've been able to weave exciting narrative strands with the very finest game design to create a new kind of Doctor Who, which can be enjoyed by the whole family.

— Steven Moffat

In April 2010 the BBC announced The Adventure Games, four interactive episodes available free-to-download on the BBC Doctor Who website with the Doctor and Amy voiced by Smith and Gillan. Piers Wenger referred to them as four extra episodes in the series, with all content part of the Doctor Who universe. The games, developed by Charles Cecil and Sheffield-based game company Sumo, were written by Phil Ford and James Moran and overseen by Moffat and the show's producers. Cecil was contacted by BBC Wales interactive editor Iain Tweedale, who asked him about developing a Doctor Who game. Smith and Gillan's movements were captured by rotoscoping.

Since the Doctor is a pacifist and does not use the guns commonly found in video games, The Adventure Games utilised a more strategy- and puzzle-based gameplay; much of the first game was based on stealth, exploration, and puzzle-solving. The Doctor was equipped with his sonic screwdriver but, since it was often used as a skeleton key in the show, the game employs puzzle-solving to advance instead of simply using the screwdriver.

The first instalment, City of the Daleks, was originally scheduled for release on 5 June 2010, but was made available two days earlier. The BBC explained the early release as a testing procedure, and final tweaks were expected to be made before its official release. In its first twelve days of availability the game was downloaded over 500,000 times, and traffic on the website had increased. The second game, Blood of the Cybermen, was released on 26 June after the series finale aired. It was followed by the third game (TARDIS) on 27 August, and Shadows of the Vashta Nerada on 22 December.

A mobile game app was also developed by Tag Games for BBC Worldwide. Entitled "Doctor Who: The Mazes of Time", it allowed play as the Doctor and Amy and involved time travel, defeating enemies, and solving problems. The game had over 100 puzzles, seven locations to travel to, music from the show, and the Daleks, Cybermen and Silurians as enemies. The app was released for Apple IOS devices on 16 December 2010, and for Android on 17 August 2011.

== Reception ==
=== Ratings ===
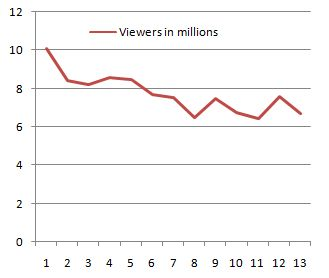
Final ratings for the fifth series

Final consolidated viewing figures showed that the premiere, "The Eleventh Hour", was seen by 10.085 million viewers—the most-watched premiere since "Rose", and the eighth-highest figure for an episode of Doctor Who since its 2005 revival. In the US, the first episode set a record for BBC America with an average of 1.2 million viewers and 0.9 million in the adult 25–54 demographic. Within a week of its broadcast, "The Eleventh Hour" received 1.27 million hits on BBC's online iPlayer service—a record for the most requests in a week. It was the most-requested episode of 2010 (with 2.2 million views), and Doctor Who was also the most-watched programme of the year on the service.

"The Hungry Earth" received the lowest overnight ratings since the series' 2005 return, with 4.4 million viewers; in final consolidated ratings, "The Lodger" was the series' low point. Its episodes received an Appreciation Index, a measure of how much the audience enjoyed the programme. The BBC considers a score 85 or above "excellent"; "Victory of the Daleks" and "Amy's Choice" were the only episodes to score less (84). "The Time of Angels" and "The Lodger" scored an 87, and "The Pandorica Opens" scored an 88. The finale ("The Big Bang") scored an 89, a series high and the highest of the BBC's four main channels on the day it was broadcast.

Based on overnight ratings, the series averaged six million viewers (a drop of 1.2 million from the previous series). BBC managers said that overall viewing numbers had not declined, since more people watched it online or recorded it. Stephen Bray of Den of Geek decided to "put things straight"; with final ratings taken into account of the first eleven episodes of the series (the last two ratings not released when the article was published), the series averaged 7.8 million viewers. This exceeded the average of the second series (7.5 million), the third series (7.7 million), and the first eleven episodes of the fourth series (7.7 million).

No.	Title	Air date	Overnight ratings		Consolidated ratings		Total viewers (millions)	AI	Ref(s)
No.	Title	Air date	Viewers (millions)	Rank	Viewers (millions)	Rank	Total viewers (millions)	AI	Ref(s)
1	"The Eleventh Hour"	3 April 2010	8.00	1	2.09	2	10.09	86	
2	"The Beast Below"	10 April 2010	6.70	1	1.72	5	8.42	86	
3	"Victory of the Daleks"	17 April 2010	6.20	2	2.01	4	8.21	84	
4	"The Time of Angels"	24 April 2010	6.80	2	1.79	5	8.59	87	
5	"Flesh and Stone"	1 May 2010	6.90	1	1.6	5	8.50	86	
6	"The Vampires of Venice"	8 May 2010	6.20	1	1.48	5	7.68	86	
7	"Amy's Choice"	15 May 2010	6.20	1	1.35	6	7.55	84	
8	"The Hungry Earth"	22 May 2010	4.50	5	1.99	9	6.49	86	
9	"Cold Blood"	29 May 2010	5.70	3	1.79	4	7.49	85	
10	"Vincent and the Doctor"	5 June 2010	5.00	2	1.76	2	6.76	86	
11	"The Lodger"	12 June 2010	4.60	4	1.84	6	6.44	87	
12	"The Pandorica Opens"	19 June 2010	5.90	1	1.67	5	7.57	88	
13	"The Big Bang"	26 June 2010	5.10	2	1.6	9	6.70	89	

=== Critical reception ===
And when Season 5 went big, it was electric. The likes of "The Eleventh Hour", the "Time of Angels/Flesh and Stone" two-parter, "Amy's Choice" and the series closing double-bill of "The Pandorica Opens" and "The Big Bang" delivered absolutely mesmerising TV gold. Bursting well out of its budgetary constraints, we got excitement, adventure, and enormous spectacle...That's not to say everything worked. Episodes like "Victory of the Daleks" (easily the least successful Who outing this year) stumbled with a limp plot that did little justice to the Daleks' rejuvenation. Indeed, the weaker episodes of the series seemed dogged by the kind of silly, slap-dash dips into strained logic that tainted the worst of [Davies]'s Doctor Who and episodes like "Vampires of Venice" and "The Lodger" simply couldn't bust out of previous seasons' bad habits. Even Moffat misfired with his own "The Beast Below" in a story that collapsed under the weight of its own ambitions.

— IGN's Matt Wales about the series

Series 5 received positive reviews from critics following its broadcast. The series garnered a 100% approval from 14 critics—an average rating of 9/10 on the review aggregation website Rotten Tomatoes, which said, "Doctor Who morphs once again into an enchanting odyssey in its fifth season, spearheaded by Matt Smith's endlessly endearing incarnation of the Time Lord." Matt Wales of IGN gave the series a "great" rating of 8.5 out of 10, saying that it "mightn't have been perfect" but rebooted the show "with a burst of creative energy" and "got bold, exciting, witty, smart, home-grown event television back on the small screen". He praised Smith for "[dazzling] with a performance that painted the Doctor as thoroughly alien" and the Doctor's "effortless" character development, but was critical of the Amy Pond character. Although he considered her "thoroughly watchable" (particularly her chemistry with Smith), he criticised the character as "frequently painted in largely two-dimensional strokes that made for a brash, sometimes irritating turn" and the series as a whole for lacking "heart to ground the elaborate sci-fi trimmings". Wales praised Moffat's "beautifully conceived" story arc and the narrative's complexities.

Zap2it's Sam McPherson gave the series an "A", considering it the show's strongest series since its 2005 revival. McPherson praised Smith and Gillan (noting that Amy did not have much character development), and thought that Darvill "might just be one of the best actors on television currently". Noting that most of the episodes were set on Earth or on spaceships, he wanted to see the Doctor, Amy and Rory "branch out more in the future". Dave Golder of SFX gave the series four out of five stars; it looked "very promising", although "there was a tentative, slightly awkward feel to the series" similar to the first series. He called Smith "magnificent" and Gillan "lovely, although so far Amy's character has been so dictated by the requirements of the arc plot that it's difficult to feel that we've really got to know her yet".

In a review of the first six episodes, Dan Martin of The Guardian thought that they were strong and "generally funnier [and] appears to have rewritten the rule that said Doctor Who had to out-epic itself every year". However, he criticised the lack of emotion which had previously inhibited the show and did not yet empathise with Amy. Martin noted that the series had a high expectation (due to the quality of Moffat's previous Doctor Who episodes) which may have disappointed those who expected "dark, adult versions of Who every week" as Moffat took more of a fairy-tale approach; his dialogue was "less soapy and more spiky" than Davies'. Revisiting previous issues, he noted that there was less emotion; however, "when someone did die ... it ploughed heavy into the heart". Amy was "a revelation", although she sometimes "felt a little one-note".

Gem Wheeler of Den of Geek gave the series five out of five stars, praising Smith's Doctor. Wheeler noted that Amy "seemed a little underwritten at first, but the series finale helped to fill in the apparent gaps in her personality"; Wheeler also praised Darvill. Slice of SciFi reviewer Michael Hickerson praised Moffat's "fascinating" story arc, which made the series more consistent; it gave the audience answers as it went along, and explored its impact on the characters. Hickerson called it "the best season of the new series", although "there has yet to be a perfect season of the show. This one just comes closer than a lot of others". Gavin Fuller of The Daily Telegraph, optimistic that it would "go from strength to strength next year", called the series "something of a curate's egg, and perhaps not quite as strong as previous years overall". Radio Times's Patrick Mulkern praised Moffat for "[rebooting] the series with an ambitious game-plan, a delightful fairy-tale vibe adults can enjoy too, and [finding] stars in Matt Smith, Karen Gillan and Arthur Darvill". Although he praised Moffat's other episodes, he considered "The Beast Below" a "turkey".

The A.V. Club ranked Doctor Who the 25th best show of 2010, saying that it "lacked a truly weak episode" and highlighting "The Time of Angels"/"Flesh and Stone", "Vincent and the Doctor", and "The Lodger" as its best episodes. Digital Spy ranked the programme the third-best of 2010, saying that it "gave us some terrific episodes — the beautifully tragic 'Vincent and the Doctor', the wonderfully-paced opener and the well-imagined finale ... but also the multi-colored monstrosity 'Victory of the Daleks'. Overall, a decent enough start for the new team, but with such a strong pedigree, we couldn't help but feel a little underwhelmed."

=== Criticism ===
After the broadcast of "The Eleventh Hour" (which introduced Amy as a kissogram, in a skimpy policewoman outfit, who watched the Doctor change into his new costume), it was reported that several viewers criticised the character and her occupation online as "not fitting for a family show". Wenger defended the character: "The whole kissogram thing played into Steven's desire for the companion to be feisty and outspoken and a bit of a number. Amy is probably the wildest companion that the Doctor has travelled with, but she isn't promiscuous." Gillan defended her character, saying that girls Amy's age often wore short skirts; Amy was a "strong female" and a "normal girl with normal impulses".

=== Awards and nominations ===
Year	Award	Category	Nominee(s)	Result	Ref(s)
2010	Constellation Awards	Best Male Performance in a 2010 Science Fiction Television Episode	Matt Smith	Nominated	
2010	Constellation Awards	Best Male Performance in a 2010 Science Fiction Television Episode	Tony Curran	Nominated	
2010	Constellation Awards	Best Female Performance	Karen Gillan (for "Amy's Choice")	Nominated	
2010	Constellation Awards	Science Fiction Television Series	Doctor Who	Nominated	
2010	Constellation Awards	Best Overall 2010 Science Fiction Film or Television Script	Steven Moffat (for "The Eleventh Hour")	Nominated	
2010	Constellation Awards	Best Overall 2010 Science Fiction Film or Television Script	Richard Curtis (for "Vincent and the Doctor")	Nominated	
2010	Constellation Awards	Best Technical Accomplishment in a 2010 Science Fiction Film or Television Production	Murray Gold	Won	
2010	Nebula Awards	Bradbury Award for Outstanding Dramatic Presentation	"Vincent and the Doctor"	Nominated	
2010	Royal Television Society	Craft and Design Award	The Mill	Won	
2011	BAFTA Cymru	Lighting	Mark Hutchinson (for "The Eleventh Hour")	Won	
2011	BAFTA Cymru	Make Up & Hair	Barbara Southcott (for "Vampires of Venice")	Nominated	
2011	BAFTA Cymru	Editing: Fiction	William Oswald (for "The Time of Angels")	Nominated	
2011	British Academy of Film and Television Arts	Leading Actor	Matt Smith	Nominated	
2011	Hugo Awards	Hugo Award for Best Dramatic Presentation (Short Form)	"Vincent and the Doctor"	Nominated	
2011	Hugo Awards	Hugo Award for Best Dramatic Presentation (Short Form)	"The Pandorica Opens" / "The Big Bang"	Won	
