= The Vampires of Venice =

Episode of Doctor Who

207 – "The Vampires of Venice"
- Doctor Who episode

Cast
- Doctor: Matt Smith – Eleventh Doctor
- Companions: Karen Gillan – Amy Pond; Arthur Darvill – Rory Williams
- Others: Helen McCrory – Rosanna Calvierri; Lucian Msamati – Guido; Alisha Bailey – Isabella; Alex Price – Francesco; Gabriella Wilde, Hannah Steele, Elizabeth Croft, Sonila Vieshta, Gabriella Montaraz – Vampire Girls; Michael Percival – Inspector; Simon Gregor – Steward

Production
- Directed by: Jonny Campbell
- Written by: Toby Whithouse
- Produced by: Tracie Simpson; Patrick Schweitzer
- Executive producers: Steven Moffat; Piers Wenger; Beth Willis
- Music by: Murray Gold
- Production code: 1.6
- Series: Series 5
- Running time: 50 minutes
- First broadcast: 8 May 2010

Chronology
← Preceded by "Flesh and Stone"	Followed by → "Amy's Choice"

"The Vampires of Venice" is the sixth episode of the fifth series of the British science fiction television series Doctor Who, which was broadcast on 8 May 2010 on BBC One. It was written by Toby Whithouse, who previously wrote "School Reunion", and was directed by first-time Doctor Who director Jonny Campbell.

Following from the end of "Flesh and Stone" where his companion Amy Pond (Karen Gillan) had kissed him, the alien time traveller the Eleventh Doctor (Matt Smith) picks up Amy's fiancé Rory (Arthur Darvill) and takes the two on a romantic trip to Venice in 1580. There they are intrigued by a girls' school whose students appear to be vampires and discover that they are really alien refugees in disguise, who plot to make Venice their new home.

The episode replaced a different script Whithouse had planned to write, and was designed to be a romantic episode that could also be a good introduction to the show. Whithouse chose the setting to be Venice, and vampires soon entered the plot as he felt they belonged in the setting. The episode was filmed in Trogir, Croatia in late 2009, with the old-fashioned village portraying Venice. The episode was seen by 7.68 million viewers in the UK and received an Appreciation Index of 86. The episode received mixed reviews from critics, who praised the comedy, production design, and acting of guests Helen McCrory and Alex Price, but thought that the plot elements were somewhat similar to a couple of other recent episodes.

== Plot ==
=== Synopsis ===
The Eleventh Doctor, believing Amy's newly found attraction to him is due to the stress from travel, invites Amy and her fiancé Rory on a romantic trip to Venice in 1580. The city's patron, Signora Rosanna Calvierri, has sealed off Venice, using the excuse of the Black Plague running rampant outside the city.

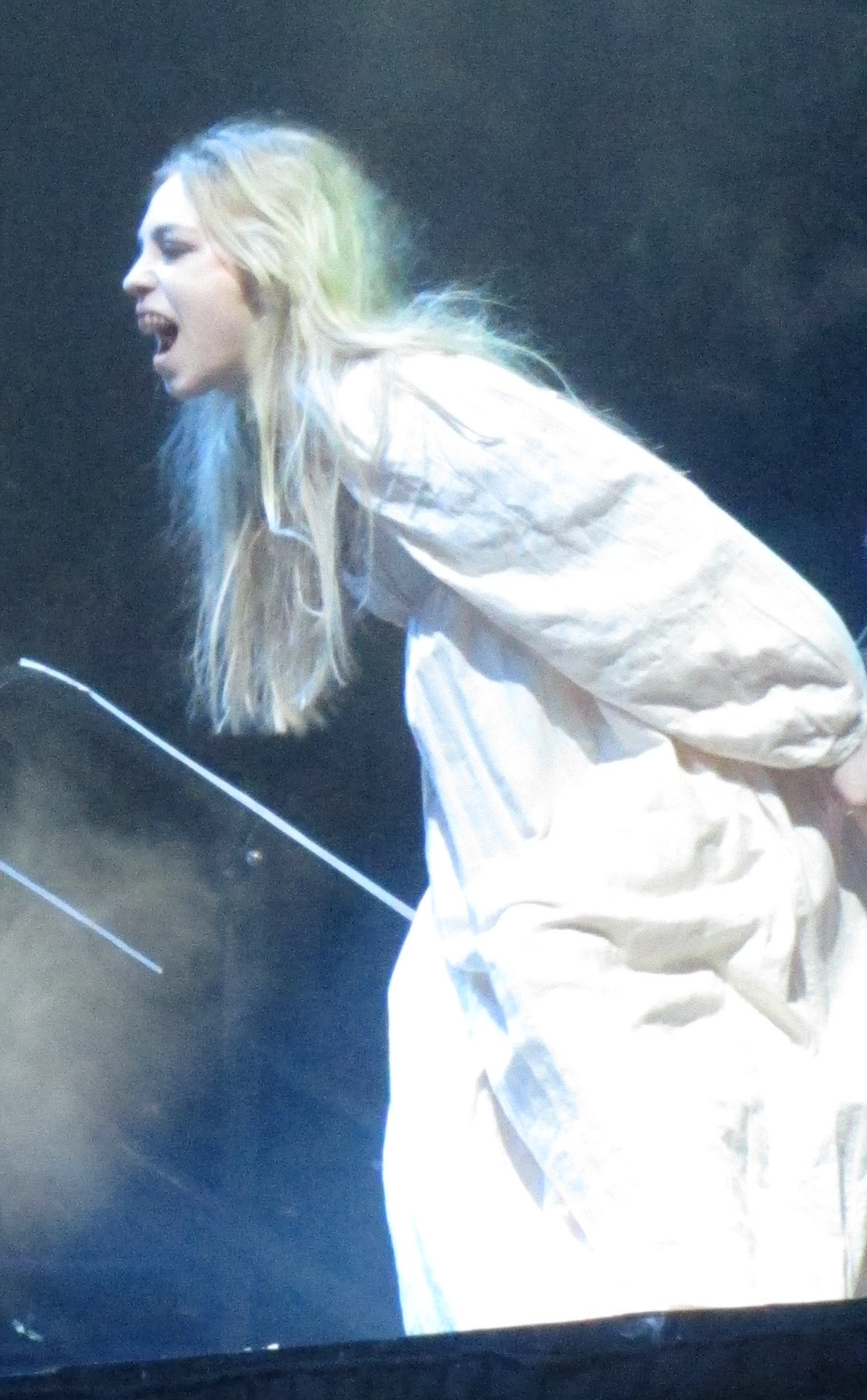
One of the Vampire girls, shown here at the Doctor Who Symphonic Spectacular

Rosanna, a fish-like alien refugee known as a Sister of the Water who "ran from the Silence", is transforming the students at her school for girls into more of her race. The Sisters have vampiric traits such as sharp teeth and an aversion to light, and use perception filters that make them not show up in reflections while appearing human. As Rosanna is the only female that has survived the trip, she converts girls in Venice into Sisters of the Water to allow the race to procreate. Amy devises a plan to place herself inside the school and unlock a way in for the Doctor and Rory to save Isabella, the daughter of the boat builder Guido. The Sisters begin converting Amy into one of them when Isabella, who has yet to be fully converted, frees Amy. Isabella is later thrown in the canal by Rosanna and eaten by Rosanna's male offspring.

When the Doctor regroups with Amy and Rory at Guido's home, Rosanna sends her transformed girls to attack them. Guido blows up several kegs of gunpowder, killing himself and the Sisters. Rosanna activates a device on a tower that begins to create the earthquakes and floods that will sink Venice and make it habitable for the new race. The Doctor climbs the tower and stops the device in time. The last female of her kind, Rosanna throws herself into the canal to be eaten by the male offspring.

Afterwards, Amy and the Doctor invite Rory to continue travelling with them, but as the Doctor and Rory are about to enter the TARDIS, everything falls silent.

=== Continuity ===
Intending to produce his psychic paper during the episode, the Eleventh Doctor accidentally produces a library card with a photograph of the First Doctor (William Hartnell).

== Production ==
=== Writing ===
"Actually, it was one of the most straightforward script processes I have ever had. That said, I can't remember who was the first person to mention vampires – I think, to be honest, it was probably me – but it was also the fact that Venice is a very dark, macabre place, full of shadows and secrets. There's something very clandestine about the city. And something very elegant and very Gothic. And so the idea of at least kicking the episode off with vampires seemed very fitting."

— Toby Whithouse

Writer Toby Whithouse originally planned to write a different episode set in "some sort of labyrinth", but after the idea had been developed for a while executive producers Steven Moffat and Piers Wenger thought that it was too similar to other episodes in the series, and asked him to write something else, while Whithouse's original idea was pushed to the next series (The God Complex). He was asked to write "a big bold romantic episode" which would also serve as a "sort of reboot episode" and a good introduction to Doctor Who. Whithouse was asked to set it "anywhere in the world" that was romantic, and he chose Venice, which he called "one of my favourite places in the world". Whithouse believed that the vampires fit into the setting. Whithouse had a positive experience writing the episode, reflecting that "writing on the show is a delight and a pleasure". As he was, at the time, executive producer of Being Human, he was pleased he only had to write the episode and not worry about the other aspects of production. The major plot point of "sinking Venice" was conceived as Whithouse needed to use the identity of the location and it was a very aquatic city, and Venice was "constantly fighting" enemies in its history but this time it proved to be its own worst enemy.

The opening scene, which detailed Isabella's entrance to the school and the foreboding danger that came with it, was described as "classic" Doctor Who by Whithouse as it contained a "victim coming into a trap". Isabella's scream at the end of the scene originally went into the title sequence; however, director Jonny Campbell thought that the next two scenes had "soft endings" that would not work well right after each other. As a result, the title sequence was moved to after the scene of the Doctor crashing Rory's stag party, which Whithouse described as a "fun scene" and a unique opening to the titles. Whithouse also wanted to emphasise the amount of danger the Doctor puts people in, which is pointed out by Rory in the episode. He believed that the companions over time developed the same mentality as the Doctor in running towards the danger, and so Rory was a great opportunity to question that. Whithouse also wanted a "comic thread" to "dilute" the plot and character developments. He also noted that it was difficult to capture Guido's "tragic" character in the running time. The episode also gives a "metatexual" reference by showing a picture of the Doctor's first incarnation on his library card. The references to "silence" in the episode are shown as flashbacks in the episode "Day of the Moon" of the next series, suggesting it was foreshadowing to the enemy of the Silence which were the focus of that episode.

The script was originally too long, and as a result many sequences had to be cut, some even after they had been filmed. These included a fight scene with the Doctor and Rosanna's steward (Simon Gregor), a longer fight sequence between Rory and Francesco, and some dialogue between the Doctor and Amy following the climax. In the original script, Amy and Rory cornered Francesco after suspecting him of killing a villager and Francesco climbed up the wall. Whithouse thought this would be a relatively easy stunt, but was told it would be too hard to accomplish and Whithouse revised it to Francesco simply running away. When discussing the script with Whithouse, Helen McCrory, who portrayed Rosanna, thought that she should hurt Amy at some point and so her biting Amy while she is in the chamber was added.

=== Filming and effects ===
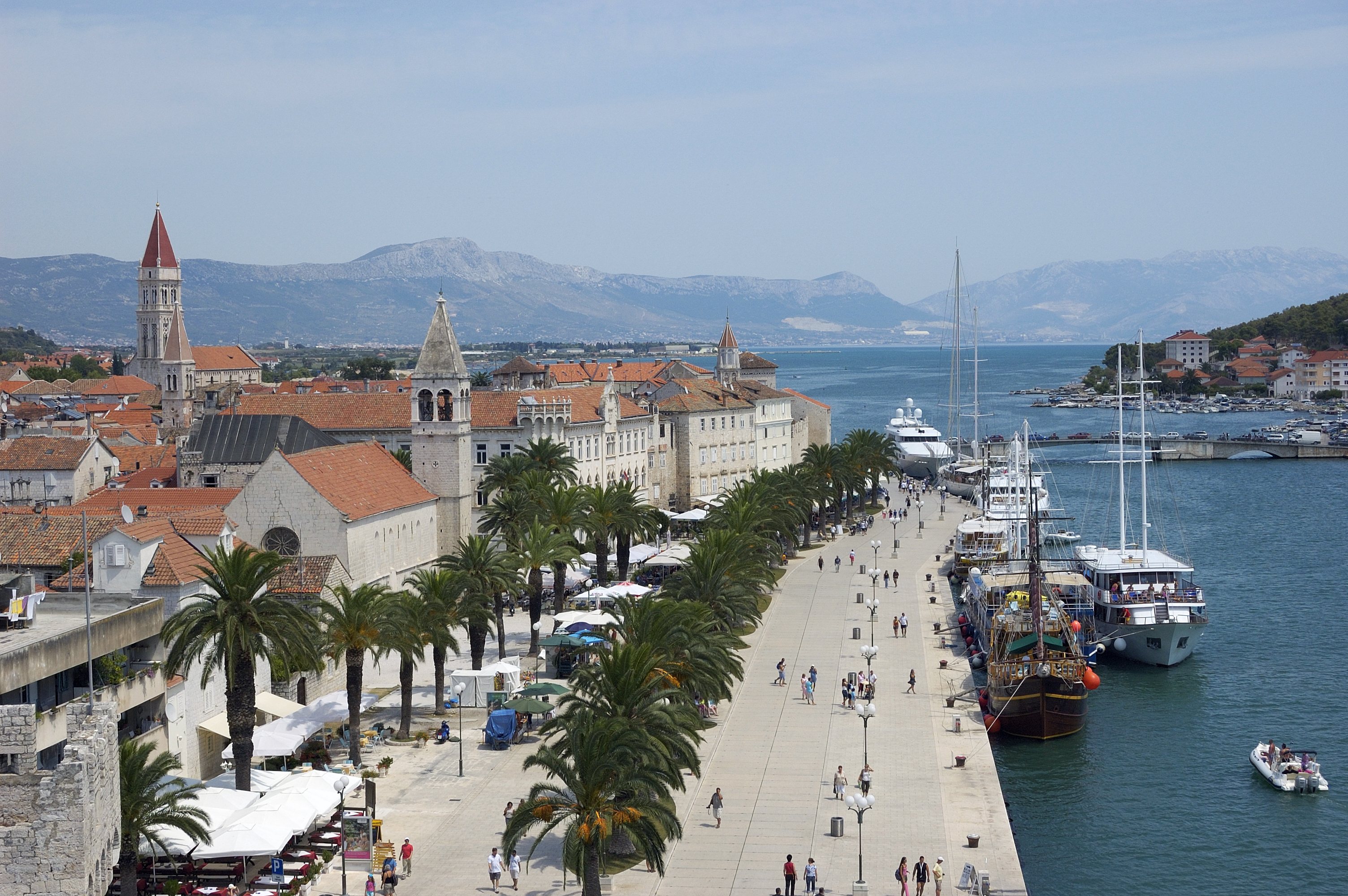
Trogir, Croatia was used as the filming location for 16th-century Venice.

The read-through of "The Vampires of Venice" took place on 23 November 2009. It is the first Doctor Who episode to be directed by Campbell and the first co-produced by Patrick Schweitzer. The episode was filmed in the fifth production block with "Vincent and the Doctor". Due to the fact it would take time to cover up all the modern shops found in present-day Venice, the episode was filmed in the coastal town of Trogir, Croatia in late 2009. The Venetians had actually colonised Trogir, and the city bears much historical architecture, including some that was influenced by Venice. The interior of the Calvierri house was filmed at Atlantic College, Caerphilly Castle, Castell Coch, and the Town Hall of Trogir, while the Llancaich Fawr Manor, a 16th-century manor house near Cardiff, was used as Guido's home. The production team incorporated the Calvierri crest into as many locations as possible and the art department designed a "fish gargoyle" for the tower of the Calvierri house. A church tower in Trogir was used for the climax; this scene was challenging to film because of the stunts for Smith and a stunt double. The roof of the tower was constructed in the studio and some of the scene was filmed there in front of a greenscreen.

The gondolas were filmed in the moat on Caerphilly Castle and inserted with CGI. Locals were used in the marketplace, including a woman who had passed by the filming site with her goat. A small crew did go to Venice to take wide shots of the buildings that bordered the water but did not have walkways as they did in Trogir. Campbell wanted to incorporate everything he loved about Venice, including church bells and narrow alleyways. Though Trogir was on the coast, it did not have internal waterways, so the production team found they could fill a square on the street below the balcony where the characters were with computer generated water and make it part of the Grand Canal. The chamber in which the girls were taken to be turned into the Saturnynians was bathed in a green light to suggest alien technology and also ease the brief glimpse of Rosanna's true form. The cinematographer accomplished this despite the low ceilings. Parts of this scene were cut due to censorship issues for being "too scary".

Several aspects of the episode had to be compromised due to budget constraints. The true form of the aliens could only be shown for a few seconds each as it was very expensive to do, and these shots were spread throughout the episode. In the original script a big monster rose out of the water in Isabella's death scene, but this would have been too expensive and Moffat was forced to ask Whithouse to make it "invisible". Many of the costumes in the episode were taken from artwork from the 15th and 16th centuries. This included veils that women wore, which were used for the vampire girls. Guido trades clothes with Rory when Rory must disguise himself as a Venetian to enter Amy into the school; this was an idea of Moffat's which Whithouse was against as he thought Guido was a "tragic character", but he eventually thought the sight of the character in Rory's stag party T-shirt was funny. McCrory's costume was designed to be similar to her alien creature to make the transition smooth. McCrory was coached to move like a fish, which she pursued diligently. Each pair of teeth for the vampires was unique and moulded to their mouths. They were hard to speak with and Alex Price's lines were re-voiced, though he commented he got "quite good" at speaking with them.

== Broadcast and reception ==
"The Vampires of Venice" was first broadcast in the United Kingdom on BBC One on 8 May 2010. Due to an extended episode of Over the Rainbow which was shown afterwards, the episode aired at 6:00 p.m., the earliest start time for a Doctor Who episode since the series was revived in 2005. Perhaps due to this, the episode received the lowest overnight figures of the series at time of broadcast: 6.17 million on BBC One and simulcast BBC HD. When final consolidated ratings were calculated, it was shown that the episode had been watched by a total of 7.68 million viewers, coming in fifth place on BBC One for the week. The episode received an Appreciation Index of 86, considered "excellent".

"The Vampires of Venice" was released in Region 2 on DVD and Blu-ray with the preceding episodes "The Time of Angels" and "Flesh and Stone" on 5 July 2010. It was then re-released as part of the Complete Fifth Series boxset on 8 November 2010.

=== Critical reception ===
The episode received mixed reviews. Daniel Martin, writing for The Guardian on guardian.co.uk, described it as "beautifully shot" and went on to write: "the way every part of the vampire mythos was explained away by Who pseudo-science was delightful; the stand-off between the Doctor and Rosanna was beautifully played; the dialogue as cracking as you'd expect from Whithouse...and the climactic shot of the Doctor scaling the tower in the rain was just the correct level of broad brushstroke". SFX reviewer David Bradley also reacted positively, giving the episode four out of five stars. He assessed it as "better structured, funnier and more absorbing" than the previous single episode "Victory of the Daleks" and praised the comedy and acting of Alex Price. However, he thought the "expensive-looking locations are let down by shonky special effects".

Gavin Fuller gave the episode a negative review in The Daily Telegraph, calling it "highly disappointing" and "a tragically wasted opportunity." He criticised the writing and plot for "sheer derivativeness", noting that the opening scene was "similar in concept" to Whithouse's previous Doctor Who episode "School Reunion" and thought the "aliens-posing-as-humans idea" was taken from that script as well. He went on to criticise Lucian Msamati as Guido as he "seemed to be taken straight out of Othello", negatively compared the love triangle between the Doctor, Amy and Rory to the storyline with previous characters Rose and Mickey, and thought the ending was too similar to "The Idiot's Lantern" and "Evolution of the Daleks".

Patrick Mulkern, writing for the Radio Times, echoed Fuller's sentiments in his review, saying "I must admit I yawn at aliens disguised as humans. We've seen it so many times now" and noted that Whithouse had used the concept in "School Reunion" and his Torchwood episode "Greeks Bearing Gifts". However, he also thought that "the script delivers lots of heroics and funny moments for the Doctor, Amy and Rory", and he praised the "terrific cast", describing Helen McCrory as "majestic". IGN's Matt Wales rated "The Vampires of Venice" 7 out of 10, saying that it "had plenty of standout moments, even if it didn't quite manage to come together to form a completely satisfying whole". He praised the comedy between Amy and Rory and McCrory's acting, as well as the location shots and Croatia and thought "the sci-fi retcon of classic vampire phenomenon was particularly clever", believing that the aliens went beyond two-dimensional. However, he agreed with Fuller and Mulkern that "its single biggest problem was one of over-familiarity", with many misplaced alien races having featured before.
