= Vincent and the Doctor =

210 – "Vincent and the Doctor"
- Doctor Who episode
- Tony Curran, as Vincent van Gogh, is compared to a self-portrait of his character.

Cast
- Doctor: Matt Smith – Eleventh Doctor
- Companion: * Karen Gillan – Amy Pond
- Others: Tony Curran – Vincent van Gogh; Nik Howden – Maurice; Chrissie Cotterill – Mother; Sarah Counsell – Waitress; Morgan Overton, Andrew Byrne – School Children; Bill Nighy – Dr Black (uncredited)

Production
- Directed by: Jonny Campbell
- Written by: Richard Curtis
- Produced by: Tracie Simpson; Patrick Schweitzer
- Executive producers: Steven Moffat; Piers Wenger; Beth Willis
- Music by: Murray Gold
- Production code: 1.10
- Series: Series 5
- Running time: 45 minutes
- First broadcast: 5 June 2010

Chronology
← Preceded by "Cold Blood"	Followed by → "The Lodger"

"Vincent and the Doctor" is the tenth episode of the fifth series of British science fiction television series Doctor Who, first broadcast on BBC One on 5 June 2010. It was written by Richard Curtis and directed by Jonny Campbell and featured an uncredited guest appearance from actor Bill Nighy.

Intrigued by an ominous figure in Vincent van Gogh's June 1890 painting The Church at Auvers, alien time traveller the Doctor (Matt Smith) and his companion Amy Pond (Karen Gillan) go back in time to meet van Gogh (Tony Curran) and discover that Auvers-sur-Oise has been plagued by an invisible creature, known as the Krafayis, which only van Gogh can see. The Doctor and Amy work with van Gogh to defeat the Krafayis, but in their attempt to have van Gogh realise his legacy through bringing him to the future they ultimately realise that not all of time can be rewritten and there are some evils which are out of the Doctor's reach.

Curtis, inspired by the fact that van Gogh never knew he would be famous, had the idea for an episode centred on him. He left the script open to criticism from the crew and made many revisions as a result. Curtis wanted to portray van Gogh truthfully, rather than being cruel by writing jokes about his mental illness. Most of the episode was filmed in Trogir, Croatia, and many of the sets were modelled after van Gogh paintings.

The episode was watched by 6.76 million viewers on BBC One and BBC HD. Reception to the episode was mainly positive. Reviewers praised Curran's performance as van Gogh, but thought that the Krafayis was not a sufficiently threatening "monster".

== Plot ==
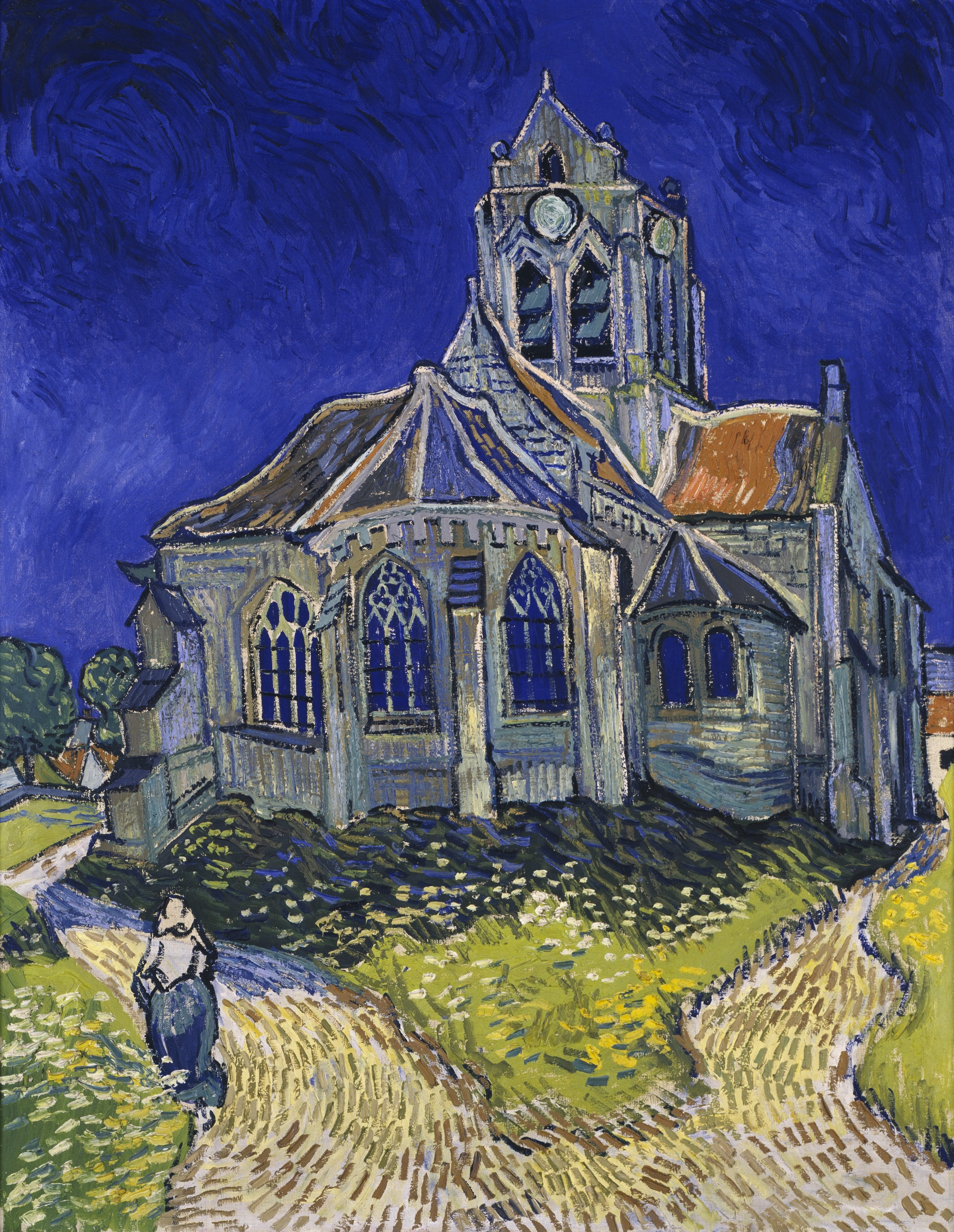
The Church at Auvers, van Gogh's 1890 painting where the Krafayis's face appears.

=== Synopsis ===
The Eleventh Doctor takes Amy to the Musée d'Orsay in Paris, where they admire the work of the Post-Impressionist painter Vincent van Gogh. The Doctor discovers a seemingly alien figure in a window of the 1890 painting The Church at Auvers, and decides they must travel back in time to speak with Vincent. In 1890 France, (Note: Though Arles and Auvers-sur-Oise are not nearby in real life, dialogue at 22:50 places Vincent travelling to the church from The Church at Auvers (1890) the day after the Krafayis attack outside the bedroom from Bedroom in Arles (1888).) they find Vincent, a lonely man, at a café. A young girl is murdered outside the café. When the trio go out to see what happened they are stoned by locals who blame Vincent's insanity for the killing. The Doctor and Amy talk Vincent into letting them stay the night and they return to his home.

That evening, Vincent confesses that his works have little value to anyone else. Amy goes outside and is attacked by a creature that only Vincent is able to see. He sketches it for the Doctor, who identifies it as a Krafayis. After initially feeling distraught that everyone leaves him, Vincent joins the Doctor and Amy at the church to paint it. Vincent begins painting and soon spots the Krafayis inside the church. Vincent saves the Doctor and Amy from the Krafayis, which the Doctor realises is blind. The Krafayis is fatally impaled on Vincent's easel when it tries to lunge at Vincent. Vincent empathises with its pain.

The Doctor and Amy take Vincent in the TARDIS to the van Gogh exhibit at the Musée d'Orsay. Vincent is stunned by the display and becomes emotionally overwhelmed when he overhears art curator Dr. Black say that Vincent was "the greatest painter of them all" and "one of the greatest men who ever lived". They return an emotionally changed Vincent to the past and say their goodbyes. As the Doctor and Amy return to the present, Amy is confident that there will be hundreds of new paintings by Vincent waiting for them, though the Doctor is less certain. Amy is crushed to learn that Vincent still killed himself weeks after their adventure, at the age of 37. The Doctor explains that life is a mixture of bad and good, and while their brief encounter with Vincent could not undo all of the bad, they added some good to his life. The evidence is in Vincent's displayed works: the face no longer appears in The Church, and now Vase with 12 Sunflowers bears the inscription, "For Amy".

=== Continuity ===
Images of the First and Second Doctors are displayed on the Doctor's mirror device and printout from the TARDIS's typewriter. The episode presents these trips as the Doctor's compensation to Amy for her fiancé Rory Williams' death in the previous episode, which Amy herself does not remember since Rory was consumed by a crack in the universe and thus erased from time. Van Gogh is able to sense Amy's sadness at Rory's death, and the Doctor later accidentally addresses Amy and Vincent as Amy and Rory, respectively.

== Production ==
=== Writing ===
"I'm terrifically moved by the life and fate of van Gogh. He's probably the single great artist – in all formats – who received no praise whatsoever for his work. If you look back at Dickens, Chaucer, Shakespeare, Michelangelo, Leonardo da Vinci...all hugely famous in their lives. And then this one incredibly popular artist with no praise at all, literally selling the one painting. It was that thought which initially made me wonder whether or not we could use time travel to put that right. That was the initial inspiration for writing the episode."

— Richard Curtis

Writer Richard Curtis was previously executive producer on the Doctor Who spoof The Curse of Fatal Death, a one-off comedy special written for Comic Relief by show-runner Steven Moffat. Based on this experience, Moffat asked Curtis to write an episode of Doctor Who. Curtis had enjoyed the show's historical episodes and felt comfortable writing one. He had the idea of a story centred on van Gogh for "a long while" and was particularly interested in the fact van Gogh never knew he would be famous, as well as his inspirational story. Curtis was also interested in depression and the price paid for it. He wanted to convey that the Doctor could rewrite time, but van Gogh's "demons" were out of his reach. Moffat was "enthusiastic" about the story idea.

Curtis asked Moffat to criticise "anything and everything" and later said he was very honest. Executive producer Piers Wenger and director Jonny Campbell also critiqued the script. Moffat told Curtis that it needed to "start quicker" and that the meeting with the Doctor and Vincent was "dull" and needed to be something "cute" like Curtis had done in his films. He also noted that the Doctor did not talk as much as Curtis had written and recommended Curtis watch some episodes to see he was "rather efficient in the way that he talked". Curtis enjoyed the experience, commenting that it was "fun" to work within boundaries rather than doing it all himself. After seeing a read-through performed by leads Matt Smith and Karen Gillan, Curtis made more changes. He commented that it was easy to write for them as they were "so delightful and modern and relaxed". Curtis's original title for the episode was "Eyes That See the Darkness", but he said this was vetoed.

Curtis wanted to write for Doctor Who because he thought it would be "something my kids would like." When writing "Vincent and the Doctor", Curtis put up prints of van Gogh paintings around the house as well as a board with index cards outlining the plot. His children helped him come up with some ideas. Gillan commented that the story had a different style and approach and was more character-driven. Though it was a subject he knew "quite a lot" about, Curtis still read a 200-page biography of van Gogh, which was more research than he normally would have done if working on other projects; he took van Gogh very seriously. As such, he wanted to be "truthful rather than cruel" and refused to write any jokes about van Gogh's ears after he famously cut one of them off. However, he did incorporate other humour as he naturally wanted to "try to make things funny".

=== Casting and filming ===
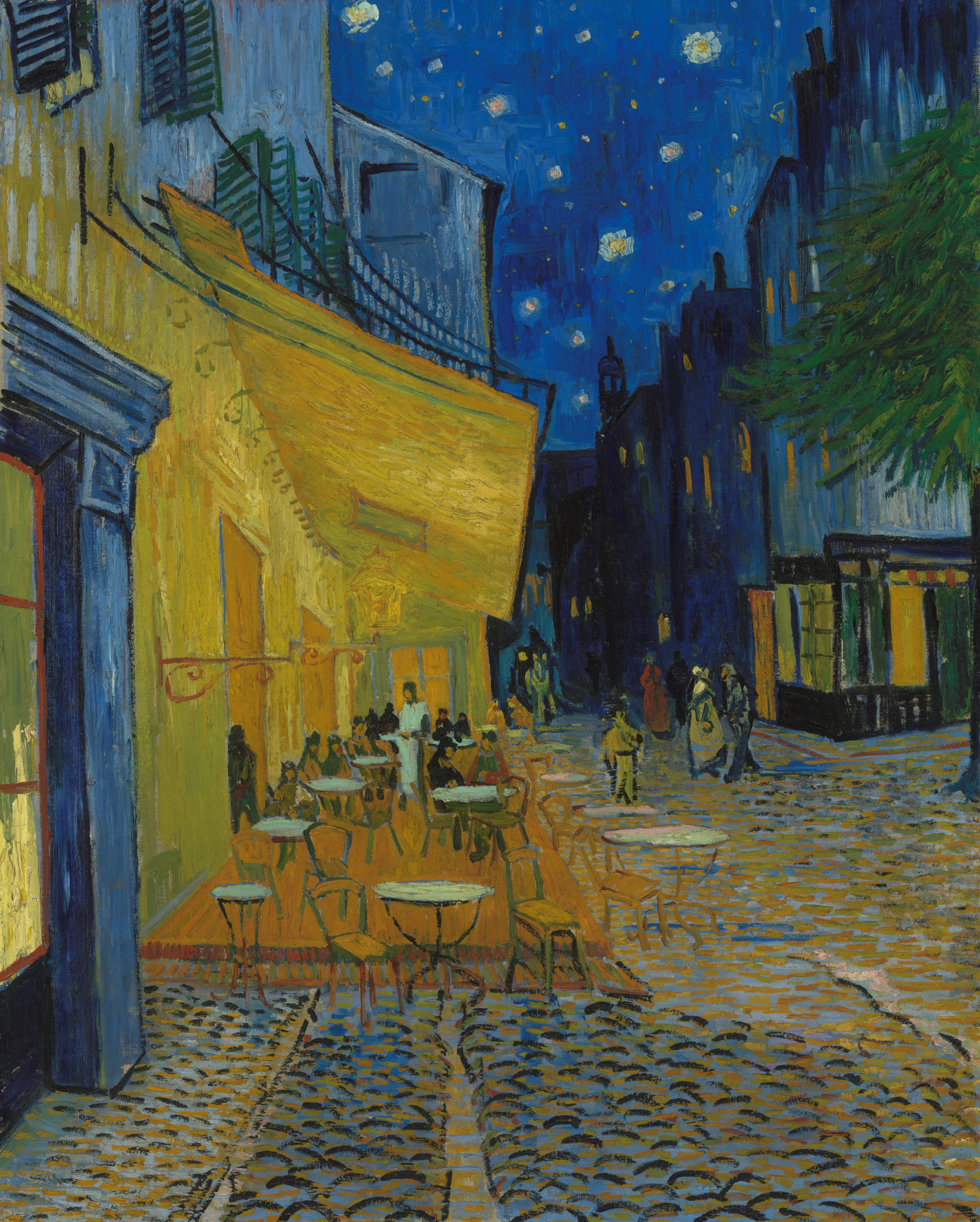
The art department remade a café in Croatia to resemble the one in this 1888 van Gogh painting, Café Terrace at Night.

Curtis stated that casting an actor to play van Gogh was done carefully, as he wanted him to feel to the audience as van Gogh, not "like a bloke they've seen acting lots of other parts, in an orange wig". Tony Curran was ultimately cast as the part; Curtis called him a "wonderful actor" who "really could not look more like" van Gogh. Curran, Smith and Gillan got to know each other very well, which Gillan hoped would be evident in their chemistry in the episode. Bill Nighy appears uncredited as the Musée d'Orsay's expert on van Gogh. Nighy was rumoured to have been considered for the role of the Ninth Doctor when the show was revived. Campbell stated that they were "very fortunate" to have Nighy in the role, who he believed was someone people paid attention to, and the audience needed to pay attention to his character as he related facts which would become important later in the story.

The episode was filmed on location in Trogir, Croatia, in the same production block as "The Vampires of Venice", which sees Trogir depicting 16th-century Venice. Filming took place around November 2009. The scenes at the church were filmed at Llandaff Cathedral in Wales, while the National Museum Cardiff doubled for the interior of the Musée d'Orsay. Some of the sets were intended to reference paintings, such as van Gogh's bedroom. One such set was the café where the Doctor and Amy first meet van Gogh, which was modelled after the painting Café Terrace at Night. This proved challenging for the art department, which looked extensively for a suitable building in Croatia to use. Once the artists found the one they wanted, they had to redesign it to look like the painting; this involved putting an awning up, changing the windows, and adding a platform with tables and chairs. The song played during the ending scene is "Chances" by the British rock band Athlete.

== Broadcast and reception ==
"Vincent and the Doctor" was first broadcast in the United Kingdom on BBC One and simulcast on BBC HD on 5 June 2010. Initial overnight ratings showed that the episode was watched by 5 million, the second rated show of the day and the first on BBC One. Final consolidated ratings rose to 6.76 million, with 6.29 on BBC One and a further 0.47 on BBC HD. It was the second-most-watched programme on BBC One and the highest on BBC HD. It was given an Appreciation Index of 86, considered "excellent".

After the original broadcast, viewers were offered a helpline if they had been affected by the issues raised in the programme. "Vincent and the Doctor" was released in Region 2 on DVD and Blu-ray on 6 September 2010 with "The Lodger", "The Pandorica Opens" and "The Big Bang". It was then re-released as part of the Complete Fifth Series boxset on 8 November 2010.

=== Critical reception ===
Since its broadcast, "Vincent and the Doctor" has received mainly positive reviews. Dave Golder of SFX magazine gave the episode five out of five stars, calling it "a genuinely magical episode of Who, high on atmosphere...and bursting with charm". John Moore, writing on Den of Geek, also took a positive stance towards the episode, describing it as "life-affirming" as a Doctor Who fan, and, though he did criticise some elements of the plot, likewise wrote positively about the ending, ultimately finding the episode "utterly useless, but absolutely art". Keith Watson in the Metro was surprised by the "impressive imagining of Van Gogh's world", praising Curtis's humour throughout the episode. He also praised the performance by Curran as van Gogh, feeling that, with regard to van Gogh's depression, the producers "pulled it off" against the odds. Mark Lawson of The Guardian praised it as "exceptionally good" and "thrilling and funny, as well as educational", noting its "historical rigour" and its "good arty jokes", while Deborah Orr wrote that it was "hardly original for someone to alight on [van Gogh's] tale as a tear-jerker, although it is pretty shrewd to think of placing it in a popular time-travel context" and that "the feeling that I'd been gently monstered into life-affirming feel-good sobs by Richard Curtis was not new, not in the least".

In the mainstream press, Tom Sutcliffe in The Independent praised the episode as "first ingenious and then decidedly poignant", though he felt some aspects of the plot would have wider implications not addressed in the episode, and remained "coldly unfeeling" towards the death of the Krafayis. Sam Wollaston of The Guardian liked the episode, considering Curtis's dialogue to be "witty and clever" and, despite feeling that some of the moral sentiments expressed during the episode were "as schmaltzy as sugary gloop", described how the emotion of the episode eventually got to him. On The Guardian film blog, Peter Bradshaw considered "Vincent and the Doctor" to be a "terrifically clever, funny, likeable wildly surreal episode". He praised the "unmistakably Curtis dialogue" and the "uproariously emotional ending of the sort only Richard Curtis could get away with". Dan Martin on the same paper's regular Doctor Who blog was more critical, writing that its "main problem [was] that it doesn't feel much like a Doctor Who story" and would have worked better if "the middle section with the monster had been stripped out". He also criticised the script for its "lashings of weapons-grade sentimentality" and for "throwing up possibilities that weren't followed up" and the monster as an "afterthought [posing]...no tangible threat". He praised Curran's "great performance" along with the episode's treatment of depression, concluding like Wollaston that he enjoyed the episode despite his misgivings.

Matt Wales on IGN gave it a 7.5 out of 10 rating. He was positive toward Curran and Gillan and that the episode "finally gave us a three-dimensional Amy Pond", but thought the "usually excellent" Smith "didn't get much to work with". He also thought that the Krafayis was "a nice idea" for being a metaphor but was not threatening, and he labelled the emotional ending as "self-indulgently mawkish". The A.V. Club's Keith Phipps gave the episode a B−, explaining that it "didn't quite work" and suffered from tonal problems.

A more negative review came from Gavin Fuller in The Telegraph, who criticised it as a "bland, inconsequential episode that, once it set up what was a decent enough premise...completely failed to run with it". He compared it unfavourably with the third series episode "The Shakespeare Code" in being centred round a historical "tormented artist" but wrote that it lacked that episode's "narrative drive", with "a serious plot hole" in van Gogh's ability to see the creature and that the Krafayis were "the most pointless monsters ever to appear in the series' long history". He also criticised Smith's Doctor and wrote that van Gogh still committing suicide despite the trip to the Orsay was "nonsensical". He did, however, praise "the Doctor's homily about good things and bad things" (though Sam Wollaston criticised this speech in The Guardian) and was grateful that Curtis "avoided turning the Doctor into a bumbling Hugh Grant character from his romcoms", concluding however "he did little else right and a crushing disappointment was the result".

The scene of van Gogh visiting the Gallery has received particular praise, with Curtis stating the scene has transcended the episode. The speech given by Dr Black, and Vincent’s response, has especially become popular, highlighting the hopefulness of the series as a whole, and the Eleventh Doctor in particular.

=== Awards and nominations ===
"Vincent and the Doctor" was nominated for the Bradbury Award for Outstanding Dramatic Presentation in the 2010 Nebula Awards and the 2011 Hugo Award for Best Dramatic Presentation (Short Form). It lost both of these; the Bradbury to the film Inception and the Hugo to the series finale "The Pandorica Opens"/"The Big Bang". In Canada's Constellation Awards, Curran was nominated (alongside Smith) for Best Actor and Curtis for Best Script; Curran came in sixth with 10% of the votes and Curtis came in second, losing out to Christopher Nolan's Inception by one percent of the vote.
