= Victory of the Daleks =

Episode of British sci-fi TV series

205 – "Victory of the Daleks"
- Doctor Who episode

Cast
- Doctor: Matt Smith – Eleventh Doctor
- Companion: Karen Gillan – Amy Pond
- Others: Ian McNeice – Churchill; Bill Paterson – Edwin Bracewell; Nina de Cosimo – Blanche; Tim Wallers – Childers; Nicholas Pegg – Dalek 1; Barnaby Edwards – Dalek 2; Nicholas Briggs – Dalek voices; Susannah Fielding – Lilian; James Albrecht – Todd; Colin Prockter – Air Raid Warden

Production
- Directed by: Andrew Gunn
- Written by: Mark Gatiss
- Produced by: Peter Bennett
- Executive producers: Steven Moffat; Piers Wenger; Beth Willis
- Music by: Murray Gold
- Production code: 1.3
- Series: Series 5
- Running time: 45 minutes
- First broadcast: 17 April 2010

Chronology
← Preceded by "The Beast Below"	Followed by → "The Time of Angels"

"Victory of the Daleks" is the third episode in the fifth series of British science fiction television series Doctor Who. Written by Mark Gatiss and directed by Andrew Gunn, it was first broadcast on BBC One on 17 April 2010.

In the episode, the Doctor (Matt Smith) and his companion Amy Pond (Karen Gillan) arrive in London during the Blitz, where Winston Churchill (Ian McNeice) has employed "Ironsides", a scientific creation from Professor Bracewell (Bill Paterson) to be used as weapons in the war effort. However, the Doctor recognises the Ironsides as his archenemies the Daleks, who plan to destroy Earth by activating a device located inside Bracewell, an android.

Wishing to incorporate the popular Daleks into the series, showrunner Steven Moffat instructed Gatiss to write an episode about Churchill and the Daleks. The episode introduces a new "Paradigm" of Daleks, which were designed by Gatiss to be bigger and more colourful than the previous variant. "Victory of the Daleks" was seen by 8.2 million viewers on BBC One and BBC HD, placing second for the night it aired. Critical reception was mixed; both McNeice and Paterson's performances were praised, but some felt that the episode was too rushed and would have worked better if it was spread over two episodes.

== Plot ==
=== Synopsis ===
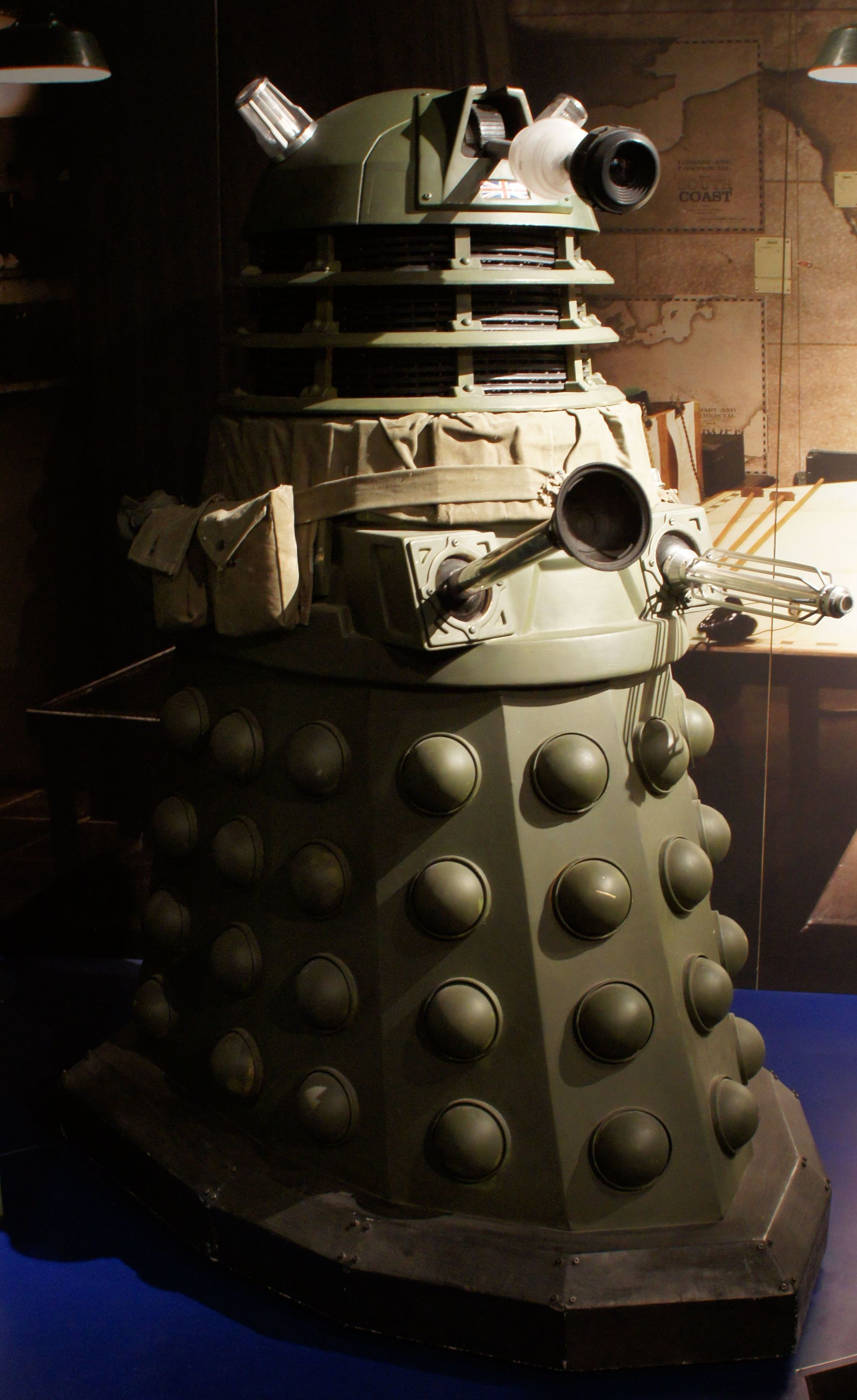
The camouflaged Ironsides in World War II era Britain, as shown at the Doctor Who Experience.

The Eleventh Doctor and Amy land in the Cabinet War Rooms during the Second World War. As the Doctor arrived late, Winston Churchill turned to the scientific advances of Professor Edwin Bracewell, including robotic devices called "Ironsides", which are recognised immediately by the Doctor as his arch-enemies, the Daleks, but act as Bracewell's inventions. The Doctor attacks the devices, shouting "I am the Doctor and you are the Daleks!" Unbeknown to the Doctor and the humans, a Dalek ship is in orbit near the Moon; upon hearing the Doctor's testimony, which has just been transmitted by the Ironsides, the Dalek aboard uses it to activate a Progenitor device and alerts its comrades on Earth. The Daleks reveal their intent and expose Bracewell as an android before returning to their ship. The Doctor follows in the TARDIS, leaving Amy behind for her protection.

The Doctor threatens to destroy the ship, including himself, before the Progenitor completes, as part of the Daleks' plot to restore their race, but the Daleks fire an energy beam at London that lights up the entire city minutes before an air raid by the Luftwaffe, leaving the Doctor's allies vulnerable and creating a stalemate.

When the Progenitor completes, five brand new Daleks in larger, redesigned casings emerge from the Progenitor Chamber. They disintegrate the older "impure" models, who die willingly. At the same time, Amy convinces Churchill and Bracewell to use the technological know-how they have obtained from the Daleks to modify three Spitfires so that they can fly in space. The pilots attack and destroy the dish on the underside of the Dalek ship that was firing the energy beam.

Before the last Spitfire pilot can destroy the ship, the Daleks trigger the power source inside Bracewell that contains an unstable wormhole that will consume Earth if released. The Doctor, torn over defeating the Daleks or saving Earth, orders the Spitfire to stop its attack and returns to Earth. With the Doctor's help, Amy is able to convince Bracewell that he is more human than machine, deactivating the device. The Daleks, having played on the Doctor's compassion for Earth, announce their victory and their ship jumps in time. The Doctor and Amy remove all the advanced Dalek technology, apart from Bracewell, despite Churchill wanting to use it for the war.

=== Continuity ===
Several allusions are made to previous Dalek adventures. In The Power of the Daleks (1966), a resuscitated Dalek declared "I am your servant!", similar to the line "I am your soldier" as used in this episode. The Doctor also expresses a desire to see "the final end" of the Daleks – a direct quotation from The Evil of the Daleks (1967), when his second incarnation expresses the hope that the Daleks have finally been destroyed for good.

The Doctor refers to the events of the previous Dalek invasion of Earth (in "The Stolen Earth" and "Journey's End") when talking to Amy about the Daleks, becoming concerned when Amy does not remember these events. At the end of the episode, a crack is shown in the wall behind where the TARDIS had been parked. The crack, having first appeared in Amy's bedroom when she was a little girl, has been a recurring theme; in "Flesh and Stone" the Doctor discovers it has the power to erase things from existence, the reason Amy cannot remember the Daleks.

== Production ==
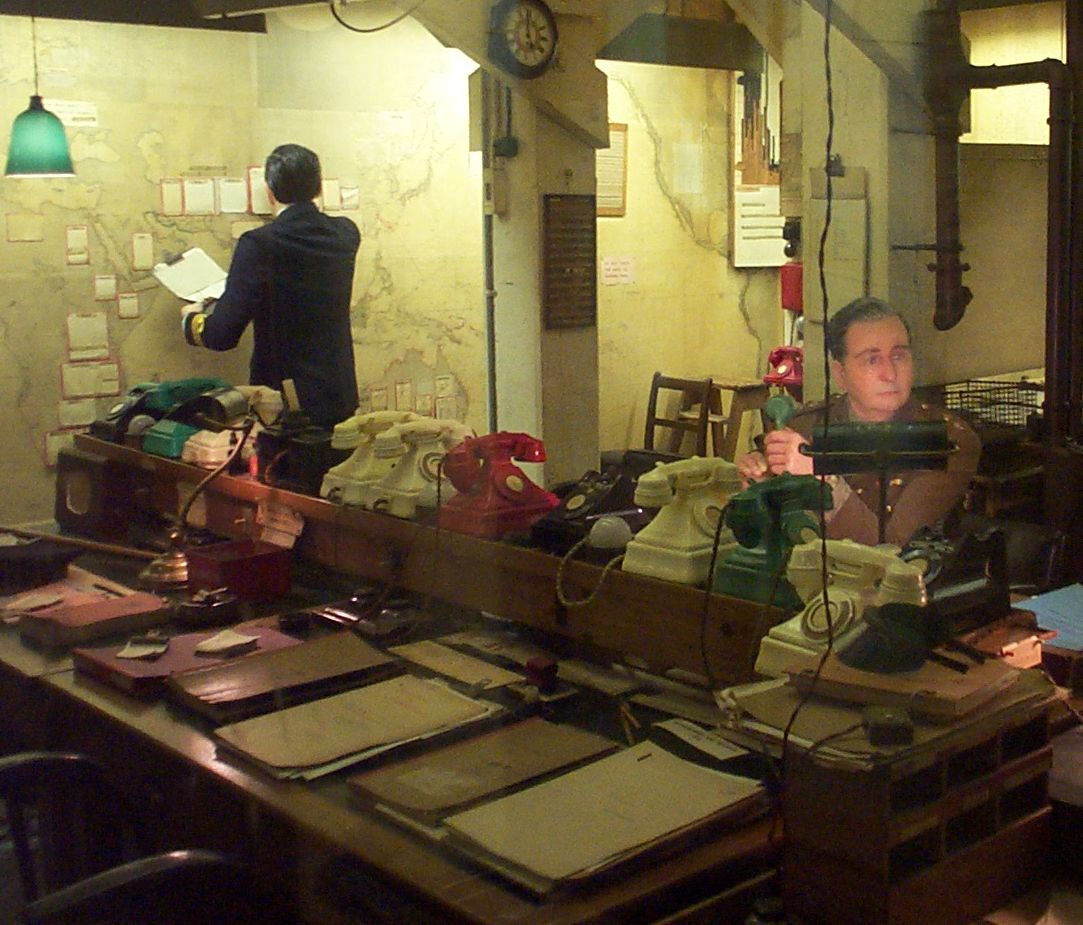
For research, Gatiss visited the Cabinet War Rooms, which were replicated for a set in the episode.

Showrunner Steven Moffat wished to bring back the Daleks, as they were popular among children and had become "one of the regulars". He stated in March 2010 that he and the production team had considered redesigning the Daleks. Mark Gatiss, the writer of the episode, was instructed by Moffat to write an episode about "Churchill versus the Daleks". Gatiss was not sure what to do with the premise at first, but then became excited about doing a war movie, of which he was fond, and his own Dalek story. For research, he visited the real Cabinet War Rooms and read diaries and first-hand accounts of the war. Gatiss's inspiration was the 1966 serial The Power of the Daleks, though he had never seen it due to it being lost, which depicted them as more sly and silent, an aspect he called "very scary, more than when they're just barking orders".

When Gatiss wrote the first draft of the episode Matt Smith had not been cast as the Doctor. Gatiss wrote this early draft for a generic Doctor, though Moffat commented it sounded like Jon Pertwee and Gatiss agreed. Once Smith had been cast, Gatiss watched Party Animals, a television series Smith had previously starred in, as well as anything else Smith was in that he could find. Gatiss used these to "download [his] speech patterns" and examine his energy and phrasing.

Gatiss noted that the Daleks belonged in World War II, as their mission to destroy everything that was not a Dalek was a very Nazi concept. In fact, Terry Nation, the creator of the Daleks who had grown up during World War II, consciously based the Daleks on the Nazis. Smith also drew a parallel between Churchill and the Doctor, as both of them were very intelligent and also had known each other for a long time. A scene cut from the final episode explained how the two had known each other for a while. Gatiss included one of Churchill's favourite expressions "Keep buggering on" (abbreviated KBO) into the script, which he was "delighted" to do. Ian McNeice, who portrayed Churchill, previously played the villain Zeus in the Eighth Doctor Big Finish audio play Immortal Beloved in 2007.

Gatiss wrote in the script for the Daleks' redesign to be "big buggers...bigger than we've seen them before". The eyestalk was designed to be level with Smith's eyeline. Moffat and Gatiss wanted the new Daleks to be very colourful, similar to the Daleks of films from the 60s. Gatiss originally wanted there to be a green Dalek, but he decided that green "just doesn't seem to work somehow". Nick Briggs, who voiced the Daleks, planned to counter their bright colours with a more vicious voice. Moffat wanted to somehow incorporate "Spitfires in space". A replica of a World War II Spitfire was used in front of a greenscreen to shoot the live action parts of the scene and the image of the Spitfire, while the rest of the scene was computer-generated. The sequence contained the line "Broadsword to Danny Boy", a reference to a similar line in the film Where Eagles Dare. Gatiss provided the voice of the Spitfire pilot himself, doing one version clean and another with his hand over his mouth. In an interview in April 2010, Gatiss described how the cameo came about:

When we were filming last summer, someone came up to me and said, "Is it true you're going to play the voice of the Spitfire pilot?" And I said, "No..." The next day, two people approached me and said, "Oh, that's clever – are you doing a cameo as the Spitfire pilot?" And I said, "No..." And then a few weeks ago, Andy Pryor, the casting director, emailed me and said, "I understand you want to play the Spitfire pilot..." I emailed him back and said, "No! But I will if you want me to!"

== Broadcast and reception ==
"Victory of the Daleks" was first broadcast in the United Kingdom on BBC One 17 April 2010. Initial overnight figures showed that the episode was watched by 6.2 million viewers on BBC One and 231,000 watching a simulcast on BBC HD, making it the second most watched programme of the day. Final consolidated ratings for BBC One were 7.92 million and 381,000 for BBC HD, therefore making the total 8.2 million viewers. This made the programme the fourth most watched on BBC One for the week ending 18 April and the eleventh most watched across all UK TV Channels for the same week. It was second for Saturday 17 April, behind Britain's Got Talent, which achieved 11.87 million viewers. It received an Appreciation Index of 84, a little down on the previous two episodes.

=== Critical reception ===
"Victory of the Daleks" received mixed reviews. It received a positive review from Daniel Martin of The Guardian. Martin called it "the best [Mark] Gatiss has written for the show", and praised the writer's investigation of "the idea of [the Daleks] as 'man-made' war machines" for not being "as heavy-handed as you might have expected". He also was positive towards the acting of McNeice and Paterson, the developing storyline between the Doctor and Amy, and positively compared the Daleks' menace to the first series. Patrick Mulkern of the Radio Times hailed the episode as "a victory for all", and praised Gatiss for the character of Professor Bracewell, commenting favourably on how the writer "turns him into an emotive robot like Star Trek's Data, and gives Bill Paterson material worthy of his status."

Jordan Farley of SFX magazine gave "Victory of the Daleks" three and a half out of five stars, praising the redesigned Daleks for being "equally intimidating" and the episode "rollicking good fun", though "a little undercooked". However, he thought that the second half was "a little rushed" and wondered if the episode would have been more successful if it were a two-parter. He also was disappointed with a "lack of quotable dialogue" and less of the Doctor's "playful banter and wacky mannerisms".

Matt Wales of IGN, however, was less positive, and rated the episode 5 out of 10. He called it "a flimsy (if much-needed) excuse to reboot the series' long-time villains rather than an attempt to provide any real narrative meat" but praised the World War II period sets. Brian J. Robb of Total Sci-Fi Online praised McNeice's Churchill, but thought some of his dialogue was over-the-top due to the script which he believed had traces of "having been tampered with" by Moffat. Like Farley, he commented that the episode's pacing was off and would have been more successful as a two-parter. Robb was also critical of Smith's performances, negatively comparing the scenes when he was angry to Sylvester McCoy, as well as the new Dalek design. He gave the episode a final score of 7 out of 10.

== Home media ==
On 7 June 2010, "Victory of the Daleks" was released in Region 2 on DVD and Blu-ray along with the previous episodes "The Eleventh Hour" and "The Beast Below". It was then re-released as part of the complete series five DVD on 8 November 2010. This episode was also released as part of the Doctor Who DVD Files in issue 75, alongside "The Time of Angels" on 16 November 2011.

=== In print ===
Victory of the Daleks
- Author: Peter Gutiérrez
- Series: Doctor Who novelisations
- Publisher: Pearson Education
- Publication date: May 2011
- ISBN: 9781408273876

Pearson Education published a photo-novelisation of this episode by Peter Gutiérrez for school literacy programmes in May 2011.
