= The Lodger (Doctor Who) =

Episode of Doctor Who

211 – "The Lodger"
- Doctor Who episode

Cast
- Doctor: Matt Smith – Eleventh Doctor
- Companion: Karen Gillan – Amy Pond
- Others: James Corden – Craig Owens; Daisy Haggard – Sophie; Owen Donovan – Steven; Babatunde Aleshe – Sean; Jem Wall – Michael; Karen Seacombe – Sandra; Kamara Bacchus – Clubber

Production
- Directed by: Catherine Morshead
- Written by: Gareth Roberts
- Based on: "The Lodger" by Gareth Roberts
- Produced by: Tracie Simpson; Patrick Schweitzer
- Executive producers: Steven Moffat; Piers Wenger; Beth Willis
- Music by: Murray Gold
- Production code: 1.11
- Series: Series 5
- Running time: 45 minutes
- First broadcast: 12 June 2010

Chronology
← Preceded by "Vincent and the Doctor"	Followed by → "The Pandorica Opens"

"The Lodger" is the eleventh episode of the fifth series of the British science fiction television series Doctor Who, first broadcast on BBC One on 12 June 2010. It was written by Gareth Roberts, who based the story on his 2006 Doctor Who Magazine comic strip "The Lodger".

The episode features the Eleventh Doctor (Matt Smith) stranded on Earth and separated from his companion Amy Pond (Karen Gillan), when an unknown force prevents his time travelling spaceship, the TARDIS, from landing. To investigate, he moves into the flat of Craig Owens (James Corden) and attempts to fit in with ordinary humans while unknowingly playing matchmaker for Craig and his good friend Sophie (Daisy Haggard).

Showrunner Steven Moffat was a fan of Roberts' original comic strip and encouraged him to adapt it into an episode for the series. While some elements of the comic strip remain, Roberts wrote most of it from scratch. "The Lodger" replaced a slot held by an episode that was pushed back due to budgetary constraints and was consequently one of the last to be filmed. The episode was watched by a final 6.44 million viewers, the least-watched episode of the fifth series of Doctor Who. However, it achieved the joint highest Appreciation Index of the series at the time of broadcast.

== Plot ==
=== Synopsis ===
After stepping out of the TARDIS in modern-day Colchester, the Eleventh Doctor is blown off his feet by a blast of air, and the TARDIS, with Amy still inside, is thrown into the time vortex and refuses to land. With Amy's help, the Doctor tracks the disturbance to the upstairs flat of a two-storey house. The Doctor opts to take a room for rent offered by the downstairs tenant, Craig Owens, in order to determine what is present on the upstairs flat without alerting whatever it is to his alien technology. The Doctor notices localised time loops and disturbances aboard the TARDIS that coincide with noises from the upstairs flat.

Over two days, the Doctor attempts and struggles to adapt to human life, learning about Craig, an office worker with little aspiration to move onward and partakes in many "human" activities, for example playing in Craig's football team. Craig is stuck in a platonic relationship with his co-worker, Sophie. The Doctor inadvertently encourages Sophie to follow her dream of travelling overseas to help animals. Craig, who has not yet professed his love for Sophie, becomes upset, increasingly exasperated by the Doctor's actions including the Doctor taking authority of Craig's job and the Doctor building a seemingly inexplicable machine in the Doctor's rented room; he accosts the Doctor and demands that he leave, which forces the Doctor to reveal his history and his reason for being in the flat.

Sophie arrives while they argue and is lured upstairs; the Doctor and Craig follow, learning from Amy that Craig's building has never had an upstairs flat. Instead, they find an alien ship housing a time engine. The ship crashed some time ago and has disguised itself as the upstairs flat. The ship's emergency holographic program has been drawing in all passersby desiring to escape in order to find a replacement pilot for itself, but they were killed in each attempt, since humans are incompatible with the ship's controls. The Doctor convinces Craig to touch the controls since he does not want to leave due to his love for Sophie, which will counteract the ship's protocols. Craig does so, and he and Sophie admit their love and share a kiss that breaks the ship's hold on themselves. The three escape as the ship implodes, leaving Craig's one-story flat below undamaged.

Aboard the TARDIS, the Doctor directs Amy to write the note that led him to Craig's house; she rummages around the Doctor's jacket and finds the engagement ring from her fiancé Rory, whom she had forgotten after he was consumed by the crack in space and time and erased from existence. (Note: As depicted in the 2010 episode "Cold Blood".)

=== Continuity ===
On Craig's fridge is a postcard advertising the Van Gogh exhibit at the Parisian Musée d'Orsay, which the Doctor, Amy and Van Gogh himself visited in the previous episode. At the end of the episode, the Doctor instructs Amy to leave him a note with Craig's address, which his younger self had at the start of the episode. Amy is shown leaving the note in the series finale, "The Big Bang", when the Doctor's timeline rewinds and he revisits points in his past. The spaceship control room reappeared in "The Impossible Astronaut"/"Day of the Moon", where it was connected to the Order of the Silence. Corden returned to play Craig in the episode "Closing Time" of the next series, Gareth Roberts' sequel to this story.

== Production ==
"When I was a kid, [The Doctor] was often on Earth, but in an establishment with a bomb or in the headquarters of some organization. We never really saw him pop to the shops. And even in the new series, we've seen him in domestic situations with families, but we've never seen him having to realize the very everyday experience of human life. I came up with the idea years ago as a comic strip in Doctor Who Magazine, so the idea's been there for a very long time. And as soon as Steven Moffat got the job as showrunner of Doctor Who, he turned to me and said, 'We've got to do The Lodger'."

— Gareth Roberts

"The Lodger" is based on a short comic strip of the same name, written by Gareth Roberts for Doctor Who Magazine issue 368 in 2006. The comic features the Tenth Doctor, who spends several days staying in Mickey Smith's flat, waiting for Rose Tyler and the TARDIS to catch him up in a few days, and by chance saving the Earth by hiding it from the passing space fleet of a violent alien race. The story was based on ideas that Roberts had since a child to imagine the Doctor experiencing everyday human life and his enjoyment of stories set on Earth rather than in space. Roberts' original comic strip appealed to new executive producer Steven Moffat, who enthused to Roberts that he had "got to do" "The Lodger" as an episode. Roberts had previously had the idea to make the television version, but he had never mentioned it. Roberts considered "The Lodger" less an adaptation than was previously done by Paul Cornell for "Human Nature"/"The Family of Blood", taken from Cornell's novel, and instead wrote most of the episode from scratch.

During the early writing stages, Roberts had initially planned to make the episode a sequel to the 1980 Doctor Who serial Meglos, with the eponymous antagonist of that story returning whilst disguised as an old woman (with the episode being facetiously referred to by some as "Mrs. Meglos" for this reason). However, this sequel idea would later be dropped due to several concepts within it having already been utilized in multiple other Doctor Who episodes written around the same time; Meglos' cactus-like appearance was deemed to be far too similar to the Vinvocci aliens featured in "The End of Time", and the idea of aliens disguising themselves as elderly people had already been written into "Amy's Choice".

Elements of the comic's story carry over into the episode, such as his confusion between a sonic screwdriver and a toothbrush, and the Doctor's aptitude at football. However, Roberts said that the episode was "a completely different situation" from the comic strip, as the Doctor did not know Craig as he did Mickey, and there was the added enemy of the upstairs apartment. When Roberts began writing for the episode, he knew the series' overarching plot but was not aware who was to be cast as the Eleventh Doctor. Roberts based the Doctor's lines on those written in Moffat's completed scripts and further characterization was added by Matt Smith's reading of the lines.

The episode also contains several cultural references. When the Doctor is having a shower, he is heard singing "La donna è mobile", which his third incarnation sang in Inferno. When the Doctor introduces himself to the time ship's Avatar, he claims to be "Captain Troy Handsome of International Rescue," which is a reference to both Captain Troy Tempest from Stingray and International Rescue from Thunderbirds, both series created by Gerry and Sylvia Anderson. Steven Cooper of Slant Magazine also saw a reference to the Emergency Medical Hologram the Doctor from Star Trek: Voyager, as the Doctor continued "Please state the nature of your emergency."

"The Lodger" made up the seventh and final production block of the series along with "Amy's Choice". The read-through for both episodes took place on 17 February 2010 in the Upper Boat Studios. The story replaced another one, "The Doctor's Wife", when the latter was pushed back to the next series due to budgetary constraints. Location filming took place in Cardiff in early March 2010. The house in which Craig has his flat is in Westville Road, and the location for the football match was Victoria Park; the play area there had previously been used as a location in "Forest of the Dead". Matt Smith performed his own athletics in the football match shots; he has had previous experience as a youth footballer, having played for the youth teams of Northampton Town, Nottingham Forest and Leicester City before a back injury turned him towards acting. As such, little choreography was needed for the sequence.

== Broadcast and reception ==
"The Lodger" was first broadcast in the United Kingdom on BBC One on 12 June 2010. In the United States, it was broadcast on sister station BBC America on 10 July 2010. In the UK, overnight figures for the episode were 4.6 million, facing competition from the build-up to England's opening match in the 2010 FIFA World Cup. When final consolidated ratings were calculated, it showed that the episode was watched by an average of 6.44 million viewers, with 5.98 million on BBC One and a further 0.46 million on a simulcast on BBC HD. It was the sixth highest-rated programme of the week on BBC One, and the twenty-first highest-rated of the week across all channels. Although it was the second most watched programme of the day, it was the least watched fifth series episode of Doctor Who. However, it received an Appreciation Index of 87, considered "excellent" and the joint highest of the series at time of broadcast.

=== Critical reception ===
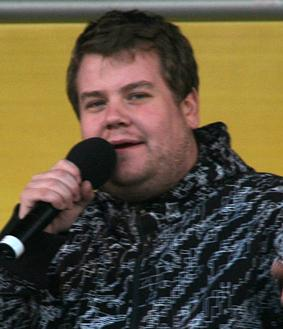
Critics praised the chemistry and acting of Matt Smith and James Corden (pictured).

Gavin Fuller, writing for The Daily Telegraph, called the episode "a delight", "thoroughly enjoyable" and "often amusing". In particular he praised Corden and Haggard for avoiding the usual "cliches of romcom", and Smith's portrayal of The Doctor as almost-but-not-quite human. However, he expressed some disappointment that the origin of the lurking time machine was not explained. Dan Martin of The Guardian called it "one of the strongest episodes of the year". He praised the acting of Smith and Corden, but wondered why the Doctor did not use his usual alias of "John Smith" when posing as a human.

Radio Times reviewer Patrick Mulkern praised Corden and Smith, but said it did not "quite tick [his] boxes". He was not engaged by the upstairs villain, wished for more "laugh-out-loud moments than good-humoured banter" and disliked that the Doctor seemed "diminished" when thrown into the everyday atmosphere. In a review for IGN, Matt Wales rated it 7 out of 10 and referred to it as "one of the fluffier episodes" in terms of plot, but he said it was an "enjoyable little duck-out-of-water adventure". He called Smith "an absolute joy to watch" and said that Corden and Haggard "[acquitted] themselves admirably". However, he criticised the "more traditional Who elements", such as the alien threat that the directing left "devoid of almost all tension", Amy's occasional appearances that did not seem to gel with the rest of the story, and the short resolution, where "the whole thing collapsed into an incomprehensible muddle".

SFX magazine's Russell Lewin gave "The Lodger" three and a half out of five stars, saying it was "brimming with witty dialogue" and was a "pleasant diversion" before the finale. He ranked it "mid-table" among the other episodes of the series. Keith Phipps of The A.V. Club graded it an A−, saying it was a "funny outing" that allowed Smith to show comic depth as the Doctor, as well as praising the guest stars. Though he referred to the alien up the stairs as a "pretty standard-issue", he liked it for being a metaphor of "the trap of complacency and the ways staying in a rut can lead to safety, stagnancy, and ignorance of the peril encroaching just outside one's four walls".

== Home media ==
A Region 2 DVD and Blu-ray containing the episode together with "Vincent and the Doctor", "The Pandorica Opens" and "The Big Bang" was released on 6 September 2010. It was then re-released as part of the complete series five DVD on 8 November 2010.

=== In print ===
The Lodger
- Author: Peter Gutiérrez
- Series: Doctor Who novelisations
- Publisher: Pearson Education
- Publication date: May 2011
- ISBN: 9781408274156

Pearson Education published a photo-novelisation of this episode by Peter Gutiérrez for school literacy programs in May 2011.
