= Andrew Gunn =

Andrew Gunn may refer to:

- Andrew Gunn (director), British television director
- Andrew Gunn (film producer) (1969–2026), Canadian-born American film producer
