= Flesh and Stone =

Episode of Doctor Who

206b – "Flesh and Stone"
- Doctor Who episode

Cast
- Doctor: Matt Smith – Eleventh Doctor
- Companion: Karen Gillan – Amy Pond
- Others: Alex Kingston – River Song; Iain Glen – Father Octavian; David Atkins – Bob/voice of "Angel Bob"; Darren Morfitt – Marco; Mark Monero – Pedro; George Russo – Phillip

Production
- Directed by: Adam Smith
- Written by: Steven Moffat
- Produced by: Tracie Simpson
- Executive producers: Steven Moffat; Piers Wenger; Beth Willis
- Music by: Murray Gold
- Production code: 1.5
- Series: Series 5
- Running time: 2nd of 2-part story, 45 minutes
- First broadcast: 1 May 2010

Chronology
← Preceded by "The Time of Angels"	Followed by → "The Vampires of Venice"

"Flesh and Stone" is the fifth episode of the fifth series of the British science fiction television series Doctor Who. Written by Steven Moffat and directed by Adam Smith, the episode was first broadcast on 1 May 2010 on BBC One. Featuring the Weeping Angels as primary villains and the recurring character River Song (Alex Kingston), it is the conclusion of a two-episode story; the first part, "The Time of Angels", aired on 24 April.

In the episode, the alien time traveller the Eleventh Doctor (Matt Smith), his companion Amy Pond (Karen Gillan), River Song, and Father Octavian (Iain Glen) and his militarised clerics have escaped entrapment by the Weeping Angels, creatures who only move when unobserved by others. They take refuge inside the crashed starship Byzantium, but the Angels pursue them and Amy is on the brink of dying from the imprint of an Angel in her eye. Both the Angels and the Doctor's team face danger from a widening crack in space and time which has the power to erase persons from history.

Moffat wrote the two-part story as a more action-packed sequel to his 2007 episode "Blink", inspired by the relationship between the film Alien and its sequel, Aliens. The episode contains vital information concerning the main story arc of the cracks in time, and contains many instances which are character-motivated. "The Time of Angels" and "Flesh and Stone" were the first two episodes of the fifth series to be filmed; filming for "Flesh and Stone" took place in July 2009, with location filming in Puzzlewood and Southerndown beach. The episode was watched by 8.495 million viewers in the United Kingdom and received mostly positive reviews from critics, though many commented that it did not live up to the quality to the first part and disagreed about the decision to show the Angels moving.

== Plot ==
The Eleventh Doctor, Amy, River, Father Octavian, and Octavian's surviving clerics escape the approaching Weeping Angels when the Doctor destroys the gravity globe illuminating the cave they are in, allowing them to jump up into the artificial gravity of the crashed starship Byzantium. They scramble inside as the Angels start to follow, and the Doctor directs the group to the ship's oxygen factory, a forest contained within the ship. As they pass the primary flight deck, the Doctor notices a crack in its wall just like the one in Amy's bedroom (Note: As depicted in the 2010 episode "The Eleventh Hour".) is leaking time energy from the end of the universe that the Angels are being drawn to.

Amy starts becoming more afflicted by the image of the Angel in her eye, and the Doctor instructs her to keep her eyes closed, preventing her from seeing it. Octavian has the clerics guard Amy while he, the Doctor and River make for a secondary flight deck on the other side of the oxygen factory. During this, the Doctor learns that River is Octavian's prisoner and has been promised a full pardon if she helps capture the Angel. Octavian is killed by an Angel but this allows the Doctor and River to enter and secure the flight deck. They analyse the crack and confirm that the leaking energy came from an explosion in time, and they narrow the date of the explosion's epicenter to Amy's home time.

Meanwhile, the Angels start to move away from the flight deck room. The clerics are erased from time by the crack as it grows wider. River teleports Amy to the secondary flight deck, rescuing her from the Angels. The Angels' energy drain of the Byzantium engines cause the artificial gravity to fail, and the Angels fall into the crack. The crack closes, as the Angels are a sufficiently complex event in space and time to do so. Because the Angel that infected Amy has been erased from time, she is no longer afflicted by it.

River is taken back into custody, but tells the Doctor that they will meet again "when the Pandorica Opens". Amy asks the Doctor to take her back to Earth on the day he took her, and she shows him that she is to be wed the next day, before she tries to seduce him. The Doctor believes the cracks are related to Amy herself, and he brings her inside the TARDIS to "get [her] sorted out".

== Production ==
=== Writing ===
Writer Steven Moffat came up with the concept for "The Time of Angels" and "Flesh and Stone" when he was thinking of the worst possible situations to be in with the Weeping Angels and thought of the inability to see. His first idea was blindness, though this developed into the situation that Amy ends up in. Moffat designed the two-part story to be a more action-oriented sequel to "Blink", an episode he wrote for the third series that introduced the Weeping Angels. He was inspired by the relationship between the film Alien and its sequel, Aliens, which he referred to as "the best conceived movie sequel ever", describing it as being more "highly coloured" as opposed to Alien's more low-key tone. He also intended for the Angels to have a plan that could become "almost like a war", in contrast to the way they were struggling to survive in "Blink". The title "Flesh and Stone" was suggested by Moffat's son.

The episode is also important in the main story arc concerning the cracks in time and space. The idea of the crack was inspired by a similar crack in the wall of Moffat's son's bedroom. As the crack reappears, several facts about it are revealed. In the episode, the Doctor speculates that they are connected to the fact that Amy could not remember the events of several previous episodes, as well as events in history that had occurred in "The Next Doctor". He also discovers that the time explosion that caused the crack is due to occur on 26 June 2010, which is also the original airdate of the final episode of the series, "The Big Bang". Before the Doctor, River, and Octavian leave Amy and the other clerics, the Doctor briefly returns to console Amy and to ask her to trust him and remember what he told her when she was younger; however, the Doctor in this scene is shown wearing his jacket, which he had lost to the Angels earlier in the episode, as well as a different wristwatch. It is revealed in "The Big Bang" that this was in fact the Doctor from later in his timeline, setting up events in Amy's past to try to help her remember him after he has rebooted the universe. River Song tells the Doctor she will see him again when the Pandorica opens; the Pandorica was previously referred to by Prisoner Zero in "The Eleventh Hour" and is revealed in "The Pandorica Opens", which also sees the return of River Song.

Many details of the episode were character-driven. The Angel's wish to torture Amy "for fun" sparked anger in the Doctor, but also gave him courage to defeat the Angels and save Amy. Moffat stated that, in the scene in which the Doctor must work out how to save Amy in a matter of seconds, he was "very basic ... very pure, simple Doctor", and did not have time to comfort Amy because any compassion would get in the way of his reasoning. River was also meant to understand this, and explain to Amy that he needed to think. Moffat believed that Amy was "passionate and a fighter and ... also really smart", which he demonstrated in the scene where Amy could not open her eyes for more than a second but was determined to do it for less than one. Moffat also believed that Amy's attempt to seduce the Doctor was consistent with the character he had built up from her first episode. It reflected the narrow escape from death and challenging experience the two had just shared, and Amy's tendency to do things "in the heat of the moment" – although Moffat later admitted he regretted the way he wrote the scene, saying "I played it for laughs, and it was so wrong". The Doctor's response was intended to be a typically embarrassed and flustered reaction to female behaviour of this kind.

=== Filming and effects ===
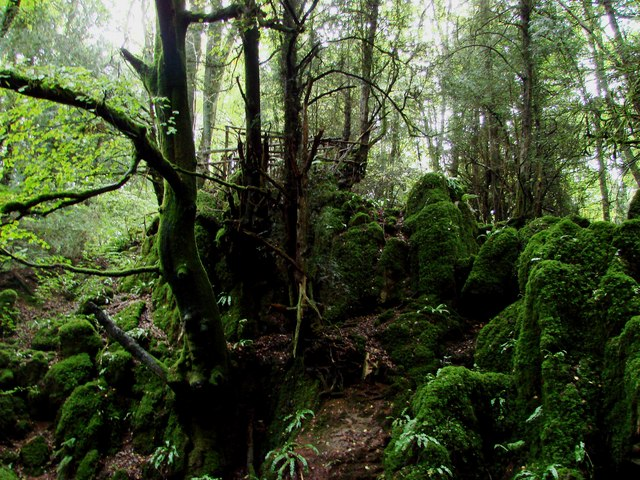
The scenes in the forest were filmed at Puzzlewood in the Forest of Dean.

"The Time of Angels" and "Flesh and Stone" were the first two episodes to be produced in the series. The read-through for "Flesh and Stone" took place on 15 July 2009 following the read-through of "The Time of Angels". The forest scenes in the Byzantium were filmed at Puzzlewood, in the Forest of Dean over nine nights in July 2009. The final scenes on a beach were shot at Southerndown, Vale of Glamorgan in Wales during 20–21 July 2009, the first filming done for the new series.

Most of the Weeping Angels are not statue props but young women wearing masks, costumes, and paint that took two to three hours to apply. Director Adam Smith called them "an absolute nightmare to film with" because it took a long time for them to get ready and they had to stand still for long periods of time. In the climactic scene Gillan had to walk with her eyes closed, which she said was difficult and challenging as the ground was uneven and muddy. She stated that "it was the most scary thing" when she had to trip over a step and fall, even though she was aware of the crash mat. As she was not able to express herself through her eyes, Gillan had to make herself more animated to convey emotion. The scene in which the Doctor, Amy and River are horizontal in mid-air when the gravity field fails on the Byzantium was achieved by using wires and powerful wind machines. The blue in Amy's bedroom was Adam Smith's idea, to show that it was inspired by the TARDIS from Amy's encounter with the Doctor when she was young.

== Broadcast and reception ==
"Flesh and Stone" was first broadcast on BBC One and simulcast on BBC HD on 1 May 2010. Overnight figures showed that "Flesh and Stone" was watched by 6.87 million viewers; 6.53 million watched on BBC One, with a further 0.34 on BBC HD. This was a slight increase from the previous episode, but "Flesh and Stone" was still second for the night behind Britain's Got Talent. Final consolidated ratings showed that 8.495 million viewers had watched the episode, with 8.019 on BBC One and 476,000 on BBC HD, the fifth and first most-watched programme on each channel respectively. It achieved an Appreciation Index of 86, considered "excellent".

=== Critical reception ===
"Flesh and Stone" has received mostly positive reviews. Daniel Martin gave the episode a positive review on The Guardian's guardian.co.uk, saying that it "can lay credible claim to being the greatest episode of Doctor Who there has ever been". He went on to declare: "It's just ridiculously good — so much that there's scarcely any point in picking out moments because there was an iconic sequence every couple of seconds." In particular he praised Father Octavian's death scene, noting how "despair creeps over Matt Smith's face as he realises he is going to have to leave him to die; Octavian's final speech weeps with honour and elegance". IGN's Matt Wales gave the episode a 10 out of 10 rating, saying it was "packed with huge, iconic moments" and stated, "by the end of it, we were left with more questions than answers and a far better sense of Moffat's meticulous planning".

Gavin Fuller, writing for The Daily Telegraph's website, described the episode as "a rollercoaster ride of thrills and spills". He praised the forest scenes, saying they were "easily the highlight of the episode, taking in a whole range of emotions as the nature and scale of the threat facing the Doctor, Amy, River and the clerics shifted as the episode progressed." However he expressed uncertainty over Amy's "attempted seduction of the Doctor", claiming that it "did seem out of keeping with the usual tone of the series", and that "Given the number of young children who watch, it may not have been the most appropriate of scenes to screen". Patrick Mulkern, writing for the Radio Times, gave the episode a positive review, describing it and its predecessor "The Time of Angels" as "two episodes of Who that deserve 10 out of 10 in anybody's scorebook", although he felt that of the two "The Time of Angels" was "marginally more dazzling", as he found the Angels in that episode more "macabre", but he still thought that "Flesh and Stone" "bombards us with shudders and tension". He also stated that he was "much amused by Amy's amorous antics at the end".

Steven Cooper of Slant Magazine called it "an exciting, action-packed roller coaster" and praised director Adam Smith's "top-notch visuals" as well the performances of Smith, Gillan, and Kingston. He noted the difference between Moffat's more obvious story arc as opposed to others in the revived series, believing it to be possibly a "long-overdue innovation" for the show. Though he praised the final defeat of the Angels for making use of what the viewer had forgotten, he thought that being able to see the Angels moving was "creepy and well-done", but made them "much less original and interesting" and the reason behind it weak, considering that the scene had "no significance at all" and was just to fill up time. SFX Magazine's Dave Golder agreed, calling the scene "very creepy" and the Angels moving "effective", but feeling that "these once great monsters come across a bit wussy and stupid". He also thought that it did not live up to the "brilliant first part", feeling "a bit one-note" and lacking "a really good jawdropping revelation". However, he thought it was "a solid, exciting, pulse-pounding 45 minutes" that was "tense, action-packed, and stuffed with memorable one-liners and touching character moments", particularly praising Amy's countdown and Octavian's death, and gave the episode four out of five stars.

== Home media ==
A Region 2 DVD and Blu-ray containing "Flesh and Stone" together with the episodes "The Time of Angels" and "The Vampires of Venice" was released on 5 July 2010. It was re-released as part of the complete series five DVD on 8 November 2010. The DVD also contains a cut scene set between "Flesh and Stone" and "The Vampires of Venice" where the Doctor tries to explain to Amy that he needs companions, not out of any ulterior motive but to help him see the universe with fresh eyes.

=== In print ===
Pearson Education published a novelisation of this episode and "The Time of Angels" under the title The Time of Angels by Trevor Baxendale for school literacy programs in May 2011. BBC Books also will publish a novelisation of this episode and "The Time of Angels" written by Jenny T. Colgan as a paperback, ebook, and an audiobook on 26 March 2026 under the title The Time of Angels as part of the Target Collection.

== Legacy ==
In 2017, Moffat said that he wished he could have changed the kissing scene at the end. He said in a Twitter Q&A, "...there's a brilliant scene to be written there, and I entirely avoided writing it. I played it for laughs, and it was so wrong."
