= Andrew Gunn (director) =

British television director

Andrew Gunn is a British television director. He was born in Staffordshire and later grew up on Tyneside before attending film school in Surrey and Dorset. He has written and directed several award-winning short films in addition to work in popular television drama.

His graduation film Mermaids starred a young Robson Green and won the Young Film-maker award at the Tyneside International Film Festival 1987. Gunn returned to the North East after film school and continued to write and direct short films, most of which were produced and set in Newcastle upon Tyne. Cafe au Lait won a regional Royal Television Society commendation in 1994. Half a Shave, a black comedy based on the short story by Sid Chaplin, starred Frances Tomelty and premiered at the Edinburgh Film Festival in 1996, going on to win a Certificate of Merit at the Chicago International Film Festival. It also won a regional Royal Television Society commendation. Andrew worked as a highly respected focus puller for many years while trying to achieve his ambition of Directing. Gunn’s next film Insomnia starred Andy Serkis and premiered at the Edinburgh Film Festival. It was subsequently screened worldwide. Trigger Happy starred Ian Hart and Christine Tremarco and marked Gunn’s departure from making short films.

Following the success of these films Gunn went on to collaborate with Smack the Pony producer Victoria Pile on the pilot episode of the cult drama sit-com Green Wing. Channel 4 subsequently commissioned two series, the first of which received the Pioneer Audience Award at the BAFTA Television Awards 2005. Although uncredited, Gunn directed numerous scenes in the first episode (Caroline’s First Day) and co-created the visual and editorial style of the show.

In 2006 Gunn directed two of the most well received episodes in season 2 of the cult drama-comedy Life On Mars starring John Simm and Philip Glenister and went on to direct David Morrissey and Lucy Cohu in the climax to Cape Wrath (Meadowlands US), the 2007 flagship high-concept thriller for Channel 4 and Showtime.

Gunn also directed the feature-length adaptation of David Almond’s Clay for BBC 1, starring Oscar nominee and BAFTA award-winner Imelda Staunton. In 2008 Gunn continued to direct high-concept-high-profile productions, most recently two of the opening episodes of Survivors, the BBC’s eagerly anticipated re-make of the 1970s cult science fiction drama starring Julie Graham and Max Beesley.

== Filmography ==
- Green Wing (2004)
- Cape Wrath (2007)
- Life on Mars (2007)
- Survivors (2008)
- Clay (2008)
- Primeval (2008)
- Doctor Who (2010)
- Wolfblood (2012) - five episodes
- Get Even (2020) - five episodes
