= Tracie Simpson =

British television producer

Tracie Simpson is a British television producer. Her career had predominantly been as a production manager, in which capacity she worked on the revived series of Doctor Who until 2007, and in 2009 returned to produce three of the 2008-10 specials, starting with "Planet of the Dead".

She remained as a full-time producer (alongside Peter Bennett) for the fifth series of the programme.

Between 2011 and 2013 she was a line producer of Casualty. She returned to Doctor Who in 2014, working as line producer or production executive. She confirmed that Season 13 filming would commence in autumn 2020.

Preceded by Susie Liggat	Doctor Who Producer; 2009–10	Succeeded by Nikki Wilson
