= Doctor Who series 6 =

2011 season of British sci-fi TV series

Doctor Who
- Series 6
- DVD box set cover art
- Showrunner: Steven Moffat
- Starring: Matt Smith; Karen Gillan; Arthur Darvill
- No. of stories: 11
- No. of episodes: 13 (+1 special)

Release
- Original network: BBC One
- Original release: 23 April – 1 October 2011

Series chronology
- ← Previous; Series 5 Next → Series 7

The sixth series of British science fiction television programme Doctor Who was shown in two parts. The first seven episodes were broadcast from April to June 2011, beginning with "The Impossible Astronaut" and ending with mid-series finale "A Good Man Goes to War". The final six episodes aired from August to October, beginning with "Let's Kill Hitler" and ending with "The Wedding of River Song". The main series was preceded by "A Christmas Carol", the 2010 Christmas special. The series was led by head writer and executive producer Steven Moffat, alongside executive producers Beth Willis and Piers Wenger. Sanne Wohlenberg, Marcus Wilson, and Denise Paul served as producers. The series was the sixth to air following the programme's revival in 2005 after the classic era aired between 1963 and 1989, and is the thirty-second season overall.

The series stars Matt Smith as the eleventh incarnation of the Doctor, an alien Time Lord who travels through time and space in his TARDIS, a spacecraft whose exterior resembles a British police box. It also stars Karen Gillan and Arthur Darvill as his companions, newlyweds Amy Pond and Rory Williams. Alex Kingston also returns as River Song, a mysterious woman from the Doctor's future who is revealed throughout the series to be Amy and Rory's part-Time Lord daughter and the Doctor's wife. In addition to Song, the series continues story threads from the fifth series, most notably the Silence and the cause of the TARDIS exploding in "The Big Bang".

== Episodes ==
This series was the first to include a mid-season broadcast break since Season 18, with twelve weeks between the transmissions of "A Good Man Goes to War" and "Let's Kill Hitler".

No. story	No. in series	Title	Directed by	Written by	Original release date	Prod. code	UK viewers (millions)	AI
Special
213	–	"A Christmas Carol"	Toby Haynes	Steven Moffat	25 December 2010	2.X	12.11	83
A space liner containing 4,000 people and Amy Pond and Rory Williams on their honeymoon becomes caught in an electrified cloud. The Doctor, summoned by Amy, lands on the planet beneath and discovers that the atmosphere is controlled by the miserly Kazran Sardick, who refuses to let the ship safely land. The Doctor travels back to Kazran's youth and attempts to alter his past to make him kinder, spending time adventuring with young Kazran and a young woman named Abigail, who was released from a cryogenic chamber as her singing abilities calm the sharks which occupy the atmosphere. However, Abigail was suffering from an incurable disease, and Kazran grows up bitter that she cannot be let out again or she will die; but the Doctor shows Kazran's younger self what he would become and he decides to release the ship. Unfortunately, Kazran's personality has changed too much for the atmosphere controls to recognise him, and the Doctor must convince Kazran to release Abigail so she can sing and calm the atmosphere, and the two enjoy their last time together.
Part 1
214a	1	"The Impossible Astronaut"	Toby Haynes	Steven Moffat	23 April 2011	2.1	8.86	88
Amy, Rory and River Song receive invitations to the Utah desert where they meet the Doctor, who claims to be nearly 200 years older than when they had last seen him and says that he will take them to "Space: 1969". As they dine beside Lake Silencio they witness an unknown figure in a spacesuit kill the Doctor and are then met by an old man called Canton Everett Delaware III, who had also been invited. They meet a younger version of the Doctor who had been invited and land in the Oval Office in 1969, where they are enlisted by President Nixon to assist a younger version of Canton in saving a terrified little girl from a mysterious spaceman. The Doctor traces her to a warehouse in Florida where they investigate, unaware that the warehouse contains creatures which they forget after looking away from. After Amy tells the Doctor she is pregnant, the little girl appears in a spacesuit and Amy shoots at her.
214b	2	"Day of the Moon"	Toby Haynes	Steven Moffat	30 April 2011	2.2	7.30	87
Amy's shot had missed and she, Rory, and River spend three months searching for the creatures, the Silence, while the Doctor and the TARDIS are held in Area 51. The group reunites and discuss the Silence, which have been found throughout America and have the ability to implant post-hypnotic suggestions in humans. Amy and Canton visit the orphanage where the little girl was kept. Amy finds a picture of herself with a baby in the little girl's room before she is kidnapped by the Silence. Canton wounds a Silent in the Doctor's prison and records it taunting him, "you should kill us all on sight." The Doctor tracks down Amy in the Silence's base and shows them the live broadcast of the Moon landing. He implants Canton's recording of the Silence into the footage, instructing all humans to attack the Silence. Later, Amy tells the Doctor that she was afraid travelling on the TARDIS would have an effect on the possible development of her child; Amy denies that she is actually pregnant but the Doctor initiates a scan. Six months later in New York City, the little girl is dying but reveals that she can regenerate.
215	3	"The Curse of the Black Spot"	Jeremy Webb	Stephen Thompson	7 May 2011	2.9	7.85	86
Following a distress signal, the TARDIS lands on a 17th-century pirate ship captained by Henry Avery, whose crew is terrorised by a Siren-like creature who marks crew members with black spots when they are injured and then seemingly disintegrates them. Rory receives a cut, and Amy and the Doctor keep him away from the Siren. Discovering that the Siren uses reflection as a portal, they rid the ship of any reflective surfaces. When Rory and Avery's son Toby are taken by the Siren, the Doctor, Amy, and Avery prick themselves and the Siren teleports them to an invisible alien spaceship which occupies the same spot as the pirate ship. There they find a sickbay where Rory and Toby are kept; Amy and the Doctor pull Rory off life support and Amy performs CPR to revive him.
216	4	"The Doctor's Wife"	Richard Clark	Neil Gaiman	14 May 2011	2.3	7.97	87
A distress signal from a Time Lord sends the Doctor, Amy and Rory outside the universe to a junkyard on an asteroid. They are introduced to the place's strange inhabitants — Auntie, Uncle, an Ood known as Nephew, and an excited woman named Idris, who seems attracted to the Doctor. An intelligence called "House" is controlling the asteroid. The Doctor discovers that other Time Lords have been lured to the asteroid and killed so House could feed off the energy. Upon learning that the Doctor is the last of the Time Lords, House takes possession of the TARDIS to escape to the regular universe, with Amy and Rory trapped inside. The Doctor learns that House has trapped the personality of the TARDIS inside Idris, causing her body to fail quickly. The two decide to build a makeshift TARDIS out of the scraps in the junkyard to pursue Amy, Rory and House. As they materialise inside the TARDIS, Idris releases the TARDIS's matrix, destroying House and liberating the TARDIS.
217a	5	"The Rebel Flesh"	Julian Simpson	Matthew Graham	21 May 2011	2.5	7.35	85
Caught in a "solar tsunami", the TARDIS crash-lands on a 22nd century monastery which has been turned into a factory for pumping the deadly acid off an island. The crew of the factory, headed by Miranda Cleaves, creates doppelgängers (called "Gangers") of themselves using a self-replicating fluid known as the Flesh, which they can safely operate through dangerous duties and are disposable. Cleaves refuses to heed the Doctor's warning about the solar storm until she receives official orders. The Doctor attempts to disconnect the solar connector, but an electrical strike knocks everyone unconscious and have caused the crew's Gangers to become sentient, and the Gangers are planning on killing the humans. As the Doctor herds the humans to a safe place in the monastery, Rory leaves to find Jennifer, whose estranged Ganger is hunting her. In the chapel, Amy and the Doctor discover a Flesh version of the Doctor.
217b	6	"The Almost People"	Julian Simpson	Matthew Graham	28 May 2011	2.6	6.72	86
Amy does not trust the Flesh version of the Doctor but accidentally tells it about his future death at Lake Silencio. Jennifer's Ganger, leading the war against the humans, kills her human counterpart and creates another Ganger, manipulating Rory into imprisoning the humans in an acid storage room. The Doctor's Ganger persuades the Gangers to liberate the humans, but they are pursued by Jennifer's Ganger, who has transformed herself into a monster. The Doctor reveals that Amy was actually distrusting the real version of him, and his Ganger and Cleaves' Ganger stay behind to destroy the monster. Amy begins experiencing contractions, and the Doctor explains she is going into labour and had been replaced by a Ganger which her real self is controlling. He disintegrates her Flesh form and she awakes in her real body fully pregnant in a white tube, watched over by the "Eye Patch Lady", who instructs her to "push".
218	7	"A Good Man Goes to War"	Peter Hoar	Steven Moffat	4 June 2011	2.7	7.51	88
The Doctor assembles an army and he and Rory infiltrate the asteroid base Demon's Run, where Amy is held captive and her newborn child, Melody Pond, has been taken by the Eye Patch Lady, Madame Kovarian. River Song refuses to join the Doctor, explaining that she cannot be there until the end, when he discovers her identity. The Doctor and Rory secure the base, free Amy, and take back Melody. The Doctor's allies discover that Melody contains both human and Time Lord DNA, a result of her being conceived on the TARDIS on Amy and Rory's wedding night. As Rory and the rest of the Doctor's allies battle the Headless Monks, the Doctor learns that he has been tricked: Melody has been replaced by a Ganger duplicate, and he is too late. River Song arrives, communicates her identity to the Doctor and he races off in the TARDIS, promising Amy and Rory that he will get their daughter back. River then informs the couple that she is in fact their daughter; "River Song" is a translation of "Melody Pond" in the language of the Gamma Forest.
Part 2
219	8	"Let's Kill Hitler"	Richard Senior	Steven Moffat	27 August 2011	2.8	8.10	85
Amy and Rory summon the Doctor to Leadworth, and he admits he has not found Melody. They are met by Mels, their childhood friend responsible for Amy and Rory's relationship and whom Amy named Melody after. Mels hijacks the TARDIS and causes it to spin out of control and crash into Hitler's office in 1938 Berlin. They accidentally save Hitler, as they disrupted a Teselecta, a shapeshifting robot piloted by miniaturised people to punish criminals, from killing him. Before Rory locks him away, Hitler shoots at the Teselecta but hits Mels instead. Instead of dying, however, Mels begins to regenerate into another incarnation which they recognise as River Song. She attempts to kill the Doctor several times before she kisses him; he discovers her lipstick was laced with poison that will kill him in 32 minutes. The Teselecta identifies River as responsible for the Doctor's death and thus a criminal, but Amy and Rory plead they not torture her and turn the Teselecta's security robots against the crew, who promptly teleport out. River saves the dying Doctor by giving up all her remaining regenerations.
220	9	"Night Terrors"	Richard Clark	Mark Gatiss	3 September 2011	2.4	7.07	86
The Doctor, Amy, and Rory make a "house call" to a boy named George who is terrified of almost everything, especially the wardrobe in his room. As the Doctor talks to his father Alex, Amy and Rory are transported from the lift to a life-size doll house where other members of the housing estate have arrived, to be turned into peg dolls. The Doctor investigates and Alex suddenly realises that his wife Claire was never pregnant. The Doctor asserts that George is an empathic alien who took on the form of Alex and Claire's desired child through a perception filter, and has the ability to lock away his fears within the wardrobe. George panics, causing the Doctor and Alex to be sucked into the doll's house. The Doctor realises that if George faces his fears by opening the wardrobe, the world in the dollhouse will be destroyed. George opens the wardrobe and is surrounded by dolls due to his belief that he is not wanted. Alex embraces George as a son, causing the dollhouse world to cease to exist and the inhabitants are returned to their world.
221	10	"The Girl Who Waited"	Nick Hurran	Tom MacRae	10 September 2011	2.10	7.60	85
The Doctor takes Amy and Rory to the planet Apalapucia, but they find that the planet is under quarantine as the two-hearted natives are susceptible to a deadly plague which will kill the infected within a day. Those infected by the plague are placed in an accelerated time stream, allowing them to live out their lives whilst in communication with their loved ones. Amy accidentally enters one of these rooms and is separated from the Doctor and Rory. The Doctor uses the TARDIS to locate her and Rory leaves to rescue her; the Doctor, who has two hearts, must remain on the TARDIS to avoid catching the plague. However, they have arrived 36 years later in Amy's time stream and the older Amy refuses to let them rescue her younger self. She later softens, however, and the Doctor says that both versions of Amy will be able to travel on the TARDIS. However, as both Amys are brought together and proceed to enter the TARDIS, the Doctor locks the older Amy out, explaining to Rory that the TARDIS would not allow this paradox.
222	11	"The God Complex"	Nick Hurran	Toby Whithouse	17 September 2011	2.11	6.77	86
The TARDIS lands in what appears to be a 1980s hotel, which the Doctor recognises as a disguised alien structure. The layout of the hotel is constantly shifting, and they soon lose the TARDIS. They meet others who had also suddenly found themselves in the hotel: humans Rita, Howie, Joe, and the alien Gibbis. One by one, Joe, Howie, and Rita are seemingly possessed by a minotaur-like monster and lured to it and subsequently killed. The Doctor surmises that the minotaur fed on a specific faith each of them had and discovers that Amy will be next, as she has faith in him. He convinces her to break her faith and the monster collapses and the hotel setting is revealed to be part of a simulation taking place on a prison ship. The Doctor takes Amy and Rory back to Earth, believing it is best for them to stop travelling with him before they are killed.
223	12	"Closing Time"	Steve Hughes	Gareth Roberts	24 September 2011	2.12	6.93	86
Nearly 200 years have passed for the Doctor, and as he nears his death at Lake Silencio he decides to visit his friend Craig Owens. Craig has moved in with his girlfriend Sophie and the two are raising their baby son, Alfie. The Doctor arrives just as Sophie has departed for a holiday and is compelled to stay and investigate strange electrical disturbances in the area. He traces this back to a department store, which the Doctor and Craig discover contains a teleporter to a Cyberman spacecraft as well as a Cybermat. The Doctor finds the ship underneath the building and is captured by the Cybermen; Craig follows and is nearly converted to a Cyberman, but he hears Alfie crying and recovers the strength to reverse the conversion. Elsewhere, Kovarian and the Silence strap River into the astronaut suit.
224	13	"The Wedding of River Song"	Jeremy Webb	Steven Moffat	1 October 2011	2.13	7.67	86
Understanding his death cannot be avoided, the Doctor gives invitations to Lake Silencio for Amy, Rory, River, and Canton to a Teselecta. However, the River in the astronaut suit refuses to kill him, causing the Earth to be thrown into a timeline where all of history is running at once. He is found by Amy who is able to remember the original universe due to the crack in her wall. The Doctor is taken to River, who is aware that if the two of them touch the correct time will resume. Amy realises who Rory is and kills Madame Kovarian for taking their child. The Doctor, believing the universe will collapse if they stay in the aborted timeline as River suggests, whispers something in River's ear and then marries her. They kiss, allowing the universe to return. Later, Amy and Rory are visited by River, who reveals that the Doctor had revealed to her that the Teselecta was impersonating him while he was safely inside it. Elsewhere, the Doctor is warned by Dorium that the question the Silence were attempting to prevent will be asked: "Doctor Who?"

=== Supplemental episodes ===
Two three-minute mini-episodes titled "Space" and "Time", directed by Richard Senior, were released on 18 March 2011, filmed under the sixth series' production cycle as part of BBC One's Red Nose Day telethon for the charity Comic Relief. The episodes form a two-part story, set entirely within the TARDIS, starring Matt Smith as the Doctor, Karen Gillan as Amy Pond and Arthur Darvill as Rory Williams, and were written by the programme's head writer Steven Moffat.

No.	Title	Directed by	Written by	Original release date
1	"Space" and "Time"	Richard Senior	Steven Moffat	18 March 2011
The episodes form a two-part story, set entirely within the TARDIS, starring Matt Smith as The Doctor, Karen Gillan as Amy Pond and Arthur Darvill as Rory Williams, and were written by the programme's head writer Steven Moffat. They received 10.26 million viewers.
2	"Death Is the Only Answer"	Jeremy Webb	Children of Oakley Junior School	1 October 2011
"Script to Screen" competition winning script, written by the pupils of Oakley CE Junior School.
3	Night and the Doctor	Richard Senior	Steven Moffat	21 November 2011 (home video release)
A series of five mini-episodes produced for the Series 6 DVD and Blu-Ray box set.

=== Prequels ===
A number of short prequel videos were released online prior to selected episodes' airings.

No.	Title	Directed by	Written by	Original release date
1	"The Impossible Astronaut" prequel	N/A	Steven Moffat	25 March 2011
Nixon receives a phone call from the little girl who keeps calling him in the episode. She begs for the President to look behind him, but he asks how she got that number, which the 'spaceman' told her. She tells him it is about monsters, to which he replies "Young lady, there are no monsters in the Oval Office." He then hangs up and leans back. Behind him stands an out-of-focus Silent.
2	"The Curse of the Black Spot" prequel	N/A	Stephen Thompson	30 April 2011
There is a short montage of atmospheric shots of the pirate ship, bridged by a narration in the form of Captain Avery's journal for "April the first, 1699; the good ship Fancy." Avery describes how his ship has been becalmed for eight days, and the crew are being taken one by one by "an enemy"; he fears that they are all doomed to die there.
3	"A Good Man Goes to War" prequel	Marcus Wilson	Steven Moffat	28 May 2011
Dorium talks to two Headless Monks. He gives them the brain of a Judoon, which contains a security protocol the monks need. Dorium tells them that he knows what they are up to, as he has heard rumours around the area. He asks them, "All this, to imprison one child? Oh, I know what you're up to, I hear everything in this place. I even hear rumours about whose child you've taken. Are you mad? You know the stories about the Doctor? The things that man has done? God help us if you make him angry!"
4	"Let's Kill Hitler" prequel	Steve Hughes	Steven Moffat	15 August 2011
Amy calls the Doctor and leaves a message for the Doctor on the TARDIS's answer phone, begging him to find her child, Melody. Though Amy knows Melody will grow up to be River Song, she does not want to miss seeing her grow up. As she ends her message, it is revealed that a very upset Doctor was listening but did not pick up the phone, even though Amy had pleaded for him to.
5	"The Wedding of River Song" prequel	Marcus Wilson	Steven Moffat	24 September 2011
At Area 52, which has a clock stuck at 5:02 p.m., Silence are kept in stasis and River Song is wearing an eye patch in the same fashion as Madame Kovarian.

== Casting ==
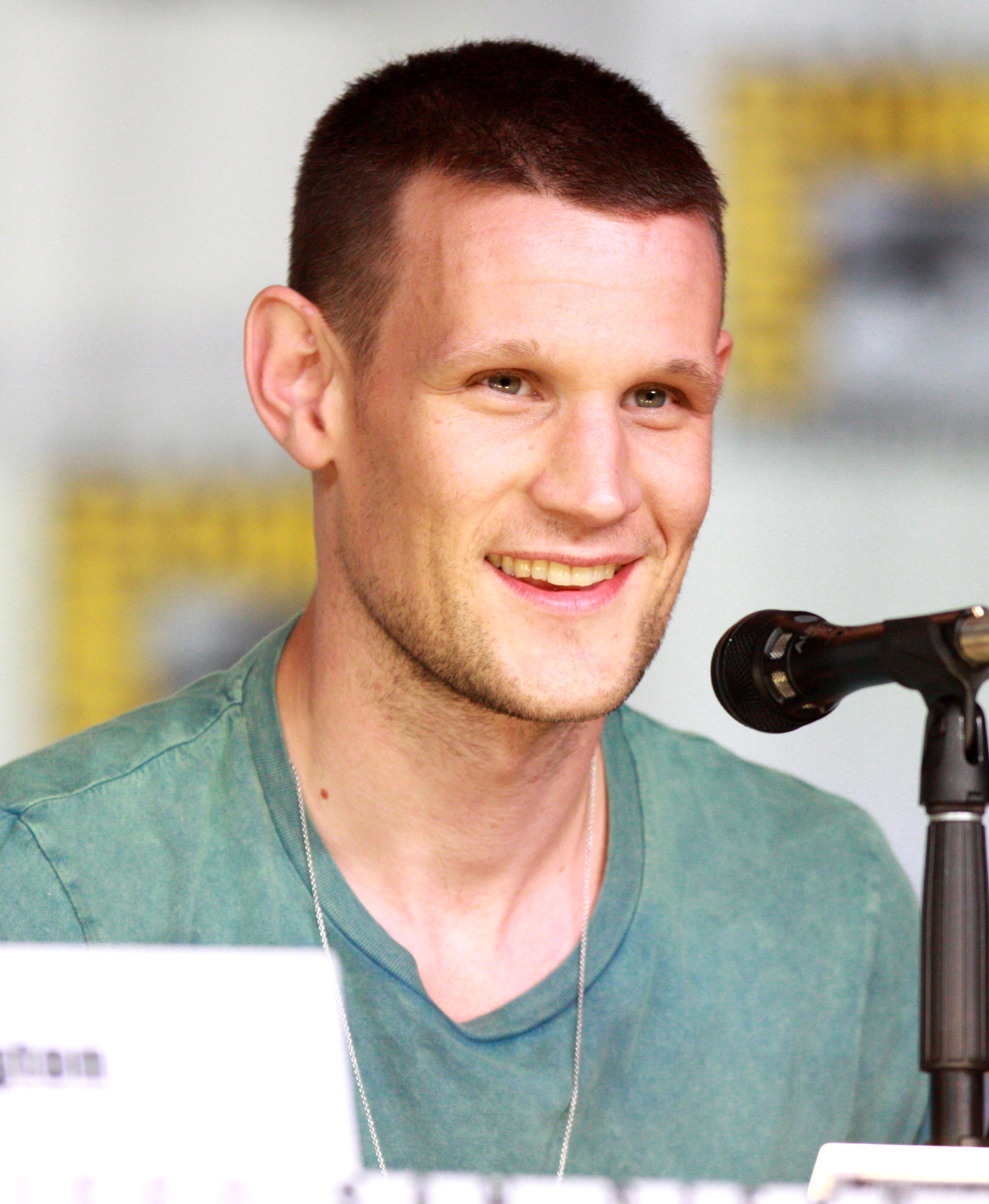
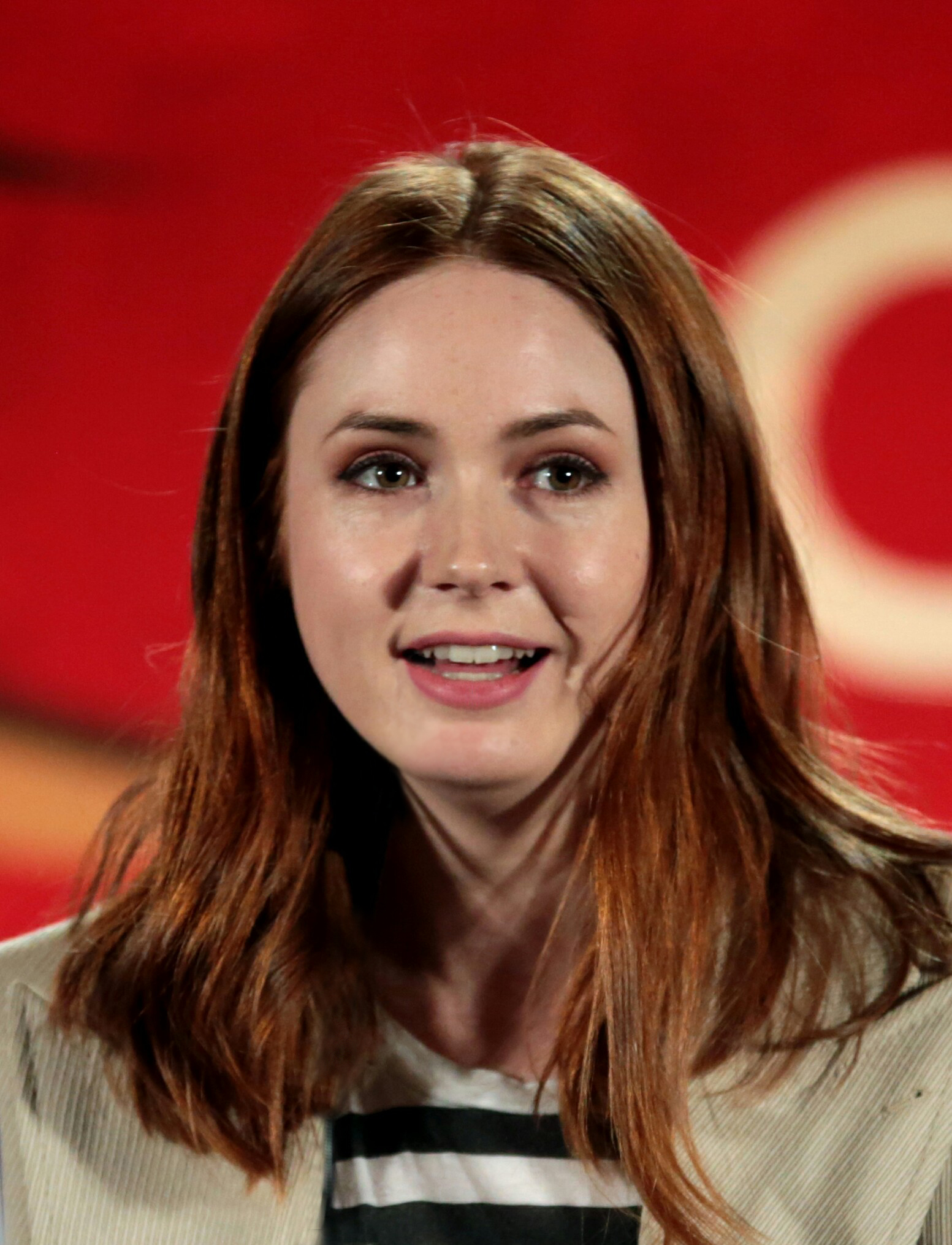
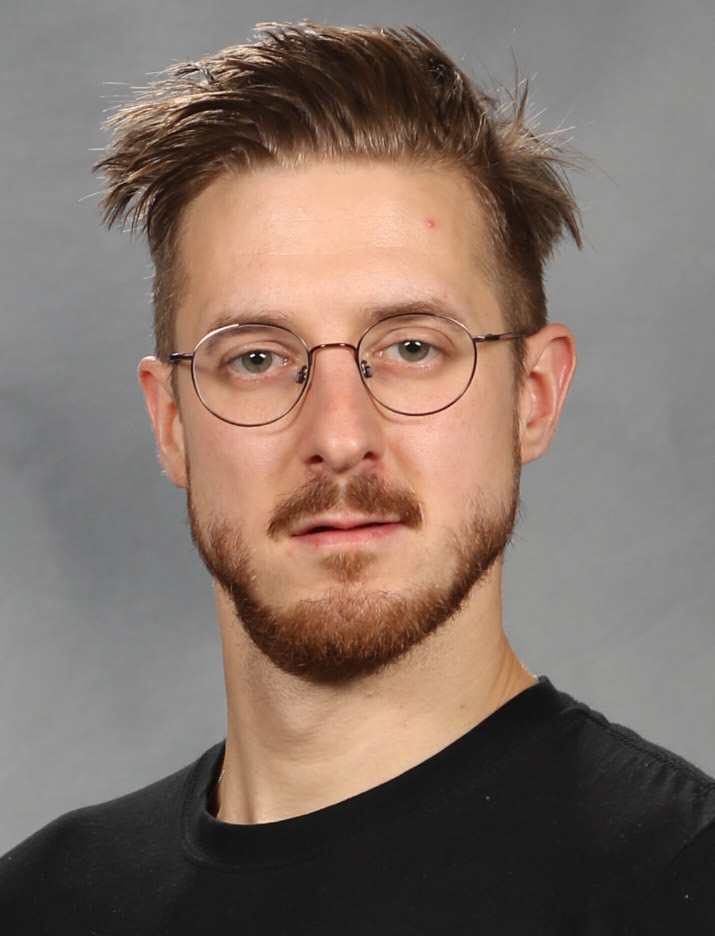
Matt Smith, Karen Gillan and Arthur Darvill return for the sixth series

Matt Smith, Karen Gillan and Arthur Darvill continued their roles as the Doctor, Amy Pond, and Rory Williams. Darvill had appeared in the previous series in a recurring role in seven episodes, acting as a companion in six of them, but became a regular in this series, having had his "fingers crossed" that this would happen.

Alex Kingston returned as River Song. Although Kingston did not expect to return before the fifth series, Moffat always intended for River to return to the series. James Corden also reprised his role as Craig Owens from "The Lodger" in "Closing Time", and Simon Callow briefly reprised his role as Charles Dickens from the first series episode "The Unquiet Dead", as did Ian McNeice who briefly reprised his role as Winston Churchill from the fifth series episode "Victory of the Daleks". A young version of Amy was played by Gillan's eleven-year-old cousin, Caitlin Blackwood, in the episodes "Let's Kill Hitler" and "The God Complex". Gillan and Blackwood first met on the set of the fifth series, but, although Blackwood had to audition, Gillan recommended her for the role.

"A Christmas Carol" guest-starred Michael Gambon and Katherine Jenkins as Kazran Sardick and Abigail respectively. Guest stars of the main series included Michael Sheen (voice) as "House" in "The Doctor's Wife", Imelda Staunton (voice) as "Interface" in "The Girl Who Waited", Suranne Jones as Idris in "The Doctor's Wife", David Walliams as Gibbis in "The God Complex", Hugh Bonneville and Lily Cole as Henry Avery and the "Siren" respectively in "The Curse of the Black Spot", Mark Sheppard as Canton in "The Impossible Astronaut" and "Day of the Moon", and Daniel Mays as Alex in "Night Terrors". Other guest stars included William Morgan Sheppard, Chukwudi Iwuji, Stuart Milligan, Kerry Shale, Lee Ross, Mark Bonnar, Sarah Smart, Marshall Lancaster, Raquel Cassidy, Christina Chong, Danny Sapani, Simon Fisher-Becker, Richard Dillane, Nina Toussaint-White, Amara Karan, Dimitri Leonidas, Sian Williams, Bill Turnbull, Meredith Vieira, and show writer Mark Gatiss.

== Production ==
=== Development ===
"[Series 5], in a way, was all about saying, don't worry, it's still him, it's still the same show, nothing's really been lost. Losing a leading man like David Tennant is seismic – unless you gain a leading man like Matt Smith. It's been the biggest joy to see him [play the Doctor]. But now he's really here, and the part is his, [...] he's ready to lead us places we didn't know existed. [In series 5] we reassured you – [in series 6], [...] we're going to worry the hell out of you. How well do we really know [the Doctor], or what he's capable of?"

— Steven Moffat

The sixth series was commissioned in March 2010, before the fifth series aired. Neither Peter Bennett nor Tracie Simpson returned as producers, with Sanne Wohlenberg covering the role for "A Christmas Carol" and the first two episodes filmed for the main series ("The Doctor's Wife" and "Night Terrors"). Marcus Wilson produced every other episode except "Closing Time", where Denise Paul produces and Wilson is credited as "series producer". Production designer Edward Thomas was replaced by Michael Pickwoad. Lead writer and executive producer Steven Moffat stated that the purpose of the previous series was to "reassure" the audience that the show was the same, despite the many production changes. However, he wanted this series to be more of a "ghost train" and "worry" the audience. The series is much more serialised than previous ones; the arc-driven nature was inspired by positive reactions from fans when the Doctor from the fifth series finale "The Big Bang" appeared in the earlier episode "Flesh and Stone". Moffat decided to "rest" the Doctor's arch-enemies the Daleks for the series, as being the "most frequent" enemies of the show made them "the most reliably defeatable enemies in the universe".

The series continues to build the mystery of the Silence, which had been introduced in the fifth series. Moffat did not wish to end the arc in the previous series, as he felt it would be "more fun" to continue it. Moffat had planned the revelation about River Song "for a long time"; when creating Amy's character, he chose "Pond" for her last name to create a link. Moffat intended for the "answer to be as complicated as the question". Moffat informed Kingston of the secrets of her character at the end of the previous series and she was not allowed to tell anyone; Smith, Gillan, and Darvill were unaware of the identity of her character. Song's identity was kept in top secrecy; the script read at the read-through of "A Good Man Goes to War" had a false ending, and only a select few were issued the real script.

=== Writing ===
Matthew Graham was not able to write an episode as he was slated to for the fifth series because he did not believe he would have enough time. Moffat then asked him to write the two-part episode "The Rebel Flesh"/"The Almost People". Neil Gaiman had written "The Doctor's Wife" for the previous series, but due to budget constraints it was replaced with "The Lodger". This necessitated changes to the script, including the addition of Rory as a companion. During the production process the order of the third, fourth and ninth episodes was changed. "The Curse of the Black Spot" was swapped with "Night Terrors" because Moffat felt that the second half of the series was too dark. This necessitated minor changes for the episodes to fit into the storyline, most notably in "Night Terrors".

Moffat wanted to start the series with a two-parter that had gravity and a wider scope in plot. He also aimed to make them some of the darkest episodes. In contrast, the following episode, "The Curse of the Black Spot", would allow the characters to "kick back and have some fun". Gaiman's episode was based around the TARDIS, and allowing the Doctor and the TARDIS to speak to each other. Graham's two-parter was intended to lead into "A Good Man Goes to War", the mid-series finale, but have a main plot about "avatars that rebel". Graham took Moffat's pitch and added many of his own aspects, such as the monastery setting and the Flesh. Then, in addition to revealing who River Song is, "A Good Man Goes to War" presented the situation of the Doctor, who was typically a pacifist, being provoked enough to assemble an army. Moffat described the ending as "game-changing cliffhanger" and split the series in two because such a climax could not be done at the end of a series, as it would be "too long before it came back".

The mid-series premiere, "Let's Kill Hitler", was intended to be the opposite of the "grim and dark" tone of the series premiere. Mark Gatiss wrote "Night Terrors" to be a scary episode, surprised that dolls had not been used in Doctor Who before. "The Girl Who Waited" is a "Doctor-lite" episode, an episode in which the actor playing the Doctor is not required for much of the shooting, which allowed Tom MacRae to explore Amy and Rory's characters and relationship. The concept of "The God Complex" was originally pitched by Toby Whithouse for the fifth series, but it was pushed back as Moffat felt that it was too similar to the stories in that series. The penultimate episode, "Closing Time", is a sequel to series five's "The Lodger" and allows the Doctor to have some fun while building up to the finale. Writer Gareth Roberts also wanted to bring back the Cybermen, as there were no other returning monsters in the series and he thought "there should be a sense of history about the Doctor's final battle to save Earth before he heads off to meet his death". The finale was described by Moffat as "a big roller coaster ride of Doctor Who madness" and concludes the Doctor's death arc, though it intentionally leaves some mysteries.

Steven Moffat asked former showrunner Russell T Davies to return to the programme after his initial departure and write an episode for the Eleventh Doctor and Amy Pond, which Davies ultimately pitched his idea as part of the sixth series in April 2010, but it was scrapped due to the budget constraints that the heavy visual effects would have required. When Davies later reassumed his old position as showrunner in 2023, he adapted this idea into the 2024 episode "Dot and Bubble" which starred the Fifteenth Doctor (Ncuti Gatwa) and Ruby Sunday (Millie Gibson).

=== Music ===
Murray Gold composed the soundtrack to this series, with orchestration by Ben Foster.

=== Filming ===
"Night Terrors" was the first episode of the series to be filmed in September 2010. It was mainly filmed on a council estate in Bristol, with some scenes filmed in Dyrham Park. Production of "The Doctor's Wife" also occurred in September, with some in October. The two-part opening story was partially filmed in the United States, a first for the programme. This production was done in Utah in November 2010. The story was co-produced by BBC America, who provided extra money for filming in the States. "The Rebel Flesh" and "The Almost People" was filmed in late November 2010 to January 2011, with much location shooting at Caerphilly Castle. "The Curse of the Black Spot" was filmed in Cornwall as well as the Upper Boat Studios, while some of "A Good Man Goes to War" was filmed in a hangar in Cardiff and began shooting mid-January 2011. "The God Complex" was mostly filmed on constructed hotel sets, and the low-budget "The Girl Who Waited" was intentionally set in "big white boxes". "Closing Time" was filmed at night in a department store, as well as a private home in Cardiff, with some filming reports in March 2011. "Let's Kill Hitler" featured Swansea and Cardiff's Temple of Peace as locations in Berlin. Filming concluded on 29 April 2011 with "The Wedding of River Song", though a scene from "Let's Kill Hitler" was delayed and filmed on 11 July 2011.

Production blocks were arranged as follows:

Block	Episode(s)	Director	Writer(s)	Producer	Code
X	Christmas special: "A Christmas Carol"	Toby Haynes	Steven Moffat	Sanne Wohlenberg	2X
1	Episode 9: "Night Terrors"	Richard Clark	Mark Gatiss	Sanne Wohlenberg	2.4
1	Episode 4: "The Doctor's Wife"	Richard Clark	Neil Gaiman	Sanne Wohlenberg	2.3
2	Episode 1: "The Impossible Astronaut"	Toby Haynes	Steven Moffat	Marcus Wilson	2.1
2	Episode 2: "Day of the Moon"	Toby Haynes	Steven Moffat	Marcus Wilson	2.2
3	Episode 5: "The Rebel Flesh"	Julian Simpson	Matthew Graham	Marcus Wilson	2.5
3	Episode 6: "The Almost People"	Julian Simpson	Matthew Graham	Marcus Wilson	2.6
4	Episode 7: "A Good Man Goes to War"	Peter Hoar	Steven Moffat	Marcus Wilson	2.7
4	Episode 3: "The Curse of the Black Spot"	Jeremy Webb	Stephen Thompson	Marcus Wilson	2.9
5	Episode 11: "The God Complex"	Nick Hurran	Toby Whithouse	Marcus Wilson	2.11
5	Episode 10: "The Girl Who Waited"	Nick Hurran	Tom MacRae	Marcus Wilson	2.10
6	Episode 12: "Closing Time"	Steve Hughes	Gareth Roberts	Denise Paul	2.12
7	Episode 13: "The Wedding of River Song"	Jeremy Webb	Steven Moffat	Marcus Wilson	2.13
7	Episode 8: "Let's Kill Hitler"	Richard Senior	Steven Moffat	Marcus Wilson	2.8

== Release ==
=== Promotion ===
The first trailer for the sixth series was shown directly after "A Christmas Carol". In December 2010, BBC America began airing promotions for the new series with Smith and Gillan in character, announcing that they have landed in America. A 15-second teaser trailer was shown on BBC One at 9pm, 22 March 2011. This was followed by a one-minute trailer on 30 March 2011. BBC America followed with a one-minute trailer on 1 April. In addition, two radio trailers were broadcast in the UK in April.

On 10 June 2011, the BBC released a short 30-second teaser trailer for the second half of the series. Smith and Gillan, alongside executive producers Piers Wenger and Beth Willis and "The God Complex" writer Toby Whithouse, attended the 2011 San Diego Comic-Con in late June to promote the second half of the series. There a one-minute trailer and a clip of "The God Complex" was shown. A 40-second trailer was released on 4 August 2011 for BBC One. A 30-second trailer from BBC America was released on 12 August 2011. An alternative trailer aired on CBBC in August 2011.

In addition, the BBC released prequels on the Doctor Who official website to promote some of the episodes. The first, for "The Impossible Astronaut", was released on 25 March 2011. Prequels were subsequently released to promote "The Curse of the Black Spot", "A Good Man Goes to War", "Let's Kill Hitler", and "The Wedding of River Song".

=== Broadcast ===
The series was split into two halves, primarily for storytelling reasons, with the first seven episodes airing in early 2011 and the final six airing later in the year. The first half aired in the United Kingdom on BBC One from 23 April 2011, and the second half from 27 August.

In the United States, the sixth series began airing on BBC America on 23 April; following "A Christmas Carol", this was the first full series to air on the same day in the US as the UK. However, "The Almost People" and "A Good Man Goes to War" were delayed by one week due to expected low numbers of TV viewers during the Memorial Day weekend. Space aired the premiere on 23 April for Canadian viewers, and "The Impossible Astronaut" was broadcast in Australia on ABC1 on 30 April. The series started screening in New Zealand on Prime on 19 May 2011. The second half of the series, beginning with "Let's Kill Hitler", was broadcast on 27 August 2011 on BBC America and on Space. ABC1 began the second run on 3 September.

Some international broadcasts, including BBC America, contained a special introductory narration by Amy explaining the concept of the series before the opening credits. Moffat was asked to write the sequence; he called it a "bloody good idea" because it would make it accessible to new audiences, despite noting that diehard fans would not like it. Previous showrunner Russell T Davies was also a fan of the sequence.

=== Home media ===
All of the episodes from the first half of the series ("The Impossible Astronaut" to "A Good Man Goes to War") were released on 11 July 2011 on DVD and Blu-ray, entitled Doctor Who: Series Six, Part 1. This set included two featurettes called "Monster Files", which looked into the Silence and the Gangers. Doctor Who: Series Six, Part 2, covering episodes from "Let's Kill Hitler" to "The Wedding of River Song", was released on DVD and Blu-ray on 10 October 2011. It also contained two "Monster Files" on the Antibodies and the Cybermats. A 6-disc boxset containing all 13 episodes of the series and "A Christmas Carol" was released on 21 November 2011 in Region 2, 22 November in Region 1, on 1 December 2011 in Region 4. A limited edition box set was also released in the UK with a lifted image of a Silent on the cover and including five 3D art cards. Special features included in the box sets are commentaries on five episodes, "Space" and "Time", the prequels, trailers, "Monster Files", and the cut-down versions of the accompanying Doctor Who Confidential episodes. Also included is Night and the Doctor, which comprises five made-for-DVD mini-episodes.

- ^{(D)} indicates a DVD release for a specific date
- ^{(B)} indicates a Blu-ray release
- ^{(D,B)} indicates a simultaneous DVD and Blu-ray release

Series	Story no.	Episode name	Duration	Release date		
Series	Story no.	Episode name	Duration	R2	R4	R1
6	213	Doctor Who: A Christmas Carol "A Christmas Carol" & Doctor Who Prom (2010)	1 × 60 min.	24 January 2011^{(D,B)}	3 March 2011^{(D,B)}	15 February 2011^{(D,B)}
6	214–218	Doctor Who: Series 6, Part 1 "The Impossible Astronaut" – "A Good Man Goes to War"	6 × 45 min. 1 × 50 min.	11 July 2011^{(D,B)}	4 August 2011^{(D,B)}	19 July 2011^{(D,B)}
6	219–224	Doctor Who: Series 6, Part 2 "Let's Kill Hitler" – "The Wedding of River Song"	4 × 45 min. 2 × 50 min.	10 October 2011^{(D,B)}	3 November 2011^{(D,B)}	8 November 2011^{(D,B)}
6	213–224	Doctor Who: The Complete Sixth Series (includes "A Christmas Carol")	1 × 60 min. 3 × 50 min. 10 × 45 min.	21 November 2011^{(D,B)}	1 December 2011^{(D,B)}	22 November 2011^{(D,B)}
5, 6, 7, 2013 specials	203–241	Doctor Who: The Complete Matt Smith Years	30 × 45 min. 7 × 50 min. 1 × 55 min. 4 × 60 min. 1 × 65 min. 1 × 77 min.	—N/a	—N/a	4 November 2014^{(B)} 2 October 2018^{(D)}

== Reception ==
=== Ratings ===
"A Christmas Carol" received final ratings of 12.11 million UK viewers, the fourth highest rated Christmas special behind "Voyage of the Damned", "The Next Doctor", and Part Two of "The End of Time". The ratings for the series dramatically increased once time-shifted viewers were taken into account. "The Impossible Astronaut" premiered with a consolidated figure of 8.86 million viewers in the UK, and was reportedly the most recorded television event of all time. It also received 1.379 million requests on BBC's online iPlayer for the month of April. The series held a consistent viewership in the seven millions, with the lowest-rated episode being "The Almost People" with 6.72 million.

The series also received a strong Appreciation Index, with all episodes aside from "A Christmas Carol" in the "excellent" category of a score of 85 or more. While "The Impossible Astronaut" and "A Good Man Goes to War" reached 88, the finale only scored 86, compared to 88, 89, and 91 of the previous finales of the revived series.

In Canada on Space, "The Impossible Astronaut" was viewed by 538,000, the most-watched Doctor Who episode for the channel and its most-watched telecast thus far in 2011. On BBC America in the United States, "The Impossible Astronaut" was the channel's highest-rated telecast with 1.3 million viewers, increasing to 1.8 million when DVR recordings were taken into account. The second half of the series, with Top Gear and Luther, contributed to the third quarter of 2011 being BBC America's highest rated. Doctor Who also became the most-downloaded show of 2011 on iTunes in the US, with the sixth series specifically topping the chart.

No.	Title	Air date	Overnight ratings		Consolidated ratings		Total viewers (millions)	AI	Ref(s)
No.	Title	Air date	Viewers (millions)	Rank	Viewers (millions)	Rank	Total viewers (millions)	AI	Ref(s)
–	"A Christmas Carol"	25 December 2010	10.30	4	1.81	3	12.11	83	
1	"The Impossible Astronaut"	23 April 2011	6.50	1	2.36	3	8.86	88	
2	"Day of the Moon"	30 April 2011	5.40	2	1.9	7	7.30	87	
3	"The Curse of the Black Spot"	7 May 2011	6.20	2	1.65	5	7.85	86	
4	"The Doctor's Wife"	14 May 2011	5.90	3	2.07	8	7.97	87	
5	"The Rebel Flesh"	21 May 2011	5.70	2	1.65	6	7.35	85	
6	"The Almost People"	28 May 2011	5.00	2	1.72	6	6.72	86	
7	"A Good Man Goes to War"	4 June 2011	5.50	6	2.01	2	7.51	88	
8	"Let's Kill Hitler"	27 August 2011	6.20	1	1.9	6	8.10	85	
9	"Night Terrors"	3 September 2011	5.50	4	1.57	7	7.07	86	
10	"The Girl Who Waited"	10 September 2011	6.00	3	1.6	6	7.60	85	
11	"The God Complex"	17 September 2011	5.20	3	1.57	5	6.77	86	
12	"Closing Time"	24 September 2011	5.30	3	1.63	5	6.93	86	
13	"The Wedding of River Song"	1 October 2011	6.10	2	1.57	7	7.67	86	

=== Critical reception ===
The review aggregation website Rotten Tomatoes gives the series a score of 100 per cent, with a weighted average of 9.04 out of 10.

Reviewing the first half, Dave Golder of SFX praised the change in direction Moffat had taken with the show, calling it "more visually impressive and more narratively rewarding than anything we've had before". The Guardian's Dan Martin was positive towards the first six episodes, despite calling "The Curse of the Black Spot" a "wasted opportunity" and noting that it would be a risk to serialise the story too much. He particularly praised the way Amy, Rory, and the Doctor had developed since the last series.

Sam McPherson of Zap2it said that, despite a few "duds", the sixth series was the "strongest" since Doctor Who's revival in 2005. Despite disliking the finale as a conclusion, The Independent's Neela Debnath praised the character development seen in the series as well as the "cinematic quality". She also was positive to the dynamic between the Doctor, Amy, and Rory, as it was different from other characters seen previously on the show, and continuing with the same character allowed the series to feel more "multi-layered". Charlie Jane Anders of io9 described it as "of the most unusual, and structurally ambitious, eras in Doctor Who's history" and praised the way the story revolved around the Doctor. Anders commented in a review of the DVD release that the "inventiveness and cleverness" was an integral part of the sixth series, and the episodes such as "The Doctor's Wife" and "The God Complex" would be considered classics. She praised Moffat's writing, while commenting on the fact that the series' primary storylines, including Amy's pregnancy, River Song's childhood and assassination plot on the Doctor were not satisfying enough when re-watching the series. Anders did not consider Amy and River particularly "plausible characters". DVD Talk's John Sinnott gave the series four out of five stars, feeling that it "[didn't] quite hit the heights" of the fifth series but was "still pretty good (and light years past any other SF show currently in production)". Despite finding the solution "witty, unpredictable ... and very satisfying", he stated that the subplots were "a bit convoluted" and potentially confusing, and they "seem to drop the mystery of the person in the space suit for a large part of the season and [focus] on other odd events". He also noted that the plots of the consecutive episodes "Night Terrors", "The Girl Who Waited", and "The God Complex" were similar.

Reviewing the whole series, SFX's Ian Berriman was more critical, giving it three and a half out of five stars. He criticised the story arc, finding it too complicated and the solution unsatisfying, and noted that it lacked "emotional impact". Anders felt that the story arc, especially the finale, suffered from Amy and River not being portrayed as believable characters. Digital Spy named Doctor Who the eighth best show of 2011, feeling that the series was "something of a mixed bag" with episodes of varying quality but generally praised the acting of the cast: "Matt Smith was firing on all cylinders – there's a confidence that comes with knowing you're a hit with viewers – while Arthur Darvill's Rory excelled in his first year as a series regular". Gavin Fuller of The Daily Telegraph wrote that "The Wedding of River Song" was "an uneven ending to a slightly uneven series which at times has been in danger of overcomplicating itself, but still has been one of the most creative and distinctive series on television". The series was also criticised by viewers and the press for being "too scary" for young children, "too complicated", and running the risk of alienating casual viewers. Arnold T. Blumburg of IGN stated that the sixth series "inspired seriously divided reactions in fandom" and, in his opinion, "the show has never been more unevenly written or emotionally distant".

=== Awards and nominations ===
Year	Award	Category	Nominee(s)	Result	Ref(s)
2011	Constellation Awards	Best Female Performance in a 2011 Science Fiction Television Episode	"The Girl Who Waited"	Nominated	
2011	Constellation Awards	Best Science Fiction Television Series of 2011	Doctor Who	Nominated	
2011	Hugo Awards	Hugo Award for Best Dramatic Presentation (Short Form)	"A Christmas Carol"	Nominated	
2011	Nebula Awards	Ray Bradbury	"The Doctor's Wife"	Won	
2011	Royal Television Society Programme Awards	Best Writer (Drama)	Steven Moffat	Nominated	
2012	BAFTA Cymru	Best Sound	Sound Team for "The Wedding of River Song"	Nominated	
2012	BAFTA Cymru	Best Television Drama	"The Impossible Astronaut"	Nominated	
2012	BAFTA Cymru	Best Digital Creativity & Games	Doctor Who: The Adventure Games: "The Gunpowder Plot"	Won	
2012	Hugo Awards	Hugo Award for Best Dramatic Presentation (Short Form)	"The Doctor's Wife"	Won	
2012	Hugo Awards	Hugo Award for Best Dramatic Presentation (Short Form)	"A Good Man Goes to War"	Nominated	
2012	Hugo Awards	Hugo Award for Best Dramatic Presentation (Short Form)	"The Girl Who Waited"	Nominated	
2012	Saturn Award	Best Youth-Oriented Series on Television	Doctor Who	Nominated	
2012	TV Choice Awards	Best Family Drama	Doctor Who	Won	
2012	TV Choice Awards	Best Actor	Matt Smith	Nominated	
2012	TV Choice Awards	Best Actress	Karen Gillan	Nominated	

== Soundtrack ==
Selected pieces of score from this series (from "The Impossible Astronaut" to "The Wedding of River Song"), as composed by Murray Gold, was released on 19 December 2011 by Silva Screen Records. The music from "A Christmas Carol" was released separately on its own soundtrack.

Doctor Who: Series 6

Soundtrack album by Murray Gold, Ben Foster and the BBC National Orchestra of Wales
- Released: 19 December 2011
- Recorded: 2010–2011
- Genre: Soundtrack
- Length: 141:34
- Label: Silva Screen Records
- Producer: Murray Gold

Doctor Who soundtrack chronology
A Christmas Carol (2011)	Series 6 (2011)	The Caves of Androzani (2013)

Disc 1
No.	Title	Episode	Length
1.	"I Am the Doctor in Utah"	"The Impossible Astronaut" / "Day of the Moon"	1:44
2.	"1969"	"The Impossible Astronaut" / "Day of the Moon"	2:01
3.	"The Impossible Astronaut"	"The Impossible Astronaut" / "Day of the Moon"	3:13
4.	"Trust Me"	"The Impossible Astronaut" / "Day of the Moon"	1:39
5.	"Help Is On Its Way"	"The Impossible Astronaut" / "Day of the Moon"	3:59
6.	"Another Perfect Prison"	"The Impossible Astronaut" / "Day of the Moon"	0:53
7.	"Greystark Hall"	"The Impossible Astronaut" / "Day of the Moon"	2:53
8.	"Apollo 11"	"The Impossible Astronaut" / "Day of the Moon"	0:54
9.	"Day of the Moon"	"The Impossible Astronaut" / "Day of the Moon"	2:43
10.	"I See You Silence"	"The Impossible Astronaut" / "Day of the Moon"	1:05
11.	"You're a Dead Man"	"The Curse of the Black Spot"	1:40
12.	"Deadly Siren"	"The Curse of the Black Spot"	5:30
13.	"Perfect Reflection"	"The Curse of the Black Spot"	1:03
14.	"All for One"	"The Curse of the Black Spot"	3:48
15.	"The Curse of the Black Spot"	"The Curse of the Black Spot"	1:14
16.	"I've Got Mail"	"The Doctor's Wife"	0:45
17.	"My TARDIS"	"The Doctor's Wife"	1:29
18.	"Run, Sexy"	"The Doctor's Wife"	1:57
19.	"Locked On"	"The Doctor's Wife"	1:07
20.	"The Chemical Castle"	"The Rebel Flesh" / "The Almost People"	1:30
21.	"Which One Is the Flesh?"	"The Rebel Flesh" / "The Almost People"	1:39
22.	"Scanning Me"	"The Rebel Flesh" / "The Almost People"	2:30
23.	"Ransacked"	"The Rebel Flesh" / "The Almost People"	2:01
24.	"Always with the Rory"	"The Rebel Flesh" / "The Almost People"	1:22
25.	"Double Doctor"	"The Rebel Flesh" / "The Almost People"	2:02
26.	"Tell Me the Truth"	"The Rebel Flesh" / "The Almost People"	3:48
27.	"Loving Isn't Knowing (The Almost People Suite)"	"The Rebel Flesh" / "The Almost People"	5:29
28.	"River's Waltz"	"A Good Man Goes To War"	1:50
29.	"Pop"	"A Good Man Goes To War"	1:36
30.	"Tell Me Who You Are"	"A Good Man Goes To War"	1:52
31.	"Melody Pond"	"A Good Man Goes To War"	2:36
Total length:			67:52

Disc 2
No.	Title	Episode	Length
1.	"Growing Up Fast"	"Let's Kill Hitler"	1:21
2.	"The Blush of Love"	"Let's Kill Hitler"	1:22
3.	"Terror of the Reich"	"Let's Kill Hitler"	3:05
4.	"The British Are Coming"	"Let's Kill Hitler"	1:07
5.	"A Very Unusual Melody"	"Let's Kill Hitler"	2:52
6.	"When a River Forms"	"Let's Kill Hitler"	1:32
7.	"Pay Attention, Grown Ups"	"Let's Kill Hitler"	2:10
8.	"The Enigma of River Song"	"Let's Kill Hitler"	3:58
9.	"Bedtime for George"	"Night Terrors"	2:24
10.	"Tick Tock Round the Clock"	"Night Terrors"	2:11
11.	"A Malevolent Estate"	"Night Terrors"	3:56
12.	"Night Terrors"	"Night Terrors"	1:19
13.	"Apalapucia"	"The Girl Who Waited"	1:29
14.	"36 Years"	"The Girl Who Waited"	0:55
15.	"Lost in the Wrong Stream"	"The Girl Who Waited"	3:25
16.	"The Hotel Prison"	"The God Complex"	0:47
17.	"Room of Your Dreams"	"The God Complex"	1:21
18.	"Fear Enough"	"The God Complex"	1:17
19.	"What's Left to Be Scared of?"	"The God Complex"	1:00
20.	"Rita Praises"	"The God Complex"	1:07
21.	"Stormageddon, Dark Lord of All"	"Closing Time"	1:33
22.	"Definitely Going"	"Closing Time"	1:56
23.	"Over Your Shoulder"	"Closing Time"	1:11
24.	"Ladieswear"	"Closing Time"	0:45
25.	"Fragrance"	"Closing Time"	2:17
26.	"My Time Is Running Out"	"Closing Time"	4:55
27.	"Tick Tock (Vocal Track)"	"The Wedding of River Song"	1:23
28.	"5:02 PM"	"The Wedding of River Song"	2:43
29.	"The Head Of An Enemy"	"The Wedding of River Song"	1:15
30.	"My Silence"	"The Wedding of River Song"	1:12
31.	"Brigadier Lethbridge-Stewart"	"The Wedding of River Song"	2:19
32.	"Forgiven"	"The Wedding of River Song"	2:31
33.	"Time Is Moving"	"The Wedding of River Song"	1:31
34.	"The Wedding of River Song"	"The Wedding of River Song"	5:32
35.	"The Majestic Tale (of a Madman in a Box)"	"Day of the Moon"	4:01
Total length:			73:42
