= Night Terrors (Doctor Who) =

220 – "Night Terrors"
- Doctor Who episode

Cast
- Doctor: Matt Smith – Eleventh Doctor
- Companions: Karen Gillan – Amy Pond; Arthur Darvill – Rory Williams
- Others: Daniel Mays – Alex; Jamie Oram – George; Emma Cunniffe – Claire; Andrew Tiernan – Purcell; Leila Hoffman – Mrs Rossiter; Sophie Cosson – Julie

Production
- Directed by: Richard Clark
- Written by: Mark Gatiss
- Produced by: Sanne Wohlenberg
- Executive producers: Steven Moffat; Piers Wenger; Beth Willis
- Music by: Murray Gold
- Production code: 2.4
- Series: Series 6
- Running time: 45 minutes
- First broadcast: 3 September 2011

Chronology
| ← Preceded by "Let's Kill Hitler" | Followed by → "The Girl Who Waited" |

"Night Terrors" is the ninth episode of the sixth series of the British science fiction television series Doctor Who, and was first broadcast on BBC One and BBC America on 3 September 2011. It was written by Mark Gatiss and directed by Richard Clark.

In the episode, alien time traveller the Doctor (in his eleventh incarnation played by Matt Smith) and his companions Amy Pond (Karen Gillan) and Rory (Arthur Darvill) decide to make a "house call" to Croydon, to an eight-year-old boy named George (Jamie Oram) who is terrified of almost everything and especially dreads the cupboard in his bedroom. While the Doctor discusses this with George's father Alex (Daniel Mays), Amy and Rory become trapped in a doll house with terrifying life-size peg dolls.

"Night Terrors" was inspired by Gatiss's fear of dolls, and the ones in the episode were designed to be scary and crude-looking. The episode was moved from the first half of the series to the second, which necessitated changes to make it fit into the series' story arc. It was the first to be filmed, with production taking place in September 2010 at a council estate in Redcliffe, Bristol and at Dyrham Park, where the doll's house interior scenes were filmed. The episode was watched by 7.07 million viewers in the UK and received mixed reviews from critics; it received praise for its tone and visual aspects, but some criticism due to the episode's lack of input into the overarching series narrative as it came after a heavy story-arc episode.

== Plot ==
=== Synopsis ===
The Eleventh Doctor decides to make a "house call" after his psychic paper receives a message from George, a frightened 8-year-old child, asking his help in getting rid of the monsters in his bedroom. On arrival at a council estate on present-day Earth, the Doctor, Amy and Rory split up to locate the child. The Doctor, taking the guise of a social services worker, finds the right flat, and meets George's father, Alex, while his mother Claire is working a night shift. Through Alex's photo album, the Doctor learns that George has been frightened all his life, fearing many of the sounds and people around the flat and is helped to cope by various habits, including metaphorically placing his fears in his wardrobe.

Meanwhile, Amy and Rory, while taking the lift down, suddenly find themselves in what appears to be an eighteenth-century house, but shortly discover most of the furnishings are wooden props. Other residents of the estate appear in the house but are caught by life-sized peg dolls which transform the residents into more dolls. Amy is caught and becomes a peg doll herself, joining the others in chasing Rory.

The Doctor, suspecting that the wardrobe contains the evil George fears, opens it to find its contents are simply clothes and toys, including a doll house. The Doctor recalls from Alex's photo album that Claire did not appear pregnant in the weeks leading up to George's supposed birth, causing Alex to remember the fact that Claire was unable to have children. The Doctor asserts that George is a Tenza child, an empathic alien who took on the form of Alex and Claire's desired child through a perception filter, and has the ability to literally lock away his fears in the wardrobe. The Doctor and Alex are pulled into the wardrobe, joining Rory in the dollhouse. As the peg dolls descend on the three, the Doctor calls out to George to face his fears; George is able to open the wardrobe and appears in the dollhouse, but the dolls turn to advance on him. The Doctor realises that George is still frightened that Alex and Claire plan to send him away, having mistakenly interpreted a conversation they had earlier that night; Alex rushes through the peg dolls to embrace George as his son. They all soon find themselves back at the estate, restored to normal.

The Doctor says goodbye to Alex and reassures him that George would be whatever he wants him to be, since George, being a Tenza, can adapt to his surroundings perfectly, although he promises to come back when George enters puberty, since it's "always a funny time".

=== Continuity ===
The Doctor refers to "Snow White and the Seven Keys to Doomsday", "The Three Little Sontarans" and "The Emperor Dalek's New Clothes" as being among his childhood nursery stories, referencing the 1974 stage play 'Seven Keys to Doomsday and the Sontarans and the Emperor Dalek, two of the series' recurring monsters. He also repeats his predilection for tea and Jammie Dodgers from another Gatiss-written episode, "Victory of the Daleks".

== Production ==
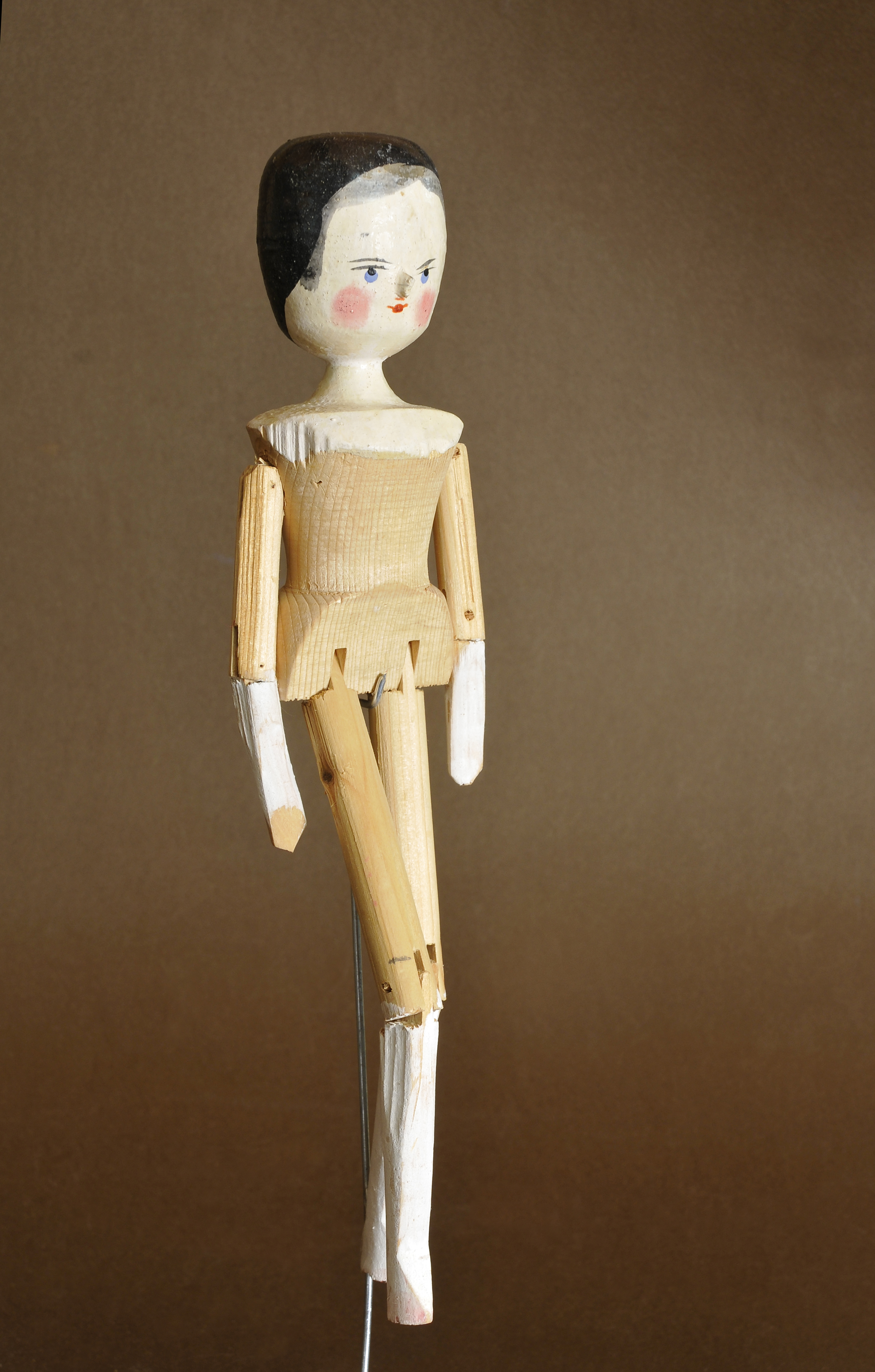
The life-size dolls in "Night Terrors" are based on the peg dolls of Germany and the Netherlands.

Episode writer Mark Gatiss told Radio Times that he had always been scared of dolls, and was surprised that Doctor Who had never used them before. He was especially interested in peg dolls, which he said were "the stuff of proper nightmares". Gatiss had previously worked with guest actor Daniel Mays in the BBC serial Funland and purposely inserted the line "Maybe later" into the script as it had been "a bit of a catchphrase" for the two on Funland. However, Mays did not notice the reference. The episode was originally given the title of "What Are Little Boys Made Of?"

To achieve a greater variety of stories in the first half of series 6 "Night Terrors" was moved to the second block of episodes, having been filmed as episode four and showing up in promos for the first half of the season. This necessitated minor changes to the episode, including the removal of a recurring sequence featuring the appearance of Madame Kovarian. The original last scene was dropped, and a new one was written so it would make sense at that point in the series. This scene consisted of nursery rhyme; lead writer Steven Moffat wanted to foreshadow the Doctor's death and asked Gatiss to write a nursery rhyme, which he described as "rather wonderful". Variations of the rhyme are heard in "Closing Time" and the series finale "The Wedding of River Song".

The episode was the first to be filmed, in September 2010. It was mainly filmed on a council estate in Bath, Somerset, while the scenes in the dollhouse were filmed in Dyrham Park. The Bristol estate was chosen because of its "crisp architecture". The country house of Dyrham Park was chosen because of its staircase and checked flooring. The antiques were stripped out of the building and replaced with "child-like" furniture that was placed to look as though it had been played with. Several designs of the dolls were made, trying to achieve the desired balance of a normal doll and a scarier, more "crude"-looking one. The actors portraying the dolls were choreographed to move with stiff legs but swing their arms. In the scene in which Alex and the Doctor are in the kitchen, they open and close the fridge as they are talking; this was not in the script, but improvised by Mays and Matt Smith on set. Mays was invited to guest-star in the episode, and was drawn to the story because of the family element; he had a young son like George. The scene in which Purcell sinks into the carpet was filmed with actor Andrew Tiernan on a hydraulic platform that lowered him into green-coloured liquid.

== Broadcast and reception ==
"Night Terrors" was first broadcast in the United Kingdom on BBC One on 3 September 2011. The episode achieved an overnight figure of 5.5 million viewers, making it the fourth most-watched programme for the day. Final consolidated figures showed it picked up 1.6 million timeshifted viewers, bringing the total up to 7.07 million viewers. It received an Appreciation Index of 86, considered "excellent".

=== Critical reception ===
Reception to the episode has been generally mixed. Dan Martin of The Guardian commented that the episode was an improvement on Gatiss's previous three episodes – "The Unquiet Dead", "The Idiot's Lantern" and "Victory of the Daleks". He complimented it overall as "a classy, creepy episode of retro Doctor Who" in comparison to "Let's Kill Hitler", though he saw its plot as over-similar to "The Empty Child" and other episodes written by Steven Moffat. Martin later rated it the tenth best episode of the series, though the finale was not included in the list. Gavin Fuller of The Daily Telegraph praised the dolls for "stealing the show", as well as the concept of the doll's house.

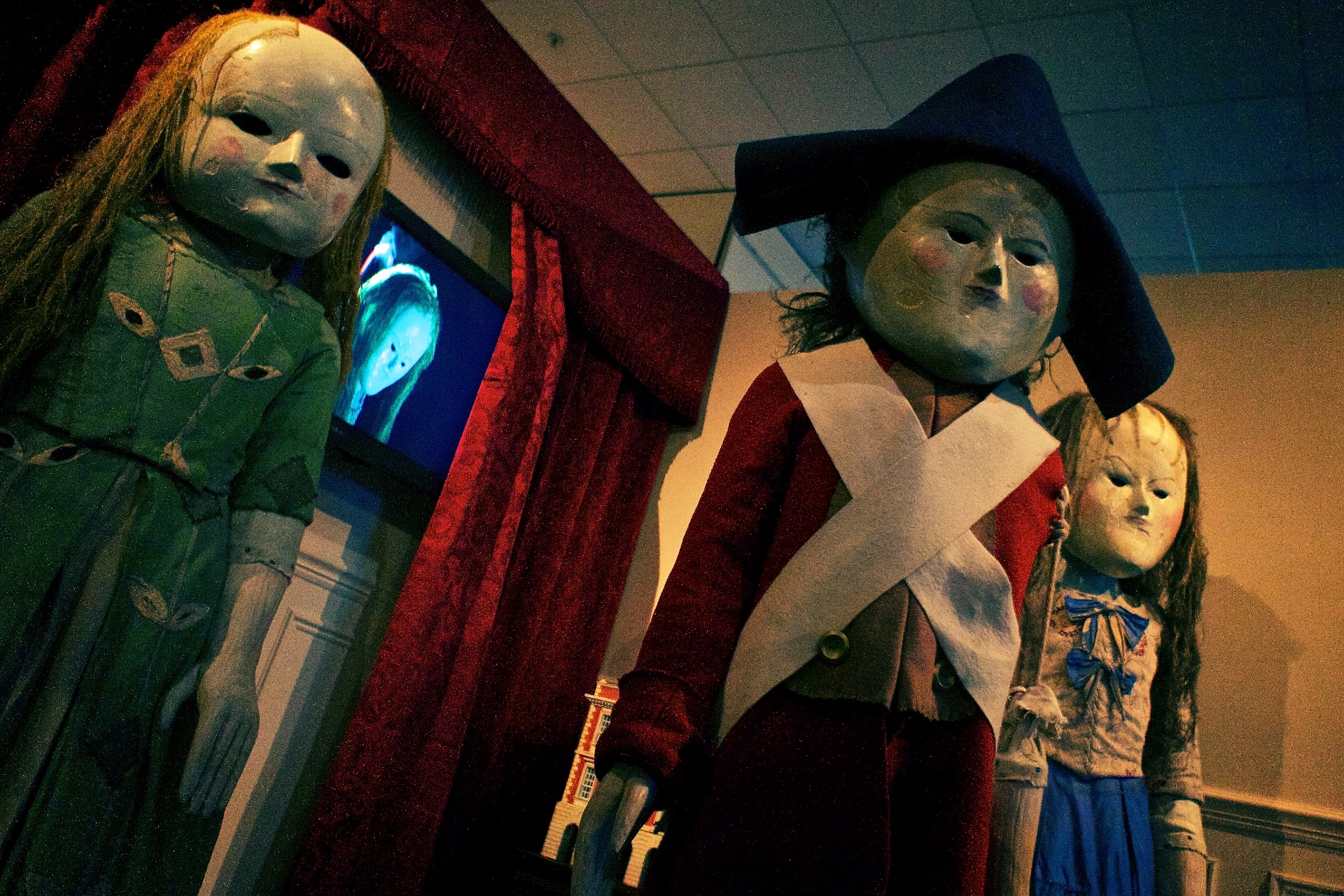
The dolls as they appear at the Doctor Who Experience.

IGN's Matt Risley rated the episode 8 out of 10, praising Gatiss's script which "moved the drama and horror straight into the miniaturised heart of a rickety creepy dolls house, with a set of villains that — while never as memorable or scary as their look may suggest — used sound design to its most effective". He said that the main story "soared", though the sidelined Amy and Rory left "little impact" in relation to the Doctor, George, and Alex. Russell Lewin of SFX gave "Night Terrors" three and a half out of five stars, saying that it had "many great things going for it but perhaps hasn't quite got that little extra something that would have turned it into a classic" and that nothing seemed especially unexpected. However, he praised the shots of the doll house and apartment buildings, the sound, dolls, the acting of Matt Smith and Daniel Mays, and the idea of George being an alien who created the reality.

Blair Marnell of CraveOnline noted that "Night Terrors" was reminiscent of the second series episode "Fear Her", but said that this episode "fared a little bit better because it didn't rely on Jamie Oram's George to be anything more than a scared little boy". She also praised Matt Smith's performance and Arthur Darvill's Rory, who was "quickly becoming one of the funniest companions of the new Doctor Who", though she commented that Amy's transformation into a doll was "kind of glossed over within the story itself" and "there was never any doubt that it would be reversed". Overall, the episode was given a 7 out of 10 rating. Sam McPherson, writing for Zap2it, called "Night Terrors" the "worst episode of series 6 so far" that was an "incoherent mess of an episode that was utterly unenjoyable" and gave it an overall grade of a C+. He criticised the idea to follow up a story arc-heavy episode with a standalone one, as he felt it "served as a speed bump for the forward momentum started in "A Good Man Goes to War" and continued through "Let's Kill Hitler". He thought that its "biggest flaw" was that George was sidelined in favour of Alex, which missed an opportunity to make it a story "about little boys overcoming fear and fighting off the monsters in their closets". However, he did praise dialogue delivered by Smith and Darvill.

Because the episode was originally planned to be in the first half of the series, many of the reviewers mentioned that it was strange that Amy and Rory did not comment upon what had happened previously, such as what had happened to their child. McPherson noted the "tacked-on" nursery rhyme foreshadowing the Doctor's death was included, though he thought it was "unintelligible" and did not count.
