= Let's Kill Hitler =

219 – "Let's Kill Hitler"
- Doctor Who episode

Cast
- Doctor: Matt Smith – Eleventh Doctor
- Companions: Karen Gillan – Amy Pond; Arthur Darvill – Rory Williams; Alex Kingston – River Song
- Others: Nina Toussaint-White – Mels; Caitlin Blackwood – Amelia Pond; Maya Glace-Green – Young Mels; Ezekiel Wigglesworth – Young Rory; Philip Rham – Zimmerman; Richard Dillane – Carter; Amy Cudden – Anita; Davood Ghadami – Jim; Ella Kenion – Harriet; Albert Welling – Adolf Hitler; Mark Killeen – German Officer; Paul Bentley – Professor Candy; Eva Alexander – Nurse; Tor Clark – Female Teacher

Production
- Directed by: Richard Senior
- Written by: Steven Moffat
- Produced by: Marcus Wilson
- Executive producers: Steven Moffat; Piers Wenger; Beth Willis
- Music by: Murray Gold
- Production code: 2.8
- Series: Series 6
- Running time: 50 minutes
- First broadcast: 27 August 2011

Chronology
← Preceded by "A Good Man Goes to War"	Followed by → "Night Terrors"

"Let's Kill Hitler" is the eighth episode of the sixth series of the British science fiction television series Doctor Who, and was first broadcast on BBC One, Space and BBC America on 27 August 2011. It was written by Steven Moffat and directed by Richard Senior.

In the episode, alien time traveller the Doctor (Matt Smith) and his companions Amy Pond (Karen Gillan) and her husband Rory Williams (Arthur Darvill) crash land in 1938 Berlin when the TARDIS is hijacked by Amy and Rory's childhood friend, Mels (Nina Toussaint-White). They accidentally save Adolf Hitler (Albert Welling) who was scheduled for torture by the Teselecta, a time-travelling justice department. When shot by Hitler, Mels unexpectedly regenerates into River Song, the grown version of Amy and Rory's child who had been taken away from them. As River is a criminal herself due to her future execution of the Doctor, the Teselecta pursue her instead, whilst the Doctor faces death from her poisoned lipstick.

Moffat intended for "Let's Kill Hitler" to be more lighthearted than the series opener, and he intended to make fun of Hitler. The episode concludes many elements of River Song's arc. The episode was filmed around March and April 2011, although the opening sequence, set in a cornfield, was filmed much later in the final scenes shot for the series as the production crew had to wait for the corn to grow. Much of Berlin was filmed in Swansea, while the Temple of Peace in Cardiff was also used as a location. In the UK, the episode attracted 8.10 million viewers, the second most-watched episode of the series. Critical reception was mostly positive, though some were critical of the Teselecta and various aspects of the setting and characters.

== Plot ==
=== Prequel ===
On 15 August 2011, the BBC released a short "prequel" to "Let's Kill Hitler", written by Steven Moffat. In the prequel, Amy calls the Eleventh Doctor and leaves a message for the Doctor on the TARDIS's answer phone, begging him to find her child, Melody. Though Amy knows Melody will grow up to be River Song, she does not want to miss seeing her grow up. As she ends her message, it is revealed that a very upset Doctor was listening but did not pick up the phone, even though Amy had pleaded for him to.

=== Synopsis ===
In modern-day Leadworth, Amy and Rory create a crop circle to gain the Doctor's attention via its newspaper coverage. He arrives with his TARDIS, but Amy and Rory's childhood friend Mels coerces them to travel back in time to "kill Hitler". Inside the TARDIS, Mels fires a gun, damaging the TARDIS and sending it out of control.

Back in 1938 Berlin, the Teselecta, a shape-changing, human-looking robot piloted by a human crew from the future miniaturised inside it, is seeking to deliver justice on major criminals from the past by torturing them. The TARDIS crashes into Hitler's office as the Teselecta tortures Hitler and knocks over the Teselecta. Hitler shoots at the Teselecta, but accidentally hits Mels instead. As Rory locks Hitler in a cupboard, Mels regenerates, becoming the woman the Doctor knows as River Song. River, having been trained by her captors to kill the Doctor, kisses him with a poisonous lipstick which will kill the Doctor within the hour. The Doctor orders Amy and Rory to follow River, while he returns to the TARDIS. The Teselecta, aware that the Doctor's death in 2011 is a "fixed point in time", follows River, having identified her as a war criminal who is responsible for the Doctor's death.

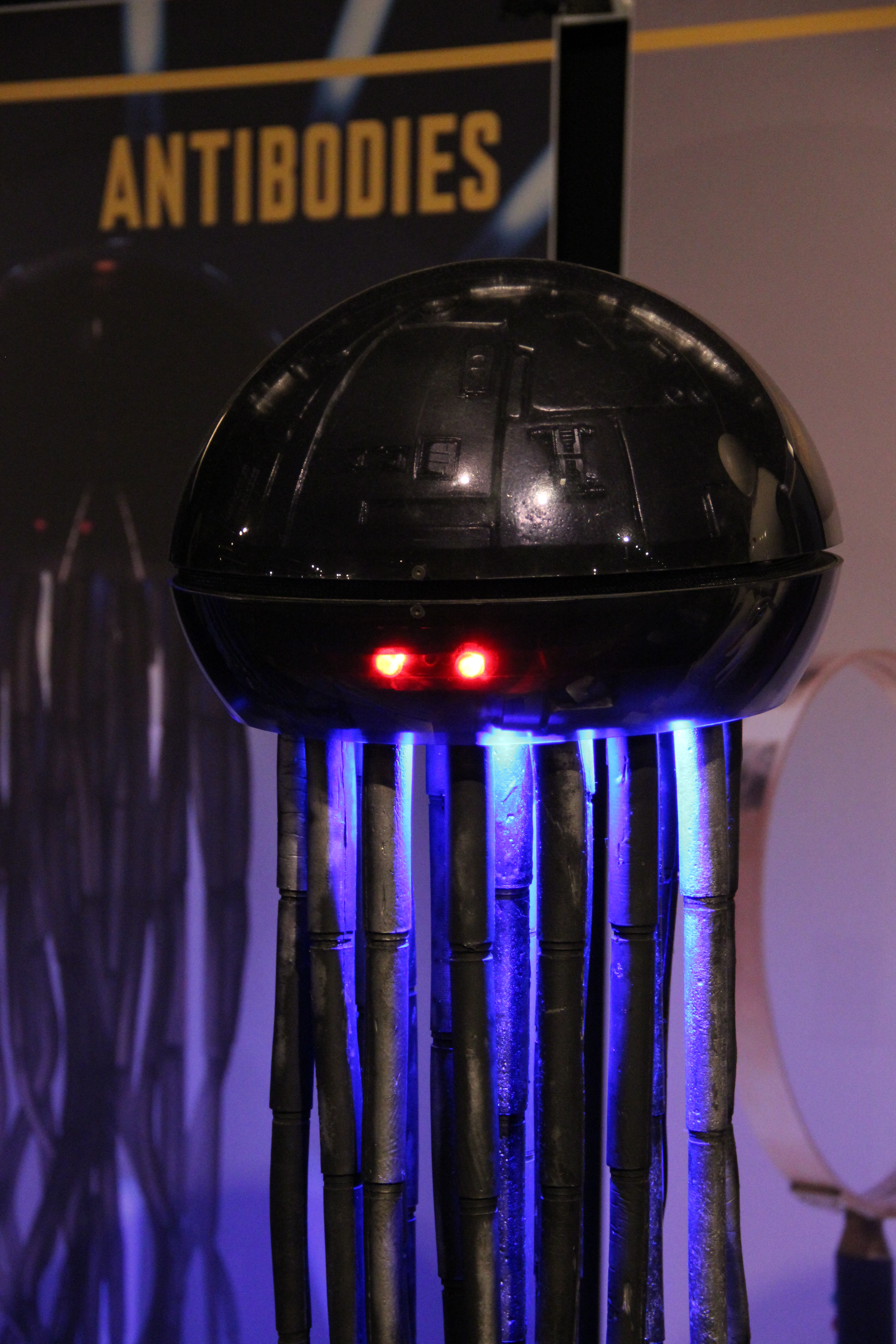
The Teselecta's antibodies, as shown at the Doctor Who Experience

The dying Doctor, having become aware of the Teselecta's nature, stops the Teselecta from punishing River at the Hotel Adlon. The captain, Carter, speaks to the Doctor, informing him that River has been trained to kill him by the Silence, a religious order that believes that silence will fall when "the oldest question in the universe" is asked. Amy forces the crew to abandon the Teselecta. Amy, Rory, and River find the Doctor near death; the Doctor asks River to find "River Song" and give her a message, then whispers something in her ear before he dies. River, who at this point still only knows herself as Melody Pond, asks Amy who River Song is. Amy uses the Teselecta records to show her who she will become. With this, River sacrifices her remaining regenerations to bring the Doctor back to life, and passes out. The Doctor, Amy, and Rory take her to a hospital in the far future, leaving a diary as a gift by her bedside, and depart. Aboard the TARDIS, the Doctor has discovered the date of his death from the records aboard the Teselecta.

=== Continuity ===
This episode reveals the origins to several facets of the River Song character. Before transforming into River, Mels states that she was the young girl seen regenerating at the end of "Day of the Moon", becoming "a toddler" who presumably grew up to become Mels. River's worn TARDIS-coloured diary, which the Doctor and his companions have seen in her relative future, is given to her brand-new by the Doctor. The Doctor introduces her to the concept of "spoilers", seen originally in the Tenth Doctor story "Silence in the Library"/"Forest of the Dead", and becoming a virtual catchphrase for River. River's aptitude for flying the TARDIS—having been taught how by the machine itself—is demonstrated in "The Time of Angels"; River explains she "had lessons from the very best" (which the Doctor assumes refers to himself) and that the Doctor was "busy that day". The Teselecta crew consider River a wanted, dangerous criminal; River is shown being in prison in her personal future in "The Time of Angels" for killing "the best man I ever knew". In this episode's epilogue, River joins the Luna University to become an archaeologist, in order to find the Doctor. Her previous appearances (events which take place later in River's personal timeline) show that she will/has acquired her degrees. When River wakes up in hospital, the Doctor says "Rule One: The Doctor lies". This rule is 'repeated' by River herself in "The Big Bang", a future event in her own personal timeline.

While activating the voice interface aboard the TARDIS, the Doctor is shown holograms of his former companions Rose Tyler (Billie Piper), Martha Jones (Freema Agyeman) and Donna Noble (Catherine Tate). He rejects these, as they all cause him guilt. He eventually settles on the young Amelia (Caitlin Blackwood), who also appears (in flashback scenes of Amy's past) interacting with a younger Mels and Rory. The young Amelia voice interface brings up "fish fingers and custard", an allusion to the Doctor's meal with the real Amelia in "The Eleventh Hour". The concept of "fixed points in time" has been explored before, such as in "The Fires of Pompeii". The supposed "state of temporal grace" within the TARDIS was previously asserted by the Fourth Doctor during The Hand of Fear (1976).

== Production ==
=== Writing and casting ===
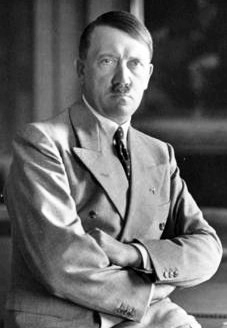
Showrunner Steven Moffat wanted to "take the mickey out of" Hitler in the episode.

Serving as the mid-series premiere, it is the opposite of the tone of the opening story "The Impossible Astronaut" / "Day of the Moon", which was "grim and dark". Writer Steven Moffat wanted to show Hitler in a comedic light and "take the mickey out of him" instead of making him "an icon of evil". He compared it to a scene in an Indiana Jones film which made fun of Hitler.

Moffat enjoyed writing Mels' regeneration scene, finding comedy in her checking out her new body. He asserts that the episode is the beginning of River's story and shows how she became the woman the Doctor met in previous episodes. During the moments after her regeneration, River reenacts the iconic scene between Mrs Robinson (Anne Bancroft) and Benjamin (Dustin Hoffman) from the movie The Graduate, calling out to the Doctor "Hello, Benjamin". The camera angle is also a tribute to the film. The Doctor previously likened River to Mrs Robinson in "The Impossible Astronaut".

The cast and crew felt that the costume and make-up artists did a good job with Albert Welling, as he looked so much like Hitler it was a "surreal" experience. Ella Kenion, who plays Harriet in this episode, later appeared in the Fourth Doctor audio drama The Wrath of the Iceni where she played Boudica. Arthur Darvill was pleased that his character, Rory, was more of an "action hero" in the episode. Before broadcast, actor Matt Smith stated that it was "maybe [his] favorite episode to date...it just rockets along". Smith's Doctor debuted his secondary jacket, a long dark-green military overcoat, for the first time in this episode. In an interview for the previous series concerning the Eleventh Doctor's costume, executive producer Piers Wenger said, "I think he'd really like to evolve it next series. He's really keen to have a coat." Smith explained that he wanted a coat because of the cold weather.

=== Filming and effects ===
The read-through for "Let's Kill Hitler" took place on 21 March 2011. The opening shots in the cornfield were the last ones filmed of the series on 11 July 2011. The scene was filmed last because the crew had to wait for the corn to grow; Moffat had written the scene in February. Much of Berlin was filmed in Swansea. Vintage vehicles from the period were used; Darvill loved the motorbike, although he was not allowed to ride it as it was the job of the stuntman. The Temple of Peace in Cardiff used in the episode for the German dinner party was also used for Karen Gillan's first Doctor Who appearance, when she played a Soothsayer in "The Fires of Pompeii". Smith, Gillan and Darvill had previously filmed in the Temple of Peace for "Cold Blood" in the previous series. Hitler's office was one of the biggest sets that had been built for the show. Typically it would have been filmed in a real building, but the TARDIS had to crash through the wall and thus the set had to be destroyed with an air cannon. The Large Hadron Collider in Switzerland was the inspiration for the design of the Teselecta corridors.

One scene involving the Teselecta (disguised as a German soldier) chasing Amy and Rory on motorcycles through Berlin was cut from filming due to budget issues. AT&T, who wanted to advertise in the United States broadcast of the episode on BBC America as a tie-in to their "Rethink possible" slogan, brought the idea of using a motion comic to create a bridging scene within the advertising break where this scene would have been placed. AT&T and BBC America worked with Moffat and Senior to create the 60 second scene, which was animated by Double Barrel Motion Labs.

== Broadcast and reception ==
"Let's Kill Hitler" was first broadcast on 27 August 2011 on BBC One in the United Kingdom. Internationally, it was broadcast in America on sister station BBC America on 27 August as well as on Space in Canada. Overnight ratings showed that the episode was watched by 6.2 million viewers on BBC One, the second most viewed show of the day behind The X Factor. The episode also came in at number one on the BBC iPlayer service the day after it aired as well as topping the requests on the service for the month of August with 0.99 million views. The episode also received an Appreciation Index of 85, considered "excellent". Final viewing figures came in at 8.10 million, the eleventh most watched programme of the week. It was also the second most-watched episode of the sixth series, behind "The Impossible Astronaut".

Some viewers complained to the BBC believing they heard a German guard say the profanity "where the fuck is he?" However, the BBC stated he said, "Halt, was machen Sie?", which means "Stop, what are you doing?" in German.

=== Critical reception ===
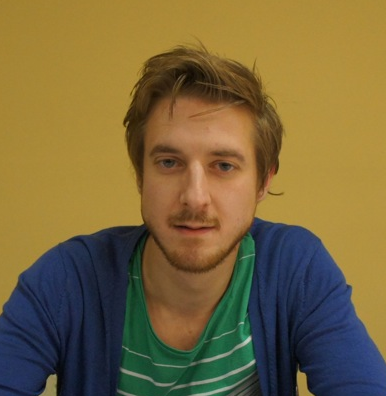
At least one critic and Arthur Darvill himself were pleased that Rory had become more of an action hero in the episode.

The episode received mostly positive reviews from critics. Dan Martin, writing for The Guardian, was more pleased with "Let's Kill Hitler" as an opener than "A Good Man Goes to War" as a finale, and said it was "an energetic, timey-wimey tour de force with gags and flourishes like the car and the crop circles that still maintained a strong sense of what it was about". He also commended Alex Kingston's performance, saying that "she got to steal her every scene even more completely than usual, masterfully swerving the episode into a properly emotional final act". Martin later rated it the sixth best episode of the series, though the finale was not included in the list. He commented that it may be "divisive" amongst fans as it was criticised for not making sense to casual viewers of the programme, but Martin said he "loved it". Michael Hogan of The Daily Telegraph gave the episode four out of five stars, praising it for being "jam-packed full of ideas, twists, turns and wibbly-wobbly time-bending stuff" and "giddily thrilling entertainment, albeit rather exhausting". He also praised the way it allowed Rory to "finally find his niche".

Writing for The Independent, Neela Debnath praised the lighter mood and "great slapstick moments". Though she thought the identity of Mels was "obvious to everyone but the characters", she said that Nina Toussaint-White was "excellent" and that "it was shame that she regenerated so early on because she brought a different energy to the character". Radio Times reviewer Patrick Mulkern, unlike Debnath, admitted that Mels' true identity "took [him] completely by surprise". He thought that a plot hole was generated in terms of what Melody did in between regenerating in 1969 and joining Amy and Rory, still as a child, 20 years later, but said that "the episode moves too fast for such quibbles to stick, and it is hilarious". Ken Tucker of Entertainment Weekly called it "a marvelously energetic, funny, clever, noble mid-season start" and praised the acting of Smith, Gillan, Darvill, and particularly Kingston, as well as the emotion that developed in the episode.

IGN's Matt Risley gave the episode a score of 9 out of 10, saying that it was "arguably Moffat's most unashamedly fun Time Lord romp yet". While he praised the humour, plot and character development, he was critical of the Teselecta; though they "score[d] high on the sci-fi kitsch factor" they were "anything but memorable". SFX magazine critic Richard Edwards gave "Let's Kill Hitler" five out of five stars, thinking it "has to rank among the cleverest Who episodes Moffat has ever written". While he praised Kingston's performance, he wrote that "it's Matt Smith who steals the show, in one of his finest performances as the Doctor...he's utterly magnificent, whether acting the joker, or living out 32 minutes (ish) of death scene. The mix of optimism...and sadness is a tricky thing to pull off, yet Smith does it in a quintessentially Doctor way". Keith Phipps of The A.V. Club graded the episode as a B+, saying that he was "a bit divided". He praised Moffat's River Song arc, which made "the mind [reel]...in a good way", as well as the dialogue and "big concepts". On the other hand, he did not think the Teselecta's mission was developed and "as characters they seem kind of bland". What "really trouble[d]" him was that it did not have the "impact" of some previous episodes and he thought it unlikely that Amy and Rory were willing to quickly accept that they were meant to raise their daughter as a school friend.

Jim Shelley of The Daily Mirror was also negative about the episode, especially towards Alex Kingston, who appeared to be acting while "the rest of the cast play their parts perfectly naturally". The Daily Telegraph reviewer Gavin Fuller said that Moffat "delivered a pacy romp" and praised the concept of the Teselecta, but was disappointed with the "wasted opportunity" of the setting. He thought that the setting offered "great dramatic potential" but was "little more than window dressing for the story". He also felt using Hitler as a comic relief "struck a wrong note given the nature of the man and the regime he led" and that it was "an odd way to treat such an historically significant character". He was also critical of Moffat's "seeming keenness to kill the regular cast in some way, shape or form". However, Entertainment Weekly's Tucker thought that it "didn't need Hitler to be an excellent [Doctor Who] episode".

== See also ==
- Killing baby Hitler – Ethical and physical thought experiment
