= A Christmas Carol (Doctor Who) =

2010 British TV Christmas programme

213 – "A Christmas Carol"
- Doctor Who episode

Cast
- Doctor: Matt Smith – Eleventh Doctor
- Companions: Karen Gillan – Amy Pond; Arthur Darvill – Rory Williams
- Others: Michael Gambon – Kazran/Elliot Sardick; Katherine Jenkins – Abigail; Laurence Belcher – Young Kazran; Danny Horn – Adult Kazran; Leo Bill – Pilot; Pooky Quesnel – Captain; Micah Balfour – Co-pilot; Steve North – Old Benjamin; Bailey Pepper – Boy & Benjamin; Tim Plester – Chief Servant; Laura Rogers – Isabella; Meg Wynn-Owen – Old Isabella

Production
- Directed by: Toby Haynes
- Written by: Steven Moffat
- Produced by: Sanne Wohlenberg
- Executive producers: Steven Moffat; Piers Wenger; Beth Willis
- Music by: Murray Gold
- Production code: 2.X
- Running time: 60 minutes
- First broadcast: 25 December 2010

Chronology
← Preceded by "The Big Bang"	Followed by → "The Impossible Astronaut"

"A Christmas Carol" is an episode of the British science fiction television programme Doctor Who. It is the sixth Doctor Who Christmas special since the programme's revival in 2005, and it was broadcast on 25 December 2010 on both BBC One and BBC America, making it the first episode to premiere on the same day in both the United Kingdom and United States. It was written by Steven Moffat and directed by Toby Haynes.

In the episode, a crashing space liner with more than four thousand people on board has been caught in a strange cloud belt. The alien time traveller the Doctor (Matt Smith) lands on the planet below and meets the miserly Kazran Sardick (Michael Gambon), a man who can control the cloud layer but refuses to help. Inspired by Charles Dickens's 1843 novella A Christmas Carol, the episode has the Doctor attempting to use time travel to alter Kazran's past and make him kinder so that he will save the spaceship.

Moffat enjoyed writing the episode and was a fan of Dickens' story himself. The story features flying sharks and fish, which were things Moffat was afraid of as a child. The episode features the acting debut of Welsh singer Katherine Jenkins, who also sang in the episode with a song written specifically for her. "A Christmas Carol" was filmed through July and August 2010 mainly on sets designed by the show's new set designer Michael Pickwoad. The special was seen by 12.11 million viewers in the UK and received generally positive reviews from critics.

== Plot ==
=== Synopsis ===
A space liner carrying more than four thousand passengers loses control when passing through strange electrified clouds over a human-inhabited planet. The Eleventh Doctor discovers the clouds are controlled by the bitter old man Kazran Sardick, who refuses to allow the ship to land safely. Discovering Kazran's fear of his domineering father, the inventor of the cloud controlling machine, and his wish to never be like him, the Doctor travels to Kazran's past to change it. Meeting Kazran as a young boy, the Doctor uses his sonic screwdriver to summon a shark that swims in the clouds and fog. The shark eats the screwdriver, wounding it, and is unable to swim back to the clouds. To save the shark, Kazran takes her to a cryogenics storeroom where Kazran's father has kept people in storage as "security" for loans, including a woman called Abigail. Abigail, once released, sings to soothe the shark while the Doctor uses Abigail's storage unit to transport the shark back to the skies. As the Doctor and Kazran return Abigail to storage, Kazran promises her they will see her every Christmas Eve. The Doctor keeps this promise, and romance blooms between Kazran and Abigail. However, after one such visit, Kazran requests the Doctor end the practice, keeping Abigail in storage indefinitely as Abigail has an incurable illness and one day left to live. Though old Kazran in the present is pleased with his new memories, he remains bitter at Abigail's fate and refuses to help save the ship.

Old Kazran is soon visited by holographic images of the ship's crew and passengers in the present, imploring Kazran's help, but he waves away the holograms. The Doctor appears, bringing young Kazran with him to show the child Kazran his future; the realisation of how much his bitter future self now resembles his feared father causes Kazran to change his mind and decide to save the ship. The Doctor finds his changes to Kazran's past have locked him out from the controls of Kazran's father's machine. The Doctor instead has Abigail sing through one half of the broken sonic screwdriver; the other half, still in the shark, resonates in the atmosphere, disrupting the storm to allow the ship to land safely. Kazran releases Abigail knowing this will be the last time, but Abigail understands and believes it is time for them to share a Christmas Day.

=== Continuity ===
Several nods to earlier outfits in the series appear in "A Christmas Carol". Amy Pond wears her kissogram policewoman's outfit from Series 5's "The Eleventh Hour", while Rory Williams wears a Roman centurion's outfit as seen in "The Pandorica Opens". In one of the many Christmas Eves the Doctor and Kazran spend with Abigail, they present themselves to her in long, stripy scarves, the Fourth Doctor's trademark accessory. The two also appear in fezzes, an item of clothing the Doctor became fond of in "The Big Bang". Kazran's controls are "isomorphic", which means that only he can use them. In Pyramids of Mars (1975), the TARDIS's controls are said to be isomorphic, though in subsequent adventures this feature was retained or ignored as the plot demanded.

== Production ==
=== Writing ===
Writer Steven Moffat, who was also head writer and executive producer of the series, wanted to make the special "really Christmassy" because the previous Christmas special, "The End of Time", had been darker than usual as it led to the Tenth Doctor's (David Tennant) regeneration. He stated that he had "never been so excited about writing anything. I was laughing madly as I typed along to Christmas songs in April". Moffat stated that A Christmas Carol was "probably [his] favourite Christmas story" and that it lent itself to Doctor Who, as there was an aspect similar to time travel in the story. He also pointed out that the Doctor intentionally based his reform of Kazran on Charles Dickens' story; Dickens exists as a character in the Doctor Who universe, having appeared in the 2005 episode "The Unquiet Dead" and the 2011 episode "The Wedding of River Song". The concept of the sky shark was based on Moffat's childhood fear of sharks which had evolved to swim outside the water.

Moffat noted that Kazran was unlike other villains found in Doctor Who, as he was not completely "wicked". Instead he was more of a "damaged" character; the Doctor recognises this when Kazran demonstrates his inability to hit a little boy, due to it reminding him of when his father beat him. This allowed the Doctor to want to change his past and "defrost" his soul. The phrase "halfway out of the dark" is used in the episode, a reference to the fact that the hard winter is almost over as well as a metaphor for Kazran.

=== Casting ===
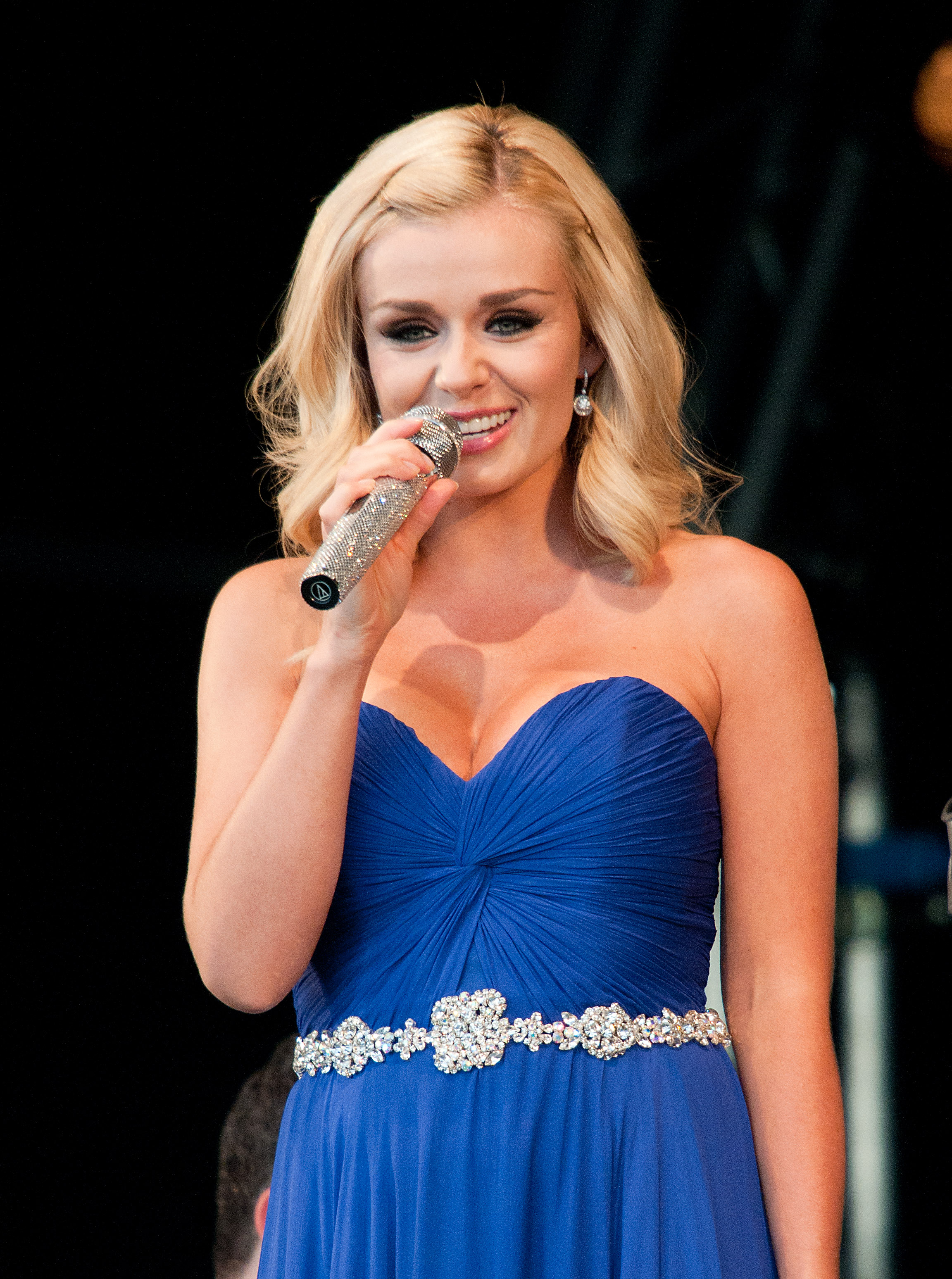
Welsh singer Katherine Jenkins makes her acting debut in the episode.

Starting with this episode, Arthur Darvill achieved regular status as companion Rory. Michael Gambon was cast in the role of Kazran. Andy Pryor, the casting director, did not believe Gambon would be available, and was surprised when Gambon accepted the role. Matt Smith (the Doctor), Karen Gillan (Amy Pond), and Darvill were very honoured to work with him. Moffat stated, "Michael Gambon is as distinguished an actor as I can imagine and the fact that he was Dumbledore means that he is already known to millions of children". Kazran was played as a boy by Laurence Belcher and as a young adult by Danny Horn. Director Toby Haynes said that acting came naturally to Belcher and he "captured the story" and drew the audience in.

The episode also features the acting debut of classical singer Katherine Jenkins. Shortly before her 30th birthday in June 2010, Jenkins was asked about the part, and she accepted. Moffat was unaware that Jenkins had no former acting experience. Jenkins originally was not interested in acting, but thought that she would "like to try" Doctor Who, as it was "such an iconic show". Producer Sanne Wohlenberg believed that Jenkins was "a perfect fit" for the role, though she was nervous.

=== Filming and effects ===
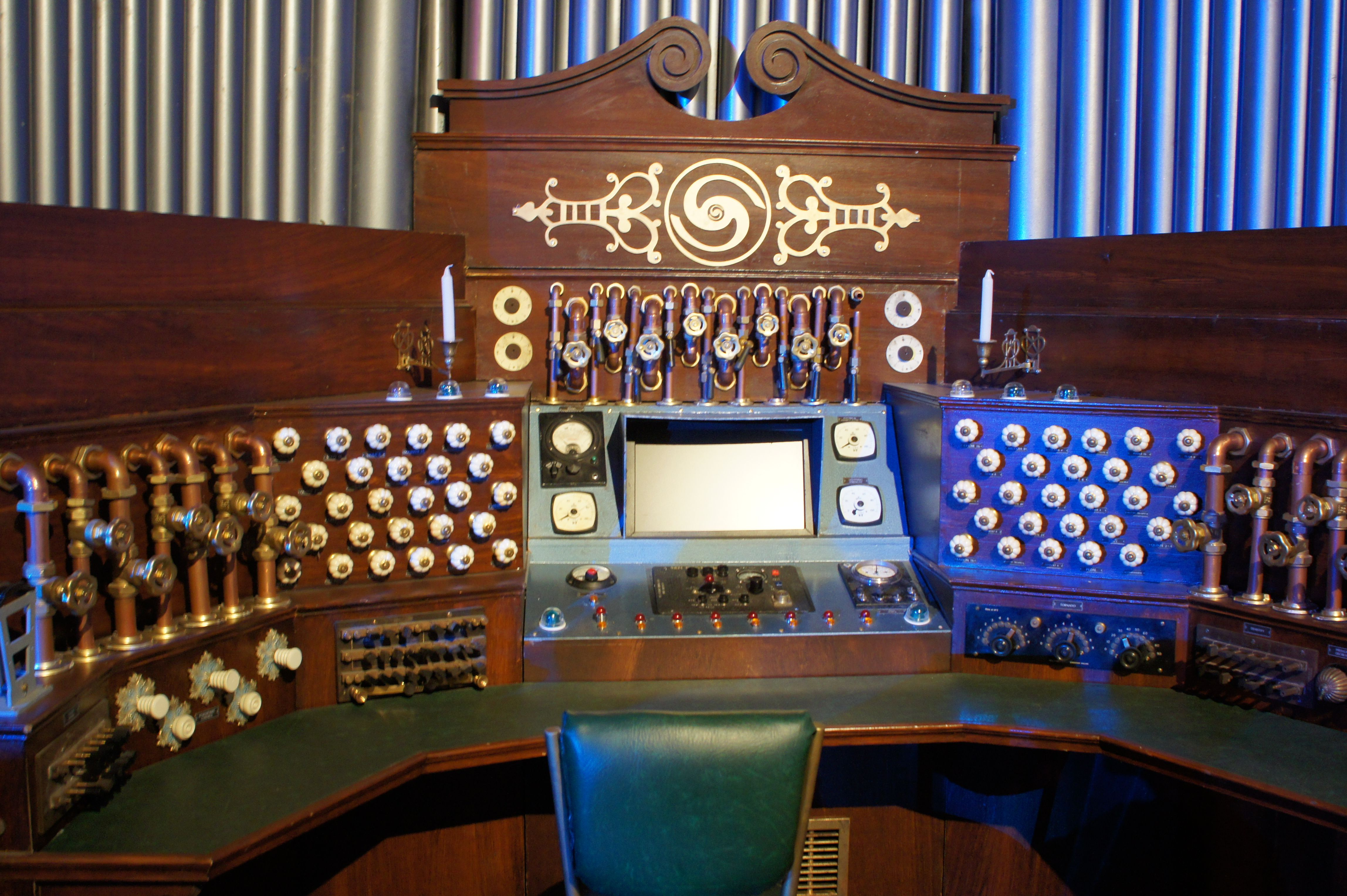
The controls in Kazran's study, on display at a Doctor Who exhibition.

A read-through took place in Cardiff on Thursday, 8 July and production started on 12 July 2010 and lasted into August 2010. The episode marked the debut of Michael Pickwoad as the new set designer. Pickwoad and Haynes worked together to create the town, incorporating elements that would be needed in a society that shared its daily life with fish. Nearly all windows in the town are round, reminiscent of submarines. The structures were made out of metal, filmed at a local steel works. Kazran's study was designed to be very large, as Kazran spent several scenes in there alone and would feel "dwarfed" by it. The walls were intended to look like copper that had turned green, which when combined with the red drapes created the Christmas colours of red and green. The painting of Kazran's father was created by taking a picture of Gambon, lightly printing it on a canvas, and painting in the details. Kazran's controls were inspired by a church organ.

The Doctor's first scene in the episode is falling down the chimney and presenting himself to Kazran. Smith was pleased with the entrance of his character, noting similarities between the Doctor and Santa Claus. However, a stuntman performed the scene. For the scene in which a sky fish nibbles on the sonic screwdriver, the screwdriver was dangled in front of a greenscreen and tapped with a pen to create the effect of the fish nudging it. To maintain secrecy of the episode's plot, the model shark was given the codename "Clive". The scenes in which the characters ride through the air in a sleigh pulled by one of the flying sharks was filmed in front of a greenscreen. The sleigh was in fact a rickshaw which crew members rocked back and forth as a wind machine created the effect of flying through the air. As it was impossible to film underneath the rickshaw, a miniature model of the sleigh was used for the shots underneath the sleigh rather than computer-generated effects.

=== Music ===
The episode features a song specifically written for Jenkins, titled "Abigail's Song". In the script it was written that the song was unique and specific to Doctor Who, and composer Murray Gold was contacted to write the song. Jenkins did a demo and then sang the song while filming the actual scene, as she thought it would look more natural. Afterwards she sang the final version and a new, lighter arrangement was composed by the National Orchestra of Wales. Selected pieces of music from this special, as composed by Gold, were released on a soundtrack 21 March 2011 by Silva Screen Records.

== Broadcast and reception ==
"A Christmas Carol" was first broadcast in the United Kingdom on BBC One on Christmas Day 2010. According to overnight figures, "A Christmas Carol" was tied with Come Fly with Me as the second most-watched programme on Christmas Day in the United Kingdom, behind EastEnders, and with an average viewership of 10.3 million peaking at 10.7 million. The final rating for BBC One was 12.11, making the episode the fourth highest rated of the entire canon since the series was revived in 2005, behind previous specials "Voyage of the Damned" (13.31 million, 2007), "The Next Doctor" (13.10 million, 2008), and Part Two of "The End of Time" (12.27 million, 2010). "A Christmas Carol" was the third highest rated show on all UK TV for the week ending 26 December 2010. In addition, 716,000 watched the show on the BBC's iPlayer, making it the eighth most downloaded show for December 2010. This special had an Appreciation Index of 83.

"A Christmas Carol" is the first episode of Doctor Who that was broadcast the same day in the United Kingdom and in the United States on BBC America. In the United States, 727,000 viewers watched "A Christmas Carol", an 8% increase on the previous holiday special, part one of "The End of Time". The special was broadcast in Canada on Space on 26 December and in Australia on ABC1 on the same day, where it had overnight ratings of 880,000 viewers.

=== Critical reception ===
The episode received generally positive reviews. Dan Martin of The Guardian described the episode as a "sumptuous triumph". Website Den of Geek's Simon Brew applauded Moffat for "not taking the easy way out" with the adaptation, saying it was "really quite mad, undoubtedly festive, and it treats the Dickens source material with respect". However, he also wondered if young children "would have enjoyed 'A Christmas Carol' quite as much" as adults. Keith Phipps of The A.V. Club gave the special an A−, naming it the "best Doctor Who Christmas special" he had seen. He praised Gambon, Smith, both actors playing the younger Kazran and thought Gillan and Darvill "[made] the most of what they're given", though he commented that "Katherine Jenkins is more an ethereal presence with a lovely voice...than an actress".

Dave Golder of SFX gave the episode four and a half out of five stars, explaining that, although there were "creaky" moments, it was "the most adult Christmas special we've yet been given, with some complex story-telling techniques, a plot driven by the characters and some quite mind-bending concepts". He praised Jenkins' debut and Smith, whom he described as "a force of nature unleashed on screen". IGN's Cindy White rated the episode 8 out of 10, describing it as a "clever remix" of A Christmas Carol and praising Smith, Gambon, and Jenkins. Brad Trechak, writing for TV Squad, praised Moffat's "expertly woven story". MTV's Rick Marshall called it "easily one of the best episodes of the series' modern era...populated with just the right amount of humor, drama, scares, and sentimental reverence for the classic story that inspired its narrative".

Sam McPherson of Zap2it said that he "enjoyed 'A Christmas Carol' more than I have almost any other special that has aired since the series restarted in 2005", but thought that "some parts were absolutely silly, and others were absolutely incoherent" due to the frantic pace. While he considered Amy and Rory "criminally underused", they were responsible for "heavy laughs" and left the Doctor to be the "delight of the episode". The Daily Telegraph's Chris Harvey was less enthusiastic about the episode, saying that it "started nicely", but that "by the time she was singing to the shark, I'd had enough," while thinking that, "It's not really for old curmudgeons like me, who got more of a kick out of Michael Gambon's miserly Kazran Sardick when he was sneering and snarling at the beginning of the episode than when he had been thoroughly heartwarmed by the end."

"A Christmas Carol" was nominated for the 2011 Hugo Award for Best Dramatic Presentation (Short Form), but lost to the preceding series finale "The Pandorica Opens"/"The Big Bang".

== DVD and Blu-ray release ==
"A Christmas Carol" was released on DVD and Blu-ray as a standalone in Region 2 on 24 January 2011, followed by Region 1 release in the two formats on 15 February 2011. It contained the associated Doctor Who Confidential for the episode, as well as a cut-down version of the Doctor Who Prom. The special was also included in the Complete Sixth Series box set released on 21 November 2011 (Region 2) and 22 November (Region 1).

The ten Christmas specials between "The Christmas Invasion" and "Last Christmas" inclusive were released in a boxset titled Doctor Who – The 10 Christmas Specials on 19 October 2015.

== Soundtrack ==
The soundtrack for the episode was released in the United Kingdom on 21 March 2011 and digitally in the United States on 22 November 2011. The soundtrack features classical music star Katherine Jenkins singing "Abigail's Song". It was reissued on white vinyl LP in a limited first pressing edition of 500 on 1 December 2014.

Doctor Who: A Christmas Carol

Soundtrack album by Murray Gold, Ben Foster, the BBC National Orchestra of Wales and Katherine Jenkins
- Released: 21 March 2011 (United Kingdom); 22 November 2011 (United States)
- Recorded: 2010
- Genre: Soundtrack
- Length: 49:20
- Label: Silva Screen
- Producer: Murray Gold

Doctor Who soundtrack chronology
Series 5 (2010)	A Christmas Carol (2011)	Series 6 (2011)

No.	Title	Length
1.	"Come Along Pond"	1:51
2.	"Halfway Out of the Dark"	1:38
3.	"Pray for a Miracle"	0:37
4.	"Geoff"	3:48
5.	"You Didn't Hit the Boy"	1:44
6.	"Fish"	0:50
7.	"Kazran Sardick 12 1/2"	1:29
8.	"Ghost of Christmas Past"	1:33
9.	"Babysitter"	0:47
10.	"Talk About Girls"	1:41
11.	"Sonic Fishing"	1:43
12.	"Just a Little One"	1:16
13.	"Big Colour"	1:50
14.	"I Can't Save Her"	3:34
15.	"The Other Half's Inside the Shark"	1:07
16.	"Abigail"	1:47
17.	"He Comes Every Christmas"	1:09
18.	"Shark Ride"	1:24
19.	"New Memories"	1:00
20.	"Holding Hands"	1:45
21.	"Christmas Dinner"	0:38
22.	"Goodlucknight"	1:51
23.	"Goodnight Abigail"	2:10
24.	"This Planet Is Ours"	2:00
25.	"Ghost of Christmas Present"	0:48
26.	"The Course of my Life"	1:35
27.	"Ghost of Christmas Future"	1:50
28.	"Abigail's Song (Silence Is All You Know)" (Sung by Katherine Jenkins)	4:41
29.	"Everything Has to End Some Time"	1:14
Total length:		49:20

== See also ==
- Adaptations of A Christmas Carol
