= Sanne Wohlenberg =

German-born television producer

Wohlenberg in 2026

Sanne Wohlenberg (sometimes known as Sanne Craddick) is a German-born television producer working primarily in the United Kingdom. She has produced or co-produced episodes of television including Wallander and the revived series of Doctor Who.

In 2019, she won an Emmy Award for her production of the mini-series Chernobyl.

== Early life ==
Wohlenberg grew up in Wolfsburg and studied in Hamburg before moving to the United Kingdom.

== Career ==
For Doctor Who, Wohlenberg produced the stories A Christmas Carol, The Doctor's Wife, and Night Terrors. In 2019, she produced the HBO mini-series Chernobyl which covered the nuclear disaster in Ukraine (at the time part of the Soviet Union), and was filmed in Lithuania. In 2022, she was announced as a producer for the TV series Andor, a prequel to Rogue One.

In 2019, she won an Emmy Award for Outstanding Limited Series, as the producer of Chernobyl. In 2020, she received the Producers Guild of America nomination for The David L. Wolper Award for Outstanding Producer of Limited Series Television for Chernobyl.

Preceded by Patrick Schweitzer	Doctor Who Producer; 2010–11	Succeeded by Marcus Wilson
