= Oakley Church of England Junior School =

Oakley C of E Junior School

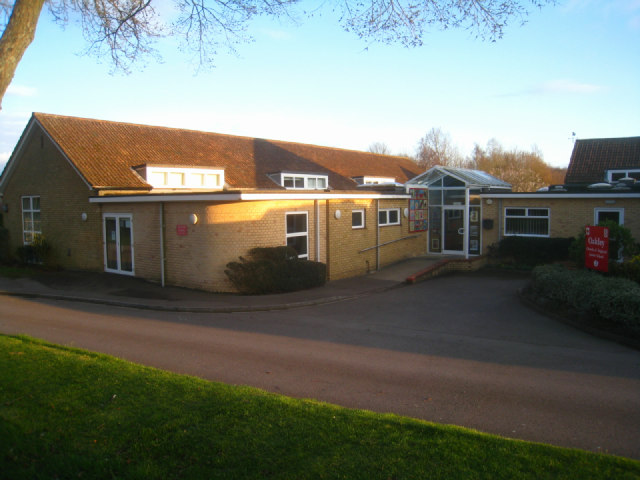

Location
- Oakley Lane; Basingstoke, Hampshire; England; 51.2490°N 1.1803°W

Information
- Type: Voluntary controlled school
- Religious affiliation: Church of England
- Established: 1962; 64 years ago
- Department for Education URN: 116306 Tables
- Ofsted: Reports
- Head: Sarah Hill
- Age: 7 to 11
- Enrolment: 246
- Website: www.oakleyjuniorschool.co.uk

Oakley Church of England Junior School was founded in 1962 and is a junior school that serves the village of Oakley, Hampshire, England. It has multiple facilities, including an outdoor swimming pool, IT suite, copse and a school choir that regularly participates in events at the Anvil Theatre, Basingstoke . The feeder school is Cranbourne Business and Enterprise College. On 10 January 2012 the school turned 50 years old, which was celebrated by all students and teachers.

== "Death Is the Only Answer" ==
A script for a Doctor Who mini-episode was written by students of the school as part of a Doctor Who competition (Script to Screen). Some children won the competition and had it shown on Doctor Who Confidential. The children are now the youngest people to have written a Doctor Who episode.
