= The Impossible Astronaut =

214a – "The Impossible Astronaut"
- Doctor Who episode

Cast
- Doctor: Matt Smith – Eleventh Doctor
- Companions: Karen Gillan – Amy Pond; Arthur Darvill – Rory Williams; Alex Kingston – River Song
- Others: Mark Sheppard – Canton Everett Delaware III; William Morgan Sheppard – Old Canton Everett Delaware III; Stuart Milligan – President Richard Nixon; Chukwudi Iwuji – Carl; Mark Griffin – Phil; Marnix van den Broeke – The Silence; Sydney Wade – Little Girl; Nancy Baldwin – Joy; Adam Napier – Captain Simmons; Henrietta Clemett – Matilda; Paul Critoph – Charles; Kieran O'Connor – Prison Guard; Emilio Aquino – Busboy

Production
- Directed by: Toby Haynes
- Written by: Steven Moffat
- Produced by: Marcus Wilson
- Executive producers: Steven Moffat; Piers Wenger; Beth Willis
- Music by: Murray Gold
- Production code: 2.1
- Series: Series 6
- Running time: 1st of 2-part story, 45 minutes
- First broadcast: 23 April 2011

Chronology
← Preceded by "A Christmas Carol"	Followed by → "Day of the Moon"

"The Impossible Astronaut" is the first episode of the sixth series of the British science fiction television series Doctor Who. The episode was written by showrunner Steven Moffat and directed by Toby Haynes. It was first broadcast on 23 April 2011 in the United Kingdom on BBC One, the United States on BBC America and in Canada on Space. It also aired in Australia on ABC1 on 30 April 2011. The episode features alien time traveller the Doctor (Matt Smith) and his companions Amy Pond (Karen Gillan) and Rory Williams (Arthur Darvill), and is the first of a two-part story, which concluded with "Day of the Moon" on 30 April.

In the episode, the Doctor, Amy, Rory and the archaeologist River Song (Alex Kingston) are summoned together by a version of the Doctor from 200 years in his future. Trying to understand the enigmatic hints about "Space 1969" the older Doctor mentioned and a man they meet in 2011 called Canton Everett Delaware III (Mark Sheppard in 1969 and William Morgan Sheppard in 2011), they travel to the United States in 1969 and discover a scared girl (Sydney Wade) who is trapped inside a spacesuit. The team deals with the Silence, a religious order of aliens which has members who can make people forget their encounter with them when they look away.

The Silence was created to compete with other past aliens in terms of "scariness," including the Weeping Angels. The episode was partially filmed on location at Lone Rock, Utah, the first time in Doctor Who that principal photography took place in the United States. The episode was seen by 8.86 million viewers in the United Kingdom, and received generally positive reviews from critics. "The Impossible Astronaut" gained an Appreciation Index of 88 – considered excellent. The episode's broadcast was dedicated to Elisabeth Sladen, known for playing former companion Sarah Jane Smith, who died from cancer on 19 April 2011.

== Plot ==
=== Prequel ===
On 22 March 2011, a short scene serving as a prequel for the first episode was released on the programme's website. In the prequel, Richard Nixon receives a phone call from the little girl who keeps calling him in the episode. She begs for the President to look behind him, but he asks how she got that number, which the "spaceman" told her. She tells him it is about monsters, to which he replies "Young lady, there are no monsters in the Oval Office." He then hangs up and leans back. Behind him stands an out-of-focus member of the Silence.

=== Synopsis ===
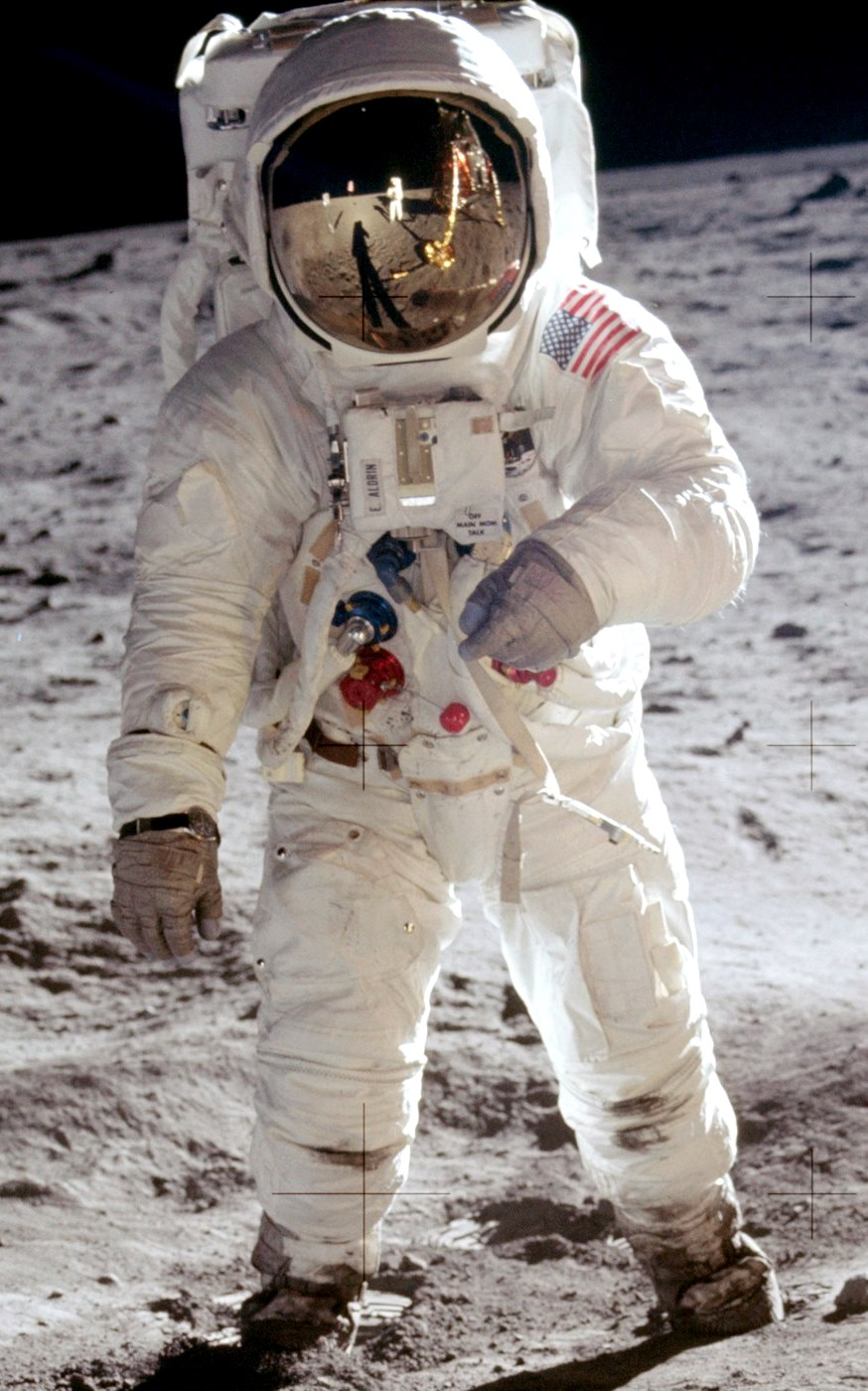
Buzz Aldrin during the 1969 Apollo 11 mission. A replica of this suit was created for the episode.

During a break from their travels with the Eleventh Doctor, his companions Amy and Rory are sent envelopes summoning them to Utah at a specific time and location. They arrive to meet River Song (who also received an envelope) and the Doctor, who is nearly 200 years older than he was when he last saw Amy and Rory. He offers them a picnic, and then a trip to "space 1969". During the picnic, a figure emerges from the lake wearing an American astronaut suit and shoots the Doctor multiple times, causing him to collapse. A man called Canton Everett Delaware III arrives with a can of gasoline, telling Amy, Rory, and River that the dead man is the real Doctor. The Doctor's body is burned in a Viking funeral.

Amy, Rory, and River talk at a diner when they discover the fourth envelope was sent to the Doctor, alive and 200 years younger than the one at the lake. The younger Doctor arrives at the diner where his companions tell him about space 1969 and Canton, but refuse to tell him about his death or that the sender is the Doctor himself.

The Doctor and his companions travel back to 8 April 1969, where the younger Canton, a former FBI operative, is briefed by President Richard Nixon about a series of phone calls Nixon received from a young girl asking for help. The Doctor arrives in Washington, DC and convinces Nixon to give him a few minutes to locate the girl.

Based on the phone call and the girl's mention of a "spaceman", he tracks down the Florida intersection where the girl is located. Meanwhile, Amy meets and takes a photograph of one of the leaders of the Silence, a group she also saw by the lake which people forget about any time someone stops looking at them.

Canton follows the Doctor and the others into the TARDIS as they depart for Florida. When they arrive at the building where the girl is held, they find pieces of a space suit and alien technology. River and Rory explore a vast network of tunnels that have apparently spread across the planet for centuries, unnoticed by the human population but populated by the Silence. Finding Canton unconscious next to a figure in a space suit, Amy tells the Doctor she is pregnant (forced to do so by the Silence she met earlier) before picking up Canton's gun and shooting at the suit. She realises too late that the helmet's visor has opened to reveal the little girl.

=== Continuity ===
The TARDIS had been previously turned invisible by damage to its visual stabiliser in the Second Doctor story The Invasion (1968). When Canton first leaves the TARDIS, the Doctor remarks, "Brave heart, Canton," a reference to the Fifth Doctor's recurrent statement to his companion Tegan Jovanka, "Brave heart, Tegan." When Amy asks the younger Doctor to trust her, he asks her to swear to him on something that matters. After some thought, she smiles and says "Fish fingers and custard," referring to events in "The Eleventh Hour," when Amy first meets the Doctor as a little girl.

== Production ==
=== Writing ===
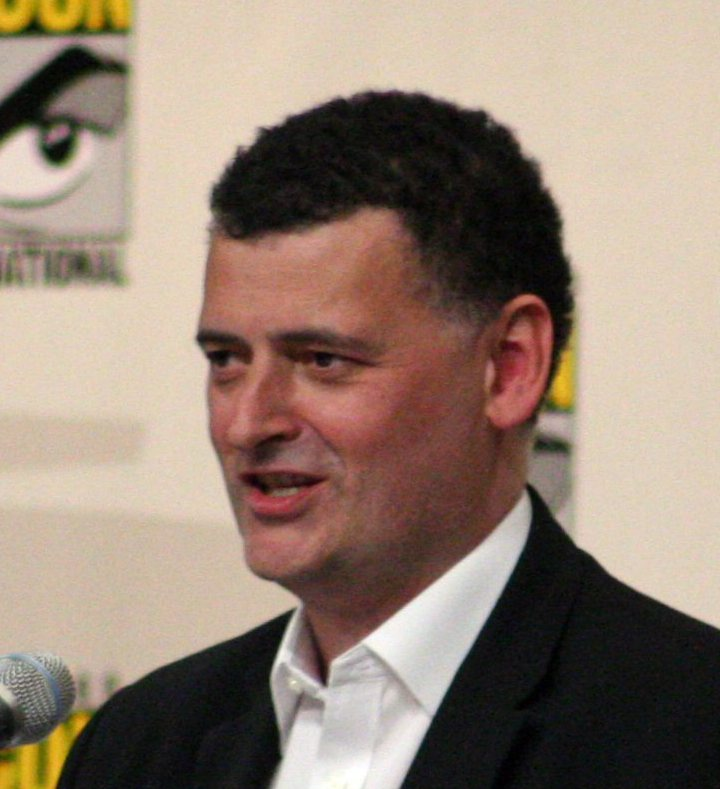
Showrunner and episode writer Steven Moffat (pictured) created the Silence to compete with other creatures in the past in terms of "scariness."

The episode was written by Steven Moffat, who took charge of the show in 2010. Moffat wanted the 2011 season to start with a two-part story in an attempt to begin with more gravity and a wider scope in plot, as well as wanting the episodes to be one of the darker ones in the series. "The Impossible Astronaut" / "Day of the Moon" was the first two-part episode to open a series since the 1985 Sixth Doctor story Attack of the Cybermen.

In the Doctor Who Confidential episode following the broadcast of "The Impossible Astronaut," Moffat stated that in his view, it was one of the darker episodes of the series, but still maintained the same level of humour. The inclusion of the Doctor's death felt like a series ender for some of the producers, but was actually there to "kick it off." In writing the death scene of the older version of the Doctor, Moffat wanted to acknowledge to the audience that Time Lords are not invincible, and could still die permanently if killed before regeneration. In creating the Silence, the alien antagonists of the episode, Moffat wanted them to challenge past monsters in terms of "scariness." He felt these creatures are a "much bigger deal." The aliens' design was partially inspired by the figure from the Edvard Munch painting The Scream.

=== Casting ===
In October 2010, it was announced that Mark Sheppard, who had appeared in other science fiction series including Battlestar Galactica, Firefly, Supernatural, and Warehouse 13, would make a guest appearance on Doctor Who. Sheppard described playing Canton as a "dream job," and said he wished to appear in another of Moffat's works, including Sherlock. Even though Sheppard is an English actor, it was his first appearance in a British-made television show. For the scene depicting the older Canton Delaware, the producers originally planned that Sheppard would appear older using makeup effects. However, Sheppard suggested instead that his father, the actor William Morgan Sheppard, play the role, a suggestion that was accepted.

American actor Stuart Milligan was cast as President Nixon, which he said he found exciting, having played other presidents in the past, including Dwight D. Eisenhower. Prosthetic pieces were applied on Milligan's cheeks, nose, and ears to make him resemble Nixon as much as possible. He also practiced how Nixon would speak, but initially found it difficult since he had to wear fake teeth. Milligan previously appeared in the animated Tenth Doctor special Dreamland as the voice of Colonel Stark. Chukwudi Iwuji, who played Carl, previously appeared in the Seventh Doctor audio drama A Thousand Tiny Wings, where he played Joshua Sembeke.

=== Filming and effects ===
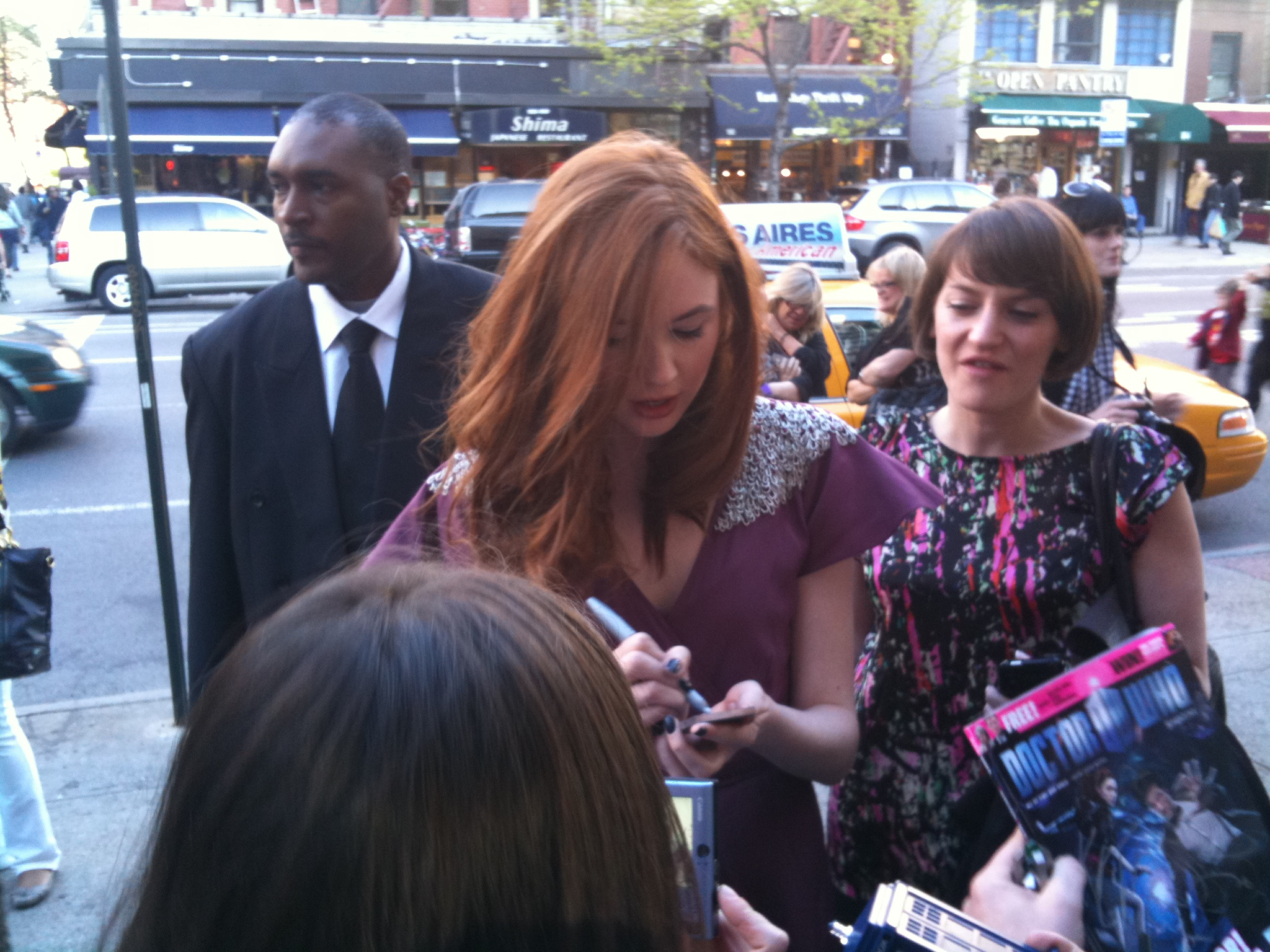
Karen Gillan (centre) was reportedly genuinely upset filming the death scene of the older version of the Doctor.

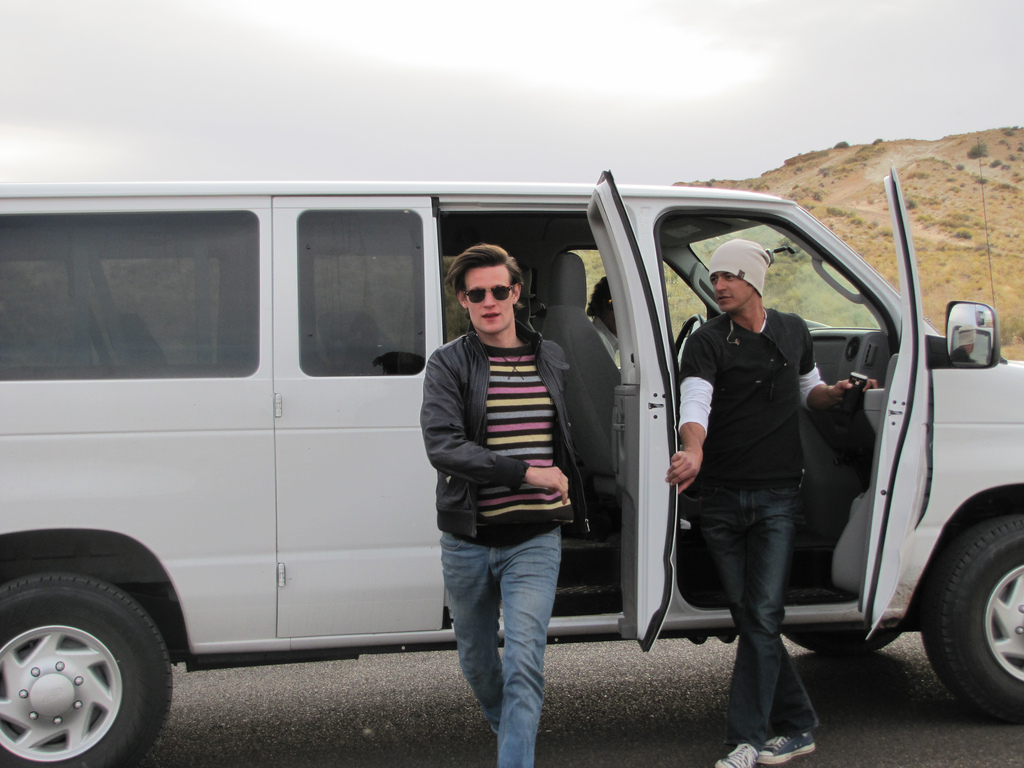
Matt Smith at a filming location in Utah

This pair of episodes marks the first time that Doctor Who has filmed principal photography footage within the United States; the American-produced TV movie of 1996 was filmed in Canada, and some second unit establishing shots of New York and the Statue of Liberty were filmed on Liberty Island for the episode "Daleks in Manhattan", but none of the cast of the episode were involved in the shoot. Filming took place in the state of Utah. For the opening shot for the location, director Toby Haynes wanted it to be epic so that the audience could recognise where the episode was set. Scenes on the roadway were filmed on U.S. Route 163 (several miles east of the coordinates listed on the Doctor's invitations). The crew wanted to add as many American icons as they could into those shots, including a Stetson hat, a 1950s Edsel Villager, and a yellow school bus. Moffat, having enjoyed writing episodes featuring River Song, wanted to give her an impressive entrance. Haynes had actress Alex Kingston block the sunlight from the camera angle and blow smoke from her revolver. The scenes involving the picnic and the future-Doctor dying took place on the shore of Lake Powell. The suit worn by the future-Doctor's killer was a replica of an Apollo space suit. In filming the death scene the filming crew noticed that Karen Gillan was genuinely upset and "was acting her heart out." In filming the "Viking funeral" scene, Haynes wished to film it during the sunset. However, the sun set over the desert, so was instead filmed during sunrise, as the sun rose over the water.

Kingston had to genuinely slap Matt Smith several times in a scene because it was difficult to fake. Kingston recalled that after a few takes, Smith got red cheeked and grew frustrated at having to do the sequence over and over again. The Oval Office set was constructed at Upper Boat Studios in South Wales. Because the production crew had access to several pictures and plans of the real office, they were able to replicate it in almost every detail. The main problem for building the set was the plastering; the crew normally plaster one wall at a time for normal rooms, but because the Oval Office was round, they had to do the entire set at once. The American-style diner scene when the companions reunite with the Doctor in this episode is actually located in Cardiff Bay. The Laurel and Hardy film The Flying Deuces, in which the Doctor intruded, was done by Smith dancing in front of greenscreen.

== Broadcast and reception ==
=== Pre-broadcast leak ===
At some point before the broadcast of the episode, it and "Day of the Moon" were released in a press screening, where a number of fans were invited to attend. The production team present asked them not to give away any spoilers. However, following the screening, a fan gave away the entire plot of the two episodes on an internet forum. News of this angered Moffat. In an interview on BBC Radio 5 Live, Moffat stated;

It's heartbreaking in a way because you're trying to tell stories, and stories depend on surprise. Stories depend on shocking people. Stories are the moments that you didn't see coming, that are what live in you and burn in you forever. If you are denied those, it's vandalism. So to have some twit who came to a press launch, write up a story in the worst, most ham-fisted English you can imagine, and put it on the internet, I just hope that guy never watches my show again, because that's a horrific thing to do.

— Steven Moffat

Despite this he added that the majority of Doctor Who fans are "spoiler-phobes," who refused to go online to be spoiled.

=== Broadcast and ratings ===
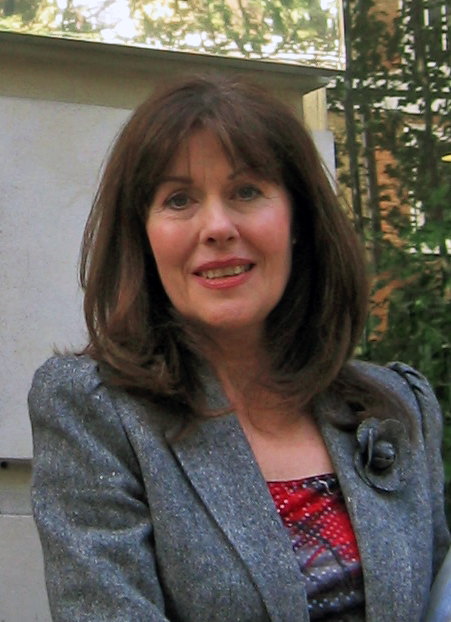
The episode's broadcast was preceded by a still-caption tribute to former Doctor Who actress Elisabeth Sladen (pictured) following her death from cancer.

"The Impossible Astronaut" was first broadcast on BBC One in the United Kingdom on 23 April 2011 at 6 pm. Its broadcast was preceded by a still-caption tribute to actress Elisabeth Sladen, who died from cancer on 19 April 2011. Sladen had previously appeared in the series as companion Sarah Jane Smith, and as the same character on the spin-off series The Sarah Jane Adventures. After the broadcast "The Impossible Astronaut" received preliminary, overnight figures of 6.52 million viewers. Final consolidated ratings for the episode increased to 8.86 million, with a 43.2 per cent audience share. This made the episode the second highest rated programme of the day, behind Britain's Got Talent on ITV1. The episode was the third most watched on BBC One, and sixth overall for the entire week ending 24 April. An additional 300,000 viewed the episode from BBC iPlayer within two days of its original broadcast. It received an Appreciation Index of 88, one of the higher scores for the weekend.

In the United States the episode aired on BBC America on the same day it was released in the United Kingdom, as was the case in Canada for Space. 1.3 million viewers saw "The Impossible Astronaut" on BBC America, making it the highest rated telecast in the history of the channel. It was reportedly up by 71,000 from "The Eleventh Hour". When Live + 7 day DVR ratings were added, the total rose to 1.8 million. In Canada, the episode was seen by 538,000, making it the most watched Who episode for the channel, and its most watched telecast in 2011. It was shown on ABC1 in Australia on 30 April 2011, and was viewed by 860,000 from the five capital cities, matching the ratings from "A Christmas Carol" on Boxing Day 2010.

Audience measurement service Kantar Media reported that "The Impossible Astronaut" is the most recorded television event of all time. Analysis of BARB data revealed that 4.11 million people recorded and viewed the programme within a week of broadcast, accounting for 46% of the episode's total viewers. A total of 1.38 million requests were placed on iPlayer for the month of April, placing it at number one for the month.

=== Critical reception ===
The episode was met with generally positive reviews from television critics. Dan Martin of The Guardian reacted positively towards the episode, believing the cast performed better than the previous fifth series. He stated "Steven Moffat has thrown away the rule book and made Doctor Who as, you imagine, he's pictured it should be his whole life. Killing the Doctor leaves the shape of the series mapped out, raises the bar so that no one is safe, and sees Amy, Rory and River facing a terrible dilemma." Martin liked that "Amy's numbed horror ramps things up to a series-finale level on intensity from the off," and then switches "into an Oval Office comedy of manners," and "morphs into gothic horror and finally flings you to the ground with its cinematic cliffhanger." He was also positive towards the American setting, and "our eccentric British foursome bumbling through it," believing the series raised its game with this. With regards to the Silence, Martin believed it was "a standard Moffat psychological trick, but the most refined to date." Martin later rated it the second best episode of the series, though the finale was not included in the list.

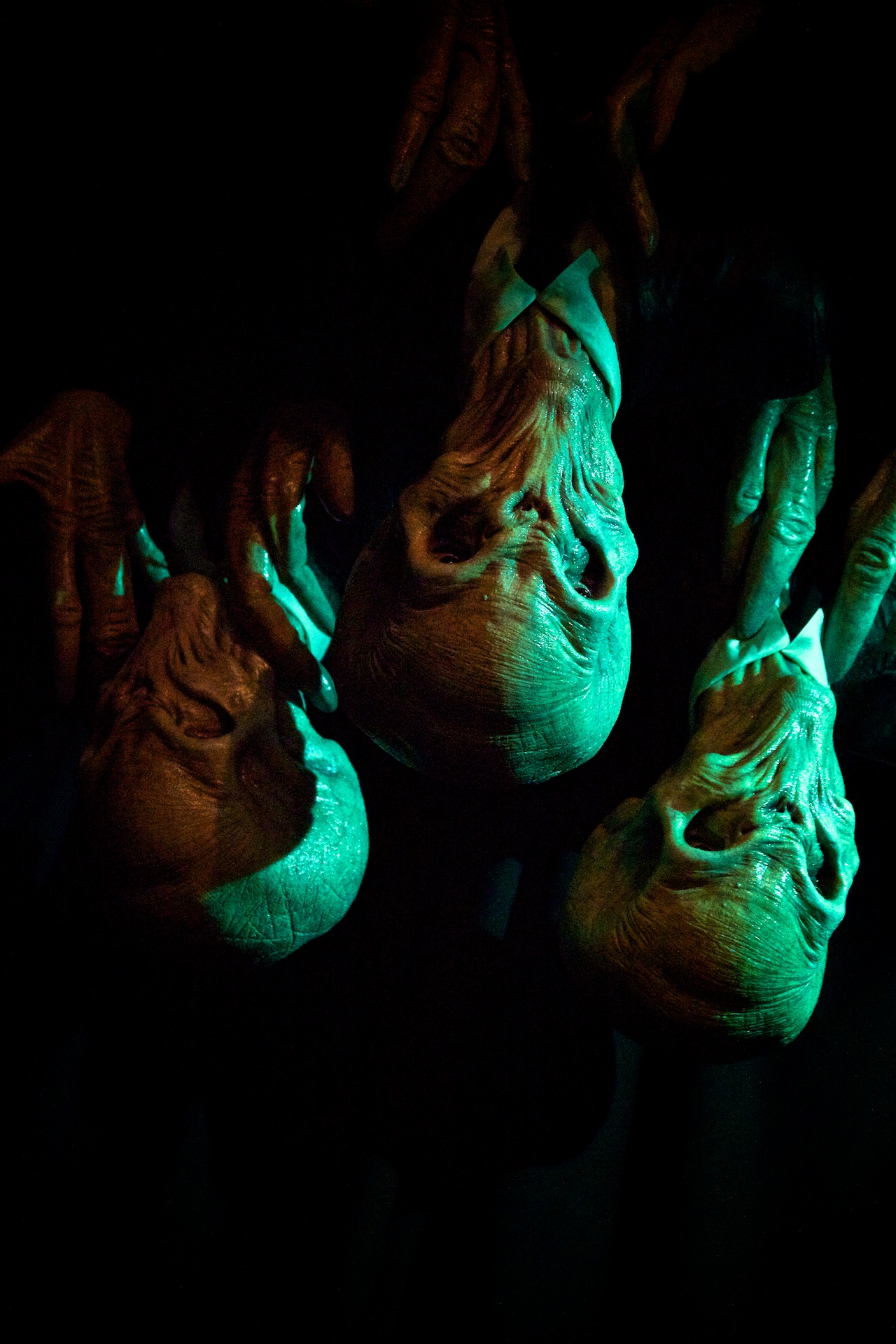
Silence creatures as they appear at the Doctor Who Experience

Morgan Jeffery of Digital Spy called the episode "a fantastic launch for the sixth series," adding "the Doctor Who team's US location shooting has certainly paid off, lending these early scenes a grand scale that the series could scarcely have expected to achieve in 2005, let alone in 1963." Commenting on the future-Doctor's death, Jeffery said "seven minutes in, a nation's collective jaw dropped as The Doctor — this show's lead — is mercilessly gunned down. This plot twist is simply stunning, and it's difficult to imagine even casual viewers not sitting up to pay attention at this point." Jeffery also believed that the series regulars were on "top form," adding "the more abrasive aspects of Amy Pond's personality seem to have been toned down this year, and Karen Gillan responds with her best, most sympathetic performance to date. Arthur Darvill also lives up to his recent promotion to full-time companion. His comic timing is simply superb, but he excels too in the episode's darker moments." Jeffery rated the episode five stars out of five.

Gavin Fuller of The Daily Telegraph believed it was "a cracking start to the first part of the 2011 series, with the shocking ending of Amy seemingly shooting a girl making one keen wait for the conclusion next week to see how it all resolves itself," as well as enjoying the concept of the Silence. Rick Marshall of MTV believed that "Steven Moffat and the Doctor Who crew offer up yet another great episode," but also said the "big cliffhanger will likely cause more than a few fans' heads to explode." In addition, Marshall believed the alien antagonists "give the Weeping Angels a run for their money in scare factor." Simon Brew of Den of Geek thought the episode was "a triumphant return for Doctor Who, bubbling with confidence and throwing down story strands that hint at an engrossing series." Brew liked Sheppard's performance as Delaware and Darvill's increasing presence as Rory. Brew also complimented Haynes' work in the United States, saying it was an improvement from "Daleks in Manhattan", which featured British actors attempting to play with American accents. Tom Phillips of Metro said the 1969 US setting was "beautifully used," and enjoyed the "spookiness" of the Silence. However Phillips felt the episode would be "a bit hard to get into" for new viewers. Kevin O'Sullivan of The Sunday Mirror was more negative towards the episode, stating it was "impossible to understand," and for "strictly sci-fi nerds only," adding that Smith "remains a derivative Doctor who brings nothing new to the party."
