= Night and the Doctor =

- Doctor Who serial

Cast
- Doctor: Matt Smith (Eleventh Doctor)
- Companions: Karen Gillan (Amy Pond); Arthur Darvill (Rory Williams); Alex Kingston (River Song)
- Others: James Corden – Craig Owens; Daisy Haggard – Sophie

Production
- Directed by: Douglas Mackinnon
- Written by: Steven Moffat (1–4); Tom MacRae (5)
- Executive producers: Steven Moffat; Piers Wenger; Beth Willis
- Series: Series 6
- Running time: 5 episodes, 2–5 minutes each: 4 minutes (episode 1); 5 minutes (episode 2); 2 minutes (episodes 3 & 5); 3 minutes (episode 4)
- First broadcast: 21 November 2011

Chronology
← Preceded by "The God Complex"	Followed by → "Closing Time"

Night and the Doctor is a series of five made-for-DVD mini-episodes of Doctor Who which were written by Steven Moffat. They were released as bonus features in the Complete Sixth Series DVD and Blu-ray box sets in November 2011. The first four are narratively linked, centring on the question, "What does the Doctor do at night when his companions are asleep?" and take place in the console room of the TARDIS. The fifth one precedes the events of the episode "Closing Time". No cast or crew were credited for any of the five episodes except for writer Steven Moffat.

== Episodes ==
=== "Bad Night" ===
When Amy Pond (Karen Gillan) answers the TARDIS telephone in the middle of the night, she learns the Doctor carries on a very active social and adventuring life while his companions sleep. The Doctor (Matt Smith) then enters the TARDIS carrying a goldfish, whom he claims is actually a British Queen. Amy tries to piece together how the fate of the Commonwealth could possibly be affected by the Doctor, an unseen River Song, an unnamed Prince of Wales and the goldfish. She wants to have a serious conversation with the Doctor about her uneasy sleep, but the Doctor calls for her husband Rory (Arthur Darvill) to come deal with her emotions when he realises that he picked up the wrong goldfish.

=== "Good Night" ===
The Doctor returns from another night out with River Song. Amy, wide awake and sitting in her nightie on the stairs, catches him. She convinces him to tell her what he does while he's out at night, then tells him why she is finding it hard to sleep lately because her life doesn't make any sense. Due to the events of "The Big Bang", she can remember two versions of her life, one without her parents and one with. The Doctor comforts her and reminds her of the saddest moment of her life. It was at a fair when she dropped an ice cream. While recalling the event, she suddenly remembers a woman with red hair, dressed in a nightie, who gave her a new ice cream. When she finishes the anecdote, the Doctor is by the doors, ready to go with her to the fair.

=== "First Night" ===
River Song (Alex Kingston) is incarcerated in her cell on the first night after apparently killing the Doctor ("The Wedding of River Song") when she hears the TARDIS. The Doctor informs her that her parents, Amy and Rory, are asleep and he is taking her out to Calderon Beta where he intends to show her the sky on the starriest night in the entire history of the universe. The Doctor also tells her that she will easily be able to break out of the prison whenever she wishes, and explains that the diary he gave her in "Let's Kill Hitler" is to help keep track of their encounters. He shows her a dress he has chosen, but says there are more in the wardrobe down the corridor if she wants another. She hurries off to look while he pilots the TARDIS to their destination. While River is still in the wardrobe, the Doctor lands the TARDIS and hears laser-gunfire outside. He opens the door as a second River enters and collapses into his arms.

=== "Last Night" ===
Right before attempting mouth to mouth resuscitation, the Doctor finds that River is merely holding her breath, and had been chased by Sontarans. As he chastises her, she notices the gold dress he chose for their first visit to Caldoron Beta five years before, hanging near the console. This incarnation of River is wearing the vortex manipulator, placing the events after "The Pandorica Opens"/"The Big Bang" from her perspective. She demands to know whom he's brought, and storms up the stairs to find the hussy. An instant later, the first River returns from the TARDIS wardrobe, demanding to know whom the Doctor talking to; she returns to the wardrobe. The second River returns, demanding to know to whom the Doctor is speaking. When he denies talking to anyone, she resumes her hunt. A third River enters the TARDIS, actually wearing the gold dress. This version of River was expecting to meet the Doctor here, but on seeing an identical gold dress hung by the console, asks why he has bought another. The Doctor asks her to step outside to check if the light on top of the TARDIS is working.

The youngest River reappears, certain she has heard voices. The Doctor tells her he was talking to himself and she bustles off again. The second River returns to the control room, likewise convinced she heard the Doctor talking to someone. The Doctor brusquely activates her vortex manipulator to send her back to prison. The third River re-enters the TARDIS, followed by a second, older version of the Eleventh Doctor, who informs her that she is in the wrong TARDIS. As they are about to leave, she tells the younger Doctor that they are off to see the Singing Towers of Darillium. The two Doctors share a brief, sad moment, knowing such a trip would possibly be the most advanced (in total age) Doctor she would see before she dies in the Library ("Forest of the Dead") in the Tenth Doctor's presence.

As the older Doctor leaves, the youngest River returns to catch a glimpse of the Doctors together. She asks the younger Doctor about it but he refuses to tell her, using River's catchphrase, "Spoilers". River jokes that his secrets will be the death of her and walks past him. The Doctor pauses to have another sad moment before taking the youngest River on their date.

=== "Up All Night" ===
This episode is a prequel to "Closing Time" by Gareth Roberts, and shows the night spent by Craig Owens (James Corden) before the Doctor pays him a visit. Craig faces his fears of being a father and caring for young Alfie, while Sophie Benson (Daisy Haggard) prepares for her trip and the lights flicker ominously.

== Production ==
The first two episodes, "Good Night" and "Bad Night", were filmed over two days alongside the 2011 Comic Relief charity special "Space" and "Time". This also ties thematically with what happens to Amy during the fifth series and what is happening to her in the sixth series. For "Good Night", two "goldfish wranglers" were hired to take care of the goldfish.

== Release ==
Night and the Doctor was released on the Complete Sixth Series DVD and Blu-ray sets, released in the Region 2 on 21 November 2012 and in Region 1 on 22 November. In total they are about fourteen minutes long; "Good Night" is the longest at nearly five minutes, and "Up All Night" is the shortest at two minutes.

== Critical reception ==
Ian Berriman of SFX called the serial the "most exciting bonus". He referred to "Bad Night" as being an "inconsequential fare, but good fun", and said that "Good Night" was his favorite. However, Berriman wrote that "Up All Night" was "pointless" after watching "Closing Time". Charlie Jane Anders of io9 thought that the mini-episodes embodied "why we love Steven Moffat's clever-pants dialogue and rapid-fire storytelling". Anders also wrote that "Good Night" added "some much-needed character development for Amy" and that "First Night"/"Last Night" had "some absolutely lovely River Song moments". DVD Talk's John Sinnott named Night and the Doctor as his favourite extra on the DVDs, describing them as "clever and funny and a very welcome addition to the set". Teresa Jusino of Tor.com described the mini-episode as "a beautiful addition to Doctor Who canon" because they stripped the typical adventures to show that the programme was "a beautiful show about people and ideas". She called "Bad Night" the "funniest" and "Good Night" the "best". IGN reviewer Arnold T Blumburg called "Bad Night" "frivolous fluff" and "Up All Night" a "cute prequel". He felt that "Good Night" and "First Night"/"Last Night" had more emotion and "more information and logic than any of the aired episodes", although he noted that the latter had "a disproportionately large if predictable helping of juvenile sexual innuendo".
