= Doctor Who: The Eternity Clock =

2012 video game

- Box art
- Developer: Supermassive Games
- Publisher: BBC Worldwide
- Producer: Angela Hunt
- Writer: David Bryher
- Engine: Unreal Engine 3
- Platforms: Microsoft Windows, PlayStation 3, PlayStation Vita
- Release: PlayStation 3; 23 May 2012; PlayStation Vita; 10 October 2012; Microsoft Windows; 15 November 2012
- Genre: Action-adventure
- Modes: Single-player, multiplayer

Doctor Who: The Eternity Clock is a 2012 action-adventure video game developed by Supermassive Games and published by BBC Worldwide for the PlayStation 3. It was later ported to the PlayStation Vita and Microsoft Windows. Based on the BBC television series Doctor Who, it was intended to be the first of a series, but it was announced in 2013 that the sequels have been put on hold.

== Synopsis ==
=== Setting ===
The game primarily takes place within the Doctor's time-travelling TARDIS, the high-security Stormcage Containment Facility prison of the 52nd century, and locations within and under London across different time periods.

Chronologically, the game takes place at some point after the Eleventh Doctor's introduction in the Doctor Who series 5 episode "The Eleventh Hour", but before the Doctor Who series 6 finale episode, "The Wedding of River Song" (as his "death" within that episode is alluded to as still impending, in-game).

=== Characters ===
Matt Smith and Alex Kingston reprise their respective roles of the Eleventh Doctor and River Song. Players encounter iconic Doctor Who villains like Daleks, Cybermen, Silurians, and the Silence.

=== Plot ===
The Doctor and River Song travel across space and time in an effort to save Earth by gathering pieces of the Eternity Clock, an object that is a record of everything that has or will ever happen in all of existence.

== Development ==
The game had previously been confirmed for release on 30 April 2012, but was later postponed to 23 May 2012.

== Reception ==
According to review aggregating website Metacritic, the PS3 version of the game received an average review score of 39 out of 100, based on 21 reviews.

The game received a 3.5 out of 20 from the Australian game critics Stephanie Bendixsen and Gus Ronald on the Australian Broadcasting Corporation television program Good Game: Spawn Point, later describing what they truly wish a Doctor Who game would be like.

IGN editor Mike Bell gave The Eternity Clock a 5.5 out of 10 stating that "Doctor Who: The Eternity Clock is a game that is filled to the brim with good intentions and does a lot of things right, but that even the Pandorica couldn't fix the amount of technical issues present."

Developers have responded to some criticisms and released an update. This update addresses bugs, AI issues and adds additional save locations.
