= Church of the Papal Mainframe =

Fictional religious organisation from Doctor Who

The Church of the Papal Mainframe
- Doctor Who characters
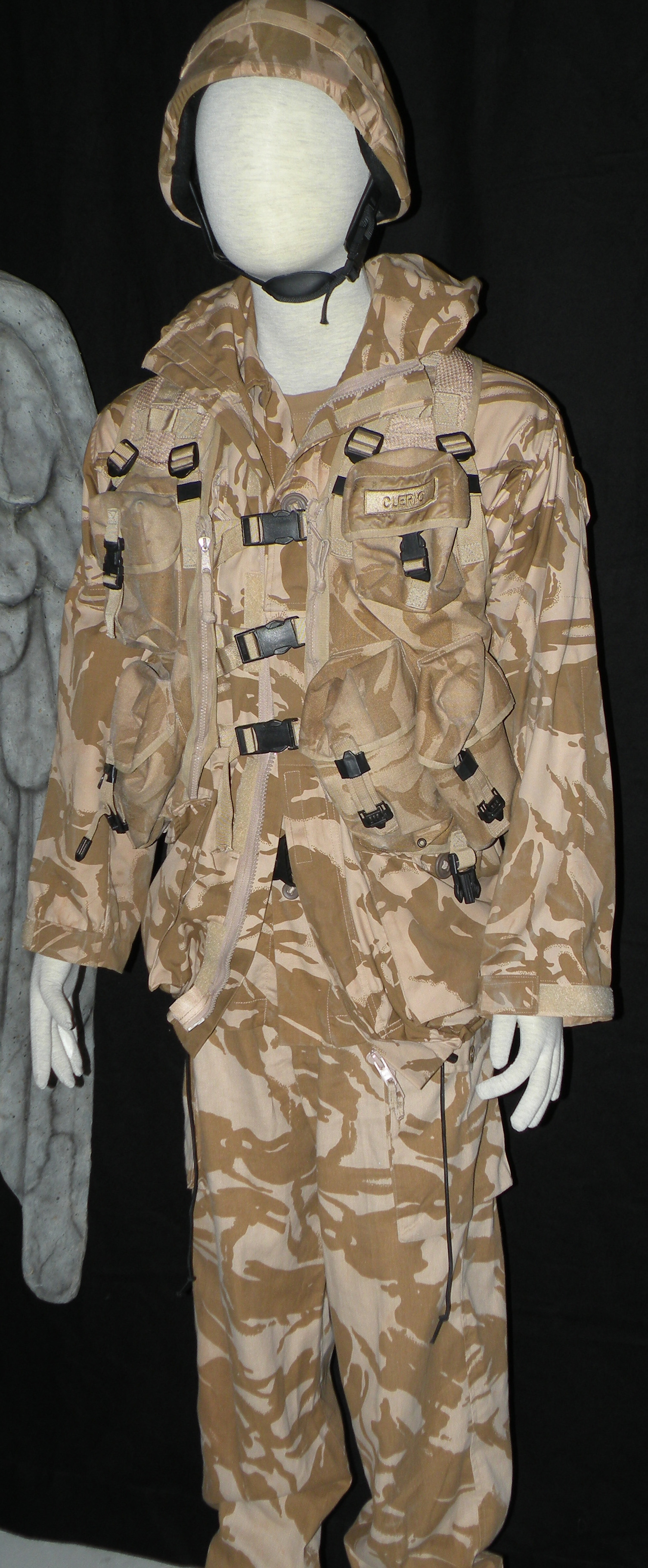
- A Cleric's uniform, on display at the Doctor Who Experience
- First appearance: "The Time of Angels"; 2010
- Created by: Steven Moffat

In-universe information
- Religion: Anglican

The Church of the Papal Mainframe, also known as the Church, is a fictional religious group in the British science-fiction television series Doctor Who. Members of the Church first appeared in the 2010 episodes "The Time of Angels" and "Flesh and Stone", with the Church serving as recurring characters throughout the show. In-universe, the Church is an interstellar, militant church hailing from the 51st century, acting as a "security hub" in the universe. Members of its army utilise religious terminology, with members being referred to as "Clerics", though other ranks exist. The Church has many different allies throughout the show, including the Silents, creatures that, in-universe, a viewer forgets once they look away from a Silent. A splinter group of the Church, dubbed the "Kovarian Chapter" or "The Silence", serve as recurring antagonists, aiming to kill the Eleventh Doctor.

Created by Steven Moffat, the Church has been analysed for its satire of the Church of England, as well as for its portrayal of religion, Anglicanism, and the Church of England's fate in the far future. The Silence's role within the series has also been analysed in relation to the Church.

== Television appearances ==
Doctor Who is a long-running British science-fiction television series that began in 1963. It stars its protagonist, The Doctor, an alien who travels through time and space in a ship known as the TARDIS, as well as their travelling companions. When the Doctor dies, they are able to undergo a process known as "regeneration", completely changing their appearance and personality. Throughout their travels, the Doctor often comes into conflict with various alien species and antagonists.

=== Background and characteristics ===
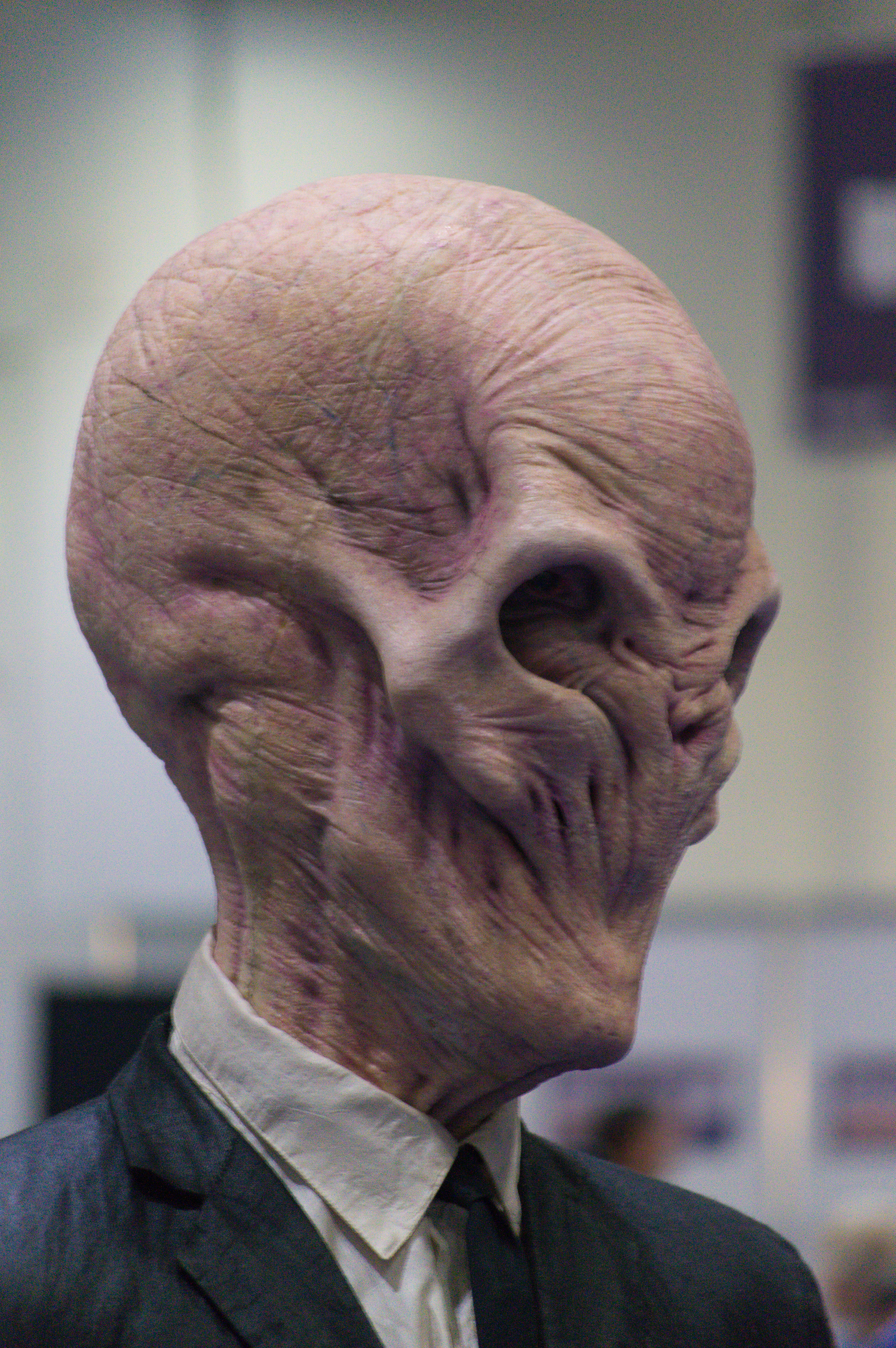
A Silent, as it appears on display at the Doctor Who Experience

The Church of the Papal Mainframe is an interstellar, militant church that hails from the 51st century. The Church acts akin to a "security hub", despite being a religious order, with the Church seeking to protect innocents. Unlike the pre-existing law body in Doctor Who's universe known as the Shadow Proclamation, the Church acts on its own accord, instead of needing ratification for any action to take place. Those who subscribe to the Church's religion are often given sacred names, such as "Bob", "Angelo", and "Christian". The Church identifies as being Anglican, indicating it is associated with the Church of England, and incorporates elements of Christianity. Its theological ideology within the series is unclear, leading to some interpretations that it is secular in nature.

The Church has a military branch, whose members are referred to as "Clerics", though many other ranks exist, such as bishop, verger, and the militaristic ranking of colonel; those in the military branch have also been referred to as "Anglican Marines". The Church also employs genetically engineered creatures known as Silents, who act as confessional priests. The Silents make people who look away from the Silence forget they were there, resulting in "memory-proof confessors". They are also allied with a group known as the Headless Monks—monks who have cut off their heads as they believe that they can "locate faith in the heart and doubt in the head". The Church is led by the character Tasha Lem, who has had past dealings with the Doctor and has a flirtatious relationship with him. The Church is additionally affiliated with the weapons company Villengard, who give supplies and medical aid only to those who believe in the Church's doctrine.

During the events of "The Time of the Doctor" (2013), the Eleventh Doctor ends up on the planet Trenzalore, where his people, the Time Lords—who are presently in a place outside of the universe—are beaming out a message, asking the Doctor to speak his true name to let them know it's safe to return to the universe. The Church realises that the Time Lords' return would inevitably cause another Time War, a devastating interstellar conflict that had previously been responsible for the Time Lords leaving the universe. The Doctor elects to stay on Trenzalore without speaking his name, as if he were to leave, the planet and its inhabitants would be destroyed by species seeking to stop the outbreak of a Time War. The Church undergoes an unscheduled change of faith, resolving themselves to keeping the Doctor's silence. At this point in time, a splinter group known as the "Kovarian Chapter", led by the character Madame Kovarian, breaks off from the Church, resulting in her forming a group known as the Silence, which seeks to use time travel to attempt to stop the Doctor from ever reaching Trenzalore in the first place.

=== In television ===
The Church first appears in the 2010 two part story "The Time of Angels" and "Flesh and Stone", where a group of Clerics aids the Doctor and his ally River Song's attempt to excavate a Weeping Angel from the wreckage of a spaceship. The Silence themselves attempt to destroy the Doctor's TARDIS during the events of "The Pandorica Opens" (2010), but inadvertently cause the universe to be destroyed, though the Doctor restores it.

The Silence later kidnap the daughter of the Doctor's companion, Amy Pond, raising Amy's daughter to become an assassin sent to kill the Doctor. The 2011 episode "A Good Man Goes to War" depicts the Doctor fighting the Silence's troops head-on, including a number of Clerics, though Kovarian is able to escape with Amy's daughter. This child is encountered in the 2011 episodes "The Impossible Astronaut" and "Day of the Moon" in 1960s America and has the ability to regenerate. She eventually ends up growing up alongside her parents under the alias of Mels. Mels, in the episode "Let's Kill Hitler", attempts to kill the Doctor, but, after being shot by Adolf Hitler, regenerates into a new body, which the Doctor recognizes as being that of River Song. River ends up saving his life by giving up all of her regeneration energy, before then departing to become an archaeologist. River is later kidnapped in the 2011 episode "Closing Time" and is forced to kill the Doctor in the subsequent episode, "The Wedding of River Song" (2011). The Doctor survives this attempt on his life, faking his death, resulting in the Silence thinking he is dead.

The 2013 episode "The Time of the Doctor" depicts the Doctor's arrival on Trenzalore and dealings with the Church. As the battle wages on in Trenzalore and the Kovarian Chapter splits off, an alien species known as the Daleks eradicate the Church and convert its members, including Tasha Lem, into mindless puppets that the Daleks can control. Tasha is able to break free from the Daleks' control, and her and other members of the Church, including many Silents, aid the Doctor in the last days of the siege taking place on the planet.

In the 2024 episode "Boom", a group of Clerics are stationed at the planet Kastarion 3, where they are seemingly fighting a war with the native Kastarions. The Fifteenth Doctor, after stepping on a landmine and being rendered unable to move, is able to deduce that the Kastarions do not exist; the Clerics are fighting a war against nothing. The only casualties being sustained are their own, who are killed by the technology supposedly being used against the Kastarions. The war was orchestrated by the weapons manufacturer Villengard, who instigated a "war" so the Clerics would buy weapons from them and Villengard could make a profit. The Doctor was able to disarm the landmine and expose Villengard's scheme, allowing the Clerics to stop fighting. The Clerics' re-appearance was stated by writer Steven Moffat to be because Moffat needed characters that could operate with that degree of faith that a monster they couldn’t see existed."

== Reception and analysis ==
The Church of the Papal Mainframe was widely considered a satire and interpretation of the real world Church of England.

The Church's role within the series has been considered a satire of the actual Church of England. Bleeding Cool's Adi Tantimedh described them as such, as instead of being portrayed as being progressive like the Church is commonly known, they are instead portrayed as "trigger-happy jerks... driven by fear and blind obedience." Marcus K Harmes, writing in the book Religion and Doctor Who: Time and Relative Dimensions in Faith, stated that the Church's depiction in the far future gave a highly positive interpretation of the Church's continued existence compared to other interpretations in science fiction media, showing it was still alive, but at the cost of its status as a religious institution due to typical clerical terms now being associated with a militarised Church.

Andrew Crome, writing in the Journal of Popular Television, states that the Church's role in the series is atypical of usual adaptations of religion in television, as usually shows adapting religion depict it under a secularist lens, while others depict it as succumbing to the changes of society, indicating its decline in contemporary British culture. Crome thus states that the Church's use depicts a futuristic nostalgia in the show's fictional universe, while out of universe, helps with the show's worldwide marketing, as the use of nostalgia aids in the idea of Doctor Who being "heritage television". Harmes, writing in the journal St. Mark's Review, stated that the series' depiction of Anglicanism was at odds with usual depictions in science fiction media and with prior depictions of the church set in the present day, with the Church of the Papal Mainframe notably being more progressive with its viewpoints via having a woman as its leader and several gay men present in its clergy. He stated that this progressive acceptance in the far future showed that, for the church to survive into the future, it has to address controversies regarding these topics in the present day.

Karma Waltonen, also writing in the book Religion and Doctor Who: Time and Relative Dimensions in Faith, stated that the Silence's corruption of usual religious belief within those who were members of the Church posed moral questions over whether their reprehensible actions were justified under self-defence, and whether or not those who follow a religion, knowing of the religion's end, should perform morally questionable actions to prevent that end. Harmes stated that the Silence led by Kovarian were inherently representative of apocalyptic doomsday groups, with the Doctor's lack of comprehension and failure to understand the Silence while reasoning with them only further reinforcing the group's own beliefs, which Harmes stated was emblematic of real-world cult leader David Koresh's cult. Writing for the book Doctor Who and Science: Essays on Ideas, Identities and Ideologies in the Series, Kristine Larsen cited Kovarian's relation to religion and faith to represent a corruption of traditional family values and sacred boundaries.
