= Closing Time (Doctor Who) =

223 – "Closing Time"
- Doctor Who episode
- The Doctor holds up a Cybermat. The creature was given a more high-tech redesign. The teeth were added to suggest it had once been an animal.

Cast
- Doctor: Matt Smith – Eleventh Doctor
- Companion: James Corden – Craig Owens
- Others: Karen Gillan – Amy Pond; Arthur Darvill – Rory Williams; Daisy Haggard – Sophie; Alex Kingston – River Song; Frances Barber – Madame Kovarian; Seroca Davis – Shona; Holli Dempsey – Kelly; Chris Obi - George; Lynda Baron – Val; Paul Kasey – Cyberman; Nicholas Briggs – Voice of the Cybermen; Greg James – Shopper (uncredited)

Production
- Directed by: Steve Hughes
- Written by: Gareth Roberts (Note: Steven Moffat wrote the final scene and was not credited.)
- Produced by: Denise Paul
- Executive producers: Steven Moffat; Piers Wenger; Beth Willis
- Music by: Murray Gold
- Production code: 2.12
- Series: Series 6
- Running time: 45 minutes
- First broadcast: 24 September 2011

Chronology
← Preceded by "The God Complex"	Followed by → "The Wedding of River Song"

"Closing Time" is the twelfth and penultimate episode of the sixth series of the British science fiction television programme Doctor Who, and was first broadcast on BBC One on 24 September 2011. It was written by Gareth Roberts and directed by Steve Hughes. It is a sequel to "The Lodger", an episode Roberts wrote for the previous series.

In the episode, alien time traveller the Doctor (Matt Smith) is going on a "farewell tour" before his impending death and visits his friend Craig Owens (James Corden) in present-day Colchester, who has a new baby son, Alfie. Though not initially intending to stay, the Doctor becomes intrigued by a Cybermen invasion at a local department store.

Roberts and showrunner Steven Moffat wanted to bring Craig back, having enjoyed "The Lodger" and Corden's performance. Though "Closing Time" was designed to be fun, with comedy built around the double act of Smith and Corden, it contains themes and an epilogue that lead into the finale. The episode marks the first appearance of the Cybermats in the revival of Doctor Who, and they were appropriately redesigned. Much of the episode was filmed in a department store and a private home in Cardiff at night, with shooting going early into the morning. "Closing Time" was watched by 6.93 million viewers in the UK and received generally positive reviews from critics; while the performances, comedy, and emotional moments were praised, many critics were not pleased with the usage of the Cybermen.

== Plot ==
=== Synopsis ===
The Eleventh Doctor is on a farewell tour of his friends and has only one day to go before his death. He stops by Craig, who is living with his girlfriend Sophie in a new home in present-day Colchester and is raising their baby, Alfie. Craig, struggling to care for Alfie alone while Sophie is away for the weekend, suspects the Doctor is investigating something alien. The Doctor prepares to leave, but he notices a strange electrical disturbance in the area and decides to investigate.

The Doctor takes a job at the department store to investigate the disturbances further, along with reports of missing employees. The Doctor and Craig enter a lift and find themselves teleported to a Cyberman spacecraft. The Doctor manages to reverse the teleporter and disable it. With Craig's help, the Doctor enters the store after hours and catches a Cybermat, which has been siphoning small amounts of energy to the spacecraft. The Doctor also encounters a malfunctioning Cyberman in the building's basement, and is curious how it arrived in the store. At Craig's, the Doctor reprograms the Cybermat to track down the Cybermen signal.

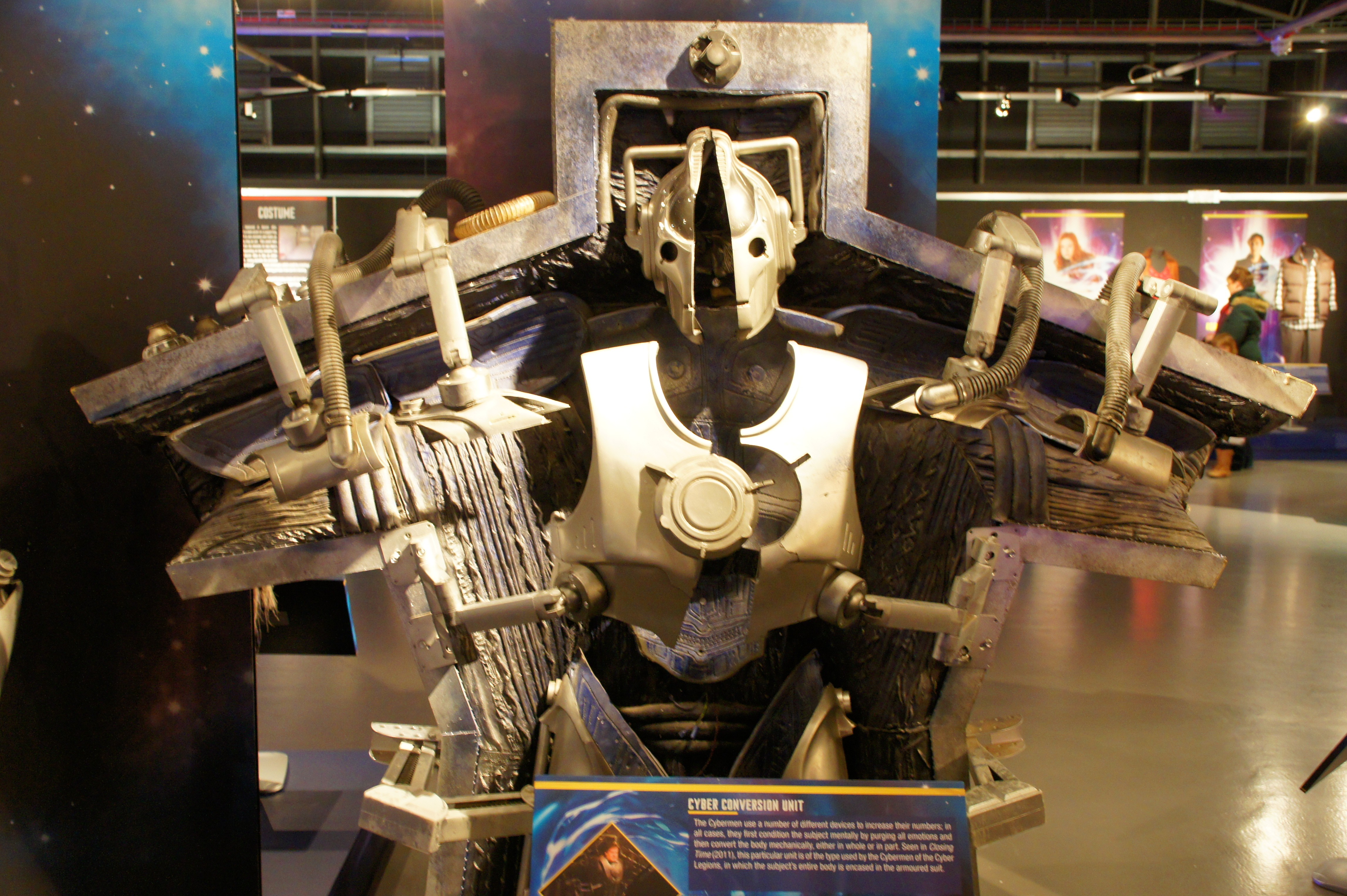
The Cybermen as they appear in this episode, as shown at the Doctor Who Experience.

The Doctor leaves on his own to locate the Cybermen at the store; Craig shortly follows, bringing Alfie along. The Doctor finds the spaceship actually sits below the store, underground, accessed from the changing room. With the siphoned energy, the Cybermen will soon have enough power to convert the human race. Craig, leaving Alfie at the store, follows the Doctor, and is captured and placed into a conversion machine to become the new leader of the Cybermen. Alfie's cries over the closed-circuit television echo in the ship. Craig, hearing Alfie, fights and reverses the conversion. The rest of the Cybermen painfully experience the emotions they have repressed from Craig's struggle, and their circuits start to overload. The Doctor and Craig escape via the teleporter as the ship explodes. The Doctor leaves in the TARDIS to face his death.

In the far future, River Song, recently made a Doctor of Archaeology, notes the date and location of the Doctor's death. She is interrupted by Madame Kovarian and agents of the Silence. Kovarian tells River that she is still theirs, and will be the one to kill the Doctor. Against River's will, they place her in an augmented astronaut's suit and submerge her in Lake Silencio in 2011 to await the Doctor.

=== Continuity ===
Two hundred years have passed for the Doctor since the events of "The God Complex", taking him to the age his older self was in "The Impossible Astronaut". He spent this time "waving through time" at Amy and Rory, which is seen at the beginning of "The Impossible Astronaut". The Doctor takes the blue envelopes he uses to summon his companions from Craig's flat and Craig gives him the Stetson he wears at the start of "The Impossible Astronaut". From River Song's perspective, the final scene takes place immediately before the picnic in "The Impossible Astronaut", and she is confirmed to have been that episode's eponymous astronaut.

Cybermats are shown for the first time in the revived series. In the classic series, they appeared in The Tomb of the Cybermen (1967), The Wheel in Space (1968), and Revenge of the Cybermen (1975). The Doctor examines a toy and remarks, "Robot dog; not as much fun as I remember," alluding to K-9, a robot dog who accompanied the Fourth Doctor. The Doctor claims to be able to "speak 'baby'", as he did in "A Good Man Goes to War". The Doctor expresses his dislike for Craig's "redecorated" house by using a line from the Second Doctor (Patrick Troughton) in The Three Doctors (1973) and "The Five Doctors" (1983). The Doctor recites the mini-poem "Not a rat, a cybermat" from the novelisation of Revenge of the Cybermen.

Amy has become a minor celebrity, appearing in an ad for Petrichor perfume, with the tagline, "For the girl who's tired of waiting." The concept of petrichor was used as a psychic password in "The Doctor's Wife" and means "the smell of dust after rain". The Doctor frequently refers to Amy as "the girl who waited". The perfume and tagline imply that the episode takes place after "The God Complex". This conflicts with the date on Craig's newspaper, 19 April 2011, which is three days before the Doctor's death at Lake Silencio.

== Production ==
=== Writing and casting ===
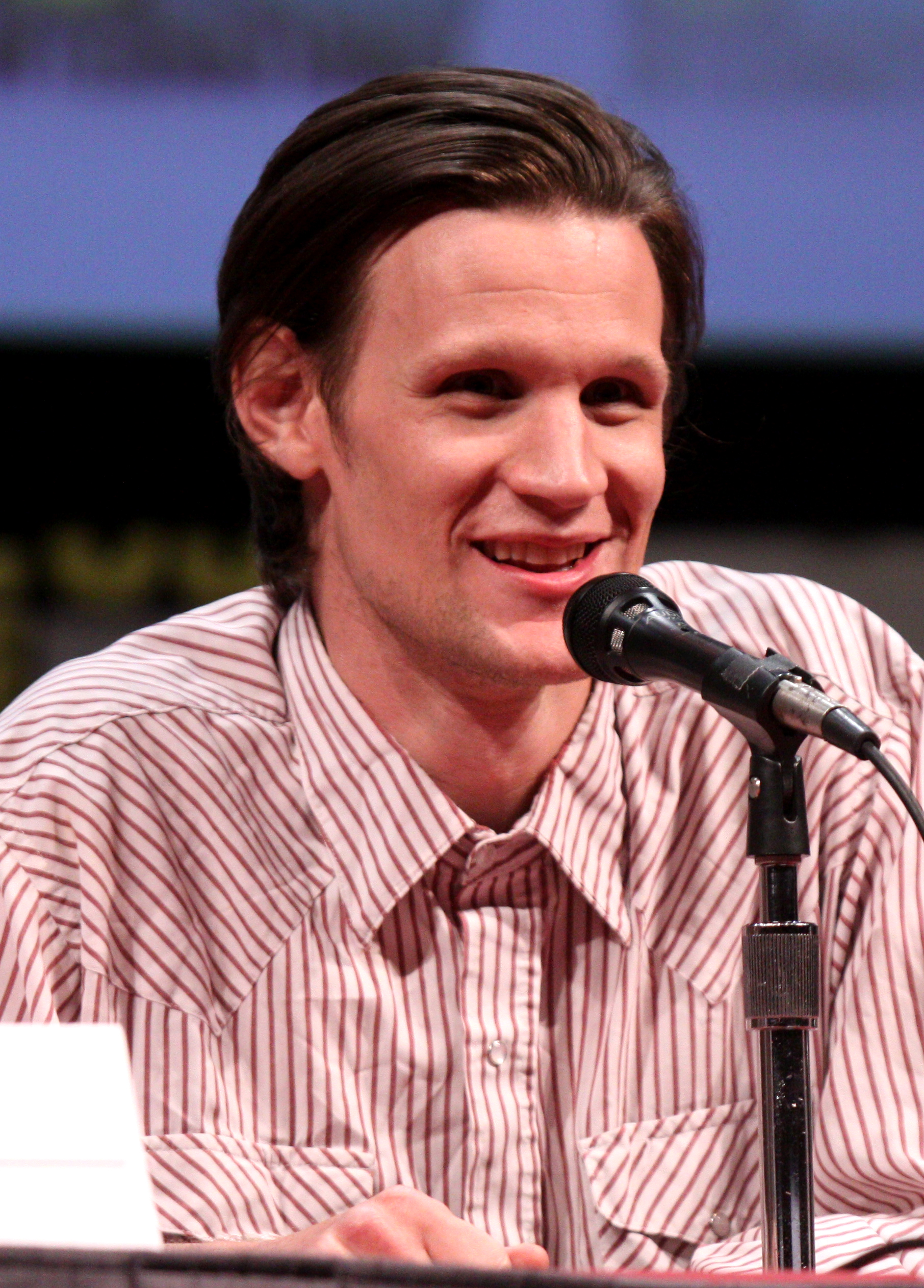

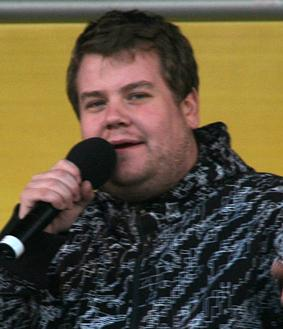
"Closing Time" is built around a double act with Matt Smith (top) and James Corden (bottom).

Writer Gareth Roberts said in an interview that he was considering bringing the character of Craig back when he saw James Corden's performance in "The Lodger", saying that "it already felt like he was one of the Who family". Showrunner Steven Moffat was pleased with "The Lodger", an episode he called "quite close to my heart", and wanted to bring Craig back. He commented that it was a change of pace for Corden, who usually was cast as "the funny one"; as Craig he is "the straight man to the wacky Doctor". Director Steve Hughes compared the Doctor and Craig to famous comedic duos such as Laurel and Hardy, Abbott and Costello, and Simon Pegg and Nick Frost. Though most of the episode is intended to be fun, it also sets the stage for the finale and the Doctor's upcoming death. The "serious" final scene, written by Moffat, concluded events in River's life that had been hinted since "Flesh and Stone". Other episode titles suggested by Roberts included "Everything Must Go", "The Last Adventure", and "Three Cybermen and a Baby". A prequel, entitled "Up All Night", is included as part of the Night and the Doctor series of mini-episodes in the Series 6 DVD package.

It was also Roberts' idea to bring back the Cybermen, because there were no other returning monsters in the series and he thought "there should be a sense of history about the Doctor's final battle to save Earth before he heads off to meet his death". He felt that this was consistent with the theme of "death and lingering darkness" that had run throughout the sixth series. Roberts wanted the audience to think that maybe Craig would really be converted. Moffat felt the "blowing the Cybermen up with love" conclusion was the Doctor Who version of a father bonding with his son. Roberts felt that the episode's depiction of the Cybermen put it on the "silly/terrifying axis" that was common in Doctor Who.

Daisy Haggard's reduced role as Sophie in the episode was due to her role in the play Becky Shaw at Almeida Theatre in London. This episode marks Lynda Baron's third involvement with Doctor Who, having provided vocals for the "Ballad of the Last Chance Saloon", heard in The Gunfighters (1966), and the role of Wrack in Enlightenment (1983). The accompanying Doctor Who Confidential to "Closing Time" is entitled "Open All Hours" in honour of Baron's role in the sitcom of the same name. Radio 1 DJ Greg James appears in a non-speaking cameo role, as a man shopping for lingerie. His character was nicknamed "Carlos". Alfie was portrayed by seven different babies, usually paired in twins, because of strict rules about baby hours. Several dummies were used as well. Corden, who was about to become a father, learned tips from the mothers.

=== Filming and effects ===
Much of "Closing Time" was filmed in Howells department store in Cardiff. As the store had to be closed, they filmed over four or five nights, sometimes going until 6:00 in the morning. Hughes said it was a "drain" on the production team, while Corden recalled it made the cast and crew "lightheaded" and "hysterical". Reportedly, the department store scenes were shot in March 2011. The rest of the episode was filmed in a private home in Cardiff; the couple who owned the house allowed the filming to take place in order for it to be an experience for their two young boys. Production at the house also went into the early hours of the morning. The window of the sliding door in the house that the Doctor jumps through to save Craig from the Cybermat was too small, so the production team built another one. The new door was too big for shatterglass; instead, glass that breaks into chunks was used, wired with a small explosive that would crack the glass when Matt Smith's stuntman jumped through it. Hughes wanted it to look as if the audience was crashing through the window with the Doctor; he spliced together shots of Smith filmed running up to the door, the stuntman jumping through it, and Smith landing with shards of glass thrown over him.

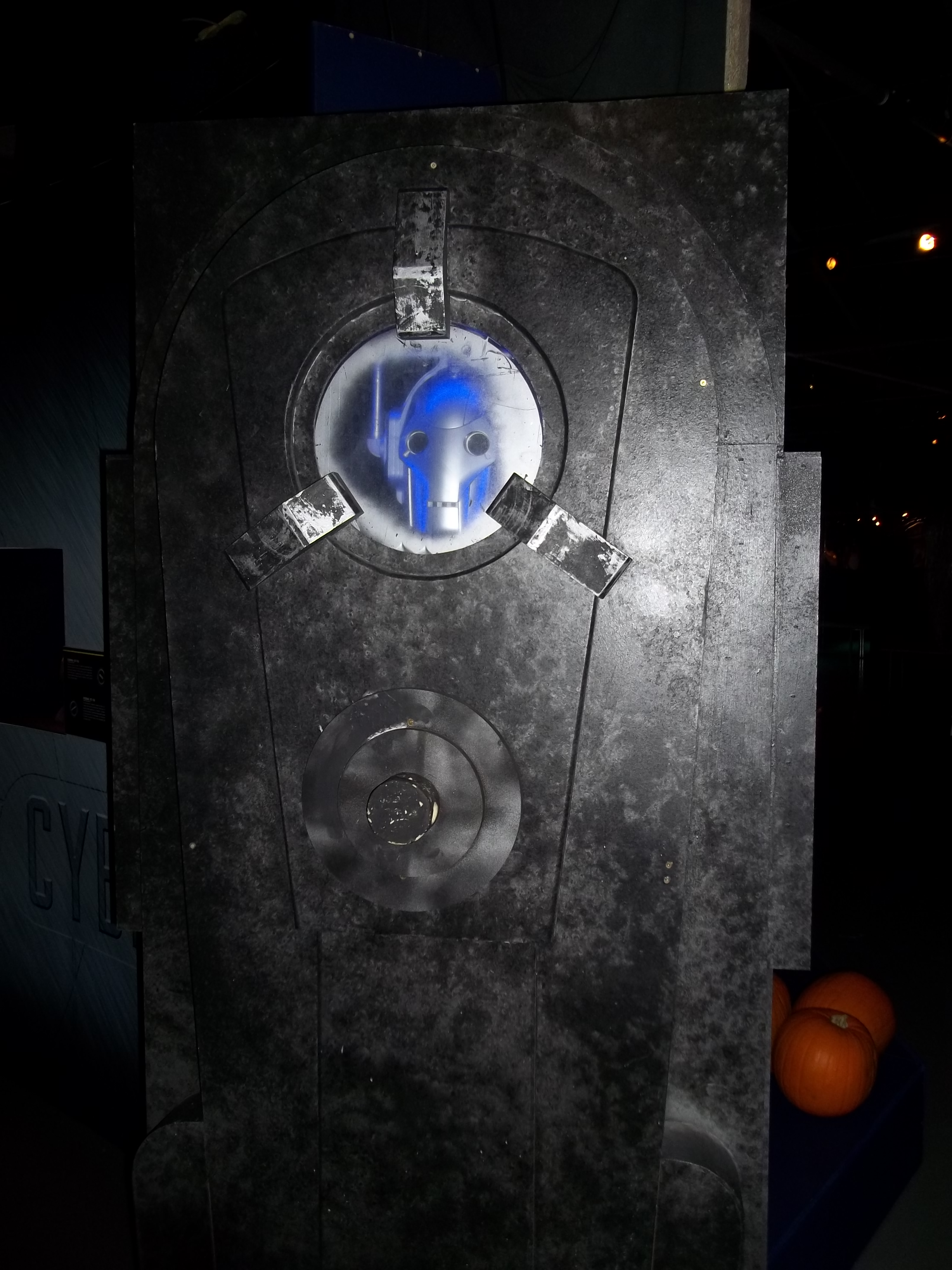
Cyberman in stasis as shown in the episode, on display at the Doctor Who Experience.

The Cybus Industries logo, which had been used on the Cybermen since their redesign for the revived series in "Rise of the Cybermen"/"The Age of Steel" (2006), was covered up for the Cybermen in this episode as well as the ones which had previously appeared in "A Good Man Goes to War". This is because the Cybermen from "Rise of the Cybermen" originated from a parallel universe, while the prime universe has its own Cybermen from the planet Mondas, as seen in the classic series. As the Cybermen that feature in "Closing Time" were barely surviving, the production team made them look broken down and as if they had been cannibalising parts to survive. The suits were already worn to an extent, as they had been used so often in the five years since they were made. The Cyber Controller conversion equipment was built around Corden.

The Cybermats, which had not been seen on screen since 1975's Revenge of the Cybermen, were redesigned to appear more high-tech. The top was designed to recall the head of a Cyberman, and piranha-like teeth were added to suggest that they were converted animals, just as Cybermen were converted humans. Three versions of the Cybermat were made. The first was simply a "stunt double" which did not have teeth and was meant for being thrown around or laid still. The second was a cable-controlled "close-up" version that had teeth and thrashed, and was used for when the characters handled it. Smith broke this one when he hit it with a frying pan in the scene where Craig is being attacked, and it was subsequently repaired with tape. The third was radio-controlled to dash along the floor. The post-production special effects team The Mill created a computer-generated Cybermat that leapt up to attack Craig.

== Broadcast and reception ==
"Closing Time" was first broadcast in the United Kingdom on BBC One on 24 September 2011, and in the United States on BBC America. It achieved overnight ratings of 5.3 million viewers, coming in second for its time slot behind All-Star Family Fortunes. When final consolidated figures were taken into account, the number rose to 6.93 million, making it the second most watched programme of the day behind The X Factor. "Closing Time" was the fifth most-downloaded programme of September on BBC's online iPlayer. It was also given an Appreciation Index of 86, considered "excellent".

=== Critical reception ===
The episode received generally positive reviews, with critics praising the comic interplay between Smith and Corden. Dan Martin of The Guardian questioned the decision to air a standalone episode as the penultimate show of the series, calling "Closing Time" "something of a curiosity" as well as writing positively about Smith and Corden's "Laurel and Hardy act". However, he felt that the Cybermen had been deprived of their menace. Martin later rated it the eighth best episode of the series, though the finale was not included in the list. Gavin Fuller of The Daily Telegraph awarded the episode three out of five stars, comparing Smith's performance favourably to that of Patrick Troughton. Neela Debnath of The Independent said it was an "intriguing change of pace" and succeeded with "great comedic moments" and the "brilliant chemistry between the Doctor and Craig". She praised Corden for excelling after his "average" performance in "The Lodger".

Patrick Mulkern, writing for Radio Times, thought that the ending was an "emotional overload...but what better way to deal with the emotionally deprived Cybermen?" He was pleased with the "sweet cameo" from Amy and Rory and the "tense coda" with River Song and Kovarian. Keith Phipps of The A.V. Club gave "Closing Time" a grade of "B+", feeling that the episode was more about small character moments than the Cybermen plot. Though he wrote it was not as strong as "The Lodger", he praised the way it gave a break before the season finale to bring out the softer side of the Doctor. Digital Spy's Morgan Jeffery praised Smith, Corden, and Lynda Baron as Val, and felt that it was a "relief" to have a fun episode after two emotional heavy ones. However, he did not think it was as good as "The Lodger" and thought the Cybermen were "wasted", citing the conclusion of Craig blowing them up with love as "unsatisfactory". Andrew Blair of Den of Geek defended the Cybermen in the episode, opining that the episode brought out the tragedy of them barely surviving and having to convert people mechanically without any emotional understanding of the situation.

IGN's Matt Risley rated the episode 7.5 out of 10, praising the chemistry between Smith and Corden as well as Smith's interaction with the baby, but was disappointed with the Cybermen, who he said "never really delivered on the threat or horror fans know they're capable of". SFX magazine reviewer Rob Power gave the episode three and a half out of five stars, saying it "[worked] wonders" as a light-hearted episode before the finale and with "properly bad" Cybermen. Though he thought the Cyberman lacked "real menace" and Craig escaped in a "cheesy way", he considered the main focus to be on the Doctor's "farewell tour" and praised Smith's performance. He thought that the moments of "sad-eyed loneliness and resignation" added weight to "what would otherwise have been a paper-thin episode". Power also praised the ending for bringing things together for the finale, though he thought the final scene with River Song felt "a little tacked-on". Charlie Jane Anders writing for io9 described it as a "worthy sequel" and "welcome shot of comedy" and was positive towards the "sweet" exploration of the Doctor's self-loathing that proved the universe needed him. However, Anders was bothered by the running joke of the Doctor and Craig being mistaken for a gay couple and the stereotypes the episode relied on, such as the "clueless dad" and the ignorant shop girls. Christopher Hooton of Metro found the episode to be "soppy" and "sickly sweet", criticising Corden for his "whooping", "annoying" performance, the reliance on "slapstick capers" that "lurched a bit too close to the CBBC end of the spectrum" and the "jaunty [and] smug" soundtrack.
