= Silent (Doctor Who) =

Fictional religious order from Doctor Who

- Doctor Who race
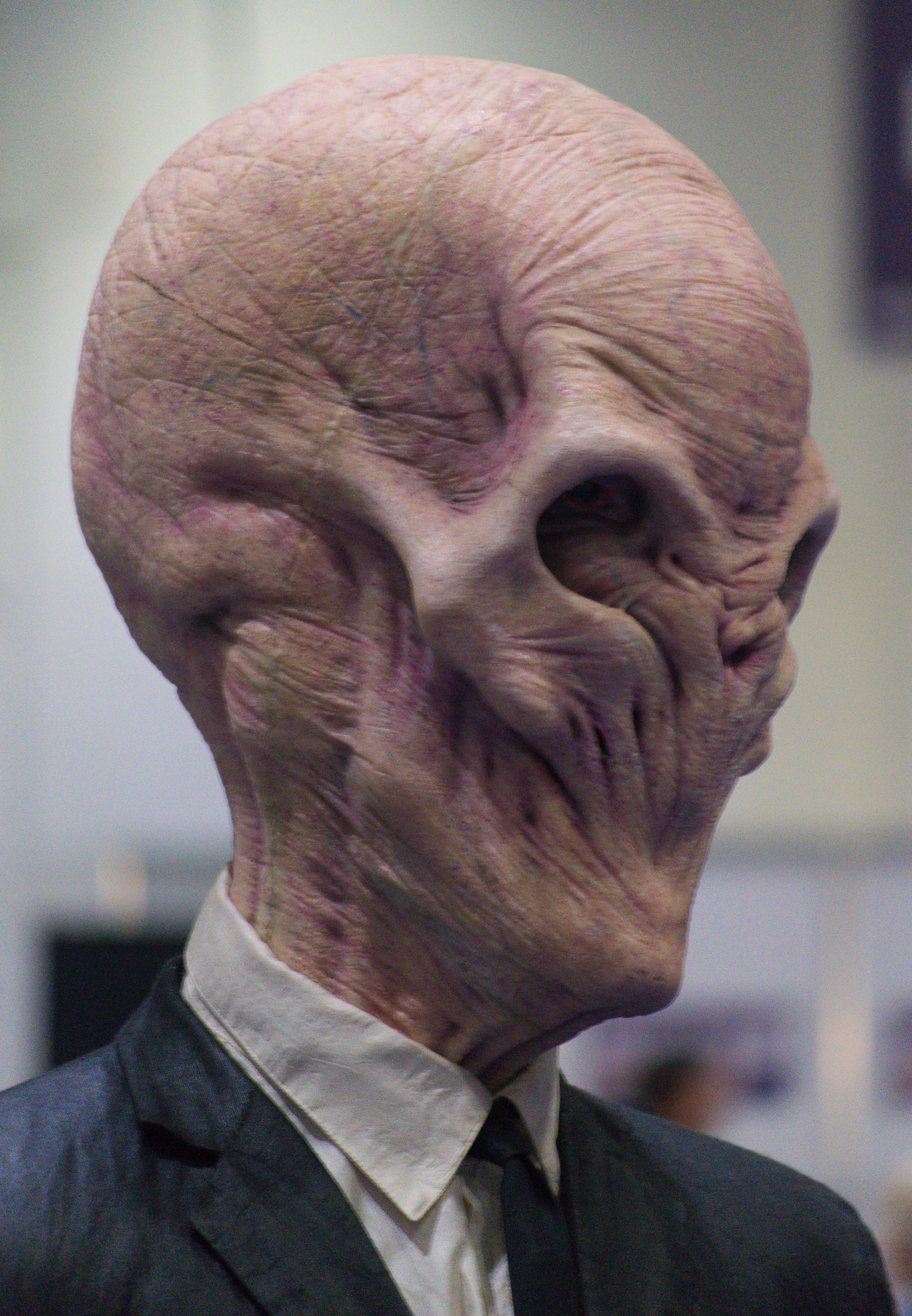
- A Silent costume as displayed at the Doctor Who Experience in 2013
- First appearance: "The Impossible Astronaut" (2011)
- Created by: Steven Moffat

In-universe information
- Affiliation: The Silence; The Church of the Papal Mainframe

The Silents are a race of aliens in the British science fiction television programme Doctor Who, created by then-showrunner Steven Moffat. They are a humanoid species whose design draws inspiration from Edvard Munch's 1893 expressionist painting The Scream as well as the urban legend of the "men in black." In-universe, those who turn away from a Silent after seeing them will forget they ever saw the Silent; Silents use this ability to act undetected and manipulate others using post-hypnotic suggestion. Silents are members of the religious order known as the Church of the Papal Mainframe, being genetically engineered by the Church to serve as confessional priests, with their memory erasing abilities incorporated so that confessors forget they ever confessed in the first place. Many Silents are members of the organisation known as the Silence, a splinter group of the Church dedicated to killing the show's protagonist, the Doctor. Though the phrase "Silence will fall" recurred throughout the 2010 series of Doctor Who, the Silence were not seen until the 2011 series' opener "The Impossible Astronaut", with their origins and goals not fully revealed until the 2013 special "The Time of the Doctor".

The Silents were met with a positive response from critics, being described as effective and scary antagonists, though some were concerned if the species was too terrifying for child audiences. The Silents have been analysed for their ability to convey fear, as well as in their relationship with the series' protagonist, The Doctor.

== Creation and description ==
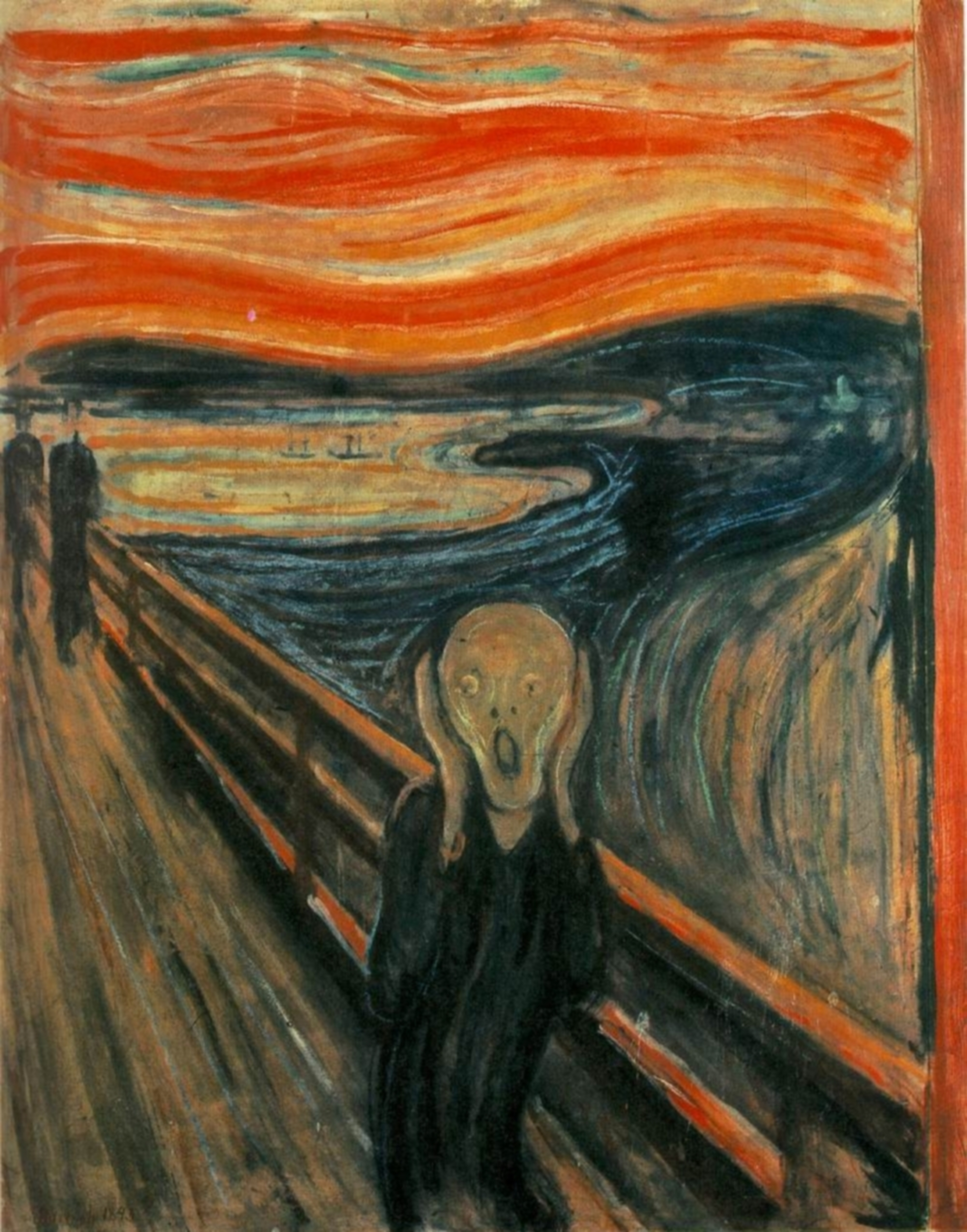
The Silents' appearance was partially based on Edvard Munch's 1893 painting The Scream.

=== Creation ===
Doctor Who is a long-running British science-fiction television series that began in 1963. It stars its protagonist, The Doctor, an alien who travels through time and space in a ship known as the TARDIS, as well as their travelling companions. When the Doctor dies, they are able to undergo a process known as "regeneration", completely changing the Doctor's appearance and personality. Throughout their travels, the Doctor often comes into conflict with various alien species and antagonists.

Producer Steven Moffat created the Silents. The Silents' creation was inspired by Edvard Munch's 1893 painting The Scream, the mythological figures known as "men in black", and the concept of grey aliens.

Neill Gorton, a creature designer at studio Millenium FX, was involved with the Silents' design. The Silents were described as "looming" over characters in the script of their first appearance, with Gorton thus making them to be very tall. The Silents' very first mock-up design was quickly accepted by the show's producers, which Gorton attributed to be due to the script's detail allowing everyone to have a similar mental image. The Silents are portrayed via prosthetics, which were created by Gorton. The prosthetic head used left the actors practically blind, requiring assistance to have them move between scenes. Two different Silent heads were produced: one featuring the mouth closed, and one featuring it open; computer-generated imagery was used for transitions between the open and closed mouth.

=== Description ===
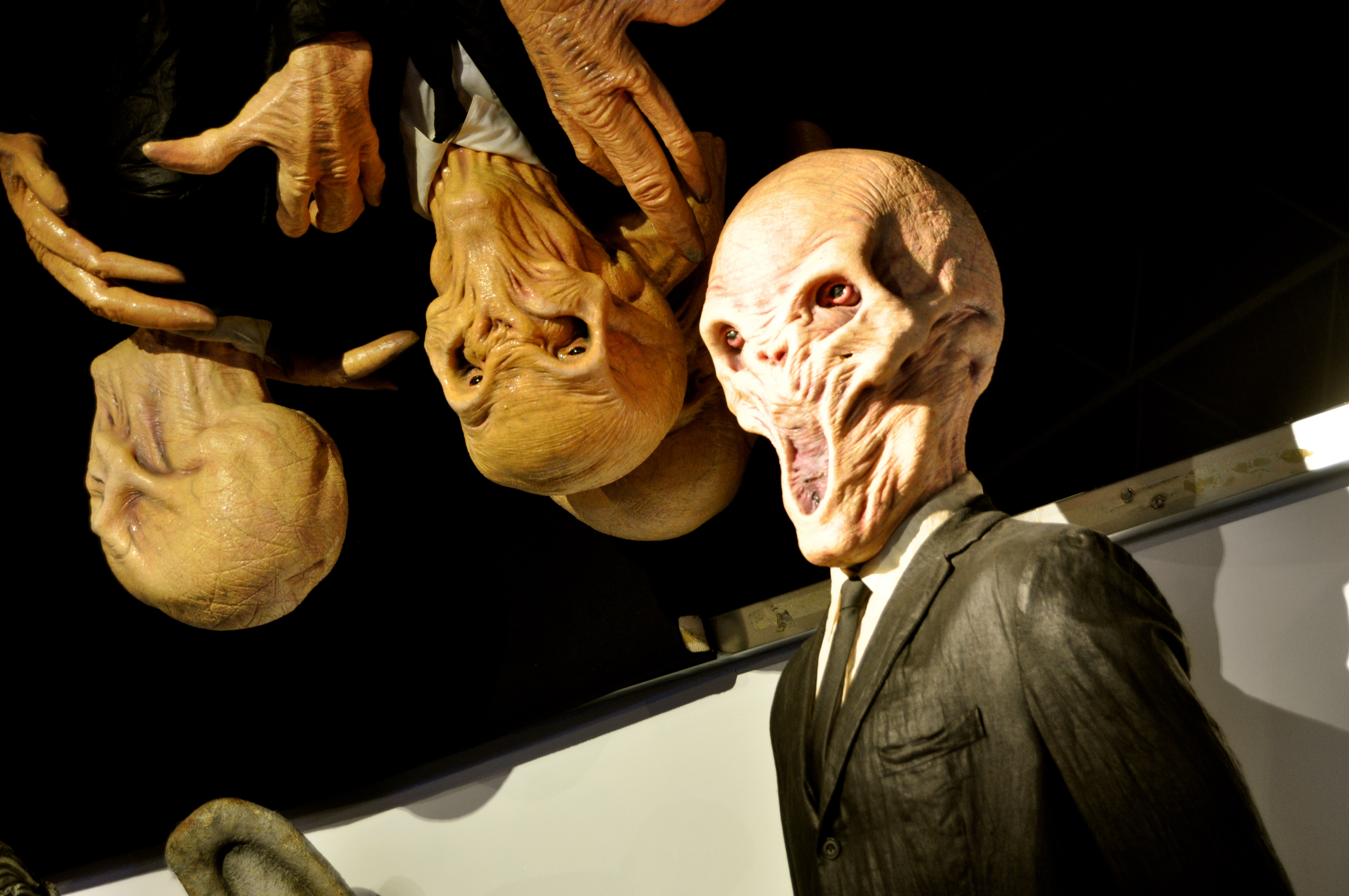
A group of Silents hanging from the ceiling (left) and a Silent with its mouth open (right)

The Silence are a collective group, with individuals being a "Silent". The Silents are also sometimes interchangeably referred to both by the name of the organisation and their species name. The Silents shown in "The Impossible Astronaut" are depicted as tall humanoids with bulbous heads and mouthless, bony faces. Their eyes are sunken within their sockets and the skin of their cheeks stretches to the point of their narrow chins. Their large, shrivelled hands resemble a human hand except where the ring and middle fingers would be is a large flipper-like finger. They speak in low, guttural voices though they have no apparent mouths. The four-fingered hands of the Silents, with one finger much longer than the other, were inspired by the aye-aye lemur.

The Silents are perceived only while being viewed, and they are instantly forgotten once a viewer looks away. To keep track of their encounters with the Silents, Doctor Who's characters mark tallies on their bodies for each Silent they see, though a recording device has also been used to record encounters with the species. The Silents have the ability to use post-hypnotic suggestion, which enables them to manipulate humanity into creating technology they need. Silents can also hang up-side down from the ceiling, and were able to reverse-engineer their own TARDIS, a time machine, which resembles a device previously seen in the episode "The Lodger" (2010).

== Appearances ==
The unexplained phrase "Silence will fall" recurs throughout the fifth series (2010) of Doctor Who. The plot thread is left open in the series finale, "The Big Bang", where the Silence are responsible for the destruction of the Doctor's TARDIS.

The Silence are physically introduced in the sixth series' two-part premiere "The Impossible Astronaut"/"Day of the Moon" (2011) where the Eleventh Doctor is seemingly killed by a mysterious figure wearing an astronaut suit. A version of the Eleventh Doctor from hundreds of years in the past joins his companions who have just witnessed the Doctor's death. They encounter several Silents, who have been manipulating humanity behind the scenes, pushing them towards technological advances, including the spacesuits used in the Apollo 11 moon landing. The Doctor is able to place footage of a Silent goading humanity into exterminating their kind into the Apollo 11 footage, with the Silence's post-hypnotic suggestion conditioning Earth's populace into exterminating the Silents for generations to come without memory of having done so.

The Doctor's companion River Song is revealed to be the infant daughter of two of the Doctor's other companions, Amy Pond and Rory Williams. The Silence kidnapped River as an infant and raised her as an assassin to kill the Doctor, though River rebels against her programming and chooses to ally with the Doctor instead. However, the Silence force her to don the astronaut suit in "Closing Time" (2011), becoming the figure who had previously killed the Doctor. She subsequently stops herself from shooting the Doctor in "The Wedding of River Song" (2011); River not shooting the Doctor creates a parallel universe, populated by many members of the Silents. The Silents attack the Doctor and his companions, but the Doctor and River making physical contact causes the parallel universe to be destroyed, and the Doctor is able to fake his death, thwarting the Silence.

The Silence's origins, and their reason for wanting the Doctor killed, are revealed in "The Time of the Doctor" (2013). The Silents are genetically modified priests belonging to the Church of the Papal Mainframe, a religious organisation; penitents would confess their sins and then forget their confessed sins immediately after giving them. During the story's events, many of the Doctor's enemies laid siege to the planet Trenzalore in an attempt to kill the Doctor. The Church attempted peacekeeping measures during this time; despite this, a group known as the "Kovarian Chapter" split-off from the Church, becoming the group that attempted to kill the Doctor in prior episodes, done to prevent him from ever reaching Trenzalore. The remaining Silents ally with the Doctor and help him defend the planet from invading forces.

The Silence additionally appear in the spin-off video games The Gunpowder Plot and The Eternity Clock. They make several appearances in audio series made by Big Finish Productions. Two episodes of the fourth Classic Doctors, New Monsters box set Broken Memories focus on a Silent novitiate who has been stationed at a crime-rampant city and becomes a friend and confidante of the Eighth Doctor. Trying to resolve the gang warfare in audio drama "The Silent Priest", the novitiate is forced to kill a local crimelord to protect the Doctor, causing him to quit the Church in disgrace. By "The Silent City", the former novitiate has become a casino manager who uses his abilities to manipulate the wealthy into deliberately losing massive amounts of money, which are then donated to the poor. Other Silents from the church eventually track down and kill this Silent. The UNIT anthology Silenced deals with the Silence's efforts to undo humankind's post-hypnotic suggestion to kill them so that the Silents can escape Earth, while attempting to cause anarchy through a puppet Prime Minister. The story "The Howling Wolves of Xan-Phear" focuses on time-travelling assassin Doom, who is sent to kill the Silent Chu'Lac, who acts as the secret ruler of the planet Xan-Phear.

== Reception ==
=== Critical reception ===
The Silents were immediately the subject of debate following their debut, with viewers arguing about whether or not the monsters were too scary for child viewers of the series. Pete May, writing about whether the series had become too scary for family audiences in The Guardian, cited the Silents, alongside previous creations such as the Weeping Angels and the cracks in time prominent in the show's fifth series, as being examples of the series preying on the fears and insecurities of child viewers to generate fear within its audience; May additionally cited the Silents as being too complicated, believing older, simpler monsters were something the series should strive for instead. Michael Hann, discussing the Silents in the same article, stated that the species allowed children to learn and experience fear in a safe environment where the series' protagonists could defeat the threat. In response to the concerns about the Silents' effect on child audiences, Moffat responded by saying, "I emphatically think that's not the case ... children like to be scared—like on a ghost train or a rollercoaster."

The Guardian's Dan Martin responded favourably to the Silents. Though he described them as "a standard Moffat psychological trick", he commended it as the "most refined to date" and praised an introductory scene that was reminiscent of the unsettling directorial work of David Lynch. The A.V. Club's Keith Phipps wrote favourably of Moffat's handling of the species in "Day of the Moon", in particular highlighting the usage of tallies in detecting the Silents, although Phipps reflected that he was confused by the montage that connected the Silence to other mentions of "silence" in previous episodes. Patrick Mulkern, in a review for Radio Times, highlighted the Silents as "simple but effective", highlighting their concept and several scenes in their debut episode as being among the most tense in the series.

=== Analysis ===
Graham Sleight, writing in the book The Doctor's Monsters: Meanings of the Monstrous in Doctor Who, stated that the Silents were creatures not only specifically designed to frighten child viewers of the series, but also existed as a concept that could plausibly exist in real life; they are scary to children as they might be real, as a child may have encountered one, and simply have forgotten it. The book The Inner World of Doctor Who highlighted the Silents, alongside the Weeping Angels, as being examples of the "uncanny" within the series, with both aliens utilizing the concepts of "knowing" and "not knowing" to be scary to the show's audience. The book The Science of Doctor Who compared the species to the aliens encountered in Stanley Kubrick's 2001: A Space Odyssey, stating that both fulfilled the concept of an "elusive alien" that manipulated humanity throughout its history.

Justin Andress of Inverse praised the Silents' design and concept. He compared it favorably in comparison to creepypasta character Slender Man, a similar character in terms of physical design, in that unlike Slender Man, the Silents proved to be terrifying antagonists due to their status as an ever-present species that was always watching. The book Doctor Who: A British Alien? analyzed the Doctor's genocide of the Silents in their debut story, arguing that the Doctor did not give explicit evidence of the Silents' crimes and was not justified in killing them. The book argued that this, alongside other similar genocides by the character that were devoid of any criticism towards the character's morally dubious actions, were incidents not justified within the series' narrative.
