= The Time of the Doctor =

241 – "The Time of the Doctor"
- Doctor Who episode
- Promotional poster

Cast
- Doctor: Matt Smith – Eleventh Doctor
- Companion: Jenna Coleman – Clara Oswald
- Others: Orla Brady – Tasha Lem; James Buller – Dad; Elizabeth Rider – Linda; Sheila Reid – Gran; Mark Brighton – Colonel Albero; Rob Jarvis – Abramal; Tessa Peake-Jones – Marta; Jack Hollington – Barnable; Sonita Henry – Colonel Meme; Kayvan Novak – Voice of Handles; Tom Gibbons – Young Man; Ken Bones – Voice; Aidan Cook – Cyberman; Nicholas Briggs – Voice of the Daleks & Cybermen; Barnaby Edwards, Nicholas Pegg – Daleks; Ross Mullan – Silent; Dan Starkey – Sontaran; Sarah Madison – Weeping Angel; Karen Gillan – Amy Pond; Peter Capaldi – Twelfth Doctor; Daz Parker – Cyberman (uncredited)

Production
- Directed by: Jamie Payne
- Written by: Steven Moffat
- Produced by: Marcus Wilson
- Executive producers: Steven Moffat; Brian Minchin
- Music by: Murray Gold
- Series: 2013 specials
- Running time: 60 minutes
- First broadcast: 25 December 2013

Chronology
← Preceded by "The Day of the Doctor"	Followed by → "Deep Breath"

"The Time of the Doctor" is an episode of the British science fiction television programme Doctor Who, written by Steven Moffat and directed by Jamie Payne, and was broadcast as the ninth Doctor Who Christmas special on 25 December 2013 on BBC One. It is Matt Smith's fourth Christmas special and his final regular appearance as the Eleventh Doctor and the first full appearance of Peter Capaldi as the Twelfth Doctor following his brief cameo in the previous episode "The Day of the Doctor".

The episode also features Jenna Coleman as the Doctor's companion Clara Oswald, plus several enemies of the Doctor, including the Daleks, Cybermen, Silence and Weeping Angels. The episode addresses numerous plot threads developed over the course of Smith's tenure, while also dealing with the regeneration limit established in the 1976 serial The Deadly Assassin.

"The Time of the Doctor" was the most-watched episode of the show in the United States, and obtained a 30.7% viewer share in the UK. It received positive reviews from critics, many of whom called the episode "great". Smith was particularly lauded, and his exit was characterised as graceful and beautiful.

== Plot ==
Thousands of aliens orbit the planet Trenzalore, from which a message, "Doctor who?", is continually being broadcast across time and space. The Church of the Papal Mainframe constructs a force field around Trenzalore. The Eleventh Doctor and Clara are offered the opportunity to explore to find the source of the message on the planet by the church's head, Tasha Lem.

They discover the message is coming from a human settlement called Christmas. The message originates from a crack in reality in the clock tower and is being sent by the Doctor's people: the Time Lords. The Doctor deduces the Time Lords are trying to escape the pocket universe they are in and want the Doctor to announce his real name as a sign that it is safe to emerge. A stalemate is in place; the other aliens cannot attack at the risk of the Doctor letting the Time Lords out, while the Doctor cannot risk abandoning Trenzalore as most of the forces in orbit will burn it to stop the Time Lords' return.

Wanting to protect her, The Doctor tricks Clara into being returned to Earth. Clara, however, jumps onto the TARDIS before it returns to the Doctor, causing it to arrive 300 years later. The Doctor reveals to her that his body has no further regenerations left, and that he is prepared to die defending Trenzalore. The two discover that in the intervening time, the Papal Mainframe have renamed themselves the Church of the Silence, and that a chapter of the Silence broke off to try to interfere with the Doctor's life, which includes them unwittingly creating the crack in the tower. After rescuing Tasha Lem from the Daleks, the Doctor tricks Clara again into being returned to Earth. As even more centuries pass, the Daleks remain the only aggressors against the Doctor and the dwindling forces of the Silence. Tasha eventually brings Clara back to Trenzalore as the siege finally comes to a conclusion. The Doctor is dying of old age and cannot stop the Daleks' attack. After saying goodbye to Clara, he goes out to the top of the tower to face his enemies.

Clara speaks to the Time Lords through the crack, begging them to help the Doctor. The crack in the tower closes and reappears in the night sky. Regeneration energy flows from the crack and into the Doctor, granting him a new regeneration cycle. The Doctor uses the excess energy of his regeneration to destroy the Daleks, while the crack closes, ending the stalemate. In the aftermath, the Doctor sets the TARDIS in motion, and finishes regenerating. The Twelfth Doctor finds the TARDIS is crashing and asks Clara if she knows how to fly it while she looks on in confusion.

== Production ==
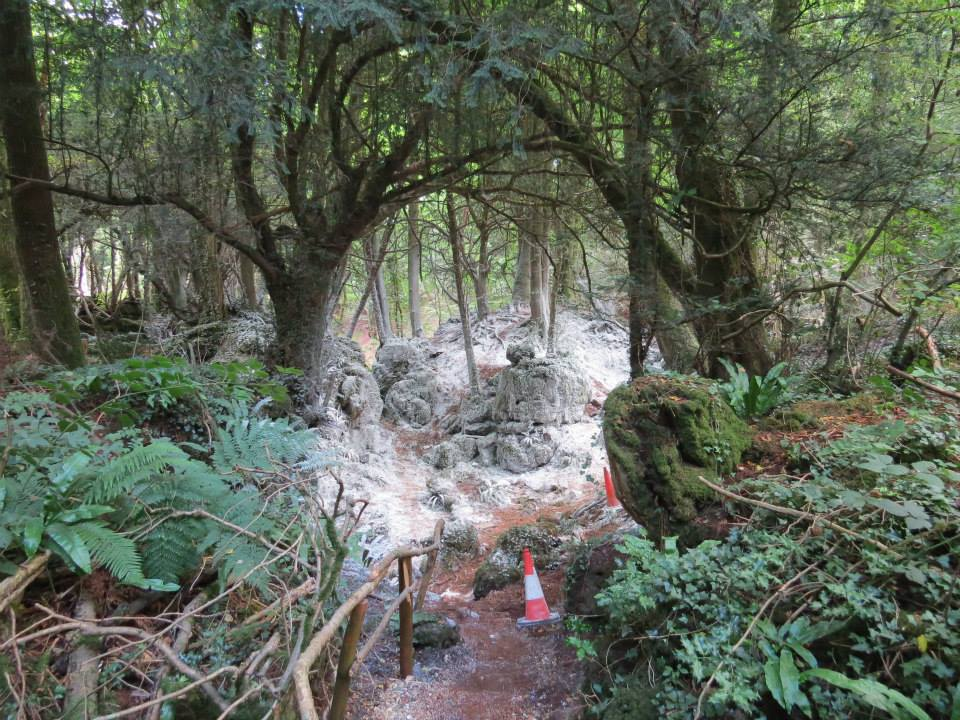
Fake snow at Puzzlewood for filming.

Actor Matt Smith said filming would commence on the episode when he had finished work on the film Lost River. He later revealed filming would start in September. The episode was directed by Jamie Payne, who previously directed the episode "Hide". The read-through for the Christmas special took place on 4 September 2013.

In August 2013, lead writer Steven Moffat stated in an interview that the Christmas episode would tie together the remaining story strands from the Eleventh Doctor era, some of which were introduced as far back as "The Eleventh Hour". Production on the episode was scheduled to start on 8 September. Owing to his work on Lost River, which required him to have a buzz cut, Matt Smith had to wear a wig to mimic the Doctor's signature hairstyle. In August 2013, it was revealed that the Cybermen would feature in the Christmas episode, when one of the show's regular stunt artists, Darrelle "Daz" Parker, tweeted that she would be playing a Cyberman.

=== Casting ===
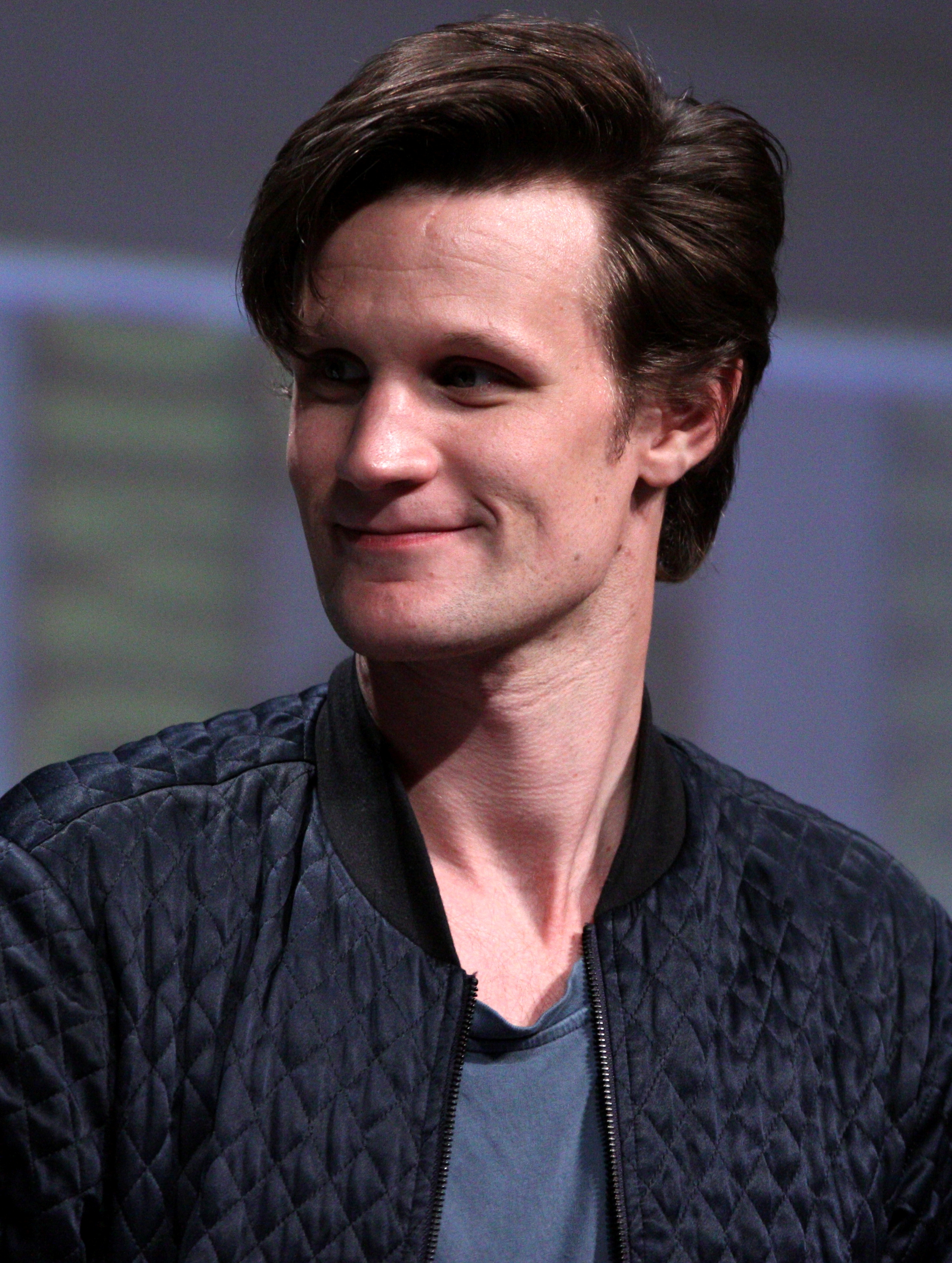
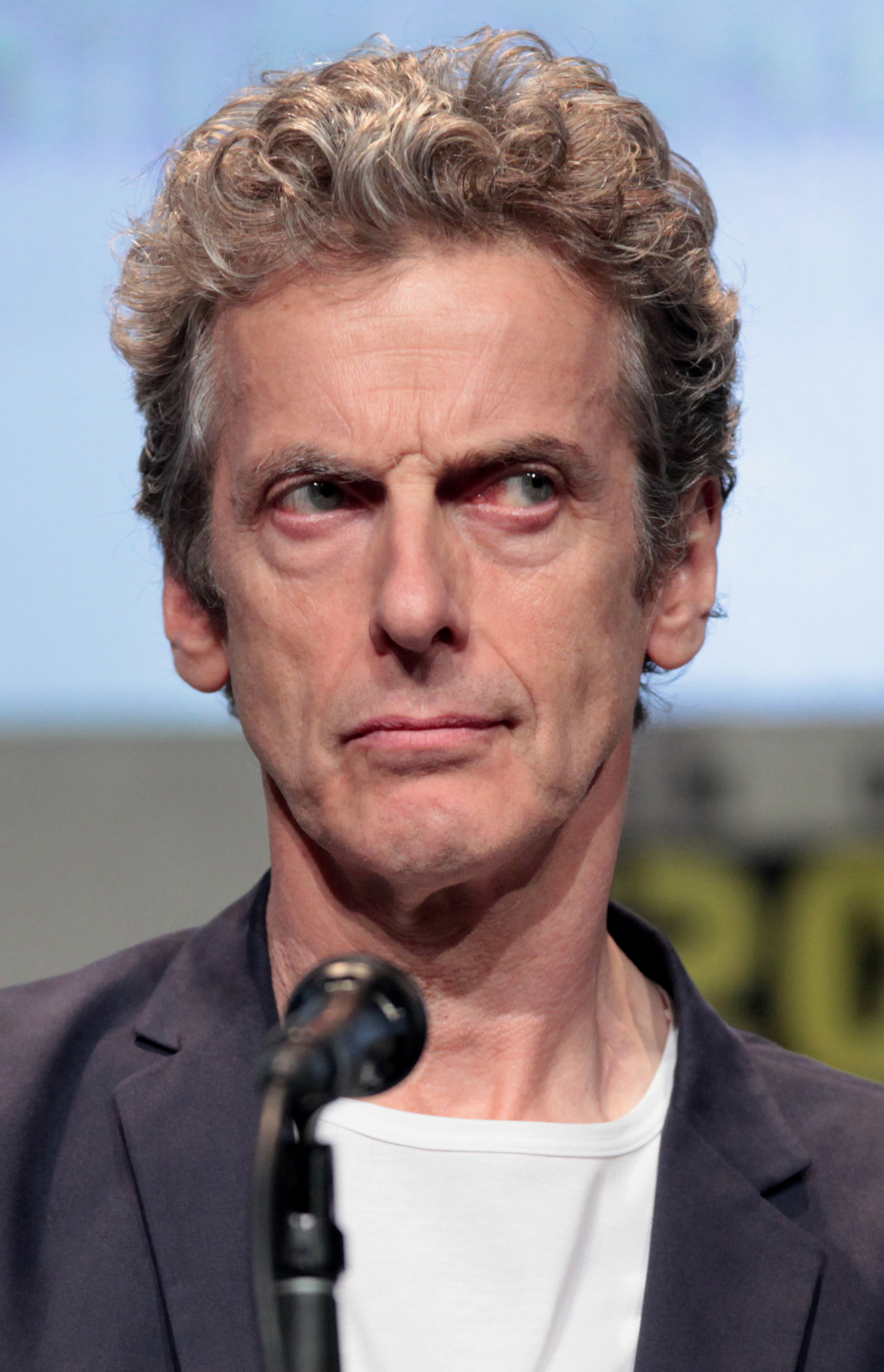
"The Time of the Doctor" is the last episode to feature Matt Smith (left) in the central role, and the second to include Peter Capaldi (right) as the new Doctor, following his cameo in "The Day of the Doctor".

Sheila Reid had previously appeared in Vengeance on Varos in 1985. Elizabeth Rider had voiced the evil satnav system ATMOS in The Sontaran Stratagem in 2008; and Lady Ellen in The Sarah Jane Adventures episode Lost in Time in 2010. Karen Gillan appeared as Amy Pond for the first time since "The Angels Take Manhattan". Gillan, like Smith, had to wear a wig (in her case, made from her own hair) after shaving her head to appear in the film Guardians of the Galaxy.

==== Casting the next Doctor ====
On 1 June 2013, the BBC announced that Smith would be departing the series after almost four years, with the Christmas special episode being the episode of transition between Smith's Doctor and the next regeneration. The announcement sparked media and fan speculation as to who the next Doctor might be. It was announced on 4 August 2013, during a special broadcast – Doctor Who Live: The Next Doctor – that the twelfth incarnation of the Doctor would be played by Peter Capaldi.

=== Filming ===
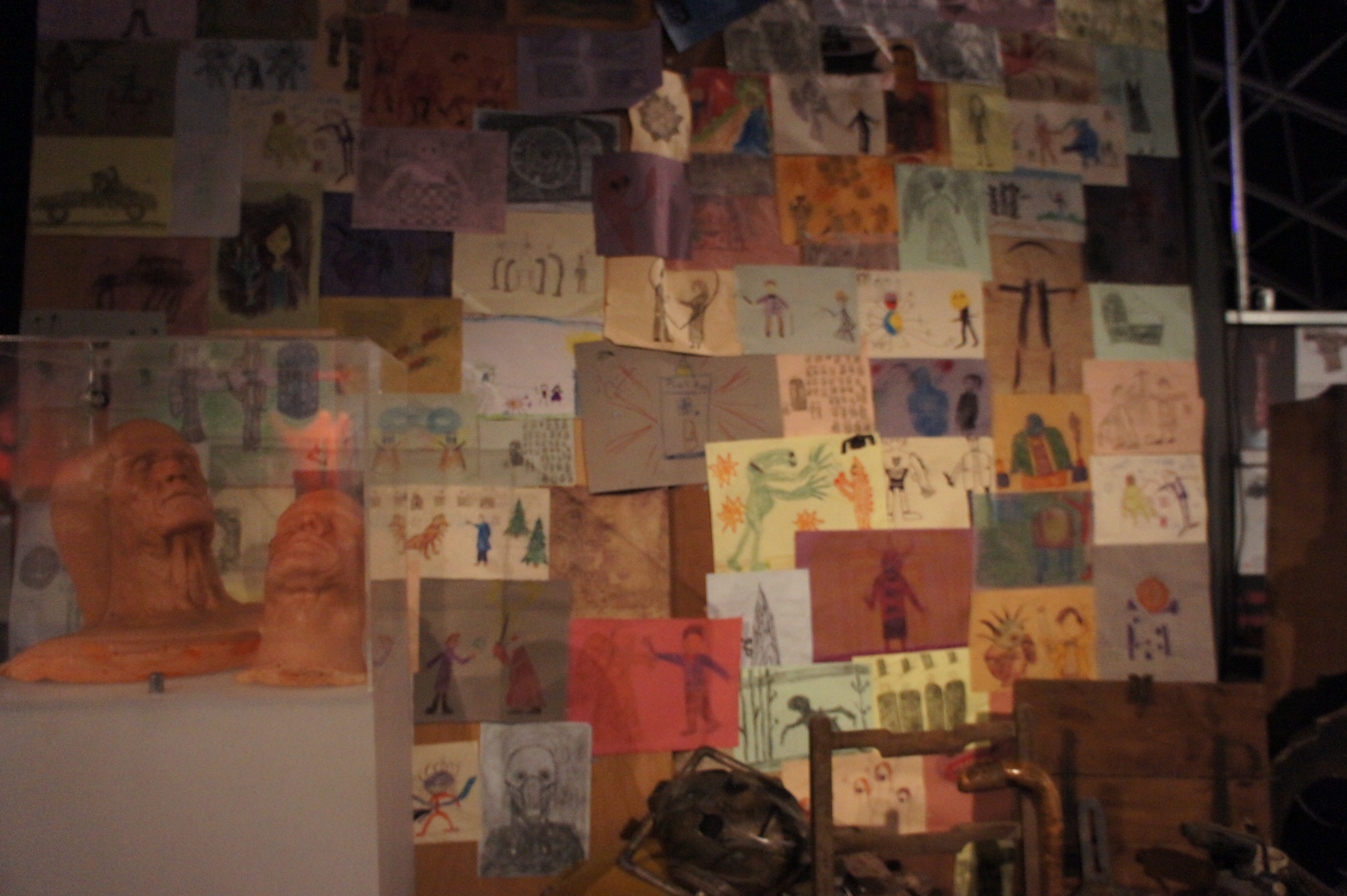
The drawings the older Doctor is surrounded by, as shown at the Doctor Who Experience.

Filming for the episode began on 8 September 2013. On 10 September, Smith and Jenna Coleman were seen filming on location in Cardiff. The location was Lydstep Flats, which had been previously used in Series 1 as the Powell Estate where Rose Tyler lived with her mother Jackie. On 19 September 2013, scenes were being filmed in the evening at Puzzlewood with fake snow being scattered over certain areas. During shooting of the episode, elements were also filmed to be incorporated in both the previous and following episodes; Matt Smith also filmed a scene intended to be incorporated into the first episode of Series 8, while Peter Capaldi was filmed for his brief introductory cameo that was part of "The Day of the Doctor". On 5 October 2013, Doctor Who producer Marcus Wilson revealed via Twitter that filming was complete.

== Marketing ==
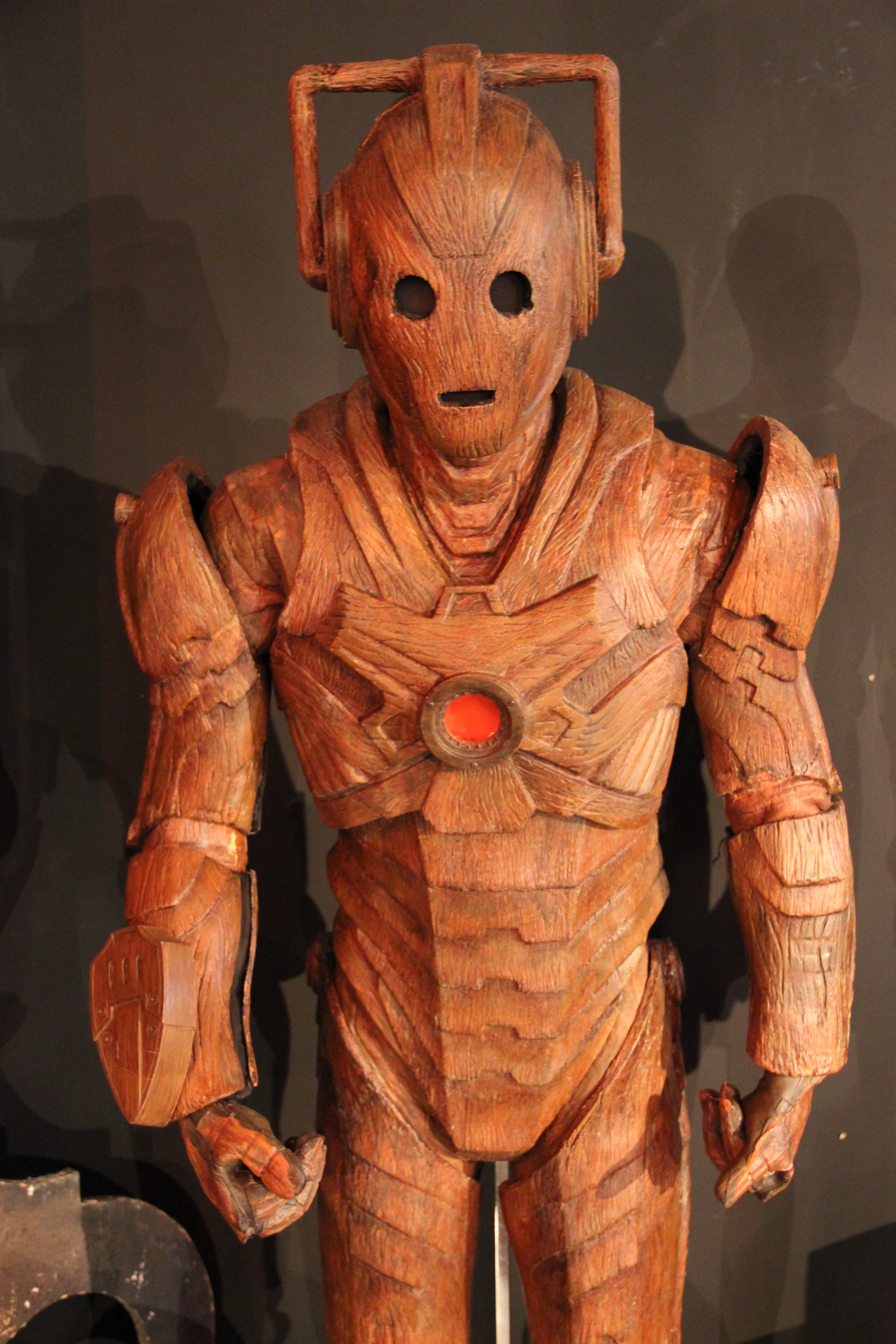
The wooden Cyberman as it appears at the Doctor Who Experience

=== Trailers ===
A sneak preview for the episode was shown after the simulcast of "The Day of the Doctor", confirming the appearance of the Cybermen and revealing the inclusion of the Silence, Daleks, Sontarans and Weeping Angels, as well as confirming the Doctor's return to the planet Trenzalore. The title and a poster were released on 26 November. In the BBC Christmas 2013 trailer, there were clips confirming the Daleks and the Cybermen. Through the online Doctor Who "Adventure Calendar", more images were released in December. On 11 December, the BBC released a 35-second trailer in which the Daleks pronounce "The Doctor is Regenerating!" There was also the Silence, Cybermen, Clara and the Doctor featured in the clip. On 17 December 2013, BBC One released another Christmas trailer, featuring Clara calling the Doctor during a Cyberman attack on the TARDIS. Prior to the episode's broadcast, the BBC released three preview clips.

== Broadcast and reception ==
"The Time of the Doctor" was broadcast in the United Kingdom on BBC One on Christmas Day 2013 when it received initial overnight ratings of 8.30 million viewers (30.7% share) against the long-running soap opera Coronation Street which got 7.9 million viewers (though this was later bumped to 8.27 million after the later repeat showing on ITV+1 was factored in). "The Time of the Doctor" was the second most watched programme of the entire day across all channels, with the final 5 minutes (the regeneration from Smith to Capaldi) receiving the largest peak viewers of the day with 10.2 million. The final viewing figures for the episode were 11.14 million viewers. The episode also was top show on BBC iPlayer with 1.96 million requests, as reported two weeks later.

The episode was also shown on 25 December in the United States on BBC America, where, with 2.47m viewers, it achieved the highest ever audience figures for the channel, beating the previous record set just over a month beforehand with "The Day of the Doctor". It was also seen in Canada on Space. In Australia it aired on 26 December on ABC1, and in New Zealand, it screened on Prime Television during Boxing Day evening with 106,390 viewers. It received an Appreciation Index of 83 in the UK.

=== Critical reception ===
Professional ratings
Aggregate scores
Source	Rating
Rotten Tomatoes (Average Score)	8.2
Rotten Tomatoes (Tomatometer)	88%
Review scores
Source	Rating
IGN	8.4
The A.V. Club	A
The Telegraph	3/5 stars
TV Fanatic	4.5/5 stars

"The Time of the Doctor" received positive reviews from critics. Rotten Tomatoes gave the episode an approval rating of 88%, based on 16 critics, and an average score of 8.2/10. The website's critical consensus reads, "Doctor Who: The Time of the Doctor is a wistful swan song for Matt Smith, who gives such a graceful bow that he secures his place as one of the most essential Time Lords." Dan Martin of The Guardian praised the episode as "awfully good". He wrote that Steven Moffat had "performed the fourth remix of the show's mythology in a row, tying up strands that date back to the beginning of Matt Smith's run." He added, "Perfectly, the rebooting of his regeneration cycle was done simply... Who could have guessed the Doctor's renewed regeneration cycle would be dealt with as simply as his best friend just asking nicely?" Mark Snow of IGN gave the episode a score of 8.4, "GREAT", writing that "'The Time of the Doctor' was an exemplary exercise in celebrating the departure of a loved one. If you managed to stay dry-eyed during the Doctor's goodbye to Clara (itself a not-entirely-transparent goodbye from Smith to the role he embodied), then you should probably double check your heart's still working," also lauding Karen Gillan's "rather crowd-pleasing, tear-inducing cameo". While criticising its "rapid, almost breathless pace", he concluded, "It was a melancholic yet ultimately merry end to one of the show's best Doctors to date."

Robert Lloyd of the Los Angeles Times said that Matt Smith exited "with comic energy" and "grace", stating, "The Christmas special embodies the heartfelt style and playfulness that Matt Smith brought to his spell as the Time Lord. There are two ways to watch the series. The first requires a deep knowledge of its complicated 50-year-history and an ability to keep complicated strands of time-twisting action straight in one's head. The other way is to watch it for the poetry, the resonances and the connections and a sense of wonder about life (extra-terrestrially dressed at times, but our life underneath)."

Jon Cooper of The Mirror gave the episode a positive review, calling it "Easily the highlight of Christmas telly," and that it "gave Matt Smith a perfect send off." He awarded the episode 4 stars out of 5. He praised Smith, saying, "Easily the best he's put in since his tenure began." He criticised the pacing, noting that "viewers hoping for an all-out intergalactic bloodbath must've left feeling disappointed, hundreds of years of inter-species warfare were skipped over in the blink of an eye". He also found the need for every single one of the Doctor's enemies to be there pointless, saying "Daleks on their own would have more than sufficed." He also found similarities with David Tennant's regeneration story "The End of Time", mainly the regeneration sequence, with the Doctor removing one piece of his costume before changing, and the now traditional callback to the previous regeneration with Capaldi's entrance with the kidneys line.

Neela Debnath of The Independent gave a positive review, saying that "Smith gave a cracking final performance before bowing out." She said that the episode "was a sci-fi spectacular!" She also criticised the plot as being too complicated for its own good.

Morgan Jeffrey of Digital Spy gave the episode 4 stars out of 5 and said that "Matt Smith steals the show, his final turn on Doctor Who is one of his very finest, perhaps even his absolute best." He compared it to David Tennant's final episode and said "Smith's regeneration scene too is a thing of beauty, like David Tennant before him, Smith gets to break the fourth wall, just a little, in his extended final monologue, [...] it's perfect." He also was positive towards Clara and suggested that she was now being written in a more human, empathetic way "in the wake of the Impossible Girl arc", although such efforts were "well-intentioned but rushed", he felt that there were "steps being taken in the right direction" with the character. He praised Jenna Coleman's performance, saying she is "dependably excellent." But he did say "'The Time of the Doctor' is a case of the parts being greater than the whole. It has great scenes and standout moments rather than being a great episode." He also criticised the pacing and "a repetitive story structure robbing many key moments of their power."

Alasdair Wilkins of The A.V. Club was overwhelmingly positive in his review, praising the subtle emotional complexities. "This episode belongs to Matt Smith, and it's entirely likely that this will go down as his finest work in the role. Steven Moffat takes great care to spotlight every aspect of Smith's Doctor. He is alternately grumpy, funny, awkward, flirty, inquisitive, giddy, and heartbroken, and that simply covers the bits up to the reveal of the crack in reality. The old-age makeup isn't entirely convincing—though I'm not honestly sure any old-age makeup has ever been entirely convincing—but Smith nicely modulates his performance to suit the increasingly wizened versions of his Doctor." He praised the episode for being an effective "final act" rather than a standalone story. He gave the episode a rating of "A".

Kyle Anderson of Nerdist wrote the finale "might leave a percentage of fandom cold, but... I can’t think of a better way for the Eleventh Doctor to end his tenure." He stated, "There were lots of loose ends for writer Steven Moffat to tie up, but somehow he did it." Of the Doctor's protection of Trenzalore: "It’s this action that is the perfect farewell to the Eleventh Doctor. He’s the Doctor, more than any other, who has run away and not wanted to be tied to any one place or time... compelled to stay put to save each and every life he can." The final scene "[allowed] the Eleventh Doctor to go out with dignity and both appreciate the sadness of leaving without casting a pall over the new." He added, "We get our first, very fleeting glimpse of the next Doctor, Peter Capaldi, who is just as intense and strange as we probably expected."

Tim Martin of The Telegraph gave the episode three stars, criticising the complexity of the episode and the fact that loose plot holes were all left to be answered in just 60 minutes: "Every time the Gordian plot-knot gets sonic-screwdrivered into submission for the 60-minute limit, the writers just tap the remnants into Later. What's the deal with the creepy brain-wiping creatures known as The Silence? Later. The name of the Doctor? Later, and then we get The Time of the Doctor, where every second line seems to offer a footnote to some arcane Wikipedia entry on Whovian lore." Despite this, he praised Smith's final performance saying, "the actor was so good as the childlike alien."

Patrick Mulkern of Radio Times said he was "really warming to the current companion, especially now she's free of the 'Impossible Girl' baggage. Perky, resourceful, best-friend material, Jenna Coleman's Clara has a tangible echo of Lis Sladen's Sarah about her." He noticed an End of Time callback, with the Doctor seeing his previous companions before his regeneration and, just as the Tenth Doctor had once destroyed the TARDIS with regeneration energy, the Eleventh doctor destroyed a Dalek ship with it. He looked forward to seeing Peter Capaldi take over with his "Gaunt, lizard-like [face] and with frou-frou hair. [...] In Peter Capaldi, we have a dream-wish Doctor."

== Home media ==
"The Time of the Doctor" was released on DVD and Blu-ray in the United Kingdom on 20 January 2014, in Australia on 22 January 2014 and in the United States on 4 March 2014. It is accompanied by a behind-the-scenes feature and two documentaries. The UK and Australian releases additionally comes with an extra disc featuring the Eleventh Doctor's previous Christmas specials, "A Christmas Carol", "The Doctor, the Widow and the Wardrobe" and "The Snowmen". The special was re-released on DVD and Blu-ray on 8 September 2014 as part of a "50th Anniversary Collectors Boxset" alongside "The Name of the Doctor", "The Night of the Doctor", "The Day of the Doctor", "An Adventure in Space and Time" and "The Five(ish) Doctors Reboot".

The ten Christmas specials between "The Christmas Invasion" and "Last Christmas" inclusive were released in a boxset titled Doctor Who – The 10 Christmas Specials on 19 October 2015.

== Soundtrack ==
Selected pieces of score from "The Time of the Doctor", as composed by Murray Gold, were released on 24 November 2014 by Silva Screen Records.
