= River Song =

Fictional character from Doctor Who

- Doctor Who character
- Alex Kingston as River Song
- First appearance: "Silence in the Library" (2008)
- Last appearance: "The Husbands of River Song" (2015)
- Created by: Steven Moffat
- Portrayed by: Adult: Alex Kingston; Baby to young adult: Harrison and Maddison Mortimer; Sydney Wade; Maya Glace-Green; Nina Toussaint-White
- Duration: 2008, 2010–2013, 2015

In-universe information
- Full name: Melody Pond
- Aliases: Mels, Melody Malone, River Song
- Nickname: "Mrs. Robinson" (by the Doctor)
- Species: Human with Time Lord DNA
- Gender: Female
- Occupation: Archaeologist; Assassin
- Affiliation: Tenth Doctor; Eleventh Doctor; Twelfth Doctor
- Family: Rory Williams (father); Amy Pond (mother); Anthony Brian Williams (adoptive brother)
- Spouse: The Doctor
- Relatives: Brian Williams (paternal grandfather)

River Song is a fictional character created by Steven Moffat and played by Alex Kingston in the British science-fiction series Doctor Who. River Song was introduced to the series as an experienced future companion of series protagonist the Doctor, an alien Time Lord who travels through time in his TARDIS. Because River Song is a time traveller herself, her adventures with the Doctor occur out of synchronisation; their first meeting (from the audience's perspective) is with the Tenth Doctor (played by David Tennant), the Doctor's first and apparently her last. Kingston plays her in 15 episodes, as River becomes a companion, romantic interest and eventual wife of the Doctor in his eleventh incarnation portrayed by Matt Smith. From a production perspective, the Twelfth Doctor (played by Peter Capaldi) is the last incarnation to meet her, spending a 24-year-long night with her, before her first meeting with the Tenth Doctor. From the timeline perspective, the final time River meets with the Doctor, she is a hologram/echo from the library archives; she and the Eleventh Doctor part ways in the episode, "The Name of the Doctor".

River Song was created by Doctor Who writer Steven Moffat for the show's fourth series in 2008, under the tenure of then executive producer Russell T Davies. When Moffat took over Davies' duties as executive producer, he began expanding on the character's background, depicting adventures earlier in River's timeline, upgrading Alex Kingston from a guest star to a recurring actor in the series. Other actresses have subsequently portrayed younger versions of the character.

When the character was first introduced, much about her origins remained a mystery. Following the character's initial appearance, Davies had described her as "one of the most important characters" in the narrative, and "vital" to the Doctor's life. In series six (2011), Moffat's episodes unveil more about the character. It is not until the character's ninth appearance that it is revealed that River was born Melody Pond, the daughter of the eleventh Doctor's companions Amy Pond (Karen Gillan) and Rory Williams (Arthur Darvill), alongside whom Kingston had already appeared six previous times in series five and six of the show. Having been conceived on board the TARDIS as it travelled through the time vortex, Melody was born with genetic traits and abilities similar to those of the Doctor's own race, the Time Lords.

== Appearances ==
=== Television ===
Three of the six actresses to portray River Song at different stages in her story. From left to right: Sydney Wade, Nina Toussaint-White and Alex Kingston.

River Song first appears in the Doctor Who 2008 series two-parter "Silence in the Library"/"Forest of the Dead" (which was written by future showrunner Steven Moffat) during the Russell T Davies era of Doctor Who. Here, she encounters the Tenth Doctor (David Tennant) in the 51st century and, though he has never met her, claims to be someone he will come to trust completely. River, who is a professor of archaeology and carries a TARDIS-colour/pattern diary of her adventures, is able to convince the Doctor of his future trust in her by whispering his real name into his ear, which he explains he would only divulge under extraordinarily rare circumstances. At the end of the second episode, she sacrifices herself to save the people who were trapped in the Library's database, knocking out the Doctor before he can do the same. In turn, he is able to upload a copy of her consciousness into a computer, allowing her to live on in a virtual world with the archaeological team she was with in the Library. He achieves this via the use of a sonic screwdriver given to her by his future self.

After Moffat took over from Davies as executive producer of the show, River Song reappeared in the 2010 series. In the two-parter "The Time of Angels"/"Flesh and Stone", which takes place prior to River becoming a professor, she encounters the Eleventh Doctor (Matt Smith), again having more history with him than he with her. She leaves coordinates for the Doctor so that he may rescue her in the 52nd century; joined by the Doctor's latest companion, Amy Pond (Karen Gillan), they investigate the crash of the spaceship Byzantium. She shows herself to be more adept at flying the TARDIS than he is and reveals to the Doctor that she is imprisoned in the "Stormcage Containment Facility" for killing "the best man I've ever known."

An earlier version of River appears to assist the Doctor in the fifth series finale "The Pandorica Opens"/"The Big Bang". After being contacted by Winston Churchill (Ian McNeice), River leads the Doctor to 102 C.E. While River is travelling in the TARDIS on her own, it explodes with her inside. The Doctor, using River's vortex manipulator, teleports her out. After the Doctor erases himself from history by flying the Pandorica into the exploding TARDIS in order to close the cracks in the universe, River helps Amy to remember the Doctor and bring him back, by giving Amy her now-blank diary. At the close of the series five finale, River ambiguously suggests to the Doctor that they might be married and tells him that he will soon learn the truth about her, after which "everything changes".

In the 2011 series opener "The Impossible Astronaut"/"Day of the Moon", River, along with Amy and her husband Rory (Arthur Darvill), is contacted by a future version of the Doctor to meet up in the United States. As they enjoy a lakeside picnic, this future Doctor is killed by an assailant in a space suit, and the trio give him a Viking funeral, in Lake Silencio. In 1969, the present Doctor and company subsequently encounter a little girl (Sydney Wade) who wears the space suit, which River tells the Doctor is a life support unit; the suit has been designed by the hypnotic aliens known as the Silence. Homeless, the girl is later shown regenerating in New York City, 1970. In "A Good Man Goes to War", when Amy and Rory's daughter Melody (Harrison and Maddison Mortimer) is born, it is revealed that River is the grownup Melody – who was conceived in the TARDIS while it was in the Time Vortex and consequently carries Time Lord DNA. The name River Song comes from a recursive translation of Melody Pond via the language of the Gamma Forests, which have no ponds, only rivers, hence the translation of "Pond" to "River." Baby Melody is kidnapped by Madame Kovarian (Frances Barber) to become a weapon against the Doctor.

"Let's Kill Hitler" establishes that Melody was trained by the Silence to kill the Doctor. At some point after regenerating in New York, Melody becomes Rory and Amy's childhood friend Mels (Maya Glace-Green) and grew up with them, and enlightened them to their romantic feelings for each other and ensuring her own existence. When adult Mels (Nina Toussaint-White) is shot, and regenerates into her next incarnation (Alex Kingston), she proceeds to do what she was created for: assassinate the Doctor. Persuaded she will one day become River Song, who the Doctor cares deeply about and places in great trust, Melody chooses to resurrect the Doctor with her own regenerative energy, losing any future regenerations. The Doctor learns, however, that it is she who kills him in the future. While she is recovering in bed, the Doctor gives her the blank TARDIS-shaped/coloured diary, and in an epilogue it is revealed that Melody (now River) wants to study archaeology. At the end of "Closing Time", on the day she receives her doctorate, the Silence and Kovarian recapture her and trap her in the space suit in order to kill the Doctor as history will record. In the series six finale "The Wedding of River Song", River refuses to kill the Doctor as she is supposed to, creating an alternate reality in which time has frozen and all realities are occurring at once. In order to restart time and repair reality, the two of them must touch. The Doctor marries River and convinces her to repair the timeline by letting her know that he plans to fake his own death and how. River goes to prison for his murder in order to corroborate the deception, though it is established that she regularly breaks out of prison to go on dates and adventures with him with the aid of hallucinogenic lipstick (used on the guards) and other tricks.

River appears again in the fifth episode of the seventh series, "The Angels Take Manhattan" (2012), where she encounters the Doctor and her parents, in 1930s New York City. At this later point in her timeline, she is a professor of archaeology and a free woman, having been released from the Stormcage Prison after the Doctor erased all evidence of his existence. When her parents are sent permanently back in time by the Weeping Angels, to be forever parted from the Doctor, she arranges for Amy to leave the Doctor a message in the form of an epilogue in a book they have been reading written by her in the 1930s. Although she agrees to travel with the Doctor for the time being, she declines his offer of being a full-time companion. In "The Name of the Doctor" (2013), the deceased River's consciousness is summoned from the Library computer, where she has existed since "Forest of the Dead", into a psychic 'conference call' by the Doctor's friend Madame Vastra (Neve McIntosh). There, she and Clara (Jenna Coleman) learn that the Doctor's grave has been discovered. River maintains the psychic link with Clara after the call ends, and counsels her throughout the exploration of the Doctor's tomb, although she seems to be invisible to everyone else. When the Doctor and his companions are threatened by the Great Intelligence, she whispers the Doctor's name in order to open his tomb which is inside the TARDIS. After Clara enters the Doctor's time stream to save him from the Great Intelligence, who entered it first so he could destroy the Doctor in all his regenerations, the Doctor reveals that he could see River all along, but had been avoiding confronting her continued existence because it was too painful for him to bear. After he kisses her, River feels closure and fades away. However, before disappearing River points out that her continued presence indicates that Clara has not been destroyed by entering his time stream, and, therefore, he can save her.

When the Doctor next encounters River, in "The Husbands of River Song" (2015), as the Twelfth Doctor (Peter Capaldi), she does not initially recognise him and he is able to learn more about what she is like when he is not around. The Doctor accompanies River (from her perspective, shortly after "The Angels Take Manhattan") on a scheme to obtain a rare diamond. He learns that in addition to him, River has had several spouses, both male and female, and is not above ruthless behaviour as she goes about her work. He also discovers that she truly loves him, but that she also genuinely believes that he does not love her back. She feels that the Doctor is above such petty emotions as love, and that he would never willingly jeopardise himself simply to help her. River ultimately discovers that the man she's been having this adventure with is actually the Doctor, with a new face she doesn't have a record of, thinking he only had 12 regenerations and that she'd already seen his last one. The pair later crash-land on the planet Darillium, where River had told the Doctor in "Forest of the Dead" that they would have their last night together. He uses time travel to ensure a perfect date, gives her the sonic screwdriver that she had in "Silence in the Library", and comforts her by revealing that the nights on Darillium last "24 years", giving River a happy life spent with the Doctor before her impending death in the Library.

In the 2017 series opener "The Pilot", a photograph of River is seen on the Doctor's desk in the university in which he is lecturing, beside a photograph of his granddaughter Susan Foreman. River is also referenced in the episode "Extremis", and it is revealed that she ordered her employee Nardole (Matt Lucas) to keep an eye on the Doctor for her in the event of her death. River was also mentioned by the Fifteenth Doctor in the 60th Anniversary Special "The Giggle" when mentioning to the Fourteenth Doctor of the people they lost throughout their lives.

=== Other media ===
Coinciding with the 2010 series, Alex Kingston portrays River Song narrating the "Monster Files" on the BBC website, an in-universe documentary account of Doctor Who monsters. This series had previously (in 2008–09) been narrated by John Barrowman in character as Captain Jack Harkness.

Included with the series six DVD release, the exclusive-to-DVD bonus five-part serial Night and the Doctor (2011) references River throughout, with River appearing in the mini-episodes "First Night" and "Last Night". The serial helps explain the depth of the relationship shared by River and the Doctor – despite only appearing in 15 (14 plus one flashback, as of 2016) episodes of the television series – when Amy Pond discovers that the Doctor goes on dates with River when Amy and Rory sleep at night in the TARDIS. During the serial, the Doctor attempts to take River on a date shortly after she is imprisoned in Stormcage, but their time in the TARDIS is interrupted by two future incarnations of River, and all are in turn suspicious of the signs of "another woman" being aboard the TARDIS. The Doctor is able to be rid of the two future Rivers, but not before learning from his future self that one of them is shortly to die in the Library adventure where he first met her. (It is later revealed in "The Husbands of River Song" that the Eleventh Doctor ultimately cancelled this date, and it is the Twelfth Doctor who ends up taking River to the Singing Towers.)

River appears in a further direct-to-DVD mini-episode included with the series 7 box set, "Rain Gods".

River, alongside Smith's Eleventh Doctor, is one of two main playable characters in the PlayStation 3 Doctor Who console game The Eternity Clock. Kingston provided voice acting and motion capture physical acting for the character. In regard to River's role in the narrative of the game, the game's producer Simon Harris explains that she "realises that what’s in her diary is not what she wrote and that actually the Eternity Clock is playing with her history, as well as the Earth’s history."

Author Gary Russell had planned to use River in the Twelfth Doctor novel The Big Bang Generation, but when he was unable to get permission to use her due to Steven Moffat planning on the 2015 Christmas special "The Husbands of River Song" being the Twelfth Doctor and River's first meeting, Moffat suggested that Russell write the story to incorporate the Seventh Doctor's former companion Bernice Summerfield instead.

==== Audio ====
Alex Kingston has reprised the role of River Song in multiple audio plays produced by Big Finish Productions, most notably in her own spin-off series The Diary of River Song. The series was announced on 27 June 2015, along with the news that Kingston would make a guest appearance as River in volume two of the ongoing The Eighth Doctor Adventures saga, Doom Coalition.

===== The Diary of River Song =====
Volume one of The Diary of River Song was released on 25 December 2015, coinciding with River Song's return to television in The Husbands of River Song. The series depicts River's adventures as a time-travelling archaeologist and concluded following its twelfth volume in August 2023, with Big Finish indicating that Kingston would continue to play River Song in other audio ranges. Many characters from Doctor Who make guest appearances over the course of its run, including multiple incarnations of The Doctor and The Master, Madame Kovarian (Frances Barber), K9 (John Leeson), Proper Dave (Harry Peacock) and Jackie Tyler (Camille Coduri).

Diary also introduces original recurring characters, such as Rachel (played by Kingston's real-life daughter, Salome Haertel), an android who becomes a surrogate daughter to River; Luke (Timothy Blore), an archeology student; and Brooke (Nina Toussaint-White), a clone of River created at Demon's Run, whom River regards as a sister.

===== The Death & Life of River Song =====
On 4 April 2024, Big Finish announced a brand new series featuring River Song, with Kingston reprising the role. The first volume of The Death & Life of River Song was released in August 2024, depicting River's post-mortem adventures as a data ghost (as seen in The Name of the Doctor) downloaded into a cloned body.

==== Other appearances ====
In November 2020, Big Finish released The Tenth Doctor and River Song - a special release featuring River Song teaming up with the Tenth Doctor (David Tennant) for three new adventures. Kingston would later join the cast of The Tenth Doctor Adventures for the concluding part of its Dalek Universe saga, while Tennant would make an uncredited cameo in volume eight of Diary.

Marking International Women's Day 2019, River appears in an episode of The Eighth of March where she teams up with former companion Leela (Louise Jameson). River also guest stars in series eight of the UNIT – The New Series range; the anniversary release The Legacy of Time, where she meets fellow time-travelling archaeologist companion Bernice Summerfield (Lisa Bowerman); and the special release Peladon. In 2020, Kingston appeared in the final episode of The Lives of Captain Jack, which saw a team up between River and Captain Jack Harkness (John Barrowman). Marking the sixtieth anniversary of Doctor Who, Kingston appeared in the final episode of the Once and Future series.

Kingston joined the main cast of The Ninth Doctor Adventures for its final volume in May 2024, in which River goes on several adventures with the Ninth Doctor (Christopher Eccleston).

== Characterisation ==
=== Casting ===
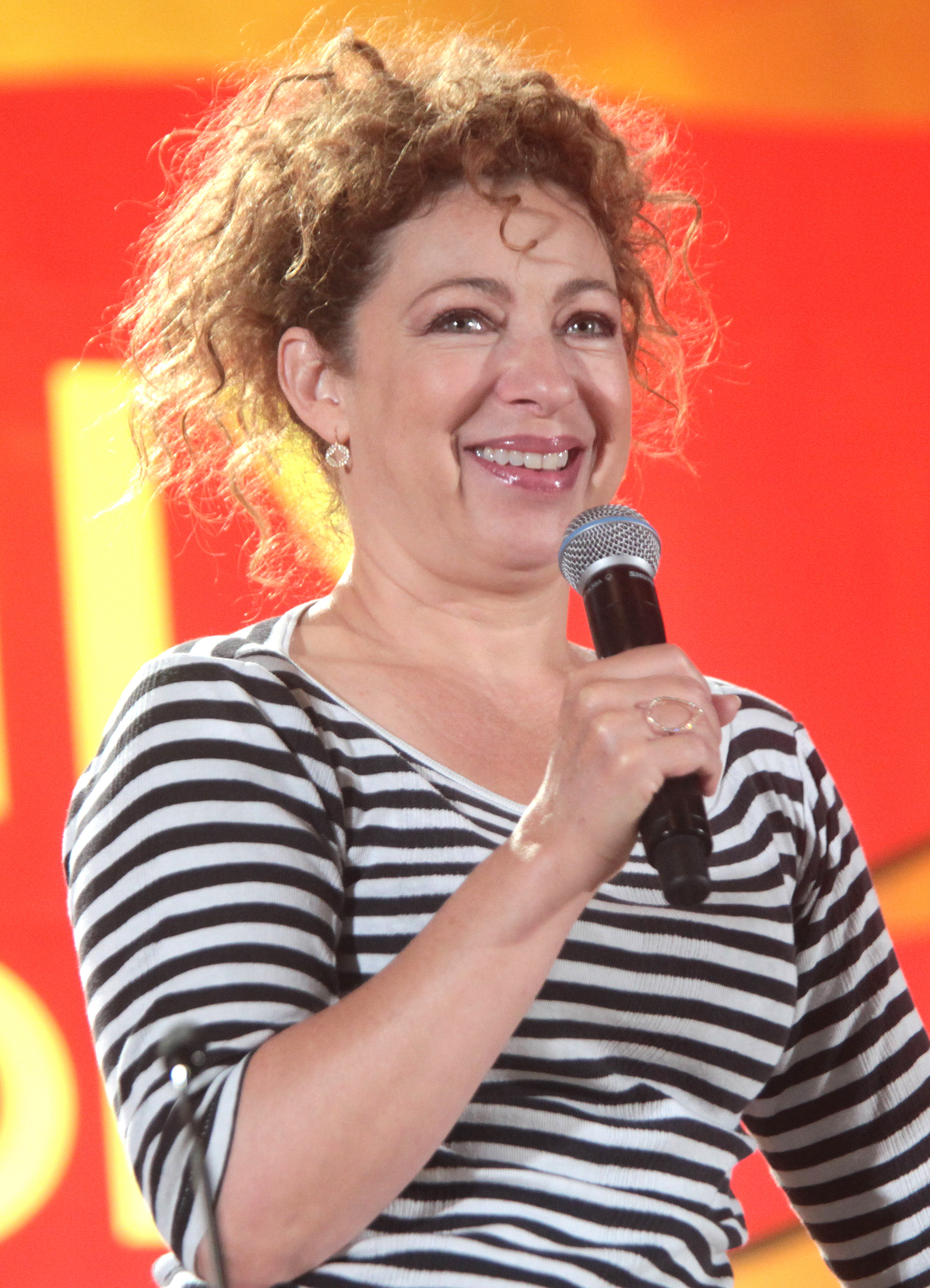
Alex Kingston (pictured in 2016) portrayed River Song.

For the role of River Song, whom executive producer Russell T Davies described as "sort of the Doctor's wife", the production sought to cast Kate Winslet. One of Winslet's first acting roles was in the BBC1 teen drama Dark Season, written by Davies. The role of River Song eventually went to Alex Kingston, known for starring in the popular US drama ER. On Kingston's casting, Davies said, "I bloody love her!" Kingston had been a fan of Doctor Who as a child. Kingston, when first cast, did not expect her role to be recurring. She later learned that Moffat had always intended for Song to come back for return appearances. Kingston enjoyed getting to play an unusual action hero female role, and praised the show for its variety of settings and opportunities "to relive one's childhood fantasies" playing with laser guns and wearing varied costumes from one appearance to the next. With regard to having to speak complicated technical dialogue, she said, "I'd work with a medical consultant on ER, who'd explain what we were saying, so I'd say it with a purpose and a truth. On Doctor Who, I've no idea what some of my lines mean!"

Discussing her role alongside Tennant and Catherine Tate (Donna Noble) in her 2008 introductory episode, Kingston said, "We just clicked. I've done guest roles on other shows, but rarely have I felt such a warm bond." About working with Kingston, Catherine Tate said, "I'm a huge ER fan. When you hold people in awe, it's almost a disappointment when they come in and they're utterly normal. But Alex isn't disappointing at all. She's such a lovely person." David Tennant was quoted as saying, "Alex is terrific. When she's telling you stories about hanging out with George Clooney, you know she's pretty cool."

=== Conception and development ===
The character was originally created purely for the plot of "Silence in the Library". Moffat knew that the team of archaeologists would have to trust the Doctor, but the Doctor's psychic paper could not explain and convince the team why he had appeared in a sealed-off library. Therefore, Moffat intended for the Doctor to know one of the archaeologists, but decided that idea was "dull" and instead decided to have one of them know him. Davies and Moffat were going through a phase in which they tried to find Doctor Who titles with rude acronyms "to wind up people on internet message boards", with one of Moffat's being "A River Song Ending"; when Davies asked "What's a river song?", Moffat decided to make this the name of a character who dies. They eventually changed the title to "Forest of the Dead", being unwilling to actually broadcast an episode with the acronym "ARSE". When Kingston returned to the show, Moffat explained to her some details about her character's back-story, knowledge which Smith, Gillan and Darvill did not receive until later. Kingston relates that she knows her character cannot be killed off because we saw her death in her introductory episode; each subsequent appearance is set at a different point in her character's personal history. Moffat had planned out that River was Amy and Rory's daughter for "a long time" and used "Pond" as Amy's last name to create a link between the two. For the filming of the sixth series, Kingston was aware of River Song's relationship to Amy and Rory, while the other cast only found out upon reading of the mid-season cliffhanger script for "A Good Man Goes to War".

Moffat was influenced by Audrey Niffenegger's science fiction romance novel The Time Traveler's Wife, which depicts a woman who romances and marries a man who unintentionally moves through time. Niffenegger's lovers experience an asynchronous and tragic love story. He comments, "I've quite purposefully used it", though he cites his 2006 episode "The Girl in the Fireplace" as the episode which most prominently explores the book's themes in addition to its conceit. Kingston herself compares the character to Niffenegger's titular Time Traveler's Wife, and like Moffat enjoys "backtracking" more and more with the character as the series progresses. The tragedy for Song highlighted by "The Impossible Astronaut"/"Day of the Moon" is that she is progressing to a point where the Doctor will not know or trust her any more. Kingston comments,

[What] Steven explained to me is that every time River sort of finds the Doctor, for whatever reason, she's never 100 percent sure which Doctor it is she's going to be meeting. And what they have already experienced together or not. So even when I come back, every time I meet Matt, I never quite know where we are in our relationship or what we have revealed or what we know about each other. Because time travel isn't linear.

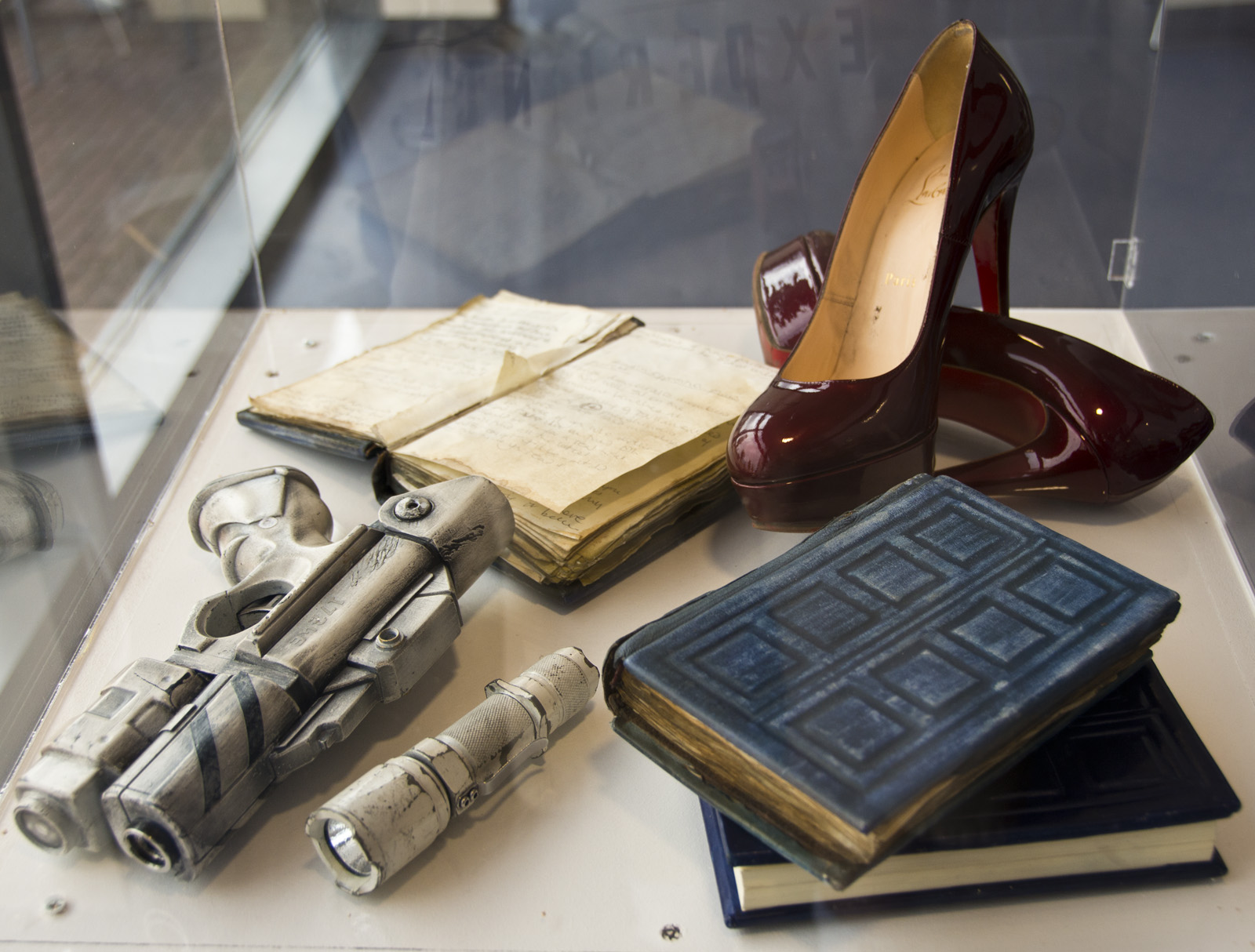
Several artefacts of River Song's, on display at the Doctor Who Experience.

Kingston describes the character as being "like a female Indiana Jones" with regard to both characters being archaeologists and having action hero qualities. She also took inspiration from Sigourney Weaver's portrayal of Ellen Ripley in the Alien film franchise commenting that she'd always been "so envious of her for having that kind of role." Kingston has also praised the way the love story between River and the Doctor has been deftly handled, stating that "I'm not sure you'd get that kind of dynamic in America". For Kingston, the physical age difference between herself and Matt Smith adds to the success of the pairing, whilst she feels that viewers have responded warmly to the notion of an action hero in her 40s. Matt Smith has noted that in his characterisation of the Doctor that "River Song frightens the Doctor but he finds himself strangely attracted to her" and that "what makes her a great companion is that when she turns up all hell breaks loose!".

River's characterisation has invited parallels with that of Jack Harkness (John Barrowman), a companion of the Ninth and Tenth Doctors introduced by Steven Moffat in 2005. According to Moffat in the Doctor Who Confidential episode accompanying "Forest of the Dead", River's blaster gun is the one previously owned by Jack in the 2005 series of Doctor Who. Upon River's return in series five, Lyle Masaki of AfterElton felt that viewers had the chance to see the character "do her best to channel Captain Jack" by capturing the same "'charming rogue' vibe". In May 2012 Moffat stated that River, like Jack, is bisexual. Heather Hogan, a senior editor of AfterEllen felt that Moffat's ability to create "fascinating, complicated characters like... River Song" is a direct consequence of him abiding by "Captain Jack's label-eschewing motto": "You people and your quaint little categories". James Cornish of WhatCulture subsequently cited River's characterisation in a rebuke against claims of misogyny and homophobia in Moffat's writing. He described her as "a more sexual, trigger happy version of the Doctor" and "the strongest female character seen on Doctor Who for a quite a while". In a 2019 interview with Radio Times, Kingston described the Doctor as River's second wife, with "Cleopatra being the first".

== Reception ==
An article published in Metro, entitled "Doctor Who fans love River Song...", noted how praise from fans on Twitter after the airing of "Day of the Moon" focused heavily on Song. In 2011, Laura Pledger of Radio Times listed Kingston as the fourth best Doctor Who guest star, writing, "For my money we’ve seen rather too much of River in the last two series, but there’s no denying Kingston has created a memorable character in Melody Pond." Keith Phipps for The A.V. Club compared the Doctor and River's romantic storyline to The Curious Case of Benjamin Button, based on the F. Scott Fitzgerald short story, "if a bit more elegantly, for my money—it echoes the plight of anyone who's watched a loved one fade into the shadowlands of dementia. This is not a story that ends well for River and she knows it, whatever flirtatious high spirits being around The Doctor stirs in her." Emily Nussbaum of The New Yorker felt the character to be the Doctor's "soul mate" and described Alex Kingston as "badass".

Neela Debnath of The Independent praised Nina Toussaint-White in her role as Mels, saying she was "every bit as sassy and vivacious as her later incarnation... it was a shame that she regenerated so early on because she brought a different energy to the character". However, Neil McCormick in The Daily Telegraph thought that her sudden introduction as Rory and Amy's childhood friend showed that Moffat was making it up as he went along. Charlie Jane Anders of io9 felt that River Song was at her "high point" in some of the early Matt Smith episodes, where she was "generally badass and mysterious". However, with "The Wedding of River Song", Anders felt she had lost her mystery and independence, and her love for the Doctor was unrealistic.

Whilst critical of the typical characterisation of British female science fiction characters, The Guardian's Krystina Nellis singles out River Song alongside Torchwood's Gwen Cooper (Eve Myles) as positive depictions of strong female characters, stating: "It'd be difficult to find two superwomen in less need of a man to save them." For her role as River Song in the 2011 series of Doctor Who, Alex Kingston won the Best Actress prize at the 2012 SFX magazine Awards. In a 2012 poll conducted by SFX magazine to find the 100 sexiest female characters in science fiction and fantasy, River was voted number 22. She was also included in AfterEllen's Top 50 Favorite Female TV Characters, at number 44. Character Options have also released official toys based on River Song as part of their Doctor Who range. Upon being notified of the existence of a River Song action figure, Kingston stated she did not "quite believe it" as "you don't get that on ER."

Conversely, Emmet Asher-Perrin of Tor.com felt that River's character had an existence that revolves around the Doctor, criticising the character as having "no ambitions of her own, no purpose", and felt that River's subsequent characterization throughout Smith's tenure "diminishes River, makes her so much less than she seemed in the beginning, an adventurer with her own plans and dreams, someone who the Doctor had to respect and acquiesce to on occasion." Princess Weekes from The Mary Sue had mixed feelings about River's personality and criticized how "River's entire existence literally revolves around the Doctor". However, she called her one of the "great modern Mary Sue-type characters, and I wouldn't have it any other way."
