= The Wedding of River Song =

224 – "The Wedding of River Song"
- Doctor Who episode

Cast
- Doctor: Matt Smith – Eleventh Doctor
- Companions: Karen Gillan – Amy Pond; Arthur Darvill – Rory Williams; Alex Kingston – River Song
- Others: Frances Barber – Madame Kovarian; Simon Fisher-Becker – Dorium Maldovar; Ian McNeice – Emperor Winston Churchill; Richard Hope – Dr Malokeh; Marnix Van Den Broeke – The Silence; Nicholas Briggs – Voice of the Dalek; Simon Callow – Charles Dickens; Sian Williams – Herself; Bill Turnbull – Himself; Meredith Vieira – Herself; Niall Greig Fulton – Gideon Vandaleur; Sean Buckley – Barman; Mark Gatiss – Gantok; Emma Campbell-Jones – Dr. Kent; Katharine Burford – Nurse; Richard Dillane – Carter; William Morgan Sheppard – Canton Delaware

Production
- Directed by: Jeremy Webb
- Written by: Steven Moffat
- Produced by: Marcus Wilson
- Executive producers: Steven Moffat; Piers Wenger; Beth Willis
- Music by: Murray Gold
- Production code: 2.13
- Series: Series 6
- Running time: 45 minutes
- First broadcast: 1 October 2011

Chronology
| ← Preceded by "Closing Time" | Followed by → "The Doctor, the Widow and the Wardrobe" |

"The Wedding of River Song" is the thirteenth and final episode in the sixth series of the British science fiction television series Doctor Who, and was first broadcast on BBC One on 1 October 2011. It was written by lead writer and executive producer Steven Moffat and directed by Jeremy Webb.

In the episode, the archaeologist River Song (Alex Kingston) is programmed by the religious order the Silence to kill the alien time traveller the Doctor (Matt Smith) to prevent "the first question" from being asked on a planet called Trenzalore in the Doctor's future. She refuses, and they end up in an alternative timeline where all of time is running simultaneously and beginning to disintegrate. The Doctor tries to restore the universe with the help of River and the alternative universe versions of his companions Amy Pond (Karen Gillan) and Rory Williams (Arthur Darvill). It is revealed that he had already planned escape by posing as himself using the shape-shifting Teselecta.

"The Wedding of River Song" concludes the story arc of the series and reveals what really happened at the start of the season premiere, "The Impossible Astronaut". The episode features many returning characters. It also pays tribute to the classic series character Brigadier Lethbridge-Stewart following the death of the character's actor Nicholas Courtney. One of the last episodes to be filmed for the series, production for "The Wedding of River Song" finished in April 2011. The episode was watched by a total of 7.67 million viewers in the UK. While visual elements were praised, the characters and resolution of the episode received a mixed reception.

== Plot ==
=== Teaser ===
A prelude to the finale was released online 24 September 2011 after the previous episode, "Closing Time". It shows Area 52 with the clock stuck at 5:02 p.m., where the leaders of the religious order the Silence are kept in stasis and River Song is wearing an eye patch in the same fashion as Madame Kovarian.

=== Synopsis ===
The Eleventh Doctor, aware of his imminent death and its time and place, attempts to learn about a religious order called the Silence to learn why he must die. He encounters the shapeshifting robot the Teselecta and its miniaturised crew posing as one of the members of the Silence; they offer him any help within their power as he faces his death. Through them the Doctor is led to Gantok, another Silence member, who takes him to the living head of Dorium Maldovar inside a catacomb. Dorium reveals that the Silence are dedicated to averting the Doctor's future, warning him that silence must fall when "the first question" is asked on the planet Trenzalore, which is "Doctor who?" To avoid crossing his own time stream, the Doctor gives the Teselecta crew four invitations to Lake Silencio in 2011 for Amy and Rory, River, Canton Everett Delaware III, and a younger version of himself.

The Doctor comes to Lake Silencio, Utah to meet his death by a younger version of River, who is being forced to kill the Doctor in the automated space suit contrived by the Silence. River surprises the Doctor by draining the space suit's weapons systems and averting his death. Time becomes "stuck" as a result and begins to disintegrate; all of Earth's history begins to run simultaneously at a fixed moment.

On this "stuck" Earth (with all of time happening at once) Amy takes the Doctor to Area 52, a pyramid base where the Silence are contained in water-filled cells and Madame Kovarian is held hostage. River is also there; aware of the consequences of her actions, she refuses to allow the Doctor to touch her, an event that would lead to time going back to normal and the Doctor dying at Lake Silencio, Utah. Awakened by the Doctor's presence, the Silence escape their cells and attack the troops defending the pyramid. Amy allows Kovarian to die as revenge for the kidnapping and brain-washing of her daughter Melody (aka River Song).

The Doctor and River escape to the top of the pyramid followed by Amy and Rory. The Doctor marries River on the spot and whispers to her to look into his eye. There she sees the miniaturized Doctor and realises that he is inside the Teselecta ship and will not actually die if time's flow is restored. He then requests that River allow him to prevent the universe's destruction. They seal this agreement, and their marriage, with a kiss. Time moves forward and reality returns to normal.

River later visits Amy and Rory to tell them the Doctor is still alive. Elsewhere, the Doctor explains to Dorium that the Doctor's perceived death will enable him to withdraw and be forgotten, as he was getting too much attention.

=== Continuity ===
The Doctor mentions the possibility of visiting Rose Tyler and Jack Harkness. He also says that Queen Elizabeth I is still waiting to elope with him as hinted in "The End of Time"; this explains why she was so angry in "The Shakespeare Code". Amy's office contains the model of the TARDIS she made as a child ("The Eleventh Hour"), along with drawings of various monsters and scenes from her adventures with the Doctor. River Song states that she used her hallucinogenic lipstick on President Kennedy, a possession of hers that was introduced in "The Time of Angels".

One of the Silence calls Rory "the man who dies and dies again", a reference to the many times he appears to die. The episode's main plot centres around the damage caused by River when she tries to re-write a fixed point in time. The concept of "fixed points" in history which may not be altered, even by the Doctor or his companions, was introduced in The Aztecs (1964) and was named and explored in the new series with episodes such as "The Fires of Pompeii" and "The Waters of Mars". When River meets Amy for a bottle of wine, she is wearing military fatigues and says that she "just climbed out of the Byzantium", and that she saw Amy there. This refers to events in "The Time of Angels" and "Flesh and Stone" (the "crash of the Byzantium" first being mentioned in "Silence in the Library").

== Production ==
=== Writing ===
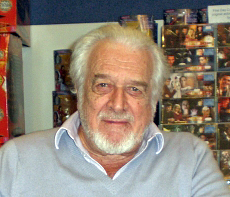
The episode pays tribute to Nicholas Courtney's character Brigadier Lethbridge-Stewart after Courtney died in February 2011.

"The Wedding of River Song" concludes the story arc of the Doctor's apparent death which began in the series opener, "The Impossible Astronaut", and resolves more pieces of River Song's timeline. Despite this, it leaves ambiguous whether the Doctor and River are legitimately married. Showrunner and episode writer Steven Moffat described it as "a big roller coaster ride of Doctor Who madness". One of the "mad idea[s]" he included in the episode, "Live Chess", came because Moffat wanted to make chess — which he called "one of the most boring games in the world" — into a dangerous spectator sport. Originally, the script did not include the brief scene with a Dalek; Moffat had intended to rest the Doctor's most famous adversary for the sixth series. Amy's confrontation with Madame Kovarian, a scene which shows what she might have been like had she not met the Doctor, was also added into the script later.

Following the death of actor Nicholas Courtney, the Doctor learns in the episode that Courtney's character Brigadier Lethbridge-Stewart has died peacefully in a nursing home. Moffat said of the reference, "In a story about the Doctor going to his death, it seemed right and proper to acknowledge one of the greatest losses Doctor Who has endured." Moffat has confirmed that the eye patch-like eyedrives in the episode are also a tribute to Courtney, who wore an eye patch when playing an alternative version of the Brigadier in Inferno (1970). Several characters reappear in the episode, including Charles Dickens (Simon Callow) from "The Unquiet Dead", Winston Churchill (Ian McNeice) from "Victory of the Daleks", the Silurian doctor Malohkeh (Richard Hope) from "The Hungry Earth"/"Cold Blood", the Teselecta and Captain Carter (Richard Dillane) from "Let's Kill Hitler", and the Headless Monks and Dorium (Simon Fisher-Becker) from "A Good Man Goes to War". McNeice felt there was room for his character to return, as "Victory of the Daleks" had hinted that he and the Doctor knew each other well.

=== Filming and effects ===
"The Wedding of River Song" was one of the last episodes filmed for the series; 29 April 2011 was the last day of filming. However, a scene from "Let's Kill Hitler" was delayed and shot on 11 July 2011, making that the last day of filming for the series. American television hostess Meredith Vieira recorded her report of Churchill's return to the Buckingham Senate in front of a green screen while filming a segment for The Today Show's "Anchors Abroad" segment in May 2011.

Mark Gatiss, who played Gantok, was credited in this episode under the pseudonym "Rondo Haxton", a homage to the American horror actor Rondo Hatton on whom the character's look was based; Gatiss underwent prosthetics to play the part. Gatiss, who has written for Doctor Who, also played Professor Richard Lazarus in "The Lazarus Experiment" (2007) and provided the voice of Danny Boy in "Victory of the Daleks".

The cast found working with the eye patches strange as they had to act with one eye; Alex Kingston remarked that it made her "slightly dizzy". Karen Gillan was allowed to fire a specially-made machine gun used for films. Churchill's Buckingham Senate was filmed in Cardiff's City Council building. The script called for an Indiana Jones style tunnel for the Headless Monks' chamber, but as that kind of location was not available in Cardiff a set was built instead. The skulls were hand-crafted and required a lot of preparation, so it was one of the first things started for the episode's production.

== Broadcast and reception ==
"The Wedding of River Song" was first broadcast in the United Kingdom on BBC One on 1 October 2011 and on the same date in the United States on BBC America. Overnight ratings showed that the episode was watched by 6.1 million viewers, the third most-watched programme of the evening and an improvement upon preceding weeks of Doctor Who as well as the previous series finale. Final consolidated figures by the Broadcasters' Audience Research Board were 7.67 million viewers, the seventh highest for BBC One and the second most-watched programme for 1 October. It was given an Appreciation Index of 86, placing it in the "excellent" category. However it was the lowest rated finale since the revival of Doctor Who, with the others scoring an AI of 88 to 91.

=== Critical reception ===
The episode received mostly positive reviews from critics, with some reservations over the resolution and character interactions. Dan Martin of The Guardian gave a positive review, believing that the episode "moves along the bigger, 50-year story and effectively reboots the show". He particularly praised it for being simplistic, as well as the visuals of all history running together at once. Rachel Tarley, writing for Metro, praising the "gripping race" against time and noting that the script was "snappy and witty throughout, but the episode had its eerie and touching moments where necessary, too". The A.V. Club's Keith Phipps gave the episode an A, calling it "pretty close to a perfect season finale" for those not looking for all of the answers. Morgan Jeffery of Digital Spy wrote, "As a piece of Saturday night entertainment, it works — packed full of strong performances, stunning visuals and sharp dialogue. And as the resolution to a series-long arc, it's mostly satisfactory — though the episode poses as many questions as it answers."

Dave Golder of SFX gave the episode four-and-a-half out of five stars, explaining that he was in conflict whether to rate it five or four stars and calling it "about nine-tenths a great, great episode". He referred to the many concepts of the episode as a "sumptuous confection made mostly out of the finest ingredients" and found the Teselecta resolution a "cool twist" at first, but it meant "the whole episode is just an elaborate version of the classic Star Trek: Voyager alternate timeline shtick complete with reset button". IGN's Matt Risley rated "The Wedding of River Song" 8.5 out of 10, writing it "managed to tie together plot threads and character arcs without too much Deus Ex Maguffiny predictability and with a whole host of trademark sci-fi spectacle to boot". Though he thought the wedding "felt a little too rushed to leave any lingering emotional aftertaste", he praised other emotional moments in the episode and said the fact that everyone thinks the Doctor is dead will help the show explore a new angle.

Gavin Fuller of The Daily Telegraph called it an "uneven ending"; he praised it for being "visually clever" and liked the way the Silence were handled, but thought the Teselecta solution was "a bit of a cop-out". Neela Debnath of The Independent was displeased with the episode, calling it a "brainteaser" that "refused to tie up the loose ends neatly", and that as a finale it was "underwhelming in terms of drama and overwhelming in terms of information". However, she praised the fact that Moffat appears to be spreading storylines over several series, believing it "strengthens the show". On the other hand, HitFix's Alan Sepinwall thought that the resolutions from the wedding on were "excellent", but felt it could have done without another alternate universe, as it was similar to the previous finale "The Big Bang". Maureen Ryan of TV Squad criticised the episode for having too many "bells and whistles" which undermined the emotional moments, especially the wedding, which she did not believe showed that the Doctor was really in love with River. However, she did enjoy "callbacks" to previous episodes such as Churchill and Amy and Rory's relationship. Charlie Jane Anders of io9 thought it was better than the previous finale, "The Big Bang", as there were more answers, fun, and a satisfying resolution. However, she was critical of the reason River had to kill the Doctor as well as their relationship, and believed that Amy's killing Madame Kovarian was "no substitute" for Amy's dealing with what Kovarian had done to her child.
