= Doctor Who Confidential =

British documentary series

- The Doctor Who Confidential logo used in 2011 for series 6
- Genre: Documentary
- Based on: Doctor Who by: Sydney Newman, C. E. Webber, and Donald Wilson
- Narrated by: Simon Pegg; Mark Gatiss; Anthony Head; Noel Clarke; Alex Price; Russell Tovey
- Theme music composer: Murray Gold
- Opening theme: Doctor Who Confidential theme
- Ending theme: Doctor Who Confidential theme
- Country of origin: United Kingdom
- Original language: English
- No. of series: 6
- No. of episodes: 102

Production
- Producer: Gillane Seaborne
- Camera setup: Multi-camera
- Running time: 30 min (2005–2006); 45 min (2007–2011); 5–15 min (Cutdowns)

Original release
- Network: BBC Three; BBC One; BBC Two Wales; BBC HD; BBC America; CBBC
- Release: 26 March 2005 – 1 October 2011

Related
- Doctor Who Extra (2014–2017); Doctor Who: The Fan Show (2015–2018); Doctor Who; Torchwood Declassified; Doctor Who: Unleashed (2023–)

Doctor Who Confidential is a documentary series created by the British Broadcasting Corporation (BBC) to complement the revival of the long-running British science fiction television series Doctor Who. Each episode was broadcast on BBC Three on Saturdays, immediately after the broadcast of the weekly television episode on BBC One. The first and second series episodes ran 30 minutes each, while the third series onwards ran 45 minutes. BBC Three also broadcast a cut-down edition of the programme, lasting 15 minutes, shown after the repeats on Sundays and Fridays and after the weekday evening repeats of earlier seasons. Confidential received its own version of the Doctor Who theme tune, at least three different versions of the theme appeared in the series.

In September 2011, the BBC announced the cancellation of the series as a cost-cutting measure. Fans attempted to reverse the decision using an online petition. The decision was criticised by writers for the show and the incumbent Doctor, Matt Smith.

In February 2013, Doctor Who Confidential was voted the best BBC Three show of all time in a Radio Times poll on their website.

== Synopsis ==
The series is described as focusing on the human element of the series, Confidential features behind-the-scenes footage on the making of Doctor Who through clips and interviews with the cast, production crew and other people, including those who have participated in the television series over the years of its existence. Each episode deals with a different topic, and in most cases refers to the Doctor Who episode that preceded it. There have also been several episodes of Doctor Who Confidential broadcast apart from the showing of Doctor Who episodes.

== Narrators ==
- Simon Pegg (series 1)
- Mark Gatiss (series 2)
- Anthony Head (series 3, 4, 2009–2010 specials)
- Noel Clarke (2009–2010 specials, episode "Desert Storm" only.)
- Alex Price (series 5)
- Russell Tovey (series 6)

"Greatest Moments", the "2010 specials", and "My Sarah Jane" primarily consisted of interviews and clips from the series featuring no primary host.

== Episodes ==
=== Series overview ===
The following table dictates the season or series in question; singular specials are not included in episode counts. Not all networks listed aired every episode, a number of them only broadcast specific specials.

Series	Episodes	Originally released		
Series	Episodes	First released	Last released	Network
1	13	26 March 2005	18 June 2005	BBC Three; BBC One; BBC Two Wales; BBC HD; BBC America; CBBC
2	13	9 April 2006	8 July 2006	BBC Three; BBC One; BBC Two Wales; BBC HD; BBC America; CBBC
3	13	31 March 2007	30 June 2007	BBC Three; BBC One; BBC Two Wales; BBC HD; BBC America; CBBC
4	13	5 April 2008	5 July 2008	BBC Three; BBC One; BBC Two Wales; BBC HD; BBC America; CBBC
Specials	4	11 April 2009	1 January 2010	BBC Three; BBC One; BBC Two Wales; BBC HD; BBC America; CBBC
Greatest Moments	3	20 August 2009	3 September 2009	BBC Three; BBC One; BBC Two Wales; BBC HD; BBC America; CBBC
5	13	3 April 2010	26 June 2010	BBC Three; BBC One; BBC Two Wales; BBC HD; BBC America; CBBC
Specials	2	17 April 2010	6 September 2010	BBC Three; BBC One; BBC Two Wales; BBC HD; BBC America; CBBC
My Sarah Jane		23 April 2011		BBC Three; BBC One; BBC Two Wales; BBC HD; BBC America; CBBC
6	13	23 April 2011	1 October 2011	BBC Three; BBC One; BBC Two Wales; BBC HD; BBC America; CBBC

=== Series 1 (2005) ===
The first season was narrated by Simon Pegg (who played the Editor in "The Long Game") and produced and directed by Gillane Seaborne, airing at 7.45 pm. New episodes were broadcast on BBC Three immediately following the broadcast of Doctor Who. Two documentary specials were made for broadcast on BBC One, incorporating material from the Confidential episodes. The first, Doctor Who: A New Dimension, was broadcast on the evening of the first episode "Rose," and was narrated by David Tennant prior to his being named as the Tenth Doctor. The second, Doctor Who: The Ultimate Guide, was broadcast immediately prior to the final episode "The Parting of the Ways," and was narrated by Pegg. These episodes were not given the Confidential title, and are therefore separate from the series proper. In addition, the production team made a special DVD-only episode of the series for release on the set. This episode contained behind-the-scenes information on "The Christmas Invasion."

No. overall	No. in series	Title	Doctor Who episode	Original release date
1	1	"Bringing Back the Doctor"	"Rose"	26 March 2005
2	2	"The Good, the Bad and the Ugly"	"The End of the World"	2 April 2005
3	3	"TARDIS Tales"	"The Unquiet Dead"	9 April 2005
4	4	"I Get a Side-Kick Out of You"	"Aliens of London"	16 April 2005
5	5	"Why on Earth?"	"World War Three"	23 April 2005
6	6	"Dalek"	"Dalek"	30 April 2005
7	7	"The Dark Side"	"The Long Game"	7 May 2005
8	8	"Time Trouble"	"Father's Day"	14 May 2005
9	9	"Special Effects"	"The Empty Child"	21 May 2005
10	10	"Weird Science"	"The Doctor Dances"	28 May 2005
11	11	"Unsung Heroes and Violent Death"	"Boom Town"	4 June 2005
12	12	"The World of Who"	"Bad Wolf"	11 June 2005
13	13	"The Last Battle"	"The Parting of the Ways"	18 June 2005

=== Series 2 (2006) ===
A second season of Doctor Who Confidential was commissioned to accompany the 2006 series. Mark Gatiss replaced Pegg as narrator. Episodes continued to be broadcast on BBC Three along with a documentary special that was made for broadcast on BBC One on the day of the 2006 Christmas Special.

No. overall	No. in series	Title	Doctor Who episode	Original release date
16	1	"Backstage at Christmas"	"The Christmas Invasion"	—
17	S3	"One Year On"	—	9 April 2006
18	2	"New New Doctor"	"New Earth"	15 April 2006
19	3	"Fear Factor"	"Tooth and Claw"	22 April 2006
20	4	"Friends Reunited"	"School Reunion"	29 April 2006
21	5	"Script to Screen"	"The Girl in the Fireplace"	6 May 2006
22	6	"Cybermen"	"Rise of the Cybermen"	13 May 2006
23	7	"From Zero to Hero"	"The Age of Steel"	20 May 2006
24	8	"The Writer's Tale"	"The Idiot's Lantern"	27 May 2006
25	9	"You've Got the Look"	"The Impossible Planet"	3 June 2006
26	10	"Myths and Legends"	"The Satan Pit"	10 June 2006
27	11	"The New World of Who"	"Love & Monsters"	17 June 2006
28	12	"The Fright Stuff"	"Fear Her"	24 June 2006
29	13	"Welcome to Torchwood"	"Army of Ghosts"	1 July 2006
30	14	"Finale"	"Doomsday"	8 July 2006

=== Series 3 (2007) ===
Anthony Head (who played Mr Finch/Brother Lassar in "School Reunion") replaced Gatiss as narrator for this series, whilst David Tennant did the entirety of the series' eleventh episode himself. The episode running length was increased to 45 minutes. A 30-minute special was shown as part of the BBC's arts' season, it was narrated by Tom Baker. After the 2007 Christmas Special, an episode was broadcast on BBC Three, again narrated by Anthony Head.

No. overall	No. in series	Title	Doctor Who episode	Original release date
31	1	"Music and Monsters"	"Doctor Who: A Celebration", "The Runaway Bride"	25 December 2006
32	S4	"On Show - Designs on Doctor Who"	"The Runaway Bride", Torchwood	26 December 2006
33	2	"Meet Martha Jones"	"Smith and Jones"	31 March 2007
34	3	"Stage Fright"	"The Shakespeare Code"	7 April 2007
35	4	"Are We There Yet?"	"Gridlock"	14 April 2007
36	5	"A New York Story"	"Daleks in Manhattan"	21 April 2007
37	6	"Making Manhattan"	"Evolution of the Daleks"	28 April 2007
38	7	"Monsters Inc."	"The Lazarus Experiment"	5 May 2007
39	8	"Space Craft"	"42"	19 May 2007
40	9	"Alter Ego"	"Human Nature"	26 May 2007
41	10	"Bad Blood"	"The Family of Blood"	2 June 2007
42	11	"Do You Remember the First Time?"	"Blink"	9 June 2007
43	12	"Ello, 'Ello, 'Ello"	"Utopia"	16 June 2007
44	13	"The Saxon Mystery"	"The Sound of Drums"	23 June 2007
45	14	"The Valiant Quest"	"Last of the Time Lords"	30 June 2007
46	S5	"Time Crash Confidential"	"Time Crash"	10 November 2007

=== Series 4 (2008) ===
Anthony Head narrated the series for the second year in a row. Each episode had its own unique title sequence, with behind-the-scenes shots from that week's episode of Doctor Who. The 2008 Christmas special was the first to be accompanied by its own Confidential episode. The final episode reviewed all 10 previous incarnations of the Doctor, and exclusively revealed Matt Smith as the actor who would portray the then-upcoming Eleventh Doctor. A special episode of Confidential, going behind the scenes at the proms, was available by red button on 1 January 2009.

No. overall	No. in series	Title	Doctor Who episode	Original release date
47	1	"Confidential at Christmas"	"The Christmas Invasion", "The Runaway Bride", "Voyage of the Damned"	25 December 2007
48	2	"A Noble Return"	"Partners in Crime"	5 April 2008
49	3	"The Italian Job"	"The Fires of Pompeii"	12 April 2008
50	4	"Oods and Ends"	"Planet of the Ood"	19 April 2008
51	5	"Send in the Clones"	"The Sontaran Stratagem"	26 April 2008
52	6	"Sontar-Ha!"	"The Poison Sky"	3 May 2008
53	7	"Sins of the Fathers"	"The Doctor's Daughter"	10 May 2008
54	8	"Nemesis"	"The Unicorn and the Wasp"	17 May 2008
55	9	"Shadow Play"	"Silence in the Library"	31 May 2008
56	10	"River Runs Deep""	"Forest of the Dead"	7 June 2008
57	11	"Look Who's Talking"	"Midnight"	14 June 2008
58	12	"Here Come the Girls"	"Turn Left"	21 June 2008
59	13	"Friends and Foe"	"The Stolen Earth"	28 June 2008
60	14	"End of an Era"	"Journey's End"	5 July 2008
61	15	"Christmas 2008 Special"	"The Next Doctor"	25 December 2008
62	S6	"Top 5 Christmas Moments"	"The Unquiet Dead", "The Christmas Invasion", "The Runaway Bride", "Voyage of the Damned", "The Next Doctor"	25 December 2008
63	S7	"At The Proms"	2008 Doctor Who prom	1 January 2009
64	S8	"The Eleventh Doctor"	Revealing of Matt Smith as the Eleventh Doctor	3 January 2009

=== Specials (2009–2010) ===
The first Confidential edition attached to the 2009 specials, covering "Planet of the Dead", was narrated by Noel Clarke, although Anthony Head returned to narrate "Is There Life on Mars?". This special featured improved graphics in its opening and closing credits sequences. Head continued to narrate the Christmas and New Year specials.

No. overall	No. in series	Title	Doctor Who episode	Original release date
65	1	"Desert Storm"	"Planet of the Dead"	11 April 2009
69	2	"Is There Life on Mars?"	"The Waters of Mars"	15 November 2009
70	3	"Lords and Masters"	"The End of Time", Part 1	25 December 2009
71	4	"Allons-y!"	"The End of Time", Part 2	1 January 2010

=== Greatest Moments (2009) ===
No. overall	No. in series	Title	Doctor Who episode	Original release date
66	GM1	"Greatest Moments: The Doctor"	Doctor Who series 1–4	20 August 2009
67	GM2	"Greatest Moments: The Companions"	Doctor Who series 1–4	27 August 2009
68	GM3	"Greatest Moments: The Enemies"	Doctor Who series 1–4	3 September 2009

=== Series 5 (2010) ===
Alex Price is the narrator for this series.

No. overall	No. in series	Title	Doctor Who episode	Original release date
72	1	"Call Me the Doctor"	"The Eleventh Hour"	3 April 2010
73	2	"All About the Girl"	"The Beast Below"	10 April 2010
74	3	"War Games"	"Victory of the Daleks"	17 April 2010
75	4	"Eyes Wide Open"	"The Time of the Angels"	24 April 2010
76	5	"Blinded By the Light"	"Flesh and Stone"	1 May 2010
77	6	"Death in Venice"	"The Vampires of Venice"	8 May 2010
78	7	"Arthurian Legend"	"Amy's Choice"	15 May 2010
79	8	"After Effects"	"The Hungry Earth"	22 May 2010
80	9	"What Goes on Tour..."	"Cold Blood"	29 May 2010
81	10	"A Brush with Genius"	"Vincent and the Doctor"	5 June 2010
82	11	"Extra Time"	"The Lodger"	12 June 2010
83	12	"Alien Abduction"	"The Pandorica Opens"	19 June 2010
84	13	"Out of Time"	"The Big Bang"	26 June 2010

=== Specials (2010) ===
No. overall	No. in series	Title	Doctor Who episode	Original release date
85	AS1	"The Ultimate Guide"	Doctor Who series 1–5	17 April 2010
86	S9	"Backstage at the Proms"	2010 Doctor Who prom	6 September 2010

=== My Sarah Jane: A Tribute to Elisabeth Sladen (2011) ===
No. overall	No. in series	Title	Doctor Who episode	Original release date
87	EST	"My Sarah Jane: A Tribute to Elisabeth Sladen"	Commemoration for the late Elisabeth Sladen	23 April 2011

=== Series 6 (2011) ===
A new series of Confidential started broadcasting on 23 April 2011 with a brand new title sequence. Russell Tovey continued to narrate the episodes. The final episode, which aired on 1 October 2011, incorporated a mini-episode, Death is the Only Answer, written by a group of schoolchildren who won a contest co-sponsored by Confidential.

No. overall	No. in series	Title	Doctor Who episode	Original release date
88	1	"Christmas Special 2010"	"A Christmas Carol"	25 December 2010
89	2	"Coming to America"	"The Impossible Astronaut"	23 April 2011
90	3	"Breaking the Silence"	"Day of the Moon"	30 April 2011
91	4	"Ship Ahoy!"	"The Curse of the Black Spot"	7 May 2011
92	5	"Bigger on the Inside"	"The Doctor's Wife"	14 May 2011
93	6	"Double Trouble"	"The Rebel Flesh"	21 May 2011
94	7	"Take Two"	"The Almost People"	28 May 2011
95	8	"The Born Identity"	"A Good Man Goes to War"	4 June 2011
96	9	"River Runs Wild"	"Let's Kill Hitler"	27 August 2011
97	10	"About a Boy"	"Night Terrors"	3 September 2011
98	11	"What Dreams May Come"	"The Girl Who Waited"	10 September 2011
99	12	"Heartbreak Hotel"	"The God Complex"	17 September 2011
100	13	"Open All Hours"	"Closing Time"	24 September 2011
101	14	"When Time Froze"	"The Wedding of River Song"	1 October 2011
102	S10	"The Nights' Tale"	"Space" and "Time", "Night and the Doctor"	—

== Broadcast ==
=== Series 1–2 ===
In addition to being broadcast on BBC Three, each episode of Confidential was also made available for viewing on the Doctor Who Confidential website. Initially, repeat airings of the series were the full length episodes; however, beginning with Episode 6, BBC Three broadcast fifteen-minute versions, entitled Doctor Who Confidential: Cut Down, containing only the new series-related footage were released on the Series 1 DVD box set. The full versions of the episodes have since been made available on BBC iPlayer.

For series two, a special episode of the programme was produced for BBC's Doctor Who Night on 9 April 2006. Due to a wide range of schedule changes that either delayed or altered transmission of Doctor Who, the series aired at various times during its run. Unlike the first series, no episodes were webcast. These were also released on the DVD in edited-down format (once again subtitled Cut Down); the first episode of the season, "One Year On", was not released to DVD. A documentary special that was made for broadcast on BBC One on the day of "The Runaway Bride". The special was broadcast with the "Confidential" title (albeit with "Christmas Special" attached), opening theme, and unique titles (with images from "The Runaway Bride") and followed the creation of the Doctor Who: A Celebration concert.

=== Series 3–4, and the 2009–2010 specials ===
The episode running length was increased to 45 minutes for the third series, with 30-minute and 15-minute versions also prepared for broadcast. The 15-minute versions were available for download from the official website. As per previous seasons, all regular episodes were edited down into shorter versions for inclusion on the DVD release; for the first time, however, a complete Confidential episode was included on the DVD release: the "Music & Monsters" special. One episode, covering the making of the Children in Need special "Time Crash" was posted on the Children in Need website after the scene's airing. A 30-minute special, created by the Confidential team, was shown as part of the BBC's arts' season, entitled "On Show - Designs on Doctor Who", was first broadcast on BBC Two Wales. After "Voyage of the Damned", an episode was broadcast on BBC Three.

The 2008–10 specials were the first Confidential editions to be broadcast on BBC HD as well as BBC Three. The series also made a move to a high definition format. The full episodes of Confidential relating to the 2008–10 specials are available for immediate broadcast through Amazon Prime Video in the United States with an Amazon Prime subscription. These are the only full episodes of Confidential legally available for video-on-demand streaming. A 30-minute "best moments" feature was included on the DVD release of the Cybermen Collection.

=== Series 5–6, the 2010 specials, and the My Sarah Jane special ===
Episodes continued to be broadcast on BBC Three and BBC HD for series five and six. Similar to previous series, versions of the episodes entitled Cut Down were released on the DVD sets however, the full episode of Confidential relating to A Christmas Carol was released instead. Two specials were created between series five and six, on which was made specifically for broadcast on BBC America. A third special commemorating the death of Elisabeth Sladen was produced by the Confidential team as well and was aired on CBBC.

== Cancellation ==
On 28 September 2011, a few days prior to the broadcast of the Confidential episode to accompany season 6 finale "The Wedding of River Song", BBC controller Zai Bennett announced the cancellation of the series as a cost-cutting measure. Within 24 hours of the show being officially cancelled, pages on both Facebook and Twitter were established in an attempt to save it, both with links to an online petition that gained over 20,000 signatures within the same period, and eventually garnered over 50,000. People involved with the show such as writers Neil Gaiman ("The Doctor's Wife") and Tom MacRae ("The Girl Who Waited") expressed their concern with the axing of the programme, as did lead actor Matt Smith.

=== Online featurettes ===
In 2012, seventh series executive producer Caroline Skinner announced that smaller behind-the-scenes featurettes would be released on the BBC's Doctor Who website to make up for Confidential's cancellation. The majority of these featurettes last for less than 5 minutes.

==== Series 7 (2012–2013) ====
No.	Title	Doctor Who episode	Original release date
1	"Steven Moffat: The Return of the Daleks"	"Asylum of the Daleks"	29 August 2012
2	"Life Cycle of a Dalek"	"Asylum of the Daleks"	1 September 2012
3	"Raptors, Robots and a Bumpy Ride"	"Dinosaurs on a Spaceship"	8 September 2012
4	"Wild, Wild…Spain?"	"A Town Called Mercy"	15 September 2012
5	"A Writer's Tale"	"The Power of Three"	22 September 2012
6	"A Fall with Grace"	"The Angels Take Manhattan"	29 September 2012
7	"The Last Days of the Ponds"	"The Angels Take Manhattan"	1 October 2012
8	"Clara's First Christmas"	"The Snowmen"	25 December 2012
9	"Behind the Scenes of The Bells of Saint John"	"The Bells of Saint John"	30 March 2013
10	"Behind the Scenes of The Rings of Akhaten"	"The Rings of Akhaten"	6 April 2013
11	"Behind the Scenes of Cold War"	"Cold War"	13 April 2013
12	"Behind the Scenes of Hide"	"Hide"	20 April 2013
13	"Behind the Scenes of Journey to the Centre of the TARDIS"	"Journey to the Centre of the TARDIS"	27 April 2013
14	"Behind the Scenes of The Crimson Horror"	"The Crimson Horror"	4 May 2013
15	"Behind the Scenes of Nightmare in Silver"	"Nightmare in Silver"	11 May 2013
16	"Behind the Scenes of The Name of the Doctor"	"The Name of the Doctor"	18 May 2013

==== Specials (2013) ====
No.	Title	Doctor Who episode	Original release date
1	"The Day of the Doctor: Behind the Lens"	"The Day of the Doctor"	23 November 2013
2	"Doctor Who: The Surprise – Paul McGann"	"The Night of the Doctor"	4 December 2013
3	"The Time of the Doctor: Behind the Lens"	"The Time of the Doctor"	26 December 2013

=== Post-cancellation ===
On 20 August 2014, it was announced that a series of 10-minute behind-the-scenes featurettes would accompany the twelve episodes of the eighth series, under the title of Doctor Who Extra. These featurettes were made available on the BBC's iPlayer and Red Button services.

Doctor Who: Unleashed was officially announced in September 2023, and follows every new episode of Doctor Who, starting with the 60th anniversary specials in 30 minute episodes on BBC Three, hosted by Newsbeat presenter Steffan Powell.

== Other shows in Confidential format ==
Following the popularity of Doctor Who Confidential, Doctor Who spin-off Torchwood was produced with its own set of backstage documentaries entitled Torchwood Declassified. The BBC also broadcast Heroes Unmasked in the same format, narrated by Anthony Head, to complement the NBC series Heroes on BBC Two, Merlin: Secrets and Magic, narrated by Greg James, to accompany the second series of the BBC One drama Merlin, and Greek Uncovered, narrated by Fearne Cotton, for the comedy drama Greek when it was shown on BBC Three. When Big Finish Doctor Who audio dramas were broadcast on BBC Radio 7, they were followed by a 15-minute backstage programme called Beyond the Vortex.
