= The Rebel Flesh =

Episode of Doctor Who

217a – "The Rebel Flesh"
- Doctor Who episode

Cast
- Doctor: Matt Smith – Eleventh Doctor
- Companions: Karen Gillan – Amy Pond; Arthur Darvill – Rory Williams
- Others: Mark Bonnar – Jimmy; Marshall Lancaster – Buzzer; Sarah Smart – Jennifer; Raquel Cassidy – Cleaves; Leon Vickers – Dicken; Frances Barber – Eye Patch Lady

Production
- Directed by: Julian Simpson
- Written by: Matthew Graham
- Produced by: Marcus Wilson
- Executive producers: Steven Moffat; Piers Wenger; Beth Willis
- Music by: Murray Gold
- Production code: 2.5
- Series: Series 6
- Running time: 1st of 2-part story, 45 minutes
- First broadcast: 21 May 2011

Chronology
| ← Preceded by "The Doctor's Wife" | Followed by → "The Almost People" |

"The Rebel Flesh" is the fifth episode of the sixth series of the British science fiction television series Doctor Who, which was first broadcast on 21 May 2011 on BBC One and on BBC America in the United States. It is the first episode of a two-part story written by Matthew Graham and directed by Julian Simpson, concluded in "The Almost People".

In the episode, the TARDIS is hit by a solar storm, sending the Doctor (Matt Smith) and his companions Amy Pond (Karen Gillan) and Rory Williams (Arthur Darvill) to a monastery on an island on Earth in the 22nd century, which has been converted into a factory to pump acid off the island. To prevent death from the acid, the workers have utilised a "programmable matter" called the Flesh, which creates a doppelgänger (called "Ganger") controlled by the worker. As the solar storm hits, the Gangers become independent, and the Doctor, Amy and Rory must work to prevent the two groups from breaking into a war.

Showrunner Steven Moffat specifically asked Graham to write the episodes about "avatars that rebel", although the Flesh and the monastery were Graham's original ideas. The episode was filmed in the late months of 2010 with some location filming at Caerphilly Castle and Cardiff Castle to represent the monastery. Prosthetics were used to create the Gangers' facial features, while doubles of the actors were used for scenes in which a character and their Ganger were both in a scene, but did not both show their face.

The episode was seen by 7.35 million viewers in the UK and achieved an Appreciation Index of 85. Reviewers were generally positive about the episode; some praised the setting and characters but others commented that the story had not developed enough even though it was only the first part. The computer-generated effects used for one scene were also disapproved of by a couple of reviewers.

== Plot ==
=== Synopsis ===
The TARDIS is caught in the first waves of a "solar tsunami" and materialises on Earth in the 22nd century. The Eleventh Doctor, Amy and Rory find themselves on a remote island, where a factory housed in a former 13th century castle monastery pumps a valuable, highly corrosive acid to the mainland. The skeleton crew of the factory uses a self-replicating fluid called the Flesh from which they create doppelgängers of themselves, colloquially called "Gangers". The crew control the Gangers from special harnesses to operate in the hazardous environment of the factory. The Doctor, initially posing as a weatherman, fears the worst part of the solar tsunami will strike the solar-powered factory soon, threatening those still remaining, and offers to take the crew in his TARDIS. The foreman, Miranda Cleaves, refuses to shut down the factory until she receives orders from the mainland. As the solar storm begins, the Doctor races to disconnect the solar collector, but the tsunami hits the castle, throwing the Doctor off the tower and knocking everyone inside unconscious for an hour.

When the crew awaken, they find themselves out of the control beds with no sign of the Gangers. They soon discover that the Gangers have gained sentience and two Gangers are amongst them, posing as Cleaves and Jennifer, when the two give themselves away by turning pale-white. Jennifer also exhibits the ability to contort and stretch her body well beyond natural human limits. The Jennifer Ganger struggles with her new identity and befriends Rory who has begun to demonstrate an emotional attachment to her. The Cleaves Ganger works in secret with the other Gangers to try to kill the real humans, as the human Cleaves plans to kill the Gangers. The Doctor attempts to reunite the two sides but fails when the human Cleaves kills the Ganger Buzzer. The Gangers plan an attack, and the Doctor accuses Cleaves of killing a living being which Cleaves refuses to acknowledge. The Ganger Jennifer hunts her human counterpart to kill her. The Doctor determines that in a monastery, the safest place to be is the chapel, and directs everyone there. The Gangers, in acid-protection suits, bear down on the chapel. Against Amy's wishes, Rory separates from the group to find Jennifer after he hears her screams. Whilst barricading themselves in the chapel, Amy and the Doctor discover a Ganger version of the Doctor.

=== Continuity ===
"The Almost People" confirms that the Doctor came to the base to examine the Flesh in its early stage in order to humanely sever its connection to Amy, who was replaced by a Ganger avatar prior to the beginning of the series. He is once more seen performing a pregnancy scan on Amy which, as before, cannot come to a conclusion as to whether she is pregnant. The "Eye Patch Lady" also makes another brief appearance to Amy, similar to those in "Day of the Moon" and "The Curse of the Black Spot". Her identity is revealed in "The Almost People" and she plays a larger part in "A Good Man Goes to War" and "The Wedding of River Song".

== Production ==
=== Writing ===
Matthew Graham was originally to write a single episode for the previous series, but withdrew because he did not have enough time to write the script. He then received an e-mail from showrunner Steven Moffat, who asked him to write for the next series; Graham agreed. When the two met, Moffat said he would like the episodes to lead into the mid-series finale and that it should deal with "avatars that rebel". Initially worried this may seem too similar to the film Avatar, Graham went on to create the Flesh. Graham wanted the Gangers to be scary, but not monsters who wanted "to take over the world for the sake of it". He wanted them to appear relatable to the audience as they were humans who deserved rights. Moffat suggested that the avatars work in a factory; attempting to make it different from other factories featured in Doctor Who, Graham proposed to set the story in a monastery, of which Moffat greatly approved. The monastery was inspired by the film The Name of the Rose, while the Gangers were influenced by The Thing; Graham described it as "The Thing in the context of The Name of the Rose".

In the early drafts of the script, there were "so many copies of people running around the place" which made the story too confusing, so Graham and the production crew worked to make it more rational. The episode also contains a subplot in which Rory helps and protects Jennifer as she is scared by the Gangers, which proved a twist in Amy and Rory's relationship. Actor Karen Gillan enjoyed the twist. Amy had previously always had Rory "in the palm of her hand" and a different side of the character was shown as she experienced the same emotions Rory felt when she seemed interested in the Doctor. Actor Arthur Darvill also thought it gave Rory a chance to "man up" and be a hero by protecting someone.

=== Filming and effects ===
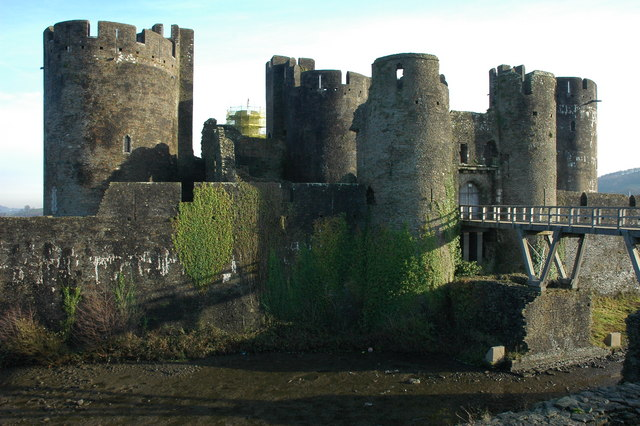
Caerphilly Castle, which was used as the filming location for the monastery featured in the episode.

The read-through for "The Rebel Flesh" and "The Almost People" took place on 12 November 2010. It was then filmed around late November and early December. The cold temperatures at the time were a challenge and caused discomfort. The crew were concerned that the cast, particularly the three lead actors, would fall ill as their costumes were not designed for such weather conditions. Even so, the cast remained healthy. Scenes outside and inside the monastery were filmed at Caerphilly Castle, previously used in Doctor Who in "The End of Time" and "The Vampires of Venice".

The actors each played their respective Gangers, with prosthetics applied to their faces for when the duplicates' faces reverted to the original material of the Flesh. Moffat wanted the Gangers to appear like "eyeball matter": white with small capillaries running through them. For the scenes in which both the character and their respective Ganger was in the same shot, a double for each of the actors was used. Most of the shots showed either the character or their Ganger speaking over their counterpart's shoulder, as only the backs of the doubles' heads were made to look similar to the actors.

The episode also contains several tracks of contemporary music. In the beginning when Amy and Rory are playing darts inside in the TARDIS and the Doctor runs a pregnancy scan on Amy, the song "Supermassive Black Hole" by Muse is playing in the background. The Gangers also play "You Don't Have to Say You Love Me" by Dusty Springfield.

== Broadcast and reception ==
"The Rebel Flesh" was first broadcast on BBC One on 21 May 2011 and on the same date in the United States on BBC America. In the UK, the episode achieved an overnight rating of 5.7 million with an audience share of 29.3%. When consolidated ratings were calculated, it was reported that 7.35 million viewers had watched the episode, making it the sixth most-watched episode on BBC One for the week. It received an Appreciation Index of 85, considered by the BBC to be "excellent".

=== Critical reception ===
"The Rebel Flesh" received generally positive reviews by critics. Dan Martin, writing for The Guardian, said that "The Rebel Flesh" "is particularly satisfying" though it seemed that not much had happened due to its being the first part of a two-part story. He praised Graham's "believable world" and "well-drawn" characters of Cleaves, Buzzer and Jennifer. He later rated it the seventh best episode of the series, though the finale was not included in the list. The Telegraph reviewer Gavin Fuller called it "a very traditional-style Doctor Who story". He noted that Matt Smith gave a more restrained performance that suited the feel of the episode, and also praised the advantage taken with the location filming for the monastery. Radio Times's critic Patrick Mulkern considered the episode to be an improvement from Graham's only other Doctor Who episode, "Fear Her", though it had "failed to enthral" him. In contrast to Martin, Mulkern said that Graham's characters were not "showing many life signs yet" with the exception of Jennifer, who was "marginally sympathetic".

IGN's Matt Risley rated the episode 8 out of 10, saying it delivered "a solid and traditional Whovian tale, albeit one at its best", though it was "nothing groundbreaking" yet. He went on to praise the supporting cast that "managed to sell both their flawed human originals and their progressively bonkers ganger counterparts" as well as the setting. However, he questioned Rory's willingness to protect Jennifer, as he thought Rory would have learned from his experiences with death to be more careful. Morgan Jeffery of Digital Spy gave the episode four out of five stars, saying that "The Rebel Flesh" "strikes a satisfying balance between the humorous and the horrific" from the cold open. He commended Graham for handling the two-part structure by using extra time to explore the characters and themes, and thought the highlight of the episode were Rory's scenes with Jennifer. However, he criticised the CGI used in some scenes, although he called the prosthetics used for the Gangers "impressive", as well as the episode for ending in "a damp squib of a cliffhanger" that was "clearly too telegraphed throughout the episode".

SFX magazine reviewer Richard Edwards gave the episode four out of five stars, saying it "looks fantastic" and praised the choice of the abbey as the factory, which blew "the cliché of a futuristic industrial setting apart immediately, and [made] you feel like you’re watching something new." Like Jeffery, he said the visual effects were "generally pretty good" but criticised the CGI used for Jennifer's special abilities. Keith Phipps on The A.V. Club graded it as a "B" and called it "just a pretty good episode". His complaint was that it "truly [felt] like half a story in the way the best Doctor Who two-parters don't", though he said it managed to plant intriguing strands for the conclusion.
