= Wuthering Heights (1998 film) =

- Directed by: David Skynner
- Written by: Neil McKay
- Based on: Wuthering Heights; 1847 novel by Emily Brontë
- Produced by: Louise Berridge; Jo Wright (executive producer); Rebecca Eaton (executive producer)
- Starring: Robert Cavanah; Orla Brady; Sarah Smart
- Music by: Warren Bennett
- Production companies: London Weekend Television; WGBH-TV
- Distributed by: ITV
- Release dates: 5 April 1998 (UK); 18 October 1998 (US)
- Running time: 112 minutes
- Country: United Kingdom
- Language: English

Wuthering Heights is a 1998 British television film directed by David Skynner and starring Robert Cavanah, Orla Brady, and Sarah Smart. It was produced by Jo Wright. It is based on the 1847 novel Wuthering Heights by Emily Brontë. The novel was adapted for the screen by Neil McKay. The film was released by ITV on 5 April 1998 in the United Kingdom and released by WGBH-TV on 18 October 1998 in the United States.

Four years later, Smart would star in Sparkhouse, a gender-reversed BBC adaptation of Wuthering Heights in which Smart played the Heathcliff role (renamed to Carol).

== Plot summary ==
Mr Earnshaw takes in Heathcliff, a mistreated foundling, and raises him alongside his stepsister Catherine. The two develop a romantic relationship, but Catherine ultimately decides to marry a wealthy man. Heathcliff becomes fixated on seeking revenge and this obsession carries over into the following generation.

== Cast ==
- Robert Cavanah as Heathcliff
- Peter Davison as Joseph Lockwood
- Orla Brady as Cathy Earnshaw
- Tom Georgeson as Joseph
- Matthew Macfadyen as Hareton Earnshaw
- Sarah Smart as Catherine Linton
- Kadie Savage as young Cathy Earnshaw
- Ken Kitson as Mr. Earnshaw
- Flora Montgomery as Isabella Linton
- Ian Shaw as Hindley Earnshaw
- Crispin Bonham-Carter as Edgar Linton
- David Maybrick as Gaddick
- Catherine Cheshire as Frances Earnshaw
- Polly Hemingway as Nelly Dean
