= The Doctor's Wife =

Episode of British TV's Doctor Who

216 – "The Doctor's Wife"
- Doctor Who episode
- The Doctor (Matt Smith) and Idris (Suranne Jones, left) pilot the makeshift TARDIS. This set was based on a Blue Peter contest-winning design produced by Susannah Leah, a 12-year-old viewer.

Cast
- Doctor: Matt Smith – Eleventh Doctor
- Companions: Karen Gillan – Amy Pond; Arthur Darvill – Rory Williams
- Others: Suranne Jones – Idris; Michael Sheen – Voice of House; Paul Kasey – Nephew; Adrian Schiller – Uncle; Elizabeth Berrington – Auntie

Production
- Directed by: Richard Clark
- Written by: Neil Gaiman
- Produced by: Sanne Wohlenberg
- Executive producers: Steven Moffat; Piers Wenger; Beth Willis
- Music by: Murray Gold
- Production code: 2.3
- Series: Series 6
- Running time: 45 minutes
- First broadcast: 14 May 2011

Chronology
← Preceded by "The Curse of the Black Spot"	Followed by → "The Rebel Flesh"

"The Doctor's Wife" is the fourth episode of the sixth series of the British science fiction television series Doctor Who, which was broadcast on 14 May 2011 in the United Kingdom, and later the same day in the United States. It was written by Neil Gaiman and directed by Richard Clark.

In the episode, an entity called House (voiced by Michael Sheen) lures the alien time traveller the Doctor (Matt Smith) and his companions Amy Pond (Karen Gillan) and Rory Williams (Arthur Darvill) to an asteroid outside the universe, by sending a distress call from a Time Lord to the Doctor's time machine, the TARDIS. House removes the matrix of the TARDIS and places it in the body of a woman named Idris (Suranne Jones), who proceeds to help the Doctor prevent House from escaping its pocket universe with the TARDIS.

"The Doctor's Wife" was originally intended to be produced as part of the previous series, but was pushed back due to budget constraints. Gaiman revised the script many times, having to add and remove characters and events as production saw fit. The episode was filmed in the autumn of 2010 and featured a makeshift TARDIS control room which was the design from a winner of a contest on the children's programme Blue Peter. The episode was seen by 7.97 million viewers in the UK and was met with positive reviews from critics, with praise for Jones's performance. The episode won the 2011 Ray Bradbury Award for Outstanding Dramatic Presentation and the 2012 Hugo Award for Best Dramatic Presentation, Short Form.

== Plot ==
=== Synopsis ===
The Eleventh Doctor, Amy and Rory follow a distress call, from a Time Lord named the Corsair, to an asteroid outside the universe. After landing in a junkyard, the TARDIS shuts down and its matrix disappears. The sentient asteroid, called House, removes the matrix, and places it in the body of a woman called Idris. The Doctor discovers the Corsair and hundreds of other Time Lords on the asteroid were murdered by House and that two inhabitants of the asteroid, Uncle and Auntie, are constructed from the body parts of Time Lords. Upon learning that the Doctor is the last Time Lord and that no more will ever arrive, House transfers its consciousness into the TARDIS to escape from the rift. Amy and Rory are trapped inside as the House-controlled TARDIS dematerialises. Uncle and Auntie are allowed to die.

The Doctor learns that Idris contains the TARDIS's matrix, and its personality, and that they can have a two-way conversation for the first time; she clarifies that she stole him, keeping herself unlocked in the museum on Gallifrey where he found her, so that she could explore the universe. (Note: The Doctor and Idris, with his plan to build a makeshift TARDIS console, are about to go to the junkyard. Before leaving he asks Idris what he should call her, and she replies "I think you call me... Sexy.") With minutes before her body fails, Idris reveals that House had stranded many TARDISes before, and that its pocket universe is hours away from collapsing. The Doctor and Idris work together to construct a makeshift TARDIS from scraps, and then pursue House. Aboard the Doctor's TARDIS, House threatens to kill Amy and Rory. He plays with their senses as they try to flee through the corridors, and then sends an Ood called Nephew after them. Idris makes a psychic connection with Rory to give him directions to a secondary control room, where he and Amy are able to lower the TARDIS shields. This allows the Doctor to land the makeshift TARDIS in the secondary control room, which atomises Nephew. House deletes the secondary control room as he prepares to break through the rift to the main universe, which the Doctor anticipates. The TARDIS's safety protocols transfer them to the main control room, where the dying Idris releases the TARDIS's matrix back to the TARDIS, destroying House. A remnant of the TARDIS's matrix, in Idris' body, states that she will not be able to speak to the Doctor again but will be there for him, finishing with "I love you." Idris's body then disappears as the TARDIS matrix is fully restored.

=== Continuity ===
The Doctor refers to altering the control room's appearance as changing the desktop theme, as the Fifth Doctor does in "Time Crash". Like the Third Doctor in Inferno (1970), the Doctor and Idris operate a TARDIS console without an outer TARDIS shell. The Doctor also jettisons TARDIS rooms to create thrust, as he had done previously in stories such as Logopolis (1981) and Castrovalva (1982). The Doctor admits he killed all of the Time Lords, alluding to the events of the Time War. In The War Games (1969), the Second Doctor contacted the Time Lords using a cube similar to those seen in this episode. The Doctor refers to himself as "a madman with a box", reprising Amy's and his own description of himself in "The Eleventh Hour". The Doctor refers to Nephew as "another Ood I failed to save"; in "The Satan Pit" the Doctor commented that he did not have time to save the Ood. Idris' cryptic words, "the only water in the forest is the river", are explained in the mid-series finale, "A Good Man Goes to War".

== Production ==
=== Writing ===
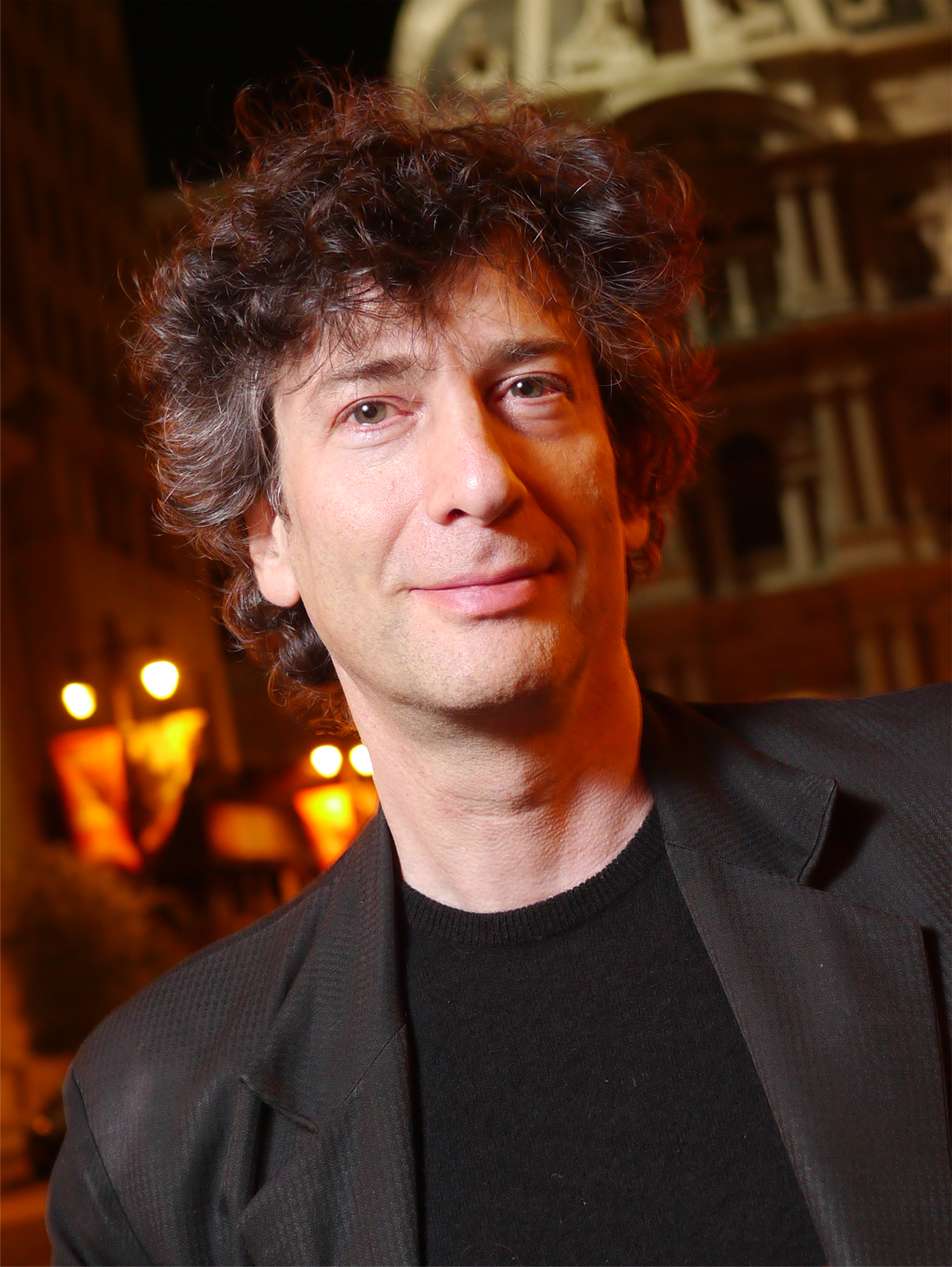
"The Doctor's Wife" is Neil Gaiman's first contribution to Doctor Who.

During a dinner with incoming executive producer Steven Moffat, writer Neil Gaiman asked Moffat if he could write an episode. In an interview Gaiman stated "I came up with something that was one of those things where you thought that nobody's done that before." The episode was originally titled "The House of Nothing" before Gaiman sat down to write it, but that was changed to "Bigger on the Inside". This title remained until about six weeks before the episode aired, but the crew was beginning to worry that "Bigger on the Inside" would give away the surprise that Idris was the TARDIS, so it was changed. "The Doctor's Wife" was also a fake title attached to the 1984 serial The Caves of Androzani; then-producer John Nathan-Turner had changed the title to that on his planning board in an attempt to weed out a suspected leak in his office.

Gaiman suggested they make an episode which centres on the TARDIS itself, which was not done before for the entire series since it began in 1963. The original plan focused on the idea of the Doctor being pursued by an enemy inside the TARDIS, but went through several subsequent changes; Gaiman changed the plan to focus on the companion due to the Doctor's knowledge of his ship making it too easy for him to escape his enemy, made the TARDIS the threat rather than just a specific alien to avoid making it a simple 'cat-and-mouse' game, and then included the idea of Idris to account for what happened to the TARDIS's mind during this attack. The central idea was a "what if" scenario to see what would happen if the Doctor and the TARDIS got to talk together. Moffat liked the idea of featuring the TARDIS as a woman, believing this to be the "ultimate love story" for the Doctor.

Gaiman began writing the episode before Matt Smith was even cast as the Eleventh Doctor; Gaiman had envisioned David Tennant's performance in the first draft, knowing Smith would play the Doctor differently. Despite this he had no issue writing the dialogue. The episode was originally slated for the eleventh episode of the fifth series. However, it was delayed to the sixth series because of budget issues; the eleventh episode would be replaced with "The Lodger". Even so, Gaiman was forced to operate with less money than he would have liked; for instance, he had to scrap a scene set in the TARDIS' swimming pool, and instead of being able to use a monster of his own design he had to use an Ood.

The move to the sixth series also meant Gaiman had to include Rory, who had ceased to exist in the original slot in the fifth series. With Rory included, Gaiman had to "reshape" much of the second half of the episode, featuring Amy being on the run in the TARDIS. In the original draft where Amy was the only companion, Gaiman added a "heartbreaking monologue" by the character, further stating "you get to see what it's like to be the companion from the companion's point of view, and she got to talk about essentially in that version how sad it is, in some ways. One day something will happen to her, she'll get married, she'll get eaten by monsters, she'll die, she'll get sick of this, but he'll go on forever." At a certain point, Gaiman became tired of rewriting drafts and asked Steven Moffat for help. Moffat wrote in what Gaiman called "several of [the episode's] best lines" and rapidly rewrote several scenes when budget problems harmed filming locations.

=== Casting ===
In September 2010, Suranne Jones announced she was cast a guest spot on Doctor Who as Idris for an episode of the sixth series of Doctor Who. Jones previously played Mona Lisa in The Sarah Jane Adventures episode Mona Lisa's Revenge. Some time after appearing on The Sarah Jane Adventures, Jones was contacted to appear on Doctor Who at Gaiman's request, because they were looking for an actress who "is odd; beautiful but strange-looking, and quite funny." Moffat meanwhile described Idris as "sexy plus motherly plus utterly mad plus serene." During a read-through of the script, the producers asked her to "neutralise [her accent] a bit," because they did not want Jones to "be a northerner" or have a standard accent, but to act "kinda like the Doctor." Later, in March 2011, Gaiman confirmed Michael Sheen would also guest star in the episode to voice a character. Adrian Schiller previously appeared in the Eighth Doctor audio drama Time Works where he played Zanith.

=== Filming ===
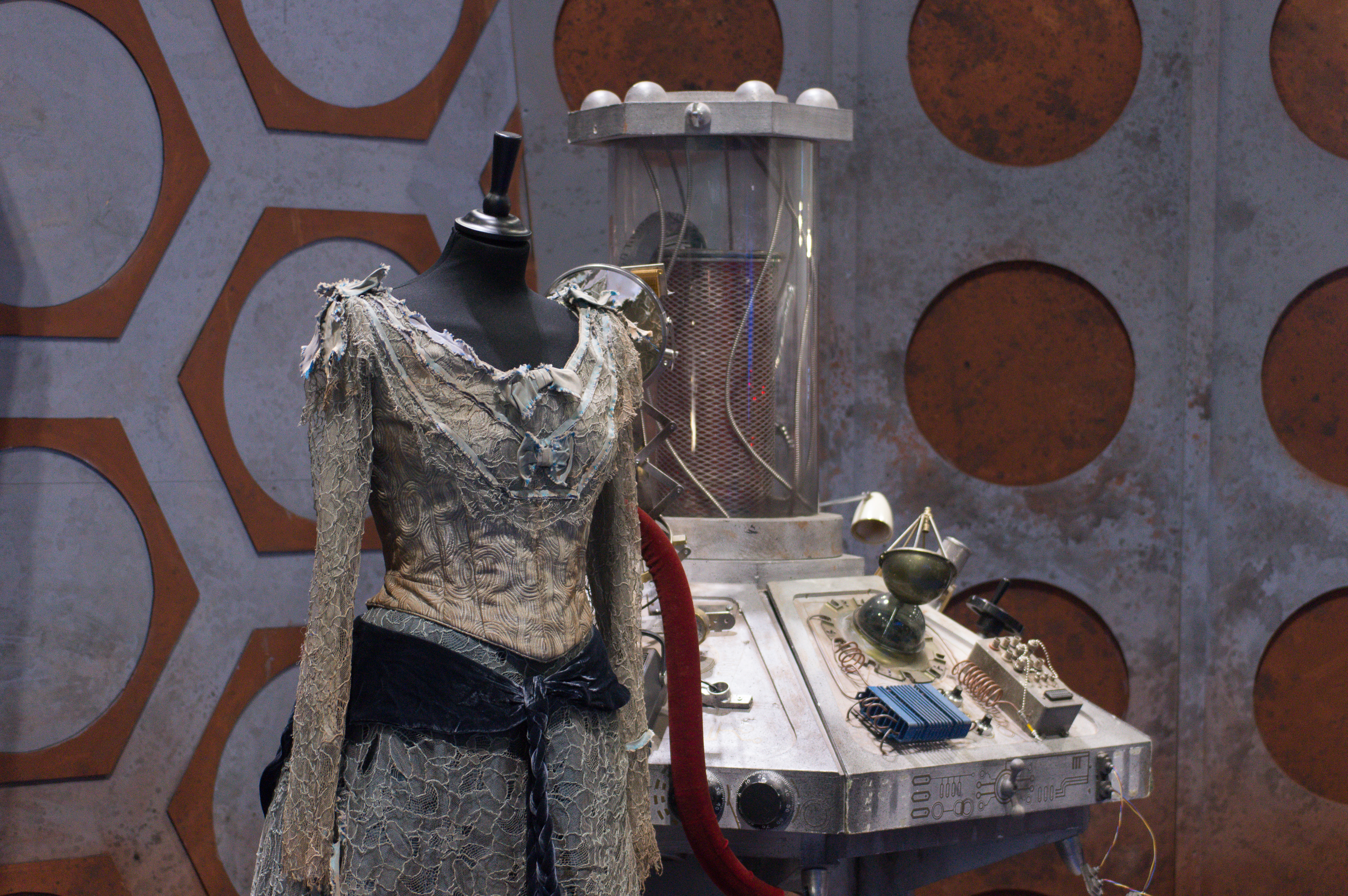
Idris' costume, and the makeshift TARDIS set, on display at the Doctor Who Experience.

"The Doctor's Wife" was planned as the third episode in the 2011 series but the order was changed during the production process. Initial production occurred in September, with Gaiman visiting the set during the production period and filming for the associated Confidential. Additional filming took place in October 2010, with guest star Suranne Jones having been filmed for green screen special effects. The scenes where Amy and Rory are on the run allowed the audience to explore the TARDIS outside the control room, something the producers had wanted to do for a while. A series of corridors was constructed and retained for future use. The episode also featured the return of the older TARDIS control room from the Christopher Eccleston and David Tennant era. Gaiman had originally wanted to reconstruct a console room from the original series, but the cost proved prohibitive. The set was retained after filming for "The Eleventh Hour", but has since been removed to become part of the Doctor Who Experience exhibit. Actor Arthur Darvill noted the floor of the older set had a cheese grater-like quality to it, so when the scene called for the cast to fall on it, they found it uncomfortable to stay down for a long period of time.

"The Doctor's Wife" features a makeshift TARDIS console, which was piloted by the Doctor and Idris. The console was designed by Susannah Leah, a schoolgirl from Todmorden, who won a competition on Blue Peter, a children's programme that challenged its viewers to imagine a TARDIS console based on household objects. Leah's design was selected by Moffat, Edward Thomas, the production designer for the previous series, and Tim Levell, a Blue Peter editor, along with final input among the three age-group winners from Smith. Michael Pickwoad, the production designer for Series 6, commented that Leah's design captured the nature of "bits and pieces" of what TARDIS consoles have been in the past, as well as the nature of the makeshift console needed for this episode. The drawing was redesigned faithfully by the production team into the prop for the show, including the use of a coat hanger to start the makeshift TARDIS. Leah was brought by Blue Peter to see both the set under construction and on location during filming of the makeshift TARDIS scenes, meeting Smith and the other actors and production crew. Character Options released a toy playset based on Leah's console later in 2011. The House planetoid in the pocket universe was filmed on location at a quarry outside Cardiff.

== Broadcast and reception ==
"The Doctor's Wife" was first broadcast in the United Kingdom on BBC One on 14 May 2011 and on sister station BBC America in the United States on the same day. In the UK, the episode received overnight figures of 6.09 million viewers, with a 29.5 per cent audience share. It became the third highest broadcast of the night, behind Britain's Got Talent on ITV1, and the Eurovision Song Contest 2011, which was shown later on BBC One. The episode received a final BARB rating of 7.97 million with an audience share of 34.7%. It had an overall Appreciation Index of 87, considered to be excellent.

=== Critical reception ===
The episode was positively received, with many praising Jones's performance as the TARDIS. The Guardian's Dan Martin said: "With so many wild ideas at play, this would have been so easy to get wrong...yet in every sense it was pitched perfectly". He praised Suranne Jones in particular, saying she was "electrifying throughout". Martin later rated it the third best episode of the series, though the finale was not included in the list. The A.V. Club gave the episode a score of "A", saying it was a "pretty terrific [episode]...a brisk, scary, inventive adventure filled with clever concepts and witty dialogue. And a lot of heart when in the way it deals with an important relationship rarely addressed on the series". He admired the cleverness of the "Idris/TARDIS" characterisation and found the relationship "quite touching". Gavin Fuller of The Telegraph praised the acting of Smith, Jones, and Sheen, and called the episode "hugely enjoyable". Neela Debnath of The Independent praised Gaiman for mixing "romance, tragedy and horror, managing to strike a balance while telling a simple story", though she criticised the frequent deaths of Rory.

SFX magazine reviewer Russell Lewin gave "The Doctor's Wife" four and a half out of five stars, labelling it as "non-stop intrigue and carefully-controlled suspense all the way". He particularly praised Smith's energetic performance, saying "he pings and fizzes around the screen like a Technicolor firework, lighting up every scene he adorns". IGN's Matt Risley rated the episode 9 out of 10 and concluded, "Sweet, touching, intelligent, different, utterly imaginative and accessible by both hardcore fans and newbies alike — this is not only Doctor Who, but sci-fi telly at its finest". He also praised Gaiman's script for being "a simple idea executed brilliantly". Patrick Mulkern of Radio Times admitted he was unsure if he was going to like it with the "grungy setting, wacko characters and peculiar dialogue", but ended up "captivated". He particularly enjoyed seeing more of the TARDIS' interior and called it an "instant oddball classic".

Digital Spy's Morgan Jeffery rated it four out of five stars, saying it "isn't perfect, but you'd be hard-pressed to fault its ambition". He was critical of Jones' performance of Idris, as "her early eccentric behavior tends to grate rather than amuse" though her performance calmed down later in the episode. His other "slight criticism" was that Karen Gillan and Darvill were "sidelined", but praised their performances. Jeffery felt that the strength of the episode was in character rather than in plot, and cited the defeat of the House as a "slightly disappointing" deus ex machina.

In 2013 Charlie Coile published an essay entitled More than a Companion: "The Doctor's Wife" and Representations of Women in "Doctor Who", in which she analyses the portrayal of Idris and the episode's attempt at female empowerment. Coile critiques Idris' characterization, describing Idris as maybe being "the most unsettling example of female representation in the series" and as superficial and critiquing the episode's objectification of her. She also critiques Idris and The Doctor's relationship as unequal, despite their shared experience and the episode's attempt to portray them as equals. In contrast Emily Capettini praised the reinvented dynamic between The TARDIS and The Doctor and The TARDIS' elevated status as an equal to The Doctor in her essay, "A boy and his box, off to see the universe": Madness, Power and Sex in "The Doctor's Wife".

The episode won the 2011 Bradbury Award for Outstanding Dramatic Presentation. It also won the 2012 Hugo Award for Best Dramatic Presentation (Short Form).
