= The Angel of Scutari =

2009 audio drama

Big Finish Productions audio drama
- Series: Doctor Who
- Release no.: 122
- Featuring: Seventh Doctor; Ace; Hex
- Written by: Paul Sutton
- Directed by: Ken Bentley
- Production code: 7W/L
- Release date: June 2009

The Angel of Scutari is a Big Finish Productions audio drama based on the long-running British science fiction television series Doctor Who.

== Plot ==
In the Crimea, 1854, Hex meets his hero, Florence Nightingale.

== Cast ==
- Seventh Doctor – Sylvester McCoy
- Ace – Sophie Aldred
- Hex – Philip Olivier
- Sir Sidney Herbert / Tzar Nicholas I – Hugh Bonneville
- Florence Nightingale – Jeany Spark
- William Russell / Russian DungeonGuard – John Paul Connolly
- Brigadier-General Bartholomew ‘Barty’ Kitchen – Alex Lowe
- Sir Hamilton Seymour – Sean Brosnan
- Lev Tolstoy / Preston – John Albasiny

== The Three Companions ==
The Three Companions bonus feature, Part 3.

The Gathernaut by Marc Platt

=== Cast ===
- Polly – Anneke Wills
- Thomas Brewster – John Pickard
- Gerry Lenz/Announcer – Russell Floyd

== Continuity ==
- During this story, the exterior of the TARDIS is rendered white when a cannonball shatters its corporeal shell. It remains white for the next several stories, finally returning to blue in Black and White.
- The spare TARDIS key hidden behind the "Police Box" P was first revealed in the 1996 TV movie.

== Cast notes ==
Hugh Bonneville would later play Captain Avery in the Eleventh Doctor episode "The Curse of the Black Spot".

== Notes ==
In the Whovian timeline, this story takes place between Enemy of the Daleks and Project: Destiny

== Critical reception ==
Doctor Who Magazine reviewer Matt Michael criticised the underuse of both Tolstoy and Nightingale, but found that "its charms outweigh its flaws".
