= Sarah Smart =

English actress (born 1977)

Sarah Smart (born 3 March 1977) is an English actress.

== Early life ==
Smart was born on 3 March 1977 in Birmingham, England and lived in Northfield until 1987. She was a pupil of St Paul's School for Girls in Birmingham.

== Career ==
Her career started as a child in the television series Woof! She also played Virginia Braithwaite, daughter of a lottery winning family, in the comedy drama At Home with the Braithwaites. She appeared in two television productions written by Sally Wainwright, Sparkhouse (Red Production Company/BBC, 2002) and Jane Hall (Red Production Company/ITV1, 2006). Between 2008 and 2012, she played Ann-Britt Höglund in Wallander, nine feature-length adaptations of Henning Mankell's Wallander novels, for the BBC. Smart has also been featured in several radio dramas. In 2011, she appeared in a two-part story for the sixth series of the BBC series Doctor Who as the sympathetic "villain" of The Rebel Flesh/The Almost People.

== Selected filmography ==
- Father Brown (TV series) – "The Royal Visit" (2023)
- The Chelsea Detective – "The Gentle Giant" (2022)
- Silent Witness – "Remembrance" (2017)
- The Musketeers (2016, TV Series)
- New Tricks – "Body of Evidence" (2012, TV series)
- The Secret of Crickley Hall (2012)
- Death in Paradise (2011, TV series)
- Fast Freddie, The Widow and Me (2011, Christmas Special)
- The Man Who Crossed Hitler (2011, TV Movie)
- Doctor Who – "The Rebel Flesh" and "The Almost People" (2011, TV series)
- Midsomer Murders – "Echoes of the Dead" (2011)
- Monroe (2011, TV Drama)
- Agatha Christie's Marple (2010, TV series) "They Do It With Mirrors" – Mildred
- Casualty 1909 (2009, TV series)
- Agatha Christie's Poirot – "Mrs McGinty's Dead" – Maude Williams (2008)
- Wallander (2008, TV series)
- Casualty 1907 (2008, TV series)
- Ghosts (2007, Theatre)
- Five Days (2007, TV series)
- Jane Hall (2006, TV series)
- Casualty 1906 (2006, TV series)
- Funland (2005, TV series)
- Sparkhouse (2002, TV series)
- Dalziel and Pascoe – "Walls of Silence" (2001)
- David Copperfield (2000, television movie)
- At Home with the Braithwaites (2000, TV series)
- Wuthering Heights (1998, TV film)
- Soldier Soldier (1997, TV series)
- A Touch of Frost – "Penny for the Guy" (1997)
