= Matthew Graham =

British television writer

- Occupations: Screenwriter and television producer.
- Children: 2
- Writing career
- Period: 1990–present
- Genres: Drama, adventure, science fiction

Matthew Graham is a British television writer, and the co-creator of the BBC/Kudos Film and Television science fiction series Life on Mars, which debuted in 2006 on BBC One and has received international critical acclaim.

== Career ==
Graham began his career writing for the Children's ITV bicycle courier teen drama Streetwise in 1990, co-penning every episode of its second and third series. Following this, he moved to the BBC to write for fellow children's dramas Byker Grove and The Biz, as well as EastEnders. Graham then wrote for the popular BBC Two drama series This Life, and created and wrote the post-apocalyptic drama serial The Last Train for ITV. He also wrote episodes for Spooks and Hustle, and "Fear Her", an episode of the 2006 series of Doctor Who.

Ashes to Ashes, a Life on Mars sequel which he co-created with Life on Mars writer/co-creator Ashley Pharoah, was first broadcast on BBC One on 8 January 2008, to an audience of 7 million, according to overnight figures. In the US, ABC commissioned a remake of Life on Mars, also to be called Life on Mars, developed by David E. Kelley, creator of Ally McBeal, for broadcast in the 2007/08 midseason.

In 2006, Graham formed Monastic Productions with Pharoah (co-creator of Life on Mars). Monastic Productions are involved in the Life on Mars spin-off Ashes to Ashes, as well as in co-producing Bonekickers, a 6-part drama series about archaeology set in Bath. Both series are productions for BBC One. Bonekickers was not renewed after the first series, but Ashes to Ashes completed its third and final series in May 2010.

In November 2010, Graham announced the production of a new television series co-created with Pharoah for ITV. Eternal Law tells the story of two angels who are sent to Earth to assist in the salvation of mankind as lawyers in a York law firm. He also confirmed that he would be returning to the world of Doctor Who in 2011, writing the fifth and sixth episodes of the sixth series, a two-part story entitled "The Rebel Flesh" and "The Almost People".

His adaptation of the novel Childhood's End aired on Syfy in December 2015.

He wrote “The Hood Maker”, the first episode in the Channel 4/Amazon Video series Philip K. Dick's Electric Dreams, which first aired in September 2017.

== Writing credits ==
Production	Notes	Broadcaster
Streetwise	14 episodes (1990-1992)	ITV
EastEnders	12 episodes (1992–1995)	BBC One
Byker Grove	6 episodes (1992)	BBC One
The Biz	2 episodes (1995)	BBC One
This Life	4 episodes (1996–1997): "Cheap Thrills" (1996); "Just Sex" (1996); "The Bi Who Came in from the Cold" (1997); "How to Get in Bed by Advertising" (1997)	BBC Two
Thief Takers	"One Last Hurrah" (1997)	ITV
City Central	"Justice to Be Done" (1998); "Throwing It All Away" (1998)	BBC One
The Last Train	6 episodes (1999)	ITV
Reach for the Moon	Television miniseries (2000)	ITV
EastEnders	9 episodes (2000–2002)	BBC One
EastEnders: Return of Nick Cotton	Television film (2000)	BBC One
The Gentleman Thief	Television film (2001)	BBC One
Impact	Television film (2002)	N/A
Spooks	"Spiders" (uncredited, 2003)	BBC One
POW	6 episodes (co-written with Matt Jones, 2003)	ITV
Hustle	"Picture Perfect" (2004); "Confessions" (2005)	BBC One
Walk Away and I Stumble	Television film (2005)	ITV
Doctor Who	"Fear Her" (2006); "The Rebel Flesh" (2011); "The Almost People" (2011)	BBC One
Life on Mars	16 episodes (2006–2007)	BBC One
Bonekickers	6 episodes (2008)	BBC One
Ashes to Ashes	24 episodes (2008–2010)	BBC One
Eternal Law	6 episodes (co-written with Ashley Pharoah, 2012)	ITV
R'ha	Short film (2013)	N/A
Childhood's End	Television miniseries (2015)	Syfy
Kat & Alfie: Redwater	1 episode (2017)	BBC One
Philip K. Dick's Electric Dreams	"The Hood Maker" (2017)	Channel 4/Amazon Video
The Spanish Princess	12 episodes (2019–2020)	Starz

== Awards and nominations ==
Year	Award	Work	Category	Result	Reference
1997	Writers' Guild of Great Britain Award	This Life	TV – Original Drama Serial (with Richard Zajdlic, Mark Davies Markham, Joe Ahearne, Ian Iqbal Rashid, Amelia Bullmore, Eirene Houston, Annie Caulfield, Jimmy Gardner and William Gaminara)	Won	
2006	TV Quick Awards	Life on Mars	Best New Drama (with Tony Jordan and Ashley Pharoah)	Nominated	
2007	British Academy Television Awards	Life on Mars	Best Writer	Nominated	
2007	Broadcasting Press Guild Awards	Life on Mars	Writer's Award (with Tony Jordan and Ashley Pharoah)	Won	
2007	TV Quick Awards	Life on Mars	Best Loved Drama (with Tony Jordan and Ashley Pharoah)	Nominated	
2007	Edgar Allan Poe Awards	Life on Mars: "Episode 1"	Best Television Episode Teleplay	Won	
2007	Writers' Guild of Great Britain Award	Life on Mars: Series 2	Soap/Series (TV) (with Chris Chibnall, Mark Greig, Ashley Pharoah, Guy Jenkin, Tony Jordan and Julie Rutterford)	Nominated	
2008	Banff Rockie Award	Life on Mars: "Episode 8"	Best Continuing Series (with S. J. Clarkson)	Nominated	
2008	Cinéma Tous Ecrans	Ashes to Ashes	Audience Award for Best International Television Series (with Ashley Pharoah)	Won	
2008	Writers' Guild of Great Britain Award	Ashes to Ashes	Television Drama Series (with Ashley Pharoah, Mark Greig, Julie Rutterford and Mick Ford)	Nominated	
2010	TRIC Awards	Ashes to Ashes	TV Crime Programme (with Tony Jordan and Ashley Pharoah)	Nominated	
2010	TV Quick Awards	Ashes to Ashes	Best Drama Series (with Ashley Pharoah)	Won	
2010	Writers' Guild of Great Britain Award	Ashes to Ashes	Television Drama Series (with Ashley Pharoah, Julie Rutterford, Tom Butterworth, Chris Hurford, Jack Lothian and James Payne)	Nominated	
2011	TRIC Awards	Ashes to Ashes	TV Drama Programme of the Year (with Ashley Pharoah)	Nominated	
2011	SFX Awards	Ashes to Ashes: "Finale"	Best TV Episode (with David Drury)	Won	
2011	Writers' Guild of Great Britain Award	Doctor Who	Best Television Drama Series (with Steven Moffat, Richard Curtis, Stephen Thompson, Gareth Roberts and Neil Gaiman)	Nominated	
