= The Almost People =

Episode of Doctor Who

217b – "The Almost People"
- Doctor Who episode
- Jennifer's Ganger transforms into a monster, which was CGI created in post-production.

Cast
- Doctor: Matt Smith – Eleventh Doctor
- Companions: Karen Gillan – Amy Pond; Arthur Darvill – Rory Williams
- Others: Mark Bonnar – Jimmy; Marshall Lancaster – Buzzer; Sarah Smart – Jennifer Lucas; Raquel Cassidy – Miranda Cleaves; Leon Vickers – Dicken; Frances Barber – Eye Patch Lady; Edmond Moulton – Adam

Production
- Directed by: Julian Simpson
- Written by: Matthew Graham
- Produced by: Marcus Wilson
- Executive producers: Steven Moffat; Piers Wenger; Beth Willis
- Music by: Murray Gold
- Production code: 2.6
- Series: Series 6
- Running time: 2nd of 2-part story, 45 minutes
- First broadcast: 28 May 2011

Chronology
← Preceded by "The Rebel Flesh"	Followed by → "A Good Man Goes to War"

"The Almost People" is the sixth episode of the sixth series of the British science fiction television series Doctor Who, and was first broadcast on BBC One on 28 May 2011. It is the second episode of a two-part story written by Matthew Graham and directed by Julian Simpson which began with "The Rebel Flesh".

Following from "The Rebel Flesh", alien time traveller the Doctor (Matt Smith) and his companions Amy Pond (Karen Gillan) and Rory Williams (Arthur Darvill) are on an acid-pumping factory on a remote island in the 22nd century where the crew of the factory create "Gangers", the Flesh duplicates they control. However, a solar storm has caused the Gangers to become sentient, and the Doctor must prevent a war breaking out between the humans and Gangers.

"The Almost People" ends on a cliffhanger which brings several plot threads of the series to a head. The two-part story was filmed from November 2010 to January 2011, mainly at Caerphilly Castle. The Gangers were achieved with the aid of prosthetics, as well as computer-generated imagery for their contortions. "The Almost People" also features a Flesh double of the Doctor, which marked Smith's first time in prosthetic make-up. The episode was watched by 6.72 million viewers in the UK and received mixed reviews from critics, many noting that the cliffhanger overshadowed the actual story of the episode.

== Plot ==
=== Synopsis ===
The "Gangers", duplicates of several workers at an island acid factory, have turned against their human counterparts, forcing the humans to take shelter in a secured commons area. There, they discover that a Ganger of the Eleventh Doctor exists. Rory has gone off alone to find the emotionally distraught Jennifer. The Ganger Jennifer kills the real Jennifer, and then stages a fight with another Ganger Jennifer to convince Rory that she is the human version. Ganger Jennifer leads Rory to a console, claiming it will restore power when instead it disables the cooling system for the acid, making it dangerously unstable. She then convinces Rory to lead the human group into the acid storage chamber and traps them inside; crewman Jimmy is killed trying to stall the acid release. After investigating the real Jennifer's corpse, another crewman, Buzzer, knocks out the Ganger Doctor, but he gets killed and eaten by Ganger Jennifer afterwards.

Using a video call for Jimmy's son Adam, the Ganger Doctor convinces the Ganger Jimmy and the other Gangers they are just as real as their human counterparts, with Cleaves bonding with her Ganger over a blood clot she has in her brain, which her Ganger also shares. Ganger Jennifer becomes furious at this display and rages off; the other Gangers agree to work with the humans to escape the facility. They free the humans trapped in the acid storage room, and race off through the crypts below the monastery, chased by a savage Ganger Jennifer who has transformed herself into a monster. Ganger Cleaves and the Ganger Doctor hold the door to allow the Doctor, Amy, Rory, human Cleaves, Ganger Jimmy and Ganger Dicken to escape to the TARDIS. The Cleaves and Doctor Gangers together face the monster, triggering a sonic screwdriver at the right moment to cause them and the monster to dissolve back into liquid.

Aboard the TARDIS, the Doctor indefinitely stabilises the Gangers' forms to ensure that they remain human permanently and offers Cleaves a cure for her blood clot. Ganger Jimmy goes to meet Adam, and Cleaves and Dicken go to their headquarters where they plan to reveal the truth of the Flesh to humanity. As the TARDIS crew turns to leave, Amy starts feeling contractions. Back aboard the TARDIS, the Doctor admits his trip to the factory was planned: he wanted to investigate the Flesh in its raw form, as he has known for some time that Amy is a Ganger herself. He promises her that he will find her and then disrupts her form, turning her back to raw Flesh. Amy wakes up pregnant in a pristine white tube, observed by the "Eye Patch Lady", and starts entering labour.

=== Continuity ===
While struggling with his past regenerations, the Doctor's Ganger alludes to several previous Doctors' words. He misquotes the First Doctor's line "one day I shall come back...yes, one day" from The Dalek Invasion of Earth as "one day we will get back"; quotes the Third Doctor's catchphrase "reverse the polarity of the neutron flow"; and speaks with the voices of the Fourth and Tenth Doctors (Tom Baker and David Tennant, respectively), the former expressing that Doctor's fondness for jelly babies. Growing frustrated by the humans' distrust of him, the Doctor asks both Amy and Cleaves' Gangers to refer to him as "John Smith". This is an alias the Doctor has used on several occasions, beginning with The Wheel in Space (1968).

== Production ==
=== Writing ===
Matthew Graham was originally scheduled to write a single episode for the previous series, but withdrew because he did not have enough time to finish the script. Showrunner Steven Moffat e-mailed him asking for him to write for the next series, and Graham agreed. When the two met, Moffat said he would like the episodes to lead into the mid-series finale and that it should deal with "avatars that rebel". After Graham had finished his script Moffat had the idea of what would need to happen at the end of "The Almost People" to lead into the next episode and gave Graham the premise for the cliffhanger, which Graham "loved". With "The Almost People", Graham avoided creating similar situations that had happened in "The Rebel Flesh". He originally intended on setting "The Almost People" in a different location to "throw everybody", but decided that would be unnecessary.

Graham found writing for two Doctors easy, as Matt Smith's Doctor had a constant "internal dialogue" and was always finishing his own sentences. He wanted each character to be different and did not want all of them to become evil, and the Doctor would help them discover their humanity. Graham wanted Jennifer to be the antagonist as he liked the idea of the quietest character becoming the most evil. The original script explained that she has a perfect memory, and so her Ganger was able to remember every terrible thing that had happened to the Flesh. Several other sequences were cut from the final version of "The Almost People". In the original script, the Doctor quizzes the Flesh Doctor about the events of The Mind of Evil (1971) and mentions former companions Jo Grant, Sarah Jane Smith, Romana, Rose Tyler, Martha Jones, and Donna Noble. There was also a montage of happy memories of the Doctor's life stored in the Flesh Doctor, which included flashbacks of previous episodes and serials of the show as well as events that had not transpired onscreen. Also cut was the TARDIS providing the Doctor with another sonic screwdriver after he had given it to the Flesh Doctor, in a similar fashion to "The Eleventh Hour".

The cliffhanger resolves several plot threads that had been seeded throughout the previous episodes of the series. According to executive producer Beth Willis, the Amy Pond Ganger has been acting in place of the original Amy Pond since the beginning of the series. Amy claimed she was pregnant in "The Impossible Astronaut", but denied this in the following episode. Since then, the Doctor has performed several inconclusive pregnancy tests on Amy. The Eye Patch Lady, who was later revealed to be named Madame Kovarian in the episode "A Good Man Goes To War", previously made brief appearances in "Day of the Moon", "The Curse of the Black Spot", and "The Rebel Flesh". Gillan discussed the labour scene with her mother, and tried to make it "really horrific".

=== Filming and effects ===
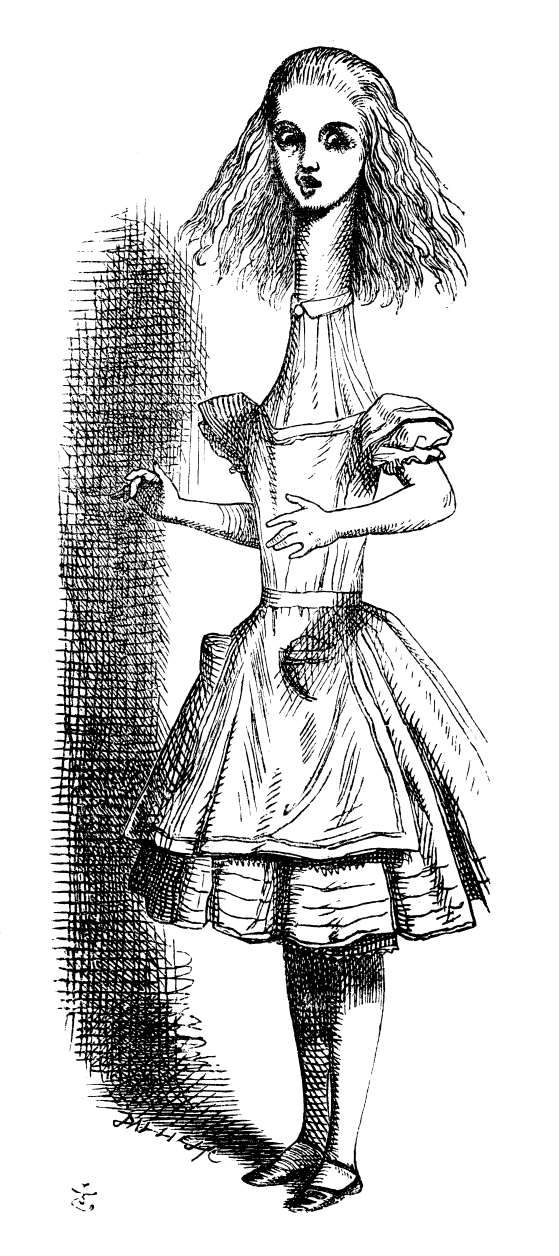
Jennifer's monster was inspired by this drawing from Alice's Adventures in Wonderland.

The read-through for "The Rebel Flesh" and "The Almost People" took place on 12 November 2010. It was then filmed through November and January 2011. The cold temperatures at the time were a challenge and caused discomfort. The crew were concerned that the cast, particularly the three lead actors, would fall ill as their costumes were not designed for such weather conditions. Even so, the cast remained healthy. Scenes outside and inside the monastery were filmed at Caerphilly Castle. Other production problems included the director hurting himself and being snowed in. The crypt where the acid container was held was filmed in the same set that had been previously used as the Oval Office in "The Impossible Astronaut"/"Day of the Moon. The actors each played their respective Gangers, with prosthetics applied to their faces for when the duplicates' faces reverted to the original material of the Flesh. For the scenes in which both the character and their respective Ganger was in the same shot, a double for each of the actors was used. Most of the shots showed either the character or their Ganger speaking over their counterpart's shoulder, as only the backs of the doubles' head were made to look similar to the actors. Smith had a voice double and a body double; the former would read the other Doctor's lines on set. The episode also marked the first time Smith wore prosthetic make-up.

The unique contortions of the Gangers were achieved through computer-generated imagery done by The Mill. It was originally planned that Jennifer would eat Buzzer, but The Mill decided only the shadows of the action would be shown on the wall. All of this was cut from the final episode, with the exception of Jennifer's elongated mouth as she advanced towards him. The pile of discarded Jennifer Gangers was originally intended to just be a pile of bodies, but it was decided that would be "too grim". Instead, life-sized dolls were used and computer-generated Flesh was painted on it, giving it a more melted look. The monster Jennifer transforms into at the end was created with CGI and a photo of pop singer Madonna was used as reference, as in the image "here arms were...really sinewy, white, veiny, and fleshy". Graham wanted the creature to have a real face and an alien body; he was inspired by a drawing in Alice's Adventures in Wonderland that depicted Alice with a long neck. Sarah Smart was filmed in front of a greenscreen maneuvering like the monster, which was used as reference.

== Broadcast and reception ==
"The Almost People" was first broadcast in the United Kingdom on BBC One on 28 May 2011. In the United States, BBC America delayed broadcast of this episode until 4 June, one week later than it was aired in the UK, due to expected low numbers of TV viewers during the Memorial Day weekend. In the UK, overnight figures showed that "The Almost People" was watched by five million viewers on first broadcast. Final consolidated figures rose to 6.72 million, the sixth highest viewing figure of a programme on BBC One for that week. It is the lowest figure for Doctor Who's sixth series. The episode received an Appreciation Index of 86, considered "excellent".

=== Critical reception ===
Dan Martin of The Guardian thought that it "feels a bit uneven, though it's worth saying that it's one of those where everything makes more sense on second viewing". He also felt that the cliffhanger may have overshadowed the episode itself. However, he went on to describe the Gangers as "memorable" and "an exercise in moral dilemmas". He later rated it the ninth best episode of the series, though the finale was not included in the list. Gavin Fuller of The Daily Telegraph described it as a "taut, claustrophobic, sci-fi thriller", and as an "impressive episode with its neatly realised psychological and body horror". Both Martin and Fuller were less generous of Jennifer's monster transformation. Martin commented "this dark, thoughtful story is restored to camp running-for-your-life-around-some-corridors", and Fuller called it "something of a pity".

Neela Debnath of The Independent particularly praised Smith, stating that he "excels in his acting, managing to be reassuring and threatening, hilarious and sinister all within the same few scenes". However, though she praised the cliffhanger, she thought it "eclipsed" the episode. Radio Times writer Patrick Mulkern thought that there were "points of logic" which might be questioned, but they were "minor points to wrestle with in a largely polished production". Keith Phipps, reviewing for The A.V. Club, gave the episode a B and called it a "pretty good follow-up".

IGN's Matt Risely rated "The Almost People" 8 out of 10, noting that "As a traditional two-parter, Matthew Graham wrote a tight and coherent but not entirely scintillating script that managed to 'flesh' out the themes of morality and humanity with a couple of interesting touches". Though he called the cliffhanger a "perfectly pitched WTF moment", he too believed that it "detracts from the episode as a whole". Richard Edwards of SFX was more critical of the episode, giving it three out of five stars. He stated he did not feel any "genuine threat" and considered the Gangers to be "uninteresting" and "predictable". However, he did praise Smith's performance and the cliffhanger. Digital Spy listed the cliffhanger among five best of Doctor Who since its revival in 2005, explaining, "it changes everything you thought you knew about the latest series, and it's damn creepy".
