= The Time of the Angels =

Novel by Iris Murdoch

- First edition cover
- Author: Iris Murdoch
- Cover artist: John Craxton
- Language: English
- Genre: Philosophical fiction
- Publisher: Chatto & Windus
- Publication date: 1966
- Publication place: United Kingdom
- Media type: Print (Hardcover)
- Pages: 252
- OCLC: 12071239

The Time of the Angels is a philosophical novel by British novelist Iris Murdoch. First published in 1966, it was her tenth novel. The novel centres on Carel Fisher, an eccentric Anglican priest who is the rector of a London church which was destroyed by bombing during World War II. Fisher denies the existence of God and the possibility of human goodness in a post-theistic world. The novel, which has elements of Gothic fiction, received mixed reviews on its publication.

== Plot ==
The action takes place over the course of several winter days in London. The plot centres on Carel Fisher, an eccentric Anglican priest who has lost his faith. At the beginning of the novel, he has just been put in charge of a church that was heavily damaged by bombing in the Second World War, so that only the tower and the rectory remain standing. His twenty-four-year-old daughter, Muriel, and nineteen-year old niece Elizabeth, a semi-invalid recluse, live with him. The household also includes Pattie O'Driscoll, Carel Fisher's half-Jamaican housekeeper and former mistress, Eugene Peshkov, a Russian émigré who works as the rectory's janitor, and Eugene's son Leo, a student at a technical college. Carel Fisher performs no church functions and refuses to admit anyone to the rectory or to communicate with anyone, including his brother, Marcus, who is nominally the co-guardian of their niece Elizabeth. Marcus is the headmaster of a school, on leave in order to write a book on "morality in a secular age". Marcus twice gains entrance to the house by stealth, and on each occasion he has a harrowing conversation with his brother, who insists that there is no God, and that in any case "goodness is impossible for us".

Leo Peshkov was formerly a student at Marcus's school, where his fees were paid by Marcus and his friend Norah Shadox-Brown, a retired headmistress. Leo is a charming but untrustworthy boy who repeatedly lies to his acquaintances, including Marcus, in order to extract money from them. Later he steals a treasured icon from his father and sells it. Muriel befriends Leo and forms a plan of introducing him to Elizabeth. However this plan is aborted when, on the way to Elizabeth's room, Muriel and Leo hide in an adjacent room to escape detection by Pattie, and Muriel, looking through a crack in the wall, sees her father in bed with Elizabeth. Later, Carel tells Muriel to move out of the rectory, where he intends to remain with Elizabeth.

During the course of the novel Pattie and Muriel both fall in love with Eugene. Eugene asks Pattie to marry him, but she is reluctant to accept him because of her relationship with Carel, to whom she still feels bound. Eventually she agrees, but the jealous Muriel tells Eugene about the affair between Pattie and her father. Later, confronted by Pattie, Muriel tells her that Carel is having an affair with Elizabeth, whereupon Pattie reveals that Elizabeth is actually Carel's daughter rather than his niece.

Just as Muriel is about to leave the rectory to stay with Norah Shadox-Brown, she goes to her father's room and finds that he has taken an overdose of pills and is dying. He has received a letter from Pattie, disclosing that both Pattie and Muriel know the truth about Carel's incestuous relationship with Elizabeth. Muriel takes no action to forestall his suicide attempt and he dies. After his death Muriel and Elizabeth set up house together elsewhere in London, while Pattie goes to Africa to work in a refugee camp, and the rectory and church tower are demolished to make way for new development.

== Major themes ==
The central theme of the novel is the question of how, and whether, morality is possible in a post-religious age. This is also the subject of the book that the character Marcus Fisher is writing. During the time when Murdoch was writing the novel, she was engaged as a philosopher with this and related issues, and published her own book on the subject, The Sovereignty of Good, in 1970.

Other important themes are "the abuse of power and sexual domination", both embodied in Carel Fisher, who has been described as one of Murdoch's "most convincingly evil character(s)". Carel is presented as a demonic Faust-like character who has "rejected redemption" by denying the existence of both God and Good. Murdoch biographer and literary critic Peter J. Conradi notes that incest and theft, which are committed by Carel and Leo Peshkov respectively in The Time of the Angels, are used by Murdoch as "paradigm forms of law-breaking" in several of her novels.

== Literary significance and reception ==
After the initial publication of the novel, reception was mixed. The New York Times reviewer Walter Allen, though critical of Murdoch's novels becoming "predictable", was generally positive, writing that "mystery is genuinely embodied; the reader's imagination is addressed, responds and is satisfied." Also in the New York Times, Charles Poore, while noting Murdoch's "preachy passages" and the book's "gothick novel" aspects, described her as a "born storyteller" and The Time of the Angels as the "newest and best" of her "excellent melodramas". In The New York Review of Books Denis Donoghue described the novel as "elegiac", "an anthology of defeats: magic, belief, prayer, love, and now perhaps poetry itself." Kirkus Reviews described the novel as a "mediocre work" partially because of her frequent novel writing, writing that the plot resembles her own earlier work and that Murdoch's "prose has become flabby". Writing in Commentary, Robert Garis noted that Murdoch had published ten novels in twelve years and similarly attributed the novel's shortcomings to her speedy production of novels.

A 2011 review by the website complete review concluded that the novel was a B+, writing that it was a "Bizarre, fascinating, certainly very readable -- and with some interesting philosophical issues cleverly considered -- The Time of the Angels is nevertheless a somewhat unsatisfying work."

Critics have treated The Time of the Angels primarily as a philosophical novel. A.S. Byatt has characterized it as a "mythical" novel in which the thematic patterns and underlying structure have "more aesthetic power than the individual characters". She argues that it is "best read as a mannered philosophical myth, or fantasy" and that Murdoch's inclusion of passages of "emotional immediacy" such as her initial description of Pattie O'Driscoll's origins and early life tends to create "jarring effects or difficulties" for readers. Others have described it as a "gothic" novel, in which a sinister priest presides over a ruined church in an atmosphere of cold fog and darkness. Conradi calls it "a Gothic and a religious novel", and thus similar to Murdoch's 1963 novel The Unicorn.

Jill Paton Walsh characterizes the philosophical discussions in The Time of the Angels, and particularly Marcus's book on ethics, as examples of "placed philosophy". Such passages tell the novel's readers "what the author thinks the discourse in the novel is about". According to Paton Walsh, inserting philosophical content into novels is "dangerous" because it can hinder the narrative flow. "Placed philosophy either sticks out a lot, and risks the reader feeling got at; or it is dissolved into the substance of fiction, and gets itself thought of fictionally".

Philosophical readings of the novel have included an analysis of Murdoch's relation to and understanding of Heidegger and a Foucauldian reading centred on the themes of incest and patriarchal power. It has also been interpreted as an allegory about the "reconciliation of love and death".
