= Sparkhouse =

- Created by: Sally Wainwright
- Starring: Alun Armstrong; Sarah Smart; Joseph McFadden; Richard Armitage
- Composer: Tot Taylor
- Country of origin: United Kingdom
- Original language: English
- No. of series: 1
- No. of episodes: 3

Production
- Running time: 180 min
- Production companies: Red Production Company; Studio of the North; Yorkshire Media Production Agency (YMPA)

Original release
- Network: BBC One
- Release: 1 September – 8 September 2002

Sparkhouse is a BBC drama, originally shown on BBC One from 1 to 8 September 2002. Written by Sally Wainwright, it is a modern take on Emily Brontë's 1847 novel Wuthering Heights.

== Synopsis ==
Two young lovers battle against the odds to be together. The role of Heathcliff is played by a woman (Sarah Smart).

== Cast ==
- Carol Bolton – Sarah Smart
- Richard Bolton – Alun Armstrong
- Lisa Bolton (older) – Holly Grainger
  - Lisa Bolton (young) – April James
- Andrew Lawton – Joseph McFadden
- John Standring – Richard Armitage
- Kate Lawton – Celia Imrie
- Paul Lawton – Nicholas Farrell
- Andrew Lawton as Child - Benjamin Kandel
