= Rory Williams =

Fictional character from Doctor Who

- Doctor Who character
- Arthur Darvill as Rory Williams
- First appearance: "The Eleventh Hour" (2010)
- Last appearance: "The Angels Take Manhattan" (2012)
- Created by: Steven Moffat
- Portrayed by: Arthur Darvill; Ezekiel Wigglesworth (young)
- Duration: 2010–2012

In-universe information
- Full name: Rory Arthur Williams
- Nicknames: Rory the Roman, "The Nose"
- Gender: Male
- Title: The Last Centurion (The Lone Centurion)
- Occupation: Nurse
- Affiliation: Eleventh Doctor
- Family: Brian Williams (father)
- Spouse: Amy Pond
- Children: Melody Pond/River Song (daughter); Anthony Williams (adoptive son)
- Relatives: The Doctor (child-in-law)
- Origin: Gloucestershire, England
- Home era: Early 21st century

Rory Arthur Williams is a fictional character portrayed by Arthur Darvill in the BBC science fiction television series Doctor Who. Introduced in series 5, Rory joins the Eleventh Doctor (Matt Smith) as a companion a few episodes later intermittently, consolidating his place as a full companion in Series 6. As fellow companion Amy Pond's (Karen Gillan) fiancé, Rory is initially insecure because he believes Amy secretly loves the Doctor more. Later, however, he proves to be a hero in his own right and he and Amy get married. The couple conceive a daughter aboard the Doctor's time machine, the TARDIS, while in the time vortex, but their baby is kidnapped at birth. In "A Good Man Goes to War", Rory and Amy discover their time traveller friend River Song (Alex Kingston) is actually their daughter, Melody Pond. The Doctor and River marry in "The Wedding of River Song", and Rory becomes the Doctor's father-in-law. In "The Angels Take Manhattan", the fifth episode of the seventh series, he and Amy are transported back in time by a Weeping Angel, leading to the couple's departure from the series.

== Appearances ==
=== Television ===
Rory is introduced in "The Eleventh Hour" (2010) as a nurse in a coma ward and the "sort of boyfriend" of new companion Amelia Pond (Karen Gillan). He is shocked to meet Amy's 'imaginary' "Raggedy Doctor" - the Eleventh Doctor (Matt Smith), whom he instantly recognises from Amy's childhood stories. Two years later, Amy absconds on the eve of their wedding to travel with the Doctor, whom, at the end of an initial travelling period, she tries to seduce. In response, the Doctor takes Amy and Rory to 1580s Venice to repair and strengthen the couple's relationship; at the end of the episode Rory joins them as a travelling companion. In "Amy's Choice", in a shared realistic dream where he is a doctor married to a pregnant Amy, he tells her with his dying breath to look after their baby, which causes Amy to realise how much she loves him. Rory travels with the Doctor and Amy until mid-series when, in "Cold Blood", he is shot dead by a Silurian after saving the Doctor and then absorbed by a crack in time and space, erasing him from existence and from Amy's memory.

He next appears in "The Pandorica Opens", as a Roman soldier in 102 C.E., but is revealed to be an Auton with Rory's memories. Rory attempts to fight his Auton programming, but unwillingly shoots Amy. In the Series 5 finale episode, "The Big Bang", the duplicate Rory preserves Amy in stasis using a futuristic prison called the Pandorica, voluntarily watching over her for almost two millennia. He becomes known as "The Last Centurion", guarding the Pandorica wherever it is taken. The Auton Rory assists the Doctor, Amy, and River Song (Alex Kingston) in saving the universe from the explosion that caused the cracks in time. Restored to his original human timeline but still possessing memories of his Auton existence, Rory marries Amy. The couple continue traveling with the Doctor, who allows them a honeymoon. They are said to still be on their honeymoon in both The Sarah Jane Adventures serial Death of the Doctor and the Christmas special "A Christmas Carol".

Series 6 premiere "The Impossible Astronaut" (2011) begins with Amy and Rory living back on Earth when they are contacted by the Doctor, via a letter, to meet him in America. In Utah they witness the Doctor dying in his relative future at the hands of a mysterious assassin. In "The Almost People," it's revealed Amy has been kidnapped and replaced with a Ganger – a duplicate animated by the real Amy's consciousness – which the Doctor disintegrates upon deducing the situation, just as the real Amy goes into labour on a secret asteroid base called "Demon's Run". Amy gives birth to their daughter, Melody Pond, between "The Almost People" and "A Good Man Goes To War"; Madame Kovarian (Frances Barber) and the Silence plan to raise her as a weapon against the Doctor because she has been born with Time Lord-like abilities. Rory, dressed in his centurion armor, faces down a space fleet of Cybermen to learn Amy's location, and assists the Doctor in assembling an army to rescue her. Though Amy and Rory are distressed they were unable to save Melody from being kidnapped by Madam Kovarian, River appears at the episode's climax and reveals to Amy and Rory that she is their daughter, Melody. "Let's Kill Hitler" begins by revealing that Melody went on to become Amy and Rory's childhood friend, Mels, so that she might one day meet and kill the Doctor. As Amy had initially assumed Rory was gay due to his lack of interest in other women, a teenage Mels (Nina Toussaint-White) had been the one to inform Amy of Rory's affections. On 21st century Earth, Mels hijacks the TARDIS and directs it to 1938, where she is shot by Hitler (Albert Welling) and regenerates into River Song. They learn she is the assailant they saw kill the Doctor in his future. At the episode's conclusion, they decide to let the adult River make her own way in life and continue their travels.

Rory features prominently in "The Girl Who Waited", where he is confronted with the horrible consequences time travel has had on a version of his wife. In "The God Complex", he is the only one of the TARDIS crew who is not hunted by the creature that feeds on faith because of Rory's rational nature and lack of personal faith. The Doctor eventually realises the danger he is exposing his friends to and returns Amy and Rory to Earth, giving them a house and a car as exit presents. The Doctor next glimpses the couple in "Closing Time", some time after he left them. The pair appear in his life once again when River creates an alternate reality by refusing to kill the Doctor. They witness the Doctor marry River in the alternate universe before returning to the established course of events where the Doctor once again appears to die. Once reality is restored, however, they are visited by their daughter River, who tells them the secret that the Doctor is still alive, and that the version of him that died had been a robot duplicate. Though he wishes the world to believe he is dead, the Doctor joins Rory and Amy two years in their future for Christmas dinner in the Christmas special "The Doctor, the Widow and the Wardrobe".

Series seven opener "Asylum of the Daleks" (2012) establishes early on that Amy and Rory are set to divorce. The Daleks kidnap the Doctor to go on a mission for them, as well as kidnapping Rory and Amy on the day they are about to sign their divorce papers because they know the Doctor works better with companions. During the mission, the Doctor engineers a reconciliation between the two. The two discuss their feelings for each other. It is revealed Amy left Rory because she has been infertile since "A Good Man Goes to War", and she knew he wanted children. The Doctor subsequently embarks on sporadic journeys with the Ponds. Rory is said to be 31 years old at the time of "Dinosaurs on a Spaceship".

They rejoin him as permanent companions prior to their last adventure in "The Angels Take Manhattan". In this story, Rory is sent back to 1930s New York by a Weeping Angel, where he encounters River, and is tracked there by the Doctor and Amy, where he finds himself repeatedly the victim of Weeping Angels repeatedly attacking him and dislocating him in space and time. It is discovered he is in an Angel "battery farm", where they intend to trap him until he dies of old age. Rory even encounters his dying older self there. Amy and Rory jump from a building to create a paradox and destroy the Angels, but one survives and sends Rory back in time. Amy chooses to let it send her back in time as well, and due to the massive paradox the Doctor can never reunite with them. From a tombstone he learns that Rory died at age 82, and Amy at 87.

=== Other media ===
Rory appears alongside the Doctor and Amy in numerous Doctor Who stories found in the New Series Adventures novels, the 2in1 series chapter books, the Quick Reads novels, and original audiobooks.

In the online minisode "P.S." (2012), Rory writes a letter to his father Brian, revealing that he and Amy adopted a son in 1946 and named him Anthony Brian Williams. In the present day, Anthony delivers the letter to Brian and the two men embrace. In April 2020, Darvill reprised the role of Rory in the online minisode "Rory's Story" for Doctor Who: LOCKDOWN. The found footage minisode depicts Rory, living with Amy in 1946, dictating a book for Anthony.

On 12 June 2020, Big Finish Productions announced that Darvill would reprise the role of Rory Williams for The Lone Centurion - a series of audio adventures depicting Rory's two thousand years guarding the Pandorica. The first volume, Rome, was released in April 2021. The second volume, Camelot, was released in February 2022.

== Casting and characterisation ==
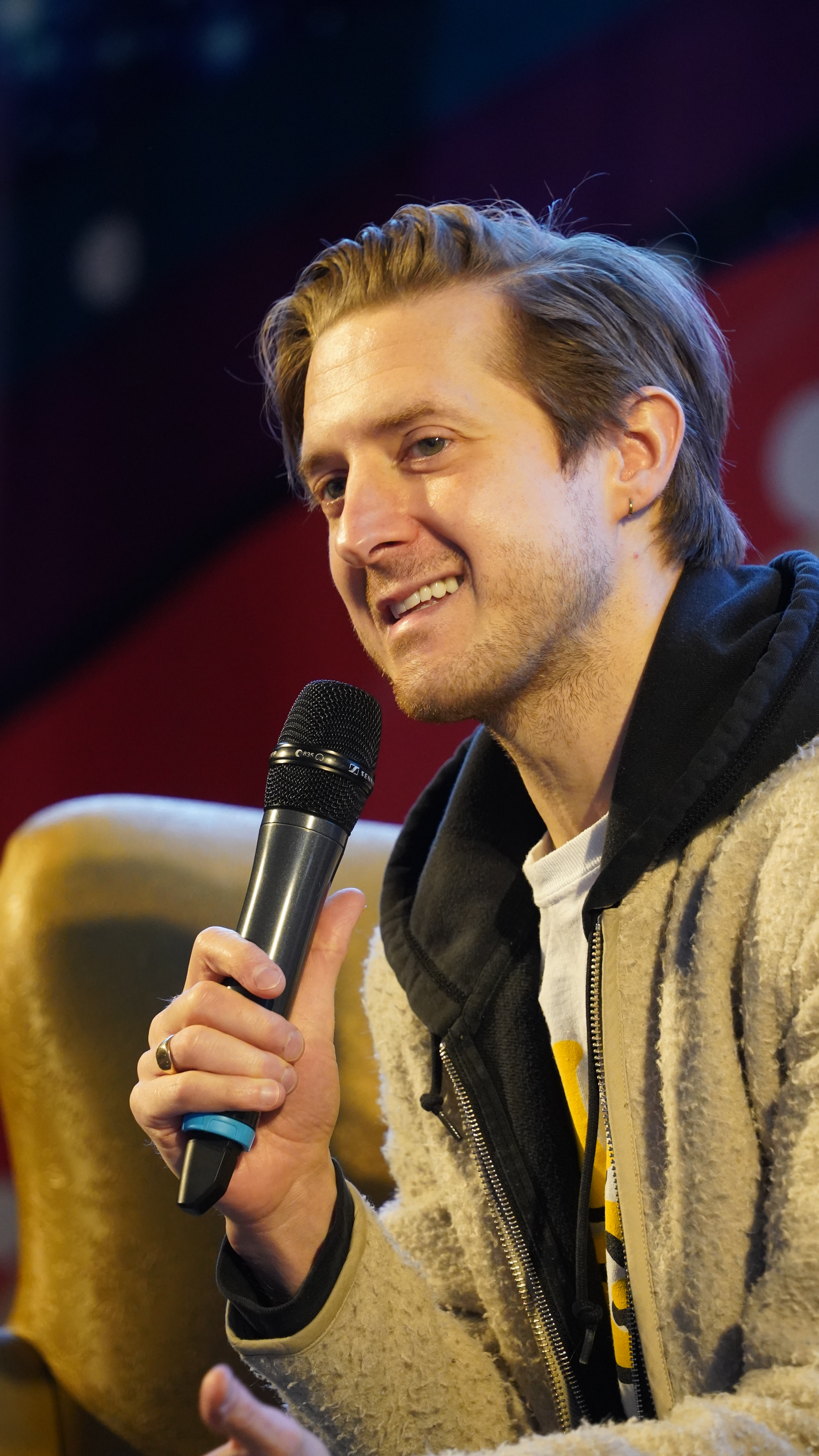
Arthur Darvill played Rory Williams.

For his audition, Arthur Darvill received two scenes from the first episode and one from the sixth, but beyond the fact Rory was Amy's boyfriend he was not informed of details of the character. Lead writer and executive producer Steven Moffat stated that what stood out about Darvill's audition was "just how funny" he was. Darvill felt "privileged" to be part of the show and was pleased with Rory's storyline. Darvill had previously worked with Matt Smith on a play called Swimming with Sharks. Darvill had his "fingers crossed" that he would become a regular, which he did with "A Christmas Carol".

Rory was a character who was "completely in love" with Amy, but Amy had things to do in life before admitting she loved him too. Moffat described Rory as someone who had grown up in the "shadow" of Amy's imaginary Doctor. Rory became a nurse because of this. Rory eventually evolves into a "bumbling action hero". Speaking of Rory's characterisation in the first series, actor Darvill felt that he was "on the outside looking into this world he was desperately trying to save Amy from." Executive producer Steven Moffat had intended to have a married couple on the TARDIS "from the off". Darvill stated of the couple's marriage that Amy will always "wear the trousers". However, he felt that Rory's marriage had stopped the character "feeling so unworthy." In regards to how Rory changed between series five and six, Darvill stated that "his sense of adventure has awoken" and that he is more comfortable with himself. Darvill was nervous being involved in such a popular and public series, but felt that this translated well into Rory's character, particularly as both he and Rory grew in confidence during their time on the series.

== Reception ==
Rory's frequent deaths in the programme have been subject to criticism. Digital Spy reviewer Morgan Jeffery wrote, "One of the key elements in Doctor Who is obviously the sense of danger and the lingering presence of death, but Rory's repeated demises and resurrections are now becoming so frequent that comparisons to South Park's Kenny seem almost inevitable." In a review for "The Doctor's Wife", Neela Debnath of The Independent announced that "Rory-gets-killed fatigue has now officially set in". On the other hand, SFX awarded Rory the third spot in the top 10 resurrections of science fiction TV, saying that "it's becoming a cliché. But it's not one we mind too much, mainly because it's always done with such gusto. Except, perhaps, in the pirates episode which was a fairly gusto free zone all round".

However, critics have celebrated the increased opportunities for Rory to be heroic in series 6. Following the airing of "A Good Man Goes to War", io9's Charlie Jane Anders compared the character to Wesley Wyndam-Pryce (Alexis Denisof), whose arc in the American television programmes Buffy the Vampire Slayer and Angel similarly saw him transition from laughable comic relief to a genuine warrior. Anders comments: "We're thrilled that Rory is getting his Wesley Wyndam-Pryce on. Badass Rory is, as we already observed, totally badass." Sam McPherson of Zap2it believed that Rory had the most character development of the characters in the fifth series, evolving into a "generally enjoyable character".

The Radio Times blog singled the character out for praise: "As a traveller in the Tardis, Rory probably speaks for the audience far more than past companions have. Sure, we all like to think we'd spring into action just like the Doctor. But in truth, if we joined an eccentric alien on a journey through time and space, we'd probably be more Rory than Rose." However, in 2015 Michael Hogan of The Daily Telegraph criticised the general portrayal of male companion figures in Doctor Who. He described Rory, alongside 2005–2006 character Mickey Smith (Noel Clarke) and 2014 character Danny Pink (Samuel Anderson) as all "basically soppy, sappy, slightly annoying plus-ones to far superior females".

Rory was named "TV Character of the Year" in the Virgin Media TV Awards in 2012. SFX named Amy and Rory the second-best science fiction and fantasy romance.
