= The Curse of the Black Spot =

215 – "The Curse of the Black Spot"
- Doctor Who episode

Cast
- Doctor: Matt Smith – Eleventh Doctor
- Companions: Karen Gillan – Amy Pond; Arthur Darvill – Rory Williams
- Others: Hugh Bonneville – Henry Avery; Oscar Lloyd – Toby Avery; Lee Ross – The Boatswain; Michael Begley – Mulligan; Tony Lucken – De Florres; Chris Jarman – Dancer; Carl McCrystal – McGrath; Lily Cole – The Siren; Frances Barber – Eye Patch Lady (uncredited)

Production
- Directed by: Jeremy Webb
- Written by: Stephen Thompson
- Produced by: Marcus Wilson
- Executive producers: Steven Moffat; Piers Wenger; Beth Willis
- Music by: Murray Gold
- Production code: 2.9
- Series: Series 6
- Running time: 45 minutes
- First broadcast: 7 May 2011

Chronology
← Preceded by "Day of the Moon"	Followed by → "The Doctor's Wife"

"The Curse of the Black Spot" is the third episode of the sixth series of the British science fiction television series Doctor Who. Written by Stephen Thompson, and directed by Jeremy Webb, the episode was first broadcast on 7 May 2011 on BBC One in the United Kingdom and on BBC America in the United States.

In the episode, the alien time traveller the Doctor (Matt Smith) and his companions Amy Pond (Karen Gillan) and Rory Williams (Arthur Darvill) land on board a pirate ship in the 17th century. The ship's crew is terrorised by a Siren-like creature. After receiving an injury, however minor, a black spot appears on their palms and then the creature apparently disintegrates them.

The producers wished to develop a pirate-themed episode for the sixth series and allow the protagonists to "kick back and have some fun" on the adventure. The episode was primarily filmed at a dock in Cornwall and Upper Boat Studios in Wales. "The Curse of the Black Spot" was seen by 7.85 million viewers and received generally mixed reviews from critics. It gained an audience Appreciation Index of 86 – considered excellent.

== Plot ==
=== Prequel ===
On 30 April 2011, immediately following the broadcast of "Day of the Moon", the BBC released a "prequel" to "The Curse of the Black Spot". The prequel consists of a short montage of atmospheric shots of the pirate ship, bridged by a narration in the form of Captain Avery's journal for "April the first, 1699; the good ship Fancy." Avery describes how his ship has been becalmed for eight days, and the crew are being taken one by one by "an enemy"; he fears that they are all doomed to die there.

=== Synopsis ===
In the 17th century, a pirate ship is stranded in the ocean, terrorised by a Siren-like creature who marks people with black spots on their palms after they are injured and appears to disintegrate them with her touch after putting them in a trance. Rory receives a cut during a tussle with the pirates, and finds a black spot on his hand, but is prevented from succumbing to the song of the Siren by Amy and the Eleventh Doctor. Surmising the Siren is using water as a portal, the Doctor instructs the crew to seek refuge in the ship's dry magazine. There, they find Toby Avery, the son of the ship's captain Henry Avery, who stowed away on the ship in order to join the crew after his mother died, unaware of his father's illicit deeds. He too has a black spot on his palm due to a fever. The Doctor and Avery fail to escape in the TARDIS, and the Siren takes it. After another shipmate is taken by the Siren in a dry room, the Doctor realises the Siren is using any reflection to appear, not just the water. In response they rid the ship of reflective surfaces, including the ship's stolen treasure.

When a storm begins, the crew start to set sail. Toby drops a polished crown while bringing his father a coat. The Siren is summoned and takes Toby. Soon, Rory falls into the ocean, and the Siren takes Rory. Believing the victims are not dead, the Doctor, Avery, and Amy agree to prick themselves to get the Siren to take them. The Siren's touch actually teleports them to an alien spaceship, invisible in the same spot the pirate ship is located. The Doctor finds the spaceship's crew long dead from exposure to a human disease. The trio then discover a sickbay where Avery's entire crew, Toby, and Rory are in medical care along with the TARDIS. The Siren turns out to be the ship's virtual doctor, caring for the injured humans; the black spots are tissue samples she uses as references to understand how to help them. Amy convinces the Siren to release Rory into her care. Using Rory's nursing knowledge, Amy and the Doctor remove him from life support and are able to resuscitate him. Meanwhile, Avery stays with his son on the ship and flies the spaceship with his crew.

=== Continuity ===
The historical pirate Henry Avery was previously mentioned in the 1966 serial The Smugglers, which deals with the search for "Avery's gold". "The Curse of the Black Spot" re-asserts unresolved plot points from the previous two episodes, "The Impossible Astronaut" and "Day of the Moon"; Amy and Rory express concern over the Doctor's future death, Madame Kovarian appears briefly to Amy, and the Doctor again uses the TARDIS scanner to perform a pregnancy test on Amy, the results of which remain unclear.

== Production ==
=== Writing and casting ===
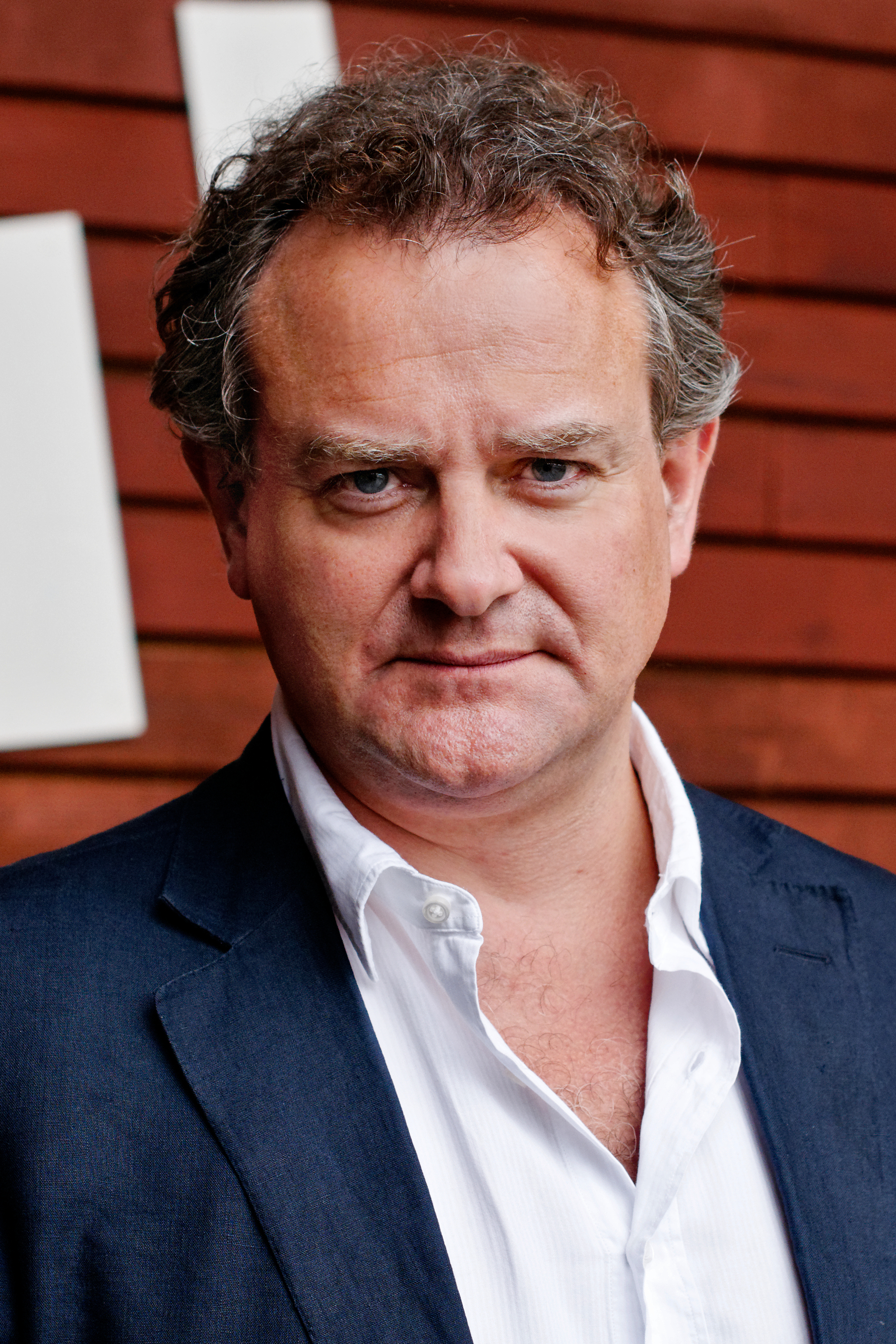
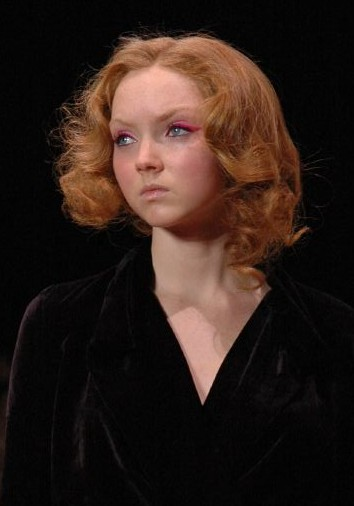
Hugh Bonneville played Henry Avery while Lily Cole was cast as the Siren in the episode.

In January 2011, it was announced that Downton Abbey actor Hugh Bonneville would make a guest appearance as a "pirate captain" in an episode of the sixth series of Doctor Who. Lead actors Matt Smith and Karen Gillan felt that working with Bonneville was "great fun." Bonneville previously played Sir Sidney Herbert and Tzar Nicholas I of Russia in the Seventh Doctor audio drama The Angel of Scutari. Later in February 2011, it was announced actress and model Lily Cole was cast as a sea creature. The producers were looking for an actress who is "beautiful," "striking," and yet somewhat "spooky." Cole came early into the casting suggestions, and accepted the role when she was approached.

The episode was written by Stephen Thompson. The producers wished to develop a Doctor Who episode set on "the high seas." The episode was also made to allow the Doctor and his companions to "kick back and have some fun." As the episode was pirate-themed, the producers wanted to fit in as many elements as possible from pirate fiction, including treasure, mutinies, a stowaway boy, walking the plank, storms, swords, and a pirate with a "good heart" who "isn't really evil." "The Curse of the Black Spot" was originally planned to be ninth in the series, but was moved forward prior to filming as executive producer Steven Moffat felt the first half of the series was too dark.

=== Filming and effects ===
Filming took place primarily in Cornwall and the Upper Boat Studios in Wales. The exterior of the pirate ship was filmed at a dock in Cornwall, while the lower decks were built from a set at the studio. The principal challenge to film at the dock was to ensure the audience would not see it. The crew set up smoke machines to simulate fog. To create the storm the crew used wind and rain machines, the latter of which went through 15,000 litres of water. The loud noise from the wind machines caused communication difficulties during takes. Anticipating they would get soaked, the cast present on the deck wore dry suits underneath their clothes. Before filming began on the storm sequences, actor Arthur Darvill heard that he would perform the stunt where he is thrown into the sea, and was willing to perform it. The stunt would later be performed by a double.

The scenes in which Cole appeared on the ship were done by using a harness as if she was flying. Because the actress wore a green dress and makeup, the normal greenscreen was replaced by bluescreens in the studio. Cole felt it was fun to fly on the harness, but found it painful after a few hours. Gillan was allowed to perform several of her own stunts in the episode. She was excited to learn that her character would fight pirates with swords, and was taught how to handle one with basic moves. Gillan was also allowed to swing across the ship. However, a stunt double was required to film the sequence where Amy is thrown across the deck by the Siren. The sickbay set was also built in a studio. Because the beds were attached to strings, they were prone to swaying. The cast members who were asked to lie on the beds were instructed to stay still and not breathe heavily to limit movement.

== Broadcast and reception ==
=== Broadcast and ratings ===
"The Curse of the Black Spot" was first broadcast on BBC One in the United Kingdom on Saturday, 7 May 2011, from 6:15 pm to 7pm. It was shown on BBC America in the United States the same day as the UK broadcast. In the UK, the episode received preliminary overnight ratings of 6.21 million viewers. Based on these estimated figures, viewership was up by 800,000 from "Day of the Moon". Final consolidated ratings for the episode increased to 7.85 million viewers, with a 35.5 per cent audience share. It was the second largest audience of the night, behind Britain's Got Talent on ITV1. In addition nearly one million viewed the episode on BBC iPlayer. It was given an Appreciation Index of 86, placing it in the "excellent" category.

=== Critical reception ===
The episode was met with generally mixed reviews from television critics. Dan Martin of The Guardian thought that "The Curse of the Black Spot" was "a little bit anticlimactic" in comparison to the opening two-part episode of the series, though it was "a nice old-fashioned runaround bolstered by some high concepts and cute moments", much like the classic episodes. He praised Lily Cole as the Siren but criticised the character of Avery. Martin later rated it the worst episode of the first twelve of the series (the finale, which had not aired at the time, was not included in the list). IGN's Matt Risley gave it an overall "good" score of 7 out of 10, admitting that there were "some great lines" and the "Space Pirate" twist was "a refreshingly sci-fi spin on the well-worn genre plot", but he criticised the Siren for lacking qualities to become "a credible and terrifying Who villain".

Gavin Fuller of The Daily Telegraph did not feel the episode was believable enough, citing Bonneville's performance, saying he "didn't come across as a ruthless, greedy killer despite what his crew claimed of him," and if the crew had been "nastier," it could have given more potency to the Siren threat. Fuller felt that Cole did "a decent enough job," claiming that the Siren was the "best-realised thing" about the episode, "only slightly ahead of Karen Gillan looking very fetching in a pirate outfit." Simon Brew of Den of Geek started by comparing the episode to Lost's "massive, intriguing" cliffhangers, "and then sauntered off to other less interesting stuff," mainly criticising that the little girl's regeneration in "Day of the Moon" was left unresolved. However, Brew "still enjoyed" "The Curse of the Black Spot", reacting positively to the episode's production values and the reveal of the black spots. Nick Setchfield of the science-fiction based magazine SFX opined that the high points of the episode were that it was "high on shivery maritime atmosphere," and the Doctor for not being "in instant possession of all the facts, but who reloads his thinking as events unfold." However, Setchfield was critical of the story, claiming "pirates and Who should be as combustive a mix as gunpowder and a trusty flintlock, but ultimately this grog-time yarn falls short of its promise."

Morgan Jeffery of Digital Spy wrote "following on from that game-changing two-part premiere, this week's Doctor Who provides us with a real change of pace, with a moody and atmospheric pre-titles sequence setting the scene for a far more traditional adventure." Jeffery praised the performance of Bonneville, but was critical of Cole's role for her not being "given much to do except float around and look ethereal," but added "the English model certainly looks the part, with well-judged special effects aiding her performance as the beautiful yet unsettling Siren." Jeffery also thought that Amy's revival of Rory was "well-acted by both Karen Gillan and Arthur Darvill," but criticised the series for the numerous "Rory's dead" scenes, negatively comparing Rory with the South Park character Kenny McCormick. Jeffery rated the episode three stars out of five for being somewhat underwhelming in comparison with "The Impossible Astronaut" and "Day of the Moon".
