= The Crimson Horror =

237 – "The Crimson Horror"
- Doctor Who episode
- Promotional poster

Cast
- Doctor: Matt Smith – Eleventh Doctor
- Companion: Jenna-Louise Coleman – Clara Oswald
- Others: Dame Diana Rigg – Mrs Gillyflower; Rachael Stirling – Ada; Catrin Stewart – Jenny Flint; Neve McIntosh – Madame Vastra; Dan Starkey – Strax; Eve de Leon Allen – Angie; Kassius Carey Johnson – Artie; Brendan Patricks – Edmund & Mr Thursday; Graham Turner – Amos; Scott Stevenson – Dipped Man; Olivia Vinall – Effie; Michelle Tate – Abigail; Jack Oliver Hudson – Thomas Thomas

Production
- Directed by: Saul Metzstein
- Written by: Mark Gatiss
- Produced by: Marcus Wilson
- Executive producers: Steven Moffat; Caroline Skinner
- Music by: Murray Gold
- Series: Series 7
- Running time: 45 minutes
- First broadcast: 4 May 2013

Chronology
← Preceded by "Journey to the Centre of the TARDIS"	Followed by → "Nightmare in Silver"

"The Crimson Horror" is the eleventh episode of the seventh series of the British science-fiction drama Doctor Who. It was written by Mark Gatiss and directed by Saul Metzstein, and was first broadcast on BBC One on 4 May 2013. It marks the 100th episode, including specials, since the return of Doctor Who on 26 March 2005.

Set in 1893 Yorkshire, the episode features the Victorian-era detectives Madame Vastra (Neve McIntosh), Jenny Flint (Catrin Stewart), and their alien butler Strax (Dan Starkey). The first half of the episode focuses on the detectives' search for their missing friend, the alien time traveller the Doctor (Matt Smith). In the second half, they team up with the Doctor and his companion Clara Oswald (Jenna-Louise Coleman) to prevent a plot by the chemist and engineer Mrs Gillyflower (Diana Rigg), who wishes to start a new world by wiping out all of humanity, apart from a community she deems as being "perfect".

The episode was the third appearance of Vastra, Jenny, and Strax – informally referred to as the "Paternoster Gang" – and was conceived as a pseudo-spinoff for the characters. The episode also included numerous homages in tone to Rigg's work in the British TV show The Avengers, specifically referencing Rigg's character in the show, Emma Peel. The episode was watched by 6.47 million viewers in the United Kingdom and received generally positive reviews from critics.

== Plot ==
=== Synopsis ===
In 1893, Silurian Madame Vastra, her human wife Jenny Flint, and their Sontaran butler Strax are asked to investigate a mysterious cause of death known as the "Crimson Horror", the victims of which are found dumped in the canal with bright red skin. The latest victim, Edmund, has the image of the Eleventh Doctor retained in his retina. Vastra, Jenny, and Strax travel to Yorkshire, where Jenny infiltrates Sweetville, a utopian community led by chemist and engineer Mrs Gillyflower and the never-seen Mr Sweet.

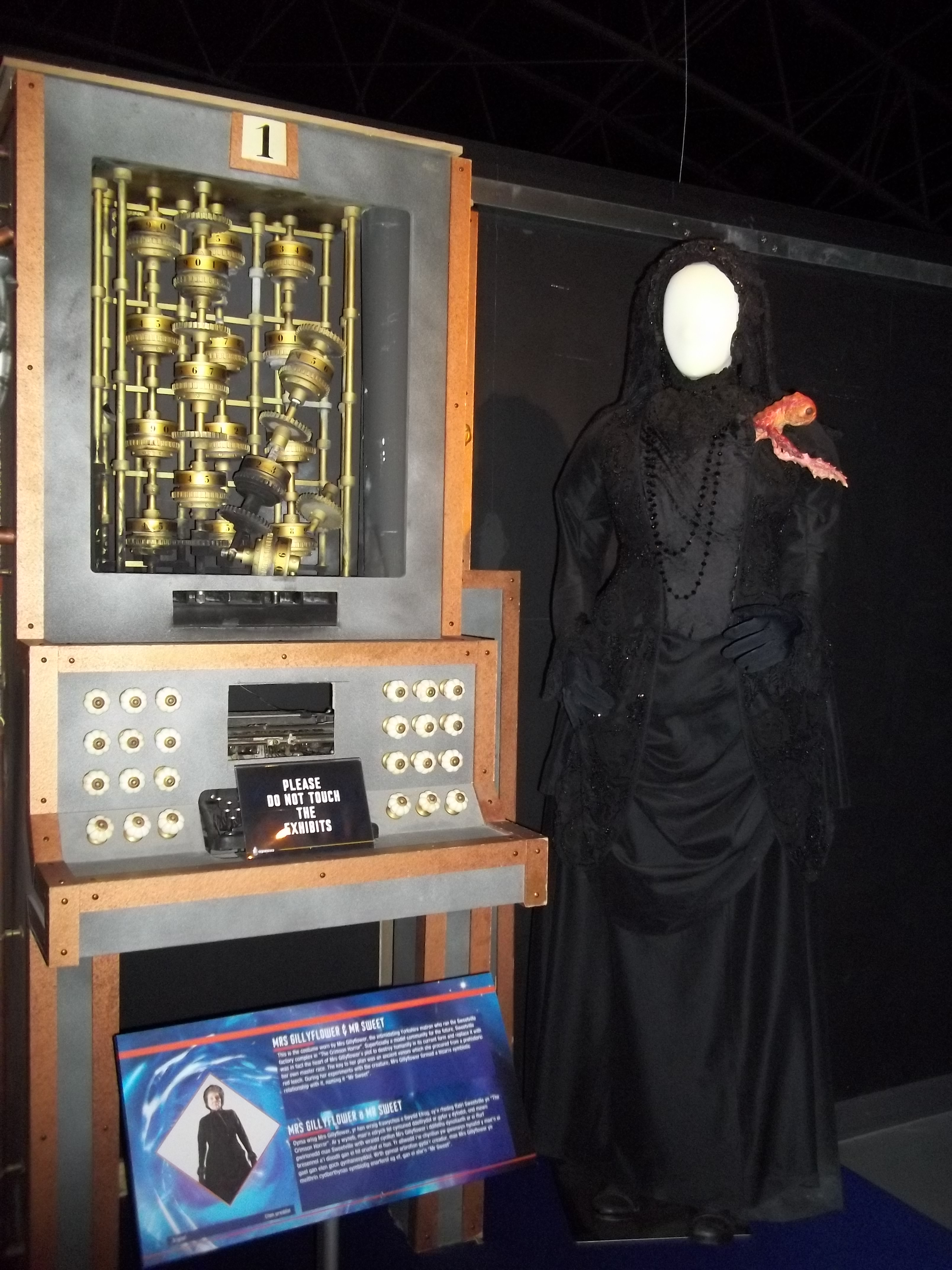
Mrs Gillyflower's costume, Mr. Sweet and the controls to launch the rocket, as shown at the Doctor Who Experience.

Jenny discovers the Doctor, who is chained up and exhibits red skin and a stiff stature. At his silent direction she puts him into a chamber to reverse the process. Once restored, he explains to Jenny that he and Clara were also investigating the Crimson Horror. They had also infiltrated Sweetville, but learned that they were to be preserved to survive an apocalypse. The process did not work on the Doctor because he was not human, and he was saved from being destroyed by Gillyflower when her blind daughter Ada had hidden him. The Doctor finds Clara and reverses the process on her.

Meanwhile, Vastra recognises that Sweetville is using the venom of a prehistoric red leech her people knew. The Doctor and Clara confront Mrs Gillyflower, who reveals that she plans to launch a rocket to spread the poison all over the skies; everyone on Earth will die except the people living in Sweetville, who will then start over to make a better world. "Mr Sweet" is also revealed to be a red leech from Vastra's prehistoric times that has formed a symbiotic relationship with Mrs Gillyflower. The Doctor berates Mrs Gillyflower for experimenting on Ada to get the preservation formula right. Clara smashes the controls to the rocket. However, Mrs Gillyflower holds a gun to Ada's head and heads into the rocket silo, which has been disguised as a chimney, to reach the secondary control.

Mrs Gillyflower launches the rocket, but Vastra and Jenny have already removed the red leech poison from it, rendering it worthless. Strax shoots at Mrs Gillyflower to stop her from killing the others, causing her to tumble over the stair railing and fall to her death. Ada kills Mr Sweet with her cane. When Clara returns home, she finds that the two children that she babysits for, Angie and Artie, have discovered photos of Clara from her trips to the past on the TARDIS on the Internet. They force her to take them on a trip in the TARDIS.

=== Continuity ===
When the Doctor arrives in Yorkshire, he mentions to Clara that he once spent ages trying to get a "gobby Australian" to Heathrow Airport, a reference to the Fifth Doctor's companion Tegan Jovanka and his efforts to get her back to Heathrow from Four to Doomsday to Time-Flight (1982). Further reference to Tegan is made when the Doctor tells Clara, "Brave heart, Clara," a phrase he often used when talking to Tegan.

In the flashback sequence, the Doctor says that the Romani people believe that the last image a dead person sees is retained on the retina. This is similar to a version that the Fourth Doctor tells the crew of Nerva Beacon just before he connects his mind to the dead Wirrn in The Ark in Space (1975). Upon arriving home, Clara discovers that the children she looks after have found historical photographs of her from 1974 ("Hide") and 1983 ("Cold War"). They also find an 1892 photo of Clara Oswin Oswald / Miss Montague ("The Snowmen"), whom they assume to be their Clara, who does not recognise it.

== Production ==
=== Writing ===
"The Crimson Horror" saw the return of Vastra, Jenny, and Strax from "The Snowmen". Executive producer Steven Moffat told Radio Times that the story would be from their point of view, for the audience "to see them tackle a case of their own, and stumble across the Doctor's path, quite accidentally". Moffat had planned to write the episode from the trio's point of view himself, but he realised he would not be able to and called his "old friend" Mark Gatiss. The initial pitch of the episode was "almost a Paternoster gang spinoff", featuring the author of the Sherlock Holmes books, Sir Arthur Conan Doyle. However, when Gatiss could not find a way to give Doyle a significant enough role in the story, his appearance was cut. The antagonist of the episode was originally intended to be "mummies" that were "all in black, sort of like Scottish widows", inspired by sufferers of the Phossy jaw condition.

The episode was specially written for mother and daughter Diana Rigg and Rachael Stirling. It was the first time the two had worked together on screen. Gatiss had worked on a play with Stirling, who mentioned that she and Rigg had never appeared in something together, and Gatiss offered to "tailor" them into his Doctor Who episode, for which he had devised the basic premise. Stirling said that Gatiss had written "an on-screen relationship between Ma and I that is truly delicious. We have never before worked together because the offers have not been tempting, but when such a funny and original script comes through you know the time has come." Gatiss stated that he wanted to write "a properly northern Who" and revealed that Rigg was able to use her native Doncaster accent for the first time.

=== Filming ===
The read-through for "The Crimson Horror" took place on 28 June 2012, with filming beginning on 2 July. Location filming occurred in Bute Town, Caerphilly and Tonyrefail. The scenes shot in the Sweetville streets were shot around the BBC's Cardiff studios. Production Designer Michael Pickwoad emphasised that the street had to be "almost too perfect" to demonstrate how the influence of Mrs. Gillyflower had corrupted it from within.

== Broadcast and reception ==
=== Broadcast ===
Professional ratings
Review scores
Source	Rating
The Daily Telegraph	5/5 stars
The A.V. Club	A-
Radio Times	5/5 stars
IGN	8.7
SFX	4/5 stars

"The Crimson Horror" was first broadcast in the United Kingdom on BBC One on 4 May 2013. Overnight ratings showed that it was watched by 4.61 million viewers live. The final consolidated rating was 6.47 million viewers, making it the lowest rated story of the season. It received an Appreciation Index of 85.

=== Critical reception ===
"The Crimson Horror" received generally positive reviews from critics. Ben Lawrence of The Daily Telegraph gave the episode five out of five stars, writing that it "crammed in idea after idea while still maintaining a terrific, breezy pace and delivering a fantastically satisfying story". He praised the way the Doctor and Clara did not enter the episode for fifteen minutes, which cut down on the amount of exposition. Guardian reviewer Dan Martin was positive towards the way the episode played with genre and form, saying that it "was as demented and creepy as the show should always be". Alasdair Wilkins of The A.V. Club described The Crimson Horror as a "fun episode" and a "romp", praising Stirling's performance and the episode's lighthearted tone. He too praised the episode's stylistic choices, also enjoying the decision to not have the Doctor or Clara appear until later in the episode.

Patrick Mulkern of Radio Times wrote that it had "decent mystery, a logical plot, a dollop of camp but perhaps most rewarding of all it's a danse macabre". He noted that the episode had "more than a dash of The Avengers", in which Rigg is famous for starring. IGN's Mark Snow gave "The Crimson Horror" a rating of 8.7 out of 10, calling it "the best yet" of this half of the season. He praised the humour and style, and commented, "the threat was never truly looming, nor was the scale as grand or epic as its recent predecessors, but that also meant that for once there was just enough story to fit into one sole episode". SFX reviewer Nick Setchfield gave the episode four out of five stars, describing it as "sufficiently sure-footed to waltz right to the brink of parody and no further". While he praised Rigg, he said that Stirling had "the stand-out performance". Graham Kibble-White, reviewer in Doctor Who Magazine, also gave it a positive review, calling it "bloody brilliant" and "a remarkably well-told tall tale, in which every element – including its name – radiates a real luminosity", describing the story as "a thoroughly wicked yarn full of sly jokes".

Digital Spy's Morgan Jeffery was more critical, giving the episode two out of five stars. He remarked that it felt like "filler" and criticised Rigg's character for being scripted as "an over-the-top cackling crone". However, he praised the emotional depth added by Stirling's character and the direction.

== In print ==
The Crimson Horror
- Author: Mark Gatiss
- Cover artist: Anthony Dry
- Series: Doctor Who book: Target novelisations
- Publisher: BBC Books
- Publication date: 11 March 2021
- ISBN: 978-1-785-94504-5

A novelisation of this story written by Mark Gatiss was released in paperback and digital formats 11 March 2021 as part of the Target Collection. An audiobook narrated by Dan Starkey and Catrin Stewart was released on the same day.

When writing the adaptation, Gatiss wanted to keep the pacing of it as close as possible to the episode, adding only one extra scene detailing Jenny's first meeting with The Doctor. The novel is written from the perspective of the Paternoster Gang, with portions of it narrated by Jenny and Strax. The novelisation is dedicated to Diana Rigg, who had died in September 2020.
