= The Rings of Akhaten =

233 – "The Rings of Akhaten"
- Doctor Who episode
- Promotional poster

Cast
- Doctor: Matt Smith – Eleventh Doctor
- Companion: Jenna-Louise Coleman – Clara Oswald
- Others: Emilia Jones – Merry Gejelh; Michael Dixon – Dave Oswald; Nicola Sian – Ellie Oswald; Chris Anderson – The Chorister; Aidan Cook – The Mummy; Karl Greenwood – Dor'een

Production
- Directed by: Farren Blackburn
- Written by: Neil Cross
- Produced by: Denise Paul; Marcus Wilson (series producer)
- Executive producers: Steven Moffat; Caroline Skinner
- Music by: Murray Gold
- Series: Series 7
- Running time: 44 minutes
- First broadcast: 6 April 2013

Chronology
← Preceded by "The Bells of Saint John"	Followed by → "Cold War"

"The Rings of Akhaten" is the seventh episode of the seventh series of the British science fiction television series Doctor Who, first broadcast on BBC One on 6 April 2013. It was written by Neil Cross and directed by Farren Blackburn.

In the episode, alien time traveller the Doctor (Matt Smith) takes his new companion Clara Oswald (Jenna-Louise Coleman) to the Rings of Akhaten, where several planetoids in a ring system are orbiting a larger planet. They attend a religious festival where the young Queen of Years, Merry Gejelh (Emilia Jones), is about to be sacrificed to the parasite of Akhaten.

Cross was asked to write the episode after the success of scripting and shooting "Hide", a later episode. "The Rings of Akhaten", as Clara's first trip to an alien world, was intended to show the wonders of the universe instead of the Doctor getting his new companion trapped somewhere less glamorous, a trend that had been observed in the history of the programme. The episode also explores Clara's backstory. Filmed entirely in-studio in late October 2012, pre-made moulds were utilised for the many different aliens to save money. "The Rings of Akhaten" was watched by 7.45 million viewers in the UK and received a mixed reception regarding its emotion and plot.

== Plot ==
=== Synopsis ===
The Eleventh Doctor, having seen Clara die twice before, decides to learn more about his new companion and travels into her past to observe her. He finds that her parents met by a chance encounter caused by a gust of wind blowing a leaf into her father's face and discovers that her mother died while Clara was a teenager. The Doctor goes back to the present and collects Clara, then takes her to the Rings of Akhaten, where they observe a series of planetoids in a ring system orbiting a planet, with a shining pyramid on one planetoid. The Doctor takes Clara to a giant alien marketplace where the currency is items of sentimental value. Clara then encounters a girl called Merry Gejelh, the Queen of Years. Merry tells Clara that she is hiding because she is supposed to sing a song at a ceremony and she is afraid to get it wrong. Clara reassures her by telling her what her mother once said, and Merry heads to the ceremony.

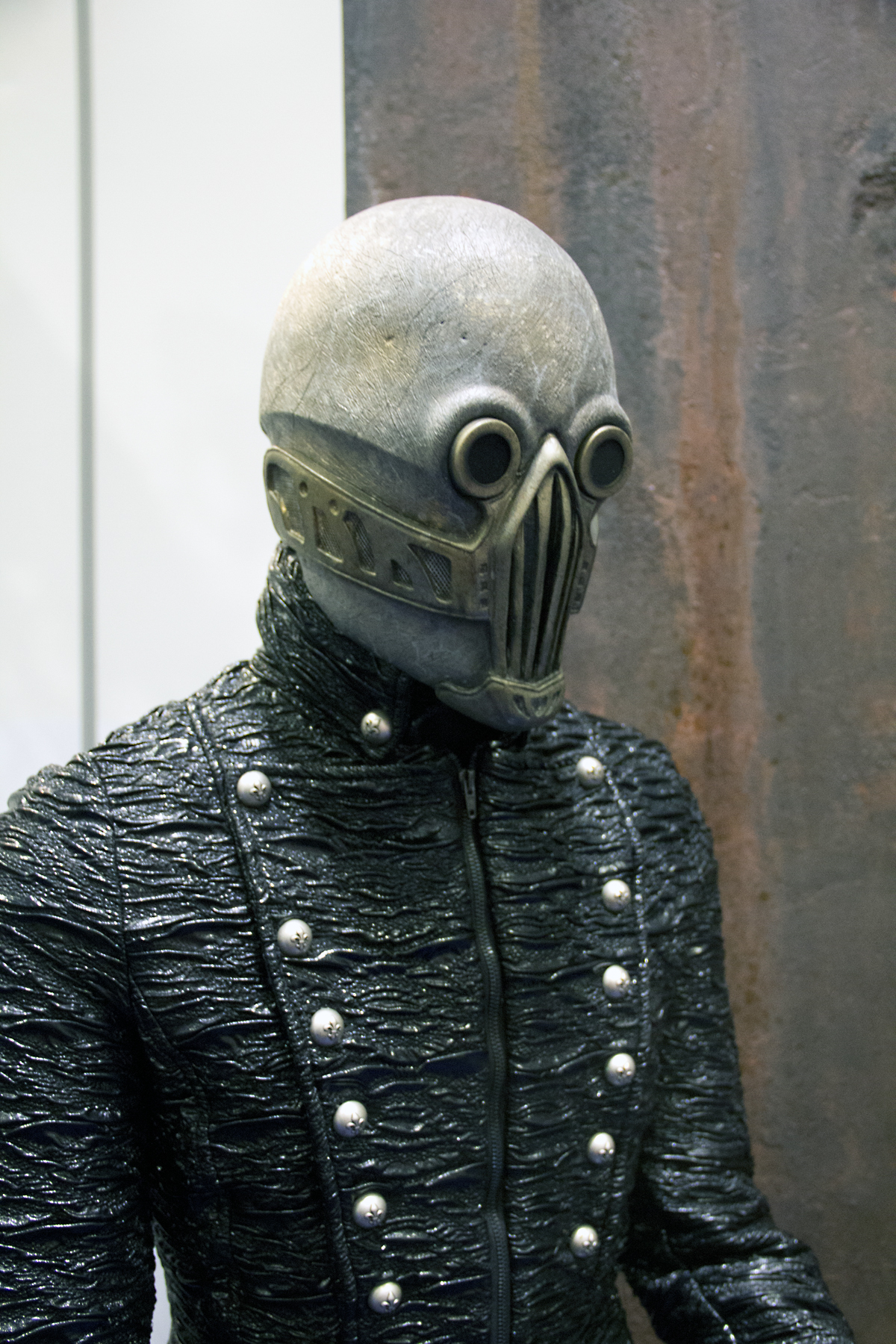
The Vigil as they appeared at a Doctor Who exhibition.

The Doctor and Clara attend the ceremony, where the Doctor explains that since the Rings were settled there has been a constant song sung to keep the Old God of Akhaten asleep. Merry begins singing, joined by a chorister at the pyramid. During the song, a beam of light from the pyramid envelops Merry, and she is pulled toward the pyramid to have her soul sacrificed to Akhaten. The Doctor and Clara rent a space bike which they ride to the pyramid. The Doctor promises Merry that she does not have to sacrifice herself and that he will stop Akhaten. The Doctor lets Clara and Merry escape from the pyramid, but Akhaten, a planet-sized parasitic creature, awakens.

Clara and Merry flee back to the ceremony and the Doctor faces the creature, realising it feeds off memories, stories, and feelings. He tries to overfeed it by offering the sum total of his Time Lord memories; Merry also leads the citizens in a song of hope, confusing Akhaten who then disappears. However, the Doctor's memories are not enough to sate the creature and Akhaten reappears. Clara returns to help, offering Akhaten the leaf that blew into her father's face on the day he met her mother, which contains an infinite amount of untold potential that Clara's mother never saw because she died early. Akhaten implodes on itself and the Rings are saved.

=== Continuity ===
In "The Bells of Saint John", the Doctor finds a preserved leaf pressed between the pages of Clara's book, 101 Places to See. Clara enigmatically refers to it as "page one". The opening scene in "The Rings of Akhaten" explains this statement, showing how a mishap involving the leaf led to her parents' first meeting. The Doctor mentions to Clara that he had visited Akhaten long ago with his granddaughter. This is a reference to Susan Foreman, the Doctor's granddaughter and companion who travelled with the First Doctor.

=== Outside references ===
In his speech to Merry Gejelh, the Doctor cites Lewis Carroll's poem "The Walrus and the Carpenter" when he mentions "...shoes and ships and sealing-wax [...] cabbages and kings...".

== Production ==
Writer Neil Cross was a Doctor Who fan, but had never had the time to write an episode. Executive producer Caroline Skinner, who was new with the seventh series, knew him and offered to work his schedule around writing an episode; he was willing to do it. Executive producer and lead writer Steven Moffat was pleased to have Cross join, as he was a showrunner in his own right with Luther. Cross had written the ninth episode of the series, "Hide", which was liked by the producers and so Cross was asked to write "The Rings of Akhaten" when he was in the UK after "Hide" had completed filming. "The Rings of Akhaten" was given the seventh episode slot originally intended for a script written by writer Chris Chibnall, freed after Chibnall had to back out due to writing and producing the ITV mystery crime drama series Broadchurch at the same time. Actor Jenna-Louise Coleman named "The Rings of Akhaten" one of her favourites of the second half of the seventh series, as it was the first adventure for Clara which allowed the audience to watch the story "[begin] again".

The concept behind having the episode based around an alien planet occurred to Moffat, Skinner, and producer Marcus Wilson when realising they had done big location pieces in the first half of the series with "A Town Called Mercy" and "The Angels Take Manhattan", but had none for the second half. They decided to do a story set in "a world created in our studios to make you really feel you're out there", rather than having the Doctor "promise unearthly wonders to his companions, and then get them trapped in an underground tunnel". As such, the episode was designed to allow the Doctor to actually show his new companion the wonders he had promised. The production team aimed to show "the best alien planet" on Doctor Who. The episode originally had a different pre-credits sequence, which consisted of a long scene in the kitchen in which Clara informs the Doctor she cannot come and travel with the Doctor because she has responsibilities to her job, and the boy she takes care of asks if the Doctor is her boyfriend. Cross's intent was to juxtapose this "mundane" scene with the vast scale of the planet. However, Moffat thought that at the time in the series the Doctor should be investigating Clara through her parents and Cross revised to include the leaf, an idea Moffat approved of. Originally the resolution was to be the Doctor defeating the planet with his speech, which Cross likened to "facing down one of Lovecraft's Old Gods: an alien so alien that it's practically a supernatural being." Moffat pointed out that the Doctor had given similar speeches before and was more interested in Clara saving the day. After thinking about it for a while, Cross realised he could incorporate the leaf into the solution.

The read-through for "The Rings of Ahkaten" was held on 17 October 2012, with filming beginning the next week on 22 October. Director Farren Blackburn had previously worked on the programme in the 2011 Christmas special "The Doctor, the Widow and the Wardrobe". According to actor Matt Smith, there were "between 50 and 60 prosthetic aliens" in a scene set in an alien market. The Doctor features minimally in the first act because Smith was busy filming pick-ups or reshoots for "Nightmare in Silver". Millennium FX's Neill Gorton remarked that he had "always wanted to do a scene like the Star Wars cantina" and had worked on different moulds in his spare time in case they could be used in the future, as making thirty different aliens at one time would be out of the budget. Much of the episode was constructed around talks of what could be created with limited resources. For example, Cross recalled that producer Marcus Wilson called him and asked, "We've always wanted to have a speeder-bike like in Return of the Jedi and we know how to do it inexpensively, so can you get one into the story?" However, Cross felt that the speeder-bike ended up having more in common with Flash Gordon. The songs were written by composer Murray Gold. To help establish the year at the beginning of the episode "Ghost Town" by The Specials is heard and the Doctor is seen reading a 1981 copy of The Beano. The issue of The Beano was reprinted and included in a special Doctor Who-themed edition on 15 May 2013.

== Broadcast and reception ==
"The Rings of Akhaten" was first broadcast in the United Kingdom on BBC One on 6 April 2013. Overnight ratings showed that it was watched by 5.5 million viewers live, a 28.8% audience share. When time-shifted viewers were factored in, the final rating rose to 7.45 million, making it the sixth most-watched programme of the week on BBC One. In addition, "The Rings of Akhaten" received over two million requests on the online BBC iPlayer in April, coming in first for the month on the service. The episode also received an Appreciation Index of 84 out of 100.

=== Critical reception ===
The episode received mixed reviews. Neela Debnath of The Independent called it "heart-warming" and felt that centering the episode around a child "adds something". She also praised the aesthetics and the caring nature of Clara's character. Zap2it's Geoff Berkshire shared similar sentiments, and also praised Emilia Jones' performance. Both Debnath and Berkshire likened the storytelling to the Russell T Davies era (2005–2010). The Guardian reviewer Dan Martin described the story as "slight and straightforward [but] told it in broad and effective strokes" with "gorgeous" visuals. He particularly praised the emotional effectiveness of the ending, but felt that "The Mummy", although visually impressive, was "a little bit of a squib after all the build-up".

IGN's Mark Snow gave "The Rings of Akhaten" a rating of 7.2 out of 10. He wrote that Akhaten "felt like a fully formed world" but criticised the resolution and the Mummy's appearance. Gavin Fuller of The Daily Telegraph gave the episode three and a half out of five stars and called it "a mixed bag ... but still with enough elements of uniqueness to demonstrate, almost 50 years on, just why there is still nothing like Doctor Who on television". He wrote that the religion and singing was well-realised, but felt the "mind parasite" was too similar to the Great Intelligence which was featured the previous week, and also thought the many aliens "gave more than a hint of trying too hard and did not get things off to the best of starts". Digital Spy reviewer Morgan Jeffery praised Clara and the monsters, but felt that after a good build-up the episode fell apart at its climax, which he felt was "far too fantastical".

SFX reviewer Richard Edwards was more negative, giving the episode three stars out of five. He felt that the story had a lot of interesting ideas but then became standard. He also criticised the use of the sonic screwdriver and the Doctor's monologue, which he felt had been overused too much recently, but said that the episode was saved by Clara. Patrick Mulkern of Radio Times was also disappointed, saying that it "amounts to little more than series of events and has a more preposterous premise than usual". He questioned the physics and noted that there was not much of an ending and surprisingly found Smith not up to his usual performance. Doctor Who Magazine reviewer Graham Kibble-White also reacted negatively, writing, "There wasn't a wet eye in the house, as pathos run nauseatingly amok," and claimed it "by some stretch the least awesome Doctor Who we've encountered for a long time." He also claimed it seemed like "Cross hadn't seen an episode since the 1980s" and that "even the leftfield mention of the Time War feels as if it's come from a quick consult with Wikipedia." Additionally, he felt that it could be "mockable" and complained that it was "turning the aliens into a freak show, something to be goggled at, rather than truly met."

Cross acknowledged that "The Rings of Akhaten" had received a mixed reception and was originally bothered by some of the criticisms. However, he said he was cheered up by children between the ages of nine and fifteen who had experienced bullying and wrote to him saying that they had been inspired by the episode. One girl told him it had changed her mind about suicide.
