= The Bells of Saint John =

232 – "The Bells of Saint John"
- Doctor Who episode
- Promotional poster

Cast
- Doctor: Matt Smith – Eleventh Doctor
- Companion: Jenna-Louise Coleman – Clara Oswald
- Others: Celia Imrie – Miss Kizlet; Robert Whitlock – Mahler; Dan Li – Alexei; Manpreet Bachu – Nabile; Sean Knopp – Paul; James Greene – The Abbott; Geff Francis – George Maitland; Eve de Leon Allen – Angie Maitland; Kassius Carey Johnson – Artie Maitland; Daniella Eames – Little Girl; Fred Pearson – Barista; Jade Anouka – Waitress; Olivia Hill – Newsreader; Isabella Blake-Thomas – Child; Matthew Earley – Man; Antony Edridge – Pilot; Richard E. Grant – The Great Intelligence

Production
- Directed by: Colm McCarthy
- Written by: Steven Moffat
- Produced by: Denise Paul; Marcus Wilson (series producer)
- Executive producers: Steven Moffat; Caroline Skinner
- Music by: Murray Gold
- Series: Series 7
- Running time: 45 minutes
- First broadcast: 30 March 2013

Chronology
← Preceded by "The Snowmen"	Followed by → "The Rings of Akhaten"

"The Bells of Saint John" is the sixth episode of the seventh series of the British science fiction television programme Doctor Who. It premiered in the United Kingdom on 30 March 2013 on BBC One; the episode was the first of the second half of the series. It was written by Steven Moffat and directed by Colm McCarthy.

The episode marks the third appearance of Jenna-Louise Coleman as Clara Oswald, but her first official appearance as the Eleventh Doctor's new companion. The story focuses on alien time traveller the Doctor (Matt Smith) and his search for Oswald, following two previous encounters with her in different moments of time, both ending in her death. Finding a third version in present-day London, he soon becomes involved in saving her and the rest of Earth from Miss Kizlet (Celia Imrie) and her employer, the Great Intelligence, as they use the world's Wi-Fi to upload people to a datacloud via robots known as Servers, casually referred to as Spoonheads.

"The Bells of Saint John" was designed to be an "urban thriller", in that it is taking "something omnipresent in your life and making it sinister". It was watched by 8.44 million viewers in the UK. The episode received generally positive reviews, although several critics felt that the plot and threat were lacking.

== Plot ==
=== Prequel ===
On 23 March 2013, the BBC released a short prequel video to the episode, written by Steven Moffat. In the prequel, the Eleventh Doctor is sitting at the swings of a children's playground when he meets a little girl. They talk about losing things, and the Doctor states that he has lost someone twice and he hopes he might be able to find her again. The girl tells him that, when she loses something, she goes to a quiet place for a think, and then can remember where she put it. As the girl leaves, it is revealed that she is Clara Oswald.

=== Synopsis ===
The Doctor has retreated to a monastery in Cumbria in 1207 to contemplate the mystery of Clara Oswald, a woman he had met twice previously but who died both times. The Doctor answers the exterior phone on the TARDIS when it starts ringing. On the other end is Clara, whom the Doctor initially does not recognise. Clara, having been given the TARDIS' number by "a woman in the shop" and believing it is a computer help line, asks for help to connect to the Internet. When Clara repeats a phrase that previous versions of Clara have said, the Doctor realises who she is. He sets off to meet her.

Arriving in present-day London, the Doctor finds Clara's mind being "uploaded" via a mobile robotic server disguised as a young girl using the Wi-Fi. The Doctor halts the upload and successfully reverses it, sending a message that Clara is under his protection. The Doctor and Clara are outside when the uploaders cause an airplane to descend at them. The Doctor and Clara board the TARDIS and land on the plane, and the Doctor saves it from crashing.

The Doctor and Clara travel to a café. Clara uses computer skills that she picked up from her uploading experience to track the uploaders to their base at The Shard. The Doctor encounters people inside the café under the control of Miss Kizlet, who explains that living human minds are being fed to her client. Miss Kizlet distracts the Doctor long enough for a server disguised as the Doctor to upload Clara's mind completely. An angered Doctor reprograms this server and sends it out to Miss Kizlet's office inside The Shard. The Doctor server demands that she release all the minds that have been uploaded, but Miss Kizlet refuses. The Doctor then uses the server to upload Miss Kizlet to the network. Trapped in the network, she orders her subordinates to release her. But the only way they can release her is to release everyone, which they do, and so everyone else, including Clara, is restored.

The restored Miss Kizlet contacts her client, the Great Intelligence, to report her failure to him. The Great Intelligence orders her to reset all people working there, including herself, clearing their memories in the process. Meanwhile, the Doctor takes Clara home and offers her a chance to travel with him, which she refuses. She tells him to come back the next morning, as she may change her mind by then.

=== Continuity ===
Summer Falls, the book that Clara spots Artie, one of her charges, reading is written by "Amelia Williams", the married name of the Doctor's previous companion Amy Pond; she had been a travel writer in the 21st century (Note: In "The Power of Three") before being permanently sent back to the early 20th century, and becoming the editor of her daughter's detective novel/guidebook. (Note: In "The Angels Take Manhattan")

The Great Intelligence makes its second appearance in a row after appearing in the preceding episode, "The Snowmen". In the intervening time, the Great Intelligence has encountered the Doctor's second incarnation twice, once in the Himalayan mountains during the 1930s (Note: In The Abominable Snowmen) and once in the London Underground in the 1970s. (Note: In The Web of Fear)

The woman in the shop who gave Clara the Doctor's number is brought up in "Deep Breath". The Twelfth Doctor remarks it seems as if someone is trying to bring the Doctor and Clara together. The episode "Death in Heaven" reveals it was the Master (as Missy) who gave the number to Clara.

== Production ==
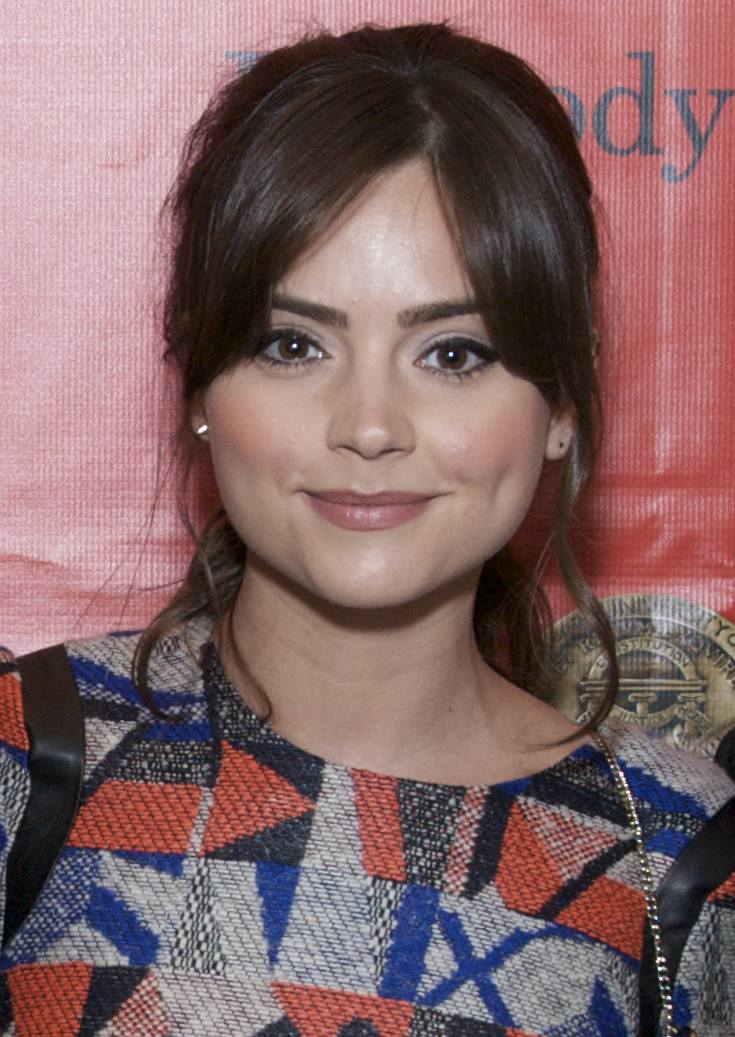
"The Bells of Saint John" features the debut of the third version of Jenna-Louise Coleman's character, Clara Oswald, and is the beginning of the character's companionship.

Writer Steven Moffat described the premise as

the traditional 'Doctor Who' thing of taking something omnipresent in your life and making it sinister, if something did get in the Wi-Fi, we'd be kind of screwed. Nobody had really done it before, so I thought, 'It's time to get kids frightened of Wi-Fi!'

However, he denied that his intention was to give a warning about technology, but rather tell an adventure story about a "new way [for aliens] to invade" based on something viewers were familiar with. Producer Marcus Wilson suggested that the episode be an "urban thriller", as the story would already be set in contemporary London to introduce Clara and the Wi-Fi monsters. Moffat compared the style to James Bond and The Bourne Identity. Moffat said that the episode was "an action roller coaster" rather than a story intended to be scary.

Despite being announced as the actress to portray the new companion, Jenna-Louise Coleman had first appeared as two different characters, called Oswin and Clara respectively, in "Asylum of the Daleks" and "The Snowmen", but "The Bells of Saint John" introduces the character who will be the Doctor's travelling companion. Coleman played each version of the character as a different individual with "trust that there would be a payoff" to her mystery. Moffat described this version of Clara as "more real-world", and actor Matt Smith stated that Clara "reignites [the Doctor's] curiosity in the universe and gives him his mojo back".

The read-through for "The Bells of Saint John" took place on 19 September 2012 at Roath Lock. It is the first Doctor Who episode to be directed by Colm McCarthy. Filming began on 8 October; some occurring in London, at the Westminster Bridge and alongside the River Thames, with motorbike scenes at the London locations shot around 16 October 2012. The rooftop scenes were filmed at Grange St Paul's Hotel. The location was intended to be in Covent Garden, but was changed to a location with a better view of The Shard.

== Broadcast and reception ==
"The Bells of Saint John" first aired in the United Kingdom on BBC One on 30 March 2013, and on the same date in both the United States on BBC America and in Canada on Space. It aired on 31 March in both Australia on ABC1, and in South Africa on BBC Entertainment. The episode aired on 11 April in New Zealand on Prime.

The episode received an overnight rating of 6.18 million viewers in the UK, peaking at 6.68 million, a 29.8% audience share; which put it in third place for the night. When time-shifted viewers were accounted for, the figure rose to 8.44 million viewers, placing second for the week on BBC One. "The Bells of Saint John" also received 0.96 million requests on BBC iPlayer for March, and 1.3 million requests for April. The episode received an Appreciation Index of 87. In 2013 the episode received 2.61 million iPlayer views.

=== Critical reception ===
"The Bells of Saint John" received generally positive reviews, but several critics felt underwhelmed by the story. Nick Setchfield of SFX gave the episode four-and-a-half out of five stars. He was positive towards the visual style and the plot, as well as the performances of Smith, Coleman, and Celia Imrie. A Radio Times reviewer was pleased that Coleman was playing Clara as a straightforward companion, and highlighted her chemistry with Smith. He described it as "a hugely enjoyable episode that revels in its modern London setting", praising the way its ideas were realised visually on-screen. MSN's Hilary Wardle gave "The Bells of Saint John" episode four out of five stars, noting that it moved at a fast pace and the plot was similar to "The Idiot's Lantern" (2006) but was "very well done". She especially praised the chemistry between Smith and Coleman.

Ben Lawrence, writing in The Daily Telegraph, gave the episode four out of five stars, saying that it had much to "enthral" a present-day viewer and showed how Doctor Who was constantly reinventing itself. A similar statement was made by Euan Ferguson of The Observer, who also wrote that the episode was "splendid" with good villains, though he felt that the plot was "insanely complicated" and hard to understand. Digital Spy's Morgan Jeffery also rated "The Bells of Saint John" four stars, feeling that the threat "leaves a little to be desired" and the Spoonheads' physical appearance was not memorable. However, he said that "practically everything else here is wonderful", especially Clara's new characterisation. IGN reviewer Mark Snow rated the episode 8.2 out of 10. He praised the Wi-Fi concept but was underwhelmed by the Spoonheads, and felt that it was more low-key than it was promoted.

The A.V. Club's Alasdair Wilkins gave "The Bells of Saint John" a grade of B, explaining that the plot suffered just as previous companion introductions had because the threat was secondary to establishing Clara. He also wrote that the episode "struggles to make all its chosen genre elements compelling" and was not positive towards the menace of the Wi-Fi and questioned how realistic the technology seen was. Despite this, he said that it was still "fun" with good performances. Dan Martin of The Guardian was disappointed, writing that it "makes a hearty meal of its iconic London locations ... But after the tour de force that was "The Snowmen", it feels as though this handsome episode constantly just misses the mark". He found the monsters and plot familiar to past episodes, but noted that a "generic" opening episode had been common for the show when it was introducing a new companion, which was done successfully with Clara. Neela Debnath in The Independent echoed similar sentiments, feeling that it did not live up to the hype and reused several elements from previous episodes. Jon Cooper of the Daily Mirror wrote that "The Bells of Saint John" "had its moments" but "as a whole it didn't reach the heights of previous episodes". While he welcomed the departure in tone, he felt that the set-pieces were shoehorned in, and also expressed concern that Clara, despite Coleman's success, was too similar to previous companion Amy Pond (Karen Gillan).

In Doctor Who Magazine, Graham Kibble-White gave it a positive review, describing it as "zestful and exciting Doctor Who." He complimented the fact that "the action sequences are played at a fury and the current anything's-possible flourishes continue unabated". He noted that "there's something pointless but pleasing in having Clara's charge, Artie, reading Summer Falls–a book written by Amelia Williams". Additionally, he described the Spoonheads as "a very effective threat, albeit written as one of the foot soldiers of the Doctor Who world, with only the verbal facility to paraphrase back what's been said," and stated that "the revelation of the concave absence at the back of the skull is horrific." However, he complained that to him, Clara's guess that the TARDIS was a "snogging booth" seemed like "something a 13-year-old boy would conjure, not a 24-year-old woman".
