= Journey to the Centre of the TARDIS =

236 – "Journey to the Centre of the TARDIS"
- Doctor Who episode
- Promotional poster

Cast
- Doctor: Matt Smith – Eleventh Doctor
- Companion: Jenna-Louise Coleman – Clara Oswald
- Others: Ashley Walters – Gregor van Baalen; Mark Oliver – Bram van Baalen; Jahvel Hall – Tricky van Baalen; Sarah Louise Madison, Ruari Mears, Paul Kasey – Time Zombies

Production
- Directed by: Mat King
- Written by: Stephen Thompson
- Produced by: Marcus Wilson
- Executive producers: Steven Moffat; Caroline Skinner
- Music by: Murray Gold
- Series: Series 7
- Running time: 45 minutes
- First broadcast: 27 April 2013

Chronology
← Preceded by "Hide"	Followed by → "The Crimson Horror"

"Journey to the Centre of the TARDIS" is the tenth episode of the seventh series of the British science fiction television series Doctor Who. It was first broadcast on 27 April 2013 on BBC One and was written by Stephen Thompson and directed by Mat King.

In the episode, the alien time traveller the Doctor (Matt Smith) forces a salvage crew (played by Ashley Walters, Mark Oliver, and Jahvel Hall) to rescue the Doctor's companion Clara Oswald (Jenna-Louise Coleman). Clara is lost in the depths of the sentient spaceship and time machine the TARDIS after its engines become damaged by the salvage crew's beam.

The story was based on showrunner Steven Moffat's frustrations with the 1978 story The Invasion of Time which intended to explore the interior of the TARDIS but due to budgetary issues, had to be reduced in scale. The episode was filmed almost entirely at Roath Lock studios. The episode was watched by 6.5 million viewers and received mixed to positive reviews.

== Plot ==
The TARDIS is caught by the magnetic tractor beam of a space salvage ship, damaging it. Clara pleads with the Eleventh Doctor to fix it, but he claims there is no "big friendly button" that can fix everything. Clara spots a strange egg-like device roll across the floor and tries to grab it but burns her hand. The ship jolts and the two are thrown into darkness.

The Doctor awakes to find himself on the salvage ship, manned by the Van Baalen brothers: Gregor, Bram, and Tricky. The Doctor forces the brothers to cooperate with him to rescue Clara. Gregor orders Bram to start salvaging the console, during which he is killed by an ossified humanoid creature. The TARDIS traps Gregor, Tricky, and the Doctor in a loop of corridors to prevent the theft of its systems. The Doctor recovers Clara and finds the TARDIS engines are damaged due to the leakage of time caused by the incident, and they must go to the engine room to prevent it from exploding.

The Doctor confesses that the ossified creatures which killed Bram and chased Clara are themselves from the future and tries to prevent that future from happening. However, Gregor and Tricky contact themselves and become a conjoined ossified creature seen earlier. The Doctor and Clara flee towards the engine. The Doctor, thinking they are going to die, asks Clara to explain who she is and how she could have died twice before. Clara does not understand, and the Doctor realises that she has no knowledge of their previous encounters and is simply a young woman.

Reaching the engine room, they find the engine has exploded but the TARDIS has placed the room in time stasis as a safety measure. Clara looks at her hand, the burn marks formed into words: "big friendly button". The Doctor realises that they need to go back to the point of the disaster and activate the remote control for the tractor beam – the device Clara picked up – to stop the tractor beam and prevent the disaster. The Doctor crosses through a time rift and gives the remote to his younger self, with a button marked "big friendly button" for him to press. Time resets to before the events of the episode. The TARDIS vanishes from the Van Baalens' scanner, and the Doctor and Clara continue their journey, with Clara not remembering her conversation with the Doctor.

== Production ==
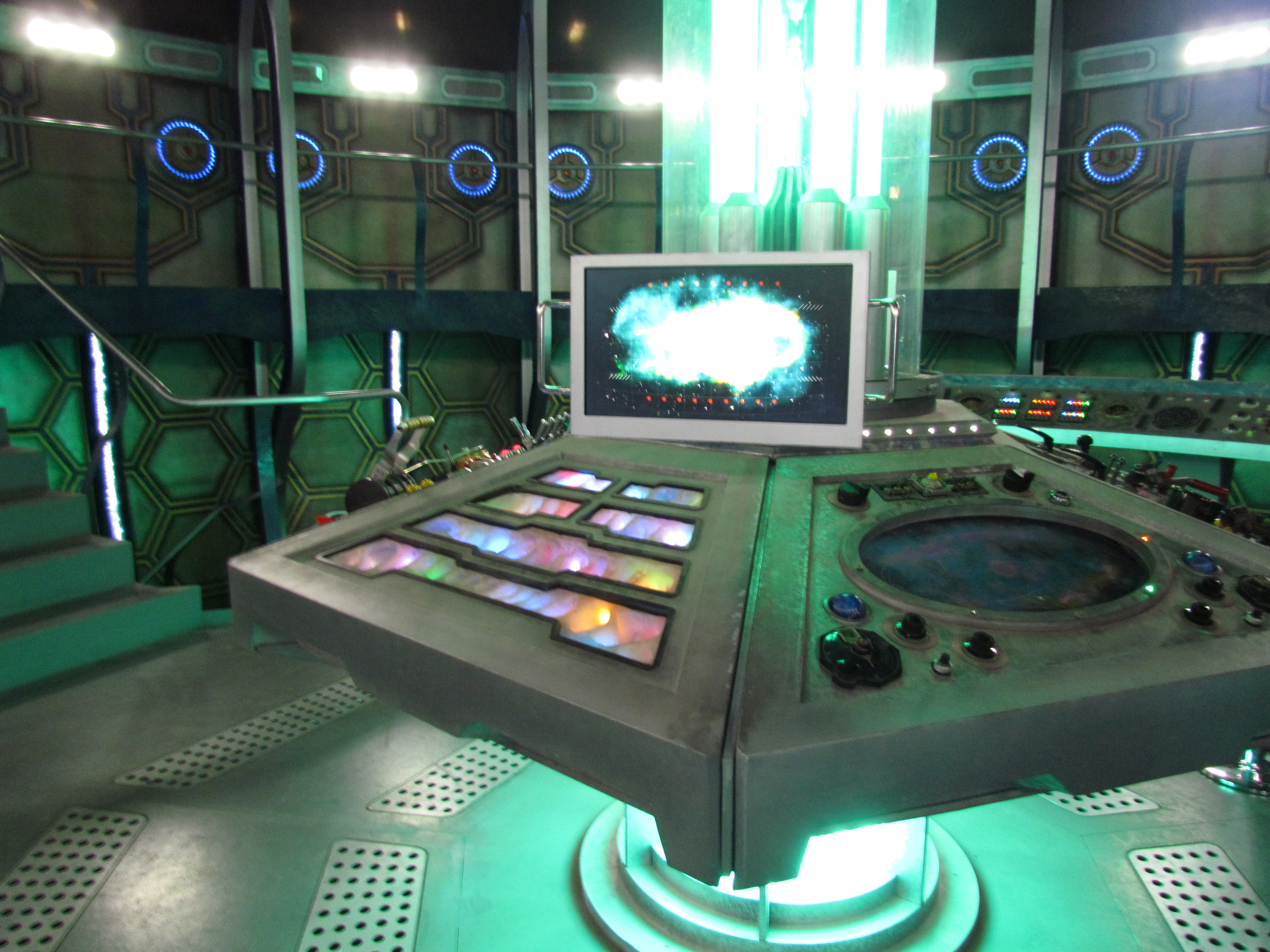
The TARDIS set

Lead writer and executive producer Steven Moffat gave the concept of an episode discovering the centre of the TARDIS to writer Stephen Thompson. Thompson explained that this was because Moffat was "haunted" by the 1978 story The Invasion of Time, which was set on the TARDIS but had no new sets built in the studios, with the story, instead, having to film in a disused hospital. Thompson was also interested in mathematics and remarked, "anything involving multi-dimensional geometry gets me excited". Moffat left the rest of the story to be developed by Thompson. Thompson initially intended for the TARDIS to become disturbed by adolescents during a school trip but Thompson changed the encounter to a salvage crew when Moffat objected. The title is in reference to Jules Verne's science fiction novel Journey to the Centre of the Earth. It is the first Doctor Who episode to be broadcast with "TARDIS" in the title. Ashley Walters's character Gregor van Baalen was originally intended to be a cyborg and Jahvel Hall's character was originally called Sander rather than Tricky. Also changed was a scene in which Clara explores a room of discarded possessions from earlier companions; this was simplified to her discovering Amy Pond's toy TARDIS and the Doctor's cot. The episode was originally supposed to be the eleventh episode in place of "The Crimson Horror".

A preliminary script for the episode was finished in June 2012. It had its read-through on 29 August 2012 at Roath Lock studios, following the day's filming for "The Snowmen". "Journey to the Centre of the TARDIS" was produced alone as the seventh filming block of the production schedule. Filming took place from 4 to 24 September, mostly on studio sets at Roath Lock studios. The scenes involving the Hornet ship were shot on 4 September at a warehouse on Celtic Way in Newport with footage of the TARDIS being caught by the magnetic tractor beam also being filmed at Roath Lock on 4 and 5 September. The majority of TARDIS scenes were filmed 6–11 September. Filming of Cardiff Castle substituting for the TARDIS library also took place on 11 September. Material featuring the Eye of Harmony was filmed on 12–14 September. Filming was interrupted as Jenna Coleman was ill on 17 September: effects and insert shots were filmed that day. Regular filming with Coleman resumed, with more shots of the engine room and console room taking place 18–19 September. The final shots of the console room were filmed on 24 September. Insert shots then took place on 18 October and 27 November. The final shot was the scene where the Doctor and Clara enter the defensive front of the TARDIS's engine room, which was filmed on 28 November at the Argoed Isha Quarry in the Vale of Glamorgan.

Guest star Ashley Walters came into conflict with the producers on his first day of filming when he tweeted a picture of himself in his costume in his trailer with the word "space". The picture was immediately removed.

== Broadcast and reception ==
=== Broadcast and ratings ===
The episode first aired in the United Kingdom on BBC One on 27 April 2013. Overnight ratings showed that 4.9 million viewers watched the episode live. When final ratings were calculated, the figure rose to 6.5 million, the seventh most-watched programme of the week on BBC One. In addition, "Journey to the Centre of the TARDIS" received 1.19 million requests on the online BBC iPlayer for the four days it was available in the month of April, making it the tenth most-watched programme on the service for the month. It received an Appreciation Index of 85.

=== Critical reception ===
"Journey to the Centre of the TARDIS" received mixed to positive reviews. Dan Martin of The Guardian felt that the ending would upset fans for "audaciously" mocking them and that the episode "frustratingly ... advances the arc before striding right back to square one". He praised the "creepy" side of the episode and wrote that the guest acting saved the underdeveloped plot of the three brothers. Digital Spy's Morgan Jeffery gave the episode five out of five stars, describing it as "an absolute treat for Doctor Who fans" as well as casual viewers, and said that the resolution was "not just a running gag but a timey-wimey, reset twist that actually works on a logical and a dramatic level, and doesn't feel like a cheat". He also praised the production values as an improvement from past episodes. However, he felt that the nature of the plot did not allow Clara to do much besides run and scream.

IGN's Mark Snow gave "Journey to the Centre of the TARDIS" a score of 8.5 out of 10. He was disappointed by the amount of time spent in corridors, but was positive towards the monster. He praised the "showdown" between the Doctor and Clara, though criticised how it was erased by a "no doubt polarising deus ex machina ending". Radio Times reviewer Patrick Mulkern described the episode as "a reasonably entertaining, playfully timey-wimey adventure, with lots of nice touches". While he praised the set design and the performance of Coleman, he wished for a more consistent style of the TARDIS as seen in the classic series and called the three brothers "a singularly inept bunch of clods". Neela Debnath of The Independent wrote that the episode was "fun" but mostly "an excuse to explore the [TARDIS]", with an insubstantial plot and three supporting characters who were difficult to care about. She wrote that "the aesthetics do add value to this adventure, in particular the Doctor's library".

Writing for SFX, Dave Golder gave "Journey to the Centre of the TARDIS" three out of five stars. He particularly criticised the plot for being "average" and "a reasonable, bog-standard, sci-fi corridor run-around complete with handy-dandy reset button ending". He felt that the episode had a lot of missed opportunities, and called the three brothers "bland and forgettable". Gavin Fuller of The Daily Telegraph gave the episode one and a half stars, also finding "wasted opportunities" and that it seemed "like a rehash of old Who". Fuller wrote that "the only redeeming feature was the spiky development of the Doctor/Clara relationship" but felt that this "was nowhere near enough to save this deadly dull episode".

Graham Kibble-White gave it a mostly negative review in Doctor Who Magazine. He described the episode as being "all about thrills". However, he complained that the episode lacked nuance or subtlety, and described the Van Baalens as "the show's most poorly acted siblings since the Sylvest twins" and the revelation of Tricky not being an android as one of the "all-time stupid Doctor Who plot points". Additionally, he complained that the Doctor's fake threat to destroy the TARDIS felt out of character. However, he admitted "Murray Gold's superlative soundtrack holds it together", and later described the story as "big, loud, dumb fun".
