= Doctor Who series 7 =

2012–13 season of British sci-fi TV series

Doctor Who
- Series 7
- DVD box set cover art
- Showrunner: Steven Moffat
- Starring: Matt Smith; Karen Gillan; Arthur Darvill; Jenna-Louise Coleman
- No. of stories: 13
- No. of episodes: 13 (+2 specials)

Release
- Original network: BBC One; BBC One HD
- Original release: 1 September 2012 – 18 May 2013

Season chronology
- ← Previous; Series 6 Next → 2013 specials

The seventh series of the British science fiction television programme Doctor Who was broadcast concurrently on BBC One in the United Kingdom, and was split into two parts as the previous series had been. Following its premiere on 1 September 2012, the series aired weekly with five episodes until 29 September. The remaining eight episodes were broadcast between 30 March and 18 May 2013. The 2012 Christmas special, "The Snowmen", aired separately from the main series and introduced a new TARDIS interior, title sequence, theme tune, and outfit for the Doctor. The series was the seventh to air following the programme's revival in 2005 and is the thirty-third season overall.

Doctor Who's seventh series was the show's third and final series to feature Matt Smith, Karen Gillan, and Arthur Darvill. They reprised their roles of the Eleventh Doctor, Amy Pond, and Rory Williams respectively, from the previous series. Gillan and Darvill departed the series in the fifth episode, "The Angels Take Manhattan", after which a new companion named Clara Oswald joined the Doctor, played by Jenna-Louise Coleman, remaining with the series for its second half. The main story-arc of the series focused on the significance of the character of Clara, whom the Doctor had encountered twice before as Oswin in "Asylum of the Daleks" and as a governess in "The Snowmen". It also features the recurring appearance of the Doctor's enemy, The Great Intelligence, who is later revealed to be trying to gain the Doctor's true name for his own purposes. Smith stayed for one year longer than Gillan and Darvill, and departed after the 2013 specials, with his final appearance being in the 2013 Christmas special "The Time of the Doctor".

== Episodes ==
As with Series 6, this series was again split into two parts. For the first time in the show's history, each episode of this series is a standalone story with no multi-parters.

No. story	No. in series	Title	Directed by	Written by	Original release date	UK viewers (millions)	AI
Special (2011)
225	–	"The Doctor, the Widow and the Wardrobe"	Farren Blackburn	Steven Moffat	25 December 2011	10.77	84
The Doctor crash-lands on Earth in 1938. He is helped back to the TARDIS by Madge Arwell. Three years later, Madge's husband Reg has disappeared while piloting an Avro Lancaster bomber in the Second World War, but she keeps it a secret from her two children, Lily and Cyril. They evacuate London to stay at a house in Dorset, where the Doctor masquerades as the caretaker. Cyril is lured through a present, which is a portal to a winter planet. Looking for Cyril, the Doctor and Lily and later Madge enter the box; Madge encounters miners, who plan to harvest the trees. Lily and the Doctor follow Cyril's tracks to a tower where wooden humanoids attempt to put a crown on Cyril, which will allow the souls of the trees to escape. When Madge arrives, she is deemed strong enough to pilot the top of the tower to safety. When they land, Reg is alive as he had followed the light from the tower and landed safely. The Doctor turns down Christmas dinner with the family and visits Amy and Rory, two years after he last saw them.
Part 1
226	1	"Asylum of the Daleks"	Nick Hurran	Steven Moffat	1 September 2012	8.33	89
The Doctor, Amy, and Rory are kidnapped by the Daleks, who explain that a planet they use as an asylum must be destroyed, but to do that its force-field must be disabled. The field has already been ruptured due to the crash-landing of a young woman, Oswin Oswald one year previously. The Daleks provide the three with bracelets to protect them against the planet's defense system, which will convert visitors into Dalek puppets. Although they are guided by Oswin, who has hacked into the planet's systems, the converted remains of Oswin's crew steal Amy's bracelet. The Doctor goes to find Oswin, as she claims to be able to disable the planet's force-field, and Oswin hacks into the Dalek psychic link and erases all memory of the Doctor from the Daleks. The Doctor discovers that Oswin has been fully converted into a Dalek, yet she still believes herself to be human. She ultimately realises the truth, but lowers the force-field and the Doctor, Amy, and Rory escape via teleporter before Daleks destroy the planet. The Doctor returns to the Dalek Parliament to find they have no memory of him due to Oswin's interference.
227	2	"Dinosaurs on a Spaceship"	Saul Metzstein	Chris Chibnall	8 September 2012	7.57	87
The Doctor attempts to prevent the destruction of an unmanned spaceship with a cargo of dinosaurs alongside Amy, Rory, Rory's father Brian, Queen Nefertiti, and big-game hunter John Riddell. The Doctor and his companions discover that the ship is a Silurian ark designed to carry the reptilian humanoids to a new planet along with flora and fauna from their time period. They find that a man named Solomon had killed the Silurian inhabitants in order to sell the dinosaurs on board, and goes after Nefertiti after seeing her value. The Doctor foils Solomon's plan and prevents the missiles from destroying the ship, but does not extend mercy to Solomon.
228	3	"A Town Called Mercy"	Saul Metzstein	Toby Whithouse	15 September 2012	8.42	85
The TARDIS accidentally lands in Mercy, a town in the American West around 1870. The TARDIS crew discovers that the town's doctor, Jex, is an alien being sought by the cyborg Gunslinger. The Doctor discovers Jex was a scientist who experimented on volunteers to create cyborgs to fight in a war on his home planet; the Gunslinger is seeking revenge for what was done to him. The Doctor faces a moral dilemma of whether he should offer Jex to the Gunslinger; he devises a plan to help Jex escape, but Jex commits suicide to save more innocent people from being harmed. The Doctor saves the Gunslinger from self-destruction and makes him the marshal of Mercy.
229	4	"The Power of Three"	Douglas Mackinnon	Chris Chibnall	22 September 2012	7.67	87
Amy and Rory begin to wonder whether they should choose between normal life and "Doctor life." Many black cubes appear around the world, and the Doctor stays with the Ponds to investigate but the cubes are inactive and the Doctor leaves UNIT in charge. A year goes by and the cubes suddenly begin activating random features before stopping the hearts of one-third of humanity. The Doctor eventually tracks the cubes to the Shakri, who plan to eliminate humanity before they can colonise in space, believing them to be an infestation. The Doctor reverses the electric pulse used to stop people's hearts and destroys the Shakri ship. At Brian's urging the Doctor takes Amy and Rory back as full-time companions.
230	5	"The Angels Take Manhattan"	Nick Hurran	Steven Moffat	29 September 2012	7.82	88
The Doctor takes Amy and Rory to Central Park. While the Doctor is reading Amy a novel about Melody Malone, Rory is taken by a Weeping Angel on his way back from getting coffee. In 1938 New York City, Rory meets River Song, the author of the novel. The Doctor and Amy use the novel to break their way into 1938 and find Rory, while he and River investigate the Angels' takeover of Manhattan. At the Winter Quay hotel, they find an aged Rory on his deathbed. The Angels created the hotel in order to keep their victims and maintain a constant source of potential energy. To escape his fate, Rory and Amy jump off the top of the building to their deaths, creating a paradox. Waking up in a graveyard with the TARDIS, Rory is transported by a surviving Angel. As the Doctor begs Amy to come back into the TARDIS, she bids him a tearful farewell and allows the Angel to send her back to Rory. Later, the devastated Doctor reads an afterword by Amy in the novel, telling him all is well and requesting he visit young Amelia Pond as she waits for him.
Special (2012)
231	–	"The Snowmen"	Saul Metzstein	Steven Moffat	25 December 2012	9.87	87
Depressed after the loss of Amy and Rory, the Doctor hides himself in Victorian London. The "Great Intelligence", a form of "memory snow" which can mirror the thoughts of anything around it, hatches a plot to create an army of ice people. While Strax drives the Doctor around, they run into Clara, a barmaid. The Doctor refuses to investigate the snowmen and returns to the TARDIS, in a cloud above London, accessible via a staircase. Clara soon returns to her job as a governess and learns of the danger to all of humanity. She turns to the Doctor for help and he takes action. With Madame Vastra, Jenny Flint, and Strax, the Doctor and Clara defeat the Great Intelligence and its human servant. In the process, the Doctor regains his enthusiasm, deciding to take Clara on as his companion. However, Clara is thrown off the edge of a cloud and falls to her death. The Doctor discovers Clara's full name – Clara Oswin Oswald – and realises that Clara is the same person as Oswin Oswald. He concludes that she is likely still alive in some other time and leaves in the TARDIS to find her.
Part 2
232	6	"The Bells of Saint John"	Colm McCarthy	Steven Moffat	30 March 2013	8.44	87
The Doctor manages to find another version of Clara in the present day. Meanwhile, Miss Kizlet and her employees at The Shard are using walking Wi-Fi base stations nicknamed "Spoonheads" to upload people's souls to a datacloud, allowing her client the Great Intelligence to grow stronger. The Doctor saves Clara from this fate by tricking Miss Kizlet into returning all the souls back to their bodies. The Great Intelligence erases all memory of working for him from the employees' minds, effectively making them innocent of any wrongdoing. The Doctor invites Clara to be his companion, but she requests that he come back the next day; she wants time to think about it.
233	7	"The Rings of Akhaten"	Farren Blackburn	Neil Cross	6 April 2013	7.45	84
The Doctor investigates Clara's past, finding nothing unusual but discovering that her mother died when she was young. When he returns to Clara, she requests that she be taken to see "something awesome". The Doctor takes her to the Rings of Akhaten, a ring system orbiting a large planet where the local religion believes life began. The society's currency is items of sentimental value. Clara runs into a young girl named Merry Gejelh, who is about to be sacrificed in the Festival of Offerings to appease the Old God. The Doctor and Clara save Merry and discover that the Old God is really a parasite of memories and sentiment that lives inside the large planet. Clara offers it her treasured leaf that caused her parents to meet, and as she points out that there are infinite possibilities to every choice, she defeats the parasite.
234	8	"Cold War"	Douglas Mackinnon	Mark Gatiss	13 April 2013	7.37	84
The Doctor and Clara attempt to land in Las Vegas; however, the TARDIS instead lands in a Soviet submarine in 1983 and takes off without them. To the Doctor's surprise, he finds an Ice Warrior, the famed Grand Marshal Skaldak, who had been thawed out of the ice after 5000 years. However, Captain Zhukov distrusts both the Doctor and Clara and has Skaldak chained up to prevent damage to the submarine. By Martian Law, Skaldak now considers that humanity as a whole has declared war on the Ice Warriors. The Doctor tries to convince Skaldak that he and Clara are peaceful; when Skaldak believes no other Ice Warriors are left, he exits his armour to begin forensic analysis of human bodies. Skaldak tricks Lieutenant Stepashin into revealing the circumstances of the Cold War, and prepares to start an alternate timeline by firing off a single nuclear missile. However, Clara manages to convince him that it would be wrong to end innocent lives, just as an Ice Warrior ship arrives and retrieves Skaldak. Out of danger, the Doctor's sonic screwdriver tells him the Hostile Action Displacement System had been activated and sent the TARDIS to the South Pole.
235	9	"Hide"	Jamie Payne	Neil Cross	20 April 2013	6.61	85
Thinking empathic psychic Emma Grayling may be able to shed some light on Clara, the Doctor goes to 1974, where Emma and her future husband Prof. Alec Palmer are investigating a ghost known as the Witch of the Well, in Caliburn House. After the house grows cold and the message "help me" appears, the Doctor borrows Alec's camera and uses the TARDIS to take pictures of the mansion's location throughout time. Thanks to this, the Doctor learns it's not a ghost in the pictures, but a time traveler named Hila Tacorian who got stuck in a pocket dimension; she's running from a hideous creature. The Doctor quickly constructs a device that amplifies Emma's psychic abilities, creating a portal to the pocket dimension. Emma cannot keep the portal open long enough for the Doctor to escape. Clara manages to persuade the TARDIS to briefly fly through and collect the Doctor, who hangs on to the exterior and is dragged back to reality. The Doctor explains Hila is a descendant of Emma and Alec. The Doctor realises another creature was inside the mansion and its mate was the creature in the pocket dimension; he quickly returns to save it.
236	10	"Journey to the Centre of the TARDIS"	Mat King	Stephen Thompson	27 April 2013	6.50	85
The TARDIS is picked up by a salvage crew, knocking Clara into the depths of the TARDIS. The Doctor promises the Van Baalen brothers the salvage of a lifetime to rescue her. The Doctor locks everyone in to save Clara. Clara runs from a molten creature and discovers the TARDIS library, where she finds the Doctor's real name. Reunited, everyone races to the engine room, which is damaged by the Van Baalens' "magno-grab", and the Doctor reveals the molten zombies are their future selves, resulting from staying too long in the room housing the Eye of Harmony. The Doctor and Clara arrive in the engine room, where he confronts her about her other lives; Clara has no clue about her other lives, making the Doctor happy to know she's not the one responsible. Clara asks the Doctor about his name. The Doctor sends a remote control device to his past self through a time fissure so the earlier Doctor can send the TARDIS to a different location just as the Van Baalens detected it. This rewrites the moment the Van Baalens pick up and damage the TARDIS and erases Clara's memories.
237	11	"The Crimson Horror"	Saul Metzstein	Mark Gatiss	4 May 2013	6.47	85
Madame Vastra, Jenny and Strax investigate the mystery of the "Crimson Horror." Bodies have been found completely red, with a substance on them Vastra recognises from before the Silurians went into hibernation as the venom of an ancient leech, in a diluted version. An investigator shows Vastra optographs, one of which shows the Doctor, screaming. As Sweetville, run by Mrs. Gillyflower, proves suspicious, Jenny is sent to investigate and find the Doctor. She succeeds, finding him a victim of the venom, but still alive; he quickly reverses the process for him and Clara. Confronting Mrs. Gillyflower, they discover "Mr. Sweet" working with Mrs. Gillyflower is one of the leeches; she plans to use his venom to preserve humanity by making a rocket with it explode. However, the rocket goes off without the venom on board, thanks to Vastra and Jenny. Strax shoots at her, and Mrs. Gillyflower tumbles and dies, after being revealed to have tested Mr. Sweet's venom on her daughter. Mr. Sweet is killed by Ada's cane. Once Clara is back home, she finds that the Maitland children have found photos of her from her travels, along with a picture of Victorian Clara.
238	12	"Nightmare in Silver"	Stephen Woolfenden	Neil Gaiman	11 May 2013	6.64	84
Because Artie and Angie are blackmailing Clara, the Doctor decides to take the children to Hedgewick's World Of Wonders; however, it has long been abandoned since the Cyber-wars. Seeing strange insects, the Doctor decides to stay; at the same time, the Emperor of several galaxies has also gone missing. Cybermites, the upgraded versions of Cybermats, graft a cybernetic piece to the Doctor's head, giving him a split personality, the Cyber-Planner; they agree to play chess to win complete dominance over their shared mind. The Cybermen, now faster and sleeker, capture Artie and Angie, putting them under their mind control. The Cyber-Planner makes the Doctor sacrifice his queen piece to free the children. The Doctor makes a half-bluff, gets a neural shock device, amplifies it, and fries the headpiece. Now free, the Doctor sees there's no way to stop the Cybermen unless they blow up the planet; Porridge, someone who worked with Wibbly to con customers, is revealed to be the missing Emperor. Porridge voice-activates a bomb, getting everyone and the TARDIS teleported to an imperial ship. Clara rejects an offer of marriage from Porridge and the Doctor returns everyone home.
239	13	"The Name of the Doctor"	Saul Metzstein	Steven Moffat	18 May 2013	7.45	88
An imprisoned murderer tells Madame Vastra that the Doctor's secret will be taken to his grave. She uses a soporific to bring herself, Jenny and Strax to a conference call in their dreams; she sends a letter to Clara to include her. River Song attends, and explains Vastra misunderstood the message; it is his grave that has been discovered. The Whispermen kidnap Vastra's group, while Clara awakens and informs the Doctor, making him realise the prophecy the Silence predicted is unfolding. At Trenzalore, the Doctor's resting place is a dying, monolithic TARDIS. Inside, the Great Intelligence waits for them; it demands the Doctor speak his true name to unlock the TARDIS. When the Doctor refuses, River speaks it instead. The Doctor explains that the TARDIS houses his entire timeline. The Great Intelligence steps into it and scatters itself throughout the Doctor's life, to rewrite all his victories into defeats. Clara follows after it, becoming two of the echoes of herself that the Doctor met. The Doctor enters his own timeline to rescue Clara, after she discovers a previously unseen incarnation of the Doctor that apparently broke the promise that goes with the epithet.

=== Supplemental episodes ===
Title	Directed by	Written by	Original release date
"Good as Gold"	Saul Metzstein	Children of Ashdene School	24 May 2012
Amy reminds the Doctor he needs to have an adventure once in a while, the Doctor complies and sets the TARDIS to its "adventure setting." After a series of malfunctions, the ship lands in the middle of the London 2012 Olympic Games, where they are visited by a panicked Olympic runner, who claims he is being chased. His pursuer is revealed as a Weeping Angel, who is seeking to seize the Olympic Flame and rob the planet of the good will and spirit it symbolises. The Doctor vanquishes the Angel with the sonic screwdriver, and the runner resumes his mission. Before he leaves, he gives the Doctor his gold medal. As the Doctor prepares to embark on another adventure with Amy, the Weeping Angel begins to reform.
Pond Life	Saul Metzstein	Chris Chibnall	27–31 August 2012 (online); 1 September 2012 (BBC Red Button Service)
Originally titled The Last Day of the Ponds, the five mini-episodes were produced to focus on Amy and Rory's life outside of their travels with the Doctor, immediately preceding 'Asylum of the Daleks'. The mini-adventure premiered on the BBC's Doctor Who website. An omnibus version was shown on 1 September 2012 on the BBC Red Button service and later made available on YouTube. While at home, Amy and Rory receive the Doctor's calls, learning of what he is up to. The Doctor arrives at their home warning them of a danger to the people on Earth, but arrives too early for Amy and Rory to understand what he is talking about, and leaves. Amy and Rory find an Ood the Doctor saved from a conflict sitting on their toilet after it wanders out of the Doctor's TARDIS. When the Doctor calls again after returning the Ood home, he finds no one is home; he deletes his call. Unknown to him, Amy has kicked Rory out and is wishing the Doctor will come.
"P.S."	N/A	Chris Chibnall	12 October 2012 (online)
A mini episode, depicted in simple drawings, of a letter from Rory to his father Brian explaining that they will never see each other again, and introduces Anthony Brian Williams, the adopted son of the Ponds. The scene was originally intended to be included on the DVD release, but was not filmed due to actor availability problems. Due to popular demand to see a conclusion to Brian, the scene was constructed with storyboards and released online.
"Rain Gods"	N/A	Neil Gaiman (Note: Erroneously credited to Steven Moffat)	24 September 2013 (home video release)
The Doctor and River Song are trapped and at the mercy of the natives of the planet of the Rain Gods, and are about to be sacrificed to those gods to appease their wrath and sustain their crops. The two of them discuss a plan to escape their predicament, arguing between each other, before a chance thunderstorm intervenes and allows the duo to escape to the TARDIS.
"Clara and the TARDIS"	N/A	Steven Moffat	24 September 2013 (home video release)
Clara walks into the control room and argues with the TARDIS after her bedroom mysteriously disappears. The argument ends with the TARDIS showing Clara a slideshow of the Doctor's previous companions. Giving up, Clara leaves to find her bedroom, not after telling the time machine to "do your worst", only to be stopped by herself from the following night, who still hasn't found it. Her other self begins talking to the console, while a third Clara appears, still exhausted and much more frustrated from looking for her bedroom. One by one, the TARDIS fills the control room with future versions of Clara; none of whom have found their bedroom. The episode ends with Clara watching in amazement as her other-selves yell at the console.
"INFORARIUM"	N/A	Steven Moffat	24 September 2013 (home video release)
While trying to fix a data core breach, an operator in a source of illicit information called "the Inforarium" receives a recorded message of the Doctor. The recorded Doctor tells how he has been trying to erase himself from every database in the universe, for the simple reason that he wants to be left alone. The operator says this is impossible, and recording responds in perfect synchronization. The Doctor explains this by saying the operator is so predictable. The Doctor acknowledges he cannot erase himself, but he has managed to memory-proof all information about him in the same way the Silence do. The operator doesn't believe the Doctor, and the recording ends. The Doctor's plan works, as the operator completely forgets the conversation and returns to the malfunction. The episode ends with the recording of the Doctor reappearing and the entire conversation is replayed, with a likely assumption of forming an infinite loop with the recording.

=== Prequels ===
Prologue videos to selected episodes were released via various online outlets and the Children in Need 2012 appeal.

Title	Directed by	Written by	Original release date
"The Doctor, The Widow and the Wardrobe Prequel"	Marcus Wilson	Steven Moffat	6 December 2011 (online)
The Doctor is seen on a spaceship holding a red button which, when he lets go, will cause the space ship to explode. While holding the button, he has phoned the TARDIS to speak to Amy Pond asking her to rescue him, although he does not have his co-ordinates, Amy cannot fly the TARDIS, and she is not on the TARDIS. The Doctor wishes Amy a Merry Christmas before letting go of the button, and the spaceship explodes.
"Asylum of the Daleks Prequel"	Saul Metzstein	Steven Moffat	2 September 2012 (iTunes, Zune, and Amazon Video)
As the Doctor has tea, a hooded messenger informs him that a woman, Darla von Karlsen, requests his help in freeing her daughter. The messenger provides space-time coordinates to the planet Skaro.
"The Making of The Gunslinger"	Neill Gorton	Toby Whithouse	16 September 2012 (iTunes, Zune, and Amazon Video)
A prologue to "A Town Called Mercy", depicting the actual making and formation of the Gunslinger, from a normal humanoid body. It also has an explanation of the making of the Gunslinger in voice-over by Kahler-Jex.
"The Great Detective"	Marcus Wilson	Steven Moffat	16 November 2012 (BBC One)
A mini episode for Children in Need 2012, Vastra, Jenny and Strax attempt to lure the Doctor out of retirement in this prologue to "The Snowmen".
"Vastra Investigates"	John Hayes	Steven Moffat	17 December 2012 (online); 20 December 2012 (BBC Red Button)
A prologue to "The Snowmen", Vastra, Jenny, and Strax wrap up another case.
"The Bells of Saint John – A Prequel"	John Hayes	Steven Moffat	23 March 2013 (online); 29 March 2013 (BBC Red Button)
Frustrated in his search for Clara, the Doctor talks to a little girl on a playground, who is revealed to be Clara Oswald.
"The Battle of Demon's Run – Two Days Later"	Marcus Wilson	Steven Moffat	25 March 2013 (iTunes, and Amazon Video)"
Set after the events of "A Good Man Goes to War", Madame Vastra and Jenny convince Strax to join them in 1890s London. Serves as a prologue to "The Snowmen"
"She Said, He Said"	Saul Metzstein	Steven Moffat	11 May 2013 (BBC Red Button)
The Doctor and Clara discuss how little they know about each other in a prologue to "The Name of the Doctor".
"Clarence and the Whispermen"	Stephen Woolfenden	Steven Moffat	26 May 2013 (home video release)
A convicted criminal receives information about the Doctor's future from the villainous Whispermen in a prologue to "The Name of the Doctor".

== Casting ==
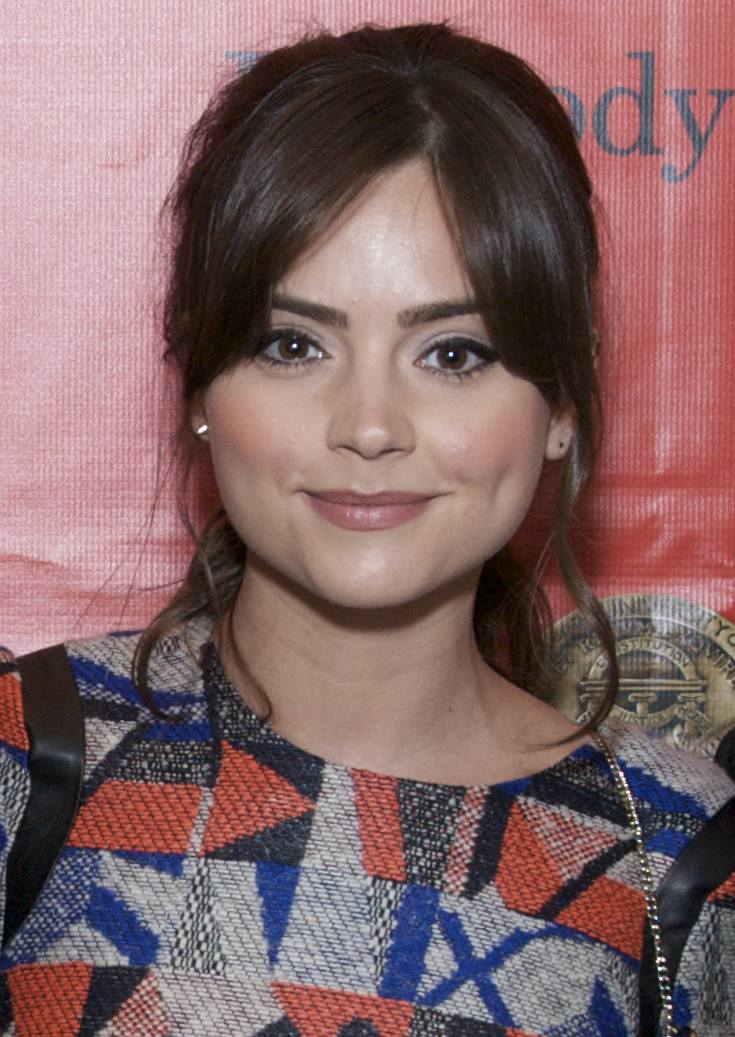
Jenna Coleman plays Clara Oswald, the sixth companion since the show was re-launched.

The seventh series marked Matt Smith's third and final full series as the eleventh incarnation of the Doctor. Karen Gillan and Arthur Darvill, who portray Amy Pond and Rory Williams respectively, departed the programme in the fifth episode. The decision to write the pair out of the series was a mutual decision from Gillan and showrunner Steven Moffat. The actress previously stated that she did not want to make return cameos to the show.

On 21 March 2012, it was announced that Jenna Coleman would replace Gillan and Darvill as the next companion. She auditioned for the role in secrecy, pretending it was for something called Men on Waves, an anagram for "Woman Seven". Moffat chose her for the role because she worked the best alongside Smith and could talk faster than him. He stated that her character will be different from previous companions, though he attempted to keep the details of her character a secret until she debuted in the Christmas special. In "Asylum of the Daleks", Coleman appears as the character Oswin Oswald, a secret which was kept from the public before transmission. Coleman was originally given the role of a Victorian governess named Jasmine, and then for the second audition she was given both the characters of Oswin and Clara. She originally thought that the producers were looking for the right character, but later realised it was part of Moffat's "soft mystery" plan of having multiple iterations of Clara in the events of "The Name of the Doctor".

Guest stars include David Gyasi in episode 1, Rupert Graves, David Bradley, Riann Steele, and the voices of David Mitchell and Robert Webb in episode 2, Ben Browder, Adrian Scarborough, and Garrick Hagon in episode 3, Steven Berkoff, Ruthie Henshall, and Jemma Redgrave in episode 4, Mike McShane in episode 5, Celia Imrie in episode 7, David Warner, Tobias Menzies, James Norton, Josh O'Connor, and Liam Cunningham in episode 8, Dougray Scott and Jessica Raine in episode 9, Ashley Walters in episode 10, Rachael Stirling and her mother Dame Diana Rigg in episode 11, and Warwick Davis and Tamzin Outhwaite in episode 12.

Mark Williams appears in the second and fourth episodes as Rory's father. Alex Kingston returned to the series as her character River Song for Amy and Rory's final episode and the series finale. Richard E. Grant and Tom Ward were cast in the 2012 Christmas special, together with young actor Cameron Strefford playing a younger version of Grant's character. Ian McKellen also appears in the Christmas special, providing the original voice of the Great Intelligence. Grant later returned in the mid-series premiere and the series finale, portraying the Great Intelligence.

== Production ==
=== Development ===
"When you start with who's going to be the one who goes on board the TARDIS, you can't think of the word "companion." You can't think that they know they're the supporting character on a TV show. You have to think that this is somebody who would fly away in that TARDIS, and that the Doctor would want to fly away in the TARDIS with. The Doctor is quite picky. He doesn't like everybody. He's a difficult man to deal with. It's not just anybody that he actually forms a proper friendship with. And what sort of person would run through those blue doors? An awful lot of people would run the other direction, probably including me, to be honest. So, you have to imagine somebody who's ready to say, "Yes!," to running away with a clearly insane man who has a time machine. That is your starting point with that character. What point in their life are they? What decisions have been made that leads them to respond positively to a travel request from a lunatic in a bow tie."

— Steven Moffat

The BBC commissioned the fourteen-episode seventh series on 8 June 2011. "The Doctor, the Widow and the Wardrobe" was executive produced by Steven Moffat, Piers Wenger and Caroline Skinner. Beth Willis left the BBC and stepped down as executive producer after series 6 and Wenger also departed following the Christmas special, leaving Moffat and Skinner as executive producers for series 7. Marcus Wilson remained as series producer, with Denise Paul producing "The Bells of Saint John", "The Rings of Akhaten", "Nightmare in Silver" and "The Name of the Doctor". Production of Doctor Who relocated to the new Roath Lock studios in Cardiff midway through production of the series on 12 March 2012; the first episode to be filmed there was the Christmas special in Block Four, with the debut of Coleman's character; however it was reported that a later episode written by Neil Cross was the first Coleman filmed. Moffat has stated that the introduction of the new companion will "[reboot] the show a little bit" and "make you look at the Doctor differently".

=== Writing ===
Moffat has stated that the seventh series would be the opposite of the arc-driven nature of the sixth, consisting of mainly stand-alone stories. This was inspired by fan reactions to the title of "Let's Kill Hitler" when it was revealed at the end of "A Good Man Goes to War" with no plot details; he told the writers of the seventh series to "slut it up" with "big, huge, mad ideas" and "write it like a movie poster". Toby Whithouse, writer of the Wild West-themed third episode, stated that each episode would have more of a specific genre, and his was developed from a one-line pitch from Moffat. The stand-alone nature meant that there were no two-part episodes or series-long story arcs. According to Dan Martin of The Guardian, Moffat stated that the goal of the series was "compressed storytelling"; Martin remarked that "Asylum of the Daleks" told more than some of the four-parters in the classic series.

=== Design changes ===
The redesigned Doctor Who title card for the first part of series 7 removed the "DW" insignia and featured a different look for each episode.

In keeping with the blockbuster theme, the title sequence for the first part of the series (up to and including "The Snowmen") featured a different look to the titles and logo in the title sequence to reflect the concept of the episode. The Time Vortex in the title sequence was also tinted blue and green. The interior of the TARDIS was redesigned starting with the Christmas special, which also featured a new title sequence that, for the first time since the end of Season 26 in 1989, showed the Doctor's face, together with a new orchestration of the theme tune. Moffat had noticed that the TARDIS' design was getting "progressively whimsical" and resembled more of a "magical place" rather than a machine. The set was designed by series production designer Michael Pickwoad, who stated that the new interior was also supposed to be "darker and moodier" and provide an easier access to the "gallery" of the ship when shooting. The new design allowed the entrance to be more central, and also returned the console to the look of the designs in the classic series.

The Doctor Who title card for the second part of series 7, similar to the logo use in the first part of the series but with different texture and background.

In the Christmas special the Doctor sported a new costume, tying into the purple colour scheme, which Smith described as "a bit Artful Dodger meets the Doctor". Moffat described the new outfit as a "progression" as the Doctor was in "a different phase of his life now" and felt more "grown-up" and fatherlike. In the second half of the series, Moffat intended to show the Doctor not dressing exactly the same way each time, similar to the Third Doctor (Jon Pertwee) and the Fourth Doctor (Tom Baker), who did not wear exactly the same clothes but retained a common "look".

=== Music ===
Murray Gold composed the soundtrack to this series, with orchestration by Ben Foster.

=== Filming ===
The seventh series began shooting on 20 February 2012. Episodes 2 and 3 were the first to enter production, directed by Saul Metzstein. Much of the Wild West episode was filmed in March 2012 in the desert area of Almería, Spain, an area which contains Wild-West style streets that have been used in the making of many Western-set films. Filming the episode in Spain was cheaper than constructing a set in the UK. The fifth episode, Amy and Rory's last, was filmed in Central Park in New York City in April 2012, as well as at Cardiff University and a cemetery in Llanelli. The fourth episode was filmed next, the only episode in the third block of production.

Filming for Pond Life occurred as part of the series's additional photography, following Karen Gillan and Arthur Darvill's final scenes for the episode "The Power of Three". It was filmed over three days, from 6 to 8 June 2012, alongside the prequel to "Asylum of the Daleks"; Amy and Rory's house was filmed on Bute Esplanade.

Doctor Who Magazine reported that the Christmas special would be produced by itself in Block Four. In late May 2012, Coleman was spotted at a manor in the Vale of Glamorgan, filming what was reported to be the Christmas special. However, Neil Cross's episode, reportedly the first Coleman shot, was partially filmed in Margam Country Park, South Wales, around the same time, and it was reported that the manor location was also for that episode, and that Moffat was still writing the Christmas special. "Cold War" and "The Crimson Horror" were filmed in June and July 2012." The Christmas special began filming the week of 6 August. "Journey to the Centre of the TARDIS" finished filming in September 2012. "The Bells of Saint John" was filmed in London from 8–16 October 2012. "The Rings of Akhaten" became the 100th episode produced since the series returned in 2005, although "The Crimson Horror" was the 100th aired. Scenes for "Nightmare in Silver" were filmed in early November 2012, showing a new design for the Cybermen.

Production blocks were arranged as follows:

Block	Episode(s)	Director	Writer(s)	Producer
X	Christmas special: "The Doctor, the Widow and the Wardrobe"	Farren Blackburn	Steven Moffat	Marcus Wilson
1	Episode 2: "Dinosaurs on a Spaceship"	Saul Metzstein	Chris Chibnall	Marcus Wilson
1	Episode 3: "A Town Called Mercy"	Saul Metzstein	Toby Whithouse	Marcus Wilson
2	Episode 1: "Asylum of the Daleks"	Nick Hurran	Steven Moffat	Marcus Wilson
2	Episode 5: "The Angels Take Manhattan"	Nick Hurran	Steven Moffat	Marcus Wilson
3	Episode 4: "The Power of Three"	Douglas Mackinnon	Chris Chibnall	Marcus Wilson
4	Episode 9: "Hide"	Jamie Payne	Neil Cross	Marcus Wilson
4	Episode 8: "Cold War"	Douglas Mackinnon	Mark Gatiss	Marcus Wilson
5	Episode 11: "The Crimson Horror"	Saul Metzstein	Mark Gatiss	Marcus Wilson
5	Christmas special: "The Snowmen"	Saul Metzstein	Steven Moffat	Marcus Wilson
6	Episode 10: "Journey to the Centre of the TARDIS"	Mat King	Stephen Thompson	Marcus Wilson
7	Episode 6: "The Bells of Saint John"	Colm McCarthy	Steven Moffat	Denise Paul & Marcus Wilson
7	Episode 7: "The Rings of Akhaten"	Farren Blackburn	Neil Cross	Denise Paul & Marcus Wilson
8	Episode 12: "Nightmare in Silver"	Stephen Woolfenden	Neil Gaiman	Denise Paul & Marcus Wilson
8	Episode 13: "The Name of the Doctor"	Saul Metzstein	Steven Moffat	Denise Paul & Marcus Wilson

== Release ==
=== Promotion ===
Smith, Gillan, Darvill, Moffat, and Skinner all promoted the series at the official Doctor Who convention in Cardiff in March 2012. At the convention the first trailer for the series premiered. Three promotional images of Smith and Coleman were released on 8 June, 11 June, and 13 June. New footage was shown at the 2012 San Diego Comic-Con on 15 July, consisting of clips from the second and third episodes. The second trailer for the series aired on the BBC on 2 August, as part of the coverage of the London Olympics. The 90-second trailer and a promotional image were first made available online in the morning of 2 August. "Asylum of the Daleks" was screened at BFI Southbank on 14 August, and at the MediaGuardian Edinburgh International Television Festival during 23–25 August. On 25 August it was also screened in New York City. Following the BFI screening, around twenty high-resolution images from the first five episodes were released on the BBC's Doctor Who website. A teaser trailer for "Asylum of the Daleks" was released on 18 August 2012, with a longer version released on 25 August. On 29 August at midnight, the BBC released poster-style artwork for episodes 2–5.

A trailer for the second half of the series first appeared at the end of "The Snowmen". The second was released 16 March 2013. A first picture and the title of "The Bells of Saint John" was released by the BBC on 1 March 2013. "The Bells of Saint John" was first screened to the press on 15 March, though the press was not allowed to release information until 18 March. On 18 March, the BBC released poster-style artwork for episodes 7–10. The prologue and trailer for "The Bells of Saint John" were released on 23 March 2013, and another picture was released on 26 March 2013. On 18 April 2013, the BBC released more poster-style artwork for episodes 11–13. On 19 April 2013, the title and poster for "The Name of the Doctor" were released. The prologue to the finale, "She Said, He Said" was released on 11 May 2013 on BBC Red Button and on-line. Viewers using Red Button were able to access the prologue between 7:40 and midnight every evening, until "The Name of the Doctor" aired on 18 May 2013.

=== Broadcast ===
The Doctor Who official Twitter account announced in March 2012 that it was planned that six episodes would be shown in 2012, including a Christmas Special, to be followed by eight in 2013. In July 2012, Smith stated that it would start in August, but Moffat later confirmed it was September. Part of the reason the show was moved to the start of the year was because Moffat felt the darker nights suited the atmosphere of the programme, as well as the classic series originally airing in the start of the year. He stated that the decision to split the series up originally came from the BBC, but he was open to anything that "shakes [the series] up" and making the audience wait would make it seem like an "event piece".

The first episode was broadcast on 1 September 2012 on BBC One in the United Kingdom, with the fifth episode airing on 29 September 2012. The Christmas episode was broadcast on 25 December 2012 on BBC One in the United Kingdom, and the first episode of the second half of the series was broadcast on 30 March 2013. The series finale, "The Name Of The Doctor", was broadcast on 18 May 2013.

The series premiered on 1 September 2012 on BBC America in the United States, and on Space in Canada. Within minutes of the first episode's UK ending, it was released onto the ABC iview service at 5:10 am on 2 September 2012. It premiered 8 September 2012 on ABC1 in Australia, and on 13 September 2012 in New Zealand on Prime TV.

"The Snowmen" aired on 25 December 2012 on BBC America in the US, and the same date on Space in Canada. It aired the next day on ABC in Australia, and Prime in New Zealand.

The first episode of the second half of the series, "The Bells of Saint John", was broadcast on 30 March 2013 on BBC America in the US, and on Space in Canada, and the following day in Australia on ABC1 and in South Africa on BBC Entertainment. Prime TV began airing the remainder of the series in New Zealand on 11 April 2013.

=== Home media ===
"The Doctor, the Widow and the Wardrobe" was released singly onto DVD and Blu-ray on 12 January 2012, episodes 1–5 (dubbed as 'Series 7: Part 1') followed on 29 October 2012 in Region 2 and 13 November 2012 in Region 1. The second part was released on 27 May 2013 containing the remaining episodes plus the 2012 Christmas special "The Snowmen". The remaining eight episodes plus "The Snowmen" were released onto DVD and Blu-ray on 27 May 2013 in Region 2, while the former was released as two separate publications in Region 1 on 28 May 2013. On 12 May 2013, the box set of Series 7 Part 2 was erroneously dispatched to customers who pre-ordered it through the BBC America online store before the series had been fully aired, prompting a plea from show-runner Steven Moffat to keep the final episode "a secret" until broadcast. A 5-disc box set containing all 13 episodes plus the Christmas specials "The Doctor, the Widow and the Wardrobe" and "The Snowmen" was released on 24 September 2013 in Region 1 and 28 October 2013 in Region 2.

- ^{(D)} indicates a DVD release for a specific date
- ^{(B)} indicates a Blu-ray release
- ^{(D,B)} indicates a simultaneous DVD and Blu-ray release

Series	Story no.	Episode name	Duration	Release date		
Series	Story no.	Episode name	Duration	R2	R4	R1
7	225	Doctor Who: "The Doctor, the Widow and the Wardrobe"	1 × 60 min.	16 January 2012^{(D,B)}	1 March 2012^{(D,B)}	14 February 2012^{(D,B)}
7	226–230	Doctor Who: Series 7, Part 1 "Pond Life" "Asylum of the Daleks" – "The Angels Take Manhattan"	4 × 45 min. 1 × 50 min. 1 × 5 min.	29 October 2012^{(D,B)}	14 November 2012^{(D,B)}	13 November 2012^{(D,B)}
7	231	Doctor Who: "The Snowmen"	1 × 60 min.	—N/a	—N/a	28 May 2013^{(D,B)}
7	232–239	Doctor Who: Series 7, Part 2 "The Snowmen" (Region 2 and 4 only) "The Bells of Saint John" – "The Name of the Doctor"	1 × 60 min. 8 × 45 min.	27 May 2013^{(D,B)}	22 May 2013^{(D,B)}	28 May 2013^{(D,B)}
7	225–239	Doctor Who: The Complete Seventh Series (includes "The Doctor, the Widow and the Wardrobe" and "The Snowmen")	2 × 60 min. 1 × 50 min. 12 × 45 min.	28 October 2013^{(D,B)}	30 October 2013^{(D,B)}	24 September 2013^{(D,B)}
5, 6, 7, 2013 specials	203–241	Doctor Who: The Complete Matt Smith Years	30 × 45 min. 7 × 50 min. 1 × 55 min. 4 × 60 min. 1 × 65 min. 1 × 77 min.	—N/a	—N/a	4 November 2014^{(B)} 2 October 2018^{(D)}

== In print ==
Series	Story no.	Novelisation title	Author	Original publisher	Paperback release date	Audiobook	
Series	Story no.	Novelisation title	Author	Original publisher	Paperback release date	Release date (Note: Unabridged from BBC Audio / AudioGo unless otherwise indicated)	Narrator
7	237	The Crimson Horror	Mark Gatiss	BBC Books (Target collection)	11 March 2021		Dan Starkey; Catrin Stewart

== Reception ==
=== Ratings ===
The series received a strong Appreciation Index, with all episodes aside from "The Doctor, the Widow and the Wardrobe", "The Rings of Akhaten", "Cold War" and "Nightmare in Silver" in the "excellent" category of a score of 85 or more. "Asylum of the Daleks", "The Angels Take Manhattan" and "The Name of The Doctor" reached 89, 88, and 88, respectively, with "Asylum of the Daleks"'s score being higher than any of the last season and "The Name of The Doctor" higher than the series finale of the last season.

No.	Title	Air date	Overnight ratings		Consolidated ratings		Total viewers (millions)	AI	Ref(s)
No.	Title	Air date	Viewers (millions)	Rank	Viewers (millions)	Rank	Total viewers (millions)	AI	Ref(s)
–	"The Doctor, the Widow and the Wardrobe"	25 December 2011	8.90	3	1.87	2	10.77	84	
1	"Asylum of the Daleks"	1 September 2012	6.40	2	1.93	3	8.33	89	
2	"Dinosaurs on a Spaceship"	8 September 2012	5.50	2	2.07	4	7.57	87	
3	"A Town Called Mercy"	15 September 2012	6.60	3	1.82	2	8.42	85	
4	"The Power of Three"	22 September 2012	5.50	2	2.17	5	7.67	87	
5	"The Angels Take Manhattan"	29 September 2012	5.90	1	1.92	5	7.82	88	
–	"The Snowmen"	25 December 2012	7.60	5	2.27	7	9.87	87	
6	"The Bells of Saint John"	30 March 2013	6.18	3	2.26	2	8.44	87	
7	"The Rings of Akhaten"	6 April 2013	5.50	3	1.95	6	7.45	84	
8	"Cold War"	13 April 2013	5.70	3	1.67	5	7.37	84	
9	"Hide"	20 April 2013	5.00	4	1.61	6	6.61	85	
10	"Journey to the Centre of the TARDIS"	27 April 2013	4.90	3	1.6	7	6.50	85	
11	"The Crimson Horror"	4 May 2013	4.61	4	1.86	6	6.47	85	
12	"Nightmare in Silver"	11 May 2013	4.70	4	1.94	9	6.64	84	
13	"The Name of the Doctor"	18 May 2013	5.50	3	1.95	3	7.45	88	

=== Critical reception ===
On review aggregator Rotten Tomatoes, the series holds a 100% approval rating based on 8 critic reviews, and an average score of 8.82/10.

Reviewing the first half, SFX gave it 4/5 stars, describing it as "gloriously gorgeous and indomitably imaginative" with praise to the writing, although it did find "Dinosaurs On A Spaceship" to be "a raggedy underachiever" and found the Daleks' appearance in the opener to be unthreatening. Sherry Lipp of Cinema Lowdown wrote that "The first half of this series was somewhat of a disappointment, with more weak-to-average episodes than quality ones" with particular note to the episode "Dinosaurs on a Spaceship" which she describes as one of her "least favorite episodes of the series".

SFX called the second part of the series "the creakiest run of episodes since 1988" but noted that there was "plenty to enjoy", ending the review with "Thankfully 'The Name of the Doctor' is everything we could have hoped for from an overture to the 50th anniversary special: a wonderful, spectacular-looking, twisty-turny nostalgia-fest. The show's still got it." Patrick Kavanagh-Sproull of Cultfix described the second part as a "return to form" concluding that "Apart from a few slightly faulty episodes, Series Seven was brilliant".

Reviewing the whole series for IGN, Mark Snow rated it 7.9/10 and wrote that the series was "a tumultuous one". He felt that although "the concepts were almost universally strong, cramming an entire movie's worth of ideas into a self-contained 50 minute episode inevitably left plot-threads dangling". However, he thought that it "succeeded where it really counted – with strong character work, sporadically genius story concepts, and some show-altering twists that ensure we're as jazzed as ever for the forthcoming TV event of the semi-century". Peter Canavese of Groucho Reviews rated it 3.5/4, and wrote that "In the penultimate batch of episodes before Doctor Who's jubilee year, executive producer Steven Moffat continues to marvel with his ability to keep the time-and-space-travelling Doctor in ever-so-complicated trouble." He also praised the cast who were "very much on top of their collective game", and "The Impossible Girl" story arc. In his review of the seventh series' home media release, Mark Redfern of Under the Radar commented that the seventh series "features its share of hits and misses", but "mostly finds Doctor Who still in fine form". He listed the episodes "The Bells of Saint John" and "Nightmare in Silver" as "underwhelming", but praised the episodes "Asylum of the Daleks" and "The Angels Take Manhattan" for the introduction of Clara and departure of the Ponds respectively, as well as "Hide", "The Journey to the Center of the TARDIS" and "The Crimson Horror".

=== Awards and nominations ===
Year	Award	Category	Nominee(s)	Result	Ref(s)
2013	BAFTA Craft Awards	Visual Effects and Graphic Design	The Mill	Nominated	
2013	BAFTA Craft Awards	Original Television Music	Murray Gold for his score in "Asylum of the Daleks"	Nominated	
2013	BAFTA Cymru	Sound Category	The Sound Team	Nominated	
2013	BAFTA Cymru	Editing Category for his work on "The Snowmen"	William Oswald	Nominated	
2013	Hugo Awards	Hugo Award for Best Dramatic Presentation (Short Form)	"Asylum of the Daleks"	Nominated	
2013	Hugo Awards	Hugo Award for Best Dramatic Presentation (Short Form)	"The Angels Take Manhattan"	Nominated	
2013	Hugo Awards	Hugo Award for Best Dramatic Presentation (Short Form)	"The Snowmen"	Nominated	
2013	Peabody Award	Institutional Award	Doctor Who	Won	
2013	TV Choice Awards	Best Drama	Doctor Who	Nominated	
2013	TV Choice Awards	Best Actor	Matt Smith	Nominated	
2013	TV Choice Awards	Best Actress	Jenna Coleman	Nominated	
2013	TV Choice Awards	Best Drama	Doctor Who	Won	
2013	TV Choice Awards	Outstanding Contribution Award	Doctor Who	Won	
2014	National Television Awards	Best Drama	Doctor Who	Won	
2014	National Television Awards	Best Drama Performance	Matt Smith	Won	

== Soundtrack ==
Selected pieces of score from this series (from "Asylum of the Daleks" to "The Name of the Doctor", excluding "The Snowmen"), as composed by Murray Gold, were released on 9 September 2013 by Silva Screen Records. The music from "The Doctor, the Widow and the Wardrobe" and "The Snowmen" was released on a separate soundtrack on 21 October 2013.

=== Series 7 ===
Doctor Who: Series 7

Soundtrack album by Murray Gold, Ben Foster and the BBC National Orchestra of Wales
- Released: 9 September 2013 (UK & Australia); 5 November 2013 (USA)
- Recorded: 2011–2013
- Genre: Soundtrack
- Length: 147:15
- Label: Silva Screen
- Producer: Murray Gold

Doctor Who soundtrack chronology
The Krotons (2013)	Series 7 (2013)	The Snowmen / The Doctor, the Widow and the Wardrobe (2013)

Disc 1
No.	Title	Episode	Length
1.	"They Are Everywhere"	"Asylum of the Daleks"	3:12
2.	"Save Us"	"Asylum of the Daleks"	0:51
3.	"Dalek Parliament"	"Asylum of the Daleks"	2:02
4.	"Oswin Oswald"	"Asylum of the Daleks"	1:03
5.	"Towards the Asylum"	"Asylum of the Daleks"	2:25
6.	"A Probe in the Snow"	"Asylum of the Daleks"	1:55
7.	"Amy and Rory Together"	"Asylum of the Daleks"	1:50
8.	"The Terrible Truth"	"Asylum of the Daleks"	3:25
9.	"Dinosaurs on a Spaceship" / "Pterodactyls"	"Dinosaurs on a Spaceship"	1:44
10.	"Brian"	"Dinosaurs on a Spaceship"	1:20
11.	"Take a Ride on Tricey"	"Dinosaurs on a Spaceship"	2:02
12.	"Make Peace"	"A Town Called Mercy"	0:52
13.	"Welcome to Mercy"	"A Town Called Mercy"	1:45
14.	"Out West"	"A Town Called Mercy"	3:35
15.	"Gunslingers"	"A Town Called Mercy"	1:07
16.	"The Salvation of Kahler-Jex"	"A Town Called Mercy"	2:20
17.	"Our Little Town's Protector"	"A Town Called Mercy"	1:39
18.	"Cubes"	"The Power of Three"	0:44
19.	"While We Waited"	"The Power of Three"	2:12
20.	"Brian's Log"	"The Power of Three"	0:55
21.	"New York New York"	"The Angels Take Manhattan"	1:50
22.	"I Am You"	"The Angels Take Manhattan"	3:25
23.	"Melody Malone"	"The Angels Take Manhattan"	1:50
24.	"Little Angels"	"The Angels Take Manhattan"	2:37
25.	"My Husband's Home"	"The Angels Take Manhattan"	2:43
26.	"Hide the Damage"	"The Angels Take Manhattan"	2:19
27.	"Almost the End"	"The Angels Take Manhattan"	1:20
28.	"Together or Not at All - The Song of Amy And Rory"	"The Angels Take Manhattan"	3:16
29.	"Goodbye Pond"	"The Angels Take Manhattan"	2:50
30.	"Cumbria 1207"	"The Bells of Saint John"	1:35
31.	"Monking About"	"The Bells of Saint John"	0:44
32.	"Spoonheads"	"The Bells of Saint John"	2:09
33.	"Clara?"	"The Bells of Saint John"	3:24
34.	"A Turbulent Flight"	"The Bells of Saint John"	2:13
35.	"Bah Bah Biker"	"The Bells of Saint John"	0:42
36.	"Up the Shard"	"The Bells of Saint John"	3:04
37.	"I Might Change My Mind"	"The Bells of Saint John"	2:45
Total length:			75:44

Disc 2
No.	Title	Episode	Length
1.	"The Leaf"	"The Rings of Akhaten"	2:56
2.	"Something Awesome"	"The Rings of Akhaten"	1:24
3.	"Market Day"	"The Rings of Akhaten"	1:34
4.	"Merry Gejelh"	"The Rings of Akhaten"	2:35
5.	"God of Akhaten"	"The Rings of Akhaten"	3:45
6.	"The Speeder"	"The Rings of Akhaten"	0:53
7.	"Never Wake"	"The Rings of Akhaten"	1:01
8.	"The Long Song"	"The Rings of Akhaten"	3:38
9.	"Infinite Potential"	"The Rings of Akhaten"	2:06
10.	"Always You, Never a Replacement"	"The Rings of Akhaten"	1:58
11.	"Cold War"	"Cold War"	3:59
12.	"Skaldak"	"Cold War"	2:44
13.	"I Am a Ghost"	"Hide"	1:50
14.	"A Machine That Makes Machines"	"Journey to the Centre of the TARDIS"	3:34
15.	"Crimson Horror"	"The Crimson Horror"	1:05
16.	"Sweetville"	"The Crimson Horror"	1:18
17.	"Thomas Thomas"	"The Crimson Horror"	1:20
18.	"Hedgewick's World"	"Nightmare in Silver"	1:37
19.	"Tiberian Spiral Galaxy"	"Nightmare in Silver"	0:53
20.	"Upgrade in Progress"	"Nightmare in Silver"	0:39
21.	"The Dream of Cyberia"	"Nightmare in Silver"	1:09
22.	"What a Brain"	"Nightmare in Silver"	0:54
23.	"Can't Win"	"Nightmare in Silver"	0:33
24.	"Your Orders Come from Me"	"Nightmare in Silver"	0:47
25.	"Other Good News"	"Nightmare in Silver"	0:40
26.	"The Impossible Girl"	"Nightmare in Silver"	2:33
27.	"Cyber Army"	"Nightmare in Silver"	0:53
28.	"The Emperor's Wife"	"Nightmare in Silver"	3:10
29.	"Some Wednesday"	"Nightmare in Silver"	0:49
30.	"To Save the Doctor"	"The Name of the Doctor"	1:28
31.	"A Letter to Clara"	"The Name of the Doctor"	1:22
32.	"What Is His Name?"	"The Name of the Doctor"	1:59
33.	"A Secret He Will Take to His Grave"	"The Name of the Doctor"	2:41
34.	"Trenzalore"	"The Name of the Doctor"	2:22
35.	"I Am Information"	"The Name of the Doctor"	1:27
36.	"Pain Everlasting"	"The Name of the Doctor"	2:22
37.	"Remember Me"	"The Name of the Doctor"	3:04
Total length:			69:02

iTunes store bonus tracks
No.	Title	Episode	Length
38.	"Glasgow"	"The Name of the Doctor"	0:58
39.	"Whisper Men"	"The Name of the Doctor"	1:31
Total length:			2:29

=== Christmas specials ===
Doctor Who: The Snowmen / The Doctor, the Widow and the Wardrobe

Soundtrack album by Murray Gold, Ben Foster and the BBC National Orchestra of Wales
- Released: 21 October 2013
- Recorded: 2011–2012
- Genre: Soundtrack
- Length: 66:47
- Label: Silva Screen Records
- Producer: Murray Gold

Doctor Who soundtrack chronology
Series 7 (2013)	''Doctor Who: The Snowmen / The Doctor, the Widow and the Wardrobe'' (2013)	The 50th Anniversary Collection (2013)

Alternate cover

No.	Title	Episode	Length
1.	"Geronimo"	"The Doctor, the Widow and the Wardrobe"	1:52
2.	"Dressed in a Hurry"	"The Doctor, the Widow and the Wardrobe"	1:39
3.	"Bumps"	"The Doctor, the Widow and the Wardrobe"	1:27
4.	"Ditched at Sea"	"The Doctor, the Widow and the Wardrobe"	0:56
5.	"Madge's Theme"	"The Doctor, the Widow and the Wardrobe"	1:33
6.	"Armchair Waltz"	"The Doctor, the Widow and the Wardrobe"	0:42
7.	"I Know"	"The Doctor, the Widow and the Wardrobe"	1:29
8.	"Quite a Tree"	"The Doctor, the Widow and the Wardrobe"	1:08
9.	"Into the Present"	"The Doctor, the Widow and the Wardrobe"	2:21
10.	"Baubles"	"The Doctor, the Widow and the Wardrobe"	2:43
11.	"The King"	"The Doctor, the Widow and the Wardrobe"	1:42
12.	"The Queen"	"The Doctor, the Widow and the Wardrobe"	2:08
13.	"Interrogation"	"The Doctor, the Widow and the Wardrobe"	2:15
14.	"Lifeboat"	"The Doctor, the Widow and the Wardrobe"	1:13
15.	"You're Fired"	"The Doctor, the Widow and the Wardrobe"	2:32
16.	"Flying Home for Christmas"	"The Doctor, the Widow and the Wardrobe"	4:06
17.	"Safe Landing"	"The Doctor, the Widow and the Wardrobe"	1:27
18.	"Never Alone at Christmas"	"The Doctor, the Widow and the Wardrobe"	1:25
19.	"Friendship"	"The Doctor, the Widow and the Wardrobe"	2:24
20.	"A Voice in the Snow"	"The Snowmen"	2:51
21.	"What's Wrong with Silly"	"The Snowmen"	2:36
22.	"Psychotic Potato Dwarf"	"The Snowmen"	1:31
23.	"Remember the Worm"	"The Snowmen"	1:25
24.	"Clara Who?"	"The Snowmen"	1:28
25.	"Clara in the TARDIS"	"The Snowmen"	2:53
26.	"Governess Clara"	"The Snowmen"	1:34
27.	"Hello Mates"	"The Snowmen"	2:38
28.	"One Word"	"The Snowmen"	3:26
29.	"Sherlock Who?"	"The Snowmen"	1:58
30.	"Antifreeze"	"The Snowmen"	3:02
31.	"Clara Lives"	"The Snowmen"	1:35
32.	"Whose Enigma"	"The Snowmen"	4:48
Total length:			66:47
