= Saul Metzstein =

Scottish film director (born 1970)

Saul Metzstein (born 30 December 1970) is a Scottish film director. He won the Emmy for Outstanding Directing For A Drama Series 2026 for the episode "Scars" in season 5 of Slow Horses.. Other awards include the Scottish BAFTA for Best Drama-fiction 2023 for Slow Horses season 3, and the British Academy Scotland New Talent Award for best director in 2002 for Late Night Shopping.

Metzstein is the son of Isi Metzstein, the renowned modernist architect, and Danielle Kahn. He was raised in Glasgow and studied architecture at Robinson College, Cambridge before taking minor production roles on Danny Boyle's Shallow Grave and Trainspotting and Gillies MacKinnon's Small Faces. He came to prominence with the 2001 feature Late Night Shopping. He subsequently directed documentaries on James Stewart and Gillespie, Kidd & Coia and an episode of Upstairs Downstairs, as well as five episodes of the seventh series of Doctor Who.

== Selected films/TV ==
Year	Title	Notes
2024/25	Slow Horses	Director for the fifth season (six episodes)
2023	Slow Horses	Director for the third season (six episodes)
2019/20	Brassic	Director
2017/19	Living the Dream	Director: "Adults Only","Gators for Cougars","True Love Waits","Steak Out","Visa Tambien","The British Method"
2017	The Snowman	Second Unit Director
2015	Suffragette	Second Unit Director
2015	You, Me and the Apocalypse	Director: "32 Days to Go","26 Days to Go","23 Days to Go","24 Hours to Go","The End of the World"
2014	Ripper Street	Director: "Live Free, Live True","The Peace of Edmund Reid"
2014	Black Sea	Second Unit Director
2014	Our Zoo	Director
2013/14	The Musketeers	Director: "Commodities","The Homecoming"
2012/13	Doctor Who	Director: "Dinosaurs on a Spaceship", "A Town Called Mercy", "The Snowmen", "The Crimson Horror", "The Name of the Doctor"
2012	Dredd	Second Unit Director
2009	Micro Men	starring Alexander Armstrong and Martin Freeman
2005	Guy X	starring Jason Biggs and Natascha McElhone
2001	Late Night Shopping	
1996	Trainspotting	Location Assistant
