= Cold War (Doctor Who) =

234 – "Cold War"
- Doctor Who episode
- Promotional poster

Cast
- Doctor: Matt Smith – Eleventh Doctor
- Companion: Jenna-Louise Coleman – Clara Oswald
- Others: Liam Cunningham – Captain Zhukov; David Warner – Professor Grisenko; Tobias Menzies – Lieutenant Stepashin; Josh O'Connor – Piotr; James Norton – Onegin; Charlie Anson – Belevich; Spencer Wilding – Skaldak; Nicholas Briggs – Voice of Skaldak

Production
- Directed by: Douglas Mackinnon
- Written by: Mark Gatiss
- Produced by: Marcus Wilson
- Executive producers: Steven Moffat; Caroline Skinner
- Music by: Murray Gold
- Series: Series 7
- Running time: 41 minutes
- First broadcast: 13 April 2013

Chronology
← Preceded by "The Rings of Akhaten"	Followed by → "Hide"

"Cold War" is the eighth episode of the seventh series of the British science fiction television series Doctor Who. It first aired on BBC One on 13 April 2013, and was written by Mark Gatiss and directed by Douglas Mackinnon.

In the episode, alien time traveller the Doctor (Matt Smith) and his companion Clara Oswald (Jenna-Louise Coleman) land on a Soviet submarine in 1983 during the Cold War, where the Ice Warrior Grand Marshal Skaldak breaks loose and plots revenge against humanity.

"Cold War" reintroduces the Ice Warriors, who were last seen in the Third Doctor serial The Monster of Peladon (1974). Bringing back the monsters was Gatiss' idea, and he convinced executive producer Steven Moffat by coming up with new things to do with them. The Ice Warriors' costume was improved but not significantly redesigned, as the production team felt they were not well known enough. The episode was filmed in June 2012 on a submarine set, as the story is a closed "base-under-siege". "Cold War" was watched by 7.37 million viewers and received generally positive reviews from critics.

== Plot ==
A Soviet submarine is sailing near the North Pole in 1983 during the Cold War. In the submarine's cargo hold a sailor prematurely begins to defrost a block of ice that Professor Grisenko believes contains a frozen mammoth, and is attacked by an Ice Warrior.

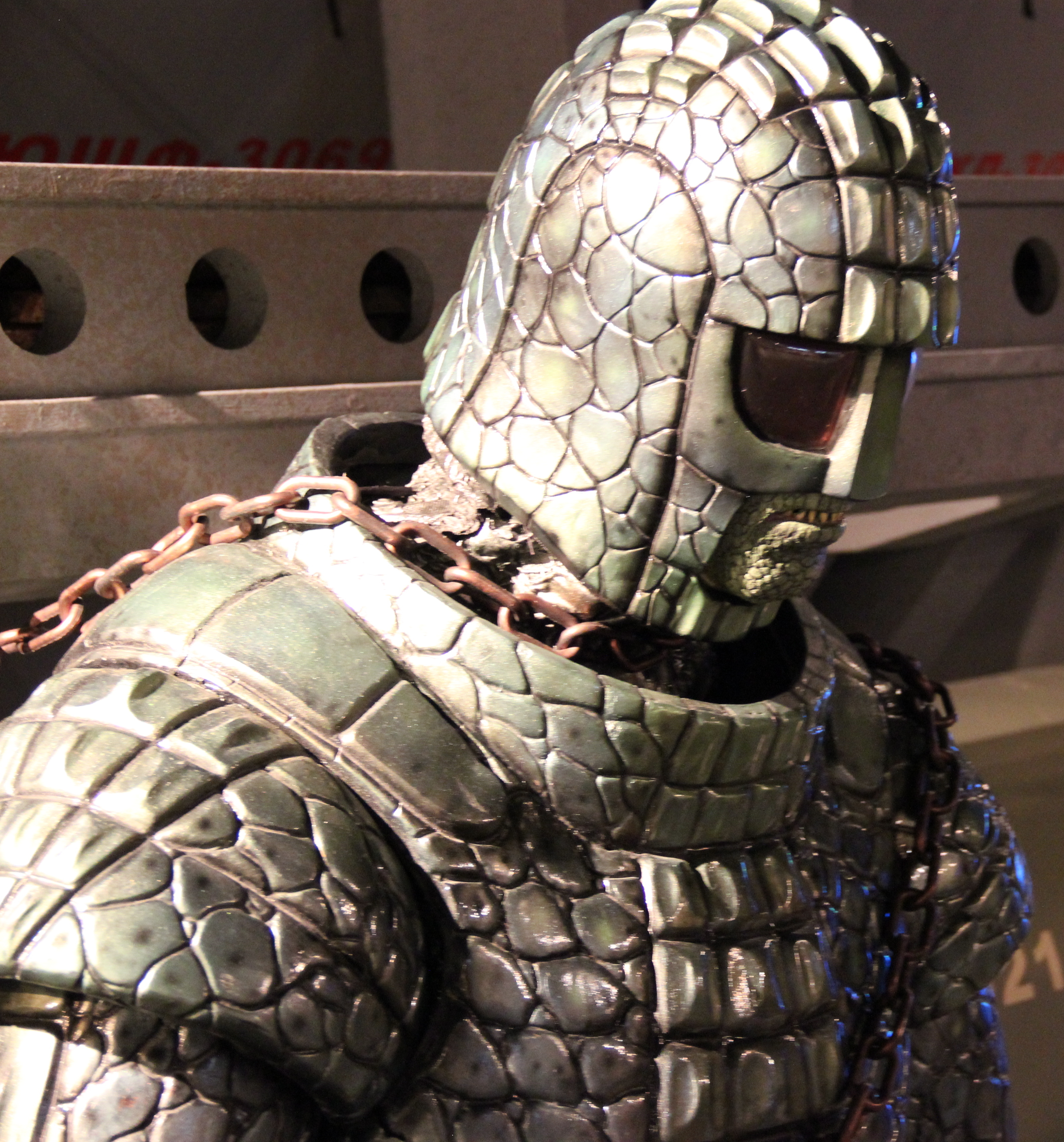
Skaldak model at the Doctor Who Experience

The submarine begins sinking as the Ice Warrior runs amok. The TARDIS materialises inside the submarine and the Eleventh Doctor and Clara tumble out. The Doctor convinces Captain Zhukov to maneuver the submarine to the side, landing it safely on a ridge and preventing it from imploding. During this the TARDIS dematerialises by itself. The Doctor encourages the crew to be peaceful to the escaped Ice Warrior, Grand Marshal Skaldak, but the ship's executive officer Stepashin knocks out Skaldak. Knowing that Skaldak will desire vengeance for being attacked, the Doctor and the crew chain him.

Clara volunteers to speak to Skaldak to try and calm him, relaying the Doctor's words to him, though he knows that the Doctor is listening. The Doctor informs Skaldak he was encased in the ice for 5000 years. Skaldak laments the loss of his daughter and his people; however, the Doctor tries to comfort him with the knowledge that the Ice Warriors still live, just not on Earth or Mars. Skaldak does not believe him and stops broadcasting his distress call to the other Ice Warriors. The Doctor surmises that, thinking himself to be the last of his kind, Skaldak has nothing left to lose. He grabs and kills three members of the crew, including Stepashin.

Having learnt of the ongoing Cold War and the doctrine of mutually assured destruction from Stepashin, Skaldak plans to use the submarine's nuclear missiles to provoke a global thermonuclear war and destroy humanity as revenge for the humans attacking him – under the Martian code humanity as a whole has declared war on the Ice Warrior race by assaulting him. Reaching the bridge, he is able to connect himself to the submarine's missile guidance systems and activate the missiles. The Doctor and Clara are attempting to persuade him to show mercy when the submarine is rocked by a tractor beam from above: the Ice Warriors heard Skaldak's distress call and haul the submarine to the surface. Skaldak is beamed aboard the Ice Warriors' spaceship and deactivates the missiles remotely. The Doctor discovers the TARDIS has relocated to the South Pole.

== Production ==
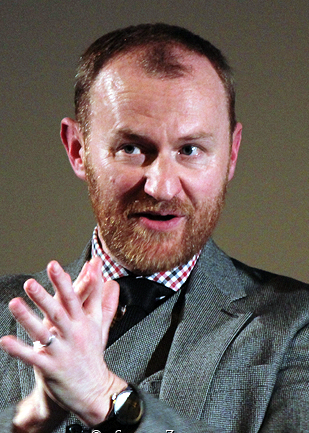
Writer Mark Gatiss had been lobbying to bring back the Ice Warriors, and came up with new ideas which finally sold the episode.

The Ice Warriors were a well-known villain of the original Doctor Who series. They appeared alongside the Second Doctor (Patrick Troughton) in The Ice Warriors (1967) and The Seeds of Death (1969) and returned in the Third Doctor (Jon Pertwee) stories The Curse of Peladon (1972) and The Monster of Peladon (1974). Showrunner Steven Moffat had originally been hesitant to bring back the Ice Warriors, worrying that they were seen as "the default condition for what people thought of as rubbish Doctor Who monsters — things that moved very, very slowly and spoke in a way that meant you couldn't hear a word they said." Writer Mark Gatiss, however, was a fan of the Ice Warriors' stories and had been campaigning to bring them back. In a phone conversation with Moffat that was originally supposed to be about their show Sherlock, Gatiss pitched new and "very clever ideas" of what to do with the Ice Warriors, and Moffat agreed. What sold Moffat were the submarine setting and seeing what the Ice Warriors looked like underneath their suits. Gatiss felt that the Ice Warriors had a lot of gaps in their timeline and had not been featured in a while, which allowed a lot of room to explore them.

The submarine was Gatiss's idea; he felt that Doctor Who called out to be set on a submarine. Executive producer Caroline Skinner described the story as "Letting a huge Ice Warrior loose at the heart of a classic Hunt For Red October style submarine movie." Gatiss chose the time period because he was "kind of obsessed" with the Cold War, and felt that there were several times in the 1980s where the danger was close. Gatiss also described "Cold War" as a "love-letter" to the base-under-siege stories that were common during Troughton's time; the episode even contains a reference to Troughton's The Krotons, which was the last time the TARDIS's HADS had been mentioned.

The read-through for "Cold War" took place on 6 June 2012, with filming beginning on 13 June. For the submarine setting, the cast would be sprayed in-between every take. The scenes in which the characters are drenched in water were achieved by constantly pouring "gallons and gallons of water" on the cast. Actor Jenna-Louise Coleman found the experience fun, while actor Matt Smith said that it made acting easier. Coleman said, "The whole make-up process was reversed as they would damp us down in the morning and rub my mascara off!" For the shots of the submarine in the ocean, a model was used. It was suspended upside-down with "shredded feathers" blown at it to give the effect of being under the sea. It was the first story in Matt Smith's era to use model work, with Mike Tucker and his team being specifically asked back to make the sub.

Unlike some other returning monsters, the Ice Warriors were not heavily redesigned. Gatiss insisted upon keeping the fundamentals of the original and Moffat explained that the original design was not well known enough to put a new spin on it, and so Skaldak's shell is just a "super-version of the original". Of the original design, Millennium FX's Neill Gorton said, "My problem with the old ones is they had Lego hands and weird, spindly arms but a bulky body and these strange saddlebag hips, almost feminine. They had fur sticking out everywhere. So all of that together didn't suggest 'ice warriors.' They should be much beefier and stronger. We gave it more of a bodybuilder physique, changed the hands and styled the body to make it look more like armour-plating, even though it's reptilian." The costume was made of flexible urethane rubber instead of the fibreglass like the original, as it would damage less easily and be more comfortable to wear. The costume was made specially to fit Spencer Wilding. Though only some of Skaldak's real appearance was shown on-screen, Gorton stated that they created a full animatronic body.

== Broadcast and reception ==
"Cold War" was first broadcast in the United Kingdom on BBC One on 13 April 2013. Overnight ratings showed that 5.73 million viewers watched the episode live, a 28.8% audience share. When timeshifted viewers were taken into account, the figure rose to 7.37 million viewers, the fifth most-watched programme of the week on BBC One. In addition, "Cold War" received 1.65 million requests on the online BBC iPlayer during April, the fourth most-watched programme on the service for the month. The episode also received an Appreciation Index of 84.

=== Critical reception ===
Skaldak reveals his true appearance. A first for the series, the revelation was crucial to the writing of the episode, and received positive reception.

The episode received generally positive reviews. Dan Martin of The Guardian wrote that "Cold War" was "easily the best of this new series so far, and Mark Gatiss's finest contribution yet." He praised the reinvention of the Ice Warrior and felt that the elements came together to form an episode that was "tense, tightly wound, claustrophobic but also full of heart." Zap2it's Geoff Berkshire said that "Cold War" was better than Gatiss' previous episodes "The Idiot's Lantern" and "Victory of the Daleks". He praised the guest cast, but wished "their characters had a bit more meat to them." Independent reviewer Neela Debnath described the story as "slick and intelligent" with "cinematic aesthetics and tone."

Patrick Mulkern of Radio Times found an inconsistency with the TARDIS translation matrix, but overall was positive towards the acting, visual aspects, and story. Daily Telegraph reviewer Gavin Fuller gave the episode four out of five stars, describing it as "finely crafted" and "thrilling." He praised the setting and the dialogue, but felt that the Soviet characters were "perilously close to being ciphers." Digital Spy's Morgan Jeffery awarded the episode five out of five stars, saying that it was "fresh and exciting" but also had a "wonderfully old-school tone." He wrote that it had "one of the best guest casts to have graced Doctor Who since the show returned in 2005" and also praised the reintroduction of the Ice Warriors and the production values. Alasdair Wilkins of The A.V. Club gave "Cold War" a grade of A, highlighting the tense atmosphere, the "bold new direction" taken with the Ice Warriors, the guest performances, and Clara's importance.

Russell Lewin of SFX gave "Cold War" four out of five stars, praising the set and direction as well as the Ice Warrior. On the other hand, Lewin noted that, as a base-under-siege story, it did not play with the narrative form or "go anywhere we couldn't have predicted," with the exception of the Ice Warrior breaking out of its suit. IGN's Mark Snow gave the episode a rating of 8.3 out of 10. Snow praised the reintroduction of the Ice Warriors and called Skaldak "the show's most memorable villain in a while, thanks to his stern, occasionally psychopathic approach to problem solving, and an environment that helped make the bulky, heavy creature design imposing rather than laughably naff." However, he felt that some of Skaldak's effects were "laughably rubbery" and that his motivations were "psychotically random." Tor.com reviewer Emmet Asher-Perrin was more critical of the episode, pointing out that little happened. She called the pacing "sloppy" and found Skaldak to not be an interesting foe.

In Doctor Who Magazine issue 460, Graham Kibble-White gave it a mixed review. He complimented the fact that "the action kicks off early – very early – and then doesn't let up", and said the Ice Warrior redesign was "the best reinvention so far of an old Doctor Who foe", although he admitted he thought it was "a shame to lose the tufts of hair around the joints", saying they gave the Ice Warriors "a pleasing organic feel upon the shell." He complained about the reference to the Ice Warriors' code of honour, claiming it to have always been "damnably dull." Additionally, he disliked the revelation of Skaldak's true form, claiming it to look like "a not especially memorable CGI tortoise" and saying the BBC seems to have forgotten that "monsters are diminished when they're brought into the light", as well as worrying that it may have been "breaking a taboo for the show".
