= Hide (Doctor Who) =

235 – "Hide"
- Doctor Who episode
- Promotional poster

Cast
- Doctor: Matt Smith – Eleventh Doctor
- Companion: Jenna-Louise Coleman – Clara Oswald
- Others: Dougray Scott – Professor Alec Palmer; Jessica Raine – Emma Grayling; Kemi-Bo Jacobs – Hila; Aidan Cook – The Crooked Man

Production
- Directed by: Jamie Payne
- Written by: Neil Cross
- Produced by: Marcus Wilson
- Executive producers: Steven Moffat; Caroline Skinner
- Music by: Murray Gold
- Series: Series 7
- Running time: 45 minutes
- First broadcast: 20 April 2013

Chronology
← Preceded by "Cold War"	Followed by → "Journey to the Centre of the TARDIS"

"Hide" is the ninth episode of the seventh series of the British science fiction television series Doctor Who, first broadcast on BBC One on 20 April 2013. It was written by Neil Cross and directed by Jamie Payne.

In the episode, alien time traveller the Doctor (Matt Smith) and his companion Clara Oswald (Jenna-Louise Coleman) visit a mansion in 1974 owned by Professor Alec Palmer (Dougray Scott), which appears to be haunted. Palmer's assistant, Emma Grayling (Jessica Raine), is an empath who is able to connect to the ghost. The Doctor discovers that the ghost is really a time traveller from the future (Kemi-Bo Jacobs) who is trapped in a pocket universe, and he travels there to rescue her. There he discovers a bizarre "Crooked Man" (Aidan Cook), who also seeks to escape the pocket universe and be reunited with its mate in the mansion.

"Hide" was the first contribution to Doctor Who of writer Neil Cross, who was a fan of the show but had never had the time to write an episode. Cross wanted to write a scary episode and was inspired by Nigel Kneale's works The Quatermass Experiment and The Stone Tape. The storyline of "Hide" was kept to a restricted setting and characters, although it was expanded thematically to flesh out the monster with a love story that paralleled that of Professor Palmer and Emma. The first episode to be filmed for the second half of the series — and therefore Coleman's first as Clara — "Hide" began filming in late May 2012 at Margam Country Park, Gethin Forest, and a National Trust property at Tyntesfield. The episode was watched by 6.61 million viewers in the UK and received generally positive reviews from critics.

== Plot ==
=== Synopsis ===
In November 1974, Professor Alec Palmer and his assistant Emma Grayling collect photographic evidence of a ghost in Caliburn House. Professor Palmer is using Emma's strong psychic powers to create a connection that appears to summon the ghost. They are surprised by the arrival of the Eleventh Doctor and Clara, who claim to be from military intelligence. The Doctor shows interest in the investigation and Clara points out that the ghost appears in the same position within each photograph.

The Doctor takes Clara in the TARDIS to examine their specific location at various points during Earth's history and repeatedly takes photographs of the same area. From his pictures the Doctor comes to the conclusion that the "Caliburn Ghast" is actually a pioneer time traveller named Hila Tacorian. Hila was trapped in a pocket universe where time moves more slowly. The Doctor prepares a device to stimulate Emma's psychic abilities to open a gateway to this pocket universe. Once opened, the Doctor will travel across and rescue Hila with a harness anchored in the normal world.

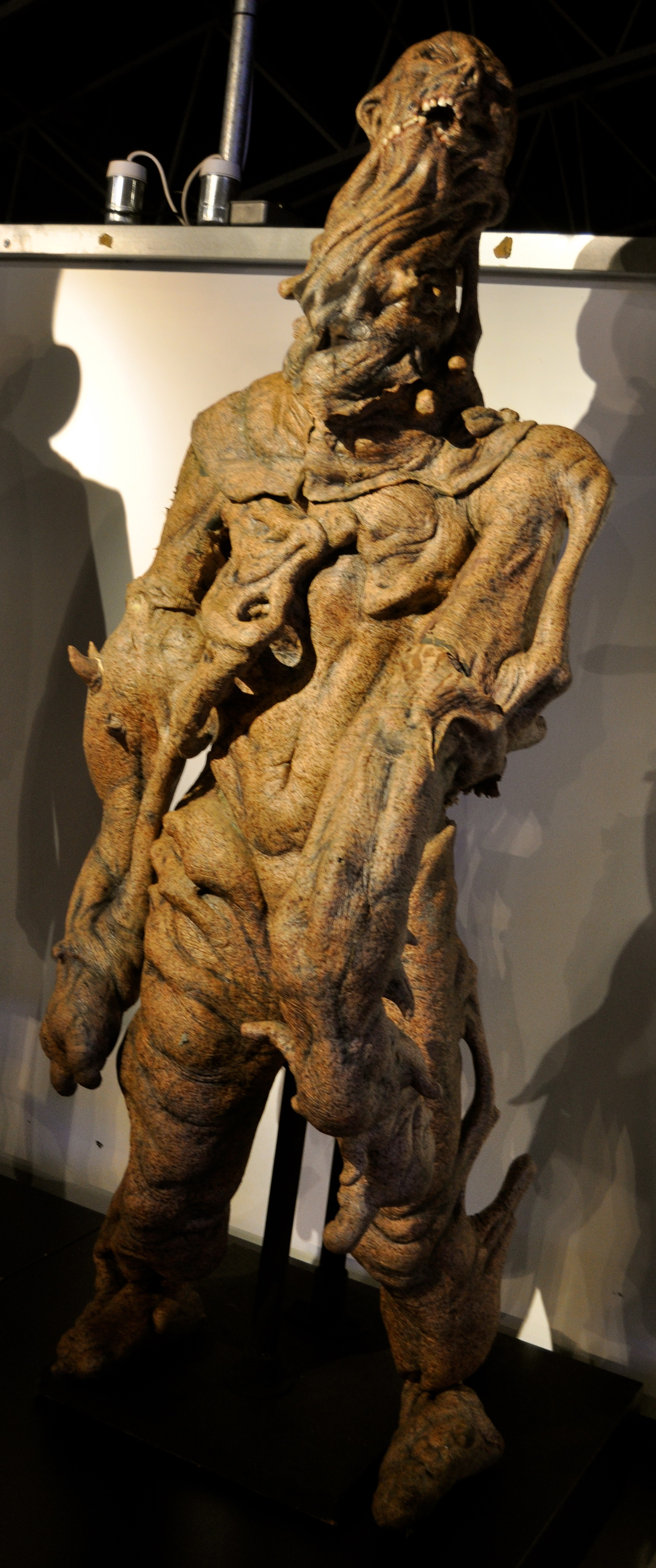
The creature from the episode appearing at the Doctor Who Experience.

The Doctor finds Hila in the pocket universe, and the two are followed and chased by a creature in the forest. Hila returns to Caliburn House, but the gateway closes before the Doctor can return. Clara pleads with the TARDIS via its holographic voice interface to help her save the Doctor, and after initially refusing the TARDIS finally opens up and allows Clara in. As Emma reopens the gateway again with Palmer's encouragement, the TARDIS briefly flies into the pocket universe and moves close to the ground, allowing the Doctor to jump and hang on before the creature can grab him.

Before leaving the next morning, the Doctor stops to ask Emma if she could sense anything unusual about Clara, but Emma reveals that Clara seems normal to her. The Doctor concludes that Hila is a direct descendant of Emma and Palmer. He reasons that their relation resulted in a blood connection that helped Emma open the gateway to rescue Hila. The Doctor suddenly realises that there is another creature within Caliburn House, and the creature chasing the Doctor and Hila in the pocket universe is its mate which was trying to reunite with the creature. The Doctor asks Emma for a favour and they use Emma and the TARDIS to retrieve the other creature from the pocket universe and reunite them.

=== Continuity ===
In the episode, the Doctor uses a blue crystal from Metebelis III. Metebelis III has featured before when the Third Doctor (Jon Pertwee) took a blue crystal from the planet in The Green Death (1973) and returned it in Planet of the Spiders (1974), although it was pronounced differently. The Doctor mentions the Eye of Harmony, which was introduced in The Deadly Assassin (1976). The Doctor puts on the orange spacesuit he wore originally in "The Impossible Planet" / "The Satan Pit" (2006) and wore on a number of occasions up to "The Waters of Mars" (2009) when taking the photos. Early on the episode, when speaking to Grayling, Clara describes the possible relationship between Palmer and Grayling as "sticking out [...] like a big chin"; this references the episode Asylum of the Daleks, in which the previous form of her character, Oswin Oswald, made repeated assertions of the Doctor's chin.

== Production ==
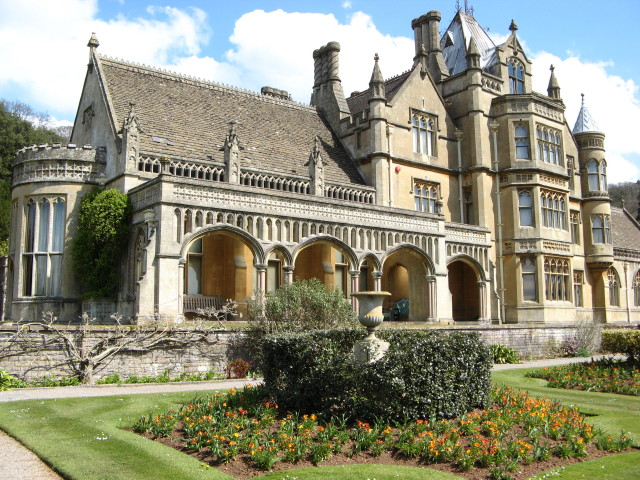
Tyntesfield House, which was used as a filming location of the mansion.

Writer Neil Cross was a Doctor Who fan, but had never had the time to write an episode. Executive producer Caroline Skinner, who was new with the seventh series, knew him and offered to work his schedule around writing an episode; he was willing to do it. Executive producer and lead writer Steven Moffat was pleased to have Cross join, as he was a showrunner in his own right with Luther. Cross also wrote the seventh episode of the series, "The Rings of Akhaten", which he was invited to do after the producers enjoyed "Hide". The script process of "Hide" involved no face-to-face meeting, as Cross lives in New Zealand. However, he flew in with his family to watch the filming.

Cross wanted to write "a really old-fashioned scary episode of Doctor Who" targeted especially at children nine to twelve, which was how he remembered Doctor Who at that age. He stated that "time travel and ghosts are echoes of one another. What is a ghost, if not a fragment caught in time?" He aimed to show suspense and tension, as he felt it was more terrifying than "full-on shock horror blood and gore". Cross was inspired by The Quatermass Experiment and its sequels, and originally intended to have the Doctor meet Bernard Quatermass, though this was not possible, for copyright reasons. Cross was also inspired by Quatermass writer Nigel Kneale's The Stone Tape, which was why he set the story in the 1970s. "Hide" was intended to be a "very small, very restricted ghost story", but he was asked to make it bigger in the end. The different universe was present, but it was "smoke and mirrors" and the climax originally took place in the house, just in daylight and in the alternate world. The idea of the Crooked Man was something Cross said lurked in his imagination. The love story twist was added in later, because Moffat felt the monster should be more fleshed out, and Cross chose to mirror the love plot between Emma and the Professor.

Cross wanted to tell the story with "a small cast and as few locations as possible". Jessica Raine was offered the part of Emma Grayling, and later said that she had not realised "what an institution Doctor Who is" until she arrived on set. She said it was produced very differently from her series Call the Midwife. Raine had also worked with Matt Smith before on a play. Cross said that Raine and co-guest star Dougray Scott were good at filling out their characters, as he found it difficult to fully "evoke the history of a quite complex relationship" between their characters with just the script. Subsequent to filming her appearance in this episode, Raine was cast as Doctor Who's original producer, Verity Lambert, in a docudrama made for the show's 50th anniversary, An Adventure in Space and Time.

"Hide" was the first episode Jenna-Louise Coleman filmed as Clara. Cross only had Coleman's five-minute audition for "Asylum of the Daleks", in which she played a different but mysteriously linked character to work from, and some editing was done to her lines to make her sound less "bitchy". Otherwise, the scripting process was "smooth". The read-through for "Hide" took place on 21 May 2012; filming began three days later, on the 24th. Scenes for the mansion were filmed at Margam Country Park in June. Tyntesfield, a National Trust property near Bristol, was used as the mansion. The scenes in the forest were filmed in the Gethin Forest in Wales, with artificial mist. The Crooked Man's movements were done in reverse and then played forward, to give it an unnatural movement. Director Jamie Payne had Cross's children be "monster consultants" during filming and evaluate if it was scary enough.

== Cultural references ==
The episode also contains several cultural references. Clara introduces herself and the Doctor as "Ghostbusters", a reference to the film of the same name which would not be made for another nine years from the time at which the episode is set. The Doctor recites in his dialogue the lyrics "Birds do it, bees do it, even educated fleas do it" from "Let's Do It, Let's Fall in Love" by Cole Porter as he realises that the Crooked Man is just a lost lover. The Doctor also mentions the Baker Street Irregulars, who assisted Sherlock Holmes in several of Arthur Conan Doyle's stories. However, the Doctor is in fact alluding to the Special Operations Executive, a British World War II organisation that Professor Palmer was a part of.

== Broadcast and reception ==
"Hide" was first broadcast in the United Kingdom on BBC One on 20 April 2013. Overnight ratings showed that the episode was watched by 5 million viewers live. When time-shifted viewers were calculated, the figure rose to 6.61 million viewers, making it the sixth most-watched programme of the week on BBC One. In addition, "Hide" received 1.53 million requests on the online BBC iPlayer for April, placing sixth for the month on the service. It also received an Appreciation Index of 85.

=== Critical reception ===
The episode received generally positive reviews. Neela Debnath of The Independent praised how the episode blended a haunted house story with a science fiction tale, highlighting the twist at the end of "ugly aliens have feelings too". The Guardian's online reviewer Dan Martin said that it had "the hallmarks of an episode that will be discussed for years to come", including the guest stars and atmosphere. He praised the direction, but criticised some of the dialogue.

Daisy Bowie-Sall of The Daily Telegraph gave "Hide" four out of five stars. Radio Times reviewer Patrick Mulkern gave "Hide" a positive review, highlighting Smith's performance and the spookiness. While he praised Raine and Scott, he felt that Hila was "shortchanged", and also criticised the "love story" ending. The A.V. Club's Alasdair Wilkins gave the episode an A−, praising the way it changed direction and the subtle hints about the Doctor.

Morgan Jeffery of Digital Spy awarded the story four out of five stars, writing that it flowed better than Cross' last episode, "The Rings of Akhaten", and allowed for the exploration of several themes. While he was positive towards the way the story was tied back to a time traveller, he felt that the ending was "perhaps less interesting than what's come before, simply because it feels more familiar", though it was still "solid". IGN's Mark Snow gave the episode a score of 8.4 out of 10. He praised the smaller scope and focus on character, but wrote "the left-field genre detour didn't completely convince, and felt jarringly underwhelming considering the spooky set-up, but at least it tried something unique". Jordan Farley of SFX gave "Hide" four out of five stars. Farley felt that the science fiction element left too many answers, but said that it excelled as a love story.

In Doctor Who Magazine, Graham Kibble-White gave "Hide" a positive review, describing it as "simply terrific." He said that it was the first "out-and-out ghost story" in the series, which he deemed "wonderful." Also, he described the story as "fascinating in the way it portrays the ghosts of the living," and said it "transcends Neil Cross' other story, The Rings of Akhaten, and even rises above the unfortunate mispronunciation of Metebelis Three."
