= Read-through =

Reading of a screenplay or script by actors with speaking parts

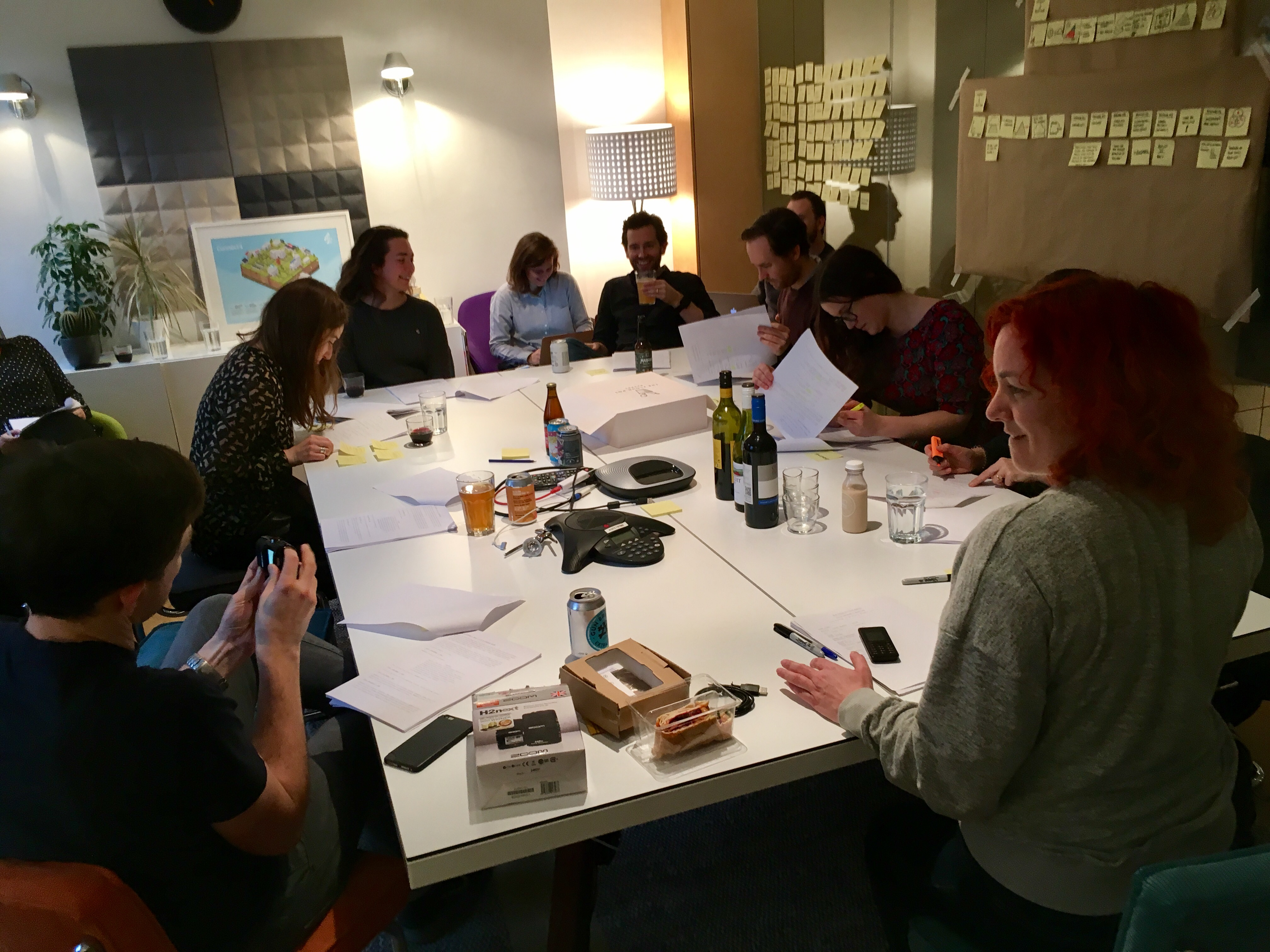
Read-through of sitcom pilot

The read-through, table-read, or table work is a stage of film, television, radio, and theatre production when an organized reading of the screenplay or script is conducted around a table by the actors with speaking parts.

In addition to the cast members with speaking parts, the read-through is usually attended by the principal financiers or studio executives, producers, heads of department, writers, and directors. It is generally attended only by people involved in the production. It is usually the first time that everyone involved in the production gathers together, and it is traditional for all people to introduce themselves by both name and job. The director may then open proceedings by making a short speech outlining their aspirations for the project.

An additional professional actor not otherwise involved in the production may be hired to read the non-dialogue parts of the script such as scene headings and action. These parts of the script are usually edited down severely for the purposes of the read-through to maintain the pace of the reading.

== In film ==
The read-through is an important milestone in the production of most films. It is a clear signal that all of the key elements, including cast, finance, and heads of department, are in place and that pre-production is almost complete. It is often the first time that the script has had a life beyond the written word, and it is also an opportunity for everyone involved in production to get at least a partial insight into the way the actors may approach their roles.

In addition, a read-through is often a powerful tool for identifying problem areas in the script. Wooden dialogue, unbelievable situations, or boring sections of the film that have not been addressed during the script development process often become apparent during the read-through.
