= The Five(ish) Doctors Reboot =

2013 comedy short film

- From left to right: Baker, McCoy and Davison
- Written by: Peter Davison
- Directed by: Peter Davison
- Starring: Peter Davison; Sylvester McCoy; Colin Baker; Paul McGann
- Country of origin: United Kingdom
- Original language: English

Production
- Executive producers: Steven Moffat; Brian Minchin
- Producer: Georgia Tennant
- Cinematography: Simon Walton
- Editors: Ceres Doyle; Jamie Pearson
- Running time: 31 minutes

Original release
- Network: BBC Red Button
- Release: 23 November 2013

The Five(ish) Doctors Reboot is a 2013 comedy short film released on the BBC Red Button service after the broadcast of "The Day of the Doctor", the 50th anniversary special of the science fiction series Doctor Who. Writer and director Peter Davison stars alongside Sylvester McCoy, Colin Baker and Paul McGann, all of them former lead actors of the series.

The plot focuses on fictionalised versions of Davison, Baker and McCoy, who become disgruntled after not being invited to reprise their roles in "The Day of the Doctor", and attempt to trespass onto the set and secure roles in the episode. The Five(ish) Doctors Reboot features numerous cameo appearances from contemporary and former stars of the series such as Matt Smith, Jenna Coleman, Janet Fielding, John Barrowman and David Tennant, as well as executive producer Steven Moffat and his predecessor Russell T Davies. Filming took place across England, Wales and New Zealand.

The Five(ish) Doctors Reboot received acclaim from Doctor Who fans, and was nominated for the 2014 Hugo Award for Best Dramatic Presentation (Short Form).

== Plot ==
On Christmas Day 2012, Peter Davison watches the Doctor Who episode "The Snowmen" with his sons. They speculate as to whether Davison will be invited to return in the upcoming 50th anniversary special or if it will only feature the two most recent Doctors, David Tennant and Matt Smith. Davison dreams that he is invited back and given special treatment, but has a nightmare of Janet Fielding warning him that the production team doesn't want any of the old Doctors. Davison, Colin Baker and Sylvester McCoy desperately await invitations to appear in the special. They try to contact executive producer Steven Moffat, who avoids their calls and deletes their voicemails.

Davison reveals to Baker and McCoy that he has a contact working on the special who can assist them. They consider involving Tom Baker in their plan, but his voicemail reveals he is stuck in the Time Vortex again. Paul McGann wants in on their plan. McCoy returns to New Zealand to continue filming on The Hobbit: An Unexpected Journey, but becomes bored and impulsively returns to England to join the others.

Davison's scheme involves the three of them (McGann has work commitments) picketing outside the BBC Television Centre. A passing John Barrowman abandons his secret wife and children to drive the trio to Cardiff, where Doctor Who's production is based. Meanwhile in New Zealand, McCoy's absence has disrupted a scene, though Ian McKellen admits to director Peter Jackson that it might be "a slight improvement".

The former Doctors enter the Doctor Who Experience, steal their old costumes, and with the help of Tennant (Davison's contact and son-in-law) are able to infiltrate Roath Lock Studios and observe the filming of the special, "The Day of the Doctor". They take the place of three Dalek operators after locking them in their room. After a close call with some security guards which forces the trio to hide back on the set, they escape and catch a bus back to London. Davison deletes a voicemail from former Doctor Who executive producer Russell T Davies asking for a part in Davison's plan.

In post-production, Moffat deletes the scene with the three Daleks. However, when the editor reviews footage from the Under Gallery scene, he sees the former Doctors evaded the security guards by hiding under shrouds during filming. The editor conceals this from Moffat, ensuring that the former Doctors appear in the special.

== Cast ==
In order of appearance (per credits):

Cast	Connection to Doctor Who	Ref.
Sean Pertwee	Son of Jon Pertwee (Third Doctor)	
Olivia Colman	Mother in "The Eleventh Hour" (2010)	
Peter Davison	Played the Fifth Doctor; writer and director of The Five(ish) Doctors Reboot	
Louis Davison	Peter Davison's sons	
Joel Davison	Peter Davison's sons	
Jenna Coleman	Played Clara Oswald	
Matt Smith	Played the Eleventh Doctor	
Steven Moffat	Executive producer and lead writer of Doctor Who (2010–2017)	
Heddi-Joy Taylor-Welch	2nd assistant director on "The Day of the Doctor" (2013)	
Louisa Cavell (Note: Credited as Louisa Cavel)	Assistant director on "The Day of the Doctor"	
Lauren Kilcar	Costume assistant on "The Day of the Doctor"	
James DeHaviland	2nd assistant director on various post-2005 Doctor Who episodes	
Janet Fielding	Played Tegan Jovanka	
Sylvester McCoy	Played the Seventh Doctor	
Colin Baker	Played the Sixth Doctor	
Rhys Thomas	Comedian and Doctor Who fan	
Georgia Moffett	Played Jenny in "The Doctor's Daughter" (2008); daughter of Peter Davison and wife of David Tennant; producer of The Five(ish) Doctors Reboot	
Olivia Darnley	—N/a	
Niky Wardley	Played Tamsin Drew (companion in Big Finish Productions' Doctor Who stories)	
Marion Baker	Colin Baker's wife	
Katy Manning	Played Jo Grant	
Louise Jameson	Played Leela	
Carole Ann Ford	Played Susan Foreman	
Deborah Watling	Played Victoria Waterfield	
Sophie Aldred	Played Ace	
Sarah Sutton	Played Nyssa	
Lalla Ward	Played Romana II	
John Leeson	Voiced K-9	
Anneke Wills	Played Polly	
Lisa Bowerman	Played Karra in Survival (1989) and Bernice Summerfield (Big Finish companion)	
Matthew Waterhouse	Played Adric	
Paul McGann	Played the Eighth Doctor	
Jon Culshaw	Voice actor and impressionist known for impersonating the Fourth Doctor on Dead Ringers; later voiced various characters in Big Finish Doctor Who productions	
Jemma Churchill	Played Lady Forleon in the Big Finish Doctor Who story Creatures of Beauty; later played Jean in "Village of the Angels" (2021)	
Lucy Baker	Colin Baker's daughters	
Bindy Baker	Colin Baker's daughters	
Lally Baker	Colin Baker's daughters	
Rosie Baker	Colin Baker's daughters	
Bruno du Bois	Second assistant director of The Hobbit: An Unexpected Journey, featuring McCoy	
Peter Jackson	Director of The Hobbit: An Unexpected Journey and Doctor Who fan	
Ian McKellen	Voiced the Great Intelligence in "The Snowmen" (2012); played Gandalf in The Hobbit: An Unexpected Journey	
John Barrowman	Played Jack Harkness	
Alice Knight	—N/a	
Sarah Churm	Appeared alongside Davison in At Home with the Braithwaites	
Nick Jordan	Staff member at the Doctor Who Experience	
Brad Kelly	General manager of the Doctor Who Experience	
David Tennant	Played the Tenth Doctor; son-in-law of Peter Davison and husband of Georgia Tennant	
Richard Cookson	Script editor on "The Day of the Doctor"	
Elizabeth Morton	Peter Davison's wife	
Marcus Elliott	Played a UNIT soldier and a shrouded Zygon in "The Day of the Doctor"	
Ty Tennant	Son of Georgia and David Tennant, grandson of Peter Davison	
Barnaby Edwards	Principal Dalek operator, director of various Big Finish Doctor Who audio dramas	
Nicholas Pegg	Dalek operator, writer and director of various Big Finish Doctor Who audio dramas	
David Troughton	Son of Patrick Troughton (Second Doctor); appeared in The Enemy of the World (1967–1968), The War Games (1969), The Curse of Peladon (1972) and "Midnight" (2008)	
Nicholas Briggs	Post-2005 voice of the Daleks and Cybermen; Executive producer of Big Finish Productions	
Frank Skinner	Comedian and Doctor Who fan; later played Perkins in "Mummy on the Orient Express" (2014).	
Adam Paul Harvey	—N/a	
Derek Ritchie	Script editor on "The Time of the Doctor" (2013)	
Michael Houghton	Played a Chancellery Guard in "The Day of the Doctor"	
Dan Starkey	Played various Sontarans, notably Strax	
Russell T Davies	Executive producer and lead writer of Doctor Who (2005–2010, 2023–2025)	
Des Hughes	Line producer on "The Day of the Doctor"	
Gabriella Ricci	Production coordinator on "The Day of the Doctor"	
Sandra Cosfeld	Assistant Production Coordinator on "The Day of the Doctor"	
Christian Brassington	Played Alfred Stahlbaum in the Big Finish Doctor Who story The Silver Turk	

Various actors who appear via reused Doctor Who clips are uncredited. Jemma Redgrave and John Hurt (voice only) appear via footage from "The Day of the Doctor". Tom Baker appears via footage from Shada, and later "The Five Doctors" (1983). Juliet Cadzow, Ellie Darcy-Alden and Joseph Darcy-Alden appear via footage from "The Snowmen" (2012).

On the BBC's website, all cast members are credited as playing themselves, apart from Marcus Elliott (Security Guard 1), Michael Houghton (Security Guard 2) and Chido Nyashanu (Receptionist).

== Production ==
=== Background ===
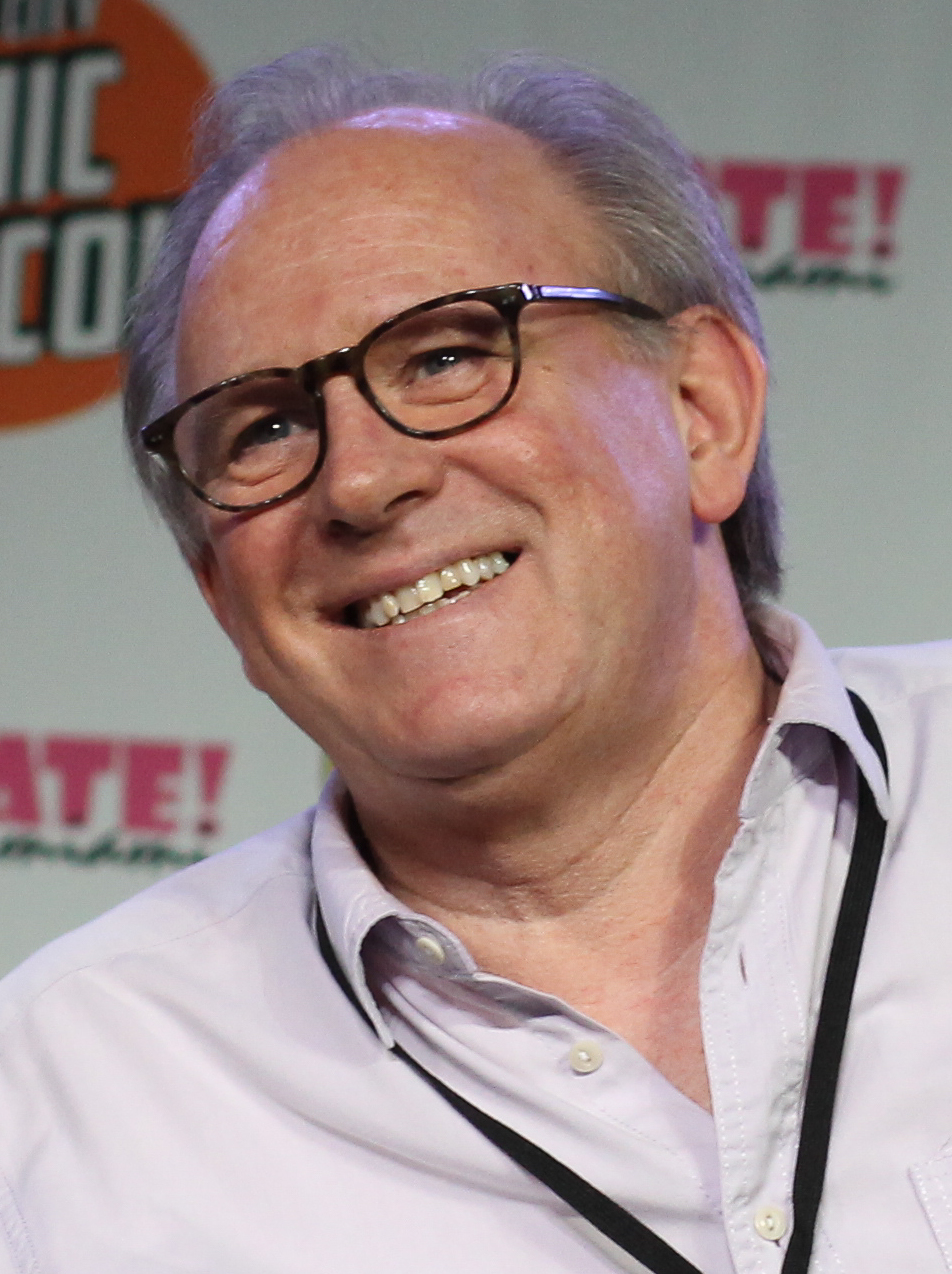
Peter Davison wrote, directed and starred in the short film.

The long-running British science fiction series Doctor Who has traditionally celebrated its past anniversaries with special "multi-Doctor" stories, where actors who played past incarnations of the lead character the Doctor reprise their roles. This was the case in The Three Doctors (1972–1973), "The Five Doctors" (1983) and Dimensions in Time (1993). For the 50th anniversary special, "The Day of the Doctor" (2013), the Tenth Doctor (David Tennant) was the only returning Doctor with a major role. Executive producer and writer Steven Moffat stated: "What we're not doing is the traditional massive reunion. It's a different kind of anniversary, and the spine of that is David and [Matt Smith, the incumbent Eleventh Doctor]."

Peter Davison, who played the Fifth Doctor from 1981 to 1984, decided to produce his own "fan video" as a substitute for not being invited to appear in the special: "The whole thing started off almost by accident. I was asked a question at a convention – 'Will you be in the 50th?' – and I said if I wasn't, I would damn well make my own!" He had previously produced skit videos in 2010 and 2011 for the convention Gallifrey One—the 2011 video humorously chronicles his quest to get to the convention on time. As stated by Davison at conventions, his original vision was for a significantly shorter video, around five minutes in length, involving the "classic" Doctor actors trying to get a part in the special. Davison bumped into Moffat at a party and offered him an acting role in the video. Moffat agreed, and after Davison sent through the script, gave him BBC funding and a camera crew. According to Sylvester McCoy, some filming had been done with Davison in Australia prior to the BBC's involvement. The film was Davison's first experience as a professional director. His daughter, Georgia Tennant, produced the film.

=== Casting ===
McCoy, Colin Baker and Paul McGann came on board to play fictionalised versions of themselves. Davison enjoyed playing his "grumpy" alter ego. Of all the Doctor Who cast and crew members asked, only one individual turned down an offer to appear in the film. Davison wrote a scene where Tom Baker rejects the other characters' scheme, but when Baker failed to respond to his emails, Davison decided to jokingly explain his absence with a Doctor Who clip where the Fourth Doctor is trapped in the time vortex. The clip, originally from the unaired story Shada, had previously been used to cover Baker's absence from "The Five Doctors". Davison stated "there was a point when I did try Tom one more time and I thought 'I kind of hope he doesn't reply because I'd hate to lose this joke'". Impressionist Jon Culshaw performed Baker's voicemail. The availability of the remaining cast was "very limited", and they were not paid for their involvement.

=== Filming ===
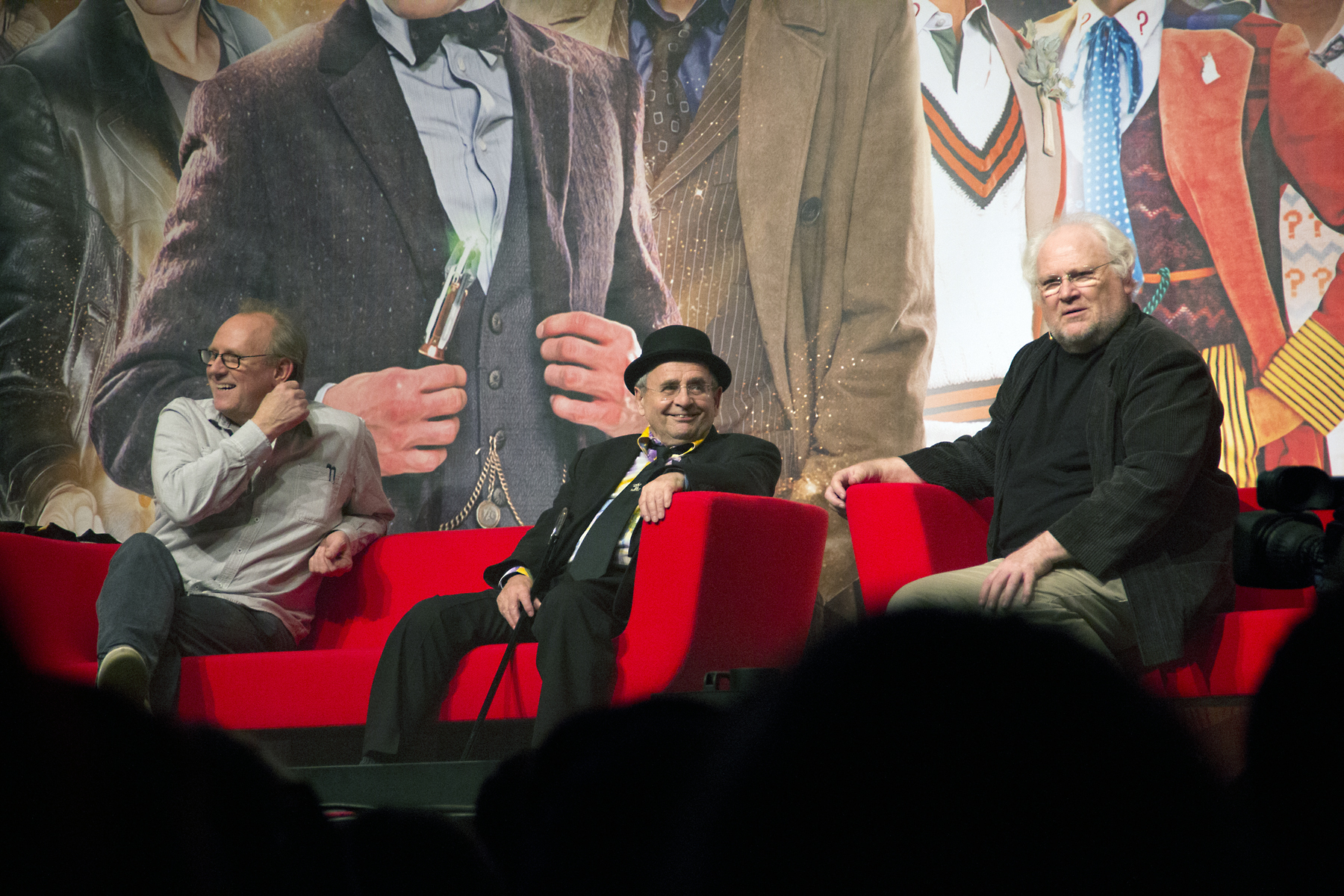
The stars of the film: (from left to right) Davison, Sylvester McCoy and Colin Baker

On the production's hectic nature, Davison admitted "I've never worked so hard in my life as in that year – because I was writing the thing at night and we'd film something the next day". McCoy's real-life commitments to filming The Hobbit trilogy (2012–2014) inspired Davison to write a scene featuring director Peter Jackson, a massive Doctor Who fan, which was recorded on The Hobbit's New Zealand set. Davison, Baker and McCoy were spotted with their prop pickets outside BBC Television Centre in September 2013, leading some fans to wonder if the trio were genuinely protesting against the BBC. Davison has joked that the trio were actually hiding under the shrouds in "The Day of the Doctor", but Moffat admitted that this is not the case.

=== Post-production ===
The Doctor Who production office were worried that the film's numerous references and in-jokes would alienate viewers, and proposed a shorter ten-minute-long edit which would be more accessible to new viewers. Davison rejected the suggestion and threatened to "tell the fans". He believed that the film was aimed more at fans of the classic series rather than the 2005 series. Per a compromise, about six minutes' worth of scenes were cut.

The film's title, The Five(ish) Doctors Reboot, is a reference to "The Five Doctors", the 20th anniversary special which aired during Davison's tenure. Six actors who led the series as the Doctor made appearances in the film (Davison, Colin Baker, McCoy, McGann, Tennant and Smith).

== Commercial release ==
The Five(ish) Doctors Reboot was released on the BBC Red Button service after the broadcast of "The Day of the Doctor" on 23 November 2013.

In September 2014, The Five(ish) Doctors Reboot was released on DVD and Blu-ray as part of the limited edition "50th Anniversary Collectors Edition" boxset. In November 2020, a limited edition Blu-ray steelbook of the 2013 specials, with the film as a special feature, was announced. In March 2026, the film was released with new commentary on the Doctor Who: The Collection: Season 21 boxset.

== Reception ==
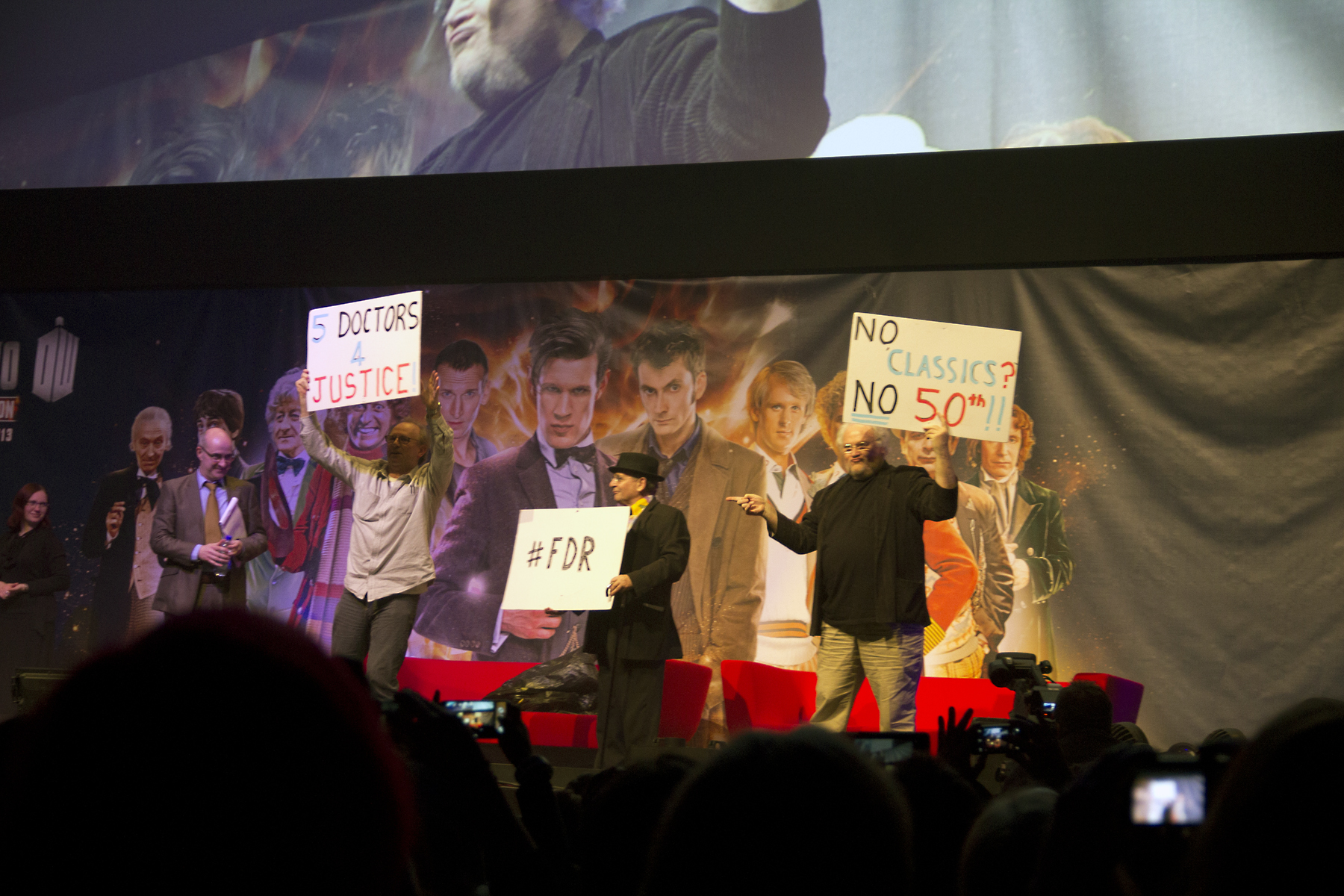
Davison, McCoy and Baker at the Doctor Who 50th Anniversary Celebration Weekend with the picket props used in the film

Davison was cautious of the Doctor Who fanbase's reaction to the project—"because we were sending up a lot of [the series]"—but fan reaction was universally positive. It was nominated for the 2014 Hugo Award for Best Dramatic Presentation (Short Form), along with "The Day of the Doctor", but lost to the Game of Thrones episode "The Rains of Castamere" (2013).

Ben Lawrence of The Telegraph praised the film, describing it as "a sweet, often funny homage to the show," concluding that it "was both a satisfying in-joke for Whovians and a naughty dig at the neediness of actors." Los Angeles Times Television Critic Robert Lloyd compared the film to "The Day of the Doctor" as "equally wonderful in its way". He praised the numerous cameo appearances, stating "one of the great pleasures of this madcap little self-deprecating celebratory half-hour is seeing who shows up and how". Patrick Mulkern of Radio Times called it "sublime" and stated that the "lovingly crafted spoof... topped the evening". He also compared the trio of Davison, Baker and McCoy to the Three Stooges. Doctor Who researcher Mark Wright wrote that The Five(ish) Doctors Reboot "cannot be dismissed merely as a comedy sketch" and described it as a road movie.

== Proposed sequel ==
In June 2014, McGann reportedly stated that production had begun on a sequel to The Five(ish) Doctors Reboot. In July, Baker contradicted McGann by telling Flicks and the City that though a sequel had been discussed with Davison following the film's positive reaction, it was agreed that they "didn't want to do [a sequel] that was a pale imitation of the first". He added: "Clearly doing one about the 51st anniversary isn't going to be interesting. It's got to be about something else."

In April 2015, Davison said he would write a sequel if he came up with an idea that was "good enough" or "better" than the original. He noted that a major problem with a potential sequel is that The Five(ish) Doctors Reboot "had probably the best cast you can imagine... and it's very difficult to imagine getting that cast together again… and not paying them!" In July 2020, Baker agreed that a sequel would have to be done on a more commercial basis which the BBC probably would not allow. He mentioned that Davison, McCoy and McGann had discussed the sequel and were all keen to take part.

In July 2023, Davison stated that the planned sequel, to commemorate Doctor Who's 60th anniversary, was scrapped as he would have been required to significantly compromise on the concept. He admitted that the sequel's concept was deemed "utterly unacceptable" by "those [he] showed it to" and that "people don't appreciate some of the jokes", stating "It's a different world now. And I am always – I wouldn't say – pushing the boundaries. My sense of humour is maybe a little out of sync with the sense of humour that now exists".
