= The Snowmen =

2012 Doctor Who episode

231 – "The Snowmen"
- Doctor Who episode
- Promotional poster

Cast
- Doctor: Matt Smith – Eleventh Doctor
- Companion: Jenna-Louise Coleman – Clara Oswin Oswald
- Others: Richard E. Grant – Dr Simeon; Dan Starkey – Strax; Catrin Stewart – Jenny Flint; Neve McIntosh – Madame Vastra; Tom Ward – Captain Latimer; Liz White – Alice; Joseph Darcey-Alden – Digby; Ellie Darcey-Alden – Francesca; Ian McKellen – The Great Intelligence; Juliet Cadzow – Voice of the Ice Governess; Jim Conway – Uncle Josh; Cameron Strefford – Young Walter; Annabelle Dowler – Walter's Mother; Ben Addis – Bob Chilcott; Daniel Hyde – Lead Worker; Sophie Miller-Sheen – Girl

Production
- Directed by: Saul Metzstein
- Written by: Steven Moffat
- Produced by: Marcus Wilson
- Executive producers: Steven Moffat; Caroline Skinner
- Music by: Murray Gold
- Running time: 60 minutes
- First broadcast: 25 December 2012

Chronology
← Preceded by "The Angels Take Manhattan"	Followed by → "The Bells of Saint John"

"The Snowmen" is an episode in the seventh series of the British science fiction television series Doctor Who, first broadcast on Christmas Day 2012 on BBC One. It is the eighth Doctor Who Christmas special since the show's 2005 revival and the first to be within a series. It was written by head writer and executive producer Steven Moffat and directed by Saul Metzstein, with the special produced in August 2012, and filmed on location in Newport, Wales and Bristol.

Set in the Victorian era, the story sees the Doctor (Matt Smith), an alien time traveller, retired and in hiding. He is soon forced out of hiding to investigate mysterious, sentient snowmen that are building themselves and meets Clara Oswald (Jenna-Louise Coleman), a governess also investigating the snowmen. With the help of allies – Silurian Madame Vastra (Neve McIntosh), her human wife Jenny Flint (Catrin Stewart), and Sontaran Strax (Dan Starkey) – they discover that the snowmen are being animated by the Great Intelligence (voiced by Ian McKellen) with the help of a man named Dr Simeon (Richard E. Grant).

The episode builds upon the surprise introduction of the Doctor's new companion in "Asylum of the Daleks", and acts as the opening component for the overarching plot for the second half of the seventh series, concerning her appearances before she is encountered in the present day in the following episode, "The Bells of Saint John". The episode also introduced a redesigned TARDIS, and a change of costume for Smith's Doctor, alongside a revised title sequence and theme music to coincide with the buildup to the 50th anniversary of Doctor Who. It received final ratings of 9.87 million viewers in the UK, becoming the fourth most-watched programme of Christmas Day. "The Snowmen" was met with positive reviews from critics, most of whom received the introduction and character of Clara well, but were critical over elements of the plot.

== Plot ==
=== Prequels ===
To promote the special, three minisode prequels were released. The first was broadcast during the 2012 Children in Need telethon on 16 November 2012, titled "The Great Detective". The Silurian Madame Vastra, her human wife Jenny Flint, and the Sontaran Strax describe a number of strange phenomena to the Eleventh Doctor, who tells the group that he has retired.

A second prequel, titled "Vastra Investigates", was released online on 17 December 2012. At the end of a case, Vastra and Jenny converse with an officer from Scotland Yard and apologise for Strax's violent wishes for the culprit's punishment. Vastra explains Strax's origins as a clone warrior from outer space as well as her own as a prehistoric intelligent reptile to the officer, much to his astonishment. Vastra reveals that she was awoken by an extension to the London Underground and initially disliked humans, though that changed when she fell in love with Jenny. On the carriage ride home, Jenny notices it is beginning to snow and Vastra notes that the snow should be impossible because there are no clouds in the sky.

A third prequel, titled "The Battle of Demon's Run — Two Days Later", was released on the United States iTunes and Amazon Video stores on 25 March 2013. Two days after Strax's apparent death at Demon's Run, Vastra and Jenny convince him that he is not mortally wounded and invite him to accompany them back to 1800s London. The scene had been filmed as an extra due to the anticipation that fans would ask how Strax was resurrected and came to be in Vastra's employ.

=== Synopsis ===
Following the loss of Amy and Rory, The Doctor fell into depression and has retired from saving people and uses his allies Vastra, Jenny, and Strax to keep people away from him while he lives in the clouds above 1892 London. Barmaid Clara Oswin Oswald encounters the Doctor, and the two of them are surrounded by snowmen created from snow with psychic properties. The Doctor realises that Clara's thoughts are creating the snowmen and ends the threat by instructing her to think of them melting.

Clara returns to her other job as governess for Digby and Francesca Latimer. Francesca has been having horrible dreams about their previous governess returning from the dead. Clara realises that the pond which contains the old governess' body is the only thing still frozen around them. She attempts to track down the Doctor, and is taken to see Vastra. Vastra tells Clara she gets only one word to impress the Doctor with if she wants his help. Clara chooses the word "Pond", which arouses the Doctor's interest.

The Doctor welcomes Clara to his redesigned TARDIS. The idea behind the redesign was to make the TARDIS look more like a machine again.

The Doctor visits the Latimer family's pond. He realises that the Great Intelligence, the entity controlling a man called Dr Simeon since he was a boy and the snowmen, is using the old governess' body as a DNA blueprint to form an ice creature that will retain its form and not melt. While Clara puts Francesca to bed, the frozen body of the governess breaks into the house. The Doctor tries fleeing with Clara, but Clara is mortally wounded by the ice governess, which is also shattered before Simeon can get the blueprint.

The Doctor tricks Simeon into opening a tin holding a "memory worm" inside, which latches on to him. The Doctor states that the Great Intelligence, which has been existing as a mirror of Simeon's thoughts, will vanish with the erasure of Simeon's memories by the worm. Instead, the Intelligence takes control of Simeon's body. However, the influence of the Great Intelligence quickly wanes, and Simeon falls dead. Outside, a saltwater rain has started, and the Doctor deduces that another psychic ability has taken control of the snow from the Great Intelligence: the Latimer family, crying for Clara. At her funeral, the Doctor reads Clara's full name on her tombstone and realises she is the same woman as Oswin Oswald, who died on the Daleks' Asylum planet. Since a person dying twice is an impossibility, the Doctor departs in the TARDIS to investigate, hoping to find Clara again.

=== Continuity ===
The Second Doctor previously encountered the Great Intelligence in the serials The Abominable Snowmen (1967), set in the 1930s, and The Web of Fear (1968), set in the 1960s. In these stories, the Great Intelligence uses robot Yeti as its physical presence. The events of The Web of Fear are alluded to by the Doctor in "The Snowmen" when he presents the London Underground biscuit tin to the Great Intelligence in Dr Simeon's laboratory; the Intelligence states, "I do not understand these markings", in reference to the 1967 London Underground map design on the tin. The Doctor remarks that the Underground is a "key strategic weakness in metropolitan living", referring to (and possibly setting in motion) the future Yeti attack on London via the Underground.

Coleman previously played Oswin in "Asylum of the Daleks", though the connection between the two characters is not clarified until Clara reveals she has an interest in soufflés, a trait that Oswin's character also had. The Doctor, after meeting Clara, wistfully replies "those were the days" when she asks why he isn't staying to get acquainted with her, which are the same words he tells Craig Owens ("Closing Time") when Craig comments that the Doctor always wins. The final scenes at the graveyard establish that Clara shares the same name as Oswin, leading the Doctor to surmise they are the same person. As seen on her gravestone, Clara's birthdate is 23 November, the date Doctor Who was first transmitted in 1963.

== Production ==
=== Writing and design changes ===
Writer Steven Moffat stated that he wanted an "epic" quality to the Christmas special. The story would also show how the Doctor had responded to losing his previous companions Amy Pond and Rory Williams; Moffat said that "I think he's probably reached the point in his life where he's saying, 'Friendship for me is just postponed bereavement — I want to be on my own for a while'." Moffat compared the withdrawn Doctor seen at the onset of the episode to the first appearances of the First Doctor (William Hartnell) in 1963 and the Ninth Doctor (Christopher Eccleston) in 2005. He also attributed the idea of a retired Doctor to a plot proposed by Douglas Adams in the 1970s, but rejected by the production team at the time. Continuing the theme introduced with the series' first five episodes, "The Snowmen" was promoted like a movie. A movie poster was released in the Radio Times, showing the Doctor and Clara ascending the ladder to the TARDIS.

The episode saw several major design changes for the series. "The Snowmen" is the debut of a redesigned TARDIS interior, as well as a new title sequence and variation of the theme tune. The new title sequence features a brief glimpse of the Doctor's face, the first time since Survival, the final serial of the classic series in 1989, that the Doctor's face has been seen in the title sequence. Moffat had noticed that the TARDIS' design was getting "progressively whimsical" and resembled more of a "magical place" rather than a machine. It was designed by series production designer Michael Pickwoad, who stated that the new interior was also supposed to be "darker and moodier" and provide an easier access to the "gallery" of the ship when shooting.

The Doctor also wears a one-off costume, Victorian-themed, which the Doctor's actor Matt Smith described as "a bit Artful Dodger meets the Doctor". Moffat described the new outfit as a "progression" as the Doctor was in "a different phase of his life now" and felt more "grown-up" and fatherlike. The costume was designed by Howard Burden for this episode. "The Snowmen" also contains several references to Sherlock Holmes, including the Doctor dressing up as him. Moffat is co-creator of the BBC series Sherlock, for which Smith auditioned for the role of Doctor Watson before being cast as the Doctor. In addition, the incidental music during the scene bears a resemblance to the Sherlock theme.

=== Casting ===
This episode marks the return of Jenna-Louise Coleman, who previously appeared in the series opener, "Asylum of the Daleks". Coleman was cast because of her chemistry with Matt Smith, and especially because she was able to talk faster than he. She auditioned for the role of Clara, not Oswin from "Asylum", as the concept of the two characters being the same only occurred to Moffat whilst casting for Clara. The production team requested that the press and fans who attended advanced screenings keep Coleman's appearance a secret until "Asylum" was broadcast; the effort was ultimately successful. Moffat stated that the introduction of a new companion made "the show feel different" and brought the story to "a new beginning" with a different person meeting the Doctor. Smith said that Clara was different from her predecessor Amy, which allowed the audience to see a different side of the Doctor. Coleman described her as resourceful and not intimidated, citing the reason for following the Doctor at the beginning as pursuing answers. The Clara who would become a travelling companion of the Doctor would not debut until the spring premiere, "The Bells of Saint John"; save for a brief cameo at the end of "The Snowmen". Coleman stated that she played each version as individuals with "trust that there would be a payoff" to her mystery.

Also returning to the series are Neve McIntosh as Madame Vastra, Dan Starkey as Strax and Catrin Stewart as Jenny. All three previously appeared in "A Good Man Goes to War" and reprised their roles both in this episode and in the prequels. They returned due to the popularity of Vastra and Jenny; Moffat considered a spin-off featuring them, though he did not have the time to do it. Instead, he decided to bring them back in the main series. Richard E. Grant had previously played the Doctor on two occasions, as an alternative Tenth Doctor in the spoof charity special Doctor Who and the Curse of Fatal Death, which was written by Moffat and as an alternative Ninth Doctor in the animated story Scream of the Shalka which had been intended to be a continuation of the series before it was revived in 2005. Smith commented that Grant was "born to be a Who villain. He pitches it on that perfect level and tone". Grant's appearance in Doctor Who was teased by the BBC via Twitter, announcing his appearance at midnight 5 August 2012. Tom Ward was drawn to his role because of the quality of the script, and also stated his young children were pleased that he appeared in the programme. The Great Intelligence was voiced by Sir Ian McKellen. The two children Clara is governess to, Digby and Francesca, were played by real-life brother and sister Joseph and Ellie Darcey-Alden.

=== Filming and effects ===
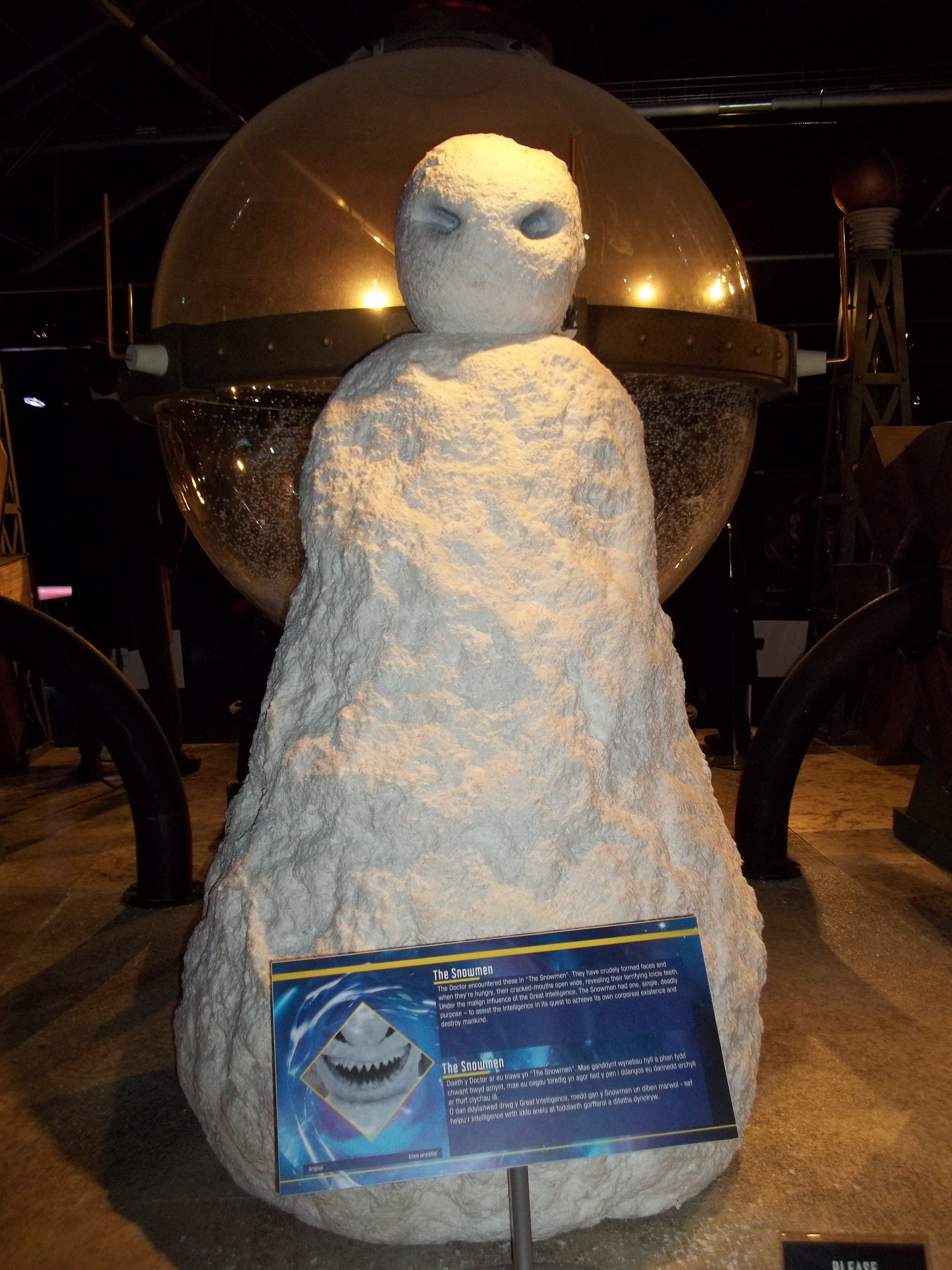
The Snowmen, as shown at the Doctor Who Experience

"The Snowmen" was originally intended to be produced in the fourth production block of the series and be the first episode Coleman shot as her character; however, it did not begin filming until the week of 6 August 2012, after Coleman had worked on later episodes while Moffat was writing the Christmas special. The read-through had taken place on 2 August 2012. This was the first Christmas special to be filmed in BBC Wales' new Roath Lock studios. Scenes featuring Coleman and several guest stars in a Victorian setting were filmed in Newport, Wales, while Coleman and Smith were also spotted filming in Bristol two weeks later on 21 August. Some scenes which used snow props were filmed in Portland Square, Bristol, where filming took place overnight on 21–22 August 2012. Bristol was chosen because it had Victorian-era architecture. Pickwoad stated that his favourite set is the London Street with the back of the pub, which he said was based on a sixteenth-century building in Oxford. The locations were blocked off and sprayed with fake snow.

The TARDIS on the cloud was achieved through a mix of fog on the studio floor and post-production special effects. Director Saul Metzstein explained that it was difficult to achieve the desired look for the snowmen; the first ones he likened to Zippy from Rainbow which was too "cute" an appearance, and so the effects team created more menacing CGI faces. Clara's introduction to the TARDIS introduced two novel effects for the show. The first was a single-shot camera tracking from a few feet away from the TARDIS to its interior, with the implication of the TARDIS's trans-dimensional nature shown to the audience. In the following shot, the camera does a complete circle of the TARDIS console, an effect not seen since the early days of the show. Metzstein wanted to include this shot to further emphasize the "bigger on the inside than the outside" nature of the time machine.

In addition to the three prequel mini-episodes, the cast also filmed an additional promotional video, "Songtaran Carols," which the BBC uploaded during the days leading up to the broadcast. The video featured Starkey singing modified versions of several Christmas songs in character as Strax as his castmates look on, before everyone breaks character and begins laughing.

== Broadcast and reception ==
"The Snowmen" aired on BBC One on 25 December 2012 at 5:15 pm, the same day on BBC America in the US and Space in Canada and the next day on ABC1 in Australia and on Prime in New Zealand. UK overnight ratings showed that the special had been watched by 7.6 million viewers, coming in sixth for the night. Final consolidated figures (not including BBC iPlayer viewers) showed that the episode was watched by 9.87 million viewers, coming in fourth for the night. It also received an Appreciation Index figure of 87, higher than most of the Doctor Who Christmas specials. The iPlayer version had 1,467,220 views, making it the most popular TV show on iPlayer over Christmas. The US airing was seen by 1.43 million viewers, with a 0.6 rating in the demographic of adults aged 18–49.

=== Critical reception ===
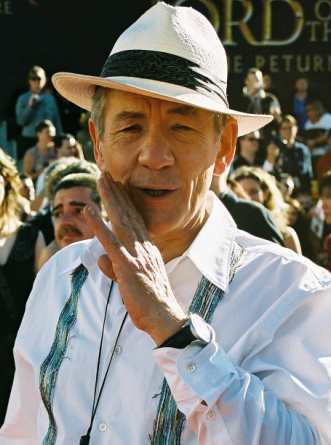
Some critics felt that Richard E Grant and Ian McKellen (pictured) had been underused as villains.

The episode received positive reviews. Rotten Tomatoes gave the episode an approval rating of 100% based on 8 reviews, and an average score of 8.4/10. Dan Martin of The Guardian called it "actually the best Christmas Special since 'The Christmas Invasion'" and the first to be "actually scary", with "everything we like" about Doctor Who and Christmas. He praised Coleman's introduction as Clara and the gang of Vastra, Jenny, and Strax. IGN's Matt Risley gave "The Snowmen" a score of 9.4 out of 10, describing it as "a rollicking, riveting masterclass in storytelling" which "refreshingly" lacked traditional Christmas references "in favour of some sparkling dialogue, gorgeous set design and fascinating characterisation". While he felt that Grant and McKellen were underused, he was very positive towards Coleman's "unpredictable" Clara. Radio Times reviewer Patrick Mulkern was pleased with the return of the Great Intelligence despite an inconsistency in the timeline he found, and praised the "lovely images" and direction of the special, though he felt the variation of the theme music "lacks the menace" of the original. While he was positive towards Clara, he was "unmoved by her death" as it was "plainly silly" that she did not look injured.

Nick Setchfield of SFX gave the special four and a half out of five stars, writing that "the power of emotion saves the day again" was appropriate in light of the festivities and many fairytales referenced in the story. Setchfield was positive towards the "terrific" comedy with Strax, Coleman and the "surprisingly underused" Grant, as well as the new title sequence and TARDIS. While he wrote that the subtle callback of the Great Intelligence was "a tad more interesting than the usual 'So, we meet again!' schtick", he ultimately felt their threat "never quite comes into sharp relief". Neela Debnath of The Independent wrote that "The Snowmen" was stronger than the previous year's "The Doctor, the Widow and the Wardrobe" as it was connected to the overall story of the series, but "still has a way to go if it is to live up to 'A Christmas Carol'". Despite feeling that it was "enjoyable", she noted that "the story feels truncated and rushed".

The Mirror's Jon Cooper also praised Coleman and the new side of the Doctor that was shown, comparing it to Rose Tyler (Billie Piper) challenging the Ninth Doctor. However, he felt the character-heavy story was to the detriment of the plot, which was "a classic Who set-up that ultimately suffers from a lack of explanation [and] more set-pieces than a coherent whole". He felt that the episode may not have been accessible for casual viewers, but offered much for fans in time for the programme's fiftieth anniversary. Dominic Cavendish of The Daily Telegraph gave "The Snowmen" three out of five stars, disappointed that it was not as scary as it had been hyped to be. While he was positive towards Smith and the TARDIS on the cloud, he criticised Strax and the "Sudoku-like complexity" of the script.

The episode was nominated for the 2013 Hugo Award for Best Dramatic Presentation (Short Form), alongside "Asylum of the Daleks" and "The Angels Take Manhattan", but lost to the Game of Thrones episode "Blackwater".

== DVD release ==
"The Snowmen" was initially released as a standalone on DVD and Blu-ray in the UK and North America. It was later included as part of the DVD/Blu-ray box set Doctor Who: The Complete Seventh Series in September 2013.

It has subsequently been reissued in several box set compilations, most recently alongside the Christmas specials between "The Christmas Invasion" and "Last Christmas" inclusive in a boxset titled Doctor Who – The 10 Christmas Specials on 19 October 2015.

== Soundtrack ==
Selected pieces of score from "The Snowmen" and the preceding Christmas special, as composed by Murray Gold, were included on a soundtrack released on 21 October 2013 by Silva Screen Records.
