= Deep Breath (Doctor Who) =

242 – "Deep Breath"
- Doctor Who episode
- The newly regenerated Doctor asks the Half-Face Man if he can remember where he acquired his current face, while at the same time wonders the same question about himself.

Cast
- Doctor: Peter Capaldi – Twelfth Doctor
- Companion: Jenna Coleman – Clara Oswald
- Others: Neve McIntosh – Madame Vastra; Catrin Stewart – Jenny Flint; Dan Starkey – Strax; Peter Ferdinando – Half-Face Man; Paul Hickey – Inspector Gregson; Tony Way – Alf; Maggie Service – Elsie; Brian Miller – Barney; Ellis George – Courtney; Mark Kempner – Cabbie; Graham Duff – Waiter; Peter Hannah – Policeman; Paul Kasey – Footman; Michelle Gomez – Missy; Matt Smith – Eleventh Doctor

Production
- Directed by: Ben Wheatley
- Written by: Steven Moffat
- Produced by: Nikki Wilson
- Executive producers: Steven Moffat; Brian Minchin
- Music by: Murray Gold
- Series: Series 8
- Running time: 76 minutes
- First broadcast: 23 August 2014

Chronology
← Preceded by "The Time of the Doctor"	Followed by → "Into the Dalek"

"Deep Breath" is the first episode of the eighth series of the British science fiction television programme Doctor Who, first broadcast on BBC One and released in cinemas on 23 August 2014. It was written by showrunner and executive producer Steven Moffat and directed by Ben Wheatley.

In the episode, the newly regenerated Twelfth Doctor (Peter Capaldi), and Clara (Jenna Coleman) land in Victorian London where they find a dinosaur rampant in the Thames and a spate of deadly spontaneous combustions. However, their friendship is put in jeopardy as Clara struggles to cope with the Doctor's new incarnation.

The episode has the first full-length appearance of Peter Capaldi as the Doctor, with Coleman reprising her role as his companion Clara from the last series. It also features Neve McIntosh, Catrin Stewart, and Dan Starkey reprising their roles as Madame Vastra, Jenny Flint, and Strax, as well as Capaldi's predecessor, Matt Smith, in a cameo appearance. The episode sets up the main story arc of the series revolving around a mysterious woman called Missy (portrayed by Michelle Gomez), who is often seen welcoming people who have died throughout the series to the "Promised Land", a place that serves as an apparent afterlife to deceased characters.

Deep Breath was watched by 9.17 million viewers, the highest ratings for a premiere since Matt Smith's first episode as the Doctor in 2010 and received positive reviews, with many critics praising the performances of Capaldi and Coleman, Moffat's script, and the introduction and stylisation of the new Doctor.

== Plot ==
A dinosaur materialises in Victorian London and spits out the TARDIS onto the banks of the River Thames. The newly regenerated Twelfth Doctor, and Clara Oswald, emerge from the TARDIS, and the Doctor, still affected by his recent regeneration, misremembers the names of the Paternoster Gang and confuses Clara with Handles before collapsing. While the Doctor rests at the Paternoster Gang residence, the Silurian Madame Vastra confronts Clara about her prejudiced attitude to the Doctor's changed face. The dinosaur bursts into flames; Vastra confirms this is not the first recent incident of spontaneous combustion. The Doctor and Clara separately investigate.

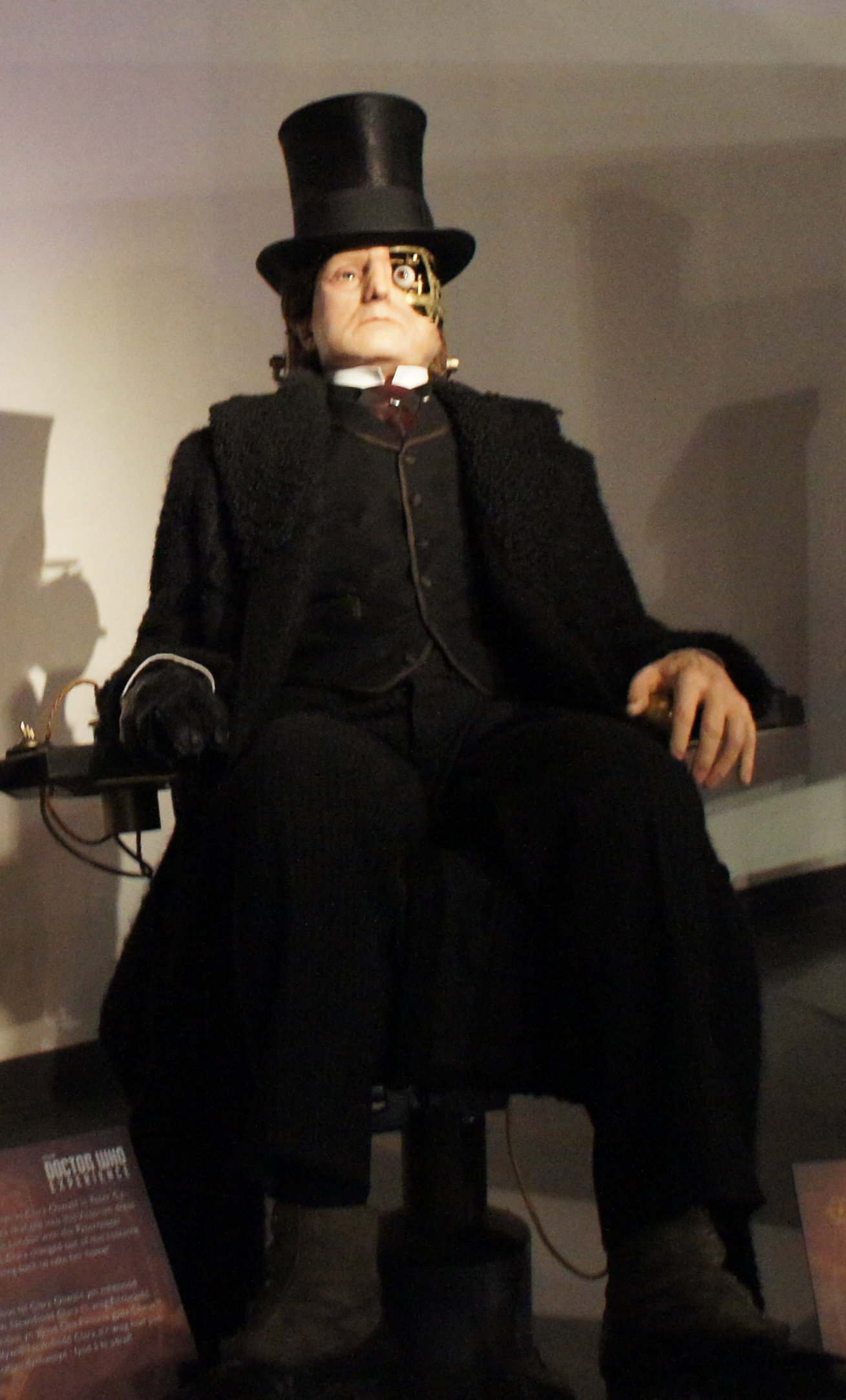
The Half-Face Man, as shown at the Doctor Who Experience

The next morning, the Doctor roams the back streets for answers, recognising his current face from before. Both Clara and the Doctor find an advertisement in a newspaper directing them to meet at a specific restaurant. They learn that neither of them planted the message, and discover the restaurant is part of a crashed spaceship filled with humanoid robots. Beneath the restaurant, they see a dormant male cyborg with half a face. The Doctor surmises the Half-Face Man is a robot replacing his mechanical parts with biological ones.

Upon Clara's prompting, the awakened Half-Face Man reveals that he is trying to reach the "promised land" by prolonging his life via parts replacements and he killed the dinosaur to use her biological material for his computer. The Half-Face Man deploys his escape pod—a hot-air balloon made of human skin—lifting him and the Doctor into the sky. The Doctor claims that the Half-Face Man—the other robots' control node—has replaced his components so many times that he no longer exists in his original form and does not want to continue his existence. The Doctor then warns that either the Half-Face Man will have to kill himself, or the Doctor will be forced to kill him to protect the humans. The other robots go lifeless; the Half-Face Man is impaled on the spire of Big Ben.

The Doctor suspects the person who put the message in the newspaper inviting Clara and him to the restaurant is the same woman in a shop who gave Clara the phone number for the TARDIS. (Note: As depicted in the 2013 episode "The Bells of Saint John") Clara expresses misgivings about the new Doctor's character and is unsure about continuing to travel with him. However, she gets a phone call from the Eleventh Doctor, made moments before his regeneration, encouraging her to stay, and reminding Clara that the Doctor is still the same person underneath. She agrees and returns to the current incarnation. The Half-Face Man awakens and meets a woman called Missy, who tells him he has reached the promised land.

=== Continuity ===
Madame Vastra's line, "Well, here we go again", refers to Brigadier Lethbridge-Stewart's utterance as the Third Doctor regenerates into the Fourth Doctor in Planet of the Spiders (1974). The Doctor remarks how his new face is similar to another he has seen, recalling how the Tenth Doctor met a man named Caecilius in "The Fires of Pompeii" (2008), also played by Capaldi. The call from the Eleventh Doctor to Clara is shown from the Eleventh Doctor's perspective from his final moments before regenerating on the planet Trenzalore, and using footage from "The Time of the Doctor". The cyborgs' concealed ship is named the SS Marie Antoinette, the 'sister ship of the SS Madame de Pompadour'. This is a reference to Series 2's fourth episode "The Girl in the Fireplace" (2006).

Towards the end of the story, the Doctor speculates on the identity of the person that wrote the "Impossible Girl" newspaper ad, suspecting it is the same person who gave Clara the number for the TARDIS phone in "The Bells of Saint John" (2013), both revealed in Death in Heaven to have been Missy. The closing dialogue between Clara and the Doctor about coffee, and the Doctor's inability to pay for them, recalls a similar exchange about chips between the Ninth Doctor and Rose Tyler at the conclusion of "The End of the World" (2005).

== Production ==
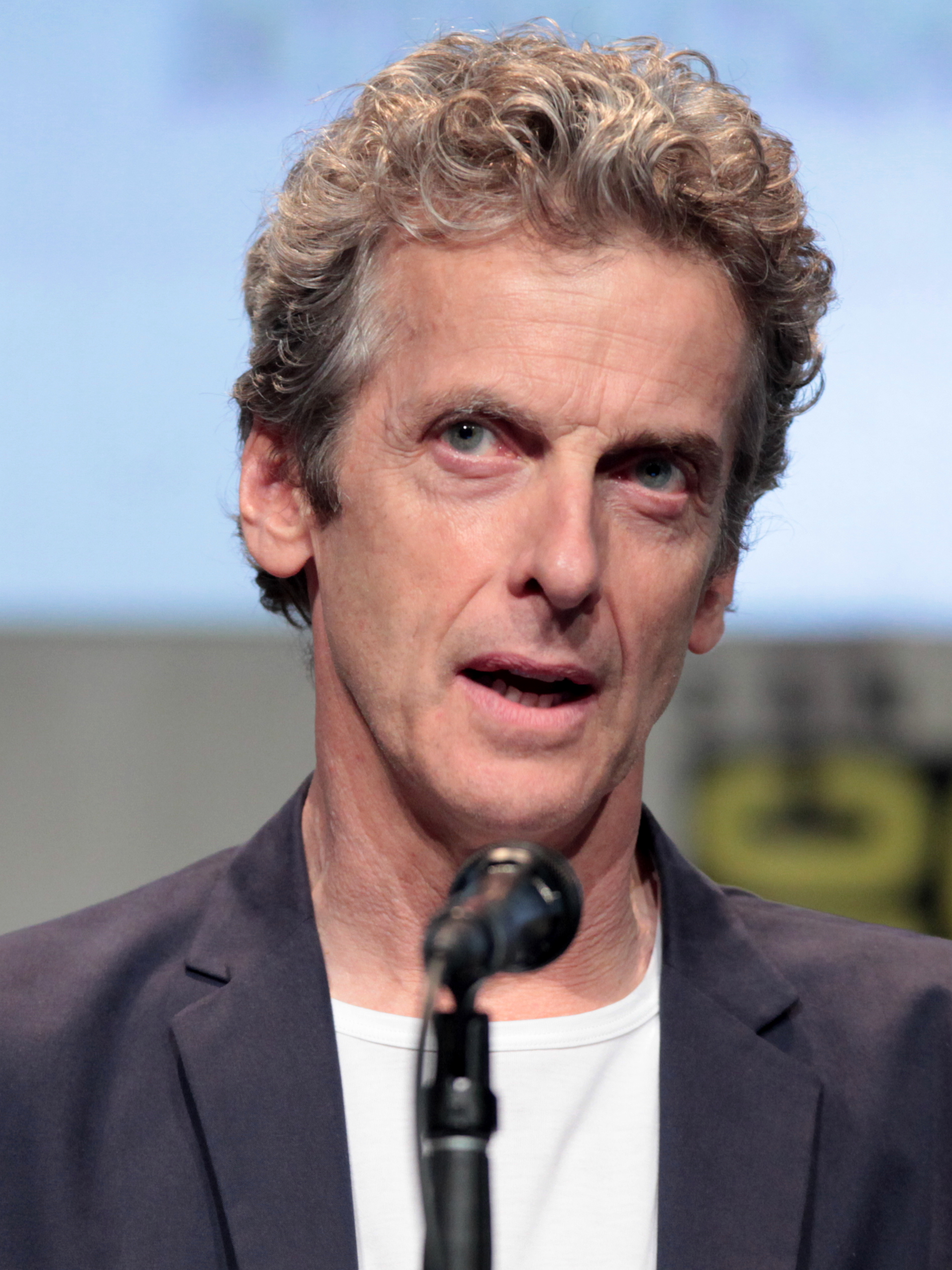
The episode was Peter Capaldi's first full appearance as the Twelfth Doctor.

=== Filming ===
Matt Smith's scene as the Eleventh Doctor was filmed on 5 October 2013, the last day of shooting for "The Time of the Doctor". Moffat had written Smith's scene prior to the rest of the episode. The readthrough for the episode was held on 17 December 2013, and shooting began at the Maltings in Cardiff on 7 January 2014. Shooting later took place at Mount Stuart Square on the 13th, Scenes were also filmed on Queen Street and on the 28th. An uncredited Rachel Talalay directed the Missy scene, as Wheatley was unavailable; she consulted him and tried to incorporate his ideas. The shoot finished on 18 February 2014.

=== Promotion ===
Steven Moffat has said that this episode would be a "big introduction" for Peter Capaldi as the Twelfth Doctor. He said that there will be "plenty of action and nonsense and jeopardy, as there ever is in Doctor Who."

On 11 August 2014 a 30-second trailer for the episode was released on Twitter.

=== Cast notes ===
Brian Miller, who plays the tramp Barney, is the widower of Elisabeth Sladen who portrayed long-time companion Sarah Jane Smith. He had previously appeared in Snakedance in Season 20, as well as playing Harry Sowersby in The Mad Woman in the Attic, an episode of The Sarah Jane Adventures, and providing Dalek voices for both Resurrection of the Daleks and Remembrance of the Daleks.

== Broadcast and reception ==
=== Pre-broadcast leak ===
On 6 July 2014, the scripts for the first five episodes of the series (including "Deep Breath") were inadvertently leaked online from BBC Worldwide's Latin America headquarters, prompting a plea from BBC Worldwide to keep the storylines of the five episodes secret. Also leaked was a black-and-white rough cut of "Deep Breath", missing most of the visual effects but otherwise mostly complete. The BBC blamed the leak on the fact that the files had been stored on a publicly accessible server in its new Miami-based headquarters. Steven Moffat, speaking at the London Film and Comic Con, called the leak "horrible, miserable and upsetting".

=== Television ===
The episode was simulcast in the United Kingdom and many other countries on 23 August 2014, and was broadcast later that same day in other locations such as on BBC America. On 31 August 2014, the episode was broadcast on Prime TV in New Zealand.

=== Cinemas ===
The episode had its world premiere in Cardiff on 7 August 2014 as part of the series 8 world tour. As part of the tour, advance screenings were also held at other destinations on the tour. As with "The Day of the Doctor", "Deep Breath" received a worldwide cinema release at participating cinemas on 23 August 2014. The episode received a midnight screening in 12 cities across the United States on 23 August, and a larger showing in 550 cinemas on 25 August. The cinema screenings of the episode were accompanied by a five-minute prequel.

=== Ratings ===
Upon airing in its 7.50pm timeslot, the "Deep Breath" simulcast entertained an average audience of 6.79 million in the United Kingdom. The episode reached a peak of 6.96 million viewers, watched by nearly a third of all viewers on the evening of broadcast with a 32.5% audience share. The final ratings for the week, which do not include BBC iPlayer viewers but do include viewers who watched the programme within a week of its transmission, showed 9.17 million viewers (37.9% audience share) saw the episode, making it the second highest rated programme for the week on British television. This was also the highest final viewing figures for a regular series episode of Doctor Who since Matt Smith's first full episode, "The Eleventh Hour", was broadcast in April 2010, although Christmas specials and the 2013 50th anniversary special "The Day of the Doctor" had scored higher viewing figures. Its chart position meant it became only the eighth episode of Doctor Who to be one of the week's top two most viewed programmes. In terms of L+7 ratings "Deep Breath" had 10.76 million views. The episode also topped BBC iPlayer for August, getting 2.06 million requests within eight days.

In the United States, the premiere airing on BBC America had an audience of 2.19 million viewers, the highest Saturday ratings for the network and just under the highest viewership from "The Day of the Doctor" special, combining for a total of 2.6 million viewers, a significant increase from the 1.5 million that had watched the Series 7 premiere in 2012. In Australia, the episode had a total of 1.19 million viewers on ABC. In Canada, "Deep Breath" had almost 1.4 million viewers overall on Space, becoming the second most-watched broadcast ever on this channel.

=== Critical reception ===
Professional ratings
Review scores
Source	Rating
The A.V. Club	B+
Paste Magazine	7.8
SFX Magazine	4/5 stars
TV Fanatic	4/5 stars
CultBox	4/5 stars
IGN	8.2
New York Magazine	5/5 stars
Radio Times	4/5 stars
The Daily Telegraph	4/5 stars

The episode received positive reviews, with many critics praising the performances of Capaldi and Coleman, Moffat's script, and the introduction and stylisation of the new Doctor. The episode was nominated for the GLAAD Media Award for Outstanding Individual Episode.

The Guardian responded well to the episode, labelling Capaldi's performance as "intimidating, bold and unsettling", and praising Ben Wheatley's direction in the episode's tenser moments, calling it "the stuff of true terror and wonderment". Matt Smith's cameo as the Eleventh Doctor was criticised by the Daily Mirror. However, it ultimately labelled the episode "impeccable", stating that Capaldi "has all the hallmarks of a great Doctor". Michael Hogan, writing for The Daily Telegraph, praised Moffat's writing for second guessing viewers' opinions about the new Doctor and for stating clearly that there would be no flirting for this face. Hogan notes that "the tone seemed different, too, quieter and more thoughtful – less about running down corridors holding hands, more about self-discovery and redemption." Hogan also stated that the script was similar to Sherlock, for which Moffat also wrote, and was a bit slow in places, but still combined behind-the-sofa action with humorous comments about ITV and the Scottish Referendum.

Brian Lowry of Variety praised Moffat's script, stating that it "emphasizes storyline continuity and easing faithful viewers into the regeneration transition" and closed his review by saying "It’s a skillful tonal balance that defines the best of “Doctor Who,” and exemplifies the ethos that keeps the series going strong, nodding to the past with all eyes on the future". David Wiegand of the San Francisco Chronicle heavily praised the episode, particularly Moffat's writing, saying that his script "masterfully manipulates audience expectation". He ultimately awarded the episode a perfect 4/4 stars.

However, not all reviews were positive. Forbes panned the story as "strangely recessive, unheroic, [and] dull", calling both Capaldi and Coleman's characters "insipid".

The scene in which Madame Vastra and Jenny Flint exchange a kiss generated six complaints to Ofcom, with viewers criticising the BBC for promoting a "blatant gay agenda". Ofcom decided not to investigate the matter further, judging that the complaints did not "raise issues warranting investigation." The scene was removed from the Asian broadcast of the episode in order to comply with Singapore's broadcast code.

== Home media ==
"Deep Breath" received a standalone DVD and Blu-ray release in the United Kingdom on 8 September 2014, the United States on 9 September, and Australia on 10 September. Thereafter, it was released in the Complete Eighth Series DVD and Blu-ray box set in the United Kingdom on 17 November 2014, Australia on 19 November, and in the U.S. on 9 December.
