= Neve McIntosh =

Scottish actress (born 1972)

- Born: Carol McIntosh; 9 April 1972 (age 54); Paisley, Renfrewshire, Scotland
- Education: Royal Scottish Academy of Music and Drama
- Occupation: Actress
- Years active: 1993–present
- Known for: Doctor Who; Gormenghast
- Spouse: Alex Sahla (m. 1999; div. 2009)

Neve McIntosh (born Carol McIntosh; 9 April 1972) is a Scottish actress.

== Early life ==
Born in Paisley, Renfrewshire, McIntosh grew up in Edinburgh, where she attended Boroughmuir High School. She was a member of Edinburgh Youth Theatre in the late 1980s, appearing in Mother Goose and Doctor in the House. She moved to Glasgow to attend the Royal Scottish Academy of Music and Drama, after which she was in repertory companies at Perth and at The Little Theatre on the Isle of Mull.

During the Second World War McIntosh's grandfather was captured at Dunkirk and died of pneumonia in a German prisoner-of-war camp in Poland.

== Acting career ==
=== Theatre ===
In 1995, she starred in a Glasgow stage production of The Barber of Seville. She then played in the RSC production of Dickens' Great Expectations, and starred as Portia in Shakespeare's The Merchant of Venice, and in The Scent of Roses at the Lyceum in Edinburgh.

In summer 2009 she performed in the Sylvia Plath play Three Women at the Edinburgh Festival. In February 2010, McIntosh appeared as the lead character "Catherine" in the play Proof at Perth Theatre. In September 2011, she played Goneril in a production of King Lear at the West Yorkshire Playhouse in Leeds. McIntosh appeared in the Actors Touring Company production of David Greig's The Events in mid-2013, also appearing in a production in New York in early 2015.

She appeared in the play Meet Me at Dawn in the 2017 Edinburgh International Festival, for which she received praise.

=== Film ===
She also appeared in American director Mark L. Feinsod's first film, Love And Lung Cancer. Alongside her television work she has appeared in the films Gypsy Woman and One Last Chance. In 2008 and 2009 McIntosh starred in several films, including Salvage, Spring 1941, (with co-star Joseph Fiennes) and the award-winning The Be All and End All.

=== Television ===
McIntosh played Beryl Stapleton in the 2002 BBC version of The Hound of the Baskervilles, and Fuchsia in the 2000 BBC and WGBH Boston production of Gormenghast, a miniseries based on the first two books of the trilogy by Mervyn Peake. She also played the title role in Lady Audley's Secret.

She appeared in the first British Sky Broadcasting-produced "Doc Martin" dramas (in which the Martin Clunes character was named Bamford, rather than his later name Ellingham), as a lonely villager with an asthmatic son, to whom Martin is attracted.

In 2004, McIntosh starred in Bodies, a medical drama produced by BBC Three and based on the book Bodies by Jed Mercurio. She has also appeared in several other television dramas, including Psychos, Ghost Squad, Marple, Murder City, Bodies-2 and Low Winter Sun. She also recorded an episode of Law & Order: UK.

In December 2009 McIntosh appeared in an episode of Sky 1's 10 Minute Tales playing the wife of Peter Capaldi's character.

In May 2010, McIntosh appeared in two episodes of the 2010 series of Doctor Who, beside the Doctor played by Matt Smith. She plays Alaya and Restac, two Silurian sisters who have been disturbed under the earth, one captured by humans and the other demanding vengeance. In October 2010, she starred alongside former Doctor Who star, David Tennant, in Single Father, a BBC drama. She portrayed the part of Anna, the sister of the dead wife of Tennant's character (Dave).

McIntosh returned as a new Silurian character, Madame Vastra, in the Doctor Who Series 6 mid-series episode "A Good Man Goes to War", which aired in the UK on 4 June 2011. The character is a sword-wielding, human-eating late Victorian crime fighter, and an old friend of The Doctor.

Neve McIntosh appeared in Ripper Street for one episode in the November 2013 episode 3 "Become Man" where she played the character Raine. She also appeared as Janina for 2 episodes of Dracula – a British-American horror drama TV series that premièred on NBC on 25 October 2013. The series aired in the United Kingdom from 31 October 2013, to 16 January 2014, on Sky Living.

McIntosh appeared in the BBC One series Case Histories as Joanna Hunter which aired in June 2011. She also starred in season 2 of the BBC Three drama, Lip Service, as a love interest of one of the main characters, Sadie.

McIntosh returned to Doctor Who in the 2012 Christmas special, and in the episodes "The Crimson Horror" and "The Name of the Doctor". In each of these episodes, she reprises her role as Madame Vastra, who along with her wife, Jenny Flint, and Strax, a former Sontaran nurse, form an investigating team. While there is a suggestive chemistry between Vastra and her chambermaid Jenny, in "A Good Man Goes to War", the later episodes explicitly mention that Vastra and Jenny are married.

In 2017, McIntosh played Kay Gillies in the BBC One drama The Replacement. She played Kate Kilmuir in Series 4 of the BBC drama Shetland.

In 2023 McIntosh joined the cast of All Creatures Great and Small (2020 TV series) in Series 4, playing bookkeeper Miss Harbottle.

==== Doctor Who appearances ====
- "The Hungry Earth" / "Cold Blood" (2010) – Alaya / Restac
- "A Good Man Goes to War" (2011) – Madame Vastra
- "The Great Detective" (2012, minisode) – Madame Vastra
- "Vastra Investigates" (2012, minisode) – Madame Vastra
- "The Snowmen" (2012) – Madame Vastra
- "The Battle of Demon's Run: Two Days Later" (2013, minisode) – Madame Vastra
- "The Crimson Horror" (2013) – Madame Vastra
- "The Name of the Doctor" (2013) – Madame Vastra
- "Doctor Who Prom" (2013) – Madame Vastra
- "Deep Breath" (2014) – Madame Vastra

== Personal life ==
McIntosh was married to Alex Sahla, a cameraman, whom she met while filming the 1999 TV series Psychos. They separated in 2006, and their divorce was finalised in 2009.

== Filmography ==
Date	Title	Role	Notes
1999	Psychos	Dr Kate Millar	
2000	Lady Audley's Secret	Lucy Graham, Lady Audley	TV movie
2000	Gormenghast	Fuchsia	NBBC's WGBH Boston production of lavish miniseries based on the first two books of the trilogy by Mervyn Peake
2001	Gypsy Woman	Natalie	McIntosh plays the lead role, an eponymous gypsy heroine.
2001	Doc Martin	Rita Gorrie	A lonely villager with an asthmatic son, to whom Martin is attracted
2002	The Hound of the Baskervilles	Beryl Stapleton	BBC version
2003	Doc Martin and the Legend of the Cloutie	Rita Gorrie	Repeat role from 2001 Doc Martin movie
2003	The Inspector Lynley Mysteries	Olivia Whitelaw	Episode: "Playing for the Ashes"
2003	Trial & Retribution	Carla Worth	Season 7; Episodes 13 & 14: "Suspicion Part 1" & "Suspicion Part 2"
2004–2006	Bodies	Sister Donna Rix	Produced by BBC Three and based on the book Bodies by Jed Mercurio
2004	Marple	Martine	Episode: "4:50 from Paddington"
2005	The Ghost Squad	PC Sarah Houghton	Episode: "Necessary Means"
2006	Murder City	Cassandra Wallis	Episode: "Game Over"
2006	Low Winter Sun	Daniella Bonetti	
2007	Coming Up	Woman	Season 5; episode 5: "Imprints"
2008	Spring 1941	Clara Planck	
2009	Salvage	Beth	
2009	The Be All and End All	Kate	
2009	10 Minute Tales	The Woman	Episode: "Syncing"
2010	Law & Order: UK	Cassie Shae	Episode: "Hounded"
2010	Accused	Roz Black	BBC anthology series, episode 'Liam's story'
2010	Inspector George Gently	Sarah Simmons	Episode: "Gently Evil"
2010	Single Father	Anna	a BBC drama
2010, 2011–2014	Doctor Who	Alaya, Restac Madame Vastra	8 Episodes
2011	Case Histories	Joanna Hunter	BBC One series
2012	Lip Service	Lauren	Season 2 of the BBC Three drama
2012	New Tricks	Cathy Sinclair	Episode: "Glasgow UCOS"
2013	Dracula	Janina	2 episodes
2013	Ripper Street	Raine	Episode 3: "Become Man"
2015	Critical	Nicola	Acting Clinical Lead, Deputy Clinical Lead
2015	Social Suicide	Detective Dalton	
2016	Death in Paradise	Nicky Hoskins	Episode 5.1
2017	The Replacement	Kay Gillies	Episode 1
2018	Shetland	Kate Kilmuir	Series 4
2018	Stan Lee's Lucky Man	DS Elizabeth Gray	Sky One
2020	Tin Star	Georgia Simmons	Series 3
2021	Traces	Julie Hedges	Six episodes
2023	All Creatures Great & Small	Miss Harbottle	Series 4; episode 2
2026	Half Man	Lori	BBC

== Radio ==
Date	Title	Notes
4 July 2014	The Events	BBC Radio 4

== Stage ==
Title	Role	Notes
The Trick is to Keep Breathing	......	Glasgow stage production
Dickens	.....	Royal Shakespeare Company
Great Expectations	......	in Stratford
Shakespeare's The Merchant of Venice	Portia	Lyceum in Edinburgh in autumn 2006
Sylvia Plath play Three Women	.....	At Edinburgh Festival in summer 2009
Proof	Lead character 'Catherine'	In February 2010 at Perth Theatre
King Lear	Goneril	In September 2011 at the West Yorkshire Playhouse in Leeds
The Events	Claire	Mid 2013 for ATC London. Written by David Greig

== Video Games ==
Date	Title	Role	Notes
2024	Still Wakes the Deep	Susan "Suze" Lafferty	
