= Longing (play) =

2013 play by William Boyd

- Written by: William Boyd
- Original language: English
- Genre: Drama

Premiere
- Date premiered: 28 February 2013
- Place premiered: Hampstead Theatre, London

Longing is a 2013 play by the Scottish writer William Boyd, based on the short stories My Life ("The Story of a Provincial") and "A Visit to Friends" by the Russian author Anton Chekhov. Its premiere production ran at the Hampstead Theatre in London from 28 February to 6 April 2013 (with the press night on 7 March), directed by Nina Raine and starring Tamsin Greig, Iain Glen, John Sessions, Jonathan Bailey, Natasha Little, Eve Ponsonby and Catrin Stewart. Boyd, who was theatre critic for the University of Glasgow in the 1970s and has many actor friends, refers to his ambition to write a play as finally getting "this monkey off my back".

Michael Billington, theatre critic for The Guardian, said that the play is "something of a hybrid: neither pure Boyd nor pure Chekhov. But it works because it deals with eternal Russian themes – and because it is performed with rare musical precision".

However, Clare Brennan, for The Observer, said: "Boyd tacks circumstantial details to plotline shreds then trims characters to fit his pattern. The result is not a patch on the originals."
