= Catrin Stewart =

Welsh actress (born 1988)

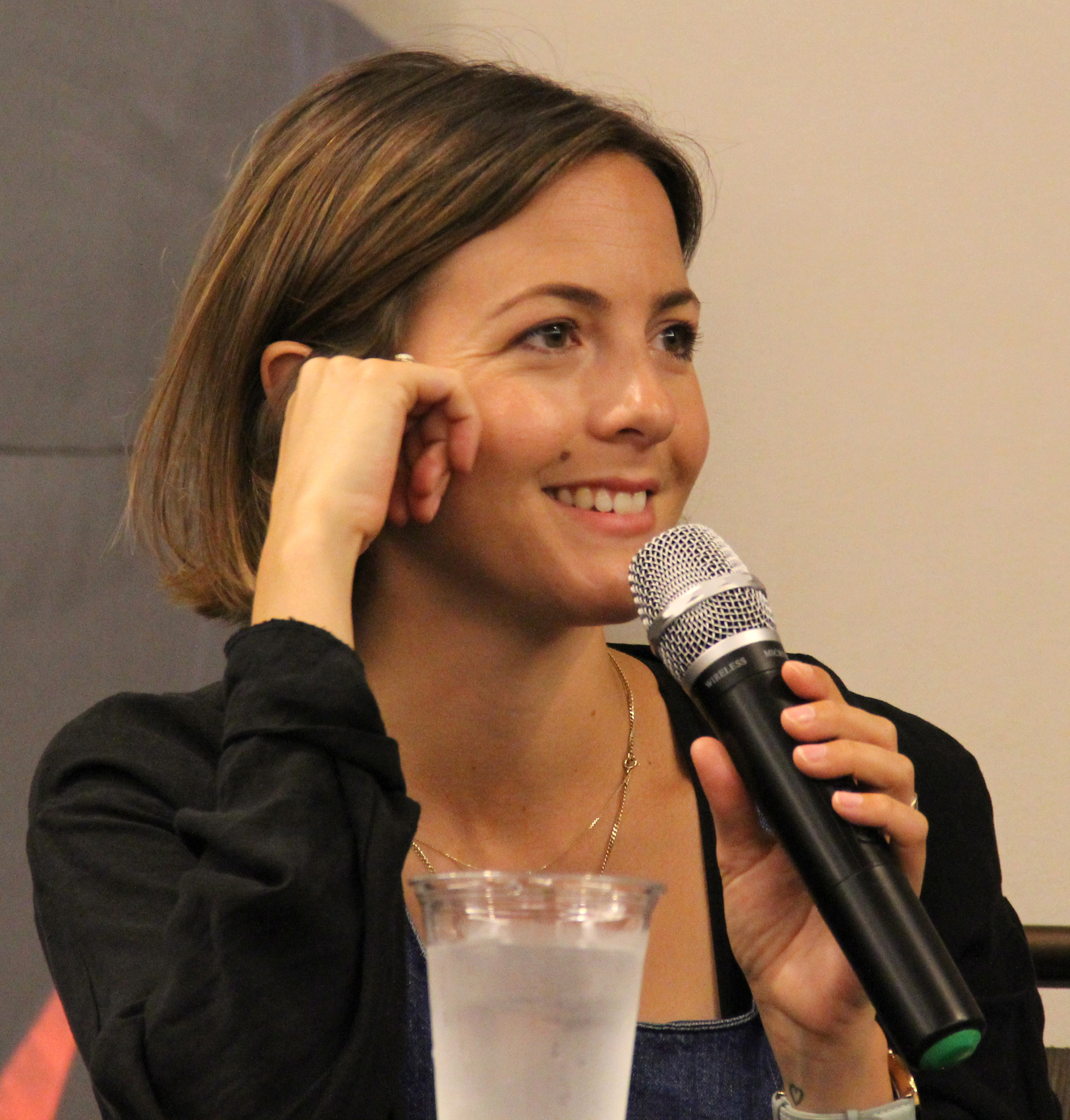
- Stewart at Con Kasterborous in June 2018
- Born: 29 January 1988 (age 38); Cardiff, Wales
- Education: Royal Welsh College of Music & Drama
- Occupation: Actress
- Years active: 2003–present

Catrin Stewart (born 29 January 1988) is a Welsh actress, known for playing Jenny Flint in the BBC science fiction series Doctor Who (2011–2014), Emma Morris in the Sky One comedy drama Stella (2012–2017) and PC Gina Jenkins in the S4C crime drama Bang (2017–2020). She also portrayed Lily in Misfits (2010–2011).

== Early life and education ==
Stewart grew up in Cardiff, Wales, and attended the Welsh-language secondary school Ysgol Gyfun Gymraeg Plasmawr. From a young age, she performed at the annual eisteddfod, a competitive festival of the arts between schools. Her mother used to tell her that she was "the one in the school concert she could hear out of everyone" as she was so passionate about acting. She went to drama classes from the age of 10 to 15, where she was mainly trained for television. At the age of 16, she joined the National Youth Theatre of Wales and went on to study at the Royal Welsh College of Music & Drama. Before graduating, Stewart had already appeared in the BBC One medical drama Casualty (2007), as well as the films Hearts of Gold (2003) and Crusade in Jeans (2006).

== Career ==
In 2011, she joined the main cast of the Sky One comedy series Stella (2012–2017), portraying Emma Morris, the "sweet, loving and funny" daughter of Ruth Jones' titular character.

In 2012, Stewart took on the leading role of Juliet in Headlong's production of Romeo and Juliet. Kate Kellaway of The Observer called her performance "one of the most captivating and touching [she has] seen." The following year, she made her London theatre debut in Longing at the Hampstead Theatre, playing opposite Tamsin Greig and Iain Glen.

In 2015, she starred in The Library Suicides, a twisty thriller from director Euros Lyn. The film won the Best Performance in a British Feature Film award at the Edinburgh International Film Festival, becoming the first Welsh-language film to do so. Stewart was also nominated for the Seymour Cassel Award for Outstanding Performance at the Oldenburg International Film Festival.

In a 2017 interview, Catrin Stewart reflected on her role as Jenny in Doctor Who, sharing that her favourite memory was working with Matt Smith on set. She mentioned the excitement of being part of the show and how the audition process was simple, with just one initial audition.

In 2023, she appeared in an episode of the BBC soap opera Doctors as Olivia Dean.

== Filmography ==
=== Film ===
Year	Title	Role	Notes
2003	Hearts of Gold	Maud Powell	Television film
2006	Crusade in Jeans	Cecile	
2012	Frail	Chloe	
2015	The Library Suicides	Nan Wdig / Ana Wdig	Welsh-language film
2016	Connie	Dolly Diggs	Short film
2019	Dirt Ash Meat	Rhian	Short film
2019	The Return of the Yuletide Kid	Catrin	
2020	The Arborist	Laura	Short film
2020	Cwch Deilen / Leaf Boat	Celyn (voice)	Welsh-language short film
2021	The Walk	Maeve	Short film
2021	One for the Road	Erin	Short film

=== Television ===
Year	Title	Role	Notes
2007	Casualty	Michelle Stevenson	Episode: "A World Elsewhere"
2010–2011	Misfits	Lily	2 episodes
2011–2014	Doctor Who	Jenny Flint	6 episodes: "A Good Man Goes to War"; "The Great Detective" (mini-episode); "The Snowmen"; "The Crimson Horror"; "The Name of the Doctor"; "Deep Breath"
2012–2017	Stella	Emma Morris	34 episodes: Main role in series 1–3; Guest appearances in series 5–6
2017–2020	Bang	PC Gina Jenkins	Main role, 14 episodes
2020	Cyswllt / Lifelines	Mabli	Welsh-language S4C drama; 3 episodes
2022	Casualty	Amy Trenshaw	Episode: "First Date"
2023	Doctors	Olivia Dean	Episode: "Bundle of Joy"

=== Stage ===
Year	Title	Role	Venue
2010	The Devil Inside Him	Dilys	National Theatre Wales
2012	Romeo and Juliet	Juliet	Headlong
2013	Longing	Kleopatra	Hampstead Theatre
2014	The Cherry Orchard	Anya Ranevskaya	Young Vic
2015	The Jew of Malta	Abigail	Swan Theatre
2015	Love's Sacrifice	Bianca	Swan Theatre
2016	1984	Julia	London Playhouse
2016	Cat on a Hot Tin Roof	Maggie	Theatr Clwyd
2019	Valued Friends	Marion	Rose Theatre Kingston
2022	Hamlet	Guildenstern / Reynaldo / Player Queen	Bristol Old Vic

=== Web ===
Year	Title	Role	Notes
2010	All Shook Up!	Cerys Matthews	
2012	"Vastra Investigates"	Jenny Flint	Prequel to the Doctor Who episode "The Snowmen"
2013	"The Battle of Demons Run: Two Days Later"	Jenny Flint	Sequel to the Doctor Who episode "A Good Man Goes to War"

=== Audio and radio dramas ===
Year	Title	Role	Production
2009	The Night Horse	Nansi	BBC Radio 4
2010	True to My Land	Janet	BBC Radio 4
2011	Direct Red	Nurse	BBC Radio 4
2011	Rock of Eye	Lauren	BBC Radio 4
2011	Giving It Back	Laura	BBC Radio 4
2012	The Diary of Samuel Pepys	Mary Mercer / Lady Jemima	BBC Radio 4
2012	Apple Jelly	Janie	BBC Radio 4
2013	Aberystwyth Noir: It Ain't Over till the Bearded Lady Sings	Calamity Jane	BBC Radio 4
2014	From A to Z	Suzie	BBC Radio 4
2015	Torchwood	Meredith Bevan	Big Finish Productions
2017	The New Adventures of Bernice Summerfield	Killian	Big Finish Productions
2018–2019	The Citadel	Christine Barlow	BBC Radio 4
2018	News from Nowhere	Ellen	BBC Radio 4
2018	Twenty Four Hours from Tulse Hill	Lisa	BBC Radio 4
2018	Home	Katie	BBC Radio Wales
2019	The Eighth of March	Jenny Flint	Big Finish Productions
2019	Curious Under the Stars	Fleur	BBC Radio 4
2019–present	The Paternoster Gang	Jenny Flint	Big Finish Productions
2020	Relocation	Ensemble Actor	BBC Radio Wales

=== Audiobook narration ===
- Clara and the Maze of Cui Palta (2018) by Susan Calman
- The Promise (2021) by Lucy Diamond
- The Crimson Horror (2021) by Mark Gatiss

== Accolades ==
=== Awards ===
- Edinburgh International Film Festival – Best Performance in a British Feature for The Library Suicides (2015)
- HorrorHound Film Festival – Best Actress for Connie (2016)

=== Nominations ===
- Oldenburg International Film Festival – Seymour Cassel Award for Outstanding Performance for The Library Suicides (2015)
- GenreBlast Film Festival Award – Best Actress (Short Film) for Connie (2016)
- Unrestricted View Film Festival – Best Actress (Short) for Connie (2016)
