= A Good Man Goes to War =

218 – "A Good Man Goes to War"
- Doctor Who episode

Cast
- Doctor: Matt Smith – Eleventh Doctor
- Companions: Karen Gillan – Amy Pond; Arthur Darvill – Rory Williams; Alex Kingston – River Song
- Others: Frances Barber – Madame Kovarian; Charlie Baker – Fat One; Dan Johnston – Thin One; Christina Chong – Lorna Bucket; Joshua Hayes – Lucas; Damian Kell – Dominicus; Neve McIntosh – Madame Vastra; Catrin Stewart – Jenny Flint; Richard Trinder – Captain Harcourt; Annabel Cleare – Eleanor; Henry Wood – Arthur; Dan Starkey – Commander Strax; Simon Fisher-Becker – Dorium Maldovar; Danny Sapani – Colonel Manton; Hugh Bonneville – Henry Avery; Oscar Lloyd – Toby Avery; Nicholas Briggs – Voice of the Cybermen

Production
- Directed by: Peter Hoar
- Written by: Steven Moffat
- Produced by: Marcus Wilson
- Executive producers: Steven Moffat; Piers Wenger; Beth Willis
- Music by: Murray Gold
- Production code: 2.7
- Series: Series 6
- Running time: 50 minutes
- First broadcast: 4 June 2011

Chronology
← Preceded by "The Almost People"	Followed by → "Let's Kill Hitler"

"A Good Man Goes to War" is the seventh episode of the sixth series of the British science fiction television series Doctor Who, and was first broadcast on BBC One on 4 June 2011. It served as a mid-series finale. The episode was written by Steven Moffat and directed by Peter Hoar.

The episode follows the cliffhanger of "The Almost People", which reveals Amy Pond (Karen Gillan) had been operating a Flesh duplicate of herself and is in fact held in a remote location and about to give birth. Alien time traveller the Doctor (Matt Smith) and Amy's husband, Rory (Arthur Darvill), muster an army of allies and set out to find both Amy and her child, a girl named Melody Pond.

The episode reveals the recurring character River Song (Alex Kingston) is Amy and Rory's child. River's identity was kept in top secrecy, and only a few members of the cast and crew were issued the correct ending of the script. The beginning of the episode contained many different locations which were challenging for the production team. The main setting, Demons Run, was filmed in a military base and hangar in Cardiff. "A Good Man Goes to War" was watched by 7.57 million viewers in the United Kingdom and received an Appreciation Index of 88. Critical reception was positive, and the episode was nominated for the 2012 Hugo Award for Best Dramatic Presentation (Short Form).

== Plot ==
=== Prequel ===
On 28 May 2011, immediately following the broadcast of "The Almost People", the BBC released a prequel to "A Good Man Goes to War". The prequel had Dorium talking to two Headless Monks. He gives them the brain of a Judoon, which contains a security protocol the monks need. Dorium tells them he knows what they are up to, as he has heard rumours around the area. He asks them, "All this, to imprison one child? Oh, I know what you're up to, I hear everything in this place. I even hear rumours about whose child you've taken. Are you mad? You know the stories about the Doctor? The things that man has done? God help us if you make him angry!"

=== Synopsis ===
The Eleventh Doctor and Rory have discovered Amy, Rory's wife and the Doctor's companion, has been abducted from them and her place taken by an avatar made from "the Flesh", a semi-sentient shape-shifting material. The Doctor tracks Amy's location to an asteroid base called "Demons Run" (or "Demon's Run"), and he and Rory gather several of his allies to attack. Rory tries to convince River Song to help, but she insists that she cannot since this battle is where the Doctor will learn of her true identity.

At Demons Run, Amy has been held by Madame Kovarian, who has taken her infant daughter Melody Pond. Amy befriends human soldier Lorna Bucket, who had met the Doctor before as a child on her home planet; Lorna gives her a good luck token with Melody's name, written in the Gamma Forests' language on it.

Demons run when a good man goes to war,
Night will fall and drown the sun,
When a good man goes to war.

Friendship dies and true love lies,
Night will fall, and the dark will rise,
When a good man goes to war.

Demons run, but count the cost;
The battle's won, but the child is lost.

— River Song, explaining the meaning of the name of Demons Run base

Aided by additional Silurian and Judoon forces, the Doctor and his allies, who owe him debts, secure the base, find Amy, and reclaim Melody from Kovarian. The Doctor celebrates his victory, but Madame Vastra informs him that Kovarian had been scanning Melody and found traces of Time Lord DNA; she asks if Melody could have been conceived while Amy and Rory were in flight through the Vortex in the TARDIS. The Doctor realises this is what happened.

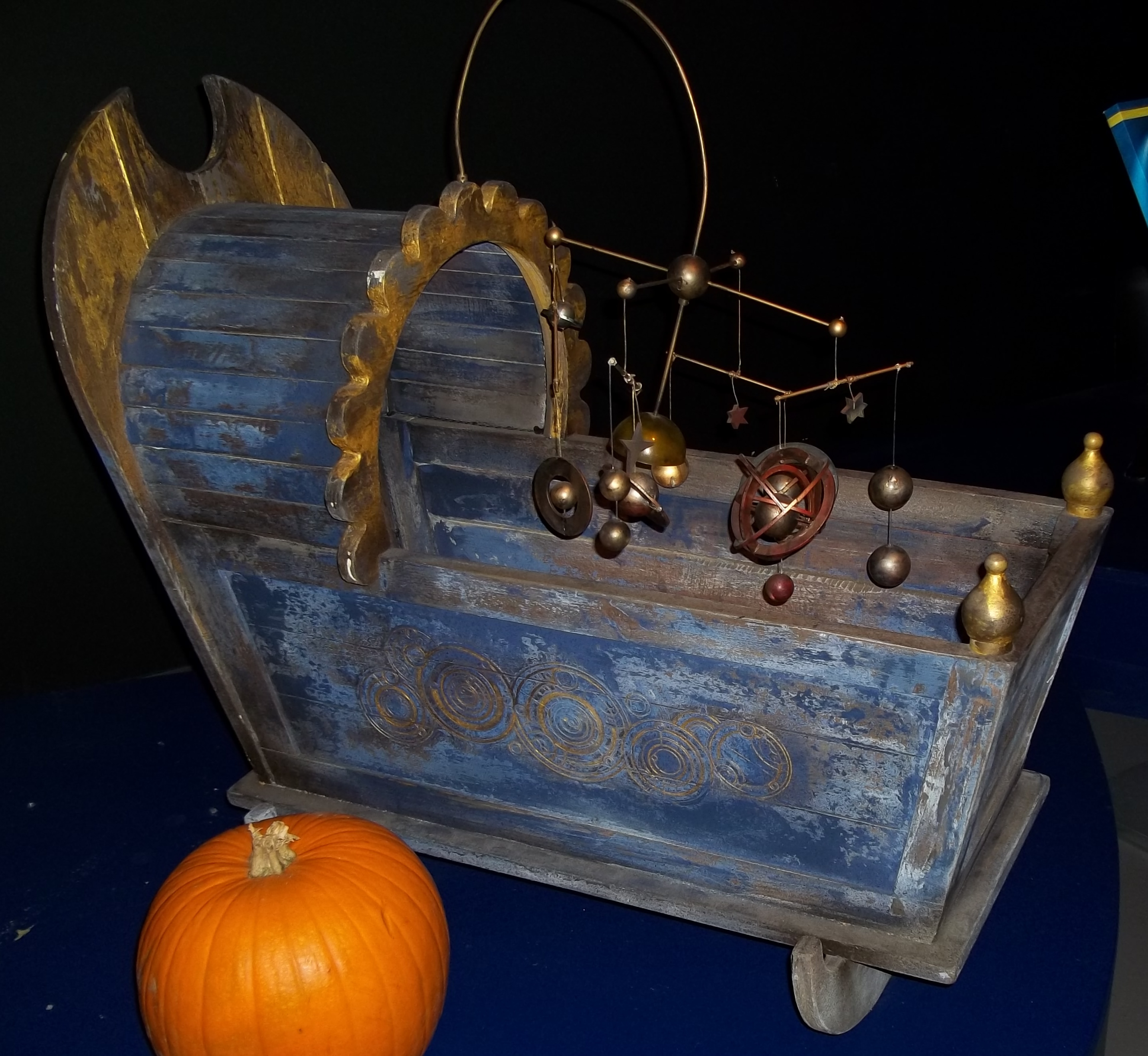
The Doctor's cot, on display at the Doctor Who Experience.

Lorna arrives too late to warn the group about Kovarian's trap. The TARDIS is blocked by a force field, and her army of Headless Monks attack, killing many Silurians, fatally wounding Strax and Lorna, and beheading Dorium before they can end the battle. Kovarian contacts the Doctor, elated to have been able to fool him twice, and reveals she will use Melody as a weapon against him. She sends a signal to cause Melody, made of Flesh, to disintegrate in Amy's arms, with the real Melody in her possession.

River Song arrives, and the Doctor berates her for not helping. River shows the Doctor Lorna's token for Amy, and the Doctor sets off in the TARDIS excitedly, telling River to return the survivors of the battle home. Amy demands River explain what the Doctor saw. She shows them Lorna's gift with Melody's name on it, and as the TARDIS translation circuits engage, River explains that Lorna's people in the Gamma Forests have no word for "pond", the only water in the forest is the river; the words come out to be "River Song". River reveals she is Amy and Rory's daughter Melody.

=== Continuity ===
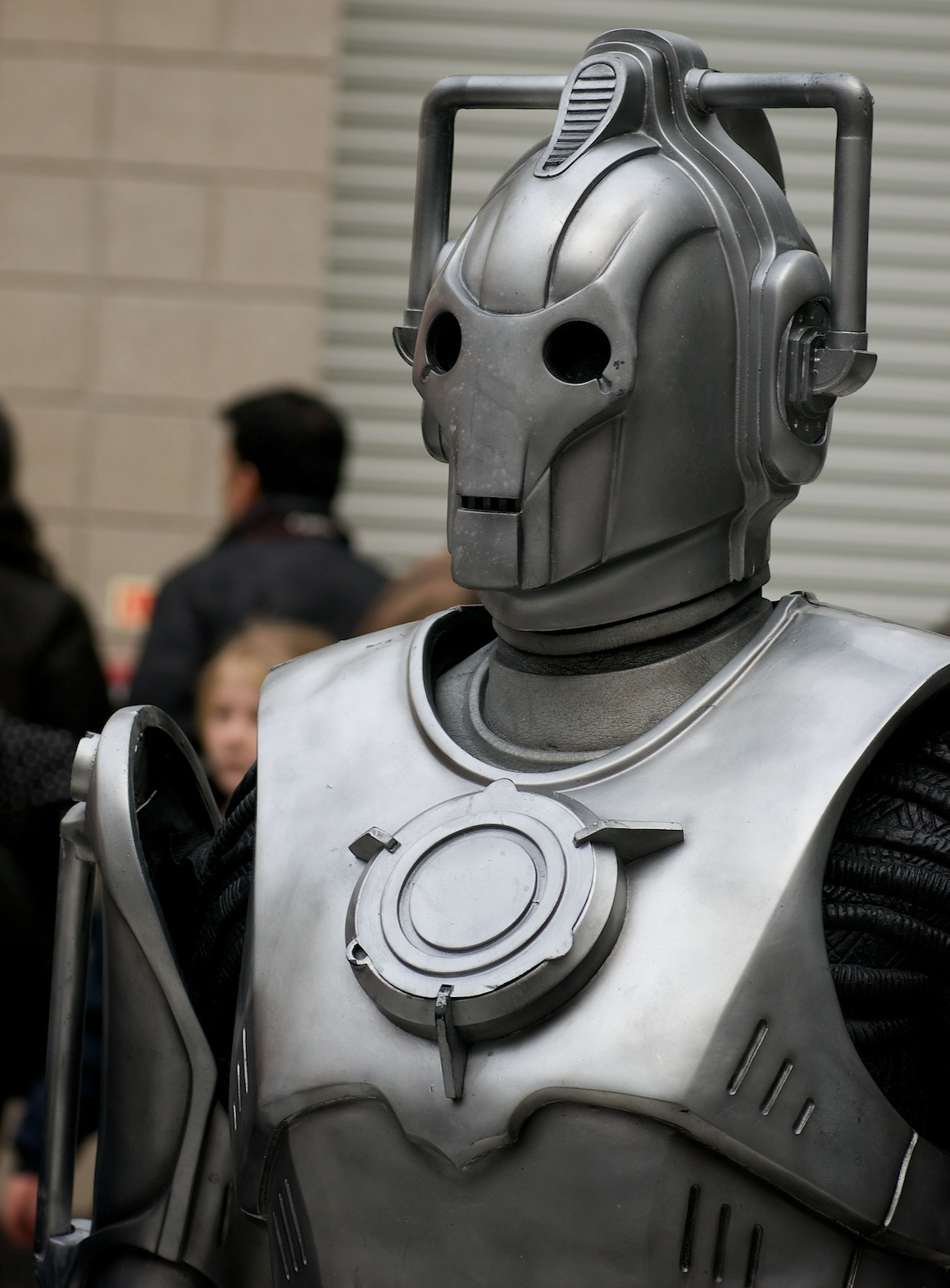
The Cybermen that appear in the episode are intended to be from Mondas, rather than the parallel Earth previously seen. This can be seen by the logo which is now a complete circle rather than a C.

The Cybermen that appear in the episode are intended to be from Mondas, rather than the parallel Earth seen in "Rise of the Cybermen"/"The Age of Steel". Rory wears the armour of a Roman centurion, as first seen in "The Pandorica Opens"/"The Big Bang." The Fat One and Thin One refer to the Doctor sending the Atraxi away from a planet before calling them back "for a scolding," an incident which took place in "The Eleventh Hour." "The only water in the forest is the river," the phrase River uses to explain why the people of the Gamma Forest translate "Pond" to "River," was first said to Rory by Idris in "The Doctor's Wife." In the seventh series opener "Asylum of the Daleks" it is revealed that Amy's experiences on Demons Run rendered her infertile.

== Production ==
=== Writing ===
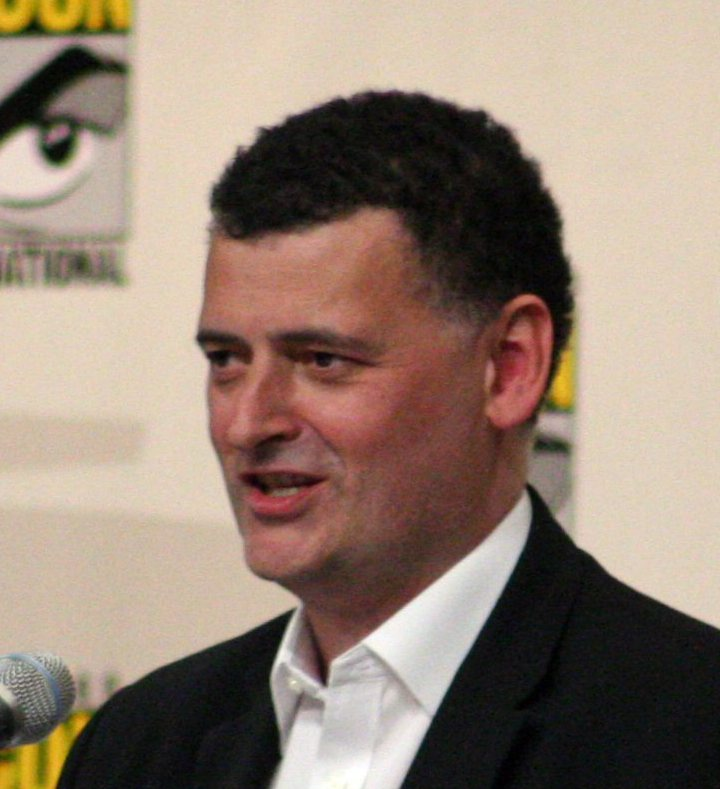
Steven Moffat wrote the episode to reveal River Song's identity and show the Doctor provoked enough to assemble an army.

"A Good Man Goes to War" is the seventh episode of series six and also the 777th episode of Doctor Who, but there are no seven puns as the production team did not realise this until after shooting. The episode's idea stemmed from lead writer and executive producer Steven Moffat wondering if the Doctor, who was typically a pacifist, could be provoked enough to assemble an army. The Headless Monks were first mentioned in "The Time of Angels", added to that episode's script to help explain the monastic look of the Delirium Archive the Doctor and Amy were visiting. Similar troops also known as "Clerics" appeared in "The Time of Angels"/"Flesh and Stone"; Moffat stated it seemed many armies in the future in Doctor Who were of religious origin. The possibility of the English word "doctor" originating from the Doctor was a notion made by Moffat on Usenet in 1995.

Moffat had planned the revelation about River Song "for a long time"; when creating Amy, he chose "Pond" for her last name to create a link. Moffat intended for the "answer to be as complicated as the question". Moffat informed actor Alex Kingston of the secrets of her character at the end of the previous series and she was not allowed to tell anyone; lead actors Matt Smith, Karen Gillan, and Arthur Darvill were unaware of the identity of her character. River's identity was kept in top secrecy; the script read at the read-through had a false ending, and only a select few were issued the real script.

The episode sees the return of several minor characters. Dorium previously appeared in "The Pandorica Opens", while Henry and Toby Avery from "The Curse of the Black Spot" and the Spitfire pilot Danny Boy from "Victory of the Daleks" make cameos. Moffat said he planned to include John Barrowman to reprise his role as Jack Harkness, but Barrowman was busy filming Torchwood: Miracle Day and was unavailable. Originally the episode contained a scene with Ood Sigma, previously seen in "Planet of the Ood", "The Waters of Mars", and "The End of Time", but it was cut from the final episode. Russell T Davies is still listed in the credits for creating the Ood.

=== Filming and effects ===
"A Good Man Goes to War" began shooting in mid-January 2011. The various sets seen at the beginning of the episode were challenging for the production team. A Cardiff alleyway was dressed to look like a Victorian street for a brief introduction scene with Vastra, while a hotel bar in Cardiff was used for Dorium's nightclub. Demons Run was filmed in a military base and hangar in Cardiff. Steam was added to the set to give it a more spaceship-like feel. The army of clerics was made larger with visual effects. The set used for the chamber Amy was kept in was the same used as the Oval Office in "The Impossible Astronaut"/"Day of the Moon". Baby Melody Pond was played by twins, a common practice used in filming so that one twin can rest while the other is on set. The twins were three months old. Gillan and Darvill were both nervous about holding the infants, but they felt it added to their acting. Gillan stated the episode showed a different side of Amy and thought female viewers would sympathise with her.

The Headless Monks were played by stuntmen, and so the actors were free to improvise on their choreography when fighting them. For the scene in which the hoods of the Headless Monks are pulled back, a shoulderpiece was created for actors who were shorter than the ones who normally portrayed the monks. Dan Starkey, who plays the Sontaran Commander Strax, previously appeared as Sontarans in "The Sontaran Stratagem" / "The Poison Sky" (2008) and "The End of Time" (2010). Neve McIntosh, who played the 19th-century crimefighter Silurian named Madame Vastra, previously played the sisters Alaya and Restac in "The Hungry Earth" / "Cold Blood" (2010). Both Starkey and McIntosh underwent extensive make-up and prosthetics for their characters.

== Broadcast and reception ==
"A Good Man Goes to War" was first broadcast in the United Kingdom on 4 June 2011 on BBC One and BBC HD and in the United States on BBC America on 11 June 2011. UK overnight figures showed the episode was watched by 5.5 million viewers, a rise of half a million from the previous week and coming in sixth place for the night. Final consolidated ratings showed the episode was watched by 7.57 million viewers with an audience share of 31%. It achieved an Appreciation Index of 88, the joint highest for the series at time of broadcast.

=== Critical reception ===
Professional ratings
Review scores
Source	Rating
Digital Spy	5/5 stars
IGN	9/10
Radio Times	5/5 stars
SFX	4.5/5 stars
The A.V. Club	A−

"A Good Man Goes to War" received positive reviews from critics. Writing for Radio Times, Patrick Mulkern found the episode surprising, entertaining and a demonstration of Moffat's storytelling skills, noting that the inclusion of various characters added excitement and depth, reminiscent of Seven Samurai (1954) or The Magnificent Seven (1960), and called it "a rather fabulous episode in which Moffat again gets to pull out the big guns". He particularly praised the revelation of River's identity and Kingston's performance for providing "an extraordinary combination of sarcasm/relief/happiness/sadness". He emphasized that the depiction of different sexual orientations challenged stereotypes. IGN's Matt Risley described it as an "epic" mid-series finale which "opened with a grandstanding, wonderfully OTT pre-credits tease and didn't really let up from there". He praised the spectacle and character development, but felt it led to a certain amount of "the odd rushed scene...forgettable supporting [characters], and little opportunity to develop the Headless Monks into anything particularly imposing". Keith Phipps from The A.V. Club hailed it as an exciting, captivating episode that skillfully balances answers and new mysteries, keeping viewers engaged and likely to discuss it for years to come. He saw secondary characters such as Lorna Bucket, Strax, Madame Vastra and Jenny Flint contributing to the episode, and Demons Run with its Anglican Marines and Monks adding depth to the setting. He considered Rory's transformation into The Last Centurion to be an intriguing change, adding that River's reveal scene and the emotional weight it brought is beautifully orchestrated and leaves a lasting impression. Dave Golder of SFX felt it "saved" the sixth series and offered "a satisfying slice of fantasy television which ticked lots of boxes: it featured dashing, daring storytelling which was bold and confident; it looked fantastic, there were some hilarious lines and the performance of the star upped his wattage a couple of notches once again". However, he was more critical of the Monks and the direction of the battle at the end. Neela Debnath of The Independent was also favourable, praising the use of the cliffhanger and felt the complicated nature of the episode "draws people more into the show and gets them thinking about it".

Digital Spy's Morgan Jeffery praised the pre-titles sequence, the cast performances, and "a terrific 50 minutes of entertainment". As minor flaws, he felt that Vastra was underdeveloped and that the impact of the Monks was inadequate because "their purpose and origins are never really explained". Similarly, Gavin Fuller of The Daily Telegraph thought that even though the episode was good, there was a lack of significant background motivation for the villains. He also pointed out that the revelation of River being Amy's grown-up child might clash "with a series where loss has often been brushed off as soon as the next couple of episodes". Fuller praised Smith's Doctor, noting the recent shift toward a more serious tone and the authentic portrayal of the Doctor's "awkwardness when discovering the truth about River."

On a less positive side, Dan Martin of The Guardian praised the final reveal and found plenty to love, but stated that he did not feel emotionally connected to the Marines and Lorna due to the fast-paced storytelling. Unlike other reviewers, Martin expressed disappointment in Smith's Doctor, comparing him unfavorably to David Tennant's portrayal. He later rated it the second-to-worst episode of the series, though the finale was not included in the list.

The episode was nominated for the 2012 Hugo Award for Best Dramatic Presentation (Short Form), though it lost to Neil Gaiman's episode "The Doctor's Wife".

Two of the new characters introduced in the episode, Vastra and her assistant Jenny, have proven quite popular among fans, with numerous forums and SFX calling for the BBC to commission a spin-off series. Moffat stated in an interview that he did not have time to work on a spin-off but was open to the possibility of the characters returning. Vastra and Jenny, as well as a revived Strax, were made a recurring part of the seventh series and given a Big Finish audio spin-off series in 2019.
