= Paternoster Gang =

Fictional Doctor Who characters

Paternoster Gang Madame Vastra, Jenny Flint, and Strax
- Doctor Who characters
- From left to right: Vastra, Strax and Jenny Flint, in the 2012 Christmas episode "The Snowmen".
- First appearance: "A Good Man Goes to War" (2011)
- Last appearance: "Deep Breath" (2014)
- Portrayed by: Neve McIntosh (Vastra); Catrin Stewart (Jenny Flint); Dan Starkey (Strax)

In-universe information
- Species: Silurian (Vastra); Human (Jenny Flint); Sontaran (Strax)
- Affiliation: Eleventh Doctor; Twelfth Doctor
- Home: Earth (Vastra and Jenny); Sontar (Strax)
- Home era: Prehistoric (Vastra) (Note: In "The Crimson Horror" (2013), Vastra believes that she has seen the symptoms of the "crimson horror" before, claiming that this had happened about 65 million years before 1893. In "Deep Breath" (2014), she recalls seeing a dinosaur when she was a "little girl".); 19th century (Jenny); 41st century (Strax) (Note: In "A Good Man Goes to War" (2011), the battlefield where Strax is taking care of the wounded is captioned "Battle of Zaruthstra, 4037 A.D.")

Madame Vastra, Jenny Flint, and Strax (informally known as the Paternoster Gang, together with the Doctor) are a trio of recurring fictional characters in the British science fiction television series Doctor Who, created by Steven Moffat and portrayed, respectively, by Neve McIntosh, Catrin Stewart, and Dan Starkey.

The three characters first appear in the sixth series episode "A Good Man Goes to War." Madame Vastra (a Silurian) and Jenny Flint (a human) are a married couple. In later stories, they are depicted living on Paternoster Row in London during the Victorian era. Strax, a Sontaran, is seen in his first appearance to be acting as a nurse, caring for wounded soldiers on another planet as penance for a failure. They are all recruited by the Eleventh Doctor to help him rescue Amy Pond. Despite the success of the effort, Strax apparently dies in the battle. He is, however, shown to be awakened by Vastra and Flint a couple of days later in the webisode "The Battle of Demons Run: Two Days Later"; he then becomes their butler in the 19th century.

Since their first appearance, the trio have appeared various times to help the Doctor; they have a central role in the first half of "The Crimson Horror" (2013). Their last episode was 2014's "Deep Breath", the first episode starring the Twelfth Doctor.

They also have their own spin-off novella, Devil in the Smoke (2012), and spin-off novel, Silhouette (2014), and the trio have appeared in several online "minisodes", with Strax additionally appearing in a series of "Field Report" videos posted to the Doctor Who website. In 2014, they appeared without the Doctor in the Doctor Who Magazine comic strip in the storyline The Crystal Throne (DWM #475–476). Since 2015, an ongoing series of short stories and a comic strip titled Strax and the Time Shark, featuring the three characters, has been a regular feature in Doctor Who Adventures magazine. The three characters became popular with audiences, with the presence of an inter-species same-sex couple also leading to some attention.

== Biography ==
=== Background ===
==== Vastra ====
Vastra is a female Silurian warrior from Mesozoic Earth who was awakened from hibernation in the Victorian era when her lair was disturbed during the construction of the London Underground. Initially enraged, she attempted to avenge her sisters on perfectly innocent tunnel diggers before being pacified by the Doctor. She eventually overcomes her race's general prejudice of humans and joins London society. She becomes a private detective, consulting for Scotland Yard, and likely inspires the Sherlock Holmes stories. Amongst her unseen adventures is her capture of Jack the Ripper, whom she eats (A Good Man Goes to War). She hires a maid, Jenny Flint, who assists her in her investigations; the pair later marry.

==== Jenny Flint ====
Jenny's backstory in "The Battle of Demons Run: Two Days Later" (2013) shows she was turned away from her family because of her "preferences in companionship", and saved from attackers by Vastra, who took her on as an employee. The Doctor was present at their initial meeting, during which, Vastra recounts in "The Name of the Doctor" (2013), he saved Jenny's life. She shows herself to have acquired extremely formidable skills as a hand-to-hand combatant and swordswoman. She is shown in all of her appearances to be entirely comfortable with post-19th century technologies, time travel, and the TARDIS; she is repeatedly seen using technology devices and, in the episode "Deep Breath", wearing and using the Sonic Gauntlet designed for that episode.

==== Strax ====
Commander Strax is a member of an alien warrior race, the Sontarans. Strax was forced to serve as a nurse, healing the injured as punishment for being defeated by the Doctor during the Sontaran invasion of Earth, and is later appointed butler. This is contrary to the Sontaran's warrior instincts and mentality, and as such, he occasionally slips back into his Sontaran ways and mannerisms. In "A Good Man Goes to War", Strax states that he is nearly 12, suggesting that this is quite old for a Sontaran. Running jokes include Strax's inability to tell the difference between genders and his obsession with using violent tactics.

== Appearances ==
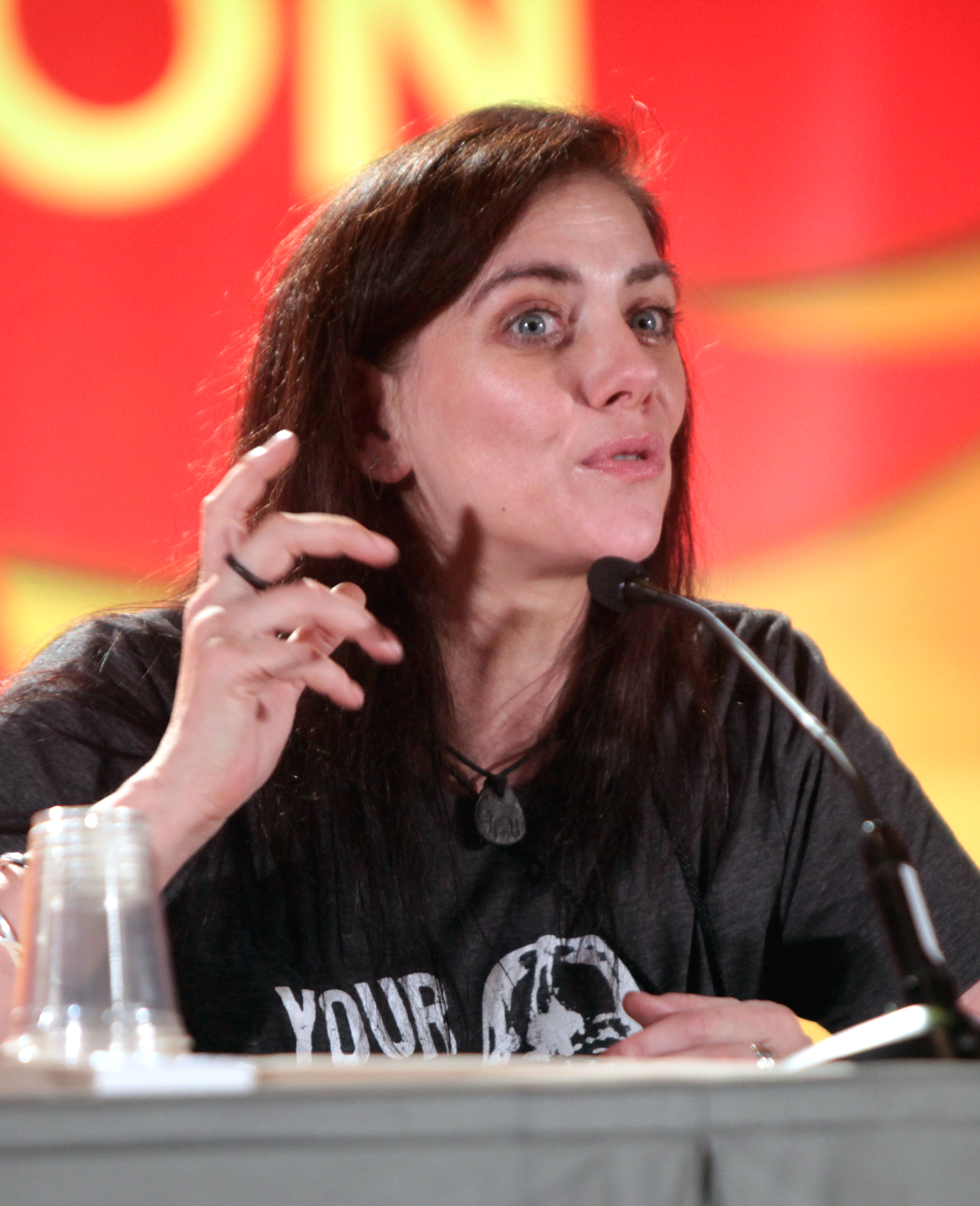
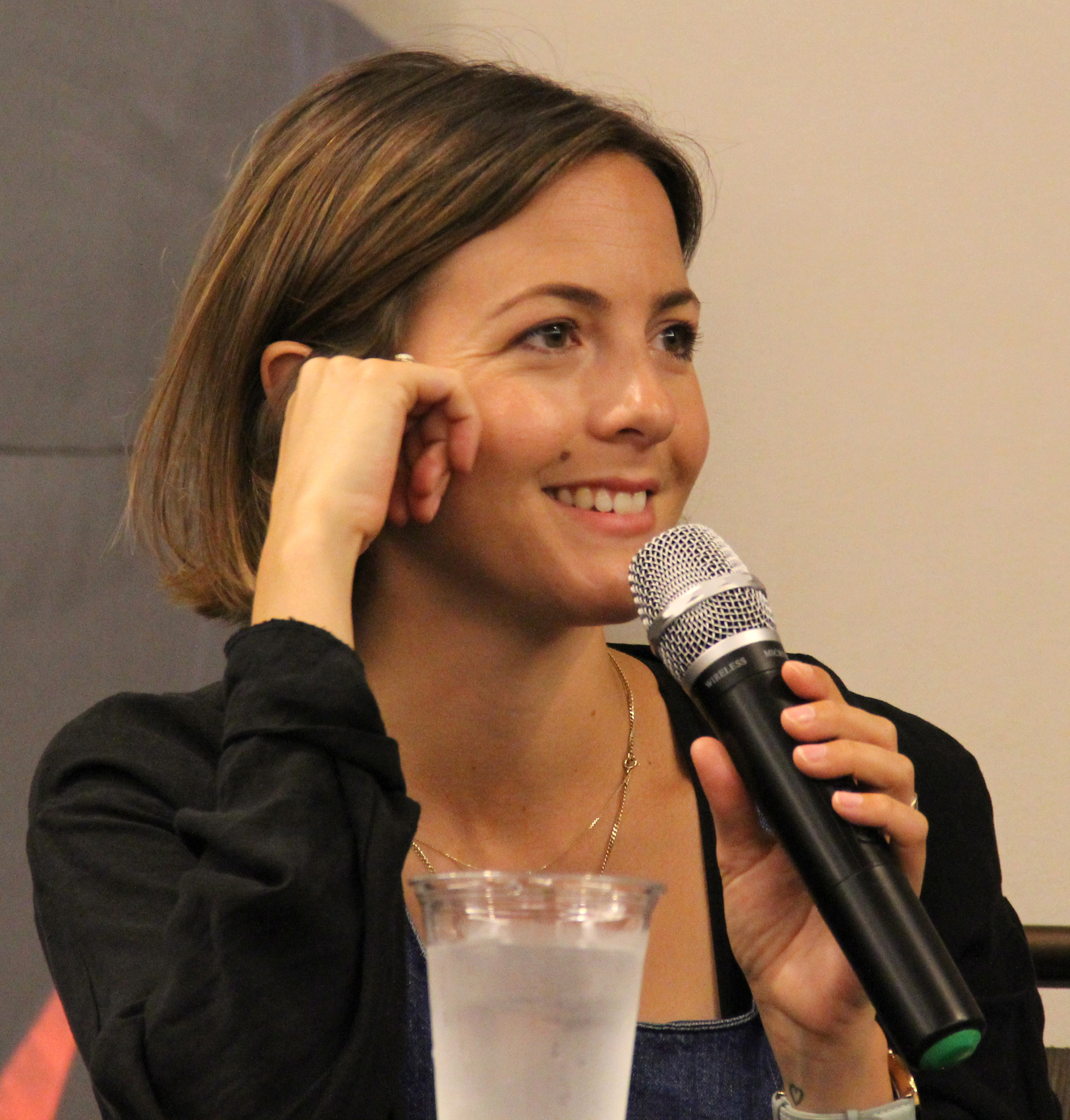
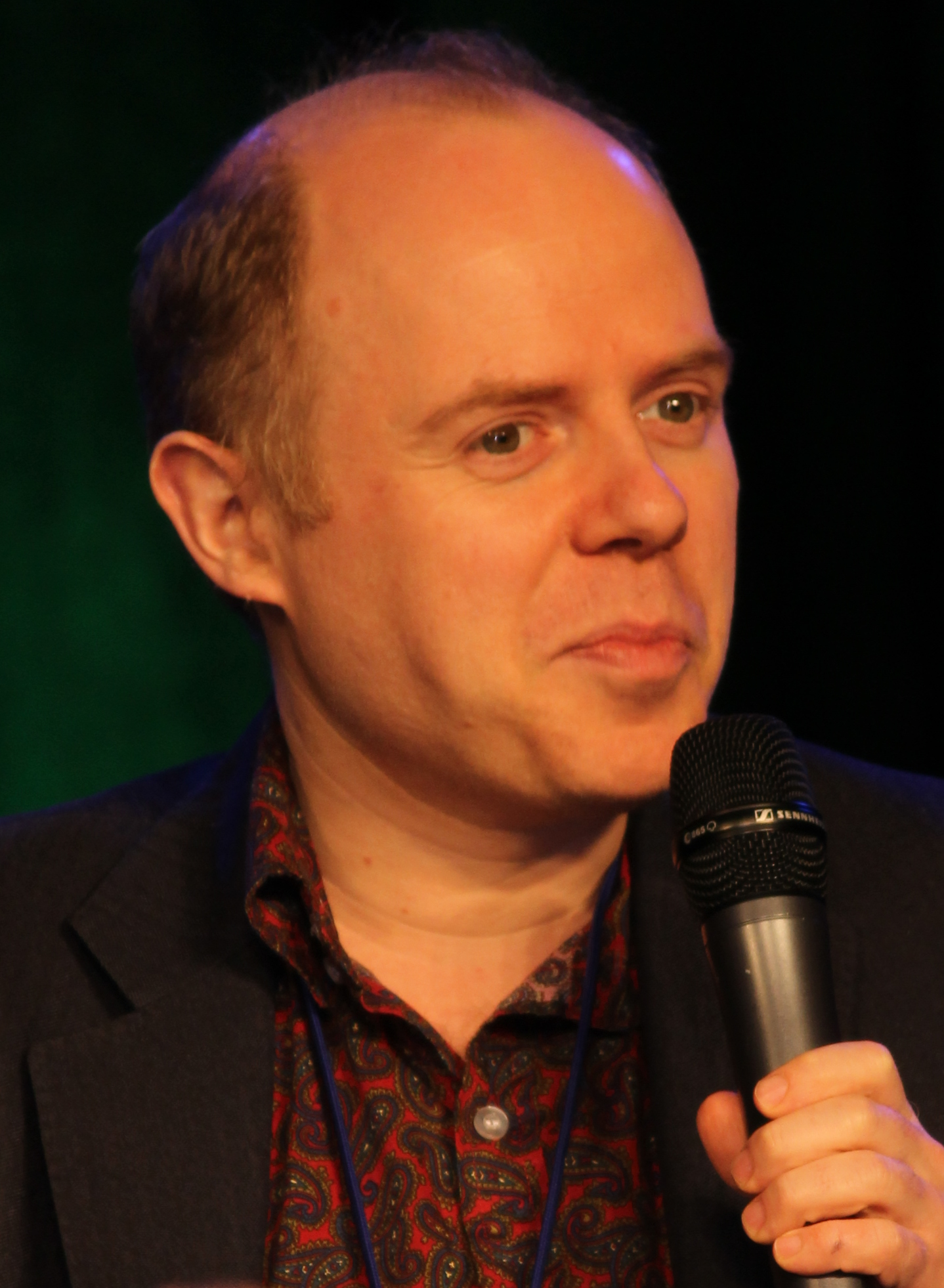
Neve McIntosh, Catrin Stewart and Dan Starkey play Madame Vastra, Jenny Flint and Strax respectively.

=== Television ===
- "A Good Man Goes to War" (2011)
- "The Snowmen" (2012)
- "The Crimson Horror" (2013)
- "The Name of the Doctor" (2013)
- "Deep Breath" (2014)

==== Storylines ====
In their first appearance in "A Good Man Goes to War", the three, along with others who owe him favours, are chosen by the Eleventh Doctor to help him save Amy Pond from Madame Kovarian and the Order of the Headless Monks at Demons Run. At the time, Strax is a Sontaran "nurse" taking care of the wounded soldiers on a battlefield as part of a penance imposed on him. Before he can answer Captain Harcourt as to who came up with this penance, the Doctor arrives in his TARDIS to take him to Demons Run. They fight together against their enemies and succeed in saving Amy, but Strax is mortally wounded and appears to die after saying his last words to Rory Williams.

In "The Battle of Demons Run: Two Days Later", a webcast set two days after the events of "A Good Man Goes to War", Strax is awakened by Vastra and Jenny, after they heal his wounds, and accepts their proposition to join them in London in 1888. He subsequently becomes their butler.

They then appear in "The Snowmen" (2012), trying to convince the Eleventh Doctor to come out of retirement (into which he has retreated after losing Amy and Rory in "The Angels Take Manhattan"). They help the Doctor's future new companion Clara Oswald to find him and support them in their fight against the Great Intelligence. A high fall kills Clara, whose death indirectly lets the Doctor defeat the Great Intelligence.

The trio — and more particularly Jenny — have a central role in the first half of "The Crimson Horror" (2013), set in 1893, in which they investigate a series of strange deaths. They travel to Yorkshire, where Jenny infiltrates a suspect community called Sweetville, led by Mrs Gillyflower. She finds the Eleventh Doctor, kept prisoner in Sweetville, and the trio reunites to help him defeat Mrs Gillyflower, by sabotaging the rocket she was planning to use to poison the skies. They discover that Clara appears to be alive (the Doctor's companion being another version of the one seen in "The Snowmen", coming from another era), but the Doctor does not explain why to Jenny, as he himself does not know the answer at this time.

The three characters reappear in the seventh series finale "The Name of the Doctor", where they organise a meeting in a dream with Clara and River Song. During the "conference call", the three are captured by the Whisper Men, minions of the Great Intelligence, who uses them as bait to bring the Eleventh Doctor to his tomb on the planet Trenzalore. The Doctor unhesitatingly goes to rescue them, recalling their caring and concern for him in "The Snowmen" and feeling a duty towards them. After the Doctor arrives on Trenzalore with Clara, the Great Intelligence scatters itself across the Doctor's timeline to destroy him. As history changes, Jenny disappears and Strax forgets his friendship with Vastra and attacks her, forcing her to defend herself. She points a weapon at him and it glows, but Strax disappears suddenly, leaving Vastra bewildered and calling his name. After Clara enters the timestream to save the Doctor and undo the Great Intelligence's changes to history, Jenny and Strax are restored.

In "Deep Breath", the first episode of the eighth series, Vastra, Jenny, and Strax arrive in central London to witness a dinosaur marching through the city and proceeding to cough up the TARDIS. Upon finding the TARDIS, they find emerging from it a recently regenerated Twelfth Doctor, who falls unconscious. The three, along with Clara, take him back to their home to rest, while they attempt to solve the problem of the dinosaur. However, the Doctor soon wakes up and tries to solve it himself, only to witness the dinosaur spontaneously combust, and Vastra informs the Doctor that there have been similar murders recently. The Doctor vanishes thereafter and Clara becomes a temporary member of the Paternoster Gang, working with them in an effort to locate the Doctor and investigate the dinosaur's death. Together, they find a message in a newspaper directed at Clara, leading to her reunion with the Doctor. The Doctor and Clara go searching for the culprit; when they are about to be killed by robots, the Paternoster Gang rescue them, fighting along with Clara until the Doctor defeats their leader, leading all robots to be deactivated and saving his friends. After the Doctor takes off, leaving Clara in Victorian London, Clara asks Vastra if she can stay with them. Vastra states that she is of course welcome, but she should have no doubt of the Doctor's return. The Doctor then indeed comes back to pick her up, and they leave the house to bring Clara back home.

=== Audio drama ===
The Paternoster Gang is an audio play series from Big Finish Productions. Neve McIntosh, Catrin Stewart & Dan Starkey reprise their roles of Madame Vastra, Jenny Flint, and Strax, respectively. It is executive produced by Jason Haigh-Ellery and Nicholas Briggs. Big Finish announced the series, in November 2018, comprising four volumes and produced in association with BBC Studios.

==== List of audios ====
===== Heritage (2019–2020) =====
No.	Title	Directed by	Written by	Featuring	Released
Volume 1
1	"The Cars That Ate London!"	Ken Bentley	Jonathan Morris	–	June 2019
2	"A Photograph to Remember"	Ken Bentley	Roy Gill	Stonn, Bloomsbury Bunch	June 2019
3	"The Ghosts of Greenwich"	Ken Bentley	Paul Morris	–	June 2019
Volume 2
4	"Dining with Death"	Ken Bentley	Dan Starkey	–	October 2019
5	"The Screaming Ceiling"	Ken Bentley	Guy Adams	Thomas Carnacki	October 2019
6	"Spring-Heeled Jack"	Ken Bentley	Gemma Arrowsmith	Spring-Heeled Jack	October 2019
Volume 3
7	"Family Matters"	Ken Bentley	Lisa McMullin	–	May 2020
8	"Whatever Remains"	Ken Bentley	Robert Valentine	–	May 2020
9	"Truth and Bone"	Ken Bentley	Roy Gill	Stonn, Tom Foster	May 2020
Volume 4
10	"Merry Christmas Mr Jago"	Ken Bentley	Paul Morris	Henry Gordon Jago	October 2020
11	"The Ghost Writers"	Ken Bentley	Roy Gill	–	October 2020
12	"Rulers of Earth"	Ken Bentley	Matt Fitton	–	October 2020

===== Trespassers (2023–2025) =====
No.	Title	Directed by	Written by	Featuring	Released
Volume 1: Rogues Gallery
1	"The Ghost and the Potato Man"	Ken Bentley	Barnaby Kay	–	October 2023
2	"Symmetry of Death"	Ken Bentley	Dan Starkey	–	October 2023
3	"Till Death Us Do Part"	Ken Bentley	Lisa McMullin	Eighth Doctor	October 2023
Volume 2: The Casebook of Paternoster Row
4	"Anne of a Thousand Light Years"	Ken Bentley	James Kettle	Fourth Doctor	April 2024
5	"Pater Noster"	Ken Bentley	Gary Russell	–	April 2024
6	"The Gentlemen Thieves"	Ken Bentley	Lauren Mooney, Stewart Pringle	–	April 2024
Volume 3: No Place Like Home
7	"Doppelgängers"	Ken Bentley	Ken Bentley	-	December 2024
8	"Jellyfish!"	Ken Bentley	Neve McIntosh, Dan Starkey	-	December 2024
9	"The Houseguest"	Ken Bentley	Matt Fitton	Second Doctor	December 2024
Volume 4: Last Stand
10	"I Married a Zygon"	Ken Bentley	Alan Ronald	-	March 2025
11	"A Passion for Fashion"	Ken Bentley	Helen Goldwyn	-	March 2025
12	"The Final Problem"	Ken Bentley	Lauren Mooney & Stewart Pringle	Eighth Doctor	March 2025

===== The Misplaced World (2026) =====
No.	Title	Directed by	Written by	Featuring	Released
–	"The Misplaced World"	Ken Bentley	Neve McIntosh and Dan Starkey	Eighth Doctor	December 2026

== Casting and development ==
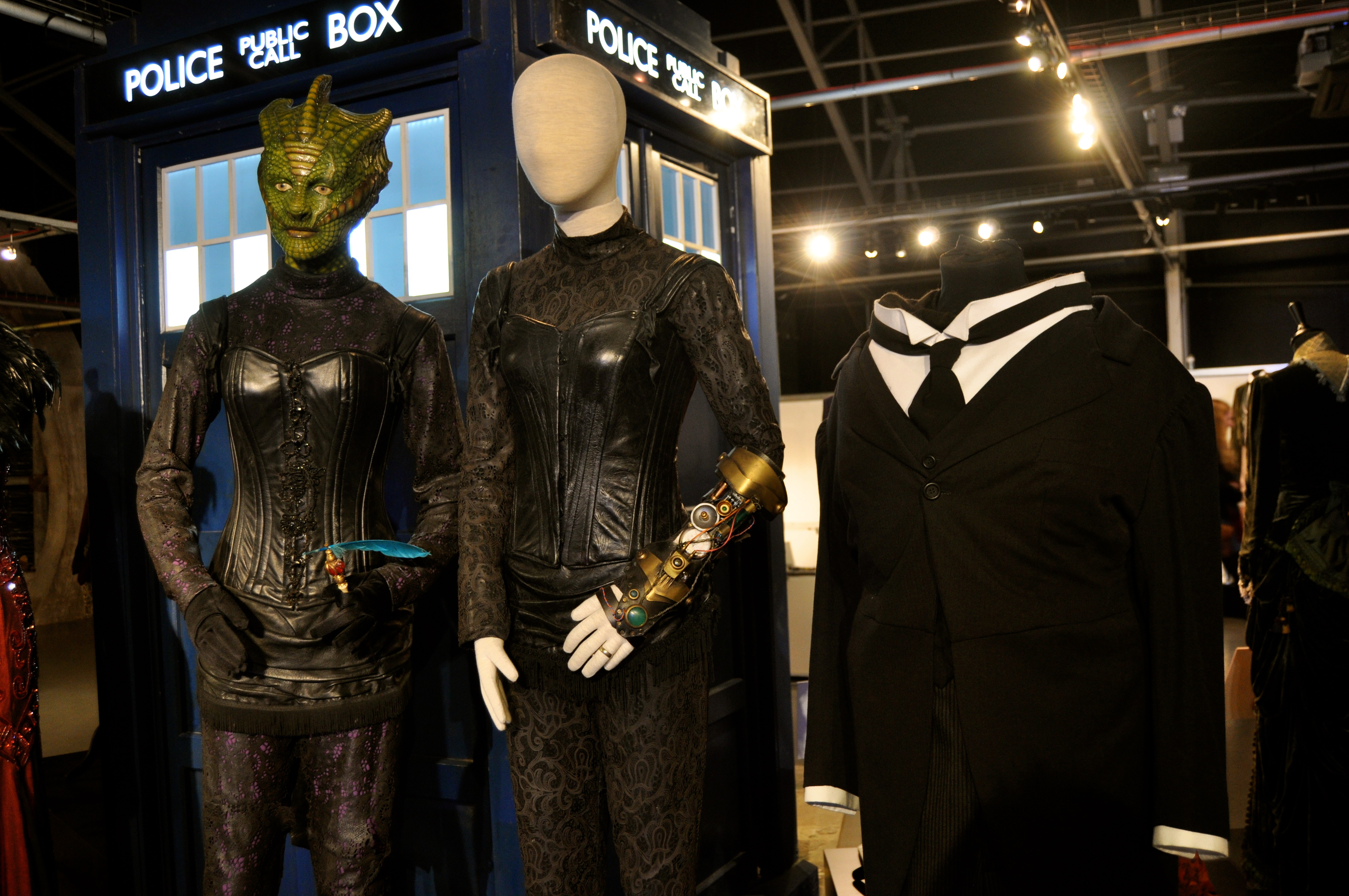
The costumes of Madame Vastra, Jenny, and Strax, on display at the Doctor Who Experience.

McIntosh previously appeared in the series portraying two other Silurian female characters, sisters Alaya and Restac, in the two-part story "The Hungry Earth"/"Cold Blood" (2010).

Starkey previously played Commander Skorr, one of the Sontarans, in the two-part story re-introducing the species, "The Sontaran Stratagem"/"The Poison Sky" (2008). He also portrayed another Sontaran character in "The End of Time" (2009–10) and in between appearances as Strax in "The Name of the Doctor" (2013) and "Deep Breath" (2014), he played two more Sontarans in "The Time of the Doctor" (2013).

In November 2013, the long-running children's show Blue Peter announced a competition for fans aged 6–15 to design 'sonic devices' for the characters, with the three winning designs appearing in Series 8. The following month the winning entries were revealed as a Sonic Hatpin, Sonic Gauntlet, and Sonic Lorgnette for Vastra, Jenny, and Strax respectively. The devices were featured in "Deep Breath".

In an interview in the Doctor Who Magazine issue dated April 2015, Steven Moffat said that the BBC suggested a spin-off series about the characters, but he rejected the idea due to his other commitments.

== Reception ==
=== Critical reception ===
The three characters have met with positive reviews from critics who praised their chemistry, as well as the humour concerning Strax and his Sontaran warrior habits, often at odds with the context. Nick Setchfield of SFX called Strax "just the right side of crowdpleasing." Discussing their first appearance in "A Good Man Goes to War", Dan Martin from The Guardian called the three "the finest thing about it, lighting up the screen with every appearance." He called their return in "The Snowmen" wonderful, calling Strax "scene-stealingly adorable". He also stated "with marriage equality so much on the agenda, the divine Vastra and Jenny can only be a good thing to have on screens at tea time."
