= Dan Starkey (actor) =

English actor (born 1977)

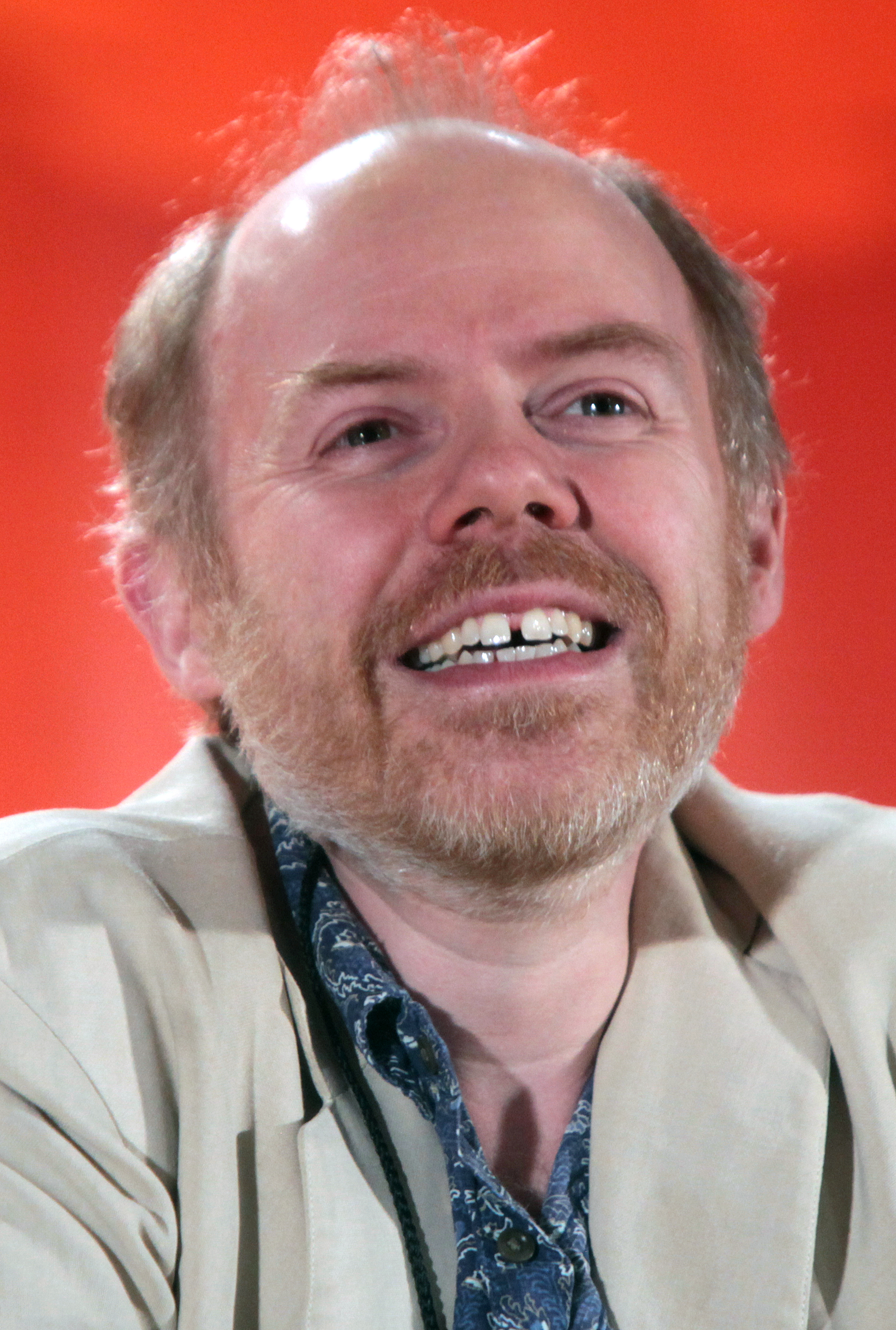
- Starkey at the 2016 Phoenix Comicon Fan Fest
- Born: 27 September 1977 (age 48)
- Education: Bristol Old Vic
- Occupation: Actor
- Years active: 2004–present

Dan Starkey (born 27 September 1977) is an English actor. He has appeared on the BBC One science-fiction TV series Doctor Who as a number of different Sontaran characters, most notably Strax during the Eleventh and Twelfth incarnations of the Doctor. In 2016, he joined the CBBC sketch show, Class Dismissed and has appeared in 36 episodes (every episode of Series 1, 2 & 3). He left the show after Series 3.

== Early life ==
Dan Starkey was born on 27 September 1977. Starkey studied at Trinity Hall, Cambridge and graduated in Anglo-Saxon, Norse and Celtic before training at the Bristol Old Vic (graduating in 2006).

== Career ==
He played the enraged loner Simon in Muswell Hill by Torben Betts at Richmond's Orange Tree Theatre (Feb/March 2012) and was nominated for the 2012 Offie for Best Male Performance. In November 2013 Starkey appeared in the one-off 50th anniversary comedy homage The Five(ish) Doctors Reboot.

== University Challenge ==
On 2 January 2015, Starkey was a member of the winning team on Christmas University Challenge, representing Trinity Hall, Cambridge who defeated Balliol College, Oxford, the University of Edinburgh and the University of Hull. His team-mates were international rower Tom James, world champion cyclist Emma Pooley and novelist Adam Mars-Jones.

== Filmography ==
=== Film ===
Year	Title	Role	Notes
2004	Fix	Drifter	Short film
2015	Alex the Vampire	Dan	
2018	Sherlock Gnomes	Teddy Gregson	Voice
2023	Mummies	Danny and Dennys	Voice

=== Television ===
Year	Title	Role	Notes
2008–21	Doctor Who	Various	13 episodes
2011	The Sarah Jane Adventures	Plark	The Man Who Never Was
2012–14	Wizards vs Aliens	Randal Moon	Series Regular
2012	Casualty	Wally St Clare	"Sixteen Candles"
2013	The Five(ish) Doctors Reboot	Himself	
2015	Inside No. 9	Blue Demon Dwarf	"Séance Time"
2015	Catherine Tate's Nan	Ian	Episode: "Nanger Management"
2016–2018	Class Dismissed	Various	36 episodes
2019	Good Omens	Passerby	Episode: "Saturday Morning Funtime"
2019	Years and Years	Mr. Briscoe	Episode 5
2019, 2023	Brassic	Glen Glenson	2 Episodes

=== Video games ===
Year	Title	Role	Notes
2011	Doctor Who: The Adventure Games	Field Major Kaarsh; various Sontarans	"The Gunpowder Plot"
2015	Lego Dimensions	Strax	
2022	Warhammer 40,000: Darktide	The Seer	

== Theatre credits ==
- Notes from Underground, The Arcola, 2007.
- The 39 Steps, UK national tour
- The Fitzrovia Radio Hour
- Muswell Hill by Torben Betts, Orange Tree Theatre, Richmond
- Making News by Robert Khan and Tom Salinsky, Pleasance One Theatre, Edinburgh Fringe Festival

== CD audio dramas ==
Year	Title	Role
2011	Robophobia	Cravnet
2011	Hexagora	Lord Zellenger
2011	The Five Companions	The Sontarans
2012	The Foe from the Future	Historiographer Osin
2012	Wirrn Isle	Sheer Jawn
2012	Energy of the Daleks	Kevin Winston, Robomen
2012	The First Sontarans	Jaka
2013	Starlight Robbery	Marshall Stenn, Major Vlaar, Sergeant Gredd, Asallis
2014	The King of Sontar	Strang, Hutchins
2015	Terror of the Sontarans	Field-Major Kayste, Skegg, Stodd
2018	The Coming of the Martians	Ogilvy
2024	Doctor Who: Rogue (Novelisation)	Reader
