= Asylum of the Daleks =

226 – "Asylum of the Daleks"
- Doctor Who episode
- Promotional poster

Cast
- Doctor: Matt Smith – Eleventh Doctor
- Companions: Karen Gillan – Amy Pond; Arthur Darvill – Rory Williams
- Others: Jenna-Louise Coleman – Oswin; Anamaria Marinca – Darla von Karlsen; David Gyasi – Harvey; Naomi Ryan – Cassandra; Nicholas Briggs – Voice of the Daleks; Barnaby Edwards – Dalek 1; Nicholas Pegg – Dalek 2

Production
- Directed by: Nick Hurran
- Written by: Steven Moffat
- Produced by: Marcus Wilson
- Executive producers: Steven Moffat; Caroline Skinner
- Music by: Murray Gold
- Series: Series 7
- Running time: 50 minutes
- First broadcast: 1 September 2012

Chronology
← Preceded by "The Doctor, the Widow and the Wardrobe"	Followed by → "Dinosaurs on a Spaceship"

"Asylum of the Daleks" is the first episode of the seventh series of the British science fiction television programme Doctor Who, broadcast on BBC One on 1 September 2012. It was written by executive producer Steven Moffat and directed by Nick Hurran.

The episode features the alien time traveller the Doctor (Matt Smith) being captured by the Daleks, along with his companions Amy (Karen Gillan) and Rory (Arthur Darvill), who are about to divorce. They are sent by the Daleks to the Asylum, a planet where insane Daleks are exiled, to enable the Asylum to be destroyed before the insane Daleks can escape. The Doctor is helped along the way by Oswin (Jenna-Louise Coleman), a woman whose spaceship had crashed on the planet a year ago and has been trapped there since then.

"Asylum of the Daleks" incorporates many of the different varieties of Daleks seen throughout the programme's 50-year history, and was intended to make the Daleks scary again. Coleman makes her first appearance in Doctor Who in this episode, before returning as the Doctor's new companion in the 2012 Christmas special; her appearance was successfully kept a secret from the general public prior to the episode's broadcast, as her casting as the new companion had already been announced. The episode was watched by 8.33 million viewers in the UK, and received attention on BBC iPlayer and international broadcasts. Critical reception was positive, with some critics questioning the circumstances behind Amy and Rory's breakup.

== Plot ==
=== Prequels ===
A prequel was released to iTunes on 1 September 2012, and to Zune and Amazon Video on 2 September 2012. In the prequel, a hooded messenger informs the Eleventh Doctor that a woman, Darla von Karlsen, requests his help for her daughter. The messenger provides space-time coordinates to the planet Skaro, home planet of the Daleks.

In addition, Pond Life is an earlier five-part mini serial prequel to this episode, which was released serially in the week leading up to the premiere. The fifth part hints at Amy and Rory's separation.

=== Synopsis ===
The Doctor, having been led into a trap by Darla, is kidnapped by the Daleks and taken to the Parliament of the Daleks. Joined by him are nearly-divorced Amy and Rory, who have been similarly kidnapped from present-day Earth. The Doctor is surprised when the Daleks ask him for help. The Alaska, a starliner that crashed into a planet housing insane, battle-scarred Daleks called the Asylum, has ruptured the planet's force field, thus risking escape of the insane Daleks. To prevent this, the Parliament wishes to destroy the planet remotely, but the force field is still too strong to allow that. The Daleks task the Doctor, Amy and Rory with deactivating the force field from the planet. After arriving, the Doctor, surmising that the Daleks will destroy the planet as soon as he deactivates the force field, plots an escape via a nearby teleporter which will transport them to the Dalek ship. Oswin, a surviving crew member of the Alaska, agrees to deactivate the force field in return for the Doctor coming to rescue her. Meanwhile, Rory and Amy reconcile their marriage with Amy revealing she let Rory go when she learned that her captivity at Demon's Run rendered her unable to have children.

The Doctor makes his way to Oswin, venturing through a section that holds Daleks who survived encounters with him. Oswin saves the Doctor from these Daleks by removing any memories of him from the Daleks' collective telepathically-shared knowledge. The Doctor enters Oswin's chamber and discovers to his horror that she is a Dalek. Oswin is revealed to have been captured by Daleks after the Alaska crashed on the Asylum and, to preserve her genius-level intellect for Dalek use, was turned into a Dalek. Unable to cope with her conversion, her mind retreated into a fantasy of survival as a human. Oswin fulfils her promise of deactivating the force field, making her final request that the Doctor remember her as the human she once was. The Doctor returns to Amy and Rory, and they teleport back to the TARDIS just as the planet is destroyed. The Daleks fail to recognise the Doctor, revealing the magnitude of Oswin's removal of the Doctor from the Dalek hive intelligence. The Doctor returns Amy and Rory home, where Rory moves back in with Amy.

=== Continuity ===
Some of the Daleks are survivors of previous encounters with the Doctor on Spiridon (Planet of the Daleks, 1973), Kembel (The Daleks' Master Plan, 1965–66), Aridius (The Chase, 1965), Vulcan (The Power of the Daleks, 1966), and Exxilon (Death to the Daleks, 1974). The Special Weapons Dalek, introduced in Remembrance of the Daleks (1988), appears in a cameo. In her opening speech, Darla refers to the Doctor faking his death in the 2011 episodes "The Impossible Astronaut" and "The Wedding of River Song". The concept of nanogenes – microscopic machines – is mentioned in the two-parter "The Empty Child"/"The Doctor Dances" (2005), also written by Moffat. In the closing exchange in the Parliament, the Doctor refers to one of his nicknames as "The Oncoming Storm", first mentioned in the episode "The Parting of the Ways" (2005). The final question of "Doctor who?", besides being a callback to the programme's title, is the "question that must never be answered" that Dorium asks at the end of "The Wedding of River Song".

== Production ==
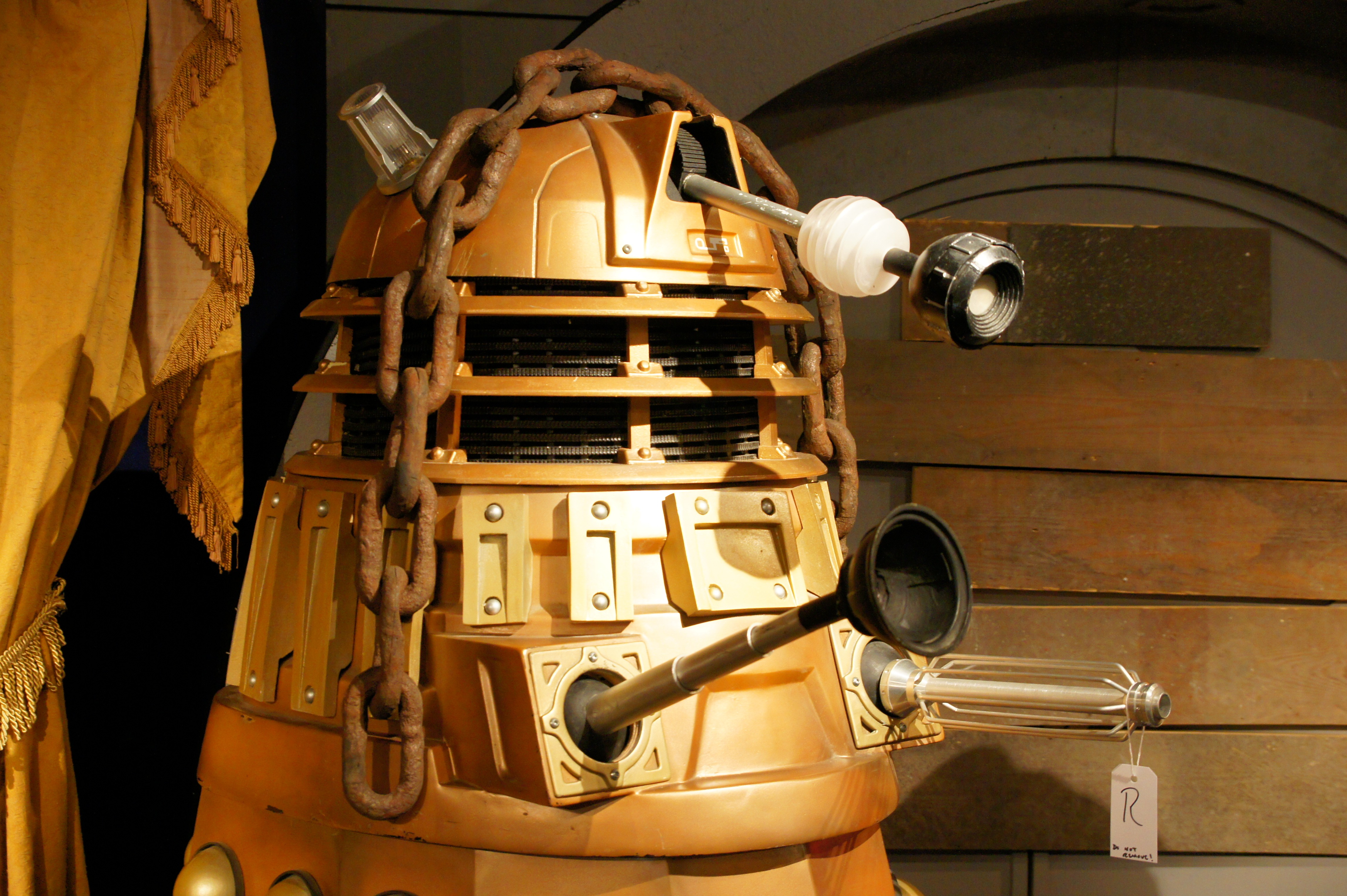
The Dalek holding Oswin, on display at the Doctor Who Experience

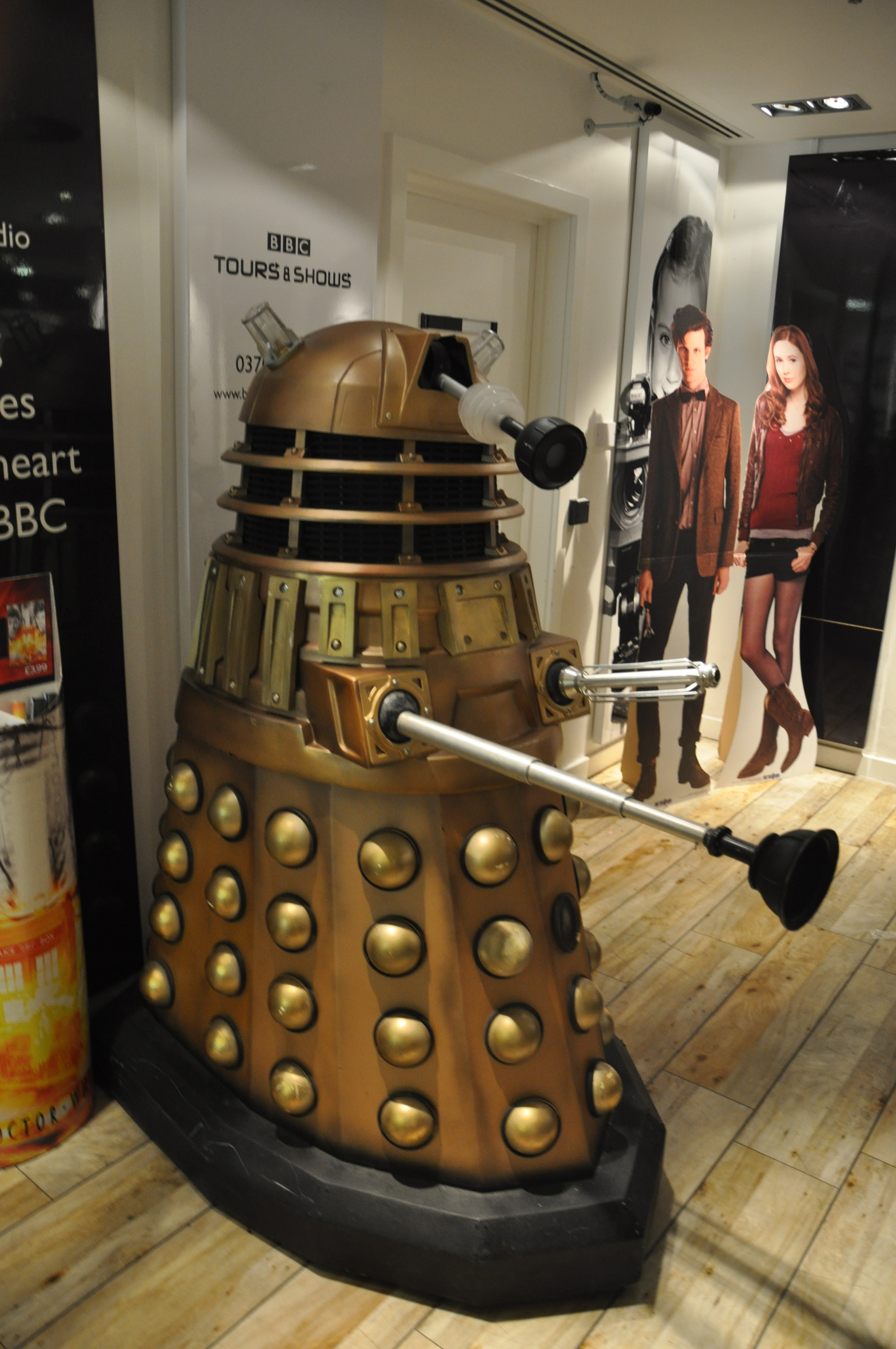
One of the variations of Daleks from the programme's 50-year history featured in "Asylum of the Daleks"

Executive producer Steven Moffat announced in 2011 that he intended to give a "rest" to the Daleks. The reason for the rest was that Moffat felt their frequent appearances made them the "most reliably defeatable enemies in the universe". Moffat recalled that the Daleks were remembered for being scary, but due to their legacy as British icons they had become "cuddly" over the years and their true menace forgotten; with "Asylum" he intended to make them scary again, reminding the audience of their intentions. He thought the best way to do this would be to show Daleks that were considered even madder than usual. Actor Karen Gillan admitted that she had not been scared of the Daleks before working on the episode. It is also the first Dalek story Moffat has written for the show; he stated that he "couldn't resist" the opportunity.

In March 2012, it was announced that Jenna-Louise Coleman would replace Gillan and Arthur Darvill as the next companion, first appearing in the 2012 Christmas special. It was Moffat's idea to have her appear in "Asylum of the Daleks" as the character of Oswin; it was not originally planned, and Coleman assumed it was part of her audition at first to see which character fitted her best. He intended to keep her appearance a secret, and thanked the press and fans that it was not leaked. Coleman's scenes were filmed over six days on a closed set with a green screen which she acted to. Whether her later character was the same as Oswin was not confirmed at the time, but her appearance in "The Snowmen" makes it clear that there is a connection. Coleman played each version of the character as individuals with "trust that there would be a payoff" to her mystery.

"Asylum of the Daleks" was directed by Nick Hurran, who directed "The Girl Who Waited" and "The God Complex" of the previous series, as well as the fifth episode of the seventh series. "Asylum of the Daleks" contains many of the Dalek types that the Doctor has faced over the years, including the Special Weapons Dalek from the 1988 story Remembrance of the Daleks. According to The Daily Telegraph, the production team located the remaining models of the various versions of the Daleks and shipped them to the studios in Cardiff Bay. This included a Dalek owned by Russell T Davies, Moffat's predecessor. Executive producer Caroline Skinner knew Davies well and asked to borrow his replica. She stated that he was "thrilled" that it was canonised. The total number of different Daleks was around 25, with models from 1963 to 2010; Skinner said that "there was just a real magic and sense of history about having them". Moffat was concerned about how all the different Daleks would look together, but was pleased once he saw them; he commented that the diversity made them look like a species, rather than identical robots. Many of the props were built from scratch. The snow scenes on the asylum planet were filmed in Spain during the production of "A Town Called Mercy". Music featured in the episode are the "Habanera" from the Georges Bizet opera Carmen, which is used diegetically, and "Feel the Love" by Rudimental is also featured. The Doctor Who logo in the title sequence featured the texture of a Dalek, in keeping with the varied "blockbuster" themes for each of the opening titles of the first half of the series.

== Broadcast and reception ==
"Asylum of the Daleks" was preview screened at BFI Southbank on 14 August 2012, and at the MediaGuardian Edinburgh International Television Festival during 23–25 August. On 25 August it was also screened in New York City and Toronto. The episode was broadcast to the public on 1 September on BBC One in the United Kingdom, BBC America in the United States, and on Space in Canada, and on 2 September on the ABC iView service. It premiered on 8 September 2012 on ABC1 in Australia, and on 13 September on Prime TV in New Zealand.

Overnight viewing figures for the UK showed that the episode was watched by 6.4 million viewers, the lowest overnight figure for a premiere episode of the revived series; however, viewing patterns indicate that fewer people watch Doctor Who live, and it won its timeslot. The final consolidated rating was 8.33 million viewers, ranking third for the week on BBC One. It was also the most-viewed episode on BBC's online iPlayer the day that it aired, and ended September in the number one spot, with 2.2 million requests. "Asylum of the Daleks" achieved an Appreciation Index of 89, the highest for a series opener of Doctor Who.

Viewing figures in the US on BBC America showed that the episode was watched by 1.555 million viewers. It was the #1 cable program in its timeslot, and the most watched telecast in the history of the network. The episode also garnered a 0.6 rating in the 18–49 demographic. "Asylum of the Daleks" also was viewed 75,000 times on ABC's iView in Australia, a record audience, and 620,000 watched the premiere on Space in Canada, Doctor Who's second-best ratings for the channel. On Prime in New Zealand, the episode attracted 171,690 viewers, Doctor Who's second-highest rating on the channel and the highest rated show on the channel that day.

=== Critical reception ===
"Asylum of the Daleks" received positive reviews from critics. Dan Martin of The Guardian praised Moffat's "script packed with ace curveballs and zappy dialogue" and Nick Hurran's direction. Martin also notes that "more happened in the opening episode than has been covered in most recent two-parters – and events were also dealt with in a lot more depth." He also was pleased that the asylum setting could explore the Daleks while making it reminiscent of the classic series. The Daily Telegraph reviewer Gavin Fuller gave it four out of five stars, describing it as a "confident opener" and highlighting the concept and set design of the asylum. He particularly praised Coleman, whom he called "the star of the episode". Michael Hogan, also writing for The Telegraph, gave "Asylum of the Daleks" a slightly higher rating of four and a half stars out of five, also commending Coleman as well as many details of the script.

Neela Debnath of The Independent commented positively on the show's continuing exploration of the Daleks and the more "adult tone", praising the performance of the three leads. Radio Times writer Patrick Mulkern stated that it "ticks all [his] boxes as a Doctor Who fan of more than 40 years standing", describing it as "clever, fast, funny, eerie, surprising and tearjerking". Nick Setchfield of SFX gave the episode five out of five stars, calling it a "strong, cinematically-minded series opener" which succeeded in making the Daleks scary. He also praised Coleman's debut, Matt Smith's performance, the special effects, and Amy and Rory's emotional subplot. io9 reviewer Charlie Jane Anders noted that the plot "is mostly just an excuse to explore the Doctor's ongoing relationship with the Daleks, and to show how sad it's gotten". Both Anders and Mulkern (the latter citing a Doctor Who veteran, Katy Manning) noted that Oswin's fascination with eggs, required for making soufflés, is really just a mental trick to block out the "exterminate" ("egg-stir-minate") conditioning; this literary device is woven throughout the episode as a series of subtle hints, as Rory is confused by a dormant Dalek, initially misinterpreting him as saying "eggs".

Digital Spy's Morgan Jeffery also awarded it five stars, though he felt Amy and Rory's breakup was "a little difficult to buy" as it was resolved quickly, even if the situation was "sensitively handled" and "deftly performed". Keith Phipps of The A.V. Club graded "Asylum of the Daleks" as a "B+", also writing that he had a "quibble" with the Ponds' marriage issue as it had not been foreshadowed, but ultimately felt that the episode "gets the season off to a great start while creating a sense that anything could happen". IGN's Matt Risley rated the episode as 8.5 out of 10, finding that the "only downside" was that "it felt less a tale about the Daleks than an adventure that just happened to have them in it". Maureen Ryan, writing for The Huffington Post, felt it was a "ripping start to the season" that redeemed the Daleks from "Victory of the Daleks". While she commended Gillan and Darvill's acting during Amy and Rory's emotional confrontation, she noted that they were not a couple that would break up because of infertility.

The episode was nominated for the 2013 Hugo Award for Best Dramatic Presentation (Short Form), alongside "The Angels Take Manhattan" and "The Snowmen".
