= Jackdaw (film) =

British film by Jamie Childs

- Film poster
- Directed by: Jamie Childs
- Written by: Jamie Childs
- Produced by: Sebastien Raybaud; Callum Grant; Kate Glover; Jamie Childs
- Starring: Oliver Jackson-Cohen; Jenna Coleman; Thomas Turgoose; Rory McCann
- Cinematography: Will Baldy
- Edited by: David Fisher
- Music by: Deadly Avenger; Si Begg
- Production companies: Anton; North East Screen; Never / Sleep Pictures
- Distributed by: Vertigo Releasing
- Release dates: September 22, 2023 (Fantastic Fest); January 26, 2024 (United Kingdom)
- Running time: 97 minutes
- Country: United Kingdom
- Language: English

Jackdaw is a 2023 British action thriller film starring Oliver Jackson-Cohen, Jenna Coleman, Thomas Turgoose, and Rory McCann. It was written and directed by Jamie Childs, in his feature film debut. The film premiered at Fantastic Fest on 22 September 2023, and was released in the United Kingdom on 26 January 2024.

== Synopsis ==
Set in Hartlepool in the North-East of England, over the course of a single night. The film follows a former motocross champion and army veteran who has fallen on hard times (Jackson-Cohen). He accepts a job to collect a package in the North Sea but this decision could have big ramifications for his family.

== Cast ==
- Oliver Jackson-Cohen as Jack
- Jenna Coleman as Bo
- Thomas Turgoose as Craig
- Rory McCann as Armstrong
- Allan Mustafa
- Vivienne Acheampong
- Joe Blakemore as Silas
- Leon Harrop as Simon
- Austin Haynes

== Production ==
The film was produced by Anton's CEO Sebastien Raybaud alongside Callum Grant, Kate Glover and writer-director Jamie Childs. William Baldy is cinematographer.

=== Filming ===
Principal photography took place on location in Hartlepool in February 2023. Director Jamie Childs grew up in County Durham and has discussed his desire to showcase the north-east area in his filmmaking. Filming locations also include Tees Valley, around Seal Sands, Nunthorpe, Redcar and the North Sea.

== Release ==
The world premiere of Jackdaw took place at Fantastic Fest in Austin, Texas in September 2023. The film held its UK premiere at Showcase Cinema de Lux in Stockton-on-Tees on 24 January 2024. It was released in cinemas in the United Kingdom on 26 January 2024.

== Reception ==
On the review aggregator website Rotten Tomatoes, 71% of 17 critics' reviews are positive, with an average rating of 6.1/10.
