= Jenna Coleman =

English actress (born 1986)

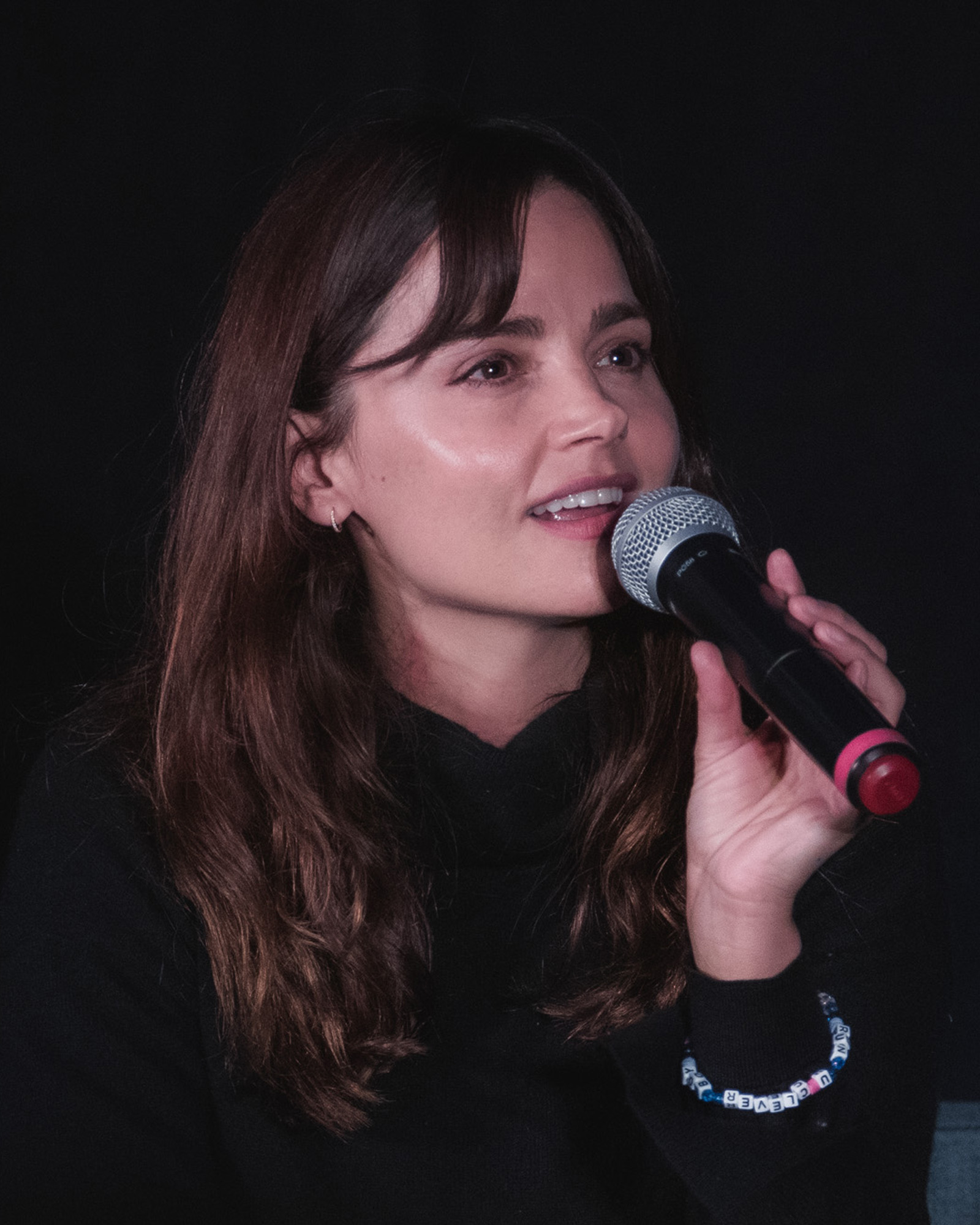
- Coleman in 2025
- Born: Jenna-Louise Coleman; 27 April 1986 (age 40); Blackpool, Lancashire, England
- Occupation: Actress
- Years active: 1996–present
- Partners: Richard Madden (2011–2015); Tom Hughes (2016–2020); Jamie Childs (2020–present)
- Children: 1

Jenna-Louise Coleman (born 27 April 1986) is an English actress. She is best known for her roles as Jasmine Thomas in Emmerdale (2005–2009), Clara Oswald in Doctor Who (2012–2015, 2017) and Queen Victoria in Victoria (2016–2019). She has received accolades including nominations for an International Emmy Award, as well as for the BAFTA Cymru and BAFTA Scotland Awards.

She made her film debut with a small role in the American superhero film Captain America: The First Avenger (2011), and made appearances on diverse British period miniseries, including Titanic (2012) and Death Comes to Pemberley (2013). Coleman led the crime miniseries The Cry (2018), The Serpent (2021) and The Jetty (2024). She portrayed Johanna Constantine in the Netflix fantasy drama series The Sandman (2022–2025). Coleman's other film appearances include Neil Maskell's dark comedy Klokkenluider (2022), and Jamie Childs' thriller Jackdaw (2023).

On stage, Coleman appeared as Ann Deever in the 2019 revival of Arthur Miller's All My Sons. She made her West End debut starring in the 2023's revival of Sam Steiner's Lemons Lemons Lemons Lemons Lemons, alongside Aidan Turner. Coleman has voiced video game characters, including Melia Antiqua in the Xenoblade franchise.

== Early life and education ==
Jenna-Louise Coleman was born in Blackpool on 27 April 1986, the daughter of Karen and Keith Coleman. Her father is a joiner and fitter of bar and restaurant interiors. She has an older brother, also a joiner. Coleman is of English, Scottish, Welsh and Irish ancestry. Her grandmother named her after the character of Jenna Wade from the American TV series Dallas.

She attended Arnold School in Blackpool, where she was head girl. At age 10, she performed in a professional production of Summer Holiday at the Blackpool Opera House. At age 13, she performed in a production of Snow White at the Blackpool Opera House with the Sue Turner Fylde Theatre Group. While at school, she was a member of the theatre company In Yer Space, with whom she performed in the play Crystal Clear at the Edinburgh Festival. She won an award for her performance, and the play was received favourably. She was offered a place to study English at the University of York, but turned it down in order to accept the role of Jasmine Thomas in the soap opera Emmerdale.

== Career ==
=== 2005–2012: Early career ===
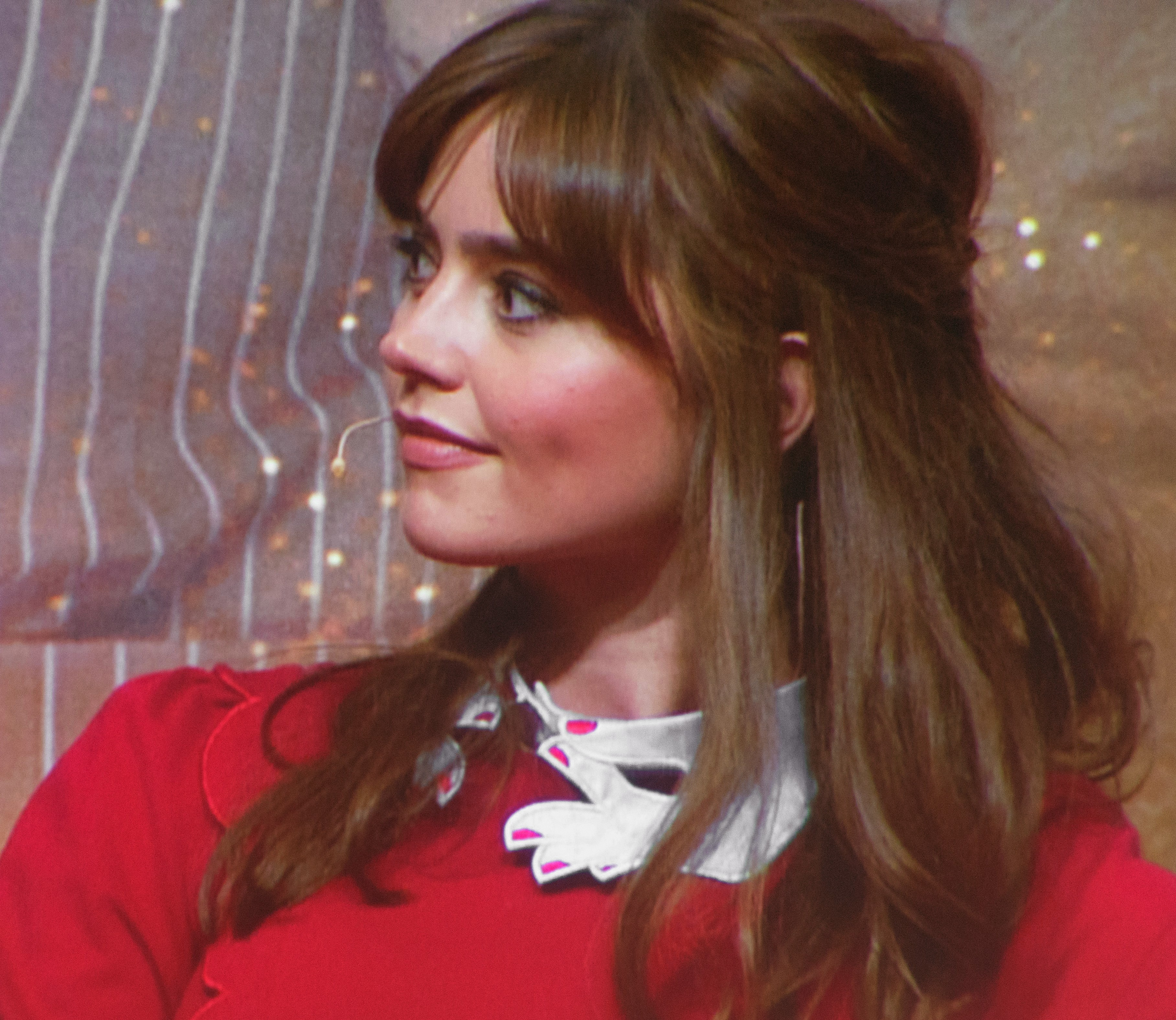
Coleman in November 2013

Coleman landed the part of Jasmine Thomas in Emmerdale in 2005. At the British Soap Awards 2007, she was nominated for the "Best Newcomer" award, and at the National Television Awards 2006, she was nominated for the "Most Popular Newcomer" award. At the 2009 British Soap Awards, she was nominated for the "Best Actress", "Sexiest Female", and "Best Dramatic Performance" awards. She received a nomination for the "Best Actress" award from the TV Choice Awards. In May 2009, it was announced that Coleman would be joining BBC school-based drama series Waterloo Road, as "hard girl" Lindsay James. As she was 23 at the time of her casting, Coleman found the experience of playing a schoolgirl "surreal".

After the show ended, Coleman went six months without acting work, and at one point applied to RADA, which was unsuccessful. She moved to Los Angeles, to try her luck, and spent her days going to auditions. In 2011, she made her feature film debut with a small role in Captain America: The First Avenger. Coleman went back to England after being called for the role of Annie Desmond, in Julian Fellowes' four part mini-series Titanic. She described her character as a "cheeky little Cockney" and "the Eliza Doolittle of the ship".

In December 2010, it was announced that Coleman would be playing Susan Brown in a BBC Four television adaptation of the John Braine novel Room at the Top. The adaptation was originally intended to air in April 2011, but this was cancelled due to a rights dispute between the production company and Braine's estate. The dispute was resolved by 2012, and the show aired in two parts on 26 and 27 September 2012. That same year, Coleman was cast as Rosie in Stephen Poliakoff's original drama series Dancing on the Edge, which follows the fortunes of a black jazz band in the 1930s. The show aired on BBC Two in February 2013. She also starred as Lydia Wickham in the adaptation of Death Comes to Pemberley. The three episodes were shown on BBC One during Christmas 2013.

=== 2012–2017: Doctor Who ===
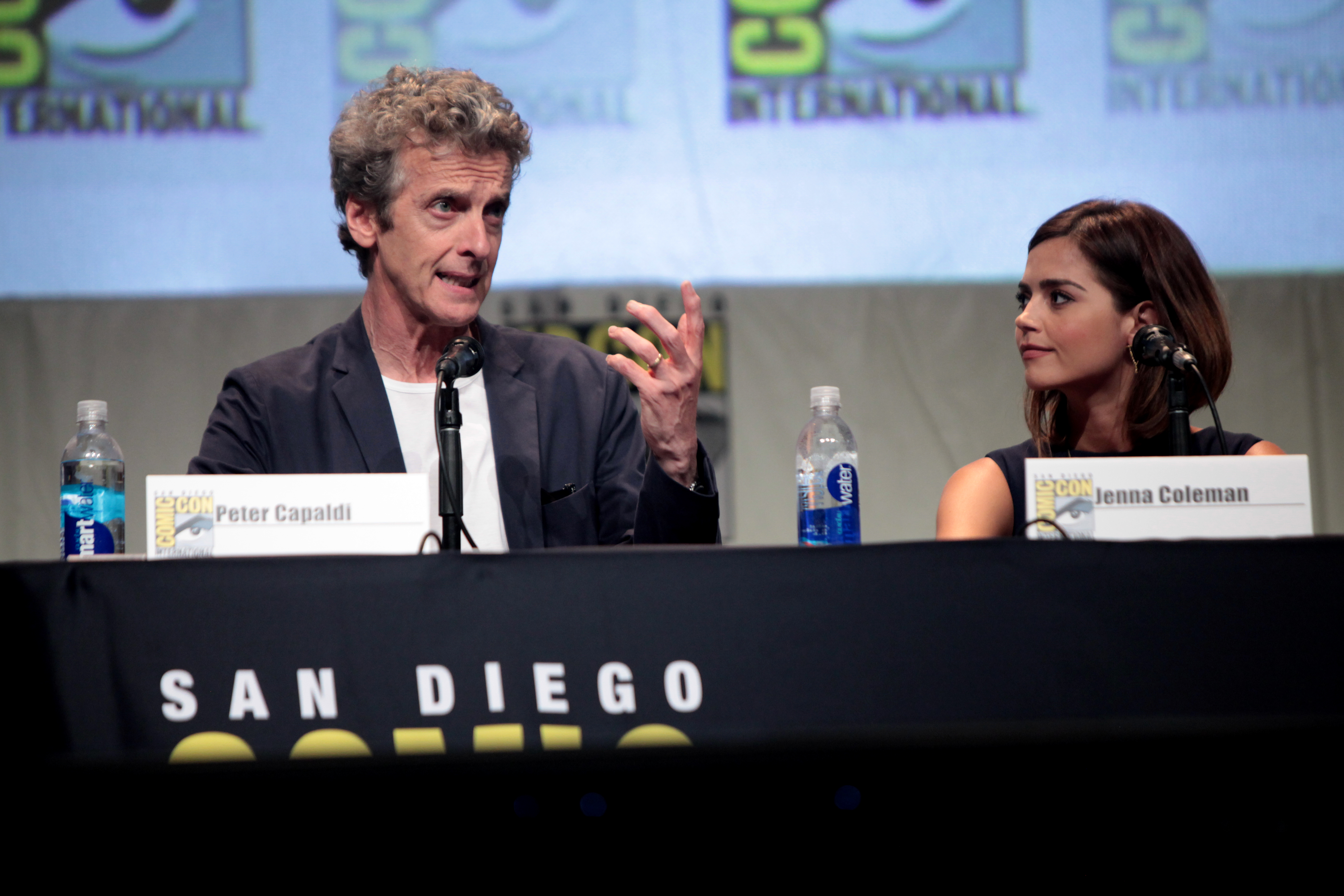
Peter Capaldi and Coleman in 2015

On 21 March 2012, Doctor Who producer Steven Moffat confirmed at a press conference that Coleman would play the companion of the Eleventh Doctor (Matt Smith). Moffat chose her for the role because she worked the best alongside Smith and could talk faster than he could. She auditioned for the role in secret, under the pretence of auditioning for Men on Waves (an anagram for "Woman Seven": she would first appear in the revival's seventh series).

Although originally announced as beginning her run as companion in the Christmas special in 2012, Coleman made a surprise appearance on 1 September 2012 in the first episode of the seventh series as Oswin Oswald, a guest character. Coleman subsequently debuted as a series regular in the Christmas special episode "The Snowmen" as Victorian governess and barmaid Clara Oswin Oswald. In that episode, Coleman also played a third version of the character, a resident of twenty-first-century London simply named Clara Oswald. Beginning in "The Bells of Saint John", this version begins her travels as the Doctor's regular companion, She was first credited on screen as Jenna Coleman in Doctor Who Live: The Next Doctor, which aired on 4 August 2013. She continued after the Eleventh Doctor's regeneration into the Twelfth Doctor, played by Peter Capaldi, in the 2013 Christmas special episode "The Time of the Doctor." In the 2014 Christmas special episode "Last Christmas", it was revealed that Coleman would remain in the role of Clara for Series 9. However, the ninth series was her last, as Coleman had decided to leave the show to take on a role as Queen Victoria in an ITV production.

She returned to the show for Twelfth Doctor's last episode "Twice Upon a Time" where she made a cameo appearance; that episode, Doctor Who's 2017 Christmas special, aired the same evening as the first Christmas special for Victoria.

=== 2015–2021: Victoria and other work ===
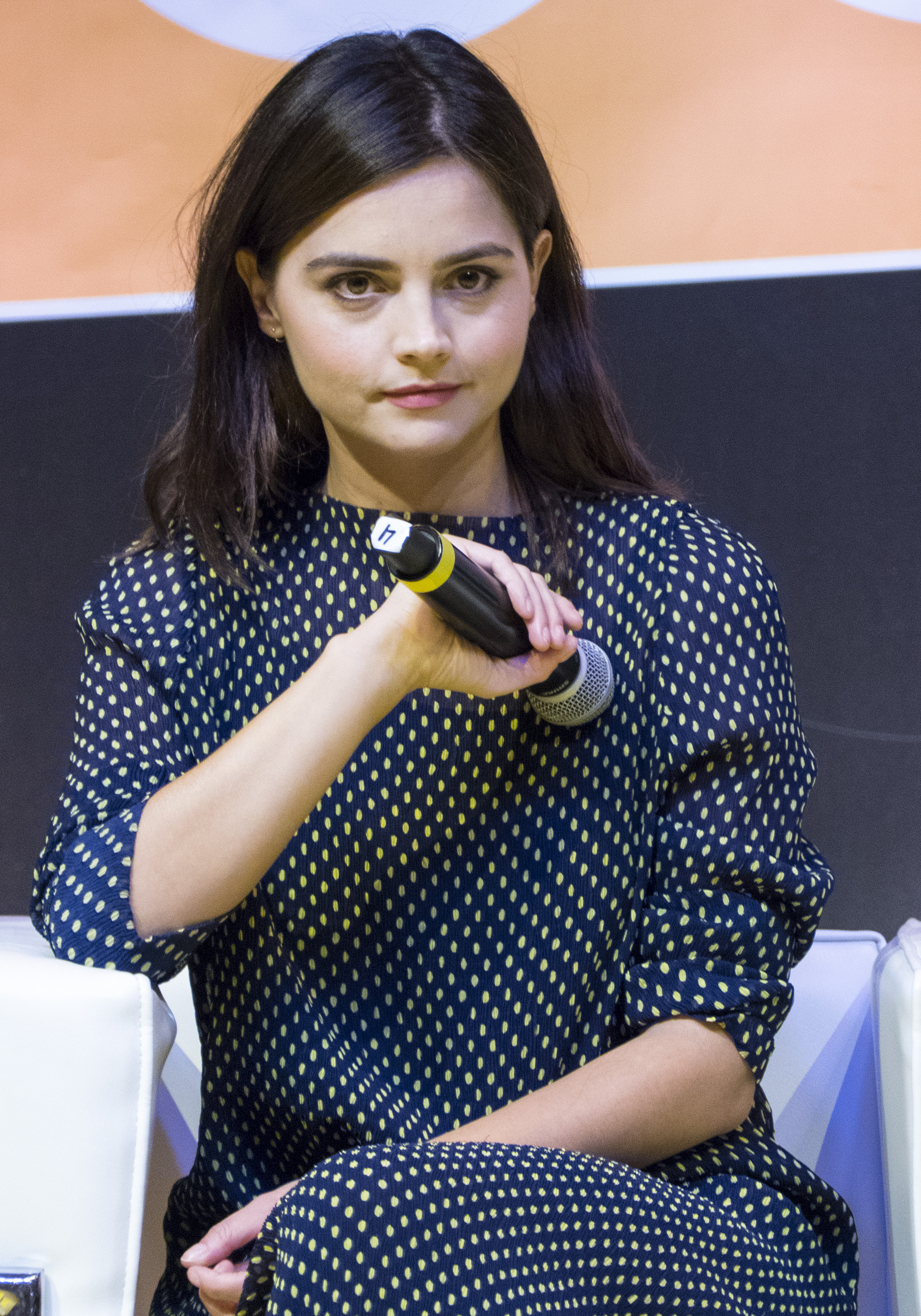
Coleman in November 2017

In 2015, Coleman was cast in ITV's eight-part drama following the reign of the British monarch and Empress of India, Victoria. She confessed that she was not fully informed about Victorian history, but researched the role. When interviewed for BBC Radio 4's Woman's Hour, Coleman expressed her admiration for the monarch. She argued that this role meant she was able to break out of her supposed "box" as a northern working-class character that Emmerdale put her in. Victoria premiered on 28 August 2016 on ITV, and in September 2016, ITV renewed Victoria for a second series. A Christmas special for 2017 was also commissioned and a third series was announced in December 2017.

In 2017, Coleman became the narrator for a Royal Caribbean UK advertising campaign. On 8 January 2018, Coleman was confirmed to play Joanna in the four-part BBC drama The Cry, an adaptation of the 2013 novel by Helen FitzGerald.

In 2019, Coleman starred as Annie in the Old Vic Theatre's production of All My Sons, which ran from 13 April to 8 June and included a cinema screening via National Theatre Live on 14 May. In February 2019, it was announced that Coleman would make a guest appearance in an episode from series five of the dark comedy series Inside No. 9, with an expected broadcast date later in the year. Series five returned to the screen on 3 February 2020.

On 11 May 2019, in an interview with Graham Norton on his BBC Radio 2 program, Coleman indicated her intent to return to Victoria for a fourth series should it be renewed by ITV, but stated that the show will be taking "a bit of a breather" before production resumes. Also in 2019, Coleman was selected for the role of Marie-Andrée Leclerc in the Netflix and BBC drama The Serpent, a dramatisation of the life of convicted serial killer Charles Sobhraj. Production of The Serpent began in Bangkok in September 2019 and continued into 2020, with an expected BBC broadcast later in the year. As with most other film and television production, work on The Serpent was suspended in March 2020 due to the COVID-19 pandemic. Filming resumed on 17 August in the UK and was completed on 28 August. Due to the delay in filming, the broadcast date for The Serpent was moved to 2021. It premiered on 1 January 2021 on BBC One.

During the COVID-19 pandemic, from April 2020 Coleman participated in The Remote Read, a planned series of online drama performances to raise funds for theatrical workers left unemployed by the pandemic. The first production under this banner, an adaptation of Tom Stoppard's A Separate Peace (1966), was transmitted via the Zoom videoconferencing platform on 2 May 2020. Coleman also recorded the short story Pressures, Residential by Philip Hensher, in support of UNICEF UK, as well as The Tale of the Flopsy Bunnies by Beatrix Potter, as part of a collection of audiobooks in Beatrix Potter: The Complete Tales. In May 2020, nine years after its original English release, Coleman reprised her role as Princess Melia Antiqua in the video game Xenoblade Chronicles: Definitive Edition, which features a new epilogue taking place after the main story. She then returned as Melia in Xenoblade Chronicles 3 in 2022, where she is depicted as Queen of the Keves Nation.

Coleman headed Boots UK's 2021 Christmas ad campaign, "Bags of Joy". Her character, Joy, is shown to give Christmas presents to friends and family out of a bag that is bigger on the inside. In May 2021, Coleman was cast as Johanna Constantine, the great-great-great-grandmother of John Constantine in DC Comics' The Sandman TV series. The series debuted on Netflix in August 2022, when it was revealed that Coleman was playing two roles; the aforementioned version of Johanna and her present day descendant of the same name. This new interpretation led to calls for a spin-off series. Coleman reprised the role in the series' second and final season.

=== 2022–present ===
In 2021, initial press releases for a possible historical drama series, The War Rooms, stated that Coleman was attached to portray Joan Bright, whose eponymous autobiography the series was to be based on; as of 2025, no such production has moved forward.

In February 2021, Coleman was cast in the dark comedy Klokkenluider. Filming began on 28 February in East Sussex, for a three-week shoot in a COVID-secure "bubble". The film premiered at the 66th BFI London Film Festival on 8 October 2022.

Coleman returned to the West End stage beginning in January 2023, co-starring with Aidan Turner in a revival of the 2015 Sam Steiner play, Lemons Lemons Lemons Lemons Lemons, initially with a nine-week run at the Harold Pinter Theatre in London, followed by runs in Manchester and Brighton up until April. That same year she played Liv Taylor in the Amazon Prime thriller Wilderness, based on B.E. Jones' novel of the same name, alongside Oliver Jackson-Cohen. The series was streamed on Amazon Prime beginning on 15 September 2023. She also appeared as Bo in Jamie Childs' thriller film, Jackdaw, reuniting once again with Jackson-Cohen. The film debuted at Fantastic Fest in Austin, Texas in September 2023.

Coleman starred as police detective Ember Manning in the 2024 BBC One crime drama series The Jetty; she also acted as executive producer on the series. She will feature in the upcoming political comedy-drama series Number 10, created and written by Steven Moffat.

== Personal life ==
Coleman was in a relationship with Scottish actor Richard Madden from 2011 to 2015. Coleman dated actor Tom Hughes, her Victoria co-star, from 2016 to 2020. She has been in a relationship with British director and filmmaker Jamie Childs since 2020 after meeting on the set of The Sandman. The couple have a child together, born 2024.

== Charity work ==
Coleman has been involved with charity work in South Africa raising awareness of HIV with One To One Children's Fund, for which she is an ambassador. She is also an ambassador for Place2Be, a charity providing emotional and therapeutic services in schools. Coleman has also regularly supported Comic Relief and Red Nose Day. Coleman participated in the Cinema4Gaza organisation's live table-read of Pride and Prejudice in October 2025.

== Acting credits ==
Key
| † | Denotes films that have not yet been released |

=== Film ===
| Year | Title | Role | Notes | Ref. |
|---|---|---|---|---|
| 2011 | Captain America: The First Avenger | Connie | | |
| 2016 | Me Before You | Katrina "Treena" Clark | | |
| 2022 | Klokkenluider | Flo | | |
| 2023 | Jackdaw | Bo | | |
| 2024 | All of You | Robyn | | |
| TBA | Control † | TBA | Post-production | |

=== Television ===
| Year | Title | Role | Notes | Ref. |
|---|---|---|---|---|
| 2005–2009 | Emmerdale | Jasmine Thomas | Main cast (180 episodes) (Note: Disputed: some Emmerdale fan websites suggest she appeared in more than 400 episodes) | |
| 2009 | Waterloo Road | Lindsay James | Main cast (series 5) | |
| 2012 | Titanic | Annie Desmond | Main cast, miniseries | |
| 2012 | Room at the Top | Susan Brown | Main cast, miniseries | |
| 2012–2017 | Doctor Who | Clara Oswald (Note: Also played several variants of the character, primarily two named Oswin Oswald and Clara Oswin Oswald.) | Guest (2 episodes – series 7, 10), Main cast (series 7–9) (Note: Also appeared in several mini episodes and sketches.) | |
| 2013 | Dancing on the Edge | Rosie Williams | 2 episodes | |
| 2013 | The Five(ish) Doctors Reboot | Herself | Television film | |
| 2013 | Death Comes to Pemberley | Lydia Wickham | Main cast, miniseries | |
| 2016 | Thunderbirds Are Go | Baines (voice) | Episode: "Earthbreaker" | |
| 2016–2019 | Victoria | Queen Victoria | Title role | |
| 2018 | The Cry | Joanna Lindsay | Main cast, miniseries | |
| 2020 | Inside No. 9 | Beattie | Episode: "Death Be Not Proud" | |
| 2021 | The Serpent | Marie-Andrée Leclerc | Main cast, miniseries | |
| 2021 | Billion Pound Bond Street | Narrator | Documentary | |
| 2022–2025 | The Sandman | Lady Johanna Constantine / Modern-day Johanna Constantine (Note: Two different characters, the latter the descendant of the former. Modern-day Johanna is based on the character John Constantine.) | Recurring role (season 1 & 2) | |
| 2023 | Wilderness | Liv Taylor | Main cast, miniseries | |
| 2024 | The Jetty | Ember Manning | Main cast; also executive producer | |
| 2026 | Number 10 † | Katie Flynn | Main cast | |

=== Stage ===
| Year | Title | Role | Notes | Ref. |
|---|---|---|---|---|
| 1996 | Summer Holiday | Bridesmaid | | |
| 1999 | Snow White | Young Snow White | | |
| 2004 | Crystal Clear | Thomasina | In Yer Space | |
| 2009 | Jack and the Beanstalk | Princess Apricot | Theatre Royal, Nottingham; pantomime | |
| 2019 | All My Sons | Ann Deever | Old Vic Theatre; streamed via National Theatre Live | |
| 2020 | A Separate Peace | Nurse Maggie Coates | Virtual play; broadcast online during COVID-19 lockdown in the United Kingdom | |
| 2023 | Lemons Lemons Lemons Lemons Lemons | Bernadette | Harold Pinter Theatre; Manchester Opera House; Theatre Royal, Brighton | |

=== Video games ===
| Year | Title | Role | Notes | Ref. |
|---|---|---|---|---|
| 2010 | Xenoblade Chronicles | Melia Antiqua | English dub | |
| 2015 | Lego Dimensions | Clara Oswald | Main game and Doctor Who expansion | |
| 2020 | Xenoblade Chronicles: Definitive Edition | Melia Antiqua | English dub | |
| 2022 | Xenoblade Chronicles 3 | Melia Antiqua | English dub | |
| 2026 | Xenoblade Chronicles: Definitive Edition - Nintendo Switch 2 Edition | Melia Antiqua | English dub | |

=== Audio ===
| Year | Title | Role | Notes |
|---|---|---|---|
| 2013 | The Secret Garden | Narrator | Abridged reading; originally released on CD and later through Audible |
| 2013 | Doctor Who: Destiny of the Doctor | Alice Watson / Eleventh Doctor | Limited-cast dramatic reading. Episode: "The Time Machine" Originally released on CD and later digitally through Big Finish Productions |
| 2016 | A Christmas Carol | Belle | Full cast audio drama; Audible digital release only |
| 2020 | Pressures, Residential | Narrator | Short story posted online by Esquire Magazine; in aid of UNICEF UK |
| 2020 | Beatrix Potter: The Complete Tales (2-CD set) | Narrator | Short story: "The Tale of the Flopsy Bunnies" |
| 2024 | Iris is More Than Okay | Narrator | Audible-exclusive original novella |
| 2024 | We All Live Here | Narrator | |
| 2026 | People Pleaser | Narrator | |

=== Advertisements ===
Coleman has provided narration for many TV, radio and online commercials, but this listing is only of ones in which she performs on screen:

| Year | Title | Role | Notes | Ref. |
|---|---|---|---|---|
| 2021 | Bags of Joy | Joy | Boots Christmas advert | |

== Awards and nominations ==
| Year | Award | Category | Work | Result |
|---|---|---|---|---|
| 2006 | National Television Awards | Most Popular Newcomer | Emmerdale | Nominated |
| 2006 | The British Soap Awards | Best Newcomer | Emmerdale | Nominated |
| 2009 | The British Soap Awards | Best Dramatic Performance | Emmerdale | Nominated |
| 2009 | The British Soap Awards | Sexiest Female | Emmerdale | Nominated |
| 2009 | The British Soap Awards | Best Actress | Emmerdale | Nominated |
| 2013 | Behind the Voice Actors Awards | Best Female Vocal Performance in a Video Game | Xenoblade Chronicles | Nominated |
| 2013 | Behind the Voice Actors Awards | Best Vocal Ensemble in a Video Game | Xenoblade Chronicles | Nominated |
| 2013 | NAVGTR Awards | Supporting Performance in a Drama | Xenoblade Chronicles | Nominated |
| 2013 | Nickelodeon UK Kids' Choice Awards | Favourite UK Actress | Doctor Who | Nominated |
| 2013 | TV Choice Awards | Best Actress | Doctor Who | Nominated |
| 2013 | TV Times Awards | Favourite Newcomer | Doctor Who | Won |
| 2014 | Glamour Awards | UK TV Actress | Doctor Who | Won |
| 2015 | BAFTA Cymru | Best Actress | Doctor Who: "Kill the Moon" | Nominated |
| 2015 | Saturn Awards | Best Supporting Actress on Television | Doctor Who | Nominated |
| 2015 | TV Choice Awards | Best Actress | Doctor Who | Nominated |
| 2017 | Golden Nymph Awards | Outstanding Actress in a Drama TV Series | Victoria | Won |
| 2017 | National Television Awards | Best Drama Performance | Victoria | Nominated |
| 2018 | Movieguide Awards | Grace Award for Most Inspiring Performance for TV | Victoria | Nominated |
| 2018 | National Television Awards | Best Drama Performance | Victoria | Nominated |
| 2018 | Harper's Bazaar Women of the Year Awards | TV Actress of the Year | The Cry | Won |
| 2018 | I Talk Telly Awards | Best Dramatic Performance | The Cry | Won |
| 2019 | Logie Awards | Most Outstanding Actress | The Cry | Won |
| 2019 | Logie Awards | Most Popular Actress | The Cry | Nominated |
| 2019 | BAFTA Scotland Awards | Best Actress in Television | The Cry | Nominated |
| 2019 | International Emmy Awards | Best Actress | The Cry | Nominated |
| 2019 | AACTA Awards | Best Lead Actress in a Television Drama | The Cry | Nominated |
