= Clara Oswald =

- Doctor Who character
- Jenna Coleman as Clara Oswald
- First appearance: "Asylum of the Daleks" (2012)
- Last appearance: "Twice Upon a Time" (2017)
- Created by: Steven Moffat
- Portrayed by: Jenna Coleman
- Duration: 2012–2015, 2017

In-universe information
- Full name: Clara Oswald
- Nickname: "The Impossible Girl" (by the Doctor)
- Species: Human
- Gender: Female
- Occupation: English teacher Nanny
- Affiliation: Eleventh Doctor; Twelfth Doctor
- Family: Dave Oswald (father); Ellie Oswald (mother)
- Relatives: Mrs Oswald (grandmother)
- Origin: Blackpool, Lancashire, England
- Home: Earth

Clara Oswald is a fictional character in the BBC television series Doctor Who portrayed by Jenna Coleman and created by Steven Moffat. She is a travelling companion of the series' protagonist, the Doctor, in his eleventh (Matt Smith) and twelfth incarnations (Peter Capaldi). Introduced in the seventh series, Clara regularly appeared throughout the 2013 specials, series eight and series nine. She also made a brief appearance in "Twice Upon a Time" (2017).

"Asylum of the Daleks" (2012) and "The Snowmen" (2012) introduce three identical-looking incarnations of Clara from different periods of history. The first two incarnations die as a consequence of their adventures with the Doctor. The third incarnation, a 21st-century nanny and later schoolteacher, travels with the Doctor as he tries to uncover the mystery of her multiple lives. This is explained in "The Name of the Doctor" (2013), when Clara enters the Doctor's timestream, creating numerous "echoes" of her across the Doctor's past. Clara witnesses the Doctor regenerate into his twelfth incarnation and comes to accept the change despite initial uncertainty. Through her exposure to the Doctor's life, Clara develops a thrill-seeking personality which leads to her death in "Face the Raven" (2015). The Doctor resurrects Clara in "Hell Bent" (2015) at the expense of having his memories of her erased. Now functionally immortal, Clara leaves the Doctor to explore the universe with Ashildr (Maisie Williams).

Clara was introduced to succeed Amy Pond (Karen Gillan) and Rory Williams (Arthur Darvill) as the Doctor's companion and renew his curiosity in the universe. While the character's first two incarnations were well-received, critics and audiences were mixed on the introduction of her primary version. Clara's "Impossible Girl" story arc was criticised for reducing her to a "Manic Pixie Dream Girl", but her character development and dynamic with the Twelfth Doctor in the following two series was praised, although some fans felt that she had become too central to the series' lore. In 2015, Coleman was nominated for both a Saturn Award and a BAFTA Cymru Award for her performance. Clara is also one of the Doctor's longest-serving companions.

== Appearances ==
=== Television ===
Prior to Clara Oswald's introduction, the series introduced two distinct incarnations of the character in "Asylum of the Daleks" (left) and "The Snowmen".

Oswin Oswald (Jenna Coleman) (Note: Coleman was credited as Jenna-Louise Coleman in her initial appearances as Clara and her various incarnations. She was credited as Jenna Coleman as of "The Day of the Doctor" (2013).) is introduced in the series 7 premiere, "Asylum of the Daleks" (2012). She is the sole survivor of the starship Alaska, which crashed on the Asylum, a prison planet for insane Daleks. Oswin sees herself as human, but the Eleventh Doctor (Matt Smith) discovers that she was converted into a Dalek and coped by dreaming that she is still human. She sacrifices herself to help the Doctor and his travelling companions, Amy Pond (Karen Gillan) and Rory Williams (Arthur Darvill), escape the planet unharmed. In the 2012 Christmas special "The Snowmen", the Doctor meets a Victorian barmaid and governess named Clara Oswin Oswald (Coleman), whom he initially knows only as Clara. He invites her to be his newest companion but she is killed by one of the Great Intelligence's minions. Seeing her full name on her tombstone and finally recognising her voice, the Doctor realises Clara and Oswin are somehow the same woman. He begins searching across time for another Clara. Unknown to the Doctor, another incarnation of Clara Oswald (Coleman) is introduced living in 2010s London.

In "The Bells of Saint John" (2013), Clara inadvertently calls the Doctor, having received the phone number for his time machine, the TARDIS, from a mysterious woman. The Doctor takes her on as a companion with a goal to solving the mystery of her multiple lives—he nicknames her the "Impossible Girl". The Doctor's attempts at investigating her origins over the course of "The Rings of Akhaten", "Hide", and "Journey to the Centre of the TARDIS" consistently turn up compelling evidence that she is a normal human woman. In "Journey to the Centre of the TARDIS", the Doctor confronts Clara in an averted timeline about the two previous versions of her he had met, but she has no knowledge of this. The mystery is resolved in "The Name of the Doctor" when Clara sacrifices her existence by entering the Doctor's timestream to undo harm caused by the Great Intelligence (Richard E Grant). This creates numerous "echoes" of Clara throughout the Doctor's past history who save his life in numerous ways. One version of Clara successfully persuades the First Doctor (William Hartnell) to pick the "right" TARDIS on his home planet Gallifrey, prior to the events of An Unearthly Child (1963). Clara is lost in the Doctor's timestream but he manages to bring her back into existence. By "The Day of the Doctor", the series's 50th anniversary special, Clara has become a teacher at Coal Hill School. She meets the Doctor's earlier incarnations, the Tenth Doctor (David Tennant) and the War Doctor (John Hurt), the latter of which had annihilated Gallifrey and his people, the Time Lords, to end the destructive Time War. Upset by this action, Clara convinces the Doctor to rewrite history, and he instead seals the planet in a pocket universe. In "The Time of the Doctor", the Time Lords try to return to the universe through a crack in time located on the planet Trenzalore. Knowing that the Time Lords' return will reignite the Time War, the Doctor sends Clara home to her family at Christmas twice while he stays on Trenzalore. Clara returns in the TARDIS each time after two centuries-long intervals. With the Doctor facing certain death at the end of his regeneration cycle, she pleads with the Time Lords to save the Doctor; they grant him a new regeneration cycle and the crack closes.

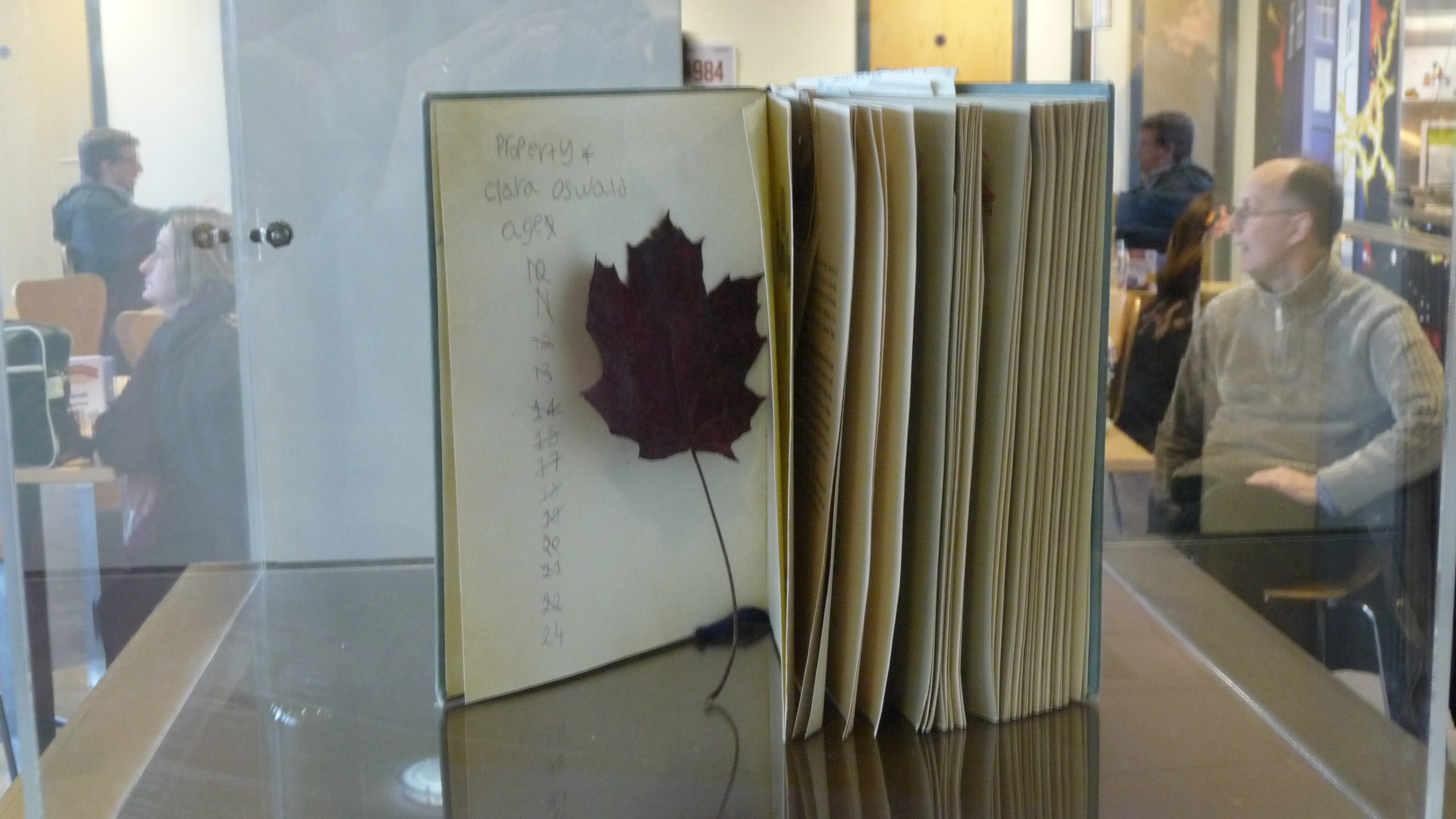
Clara's book of 101 Places to See and the leaf, as shown at the Doctor Who Experience

Clara witnesses the Eleventh Doctor regenerate into the Twelfth Doctor (Peter Capaldi). She grapples with losing the Doctor she knew and loved throughout the events of "Deep Breath" (2014), even considering refusing to travel with him, until a phone call from the Eleventh Doctor prior to his regeneration convinces her to stay by the Doctor's side and help him adjust to his new persona. In "Into the Dalek", Clara and fellow teacher Danny Pink (Samuel Anderson) agree to go for drinks together, and over the course of the episodes "Listen", "Time Heist", and "The Caretaker", the two enter into a romantic relationship. Clara keeps secrets between the Doctor and Danny due to their misgivings about each other. She experiences turbulence in her friendship with the Doctor, particularly in "Kill the Moon" when he abandons her to face a traumatic decision on her own. In "Flatline", she is forced to take the Doctor's role in averting an alien invasion, and realises she is capable of making the same ruthless and pragmatic decisions he often has to make. In "Dark Water", Danny dies in a traffic collision before Clara can announce her intent to commit to him fully. She attempts to threaten the Doctor into changing history to avert Danny's death. Despite her betrayal of the Doctor, he agrees to help her contact Danny from beyond the grave. They discover a facility where evil Time Lord Missy (Michelle Gomez) has stored the consciousnesses of Earth's dead as part of a plot to convert the deceased into a Cyberman army. In "Death in Heaven", Missy reveals that she was the aforementioned woman who gave Clara the TARDIS phone number. Danny is brought back as a Cyberman but he resists his programming in order to destroy Missy's Cyberman army and foil her plans. Two weeks later, Clara and the Doctor meet to farewell each another. The Doctor lies to Clara; he pretends he has found Gallifrey and a home to go back to. Clara lies too; she pretends Danny returned from the dead through Missy's device, when in fact he sacrificed the opportunity to save the life of a child he killed in the Afghanistan war.

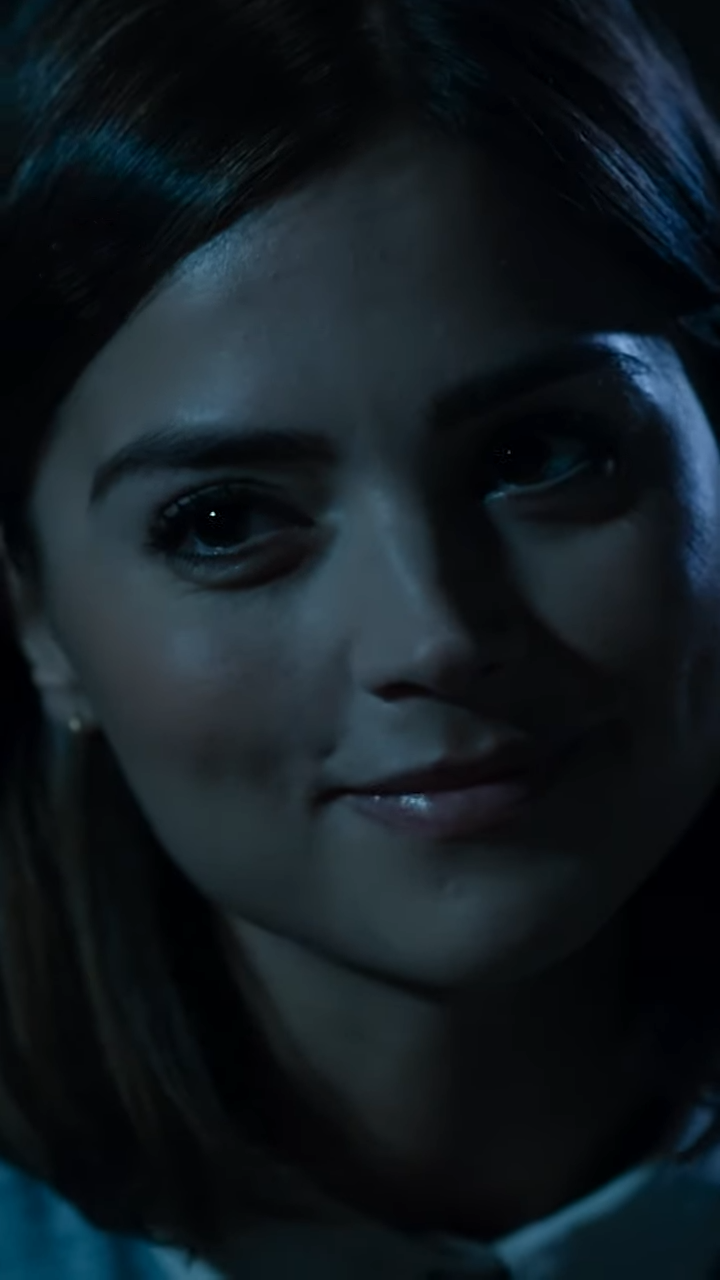
Clara in "Hell Bent", her final regular appearance in the series

Clara reunites with the Doctor in the 2014 Christmas special "Last Christmas", when aliens trap them in a shared dream. Clara dreams that Danny is still alive, but realises it is not real. She admits Danny is dead, while the Doctor confesses he did not find Gallifrey. After waking, they reconcile and Clara agrees to travel with the Doctor again. In series 9, Clara accompanies Missy and the Doctor to Skaro when he is summoned by Davros (Julian Bleach), barely escaping the ordeal with her life. Now an experienced space traveller, Clara shows greater confidence when dealing with alien races and volatile humans, but the Doctor finds himself concerned by her reckless streak. In "The Girl Who Died", Clara and the Doctor use alien technology to resurrect Ashildr (Maisie Williams), a Viking killed during their successful attempt to save her village, but inadvertently give her immortality. Clara's recklessness gets the better of her in "Face the Raven". Her friend Rigsy (Joivan Wade) is sentenced to death by a Quantum Shade (a raven-like being), and is given a numerical tattoo which counts down to his death. Clara convinces him to transfer the tattoo to her, but later learns that this breaks the Shade's contract, making the death sentence irrevokable. Clara cautions the Doctor not to give in to his darker nature in response to her death, which she faces with bravery.

In "Heaven Sent", a grief-stricken Doctor imagines conversations with Clara to clarify his ideas. In "Hell Bent", the Doctor uses Time Lord technology on Gallifrey to extract Clara from her last moments of life. As a result, her biological processes are frozen: she does not have a heartbeat and cannot age. The Doctor plans to return Clara to Earth where she can live a normal life, and he prepares to wipe her memories of him so that the Time Lords cannot use her to find him. Clara tampers with the mind-wiping device so that it wipes the Doctor's memories of her instead. She leaves the Doctor on Earth by the TARDIS to start his adventures anew. Clara tells Ashildr that she intends to one day visit Gallifrey and return to the moment of her death, but vows to take "the long way around". She and Ashildr begin traveling the universe together in a TARDIS stolen from Gallifrey.

In "Twice Upon a Time", the Doctor encounters Testimony, a futuristic organisation which copies people's memories at the moment of death and installs them in sentient avatars. An avatar of the Doctor's companion Bill Potts (Pearl Mackie) restores his memories of Clara; he sees a mental image of her telling him not to forget her again.

In the 60th anniversary special episode "The Giggle", the Toymaker depicts Clara as a marionette alongside Amy and Bill, taunting the Fourteenth Doctor by reminding him of companions who died while travelling with him.

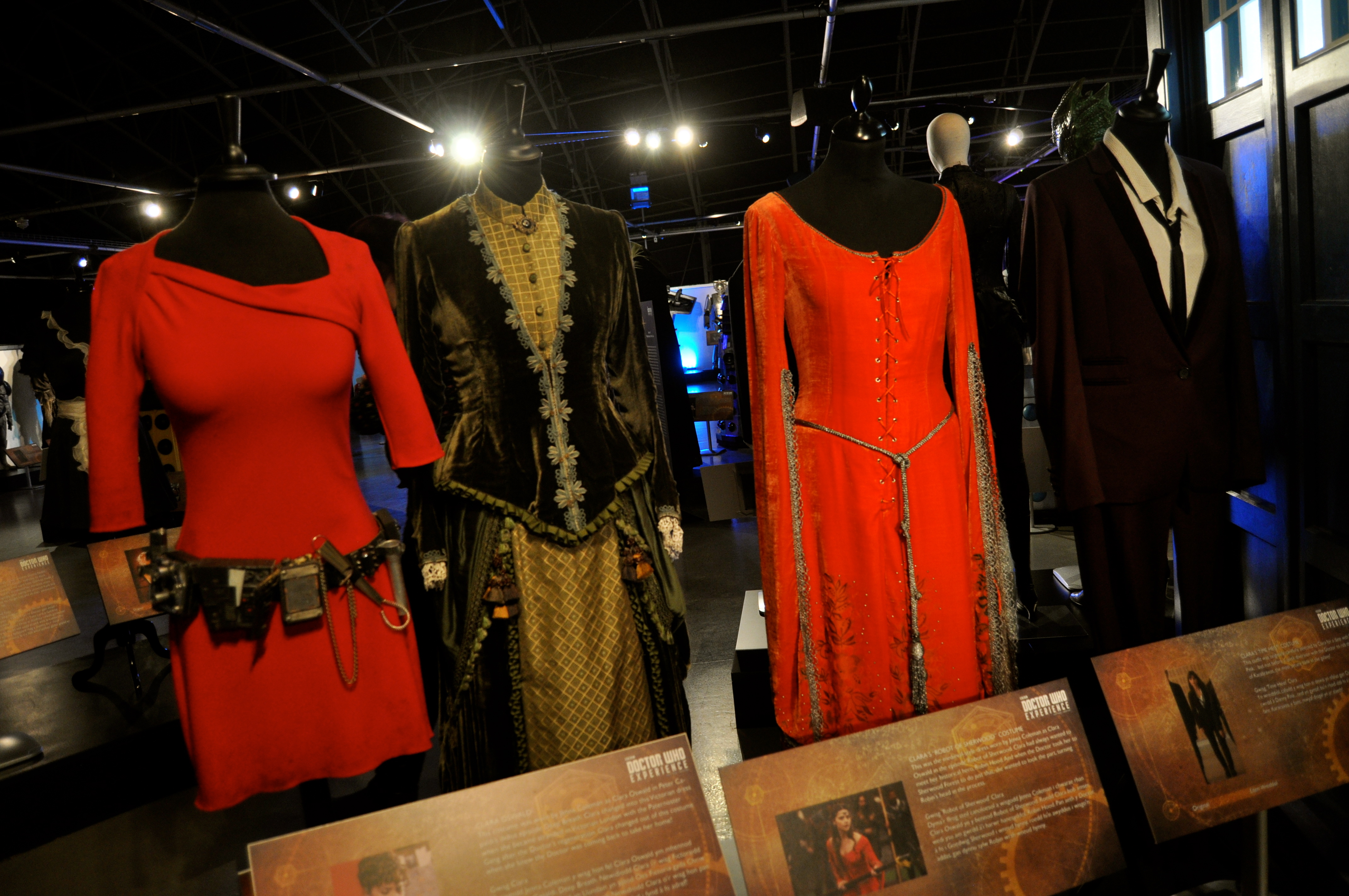
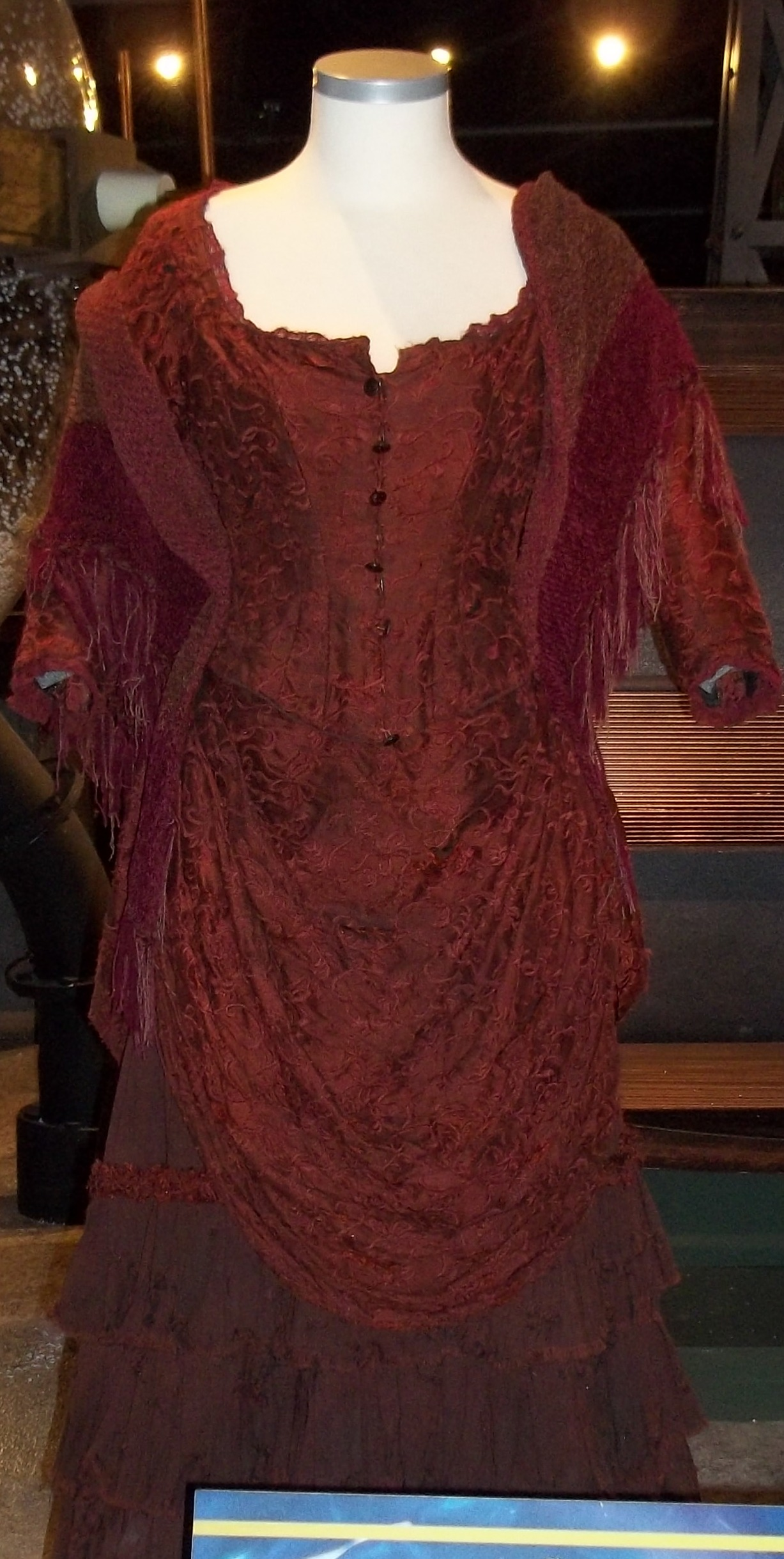
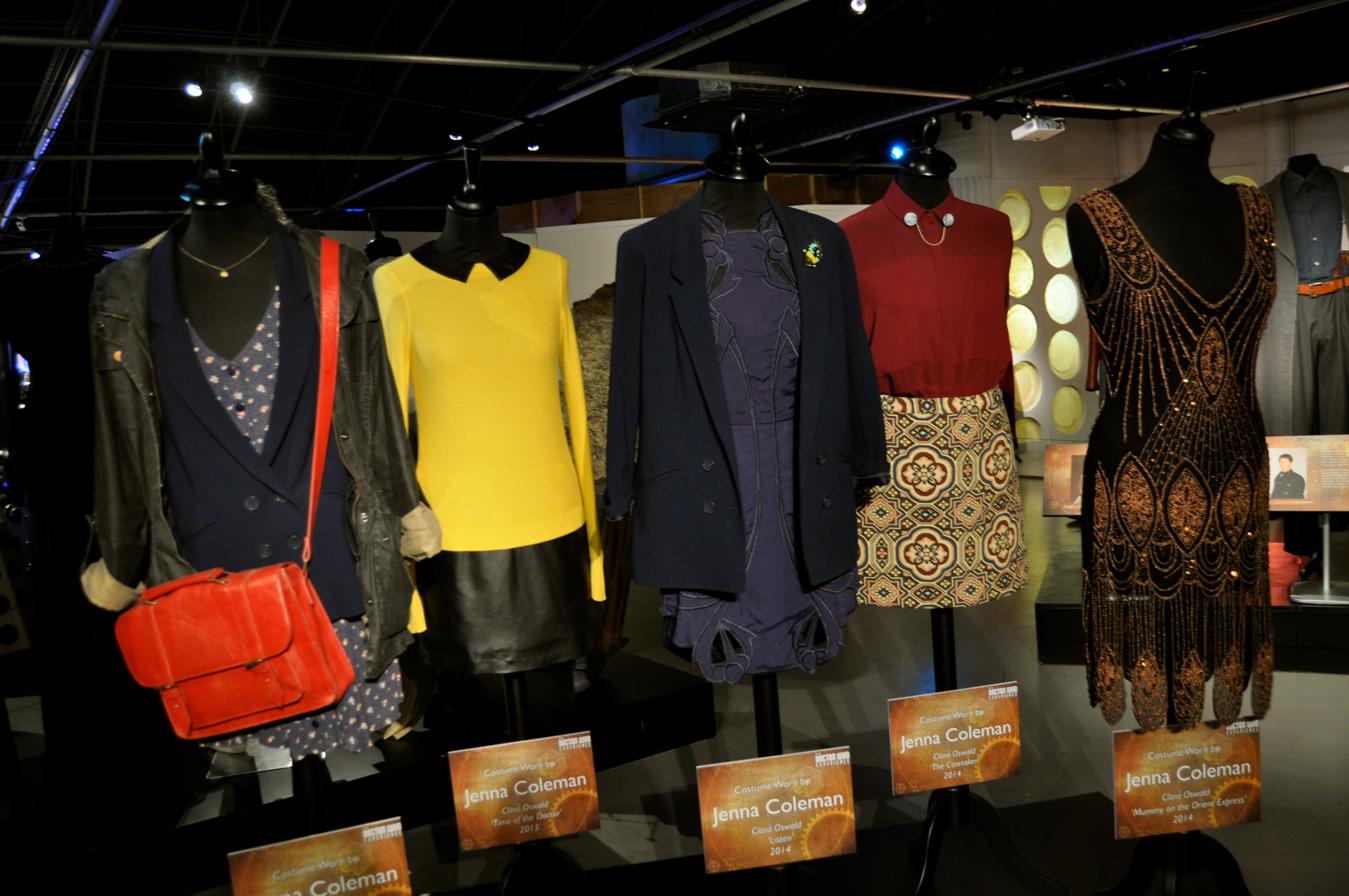
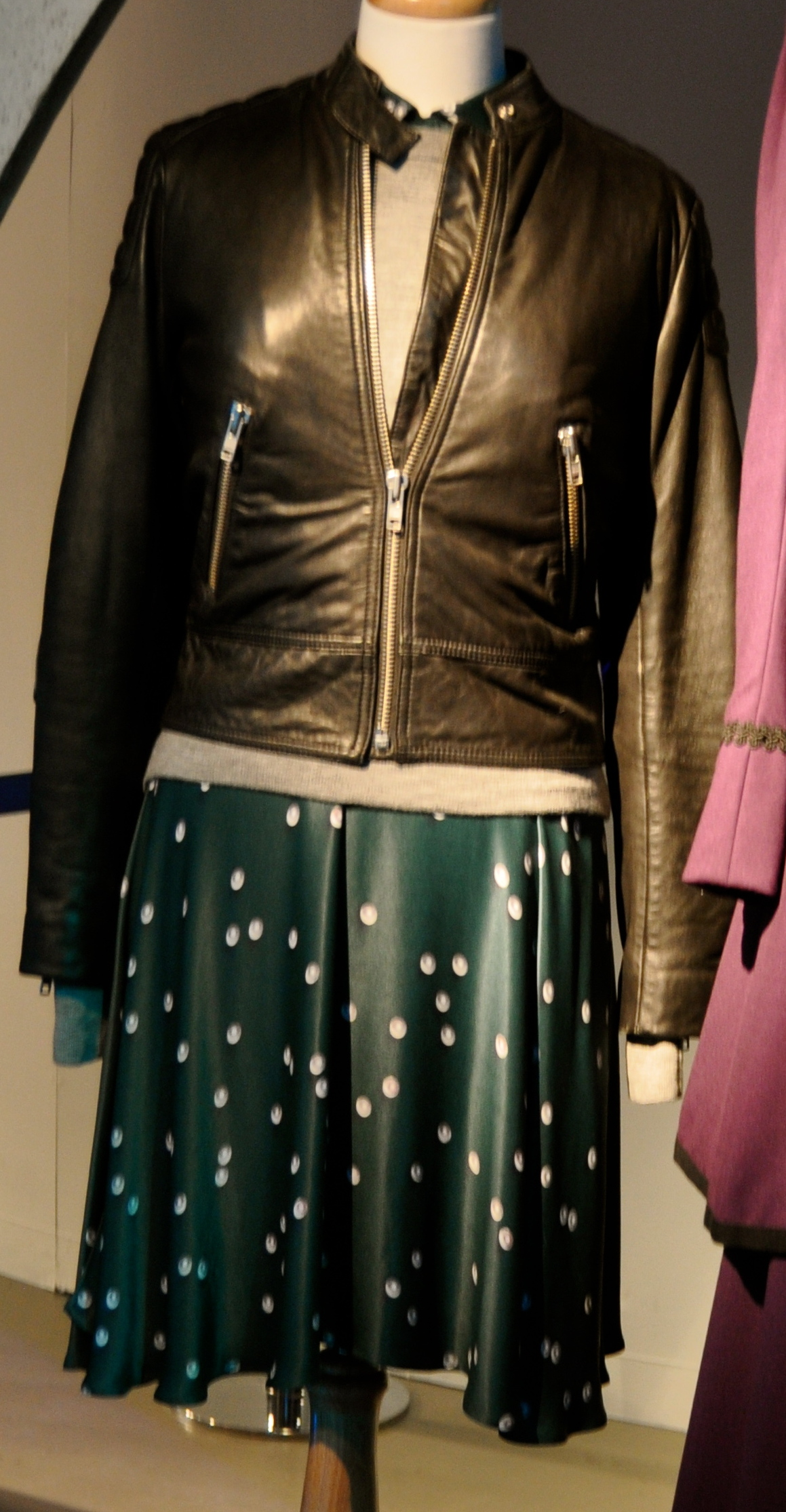
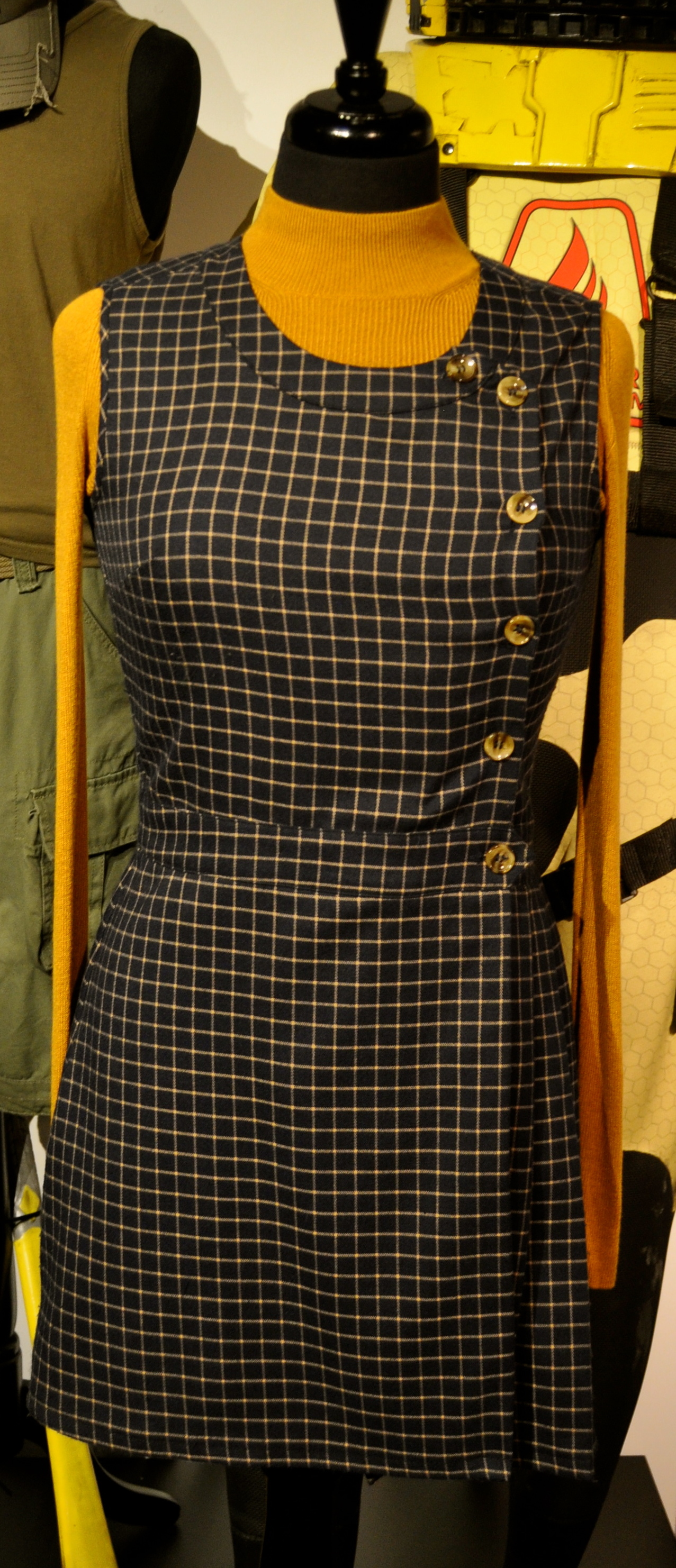
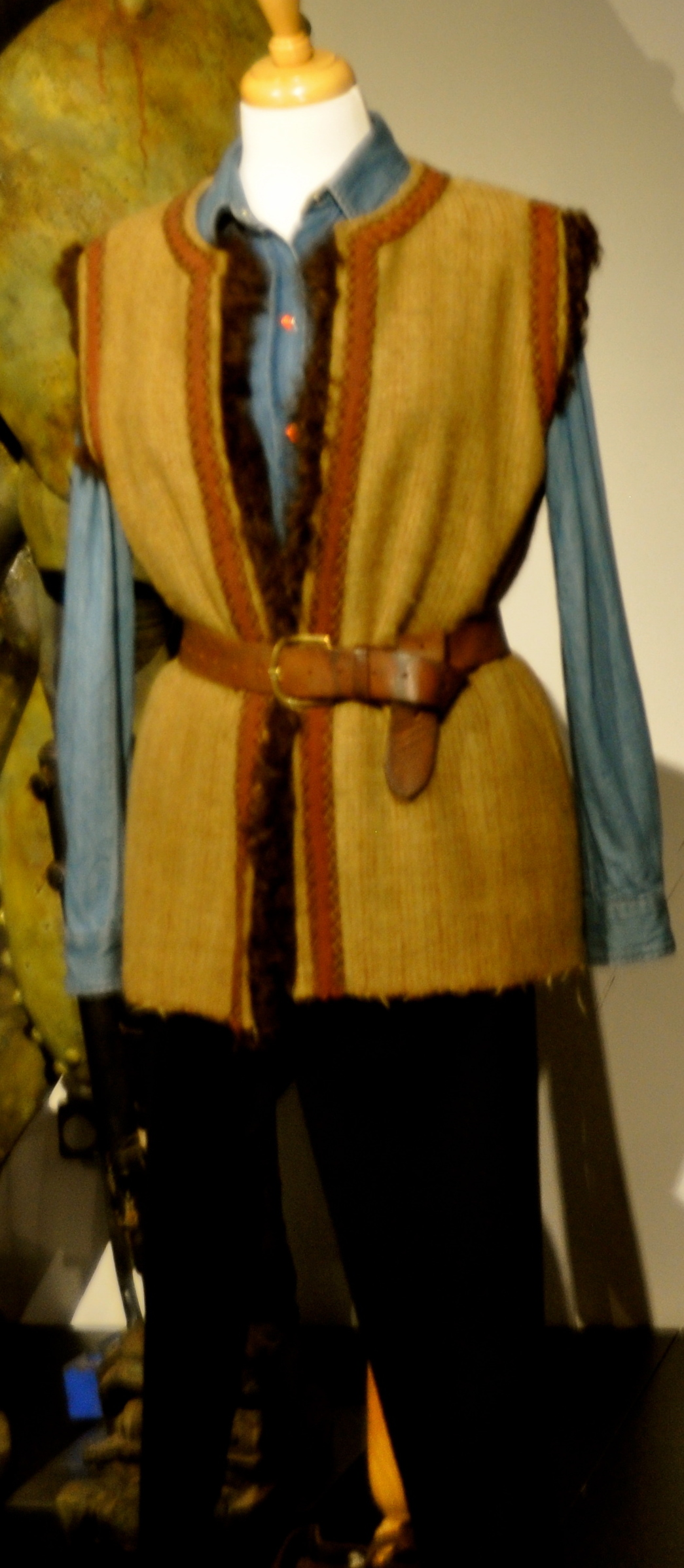
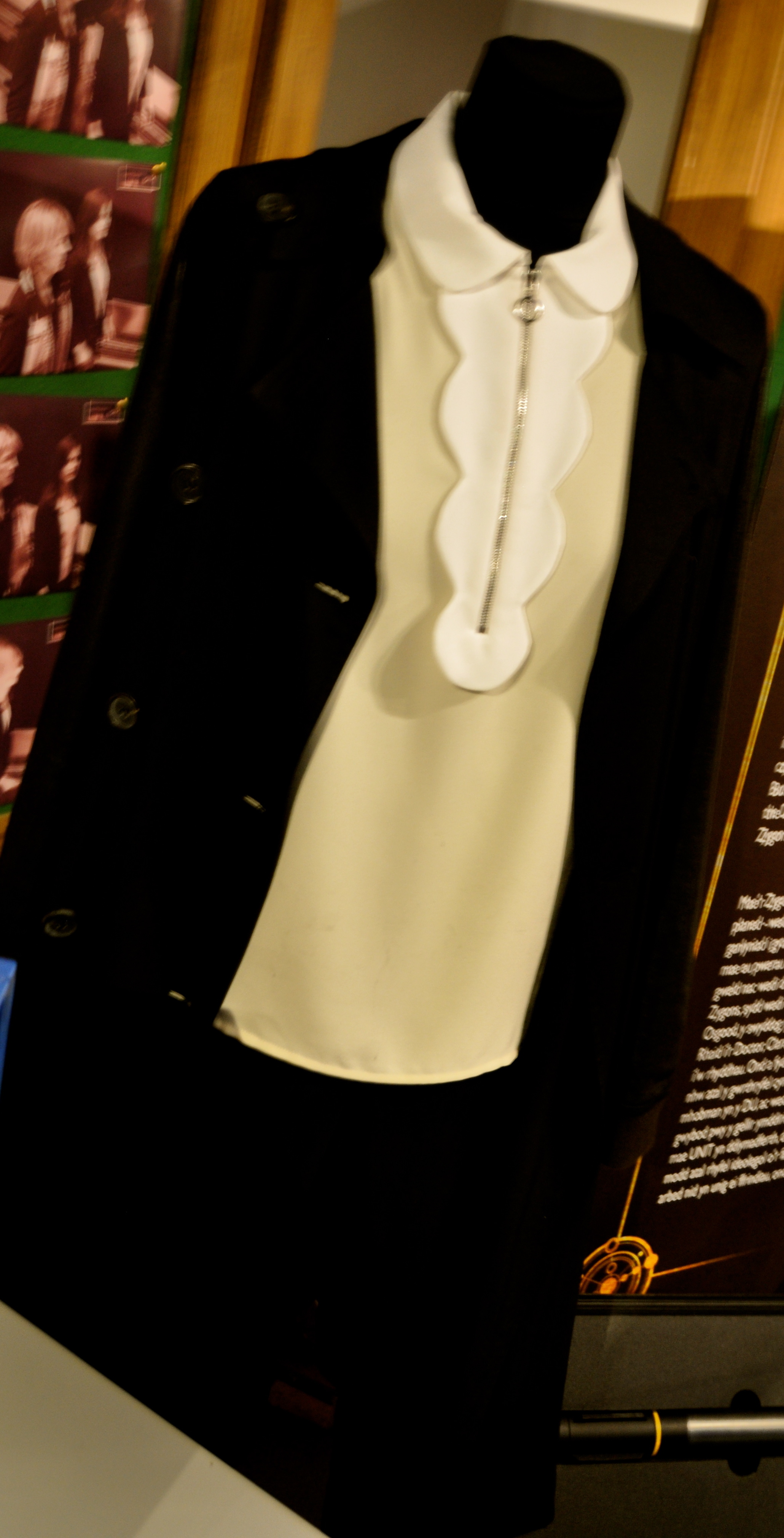
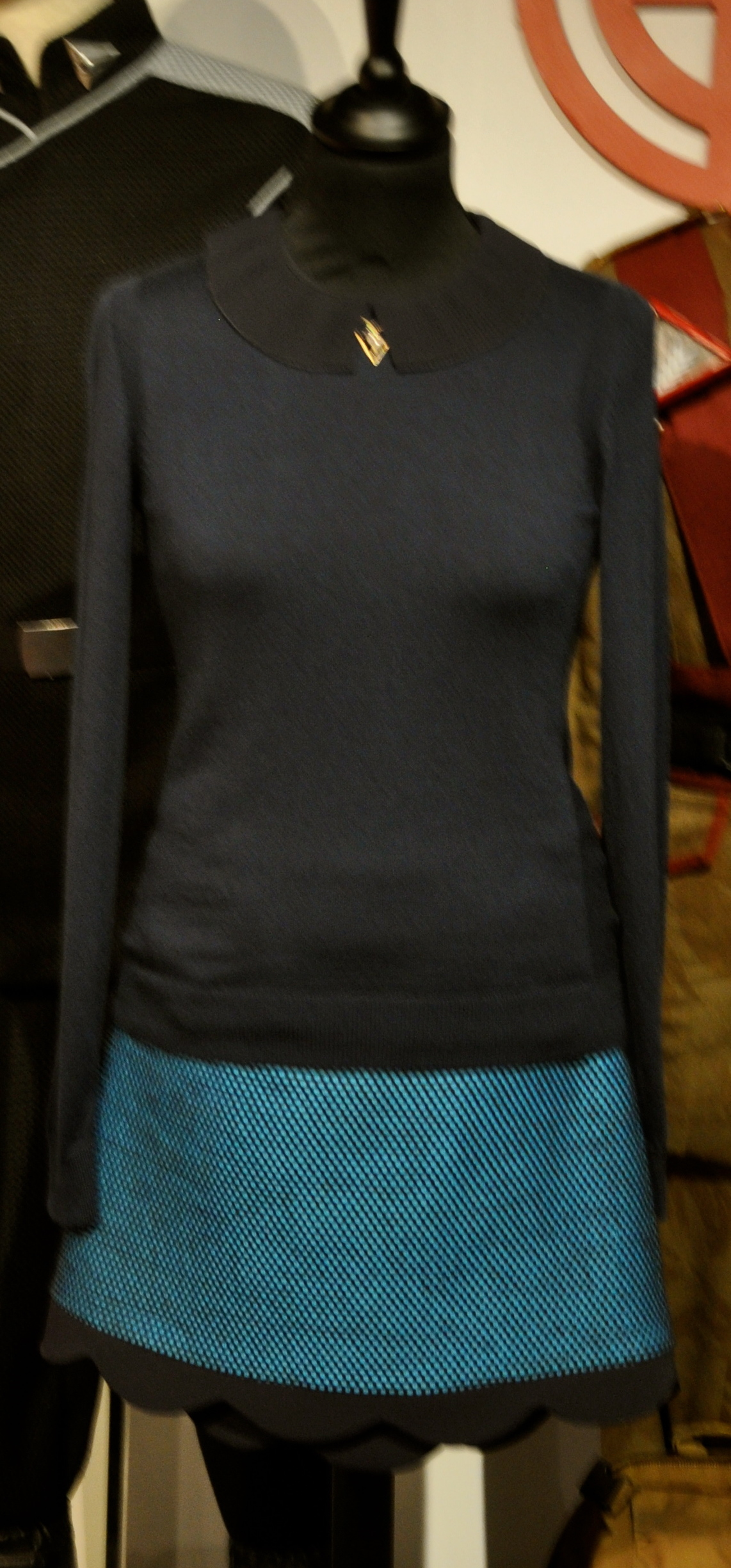
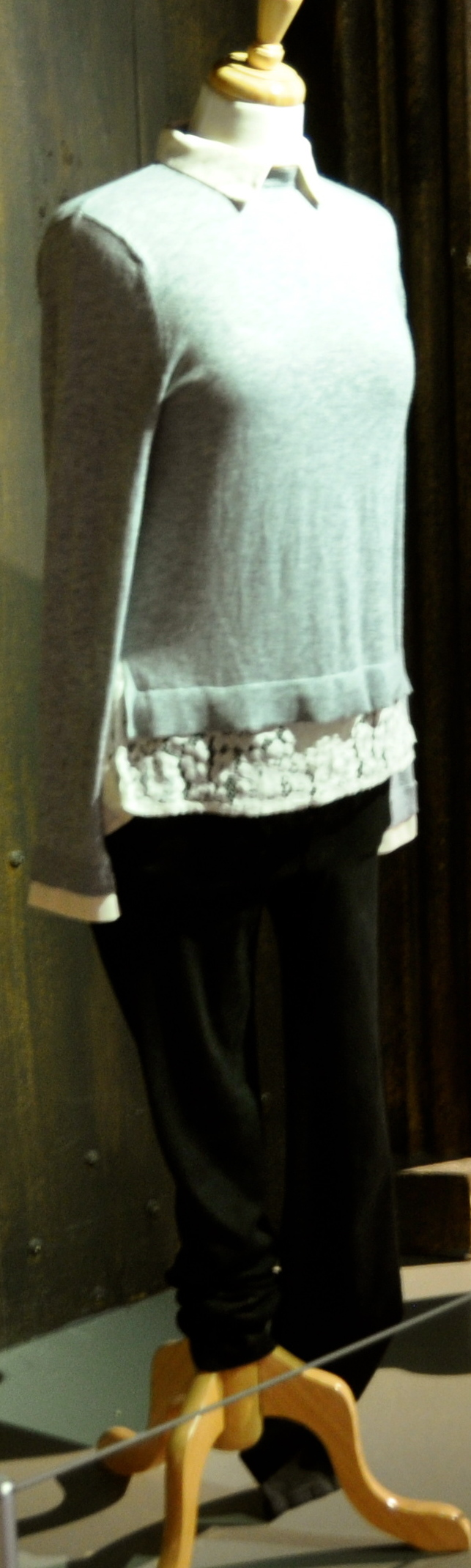
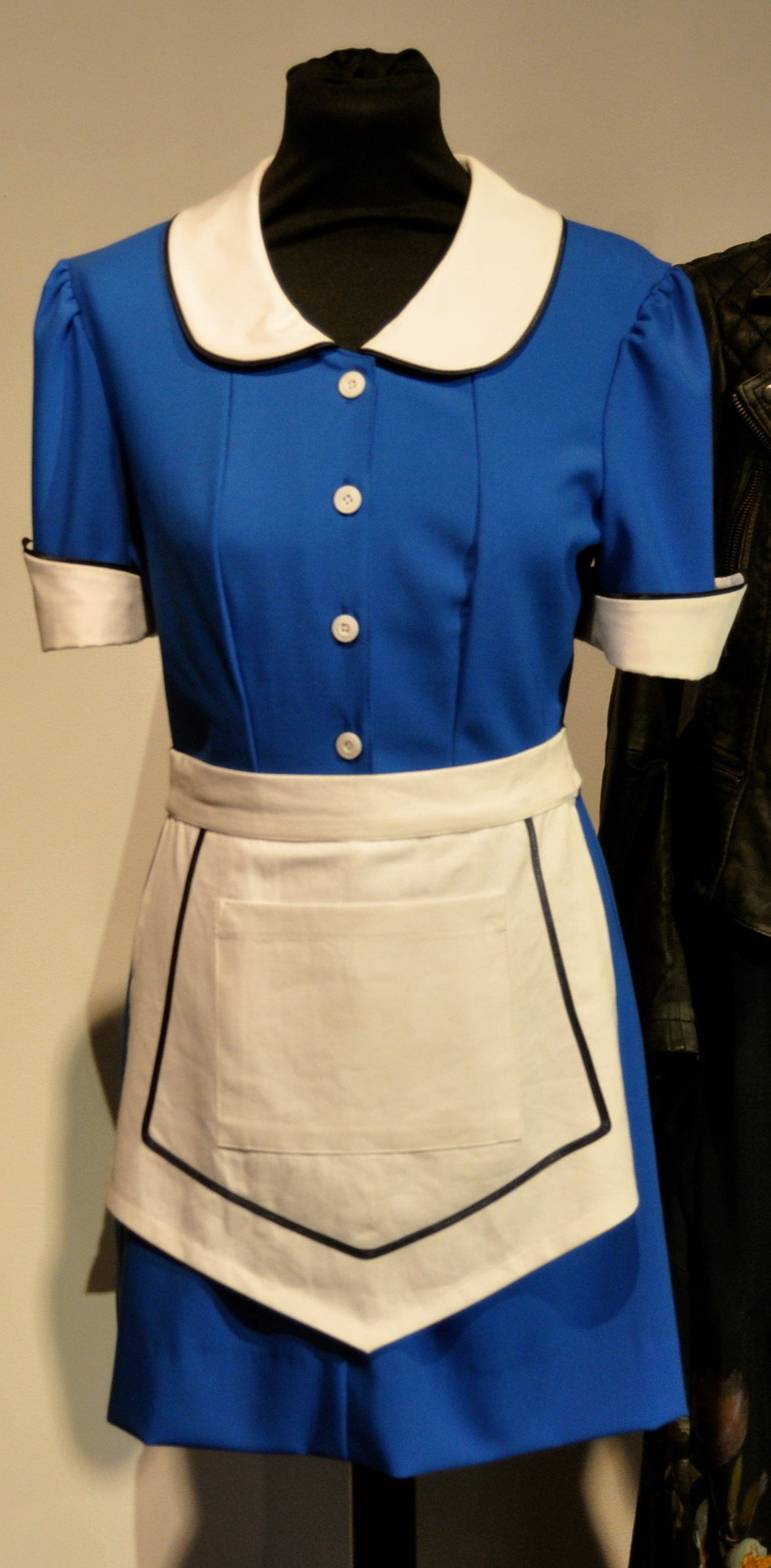
Costumes worn by Clara throughout the series, on display at the Doctor Who Experience

=== Other media ===
In the 2013 online minisode "The Bells of Saint John: A Prequel", a young Clara (Sophie Downham) meets the Eleventh Doctor at a playground. As the Doctor discusses his unsuccessful search for another incarnation of Clara, he fails to realise that the child is Clara herself. Coleman played Clara in "She Said, He Said" (2013), an online prelude to "The Name of the Doctor" in which Clara and the Doctor each speak directly to camera regarding how little they know each other. The seventh series's home media release features Coleman as Clara in the short film "Clara and the TARDIS" (2013), in which she argues with the TARDIS over its changing architecture and learns about the Doctor's past companions.

==== Literature ====
Clara and the Eleventh Doctor feature in the New Series Adventures novel Shroud of Sorrow (2013). Alongside the Twelfth Doctor, she featured in the novels The Blood Cell (2014), Silhouette (2014), The Crawling Terror (2014), Royal Blood (2015) and Deep Time (2015).

Clara featured in IDW Publishing's 2013 comic story "Deadwood". She appeared briefly in issues 11 and 12 of IDW 50th anniversary Doctor Who mini-series "Prisoners of Time". Beginning with Issue No. 462 (August 2013), she appeared regularly in the Doctor Who Magazine comic strips. In the 2015 Doctor Who Magazine comic storyline Blood and Ice (DWM #485–488), Clara meets another incarnation of herself called "Winnie Clarence", a university research graduate from the year 2048.

==== Video games ====
Coleman voiced Clara Oswald in the toys-to-life video game Lego Dimensions.

== Development ==
=== Casting ===
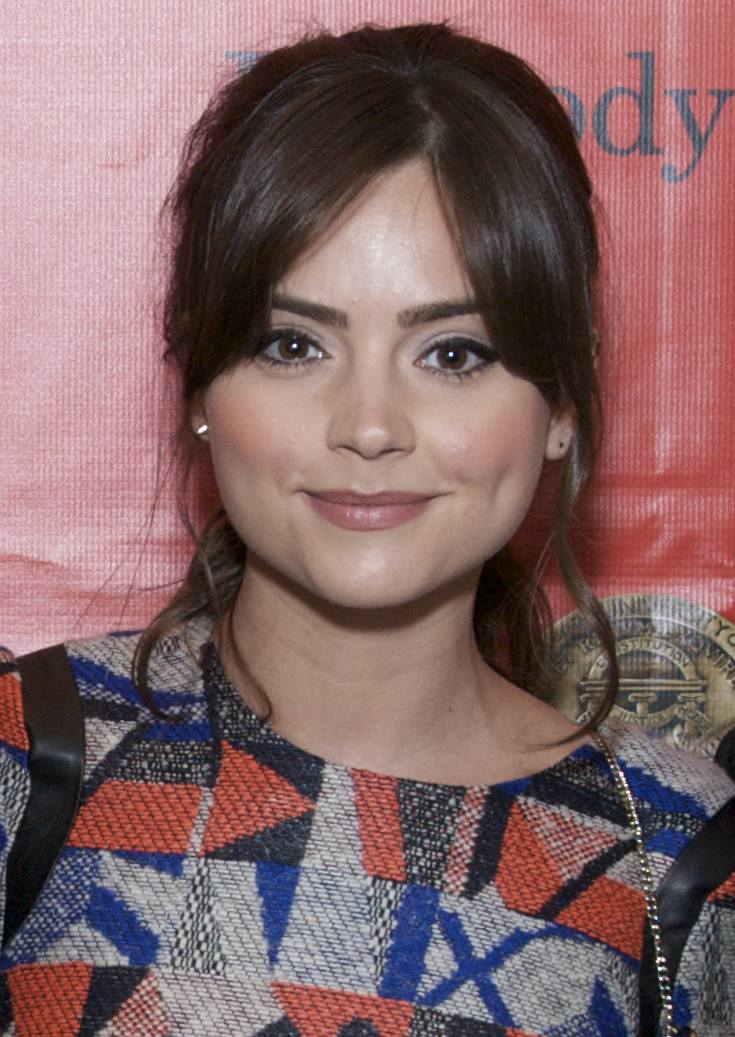
Jenna Coleman plays Clara Oswald.

With the upcoming departure of regular characters Amy Pond (Karen Gillan) and Rory Williams (Arthur Darvill) from the BBC television series Doctor Who, executive producer and lead writer Steven Moffat began developing a new female character to serve as the Eleventh Doctor (Matt Smith)'s companion. Auditions for the role were held in secrecy; the production was codenamed Men on Waves, an anagram for "Woman Seven". No scripts featuring the new companion had been written at the time that auditions took place, so Moffat wrote three new scenes, two of which were later included in episodes.

Around 45 actresses auditioned for the part over about five days, including Jenna Coleman. She had previously auditioned for the role of Mels (an incarnation of River Song) in the 2011 episode "Let's Kill Hitler". Coleman was unfamiliar with Doctor Who and had never seen the series before her audition; she watched "The Eleventh Hour" (2010) and "completely fell in love with the show". She only additionally watched the first five episodes of the seventh series – the final episodes featuring Gillan and Darvill – because she preferred to react "spontaneously" to Smith's performance.

In early 2012, while rewriting the series seven premiere "Asylum of the Daleks" (2012), Moffat developed a plan for the character Oswin, a former human who is revealed at the episode's end to be transformed into a delusional Dalek. Moffat decided that because Oswin's human form is never seen by the Doctor, the role could be played by the same actress as the new companion in a surprise twist for audiences. At the time of Coleman's initial audition, Moffat conceived the new companion as a bossy Victorian governess named Jasmine or Beryl. Moffat subsequently revised the companion to be a contemporary woman named Clara, and he developed the concept of Clara having multiple incarnations. At Coleman's second audition she read for both the characters of Oswin and Clara. Coleman assumed that this was indecisiveness on the part of the production team, later realising that her casting was part of Moffat's "soft mystery" plan. Coleman performed three auditions in total, the latter two with Matt Smith.

Coleman's casting was announced in March 2012. Moffat chose her for the role due to her chemistry with Smith and because she could talk faster than him. He also said that Coleman brings "a speed and wit and an unimpressed quality that makes the Doctor dance a bit harder... That's very much driven by Jenna’s particular style, which is very, very fast and snappy." Moffat concealed details of Coleman's character and told the media that she would debut in the 2012 Christmas special, but Coleman surprised viewers with her debut as Oswin Oswald in "Asylum of the Daleks". Oswin's death in the episode confused audiences as to how Coleman would return to play the Doctor's long-term companion. The mystery of her multiple characters was introduced to the series when Coleman reappeared in the 2012 Christmas special "The Snowmen" as the Victorian governess Clara Oswin Oswald. "Hide" (2013) was the first full episode Coleman shot as the modern incarnation of Clara. She played each incarnation of the character as individuals with "trust that there would be a payoff" to the mystery.

"I couldn't walk away with the story being unresolved [in series 8]. The arrival of the 12th Doctor has just kind of dropped this whole bombshell and allowed the dynamic to totally change, so I think just when Clara was feeling more comfortable in the relationship, it has suddenly thrown something new up."

— Coleman in 2015

From August 2014, various publications speculated that Coleman would leave the series at the end of the year, though Coleman and the BBC declined to comment. Coleman was originally to leave Doctor Who in the series 8 finale "Death in Heaven" (2014), which ends with Clara and the Doctor parting ways. However, Coleman and Moffat decided that Clara should return for the 2014 Christmas special. Moffat originally scripted the special, "Last Christmas", to end with Clara dying as an old woman. Coleman changed her mind in a conversation with Moffat after the read-through and stayed on for series 9, which suited Moffat's plans for the series. He didn't feel that the show was "quite finished with Jenna and Clara", and wasn't convinced Coleman was ready to depart the series; "I don’t think anyone should leave Doctor Who until they’re really ready to leave." Coleman stated in July 2015 that it "would have felt wrong to have left with only one year under my belt; with Peter [Capaldi] there was just more to do... there was just a lot more places to take the character". Prior to Coleman's decision, Moffat considered replacing Clara with Faye Marsay's character Shona from "Last Christmas".

On 18 September 2015, Coleman announced on Radio 1 Breakfast that she would leave the show at the end of the ninth series. The Guardian reported that she left the series partly to take on the lead role in the ITV drama series Victoria (2016–2019). At the time, this made Clara the longest-serving companion of the Doctor Who revival and one of the longest-serving companions in the series's history. On potentially reprising the role in a later episode, Coleman stated: "I think it would depend on the story... I think you'd have to be very careful about when and how to do it... if it was the right nature of the story, then I would love to. But we shall see."

Coleman reprised the role of Clara for a cameo appearance in the 2017 Christmas Special "Twice Upon a Time". Early drafts of the script had Clara interacting with fellow companions Nardole and Bill Potts, but Coleman's shooting schedule for Victoria prohibited this. Instead, Coleman shot her scenes in front of a green screen at the offices of the BBC Television Centre, days after filming wrapped. The episode's director Rachel Talalay described the story as being "about memories" and praised Moffat for weaving Clara into it: "The fact that the Doctor, having lost his memories of her, got them back in the Christmas episode, I just felt was so brilliant."

=== Characterisation ===
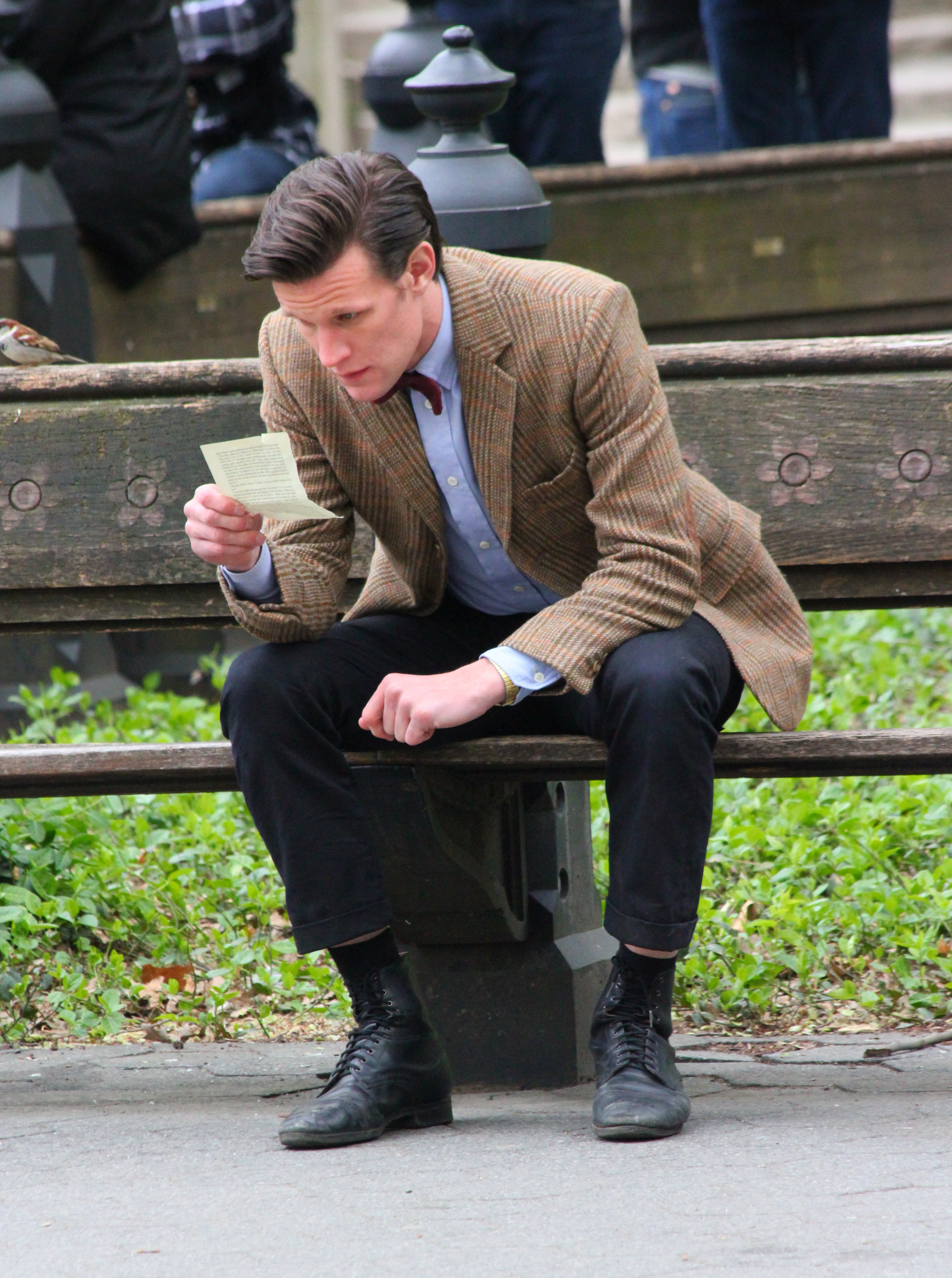
Clara Oswald was introduced as a companion of the Eleventh Doctor.

Moffat felt that the introduction of a new companion "sort of reboots [Doctor Who] a little bit" by offering a new perspective on the Doctor. Smith agreed that Clara allows the audience to "see a different side" to the Doctor. Executive producer Caroline Skinner remarked that Clara's introduction allowed the series to re-introduce common elements like the TARDIS, Time Lords and sonic screwdriver. Narratively, the character was intended to reawaken the Doctor's curiosity in the universe and "give him his mojo back" following the deaths of Amy and Rory.

Coleman stated that Clara "holds her own" with the Doctor, providing "a nice double act", and noted that her presence changed the Doctor: "There is a natural bounce between them, and a flirtation, and attraction. But, again, they've always got this friction because they're a bit magnetic and drawn to each other, but she can't quite figure him out." Coleman and Smith were influenced by the on-screen dynamic between Katharine Hepburn and Spencer Tracy. Coleman was glad that the character could be explored in greater depth once the "Impossible Girl" story arc had concluded.

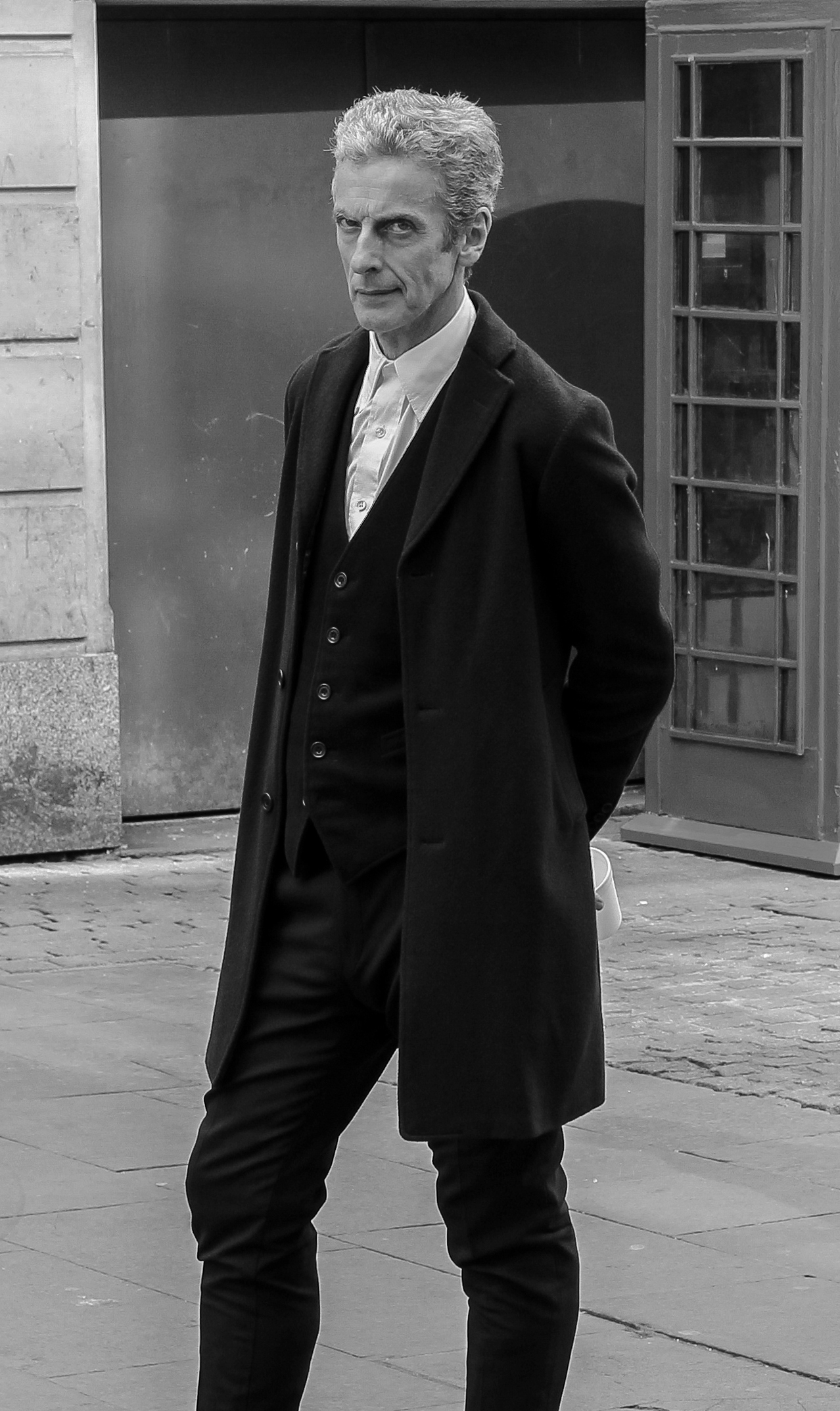
The eight and ninth series explored new elements of the relationship between Clara and the Twelfth Doctor.

In comparison to Clara's flirtatious dynamic with the Eleventh Doctor, the physically older Twelfth Doctor tells Clara "I'm not your boyfriend" in his debut episode "Deep Breath" (2014). Prior to the broadcast of series 8, Capaldi told The Sunday Times Magazine: "There'll be no flirting [with Clara], that's for sure... It's not what this Doctor’s concerned with. It’s quite a fun relationship, but no, I did call and say, 'I want no Papa-Nicole moments'." In 2015, Moffat indicated that the Doctor was still "besotted" with Clara. At the 2015 San Diego Comic Con, Capaldi stated the Doctor is "deeply bonded" with Clara in a "very unusual relationship". He added: "It's romantic in the old sense. Two people who are really crazy about each other, and would really miss not seeing each other. But they're not romantically involved." Coleman felt that Clara has "more of a turbulent relationship" with the Twelfth Doctor than the Eleventh, stating "he brings out the control freak in Clara because she can't quite pin him down."

Coleman felt that series 8's stronger focus on Clara's home life made the character more accessible and relatable to audiences, and described Clara and the Doctor as "a bit addicted" to their co-dependent dynamic. After Danny's death, Coleman noted that Clara lost her fear of mortality and increasingly cut her ties with Earth, making her increasingly reckless. Coleman described Clara in series 9 as "more Doctor-like". Series director Rachel Talalay defended Clara's characterisation from fan criticisms that she was "too important" to the narrative of the series, stating that "it's nice to have a companion who is strong, and flawed, and more rounded". Talalay described Clara as possessing greater depth than companion characters introduced in the 1960s. The series somewhat responded to criticisms in "Death in Heaven", when, after Clara impersonates the Doctor in the pre-titles sequence, Coleman is given first billing over Capaldi.

Dialogue in "The Magician's Apprentice" (2015), "The Girl Who Died" (2015) and "Face the Raven" (2015) implied that Clara was bisexual. Coleman stated in September 2015 that "it is open to interpretation"; it was confirmed in a 2023 issue of Doctor Who Magazine.

== Reception ==
Nick Setchfield of SFX praised Coleman's surprise debut as Oswin in "Asylum of the Daleks", writing "Coleman brings sauce and sparkiness, and while she initially seems a familiar Moffat archetype, all snarky cracks about the Doctor's chin and throwaway lines about sexual experimentation... there's a deeper vulnerability there too, which makes her eventual fate in this episode genuinely heart-skewering." Michael Hogan, writing for The Daily Telegraph, also found her debut promising and described her as "enchanting in an elfin way – rather like a brunette, curvier, less annoying Fearne Cotton." Coleman's reintroduction in "The Snowmen" received generally positive reviews from critics. The Guardian's Dan Martin noted that Coleman's surprise introduction "made us want to see more of her before Karen Gillan had even gone. The cheeky, self-assured Clara won a place in our hearts from the off." Setchfield called the Victorian incarnation of Clara "less of a motormouthed quip-merchant than [Oswin], but Coleman makes her equally winning – plucky, smart and riffing on a very promising chemistry with Matt Smith." IGN's Matt Risley felt that Coleman "trumped her already-bombastic debut" with the Victorian version of the character. He also praised the mystery surrounding her as well as her independence: "While we'll always love Amy, Clara seems her antithesis - this is a girl who'll wait for no-one." Radio Times reviewer Patrick Mulkern admitted that he "found Oswin's perkiness a tad wearing," but he was "completely won over" by Coleman's Clara in "The Snowmen". Neela Debnath of The Independent felt that Clara's demise in "The Snowmen" made the episode "a bit of a tease" for the subsequent version of Clara. Unlike Mulkern, she favoured the "much more fun and flirtatious" Oswin.

Following "The Bells of Saint John", Digital Spy's Morgan Jeffery described the new Clara as "more grounded and so far easier for the viewer to latch on to" than her two predecessors, both of whom could have been harder to sustain as long-term companions. Mulkern was pleased that Coleman played her as "a straightforward modern companion with no baggage." Setchfield described Clara as "equally sparky and winning" but younger and slightly more vulnerable than the previous incarnations. He praised her "helplessly watchable chemistry" with Smith. Mike Higgins of The Independent felt that Coleman was "an improvement" upon Gillan, but wrote that "the pairing of an intellectually bright but emotionally dim male with a techno-illiterate but wised up female is a tired old trope of much drama and comedy." Debnath hoped for Clara to "be taken up a notch, challenging the Doctor more and bouncing off him like Oswin did." The "Impossible Girl" mystery was speculated on by critics.

Clara's development throughout series 7 was met with positive reviews. Martin praised the development of her backstory in "The Rings of Akhaten" as otherwise the character "was danger of becoming simply a story arc in the shape of a girl." Fans and critics noticed similarities between Clara and the Doctor's earlier companion Rose Tyler (Billie Piper), as both companions help the Doctor recover at a dark point in his life and have a particularly close relationship with the Doctor. SFX's Richard Edwards wrote that she had the potential to be "a truly great companion," and that it was "refreshing to see a companion who isn't in total awe of the Doctor... and she's not afraid to take the lead when she needs to." Debnath praised her "caring nature" and "lovely maternal side," but felt that she could be "annoyingly naïve." Dave Golder of SFX stated that Clara was "to an extent, a bit of a cartoon character" and that Moffat was better at writing her in "The Name of the Doctor" than some of the preceding writers. He also commented that she "still feels too new a companion (and an underdeveloped one) to really care about her sacrifice." Both Maya Philips of Vulture and Dan Martin criticised Clara's "Impossible Girl" arc for reducing her to a "Manic Pixie Dream Girl". In Jared Aronoff's 2017 article Deconstructing Clara Who. A Female Doctor Made Possible by an Impossible Girl, he noted that "Clara has her agency stolen by the narrative of the show itself... with her actual character buried" in the "common trope" of "Woman-as-Mystery", but that the resolution of the arc allowed her to claim agency. Martin said Coleman "first truly shone" in "The Day of the Doctor" (2013) after the arc had completed. Doctor Who writer Jonathan Morris agreed that her status as "an unsolved puzzle... limited her characterisation" and described her as "another Clara" from "The Day of the Doctor" onwards.

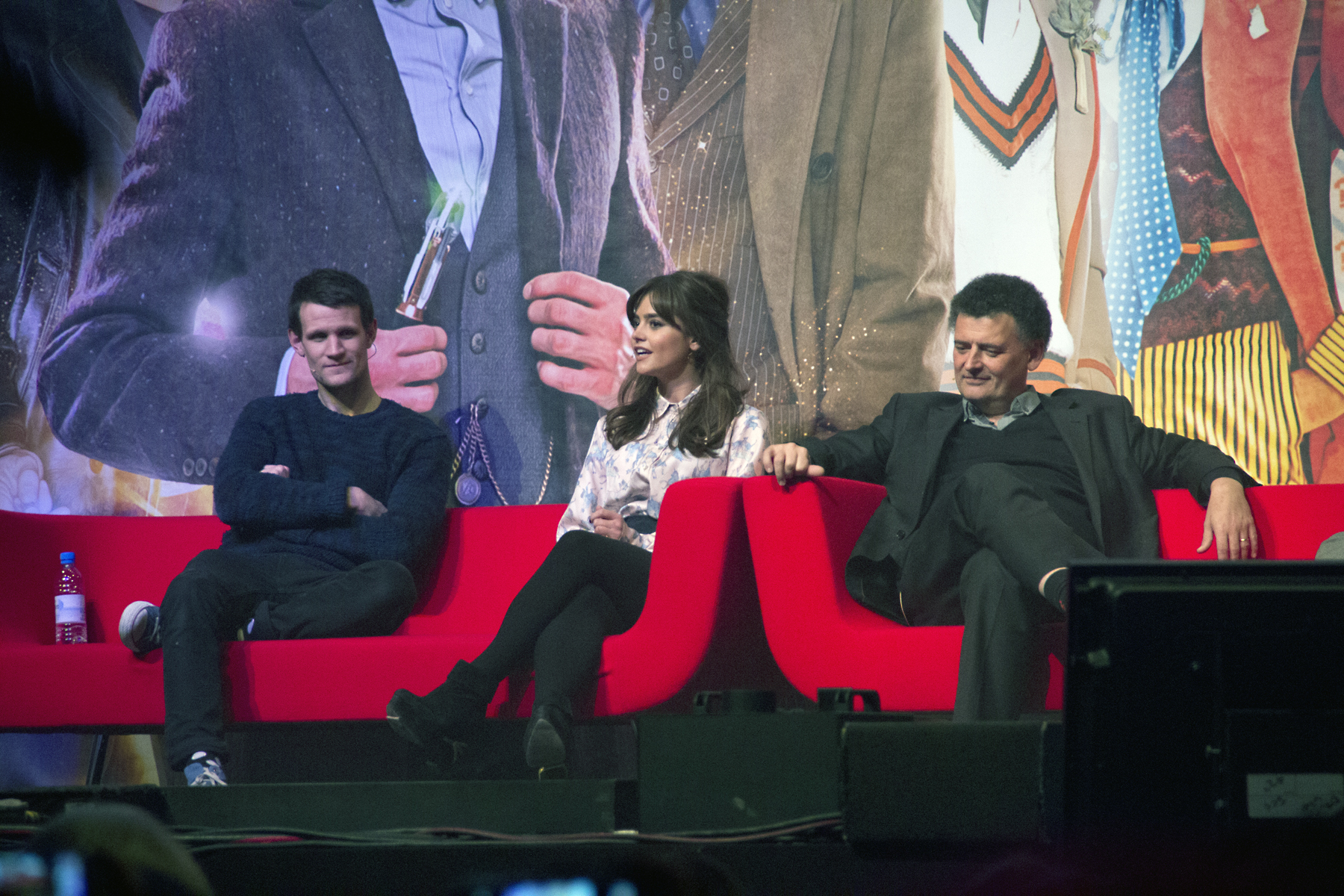
From left: Matt Smith, Coleman and Steven Moffat promoting Doctor Who at the 50th Anniversary Celebration Weekend in 2013

In an essay in the book Being a Girl with The Doctor: Essays on the Feminine in Doctor Who (2023), Heather M. McHale noted that Clara's lack of character development in series 7 can be explained as all three incarnations of Clara are "powerful manipulators of their image" who mask their true self from the world, and argued that Clara's subsequent character development was satisfying for both her and the Doctor. Doctor Who critic Elizabeth Sandifer stated that the series 8 premiere "Deep Breath" (2014) "sets out to be a clear and definitive statement on who Clara is", and noted that though critics perceived "Deep Breath" as presenting a "new take or reboot of Clara", it maintains her "control freak" personality. Aronoff argued that Clara's initial lack of character flaws is intentional as she is a "highly internal character" in series 7 who seeks desperately to hide her vanity and domineering behaviour. Thus, viewers may not readily recognise many of these character traits which are more explicitly apparent in series 8 and 9. Martin praised the development of Clara's home life in series 8 and described Clara as one of the strongest aspects of the series. He expressed support for Coleman to remain in Doctor Who beyond 2014.

Aronoff argued that, with the series consistently prioritising her character development, Clara was positioned as the driving force of the narrative. He also praised the "compelling" co-dependent relationship between Clara and the Twelfth Doctor, which was narratively condemned in a way that earlier toxic Doctor-companion relationships were not. Aimee Hart of Polygon praised the dynamic between Capaldi and Coleman throughout their two seasons. Aronoff argued that Clara initially played into heteronormative tropes of the companion, particularly those established by Rose Tyler, through her bubbly personality and flirtatious relationship with the Eleventh Doctor. However, he stated that, in the context of series eight and nine, this characterisation can be retrospectively read as a deconstruction of those tropes. Clara's relationship with the Twelfth Doctor was based on an intimate but platonic bond, while her growing imperfections and queer characteristics further departed from traditional expectations of the companion role. McHale stated that Clara emerges "not only as a more equal partner to the Doctor, but as similar to the Doctor—for better and for worse". Morris felt Clara "came into her own" once she was paired with the Twelfth Doctor, adding, "Steven [Moffat] gave us the first female Doctor. She was hidden in clear view all the time. And her name was Clara Oswald." However, Clara was also criticised by fans for being "too important" to the narrative of the series, giving rise to the reactionary colloquialism "Clara Who".

Kashann Kilson of Inverse praised the subversive and surprising nature of Clara's "anticlimactic" death in "Face the Raven" (2015). Jeffrey praised the episode for its fitting conclusion to Clara's character arc, as well as for being surprising and emotional. Kelly Connolly of Entertainment Weekly agreed that Clara's death concluded her character arc but stated that there was "still something hollow in it". She noted that "Jenna Coleman managed to make Clara feel as essential to the show as the Doctor was to Clara". Caitlin Busch of Inverse noted that Clara's resurrection and newfound immortality in "Hell Bent" (2015) left the character open to returning.

In 2015, Martin stated that Clara’s implied bisexuality was "one of the most compelling facets of the character", arguing that it aligned with Clara's established personality and praised it as a subtle form of LGBT representation on television. Danny Nicol in the 2020 article "Doctor Who, Family and National Identity" noted that Clara's apparent bisexuality highlights modern Doctor Who's depiction of diverse companions. He argued that Clara's departure with Ashildr carries romantic undertones, giving Clara a post-TARDIS family that reflects the spirit of modern British same-sex legislation. Aronoff argued that this queer reading of Clara is supported by similarities with lesbian companion Bill Potts (Pearl Mackie) in the following series, who also leaves the Doctor to travel the universe with an immortal woman. In the book Being a Girl with The Doctor, Lynnette Porter noted that although viewers identified Clara as bisexual, her orientation was never the focus of the plot or her character development.

In 2018, Philips placed Clara last in a ranking of the revived series's companions. She criticised Clara's "poorly executed" story arc, and stated that Clara stayed on the series for too long. She stated that Clara "became most interesting... when she became reckless in her grief and overconfident in her own abilities". Rachel Leishman of The Mary Sue praised Clara for her bravery and as a positive on-screen depiction of teachers, though noted that the character received a mixed reception from audiences. McHale noted Clara's strong significance to the Doctor's emotional history due to "her role in driving the Doctor's own moral reflections". Moffat's predecessor as executive producer, Russell T Davies, praised the character's reversal of the companion's tropes: "Nestling at the heart of the show is Doctor Who’s very own problem category, the Companion, a title inherently subordinate to the Man. Until Clara comes along! Companion to every single moment in the Doctor’s life. A woman so strong that in her first appearance, and her last, Death itself cannot stop her." Aronoff agreed that Clara subverted the role of the companion to a greater degree than previous characters. He argued that Clara possessed a degree of self-awareness of her diegetic role in Doctor Who's narrative, which was used to expose the historically limited role of companions. This contributed to a broader evolution in the representation of women in Doctor Who such as the casting of Jodie Whittaker as the Thirteenth Doctor. Aronoff also noted the significant contributions of Jamie Mathieson (writer of "Flatline") and Rachel Talalay (director of "Dark Water"/"Death in Heaven") to Clara's characterisation.

=== Accolades ===
Coleman was nominated for numerous awards for her portrayal of Clara Oswald. She won the 2014 Glamour Award for UK TV Actress. At the 41st Saturn Awards, she was nominated for Best Supporting Actress in a Television Series. For her performance in "Kill the Moon", Coleman was nominated for the 2015 BAFTA Cymru Award for Best Actress. In both 2013 and 2015, she was nominated for Best Actress at the TV Quick Awards.
