= Klokkenluider =

2022 British dark comedy film

- Directed by: Neil Maskell
- Written by: Neil Maskell
- Produced by: Helen Simmons; Stephanie Aspin
- Starring: Amit Shah; Sura Dohnke; Tom Burke; Roger Evans; Jenna Coleman
- Cinematography: Nick Gillespie
- Edited by: Jason Rayton
- Music by: Andy Shortwave
- Production companies: Erebus Pictures; Rook Films; MarVista Entertainment; Endeavor Content
- Release dates: 9 September 2022 (TIFF); 1 September 2023 (UK)
- Running time: 84 minutes
- Country: United Kingdom
- Language: English

Klokkenluider (Note: The Dutch word Klokkenluider literally translates to "bell ringer" but is used to refer to a whistleblower.) is a 2022 British dark comedy film written and directed by Neil Maskell, and starring Amit Shah, Sura Dohnke, Tom Burke, Roger Evans, and Jenna Coleman.

The film premiered at the 2022 Toronto International Film Festival on 9 September 2022 as part of series of private screenings for film distributors, and had its first public screening for the 2022 edition of the BFI London Film Festival in October 2022. It was released in the United Kingdom on 1 September 2023.

== Cast ==
- Amit Shah as Ewan
- Sura Dohnke as Silke
- Tom Burke as Chris
- Roger Evans as Glynn
- Jenna Coleman as Flo
- Dominic Mallett as Soldier

== Production ==
In February 2021, it was announced that Jenna Coleman and Tom Burke would lead the cast of Klokkenluider, the directorial debut of actor Neil Maskell.

Principal photography in Sussex ran from 28 February to 18 April 2021.

== Reception ==
On the review aggregator website Rotten Tomatoes, 92% of 13 critics' reviews are positive, with an average rating of 7.0/10.
