= Almería Western Film Festival =

Annual film festival held in Tabernas, Spain

- Event logo (2022–present)
- Location: Tabernas, Almería, Spain
- Founded: 2011
- Hosted by: City of Tabernas
- Festival date: Early to mid-October
- Language: English, Spanish
- Website: almeriawesternfilmfestival.es

The Almería Western Film Festival is an annual film festival held every October in the Spanish city of Tabernas in the province of Almería. The event was created in 2011 to celebrate Almería's ongoing history as one of the Western genre's iconic shooting locations. As of 2024, the AWFF lays claim to being the only festival dedicated to the genre in Europe. It is a member of the Andalusian Association of Audiovisual Festivals (ASFAAN).

== History ==
Tabernas Municipal Theater
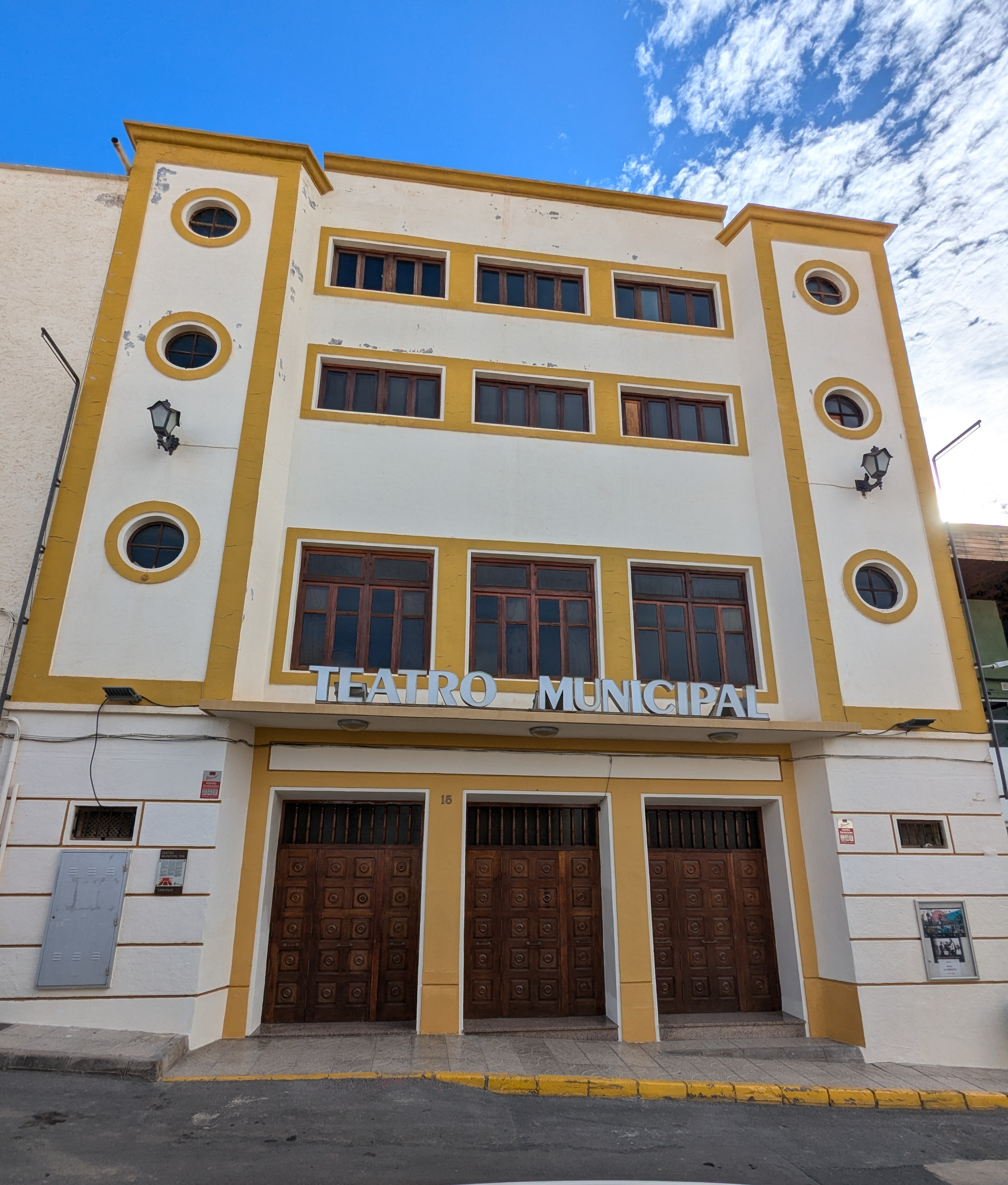
- Tabernas Municipal Theater in 2024
- Address: Calle Rodriguez Carmona, 2–22; Tabernas, Almería; Spain
- Owner: City of Tabernas
- Capacity: 499

Construction
- Opened: 1959
- Renovated: 2002
- Architect: Antonio Góngora Galera

=== Host city ===
Almería has been a backdrop for films of multiple genres, but it is particularly associated with Westerns, of which more than 170 had been filmed there as of 2022. Among the most famous are Sergio Leone's Dollar Trilogy, Terence Hill and Bud Spencer's original trilogy, many Zorro adaptations including the 1975 Alain Delon starrer, the pilot of the 1990 TV series and the 2024 Paramount+ miniseries, as well as the meta film 800 Bullets, which is set in the Almería Western industry.

The host city of Tabernas is the main settlement in the Tabernas Desert, where many exteriors for these films have been shot. Three historic Western sets are located nearby: Fort Bravo, Mini Hollywood and Western Leone. The inaugural edition was organized in partnership with Fort Bravo, but subsequent ones have involved the area's other studios as well. The festival's main downtown venue is the Tarbernas Municipal Theater, and supporting attractions take place in the city's public squares, such as the Glorieta de España. The 2024 edition was attended by 7,600 persons.

=== Organizers ===
The festival was founded in 2011 by private citizens and Western enthusiasts César Méndez and Danny García, who actually hailed from Catalonia and invested €30,000 to kickstart the proceedings. The city upped its support and the provincial government jumped on board in the gathering's sophomore year, when it moved from September to its current October spot.

In 2014, control of the AWFF was wrested away from its founders by then Tabernas mayor Mari Nieves Jaén, who wished to secure her city's rights over the event after the former had made overtures to San José de Níjar and the provincial capital of Almería City to relocate parts of the festivities there. Méndez and García vouched to refrain from legal action, but kept the existing logo and launched the rival Almería International Western Film Festival, which took place at the es:Teatro Apolo in Almería City in September 2014. However, it did not last beyond that one edition.

=== Traditions ===
The festival traditionally kicks off with a parade through the streets of Tabernas, featuring period dress, horse carriages and children from the area's schools. Western-themed exhibits, panels, and live performances supplement the screenings. The inaugural musical guest was Dave Bourne, the pianist from the series Deadwood. Kirkpatrick Thomas of Spindrift accompanied a showing of their musical film Ghost of the West during the 2014 edition, and came back with the band to open their 2017 European tour.

Since 2012, one of festival's main attractions has been the Premio Tabernas de Cine ('Tabernas Film Prize'), given each year to one or several distinguished contributors to the genre. Each laureate gets to unveil a forged metal chair—in the shape of a film chair—bearing their name, which is then displayed alongside those of previous honorees on the Paseo Tabernas de Cine, a dedicated section of the city's main artery, Avenida de Las Angustias.

In 2016, the career award was splintered into two categories, with the Premio Tabernas de Cine now reserved for living personalities, while a separate award was introduced for figures who have died, called Premio Leone in Memoriam ('Leone Memorial Prize'). The latter is presented to the recipient's relatives at Mini Hollywood, which houses sets used on the director's For a Few Dollars More. In the award's first years, the function took place at the venue's saloon. In 2021, an Old West cemetery was recreated on the lot to host the ceremony, and each laureate is now commemorated with a prop grave to his name, which the fans can help dig and decorate with candles.

== Main awards history ==
| Year | Best Film | Audience Award | Best Actor | Best Actress | Premio Tabernas de Cine (career award, contemporary) | Premio Leone in Memoriam (career award, posthumous) |
|---|---|---|---|---|---|---|
| 2024 | The Dead Don't Hurt | Sergio Leone: The Italian Who Invented America | C. Thomas Howell for Ride | Mireia Vilapuig for Escanyapobres | Fabio Testi | Sergio Leone |
| 2023 | Godland | Call Me Mule | Elliott Crosset Hove for Godland | | José Luis Alcaine | Joaquín Romero Marchent; Rafael Romero Marchent |
| 2022 | Utama | The Long Rider | Luis Zahera for The Beasts | Marina Foïs for The Beasts | Gianni Garko | Bud Spencer |
| 2021 | Old Henry | Karnawal | Tim Blake Nelson for Old Henry | Diane Lane for Let Him Go | Franco Nero | Ennio Morricone |
| 2020 | Savage State | The Dutchman | John Cusack for Never Grow Old | Sônia Braga for Bacurau | Ángel del Pozo | Sergio Sollima |
| 2019 | The Sisters Brothers | Infierno grande | John C. Reilly for The Sisters Brothers | Marián Álvarez for The Silent War | Alex Cox | George Hilton |
| 2018 | Brimstone | Dead Men | Abigail Eiland for Cassidy Red | | Claudia Cardinale; Sal Borghese | Carlo Simi |
| 2017 | Hell or High Water | Escape from Patagonia | Shakib Ben Omar for Mimosas | | Alberto Dell'Acqua; George Martin | Tomás Milian |
| 2016 | The Salvation | Red Clouds | Francesca Eastwood for Outlaws and Angels | | Terence Hill | Fernando Sancho |
| Year | Best Film | Audience Award | | | Premio Tabernas de Cine (career award) | |
| 2015 | Pueblo viejo | The Homesman | | | Sancho Gracia (In Memoriam) | |
| 2014 | Sweetwater | Algo más que morir | | | Enzo G. Castellari; Giuliano Gemma (In Memoriam) | |
| 2014 | 6 Bullets to Hell | La flor de lis | | | Juan Manuel Torres Gómez | |
| 2013 | Django Unchained | West of Thunder | | | Mónica Randall | |
| 2012 | Sal | The Legend of Hell's Gate: An American Conspiracy | | | Sara Montiel | |
| 2011 | Six Shooters | The Warrior's Way | | | | |

Breakaway event held in Almería City due to a dispute between the festival's founders and the Tabernas municipality. Thus, the career award won by Juan Manuel Torres Gómez (third-generation stuntman and president of the Almería Stuntmen Association) omitted the name of Tabernas.
