= Kuartango =

- Municipality
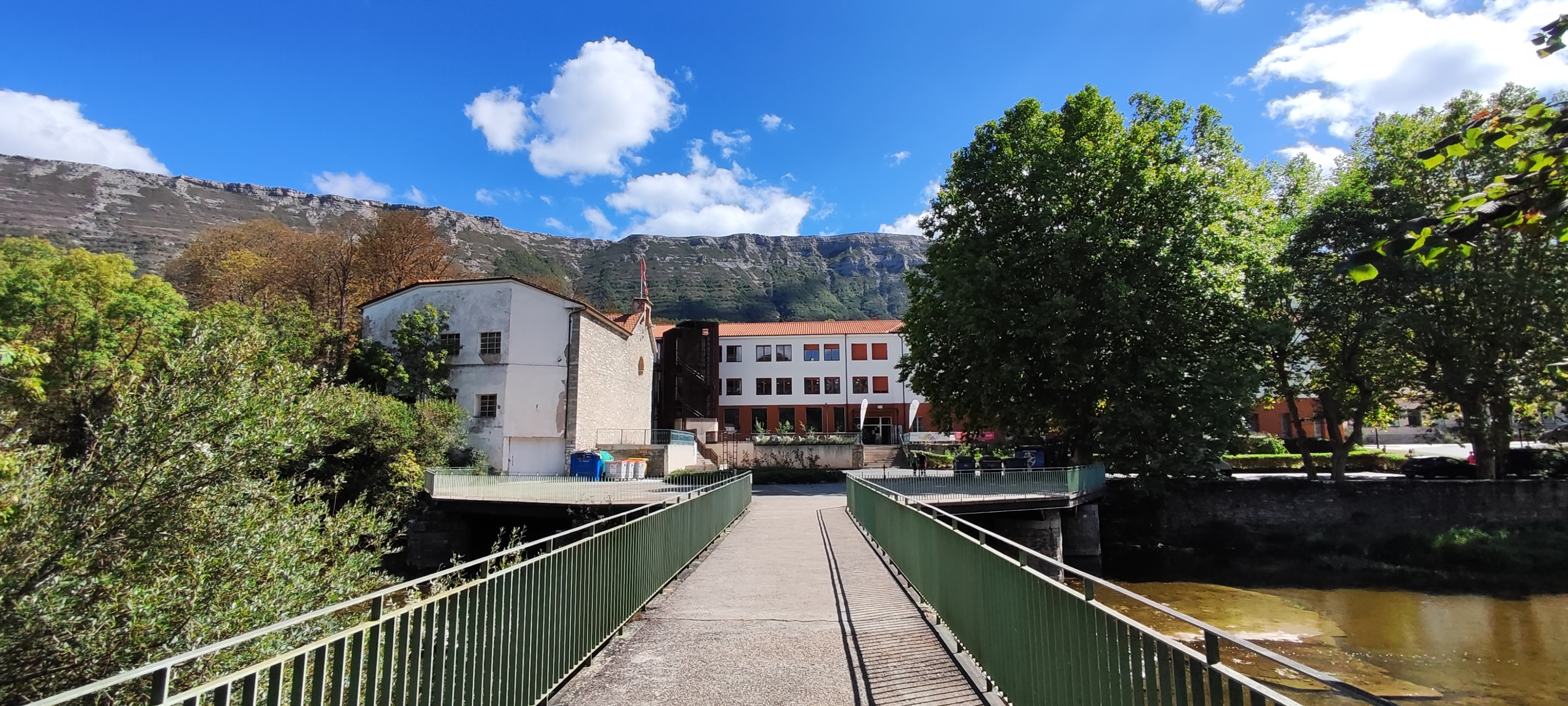
- Zuhatzu Kuartango

- Coat of arms

- Location of Kuartango within the Basque Country
- Coordinates: 42°52′17″N 2°53′08″W
- Country: Spain
- Autonomous Community: Basque Country
- Province: Álava
- Comarca: Cuadrilla de Añana

Government
  - Mayor: Eduardo Fernández de Pinedo

Area
  - Total: 84.39 km^{2} (32.58 sq mi)
- Elevation (AMSL): 580 m (1,900 ft)

Population (2025-01-01)
  - Total: 402
  - Density: 4.76/km^{2} (12.3/sq mi)
- Time zone: UTC+1 (CET)
  - Summer (DST): UTC+2 (CEST (GMT +2))
- Postal code: 01430

Kuartango (Basque and official name. Spanish: Cuartango) is a town and municipality located in the province of Álava, in the Basque Country, northern Spain. The Spanish western film Algo más que morir was shot in Kuartango.
