= A Town Called Mercy =

Episode of Doctor Who

228 – "A Town Called Mercy"
- Doctor Who episode
- The cybernetic Gunslinger (Andrew Brooke) points his weapon at the Doctor (Matt Smith). Writer Toby Whithouse wanted the Gunslinger to be sympathetic and the design to be reminiscent of Frankenstein's monster.

Cast
- Doctor: Matt Smith – Eleventh Doctor
- Companions: Karen Gillan – Amy Pond; Arthur Darvill – Rory Williams
- Others: Ben Browder – Isaac; Adrian Scarborough – Kahler-Jex; Dominic Kemp – Kahler-Mas; Rob Cavazos – Walter; Joanne McQuinn – Sadie; Andrew Brooke – The Gunslinger; Garrick Hagon – Abraham; Byrd Wilkins – The Preacher; Sean Benedict – Dockery

Production
- Directed by: Saul Metzstein
- Written by: Toby Whithouse
- Produced by: Marcus Wilson
- Executive producers: Steven Moffat; Caroline Skinner
- Music by: Murray Gold
- Series: Series 7
- Running time: 45 minutes
- First broadcast: 15 September 2012

Chronology
← Preceded by "Dinosaurs on a Spaceship"	Followed by → "The Power of Three"

"A Town Called Mercy" is the third episode of the seventh series of the British science fiction television series Doctor Who, transmitted on BBC One in the United Kingdom on 15 September 2012. It was written by Toby Whithouse and directed by Saul Metzstein.

The episode featured alien time traveller the Doctor (Matt Smith) and his companions Amy Pond (Karen Gillan) and Rory Williams (Arthur Darvill) visiting the Wild West, where they encounter a town which is cut off from the rest of the frontier until they hand over Kahler-Jex, an alien doctor, to a cyborg called the Gunslinger. However, the Gunslinger is a product of experiments by Jex to win a civil war on his planet, and the Doctor is unsure of what is the right thing to do.

Showrunner Steven Moffat pitched the Wild West theme to Whithouse when thinking of ways to give each episode a distinct theme. Whithouse further developed the theme, including classic Western tropes and a sympathetic villain. "A Town Called Mercy" and the previous episode "Dinosaurs on a Spaceship" were the first to enter production for the seventh series. Much of the episode was filmed in March 2012 in the desert area of Almería, Spain, in Mini Hollywood and Fort Bravo, locations used for many Western-set films. Reviewers noted that the episode addressed a moral debate. "A Town Called Mercy" was watched by 8.42 million viewers in the UK. Critical reception was generally positive, with some critical of the Doctor's actions and pacing.

== Plot ==
=== Prequel ===
A prequel to "A Town Called Mercy" was released exclusively onto iTunes, and titled "The Making of The Gunslinger". It depicts the actual making and formation of the Gunslinger, from a normal humanoid body. It also has an explanation of the making of the Gunslinger in voice-over by Kahler-Jex.

=== Synopsis ===
The Eleventh Doctor, Amy and Rory arrive at the American Frontier town of Mercy. They find that no one has been able to leave or enter town due to "The Gunslinger", who demands they turn over the doctor, who transpires to be Kahler-Jex, an alien scientist that crashed to Earth years earlier. The townspeople rescued him, and in exchange, he provided them with primitive electricity and the means to stop a cholera outbreak. The town's marshal, Isaac, is hesitant of turning over his friend to the Gunslinger, despite being near the end of their supplies.

The Doctor sneaks out to get the TARDIS but finds Jex's crashed ship and discovers he was one of several scientists that did inhumane experiments to create cyborgs on their war-torn homeworld. The Gunslinger arrives, and confirms the Doctor's theory that he is one of Jex's experiments. He has sought vengeance and killed all but Jex. Though he cannot harm innocents by his programming, the Gunslinger warns that Jex must be brought to him or he will take more drastic measures.

The Doctor returns to town, and angrily drags Jex to face the Gunslinger. Amy asserts that the Doctor has changed for the worse from months of travelling on his own. Jex pleads that he has atoned, but the cyborg prepares to kill him. Isaac pushes Jex out of the way and takes the lethal shot. As he dies, Isaac gives the Doctor his marshal badge and has him promise to protect Mercy. The Gunslinger departs, warning he will return for Jex at noon tomorrow.

Jex tells the Doctor he is remorseful for all those deaths his work has caused. The townsfolk demand the Doctor turn Jex over, but he reminds them that Isaac's death will be for naught if they do so, and has come up with a plan from learning about Jex's society. When the Gunslinger arrives the next day, residents wearing facial markings similar to Jex race through town, confusing the cyborg and allowing Jex to flee to his ship. However, instead of taking off, Jex tells the Doctor he is ready to face justice in the afterlife, and causes the ship to self-destruct.

The Gunslinger, having no further purpose, prepares to travel a distance away from the town to self-destruct, but the Doctor suggests a new role for him. As the Doctor, Amy and Rory leave, the Gunslinger stands watch over Mercy as its new marshal.

== Production ==
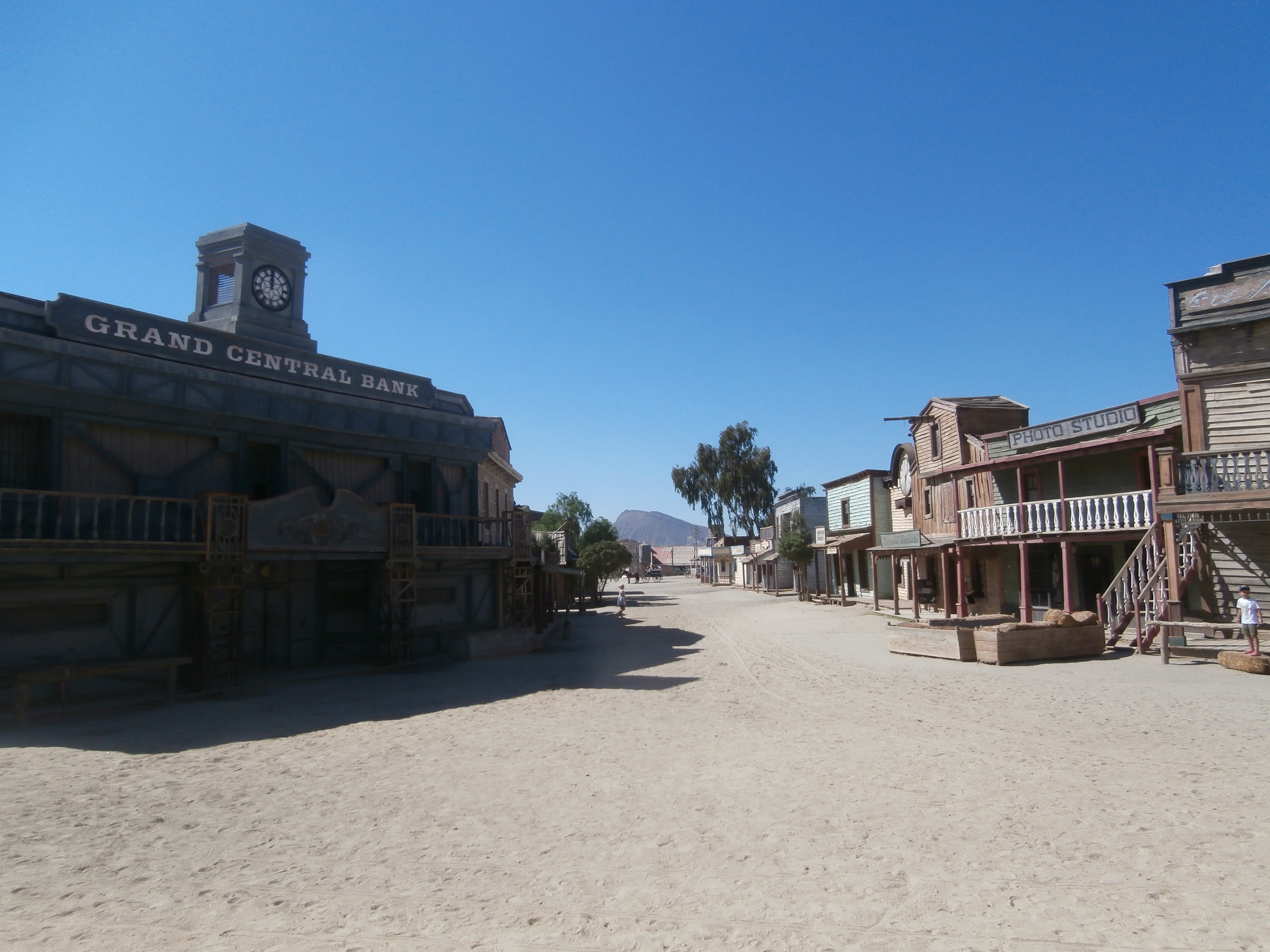

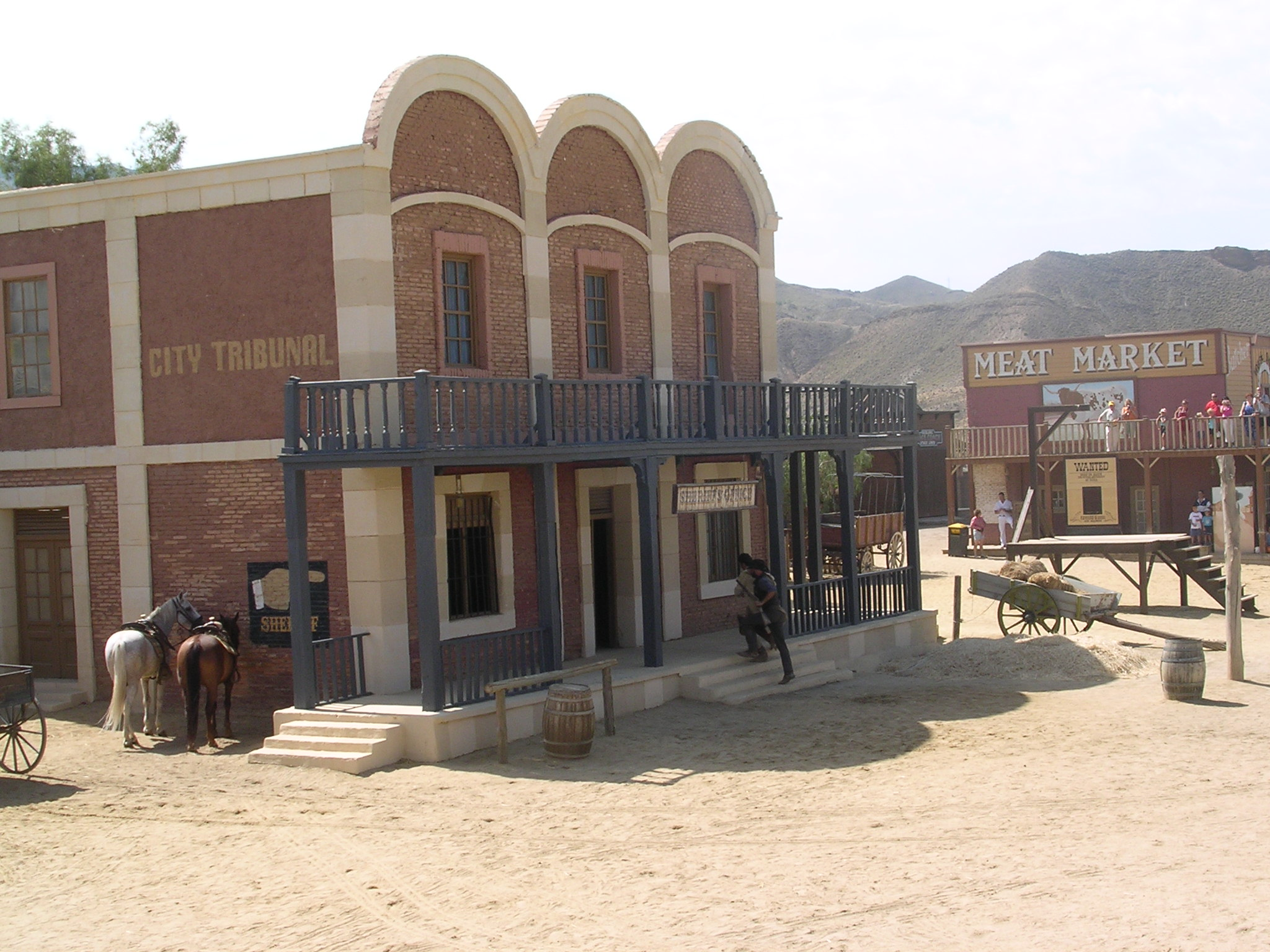
Much of the episode was filmed at Fort Bravo (top) and Oasys theme parks (bottom), both Western mock-up sites in Spain.

In looking to give each episode of the series a distinct feel, showrunner Steven Moffat pitched the Wild West theme to writer Toby Whithouse, suggesting that the episode could be about a town terrorised by a robot. Moffat was keen on putting Matt Smith in a Western setting, who he called one of the last people one would expect to replace Clint Eastwood. Whithouse had previously written the Doctor Who episodes "School Reunion" (2006), "The Vampires of Venice" (2010), and "The God Complex" (2011). Moffat had been planning for the first five episodes of the series to have "movie marquee" themes. Whithouse noted that it was a genre he had not written before, but he "absolutely [loved] it". The Wild West has not been a setting for a Doctor Who episode since the 1966 third season serial The Gunfighters. Whithouse was advised not to watch The Gunfighters by the other writers, who said it was "not exactly the jewel in the crown". Whithouse felt obliged to include common Western tropes, such as the Doctor riding a horse and a face-off. He stated the hardest scene to write was where the Doctor is forced to use a gun; the Doctor is a pacifist and he would need "the right sort of emotional journey".

Whithouse preferred the cyborg villain to be three-dimensional and sympathetic, which would require it to have a "living consciousness" rather than simply be a "soulless automaton". He wanted its look to be reminiscent of Frankenstein's monster, and later called the design "fantastic". It took about three and a half hours to apply all the makeup to Andrew Brooke. Due to the costume, Brooke had to act with just his left eye. Smith praised guest actors Ben Browder, who he said "[made] a good cowboy" with "that great drawl", and Adrian Scarborough, who he said "steals the whole episode". Browder was offered the role and gladly accepted; he was aware of the show as his children had watched it, and he also wanted to do a western. Whithouse was "thrilled" with Browder's performance, as it was how he imagined the character.

"A Town Called Mercy" and the previous episode, "Dinosaurs on a Spaceship", were the first episodes to be produced for the seventh series, and both were directed by Saul Metzstein. The two episodes are Metzstein's first Doctor Who credits. Much of the episode was filmed around the desert area of Almería, Spain, where studios have built Wild West-style streets that have been used in the making of over 100 Western-set films, such as A Fistful of Dollars. Filming the episode in Spain was cheaper than constructing a set in the UK. Moffat stated, "We knew from the start we need some serious location shooting for this one, and given the most iconic American setting imaginable, there was only one place to go – Spain." They reportedly filmed there from 8 March to 17 March 2012. Filming took place at Oasys/Mini Hollywood, and Fort Bravo/Texas Hollywood. While Smith was allowed to try riding the horse, most of the action shown in the episode was done by his stuntman. Composer Murray Gold mimicked Western-style scores when creating the music for the episode.

== Themes ==
"I think one can find a take-home religious message in the church scene. What saves lives is not frantic prayers in the midst of a terrifying crisis. It is the teaching of people to value lives consistently on a day to day basis. When that is done, even a war-scarred vengeance-seeker may avoid taking innocent lives. When such things are ignored, then even without a cyborg in our midst we will destroy one another in a scramble to save ourselves and ensure our own safety."

— James F. McGrath on one of the episode's moral messages.

James F. McGrath of the religious website Patheos found that "A Town Called Mercy" had strong religious themes and moral messages, writing that it "really is about mercy, about forgiveness, about war crimes, about vengeance, and about justice". He interpreted Amy's comment about how the Doctor's behaviour was due to his being alone for too long to mean that "when we loosen our ties to other human beings, we can begin to treat matters of mercy and justice, and the fate of other persons, differently, impersonally". McGrath also noted a "take-home religious message" in the scene near the end where the town gathers in the church while the Gunslinger and the Doctor face off; he felt that it emphasised the importance of valuing human life.

Gavin Fuller of The Daily Telegraph wrote that the Western concept was "effectively window-dressing for Toby Whithouse's powerful morality tale, where not everything was quite as it seemed and went on to explore issues of morality, ethics, conscience and justice". The A.V. Club reviewer Keith Phipps noted that the "never-ending struggle between order and chaos" was common in Westerns, and the episode represented this with the question of "what should win out: Lawless revenge or civilized justice?". Ian Berriman of SFX interpreted the border around Mercy as a metaphor for the Doctor nearly "crossing [the] line" and "[breaking] his own moral code". He likened the Doctor's debate to that of the Fourth Doctor (Tom Baker) in Genesis of the Daleks (1975) and the Fifth Doctor (Peter Davison) in Resurrection of the Daleks (1984). In addition, reviewers noted that the episode presented its characters with "shades of grey", rather than black-and-white villains typically seen in the show.

== Broadcast and reception ==
The official poster released by the BBC for this episode, as featured on the Doctor Who website.

"A Town Called Mercy" was first broadcast in the United Kingdom on BBC One and BBC One HD on 15 September 2012 and on the same date on BBC America in the United States. Overnight ratings showed that it was watched by 6.6 million viewers live, the highest overnight figure of the seventh series thus far. It was the third most-watched programme of the day, and was also the most popular programme the next day on BBC iPlayer. It later came in third on the iPlayer chart for September with 1.4 million requests, behind the first two episodes of the series. When final consolidated viewers were taken into account the figure rose to 8.42 million, also beating "Asylum of the Daleks" to be the highest rated of the series. It also received an Appreciation Index of 85, considered "excellent".

=== Critical reception ===
"A Town Called Mercy" received generally positive reviews from critics. IGN's Matt Risley rated the episode 8.5 out of 10, calling it "a weighty, progressive, sumptuous and entertaining adventure". He praised Whithouse and Metzstein for setting the right mood and found the highlight to be the Doctor's moral uncertainty. Dan Martin of The Guardian described it as "a complex morality dilemma fizzing with sharp dialogue". He wrote that it was Karen Gillan who "emerged as the real star of the episode", citing Amy's conversation with the Doctor about how travelling alone had affected him. The A.V. Club reviewer Keith Phipps gave the episode a B+, enjoying that it spent most of the time discussing the morality issue.

The Telegraph's Fuller awarded "A Town Called Mercy" four out of five stars, calling it "an absorbing, thoughtful, adult piece of drama". He praised Smith's toned-down performance and his conversations with Jex. Though he also praised the "well-crafted" scene between the Doctor and Amy, he felt that the episode was "a waste of Gillan and [Arthur] Darvill's talents" as the two did not feature much. Digital Spy's Morgan Jeffery also gave it four stars, commending the Western atmosphere and the way the Doctor's darkness was handled. He also found Browder to bring an American authenticity to his role that a British actor would not have accomplished. However, like Fuller, he called Amy and Rory's sidelined role "one of the few downsides".

Slant Magazine reviewer Steven Cooper described it as "a very enjoyable episode", though he noted that "the conclusion of the story is a slight let-down after the excellence of what has preceded it" because the issues between the Doctor and Jex were left unresolved. Neela Debnath, writing for The Independent, praised the "brilliant twist" in having Kahler-Jex be the villain rather than the Gunslinger. She found the Doctor holding Jex at gunpoint as "completely uncharacteristic", but interpreted it as foreshadowing Amy and Rory's departure. Likewise, Charlie Jane Anders from io9 felt that the Doctor's decision to let Jex die was "out of character". She criticised the Gunslinger for neither simply using its presumably advanced targeting systems to kill Jex or making the townspeople leave so that he would not have human shields. Additionally, according to her, the episode in general "felt [...] like a Deep Space Nine episode transplanted to the Wild West".

SFX reviewer Ian Berriman gave "A Town Called Mercy" three and a half out of five stars. He commented that the ethical debate made it "a surprisingly mature story", but otherwise the Western tropes made it "occasionally feel a little over-familiar". He also felt it was missing "another twist or two", as most of the episode was dedicated to figuring out what to do with Jex rather than discovering more about him. Berriman also had two "nitpicks" that arose with the plot; the Gunslinger could just walk into the town and take Jex away, or the Doctor could take Jex away in the TARDIS. Dave Golder of the magazine labelled "A Town Called Mercy" as a "disappointing" science fiction Western episode, writing, "There are some great things about this episode ... But in a show that usually has a lot of fun reinventing TV tropes, too much of "A Town Called Mercy" feels a bit been-there, done that." Patrick Mulkern of Radio Times was more critical, writing that he did not "believe" or "feel" it. He felt that Westerns and Doctor Who were two things that "never quite gelled" and also criticised the "languorous pace" and the fact that Rory had little to do. However, he did praise the "gorgeous" set and the "cleverly constructed . . . morality play".
