= Tabernas =

Tabernas, Spain
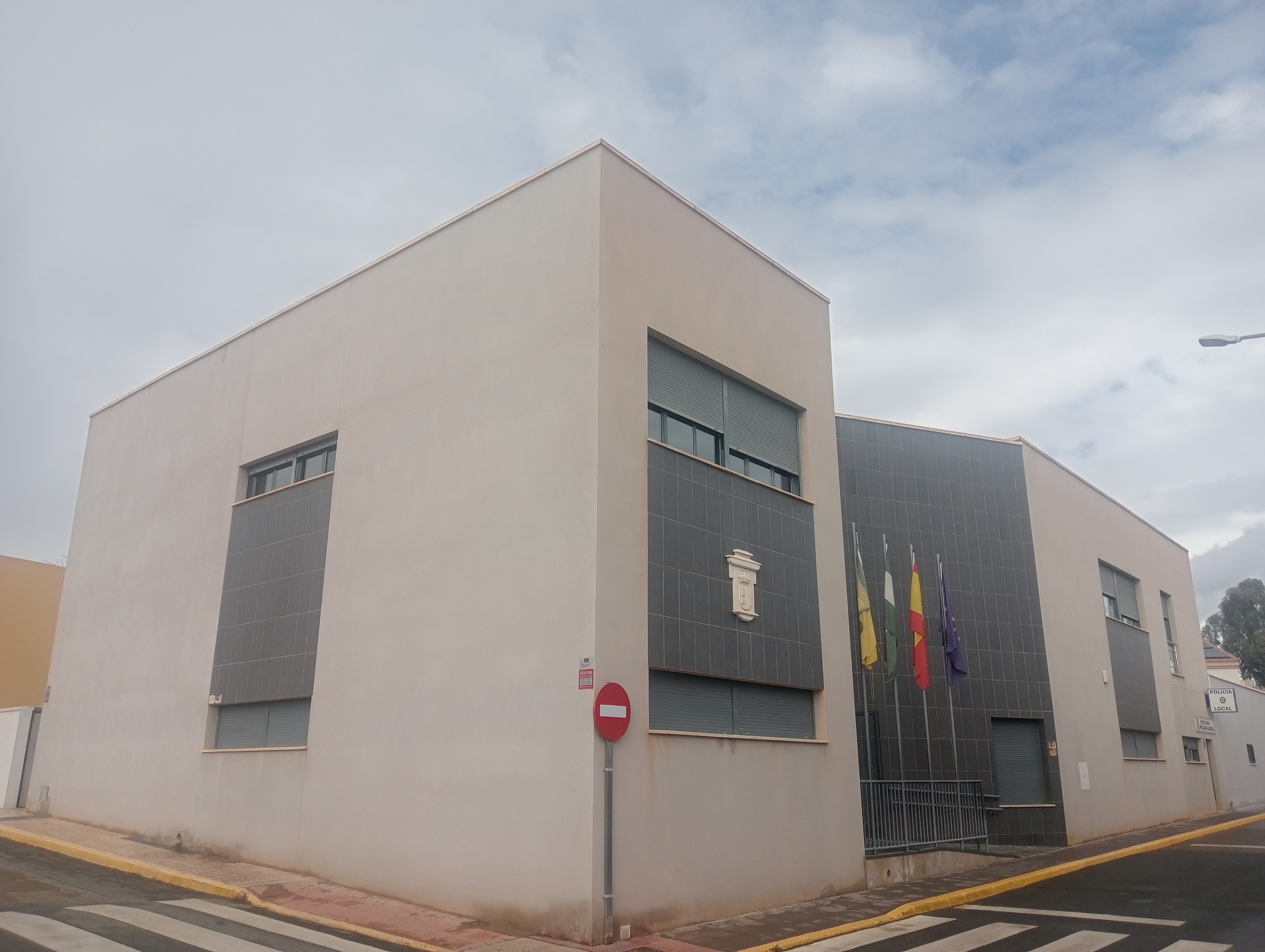
- Town hall

- Flag Coat of arms
- Interactive map of Tabernas, Spain
- Coordinates: 37°03′N 2°23′W
- Country: Spain
- Community: Andalusia
- Municipality: Almería

Government
  - Mayor: Jose Diaz Ibanez (PSOE)

Area
  - Total: 281 km^{2} (108 sq mi)
- Elevation: 400 m (1,300 ft)

Population (2025-01-01)
  - Total: 3,991
  - Density: 14.2/km^{2} (36.8/sq mi)
- Time zone: UTC+1 (CET)
  - Summer (DST): UTC+2 (CEST)
- Climate: BWk

Tabernas is a municipality of Almería province, in the autonomous community of Andalusia, Spain, as well as the name of the principal town of the municipality. It is located on the edge of the famous Tabernas Desert, the filming location of many feature films and TV series. The three film sets in the area: Fort Bravo, Western Leone, Mini Hollywood attract a modest number of tourists. It is the site of Moorish castle ruins, an old church, and a refurbished Teatro Municipal.

== Demographics ==
Historical population
Year	Pop.	±%
1996	3,457	—
2001	3,204	−7.3%
2006	3,494	+9.1%
2017	3,679	+5.3%
Source: INE (Spain)

== Cinema ==
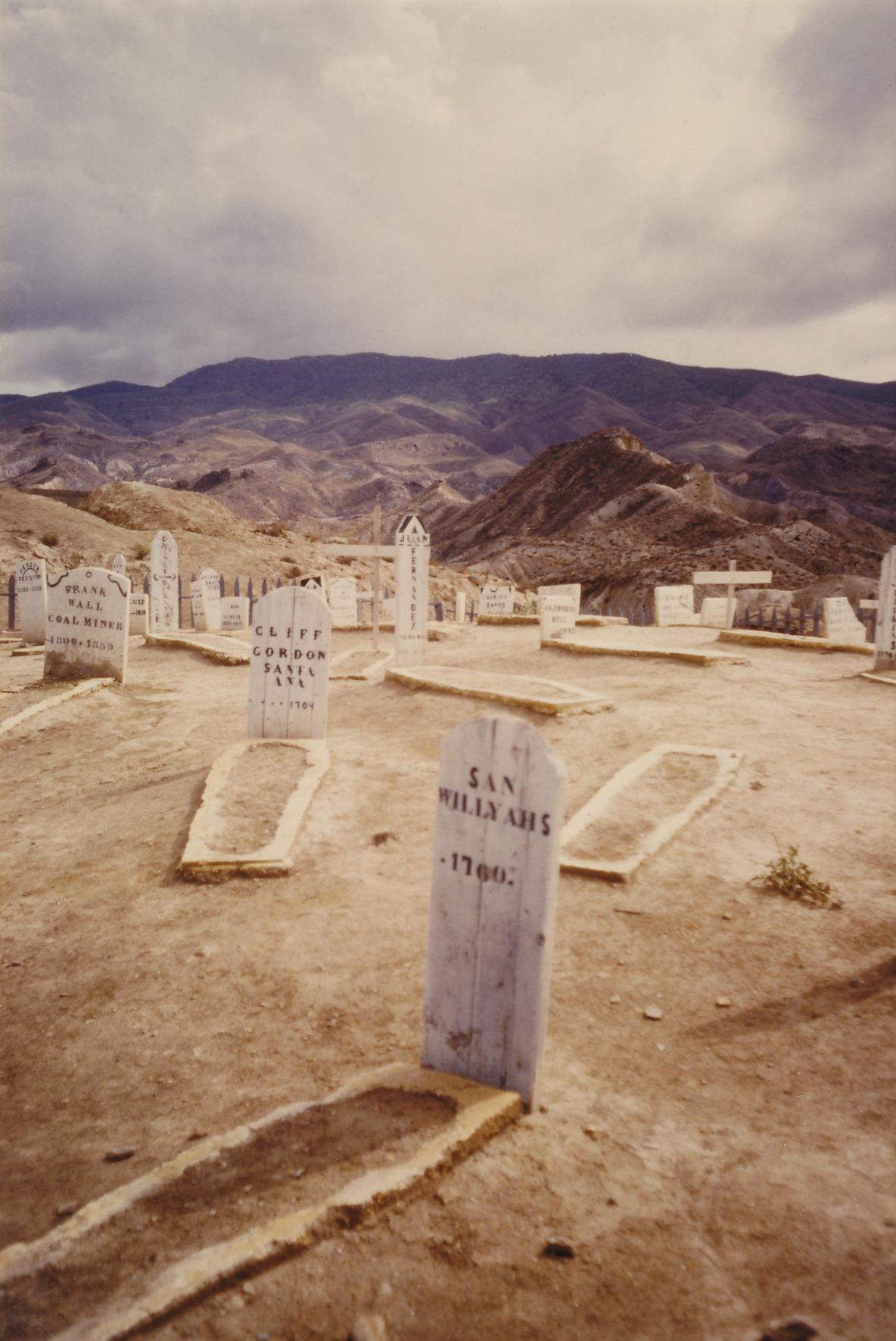
"Wild West" cemetery in "Yucca City" in the desert of Tabernas

The Tabernas Desert, because of its similarities to North American deserts as seen in western movies, to northern Africa and to the Arabian deserts, and because of its lunar landscape, served from the 1950s onwards for the shooting of many films needing such landscapes (e.g. the Spaghetti Westerns), making the area world-renowned.

== Notable people ==
- Encarnación Magaña - In 1942 she was the last woman from Almería to be executed after the Spanish Civil War. In 2020 a street was named after her, making it the first street in Tabernas to be named after a woman.

== See also ==
- List of municipalities in Almería
