= Dinosaurs on a Spaceship =

227 – "Dinosaurs on a Spaceship"
- Doctor Who episode
- Promotional poster

Cast
- Doctor: Matt Smith – Eleventh Doctor
- Companions: Karen Gillan – Amy Pond; Arthur Darvill – Rory Williams
- Others: Riann Steele – Queen Nefertiti; Sunetra Sarker – Indira; Rupert Graves – Riddell; Mark Williams – Brian Williams; David Bradley – Solomon; Noel Byrne – Robot 1; David Mitchell – Robot 1 (voice); Richard Garaghty – Robot 2; Robert Webb – Robot 2 (voice); Richard Hope – Bleytal

Production
- Directed by: Saul Metzstein
- Written by: Chris Chibnall
- Produced by: Marcus Wilson
- Executive producers: Steven Moffat; Caroline Skinner
- Music by: Murray Gold
- Series: Series 7
- Running time: 45 minutes
- First broadcast: 8 September 2012

Chronology
← Preceded by "Asylum of the Daleks"	Followed by → "A Town Called Mercy"

"Dinosaurs on a Spaceship" is the second episode of the seventh series of the British science fiction television programme Doctor Who. It first aired on BBC One in the UK on 8 September 2012 and on BBC America on the same date in the United States. It was written by Chris Chibnall and directed by Saul Metzstein.

The episode features alien time traveller the Doctor (Matt Smith) and his companions Amy Pond (Karen Gillan) and Rory Williams (Arthur Darvill) accompanied by Rory's father, Brian (Mark Williams), Queen Nefertiti (Riann Steele), and John Riddell, a British big-game hunter (Rupert Graves). The group lands on a large spaceship that contains dinosaurs and discover that it is a Silurian ark, though the Silurians have been killed by Solomon (David Bradley), a black market trader who is intent on finding something of value.

"Dinosaurs on a Spaceship" was conceived to be a fun episode, based on a suggestion from the special effects teams about incorporating dinosaurs into Doctor Who. The storyline and characters were developed between Chibnall and head writer and executive producer Steven Moffat. Due to budget limitations, a wider plot had to be developed because the dinosaurs could not be the centrepiece. The dinosaurs were a mix of props and computer-generated imagery. Along with the third episode, "A Town Called Mercy", "Dinosaurs on a Spaceship" was in the first production block of the seventh series, with production commencing in early 2012 in the studio and on Southerndown beach in the Vale of Glamorgan. The episode was watched by 7.57 million viewers in the UK and received generally positive reviews from critics.

== Plot ==
The Eleventh Doctor receives a call from the Indian Space Agency in 2367 about a vast spaceship which will crash into Earth in six hours. The ISA plans to destroy it with missiles unless the Doctor stops it first. He takes Queen Nefertiti of Egypt, Edwardian game hunter John Riddell, companions Amy and Rory, and, inadvertently, Rory's father Brian. Amy discovers the ship is a Silurian ark designed to carry the reptilian humanoids to a new planet along with flora and fauna from their time period to escape a destructive impact. The ship, however, registers no Silurian life forms left on board. After escaping from a group of pterosaurs in the engine room, the Doctor, Rory and Brian are escorted by two robots to a brutal man called Solomon who has been injured in a raptor attack and requires medical help. Solomon reveals himself to be a lawless exotic black market trader who has raided the spaceship in order to steal the dinosaurs. Having had the robots kill all of the Silurians, Solomon was unable to take control of the ship himself and the computer defaulted to its point of origin, causing it to return to Earth. Discovering Queen Nefertiti's identity and value, he decides to kidnap her and leave in his own ship. Though the Doctor refuses, Nefertiti agrees to go with him to save the others. Meanwhile, the ISA proceeds to fire their missiles at the ark, against the Doctor's wishes.

While Amy and Riddell shoot hostile dinosaurs with "anaesthetic" guns, the Doctor disables Solomon's robots and rescues Nefertiti, then tricks the ISA missiles into targeting Solomon's ship rather than the ark: it is destroyed, taking him with it. Rory and Brian pilot the ark away from the Earth, as the ship can only be piloted by two people of the same gene chain. The Doctor then takes Amy, Rory and Brian back home where Brian, having overcome his fear of travelling, starts a world tour (with one of his postcards showing the dinosaurs on their new home of Siluria). Nefertiti, who has been flirting and clashing with Riddell, opts to go with him rather than return to her own time.

== Production ==
=== Writing and casting ===
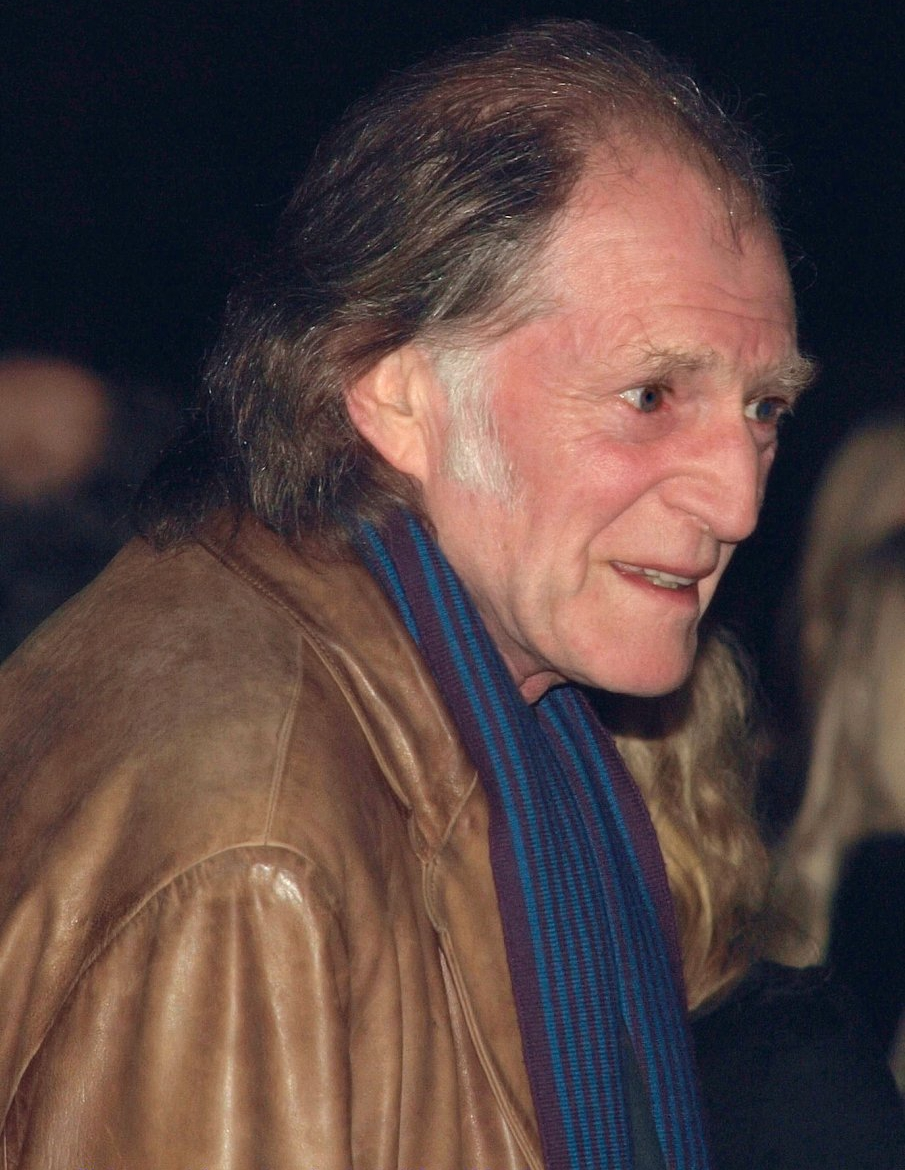
David Bradley was cast as Solomon, the episode's main villain.

Showrunner Steven Moffat said that putting dinosaurs on a spaceship was "the secret of success". The idea to use dinosaurs in Doctor Who came from the special effects teams The Mill and Millennium FX. As "Asylum of the Daleks" was a darker opening episode, "Dinosaurs on a Spaceship" is more about fun. In Moffat's pitch to writer Chris Chibnall, he proposed, "Maybe it's a ship heading towards Earth, and Earth is on alert". Chibnall had previously written the Doctor Who episodes "42" (2007), "The Hungry Earth"/"Cold Blood" (2010), as well as work for the spinoff series Torchwood. The Doctor had previously encountered dinosaurs in the 1974 serial Invasion of the Dinosaurs. Moffat suggested the spaceship was Silurian, and Chibnall, who had written the return of the Silurians in "The Hungry Earth"/"Cold Blood", felt that it was "a nice reveal and shows you more about them, even in a story that isn't really about them".

Chibnall suggested including a "bonkers" gang of characters picked from around time and space. He felt that Doctor Who could have "collisions of characters that no other show in the world can do", and that it was about finding a "disparate" group of characters who would "bounce" off each other. Nefertiti's decision not to return to her own time fits in with the historical record, as the date and cause of her death are unknown. Chibnall asked to introduce Rory's father, as Amy and Rory would be leaving in four episodes and Rory's family life had not been explored yet. Mark Williams, who played Rory's father, previously appeared in the Fifth Doctor audio adventure The Eternal Summer. Rupert Graves, who played an Edwardian hunter in this episode, previously worked with Moffat on the BBC series Sherlock. David Bradley's character, Solomon, was modelled on a "well-known nightclub owner with long hair". Chibnall described him as "half businessman, half Somali pirate". Bradley and Williams had previously worked together on the Harry Potter film franchise. Bradley was later cast as First Doctor actor William Hartnell for the Doctor Who 50th anniversary drama An Adventure in Space and Time, and then played the character of the First Doctor in the Christmas special episode Twice Upon a Time. Comedy duo Mitchell and Webb provided the voices of Solomon's two robots; executive producer Caroline Skinner called the casting choice "perfect". Richard Hope, who played the Silurian Bleytal, previously appeared as Malohkeh in the episodes "The Hungry Earth", "Cold Blood" and "The Wedding of River Song".

=== Filming and effects ===
"Dinosaurs on a Spaceship" and the following episode, "A Town Called Mercy", were the first episodes to be produced for the seventh series, both directed by Saul Metzstein. The two episodes are Metzstein's first Doctor Who credits. The episode contains one of the biggest sets ever built for the show. The scenes in the "engine room" were filmed at Southerndown beach, Vale of Glamorgan in late February 2012. The beach had previously been used as "Bad Wolf Bay" in "Doomsday" (2006) and "Journey's End" (2008), and as the planet Alfava Metraxis in "The Time of Angels"/"Flesh and Stone" (2010).

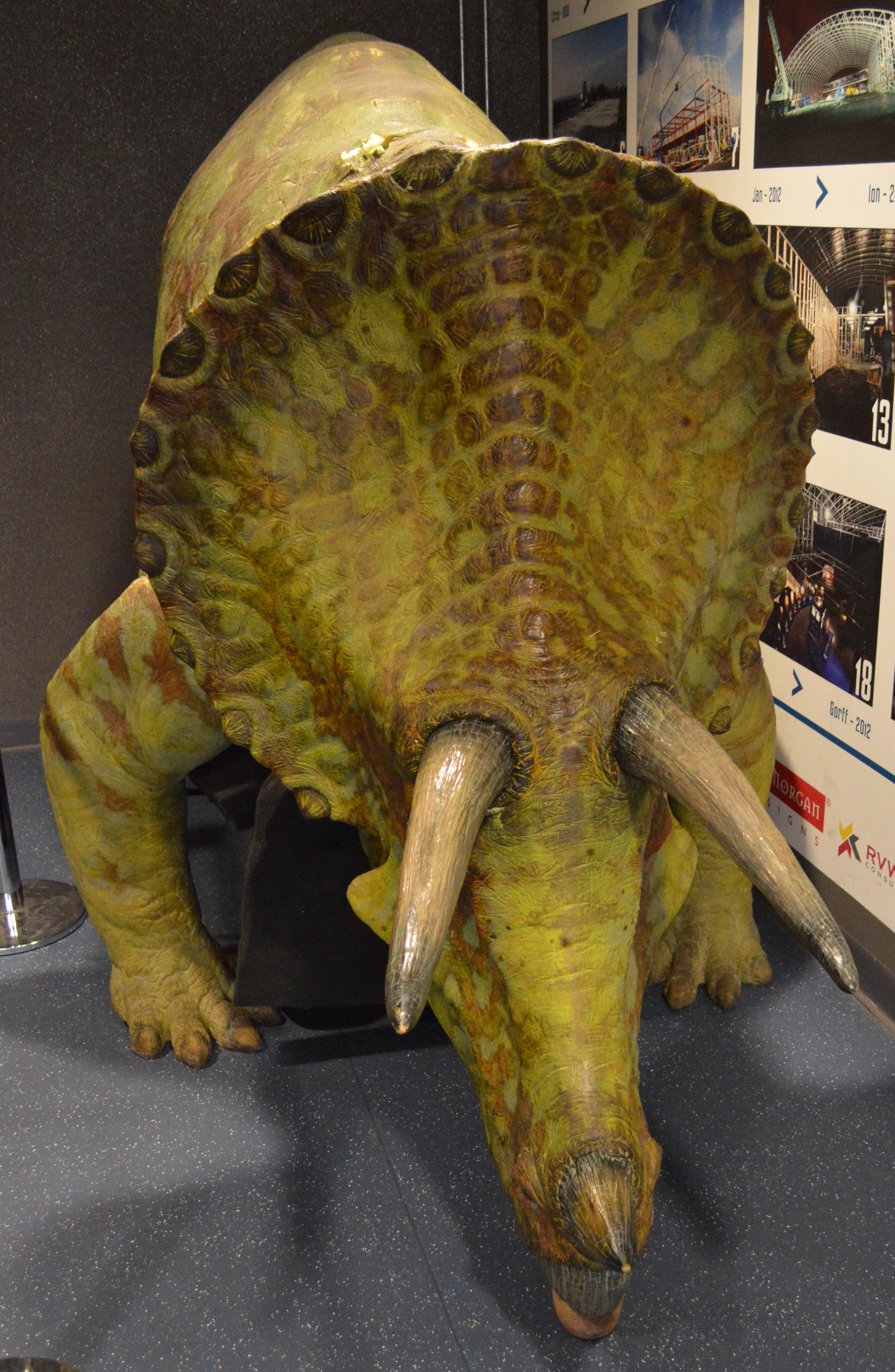
The Triceratops prop, on display at the Doctor Who Experience.

The production team had to be mindful of the series' budget when planning the effects and sets; Chibnall commented that "it would be very easy to spend £300m on this but we don't have it". As such, the dinosaurs could not dominate the episode, and Chibnall had to tell "a big other story". The scene where Amy, Riddell, and Nefertiti stumble upon a sleeping Tyrannosaurus rex was almost cut as it was originally intended to feature computer-generated (CGI) raptors, which were too expensive. However, Millennium FX realised they could use a baby T-Rex that had been in an exhibit they designed. The episode contains a variety of "favourite" dinosaurs; some were built from scratch, while others were CGI. Smith had to wear padded trousers when riding the triceratops, and recalled it was "a painful couple of hours, a laugh though and definitely worth it". Half of the triceratops was actually built and pushed by crewmen when Smith, Darvill, and Williams were riding it. The rest of it was filled in with CGI by The Mill. The Doctor Who logo in the title sequence featured the texture of a dinosaur's hide, in keeping with the varied "blockbuster" themes for each of the opening five episodes of the series. A preview clip of the episode was released at the 2012 San Diego Comic-Con. Solomon's robots were modified versions of the Roboidz suits that Millennium FX had previously made for Mission: 2110.

== Broadcast and reception ==
"Dinosaurs on a Spaceship" was first broadcast in the United Kingdom on BBC One on 8 September 2012, and on the same date on BBC America in the United States. Overnight ratings showed that it had been watched by 5.5 million viewers live in the UK. Final consolidated ratings rose to 7.57 million viewers. The episode also received 1.8 million requests during the month of September on BBC's online iPlayer, placing it second on the chart behind "Asylum of the Daleks". It also received an Appreciation Index of 87, considered "excellent". In Canada, on Space, the episode was watched by an average calculation of 575,000 viewers, making it the most watched item on the channel that week.

=== Critical reception ===
"Dinosaurs on a Spaceship" received generally positive reviews from critics, with a few detractors. Dan Martin of The Guardian described it as "fun", with praise to the expensive-looking sets and dinosaurs, the usefulness of Amy and Rory, and the concept of the gang. While he admitted it was "flimsy" and "pretty much a story built around a title", he thought it was "the finest episode two from Doctor Who in some time". However, he was unsettled by the underscore of darkness that was "almost disturbing enough to ruin everything". Similarly, Charlie Anders of io9 called it "the most fun I can remember Doctor Who being in years", while also noting gradual distancing between the Doctor and the Ponds and identifying a recurrent theme in this season: the Doctor "not being recognized". Radio Times reviewer Patrick Mulkern was pleased that the "flawlessly realised" CGI dinosaurs redeemed the ones seen in Invasion of the Dinosaurs. He also praised Bradley's Solomon and the "fresh slant" of having the ark built by Silurians, rather than humans as previously seen in the programme. The A.V. Club's Keith Phipps gave it a B, finding that it was formulaic but executed well. Unlike Martin, he enjoyed the dark turns. Will Barber-Taylor of The Consulting Detective wrote that "[a] mixture between good CGI and a rather nicely paced story means that 'Dinosaurs on a Spaceship' keeps you hooked to the end."

Dave Golder of SFX gave the episode four out of five stars, describing it as "slight and fluffy and silly, with the occasional creaky bit of plotting ... but enormously entertaining". He was pleased that the guest characters were played "straight" rather than for comedy, and found the dinosaur effects "great" and the Silurian twist "enriching continuity". However, he felt that the teaser was too fast-paced, Nefertiti was "rather bland", and wrote that it was unlikely the Doctor would have a friendship with a big game hunter. IGN's Matt Risley rated "Dinosaurs on a Spaceship" 7 out of 10, noting that it "isn't going to win any awards for scriptwriting or pathos, but it certainly succeeded on a family-friendly level full of whimsy". Though he wrote that Brian was "brilliant", he overall criticised the "gang", feeling that they "served little purpose other than to inject some conveniently timed plot devices when needed". He also did not like the "bickering Marvin the Paranoid Android-lite" robots. However, Neela Debnath of The Independent enjoyed the gang, writing, "the more companions there are the more variety it adds to the show because each one has their own flaws and backstory".

Digital Spy's Morgan Jeffery was more mixed, giving it three stars out of five. He described it as "rather over-stuffed", with Riddell and Nefertiti one-dimensional and under-used. He also criticised the robots and felt that the Doctor leaving Solomon to die might have been "a step too far". However, he praised the three leads and Brian, as well as the foreshadowing with Amy and Rory. Gavin Fuller of The Daily Telegraph was even more negative, only rating it two stars out of five. He described it as "ultimately a bit of a mess", calling the contrast between the "uneasy mix of the humorous and downright daft" gang and the "sinister" Solomon story "jarring". Fuller also noted that the dinosaurs were "a sideshow to the main plot". Like Morgan, he also felt that the Doctor's actions at the end would "sit uneasily within the viewers".
