= Tabernas Desert =

Desert in Spain

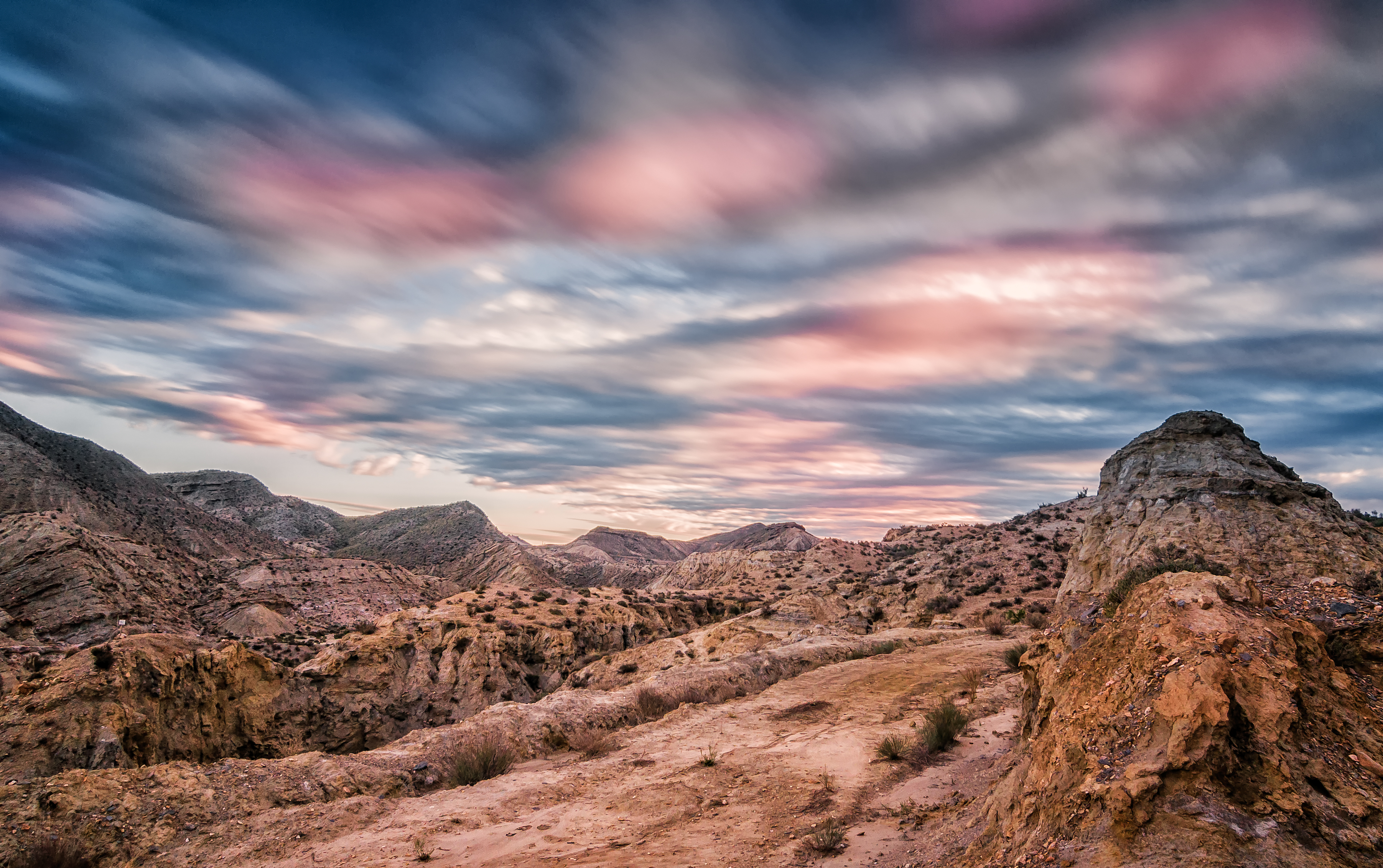
- A view of the desert

- Location within Spain Location within Europe
- Area: 280 km^{2} (110 mi^{2})

Naming
- Native name: Desierto de Tabernas (Spanish)

Geography
- Country: Spain
- Autonomous community: Andalusia
- Province: Almería
- Population center: Tabernas
- Coordinates: 37°N 2.45°W
- Interactive map of Tabernas Desert

The Tabernas Desert (Spanish: Desierto de Tabernas) is a desert located within Spain's south-eastern province of Almería. It is in the interior, about 30 kilometers (19 mi) north of the provincial capital Almería, in the Tabernas municipality in Andalusia. Tabernas is the only desert within Europe, since most of its area has a desert climate.

Due to its high elevation and mountainous location, it has slightly higher annual precipitation (more than 220 mm (8.7 in) per year) than coastal areas of Almeria. It is a nature reserve (protected area) that spans 280 square kilometers (110 square miles).

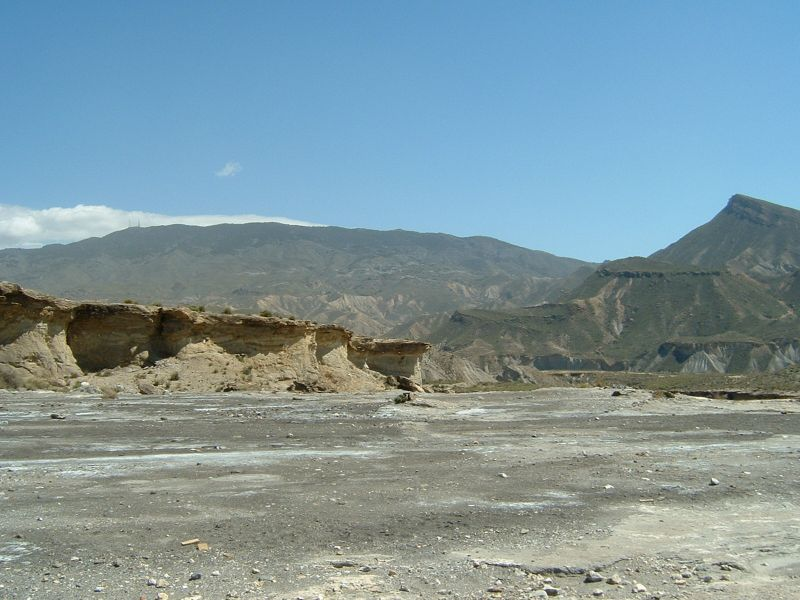
The desert of Tabernas.

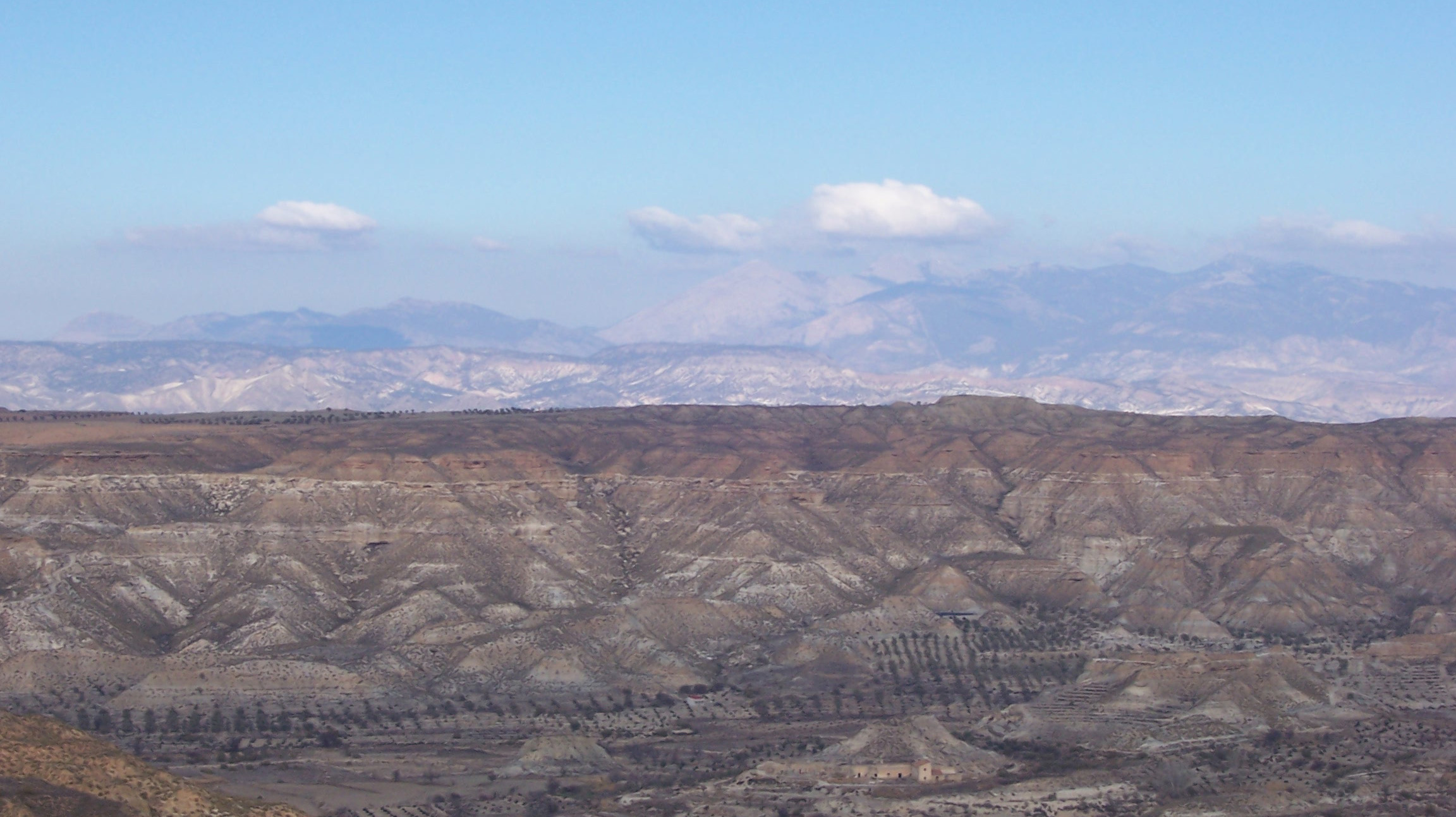
View of the Badlands on the Granada Plateau.

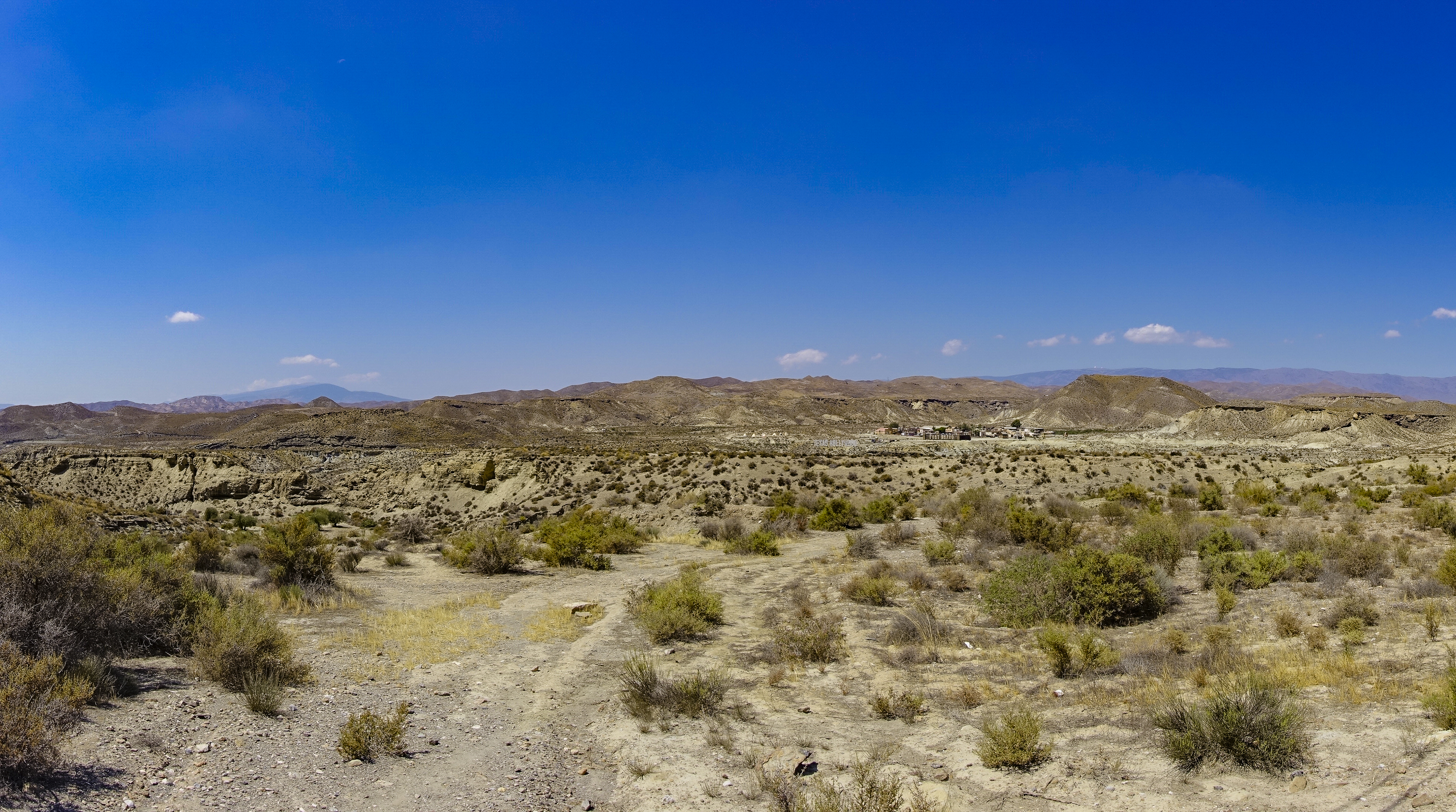
Tabernas Desert landscape

The Tabernas Desert is located between the Sierra de los Filabres to the north, the Sierra Alhamilla to the south-southeast and the Sierra Nevada to the west.

== Climate ==
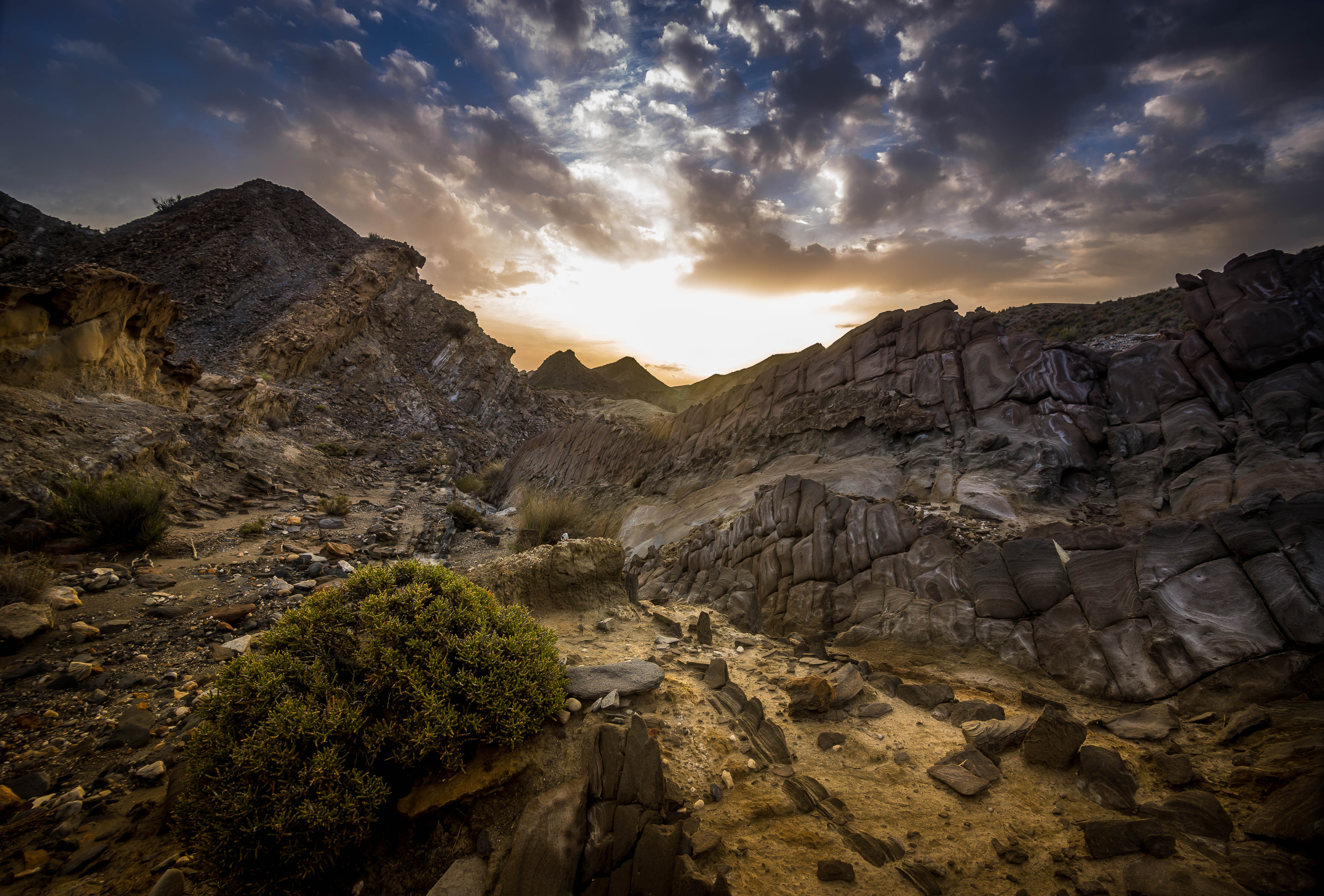
A sunrise in the Tabernas Desert

The Tabernas Desert is defined mainly by a hot desert climate, a hot semi-desert climate, a cold desert climate, and a cold semi-desert climate. It is isolated from the humid winds of the Mediterranean Sea in an area with little precipitation known as Levante.

In the lowest elevations of the Tabernas basin (about 400 m (1,310 ft) above sea level), the average annual temperature is close to 18.0 °C (64.4 °F). Due to its relative proximity to the coast and its relatively high altitude, temperatures in winter vary between 0–12 °C (32–54 °F) in the higher altitudes to 6–15 °C (43–59 °F) in the lower altitudes while temperatures in the summer vary from 16–29 °C (61–84 °F) in the higher altitudes to 20–31 °C (68–88 °F) in the lower altitudes. The annual average precipitation is 15–22 cm (5.9–8.7 in) (depending on the zone) with only one-third falling in the hot season (May to October). The average annual sunshine varies from 2800 to 3000 hours.

Thus the climate, from 400–800 meters (1,310–2,620 ft), is an arid and semi-arid type. This characteristic is also aggravated by the foehn effect.

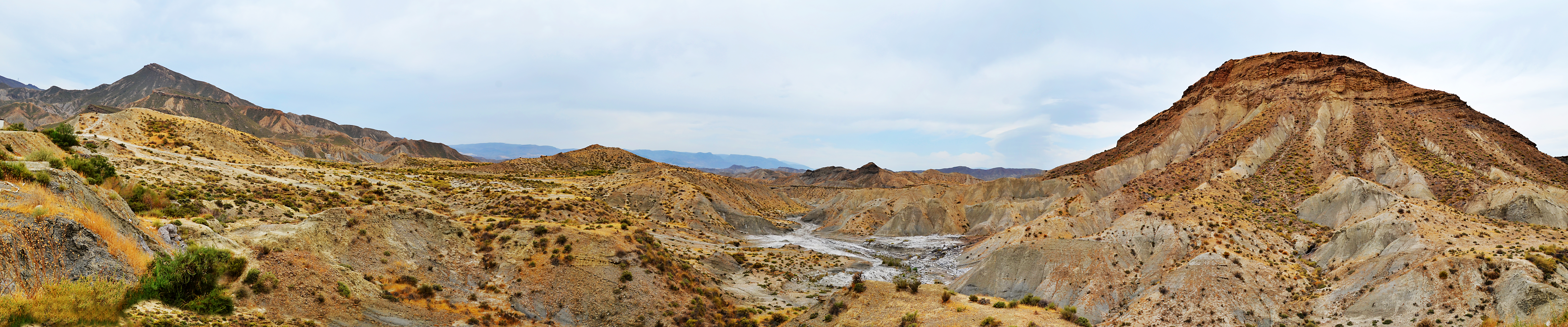
Panoramic view of Tabernas Desert from A-92 (GPS 37.016773 -2.446092)

== Solar energy ==
A solar platform (the largest concentrating solar technology research, development and test center in Europe: the solar platform of Almería ) has been installed to conduct experiments on solar thermal energy. High-tech research is carried out in the same place.

== Geology and biology ==
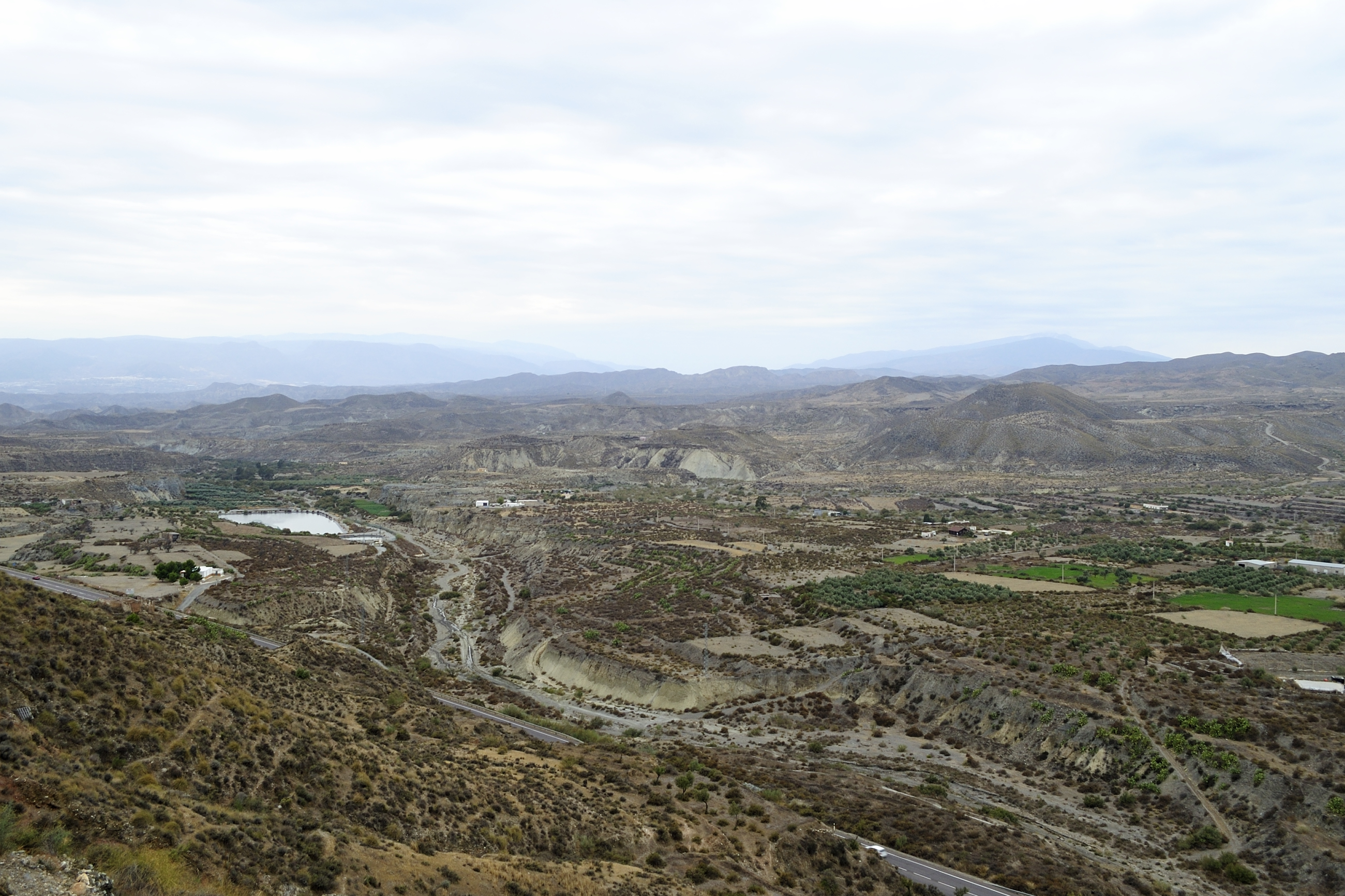
Panorama

Millions of years ago, the corridor between the Sierra Alhamilla and the Sierra de Filabres was covered by the Mediterranean Sea. Over time, the level of the Mediterranean Sea decreased and eventually became a sedimentary basin.

The little rainfall that occurs is usually torrential, so that the ground, consisting of marl and sandstone with little vegetation, is unable to retain moisture. Instead, the rain causes erosion, forming the characteristic landscape of badlands.

Arroyos formed by torrential rain harbor the scarce vegetation.

=== Flora and fauna ===
The desert is well-endowed with vegetation for a desert. Plants such as the sea lavender (Limonium insignis), which are teetering on the verge of extinction, manage to flourish in the arid environment of the desert. In winter, the landscape of the desert turns white when the toadflax linaria (Nigricans lange) flowers. There are specimens of yellow scorpions (Buthus occitanus), tarantulas (Lycosa tarentulla) and black widow spiders (Latrodectus tredecimguttatus). Coastal areas have lesser weevers such as Echiichthys vipera and Tachinus dracco, which usually live under the sand.

==== Reptiles and amphibians ====
The reptilian population of the desert includes ladder snakes, spiny-footed lizards and ocellated lizards. Marsh frogs, natterjack toads and terrapins inhabit the moist areas of the desert.

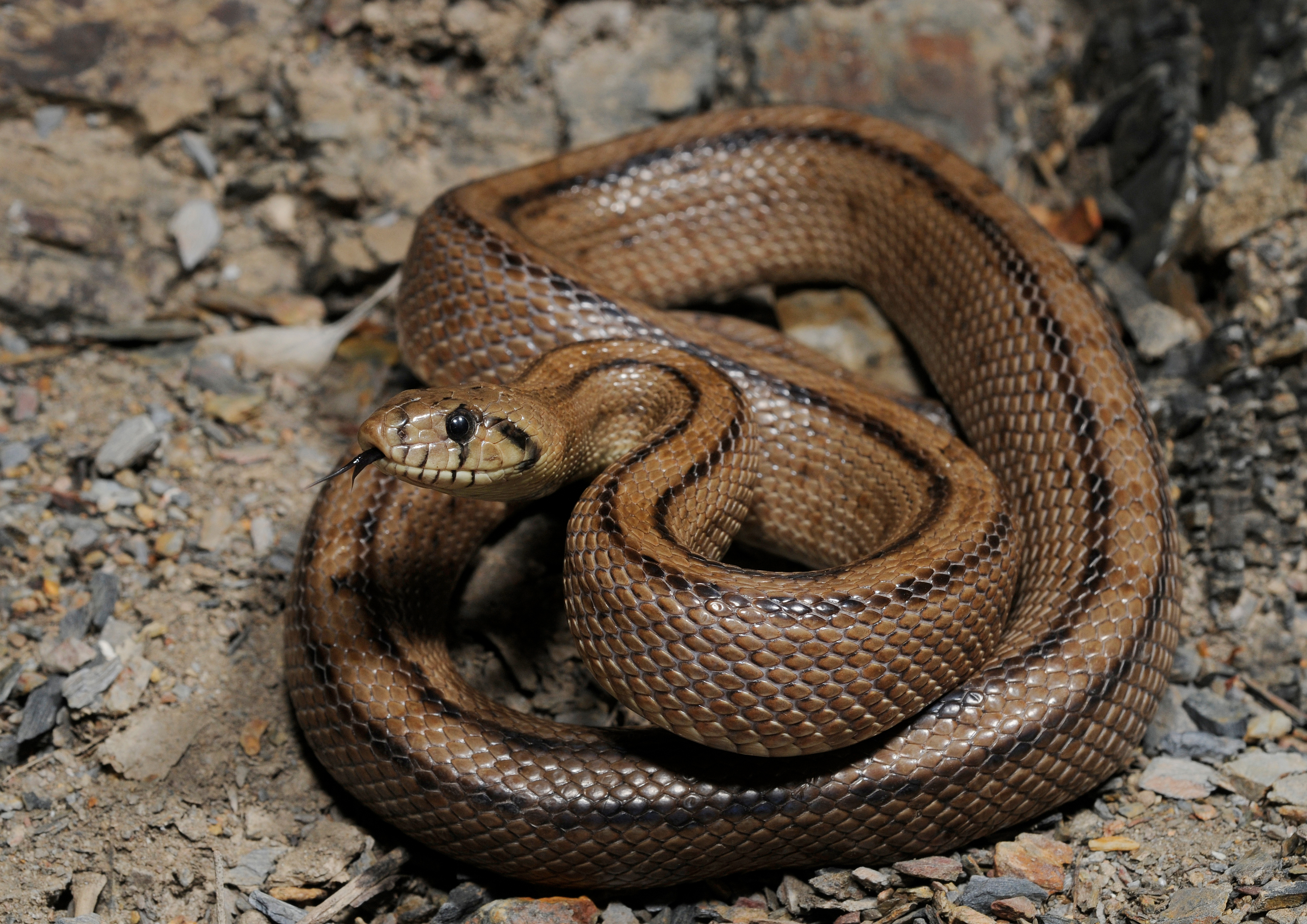
A ladder snake

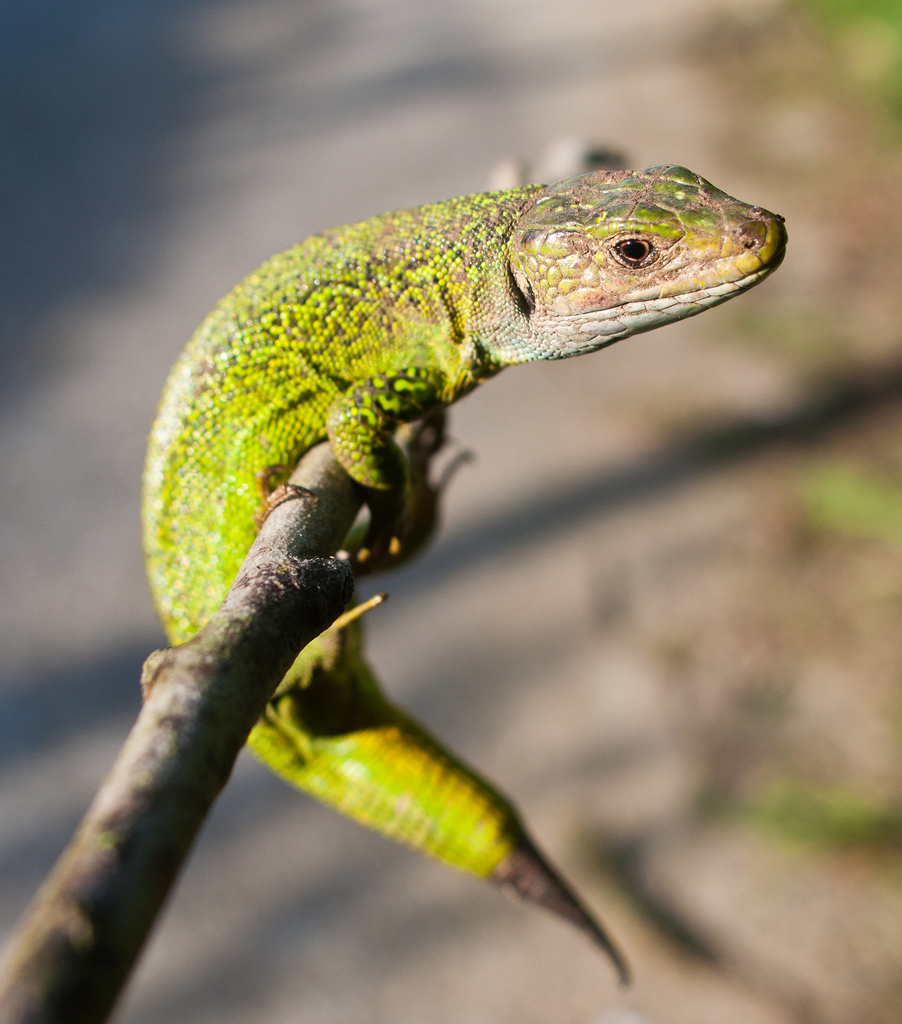
Ocellated lizard

==== Birds ====
Birds of prey such as the Bonelli's eagles and peregrine falcons roam the desert's skies. Lesser hunters include kestrels and eagle owls. Species such as the blue rock thrush, rock sparrow, rock bunting inhabit the rocky areas of the desert whereas warblers, goldfinches, golden orioles and serins prefer the ramblas near the dry river beds.

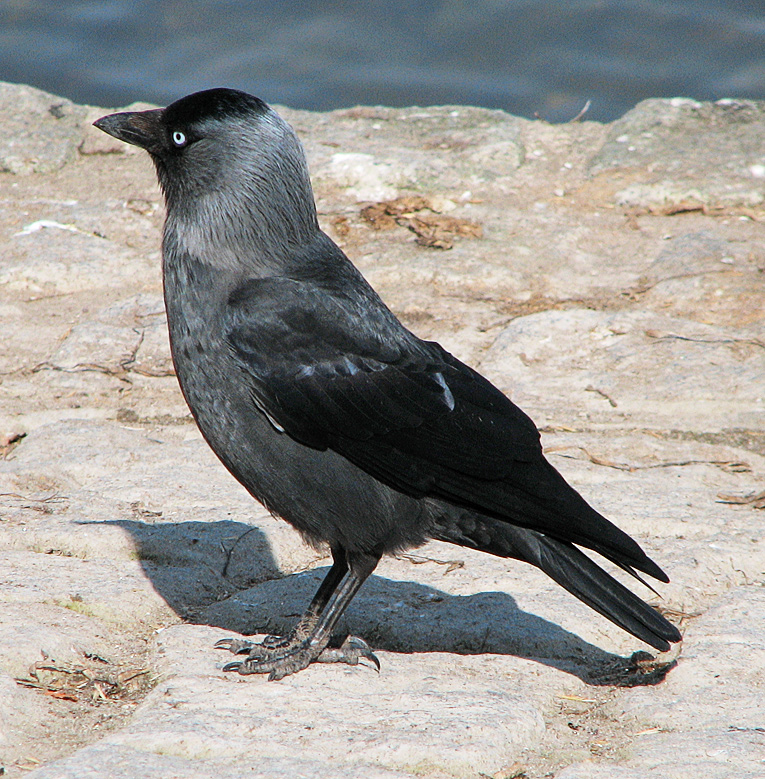
A jackdaw

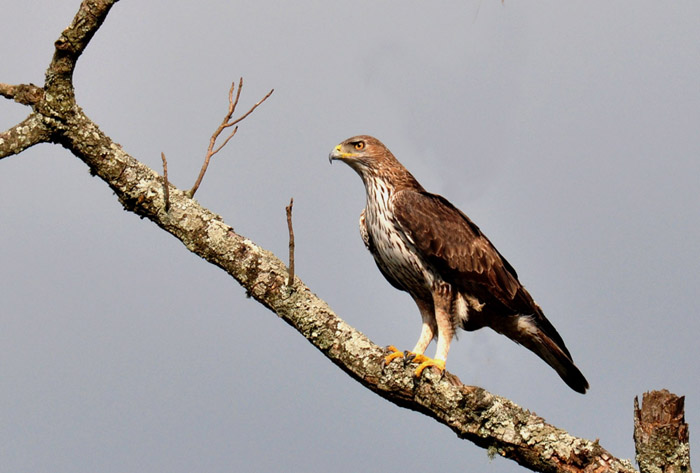
Bonelli's eagle

==== Mammals ====
The desert contains approximately 20 species of mammals. The Algerian hedgehog is one of the most important mammals inhabiting the area, in addition to rabbit, hare and dormouse species.

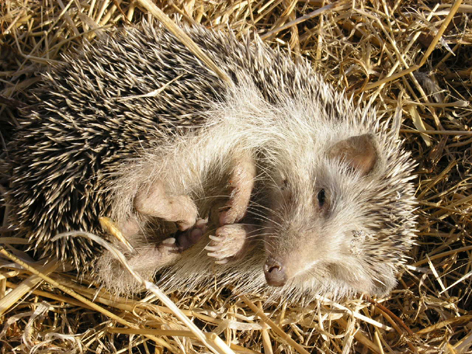
The Algerian, or North African, hedgehog (Atelerix algirus)

== Cinema ==
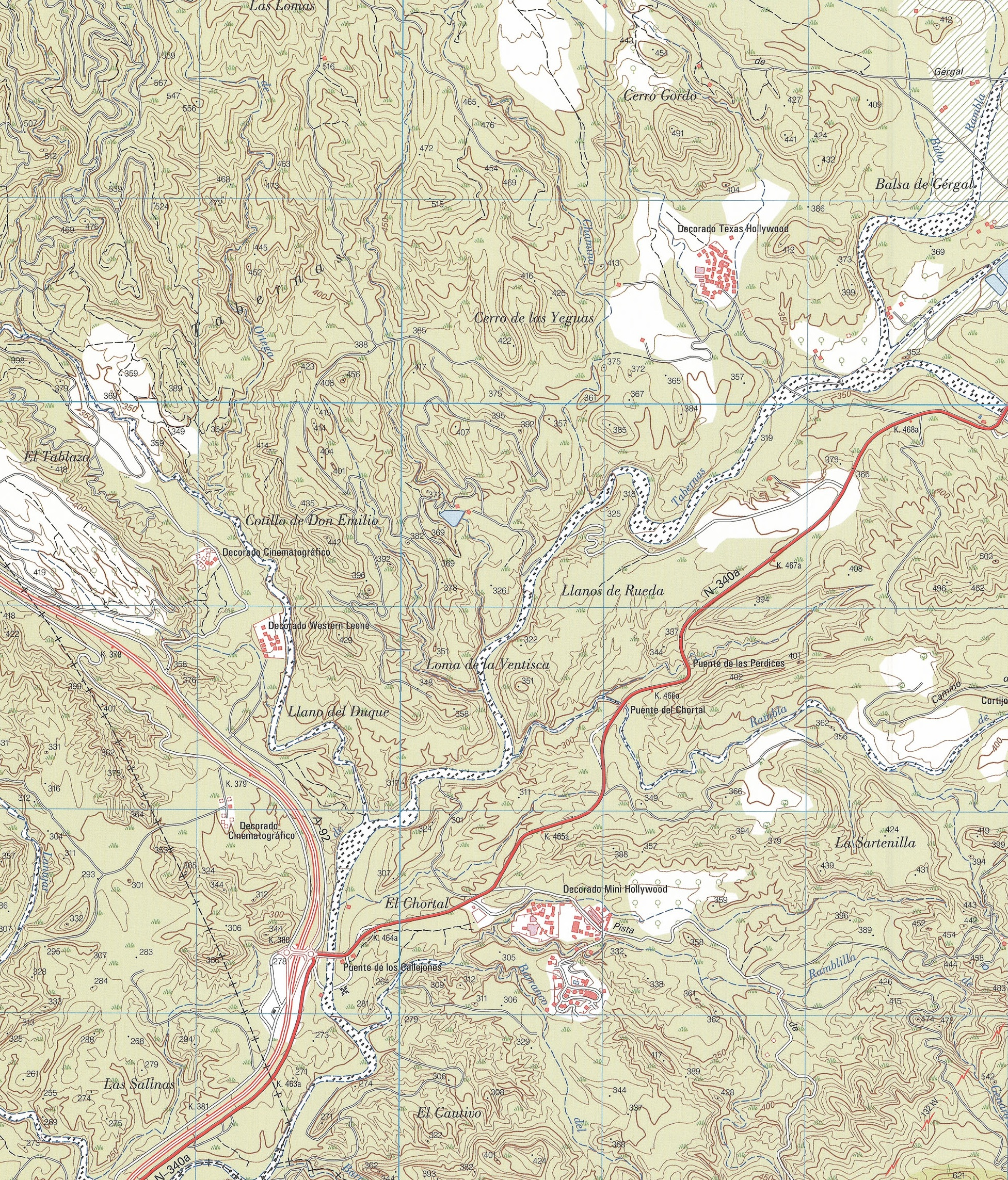
Map showing the different film sets built west of Tabernas

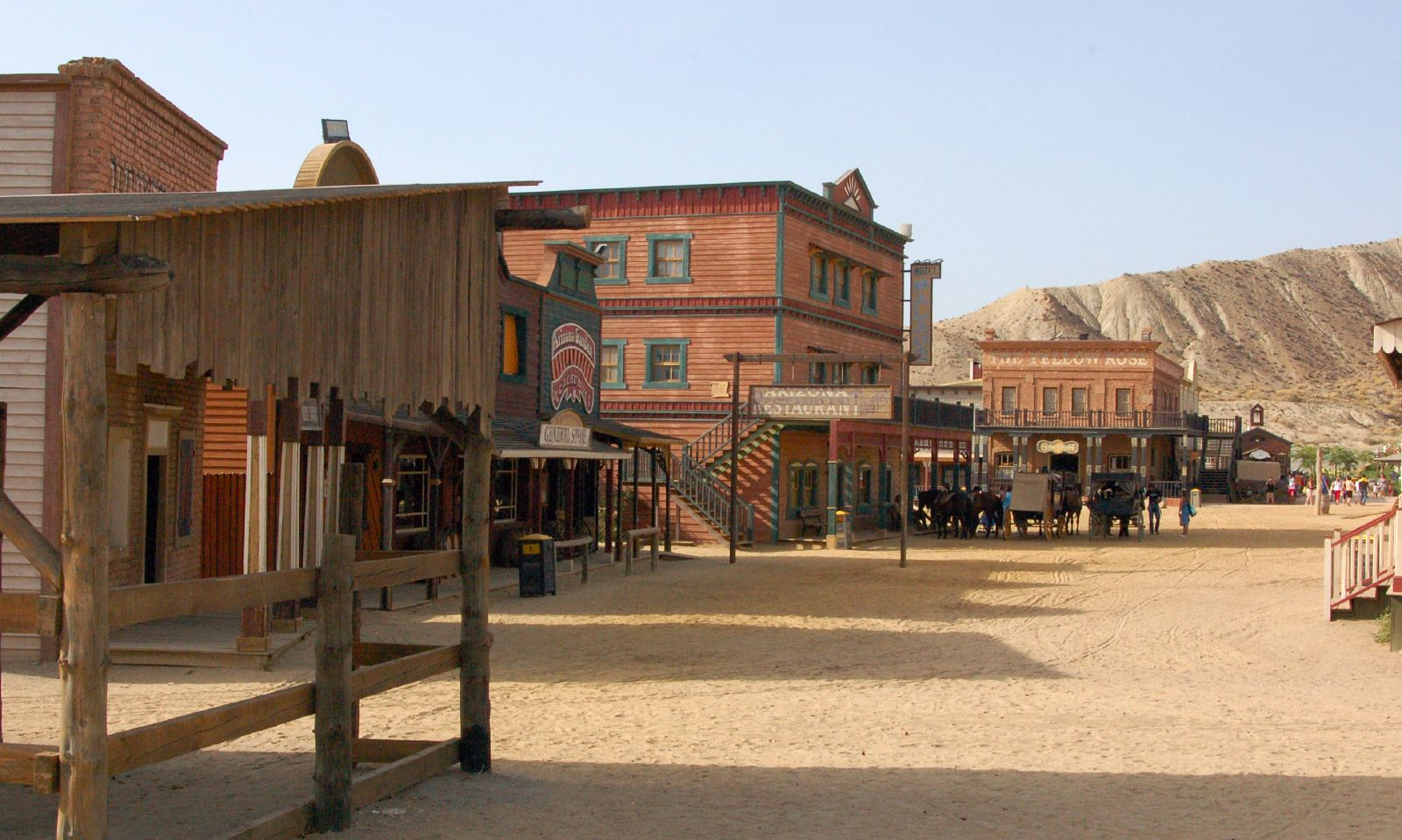
A street of Mini Hollywood Oasys

Because of its similarities to deserts in the southwestern United States, northern Mexico, northern Africa, and Arabia, Tabernas has been a popular area to shoot many films since the 1950s.

The Spaghetti Westerns were shot at the three main studios :

- Fort Bravo Texas Hollywood is one of the three western villages (towns) still in operation (there were up to 14 in the great era of spaghetti westerns).
- Mini Hollywood Oasys (with a zoo) is now only used mainly for tourist purposes with some productions still taking place.
- Western Leone is now used mainly for tourist purposes.

The remaining eleven have been gradually abandoned despite their historical interest and tourist potential:

- Tabernas Desert Film Studios - Various film productions have been made here.
- Cine Escuela de Almería - Film school but also location.
- Mini Hollywood Rio - Entertainment center based on the universe of westerns.
- Almería Film Studio (formerly known as Estudios de Almería) - Used for various filming.
- La Cañada de Baza - Production and filming site.
- El Rancho - Another western setting.
- Desert Film Studios - A place used for various film projects.
- Agua Amarga Film Studio - Nearby studio used for various films.
- El Tarajal - Location for filming in the area.
- Estudio de Cine en el Desierto - A studio that has seen several productions.
- Sesenta - Filming location and film-related events in the desert.

The sixth season of the TV series Game of Thrones was shot in locations from Andalusia to Catalonia, including the desert, which is the Dothraki Sea, a gigantic steppe in Essos, the largest continent.

Nowadays, many video clips and television commercials are shot, although from time to time it is still the setting for a film or television series, taking advantage of the photogenic landscape of the Almeria desert and thanks to the western settlements that are still standing. From the late 1950s to the present day, more than 300 films have been shot in this desert, most of them westerns.

In 2002, comedy western film 800 Bullets was filmed in the Tabernas Desert. An episode of the seventh season of the British science fiction series Doctor Who, entitled A Town Called Mercy, was filmed in the desert, as well as several episodes of the third season of Penny Dreadful in 2015. In 2016, the desert was used as a set for the music video of Shout Out to My Ex by the British girl group Little Mix included in their fourth album. The same year, scenes were also filmed for the sixth season of Game of Thrones, depicting Dothraki territory. In 2017, the exteriors of the Black Museum episode of the fourth season of the Black Mirror series were filmed there.

== See also ==
- Climate of Spain
- List of films shot in Almería
- List of Sites of Community Importance in Andalusia
