= Algo más que morir =

2014 film

- Film poster
- Directed by: Oier Martínez de Santos; José Luis Murga
- Screenplay by: Oier Martínez de Santos; José Luis Murga
- Produced by: Pepe Jordana; Oier Martínez de Santos; José Luis Murga
- Starring: Laida Burguera; Kepa Jiménez; Maite Marcos; José Luis Murga; Javier Salazar
- Music by: Germán Ponte
- Production company: Prosopopeya Producciones S.L.
- Release date: October 11, 2014 (Spain)
- Running time: 74 min
- Country: Spain
- Language: Spanish

Algo más que morir is a 2014 Spanish Western film directed by Oier Martínez de Santos and José Luis Murga. It was released on 11 October 2014 at the 4º Almeria Western Film Festival, where it received the Premio al Público and Especial Almeria Collection. It was shot in Kuartango. It is portrayed by José Luis Murga in the role of Dick Murray.

It was shown on 13 May 2015 at the Facultad de Letras de Vitoria of the Universidad del País Vasco.

== Cast ==
- Laida Burguera as Lizzi Murray, Dick and Lilly's daughter.
- Kepa Jiménez as Carson, a cacique who kills and kidnaps ranchers.
- Maite Marcos as Lilly Murray, Dick's spouse.
- José Luis Murga as Dick Murray, who has been looking for his brother during seven years.
- Javier Salazar as Pat, a dishonest player and drinker.
