= Texas Hollywood =

Theme park in Almería, Spain

Coordinates: 37.048739°N 2.421271°W

Texas Hollywood/Fort Bravo is a Western-styled theme park in the province of Almería in Spain. Built in the early 1970s, it lies a few kilometres to the north of the N-340 road highway (468 km mark), near the town of Tabernas.

== History ==
Around 1977, Rafa Molina, a stuntman, bought the set for US$6,000 to improve his job opportunities if the set was to be used for filming. In the early 1980s, he started charging visitors money to tour the set. Mock shoot-outs and barroom brawls were later added, and one of the buildings was converted into a full saloon to sell beer. It is now known as Fort Bravo.

== Style ==
The building architecture in Texas Hollywood is of two different styles built back to back split between two areas. The Western set features a blacksmith, jail, hotel, gallows and clapboard buildings from the American Old West era. The Spanish set consists of a town square, a church, and houses found in a typical Mexican pueblo. Texas Hollywood remains an active film set.

== Media ==
The television series Queen of Swords was filmed May 3, 2000 to December 12, 2000, principally in the Spanish buildings and the surrounding Tabernas Desert. The Western buildings were also used for the series with the Western jail serving as the Spanish jail and one of the large Western buildings was converted into a sound stage containing the living quarters of both Senorita Alvarado and Col. Montoya.

The Doctor Who episode "A Town Called Mercy" was filmed here and at Oasys/Mini Hollywood in 2012.

Depeche Mode's music video for the song Personal Jesus was filmed there.

== Photos ==
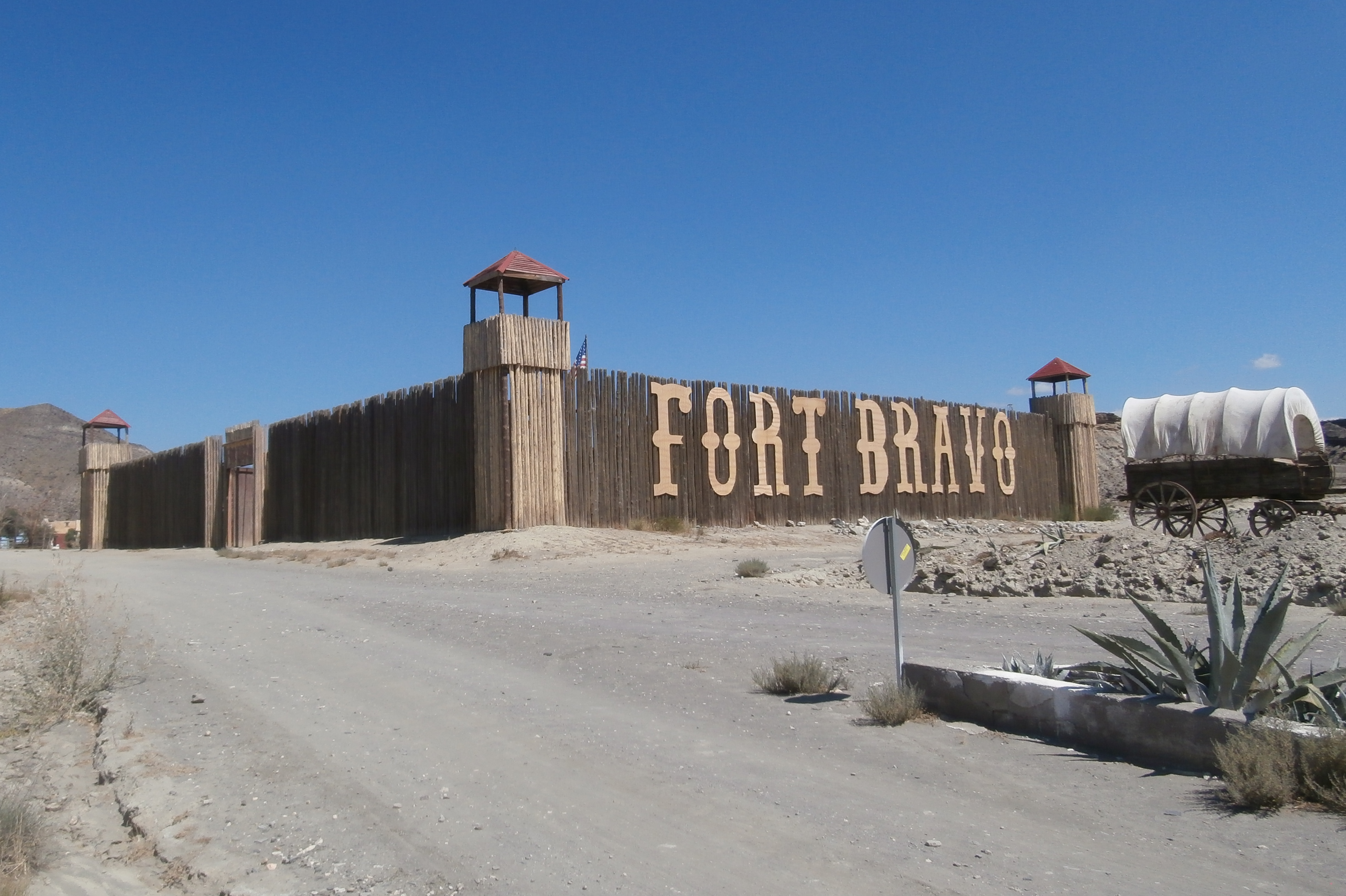
Fort at the entrance to Fort Bravo/Texas Hollywood

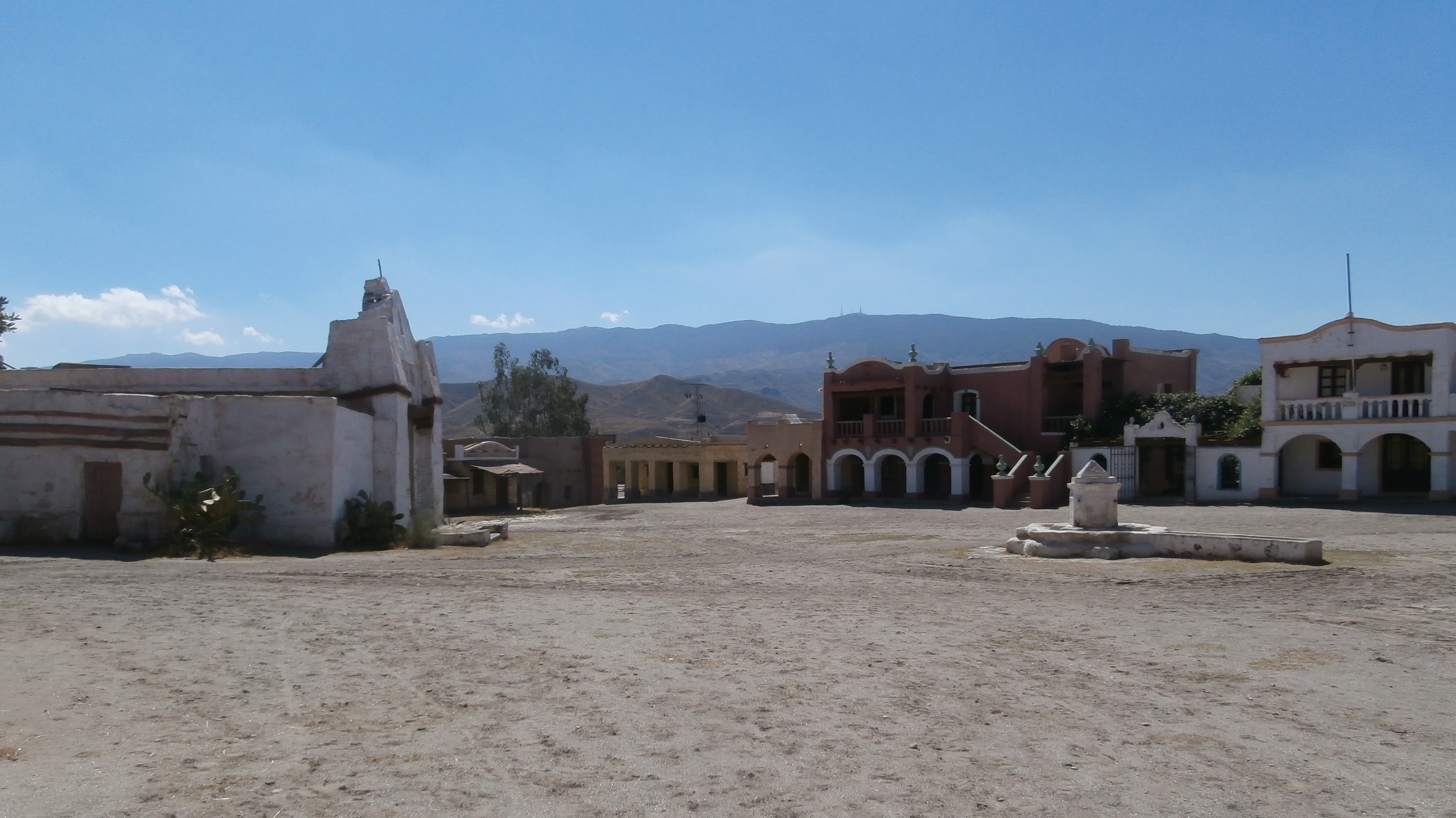
Spanish pueblo in Texas Hollywood

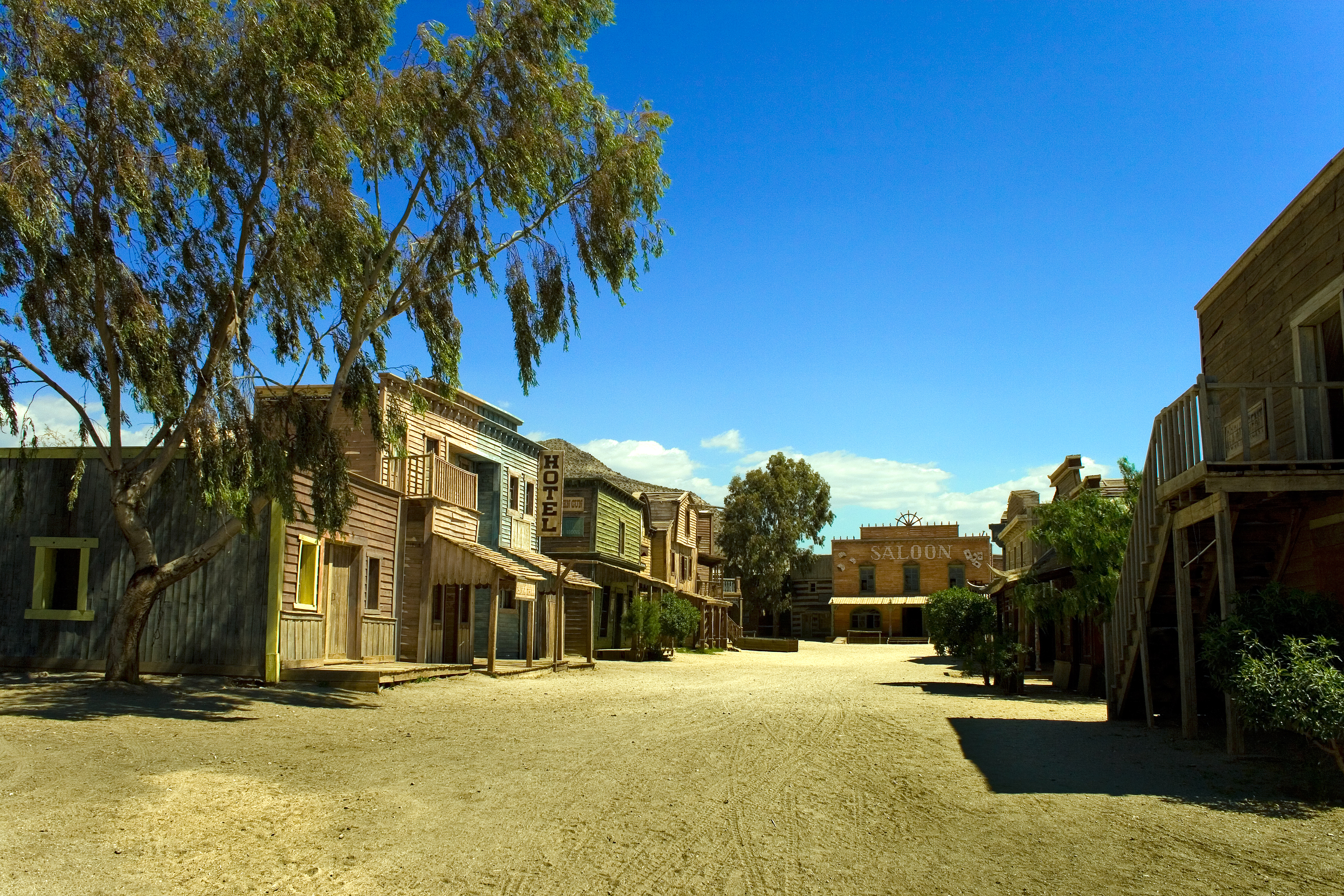
Street view of the Western town in Texas Hollywood

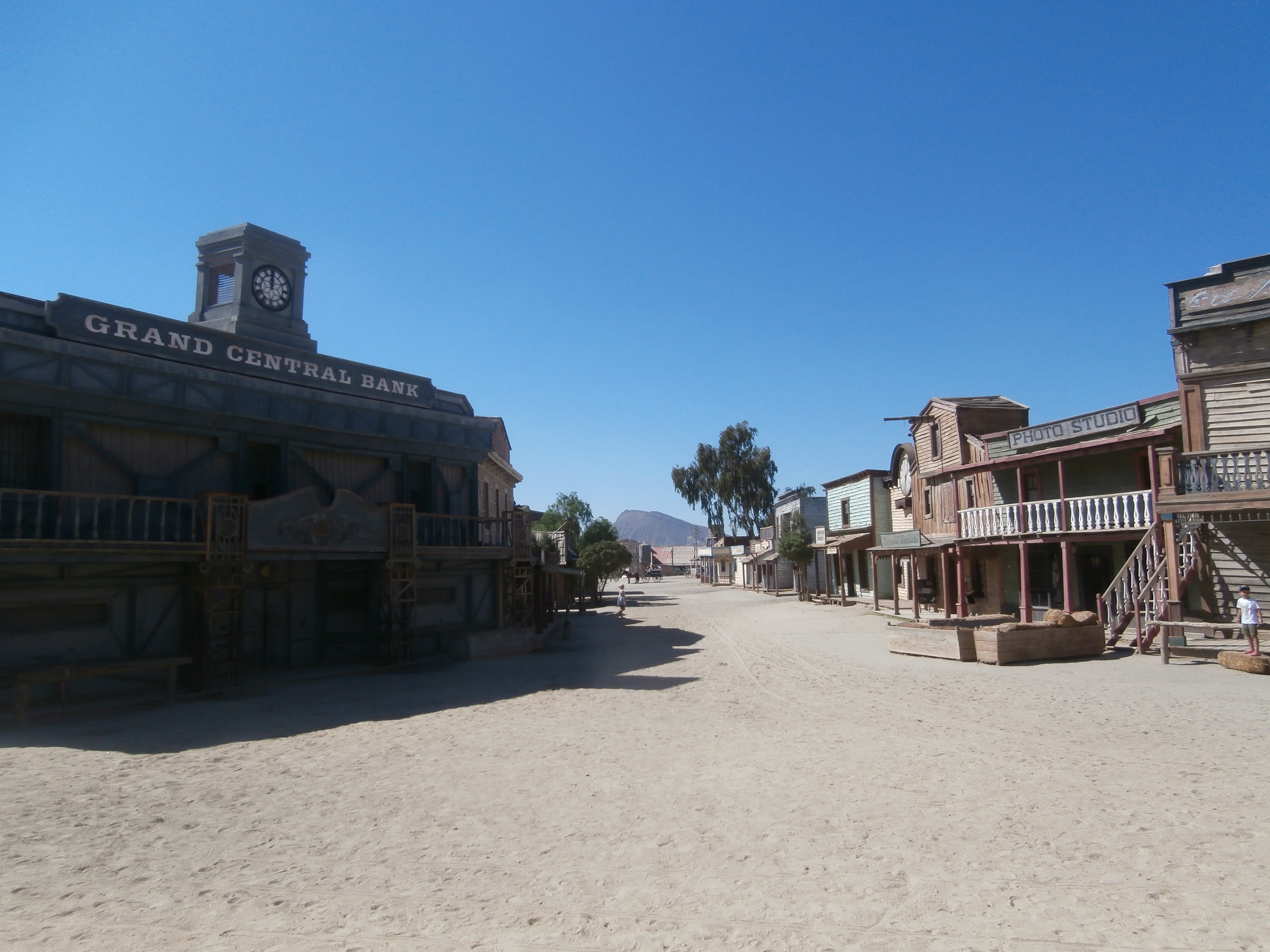
Bank used in "A Town Called Mercy"

== See also ==
- List of films shot in Almeria
- Mini Hollywood
- Western Leone
