= Western Leone =

Spain theme park

Coordinates: 37.032210°N 2.446411°W

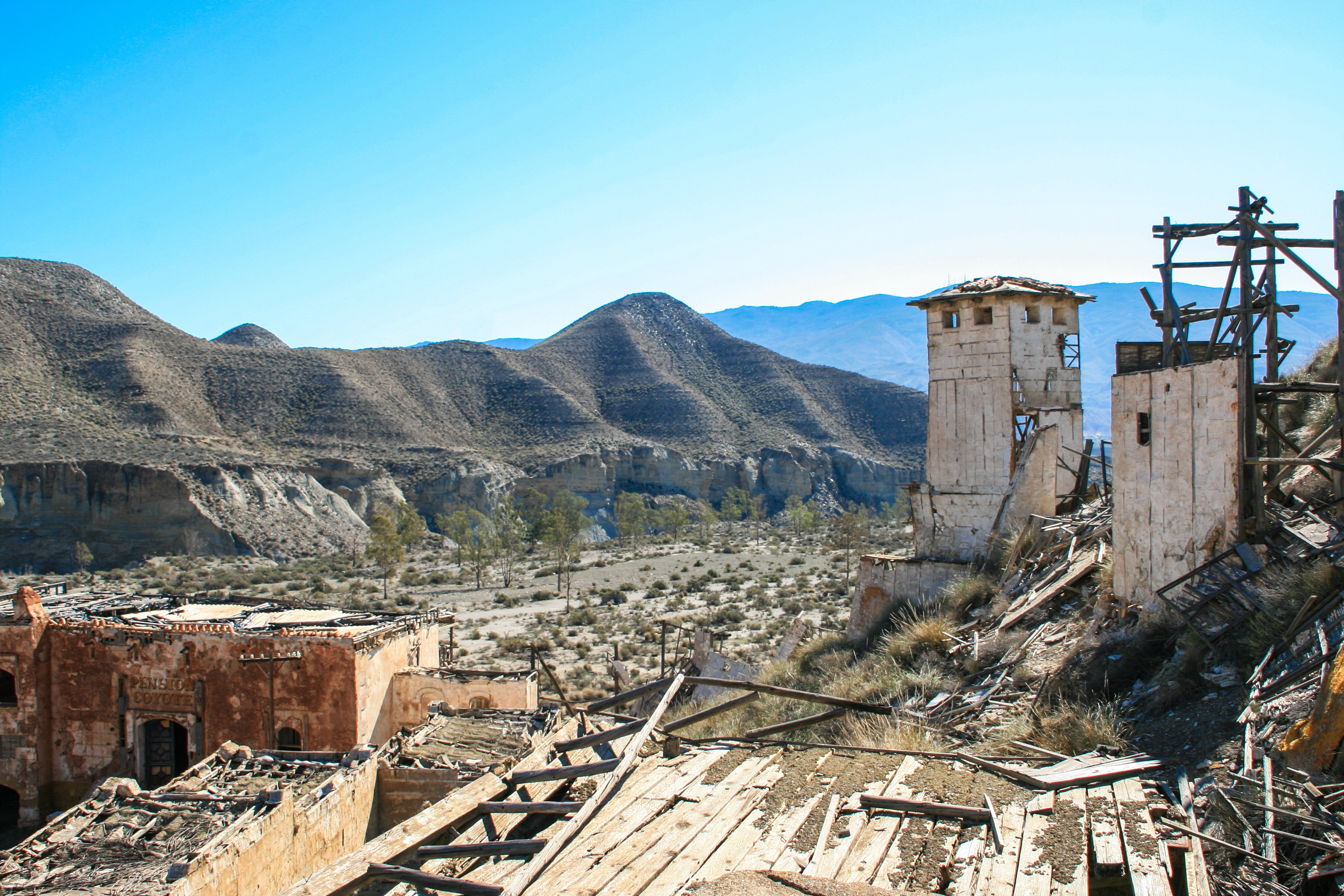
The fortress used in El Condor

Western Leone is a Western-style theme park in the province of Almeria, Andalusia (Spain). Located at the 378.9 km mark on the A-92 motorway, it is the smallest of three such theme parks in the Tabernas Desert; the other two are Mini Hollywood and Texas Hollywood.

Western Leone was originally built to film Sergio Leone's Once Upon a Time in the West (1968); the large red house, around which many of the scenes in the film revolve, is maintained as an attraction, along with other buildings of a Western town. It has also been used to film other Spaghetti Westerns.

In 1970, a fortress was built a short distance from Western Leone. This structure was used as a set for El Condor and later films. The fortress had fallen into disrepair by 1986.

In March 2022, it was for sale 2.5 million euros (86.000m2). In May 2026 it changed to 1.6 million euros. In September 2026 it was again for sale with the same price.

== See also ==
- List of films shot in Almeria
