= Mini Hollywood =

Spanish Western-styled theme park

Coordinates: 37.020382°N 2.432244°W

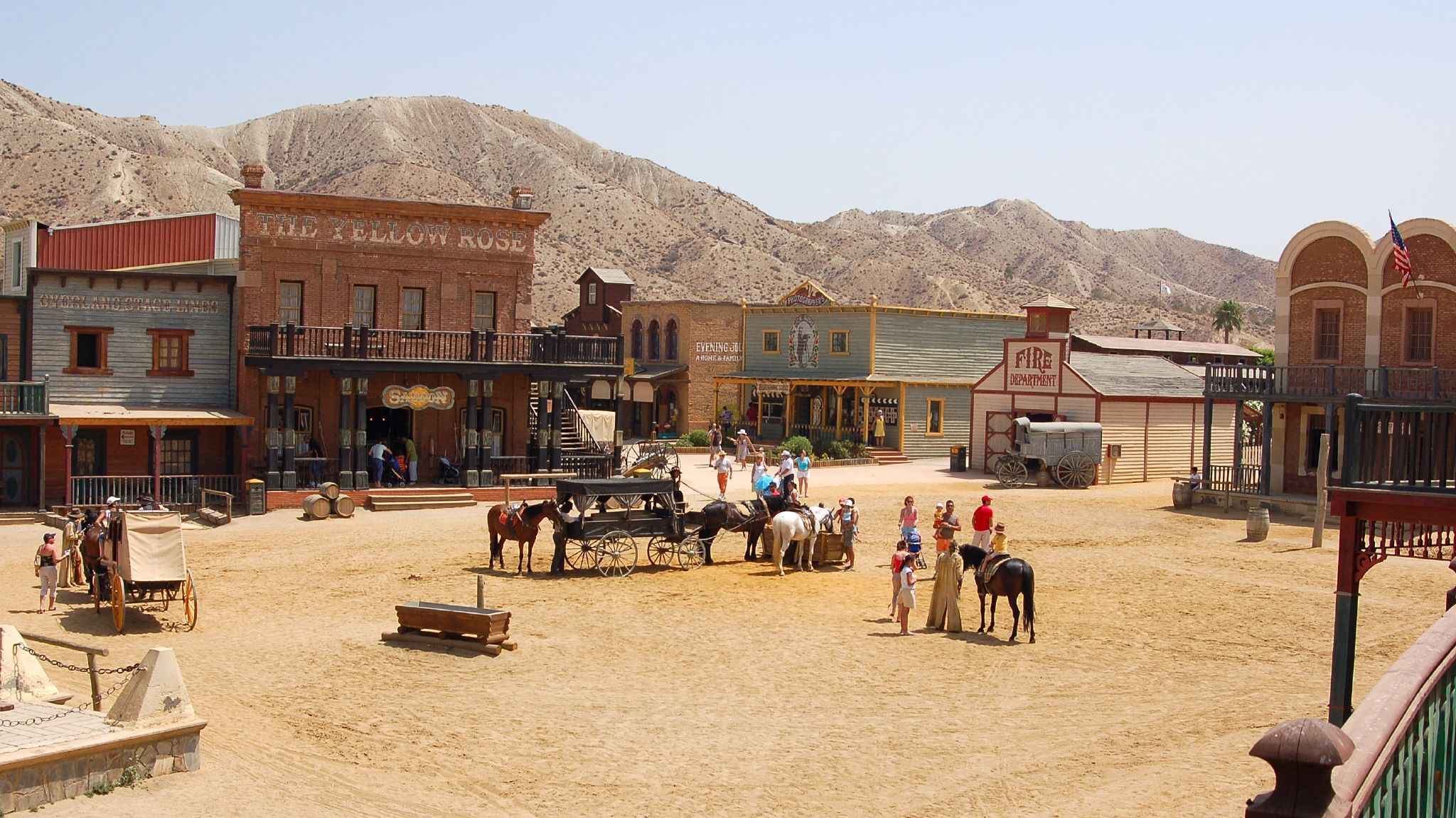
Mini Hollywood's town square.

Oasys (formerly known as Mini Hollywood) is a Spanish Western-styled theme park, located off the 364 km mark of the N-340 road, near the town of Tabernas in the province of Almería, Andalusia. Originally known as Yucca City, the set was designed by Carlo Simi and built for Sergio Leone's For a Few Dollars More in 1965. It was also used as a set for other films, such as The Good, the Bad and the Ugly (1966) and Buddy Goes West (1981).

After filming of The Good, the Bad and the Ugly was completed, the extras in the project bought the set and ran it as a tourist attraction. They were later bought out by a hotel group. The park features daily cowboy stunt shows, such as a mock bank raid and a re-enactment of the final moments of Jesse James. It also has a swimming complex, abandoned gold mine, Cowboy style saloon, a Fun Barn for children's activities, a zoo with birds and big cats in cages and many mock western stores.

The Doctor Who episode "A Town Called Mercy" (2012) was filmed here and at Fort Bravo/Texas Hollywood.

== See also ==
- List of films shot in Almeria
- Texas Hollywood
- Western Leone
