= The Bombing =

The Bombing may refer to:

- Air Strike (2018 film), a Chinese film
- "The Bombing", a nickname of "Episode 3" (Life on Mars, series 2)
