= List of characters in the Life on Mars franchise =

The main characters of Life on Mars, from left: DC Chris Skelton, DCI Gene Hunt, DI Sam Tyler, DS Ray Carling and WPC/DC Annie Cartwright

This is a list of fictional characters that have appeared in BBC One's science fiction/police procedural drama, Life on Mars, and the following series Ashes to Ashes.

== Main characters ==
=== Cast table ===
| Character | Portrayed by | Life on Mars | | Ashes to Ashes | | |
| Character | Portrayed by | 1 | 2 | 1 | 2 | 3 |
|---|---|---|---|---|---|---|
| Gene Hunt | Philip Glenister | Main | Main | Main | Main | Main |
| Sam Tyler | John Simm | Main | Main | | | |
| Annie Cartwright | Liz White | Main | Main | | | |
| Ray Carling | Dean Andrews | Main | Main | Main | Main | Main |
| Chris Skelton | Marshall Lancaster | Main | Main | Main | Main | Main |
| Phyllis Dobbs | Noreen Kershaw | Recurring | Recurring | | | |
| Nelson | Tony Marshall | Recurring | Recurring | | | Guest |
| Alex Drake | Keeley Hawes | | | Main | Main | Main |
| Shaz Granger | Montserrat Lombard | | | Main | Main | Main |
| Viv James | Geff Francis | | | Recurring | Recurring | Recurring |
| Luigi | Joseph Long | | | Recurring | Recurring | Recurring |
| Martin Summers | Adrian Dunbar/Gwilym Lee | | | | Recurring | |
| Jim Keats | Daniel Mays | | | | | Main |

=== Introduced in Life on Mars ===
==== Gene Hunt ====
DCI “Gene Hunt” is played by Philip Glenister in the original British Version of “Life on Mars” and the spin-off series “Ashes to Ashes”. Gene Hunt in “Life on Mars” plays your stereotypical 1970s police officer being homophobic and slightly strange.

==== Sam Tyler ====
Sam Tyler

DCI/DI Sam Tyler is played by John Simm in the original British version of Life on Mars and in the American version he is played by Jason O'Mara. The character of Sam Tyler is the main protagonist within the programme. Sam Tyler was hit by a car in 2006 and woke up in 1973, we follow Sam as he makes discoveries of the world and eventually how he got back and how he changes as a person, in the dramatic closing minutes of “Life on Mars” Sam Tyler takes his own life to return to the world of 1973.

==== Annie Cartwright ====
WPC/DC Annie Cartwright is portrayed by Liz White. During the first series of Life on Mars, the character was a Woman Police Constable serving in uniform. Early in the second series, DCI Gene Hunt allows her to join CID as Woman Detective Constable. Throughout both series, Cartwright helps the programme's protagonist, Sam Tyler adjust to life in the Seventies. Cartwright is the only person in 1973 who Sam tells that he has travelled back in time, and she treats him sympathetically, believing that he is suffering from severe concussion after being hit by a car. During the first episode of series one, when Sam climbs onto the police station roof, considering suicide, Cartwright convinces him not to jump. Upon Sam first losing consciousness after the car accident which sent him back in time, he sees a fleeting image of a woman in a red dress running away from an attacker. The image is later revealed to be a childhood memory of Annie chasing after Sam's father, and being attacked by him. No references are made to Annie's family in either the first or second series, apart from a mention of an unnamed nephew in "Episode 1", which indicates that she has a brother or sister.

In the US remake, Annie Norris (Gretchen Mol) is a uniformed policewoman with an undergraduate psychology education who has aspirations of making the detective squad. Norris constantly struggles against sexist attitudes about the role of a woman in police work. Owing to her gender, her nickname among the detectives is "No Nuts Norris". She is the only one on the force to whom Sam has revealed that he is from the future – although she does not seem to believe him, she is the most sympathetic of his colleagues; she puts more faith in his claim after a prophecy from Sam saves her life from Vic Tyler in the counterpart episode to the BBC's first series finale. She is promoted to detective in the finale.

==== Ray Carling ====
DC/DS/DI Raymond Milton "Ray" Carling is portrayed by Dean Andrews.

Ray Carling is shown to be similar in character to his boss, DCI Gene Hunt. During Life on Mars, Carling often prefers Hunt's brutality and corruption over DI Sam Tyler's ideas. Carling has also been described by the BBC's website as Hunt's "right-hand man when it comes to fighting, shooting, gambling and the ladies". Throughout the series, Carling frequently clashes with Sam Tyler regarding his policing methods. It is revealed that Carling had applied for promotion to DI (Detective Inspector), but was passed over for the apparently transferred Sam Tyler, fuelling his grudge against Tyler. During episode 7 of the first series, Billy Kemble is arrested on drug-related charges. In an attempt to make him reveal his supplier, Carling and Chris Skelton force-feed Kemble cocaine, but Kemble has a heart attack and dies in police custody. After an extensive cover-up operation, Hunt angrily demotes Carling to DC (Detective Constable). After a period of time as a DC, Hunt re-promotes Carling to DS in series 2, episode 1, which he remains at for the next decade until 1983 in Ashes to Ashes.

During episode 3 of the second series, Carling is blown up by a car bomb and hospitalized. A short time before the explosion, Sam Tyler claims it is a hoax and not the IRA as he knows from 2006 that they never used dynamite. Carling believes Tyler and investigates, only to be caught in the explosion. He suffers severe post-traumatic stress disorder after his release from hospital and unwittingly compromises Tyler's investigations. He is, however, hailed a hero by the rest of CID. During series 2 he drove a Morris Marina.

Alongside Gene Hunt and Chris Skelton, Carling moved from Manchester to London and joined the Metropolitan Police shortly after the death of Sam Tyler in 1980. Despite Carling openly being racist and sexist during Life on Mars, he is consistently displayed to have an improved attitude throughout Ashes to Ashes. Unlike his disdain for DI Tyler in 1973, he forms a good working relationship with DI Alex Drake and, most of the time, fully respects her authority over him, despite her gender. During the third series in 1983, Carling is promoted to a DI while Hunt is on the run for Drake's shooting, and takes overall charge of CID. When Hunt returns with Drake, he hastily disregards and lampoons Carling's efforts, describing him as looking like a "maths teacher". Carling goes on to ruin a stake-out during a hostage situation, but after the case is solved, Hunt acknowledges that it was a difficult operation and finally applauds his ability and effort. It is also revealed that Ray's father and grandfather were in the army, but Ray never joined himself as he went out drinking on the night he was supposed to sign up and never got around to going because he was scared, his relationship with his father subsequently souring despite his successes in the force. In series 2 in 1982, Carling actually fills out an army application form, but when he asks Alex Drake to write a reference, she takes the form and rips it up into little pieces, convincing him to stay. Ray, along with Shaz and Chris, endures visions of stars and space and hears strange voices, like that of in a pub, and described by Chris as Nelson (Tony Marshall), the publican from Life on Mars, asking him what is he having to drink. Although he initially dismisses it as alcohol-related, he is eventually brought round by Shaz and the three of them share the vision together in the street outside Luigi's. He drives a MkII Ford Granada 2.8S.

Along with Chris and Shaz, it is revealed that Ray Carling had previously died in the real world. As a young DC, he had been struggling with the feeling that he had failed his father and grandfathers, who were all army sergeants, after he failed basic training for entry to the Army. Ray took out his frustrations on a drunk young man outside a pub and ended up killing him, something which his DCI covered up. Ridden with guilt, he committed suicide by hanging himself in a bout of severe depression and alcohol abuse, on 6 May 1972, the day of that year's FA Cup Final.

The character displays homophobic, racist and sexist attitudes throughout Life on Mars. During Life on Mars, Carling has little respect for Sam Tyler, due to their disagreements over policing methods and Tyler's getting the job to which Carling hoped to be promoted. In Episode 5 of series 1, Carling is shown to be a big Manchester United fan, even faking an illness in order to get time off work to attend the Manchester derby match. By 1981, when the first series of Ashes to Ashes is set, Carling resents having a female superior, DI Alex Drake and is still sexist and opposed to having women in CID. However, during the second and third series he is much more willing to work with Drake and respects her as his senior officer and equal colleague. In Ashes to Ashes season 3, episode 3, Carling shows more of his true personality, which he usually hides under bluster and banter. However, as the series moves on, he returns to his usual self until the final few episodes, when he once again becomes more open towards Chris and Shaz as they share the visions they are experiencing. During series 2, it is revealed that Carling is a Freemason, and holds the rank of Tyler. He notes the ironic nature of the title.

==== Chris Skelton ====
PC/DC Christopher Daniel "Chris" Skelton is portrayed by Marshall Lancaster.

The character of Chris Skelton has been described as a "dogsbody" who is a "cheeky but likeable character" by the BBC's Life on Mars website. Throughout both series of Life on Mars, Skelton finds himself torn between the "old and the new ways of policing", represented by Gene Hunt and Sam Tyler, respectively. He is generally regarded as a waste of space by Hunt throughout both series and plays only minor roles in the storylines that unfold. Skelton finally proves himself in series 2 episode 6, saving Hunt, Tyler and Annie Cartwright (Liz White) from death when he shoots Big Bird. Unlike Ray Carling, Skelton eventually comes to respect Tyler and begins to emulate his modern policing methods, such as tape-recording interviews years before it became standard procedure. Tyler also helps Skelton overcome his clumsiness, nervousness and naivety. During the finale of the first series of Life on Mars, Skelton informs Tyler: "I don't underestimate you Boss, I just don't understand you".

Alongside Gene Hunt and Ray Carling, Chris moved from Manchester to London and joined the Metropolitan Police shortly after the death of Sam Tyler in 1980. By the time in which Ashes to Ashes is set in 1981, eight years since that of Life on Mars set in 1973, Chris' confidence, maturity and policing skills are displayed to have improved. During one episode, he described himself as "cautious rather than nervous" (as opposed to his demeanour in Life on Mars). During the programme, Chris enters into a relationship with fellow officer Sharon Granger. Chris proposes to her in the second episode of season two and they become engaged.

Series two of Ashes to Ashes follows Gene Hunt and Alex Drake battling to put an end to police corruption and searching for an officer who is fabricating and disposing of evidence within Fenchurch East CID. During the penultimate episode of the second series, Chris is revealed to be the mole in CID, explaining that to pay for an engagement ring for Shaz he accepted money from corrupt officers. Chris initially thought that he could infiltrate the group and learn who was involved, but the more tasks he performed, the more involved he became, and he found it impossible to tell either Hunt or Drake about what was happening to him. Ashamed, Chris quietly attempts to resign from CID. A disgusted Hunt views the resignation as cowardice and refuses, telling him that although Chris will not go to prison, he has no choice but to stay on and bear the consequences of his betrayal. The revelation of his betrayal ostracizes him within CID and casts serious doubts on his relationship with Shaz. However, in the final episode of the second series, Chris puts himself in danger by agreeing to go along with the corrupt officers' robbery plan; this eases tensions between Chris and the other characters and his relationship with Shaz recovers, as she admits that she still loves him because "he cares when he gets it wrong".

During episode one of the third series, it is revealed that Chris and Shaz have split up, though the details are undisclosed; however, in episode 6 series 3, when he and Ray believe they are about to die, Chris says that if he does not make it, Ray should tell Shaz that Chris still loves her. In episode 7 series 3, Chris's working relationship with Hunt is strained due to him laughing at a mishap at Viv James's funeral and spilling his drink at the wake. Chris then disobeys an order from Hunt and the two fight in the office. Later on, Chris refers to Hunt as "the best DCI I've ever had" and says he is "proud to have worked under [him]"; however, he also tells Hunt, "I'm not going to be your doormat any longer. Those days are over." After this, the two of them make up. Throughout the third season, Chris, Shaz, and Ray all have disturbing and intrusive visions of a sky of stars, and at times hear strange voices, like those heard in a pub. In episode seven, following the resolution of his argument with Hunt, Chris says he recognises the voice as that of Nelson (Tony Marshall), the landlord of The Railway Arms from Life on Mars, asking him what he is having to drink.

During the finale it is revealed that, in reality, Skelton was dead. On 14 February 1975, whilst serving as a uniformed constable, his Sergeant told him to "do as he is told", which was for Chris to move out into the open at the blow of his Sergeant's whistle, resulting in him being gunned down and killed. Chris ponders on how he acted as a dogsbody for the Sergeant and did absolutely whatever he asked, just like his relationship with DCI Hunt, which he changes after standing up to Hunt in series three, episode seven. He reunites with Shaz when she kisses him before entering The Railway Arms and crossing over to the other side. She tells him that she loves him "forever and a day", to which he responds: "Fab."

=== Introduced in Ashes to Ashes ===
==== Alex Drake ====
DI Alexandra "Alex" Drake is portrayed by Keeley Hawes and as a child by Lucy Cole. The character of Alex Drake is the main protagonist of Ashes to Ashes. The character has been described as "ballsy, confident and bright", along with being "perceptive in deduction" and "understanding the workings of the criminal mind". During the first episode of Ashes to Ashes, it is revealed that Alex Drake is the unnamed police psychologist mentioned in the finale of Life on Mars, who interviewed and recorded case notes of Sam Tyler's time in 1973 and studied his subsequent suicide, as witnessed in the finale of Life on Mars. During the opening scenes of the first episode, Drake, while driving her daughter Molly to school is unexpectedly called to a hostage situation near the embankment of the River Thames. Upon arriving, she is informed that the hostage taker, Arthur Layton is demanding to speak to her, despite Drake having no knowledge of him. Drake eventually negotiates the release of the civilian hostage in favour of herself. This prompts Drake's frightened daughter, Molly to rush past the cordon into the middle of the situation. Arthur Layton takes hold of Molly and rushes down the steps to the river's edge, followed by Drake shortly after to find her daughter unharmed with Layton missing. Upon returning to her car she fails to notice Layton in the back, who forces her at gunpoint to a disused barge and tells her that he knew her parents who died in 1981, Tim and Caroline Price. Shortly after, Layton shoots Drake in the head.

Following the shooting, Drake finds herself in 1981 less than fourteen weeks before the death of her parents, Tim and Caroline Price. Upon waking, she finds herself in the same location - on the barge which is host to a party. From studying Sam Tyler's notes, Drake is familiar with Gene Hunt, Ray Carling and Chris Skelton, and is so surprised to learn they actually exist, that she faints upon first seeing Hunt. After shocking the unit with the revelation she is the DI of the squad, Drake learns that Hunt, Carling and Skelton transferred to London following the death of Sam Tyler a year previously. Drake initially believes that she has assimilated Tyler's notes to create this world, and addresses her new colleagues as if they are not real. As well as this, Drake uses a dictaphone to record her experiences and frequently searches for radio communications and television images for information about her, knowing that Sam Tyler received information this way. As the first series progresses, Drake comes to believe that she has been sent back to 1981 in order to save her parents from death. Along with this, Drake is constantly haunted by hallucinations of "The Clown". Eventually, it is revealed that her father Tim is the clown and that he arranged to blow himself up along with his wife, Caroline, and daughter, Alex, by hiring Arthur Layton to rig a car bomb after finding that Caroline was having an affair with Evan White.

By the second series (set in 1982) Alex Drake is shown to have become more at ease with her life in the 1980s, and that her relationship with Gene Hunt has improved to the point where they work separately from the rest of the team and conduct unofficial investigations. In the first episode of the series, Drake is attacked by an unknown man who attempts to interrogate her about this world. After this incident, she realises she is being stalked by the same, who later is revealed to be Martin Summers who claims to be able to help her return to the present day. Coinciding with the Martin Summers plot, the main storyline witnesses Drake and Hunt working together in order to uncover corruption within Fenchurch East CID. After several discoveries and unofficial investigations led by Hunt and Drake, it is revealed that their superior officer, Charlie Mackintosh is heavily involved in the web of corruption. During episode four, Mackintosh kills himself and shortly before dying warns Drake and Hunt of "Operation Rose", but is unable to reveal more detail. Shortly afterwards, Drake becomes aware that the 1982 younger version of Martin Summers is working in Fenchurch East Police Station. The older Summers arranges a meeting with both Drake and the 1982 Summers, leading to the older Summers shooting the younger. The older Summers forces the firearm used into Drake's hand to incriminate her, prompting Drake to dispose of both the body and firearm in cement.

Towards the end of the series, it is revealed that Operation Rose is the unofficial codename and call-sign for a gold bullion robbery masterminded by a web of corrupt police officers, involving the older version of Martin Summers, who returned to 1982 as his younger self stood by when the robbery happened in the real world. During the series finale, Hunt shoots and kills the older version of Summers and goes on to accidentally shoot Alex Drake. Upon waking in the present day, Drake observes Hunt screaming at her to wake up from her comatose state in 1982 through hospital monitor screens. It is then made clear that Martin Summers was a comatose patient a few rooms away from Alex Drake in the same hospital, explaining his ability to hear discussions about Alex's condition.

During the first episode, Drake finds seemingly herself back in the present day. Along with talking to a therapist about her dreams of Hunt heroically chasing criminals in his Audi Quattro, to the sound of "Ride of the Valkyries", she observes Sharon Granger, Chris Skelton, Ray Carling and Gene Hunt visit her in hospital and ask her for help in differing forms through television screens. She re-awakens in 1983, with Hunt slapping her to bring her out of her coma in order to help clear his name. Following her return to the 1980s, Hunt explains that after his accidental shooting of her he was accused of attempted murder and fled to the Isle of Wight and the Costa del Sol for a period of three months. During the series, Drake is haunted by visions of a police officer with severe exit wounds to the left side of his face. Speculating that this relates to Sam Tyler, she tries to discover the truth about his death. Evidence and hints from the ghost and DCI Keats increasingly point to Gene having a hand in the incident. Although she begins to have more romantic feelings towards Hunt, his reluctance to tell her the truth leaves Drake wondering if he murdered Tyler.

In the finale, Drake follows clues from the ghost and Keats to a shallow grave in rural Lancashire, where she believes Sam to be buried. However, the body is that of the dead police officer haunting Drake and is identified as a young Gene Hunt. Drake learns she is trapped in a purgatory where Gene is a guide or male Valkyrie for dead police officers, while Keats is a demon tempting them to hell. She realises her temporary return to 2008 was just a hallucination within this purgatory and finally accepts she died of her injuries. Drake grieves that she cannot reunite with her daughter, before bidding a sad farewell to Gene as she passes on to the Railway Arms pub (a police analogue to Valhalla) with Ray, Chris, and Shaz.

Alex is initially portrayed as convinced that her experiences in the 1980s are fantasy, being played out in her mind during the final seconds of her life after being shot. In the early episodes of the first series, Drake addresses her colleagues as "imaginary constructs" and mimes air quotes when saying their names. After her parents were blown up in a carbombing, Drake remembers someone taking her hand as a little girl. Drake always assumed the hand belonged to Evan White, but once she went back to 1981 and witnessed her parents' death she observes it was Hunt who took her hand. This causes her to question whether Hunt is in fact a real person. The series 3 finale explains that the 'Gene Hunt world' is in fact a purgatory for police officers with the Railway Arms pub acting as a 'gateway' to heaven.

==== Shaz Granger ====
WPC/DC Sharon "Shaz" Granger is a fictional character in BBC One's science fiction/police procedural drama, Ashes to Ashes. The character is portrayed by Montserrat Lombard. The character's look and style are based on Joanne Catherall of The Human League in 1981.

The character of Sharon Granger is described as "friendly, eager and helpful" by the programme's official website. Granger joined Gene Hunt's Criminal Investigation Department two years prior to the second series, acting as a uniformed aide with responsibility for administration. During the first two series, Granger is shown to be unfulfilled with her current tasks within CID. Despite having been referred to as a "lobotomised Essex girl" by Gene Hunt, Granger has demonstrated a "keen intelligence and diverse knowledge" on literature, history and the arts. She has a more progressive attitude than many of her colleagues, frequently challenging them on their various prejudices. She is also a supporter of the Labour party, and opposes Thatcher. Following the arrival of protagonist Alex Drake in the series, the two become friends.

During the second series, Granger enters into a relationship with Chris Skelton and eventually they become engaged. During the first episode of the third series, it is revealed that Granger and Skelton are no longer together; however, they mend their relationship in the finale. Granger is also close to Alex Drake, who tells the comatose Sharon that she is her "favourite imaginary construct", because she "is so alive". Granger expresses her admiration of Drake throughout the series, describing her as "the most amazing woman [she's] ever met". Granger has a strained relationship with Ray Carling, whose sexism means he often mocks her and doesn't take her seriously. They also clash on many political issues, such as Carling's support of Thatcher and his dismissal of opposition to apartheid, leading her to call him "intolerant", "prejudiced", and "racist". During episode two of the second series, Granger reveals that her mother is Romani, after hearing Carling making antiziganistic remarks. Their relationship improves over the course of the third season, with Carling telling Granger that he is "very proud to be a colleague of [hers]" in the second episode. In the fifth episode of the third season, the two sing a duet of 'Danny Boy' on stage together. Ray also confides in Shaz about his visions of stars, and she comforts him when they later share these visions. Granger admires DCI Hunt, calling him "brave as a lion", however, in the third season, she becomes frustrated with his harsh treatment of her and her colleagues, especially Chris, and with his inability to keep his promise of promoting her to CID. She overcomes this in the finale by obeying his orders to leave Keats and join the undercover operation.

During episode two of the third series, Granger contemplates leaving the Metropolitan Police. However, after she goes on an undercover operation to catch a serial killer - during which she saves herself from an attempt on her life by stabbing her attacker with a screwdriver - and Hunt promises to allow her into CID by Christmas, she decides to stay. After she accepts Hunt's offer, there is a brief musical cue of 'Life On Mars' and a close up of a spaced out Granger. A voice can also be heard; this is later revealed by Chris, who has a similar experience, to be that of Nelson, the landlord of The Railway Arms from Life on Mars. This moment seems to symbolise the resolution of her internal conflict relating to her revelation in the finale, as on this occasion she is able to successfully defend herself. Along with this, Shaz, Ray and Chris all have worrying visions of stars throughout the third season.

During episode 7 of the first series, Granger attempts to apprehend an armed and dangerous Gil Hollis, shortly after he fired upon the team while they were taking cover in Luigi's trattoria opposite Fenchurch East Police Station. After eventually nearing Hollis, Granger tackles him to the ground, the knife Hollis is holding penetrating her stomach as they fall. Once Alex Drake, Chris Skelton, Ray Carling, and Gene Hunt arrive at the scene, Drake carries out CPR on Granger. After Drake's attempts seem to have failed, Hunt orders Hollis to his knees and allows Skelton and Carling to violently assault him while he is in police custody, despite the protest of Viv James. However, Drake manages to revive Granger and she is taken to hospital. During episode 8, Granger recovers and joins the group again.

During the finale it is revealed that, in reality, Shaz is already dead. She was killed in 1995 (although in the original script of the finale she died on 19 April 1996). while attempting to apprehend a would-be car thief stealing a Ford Sierra. The thief stabbed her in the abdomen with a screwdriver, leaving her to bleed to death. The world she occupies during the series is a form of limbo. After Alex persuades Gene to join the undercover operation that Chris, Shaz and Ray have organised, he radios through to Ray, Chris and Shaz just as DCI Jim Keats is going to take them away. After persuading Ray and Chris to return to him, Gene radios Shaz and informs her that "Shaz, you are now promoted to Detective Constable, effective immediately". Granger is the first to return to Gene and Alex just before the sting. She and Chris are reunited before crossing over into 'the pub', together with Ray and Alex. Before leaving, she gives Hunt a peck on the cheek, Hunt telling her "you keep [Chris] out of trouble, Detective Constable Granger".

==== Viv James ====
Sergeant Viv James first appears in series one as a uniformed sergeant working in the front office of Fenchurch East Police Station. During episode seven, Shaz Granger is stabbed by Gil Hollis and in retaliation, Gene Hunt allows Chris Skelton and Ray Carling to violently assault Hollis while he is cuffed and in police custody. James pleads with the officers to stop, and eventually receives an apology from Hunt.

During episode six of the third series, James enters HMP Fenchurch East in order to quell a major prison riot along with his colleagues, and on their retreat he is left behind and taken hostage by those inside. It is later revealed that he arranged with Jason Sacks, the orchestrator of the riot, to bring in a firearm in return for another prisoner to admit to the crime his nephew is being held for, allowing his release. During the episode, James is shot and while the riot is underway he single-handedly defends the wing his cousin is held on. He is later shot again by Jason Sacks and as he lies dying, he is found by DCI Jim Keats, who makes no attempt to help him, but places his hands either side of his head while he dies, claiming when the rest of the team arrives that James was already dead when he got there; Gene instructs the rest of the team to claim that James was simply injured in the riot without revealing his role in it.[3] In the finale Chris mentions a dream he had of Viv surrounded by flames; given the episode's revelations about the characters all being in an afterlife, who Keats is and how Viv died, the implication is that Viv has ended up in Hell.

==== The Clown ====
The Clown (Andrew Clover) is the main antagonist during the first series, dressed in a Pierrot costume resembling that worn by David Bowie in the music video for Ashes to Ashes and on the album cover, appears to have a similar role to the Test Card Girl from Life On Mars, offering Alex Drake cryptic messages, often in her daughter's voice. Unlike the Test Card Girl, the Clown frequently appears in the background of scenes. On Andrew Clover's website the character is referred to as The Angel of Death.

In any near death experiences adult Alex has until 10 October 1981, the Clown appears, often distorted and blurred out of Alex's own vision. The clown stalks Alex frequently throughout the first series. In the seventh episode of the series the clown speaks in what is clearly Alex's father's voice while delivering a dangerous threat.

It is seen in the climax of episode 1.8, "Alex's Big Day" that the clown and Drake's father, Tim Price, are one and the same person. Moments before his death, Tim Price removes his glasses, and is perceived by adult Alex to transform into the clown before smiling and winking at her. Startled by the horrific revelation, she has only time enough to ask "Dad?" before the car detonates in front of her.

The Clown is briefly visible to WPC Sharon Granger when she is stabbed and approaches clinical death in episode 1.7, "Charity Begins at Home". She pleads with DC Chris Skelton, "Tell it to go away! I don't like clowns!"

Since her parents' deaths, adult Alex is no longer stalked by the Clown. The Clown (or, arguably, David Bowie in the same Pierrot costume) appears in the lower left area of Luigi's celebrity mural at the close of Episode 1.8, at which time neither Alex nor Shaz seems to take any notice when walking toward it,; it is gone again from the mural in the second series.

==== Martin Summers ====
Martin Summers (Gwilym Lee [younger] & Adrian Dunbar [older]) served as the main antagonist of the second series. Summers is – like Alex Drake – simultaneously lying in a hospital bed in 2008, and alive and well concurrently with his younger self in 1982. He is referred to as "Doctor Death" by DCI Gene Hunt in episode 2.1, and uses the alias "Boris Johnson" in episode 2.5, much like Sam Tyler's tendency to use future celebrity names as aliases in 1973.

Originally from Wicklow, Ireland, he is described by Sergeant Viv James as being approximately the same height as Hunt, and in his mid-fifties. His younger self - first shown in the trailer for Episode 2.7 - is, therefore, approximately 25–30 years of age in 1982, at which time he is a police constable (PC). He holds back the crowds during the 6 September 1997 funeral of Diana, Princess of Wales, and retires from the police service in disgrace at an unspecified date sometime thereafter, but it is revealed in the series finale that he was a detective inspector (DI).

In 2008, Summers is dying slowly and painfully. It is generally believed that from his hospital bed, he sees the BBC News report of DI Alex Drake's disappearance, although the bedridden viewer's identity has not been definitively shown. It is confirmed that he knows of Alex's subsequent discovery, gunshot wound to her head and that her daughter, Molly, has rushed to the hospital. Older Summers knows when Drake is about to undergo surgery to remove the bullet and telephones her in 1982 to tell her, although Alex already knows, having seen a vision of herself being wheeled into surgery He sends her dead roses to suggest she's missed her chance. As Drake recovers from brain surgery, a nurse informs a physician that "the coma patient in room five is having a seizure." It is not yet revealed if that patient is Summers.

On an unspecified date, Summers is transported back in time to an equally unspecified date, sometime before 4 May 1982 Like Drake and Tyler, he feels very lost, alone, and frightened; he wonders if he is dead, mad, or dreaming in a hospital bed far away, and whether he is the first to ever have such an experience. Also like the other two time-travellers, it is his world's unimaginable level of detail that first gives him reason to suspect that it is real; in Summers case, he notices that the sparrow pecking at the woodlice from under his window sill had a little tuft of feathers missing from its back, and asks himself, "Martin, how can this level of detail exist in a bloody dream?!" Whilst living in an East London flat, he keeps a journal of his experiences on a Corona typewriter.

In 1982, Summers' older self is involved with a project known as "Operation Rose", involving members of the London Metropolitan Police, including Detective Superintendent Charlie Mackintosh and at least one other policeman at Fenchurch East.

Eventually, Summers' older self takes notice of DI Alex Drake and postulates that she is his kindred spirit from 2008. On 4 May 1982, he or his agent scribbles "Pont de l'Alma" across evidence photographs to get Alex's attention. That same day, he abducts her in Soho with a rag soaked in chloroform or a similar substance and straps her to a medical table for interrogation while concealing his identity with a surgical mask and letting her scream into an open radio microphone. He escapes as DCI Hunt enters to rescue Alex. He leaves a series of red roses on her desk and in her flat, and periodically telephones her. He stalks her and watches her sleep.

On 8 November 1982, Summers, using the name Boris Johnson, leaves a card for Alex at Sgt. James' front desk, asking to meet at Luigi's at 22:15 that night. He arrives early and leaves another card under Alex's dinner rolls, apologising for missing her, and then follows her into the otherwise vacant CID to introduce himself. He remains calm when the colour drains from Alex's terrified face and she aims her sidearm at him. He tells Alex that he can get her back home to 2008, but only if she cooperates with Operation Rose; he gives her a day to consider. Despite Alex's yearning to get back to her daughter, she refuses to be corrupted and rejects Summers' offer.

Having assembled a team, older Summers appropriates vehicles and has his subordinate at Fenchurch East remove the dockets that would have traced the vehicles back to them. He believes that he is "literally making the cosmos turn for [his] benefit."

Summers leaves 1982 roughly one minute before Drake does, each having been shot by Gene Hunt. Whereas Drake loses consciousness in 1982 and awakes from her separately gunshot-induced coma in 2008, Summers simultaneously dies on the ground in 1982 and in his hospital bed in 2008. His draped corpse is wheeled past Drake's hospital room and her daughter, Molly. This confirmed the previous implication that the two were in the same hospital such that Summers was able to know Drake's 2008 medical condition in 1982; his room was presumably within earshot of those discussing her status, such as medical personnel, police, and/or Molly Drake and Evan White.

However, in the final episode of Ashes to Ashes (Series 3, Episode 8) it is implied that Alex never actually woke up in hospital following her gunshot wound, and that the time she believes she has spent in 2008 following her recovery - and prior to her return to 1983 - were also in fact part of Gene Hunt's reality. As she was aware that Summers was from her own time, it is reasonable to assume that the draped corpse was imagined as something Drake would have expected to encounter upon recovering. With that in mind, the real fate of Martin Summers is unspecified, although it is still strongly implied that he did die in 2008.

==== Jim Keats ====
DCI Jim Keats appears as the main antagonist of the third series, as an officer sent from the Discipline and Complaints Department (D&C) to assess Fenchurch East CID as part of Operation Countryman. During episode one, Keats quietly vows to Hunt that he will "dismantle the station around him" and that he knows "what Hunt really did", along with informing Alex Drake that he'll "help her" and that he knows "what she is going through".

Upon finding that Drake requested old files and statements regarding the death of Sam Tyler, Keats informs Drake that he thinks Hunt killed Tyler. Keats also claims in his debut episode to have an extensive knowledge of the Bible. Throughout the series, Keats tries to drive a wedge between Hunt and his team. He does this by managing to convince Sharon Granger to resign and convinces Ray Carling to risk his life to make up for "mistakes made in the past". The true extent to which he is willing to take his vendetta is revealed when, upon discovering the badly-injured Viv James in the aftermath of a prison riot, he actually watches James die, placing a hand either side of his head, rather than attempting to provide medical assistance, and later claiming that James was dead when he found him to further damage Hunt in the eyes of his colleagues. In the final episode it is strongly implied that Keats is in fact the Devil, a detail confirmed by the writers and actor in an interview on the BBC website. Having smashed Hunt's reality by having each character remember their violent death, he hopes to have them abandon Gene and join him. While Alex refuses outright, Ray, Chris and Shaz leave with him, but eventually change their minds after he calls the lift (the door code to which is 666). The three hear screams from below and the lift comically says "Lift Going Down" (if the characters had entered the lift, it is implied they would have been taken down to hell, a detail again confirmed by the writers in an interview on the BBC website). The trio, alongside Alex, "go to the pub", passing on from their lives in the 1980s. Defeated, Keats slinks away, but not before remarking that he and Gene will see one another again, implying that he will continue to try to prevent Gene from redeeming the souls of dead police officers so that they go to Heaven rather than Keats’ dominion, Hell.

==== Luigi ====
Luigi is the owner of a basement trattoria directly opposite the façade of the Fenchurch East police station. Given its proximity, the CID dine and/or drink there after work, and DI Alex Drake resides in a flat upstairs. An Italian immigrant, he is at times either visibly irritated, exasperated, or amused by DS Ray Carling's and DC Chris Skelton's ethnic humour and DCI Gene Hunt's general abuse. He detects that Hunt and Drake are attracted to each other, and repeatedly encourages Hunt to pursue those feelings. He is quite fond of his neighbour, Drake. He cooks her veal scaloppine using his late mother's special recipe for the sauce which he does not serve to the other police officers who frequent his trattoria. "Pearls before swine," he explains.

In episode 1.6, "Over the Hill", Hunt coerces Luigi to open the trattoria in pre-dawn hours in order that Hunt and Drake can hold a small, impromptu birthday party for eight-year-old murder witness, Donny Cale (Asa Butterfield). Like Drake, he lives in a flat above the restaurant and, after the food is served, tells Hunt to lock up so that he can go back upstairs to bed.

In the final act of episode 1.7, "Charity Begins at Home", Gil Hollis fires several shots into Luigi's restaurant from in front of the police station, leading a determined Hunt to declare that, "I am not dying in a trattoria!"

As of November 1982, Hunt has a substantial bar tab at Luigi's.

Luigi is notified by telephone in November 1983 that an unliked cousin has died and left him a significant inheritance, prompting Luigi to return to Italy.

==== Molly Drake ====
Molly Drake (born 1996) (Grace Vance) is the twelve-year-old daughter of Alex Drake and Peter Drake. She is named for Caroline Price's grandmother, a suffragette, and coincidentally shares her name with her father's childhood cat. Molly's father abandons her and her mother when Molly is six months old. Her mother commonly addresses her as "Molls" as her father called his cat. Her proper name and nickname are extraordinarily similar to the two nicknames by which her mother is normally addressed by Gene Hunt: "Bolly" and "Bolls". Like her mother, Molly is the goddaughter of Evan White who calls her "Scraps".

Her paternal grandfather, Bryan Drake, paints her portrait for Alex.

Her voice is first heard reading from Sam Tyler's file in the opening scene of episode 1.1, "Deja Vu", while her mother drives her to school through central London; the notes she reads are the same post-coma statement Sam narrates at the start of episodes 1.2-2.8 of Life on Mars, and lead her to scoff, "Whatever. That is so lame!" She is celebrating her twelfth birthday in 2008 when the series begins; Evan has given her a BlackBerry as a present and is getting her a "seriously chocolatey" cake; her father Peter is travelling in Canada with a woman named Judy and is not believed to have sent her a birthday present. That morning, she relishes the chance to place the flashing blue emergency light on her mother's car herself in order to go "blues and twos". Molly is briefly held at gunpoint by Arthur Layton when she defies Alex's instructions to remain in the car. After the hostage situation, Alex tells her, "It's a hard, screwed-up world but, if you trust me, I will try to help you get through it." Alex then leaves her in the care of Evan while Alex attends to reports, promising to be at Molly's birthday party in time to blow out the candles on her cake together. Unbeknownst to Molly, Alex is abducted by Layton moments later.

Late that night, Molly travels to the hospital where Alex is taken for surgery after being discovered with Layton's gunshot wound to her head.

After Alex is sent back in time, Molly acts as something akin to the Test Card Girl of Life on Mars, frequently appearing to Alex as hallucinations at points throughout the series. Alex cannot observe Molly directly, but either senses her presence in the room or sees her in reflections and in her peripheral vision; Molly vanishes whenever Alex turns to look directly at her. The Clown Angel of Death (Molly's maternal grandfather) occasionally speaks to Alex in Molly's voice in the first series. At the end of episode 1.1, "Deja Vu", the Molly-voiced clown tells her, "You've just been shot, a second ago. You are lying on the wet ground. Don't fight to wake up; it will hurt too much. You'll never make it to her party. All those memories, but it doesn't have to hurt."

Alex directs many of her audiotaped progress notes toward Molly and frequently talks to her. Getting back to Molly, especially before the birthday party, is Alex's overarching goal. Her line to Molly about the state of the world and trust, is repeated verbatim back to her by DCI Gene Hunt after the 1981 climax scene of episode 1.1, "Deja Vu".

The exception to Alex's inability to look straight at Molly is when Molly appears as if cast in 1980s television programmes. Molly looks for her mother while interacting with Zippy and George in episode of Rainbow set in the Fenchurch East CID office. Molly later appears in a 1982 episode of Grange Hill in which she is questioned about her mother by head teacher Bridget McClusky. Molly Drake appears in a 1982 episode of Angels where she is told by a woman off-camera that Alex will not wake up for a very long while. Alex later hears her (through Luigi's radio) being told that Alex is "doing really well," and that "the operation was a complete success;" they need only wait for her to wake up.

A moment after Alex awakens from her coma in 2008, an overjoyed Molly is brought to her bedside for a brief visit. As Molly exits to give her mother some rest, she and the draped corpse of Martin Summers cross paths in the corridor. In a reversal, once Molly is away, Gene Hunt appears to Alex on the video screens; albeit on hospital diagnostic monitors, whereas Molly would appear on Alex's 1980s television in Hunt's absence.

When Alex dies and Gene Hunt slaps her "awake" into the Geneverse purgatory in the season 3 première, Molly's jacket is on the chair in Alex's hospital or hospice room. In the finale, Molly appears in a dream, supporting her mother in an It's a Knockout style game, against Gene Hunt, both Alex and Gene are foam rubber suit versions of themselves. Molly repeatedly shouts to her mother to "Get up!" because "He's coming!"

==== Arthur Layton ====
Arthur Layton (Sean Harris) is a criminal with a talent for using explosives. He is uncomfortable with people staring at him and wears mirrored sunglasses to hide his eyes. It is his gunshot which sends the programme's protagonist, Alex Drake, back in time from 2008 to 1981.

On the same morning as her arrival in the past, 7 July 1981, DI Alex Drake notices Layton's name on the side of a Betamax video cassette on a shelf in the Fenchurch East police station's electronics storage room. To DCI Gene Hunt, he is merely a tinker with a minor record whom Hunt tolerates in exchange for periodic information. Drake, however, is certain that his surveillance tape would not be there if Layton were not crucial. In the surveillance tape, he wears a t-shirt depicting the cover of David Bowie's Scary Monsters (And Super Creeps) album which includes the song, "Ashes to Ashes".

Layton's criminal record includes convictions for fencing stolen property through his junk business in Shadwell, but Drake believes him to be the kingpin behind a drugs smuggling operation in the city. Drake and DC Chris Skelton pay him a visit and Drake orders him arrested for no apparent reason. He is unintimidated by Drake's interrogation, denying all involvement in the drugs trade, and is quickly released by Hunt. While in custody, his subordinate, Edward Markham, attempts to shut down their supply line through a series of nine payphone calls and a message picked up on Charterhouse Lane near Tower Bridge.

Drake visits his junk shop again and leaves with his encoded notebook. Hunt takes the notebook from a drunken Drake that evening and shows it to DS Ray Carling who doesn't know what to make of the numbers. Drake's attempt to link Markham and Layton results in the kidnapping of WPC Shaz Granger, but succeeds in linking the two men, as the car in which Markham takes Granger is found to be registered to Layton. Also found to be registered to Layton are boats including The Prince Charlie. That revelation causes Hunt to realise that the numeric code in Layton's notebook are tide times for shipping the drugs.

CID find Markham, Layton, their gang, and Granger at a large drugs deal at the docks near Tower Bridge, and Drake admonishes her team that she needs Layton alive. He takes Granger hostage at gunpoint during the ensuing gunfight and is pursued by Drake. In his 1981 stand-off with Drake, Layton holds Granger in the same manner that he will hold the woman hostage in 2008 when Alex similarly approaches him. In 1981, however, Drake is armed and aiming at his head. The stand-off is broken by Hunt who arrives via a commandeered speedboat with Carling and Skelton, allowing Granger to escape. Drake arrests him for, not only drug trafficking and abduction, but additionally for shooting her in the head which he will not do for twenty-seven years. Hunt sprays Layton's direction with an Uzi, only wounding him superficially. Despite Drake's wishful thinking, Layton's arrest does not result in her return to 2008.

Layton is later released from jail near the end of episode 1.8, "Alex's Big Day" through the efforts of his barristers, Tim Price and Evan White and is commissioned by Tim Price to install a suicide bomb in White's car which Tim borrows under the pretext of driving Caroline and young Alex Price to the train station. Layton wires the bomb trigger to the car's cassette tape player. While riding in the back seat, young Alex sees Layton walking down the road as they pass him. He watches from the hillside as the bomb detonates, killing Tim and Caroline, but sparing young Alex who had alighted the stopped car to fetch her balloon which had escaped through the window. In the excitement, his presence is apparently unnoticed by Hunt and adult Alex Drake, as neither rushes to arrest him on suspicion of murder.

On several occasions in 1981 and 2008, he quotes the lyric "I'm happy, hope you're happy too" from David Bowie's song, Ashes to Ashes. The song plays on the car's cassette player leading up to the bomb's detonation.

In 2008, Layton is down-and-out, still bearing the scar on his left cheek from Hunt's 9mm Uzi round twenty-seven years earlier, his crime empire merely a memory. One morning, he takes a woman hostage on the embankment in front of the Tate Modern, and demands to speak specifically with DI Alex Drake, causing Drake to detour on her way to delivering her daughter Molly Drake to school her twelfth birthday.

He holds the hostage in the same manner has he held Granger twenty-seven years earlier. When Alex manages to cause Layton to release his civilian hostage in favour of herself, Molly defies Alex's instruction to remain in the car and approaches through the crowd of observers. Although Layton's name and aged face mean nothing to Drake, he tells her, "I knew you when you were a little girl. You've got your mother's eyes, Alex," and proceeds to twice taunt her with the lyrics "I'm happy; hope you're happy too," from David Bowie's 1980 hit single "Ashes to Ashes" before cocking his revolver's hammer and saying, "Boom!" This prompts a frightened Molly to rush past the barricade tape toward her mother, whereupon Layton takes Molly hostage instead and leads her down the steps toward the river's edge, threatening to kill her if followed. Drake puts herself in between the police sharpshooters and Layton & Molly, whilst repeatedly screaming "Hold your fire!" to the former. When Layton fires, Drake rushes down the steps, to find Molly unharmed and Layton gone.

Later, at approximately 10:00 that morning, after Alex has sent Molly home with her godfather, Alex gets into her car, still parked on the south bank, without noticing Layton sitting in wait for her in the back seat. With his revolver to her head, he directs her to drive to an old, apparently abandoned barge on the north bank, opposite The O_{2}. Walking swiftly to the barge, he claims that she will be his "ticket out of this mess," before placing a call on his mobile phone and telling the other party, "You're gonna [sic] have to listen, 'cause I've got a piece of your past standing [sic] right here in front of me: Tim and Caroline Price's daughter; and I'm gonna [sic] tell her the truth why her parents died." The party whom Layton telephones in 2008 is not yet revealed conclusively. At the end of episode 1.8, "Alex's Big Day", adult Alex Drake opines in 1981 that Evan White is whom Layton calls, telling Hunt that "I'm the piece of his [Evan's] past, or I will be. He'll be blackmailed by Layton for not telling the truth."

Once in the barge, Layton laments his lost success, telling Alex, "I had an empire back in the day. I had connections; I had dealers on every street corner." Alex uses her psychological training and experience in an attempt to calm Layton and save her own life. Her attempt fails, and Layton decides not to reveal the truth about her parents' death before shooting her in the head. In the instant Layton's bullet impacts her, Alex sees a series of disconnected images, which include Layton shooting her instant before, and a childhood memory of seeing Layton as a young man walking beside the road as she rides past him.

BBC News soon report Drake's disappearance and the police's suspicion of Layton's culpability; Layton is described as "dangerous and armed". A poster seen in Series 2, Episode 8, states that Layton is still at large in 2008. While the precise amount of time that has elapsed while Alex is in hospital is not stated, the statements by Molly and medical personnel which Alex hears during her surgery, infection, and treatment of her infection suggest that a scant few days have passed since Layton's abduction and shooting of her on Molly's birthday.

== Life on Mars supporting characters ==
=== 1973 characters ===
- Ted Bannister (John Henshaw) appeared in episode three as a trade union organiser who is fighting to keep the factory where he works in business, despite its probable closure. The character is introduced when a corpse is found in the factory and the death is assumed to be murder. Later it transpires that the dead man was killed by faulty machinery, and Ted concealed the circumstances of the death to prop up the factory's reputation. Later in the episode, Ted's son Derek (Andrew Knott) is arrested for armed robbery, after organising a payroll snatch at the factory.
- Pete Bond (Anthony Flanagan) is a Manchester United supporter and a regular at the Trafford Arms. He tried to beat up Colin Clay, a fellow supporter, and blame it on Manchester City fans to start a massive brawl between the two sides fans on derby day. Unfortunately, Colin accidentally died, forcing Sam to track Pete down and arrest him.
- WPC Phyllis Dobbs (Noreen Kershaw) is the station desk/custody officer, supervising the cells and mentoring WPC Annie Cartwright, with whom she forms a friendship. Phyllis is regarded by other characters as "one of the lads" and socialises with them in the pub after work which is the "male domain". In a time of social upheaval and women being treated as inferiors to men, Phyllis's no-nonsense attitude earns respect with the male fraternity because they know that, whatever rank they are, she won't tolerate their disrespect. She encourages Sam to act on his feelings toward Annie.
- Richard "Dickie Fingers" Hands (Steve Evets) appeared in episode two of the second series and is introduced when Chris, Ray and Sam are sent to escort him from prison back to Manchester for questioning. During the transfer they are forced off of the road and held at gunpoint while the gunmen kidnap Dickie. It later transpires that the rescue was organised by corrupt police officer Harry Woolf.
- Terry Haslam is a boxing manager who has a history with Gene Hunt. He beat up retired boxer Davie Mackie and blackmailed Hunt not to report it. However, Hunt did report it and took Haslam. Haslam was found innocent and Gene threatened to kill him. The next day Haslam is found dead and it is revealed that he had bet on Davie Mackie's last boxing match, telling Davie to throw the fight. Davie resisted, killing Haslam.
- Leslie Johns (Sean Gilder) is a miner and an infamous cop killer. He organises the robbery of a train with a group of miners unaware Gene is undercover as one of the miners. The robbery seems to be going smoothly (Johns is unaware the train's staff are members of CID) but then Sam's radio goes off giving them up as police officers. When Annie, Chris, Ray and Gene run after Sam, Johns shoots Gene, Chris and Ray causing them to fall to the floor. When Sam returns from 2006 he shoots Johns dead as he is about to execute Gene.
- Billy Kemble (Kevin Knapman) is arrested during episode seven for flashing his genitals in public and is investigated on suspected drug dealing. While in police custody, DS Ray Carling, assisted by DC Chris Skelton, force Kemble to eat cocaine, in the hope Kemble would reveal his supplier. Kemble has a heart attack, and dies in police custody. DCI Gene Hunt covers up the death to save all concerned from certain dismissal, but temporarily demotes Carling to Detective Constable, stating that the incident was "shameful" and that it was never to be repeated.
- Detective Chief Inspector Derek Litton, QPM (Lee Ross), is the Detective Chief Inspector (DCI) of the Regional Crime Squad. He and DCI Gene Hunt have a long-standing rivalry that festers into hatred of each other. The two departments fight after Gene and Detective Inspector Sam Tyler recover firearms stolen by factory workers, a job that falls under Litton's department. Later, in a hostage situation, Litton and Gene must work together to stop the hostages being killed. However, Litton's methods threaten Sam's and his own life, when Gene kicks him in the stomach and drops him out of the fire zone, proceeding to take a bullet which was blocked by one of his many hip flasks. Litton returns in Ashes to Ashes along with DI Geoffrey "Geoff" Bevan (Nicholas Gleaves), hunting comedian Frank Hardwicke (Roy Hudd) on suspicion of having robbed a police widows' benefit fund (in reality, Hardwicke had witnessed Bevan killing a young black man). Litton was awarded the Queen's Police Medal (distinguished service) some time in the intervening decade, flaunting it to Gene's detectives in Ashes to Ashes.
- Frank Miller (Peter Wight) appears in episode three of the second series as an owner of a local building site. It later transpires that he planted bombs around Manchester, thought to be placed by the Irish Republican Army, to distract the police while he broke into a bank.
- Arnold Malone (Stephen Bent) is a longtime rival of Superintendent Harry Woolf. According to Woolf, Malone was responsible for a large amount of the crime rate in Manchester from the 1950s to the period of the show. Woolf tries to frame Malone for the robberies Woolf has been committing but the evidence leads DI Sam Tyler, DCI Gene Hunt, and DC Glenn Fletcher to arrest Woolf.
- Nelson (Tony Marshall) is the barman at the Railways Arms where most of CID go to drink. Nelson gives much advice to Sam during his time in 1973, typically with double-meanings that seem to apply to both an issue at hand in 1973, and to Sam's overarching problem of being trapped in a dystopic 1973. He usually affects a thick Jamaican accent, although Nelson is actually from Manchester (like Marshall), and uses the accent because his customers seem to like him better as a foreigner than as a black local. In the final year of the sequel series, Ashes to Ashes, Nelson's ghostly voice can be heard briefly in 1983 to DI Ray Carling, DC Chris Skelton and WPC Shaz Granger; Ray cannot quite place the voice, and Shaz never knew Nelson, but Chris recognises it and tells the other two. In the final act of the finale, after the characters have learned that they are dead souls in a CID purgatory, Nelson appears with a mystical version of the Railway Arms, suddenly in London. Still affecting the accent, he is an Odin or Saint Peter type figure who welcomes Ray, Chris, Shaz, and finally DI Alex Drake into a sort of policemen's Valhala or heaven: an eternal pub. Nelson has two counterparts in the American remake: a rarely seen bartender named Nelson (Mike Starr), and Sam's hippy (and possibly imaginary) neighbour, Windy (Tanya Fischer) who provides double-meaning insight to Sam.
- Joni Newton (Kelly Wenham) worked for local gangster Stephen Warren. She was a "honey trap" for Sam when he tried to go against Warren and take her into his care after purporting that she was going to be killed by him, where whilst she was in Sam's care she spiked his drink with LSD and engaged in sex with him. She ended up going against Warren but was killed and her body was found on the canal.
- Patrick O'Brien (Brendan Mackey) is an Irishman with a criminal record who was arrested by Gene for armed robbery. When dynamite goes missing at O'Brien's workplace he becomes the prime suspect in a spate of suspected IRA bombings. Gene is prejudiced against him because he is an ex-convict. This and his desire to avenge Ray cause Patrick to go on the run. Sam finds O'Brien and tells him he will find out who is really behind the bombs.
- Superintendent Frank Rathbone (William Hoyland) is the senior officer in overall command of both CID and uniform within the station. During episode 7 of the first series, DI Sam Tyler gives him a tape recording, proving that DS Ray Carling forced a prisoner to eat cocaine while in custody in the hope that it would get results out of him. Rathbone carelessly destroys the tape in front of Tyler without even bothering to hear its contents, satisfied that CID dealt with the matter internally and that there is no need for it to be taken further. Tyler feels let down by the corrupt Rathbone but accepts there is nothing else he can do.
- Donald Sykes (Jack Deam) appears in episode eight of the second series, as a local criminal who is involved in a plot to rob a train with Leslie Johns. Sykes only gives up the plot after DCI Gene Hunt and DS Ray Carling savagely beat him up in the interrogation room.
- The Test Card Girl (Rafaella Hutchinson in series one and Harriet Rogers in series two) is a young girl resembling the girl (Carole Hersee) in Test Card F, who appears as a vision to DI Sam Tyler. She often tells him things related to his current life, taunts Sam, and occasionally scares him greatly. For example, when he struggles with the stress of a failed bomb disposal, she appears to him showing her closed fists and chants "Red wire. Yellow wire. Red Wire. Yellow wire." When he fails to pick the correct hand she calmly says: "You're dead Sam. They're all dead because of you." At the series finale, she is seen running down a street with other children: Turning to camera, she reaches to switch off the TV, and the image disappears as in an old television set. In an interview with the Radio Times, Matthew Graham revealed the Test Card girl is constantly teasing and torturing Sam because she represents the devil in him. "But," he said, "there is another factor to consider. In 1973, when television transmission ceased for the night, when the story is done and the characters have vanished into nothing, the BBC would switch to the Test Card girl. So she, if you want to be melodramatic, represents the apocalypse, the end." She has two counterparts in the sequel programme, Ashes to Ashes. To the extent that she represents the devil and shuts off the Geneverse world, she foreshadows final series regular, DCI Jim Keats, a demon who obliterates the meticulously created Geneverse purgatory's façade, reveals the characters' prior deaths, and tempts them to come to hell. As a spectre who haunts the central protagonist, she and her clown doll, Bubbles, are akin to first series character the Clown Angel of Death who appears to terrorise DI Alex Drake and once frightens dying WPC Sharon Granger. She has no direct counterpart in the American remake.
- Victor "Vic" Tyler (Lee Ingleby) is the father of Sam Tyler. Sam becomes convinced if he gets his father to stay with his mother then he can get back to 2006. However, he finds his father, masquerading as "The Morton Brothers", is behind some brutal gangland killings. Adult Sam discovers to his horror the fleeting image he has throughout series 1, of a woman running in the woods in a red dress, is his memory of WPC Annie Cartwright chasing Vic at a family wedding and being brutally beaten by Vic. Adult Sam saves Annie from Vic but allows Vic to escape to protect his younger self from growing up the son of an imprisoned murderer. His counterpart in the American remake is Vic Tyler, portrayed by Dean Winters.
- Stephen Warren (Tom Mannion) is a local gangster and owner of a nightclub, The Warren, who is paying the police, including Hunt, to turn a blind eye to his activities. He advises Sam Tyler not to go against him and implies that others have tried unsuccessfully; "others have tried to wear the white hat, and all have failed." After he murders one of his staff who helped out Sam, Gene Hunt decides to turn his back on corruption, and he and Sam come into his club and arrest him for murder. His American counterpart is Elliott Casso, portrayed by Robert Klein.
- Detective Superintendent Harcourt "Harry" Woolf (Kevin McNally) is the most senior officer at the station. He was also Gene Hunt's DCI when Gene Hunt was a DI and sees a lot of Gene in DI Sam Tyler, respecting Sam's policing methods. Woolf advises Gene to go by the book during the murder of George Rills in series 2, episode 1. Woolf is later revealed to be heavily corrupt, having masterminded a bank robbery to gain enough money to live out his last years before he dies of terminal cancer. Woolf planned to frame local gangster Arnold Malone for the robbery and had Dickie Fingers sprung from police escort for it. After Dickie reveals the truth about him to Tyler, Woolf releases him from his cell and has him executed. Despite Gene's loyalty to Woolf, he sees his corruption for what it is and attempts to arrest him. During the stand-off, Woolf is shot in the leg by Hunt and is subsequently held prisoner by an angry, betrayed DC Glenn Fletcher. Woolf loses everything, but Gene assures Sam that he won't let his old mentor die penniless and alone. One of Lt. Gene Hunt's sporadically seen superiors in the American version is Chief of Detectives Harry Woolf (Fred Thompson); unlike in the original, Chief Woolf is not shown to be corrupt.

=== 2006 characters ===
- Detective Constable Maya Roy (Archie Panjabi), born in early 1974 in Manchester to Englishwoman Leslie Roy (alias Layla Dylan) and the late Deepak Gandhi, an Ugandan Asian immigrant, is Sam's girlfriend in 2006. She is abducted by the suspect they are hunting at the beginning of the first episode; Sam is attempting to find her when he is struck by a car and transported back to 1973. She escapes unharmed whilst he is comatose in 2006 and trapped in 1973. Their relationship is already having difficulties before Sam's accident, and Maya ends it during the second series when it appears Sam will never recover. In the same episode, adult Sam meets Maya's pregnant mother Leslie, in 1973 and, in a predestination paradox, inspires her to name her baby Maya. Maya is, accordingly, approximately 4.5 years younger than Sam who is four in 1973. Her counterpart in the US remake is Detective Maya Daniels, portrayed by Lisa Bonet.

=== 2006 and 1973 characters ===
- Tony Crane (Marc Warren) was arrested by Sam in 2006 for the murder of his wife Eve. He manages to get to Sam's hospital room and attempts to kill him, but is arrested before he can do so. In 1973, Crane runs a local casino and is Sam's prime suspect for the killing of a man on a bus. Gene doesn't believe Sam until Crane takes them both hostage. He is arrested after Annie uses a stinger ("invented" in 1973 by Sam, from his familiarity with them in the future) on his car in a chase, but there is not enough evidence to charge him. However, when Crane starts to make accusations of Sam's instability, citing the policeman's belief that he is a time traveller, Sam turns the tables by using this as proof of Crane's insanity. As a result, Crane is committed to a psychiatric hospital, where he remains for the next 33 years. His American counterpart is Tony Crane, portrayed by Chris Bowers. Sam arrested him for murdering his wife, Penny Margolise, in 2008 and Sam quickly suspected him of murdering a news reporter who had visited his gallery in 1973.
- DC/Supt/DCC Glenn Fletcher (Ray Emmet Brown) appears in episode two of the second series as a Detective Constable in 1973 and, in momentary flashes forward, as a Deputy Chief Constable in 2006. He was one of the Manchester and Salford Police's first black recruits at the start of the 1970s. In 1973, at only nineteen years of age, he is newly transferred to C Division CID as a detective constable. As the first black officer in the division, he experiences racist jokes and bullying from DS Ray Carling, to which Fletcher responds by agreeing with and making light of the racism. Sam encourages young DC Fletcher to assert himself and fight the racism which he's been tolerating. In the intervening years, Fletcher rises through the ranks in Hyde. He becomes Sam Tyler's superintendent and mentor, and is the senior officer who has Sam promoted to Detective Chief Inspector. His 2006 self is shown wearing the ribbons of both the Queen Elizabeth II Golden Jubilee Medal and the Police Long Service and Good Conduct Medal. The first black person to hold the rank of Deputy Chief Constable in the Greater Manchester Police, he dies suddenly of a heart attack at his Chorlton home in 2006 at the age of 52, while Sam is in a coma. The character is based on 1970s comic Charlie Williams. His counterpart in the American remake is Detective/Captain Fletcher Bellow (Edi Gathegi).
- DCI/Surgeon Frank Morgan (Ralph Brown) is a dual character, existing both in Sam's 2006 reality and his 1973 coma world. Sam first sees him, as yet unidentified, in a momentary flash in episode 2.5. His two selves are introduced in episode 2.7 and appear in episode 2.8. Sam is aware of both characters, and interprets the 1973 DCI Morgan to be an avatar of the 2006 surgeon Morgan. Many of DCI Morgan's statements to Sam are ambiguous, potentially referring to both Sam's 2006 medical condition and the 1973 police work. The duality of Morgan's character is reminiscent of the 1939 MGM production of The Wizard of Oz. Frank Morgan was the name of the actor who played both Professor Marvel and the Wizard in that production, and Life on Mars included frequent allusions to the film. Sam hears surgeon Frank Morgan explain that he is a specialist who has been called in to treat Sam's condition and bring him out of the coma; he tells Sam that the latter must fight to get back.
  DCI Morgan subsequently arrives from C Division, Hyde, taking acting command of A Division, Manchester, when DCI Gene Hunt is suspended during the proceedings resulting from Hunt being accused of murdering a man. Sam is impressed by DCI Morgan's modern, by-the-book, nature. Unlike Hunt and the others in 1973, Morgan records his interrogations. The manner in which he lays out his pens, notepad, inter alia, at the start of his interrogation of Gene echos Sam's actions in 2006 in episode 1.1. Morgan intends to remove Gene and modernise A Division. When Sam and Gene prove the latter's innocence, Morgan brings a bottle of liquor to CID's celebration and offers a "no hard feelings" truce which Gene accepts. In private, however, he tells Sam that bringing down Hunt will get Sam home (ostensibly back to Hyde; implicitly back to 2006). Morgan tells Sam that the latter is suffering amnesia from his injuries in ep. 1.1, is really named Sam Williams, and is undercover to expose the corruption of Gene Hunt and his team in "Operation MARS". Likening Sam's condition to a "waking coma" that Sam supposedly had after a coach crash in 1950 at the age of 12. Morgan shows Sam the cemetery where his (Williams') parents are buried, adjacent to the 19th-century graves of Vic, Ruth, and Sam Tyler. Sam tells Morgan about Gene's dangerous sting operation to catch train robbers in the act. Morgan instructs Sam to play along, ensuring him that a detachment of armed response officers will be in the railway tunnel to foil the robbery, protect Sam and his colleagues, and relieve Gene of duty permanently. When Sam runs into the tunnel during the robbery, however, Morgan informs him that there will be no armed response and he is cleaning house by letting Gene, DS Ray Carling, and DCs Chris Skelton and Annie Cartwright be killed. He leads Sam into oblivion, assuring him that he is going home. When Sam awakens in his 2006 hospital bed an instant later, he finds Mr Frank Morgan, surgeon, greeting him. Surgeon Morgan has operated on Sam to bring him out of his coma. Sam's hospital room is in Hyde Ward. In the US version, Frank Morgan is an FBI agent sent to the 125th Detective Squad to investigate an Irish gangster's murder and tries to frame Det. Sam Tyler, but Sam finds out that he murdered the gangster because he hijacked a truck of smuggled goods that Morgan had owned and is arrested by Lt. Gene Hunt.
- Eve Olawi (Yasmin Bannerman) was killed by Tony Crane prior to Sam's coma. She dismisses his warnings in 1973 that she will have a terrible life with Crane.
- Colin Raimes (Sam Hazeldine) is a suspected killer in 2006. Sam is convinced Colin was behind the 2006 crime but despite having written about killing in his diary, Raimes has a cast iron alibi. Maya suggests he might have known the killer. In 1973, Sam discovers that the true murderer in 2006 was Colin's neighbour, who was arrested in 1973 for a similar crime but released thirty years later. His American counterpart shares the same name.
- Leslie Roy (Alex Reid) is the bookkeeper and girlfriend of Deepak Gandhi. She has recently fallen pregnant with his child when he is killed in the summer of 1973. She identifies herself by the alias Layla Dylan when first questioned by the police. Investigating the crime is DI Sam Tyler who, unlike their contemporaries, does not look down upon Leslie's relationship with an Ugandan Asian immigrant, as he had loved the daughter of one himself. With Deepak dead, Leslie intends to abort their child but is talked out of doing so by Sam who, in a predestination paradox, inspires her to name her baby Maya. In 2006 (unseen), Leslie does not particularly approve of her daughter's boyfriend and supervisor, DCI Sam Tyler. She would prefer that Maya would marry a physician or wealthy man rather than a police officer.
- Ruth Tyler (Joanne Froggatt in 1973 & Judi Jones in 2006) is the mother of Sam Tyler. Sam meets her whilst in 1973, incognito, improvising the name "Detective Inspector Bolan" when asked his name – he had spoken with musician Marc Bolan the previous evening. He meets her again when the CID deduces his father Vic might be involved with the Morton brothers. In "Episode 1", when the truth about Vic's involvement in violent crime is discovered, Ruth tells the four-year-old Sammy that Vic had to go away. Sam also speaks to Ruth when he returns to 2006, leaving Hunt and his team in 1973 in a mail train under fire from railway bandits. Without telling her the details, he says he promised someone he would return. She tells him she knows he won't let them down, because he always keeps his promises. This clears the way for his return to 1973. Ruth is not mentioned in Ashes to Ashes. In some respects, Caroline Price (Amelia Bullmore) is an analogous character. Series protagonist DI Alex Drake reunites with her mother, Caroline, and visits her childhood home, as Sam had done. Caroline provides Alex advice on occasion. Like Ruth, Caroline is unaware that she is married to a murderer. Her counterpart in the American remake is Rose Tyler, portrayed by Jennifer Ferrin, and appears only in the 1973 world. The change of forename brought the Tyler surname full-circle. Series creator Matthew Graham's young daughter had given Sam the surname Tyler in homage to the companion on the newly re-launched Doctor Who, Rose Tyler.

== Ashes to Ashes supporting characters ==
=== 1980s characters ===
- Nina Akaboa (Nicole Charles) appears in episode three of the first series as a prostitute who has been raped aboard Leonard Roseberry-Sykes luxury yacht. As Nina is afraid to report the crime, her sex-worker colleague Trixie Walsh reports the rape claiming it to be against herself rather than Nina. While in Fenchurch East Police Station for an unrelated matter, Nina eventually reveals to DS Ray Carling that it is her who was raped by Ryan Burns, a waiter working on the yacht.
- Detective Inspector Geoffrey "Geoff" Bevan (Nicholas Gleaves) is a corrupt Manchester Criminal Investigation Department (CID) copper who comes to London with Detective Chief Inspector (DCI) Derek Litton to hunt Frank Hardwicke, the comedian who saw DI Bevan kill a young black man in cold blood. Bevan is eventually shot as he flees the gala, and as he is dying Gene tells him the truth about the world he is in.
- Bill (Bill Moody) appears in episode six of the second series as an owner of a scrap-yard who attends a neighbourhood watch meeting set up by Stanley Mitchell. While at the meeting, he reveals to DCI Gene Hunt and DI Alex Drake that he has been beaten and run over by local crime-lord, Trevor Riley's men. After DCI Hunt is attacked by Riley's men in the process of an investigation, Hunt restrains Riley and takes him to Bill's scrap yard and destroys a car with Riley inside it as a form of interrogation
- David Bonds (Christopher Fairbank) appears in episode two of the first series as the owner of a public house on the Isle of Dogs. David, his wife Elaine and son George refuse to move from the premises despite the compulsory purchase order as part of the Docklands Development.
- Elaine Bonds (Amelda Brown) appears in episode two of the first series as the wife of the above character, David Bonds and the mother of the character below, her son George.
- George Bonds (Stephen Wight) appears in episode two of the first series as the son of the two above characters. It later transpires that his father and George plotted to kill Danny Moore, with George eventually detonating a suicide bomb amidst a street party celebrating the Royal Wedding.
- Ryan Burns (Leo Bill) appears in episode three of the first series as a rapist and murderer committed out of religious extremism. After killing Delfine Parks, he goes on to rape Nina Akaboa aboard Leonard Roseberry-Sykes' yacht, Sunborn where he works as a waiter. While attempting to rape and murder a third prostitute, the CID team arrive and arrest Burns. Now knowing that Trixie Walsh reported Nina's rape as if it were against herself and that Nina is too scared to testify, Burns would fail to be convicted. Due to this, DS Ray Carling plants cocaine-filled garden gnomes in Burns' car, leading to him being imprisoned for drugs offences.
- Micky Dillon (Neal Barry) appears in episode five of the second series as a local burglar. He was a member of George Staines' gang during the 1970s. He is the prime suspect of burglaries in the area, and was initially suspected to have burgled the house of DI Alex Drake's future husband's parents, Bryan and Marjorie Drake.
- Bryan Drake (Rory MacGregor) is the husband of Marjorie Drake and the father of Peter Drake. They reside in a house at number 2 Stanley Road. Having never trusted banks, he keeps his wages at home. On the morning of 8 November 1982, he and his family are robbed by a burglar who wears a mask of Prime Minister Margaret Thatcher to conceal his identity as George Staines (or, as he is known to the Drakes, their friend Gaynor Mason). Bryan struggles to defend his family but is shoved by Staines/Mason and strikes his right temple on the table edge. The wound leaves him deaf for the rest of his life. He is visited in hospital that day by his future daughter-in-law, DI Alex Drake. After looking to see that the nurses are out of earshot, Alex talks candidly to him about the future, knowing that he cannot hear her. She acknowledges that she has finally learned that she cannot change the events in her past. [The conversation takes place thirteen months after she failed to prevent her own parents' deaths.] In coping with his deafness, Bryan takes up painting which he tells his daughter-in-law is the best thing he ever did. He paints a picture of his grand-daughter, Molly which he gives to Molly's mother, Alex. After Bryan's son, Peter, abandons Alex and six-month-old Molly, Bryan is the one person who makes Alex believe that it is not the end of her life and career. Alex's use of past-tense and general delivery when speaking to Bryan in hospital suggest that he dies prior to 2008.
- Marjorie Drake (Sophie Stanton) is the wife of Bryan Drake and the mother of Peter Drake. They reside in a house at number 2 Stanley Road. On the morning of 8 November 1982, she and her family are robbed by a burglar who wears a mask of Prime Minister Margaret Thatcher to conceal his identity as George Staines (or, as he is known to the Drakes, their friend Gaynor Mason). Staines/Mason steals approximately £1.000 and some jewellery, including the necklace she was wearing. Marjorie is confused by the familiarity and sympathy with which she is treated by DI Alex Drake who is, unknown to her, her future ex-daughter-in-law; DCI Gene Hunt explains that DI Drake "takes her community relations very seriously." In 1996, Marjorie becomes a grandmother with the birth of Peter's daughter, Molly.
- DC Louise Gardiner (Zoe Telford) is an undercover officer from a nearby police station who infiltrates a gang of ruthless criminals, the Staffords, under the name Sarah Huddersfield. The gang is run by Terry (Peter Guinness) and Daniel Stafford (Bryan Dick) who are a father and son team who seem to be moving from robbery and other violent crimes into major drug dealing. Gardiner is in place just before the son is released from prison with her mission to help bring down the gang. Gardiner's superior, DCI Wilson, has a grudge against the father after he was run over by an Austin Allegro during an attempt to stop a bank robbery and appears to have left Gardiner in place with little backup and disregard to her needs for protection during her undercover mission.
- Gnome Thief (Callum Dixon) is the misnomer by which an otherwise unidentified drugs courier is referred to in the credits. He and his cohort have cocaine hidden inside of garden gnomes which they attempt to throw into the river when caught by DCI Gene Hunt and his CID team.
- Gil Hollis (Matthew Macfadyen, husband of series star, Keeley Hawes) is a charity fund-raiser who has obsessive-compulsive disorder. Hollis claims to have had all the charity money stolen in a robbery in episode 1.7, "Charity Begins at Home". DCI Gene Hunt and DI Alex Drake figure out that he staged the robbery himself after Hunt realises that Hollis' assailants would have had to drive past the hooligans who saw no second car and notices the blood smears under the suction cups of Hollis' window Garfield, and Drake recognises the scent of portable toilet chemicals on Hollis' blood-stained shirt. At the end of the episode, Hollis fires several rounds into Luigi's wine bar where the CID are drinking, prompting an angry Hunt to declare that, "I am not dying in a trattoria!". Hollis explains the staged robbery as a plan to win back his wife and children who had left him for putting starving Africans ahead of his own family's welfare. Unarmed WPC Sharon "Shaz" Granger gives chase when Hollis takes flight. With his pocketknife, Hollis retrieves the rolled notes he had hidden in the ends of pipes and throws it all away. When Shaz arrests him, she falls on his knife, resulting in clinical death. Hunt and DC Chris Skelton are particularly enraged; Hunt orders the handcuffed Hollis to his knees and allows Chris to brutally beat him up. DS Ray Carling and Hunt himself join in the retaliatory attack on the "cop killer", ignoring Sergeant Viv James's calls for restraint. They stop only when Alex's CPR efforts revive Shaz at the last minute.
- Detective Chief Inspector Derek Litton, QPM (Lee Ross) is the Detective Chief Inspector (DCI) of the Regional Crime Squad. He and DCI Gene Hunt have a long-standing rivalry, the reason for which is unknown. The two departments fight after Gene and Detective Inspector Sam Tyler recover firearms stolen by factory workers, a job that falls under Litton's department. Later in a hostage situation Litton and Gene both have to work together to stop the hostages being killed. However, Litton's methods threaten Sam's and his own life, when Gene kicks him in the stomach and drops him out of the fire zone, proceeding to take a bullet which was blocked by one of his many hip flasks. Litton returns in Ashes to Ashes along with DI Geoffrey "Geoff" Bevan (Nicholas Gleaves), hunting comedian Frank Hardwicke (Roy Hudd) on suspicion of having robbed a police widows' benefit fund (in reality, Hardwicke had witnessed Bevan killing a young black man). Litton was awarded the Queen's Police Medal (distinguished service) some time in the intervening decade, flaunting it to Gene's detectives in Ashes to Ashes.
- Detective Chief Superintendent Charlie "SuperMac" Mackintosh (Roger Allam) is Gene Hunt's superior. His first appearance is in episode 2.1. He knew details of murdered PC Sean Ervine who was apparently drawn in by Soho's many strip clubs. It was eventually revealed that Mackintosh was having an affair with Ervine's wife, Ruth. When DI Drake theorises that the initials SM in Ervine's hidden diary indicate a meeting with Mac, she breaks into his office to see if a corresponding entry is also in Mac's diary. Mac had erased the entry, but Alex is able to easily raise the impression with a pencil rub. Gene initially idolises Mackintosh who is one of the few people in the world Gene respects. At first he appears to be a benevolent character but it soon becomes clear that he is utterly corrupt and greedy. Mackintosh takes bribes but is careful not to spend the money overtly. Rather, he saves for his retirement by investing in art and property through a cover corporation run by the murderer and rapist Ralph Jarvis, who was Mackintosh's classmate in police training and whom Mackintosh cleared of murder in 1977. He sees Gene as a protégé and eventually compels him to join the Masonic lodge that he and Ray Carling belong to. It is ultimately revealed that Gene has grown to distrust Mackintosh, considering him "bent as a ten bob bit" and he only joined the Masons in order to unravel Mackintosh's plans. Furthermore he holds the Masons in disdain and is "sick to his stomach" to have joined them, having seen their corrupt methods. Mackintosh has let various criminals loose on the streets on account of them being Masons, something which Gene disapproves of. Mackintosh holds Alex in contempt but views her as a threat. He twice tells Hunt that Drake is 'poisoning' the team. When Hunt refuses to silence Drake after they question Jarvis, Mackintosh frames her for corruption and suspends her, pending criminal prosecution. Having sworn to bring down SuperMac, Gene and Alex target Jarvis' mansion in the country, finding Mac's pension of artwork and walking into his party of underage virgin girls. Confronting SuperMac with their information, Gene finally asks if he can live with himself knowing he protected Jarvis, playing on his superior's greatest weakness: Mac was once a good man. As Jarvis prepares to walk free, SuperMac draws his sidearm and kills his accomplice, before aiming at his own head. Even after Gene's intervention, he manages to shoot himself fatally in the chest. His last words are a warning to Gene of an oncoming threat called "Operation Rose". Despite his apparent death, Mackintosh is heard on the telephone to Hunt in the next episode, demanding better results from the department.
- Edward Markham (Adam James) is a banker in the City, and local playboy whom DCI Gene Hunt suspects of being behind the recent flood of drugs into London. He is first seen singing along with his Walkman at a party aboard The Lady Di on the morning of 20 July 1981 He manages to avoid the uniformed police officers raiding the party. Accusing Alex (whom he thinks is a prostitute) of calling the police, he angrily pulls her about and intimidates her until the flashy arrival of DCI Hunt, DS Ray Carling, and DC Chris Skelton in Hunt's Audi Quattro. Gene Hunt's first line in the series is directed to Markham whom he tells, "Today, my friend, your diary entry will read, 'Took a prozzie hostage and was shot by three armed bastards.'" Alex uses her hostage negotiating skills to convince him to surrender, lest he be shot by Hunt and his men. His head is twice slammed into the Quattro by Carling during the arrest. In custody, Carling confiscates Markham's Walkman and gives it to WPC Shaz Granger. Despite Hunt's certainty that Markham is a drugs kingpin, Drake immediately sees him for what he truly is: a low-level front-man for a real drugs lord, as he lacks the requisite inclination toward delegation. "Top flight crime lords," she explains to Hunt, "expect their minions to do their donkey work. They expend their energy only when it's absolutely necessary. Crime lords don't gloat at police stations, Gene. They don't spend money on expensive lawyers and then do all the talking themselves, and they are not out to impress Northern flatfoots like you." While his boss, Arthur Layton, is in custody, Markham attempts to shut down their supply line through a series of nine payphone calls and a message picked up on Charterhouse Lane near Tower Bridge. He is picked up again - now clad in a cliché 1980s ensemble of double-breasted pinstripe suit, blue shirt with white collar & cuffs, and yellow 'power tie' - and agrees to speak with Hunt ... alone. He is released shortly thereafter, having purportedly given Hunt the entire network. Drake sets a trap to prove Markham works for Layton. She has Skelton and Granger stake out the message drop, having planted an envelope for Markham to take to Layton. While Skelton goes to urinate, Markham captures Granger. After beating Skelton, Markham and his henchmen leave with Shaz as insurance that CID will not interfere. Drake's plan to connect Markham to Layton works, however, as the car in which Markham takes Granger is found to be registered to Layton. CID find Markham, Layton, their gang, and Granger at a large drugs deal at the docks near Tower Bridge. During the ensuing gunfight, Markham attempts to flee in Layton's Mercedes which Hunt immobilises with a well-placed shot to its radiator; whereupon, Markham fleas on foot. Having taken time to gather up several kilograms of cocaine, he is caught by Skelton. Markham's cocky attitude backfires when he taunts the armed Skelton about not being the sort of man who can pull a trigger; Skelton shoots him in the foot.
- Gaynor Mason (born George Staines on 13 February 1949) (Sara Stewart) is a pre-operative transsexual. As a boy, Staines hates school, never feeling that he fits in, and never smiles in any of his school photographs. His favourite treats are his mother's flapjacks which he eats whilst playing old songs for her to sing, such as Cole Porter's "Don't Fence Me In". As an adult, he leads a gang of vicious criminals in the 1970s and does not think twice about knee-capping his victims. He cuts off the left leg of a henchman named Charlie for talking about him. In 1980, Staines stages his own death, and hires "Metal" Micky Dillon to identify the charred corpse of a tramp on whom Staines had planted his sovereign ring., Staines flees to Spain for gender reassignment surgery. After receiving breast implants and cosmetic surgery to her face, she is blackmailed by her surgeons who demand more money or they will inform the authorities about her identity. She returns to Britain as a blonde woman, adopts the name Gaynor Mason, and sells cosmetics door-to-door. In 1982, Gaynor becomes friends with Bryan and Marjorie Drake who live a couple of streets away from her childhood home. She gives their fourteen-year-old son, Peter, a football shirt and tells him that she might take him to a match someday. Needing money to pay for the next phase of the gender reassignment surgery, Staines/Mason reverts to her former life of crime. Using her natural male voice and adopting Metal Mickey's modus operandi of wearing a mask of Prime Minister Margaret Thatcher to conceal her identity, Staines robs the Drakes on the morning of 8 November 1982, stealing approximately £1.000 and some jewellery, including the necklace Marjorie was wearing. Bryan struggles to defend his family but is shoved by Staines and strikes his right temple on the table edge. The wound leaves him deaf for the rest of his life. After robbing the Drakes, Staines visits her mother in the guise of Mason in order to bid her good-bye. Feeling sorry for her, Mason hides £500 of the stolen money in a tin of her flapjacks. After finding Staines' fingerprints at the Drakes' home, and believing that Mason is Staines' companion rather than Staines himself, DCI Gene Hunt offers Mason money to lure Staines to one of Staines' old haunts, the Peacock pub. That night, however, she encounters Peter Drake who recognises her necklace as the one stolen from around his mother's neck the day before. Fearing for his life when she chases him, Peter cracks Mason's skull with a brick, retrieves the necklace, and runs away mistakenly thinking he killed her. Mason's gender and identity are revealed after she comes around in hospital. In attempting to escape, she takes down Hunt and DS Ray Carling before being kneed in the groin by DC Chris Skelton. She ultimately confesses in exchange for CID not telling her mother the truth and breaking her heart. She discourages Carling from resigning from the police and enlisting in the Army, telling him, "I want to go to sleep at night knowing there's [sic] cops like you helping keep good people like my mum safe."
- Colin Mitchell (c. 1949-c. 7 or 8 Nov. 1982) (Jason Haigh) is the son of Stanley Mitchell and the husband of Donna Mitchell Colin's mother is dead from cancer. He and Donna live beyond their means, trying to maintain appearances. He buys Donna a lovely house and car, none of it meaning anything to himself. At Donna's urging, Colin takes a job with the loan shark, Trevor Riley, whereupon his father, Stanley, cuts him out of his life. Colin takes out a life insurance policy with the intention of disappearing and being declared dead, in order for he and Donna to start a new life together. He and Donna each have separate reservations to fly to Turkey with him flying on 8 November 1982 and she following on 10 January 1983. They plan to later send for Stanley. Colin informs Stanley that he's left Riley's employ, and is taken back by Stanley. Colin then tells Stanley about the insurance scam that he and his wife Donna have planned to start their new life away from Riley. A furious Stanley pushes Colin who falls and fatally cracks his skull. Hoping to give meaning to Colin's death, Stanley attempts to frame Riley by applying Riley's trademark spiral brands to Colin's arm before driving the corpse to the wasteland by the canal in Colin's car and dumping the body. Unwilling to stuff his own son's body in the car boot, Stanley gently seats him in the passenger seat, proping him with folded blankets as if to make him comfortable even in death. He is reported missing by Donna. Days later, on 8 November 1982 his body is discovered floating in the canal by DCI Gene Hunt on the day he was to have flown to Turkey. The coroner opines that the low volume of water in his lungs suggests that he was killed on dry land, and notes the blunt force trauma to his right frontal lobe. The two facts suggesting murder to DI Alex Drake; while Hunt agrees with the possibility, he offers the alternative theory that Mitchell was drunk, fell, hit his head and fell in the river. Drake and the coroner agree that the scabbing on Mitchell's wrist wounds suggest they were received at the same time as the head wound.
- Donna Mitchell (Daisy Haggard) is the wife-cum-widow of Colin Mitchell Having grown up lower class, on the same council estate as Trevor Riley she and Colin live beyond their means to maintain appearances. Viewing Colin as smarter than Riley, she wants them to share in Riley's wealth; at Donna's urging, Colin takes a job with Riley. Colin buys her a lovely house and car, none of it meaning anything to himself. In order to get away from Riley, she and Colin each have separate reservations to fly to Turkey with him flying on 8 November 1982 and she following on 10 January 1983. They plan to send for Colin's father, Stanley. In exchange for Riley's promise that he would not touch Colin, Donna allows Riley to copulate with her; Riley films the assignation. She reports Colin missing. Days later, when DS Ray Carling and DC Chris Skelton notify her of Colin's death, she insists that he is "just missing" and will not be convinced until the two show her Colin's body. Thereafter, she cannot stop wailing, and Carling and Skelton put her in Hunt's office not knowing what else to do with her. DI Alex Drake calms her down and asks if Colin had any problems with Trevor Riley. Donna insists that Riley would never do such a thing. After DS Ray Carling discovers the flight tickets in Colin's car, she admits to Drake and Hunt that she knew Colin had taken out a life insurance policy and was to disappear when she filed the missing person's report She takes in Colin's father, Stanley when he discharges himself from hospital after being beaten by Riley's men at Bill's wrecking yard. After Drake and Carling deduce Stanley's guilt, she and Hunt pretend to arrest Donna, successfully coercing a confession out of Stanley.
- Stanley Mitchell (Tom Georgeson) is the father of Colin Mitchell Some time prior to 1982, Stanley's wife develops cancer. In an effort to get the best for her, Stanley gets money from loan shark Trevor Riley to pay for a private hospital. His efforts were for nought. His slow repayment prompts Riley and his men to scar Stanley with spiral brands around his left forearm. When Stanley's son, Colin, goes to work for Riley, Stanley cuts him out of his life. Colin later tells him he's quit and is taken back by Stanley. Colin then tells Stanley about the insurance scam that he and his wife Donna have planned to start their new life away from Riley. A furious Stanley pushes Colin who falls and fatally cracks his skull. Hoping to give meaning to Colin's death, Stanley attempts to frame Riley by applying Riley's trademark spiral brands to Colin's arm before driving the corpse to the wasteland by the canal in Colin's car and dumping the body. Unwilling to stuff his own son's body in the car boot, Stanley gently seats him in the passenger seat, propping him with folded blankets as if to make him comfortable even in death. After Donna files a missing person's report with the police, Stanley makes a telephone inquiry with the police as well. When DCI Gene Hunt and DI Alex Drake arrive to notify him of Colin's death, Stanley either assumes or pretends to assume that the pair have come to talk with his fledgling but elderly neighbourhood watch group about community safety. After the meeting, Hunt and Drake deliver the news of his son's death, and ask about the spiral brands on Colin's arm. Stanley tells the two of Trevor Riley, a loanshark for whom Colin worked. Stanley and his cohorts attempt to defend Bill from Riley's men who visit him at his junk yard with the intent of branding him for speaking out about Riley to Hunt and Drake. Stanley and the others are savagely beaten for their efforts. He checks himself out of hospital and is taken in by his daughter-in-law, Donna. After Drake and Carling deduce Stanley's guilt, she and Hunt pretend to arrest Donna, successfully coercing a confession out of Stanley.
- Daniel Moore (Rupert Graves) is on the board of the London Docklands Development Corporation trying to redevelop London's East End. Born in the East End, himself, Moore is a self-made man worth a million pounds or more, and is a personal friend of "the old handbag herself" (i.e., Prime Minister Margaret Thatcher). On Monday, 27 July 1981 a dynamite bomb at the Royal Docks explodes, killing a dog. A note soon arrives at Fenchurch East CID, made of letters cut out from magazines, reading "Forget the dog, next time it's Moore. London Liberation Front" WPC Sharon "Shaz" Granger suggests that the Moore in question is Daniel Moore, prompting Hunt to call her a "lobotomised Essex Girl." Nevertheless, Hunt and Drake proceed to Moore's office. Drake is intrigued to be meeting "a real, living, breathing 'Thatcherite' businessman," with whom she promptly begins to flirt in front of Hunt. Moore declines Hunt's offer of protection. Moore stops by CID to take Drake for a ride in his DeLorean, in which he asks her out to dinner that evening. They discover an alarm-clock bomb hidden under the seat with a note to frighten Moore, "On wedding day, you die," but it frightens Drake quite a bit more, causing her to pound on car and scream uncontrollably "Get me out, get out!" while remembering the car bombing that killed (or, rather, will kill) her parents. Though they both laugh after the bomb only rings without exploding, Drake's laughs turn to sobs. Moore accepts Hunt's earlier offer of police protection in the person of Drake, and the two dine together at Luigi's, where Moore asks her what she would like to do that night; she responds him, "I would really like to see if you could surprise me. I would love to know if that is possible." Surprise her he does, by taking her to the Blitz nightclub in Covent Garden where 'Boy' George O'Dowd checks Alex's coat. The two dance and kiss, but go no further that night. The next night, however, after being rebuked by her mother, Drake seeks to "piss off that portion of [Drake's] id that conjured up [her] mother;" Drake tarts herself up to seduce Moore, knowing that her mother would never approve of the Thatcherite, and that no one in the real world will know that she fantasised about shagging him. When Moore's elevator opens, however, Drake finds him in flagrante delicto with another woman, and departs. Moore invites CID to a street party on 29 July in the Bonds' neighbourhood to celebrate both the royal wedding and the redevelopment of the Docklands which, he claims, will not only provide a job to every man there, but make money for the property owners. Alone, later, Moore makes Drake an open offer of a job before George Bonds shouts to the crowd, "We are all prostitutes," and detonates his suicide bomb, killing only himself.
- Boy George (born George Alan O'Dowd, 14 June 1961) (actor uncredited); still a year and a half away from becoming a household name with Culture Club; is a Blitz Kid working in the coat check at Blitz nightclub in Covent Garden when Danny Moore takes DI Alex Drake dancing there on the night of Monday, 27 July 1981. Drake recognises him when he takes her coat and welcomes her to Blitz, happily responding to him, "Thanks, George!" WPC Sharon "Shaz" Granger is presumably acquainted with Boy George, as she frequents the club and considers some of the Blitz regulars to be her best friends.
- Delfine Parks (c. 1959-c. June 1981) is described by DCI Gene Hunt as being Black, in her early twenties, and approximately 5'2" (158 cm) Parks is a regular church-goer and a member of the choir where she meets fellow choir member, Ryan Burns whom he is courting and who gives her his Saint Christopher medal. After work one evening, she has something to eat and tells her mother she is going to church although there was no choir practice that night. When she and Burns meet up, she rejects him; out of rage, he rips the St. Christopher medal off of her neck, slashes, strangles and kills her. Delfine's body is found in June 1981, beaten and strangled by Burns who slashes her breast and leaves a lesion on the side of her neck, all in an unorganised fashion.
- Mrs. Parks is the mother of the late Delfine Parks She still hears Delfine's voice in her church choir and hopes to never stop hearing it.
- Caroline Price, LL.B., (1945 - 10:00, 10 October 1981) (Amelia Bullmore) is Alex Drake's mother and Tim Price's wife. A high-profile defence solicitor, she practices with her barrister husband. She is considered by Gene Hunt to be "lefty", and is particularly opposed to police corruption and incompetence. She is one of a group of lawyers who have been trying to lay the foundation for slavery reparations. She and Tim are friends of liberal police reformer, Lord Leslie Scarman. The Prices keep a spare key to their townhouse under a concrete turtle to the left of the front steps; young Alex is familiar enough with the hidden key to retrieve it in adulthood. At 21:00, 26 July 1981 news coverage includes footage of Caroline's press conference following the acquittal of a man against whom the Metropolitan Police were discovered to have fabricated evidence. In episode 1.4, "The Missing Link", it is revealed that Caroline has been having an affair with their associate Evan White, and had been involved in a government cover-up. From the top of the stairs, young Alex sees Caroline and Evan kissing. On Tuesday, 28 July 1981, Caroline arrives at the Fenchurch East police station to represent George Bonds, a teenaged bombing suspect whose confession DI Alex Drake is concerned will be excused by the courts if obtained without a solicitor; Drake has referred George to Caroline in order to meet the woman whom only Drake knows to be her mother. Just as she storms into CID, Caroline is appalled to find a woman bent over a desk, skirt up, yelling at DCI Gene Hunt, "Would you please just stamp my arse?!" After gasping, "Mum," and correcting herself to say, "Bum," a nervous Drake offers her hand to her unsuspecting mother, telling her how pleased she is to meet her and how she admires her, which Caroline assumes to be police sarcasm before demanding to speak with her client, George. George denies knowing the source of the dynamite, and Drake and Caroline orally spar over Caroline's accusation that the police would plant the dynamite to frame George and clear the case; Drake eventually calls the condescendingly smug Caroline "a rude bitch"; and theorises that George may be her parents' killer in less than eleven weeks' time, suggesting that, "He may repay you by blowing you to kingdom come," at which time, Hunt, taken aback, turns to face her. Caroline surprises Drake by waiting for her outside of the police station and asking to have a drink. Over wine at Luigi's, Caroline apologises for embarrassing "a fellow female in a male profession". Drake encourages Caroline to tell her about the latter's daughter, Alex Price (i.e., Drake's younger self). Caroline describes her as, "Bright as a penny, but easily distracted." When Drake declines her request to betray her colleagues' trust and report their actions to Caroline, the latter chastises former, stating, ironically, "Thank God, the only thing my daughter shares with you is her name. I'd be ashamed if she grew up to be like you." In order to "piss off that portion of [Drake's] id that conjured up [her] mother," Drake tarts herself up to seduce Moore, knowing that her mother would never approve of the Thatcherite, and that no one in the real world will know that she fantasised about shagging him. When Moore's elevator opens, however, Drake finds him in flagrante delicto with another woman and departs. The next day, 29 July 1981, when all of young Alex's classmates have stayed home to watch the royal wedding of Prince Charles and Lady Diana Spencer with their respective parents, Caroline leaves her daughter alone at school, and admonishes a faculty member, "Make sure she concentrates. She's easily distracted." Instead of spending the day with her daughter, she returns to Fenchurch East to tend to her client, George, from whom CID have obtained a confession. Caroline Price's arrival and accusation that Drake is incompetent prompts the retort, "At least I'm not out trying to score cheap points off coppers while my daughter is stuck at school on her own for the royal wedding," and the more confusing, "I have felt guilty about that all my life, but not any more; she is your daughter!" That night, Drake writes "Mum Dad" on the final day of her butcher paper wall calendar, 10 October 1981, and draws a red crux ordinaria to mark their forthcoming deaths. She considers the possibilities that she can save their lives and that her reason for being in 1981 is to do so. As if on cue, Caroline drops by to see how Drake is following being nearly killed by George's suicide bomb that afternoon. Drake admits to being "a mess"; Caroline offers words of encouragement. Unlike Drake and the audience, Caroline is unaware of the irony of Caroline comforting her daughter in the wake of witnessing a bombing. Caroline assures Drake that she had no idea that George was capable of such an act. Drake invites her in, but is very happy that Caroline has to decline because it is in order to pick up Drake's younger self from school. Caroline and Drake gradually develop mutual respect and fondness over the course of the first series. In episode 1.6, "Over the Hill", adult Alex leaves eight-year-old murder witness, Donny Cale, in Caroline's care overnight while young Alex is away on a school trip. Caroline confides in adult Alex on that she is going to take two years off work in order to spend time with her daughter, and says how much she loves young Alex. The next day, 10 October 1981, Caroline and young Alex are to be driven by Tim to a railway station for a three-day trip. Caroline is unaware that her client Arthur Layton (Sean Harris) was hired by Tim to plant a bomb in the car. The bomb detonates at or about 10:00 a.m., killing both Tim and Caroline but sparing young Alex who had alighted to fetch her escaped balloon whilst the road was blocked. Both young and adult Alex witness the horrifying explosion. Approximately thirteen months later, Caroline haunts adult Alex in her dreams after Alex sees fellow time-traveller, Martin Summers, kill his younger self, thereby demonstrating that the timeline is not fixed. Alex's vision of Caroline chastises a guilt-ridden Alex for having failed to save her life. Later in the episode, however, Alex asks her mother what she can do and Caroline responds that Alex will keep fighting and go back to Molly "because you're her mother".
- Timothy Price, QC (1942 - 10:00, 10 October 1981) (Andrew Clover, not credited until episode 8, "Alex's Big Day" in order to hide the Clown Angel of Death's true identity) is the father of Alex Drake (née Alexandra Price) and both the husband and law partner of Caroline Price. He is a high-profile barrister defending accused criminals and is involved with numerous anti-establishment movements. In episode 1.4, "The Missing Link", CID discover that Tim had represented members of the Revolutionary Worker's Front to get them off criminal charges, and was also involved in a government cover-up along with Caroline. They are friends of police reformer, Lord Scarman. His young daughter, Alex Price, enjoys playing in his office as he works, and runs about in his court wig; the inside lid of his wig case contains a picture she drew of their family (episode 1.8, "Alex's Big Day"). He reads to her at night from The Lion, the Witch and the Wardrobe, producing different voices for the different characters. It is revealed in episode 1.4, "The Missing Link" that Tim has been cuckolded by Caroline with their associate, Evan White. The two break off the affair and are unaware when Tim learns of it. On Friday, 9 October 1981, he is visited by DI Alex Drake (whom he is unaware is his daughter), who warns him that someone is out to kill Caroline and him and pleads with him to change his routine and/or seek police protection. He assures adult Alex that people are always threatening to kill him and that he will not be intimidated. Having failed to reason with him, Drake arrests Tim and Caroline on trumped-up drugs possession charges in order that they will not be killed by a car bomb the next morning. The two are released early the next morning, 10 October 1981, before Drake arrives for duty. (episode 1.8, "Alex's Big Day"). That morning, Tim Price borrows Evan White's blue Ford Escort in order to drive Caroline and Alex to the railway station. While the Prices and Gene Hunt and adult Alex are stopped on either side of a lorry turning around in the middle of the road at 10:00 in the morning, young Alex exits the Escort to fetch a balloon which has escaped through her open window, and adult Alex exits Hunt's Quattro to save her parents' lives. In front of adult Alex's horrified eyes, Tim appears to change into the Clown and wink at her. Adult Alex has only enough time to process the sight and ask, "Dad?" before the car explodes, killing both Tim and Caroline in view of Alex's young and adult eyes. Subsequently, a video is found in which Tim explains that, having discovered Caroline's affair with Evan White, Tim does not want to live a "life of quiet desperation". He intends to kill himself, Caroline, and "our beloved daughter, Alexandra."
- Trevor Riley (Sam Spruell), having grown up lower class on the same council estate as Donna Mitchell is a former seller of designer knock-offs. In 1982, he is the principal of Trevor Riley Financial, a loan shark posing as a legitimate financial investments broker. He and his minions rule by intimidation and violence. They burn spiral scars onto victims' arms. Three of them beat Bill with baseball bats and drag him under the wheels of their car. Donna Mitchell allows Riley to copulate with her in exchange for Riley's promise that he will not touch her husband and his employee, Colin Mitchell. Riley films the assignation. Riley is smart enough to have kept his operation under CID's radar. until the death of Colin Mitchell who had been killed by his own father, Stanley. Stanley attempts to frame Riley for the death by applying Riley's trademark spiral brands to Colin's arm and naming Riley when Hunt and Drake question him about Colin's death. Riley is unintimidated by Hunt and tosses him the business card of his solicitor. He asks Hunt if, hypothetically, he were to have killed Colin, why would he have signed the crime with his supposedly trademark spiral brands? He threatens to charge Hunt with harassment, Hunt staples Riley's necktie to the desk. Although despising Riley, Drake agrees that the branding looks like a frame. Riley's men visit Bill at his junk yard with the intention of branding him for speaking out about Riley to Hunt and Drake. They beat Stanley and the others who attempt to defend Bill. This prompts Hunt to break into Riley's office at night in search of evidence. They find the VHS tape of Riley's liaison with Donna Mitchell, locked in a file cabinet. Riley comes back that night, but the attempts by DS Ray Carling and DC Chris Skelton to warn Hunt and Drake are foiled by dead radop batteries. In desperation, Carling and Skelton shatter Riley's car window to set off its alarm and steal the car, just as Riley is approaching his office door. Riley holds on to Carling as they drive away, but soon falls in the parking lot and sees Drake and Hunt leave the scene. Riley exacts revenge against Hunt and Drake, having his henchmen beat Hunt with bats Drake hides behind her couch when they break into her darkened flat; instead of searching the flat, they merely destroy her television and depart. The next morning, Hunt seeks solace in a jail cell to plot his retribution,. and refuses to promise Drake that he will do it the right way. Hunt cuffs Riley walking out of his office and drives him in a recovered car to Bill's junkyard. Sending Bill off for a half hour with some cash, Hunt climbs into the crane cab and destroys the car with Riley still in the back seat as an interrogation technique. Drake and company arrive in Hunt's Quattro to reveal the real killer. Riley and the car nevertheless plunge several metres when Hunt releases the crane. In the end, Carling and Skelton arrest Riley for a long list of unpaid parking tickets.
- Leonard Roseberry-Sykes (Simon Molloy) is the owner of the luxury yacht Sunborn where he hosts parties. Roseberry-Sykes is characterised by DCI Gene Hunt as being "a bigger pain in the arse than a bad dose of piles More importantly to Hunt, however, Roseberry-Sykes and Police Commissioner Sir David McNee are both Freemasons or, in Hunt's words, "members of the funny handshake brigade." Ryan Burns works as a waiter at Roseberry-Sykes' yacht parties. As Hunt expects, he is quite upset when Drake arrests Burns during a party in early August 1981 and informs him that a rape took place aboard his yacht two nights earlier. DS Ray Carling's assault of another attendee only worsens the situation, and Hunt has to field a telephone call from an angry Commissioner McNee.
- Elsie Staines (Rita Davies) is the elderly mother of gangster, George Staines. Struggling to make ends meet on her small pension, she uses a space heater to keep her sitting room very warm because of her rheumatism, and she never misses Pebble Mill at One. She resides a couple of streets away from Bryan and Marjorie Drake. When George was a boy, Elsie would sing old songs while he accompanied her on the piano and ate her flapjacks. In 1980, she buries a man she believes to be her son. On the morning 8 November 1982, Elsie is visited by Gaynor Mason, a woman claiming to be an old friend of George. In reality, Mason is her partially gender-reassigned son, George, coming to bid Elsie good-bye. Feeling sorry for her, Mason hides £500 of the stolen money in a tin of her flapjacks. Shortly before 13.00 that afternoon, the money is discovered by DCI Gene Hunt when he and DI Alex Drake interview Elsie concerning the discovery of George's fingerprints in the Drakes' house. Later that afternoon or the next morning, Elsie is shocked to discover the £500 in the biscuit tin. Not knowing how it got there, she refuses to keep that which is not hers and posts it in the mail to the Drakes. In exchange for Mason's confession, Hunt arrests her under that name, declining the opportunity to take credit for collaring the infamous George Staines - so as not to break Elsie's heart.
- Steve Strange (born Steven John Harrington on 28 May 1959) (portrayed by himself) is the lead singer of Visage and the host at Blitz nightclub in Covent Garden. When Danny Moore takes DI Alex Drake dancing at Blitz on the night of Monday, 27 July 1981, Strange and Visage are performing their "new single" "Fade to Grey". [Although it was released on 10 November 1980, more than eight months before the depicted performance.]
- Street Girl 1 (Leanne Lakey) is a prostitute who tells DI Alex Drake in early August 1981 that fellow prostitute Trixie Walsh is "OK, unless you get on the wrong side of her." Drake tells her to call if any girls go missing. A day later, she informs Drake that Ryan Burns has taken Street Girl 2 toward the river in a white Ford Escort
- Street Girl 2 (Tracey Wiles) is a prostitute who tells DI Alex Drake in early August 1981 that fellow prostitute Trixie Walsh "has a soft spot for the lame ducks." Drake tells her to call if any girls go missing. Rapist/murder Ryan Burns hires her a day later and drives her to an abandoned warehouse near the river, where CID find her being held by Burns at knifepoint.
- Trixie Walsh (Claire Rushbrook) is a prostitute and colleague of Nina Akaboa who tells her in early August 1981 of being raped and cut by Ryan Burns. With Nina too scared and humiliated to testify, Trixie reports to Sergeant Viv James' reception desk to file a rape complaint. She tells DCI Gene Hunt and DI Alex Drake occurred at a party aboard Leonard Roseberry-Sykes' luxury yacht Sunborn moored near Tower Bridge. Although she has cut herself on her left breast where Nina Akaboa and Delfine Parks were cut, Walsh's cut is different in that it is much less deep and appears organised whereas Delfine's injuries were disorganised; Walsh also lacks the lesion found on the other two. Her story comes into doubt when DS Ray Carling discovers that she has been fired by her escort agency for taking money from a client who refused to pay, and Hunt suspects that she made up the story to damage the reputation of the agency as being one whose escorts cry 'rape'. After the extremely religious Burns swears on a Holy Bible that he has never even seen Walsh, Hunt is certain that she creating the story, and wants to know why. Despite her initial refusal to tell Hunt the truth, she finally opens up about Nina.
- Zippy (Ronnie Le Drew) and George (Mark Mander) (both voiced by Roy Skelton) are puppet characters from the children's television programme, Rainbow, which was produced by Thames Television for ITV between 1972 and 1992. In Episode 1.1, "Deja Vu", Alex Drake sees Zippy and George on television and expects them to start talking to her in a manner similar to Sam Tyler's experiences with television during his coma. In a later dream scene (presumably Alex's) they do indeed speak, but to Alex's daughter, Molly Drake, telling her that Alex will never return to her. The dream sequence appears as if an episode of Rainbow, albeit one set in the Fenchurch East CID anteroom. In the scene, Zippy wears a Metropolitan Police Service peaked cap and wields a traditional police truncheon.

Henry Lee

Henry Lee was played by James Clarke in the TV show only having a minor role but quite an important one serving as the bar drinker in episode 4 just behind Sam Tyler, although he is not given a name in the show, the actor James Clarke decided to name the character Henry Lee after Henry Lee III who fought in the American war.

=== 2008 and 1980s characters ===
- Peter Drake (Perry Millward in 1982; unseen in 2008) is a fourteen year-old boy in 1982, at which time he lives with his parents, Bryan Drake and Marjorie Drake, at Number 2, Stanley Road, in London. Adult Alex characterises him as "an untrustworthy, two-timing, two-faced, spineless, selfish, little shit". He is smitten with a girl named Suzie. He enjoys the game Perfection. He hates hospitals and though he is reluctant to admit it, football. His musical tastes are anachronistic as his records in 1982 include one by Shakespears Sister who do not form until 1988; alternatively, given the exceptionally relevant lyrics of their 1991 single shown, "Stay", the record's presence in his room may be no more corporeal than were The Clown Angel of Death's appearances throughout the first series. He unknowingly first meets his future wife, the adult DI Alex Drake, on 8 November 1982, after his parents' home is burgled and his father deafened. The following night, he sees his parents' friend Gaynor Mason wearing the necklace that had been stolen from around his mother's neck. Fearing for his life when she chases him, Peter cracks Mason's skull with a brick, retrieves the necklace, and runs away mistakenly thinking he killed her. He eventually meets Alex Price, a girl roughly five years his junior. Peter confides in her about his assault on Gaynor Mason only insofar as to tell her that he "did a bad thing" when he was a teenager. Although he prefers to be called 'Peter', Alex will tend to call him 'Pete'. Alex becomes familiar with the loud 'creak' of Peter's bed in his parents' house, and he shows her that he keeps his marijuana stash inside of a square, blue satchel. Despite having been admonished not to by Alex's older self years earlier, Peter condescendingly tells Alex that her bad mood is the result of premenstrual tension. He also blames her when they run out of petrol while he is driving her across France and have to wait out a pouring rainstorm for hours, again despite her elder self's specific instruction not to blame her. Instead of getting a job to support his wife, Alex, Peter lies around in bed, "working on the novel that only exists in his head". Alex never realises during their relationship that his 'tell' when lying is to put his hands in his pockets and look down. In 1996, Peter fathered Molly Drake, named after Peter's childhood cat. Six months after Molly's birth, Peter abandons his family, leaving Alex as Molly's custodial parent, "never to be seen again". Molly inherits Peter's tendency to put her hands in her pockets and look at the floor when lying. He is travelling in Canada with a woman named Judy in 2008 at the time of Molly's twelfth birthday and Alex's shooting, and is not believed to have sent Molly a birthday present. Alex remains resentful of Peter's selfishness and irresponsibility. Despite telling Peter's father that she has realised that she cannot change her timeline, Adult Alex tries to instill some behavioural changes in her younger self's future husband. In exchange for not arresting him for assaulting Gaynor Mason, Peter promises her that he will look after his parents and be nice to whatever girl he ends up with, "be it Suzie or a girl called Alex." Her direction that he look after Molly is naturally lost on Peter who understands her to mean his cat which peeks her head out from under his bed and meows at that moment. Since, it was revealed Alex has died, it is possible that Peter will have to raise Molly.
- Ventriloquist Keith Harris (born 21 September 1947) (portrayed by himself in archival footage and new audio) and his puppet, Orville the Duck, provide insight to DI Alex Drake concerning her condition in 2008. The two appear on Drake's television on or before the night of 7 November 1982, and awaken her from her sleep. Orville is miserable (mispronounced 'miserabable') because he is worried about Alex and thinks she is going to die. Harris claims that she is not going to die, reminds Orville that she is at the hospital, and reveals that there were two beautiful bouquets of flowers already at the hospital for her before she arrived. None of this makes Orville happy. Drake talks to her television, telling Orville that he should be happy that she's made it to the hospital, and appears to take no note of the fact one or two parties were able to send flowers in time to arrive before her ambulance.
- Morph is a plasticine-like kid animated by Tony Hart on Take Hart (from 1977) and Hartbeat (from 1984). He appears on a programme that DI Alex Drake is watching in 1982 as she perceives her body being defibrulated in 2008. The analogous characters in Life on Mars are the stop-motion animated versions of Sam Tyler, Gene Hunt and a random nonce, in Sam's drug-induced Camberwick Green hallucination in episode 2.5.
- Evan White, LL.B. (Stephen Campbell Moore) is both Alex and Molly Drake's godfather. In 1981, he works as a solicitor under Alex's parents Tim and Caroline Price, representing the murder suspect in episode 1.3, "Nothing Changes. In episode 1.4, "The Missing Link", CID discover that White has been having an affair with Caroline, and adult Alex uncovers repressed memories of having seen the pair behaving amorously in her youth. After the death of Alex's parents in a car bomb at the end of episode 1.8, "Alex's Big Day", a video cassette left by Tim revealed that Tim knew about the affair and decided to kill himself, Caroline and Alex. On the morning of Saturday, 10 October 1981, near the start of the climax of episode 1.8, "Alex's Big Day", Evan and Tim secure the release of their client, Arthur Layton. The same morning, Evan loans his blue Ford Escort to Tim with which to drive Caroline to a railway station in the company of their young daughter Alex Price, Evan's god-daughter. Layton plants a bomb in the Escort, apparently to aid Tim in carrying out his murder-suicide. The audience and, presumably, adult Alex Drake see both Layton and Evan standing on the grass, overlooking the explosion in episode 1.8, "Alex's Big Day". Although Alex (as young Alex Price) remembers having motored past a walking Layton a minute earlier, Evan's presence is unexplained: Gene Hunt and adult Alex leave him at the courthouse when they race to stop the bomb; he is not in Gene's Audi Quattro with Gene and adult Alex; he had already loaned his Escort to Tim; and no other cars are seen behind the speeding Quattro. When Gene Hunt carries young Alex past him, neither Evan nor young Alex acknowledges each other, nor does Evan run down to the Escort or adult Alex. For twenty-seven years, Alex will mistakenly remember Evan - rather than Gene Hunt (a stranger to her) - as having been the man rushing toward her in a black overcoat and wrapping himself around her to shield her from the horrific view of her parents' burning corpses. After the explosion, Evan asks DCI Gene Hunt and DI Drake (i.e. adult Alex) for their help in gaining custody of his god-daughter, young Alex Price, as she has no close blood relatives; and that young Alex never be told the truth that her father killed her mother and himself and tried to kill her. When adult Alex comments on Gene's destruction of evidence, to wit the unwound and broken video cassette, Hunt replies, "How would you like to go through life knowing that your Daddy tried to blow you to kingdom come?" The deception is generally assumed [although never confirmed] to have led to Layton blackmailing Evan and to the chain of events that gets Alex shot in 2008 and sent back to 1981 at the beginning of episode 1.1, "Deja Vu". This theory is expressed by adult Alex to Gene while Evan and child Alex depart CID after Gene destroys the cassette at the end of episode 1.8, "Alex's Big Day". Recalling what Layton says on the telephone as he escorts her down the gangplank before shooting her in "Deja Vu", she tells Gene, "I'm the piece of his past, or I will be. He'll be blackmailed by Layton for not telling the truth." Evan raises Alex Price who, years later as adult Alex Drake, names him godfather of her own daughter, Molly Drake whom he calls "Scrap". He buys Molly a BlackBerry for her birthday in 2008 and promises to get her a "seriously chocolaty" cake for her party later in the day. Alex calls him to take care of Molly whilst she completes the paperwork in the aftermath of their mutual hostage situation at the start of episode 1.1, "Deja Vu". As Evan and Molly begin to walk away, Alex promises Molly that she will be done in time for the two to blow out Molly's candles together.
- The Young PC (Mason Kayne) (credited as James Mason) is a ghost who appears in all eight episodes of the third series. He is dressed in an old fashioned police uniform with the epaulette number 6620 visible on his shoulders and has a horrific injury to the left side of his face, the result of the shotgun blast which killed him. He is first referred to in a 2008 news report at the beginning of episode 1 prior to Alex waking up in a hospital in 1983, and then appears in person throughout the rest of the series at various points, seeming to both be in need Drake’s help and silently offer her guidance. For the most part he shows very little emotion but is clearly seen to smile eerily at the end of episode 1 when Drake finds a file relating to Sam Tyler and he is visibly emotionally pained when he appears in the CID offices following the death of Sergeant Viv James in episode 6. The ghost can only be seen by Alex Drake, although in the series finale Gene Hunt also seems to sense the presence of the ghost standing behind him, but when he turns to look at him directly he is gone. The ghost's reflection is shown briefly in the glass door of Hunt's office and also earlier in the episode, in the place of DCI Gene Hunt when Hunt is struck to the ground by Keats. In both appearances he is shown without any facial injuries. It is revealed in the climax of the series that the ghost is a 19-year-old Gene Hunt, who was killed on his first week on the beat on Coronation Day in 1953, Alex finds his remains buried in a field in Lancashire along with his Police ID Card. DCI Gene Hunt seems ashamed in some way of his younger self, referring to himself in the third person when he speaks of him. Hunt describes himself as "a skinny lad, needed fattening up", an adage coined by his old mentor PC Morrison. During the revelation in the farmhouse, Keats refers to Hunt as "This boy in a man's uniform", and then takes great delight in talking about Hunt's immature adolescent machismo particularly towards drinking and women, something which the adult Hunt has never grown out of.

=== 1950s characters ===
- A clip from the 1950s BBC TV series Dixon of Dock Green, with PC George Dixon bidding the audience goodnight, is shown post-credits in the final episode. Dixon originally appeared in the Ealing Studios film The Blue Lamp, in which he was shot and killed. Dixon, played by Jack Warner, subsequently went on to star in Dixon of Dock Green despite the paradox of the character already being dead. Characters from The Blue Lamp, albeit not George Dixon, had previously received consideration as time travellers in the 1988 BBC Two drama The Black and Blue Lamp, in which Dixon's murderer and a policeman were transposed between the 1950s and the 1980s. The 1980s segment featured a Gene Hunt-like character named Superintendent Cherry, played by Kenneth Cranham.
