= Gene Hunt =

Life on Mars and Ashes to Ashes character

- Life on Mars and Ashes to Ashes character
- Philip Glenister as Gene Hunt in Ashes to Ashes
- First appearance: Life on Mars: Episode 1, series 1
- Last appearance: Ashes to Ashes: Episode 8, series 3
- Portrayed by: Philip Glenister (older); Mason Kayne (younger); Colm Meaney (US pilot); Harvey Keitel (US version)
- Books: The Rules of Modern Policing; The Future of Modern Policing

In-universe information
- Title: Detective Chief Inspector
- Occupation: Police Officer; Greater Lancaster Constabulary (1953); Greater Manchester Police (1953-1980); Metropolitan Police (1980-1983)
- Family: Stuart Hunt (brother; deceased)
- Spouse: Unnamed wife (divorced before events of Ashes to Ashes in 1981)
- Nationality: British

DCI Gene Hunt is a fictional character in BBC One's science fiction/police procedural drama Life on Mars and its sequel, Ashes to Ashes. The character is portrayed by Philip Glenister in both shows. His younger self is portrayed by Mason Kayne. In the American adaption, he is portrayed by Harvey Keitel.

The character is portrayed as politically incorrect, brutal, and corrupt, but fundamentally good. Hunt is often depicted to maintain a love–hate relationship with both Sam Tyler (John Simm) and Alex Drake (Keeley Hawes), the protagonists of Life on Mars and Ashes to Ashes, respectively.

The character received critical and public acclaim for his role in Life on Mars, being dubbed a "national hero", an unlikely sex symbol and a "top cop". A third and final series of Ashes to Ashes was said to "reveal all about Gene Hunt and what his alternative world really means in a stunning finale" and that the "truth [would] out". The character is ultimately revealed to be an integral part of the strange world that both Sam Tyler and Alex Drake inhabit.

== Life on Mars ==
During Life on Mars, Hunt is in command of Manchester and Salford Police's A-Division CID.

Throughout the programme Hunt is respected by the characters under his command, mainly Chris Skelton (Marshall Lancaster) and Ray Carling (Dean Andrews). During the two series, Hunt often uses unnecessary force while making arrests and conducting interviews, along with practising "noble-cause corruption" demonstrated by his fabrication and falsifying of evidence in order to secure convictions but never for personal gain. In response to this, he has been referred to as an "old-style cop" and "maverick". Hunt also believes that there is a "very fine line between a criminal and a copper".

Hunt often clashes with Sam Tyler (John Simm), the protagonist of the series. Eventually, during the second series their relationship improves and they become friends.

== Ashes to Ashes ==
During Ashes to Ashes, Hunt is in command of the Metropolitan Police's Fenchurch East CID.

=== Series 1 ===
During the first episode, it is revealed that following Life on Mars, Hunt worked with Sam Tyler for a further seven years until Tyler crashed his car into a river. Shortly after in February 1980, Hunt transferred from the Greater Manchester Police (which Manchester and Salford Police by then had become) to the London Metropolitan Police, along with Chris Skelton and Ray Carling.

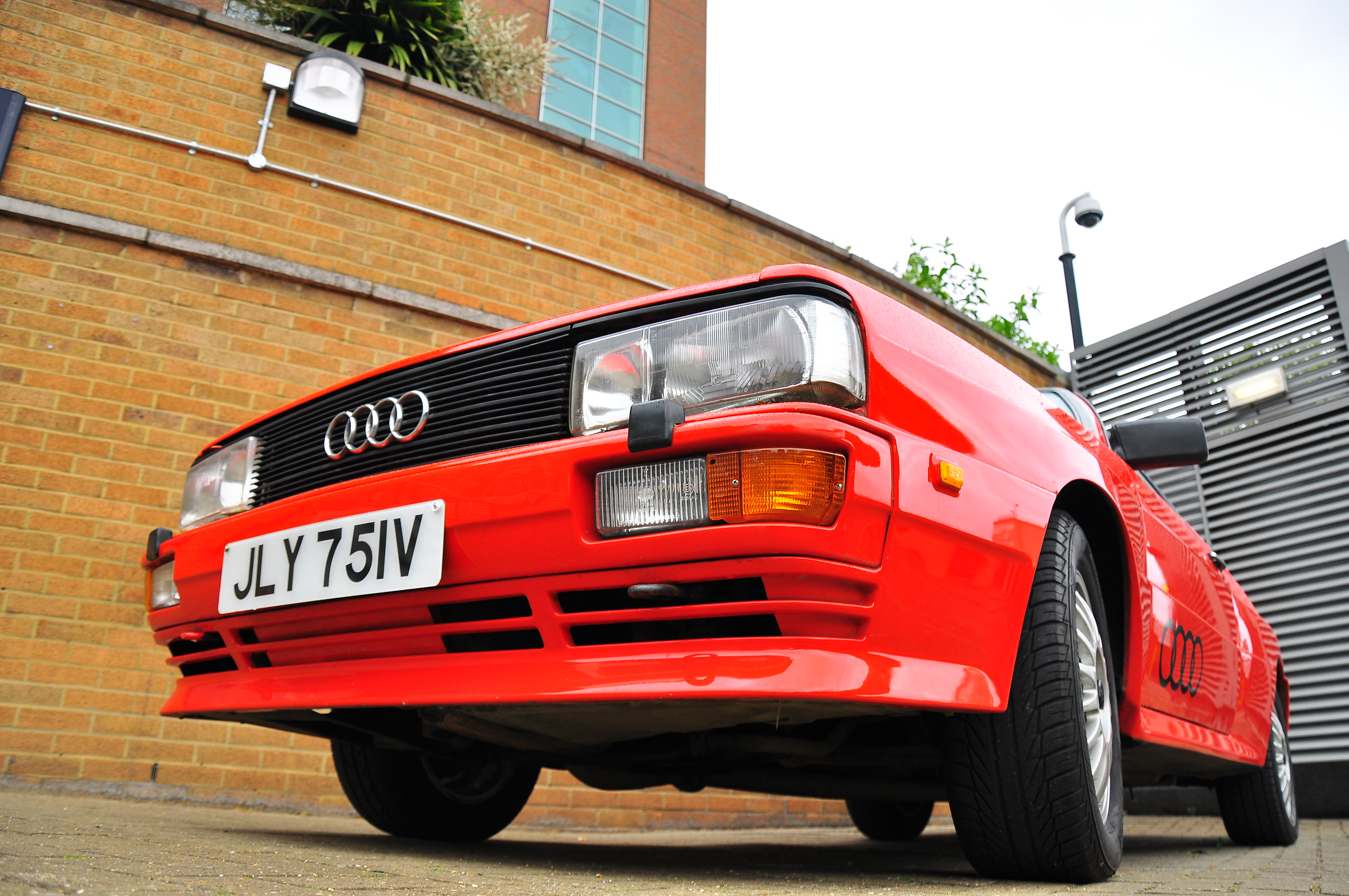
Gene Hunt's Quattro in the car park of BBC Television Centre

The first series, set in 1981, reveals Hunt to have divorced and replaced his Ford Cortina, as seen in Life on Mars, with an imported Audi Quattro. He is also displayed to be more professional, less aggressive and calmer than when last seen in Life on Mars, set in 1973. Hunt first meets Alex Drake (Keeley Hawes), the protagonist, during a police drugs raid at a party. Initially, he mistakenly believes that she is a prostitute and is unaware that like Sam Tyler, she has travelled back in time from the future.

During the series, the main storyline follows Alex Drake in her struggle to return to the present day. In order to do this, she believes that preventing the death of her parents, Tim (Andrew Clover) and Caroline Price (Amelia Bullmore), will enable her to return. While watching the death of her parents in the finale of the first series, she discovers that the person she remembers taking her hand as a child was Gene Hunt and not Evan White (Stephen Campbell Moore) as she previously thought. This leads her to question if Hunt is real and not a figment of her imagination as she thought.

=== Series 2 ===
The second series, set in 1982, introduces a new storyline of both Hunt and Alex Drake working together in order to expose corruption within Fenchurch East CID. As well as the corruption storyline, Drake is stalked by Martin Summers (Gwilym Lee and Adrian Dunbar) who also claims to be from the future. After several discoveries and unofficial investigations led by Hunt and Drake, it is revealed that the newly introduced character, Charlie Mackintosh (Roger Allam) is heavily involved in the corruption. During episode four, after finding out that Hunt and Drake know about his corruption, Mackintosh shoots himself and with his dying words warns Hunt and Drake of "Operation Rose", but dies before he can reveal more details. Summers, also involved in Operation Rose, plants a tape stolen from Drake on Hunt's desk on which she had questioned his existence and motives. After playing the tape, Hunt furiously demands an explanation from Drake, who is forced to explain that she is from the future, which enrages Hunt leading him to think that she has taken him for a fool.

During the series, Hunt and Drake begin to notice that files and evidence have gone missing. Eventually it is revealed that Chris Skelton had been paid large sums of money to undermine the investigation into Operation Rose, and had done so in order to pay for his wedding to Shaz Granger (Montserrat Lombard). Without informing those involved in Rose that Skelton has been discovered, Hunt uses him to gain information. It is revealed that Rose is the codename for an upcoming robbery of a van carrying gold bullion masterminded by corrupt officers. After a heated argument with Drake, Hunt suspends her and confiscates her warrant card, threatening to kill her if he finds her involved in the following day's events.

During the finale, Hunt shoots Martin Summers dead in order to save Drake's life and accidentally shoots her afterward. With no witnesses, Hunt is accused of attempted murder. After being shot, Drake wakes up in the present day to be greeted by her surgeon and her daughter Molly, but observes Hunt screaming at her through hospital screens to wake up. She realises that she is now in a comatose state in 1982, and that the 2008 world she has woken into is illusory.

=== Series 3 ===
The first episode begins with Hunt emerging from hiding after shooting Alex Drake, as he was accused of attempted murder and fled to the Costa Brava and Isle of Wight for three months. After waking Drake from her comatose state, Hunt is suspended by Jim Keats (Daniel Mays), from the Discipline and Complaints Department (D&C), sent to assess Fenchurch East CID in the wake of Drake's shooting and as part of Operation Countryman. Keats unofficially assures Hunt's team that he will file a good report about them, before privately telling Hunt he intends to destroy him.

Hunt becomes frustrated with Drake over her renewed interest in Sam Tyler's death. Encouraged by Keats, Drake conducts an unofficial investigation into the events, requesting old witness statements and reports of the supposed car accident, along with the leather jacket Tyler was seen wearing during Life on Mars. Hunt soon burns the files and jacket, cryptically warning Drake to forget her search for certainty and take a leap of faith. Hunt remains unaware Drake is being haunted by a uniformed police officer with a mutilated face, and she later becomes alarmed when she finds a picture of the officer taken earlier without injuries in Hunt's desk, along with an undeveloped roll of film.

During Episode 6, Sergeant Viv James is taken hostage during a riot at HM Prison Fenchurch, having attempted to cut a deal with the riot leader to protect his incarcerated nephew. Viv is shot during the final rescue attempt and is discovered by Keats, before dying just as Gene reaches them. Hunt is devastated by the death, which casts a shadow over the team. As Drake senses their time is running out, she asks Hunt on a dinner date, in which she asks him whether he killed Sam Tyler. Hunt explains he helped Sam fake his death, but refuses to elaborate about what happened afterwards, again offering a veiled warning about faith.

The date is later interrupted by Keats, who hands Drake the photos he developed from the roll of film. Amongst several pictures of Tyler and various scenes from Life on Mars is a picture of the grave where the dead police officer haunting Drake is buried. Believing this grave to be Tyler's, a mistrustful Drake walks out on Hunt. At the same time, Shaz, Ray and Chris are confronted with visions of stars, as if looking up at the sky, and hear strange voices as described by Chris as Nelson (Tony Marshall), the publican from Life on Mars, asking him what he would like to drink.

==== Finale ====
During the last episode, Hunt is revealed to be part of a supernatural world, a form of limbo, populated by dead police officers. His role has been described as an "angel", helping the souls in a place between "earth and heaven" to get where they wanted to be. His role is to take them "to the pub" - moving on to a "heaven" beyond. It transpires that Hunt has done this for many officers before, including Sam Tyler and Annie Cartwright.

During the course of the episode each of the main characters of the show discovers they are dead, all killed while on duty. While Alex Drake recalls her past, Shaz, Ray and Chris had forgotten theirs due to the time they have spent in limbo. The uniformed officer haunting Drake is revealed to be Gene Hunt, killed as a young Constable after only a week in the force by an armed man on Coronation Day in 1953. His body is buried where Drake expects to find Tyler's body, only to discover Hunt's original warrant card, which she hands to Hunt who has followed her. According to a news broadcast Drake sees after waking from her gunshot wound operation in 2008, Hunt's undiscovered grave was recently found by a group of Travellers.

A dazed Hunt admits he had forgotten his past. Keats mysteriously appears to continue persuading Alex not to trust Hunt and drives them back in the Quattro to explain the truth to Ray, Shaz and Chris. As they enter Fenchurch, Keats attacks Hunt then gleefully smashes up their office. The ceiling disappears to reveal the same star filled universe seen by the characters previously. Keats accuses Hunt of entrapping the souls of Shaz, Chris, Ray and Alex in his fantasy, and offers them all a transfer to a wonderful new life in his own department. Chris accepts eagerly, taking Shaz and Ray along, while Alex remains with a despondent Gene Hunt. At Keat's station they wait in a lift lobby, Shaz is wary and we see a lift ominously ascending a deep shaft, the implication of a gateway to Hell with Keats as the Devil or soul-catching demon. Alex has rallied Hunt and his voice is heard over Chris' walkie-talkie, to Keat's displeasure. The team reunite for one last operation, with Shaz promoted to DCI and Ray and Chris appearing just in time to stop the villains getaway. To celebrate, despite his beloved Quattro being 'killed' in the shoot-out, Hunt announces a trip to the Pub, 'their Pub'

They arrive at an ethereal version of The Railway Arms, the favoured hangout in Life on Mars, and Landlord Nelson steps outside to welcome them. Shaz, Chris and Ray say their goodbyes then enter the Pub together with jokes and usual banter, leaving Alex who begins to realise she may also be dead, and never going home. Keats reappears and promises he can reunite her with daughter Molly in 2008, but Alex asks to see his wrist-watch which shows the time still frozen at 09:06, meaning she has died. Hunt knocks Keats down, Alex is reluctant to leave but Hunt reassures her, they kiss, and Alex steps into the Pub. Keats mocks Hunt at being left alone, malevolently snarling and barking, Hunt pushes him away and Keats retreats singing We'll Meet Again and manically laughing.

At the close the series comes full circle, referencing Life on Mars, as another police officer from the future appears like Alex and Sam, demanding to know who changed his office and where his iPhone is. Gene Hunt saunters out to greet him, using the same words he used to greet Sam Tyler in his first scene in Life on Mars.

== Lazarus ==
Gene Hunt was intended to return alongside Sam Tyler in a continuation series Lazarus, which would have taken place in modern day 2021, and also the 1970s and 1980s. Gene was originally going to appear living in the modern day and elderly, and ended up being sent back in time alongside Sam (in which Gene would have gone back to his younger age). But the project ended up being cancelled due to funding issues.

== Characterisation ==
=== Personality and appearance ===
The character of Gene Hunt is politically incorrect, having been described as an old-school copper. It is said that the character thinks of himself as the sheriff in the western movie High Noon. He can be intimidating and is often violent, while also having a bullying streak. However, he is fiercely protective of his team and "his city". This in turn inspires strong loyalty from his team members.

Philip Glenister, the actor who plays Hunt has described his character as "intuitive" and "instinctive". Glenister has also drawn similarities between Hunt and football managers José Mourinho and Brian Clough on account of his "arrogance" and way of thinking.

During Life on Mars, Hunt is described by the protagonist, Sam Tyler, as an ""overweight, over-the-hill, nicotine-stained, borderline alcoholic homophobe with a superiority complex and an unhealthy obsession with male bonding" (to which Hunt responds "You make that sound like a bad thing.") The BBC explains that in Ashes to Ashes, Hunt's personality remains unchanged, apart from him "losing grip on the power he had as a police officer".

When having just joined the police at the age of 19, Hunt is shown to be a fresh-faced young man with a slim build, and wearing a blue police tunic, a three-quarter length police trench coat, with the epaulette identity number 6620. This version of Hunt is portrayed by Mason Kayne.

The middle-aged version of Hunt that we see in Life on Mars and Ashes to Ashes is tall and strong, larger and more physically dominant than those around him, in contrast to his younger self. He is practically fearless, as shown by his dangerous driving style and his willingness (or even eagerness) to get involved in fights.

During Life on Mars, Hunt often wore a beige camel coat with a white shirt and tie, grey suit and trousers with white slip-on shoes, typical of the period. His top shirt button is always undone and his tie always hangs halfway down his chest in an untidy, dishevelled fashion. In Ashes to Ashes, he is often seen wearing a black suit, striped tie, Crombie coat and snakeskin boots. Hunt gives the impression that he wears his coat almost like a suit of armour or superhero cape.

=== Relationships ===
Gene Hunt often maintains a "love–hate relationship" with Sam Tyler and Alex Drake, the protagonists of Life on Mars and Ashes to Ashes respectively. Throughout Life on Mars, the source of disagreements between Hunt and Sam Tyler are their differing policing methods. Hunt has been described as "not being scared of throwing a few punches to get a result", whereas both Tyler and Alex Drake are present day detectives who value forensic evidence and thorough investigative techniques over pursuing hunches.

John Simm, the actor who plays Sam Tyler, has stated that both his character and Hunt have a grudging respect for the other's approach to policing, as well as Hunt seeing much of his younger self in Tyler. Hunt and Tyler's relationship eventually improves after Tyler returns to the present day only to kill himself so that he can return to save Hunt and the team, however, Hunt does not know this. During Ashes to Ashes, information about Sam Tyler can be seen on the walls of Hunt's office in Fenchurch East Police Station.

During the first series of Ashes to Ashes, Hunt's relationship with Alex Drake is much of the same as with Tyler. However, their relationship develops during the second series as they come to trust and respect each other, and they share a distinct sexual tension.

In the third series of Ashes to Ashes, Hunt and Alex's relationship becomes strained when DCI Jim Keats begins to plant seeds of doubt in Alex's mind about the nature of Sam Tyler's death, but Alex's faith and love for Gene makes her unwilling to believe that he would murder Tyler. At the end of the third series, Alex and Gene share a kiss.

Throughout both Life on Mars and Ashes to Ashes, Ray Carling and Chris Skelton are described as being "ever-faithful" to Hunt. Carling is described as Hunt's "right-hand man when it comes to fighting, shooting, gambling and the ladies". However, in Life on Mars, Carling feels threatened by Hunt and Tyler's relationship feeling "mortified that he's lost his mate and drinking partner", whereas Chris Skelton finds his loyalty "torn between Gene and Sam".

== Reception ==
Gene Hunt has been described as a "national hero" by The Independent newspaper and as a character "taken to the nation's hearts" by The Guardian. The character was voted the United Kingdom's favourite television hero in 2008, receiving over 25% of the popular vote, ahead of both 24's Jack Bauer and The Doctor. Nancy Banks-Smith stated that Hunt had been a "roaring success" in Life on Mars, with it also being said that it was because of Hunt that Life on Mars's spin-off, Ashes to Ashes, was commissioned, quoting executive producer Jane Featherstone as saying: "When Life on Mars came to end through natural causes, I think we all thought: 'Hang on, this character, Gene Hunt, is a fairly extraordinary man and we're not quite done with him yet".

Glenda Cooper, from The Daily Telegraph, called it a "crime" that John Simm received a BAFTA nomination for his portrayal of Sam Tyler, but that Glenister did not receive similar recognition for his role as Hunt. Cooper goes on to write: As far as I - and millions of British women - were concerned, the only riddle [of Life on Mars] was why the hell did anyone think this was Tyler's show when a brief psychological profile, cursory examination of the evidence and old-fashioned gut instinct showed that there was only one man in the frame and that was DCI Gene Hunt."

Ashes to Ashes reviews witnessed the character receive more negative press than those seen in Life on Mars. Caitlin Moran, reviewing the spin-off show for The Times, stated that: "We love Gene Hunt. That’s just a fact. Hunt become that rare thing, in these creatively timid and threadbare days for British drama: [However] in 200 miles, eight years and one sequel – Gene has gone from being a complex antihero to a cartoon hero."

With regards to the character's performance in Ashes to Ashes, Andrew Billen states that "much is secondhand and when Hunt, played as gleefully as ever by Philip Glenister, shouts an insult as lame as “hoity-toity poofter” you wonder if the writers should have thought again."

Hunt has also been criticised for the prejudiced views he propagates. Writing for The Times, Tim Teeman expressed concern over an episode of Ashes to Ashes which focused on overt homophobia, writing: "No doubt the justification here is that it's Gene Hunt, everyone knows he's a bigot, that's what he'd say. And he and his mates were shown to be fools. But it was said with lip-smacking relish. Gene Hunt is on the brink of becoming a kind of icon of the sniggering, unreconstructed lad." Ashley Pharoah, co-creator of both Life on Mars and Ashes to Ashes, has also voiced concern on this issue, commenting: "There have been times I have wondered: have we created a pin-up boy for the Daily Mail? That wasn't our intention."

In the lead up to the 2010 general election campaign in the UK, the ruling Labour Party produced an advert likening opposition Conservative Party leader David Cameron to Hunt, claiming that Cameron would take Britain "back to the 1980s", referencing the inequalities of that era. However, the Conservative Party claimed that comparisons to Hunt were flattering to them and produced their own advert linking Cameron to Hunt with the slogan "Fire up the Quattro, it's time for change." Subsequently, Kudos Productions, which owns the copyright to the Gene Hunt character, wrote to both parties requiring them to cease using the image.

Philip Glenister was introduced to David Cameron, then UK Conservative leader, at the 2009 Police Bravery Awards. Glenister later quipped "Six months later, he's [Cameron] on Radio 5 Live saying exactly what I've just said. B*****d nicked my line!" Glenister appeared in the 2012 stage play This House playing Labour Chief Whip from the 1970s, the late Walter Harrison.

=== Sex symbol status ===
Glenda Cooper wrote in The Daily Telegraph that "women like Hunt because he isn't a bastard - or at least not to his team. In a world of short-term contracts, job insecurity and portfolio careers, Hunt's undying loyalty to his squad (even while rabidly insulting them) make us wistful for a time gone by when you had a job (and colleagues) for life."

"On paper, it should never have happened. Hunt is Seventies man writ large and we should be grateful that species is extinct. He wears a vest and his hair looks like it was styled during a power cut. He runs along towpaths in skimpy orange swimming trunks and has a torso that's closer to a Party Seven than six pack. He has no concept of innocent until proved guilty and thinks it's acceptable to turn up to a swingers' evening with a prostitute he's just busted. He's racist, disablist and homophobic, and he calls his only female detective Flash Knickers. (And he means it as a compliment.) In fact when you see Hunt's qualities spelled out like that, it looks appalling. [However] the fact remains: Gene Hunt is my guilty secret, and I know scores of other women feel the same."

According to India Knight of The Sunday Times, the character has attained the status of an unlikely British sex symbol: "the combination of power and, shall we say, lack of political correctness can be a potent one - which is why everyone in Britain fell in love with Gene Hunt, the hulking great throwback in the BBC series Life on Mars and that men wanted to be Hunt; women wanted to be with him."

== Books ==
Bantam Press have published two books written from the in-character perspective of Hunt, being The Rules of Modern Policing (1973) in 2007 and The Future of Modern Policing (1981) in 2008. During 2009, a third book was published by Bantam written from the in-character perspective of Chris Skelton and Ray Carling, focusing on Hunt's various insults and catchphrases as seen during Life on Mars and Ashes to Ashes, called The Wit and Wisdom of Gene Hunt. An official website was also produced in order to market the third book.

== American character ==
During 2007, a television pilot for an American version of Life on Mars was filmed by 20th Century Fox Television's David E. Kelley. Actor Colm Meaney was cast as Hunt, the precinct Captain of a Los Angeles Police Department squad. Meaney had not seen the British series but bought the DVD sets at an airport after filming had been completed. The 2007–2008 Writers Guild of America strike delayed the start of the series until 2008. By then, the ABC network wanted the pilot to be reshot without Kelley's involvement. Meaney was not hired to play Hunt again; instead, Harvey Keitel assumed the role. The setting of the series was moved to New York City, and Hunt was changed to a police lieutenant, the typical rank of a NYPD detective squad's commander.
