= Mason Kayne =

English actor

- Born: James Mason; 11 June 1985 (age 40); Darlington, England, United Kingdom
- Occupation: Actor
- Years active: 2008–present

Mason Kayne (born James Mason; 11 June 1985) is an English actor. He was born in Darlington, County Durham, England

== Career ==
Kayne is best known for his role in the British television series Ashes To Ashes as Young Gene Hunt. He also appeared in a music video for the band The Futureheads for their single "Radio Heart" from their third album This Is Not The World. In October 2011 Kayne made his theatre debut in the show An Experiment with an Air Pump by Shelagh Stephenson where he was cast in the dual role of Thomas Armstrong/Phil.
