= List of Life on Mars (British TV series) episodes =

Life on Mars episodes list

Life on Mars is a British television drama series, produced by Kudos Film & Television for the BBC in 2006 and 2007. The transmission dates given below refer to the original UK showings on the BBC — for the first series in 2006 all episodes premiered on BBC One, but for the second series in 2007 two of the episodes had their first showing on the digital television channel BBC Four. For these episodes, both the BBC Four and BBC One premiere dates are given.

== Series overview ==
Series	Episodes	Originally released		Avg. UK viewers (millions)
Series	Episodes	First released	Last released	Avg. UK viewers (millions)
1	8	9 January 2006	27 February 2006	6.77
2	8	13 February 2007	10 April 2007	6.24

=== DVD releases ===
The following DVD sets have been released by Acorn Media UK.

DVD set	Episodes	Release date
Life on Mars: Series 1	8	28 July 2009
Life on Mars: Series 2	8	24 November 2009
Life on Mars: The Complete Collection	16	6 July 2010

== Episodes ==
=== Series One (2006) ===
The first series of Life On Mars focuses on Sam's life following the crash and his arrival in 1973. Elements are thrown in to variously suggest that he is mad, in a coma, or has actually travelled back in time. Also during the first series, Sam learns that he is DI (Detective Inspector) to DCI Gene Hunt and the rest of the CID department in Manchester in 1973. This revelation is something that Sam finds hard to understand; he spends most of the series working alone, against his team and Gene.

No. overall	No. in series	Title	Directed by	Written by	Original release date	UK viewers (millions)
1	1	"Episode 1"	Bharat Nalluri	Matthew Graham	9 January 2006	7.46
After a road accident in 2006, DCI Sam Tyler awakens to find himself in 1973. Apparently a DI and assigned to work under rough-around-the-edges DCI Gene Hunt, Sam follows a series of murders which have been committed with the same modus operandi in both 2006 and 1973. The clash of cultures between Sam and others relates mainly to the lack of importance placed on forensic science in 1973. WPC Annie Cartwright stops Sam jumping off the top of a building after he convinces himself that suicide will take him back to 2006.
2	2	"Episode 2"	Bharat Nalluri	Matthew Graham	16 January 2006	6.27
An armed robber, Kim Trent (Andrew Tiernan), is brought into the station in connection with a violent robbery from a local bookies; there is no evidence against him, so Gene plants false evidence on him. Sam sees this as grounds for a false conviction and allows Trent to be released without charge; Trent then goes on to commit a further armed robbery from a jewellers. This crime results in an innocent cleaning woman working in CID, June (Rafaella Hutchinson), being seriously injured. After Chris messes up forensic evidence, Sam finds new hope in solving the case with Leonard (Timothy Platt), a partially deaf street cleaner who saw the robbers without their masks. Sam tries to persuade him to testify by offering him police protection but Gene, Ray and Chris don't take the protection seriously, resulting in the lives of Annie and Leonard being at risk.
3	3	"Episode 3"	John McKay	Matthew Graham	23 January 2006	6.50
When a man is killed at a textile factory, Gene is convinced the culprit is Ted Bannister (John Henshaw), a union organiser. Gene pressures Ted into a confession which he gives to save the factory from closure. Gene is happy with the confession, but Sam pushes deeper, and discovers Ted was covering up for a fatal accident. Ted's son Derek (Andrew Knott) is found to have been planning a payroll robbery at the same firm and has stolen guns being tracked by DCI Litton. Sam tries to reason with the robbers and lets his guard down only to be saved at the last second by Gene.
4	4	"Episode 4"	John McKay	Ashley Pharoah	30 January 2006	6.64
Sam arrests Charlie Edwards (David Corden), the henchman of Stephen Warren (Tom Mannion), a local Mr. Big, when he learns the whole of CID are on Warren's payroll. Sam also visits his childhood home to interact with his mother Ruth (Joanne Froggatt), who was being threatened by the landlord, also one of Warren's men. Sam tries to help her by giving her some money and she misunderstands his gesture. When Sam tries to investigate Warren, he sets Sam up in a honey trap. Joni (Kelly Wenham), the girl involved in the honey trap sees the error of her ways only to be murdered by Warren. Gene disagrees with Ray, who says that if they don't play the game, people get hurt and helps Sam bring down Warren, putting his own guilty conscience to rest.
5	5	"Episode 5"	SJ Clarkson	Tony Jordan	6 February 2006	6.88
Manchester United fan Colin Clay is murdered and it is widely assumed that the culprit is a Manchester City fan. Sam suggests that he go undercover as a barman at the Trafford Arms pub to try to gain more information. He is assisted by Gene and Annie. The pub is frequented by a group of Manchester United supporters and it soon becomes apparent that they are planning a confrontation with Manchester City fans at the derby game to be held on the following Saturday.
6	6	"Episode 6"	John Alexander	Matthew Graham & Ashley Pharoah	13 February 2006	6.56
Reg Cole (Paul Copley), a handyman in the Manchester Gazette office takes hostages to get his life story published. Annie attempts to infiltrate the offices disguised as a nurse, but Sam and Gene are captured along with Annie. The 2 pm deadline of the hostage-taker coincides with the time of day in 2006 when Sam's life support machine will be switched off, and Sam is convinced that he must avert one death to prevent the other.
7	7	"Episode 7"	SJ Clarkson	Chris Chibnall	20 February 2006	6.49
Billy Kemble (Kevin Knapman), a young man being held for a minor drugs offence dies in custody at the station while Gene and Sam are out. While Gene tries to protect his team, Sam struggles to conduct a proper investigation into the death. After alienating all his colleagues, he is able to determine that Ray forced the suspect to take cocaine, causing a heart attack, and that the others had been covering it up. Gene furiously demotes Ray to Detective Constable.
8	8	"Episode 8"	John Alexander	Matthew Graham	27 February 2006	7.39
Sam encounters his parents Ruth and Vic Tyler (Lee Ingleby) in 1973; he believes that if he keeps his father from running away, Sam himself will awake from his apparent coma. The closer he gets to apprehending his father, the more he hears sounds which indicate he is close to waking up. Gene suspects Vic is deeply involved in crime involving hardcore pornography but Sam thinks otherwise. At the end, Gene reveals Vic is a ruthless gangster. Rather than traumatising his family more by arresting his father, he instead lets him run away. Flashbacks throughout the entire series are revealed to have been from young Sam's memories of this incident that he only now remembers.

=== Series Two (2007) ===
As noted below, episodes two and three of Series Two were shown on digital television channel BBC Four a week before they were aired on BBC One. These advance airings took place at 10pm on Tuesday 13 February 2007 and Tuesday 20 February 2007, immediately following the airing of the previous episode on BBC One.

On Tuesday 27 February 2007, episode three was preempted from its planned airing on BBC One by a football match (the unplanned-for FA Cup fifth round replay between Manchester United and Reading), and the 10pm airing on BBC Four featured a repeat of the first episode of the series. When episode three was finally aired on BBC One on Tuesday 6 March 2007, another repeated episode followed at 10pm on BBC Four.

No. overall	No. in series	Title	Directed by	Written by	Original release date	UK viewers (millions)
9	1	"Episode 1"	SJ Clarkson	Matthew Graham	13 February 2007	6.43
Sam has visions of someone disrupting his life support system in 2006, and encounters someone in 1973 whom he thinks is the same person, running a gambling syndicate and protection racket. Recognising the man, Tony Crane (Marc Warren), as a killer he failed to stop in the future, Sam is prepared to go to any lengths to make sure his life is not threatened and the man doesn't kill his original victim. Meanwhile, the department is looking for a new DC, and they can't seem to find the right man for the job. Eventually, Sam chooses who he thinks deserves the promotion for the person's help in solving the case: Annie, who becomes WDC.
10	2	"Episode 2"	SJ Clarkson	Chris Chibnall	20 February 2007	6.11
On an assignment to escort a career safe breaker nicknamed "Dicky Fingers" (Steve Evets) from prison for further questioning, Sam, Ray and Chris are attacked by robbers and the prisoner they were taking in for questioning is broken out. Retiring DCS Harry Woolf (Kevin McNally), Hunt's old friend and mentor, assists the CID and suggests investigating a local gang boss, Arnold Malone (Stephen Bent), who is his old enemy. But when they are tipped off by Malone about the next robbery to take place, they soon discover there is more to the case than meets the eye - their only clue is the name 'Harcourt'. Meanwhile, Sam tries to break in DC Glen Fletcher (Ray Emmet Brown), the first black detective in the department, a man who will later become Sam's mentor when he first joins the police force.
11	3	"Episode 3"	Richard Clark	Julie Rutterford	6 March 2007	5.23
The team receives a bomb threat, claiming the IRA has planted a car bomb in Manchester. Being from 2006, Sam realises the bomb warning reported doesn't fit with his understanding of IRA methods. However, when Sam's modern know-how fails and nearly kills Ray, the rest of the department shun his line of investigation to focus on an Irish socialist group. At the same time, Sam's visions of the future suggest that he may have suffered brain damage, affecting his higher reasoning, a result of his having been in a coma for so long.
12	4	"Episode 4"	Richard Clark	Ashley Pharoah	13 March 2007	5.32
The body of a young woman is found in wasteland. The investigation takes the team to suburbia, where local car dealer Roger Twilling (Nicholas Palliser) is throwing private parties, employing make-up girls from a local company to "help out" when the wife-swapping begins. Posing as married couple Tony and Cherie Blair, Sam and Annie infiltrate one of the parties, only to discover that it isn't as simple as they think.
13	5	"Episode 5"	Andrew Gunn	Matthew Graham	20 March 2007	6.42
The team investigates the abduction of the wife and daughter of school teacher Simon Lamb (Reece Dinsdale). The two are being held captive by someone who wishes the team to release a man for the murder of a schoolgirl a year ago. At the same time, Sam faces a life or death situation in 2007 when he thinks he has accidentally been given an overdose. As the deadline draws closer, Sam collapses into a deeper coma, leaving his colleagues to tackle the mystery on their own, though using some of his earlier suggestions. Sam and Gene realise a vital clue was overlooked in the murder investigation.
14	6	"Episode 6"	Andrew Gunn	Guy Jenkin	27 March 2007	6.56
As heroin hits the streets of Manchester for the first time, CID and DCI Hunt want culprits for the smuggling, the dealing and the ensuing violence. This becomes difficult when Annie is kidnapped by the smugglers. As Sam tries to get to the source of the influx of this deadly drug, he finds himself intractably drawn to Layla Dylan (Alex Reid), who was witness to a heroin-related shooting and who he later realises is the mother of Maya Roy (Archie Panjabi), his girlfriend in the future. At the same time, Sam's visions reveal that Maya has decided to stop visiting him in hospital, as she can't keep waiting for him to wake up.
15	7	"Episode 7"	SJ Clarkson	Mark Greig	3 April 2007	6.39
In spite of DCI Hunt's testimony, a seemingly water-tight court case fails to put away local gangster Terry Haslam (Seamus O'Neill), who is accused of breaking boxer Davie Mackay (Kieran O'Brien)'s hand. After the witness does not back his version and the defence highlight Gene's intoxication. Unable to cope, he turns to alcohol but soon finds himself in a spot of bother. When it appears as though Hunt may have killed someone, it's up to Sam, torn between Gene and his replacement, Frank Morgan (Ralph Brown), a DCI who actually uses Sam's modern police techniques and vocabulary, to help him out. Gen must evade his own colleagues to clear him.
16	8	"Episode 8"	SJ Clarkson	Matthew Graham	10 April 2007	7.44
Sam learns that an operation is to be conducted on him in the future to try to remove a tumour and revive him from his coma. He is told by Morgan that he has to remove the cancer in the police force first. Hence, to return to 2006, he has to gather incriminating evidence on Hunt in 1973. However, the lines between reality and delusion are blurred when Morgan reveals to Sam that Sam is actually undercover. During a botched sting operation, Sam returns to the future, but decides to jump off a building to return to the past again where the life and people he knows exist.
