= Episode 1 (Ashes to Ashes series 1) =

- Ashes to Ashes episode
- Episode no.: Series 1 Episode 1
- Directed by: Jonny Campbell
- Written by: Matthew Graham
- Cinematography by: Julian Court
- Editing by: Jamie Pearson
- Original air date: 7 February 2008
- Running time: 60 minutes

Episode chronology
← Previous —	Next → "Episode 2"

Episode 1 is the first episode of series 1 of the British science fiction/police procedural/drama television series Ashes to Ashes, which is the sequel to Life on Mars. It began broadcasting on BBC One on 7 February 2008.

== Synopsis ==
Ashes to Ashes tells the fictional story of Detective Inspector Alex Drake (Keeley Hawes), a police officer in service with London's Metropolitan Police. After being shot in 2008, Drake awakens in 1981.

== Plot ==
DI Alex Drake is driving her car, while her daughter Molly is reading Sam Tyler's experiences in 1973 in a Police document. It is revealed that he committed suicide. Alex gets a call that a man has taken someone hostage. She tells Molly to stay in the car.

A police sergeant informs her that the hostage taker is Arthur Layton and that he had recently left prison. Drake tries to tell the sergeant that she was driving her daughter to school. But the sergeant informs her that Layton had asked for her.

Drake approaches Layton while the armed response team arrives. She helps the hostage escape but is taken herself. Molly runs out worried for her mother. Layton takes Molly hostage and escapes. Drake gives chase and hears a bullet. Layton had disappeared and Molly was okay.

Later on Drake by herself sits in her car and repeats the lyrics "I'm happy. Hope you're happy too" that Layton had spoken earlier. Then she discovers Layton in her back seat. He orders her to relax and drive.

He leads her through the docks. He rings up an unknown person and tells them that he has Tim and Caroline Price's daughter; Drake asks Layton, "How do you know my parent's names?" But the call brings up nothing. Drake tries to question him when they are in a disused ferry on the Thames, where she is shot.

Drake sees images of the bullet and Layton, herself younger, her mum, a balloon, a clown, Layton, and the bullet. She begins to hear music ("Vienna" by Ultravox) and awakens on a brothel boat. She briskly runs off the boat as policemen rush past her. She tries to get help, believing herself to just been shot, but they believe she is a prostitute and ignore her. She makes her way to a road, where the Quattro appears speeding with music playing ("Careless Memories" by Duran Duran).

She is taken hostage by Edward Markham, when she is surprised that DCI Gene Hunt, DS Ray Carling, and DC Chris Skelton appear, looking exactly like Sam described except for the updated clothes (1980s). She convinces Markham to surrender and is taken to the Metropolitan police station, where she discovers that she has a life set up just like Sam Tyler did. She believes she is hallucinating and that everyone is just imaginary constructs. The CID and Alex Drake discover that Drake is their new DI, much to the CID's surprise (as they had thought that Drake was a prostitute). Drake finds out that the year is 1981.

Drake, believing that Layton is the key, follows evidence to convict Layton in 1981 as the CID is trying to uncover a crime gang. Layton is taken down by Hunt, much to Drake's anger, as she believes that she had to tackle Layton herself to return to the future.

== Continuity with Life on Mars ==
As with its predecessor, the show's name originates from a David Bowie song from the era in which the programme is set. In this case, it is the 1980 single "Ashes to Ashes".

In the final episode of Life on Mars, Sam Tyler is shown recording his thoughts and experiences in 2006 for an unnamed colleague in psychological services. Dropping his final tape in the post, he explains that she is studying police officers who have undergone trauma.

During the opening scenes of the first episode, it is revealed that Alex Drake is a police psychologist who has been studying Sam Tyler's suicide and the records of his life in his 1973 world. The episode begins with Alex's daughter, Molly, reading the transcription from Sam's tapes (his opening monologue from the Life on Mars episodes).

Upon Drake being shot during a hostage situation in 2008, she awakens in 1981, where she is amazed to meet Gene Hunt, who was mentioned in Sam Tyler's case notes. As Drake has read the report of Sam Tyler's reality, she knows that telephones and radios carry messages from the present day to her and how she can see hallucinations of those that she loves.

During the course of the first series, it is revealed that Sam Tyler returned to Manchester in 1973 after committing suicide in 2006. Tyler spent a further seven years in this alternate timeline, before crashing his car while pursuing robbery suspects, with his body never being recovered.

The 2nd-through-final episodes' opening credits begin with an explanatory monologue by Alex, closely following that of Sam on Life on Mars.

The first season of each series repeatedly features fractured memories of the murder of a woman each protagonist witnessed his or her father commit when the protagonist was a child. Sam's memories, from 1973, are shown as grainy film; Alex's, from 1981, are depicted as home video complete with whirling sound of a VCR fast-forwarding and reversing the tape. Sam and Alex each re-live the scene as adults at the climax of the first-season finale.

In addition to DCI Gene Hunt, DS Ray Carling, and DC Chris Skelton being regulars on both series, other Life on Mars characters Nelson, Jackie Queen, and DCI Derek Litton make guest appearances. Sam and his widow, DC Annie Cartwright, are repeatedly referred to.

Sam and Alex each meet their respective parents and visit their own childhood homes and bedrooms. They both encounter other family and significant places, such as Sam's favourite aunt, the record store where he bought his first record, and the factory that will one day be the loft where he will live as a DCI; and Alex's foster father, future ex-husband, parents-in-law, and the bed on which she implies her younger self will be intimate.

== Cast ==
- Philip Glenister as Detective Chief Inspector Gene Hunt
- Keeley Hawes as Detective Inspector Alex Drake
- Dean Andrews as Detective Seargent Ray Carling
- Marshall Lancaster as Detective Constable Chris Skelton
- Montserrat Lombard as Woman Police Constable Sharon Granger
- Joseph Long as Luigi
- Geff Francis as Desk Sergeant Viv James
- Amelia Bullmore as Caroline Price
- Grace Vance as Molly Drake
- Stephen Campbell Moore as Evan White
- Andrew Clover as The Clown
- Sean Harris as Arthur Layton
- Lucy Cole as Young Alex Drake
- Adam James as Edward Markham
- Darren Machin as Jimmy
- Max Dowler as Police Sergeant
- Roy Skelton as Zippy and George (voice)

== Cultural references ==
There is an entire scene with the children's characters Zippy and George (from Rainbow) talking to Molly Drake.

The Clown Angel of Death's pierrot costume is modeled on David Bowie's costume in the music video and record jacket of "Ashes to Ashes".

Chris Skelton (Marshall Lancaster) and others sing "Shaddap You Face" by Joe Dolce, a 1981 novelty hit which parodies Italian English.

The scene where Alex Drake first meets Gene Hunt has a shot framing Hunt between Alex's legs. This is a reference to the promotional poster for the 1981 James Bond film For Your Eyes Only. The poster is seen later on the wall of Hunt's office.

The boat on which Alex awakens in the middle of a party is named Lady Di, according to the large name plaque she passes topside, and PS Viv James informs Gene by radio that Arthur Layton has a boat named Prince Charlie. The episode takes place in July 1981, days prior to the 29 July 1981 wedding of Lady Diana Spencer to Prince Charles, which serves as a backdrop for the following episode.

== Music ==
Music featured in the episode includes :

- "Ashes to Ashes" – David Bowie
- "Are 'Friends' Electric?" – Tubeway Army
- "Vienna" – Ultravox
- "Same Old Scene" – Roxy Music
- "No More Heroes" – The Stranglers
- "I Fought The Law" – The Clash
- "I'm in Love with a German Film Star" – The Passions
- "Careless Memories" – Duran Duran
- "Same Old Scene" – Roxy Music
- "Shaddap You Face" – Joe Dolce (performed by Marshall Lancaster, et al.)
