= Episode 2 (Ashes to Ashes series 1) =

- Ashes to Ashes episode
- Episode no.: Series 1 Episode 2
- Directed by: Jonny Campbell
- Written by: Ashley Pharoah
- Cinematography by: Julian Court
- Editing by: Jamie Pearson
- Original air date: 14 February 2008
- Running time: 60 minutes

Episode chronology
← Previous "Episode 1"	Next → "Episode 3"

"Episode 2" is the second episode of series 1 of the British science fiction/police procedural drama television series Ashes to Ashes, which is the sequel to Life on Mars. It began broadcasting on BBC One on 14 February 2008.

== Synopsis ==
As the royal wedding of Prince Charles and Lady Di approaches, Hunt is determined to keep a protest about the Docklands redevelopment under control. Meanwhile, a DeLorean-driving playboy attracts Alex's attention and Danny comes up with the goods on a New Romantic night out. Guest starring Rupert Graves and Steve Strange.

== Plot ==
Alex is watching television when she sees her mum on the TV talking about a case she has done. All the officers are on high alert as Prince Charles and Lady Di are to be married in a couple of days. Gene and Alex go to talk to David Bonds who is protesting in his pub on the refurbishment of the East End. He agrees to not cause any trouble until after the royal wedding. Gene tries to force Alex to have her bottom stamped as property of the station, an apparent tradition in the Metropolitan Police where the male officers moon her afterward. Alex refuses. A message comes in from an apparent bomber after a stray dog is blown up by dynamite. The message says that 'next time it's moore' and although everyone else assumes it to be a spelling mistake, Alex notices the note's perfect grammar and says if they can get that right then they can spell correctly. Chris says Moore might refer to Bobby Moore but is dismissed. Shaz suggests Daniel Moore, a man who is redeveloping parts of the East End. Hunt assigns Chris to find which magazines the letters in the note came from.

Gene and Alex go to visit Moore who declines their offer of protection. Alex is immediately attracted to him. Back at CID, Chris has found the source of all the letters except the O's. Moore appears at the station and takes Alex for a drive in his De Lorean. When they park, Alex says she hears a ticking sound and they both struggle to get out of the locked car. The bomb turns out to be a fake to scare Danny and asks if the offer of protection still stands. Alex is visibly shaken by the fake bomb. Gene sends Alex home saying she is no good to them being in the state she's in. At a restaurant Alex asks if Danny will be able to surprise her and he takes her to the Blitz, a famous London nightclub of the era. They meet Shaz and Chris there and Alex is having a great time. She sees the Clown on the stage and follows him only to find him gone. The next day Alex tells Gene she recognises the weird 'O's in the letter and that they were on the shirt of Bonds' son. Gene is reluctant to bring the boy in until Alex agrees to let him stamp her bottom. He is arrested and questioned but doesn't say anything. Whilst Gene is trying to stamp Alex, the Bonds' representative arrives: Caroline Price, Alex's mother.

Chris comes back from Bonds' pub with another stick of dynamite and they question George again with Price in the room. The suspect is charged and Caroline asks Alex for a drink. She asks Alex to spy on her fellow male workers and when she refuses Caroline says she's glad the only thing Alex shares with her daughter is her name because she would be ashamed to have Alex as a daughter. In revenge, Alex goes to sleep with Danny but when reaching his office discovers him having sex with someone else. Gene suspects that George's father, David Bonds, is the actual bomber and brings him in for questioning. George confesses to protect his father. As George is being booked, Hunt pulls out a plastic bag and tosses it to Mrs Bonds and Mr. Bonds ducks under a desk thinking it to contain dynamite. Mr. Bonds was the actual bomber (having previously been an explosive expert serving in North Africa during the Second World War). At Danny's party to celebrate the wedding, however, Alex notices Bonds' son acting suspiciously. Alex and Gene shout to everyone to run and Bonds shouts "we are all prostitutes", a reference to his favorite song by The Pop Group, before blowing himself up. Caroline comes to apologise to Alex for misjudging George's character and then announces she is going to spend time with her daughter. Alex looks out to see Gene and the rest of the squad mooning her as part of the deal.

== Cast ==
Main

- Philip Glenister (Gene Hunt)
- Keeley Hawes (Alex Drake)
- Dean Andrews (Ray Carling)
- Marshall Lancaster (Chris Skelton)
- Montserrat Lombard (Sharon Granger)

Guests

- Amelia Bullmore (Caroline Price)
- Stephen Campbell Moore (Evan White)
- Joseph Long (Luigi)
- Geff Francis (Viv James)
- Andrew Clover (The Clown)
- Grace Vance (Molly Drake)
- Rupert Graves (Danny Moore)
- Christopher Fairbank (David Bonds)
- Stephen Wight (George Bonds)
- Amelda Brown (Elaine Bonds)
- Lucy Cole (Young Alex)
- Nick Howden (Scared youth)
- Nicky Lilley (Lady Diana Spencer)
- Steve Strange (As himself)
- Lee Jason Simeone (Dancer / club regular)
- Sandrine Gourrow (As herself)
- Zippy – Ronnie Le Drew (voiced by Roy Skelton)

== Music ==
Music featured in the episode includes:

"Swords of a Thousand Men" – Tenpole Tudor

"The Prince" – Madness

"Body Talk" – Imagination

"Money (That's What I Want)" – The Flying Lizards

"Planet Earth" – Duran Duran

Happy Birthday – Altered Images

"Fade to Grey" – Visage – Steve Strange appears in this episode playing himself performing the number on stage at The Blitz

"Souvenir" – Orchestral Manoeuvres in the Dark

"We Are All Prostitutes" – The Pop Group

"(We Don't Need This) Fascist Groove Thang" – Heaven 17

"I Hear You Now" – Jon and Vangelis

"Geno" – Dexys Midnight Runners

"Gertcha" – Chas & Dave
