= Left of the Dial: Dispatches from the '80s Underground =

Compilation album by various artists
- Released: October 5, 2004
- Genre: Alternative rock
- Label: Rhino

Professional ratings
Aggregate scores
Source	Rating
Metacritic	85/100
Review scores
Source	Rating
AllMusic	4.5/5 stars
The Austin Chronicle	4/5 stars
Blender	4/5 stars
E!	B+
Entertainment Weekly	A−
Pitchfork	8.3/10
Rolling Stone	4/5 stars
Stylus	A
Uncut	3/5 stars

Left of the Dial: Dispatches from the '80s Underground is a four-disc alternative rock compilation album released by Rhino Records in 2004. Chris Dahlen of Pitchfork notes that "the mandate of Left of the Dial — to showcase anything that fit on college radio in the 80s — means you'll find everything from punk and post-punk to synth-pop and dream-pop". The term "left of the dial", taken from a Replacements song (that does not appear in this collection), refers to the college and other non-commercial FM radio stations in the U.S., with frequencies typically in the reserved band on the left (i.e., lower) end of the FM broadcast band of the radio spectrum.

== Track listing ==
Disc one
No.	Title	Artist	Length
1.	"Radio Free Europe" (from Murmur, 1983)	R.E.M.	4:06
2.	"Going Underground" (1980 single)	The Jam	2:56
3.	"A Forest" (from Seventeen Seconds, 1980)	The Cure	4:55
4.	"Holiday in Cambodia" (from Fresh Fruit for Rotting Vegetables, 1980)	Dead Kennedys	4:39
5.	"I'm in Love with a German Film Star" (from Thirty Thousand Feet Over China, 1981)	The Passions	4:01
6.	"I Will Dare" (from Let It Be, 1984)	The Replacements	3:19
7.	"That's When I Reach for My Revolver" (from Signals, Calls, and Marches, 1981)	Mission of Burma	3:53
8.	"Johnny Hit and Run Paulene" (from Los Angeles, 1980)	X	2:50
9.	"Just Like Honey" (from Psychocandy, 1985)	The Jesus and Mary Chain	3:02
10.	"Black Celebration" (from Black Celebration, 1986)	Depeche Mode	4:53
11.	"Tell Me When It's Over" (from The Days of Wine and Roses, 1982)	The Dream Syndicate	3:33
12.	"Hollywood (Africa)" (from Freaky Styley, 1985)	Red Hot Chili Peppers	5:03
13.	"Temptation" (from Substance, 1987)	New Order	5:44
14.	"Ghosts" (from Tin Drum, 1981)	Japan	4:32
15.	"A Song from Under the Floorboards" (from The Correct Use of Soap, 1980)	Magazine	4:11
16.	"Oblivious" (from High Land, Hard Rain, 1983)	Aztec Camera	3:12
17.	"Don't Want to Know If You Are Lonely" (from Candy Apple Grey, 1986)	Hüsker Dü	3:32
18.	"Rise Above" (from Damaged, 1981)	Black Flag	2:26
19.	"Back in Flesh" (from Dark Continent, 1981)	Wall of Voodoo	3:43
20.	"Cattle and Cane" (from Before Hollywood, 1983)	The Go-Betweens	4:01

Disc two
No.	Title	Artist	Length
1.	"Message of Love" (from Pretenders II, 1981)	The Pretenders	3:26
2.	"Vienna" (from Vienna, 1981)	Ultravox	4:40
3.	"Freak Scene" (from Bug, 1988)	Dinosaur Jr.	3:37
4.	"This Charming Man" (1983 single)	The Smiths	2:44
5.	"Stigmata" (from The Land of Rape and Honey, 1988)	Ministry	5:45
6.	"Ways to Be Wicked" (from Lone Justice, 1985)	Lone Justice	3:26
7.	"Wardance" (from Killing Joke, 1980)	Killing Joke	3:47
8.	"Enola Gay" (from Organisation, 1980)	Orchestral Manoeuvres in the Dark	3:32
9.	"Mirror in the Bathroom" (from I Just Can't Stop It, 1980)	The English Beat	3:08
10.	"Fairytale in the Supermarket" (from The Raincoats, 1979)	The Raincoats	3:00
11.	"Behind the Wall of Sleep" (from Especially for You, 1986)	The Smithereens	3:24
12.	"Political Song for Michael Jackson to Sing" (from Double Nickels on the Dime, 1984)	Minutemen	1:32
13.	"Punk Rock Girl" (from Beelzebubba, 1988)	The Dead Milkmen	2:39
14.	"Still in Hollywood" (from Concrete Blonde, 1986)	Concrete Blonde	3:45
15.	"Love Will Tear Us Apart" (1980 single)	Joy Division	3:27
16.	"Blister in the Sun" (from Violent Femmes, 1982)	Violent Femmes	2:26
17.	"Lake of Fire" (from Meat Puppets II, 1984)	Meat Puppets	2:00
18.	"Amplifier" (from Repercussion, 1981)	The dB's	3:08
19.	"When Love Breaks Down" (from Steve McQueen, 1985)	Prefab Sprout	3:46
20.	"Goo Goo Muck" (from Psychedelic Jungle, 1981)	The Cramps	3:07
21.	"This Corrosion" (from Floodland, 1987)	The Sisters of Mercy	4:29
22.	"Senses Working Overtime" (from English Settlement, 1982)	XTC	4:36

Disc three
No.	Title	Artist	Length
1.	"The Cutter" (from Porcupine, 1983)	Echo & the Bunnymen	3:55
2.	"Pay to Cum" (1980 single)	Bad Brains	1:28
3.	"Birthday" (from Life's Too Good, 1988)	The Sugarcubes	3:59
4.	"Madonna of the Wasps" (from Queen Elvis, 1989)	Robyn Hitchcock and the Egyptians	3:07
5.	"We Care a Lot" (from Introduce Yourself, 1987)	Faith No More	4:05
6.	"Teen Age Riot" (from Daydream Nation, 1988)	Sonic Youth	6:58
7.	"To Hell with Poverty" (from Another Day/Another Dollar, 1982)	Gang of Four	3:28
8.	"Fa Cé-La" (from Crazy Rhythms, 1980)	The Feelies	2:03
9.	"Ana Ng" (from Lincoln, 1988)	They Might Be Giants	3:21
10.	"Swamp Thing" (from Strange Times, 1986)	The Chameleons UK	6:00
11.	"The Mercy Seat" (from Tender Prey, 1988)	Nick Cave and the Bad Seeds	5:12
12.	"I Look Around" (from Emergency Third Rail Power Trip, 1983)	Rain Parade	3:07
13.	"All That Money Wants" (from All of This and Nothing, 1988)	The Psychedelic Furs	3:52
14.	"Under the Milky Way" (from Starfish, 1988)	The Church	4:59
15.	"Rise" (Bob Clearmountain mix, from Album, 1986)	Public Image Ltd.	6:08
16.	"Kundalini Express" (from Express, 1986)	Love and Rockets	5:51
17.	"Gravity Talks" (from Gravity Talks, 1983)	Green on Red	2:34
18.	"Adrenalin" (1980 single)	Throbbing Gristle	3:58
19.	"She Bangs the Drums" (single version, from The Stone Roses, 1989)	The Stone Roses	3:45

Disc four
No.	Title	Artist	Length
1.	"Monkey Gone to Heaven" (from Doolittle, 1989)	Pixies	2:56
2.	"Uncertain Smile" (single version, from Soul Mining, 1983)	The The	4:54
3.	"Bela Lugosi's Dead" (1979 single)	Bauhaus	9:34
4.	"Christine" (from Kaleidoscope, 1980)	Siouxsie and the Banshees	2:59
5.	"Straight Edge" (from Minor Threat, 1981)	Minor Threat	0:46
6.	"Help You Ann" (from On Fyre, 1984)	Lyres	2:30
7.	"Our Secret" (from Beat Happening, 1985)	Beat Happening	2:48
8.	"Jane Says" (from Nothing's Shocking, 1988)	Jane's Addiction	4:53
9.	"World Shut Your Mouth" (from Saint Julian, 1987)	Julian Cope	3:34
10.	"Running Up That Hill" (from Hounds of Love, 1985)	Kate Bush	5:00
11.	"Sex Beat" (from Fire of Love, 1981)	The Gun Club	2:48
12.	"Take the Skinheads Bowling" (from Telephone Free Landslide Victory, 1985)	Camper Van Beethoven	2:30
13.	"Institutionalized" (from Suicidal Tendencies, 1983)	Suicidal Tendencies	3:49
14.	"Pearly-Dewdrops' Drops" (from The Spangle Maker, 1984)	Cocteau Twins	4:11
15.	"24 Hour Party People" (from Squirrel and G-Man Twenty Four Hour Party People Plastic Face Carnt Smile (White Out), 1987)	Happy Mondays	4:38
16.	"I Want You Back" (from Stoneage Romeos, 1984)	Hoodoo Gurus	3:11
17.	"Suburban Home" (from Milo Goes to College, 1982)	Descendents	1:42
18.	"A Pair of Brown Eyes" (from Rum Sodomy & the Lash, 1985)	The Pogues	4:53
19.	"Jet Fighter" (from Sixteen Tambourines, 1983)	The Three O'Clock	3:27
20.	"Moving to Florida" (from Cream Corn from the Socket of Davis, 1985)	Butthole Surfers	4:31
21.	"A New England" (from Life's a Riot with Spy vs Spy, 1983)	Billy Bragg	2:13
