= Michael & Miranda =

Studio album by the Passions
- Released: 18 April 1980
- Studio: Morgan Studios, London
- Genre: Post-punk; new wave
- Length: 34:22
- Label: Fiction
- Producer: Chris Parry

The Passions chronology
Michael & Miranda (1980)	Thirty Thousand Feet Over China (1981)

Professional ratings
Review scores
Source	Rating
AllMusic	2.5/5 stars

Michael & Miranda is the debut album by English post-punk/new wave band the Passions, released on 18 April 1980 by Fiction Records.

The album was reviewed by Louder Than War where reviewer Ian Canty stated "Think you've heard the best sounds of 1980 Post Punk has to offer - if you haven't heard this think again". Record Collector magazine reviewed the album stating "Sparse and jagged, topped with sometimes angry, sometimes hauntingly ethereal vocals, it was typically and satisfyingly clever post-punk". Goldmine in January 2016 recommended as Buy in their Quick Picks section.

== Track listing ==
All tracks are written by The Passions.

Side one
No.	Title	Length
1.	"Pedal Fury"	2:09
2.	"Oh No, It's You"	4:29
3.	"Snow"	2:31
4.	"Love Song"	2:37
5.	"Man on the Tube"	3:54
6.	"Miranda"	1:12

Side two
No.	Title	Length
1.	"Obsession"	3:37
2.	"Suspicion"	2:36
3.	"Palava"	2:06
4.	"Absentee"	3:18
5.	"Brick Wall"	2:39
6.	"Why Me"	3:14
Total length:		34:22

== Personnel ==
Credits adapted from LP liner notes.

The Passions

- Barbara Gogan – vocals, guitar, piano
- Claire Bidwell – vocals, bass
- Clive Timperley – vocals, guitar, keyboards, violin, marimba
- Richard Williams – drums, percussion

Technical

- Mike Hedges, Michael J. Dutton – engineers
- Mark Freegard – assistant engineer
- Mike Laye – photography
