= Left of the Dial =

Left of the dial refers to the college and other non-commercial radio stations in the United States that broadcast from the reserved band of the FM spectrum. It can also refer to:

- "Left of the Dial" (song), a song from the 1985 album Tim by The Replacements that popularized the term
- Left of the Dial: Dispatches from the '80s Underground, a 2004 American compilation album of 1980s music
- "Left of the Dial", programme six of the 2007 BBC Two television series Seven Ages of Rock
- Left of the Dial, a 2005 HBO documentary about the founding of Air America
- Left of the Dial is the 6th episode of the 2009 ABC TV series Cupid, which was a revival of the previous 1998 ABC TV series Cupid
- Left of the Dial is a Portland cover band, devoted to music popularized by 1980s college radio stations.
