= Sanctuary (The Passions album) =

Studio album by The Passions
- Released: 18 September 1982
- Studio: The Garden (London)
- Genre: New wave
- Label: Polydor
- Producer: Mick Glossop, Pete Wilson

The Passions chronology
Thirty Thousand Feet Over China (1981)	Sanctuary (1982)

Professional ratings
Review scores
Source	Rating
AllMusic	3/5 stars

Sanctuary is the third and last album by English post-punk/new wave band the Passions, released on 18 September 1982 by Polydor Records.

The album was originally called Cars Driven Fast after the song on the album and artwork had been designed for it. However, the name was changed after the involvement of Cairo Management. The original title and artwork was used in some areas of Europe.

== Track listing ==
All tracks are written by the Passions, except "Love Is Essential," written by Kevin Armstrong.

Side one
No.	Title	Length
1.	"Jump for Joy"	4:00
2.	"The Letter"	3:26
3.	"Into Night"	4:45
4.	"Small Talk"	4:05
5.	"White Lies"	3:15

Side two
No.	Title	Length
1.	"Cars Driven Fast"	4:51
2.	"Love Is Essential"	3:25
3.	"Your Friend"	3:33
4.	"Hold On Don't Go"	3:17
5.	"Sanctuary"	5:47

== Personnel ==
Credits adapted from LP liner notes.

The Passions

- Barbara Gogan – vocals, guitar
- Dave Agar – bass guitar, vocals
- Richard Williams – drums
- Kevin Armstrong – guitar, vocals
- Jeff Smith – synthesisers

Technical

- Mick Glossop – producer (2–10), engineer, remixing (1)
- Pete Wilson – producer (1)
- Corinne Simcock – assistant engineer
- Colin Leggett – assistant engineer
- Pyramid Graphics – artwork
- Chris Hopper – photography
