= Funeral Oration (band) =

Dutch melodic hardcore punk band

- Also known as: Art Protexion
- Genres: Melodic hardcore; hardcore punk; punk rock
- Years active: 1982–1999
- Past members: Peter Zirschky; Ferry Fidom; Mike de Veer; William Steinhäuser

Funeral Oration was a melodic hardcore punk band from Amsterdam, Netherlands. They were active from 1982–83 until the end of the 1990s, putting out highly influential records on Dutch, German, British and American labels. Their singer was Peter Zirschky.

After listening to punk rock for a couple of years, Peter Zirschky decided to start a punk band. It was 1980 and they called themselves Art Protexion, probably because Zirschky's favourite band at the time was The Art Attacks. Drummer Ferry Fidom and bassplayer Mike de Veer joined him a year later in Last Warning. They soon changed their name to Funeral Oration, with no thought behind that, but broke up two months later.

In 1983, Zirschky placed an ad in the Dutch punk magazine Koekrand, saying: "Need a bassplayer, don't have to be good, but has to be pretty fast", recruiting William Steinhäuser to play the bass and forming the core of the revived Funeral Oration. The band went on to release numerous EPs, two cassette-only albums and 7 full-length LPs, the pinnacle of which was their debut album "Communion" (1985), and also toured the States three times during the 90s.

== Discography ==
=== Demos ===
- There's Nothing Left To Laugh About cassette (self-released, 1983)
- The Godsend cassette (self-released, 1984)

=== EPs ===
- Shadowland 12" (self-released, 1984)
- Survival 7" (Remedy, 1986)
- The More We Know 7" (Loony Tunes, 1989)
- What Is It? 7" (Hopeless, 1995)
- Stop For A Moment/Expanding 7" flexi (Hopeless/Flipside, 1995)

=== Albums ===
- Communion LP (Diehard, 1985)
- Funeral Oration LP (Swaddle, 1987)
- Say No To Life LP (WRF, 1993 /recorded in 1989/)
- Punk Rock Nation CD (WRF, 1994)
- Funeral Oration CD/LP/cass (Hopeless, 1995)
- Believer CD/LP/cass (Hopeless, 1997)
- Survival CD/LP/cass (Hopeless, 1998)
- Discography 1983 – 1998 2CD (Hopeless, 1999)

=== Reissues ===
- Communion LP (Weckewerk, 1989)
- Communion/Shadowland CD (Nasty Vinyl, 1997)
- The Godsend LP (Neder Again Records, 2008 /bootleg/)
- The Godsend LP (Pain Of Mind/Gummopunx Records, 2011)

=== Compilations ===
- Raw War tape (Xcentric Noise, 1983)
- Holland Hardcore 2nd Attack tape (Er Is Hoop, 1984)
- Funeral Oration/Gepøpel split tape (BCT, 1985)
- I've Got An Attitude Problem EP (BCT/Loony Tunes, 1987)
- Remedy Records sampler 4-way split LP (Remedy, 1988)
- Welcome To Our Scene LP (WRF, 1990)
- Punk SucksCD (Liberation Records, 1996)
- Chicago vs. Amsterdam CD/EP (Hopeless, 1996)
- Hopelessly Devoted To You CD (Hopeless, 1996)
- Hopelessly Devoted To You Too CD (Hopeless, 1998)
- Take Action! CD (Sub City Records, 1999)
- Hopelessly Devoted To You, vol. 3 CD (Hopeless, 2000)
- Holland Hardcore 2nd Attack Double LP (Abuse Records, Hand numbered and Limited to 1000)
