= List of Ashes to Ashes episodes =

Ashes to Ashes is a British science fiction/police procedural drama television series, serving as a spin-off from the original series, Life on Mars.

The transmission dates given below refer to the original British broadcast on BBC One.

== Series overview ==
Series	Episodes	Originally released		Avg. UK viewers (millions)
Series	Episodes	First released	Last released	Avg. UK viewers (millions)
1	8	7 February 2008	27 March 2008	6.60
2	8	20 April 2009	8 June 2009	6.51
3	8	2 April 2010	21 May 2010	6.13

== Episodes ==
=== Season 1 (2008) ===
No. overall	No. in season	Title	Directed by	Written by	Original release date	Viewers (millions)
1	1	"Episode 1"	Jonny Campbell	Matthew Graham	7 February 2008	8.04
In 2008, Detective Inspector Alex Drake is taking her daughter to school, when a situation leads to her being shot by ex-criminal mastermind Arthur Layton. Awakening moments later in 1981, Alex finds herself experiencing the same situation as DCI Sam Tyler - who died a year ago from apparent suicide - when she encounters DCI Gene Hunt, DC Ray Carling, and DC Chris Skelton, all of whom work at Fenchurch East Police Station. Believing her best chance of returning to the present is through Layton, Alex works to convince Gene to help her stop him, all the while finding herself being haunted by a mysterious man dressed up as a clown like that from the video to the David Bowie song "Ashes to Ashes".
2	2	"Episode 2"	Jonny Campbell	Ashley Pharoah	14 February 2008	6.99
Alex finds she is stuck in 1981 and has little choice but to adapt to the situation, as Fenchurch East CID comes under pressure to ensure London is safe for the upcoming wedding of Prince Charles and Lady Diana Spencer. However, Gene is concerned about a spate of anti-Docklands redevelopment protests, after a cache of explosives leads him to suspect something more sinister is set to happen. But for Alex, things get weirder when she has a run in with her mother, Caroline Price, and begins to believe their encounter could be a sign of how she can return home to her daughter and 2008. Guest Stars: Rupert Graves and Steve Strange.
3	3	"Episode 3"	Bille Eltringham	Julie Rutterford	21 February 2008	6.72
Alex is disgusted when no-one in Fenchurch East CID will take a prostitute's allegations of rape seriously enough, especially when the woman was attacked at knife point. While Gene is skeptical of the claims, he later begins to listen, as his team discover the alleged rape could involve someone who killed a woman and assaulted another. To uncover the truth, Gene orders his team to go undercover to infiltrate a fancy dress boat party to track down the suspect, despite problems with the witness statements and the suspect's background, though Alex faces issues over her own judgement and a meeting with someone from her future.
4	4	"Episode 4"	Catherine Morshead	Mark Greig	28 February 2008	6.63
The body of Martin Kennedy, a nuclear research centre worker who was recently murdered, disappears from the morgue. Alex suspects a cover-up as the centre was the subject of public protests concerning the site's work, believing the government wants to avoid its exposure. But Gene is convinced the motive is something much simpler, as Alex's mother Caroline had connections to the victim. This theory soon becomes more possible when the investigation reveals Kennedy was blackmailing Caroline, leading Alex to work to figure out if her mother really had any involvement in the murder.
5	5	"Episode 5"	Bille Eltringham	Mark Greig	6 March 2008	6.38
Gene has his team focus their attention on Simon Neary, a pimp and drug dealer, who is due to receive guns from a Russian mobster. Alex realizes the deal will include the gun that Layton will shoot her with, and works to help prevent the deal in order to change her fate. But when an informant who supplied Gene information on the deal is found dead, Alex attempts to convince Neary's boyfriend, Marcus Johnstone, to help the police investigation on Neary. Even though she assumes its the right course of action, her efforts to have Marcus aid them lead Alex to consult her mother over whether doing so is ethical. Guest Star: Russell Tovey.
6	6	"Episode 6"	Catherine Morshead	Mick Ford	13 March 2008	5.94
Following an armed robbery at a local post office that involved two men, Gene notes the methods use match that to a criminal he dealt with in Manchester - Chas Dale. However, when Chas is confronted at his new address in London, Gene begins to doubt his instincts after Chas reveals he has an alibi for the crime. As Ray and Chris go undercover to track down the second suspect, Alex looks into Gene's original theory, only to wind up being captured, tied up and gagged, and left to die in an industrial freezer. Fearful of dying in 1981, she begins to hope Gene will be strong enough to rescue her and capture the culprit. Guest Stars: Phil Davis and Asa Butterfield.
7	7	"Episode 7"	Jonny Campbell	Matthew Graham	20 March 2008	5.89
On the way to the bank, Gil Hollis, a charity fundraiser, has thousands of pounds of charity money stolen from them. Alex, convinced he knows more about the crime, decides to hold a TV appeal for information from any potential witnesses. However, the appeal goes badly wrong, with Gene opting for his more preferred approach of investigating. When Hollis' story soon doesn't add up, Gene locks him up on suspicion of being involved, but his actions lead to him being put on leave, with Alex taking charge of the team to get to the truth of the robbery. Guest Star: Matthew Macfadyen. Notes: The episode features brief cameo appearances by Shaw Taylor, Roger De Courcey and Nookie. In addition, a recording of Sir Terry Wogan was also used in the story.
8	8	"Episode 8"	Jonny Campbell	Ashley Pharoah	27 March 2008	6.23
Finding herself facing the day her parents died in a car bombing, Alex works to prevent this from happening, believing doing so will allow her to return to 2008. At the same time, Gene is concerned about an upcoming inspection of Fenchurch East. When he decides to empty the cells of prisoners, Alex is horrified that her parents, who she had arrested on drug offences, were released alongside one other - Arthur Layton - leading to her uncovering the truth behind what really happened, and to the origins of the clown she has been seeing since she arrived in 1981. Guest Star: Geoffrey Palmer.

=== Season 2 (2009) ===
The second season, set in 1982, was confirmed to be in production in early 2008.

No. overall	No. in season	Title	Directed by	Written by	Original release date	Viewers (millions)
9	1	"Episode 1"	Catherine Morshead	Ashley Pharoah	20 April 2009	7.91
Gene finds his team under the supervision of Superintendent Charlie Mackintosh, as they investigates the murder of Sean Irvine, a police officer found dead in a strip club. Irvine's partner Kevin Hale is torn up by the incident, but the team find evidence suggesting Hale was involved in corruption, despite Irvine's wife being involved in an affair with Mackintosh. Alex begins to suspect someone has found her body in 2008, and begins receiving roses from an unknown source. Chris works to enter a relationship with WPC Shaz Granger by making amends to her for his behaviour towards women.
10	2	"Episode 2"	Catherine Morshead	Matthew Graham	27 April 2009	6.59
Gene inadvertently causes the death of Jed Wicklow, a gypsy suspected of car theft, during a high speed car chase. Alex is deeply suspicious when Mackintosh clears him of any wrong-doing, despite Wicklow's body being found to be carrying illegal drugs. As the gypsy community he came from comes under investigation for the drugs, Alex is concerned over why Gene was protected, and follows him to a masonic lodge he is planning to join. To her surprise, she finds he is investigating Mackintosh, after Alex raised concerns over Irvine's murder after Hale did not openly confess to the crime.
11	3	"Episode 3"	Ben Bolt	Nicole Taylor	4 May 2009	6.32
A radical animal rights group threaten bomb attacks across London, unless support for a new government bill on vivisection is dropped. After the daughter of the owner of an animal experimentation laboratory is injured in a bomb attack, Fenchurch East CID draw a connection to a similar attack in 1975, despite the fact the culprit was sent to prison. Alex discovers Hale died in prison from apparent suicide, but Gene is not convinced, and finds Mackintosh is highly obstructive to further investigation in Irvine's murder, to the point that he makes plans to send the DCI to the furthest point in England.
12	4	"Episode 4"	Ben Bolt	Ashley Pharoah	11 May 2009	6.18
Gene is shocked when journalist Jackie Queen, a former girlfriend, travels down from Manchester, seeking to track down her niece. Queen reveals her niece was one of several teenagers who ran away and have been missing since, but that Mackintosh blocked any attempts to investigate. Seeking answers, Gene has his team investigate regardless of the Superintendent's efforts to stop it, discovering the missing teenagers were drawn in by photographer Ralph Jarvis. Alex soon discovers Mackintosh and Jarvis know each other, but faces issues proving Jarvis is kidnapping the teenagers when she is threatened with charges.
13	5	"Episode 5"	Philip John	Julie Rutterford	18 May 2009	6.32
Fenchurch East CID investigate a violent robbery at the home of 14-year-old Peter Drake, Alex's future husband. Gene is not convinced to investigate a matter he considers trivial, until fingerprints found at the house are linked to George Staines, a notorious gangster who is supposed to be dead. Gene leads the investigation, believing its resolution could be the means to bury the press stories concerning police corruption in Fenchurch East. Meanwhile, Alex meets the mysterious sender of roses she has gotten, Martin Summers, who she finds to be a rogue police officer from the 2000s.
14	6	"Episode 6"	Philip John	Jack Lothian	25 May 2009	5.15
Gene's team investigates the murder of Colin Mitchell, after his body was found floating in a canal. Mitchell's father claims a local loan shark, Trever Riley, was responsible, leading Gene to focus his attention upon him. However, evidence begins to show signs someone else was involved and that Riley is being framed, despite the actions he takes to impede the investigation. Alex begins seeing signs she has survived an operation to save her life, but faces questions on her chance of recovering and Summers efforts to corrupt her. Shaz and Chris overcome an argument in their relationship in hopes of going ahead with a wedding.
15	7	"Episode 7"	Catherine Morshead	Mark Greig	1 June 2009	6.41
When a drugs bust at a building site leads to the discovery of a body buried in concrete, Gene is convinced something is wrong, and focuses his attention on the site's owner, Michael Lafferty. However, he soon discovers someone within his department is leaking information about the case, and is shocked when his efforts to root it out reveal the leak is Chris. Alex begins to suspect she is recovering in hospital and will wake up back in 2008, but faces difficult questions about her parents' death, before she is shocked when a young Summers approaches Gene regarding matters concerning crooked cops.
16	8	"Episode 8"	Catherine Morshead	Matthew Graham	8 June 2009	7.18
Gene finally works to root out the police corruption in the force, after an informant of his is murdered shortly after revealing a gold bullion heist is soon to take place. Alex, shocked that Summers' younger self was murdered when he shouldn't have been, discovers the roses Summers left her were a clue towards a plan by corrupt police officers to intercept the robbers and steal the bullion. As Chris works to regain his teammates trust with an undercover sting, Gene leads efforts to thwart the heist, but accidentally shoots Alex in the chaos that follows - with her finding her return to the present is not without complications.

=== Season 3 (2010) ===
Season 3 consists of eight 60-minute episodes. The first episode of the series aired on 2 April 2010. Episodes 7 and 8 were joined as the show's first "two-parter".

No. overall	No. in season	Title	Directed by	Written by	Original release date	Viewers (millions)
17	1	"Episode 1"	David Drury	Matthew Graham	2 April 2010	6.62
Alex's hopes she has returned to 2008 are dashed when she awakens from a coma in 1983, a few months after being shot. Gene is willing to move on, as his team comes under the watchful eye of DCI Jim Keats, an unsavoury detective in Gene's opinion. The team soon have their hands full with finding an abducted schoolgirl, whose father, David Blonde, is unwilling to let the police assist after receiving a £50,000 ransom demand. As Alex works to keep the team together, she finds herself investigating matters that have arisen, including Sam Tyler's disappearance and a young police constable with a head wound that is haunting her.
18	2	"Episode 2"	David Drury	Ashley Pharoah	9 April 2010	5.96
Fenchurch East receives a severed hand in its post, which is linked to the disappearance of a woman that Gene led the investigation on. When the team find the woman's body, they soon link it to other women who disappeared, all of whom were divorced and signed up to a dating agency run by Elaine Downing. Shaz, disillusioned with the police force, holds back resignation to assist in catching the culprit, despite the risks involved. Alex is encouraged by Keats to investigate Tyler's disappearance, especially when she finds herself being haunted further by a number - "6620". Notes: Beth Goddard, Philip Glenister's real-life wife, guest starred in this episode.
19	3	"Episode 3"	Alrick Riley	Julie Rutterford	16 April 2010	5.89
Gene's team are placed under pressure to put a stop to a series of politically motivated arson attacks in the lead up to the 1983 General Election. Ray determines the culprit has a military background based on the devices being used to start the fires, but is reluctant to believe a ex-Falklands war veteran, Andy Smith, is involved. But revelations about Andy's life soon lead Ray to face his personal demons to resolve the case. Keats focuses on monitoring the team, hoping to weaken it, while Alex becomes concerned about seeing stars when Shaz states she experienced something very similar.
20	4	"Episode 4"	Alrick Riley	Jack Lothian	23 April 2010	5.58
Gene discovers an undercover police operation is occurring without his knowledge, aimed at bringing down father-and-son drug dealers Terry and Daniel Stafford. The team learn someone is compromising the operation, after the undercover cop, Louise Gardiner, is attacked after their cover is blown. Keats believes Gene's interference is jeopardizing efforts to bring down the Staffords, especially when Alex is knocked out whilst protecting Louise. However, Gene and Alex soon discover Louise may have been corrupted, after her superior confirms he has been aiding one of the Staffords in staying free.
21	5	"Episode 5"	Jamie Payne	Tom Butterworth and Chris Hurford	30 April 2010	6.02
Manchester detectives, DCI Derek Litton and DI Geoff Bevan, arrive in Fenchurch East in the pursuit of stand-up comic Frank Hardwick. Gene is not happy to see them, despite the reasons for pursuing Hardwick, while Alex hopes they can shed light on what happened to Sam Tyler. However, complications arise when Hardwick is nearly shot at, and Gene discovers one of his friends is potentially corrupt. During a sting on Litton and Bevan, Ray has a strange experience of seeing stars, before he and Shaz work to entrap Bevan when Litton realizes his partner is corrupt.
22	6	"Episode 6"	Jamie Payne	James Payne	7 May 2010	5.90
Police efforts to quell a prison riot go badly wrong when Sergeant Viv James, a friend of Gene and his team, is taken captive during the hasty withdrawal of officers. Gene determines the riot's leader Jason Sacks, a dangerous criminal serving a life sentence, is seeking to use Viv to gain his freedom. Chris and Ray attempt to rescue Viv, but are taken hostage themselves, while learning their friend was working with Sacks. After Alex confronts Sack's former cellmate, who claims to be Tyler, she and Gene work to save their friends lives before Special Forces attempt to take control of the situation.
23	7	"Episode 7"	David Drury	Ashley Pharoah	14 May 2010	6.07
An undercover cop is found dead in an illegal drinking den, leading to its owner, Tobias Ndbele, to be questioned behind what happened. Gene is not convinced the matter was a public disturbance, after explosives are later found in Tobias' possession, along with connections to events in South Africa. Keats pushes Alex to confront Gene about Tyler's disappearance in the wake of Viv's death, leading her to date him, as she gets closer to the truth about the unknown police constable haunting her. Chris starts hearing voices, and soon witnesses stars alongside Shaz and Ray.
24	8	"Episode 8"	David Drury	Matthew Graham	21 May 2010	7.00
A brutal gang murder is found to have connections to the activities of a European jewel smuggling ring run by Eric Hoorsten. As Ray leads the investigation, Gene pursues after Alex to Lancashire after Keats hints that she is getting close to a truth he rather not let her find. When she does, she learns the truth of the world she is in, much as Ray, Shaz and Chris do when they learn none of them are living anymore - each of them dying in tragic, undeserved circumstances. As Keats works to break up the team to a place they shouldn't go, Alex convinces Gene to keep them together to solve what will be their last case together before they move on.: Notes*: A post-credits sequence shows a clip from the 1950s police show Dixon of Dock Green, bidding the audience good night. The title character George Dixon was shot dead in an earlier film The Blue Lamp, despite the same character subsequently going on to star in the Dock Green TV series.
