= Linoleum (band) =

London-based indie–alternative musical group

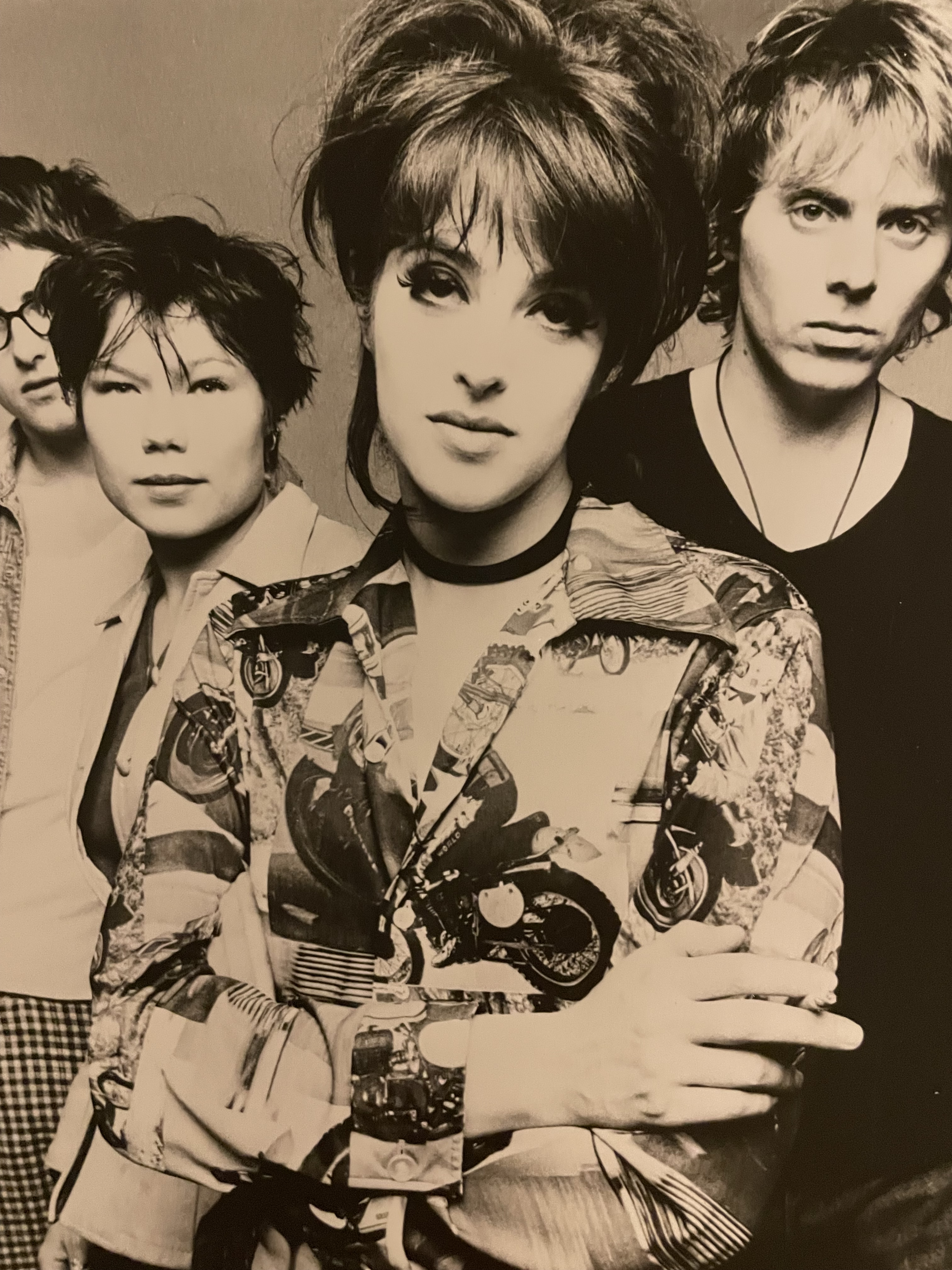

Background information
- Origin: London, England
- Genre: Indie rock
- Years active: 1994–2001
- Labels: Lino Vinyl, Fierce Panda
- Past members: Caroline Finch; Paul Jones; Emma Tornaro; Dave Nice; Gavin Pearce

Linoleum are a London-based indie–alternative musical group formed in 1994.

== History ==
Caroline Finch and Paul Jones first met in 1991 and began writing songs together. Finch (vocals, guitar) and Jones (guitar) were joined in 1994 by Dave Nice (drums), and in 1995 by Emma Tornaro (bass guitar), and the band signed a management deal with CMO at the end of 1995. The band set up their own Lino Vinyl label and all releases were on this label between 1996 and 1997. The first singles, "Dissent" and "Smear", came in sleeves made from linoleum.

The band's debut album, Dissent, was released in 1997 on Lino Vinyl, and was released in the United States by Geffen Records. Dissent was recorded at Fort Apache Studios in Cambridge, Massachusetts with Paul Kolderie and Sean Slade producing, whose previous efforts included projects with Radiohead, Hole and the Pixies among others. It received a mixed reaction and failed to make the breakthrough hoped for, leading to a change of label with Fierce Panda releasing later singles and second album The Race from the Burning Building (2000). Jones left in 2000 to join Elastica; He was replaced by Gavin Pearce.

Linoleum played their final gig before splitting at the Union Chapel, Islington in 2001.

After Elastica split in 2001 Paul Jones went on to work in A&R for and formed Slogan Records, releasing his favourite band The Fall's Fall Heads Roll album to critical acclaim in 2005. In 2006 he sat on the judging panel for an X-Factor type competition run by MySpace shown on Channel 4.

He is currently the head of A&R at Rough Trade Records. as well as managing the bands Black Midi and Shame with RT management

Since 2003, Caroline Finch has practised as a sound artist and composer and exhibited internationally under the name Caroline Devine. Devine’s site-specific sound installations explore hidden sounds, signals and voices and include Resonant Bodies for V&A Museum, London, Poetics of (Outer) Space for IKON Gallery, City of Things for Bletchley Park Codebreaking Centre and Resonant Space for Temple Contemporary, Philadelphia. In 2023 she created (In)Audible Air for the Monheim Triennale.

Devine's work, Recording Contract Recordings, MK Gallery, 2011 is a 14 channel sound installation that appropriates a Linoleum recording contract, presenting spoken text extracts in the form of a vinyl disc surrounded by test tones, room resonances and vocals.

Devine’s work has featured on BBC Radio 3, BBC Radio 4, BBC World Service and Resonance FM. In 2013, she was shortlisted for a BASCA British Composer Award in the Sonic Arts Category for 5 Minute Oscillations of the Sun and in 2014 for On Air. Her audiowalk On Common Ground was shortlisted for an Ivor Novello award in the Sound Arts category of The Ivors Composer Awards 2020.

Dave Nice has played live a number of times with singer-songwriter Sid Stronach, playing guitar and bass as well as the drums. He is a member of Oblong, and plays on the album Indicator (Expanding Records, 2006). He also plays guitar and provides some backing vocals on the Under Cambrian Sky album by Aberystwyth-based band The Lowland Hundred.

In 2010 the KEELERTORNERO gallery opened online featuring works by Emma Tornero who is now working as an artist.

== Reformation ==
In March 2022, after more than 20 years away, the band announced they were reforming to play live. They made their return at The Craufurd Arms, Wolverton on 15 September, followed by a set at the MOTH club in London in December of the same year. The band played again at the 2023 Shiiine On Festival in Minehead in November, and have plans for future gigs in 2024.

== Musical style ==
The band have variously been compared with Elastica, Sonic Youth, The Pretenders, PJ Harvey and the Pixies. New Wave and post-punk bands of the late 1970s and early 1980s have also been identified as an influence, and on the band's second album they covered The Passions' "I'm in Love with a German Film Star".

== Discography ==
=== Albums ===
List of albums, with selected chart positions
| Title | Album details | Peak chart positions | |
| Title | Album details | UK | AUS |
|---|---|---|---|
| Dissent | Released: 1997; Label: Lino Vinyl | — | 150 |
| The Race from the Burning Building | Released: 2000; Label: Fierce Panda | — | — |

=== Singles ===
- "Dissent" / "Twisted" (1996), Lino Vinyl UK No. 171
- "Smear" (1996), Lino Vinyl UK No. 129
- "On a Tuesday" (1997) Lino Vinyl UK No. 80, AU No. 156
- "Marquis" (1997) Lino Vinyl - UK No. 73
- "Your Back Again" (1999), Fierce Panda - split single with Sing-Sing
- "I'm in Love with a German Film Star" (2000), Fierce Panda
