= Elgin Avenue Breakdown =

Compilation album by The 101ers
- Released: March 1981; June 14, 2005 (re-release)
- Recorded: November 28, 1975 – May 22, 1976
- Genre: Pub rock
- Length: 32:22 / 65:04
- Label: Andalucia (original); Astralwerks / EMI (re-released)
- Producer: Vic Maile; Micky Foote; Simon Jeffes on "Surf City" & "Keys to Your Heart"; Roger Armstrong on "Sweet Revenge"; Remastering: Peter Mew at Abbey Road Studios, London.

Re-release cover

Elgin Avenue Breakdown is a compilation album by The 101ers, Joe Strummer's band before he joined The Clash. It was released on Andalucía Records (distributed by Virgin) in 1981 because of The Clash's popularity but mooted at the time that it was a semi-unofficial release due to Joe Strummer's contractual obligations with CBS. The first 500 copies came with a free poster. Just a few thousand copies were sold. The re-issue by EMI in 2005 has an accompanying booklet with an overview by Allan Jones and detailed notes on each track by Richard Dudanski.

Professional ratings
Review scores
Source	Rating
Allmusic 1981	link

Professional ratings
Review scores
Source	Rating
Allmusic 2005	link

== Track listing ==
Original release

The original Andalucía release of Elgin Avenue Breakdown contained 4 of the 6 songs recorded by Dr. Feelgood and Motörhead producer Vic Maile, as a centrepiece. He had agreed to their use on the album in return for royalties. The 101ers owned the rights to the BBC Maida Vale recordings so they could also be used. However, most of the Pathway Studios material recorded by Roger Armstrong was not allowed on. There was one exception: "Sweet Revenge". Partly this was a cross promotional idea because pub-rock and proto punk record label Chiswick wanted to release the track as a single when they found out about plans for the album. The other fact is that the 101ers had allowed Roger's use of "Five Star Rock n Roll Petrol" from the BBC Maida Vale Sessions as the B-side for "Keys to your Heart" on Chiswick's 1976 single. Simon Jeffes of Penguin Cafe Orchestra, and also known for assisting Sex Pistols producer Bill Price with the string arrangement for the Sid Vicious version of "My Way" which reached #7 on the UK singles charts as part of The Great Rock 'n' Roll Swindle soundtrack, produced Keys to your Heart of which the reissue of the album features two versions, one significantly faster than the original. Roger felt honour bound to allow the use of one Pathway track on Elgin Avenue Breakdown.

Some observations on the songwriting:

'Usually Woody would come up with the lyrics and an idea for the melody and chords, and then develop it further with Clive, before bringing it to the band room where we would all knock it around until it took final shape.'

In mid-January 1976, Mole was replaced by Dan Kelleher. Here are a few observations on Dan's contribution:

'Apart from his experience and dexterity on bass, he had other skills to offer. The backing vocals was one area that immediately improved with not just his singing but also with the harmony parts that he arranged, and then there were two or three songs on which he sang lead vocal, which would give Joe a welcome breather at strategic points in the set. He also helped me in working out new drum patterns.'

The official credits are for Strummer and the 101ers unless otherwise noted.

1. "Letsagetabitarockin'" - 2:07
2. "Silent Telephone" - 2:20
3. "Monkey Business" (live) (Chuck Berry) - 2:22
4. "Shake Your Hips" (live) (Slim Harpo) - 3:26
5. "Junco Partner" (live) (Traditional; arranged by James Wayne) - 3:19
6. "Don't Let It Go" (Bo Diddley) - 2:54
7. "Motor Boys Motor" - 2:22
8. "Sweety of the St. Moritz" - 2:24
9. "Surf City" (Dan Kelleher, 101ers) - 2:47
10. "Keys to Your Heart" (Strummer) - 3:09
11. "Sweet Revenge" - 2:57
12. "Gloria" (live) (Van Morrison) - 3:34

Tracks 1, 2, 7, 8 recorded 28/11/75, Jacksons Studio, Rickmansworth
Track 11 recorded 04/03/76, Pathway Studios, Kentish Town
Tracks 9, 10 recorded 10/04/76, BBC Studios, Maida Vale
Tracks 3–6 and 12 recorded 18/04/76, The Roundhouse, Chalk Farm on a cassette by Mickey Foote

Re-release

1. "Letsagetabitarockin'" - 2:08
2. "Silent Telephone" - 2:21
3. "Keys To Your Heart" (Strummer) (version 1) (Chiswick Single Version) - 3:44
4. "Rabies (From the Dogs of Love)" - 3:13
5. "Sweet Revenge" - 2:58
6. "Motor Boys Motor" - 2:23
7. "Steamgauge 99" (previously unreleased) - 3:36
8. "5 Star R'n'R" (Strummer, Kelleher) - 2:56
9. "Surf City" (Kelleher, 101ers)- 2:49
10. "Keys To Your Heart" (Strummer) (version 2) - 3:08
11. "Sweety Of The St.Moritz" - 2:24
12. "Hideaway" (previously unreleased) - 2:48
13. "Shake Your Hips" (live) (Slim Harpo)(previously unreleased) - 3:37
14. "Lonely Mother's Son" (live) (previously unreleased) - 3:46
15. "Don't Let It Go" (live) (Bo Diddley) - 2:51
16. "Keep Taking the Tablets" (live) (previously unreleased) - 4:04
17. "Junco Partner" (live) (Traditional; arranged by James Wayne) (previously unreleased) - 3:31
18. "Out of Time" (live) (Mick Jagger, Keith Richards) (previously unreleased) - 2:56
19. "Maybelline" (live) (Chuck Berry) (previously unreleased) - 1:57
20. "Gloria" (live) (Van Morrison) (previously unreleased) - 8:04

Tracks 1,2,6,7,11,12 recorded 28/11/75, Jackson's Studio, Rickmansworth
Track 3 recorded 10/03/76, Pathway Studios, Kentish Town
Tracks 4,5 recorded 04/03/76, Pathway Studios, Kentish Town
Tracks 8,9,10 recorded 28/03/76 and 10/04/76, BBC Studios, Maida Vale
Tracks 13,14,16,17,19 recorded 21/05/76, Camberwell Art School, London
Track 15 recorded 18/04/76, The Roundhouse, Chalk Farm
Track 18 recorded 21/03/76, Wandsworth Prison, London
Track 20 recorded 22/05/76, Cellar Club, Bracknell

== Personnel ==
The 101ers

- Joe Strummer - vocals, guitar
- Clive Timperley - guitar, backing vocals
- Dan Kelleher - keyboards, bass, backing vocals, vocals on "Surf City" and "Keep Taking the Tablets"
- John Mole - bass
- Richard Dudanski - drums, backing vocals

Technical

- Roger Armstrong - producer
- Simon Jeffes - producer
- Vic Maile - producer
- Barry Farmer - engineer
- Micky Foote - engineer
- Mike Robinson - engineer
- Vic Keary - remixing
- Howard Massey - remixing
- Peter Mew - digital remastering
- Nigel Reeve - A&R
- Simon T. Bramley - poster design
- Esperanza Romero - drawing
- Janette Beckman - photography
- Ray Eagle - photography
- Julian Yewdall - photography
