= Buttons (pantomime) =

Character from the pantomime Cinderella

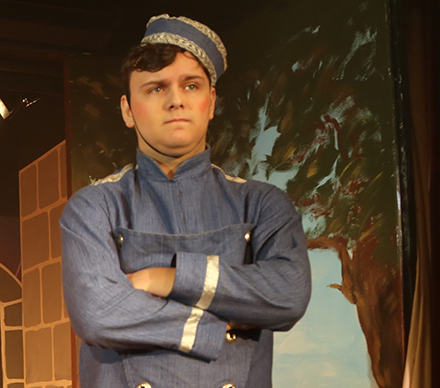
An actor playing Buttons in a 2015 pantomime in Herne Bay, England

Buttons is a traditional character in Cinderella pantomimes, and is commonly portrayed in Cinderella pantomimes throughout the UK and Australia. He is typically a male servant of the household who helps Cinderella and loves her, and who is liked and trusted but not loved by her. The character has sometimes been called Pedro.

The character first appeared in 1860 at the Strand Theatre, London in a version of the story derived from the opera La Cenerentola by Rossini. Rossini includes a character Dandini as assistant to the Prince, which was also included, and a complementary character for Cinderella, called Buttoni, was added for the pantomime at this time. 'Buttons' was at that time a name for a young male servant or pageboy commonly having gilt buttons down the front of his jacket.

While the character introduces a note of pathos in his unrequited love for Cinderella, he is often portrayed in a comic tone.

== People who have played Buttons ==
- Arthur Askey 26 December 1947 Radio BBC Home Service
- Graham Bickley 1991 Richmond Theatre Surrey
- Jack Buchanan 1941 unspecified Midlands Theatre
- Brian Conley 2009, 2015 and 2021
- Ronnie Corbett
- Billy Dainty 1976 Manchester Opera House
- Jim Davidson 1988 Dominion Theatre London
- Lonnie Donegan 1966 Alhambra Theatre, Glasgow
- Bud Flanagan 1945 Adelphi Theatre
- Tommy Handley 26 December 1929 BBC Radio
- Jack Hulbert 27 December 1948 BBC TV
- David Jason 1979 Newcastle Theatre Royal
- Danny Kaye mid-1950s in Sydney, New South Wales, Australia
- Paul Keating 2007 The Old Vic
- Adele King 1984 Olympia Theatre, Dublin
- Harry Lauder 1907 first stage appearance
- Lee Mack 2021 in Not Going Out
- Tom O'Connor 1976 Southport Theatre
- Jimmy O'Dea 1923 Queen's Theatre, Dublin
- Wilfred Pickles 1947 Bradford Alhambra
- Zack Polanski 2000 at MADS Theatre
- Ted Ray 1942 unspecified Midland Theatre
- Frank Skinner 2000 TV film of stage show
- Tommy Steele 1958 Rodgers and Hammerstein musical version in London.
- Jimmy Tarbuck 25 December 1969 BBC1 TV
- Tommy Trinder 1948-9 London Palladium later undated
- Tim Vine 2018 New Wimbledon Theatre
- Wee Georgie Wood 1936 Birmingham theatre
- Bradley Walsh 2013 Orchard Theatre, Dartford
