= Radio Concord =

Pirate radio station in London, England

- Country: London
- Launch date: 1972
- Dissolved: 1976

Radio Concord was a pirate radio station which broadcast from west London on AM 225, medium wave between 1972 and 1976.

The station sometimes broadcast from a house in Maida Vale where "Joe Strummer" lived with the 101ers. This was a politicised counterculture station, and would comment on issues like Northern Ireland and housing rights.

== DJs and staff ==
The following aliases appear to have been used on air:

- El Supremo (The Supreme Dialect / Dalek) aka Tommy Arnold
- King Kong
- Joe Lung, aka Mrs Scum, Doo Wop King etc.
- Matt Black
- Len "almond slices" Deevish, aka Wolfman Fred, Keith York
- Jebediah Strutt, aka John the Baptist, The Amazing Spicer, Saskatoon Kid, Ezekial Fudge
- Simon Enfield
- Philip Day aka Philip Bendall
- Kelvin Michaels
- Dan Blocker
- Louis Deco
- Don "my old fruit" Stevens
- California Sunshine
- Anne Night in Gale Force 7
- Amy Turtle
- Anne Boleyn (with her head)
- Snoopy
- Charles De Gaul
- Captain Banana
- Dismal Dave
- Dave the Deserter
- Mick Dogfood
- Red Dirt and the Power Pack
