= Peter Zirschky =

- Born: The Netherlands
- Died: c. 2004; The Netherlands
- Genres: Punk rock, hardcore punk
- Occupation(s): Vocalist, musician, songwriter
- Instrument(s): Vocals, guitar
- Years active: 1980–1999
- Labels: Hopeless, Diehard Records, WRF Records, Swaddle Records
- Formerly of: Funeral Oration

Peter Zirschky was the singer and songwriter for the Dutch hardcore punk band Funeral Oration. He was the only constant member of the band, being their frontman since the very beginning in 1982 until their break up circa 1999. He also played guitar on some of their early recordings. Zirschky, a long-time horror movie fan, was also the founder of Horror Relations and Savage Cinema fanzines and distro. He even named his cat Lucio – after the famous Italian film director Lucio Fulci. Peter Zirschky died by accident around 2004.

After listening to punk rock for a couple of years, Peter Zirschky decided to start a punk band. It was 1980 and they called themselves Art Protexion, probably because Zirschky's favourite band at the time was The Art Attacks. Drummer Ferry Fidom and bassplayer Mike de Veer joined him an year later in Last Warning. They soon changed their name to Funeral Oration, with no thought behind that, but broke up two months later.

In 1983, Zirschky placed an ad in the Dutch punk magazine Koekrand, saying: "Need a bassplayer, don't have to be good, but has to be pretty fast", recruiting William Steinhäuser to play the bass and forming the core of the revived Funeral Oration. The band went on to release numerous EPs, two cassette-only albums and 7 full-length LPs, the pinnacle of which was their debut album "Communion" (1985), and also toured the States three times during the 1990s.
