= The Derelicts =

- Origin: London, England
- Genres: Pub rock, punk rock, R&B
- Years active: 1974–1976
- Past members: Susan Gogan; Barbara Gogan; Richard Williams; Marion Fudger; John Studholme; Sue Allegra; Debby Hall; Alan Lofting; John Harris; Dan Kelleher

The Derelicts were a London-based "Trotskyist R&B band" active from 1974 to 1976, well known on the London pub rock/squat rock circuit, consisting of Susan Gogan, lead vox/artwork; Richard Williams, drums; Barbara Gogan, guitar/backing vox; Marion Fudger, bass; and John Studholme, guitar; Debby Moss, violin; John Harris, bass; Alan Lofting, who was shy and would play facing the back of the stage, guitar; Sue Allegra, vox/backing vox; Dan Kelleher, ex The 101ers, bass.

The band was started when Sue Allegra, who was working at the Fender Soundhouse, phoned Barbara Gogan one day and told her: "Find thirty quid. I'm sending a man over with a Les Paul copy and an AC30 amp, and you're going to buy them." Then Richard went to Bristol and got his drums out of storage. A couple of weeks later, they played their first show upstairs in a pub in northwest London. The line-up was: Sue Gogan, Barbara Gogan, Richard Williams, Sue Allegra, John Harris, Alan Lofting and Debby Moss.

When the band split up, some of the former members went on to start two other bands – Barbara Gogan and Williams joined the not-yet-named The Passions, formed by songwriter and bassist Claire Bidwell, and Susan Gogan and Studholme formed pragVEC. Bass guitarist Marion Fudger went on to join The Art Attacks.
