= Álvaro Peña-Rojas =

Chilean singer-songwriter (1943–2026)

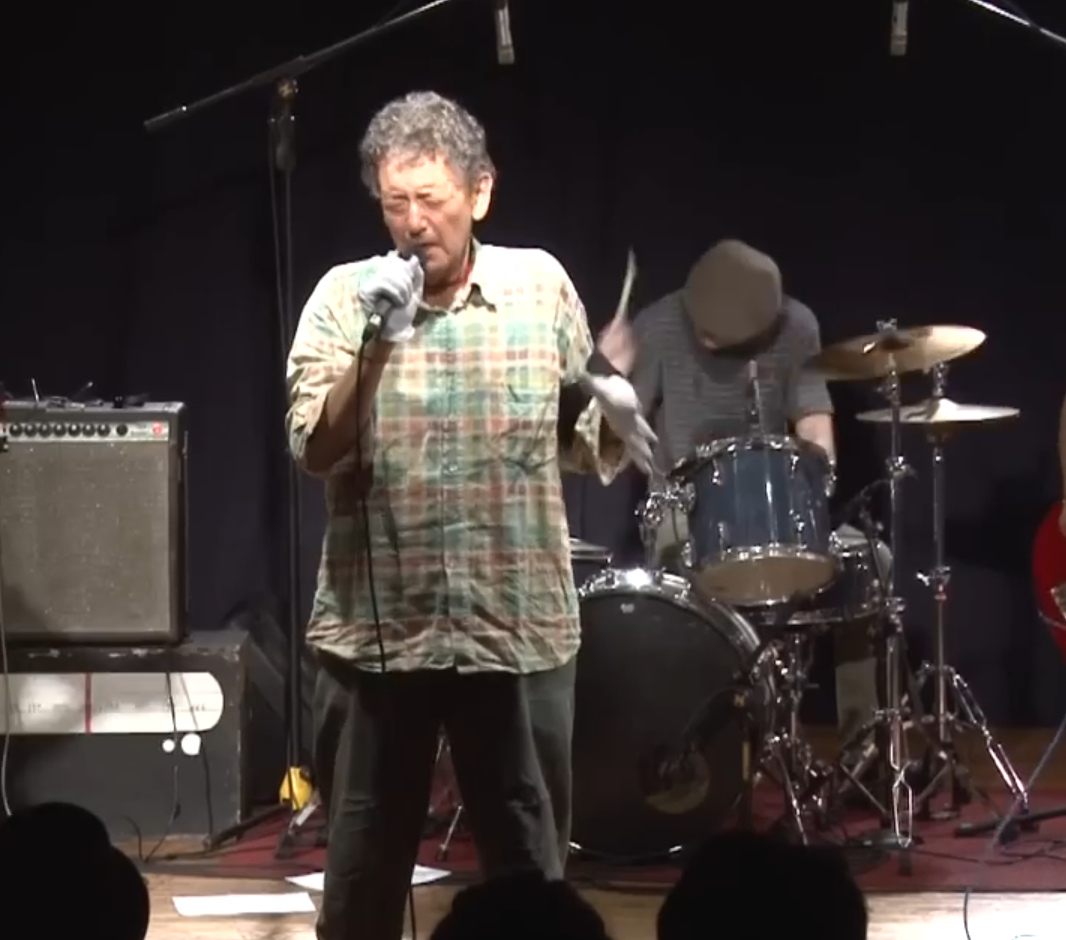

Álvaro Peña-Rojas (September 7, 1943 – January 8, 2026) was a Chilean singer-songwriter, and a pioneer of punk rock in Chile. While he was not an award winning musician with large tours, he has established a cult status.

Peña-Rojas was born in Valparaíso. He attended The Mackay School. He had saxophone lessons and was self-taught on the piano. His first performance was in 1962 playing saxophone. He played rock and roll, mambo, and bebop to punk and experimental music. Some of the early bands he played with were Los Dandys, Los Challengers, and Los Bumerangs. With Challengers and Bumerangs he had three singles released between 1965 and 1967. He then played for the Casino Orchestra where he became proficient in Latin rhythms.

Peña-Rojas opted for a different career once he became a husband and father. He became a creative copywriter at J. Walter Thompson.

He was already in London when the 1973 Chilean coup d'état happened and he decided to remain in England as a refugee. In 1974 he became one of the founding members of The 101ers, a rockabilly band. The band included Joe Strummer who later co-founded The Clash. Peña-Rojas played tenor saxophone in the band. The association helped him to develop a connection to the punk subculture.

His first solo album was made in 1977. The album included the song "Valparaíso" about the places he left behind. He self-produced many recordings during his career under his Squeaky Shoes label. His discography contains LPs, EPs, and limited-edition singles. He sold many of the recordings at his concerts rather than at a retailer. He also changed the covers frequently, even drawing some himself. All of that makes it difficult to have a complete discography.

== Personal life ==
Peña-Rojas did not associate with other Chilean exiles in London. He eventually moved to Konstanz, Germany. He married Hilde Schneider but the couple divorced though the dates are not known. Peña-Rojas continued visits to Chile until late in life.

Peña-Rojas died in Konstanz on January 8, 2026, at the age of 82.

== Works about the musician ==
A biographical musical about Peña-Rojas was performed in Germany in 2004. Journalist René Cevasco wrote the book Señales crudos in 2008 about the lyrics of Peña-Rojas.

The 2008 documentary Full dedication Álvaro won the In-Edit Chile Festival award for best international documentary. The movie includes interviews from a diverse group including his bassist, musicologists, and even his elderly neighbor. In 2009 Alejandra Fritis released the documentary Álvaro de Valparaíso. In 2019 Álvaro: Rockstars Don't Wet the Bed by director Jorge Catoni won the festival award at In-Edit Chile. Alvaro Inside Out was released in Germany in 2025 by director Christian Zschammer.

== Discography (selection) ==
- Drinkin' my own sperm (1977)
- Mum's milk not powder (1978)
- The working class (1979)
- Repetition kills (1982)
- Is the garment ready (1988)
- Boleros - Südamerikanische Schnulzen (1995)
- 8 fingers (2006)
- The tongue (2008)
- Álvaro Peña and Fatiga de Material live (2011) from La Cantera bar, in Valparaíso
- For sale (2012)
- Seventy years old (2013)
- I am a coward (2018)
- R80 (2025)
