= Windsor Castle, Maida Vale =

Former pub in Maida Vale, London

Windsor Castle
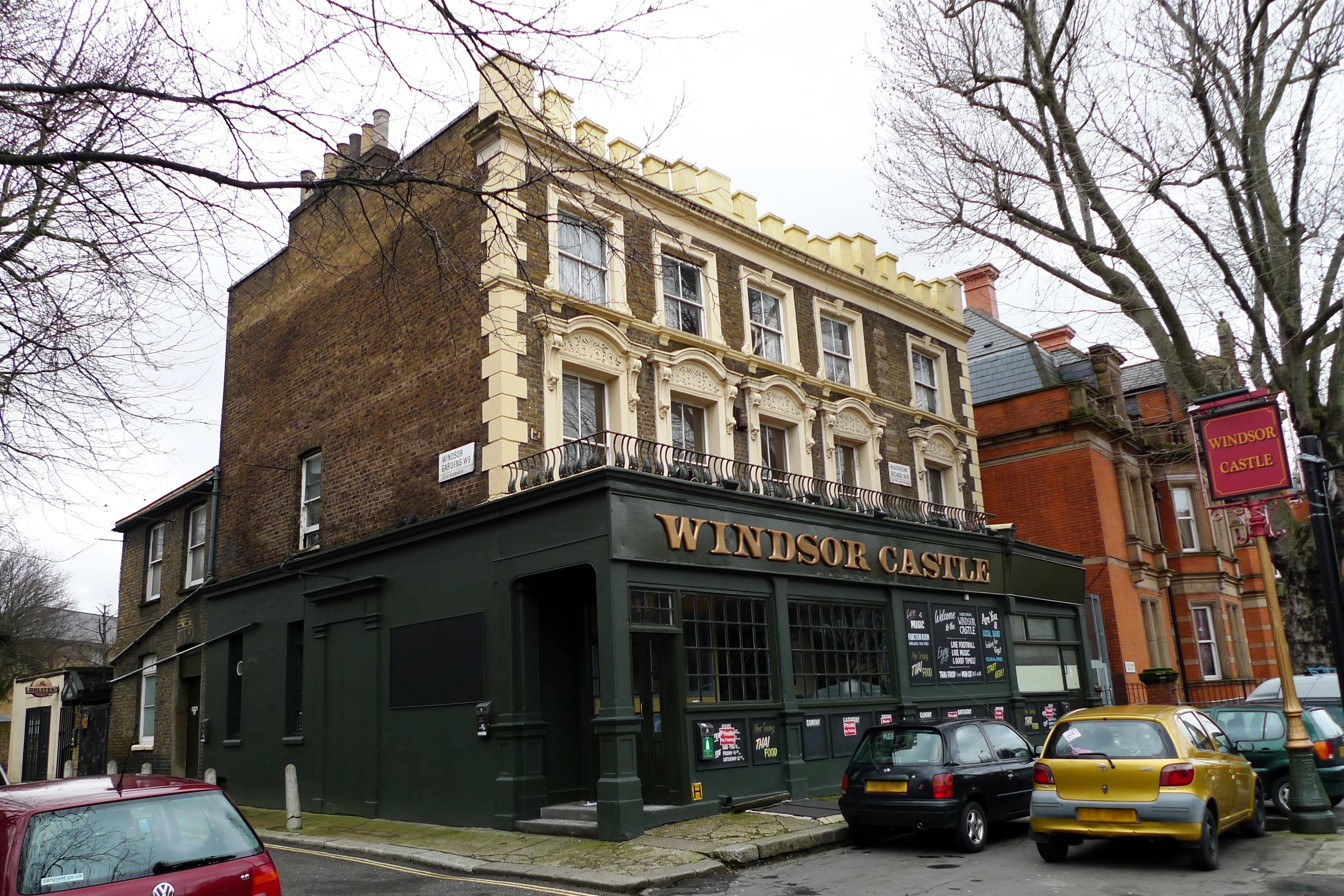
- Interactive map of Windsor Castle
- Location: 309 Harrow Road, London
- Coordinates: 51.52337°N 0.19784°W
- Type: Pub
- Event: Rock/Punk

Construction
- Opened: 1829
- Closed: 2009

The Windsor Castle is a former public house on Harrow Road, Maida Vale, London. It was a seminal rock venue throughout the 1960s and 1970s, with notable early performances from The Rolling Stones, The Who and U2. The building is a designated heritage asset.

== History ==
The Windsor Castle opened on Harrow Road in 1829. It was rebuilt in its current style around 1850, with stucco plaster around the windows, quoins and a castellated parapet.

The Windsor Castle became a music venue in the 1960s. It is renowned for early gigs by the Rolling Stones and The Who. Other bands who played there and who went on to achieve mainstream success include Dr. Feelgood, The Jam, U2 and the Psychedelic Furs

Joe Strummer, later of The Clash, played there a number of times as a member of the 101ers. The Clash song 'Protex Blue' was inspired by the condom vending machine in the pub's toilets.

From the mid 1970s, the entertainment on offer at the Windsor Castle also included exotic dancers and striptease performers who performed in the main pub area. The pub was exceptionally busy at Friday and Sunday lunchtimes when the Windsor Castle turned into a strip pub. In the 21st century, they decided to separate the family pub area from the strip pub area by converting part of the upstairs area of the premises into a strip club in an attempt to increase revenue. This failed and the pub finally closed in 2009.

The building has subsequently been used for office accommodation and short term lodgings. An application to demolish it was rejected in early 2011 and it has been redeveloped.

== Notable performers ==
- The Rolling Stones
- The Who
- U2
- Iron Maiden – were banned from the venue after an argument with the management
- The Cure
- 101ers
- Dr. Feelgood
- The Jam
- Hawkwind
- Madness
- Psychedelic Furs
- The Stranglers
- Dexys Midnight Runners – played their debut London gig
- The Ruts
- The Incredible Kidda Band
- Tubeway Army
