= The Elgin, Ladbroke Grove =

Listed pub in Notting Hill, London, England

The Elgin
- The pub in 2017

- Location within Royal Borough of Kensington and Chelsea Location within Greater London
- Former names: Frog and Firkin

General information
- Type: Public house
- Location: 96 Ladbroke Grove, Notting Hill, London, England
- Coordinates: 51°30′58″N 0°12′32″W
- Year built: Mid-19th century
- Renovated: 1898 (refurbished)
- Owner: Young's

Design and construction
- Designations

Listed Building – Grade II
- Official name: The Elgin public house
- Designated: 26 July 1976
- Reference no.: 1225123

Website
- theelginnottinghill.co.uk

The Elgin is a Grade II listed public house on Ladbroke Grove in Notting Hill, London, England. The mid-19th-century building is noted for its richly decorated Victorian interior, which has been recognised by the Campaign for Real Ale (CAMRA) as being of "outstanding national historic importance". The pub has historical associations with Timothy Evans and John Christie, and was later a venue for the mod and punk scenes, including a residency by The 101ers in 1975.

== History ==
The building is a mid-19th-century public house. It was first licensed in 1856 and takes its name from the Elgin family, including Thomas Bruce, 7th Earl of Elgin, who is associated with the Elgin Marbles. The Campaign for Real Ale (CAMRA) states that the pub was rebuilt in its present form in 1868 to designs by Hammack and Lambert. It was later refurbished in 1898.

During the Second World War, the pub was frequented by Timothy Evans and John Christie, both of whom lived nearby. Evans was wrongfuly convicted and executed for murders later attributed to Christie, and the resulting miscarriage of justice became a significant factor in the abolition of capital punishment in the United Kingdom. The Elgin was a mod venue in the 1960s and a punk rock venue in the 1970s. In May 1975, The 101ers were offered a weekly residency there, leading to a nine-month engagement. Notable patrons have included Joe Strummer of The Clash.

On 26 July 1976, The Elgin was designated a Grade II listed building. It was included on CAMRA's National Inventory of Historic Pub Interiors before the inventory's grading system was revised. Under the revised scheme, it is rated three stars and its interior is regarded as being "of outstanding national historic importance".

The pub was at one stage known as the Frog and Firkin, although the dates during which it traded under that name are unclear. As of October 2026, the freehold was owned by Young's.

== Architecture ==
=== Exterior ===
The building has three storeys, with four window bays facing Ladbroke Grove and three facing Westbourne Park Road. Its exterior is built of brick with contrasting decorative detailing, while the ground floor is arranged as a traditional pub frontage framed by substantial columns. The first-floor windows have arched tops and pronounced hood moulds, while those on the floor above are topped by shallower arches with ornamental details above each opening. At roof level, an embellished projecting cornice is supported by brackets and rises to a solid parapet.

=== Interior ===
The interior retains much of its Victorian character, with three originally separate rooms that remain clearly identifiable despite now being interconnected. The most distinctive feature is an elaborate timber-and-glass screen decorated with etched and gilded detailing, which separates one of the bars from the corner room. Other surviving features include an ornate bar-back with carved woodwork, mirrors and decorative reliefs, coloured tilework, original bar counters, and a large rear lounge with dado panelling and a skylight. Decorative glass also survives in the former office behind the servery. Although much of the historic interior remains intact, the original Victorian bar-back in the corner bar has been replaced by a modern fitting.

== See also ==
- List of pubs in London
