= Ashes to Ashes (British TV series) =

2008 British television fantasy drama series

- Title sequence
- Genre: Time travel; Supernatural drama; Science fiction; Police procedural; Period drama
- Created by: Matthew Graham; Ashley Pharoah
- Starring: Philip Glenister; Keeley Hawes; Dean Andrews; Marshall Lancaster; Montserrat Lombard; Adrian Dunbar; Daniel Mays
- Composer: Edmund Butt
- Country of origin: United Kingdom
- Original language: English
- No. of series: 3
- No. of episodes: 24 (list of episodes)

Production
- Running time: 60 minutes
- Production companies: Kudos Film and Television; BBC Wales; Monastic Productions

Original release
- Network: BBC One (2008–2010); BBC HD (2010)
- Release: 7 February 2008 – 21 May 2010

Related
- Life on Mars

Ashes to Ashes is a British fantasy crime drama and police procedural drama television series, serving as the sequel to Life on Mars.

The series began airing on BBC One in February 2008. A second series began broadcasting in April 2009. A third and final series was broadcast from 2 April to 21 May 2010 on BBC One and BBC HD.

== Premise ==
Ashes to Ashes focuses on the life of Alex Drake (Keeley Hawes), a Detective Inspector with the London Metropolitan Police who specializes in psychology, and who is a divorced mother who looks after her only child, her daughter Molly. In 2008, Alex is examining the case file of Sam Tyler (John Simm), a Detective Chief Inspector, who gave an account of an experience he had whilst in a coma following a car accident, prior to his decision to jump off a building; Tyler having now died a year ago following a prolonged coma he never came out of. During a routine trip to her daughter's school, Alex is called in to deal with a situation involving ex-criminal mastermind Arthur Layton, but is kidnapped by him when the situation seems to be resolved. Unable to talk him down, Layton shoots her, whereupon she blacks out and inexplicably regains consciousness in 1981, encountering DCI Gene Hunt (Philip Glenister), DC Ray Carling (Dean Andrews), and DC Chris Skelton, whom Tyler spoke about. All three now work at Fenchurch CID, aided by PC Shaz Granger (Montserrat Lombard) - a young officer for whom Chris develops feelings.

Like Tyler, Alex is uncertain of where she is, and why she is there, and experiences out-of-reality situations which include connections to reality in 2008 and TV shows referencing her situation. Whilst coping with these experiences, she attempts to use her skills and experience from the future to help her, as she becomes involved in various police cases. As with its predecessor, the programme is ambiguous over whether Alex is dead or alive in the present day and to what extent her actions influence future events. In addition, each series maintains an overarching plot concerning events that Alex needs to understand: a mysterious clown in the first series, resembling one from a David Bowie music video, and an encounter with her mother prior to the day she and Alex's father die in a car bombing; roses being provided by a police officer from the future in the second series, alongside a theme of police corruption; and stars and a young police constable with a head wound in the third series, with Ray, Chris and Shaz beginning to have out-of-reality experiences during this time.

=== Ending ===
The final episode reveals that the Life on Mars/Ashes to Ashes world is a form of limbo or purgatory, for "restless dead" police officers. These restless dead include Drake, Sam Tyler and the main characters Gene, Ray, Chris, and Shaz, all of whom died in violent circumstances.

The revelation of their deaths comes as a surprise to all except Gene, who knew they were all dead but who had forgotten the circumstances of his own death, due to the passage of time. All except Hunt "move on" as he is a psychopomp (a spirit guide), an Archangel Michael-like figure, to all of his officers, helping them on their way to The Railway Arms pub (standing for heaven).

During the final series, the character of DCI Jim Keats was introduced, originally appearing to be assessing the capabilities of Gene's division. However, in reality, Keats was the devil who was attempting to bring down Gene and his world, dragging Hunt's colleagues down to 'his department' (hell). When he is finally defeated, Keats slinks into the night, laughing insanely and singing to Gene "We'll meet again, don't know where, don't know when."

Finally Gene returns to his office, where a newly dead officer arrives, demanding his iPhone (implying that he is from the present) and asking where his office has gone, in a very similar manner to the arrival of Sam Tyler in the first episode of Life on Mars. In fact, Gene's last words – "A word in your shell-like, pal" – are the same as his first words to Sam Tyler in the first episode of Life on Mars.

== Cast ==
- Philip Glenister as Gene Hunt
- Keeley Hawes as Alex Drake
- Dean Andrews as Ray Carling
- Marshall Lancaster as Chris Skelton
- Montserrat Lombard as Shaz Granger
- Adrian Dunbar as Martin Summers (series 2)
- Daniel Mays as Jim Keats (series 3)

== Production ==
First series episodes were directed by Jonny Campbell, Bille Eltringham and Catherine Morshead.

Filming for the second series began in 2008. The second series takes place six months after the first, set in 1982 during the Falklands War. The episodes were shot on Super 16 film and mastered in 576p standard definition.

A third, and final, series was commissioned, and filming of the eight 60-minute episodes began in late 2009. This final series was shot in Super 16 again but telecined and mastered for high definition. In an interview with SFX, series co-creator and executive producer Matthew Graham stated that he was considering making a 3D episode. Once again, the series moved on a year, this time to 1983. Philip Glenister, speaking on the BBC One Breakfast TV programme on 8 June 2009, announced that the third series would be the last. Producers revealed the climax of the show would reveal who the character of Gene Hunt really is. The third series concluded on 21 May 2010.

The Audi Quattro was not available in right-hand drive in the United Kingdom in 1981, only in left-hand drive. The car shown in the TV series is the 1983 model, with slight changes to the headlights and other features. Costume designer Rosie Hackett explained the challenge in not using any eighties fashion not yet available in the year the respective series is set in (1981, 1982 and 1983 respectively). One reason for moving the sequel to London from the Manchester setting of Life on Mars was because the iconic eighties fashion would not have reached smaller cities at the time.

== Distribution ==
Throughout the first series, Ashes to Ashes was broadcast weekly on Thursdays on BBC One at 9:00 pm. The second series began airing on 20 April 2009 in the same timeslot. The third and final series premiered on 2 April 2010.

=== International ===
The programme premiered in America on 7 March 2009, available on both cable and satellite. The second series began broadcasting on BBC America on 11 May 2010 at 10:00 pm ET.

In Australia, Series 1 of Ashes to Ashes commenced on 10 August 2009 on ABC1, with the second series shown directly after. The third series commenced on 13 January 2011 on ABC1.

In Denmark, series 1 was shown for the first time on DR2 at 19.05 each weekday evening from 25 November 2011 under the title En hård nyser: Kommissær Hunt.

In Portugal, the show was broadcast by Fox Life, while in Latin America, the series is shown on HBO Plus.

In Italy, Ashes to Ashes was broadcast by Rai 4.

In Europe, Ashes to Ashes was broadcast by BBC Entertainment.

== Episode guide ==
Series	Episodes	Originally released		Avg. UK viewers (millions)
Series	Episodes	First released	Last released	Avg. UK viewers (millions)
1	8	7 February 2008	27 March 2008	6.60
2	8	20 April 2009	8 June 2009	6.51
3	8	2 April 2010	21 May 2010	6.13

The first series, set in 1981, consists of eight episodes, written mainly by creators Ashley Pharoah (episodes 2 & 8) and Matthew Graham (episodes 1 & 7). Other writers for the series were Julie Rutterford (episode three) and Mark Greig (episodes 4 & 5), who worked on the parent series, Life on Mars. The remaining episode (6) was written by freelance writer Mick Ford. In this series Alex tries to figure out what happened to her parents, whose lives are connected to the political unrest of the time, especially Margaret Thatcher's campaign and Lord Scarman's attacks on the police. Alex is haunted by a mysterious figure who seems to be the Clown from the music video of David Bowie's "Ashes to Ashes", reminiscent of the Test-Card Girl who bedevilled Sam Tyler in Life on Mars. (The clown's identity is revealed in the last episode of the first series.)

The second series of eight episodes is set in 1982, against the political background of the Falklands War. The first episode, written by Ashley Pharoah, deals with the cover-up of the killing of a police officer in a nightclub. As the series progresses, Alex's comatose body is found in present-day 2008. Gene finds himself confronting a corrupted force and Alex begins receiving a string of phone calls from a man called Martin Summers, another patient at the hospital to which she has been moved, and a key figure in the web of corruption Hunt is trying to bring down. Summers proves to be a formidable adversary, whose actions eventually lead to a murder and an extremely tense confrontation between Alex and Gene. The series ends with Alex awakening in what seems to be the present, but she is horrified to find Gene's face on monitors, pleading for help.

In the third and final series, set yet another year forward in 1983, DCI Gene Hunt, DI Alex Drake and the rest of the team all return, joined by a new addition, DCI Jim Keats, a discipline and complaints officer. Alex returns to the 1980s after being brought round by Gene, and she comes to believe the 2008 she woke up in was only a dream. Her connection to the present seems weaker than before, while Hunt is trying to stop his department crumbling from within due to Keats' presence. Although Jim is ostensibly friendly with Hunt's officers, he makes no effort to conceal his hatred of Gene when the two are alone, and attempts to turn Alex against him. Prompted by the haunting of a dead policeman and visions of stars, Alex becomes suspicious of the role Gene played in Sam Tyler's death following his return to the past, and, urged on by Jim, she eventually discovers the truth of Gene Hunt, her colleagues and the world she has been transported to.

In addition, the main cast appeared in short sketches for Children in Need 2008 (with Richard Hammond as himself) and Sport Relief 2010 (with Dickie Davies, Daley Thompson, Duncan Goodhew, Steve Cram, David Gower, Michael Parkinson, Sam Torrance, Tony Hadley, Paul Daniels and Debbie McGee as 1983 versions of themselves).

== Soundtracks ==
Ashes to Ashes

Soundtrack album by various artists
- Released: 17 March 2008
- Genre: Pop rock
- Label: Sony BMG

Ashes to Ashes chronology
Life on Mars (2007)	Ashes to Ashes (2008)	Ashes to Ashes – Series 2 (2009)

Ashes to Ashes – Series 2

Soundtrack album by various artists
- Released: 20 April 2009
- Genre: Pop rock
- Label: Sony Music

Ashes to Ashes chronology
Ashes to Ashes (2008)	Ashes to Ashes – Series 2 (2009)	Ashes to Ashes – Series 3 (2010)

Ashes to Ashes – Series 3

Soundtrack album by various artists
- Released: 12 April 2010
- Genre: Pop rock
- Label: Sony Music

Ashes to Ashes chronology
Ashes to Ashes – Series 2 (2009)	Ashes to Ashes – Series 3 (2010)

The soundtrack features contemporary songs by British groups of the period such as punk period survivors the Clash and the Stranglers, New Romantics such as Duran Duran and Ultravox, synthpop such as Jon & Vangelis, OMD, later period Roxy Music and the Passions' sole hit single, "I'm in Love with a German Film Star", from 1981. A scene in the second episode, "The Happy Day", set at The Blitz features Steve Strange playing himself performing "Fade to Grey" by Visage. The last episode in Series 1 ends with "Take the Long Way Home" from Supertramp's Breakfast in America 1979 album. Episode 2 also contains the classic Madness song "The Prince". The final episode of Series 3 plays out to David Bowie's "Heroes". Philip Glenister said that one of the reasons the series moved on to 1982 was due to running out of good songs and feared that they'd end up having to use Bucks Fizz's "The Land of Make Believe" (a brief snippet of the song is indeed used in the second series, as well as the same group's "Making Your Mind Up" being used in series one).

A CD soundtrack from the first series of the show was released on 17 March 2008; one from the second series of the show was released on 20 April 2009. A CD soundtrack from the third series of the show was released on 12 April 2010.

During the second and third series, 1980s background music (some of which had been used during the show) was available to UK digital TV viewers by using the red button immediately after the show. Clips from Top of the Pops, The Old Grey Whistle Test and other 1980s BBC TV music programmes, introduced by Philip Glenister in his guise as DCI Gene Hunt, were looped for the remainder of the evening of transmission.

=== Track listings ===
Ashes to Ashes: Original Soundtrack
No.	Title	Contributing artist	Length
1.	"Introduction: Monologue – Alex Drake"		0:17
2.	"Ashes to Ashes"	David Bowie	4:22
3.	"Fade to Grey"	Visage	3:48
4.	"Love Action (I Believe in Love)"	The Human League	3:50
5.	"Girls on Film"	Duran Duran	3:28
6.	"Geno"	Dexys Midnight Runners	3:27
7.	"Souvenir"	Orchestral Manoeuvres in the Dark	3:31
8.	"No More Heroes"	The Stranglers	3:27
9.	"I Fought the Law"	The Clash	2:40
10.	"(We Don't Need This) Fascist Groove Thang"	Heaven 17	4:19
11.	"Interlude: Dialogue – You're Nicked"		0:17
12.	"Gene Genie" (Gene Hunt's theme from Ashes to Ashes)	Edmund Butt	1:20
13.	"In Love with a German Film Star"	The Passions	3:58
14.	"Happy Birthday"	Altered Images	2:59
15.	"It's Different for Girls"	Joe Jackson	3:44
16.	"Money"	The Flying Lizards	2:31
17.	"Doors of Your Heart"	The Beat	3:47
18.	"Staring at the Rude Boys"	The Ruts	3:14
19.	"Reward"	The Teardrop Explodes	2:43
20.	"Swords of a Thousand Men"	Tenpole Tudor	2:55
21.	"Let's Stick Together"	Bryan Ferry	2:59
22.	"Vienna"	Ultravox	4:37
23.	"Title Music from 'Ashes to Ashes'"	Edmund Butt	0:54
24.	"Epilogue: Dialogue – Fandabydozy"		0:08
Total length:			63:55

Ashes to Ashes: Series 2 Original Soundtrack
No.	Title	Contributing artist	Length
1.	"Under Pressure"	Queen & David Bowie	4:04
2.	"Dialogue 'Alex Drake'"		0:14
3.	"Opening Titles"	Edmund Butt	0:53
4.	"Planet Earth"	Duran Duran	3:55
5.	"In the Air Tonight"	Phil Collins	5:28
6.	"Rat Race"	The Specials	3:08
7.	"Dialogue 'Vindaloo'"		0:16
8.	"Mirror Man"	The Human League	3:47
9.	"The Look of Love (Part 1)"	ABC	3:28
10.	"Going Back to My Roots"	Odyssey	5:24
11.	"Dialogue 'The Strangest Day'"		0:47
12.	"Alex's Theme"	Edmund Butt	1:50
13.	"Funeral Pyre"	The Jam	3:28
14.	"Temptation"	New Order	5:22
15.	"The Lunatics (Have Taken Over the Asylum)"	Fun Boy Three	3:13
16.	"The Back of Love"	Echo & the Bunnymen	3:13
17.	"Wishing (If I Had a Photograph of You)"	A Flock of Seagulls	4:09
18.	"Love Plus One"	Haircut One Hundred	3:32
19.	"Dialogue 'Felicity Kendal'"		0:28
20.	"Stand and Deliver"	Adam & the Ants	3:06
21.	"Lies"	Thompson Twins	3:10
22.	"Streets of London"	Anti Nowhere League	3:16
23.	"I Second That Emotion"	Japan	3:44
24.	"Everybody's Got to Learn Sometime"	The Korgis	4:05
25.	"Atomic"	Blondie	3:47
26.	"Epilogue 'Tea & Sympathy'"		0:24
27.	"Hunt's Theme"	Edmund Butt	1:04
Total length:			75:15

Ashes to Ashes: Series 3 Original Soundtrack
No.	Title	Contributing artist	Length
1.	"Dialogue: Alex Drake"		0:15
2.	"Opening Titles"	Edmund Butt	0:52
3.	"Let's Dance"	David Bowie	4:05
4.	"Mad World"	Tears for Fears	3:32
5.	"True"	Spandau Ballet	5:33
6.	"Only You"	Yazoo	3:08
7.	"Dialogue: Wake Up"		0:34
8.	"Gene Undercover"	Edmund Butt	1:14
9.	"Town Called Malice"	The Jam	2:51
10.	"Golden Brown"	The Stranglers	3:28
11.	"Uptown Girl"	Billy Joel	3:13
12.	"Dialogue: All in My Head"		0:24
13.	"Get Me Home"	Edmund Butt	1:56
14.	"Promised You a Miracle"	Simple Minds	3:56
15.	"Electric Avenue"	Eddy Grant	3:45
16.	"Girls Just Want to Have Fun"	Cyndi Lauper	3:47
17.	"Video Killed the Radio Star"	The Buggles	4:11
18.	"Couldn't Love You More"	John Martyn	3:03
19.	"The Kiss"	Edmund Butt	1:28
20.	"Dialogue: I'm in a Mess"		0:40
21.	"The Love Cats"	The Cure	3:38
22.	"The Cutter"	Echo & the Bunnymen	3:51
23.	"Shipbuilding"	Robert Wyatt	3:01
24.	"War Baby"	Tom Robinson	4:09
25.	"Rockit"	Herbie Hancock	3:39
26.	"Two Tribes"	Frankie Goes to Hollywood	3:24
Total length:			73:37

== Reception ==
=== Ratings ===
Based on overnight returns, The Guardian reported that audience figures for the 7 February 2008 broadcast of the first episode—in a 9 pm slot on the flagship channel, BBC One—were 7 million: about 29% of viewers. The figure was "in line with the final episode of Life on Mars in April last year, though well up on the earlier show's second series debut of 5.7 million two months earlier", but The Guardian noted "the heavy publicity blitz this week for Ashes to Ashes" as a factor in its success.

=== Critical reception ===
Critical reception to the first episode of the series was mixed, with positive reviews from The Daily Telegraph, The Herald, The Spectator, and the New Statesman, and negative reviews from The Times, The Sunday Times, Newsnight Review, The Guardian, and The Observer, which criticised the episode's direction, structure, and tone (although it did praise the costumes and art direction). The national free sheet, Metro, gave the episode four out of five as "a vote of faith" on what it described as "a dodgy start".

The Guardian reported on 15 February 2008 that, with 6.1 million viewers and a 25% audience share, the ratings for the second episode, shown on 14 February, were down by almost one million on the first, comparing overnight returns. It still did well against the Lynda La Plante police procedural Trial & Retribution, which fell to a series low on ITV. The fifth episode, broadcast 6 March 2008, attracted 6.6 million viewers according to overnight returns. With this episode, The Daily Telegraph stated that "Ashes to Ashes stepped out of the shadow of Life on Mars".

Hawes's performance was singled out by critics such as The Sun's Ally Ross, The Daily Mirror's Jim Shelley and The Guardian's Sam Wollaston. While Robert Maclaughlin, writing for Den of Geek, praised Hawes for "the ability to pull off a white leather coat, perm and very, very tight jeans", other critics were negative; Ross blamed the character of Alex Drake for "ruining nearly every scene". Wollaston went further, writing "Keeley Hawes, as DI Alex Drake, is awful. She may be totally shagworthy and have a cracking pair of puppies (those are one of Hunt's sidekick's words, not mine, before you start complaining), but, as a copper, even a psychologist copper, she's very unconvincing." Philip Glenister defended his co-star, stating, "It's a hellishly difficult thing to come into and I've seen how hard she works and how brilliant she is. To all those detractors, they're just plain wrong." Hawes sent all her critics flowers.

Entertainment news website Digital Spy praised the show's return, with cult editor Ben Rawson-Jones describing the opening episode of the second series as "greatly promising". It was watched by 7.01 million viewers.

The second series was nominated for the TV Dagger at the 2009 Crime Thriller Awards. Keeley Hawes and Philip Glenister received nominations in the Best Actress and Best Actor categories respectively.

The finale of Ashes To Ashes, which finished in 2010, has been described by Dean Andrews as "genius". He explained on GMTV: "Everything is tied up. You get all of the answers from Life on Mars and Ashes To Ashes."

When interviewed by SFX Magazine in May 2010, Matthew Graham spoke of teasing the BBC with a third set of series called The Laughing Gnome (the title, an early song by David Bowie, suggests a prequel set in the 1960s), and claimed that they made "the whole title page and copyrighted it and everything". He said the BBC responded well to the joke, replying "Yeah, it's commissioned!".

The series three finale was watched by 6.45 million viewers.

Sam Wollaston called the series a nostalgia fest. Other journalists also commented on nostalgia in the series.

=== Accolades ===
Year	Award	Category	Nominee(s)	Result	Ref.
2008	Crime Thriller Awards	Best TV Drama, Serial or Season	Ashes to Ashes	Nominated	
2008	Crime Thriller Awards	Best Leading Actress	Keeley Hawes	Nominated	
2008	Crime Thriller Awards	Best Leading Actor	Philip Glenister	Nominated	
2008	Geneva International Film Festival – Tous Écrans	Best International Television Series	Ashes to Ashes	Won	
2008	Monte-Carlo Television Festival	Outstanding Actor – Drama Series	Dean Andrews	Nominated	
2008	Monte-Carlo Television Festival	Outstanding Actor – Drama Series	Philip Glenister	Nominated	
2008	Monte-Carlo Television Festival	Outstanding Actor – Drama Series	Marshall Lancaster	Nominated	
2008	Monte-Carlo Television Festival	Outstanding Actress – Drama Series	Keeley Hawes	Nominated	
2008	Monte-Carlo Television Festival	Outstanding Actress – Drama Series	Montserrat Lombard	Nominated	
2008	National Television Awards	Outstanding Drama Performance	Philip Glenister	Nominated	
2008	TV Quick and Choice Awards	Best New Drama	Ashes to Ashes	Won	
2008	TV Quick and Choice Awards	Best Actor	Philip Glenister	Nominated	
2008	TV Quick and Choice Awards	Best Actress	Keeley Hawes	Nominated	
2008	Writers' Guild of Great Britain Awards	Television Drama Series	Ashes to Ashes	Nominated	

== Cultural impact ==
In 2010, the Labour Party used an edited image of Gene Hunt on the Quattro with David Cameron's face as part of its general election campaign, with the words "Don't let him take Britain back to the 1980s". The slogan links the Conservative leader with memories of social unrest and youth unemployment. In response to this, the Conservatives posted a slightly modified version of the image with the words "Fire up the Quattro. It's time for Change. Vote for Change. Vote Conservative." Subsequently, Kudos Productions—which owns the copyright to the Gene Hunt character—wrote to both parties requiring them to cease using the image.

Philip Glenister was introduced to David Cameron, future UK Prime Minister, at the 2009 Police Bravery Awards. Glenister explained that Gene Hunt was popular with real police officers because he spent his time catching criminals rather than doing paperwork. He later quipped 'Six months later, he's (Cameron) on Radio 5 Live saying exactly what I've just said. Bastard nicked my line!"

== DVD releases ==
Title	Region 2	Region 4	Episodes
Ashes to Ashes: The Complete Series One	5 May 2008	1 October 2009	1–8
Ashes to Ashes: The Complete Series Two	13 July 2009	5 January 2010	9–16
Ashes to Ashes: The Complete Series Three	5 July 2010	6 October 2011	17–24
