= Thirty Thousand Feet Over China =

Studio album by the Passions
- Released: 18 September 1981
- Studio: Surrey Sound (Surrey); Polydor (London)
- Genre: New wave
- Label: Polydor
- Producer: Nigel Gray, Pete Wilson, the Passions

The Passions chronology
Michael & Miranda (1980)	Thirty Thousand Feet Over China (1981)	Sanctuary (1982)

Professional ratings
Review scores
Source	Rating
AllMusic	4/5 stars
Smash Hits	8.5/10
Trouser Press	favourable

Thirty Thousand Feet Over China is the second studio album by English post-punk/new wave band the Passions, released 18 September 1981 by Polydor Records. It reached No. 92 in the UK Albums Chart. It contains the group's hit single "I'm in Love with a German Film Star".

== Track listing ==
All tracks are written by Barbara Gogan, Richard Williams, David Wardill, and Clive Timperley, except "Someone Special" and "Bachelor Girls", written by Gogan, Williams, Timperley, and Claire Bidwell.

Side one
No.	Title	Length
1.	"I'm in Love with a German Film Star"	4:01
2.	"Someone Special"	4:07
3.	"The Swimmer"	3:32
4.	"Strange Affair"	3:29
5.	"Small Stones"	5:37

Side two
No.	Title	Length
1.	"Runaway"	3:04
2.	"The Square"	3:30
3.	"Alice's Song"	3:12
4.	"Bachelor Girls"	2:21
5.	"Skin Deep"	4:19

== Personnel ==
Credits adapted from LP liner notes.

The Passions

- Barbara Gogan – vocals, guitar; piano (5)
- Richard Williams – percussion
- David Agar – bass, vocals; guitar (5), extra percussion (10)
- Clive Timperley – guitars, vocals; piano (2)

Technical

- Nigel Gray – producer (2, 4–10)
- Pete Wilson – producer (1, 3)
- The Passions – producers (3)
- Martin Moss – engineer
- Pete Buhlmann – engineer
- Rob O'Connor – design, art direction
- Jeff Veitch – photography

== Charts ==
Weekly chart performance for Thirty Thousand Feet Over China
Chart (1981)	Peak position
New Zealand Albums (RMNZ)	49
UK Albums (OCC)	91
