= MADS Theatre =

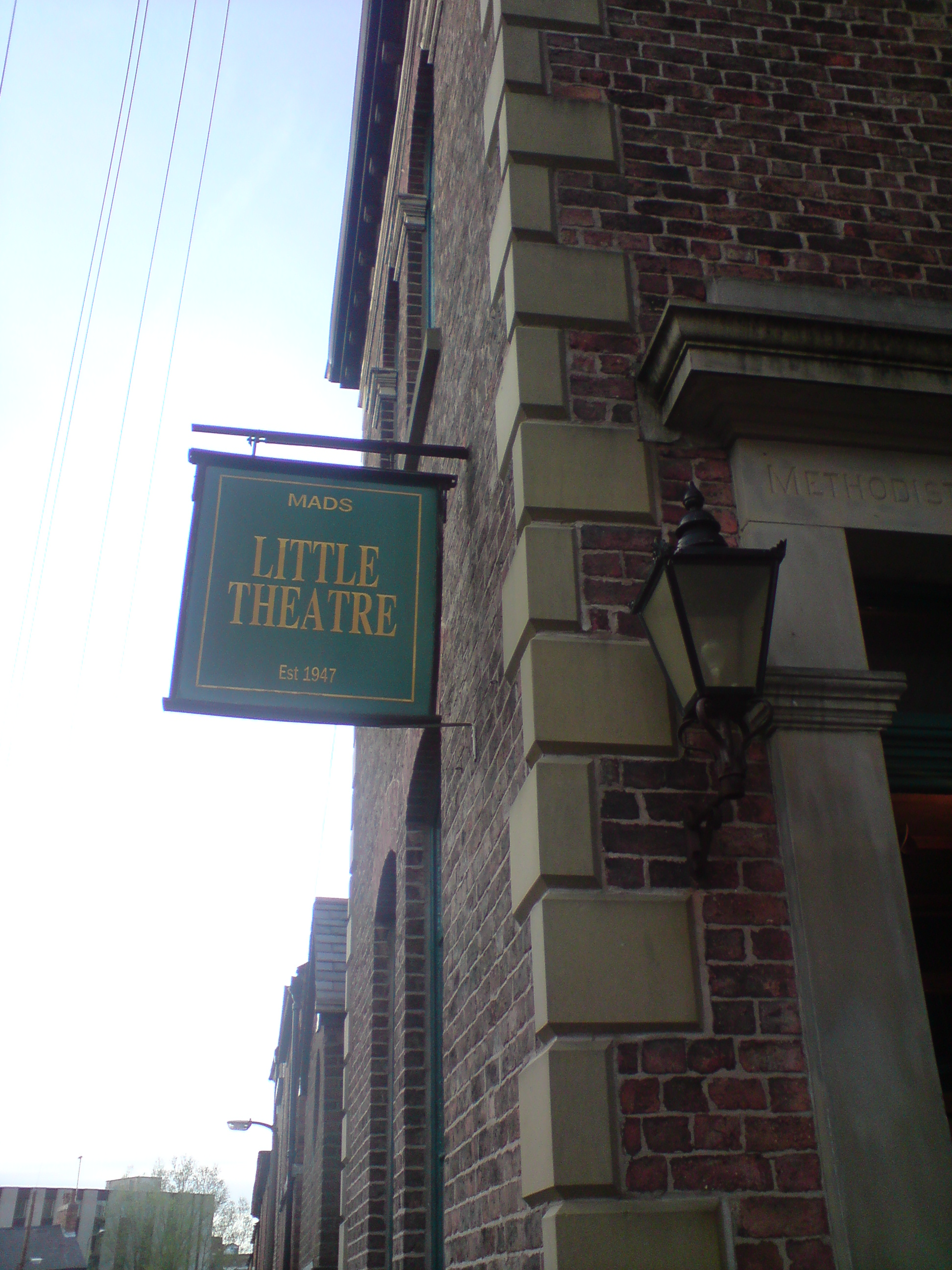
- Exterior of MADS Theatre on Lord Street since 1954
- Interactive map of MADS Theatre
- Address: Lord Street Macclesfield Cheshire; United Kingdom
- Type: Local

Construction
- Opened: 15 October 1947; 78 years ago

MADS Theatre (Macclesfield Amateur Dramatic Society) is a theatre in the town of Macclesfield, Cheshire, England.

== History ==
The theatre was founded on 15 October 1947 and since then has produced hundreds of productions. The location originally hosting a Sunday School in Lord Street built in 1822 still has the inscription over the main theatre entrance bearing the date of the first building on the site.

Following having to move to the ground floor in 1976 due to fire regulations, it was decided in 1980 to rebuild the theatre. The rebuilt theatre was opened on 16 May 1984 by Nicholas Winterton MP for Macclesfield.

== Notable productions ==
In 2016 MADS Theatre company performed six short plays by Tennessee Williams, also in 2016 MADS took part in Barnaby Festival.

At the 2016 British All Winners Drama festival held at the Hertford Theatre MADS production of The Hound of the Baskervilles by Sir Arthur Conan Doyle, adapted by Steve Canny & John Nicholson won the Felixstowe Festival Trophy (Adjudicator's Award) and the Sydney Fisher Trophy (Backstage Trophy).

In 2017, MADS' production of Jerusalem by Jez Butterworth won best production at the Greater Manchester Drama Festival (GMDF).

Marshall Lancaster and Jonathon Morris have been members.
