= PragVEC =

British post-punk band

- Origin: London, England
- Genre: Post-punk
- Years active: 1978–1981
- Past members: Susan Gogan; John Studholme; David Boyd; Nicholas Cash

PragVEC was a post-punk band from London formed in 1978. The band name was a contraction of the two words "pragmatism" and "vector", chosen at random.

== History ==
PragVEC were formed in February 1978 by ex-Derelicts members Susan Gogan (vocals, synthesizer) and John Studholme guitar, synthesizer, along with David Boyd (bass) and Nicholas Cash (drums).

On 16 October 1978, they released their debut EP, the four-song 7-inch Bits, on their own Spec Records label. It was followed on 10 July 1979 by the "Expert" single. Both records were compiled on an eponymous 12-inch EP issued on the French label Celluloid Records.

PragVEC played concerts during 1978 and 1979, opening for bands such as Cabaret Voltaire, Scritti Politti, the Psychedelic Furs, the Monochrome Set, Au Pairs, Magazine, Chelsea, Stiff Little Fingers and the Teardrop Explodes.

During their short existence, they also recorded a total of three sessions for the John Peel programme. The last of these showed them moving away from the guitar-based sound of the first EP towards the use of the Wasp, a battery-powered portable synthesizer with a built-in speaker. Two of the songs, "Rural Erotic" and "Third Person", were re-recorded for the No-Cowboys album, released in December 1980. Packaged in a polythene bag, the record was presented as a compilation by various bands, although all of the material was recorded by PragVEC.

The band split in 1981, with Cash joining Fad Gadget and the Lines. Studholme and Gogan joined the Atoms. Jim Thirlwell, who had contributed Wasp synth to No-Cowboys, went on to form Foetus.

Studholme, who had co-written many of the band's songs with Gogan, died in November 2005 after a long illness. Around the time of his death, he, Gogan and Cash had been working with Mute Records to compile a reissue of PragVEC material.

== In popular culture ==
Half Man Half Biscuit recorded a song "Prag VEC at the Melkweg", on their 1991 album McIntyre, Treadmore and Davitt.

== Personnel ==
Former members

- Susan Gogan – vocals, synthesizer
- John Studholme – guitar, synthesizer
- David Boyd – bass
- Nick Cash – drums

Guest studio members

- John Glyn - tenor sax
- Art Moran - alto sax
- Jim Thirlwell - synthesizer, vocals

== Discography ==
=== Studio albums ===
- No-Cowboys (1980, Spec Records)

=== Singles and EPs ===
- Bits 7-inch EP (1978, Spec Records)
- "Expert" 7-inch single (1979, Spec Records)
- PragVEC 12-inch EP (1979, Celluloid Records)
