= The 101ers =

British pub rock band

- Origin: London, England
- Genres: Pub rock; proto-punk
- Years active: 1974–1976, 2003
- Labels: Chiswick; Andalucia; Big Beat; SMS; EMI; Astralwerks
- Past members: John "Woody" Mellor; Clive Timperley; Dan Kelleher; Richard Dudanski; Simon Cassell; Álvaro Peña-Rojas; Antonio Narvaez; Julian Yewdall; Tymon Dogg; Marwood "Mole" Chesterton; Patrick Nother; Martin Stone

The 101ers were a pub rock band from the 1970s playing mostly in a rockabilly garage band rhythm and blues style, notable as being the band that Joe Strummer left to join the Clash. Formed in London in May 1974, the 101ers made their performing debut on 7 September at the Telegraph pub in Brixton, under the name 'El Huaso and the 101 All Stars'. The name would later be shortened to the '101 All Stars' and finally just the '101ers'. The group played at free festivals such as Stonehenge, and established themselves on the London pub rock circuit prior to the advent of punk.

== History ==
The group was named after the squat where they lived together: 101 Walterton Road, Maida Vale, although it was for a time rumoured that they were named for "Room 101", the infamous torture room in George Orwell's novel Nineteen Eighty-Four.

The band's early gigs included several at the Windsor Castle and a residency at the Elgin. They were supported by the Sex Pistols at the Nashville Room on 3 April 1976. Strummer claims that this is when he saw the light and got involved in the punk scene. Joe Strummer commented on this event in the Don Letts documentary Westway to the World on the end of the 101ers by saying "5 seconds into their (the Pistols') first song, I knew we were like yesterday's paper, we were over."

By the time their debut single, "Keys to Your Heart", was released, Joe Strummer had joined The Clash and the 101ers were no more. Clive Timperley later joined The Passions, Dan Kelleher went to Martian Schoolgirls and The Derelicts. Richard Dudanski went on to work with The Raincoats, Basement 5 and Public Image Ltd. Tymon Dogg worked with Strummer briefly in The Clash, playing fiddle and singing his original song, "Lose This Skin", on Sandinista!, and later in The Mescaleros.

I know the 101ers were good. In fact, as far as sound and excitement went we were much better than Eddie and the Hot Rods. The other guys in the group were twenty-five and twenty-six and they played good because they'd spent a few years getting that far. But they were just too old. What I really wanted was to get in with some young yobbo's who I was more in tune with.

— Joe Strummer

The 101ers' recorded output was initially limited to one single. However, by 1981, interest in The Clash was at its height and a second single and a compilation album Elgin Avenue Breakdown was released. Several of the tracks on the latter album were live recordings, and there is no evidence that the band ever conceived of these recordings as a full-length album.

Until his death in 2002, Joe Strummer had been planning to re-release Elgin Avenue Breakdown, complete with previously unreleased tracks that would encompass everything the band ever recorded. The project was completed with the help of Strummer's widow Lucinda Tait and former drummer Richard Dudanski, and released in May 2005 as Elgin Avenue Breakdown Revisited via Astralwerks in the US and EMI in Europe. The last track on the 2005 re-issue was an 8-minute version of "Gloria" recorded on 22 May 1976 at the Cellar Club in Bracknell. This was recorded two weeks before the 101ers finally split. Joe Strummer joined The Clash who played their first gig at the Black Swan, Sheffield supporting the Sex Pistols on 4 July 1976.

== Covers ==
The Clash had played "Keys to Your Heart" live at around the same time it was reissued as a single. The Hypertonics have also covered this song.

== Line-up ==
- John "Woody" Mellor aka Joe Strummer – guitar, vocals
- Clive Timperley – guitar, vocals
- Dan Kelleher – bass, guitar, keyboards and lead and backing vocals plus arrangements and production
- Richard Dudanski – drums
- Simon Cassell aka "Big John" – saxophone
- Álvaro Peña-Rojas – saxophone
- Marwood Chesterton aka "Mole" – bass guitar (until Oct. 1975)
- Antonio Narvaez – drums
- Julian Yewdall – vocals, harmonica
- Patrick Nother – bass (first gig)
- Martin Stone – lead guitar (final gig)
- Tymon Dogg – fiddle, vocals

== Discography ==
Singles / EPs

- "Keys to Your Heart" b/w "5 Star Rock & Roll Petrol" (Chiswick Records, 1976; Big Beat Records, 1979)
- "Sweet Revenge" b/w "Rabies" (Big Beat Records, 1981)
- "Keys to Your Heart" (4-track EP) (SMS Records, 1974)
- "1976" (4-track EP) (Chiswick Records, 1976)

Compilations

- Elgin Avenue Breakdown (Andalucia Records, 1981)
- Five Star Rock'n'Roll (Made In Heaven, 1993)
- Elgin Avenue Breakdown Revisited (Astralwerks/EMI, 2005; Andalucia Records/Parlophone, 2015)
