= Barbara Gogan =

- Born: Dublin, Ireland
- Genres: Post-punk, new wave, experimental, ambient, electronic
- Occupations: Musician, singer, songwriter, composer
- Instruments: Vocals, guitar
- Years active: 1970s–present
- Labels: Fiction, Polydor, Secret Lovers Records
- Website: barbaragogan.bandcamp.com

Barbara Gogan is a musician, singer, songwriter, and composer, best known as the lead vocalist and guitarist of the post-punk band the Passions. She co-wrote and performed their 1981 single "I'm in Love with a German Film Star", which reached No. 25 on the UK Singles Chart. Gogan was an early participant in the London punk scene in the mid-1970s. After the Passions disbanded in 1983, Gogan launched a solo and collaborative career exploring experimental, ambient, and electronic music, working with Hector Zazou on projects such as Sahara Blue (1992), Songs from the Cold Seas, and Made on Earth (1997), and releasing her solo album Wheels/Ruedas (2002).

In the 2020s she formed the electronic duo Barbara+Marco with Italian musician Marco Dianese, releasing the albums Fellow Alliances (2023), Bench (2024), and Eikasia (2025).

== Early life and career ==
Gogan was born in Dublin, Ireland. She left Dublin at age 18 and studied art while living in France, before relocating to London in 1972. Members of the nascent punk scene recognized her as a musician with feminist credentials, alongside peers from the Derelicts and pragVEC. She later co-founded the Passions, a post-punk band active in the late 1970s and early 1980s. In London, she also co-formed the band the Derelicts with her sister, Sue Gogan, and drummer Richard Williams. The band became part of a network of feminist and leftist music groups that challenged the male-dominated structures of the music industry and the emerging punk movement.

== The Passions (1978–1983) ==
The Passions, which was formed in 1978 as "The Youngsters" by Claire Bidwell, Richard Williams, Dack Dyde, Mitch Barker and Gogan, released three studio albums.

Vocalist, bass guitarist, and songwriter Claire Bidwell left the band in 1980 and was replaced by David Agar. Gogan then took over lead vocals and lyric writing. Their best-known single, "I'm in Love with a German Film Star", was inspired by Steve "Roadent" Connelly, a roadie for the Clash and the Sex Pistols. The band toured extensively in the UK and Europe, including headlining along with the Cure on the Future Pastimes Tour (1980). Critics praised Gogan's lyrics and vocal delivery, with Loud Women describing her vocals on Thirty Thousand Feet Over China as "haunted [and] soaring" and noting the album's "evocative, impressionistic" qualities. In her 2019 feminist history of punk, Vivien Goldman mentions the Passions alongside contemporaries such as the Slits, the Raincoats, and the Mo-Dettes.

== Solo work and collaborations ==
After the Passions disbanded, Gogan relocated to New York City and later France, furthering her career in experimental, ambient, and electronic music.

She was a guest artist on French composer Hector Zazou's 1992 project Sahara Blue, which featured multiple experimental and world-music artists. She contributed vocals and co-wrote two songs on the album. In 1997, she collaborated with Zazou on the album Made on Earth, released on Crammed Discs. The record blended Zazou's ambient soundscapes with Gogan's guitar, vocals and lyrics. NPR's All Things Considered praised the album as "a CD of smart lyrics and intricately produced sounds", with critic Charles de Ledesma highlighting Gogan's "intimate vocals" as central to the work.

Gogan contributed lyrics to Sara Lee's 2000 solo album Make It Beautiful, which featured songwriting by other notable artists including Ani DiFranco and Emily Saliers. The album received coverage in Billboard.

Gogan produced and recorded her solo album Wheels/Ruedas (2002) across multiple countries. In 2021, she released the tracks "Horizon", featuring Tuvan throat singer Albert Kuvezin, and "Crazy Bird". Gogan performed as a guest on Lene Lovich's 2019 UK tour.

== Barbara+Marco (2020–present) ==
Since 2020, Gogan has collaborated with Italian musician Marco Dianese in the duo Barbara+Marco. In 2020–2021, they released a number of singles that would later become part of their first full-length album, Sonic Garden Experience, released on 1 June 2022.

In February 2023, Barbara+Marco released their collaborative album Fellow Alliances through Secret Lovers Records. Barbara+Marco composed sixteen tracks and invited musicians worldwide to reinterpret or expand on the material. Gogan co-produced and contributed vocals and instrumentation, while Marco co-produced and contributed instrumentation across all tracks as well. Contributors included Kirsten Morrison, Laura Martin, and Johanna Moffitt. A single from the album, "America - Remix", featuring Barbara Gogan and Marco Dianese, was released separately in September 2024.

In 2024, Gogan and Dianese composed soundscapes for Conduit, an exhibition by artist Doug Safranek at the Sugar Hill Children's Museum of Art & Storytelling in New York. The Brooklyn Rail highlighted how the interplay of visual and audio elements created a symbiotic experience for visitors.

Their recent albums include Bench (February 2024) and Eikasia (March 2025). In a review for Sherwood.it, Andrea De Rocco described Eikasia as "a complex work that requires a certain kind of attentive, yet relaxed, listening" (translation from Italian), highlighting its "fundamental electronic component" and the way it "interacts perfectly with Barbara Gogan’s guitar and vocal contributions" to create intimate sonic refuges beyond everyday distractions. The track "Playtime" was premiered by Klubikon, highlighting the album's immersive and evocative soundscapes.

== Critical response ==
The Irish Independent profiled Gogan in 1977, noting her critique of sexism in rock and reporting that her band was preparing to play a series of benefit performances for the feminist magazine Spare Rib. Music historian Matthew Worley notes that she was among the musicians of the period recognized for their feminist credentials, while The Oxford Handbook of Punk Rock likewise highlights her role in bringing feminist perspectives into the post-punk movement.

Music journalist and critic Greil Marcus noted he could hear Barbara Gogan's Passions in the album The New Life by the Irish band Girls Names. NPR music critic Charles de Ledesma described Gogan’s “smart lyrics and intimate vocals” as central to her later collaboration with experimental electronic musician Hector Zazou on their album Made on Earth. Doug Brod of The New York Times called the Passions’ hit “one of the most ravishing pop songs in any genre” and praised its “gentle, breathy vocals” and “waves of glistening guitar work” in a 2020 article about women-led new wave and post-punk bands,

In an NME feature on "Women in Rock", Gogan expressed frustration that many women musicians were afraid of being labeled a feminist, highlighting her advocacy for stronger female representation in post-punk music. According to Helen Reddington, female musicians in the late 1970s punk scene faced sexism and aggressive audiences, and developed distinctive forms of assertiveness. She cites Barbara Gogan as an example of this, using punk to express emotion and navigate male-dominated spaces.

== Covers and appearances ==
The Passions' single "I'm in Love with a German Film Star" appeared on the soundtrack of Grand Theft Auto: Vice City Stories (2006). The song was also covered in 2008 by artist and filmmaker Sam Taylor-Johnson, with production by the Pet Shop Boys.

== Dance and other work ==
Gogan contributed live music for performances by LAVA, a feminist acrobatic dance company based in Brooklyn and Calicoon, New York. Performances she has composed for include Intimacy Creates, collaborating with choreographers and integrating live instrumentation with movement.

== Discography ==
=== With the Passions ===
- Michael & Miranda (1980, Fiction Records)
- Thirty Thousand Feet Over China (1981, Polydor Records)
- Sanctuary (1982, Polydor Records)
- Ignite (1983, Polydor Records)

=== Collaborations ===
- Sahara Blue (with Hector Zazou, 1992, Crammed Discs)
- Made on Earth (with Hector Zazou, 1997, Crammed Discs)

=== Solo ===
- Wheels/Ruedas (2002)
- Selected tracks: "Horizon" (2021), "Crazy Bird" (2021)

=== With Barbara+Marco ===
- Singles (2021–2022), (Secret Lovers Records)
- Fellow Alliances (2023), (Secret Lovers Records)
- Bench (February 2024, (Secret Lovers Records)
- Eikasia (March 2025, (Secret Lovers Records)
