= The Art Attacks =

English punk band

- Origin: London
- Genres: Punk rock
- Years active: 1977–1979

The Art Attacks were an English punk band from April 1977 to March 1978.

Their songs released as singles were "I am a Dalek"/"Neutron Bomb" and "Punk Rock Stars"/"Rat City". The group was formed by Edwin Pouncey and Steve Spear, two students from the Royal College of Art, London for a one-off gig at the college. They were asked to do a gig at Wimbledon College of Art and this led to the band's short career. They had two tracks on the Live at the Vortex (NEMS) compilation album, ("Frankensteins Heartbeat" and "Animal Bondage") and one on the Streets (Beggars Banquet Records) compilation album, ("Arabs in Arrads"). They played at most of the London punk club and pub venues including The Marquee, Nashville and Vortex supporting bands like Generation X, 999, The Motors and The Lurkers. They also played out of town at venues in the south and north east of England. Their tracks have turned up on various punk compilations over the years and were collected and released with a bootleg live recording on the Outrage and Horror album (Overground Records).

In the initial rehearsals and demo Rick Slaughter was on drums (later in The Motors) and Rob Smith on bass. For a time Robert Gotobed (later Wire) was on drums and played on the track "Rat City". The band eventually became:

- Edwin Pouncey (a.k.a. Savage Pencil) – Vocals
- M.S (Marion Fudger ex of The Derelicts) – Bass
- Steve Spear- Guitar
- JD Haney – Drums (later with The Monochrome Set)

== Tagmemics ==
After the Art Attacks ended the members of the group worked using the name Tagmemics. They played one gig supporting The Monochrome Set in 1979 and recorded the single "Take Your Brain Out For a Walk", on LAX records in 1980. The single was played on the Dr. Demento Show by special guest DJ Mark Mothersbaugh of Devo (in character as Booji Boy) on 19 October 1980. Mothersbaugh said before playing the single "this one's from a band from London, they don't ever play anywhere, they just kind of play in their bedroom or livingroom or something. It's a funny band because nobody in the band weighs less than 250 pounds."
