= Montserrat Lombard =

British actress

- Born: Montserrat Lombard; 1 August 1982 (age 44); London, England, UK
- Occupation: Actress
- Years active: 1997–present

Montserrat Lombard (born 1 August 1982) is a British actress known for playing Sharon 'Shaz' Granger in the BBC drama series Ashes to Ashes.

== Early life ==
Lombard was born in London and is of Spanish and Italian descent. She speaks Spanish, Italian, and English.

== Career ==
Her television credits include regular roles in Love Soup (2005–2008) and Roman's Empire (2007). She is probably best known for her role as WPC Shaz Granger in the BBC drama Ashes to Ashes (2008–2010).

Other credits include guest roles in Doctors, Twisted Tales, Nathan Barley, Murder in Suburbia ("Witches", as a school girl named Myra who, among other things, bakes brownies and attempts to seduce her music teacher dressed in lacy underwear), and a part in the feature-length ITV drama Tunnel Of Love. Lombard has also played Lavya in the episodes "Hello Queppu" and "Artefact" of the BBC Two sci-fi comedy series Hyperdrive, and Stevie in the fourth episode of the BBC Two comedy Saxondale. She appeared as Lady Anne in the BBC Radio 4 comedy The Castle, and has appeared in several stage productions, including People Who Don't Do Dinner Parties.

Lombard played June in the short film Vanilla Song, created by National Film and Television School students, as well as Ian Sciacaluga's short film noir, Imbroglio. She played The Muse in William Mager's 2008 short film, Stiletto, funded by Apex Arts and the Hitchcock Production Fund. She had a small role in Terry Gilliam's The Imaginarium of Doctor Parnassus. In 2009, she worked on the film St Trinian's II: The Legend of Fritton's Gold, playing Zoe, the Emo.

She played Maria in the premiere episode of the 2011 TV series, The Borgias. She voiced the role of Mirania in the 2011–12 game The Last Story for Nintendo Wii.

She appeared in ITV's Marple: A Caribbean Mystery in 2013 as Esther Walters. From September 2013 to January 2014 she starred alongside Lee Evans and Sheila Hancock in Barking in Essex at the Wyndhams Theatre.

In May 2016 she appeared on BBC Two in Ben Elton's comedy Upstart Crow as Shakespeare's dark lady muse Emelia (series 1 episode 4, and in October 2018 reprised the role in series 3 episode 6). In March 2017 she appeared in Private View, the series 3 finale of Inside No. 9 on BBC Two as a sarcastic waitress, Bea. Also in 2016 she appeared as different characters in Neil Gaiman's Likely Stories, a series of short films for Sky Arts directed by Iain Forsyth and Jane Pollard and scored by Jarvis Cocker. In 2019, she voices Mia on Thomas and Friends in US/UK versions. In 2023 she played Gwen Tyler in the BBC series Beyond Paradise, and, in 2024, played Jess in the film "Tyger."

== Filmography ==
=== Film ===
Year	Title	Role	Notes
2003	London Sonnet	Young Lovers – Girl	Short film
2005	Vanilla Song	June	Short film
2005	Imbroglio		Short film
2007	English Language (with English Subtitles)	Backing Vox & Tambourine	Short film
2008	Stiletto	The Muse	Short film
2008	Scratch	Susan	Short film
2009	The Imaginarium of Doctor Parnassus	Sally's Friend	
2009	Stalking Ben Chadz	Izzy	Short film
2009	Finding Sol	Mia	Short film
2009	St. Trinian's 2: The Legend of Fritton's Gold	Zoe	
2010	The Savage Canvas	Jill Saunders	Short film
2010	Magpie	Minnie	Short film
2012	8 Minutes Idle	Alice	
2012	Outside Bet	Becka	
2012	Tower Block	Jenny	
2013	Albatross: A Love Story		Short film
2013	Charlie Countryman	Madison	Uncredited
2014	I Remember You	Penny	Short film
2016	Bliss!	Karen Robson	
2017	The Ministry of Stories Anthology	Vampire	
2017	Altered	Cynthia	Short film
2017	To Wendy Who Kicked Me When I Said I Love You	Wendy	Short film
2019	Rare Beasts	Val	
2019	Thomas & Friends: Digs and Discoveries	Mia, Passengers (voices)	UK/US versions
2024	Tyger	Jess	
2024	Just Kids	Ben's Mother	Short film

=== Television ===
Year	Title	Role	Notes
2002	Doctors	Natalia	Episode: "Occupational Hazards"
2004	Tunnel of Love	Natalie	Television Movie
2005	Nathan Barley	Monika	Episode 6
2005–2008	Love Soup	Milly Russell	Main Cast; 17 Episodes
2007	Midsomer Murders	Philomena Bell	Episode: "Picture of Innocence"
2007, 2008	Hyperdrive	Lavya	2 Episodes
2008–2010	Ashes to Ashes	Sharon "Shaz" Granger	Main Cast; 24 Episodes
2014	A Touch of Cloth	Blue	2 Episodes
2016, 2018	Upstart Crow	Emilia Lanier	Guest Star; 2 Episodes
2017	Inside No. 9	Bea	Episode: "Private View"
2019–present	Thomas & Friends	Mia (voice)	UK/US Versions
2019	Soon Gone: A Windrush Chronicle	Samantha	TV Mini Series
2022	The Man Who Fell to Earth	Ashleigh Fiore	2 Episodes
2023	Beyond Paradise	Gwen Taylor	Episode 1
2025	The Death of Bunny Munro	Esme	2 Episodes
2026	The Marlow Murder Club	Una	2 Episodes
2026	Not Going Out	Saffron	1 Episode
