= Marshall Lancaster =

British actor

- Born: 5 October 1974 (age 51); Macclesfield, Cheshire, England
- Occupation: Actor
- Years active: 2000–2012
- Known for: Life on Mars (2006–2007); Ashes to Ashes (2008–2010); Doctor Who (2011)
- Height: 5 ft 7 in (1.70 m)

Marshall Lancaster (born 5 October 1974) is an English former actor. He has appeared in television dramas including Coronation Street, Holby City, The Lakes and Family Affairs. He is best known for playing DC Chris Skelton in the BBC time-travel police dramas, Life on Mars (2006–2007) and Ashes to Ashes (2008–2010), the former set in 1973, and the latter set between 1981 and 1983.

Lancaster is a former member of the Macclesfield-based theatre groups SCAMPS Youth Company, Paragon Youth Theatre and Macclesfield Amateur Dramatic Society. Until 23 August 2008 he starred in the York Theatre Royal's production of Mike Kenny's adaptation of The Railway Children alongside Colin Tarrant and Sarah Quintrell at the National Railway Museum. Lancaster has one green and one blue eye, a condition known as heterochromia. In January 2013 he started his own construction company, Marshall Lancaster Plastering, and works as a contractor in Macclesfield and surrounding areas.

== Credits ==
=== Television ===
| Year | Title | Role | Notes |
|---|---|---|---|
| 1999 | The Lakes | Ged Hodgson | 8 episodes |
| 1999 | Where the Heart Is | Matty | Episode: "Reach for the Stars" |
| 1999 | Shockers: Ibiza – £99 Return | Shaun | TV movie |
| 2000 | Peak Practice | Paul Lynch | Episode: "Once Too Often" |
| 2000–2001 | Bob Martin | Timmy | 12 episodes |
| 2001 | So What Now? | Dispatch Assistant | Episode: "Sofa So Good" |
| 2002–2003 | Clocking Off | Gary Dugdale | 10 episodes |
| 2003 | Grease Monkeys | Brian/Ryan Wright | Episode: "Double Vision" |
| 2004 | The Royal | Matty | Episode: "All the Fun of the Fair" |
| 2004 | Family Affairs | Shane | 3 episodes |
| 2004 | Outlaws | Jamie Hughes | Episode: "Three Monkeys" |
| 1999–2006 | Holby City | Ryan Livingstone/Jay Matthews/Billy Wintergreen | 4 episodes |
| 2006 | The Street | Colin | Episode: "Stan" |
| 2006 | The Bill | Paul Pavese | Episode: "417" |
| 2006–2007 | Life on Mars | Chris Skelton | 16 episodes |
| 2009 | Boy Meets Girl | Pete | TV mini-series |
| 2006–2009 | Coronation Street | Slug | 19 episodes |
| 2008–2010 | Ashes to Ashes | Chris Skelton | 24 episodes |
| 2006–2010 | Doctors | Alan Lords/Johnny Thomas | 2 episodes |
| 2011 | Doctor Who | Buzzer Edwards | Episodes: "The Rebel Flesh"/"The Almost People" |
| 2007–2012 | Casualty | Perry Dans/Keith Parr | 5 episodes |

=== Radio ===
| Year | Title | Role | Notes |
|---|---|---|---|
| 2006 | Daybreak | Phil | BBC Radio 4 Play |
| 2011 | Castaway | Tom | BBC Radio 4 Play |

=== Film ===
| Year | Title | Role | Notes |
|---|---|---|---|
| 2000 | Aberdeen | Moose | |
| 2000 | The Wedding Tackle | Chief with Chops | |

=== Theatre ===
| Year | Title | Role | Notes |
|---|---|---|---|
| 1992 | Where Did You Last See Your Trousers | Gorillagram | MADS Theatre |
| 1993 | Blood Brothers | Eddie | MADS Theatre |
| 1995 | Cabaret | Herr Schultz | Paragon Youth Theatre |
| 2007 | Up 'n' Under | Tony | Tameside Hippodrome Theatre |
| 2007 | Wuthering Heights | Linton | York Theatre Royal |
| 2008 | The Railway Children | Mr Perks | National Railway Museum |
