= I'm in Love with a German Film Star =

Single by The Passions

from the album Thirty Thousand Feet Over China
- B-side: "(Don't Talk to Me) I'm Shy"
- Released: 23 January 1981
- Genre: Post-punk; new wave
- Length: 3:57
- Label: Polydor
- Songwriter: The Passions
- Producer: Peter Wilson

The Passions singles chronology
"Swimmer" (1980)	"I'm in Love with a German Film Star" (1981)	"Skin Deep" (1981)

Official audio
- "I'm in Love with a German Film Star" on YouTube

"I'm in Love with a German Film Star" is a post-punk song by British band the Passions. It was released as a single by Polydor Records on 23 January 1981, and reached No. 25 on the UK Singles Chart. It was the band's only charting single. The song was later included on the band's second album, Thirty Thousand Feet Over China (1981).

The lyrics were written by the band's vocalist Barbara Gogan about Steve "Roadent" Connelly, a one-time roadie for the Clash and Sex Pistols, who had minor roles in several German films and played the Joker in the 1978 miniseries Das Ding.

The song features Clive Timperley's Echoplex guitar.

The song is featured in the 2006 action adventure video game Grand Theft Auto: Vice City Stories on the in-game radio station Emotion 98.3.

== Track listing ==
All tracks written by the Passions.

7" single (POSP 222)

1. "I'm in Love with a German Film Star"
2. "(Don't Talk to Me) I'm Shy"

== Sam Taylor-Wood version ==
British artist and filmmaker Sam Taylor-Wood covered "I'm in Love with a German Film Star" and released it as a single on 20 October 2008 on the German Kompakt label. It was produced by Pet Shop Boys, who also contributed a full length "Symphonic Mix". Other remixes were provided by Gui Boratto, Mark Reeder and Jürgen Paape. The single reached No. 1 on the UK Dance Singles Chart in November 2008.

=== Track listing ===
7" single (KOMPAKT POP 13/7)

1. "I'm in Love with a German Film Star" (original radio edit)
2. "I'm in Love with a German Film Star" (Mark Reeder's Rundfunk mix)

12" single (KOMPAKT POP 13) and download

1. "I'm in Love with a German Film Star" (Gui Boratto mix)
2. "I'm in Love with a German Film Star" (PSB symphonic mix)
3. "I'm in Love with a German Film Star" (Mark Reeder's Stuck in the 80's mix)
4. "I'm in Love with a German Film Star" (Jürgen Paape mix)

CD single (KOMPAKT POP MAXI CD 3)

1. "I'm in Love with a German Film Star" (original radio edit)
2. "I'm in Love with a German Film Star" (PSB symphonic mix)
3. "I'm in Love with a German Film Star" (PSB symphonic instrumental mix)
4. "I'm in Love with a German Film Star" (Mark Reeder's Stuck in the 80's mix)
5. "I'm in Love with a German Film Star" (Gui Boratto mix)

== Other versions ==
- Linoleum covered the song on their second album and also released it as a single in 2000 on the Fierce Panda label
- American rock band Foo Fighters covered "I'm in Love with a German Film Star" as the B-side to their 2005 single "Best of You"
- British electronic duo Kish Mauve recorded a version for the B-side of their 2006 single "Modern Love".
- A version was recorded by American singer-songwriter Chris Whitley for his 2006 album, Reiter In
- On 12 April 2010, the band Dubstar released a cover version of the song for an Amnesty International charity project
- British group, Sunscreem covered the song on their 2018 album, Out of the Woods
- Belgian tribute band Echo City Waves released a cover of the song in 2021
- In 2025, British singer/songwriter Andy Bell released a cover of the song on his third solo album Pinball Wanderer
