= The Passions (British band) =

British-Irish post-punk/new wave band

- Also known as: The Youngsters; The Rivers of Passion Barbara Gogan and The Passions
- Origin: Shepherd's Bush, London, England
- Genres: Post-punk, new wave
- Years active: 1978–1983
- Labels: Soho, Fiction, Polydor
- Past members: Barbara Gogan; Claire Bidwell; Richard Williams; Dack Dyde; Mitch Barker; Clive Timperley; David Agar; Kevin Armstrong; Jeff Smith; Penny Tobin (keyboards); Stephen Wright (guitar)
- Website: thepassions.co.uk (archived)

The Passions were a British-Irish post-punk/new wave band which formed in 1978 and disbanded in 1983. The Passions' music was grounded mainly in Barbara Gogan's voice and Clive Timperley's delicate Echoplex guitar work. They were considered a one-hit wonder due to their early 1981 single "I'm in Love with a German Film Star".

== History ==
=== Formation ===
Based in Shepherd's Bush in west London, The Passions formed in early 1978 as the Youngsters with a line-up of Gogan (guitar, vocals), Claire Bidwell (bass guitar), Richard Williams (drums), Dack Dyde (guitar) and Mitch Barker (vocals). Williams and Gogan were previously in the punk rock outfit the Derelicts. After a name change to Rivers of Passion, soon shortened to The Passions, Dyde was replaced by Timperley (formerly of The 101ers).

The Passions' first single, issued in March 1979 on the Soho label, was the double A-side "Needles and Pills" (written by Dyde) and "Body and Soul", which assisted in gaining the band a recording contract with Fiction Records. By the time the band recorded the first of their three Peel sessions in November 1979, Barker had departed and Gogan took over as lead vocalist.

=== Debut album ===
Michael & Miranda, the band's debut album, was released on 18 April 1980, preceded by their second single, "Hunted". The album was produced by Fiction head Chris Parry and engineered by Mike Hedges. In May 1980, The Passions embarked on a UK and European tour supporting labelmates The Cure. Bidwell left after the tour (joining The Wall) and was replaced in July 1980 by David Agar, and the band were dropped by Fiction.

A meeting with Peter Wilson, the in-house producer for Polydor Records, led to the band signing to that label, which released their third single, "The Swimmer", on 1 October 1980.

Their major chart hit, "I'm in Love with a German Film Star", was released as the band's fourth single on 23 January 1981. The lyrics were written by Gogan about Steve Connelly, a one-time roadie for The Clash and Sex Pistols who had minor roles in several German films. It was produced by Peter Wilson. According to Wilson, "It was a song that almost seemed to write itself". The music weeklies declared the song "Single of the Week", and it was named "Peoples Choice" on Capital Radio. This led to a Top of the Pops appearance on 5 February 1981, which was repeated on 26 February 1981.

=== Second album ===
The next single, "Skin Deep", produced by Nigel Gray, was issued on 2 July 1981. "Skin Deep" and the previous two A-sides ("The Swimmer" and "I'm in Love with a German Film Star") were included, along with several brand new recordings, on the band's second album, Thirty Thousand Feet Over China, released on 18 September 1981.

Timperley left the band in Verona, Italy, in December 1981, during the Italian leg of their prophetically named "Tour Till We Crack" tour, as a result of "serious political differences".

The next single, "Africa Mine", released on 8 January 1982, was recorded by the remaining members prior to a line-up change. The guitar part was played by their producer, Peter Wilson. Gogan explained the situation: "It's the same old story. Some bands play together for 10 years and it's all very wonderful and imaginative. More often, though, you reach a point where you've done all you can do and you want to change. Whenever we've reached that point someone has always left and brought us a step further on. Any band playing their own songs to the public has a duty to change and keep being imaginative all the time". The Canadian band Go Four 3 released a cover of the song on their 1987 album, Six Friends.

=== Third album ===
Kevin Armstrong, previously with Local Heroes SW9 and a contributor to Thomas Dolby's debut album, joined The Passions in 1982. The group also added a keyboard player, Jeff Smith, best known for his past work with Lene Lovich. Armstrong and Smith took part in the recording of the band's third album, Sanctuary, produced by Mick Glossop. The first single from that album was "Jump for Joy", which was released on 5 May 1982, followed by the album and the "Sanctuary" single on 18 September 1982.

Stephen Wright, previously in the band Bim, then replaced Armstrong. The band toured Europe and the US, and appeared on The Old Grey Whistle Test on BBC 2 and on Whatever You Want on Channel 4, from which two live songs can be seen on YouTube.

=== Dissolution and reissues ===
The Passions dissolved for good in the middle of 1983, after playing their last show at London's Marquee Club that August.

A compilation album, Passion Plays, was issued by Polydor on vinyl in 1985 and CD in 1995. "I'm in Love with a German Film Star" was re-released as a download in December 2006, and Thirty Thousand Feet Over China was reissued on CD with five bonus tracks on Cherry Red Records on 21 July 2008.

Michael & Miranda was reissued on CD with three bonus tracks on Cherry Red Records in November 2015.

Sanctuary was reissued on CD with nine bonus tracks on Rubellan Remasters in November 2019.

== Later projects ==
Gogan resurfaced in 1997, when she issued Made on Earth, an album she recorded with the French experimentalist Hector Zazou.

Armstrong served as a guitarist and songwriter for numerous artists including David Bowie, Iggy Pop, Morrissey, Steve Nieve and Sinéad O'Connor, and was a member of Tin Machine.

== Band members ==
- Barbara Gogan — guitar, vocals (1978–1983)
- Claire Bidwell — bass guitar (1978–1980)
- Richard Williams — drums (1978–1983)
- Dack Dyde — guitar (1978)
- Mitch Barker — vocals (1978–1979)
- Clive Timperley — guitar (1978–1981)
- David Agar — bass guitar (1980–1983)
- Kevin Armstrong — guitar (1982)
- Jeff Smith — keyboards (1982–1983)
- Stephen Wright — guitar (1982–1983)

== Discography ==
=== Studio albums ===
- 1980: Michael & Miranda (Fiction)
- 1981: Thirty Thousand Feet Over China (Polydor) — No. 92 (UK Albums Chart)
- 1982: Sanctuary (Polydor)

=== Compilation albums ===
- 1985: Passion Plays (Polydor)
- 2004: The Passions Singles (Lulumusic)

=== Singles ===
Year	Single	Chart Positions	
Year	Single	UK	IRE
1979	"Needles and Pills" / "Body and Soul"	-	-
1979	"Hunted"	-	-
1980	"The Swimmer"	-	-
1981	"I'm in Love with a German Film Star"	25	30
1981	"Skin Deep" / "I Radiate"	-	-
1981	"The Swimmer" (reissue)	-	-
1982	"Africa Mine"	-	-
1982	"Jump for Joy"	-	-
1982	"Sanctuary"	-	-
1982	"Love is Essential" (French promo only)	-	-
2006	"I'm in Love with a German Film Star" (download only)	-	-

== See also ==
- List of post-punk bands
- List of performers on Top of the Pops
- List of Peel sessions
