= List of Wild at Heart episodes =

This is an episode list of the ITV television drama series Wild At Heart. It stars Stephen Tompkinson, Amanda Holden, Lucy-Jo Hudson, Deon Stewardson, Hayley Mills, Dawn Steele, Luke Ward-Wilkinson, Rafaella Hutchinson, Olivia Scott-Taylor, Mary-Ann Barlow, Robert Bathurst, and Jill Halfpenny.

== Series overview ==
Series	Episodes	Originally released		Average viewers (in millions)
Series	Episodes	First released	Last released	Average viewers (in millions)
1	6	29 January 2006	5 March 2006	9.67
2	10	14 January 2007	18 March 2007	7.94
3	8	20 January 2008	9 March 2008	8.17
4	10	11 January 2009	15 March 2009	8.03
5	10	10 January 2010	14 March 2010	7.71
6	10	9 January 2011	13 March 2011	7.61
7	11	8 January 2012	30 December 2012	7.23

== Episodes ==
=== Series 1 (2006) ===
No. overall	No. in series	Title	Directed by	Written by	Original release date	UK viewers (millions)
1	1	"Episode One"	David Evans	Ashley Pharoah	29 January 2006	10.83
Veterinarian Danny Trevanion, his wife Sarah, and their children: Rosie, Evan and Olivia, set out from Bristol, England for a holiday in Africa to rehabilitate a vervet monkey. Evan hasn't adjusted well to Sarah's divorce and is a victim of school bullying. Their short holiday looks like it could turn out quite differently when they arrive at Leopards Den and meet Anders Du Plessis and his housekeeper Nomsa. First appearance of Danny Trevanion, Sarah Trevanion, Rosie Trevanion, Anders Du Plessis, Evan Adams, Olivia Adams and Nomsa Xaba.
2	2	"Episode Two"	David Evans	Ashley Pharoah	5 February 2006	10.29
Danny considers investing all their money by signing a binding business contract with Anders Du Plessis, whose family has owned Leopards Den for more than 100 years. Competition from Mara, a nearby luxury lodge and much larger reserve, could threaten their hoped-for livelihood. Evan and Du Plessis accidentally injure a cheetah, but all attention turns to Olivia when she is bitten by a deadly cobra. First appearance of Alex Tate.
3	3	"Episode Three"	David Evans	Ashley Pharoah	12 February 2006	9.42
Sarah is furious when her ex-husband Simon arrives unexpectedly with his girlfriend Ruby and threatens legal action if Sarah won't allow him to take Evan and Olivia back to England. On Rosie's first night working at a local bar, a drunken brawl breaks out but Alex Tate, owner of Mara Lodge, is watching out for her. First appearance of Themba Khumalo and Simon Adams.
4	4	"Episode Four"	Cilla Ware	Ashley Pharoah	19 February 2006	9.01
A row between Danny and Evan results in a dangerously half-sedated lioness being on the loose. Evan runs off in anger, luring Olivia away with him. Not knowing that Danny and Du Plessis have had a vehicle accident, Sarah asks Tate to help her search for the children. Evan learns a hard lesson when the lioness ultimately dies because of his irresponsible behaviour.
5	5	"Episode Five"	Cilla Ware	Ashley Pharoah	26 February 2006	9.05
Sarah is forced to ask Tate for help when the first paying guests arrive early at a chaotic Leopards Den. Meanwhile, a string of misunderstandings convinces Rosie that Sarah and Tate are having an affair, and she attempts to broach the subject to Danny. Amidst the family's emotional upheaval, rampaging rogue male elephants are damaging the reserve.
6	6	"Episode Six"	Cilla Ware	Ashley Pharoah	5 March 2006	9.44
Danny is furious when a zebra is killed (possibly by poachers), and he and Du Plessis decide to stake out the grazing area. When one of the poachers dies after eating meat from the dead animal, a test reveals anthrax and Danny is forced to quarantine Leopards Den. Danny is terrified when Sarah falls ill — is it anthrax or only an allergy to the vaccine? Meanwhile, Rosie's friend Izzy is visiting from England, and Rosie realizes how much she has grown to love her new life in Africa. Last appearance of Themba Khumalo.

=== Series 2 (2007) ===
No. overall	No. in series	Title	Directed by	Written by	Original release date	UK viewers (millions)
7	1	"Episode One"	Nick Laughland	Ashley Pharoah	14 January 2007	9.00
Sarah's attempts to host a wedding reception at Leopards Den to aid the family's desperate finances are thwarted at every turn. Alex Tate is attacked by a rhinoceros whilst hunting illegally, and Danny holds his rival's life in his hands. Nomsa's daughter Thandi returns from university.
8	2	"Episode Two"	Nick Laughland	Ashley Pharoah	21 January 2007	9.00
Mara Lodge is reopening under new management, and members of a British wildlife charity arrive to release a vulture into the wild. Danny's infatuation with the charity's beautiful spokesperson leads him to make an imprudent decision, but the family's kindness toward a wealthy visitor brings its own reward.
9	3	"Episode Three"	Richard Spence	Stuart Hepburn	28 January 2007	7.25
Evan and Du Plessis ('Dup') keep avoiding the routine work at Leopard's Den to look after Togo, an orphaned elephant. While leading a game drive, Rosie finds a young man lying dehydrated in the bush. He carries a photo and a shocking letter for Dup. Sarah receives news about her father who is in hospital in England.
10	4	"Episode Four"	Richard Spence	Michael Chaplin	4 February 2007	7.48
With Sarah away at her father's funeral, a bitter inspector arrives to conduct an annual review at Leopards Den. Danny feels the pressure of Sarah's absence, and it reaches a boiling point when the inspector threatens not to renew their permit because of his past conflicts with Dup.
11	5	"Episode Five"	Nick Laughland	Lucy Gannon	11 February 2007	7.47
Everyone's excited about the arrival of Danny's former tutor and Rosie's godfather, Bash. Danny has invited him to Leopards Den to work alongside him in the surgery, but it quickly becomes apparent that Bash may not be up to the tasks required. Concurrently, Danny must make a difficult decision about an old, ailing cheetah.
12	6	"Episode Six"	David Caffrey	Niall Leonard	18 February 2007	7.67
The family is less than prepared when Sarah's rather difficult and interfering mother Caroline arrives. Dup, however, sees her in an entirely different light. Sarah learns a painful truth, and Danny (for whom family is supremely important) reassures her that he'll support whatever decision she makes.
13	7	"Episode Seven"	David Caffrey	Jack Williams	25 February 2007	7.94
Sarah's ex-husband Simon and his new fiancée arrive at Leopard's Den for their planned wedding ceremony. Danny's happy expectation for growing their family is dashed when Sarah reveals her real goals, and Caroline interferes at every turn. When Danny has an accident out in the bush, Sarah is jolted into reconsidering her position.
14	8	"Episode Eight"	Jim O'Hanlon	Michael Chaplin	4 March 2007	7.95
A small plane crash at Leopards Den brings an unwanted visitor with questionable motives. His secret cargo introduces the possibility of exposure to a deadly virus.
15	9	"Episode Nine"	Jim O'Hanlon	Ashley Pharoah	11 March 2007	7.79
Dup's birthday celebration doesn't go according to plan. He's facing a health scare (which he has kept secret) and he doesn't feel like celebrating. Danny tries to coax Dup back out into the bush doing what he loves, but things take a deadly turn when Hobie the lion turns against them.
16	10	"Episode Ten"	Jim O'Hanlon	Ashley Pharoah	18 March 2007	7.89
The residents at Leopards Den are reeling from the lion attack. Danny has returned home from hospital, but Dup is still unconscious. Will he pull through? Meanwhile, Danny is suffering from post-traumatic stress, and Cedric Fatani (Mara's new manager) takes advantage of the situation.

=== Series 3 (2008) ===
No. overall	No. in series	Title	Directed by	Written by	Original release date	UK viewers (millions)
17	1	"Episode One"	Nigel Douglas	Ashley Pharoah	20 January 2008	8.55
Sarah and Caroline decide to build and furnish some luxury accommodations to attract wealthy guests in an attempt to sort out the family's financial problems. Danny is focused on more practical concerns and doesn't understand why his checks to pay the bills keep bouncing. When two endangered tiger cubs go missing from Mara, blame is automatically cast on the Trevanions.
18	2	"Episode Two"	Nigel Douglas	Jack Williams	27 January 2008	7.95
Danny brings in two veterinary students in an attempt to choose an assistant, but he fails to see that his own daughter Rosie has the practical experience he's really looking for. Sarah realizes she needs her Mum after firing her and discovering she's taken a job as Deputy Manager at Mara.
19	3	"Episode Three"	Nigel Douglas	Michael Chaplin	3 February 2008	8.14
Du Plessis is over the moon when Kirk reveals his fiancée is pregnant. However, Kirk drops a bombshell about their plans for their future. Mara's new American owner, Elliot Kriel wants to pull down the fences between the two reserves and forge a cooperative (rather than competitive) relationship with the Trevanions.
20	4	"Episode Four"	Juliet May	Michael Chaplin	10 February 2008	7.70
An old friend of Danny's from veterinary college turns up with a lioness she's stolen from a distant reserve involved in dodgy hunting practices. She implicates Danny because she knows he won't allow the owners to take the animal back.
21	5	"Episode Five"	Juliet May	Andy Watts	17 February 2008	7.93
Dup discovers a rare, highly prized white lion at Mara, and the family decides to keep it a secret to prevent it being poached. Caroline reveals the lion's presence to a visiting journalist and is blamed when the lion is snared. Danny is determined to discover the truth, which leads to an angry confrontation.
22	6	"Episode Six"	Nick Laughland	Nick Laughland	24 February 2008	7.91
A severe drought forces Danny to sell some of his favourite wild animals and use the money for a desperately needed well in the township. Rosie and Max reveal their engagement. Grateful locals respond by helping to build the Leopards Den animal hospital. Finally, it looks like the tide is turning in a positive direction for the Trevanion family.
23	7	"Episode Seven"	Nick Laughland	Ashley Pharoah	2 March 2008	8.59
The continuing drought has created a tense atmosphere, which worsens when Max's parents and brother arrive for the big wedding day. Everything is brought to a terrifying halt when a bush fire rages across the property and threatens to destroy everything the family has worked so hard to achieve.
24	8	"Episode Eight"	Nick Laughland	Ashley Pharoah	9 March 2008	8.56
In the shocking series finale, amidst a raging wildfire, Sarah dies attempting to save the life of their pet cheetah Jana. The family is plunged into grief and mourning, and it's unclear what the future holds for them. As reconstruction on the animal hospital begins, they try to come to terms with their tragic loss. Last appearance of Sarah Trevanion & Rafaella Hutchinson as Olivia Adams.

=== Series 4 (2009) ===
No. overall	No. in series	Title	Directed by	Written by	Original release date	UK viewers (millions)
25	1	"Episode One"	Nigel Douglas	Ashley Pharoah	11 January 2009	7.71
Twelve months have passed since the bush fire that destroyed the animal hospital and made Danny a widower. Now he must face the court's decision regarding custody of Evan. Meanwhile, Rosie is interviewed for vet school and Dup takes matters into his own hands to save a baby elephant who is a victim of the asset strippers shutting down Mara.
26	2	"Episode Two"	Nigel Douglas	Andy Watts	18 January 2009	7.73
At Dup's suggestion, Danny makes an uncharacteristic decision to spirit Evan away to an old army fort, rather than sending him back to his father in England. They encounter a sick hippo and discover the cause. Rosie meets Mara's new owner, Vanessa, and tries to treat an injured lioness, putting her future career as a vet at risk.
27	3	"Episode Three"	Nigel Douglas	Niall Leonard	25 January 2009	7.48
Danny is put in charge of culling a large number of animals to bring an outbreak of rabies under control. A new vet, Alice Collins arrives from the city to help. When her young daughter Charlotte wanders off into the bush, a tragedy is narrowly averted. Meanwhile Evan returns to Africa after spending time at home in England with his father. First appearance of Alice Collins & Megan Martell as Charlotte Collins
28	4	"Episode Four"	Beryl Richards	Jack Williams	1 February 2009	8.20
Rosie gets injured by an elephant. She and Max finally marry, but the injury leads to sad news for the family. Everyone despises Caroline's sister Georgina, who has come to keep Dup in line while Caroline is in England. Dup is devastated when Georgina reveals that she persuaded Caroline not to return.
29	5	"Episode Five"	Beryl Richards	John Moloney	8 February 2009	7.69
Rosie and Max's honeymoon didn't turn out as they expected, and Dup decides to help settle their differences. Danny and Alice are called to attend to a vicious wild dog that's been captured by a local farmer. Danny calls in an expert to help find the dog's pack, and Alice is challenged to make an important decision when the visitor turns out to be someone she knows.
30	6	"Episode Six"	Paul Harrison	Matt Evans	15 February 2009	8.11
Everyone is devastated when Dup announces he's leaving immediately to join Caroline in England. Alice's feelings for Danny are becoming more apparent, but Vanessa also seeks his attention. Rosie and Fatani investigate the questionable source of a lion purchase, which leads them into danger. Rosie and Max leave for Cape Town so Rosie can attend vet school.
31	7	"Episode Seven"	Paul Harrison	Jack Williams	22 February 2009	8.21
Guests are attracted to Leopards Den to see Du Plessis in action as Georgina tries to pass him off as South Africa's answer to Crocodile Dundee. Meanwhile, Alice wants to gain recognition for Leopards Den as a serious conservation facility.
32	8	"Episode Eight"	Nick Laughland	Ashley Pharoah	1 March 2009	8.30
Alice's brother Rowan arrives from Scotland to say that their father has died. Without Danny's agreement, Alice purchases an aged giraffe at an auction. As a great storm is brewing, Vanessa tries to entice Danny with an unwanted kiss. The storm hits with dire consequences
33	9	"Episode Nine"	Nick Laughland	Ashley Pharoah	8 March 2009	8.52
In the storm's aftermath, Rowan helps to search for Charlotte amidst the rubble and there is a frantic search to rescue Danny who's injured out in the bush. Convinced that Danny is falling for Vanessa, Alice makes a painful decision. With his friend's happiness hanging in the balance, Dup opens Danny's eyes to the truth.
34	10	"Episode Ten"	Nick Laughland	Andy Watts	15 March 2009	8.31
Danny and Alice try to keep their new romance a secret, but more pressing concerns take hold when a lioness threatens the township. Relations between Leopards Den and Mara – and between Alice and Rowan – are shattered when Vanessa refuses to help their dying elephant calf Tula. Final appearance of Luke Ward-Wilkinson as Evan Adams

=== Series 5 (2010) ===
No. overall	No. in series	Title	Directed by	Written by	Original release date	UK viewers (millions)
35	1	"Episode One"	Nick Laughland	Jack Williams	10 January 2010	8.55
Danny and Alice have been rehabilitating a group of circus elephants. Rowan is surprisingly cooperative, until he reveals an ulterior motive. After a turbulent courtship, Dup is set to marry his beloved Caroline. As the wedding plans are finalised, their happy day is threatened by someone from Caroline's past.
36	2	"Episode Two"	Nick Laughland	Ashley Pharoah	17 January 2010	7.81
Danny has a crisis of confidence when he hurts his back helping to build a new school in the township. A hotshot young vet at Mara makes a play for Alice, but his modern ideas are put to the test. Meanwhile, Caroline asks Dup to organise their honeymoon, and all that glitters turns out not to be golden.
37	3	"Episode Three"	David Richards	John Moloney	24 January 2010	7.22
Against the backdrop of a beauty pageant at Mara, Alice is torn between helping Rowan rehabilitate a tiger and her own seemingly more mundane responsibilities at Leopards Den. Danny's altruistic project to help the township's animals takes an unfortunate turn when a neighbour's pregnant cow develops complications.
38	4	"Episode Four"	David Richards	Matt Evans	31 January 2010	7.54
Danny confides in Dup about his intention to ask for Alice's hand in marriage, but the unexpected and turbulent arrival of his deeply troubled teenage stepdaughter Olivia threatens to derail his plans. First appearance of Olivia Scott-Taylor as Olivia Adams
39	5	"Episode Five"	David Richards	Ben Edwards & Rachael New	7 February 2010	8.09
Danny and Alice's plans for a romantic weekend away are ruined when they come across a crash out in the bush. With a seriously injured tourist on their hands and a lion on the loose, they are faced with a long, dark night in the bush. Meanwhile, Dup decides it's time Olivia learned some manners.
40	6	"Episode Six"	Roger Gartland	Jack Lothian	14 February 2010	7.97
Danny's attempts to help Alice settle into her new job at Mara backfire when a hyena goes on the rampage. With an injured guest threatening a lawsuit and the life of an animal in the balance, he realises he must pull out all the stops if he is to salvage his relationship with Alice
41	7	"Episode Seven"	Roger Gartland	Chris Murray	21 February 2010	7.21
With matters between Danny and Alice still tense, a distracted Danny appears to make a fatal mistake while treating a rare black leopard. When the big cat dies, its arrogant owner demands that Danny be investigated for malpractice. Danny follows his instincts and goes against his suspension to treat Jana who is suffering from renal failure.
42	8	"Episode Eight"	Roger Gartland	Chris Murray	28 February 2010	7.69
After being struck off, Danny's career is in tatters and he's struggling to cope. The family's plan to keep him busy with a group of young offenders backfires when one of the young men (Thabo) takes a shine to Olivia. A shock wave hits the family as Rowan reveals an explosive secret.
43	9	"Episode Nine"	Paul Harrison	Charlie Martin	7 March 2010	7.72
There are dangerous consequences when Dup ignores his heart condition and collapses while alone in the bush. Danny and Alice get more than they bargained for when they try to deal with two rogue lions that have been attacking local cattle. Olivia and Caroline struggle with their emotions as the anniversary of Sarah's death draws near.
44	10	"Episode Ten"	Paul Harrison	Jack Williams	14 March 2010	7.32
When Dup learns of Caroline's intention to buy them a retirement home he confesses to Olivia that he's given their savings away to help his son. Danny and Alice try to find a home for a rare aardwolf, but Vanessa's father, who has arrived to help save Mara from financial ruin, refuses to cooperate. Final appearance of Megan Martell as Charlotte Collins

=== Series 6 (2011) ===
No. overall	No. in series	Title	Directed by	Written by	Original release date	UK viewers (millions)
45	1	"Episode One"	Paul Harrison	Ashley Pharoah	9 January 2011	8.19
While on honeymoon in London Danny and Alice meet Danny's estranged father Robert, who returns with them to Leopards Den to help save the pride of lions from a deadly outbreak of canine distemper. Robert reveals he has brain cancer. How will Danny cope with the loss of both his father and his beloved pride of lions? First appearance of Tarryn Faye Brummage as Charlotte Collins
46	2	"Episode Two"	Paul Harrison	Chris Murray	16 January 2011	8.58
Grieving Danny throws himself into his work and applies for the prestigious role of State Vet. His attempts to involve Thabo in the lion-breeding project leave Dup feeling like an outsider. Meanwhile, a geologist arrives to survey the area, and a rogue baboon causes havoc.
47	3	"Episode Three"	Paul Harrison	Jack Williams	23 January 2011	7.17
On his first day as State Vet Danny faces a tough decision when his investigation into an animal-smuggling ring takes him surprisingly close to home. Meanwhile, Thabo is settling in, but the arrival of his delinquent older brother brings trouble and casts doubt on Thabo's sincerity.
48	4	"Episode Four"	Ian Barnes	Niall Leonard	30 January 2011	7.38
Danny oversees an animal translocation for his first big project as State Vet. Alice is confident she can run the surgery in his absence – until she has a close encounter with lions.
49	5	"Episode Five"	Ian Barnes	Chris Murray	6 February 2011	8.01
Strange events are occurring at Leopards Den, and Danny must work fast to solve the mystery before more animals die. His investigation reveals a looming threat to Leopards Den. Dup jumps to the wrong conclusion when he discovers a positive pregnancy test in the trash.
50	6	"Episode Six"	Barry Berk	Chris Murray	13 February 2011	7.46
Danny is called in to investigate when the routine transportation of a valuable tiger goes wrong, and he discovers that Alice could be to blame for the animal's death. Meanwhile, Dup resorts to desperate measures to save his home and land when Christian Peeters, manager of the mining company AfriSpec, reveals the company's real intentions.
51	7	"Episode Seven"	Barry Berk	Jack Williams	20 February 2011	6.99
Danny and Alice are divided when Peeters wants their help relocating a pack of rogue hyenas. Meanwhile, Dup launches a one-man campaign of vandalism against Peeters and the mining company. A restraining order and a fine are not the only consequences of his actions.
52	8	"Episode Eight"	Maurice Phillips	Niall Leonard	27 February 2011	6.98
As the High Court case looms, pitting AfriSpec against the Trevanion Family, Danny realises he may have to sacrifice his principles to save Leopards Den. Caroline decides to take matters into her own hands by going undercover at the mining company.
53	9	"Episode Nine"	Maurice Phillips	Tom Grieves	6 March 2011	7.91
When AfriSpec takes over Leopards Den, Danny reaches an agreement with Peeters to set up a field hospital in the bush until all the animals have been rehomed. Dup tries to claim squatters' rights, but when the electrical generator fails, their protest takes a catastrophic turn.
54	10	"Episode Ten"	Maurice Phillips	Chris Murray	13 March 2011	7.43
The family's last stand to stop the mining company from destroying Leopards Den ends in tragedy. Now essentially homeless, Danny decides it would be best for everyone to return temporarily to the UK to live with Georgina until he can find a new home for them. Du Plessis learns that rhino poachers are working in the area, and he sees a way to persuade Danny to stay in Africa whilst the rest of the family depart for England.

=== Series 7 (2012) ===
No. overall	No. in series	Title	Directed by	Written by	Original release date	UK viewers (millions)
55	1	"Episode One"	Maurice Phillips	Chris Murray	8 January 2012	8.35
Some time has passed. While the rest of the family has been in England, Danny and Dup have been working at 'Big Five' wild animal park, trying to raise money to purchase a new property after losing Leopards Den. Pregnant Alice arrives unannounced and discovers they have been lying about their situation. Christian Peeters' determination to resume demolition of Leopards Den pushes Danny to an angry confrontation.
56	2	"Episode Two"	Maurice Phillips	Chris Murray	15 January 2012	7.62
Caroline, Liv and Charlotte are excited to be back and are keen to see their new home, Clearwater Farm. Their excitement turns to dismay when they discover the place is a ruin. Dup confronts Danny about the suspicious death of Christian Peeters, and they agree to keep quiet about the dead body found in the Leopards Den swimming pool.
57	3	"Episode Three"	Maurice Phillips	Jack Williams	22 January 2012	7.58
Danny has found a potential financial lifeline in a pharmaceutical company looking to fund an environmental project. He pitches his business plan, but the day lurches from disaster to disaster. It soon becomes apparent that Ed Lynch, veterinarian at Big Five, is competing for the same grant. Dup is determined to prevent the sale of Leopards Den to Lynch.
58	4	"Episode Four"	Darrell Roodt	Liz Lake	29 January 2012	7.07
Caroline is furious that Danny appears to be betraying Dup by agreeing to work with Ed Lynch. When a controlled brush fire spirals out of control and a cheetah is injured, Caroline helps Lynch operate on the animal and she sees a more sympathetic side to him. Meanwhile, Rosie returns at Caroline's suggestion to try to help solve the family's problems. But where is Max?
59	5	"Episode Five"	Andrew Gunn	Ashley Pharoah & Niall Leonard	5 February 2012	7.19
Caroline's angry loyalty to Dup estranges the pair from the rest of the family. It appears Dup is coming unhinged by his belief that he's seen Christian Peeters' ghost in the township. Meanwhile, Ed and Danny try to rescue some animals from a zoo that's closing. Caroline confronts Dup, who reveals the truth about the circumstances of Peeters' death.
60	6	"Episode Six"	Darrell Roodt	Jeff Povey	12 February 2012	7.65
Danny is in prison, accused of murdering Peeters, but Dup sets out to prove his innocence. Meanwhile, Ed's increasingly suspicious behaviour makes Dup think he's harbouring a dark secret. With nobody around to help, Rosie goes on a lone search for a wild cheetah, leading her into danger.
61	7	"Episode Seven"	Andrew Gunn	Chris Murray	19 February 2012	6.58
Ed is left in charge of the endangered species project while Danny is away and Dup is doing community service. A beautiful new female vet turns up at the clinic, claiming to have a lion that carries the rare Barbary gene. Dup suspects the newcomer has an ulterior motive. Meanwhile, Fatani, Liv and Thabo are carrying out an animal census
62	8	"Episode Eight"	Andrew Gunn	Jack Williams	26 February 2012	6.92
Everyone is surprised when Fiona arrives, claiming to be Ed's wife and seeking to reconcile the differences that led to their earlier separation. However, a misunderstanding leaves her thinking that Rosie is Ed's new love interest until Rosie announces that her and Max are getting divorced. Meanwhile, a disturbing link is revealed between some seemingly unrelated animal deaths.
63	9	"Episode Nine"	Andrew Gunn	Jeff Povey	4 March 2012	6.88
The Trevanion family's financial woes continue, as Danny and Ed are refused an extension on their mortgage. Desperate to restore his relationship with Alice and be by her side when the baby is born, Danny makes an anguished decision about his future that leaves Dup stunned.
64	10	"Episode Ten"	Maurice Phillips	Chris Murray	11 March 2012	6.98
Strange things are happening at Leopards Den as Danny prepares to leave for the UK. There's an invasion of frogs, an elephant has wandered into the kitchen, and the cheetah is off his food. Danny relishes one last adventure before his departure, but there's danger in it. Meanwhile, Dup makes an alarming discovery about Ed and Fiona. As Danny tries to leave Leopards Den the elephants block his path. Will he stay, or will he go?
65	11	"Episode Eleven"	Nick Laughland	Chris Murray & Ashley Pharoah	30 December 2012	6.71
Dup learns he has a life-threatening heart condition. With relationship issues causing tension in the family and Danny unhappy about the forthcoming marriage of Rosie and her fiancé Dylan, Dup grasps at the opportunity for one last adventure to heal the rifts. Against the backdrop of the wedding celebration, Danny pays tribute to Dup and to Leopards Den. Dup slips quietly away to the rocky outcrop where years earlier he made the decision to invite the Trevanions to live at Leopards Den. With tears of love Caroline explains, "He'll always be here." Framed by the setting sun, Dup removes his hat and closes his eyes. Final appearance of Danny Trevanion, Alice Trevanion, Rosie Trevanion, Charlotte Collins, Anders Du Plessis, Olivia Adams and Nomsa Xaba.
