= Wild at Heart (British TV series) =

- Genre: Family drama
- Created by: Ashley Pharoah
- Starring: Stephen Tompkinson; Dawn Steele; Lucy-Jo Hudson; Amanda Holden; Olivia Scott-Taylor; Deon Stewardson; Hayley Mills; Nomsa Xaba; Thapelo Mokoena; Jessie Wallace
- Country of origin: United Kingdom
- Original language: English
- No. of series: 7 + Finale special
- No. of episodes: 65 (list of episodes)

Production
- Production locations: Glen Afric Country Lodge, Broederstroom, North West Province, 0240, South Africa
- Running time: 43–48 minutes (series, approx.) 120 minutes (finale special, approx.)
- Production companies: Company Pictures; STV Productions

Original release
- Network: ITV
- Release: 29 January 2006 – 30 December 2012

Related
- Life Is Wild

Wild at Heart is a British television drama series created by Ashley Pharoah about a veterinary surgeon and his family, who emigrate from Bristol to South Africa, where they attempt to rehabilitate a game reserve for wild animals and establish a veterinary surgery and animal hospital. The show was broadcast on ITV for seven series beginning on 29 January 2006 and ending on 30 December 2012.

== History ==
Wild at Heart began airing 29 January 2006 on ITV. It ran for seven series, concluding 30 December 2012 with a two-hour finale. It was filmed on location at the Glen Afric Country Lodge, a 1500-acre game reserve and sanctuary that is home to a host of African wildlife, including lions, giraffes, elephants and cheetahs. Glen Afric is located in Broederstroom, North West Province, South Africa. A large set called 'Leopards Den' was built on the property specifically for the production. Producer Ann Harrison-Baxter said: "We literally walked every inch of the reserve to find the best place to build the house, and then it was all created from scratch and aged to look like it had been there for more than a century in just 10 weeks!" Leopards Den was significant as a symbolic character in its own right throughout the show's seven years. It served as the backdrop against which the family struggled to carve out a new life for themselves, and ultimately to survive and remain together.

The primary cast included Stephen Tompkinson as Danny Trevanion; Amanda Holden as Danny's second wife Sarah Trevanion (his first wife, Miranda, is mentioned in the series but died off-screen prior to the start) Lucy-Jo Hudson as Danny's daughter Rosie; Deon Stewardson as the Trevanions' business partner Anders DuPlessis, Hayley Mills as Sarah's mother Caroline; Luke Ward-Wilkinson as Danny's stepson Evan Rafaella Hutchinson as Danny's step-daughter Olivia (series 1-3); Olivia Scott-Taylor as Danny's step-daughter Olivia (series 5-7); Nomsa Xaba as Nomsa, cook and housekeeper at Leopards Den; Thapelo Mokoena as Cedric Fatani, manager at Mara; Martinus Van der Berg as town barman and Rosie's husband, Max; Dawn Steele as Alice Collins (later Trevanion, when she becomes Danny's third wife); Megan Martell as Alice's daughter Charlotte (series 4-5); Tarryn Faye Brummage as Alice's daughter Charlotte (series 6-7), and Atandwa Kani as Thabo.

Wild at Heart was immensely popular in the UK, with ratings peaking at approximately 10 million viewers and never averaging less than 7.5 million over any series (see below). However, the show faced strong competition during Series 7 and speculation appeared in British online newspaper articles in February 2012 that Wild at Heart would be axed after Series 7. In April 2012, similar statements appeared, but ITV did not publish a formal press release confirming that the show was cancelled.

The two-hour finale special was filmed at Leopards Den in September 2012 and aired on 30 December 2012 on ITV. ITV's Head of Drama Series Steve November said: "Wild at Heart will end on a high thanks to the fantastic cast, crew and writing team who produce the drama. We couldn't wish for a better script to celebrate an immensely successful series for ITV." The finale special was followed on 31 December 2012, by a one-hour documentary titled Wild at Heart: Filming With Animals (see below).

In a BBC Radio 2 interview with Simon Mayo on 24 October 2012, Stephen Tompkinson said, "We got back [from South Africa] about three weeks ago [after filming the finale special]. It was very sad to say 'goodbye'...We are ending it in a way that will let you know it's really the end. We're not sort-of loosely hanging on to go try and get a Christmas Special or a Valentine's Day Special out of it. This is it. It ends with a lovely wedding; I'm not going to say who." (Note: BBC Radio 2 makes their interviews available via iPlayer for only a brief period and this interview is no longer available.)

Wild at Heart aired as a simulcast on TV3 Ireland. The pilot episode was remade for an American audience, with a predominantly American cast, different characters and a loosely similar plot line. It succeeded enough for a first full series to be commissioned with the title Life Is Wild. It aired on The CW Television Network in the US, the Hallmark Channel in the United Kingdom, Skai TV in Greece and Warner Channel in South Africa. However, ratings were low and the show was cancelled after Series 1.

The animal action was monitored by the Animal Anti-Cruelty League.

== Cast and characters ==
Character	Series							
Character	1	2	3	4	5	6	7	Finale
Danny Trevanion	Stephen Tompkinson	Stephen Tompkinson	Stephen Tompkinson	Stephen Tompkinson	Stephen Tompkinson	Stephen Tompkinson	Stephen Tompkinson	Stephen Tompkinson
Sarah Trevanion	Amanda Holden	Amanda Holden	Amanda Holden					
Anders Duplesssis	Deon Stewardson	Deon Stewardson	Deon Stewardson	Deon Stewardson	Deon Stewardson	Deon Stewardson	Deon Stewardson	Deon Stewardson
Nomsa Nguni	Nomsa Xaba	Nomsa Xaba	Nomsa Xaba	Nomsa Xaba	Nomsa Xaba	Nomsa Xaba	Nomsa Xaba	Nomsa Xaba
Rosie Trevanion	Lucy-Jo Hudson	Lucy-Jo Hudson	Lucy-Jo Hudson	Lucy-Jo Hudson			Lucy-Jo Hudson	Lucy-Jo Hudson
Evan Adams	Luke Ward-Wilkinson	Luke Ward-Wilkinson	Luke Ward-Wilkinson	Luke Ward-Wilkinson				
Olivia Adams	Rafaella Hutchinson	Rafaella Hutchinson	Rafaella Hutchinson		Olivia Scott-Taylor	Olivia Scott-Taylor	Olivia Scott-Taylor	Olivia Scott-Taylor
Caroline Duplessis		Hayley Mills	Hayley Mills	Hayley Mills	Hayley Mills	Hayley Mills	Hayley Mills	Hayley Mills
Cedric Fatani		Thapelo Mokoena	Thapelo Mokoena	Thapelo Mokoena	Thapelo Mokoena	Thapelo Mokoena	Thapelo Mokoena	Thapelo Mokoena
Max Gifthold		Martinus Van Der Berg	Martinus Van Der Berg	Martinus Van Der Berg				
Amy Kriel			Jessie Wallace					
Alice Collins				Dawn Steele	Dawn Steele	Dawn Steele	Dawn Steele	Dawn Steele
Charlotte Collins				Megan Martell	Megan Martell	Tarryn Faye Brummage	Tarryn Faye Brummage	Tarryn Faye Brummage
Georgina Black				Juliet Mills				
Rowan Collins				Cal MacAnich	Cal MacAnich			
Vanessa				Mary Anne Barlow	Mary Anne Barlow	Mary Anne Barlow		
Thabo					Atandwa Kani	Atandwa Kani	Atandwa Kani	
Christian Peeters (S6-S7) Luke Peeters (S7)						David Butler	David Butler	
Ed Lynch							Robert Bathurst	
Fiona Lynch							Jill Halfpenny	

Actor	Character	Duration	Episodes	Notes
Primary Characters
Stephen Tompkinson	Danny Trevanion	2006–12	1x01-7x11	
Dawn Steele	Alice Trevanion	2009–12	4x03-7x01, 7x11	
Lucy-Jo Hudson	Rosie (Trevanion) Gifthold	2006–09, 2012	1x01-4x06, 7x04-7x11	
Olivia Scott-Taylor	Olivia Adams	2006–2008, 2010–12	1x01-3x08, 5x04-7x11	Rafaella Hutchinson (2006–08)
Tarryn Faye Brummage	Charlotte Collins	2009–12	4x03-7x11	Megan Martell (2009–10)
Deon Stewardson	Anders "Dup" Du Plessis	2006–12	1x01-7x11	Died 2017
Hayley Mills	Caroline Du Plessis	2007–12	2x06-3x08, 4x10-7x11	
Nomsa Xaba	Nomsa Nguni	2006–12	1x01-7x11	
Thapelo Mokoena	Cedric Fatani	2007–12	2x02-7x11	
Bailey the Cheetah	Cassidy	2012		
Past Characters
Robert Bathurst	Ed Lynch	2012	7x01-7x10	
Jill Halfpenny	Fiona Lynch	2012	7x08-7x10	
Atandwa Kani	Thabo	2010–12	5x08, 6x01-7x07	Also in Life is Wild
David Butler	Christian Peeters; Luke Peeters	2011–12	6x05-7x02 7x05	Also in Life is Wild
Niama McLean	Buhle	2010–11	5x03-6x10	Mentioned in series 7
Kagiso Legoadi	Cashile	2010–11	5x03-5x04, 5x10-6x02, 6x07-6x10	
Sithokomele Majola	Junior Fatani	2011		
Bovril	Jana the Cheetah	2006–11		
Mary Anne Barlow	Vanessa	2009–11	4x02-6x06	
Hamley	Hamley the Giraffe	2006–11		
Cal MacAninch	Rowan Collins	2009–10	4x08-5x10	Mentioned in series 7
Fana Mokoena	Mr Ekotto	2007–10		Recurring
Luke Ward-Wilkinson	Evan Adams	2006–09	1x01-4x10	Mentioned in series 5 & 6
Juliet Mills	Georgina Black	2009	4x01-4x04, 4x07-4x10	Mentioned in series 5, 6 & 7
Shana Burton	Grace	2009	4x02-4x10	
Martinus Van Der Berg	Max Gifthold	2007–09	2x01-4x06	Mentioned in series 5 & 7
Wayne Van Rooyen	Kirk Du Plessis	2007–09	2x03, 2x09, 3x03, 4x06	Mentioned in series 5
Kim Cloete	Neema Du Plessis	2008–09	3x03, 4x06	
Unnamed actor	Amber Du Plessis	2008–09	3x03, 4x06	
Jessie Wallace	Amy Kriel	2008	3x05-3x08	
Craig Gardner	Elliot Kriel	2008	3x03-3x08	
Busi Lurayi	Thandi Nguni	2007–08	2x02-2x10	
Mbongeni Nhlapo	Regal	2006–08		
Amanda Holden	Sarah Trevanion	2006–08	1x01-3x08	Mentioned in series 4–7
Gary Lawson	Alex Tate	2006–07	1x02-2x01	
Siyabonga Melongisi Shibe	Themba Khumalo	2006	1x03-1x06	
Guest Characters
Nick Boraine	Dylan	2012	7x11	Finale Special 2012
Colin Moss	Martin Stillman	2012	7x11	Finale Special 2012
Danny Keogh	Piet Stillman	2012	7x11	Finale Special 2012
Dominika Jablonska	Beth	2012		Series 7
Bryan Van Niekerk	Jonas Rittman	2011		
Warren Clarke	Robert Trevanion	2011	6x01	
Camilla Waldman	Hannah	2010		
Nicholas Le Prevost	Gene	2010		
Susie Blake	Judith	2008		
Maggie O'Neill	Elaine	2008		
David Warner	Gerald	2007	2x08	Mentioned in series 3
Samantha Womack	Tessa	2007	2x02	
Geoffrey Hutchings	Bill	2007	2x02	
Edith MacArthur	Dora	2007	2x02	
Vincent Regan	simon adams yerger	2006–07	1x03, 2x07	Mentioned in series 3–5

== Ratings ==
Series	Episodes	Aired	Average Viewers (Millions)
1	6	29 January – 5 March 2006	9.67
2	10	14 January – 25 March 2007	7.94
3	8	13 January – 9 March 2008	8.16
4	10	11 January – 15 March 2009	7.99
5	10	10 January – 14 March 2010	7.71
6	10	9 January – 13 March 2011	8.09
7	10	8 January – 11 March 2012	7.53
Finale Special	1	30 December 2012	6.04

NOTE: All ratings retrieved from https://www.barb.co.uk and include ITV1 HD and ITV1 +1 for series 6 onwards. (BARB website does not allow capture of page URLs for specific rating sets.)

== Series synopsis ==
Series	Summary
Series 1 (2006)	The Trevanion family is introduced at home in Bristol, where an abandoned vervet monkey is brought into Danny's veterinary surgery. His wife Sarah suggests a family holiday to Africa to rehabilitate it. Arriving at Leopards Den, they meet Anders Du Plessis ("Dup") whose family has owned the property for over 100 years. He persuades them to stay and enter into a business partnership to restore the property as a game reserve for wild animals. The Trevanions begin settling into life in the African bush, and Danny grows into his role as a gifted vet treating stray cheetahs, elephants, etc. They face many challenges, including a deadly snakebite, an anthrax outbreak that threatens the reserve's stock; starving lions; runaway children; uninvited guests; and competition from Mara, the larger game park next door whose owner, Alex Tate, doesn't share Danny's values and tries to make a move on Sarah.
Series 2 (2007)	The Trevanions struggle financially and attempt to satisfy their first guests' desire for acceptable accommodations and game drives. Mara's owner is killed while illegally hunting a rhino, and the new manager Cedric Fatani seems even more intent on causing mayhem, as he diverts water from the shared spring, causing the death of many Leopards Den animals. A bitter inspector refuses to renew their permit to house wild animals; Sarah's difficult mother Caroline arrives; and a plane crashes nearby, exposing the family to the threat of deadly disease from a contraband chimpanzee. When Dup is nearly killed and Danny seriously injured in a lion attack, Danny's confidence is shattered, and Fatani takes advantage by trying to buy them out in a moment of weakness.
Series 3 (2008)	The Trevanions attempt to build an animal hospital at Leopards Den – initially a friendly collaboration with Elliot Kriel, the new American owner of Mara. However, his cooperation turns to hostility when he thinks he's been betrayed. Sarah returns briefly to supply teaching at the local school. Tiger cubs go missing, and Rosie Trevanion gets engaged. The series ends with a spectacular drought- and wind-driven wildfire, which ruins Rosie's wedding day, and in the chaos Sarah dies trying to save the family's pet cheetah, Jana. Shocked and wracked with grief, it looks certain Danny will take Sarah's children back to their father in England – until they all agree they want to stay at Leopards Den, and the locals pitch in to help rebuild the fire-ravaged animal hospital.
Series 4 (2009)	About a year after Sarah's tragic death, Danny battles for custody of stepson Evan. The court rules against them and Evan goes briefly back to England, but he convinces his father to let him return. Rosie marries Max and they move to Cape Town so Rosie can attend vet school. A rabies outbreak threatens to decimate the wild animal population, and a new vet, Alice Collins, arrives at Leopards Den. Vanessa, Mara's new owner, creates rivalry by falsely claiming to be in a relationship with Danny. Danny nearly dies due to an accident during a severe storm, and the series ends with Danny and Alice declaring their love for each other.
Series 5 (2010)	The fifth series focuses on family relationships. Du Plessis finally marries Caroline, but extreme tension arises for everyone when Danny's deeply troubled step-daughter Olivia (Liv) turns up unannounced. Struggling to cope, Alice takes a job as vet at Mara and moves there with Charlotte when she and Danny can't resolve their differences. Danny is implicated in the death of a prize black leopard and gets struck off. Things look bleak on all fronts, until a surprise confession turns the tide. Danny and Alice become engaged, and Vanessa finds a way to solve her financial problems at Mara without help from her interfering father.
Series 6 (2011)	On honeymoon in London, Danny and Alice see Danny's estranged father Robert (Warren Clarke). He returns with them to save their pride of lions from a deadly illness. However, Robert soon reveals he has brain cancer. His parting gift is a healthy pair of lions to give Danny a fresh start. Youth offender Thabo is hired for the lion-breeding project. Danny tries "to make a difference" against illegal wild animal trading, but the family faces extreme problems, and mining company AfriSpec managed by Christian Peeters poses the greatest threat yet to their livelihood – just as Alice reveals she's pregnant. Vanessa sells Mara to AfriSpec, and Peeters wins a High Court case to demolish Leopards Den to build a roadway. Caroline suffers a lion attack, and under great duress the family splits up – everyone but Danny and Dup leave for England. In the series cliffhanger Danny and Dup find a way to get AfriSpec to temporarily halt demolition.
Series 7 (2012)	Danny and Dup are working for a new vet, Ed Lynch (Robert Bathurst) at nearby game reserve 'Big Five'. The family returns and tries to make a start at severely derelict Clearwater Farm, but they desperately want Leopards Den back. Alice is called back to the UK. Dup discovers Christian Peeters' dead body in the swimming pool and becomes obsessed with the notion that Danny murdered him in a rage. When AfriSpec withdraws from the mining project, the Trevanions try to buy back Leopards Den but can't afford it. Ed Lynch offers a partnership, and Danny agrees, but complications arise when Ed's estranged wife Fiona arrives unexpectedly. Danny goes briefly to jail but is exonerated. Rosie returns from Cape Town and reveals that she and Max have separated, while Danny makes an agonized decision to go to England to be with Alice when the baby is born. Meanwhile, Ed and Fiona are conniving to use Leopards Den for their own ends. As Danny tries to depart, his beloved elephant family blocks his path and it appears he will once again return to Leopards Den.
Finale Special (2012)	It's one year later at Leopards Den. Ed Lynch and Fiona have since left Leopards Den and Alice is back, but work demands and caring for baby Robert lead to tensions with Danny. Martin, the new neighbor at Mara, has his eye on Alice. Liv and Fatani are struggling; nobody likes Rosie's fiancé Dylan; and Dup receives a frightening medical prognosis. The family's cheetah Cassidy is poached, and tensions are high. Dup decides to use his remaining time to fix his ailing family by proving to Danny that his future son-in-law is worthy. As the wedding approaches, Danny, Dup, Rosie and Dylan set out on one last adventure, but Rosie is forced to fly them away from danger and it appears Dup has hatched his last disastrous plan. The saga of the Trevanion family concludes as Dup slips quietly away during Danny's wedding tribute. He climbs the rocky outcrop overlooking his beloved South African bush, where years earlier he made the decision to invite the Trevanions to live at Leopards Den. With tears of love Caroline explains, "He'll always be here." Framed by the setting sun, Dup removes his hat and closes his eyes, bringing the end to an era.

== Documentary ==
A behind-the-scenes documentary titled Wild at Heart – Filming with Animals aired on ITV on 31 December 2012, the evening following the Finale Special. Narrator Stephen Tompkinson, who played the central character, Danny Trevanion, throughout Wild at Heart, introduces the animals and their handlers and gives an insider's view of how some of the show's biggest animal stunts were achieved. It features previously unseen footage and reveals how real-life emergencies are dealt with in the unpredictable world of filming with animals. The documentary was viewed by 3.19 million viewers. Additional behind-the-scenes clips and special features are available on the DVDs.

== Soundtrack ==
The music for Wild at Heart was composed by Tristin Norwell and Nick Green. The soundtrack is available from iTunes as a download distributed by AWAL. All profits from its sale are donated to Water Aid.

== Offscreen ==
On 9 November 2010, cast and crew returned to the Glen Afric reserve to find that Hamley, a very friendly giraffe that had appeared regularly in the series, had been killed by a lightning strike during a thunderstorm. Stephen Tompkinson said, "There was a giraffe called Hamley. He was an amazing creature. I spent hours with him – usually every morning outside my dressing room. He used to come up and put his head by the first-floor window to have his ears and horns scratched. He was struck by lightning...I’d just introduced him to some friends who had come to visit and two hours later I got a call saying he was dead. It was very shocking. It was like losing a human cast member – he was such a part of the show. It just reminds you when your number's up there's nothing you can do about it, so enjoy it while you can."

When asked how Wild at Heart affected the local area in South Africa where it was filmed, Stephen Tompkinson replied: "A few years ago we opened up a community centre in Brazzaville, which is the local township. We also donated money to sort out the water system there and provide more tanks so people didn't have to walk miles to get water every day. It was lovely to be able to give something back....I’m very, very proud of what we all achieved together on Wild at Heart."

== DVD release ==
DVD	Release date
The Complete First Series (2 discs)	3 April 2006
The Complete Second Series (3 discs)	18 February 2008
The Complete Third Series (3 discs)	2 February 2009
The Complete Fourth Series (3 discs)	1 February 2010
The Complete Fifth Series (3 discs)	7 February 2011
The Complete Sixth Series (3 discs)	6 February 2012
The Complete Seventh Series (3 discs)	20 August 2012
The Finale Special (1 disc)	4 March 2013 (Amazon.co.uk)
Wild at Heart Series 1–8 Complete Boxed Set (21 discs)	8 April 2013 (Amazon.co.uk)

Note: All distributed by Acorn Media UK in Region 2 (PAL) format. Only two series have been released in Region 1 format, both are available from Amazon.com.
