= Nicholas Woodeson =

English actor (born 1949)

- Born: Nicholas Robin Frank Woodeson; 30 November 1949 (age 76)
- Education: Marlborough College
- Alma mater: University of Sussex; Royal Academy of Dramatic Art
- Occupation: Actor
- Years active: 1970–present

Nicholas Robin Frank Woodeson (born 30 November 1949) is an English film, television and theatre actor, and Drama Desk and Olivier Award nominee.

== Early life and education ==
Woodeson was born in Sudan and grew up in Haifa, Israel. He later moved to England, where he started performing at prep school in Sussex, and Marlborough College. He read English at the University of Sussex, and became involved in student drama productions, where he met Michael Attenborough, Jim Carter, and Andy de la Tour. He also participated in the 1970 National Student Drama Festival. Next was a season in rep at the Lyceum Theatre, Crewe, after deciding not to pursue an academic career. He won a scholarship to RADA (1972–1974).

== Career ==
=== Theatre ===
Woodeson's first work after drama school was a season at the Everyman Theatre, Liverpool (1974–75), in a company that included Jonathan Pryce (artistic director), Julie Walters, Pete Postlethwaite and Bill Nighy. He has worked in regional theatre in the UK and US, at the Hampstead Theatre, the Young Vic and Almeida Theatre in London, and at the Manhattan Theatre Club. He joined the Royal Shakespeare Company in 1982 and remained there seven years. On Broadway, his work includes Straker in Man and Superman (1978), Piaf (1981), Inspector Goole in An Inspector Calls (1995), and Burleigh in Mary Stuart (2009). In 2011, he played Mr Prince in the National Theatre revival of Odets' Rocket to the Moon. He appeared in the West End production of Funny Peculiar (1976), in Good (1982), as Bonesy in Jumpers (2003), as Mussabini in Chariots of Fire (2012), and as Harold Wilson in The Audience (2015). He acted in two productions of Pinter's The Birthday Party playing McCann at the National Theatre in 1994, and Goldberg in the Lyric Hammersmith's 50th centenary production in 2008, and two productions of Pinter's The Homecoming, playing Lenny in the 25th Anniversary West End revival in 1991 and Max at the RSC in 2011.

In 2017, following the death of Tim Pigott-Smith, Woodeson took over the role of Willy Loman in the Royal & Derngate tour of Death of a Salesman, for which he was nominated for a UK Theatre Award as Best Actor in a Leading Role.

=== Film ===
Woodeson's first film work was a role in Heaven's Gate, released in 1980. By chance, he spent more time on location in Montana than any other actor in the film. He has also appeared in, among others, The Russia House (1990), The Pelican Brief (1993), Shooting Fish (1997), The Man Who Knew Too Little (1997) Titanic Town (1998), The Avengers (1998), Mad Cows (1999), Topsy-Turvy (1999), Dreaming of Joseph Lees (1999), Amazing Grace (2006), Hannah Arendt (2012), the James Bond film Skyfall (2012), Mr. Turner (2014), The Danish Girl (2015), Race (2016), Disobedience (2017), The Death of Stalin (2017) and The Hustle (2019).

In 2011/2012 he made the short film You Are Me for the Holocaust Survivors' Centre in London.

=== Television ===
Woodeson's first network television work was playing a US marine in A Rumor of War (1980) starring Brad Davis. He played killer Michael Hennessy in the very first episode of Cracker (1993), starring Robbie Coltrane. In 1998, Woodeson appeared in the Midsomer Murders episode "Death of a Hollow Man" as Avery Philips. He played SS-Gruppenführer Otto Hoffman in the acclaimed BBC/HBO production Conspiracy (2001), starring Kenneth Branagh, Stanley Tucci and Colin Firth. He portrayed Harman Grisewood, in the 2008 TV programme Filth: The Mary Whitehouse Story. He has guest starred on series such as Miami Vice, Midsomer Murders, A Touch of Frost, and Poirot.

In the two 2005–06 HBO/BBC TV series of Rome, he played Posca, the personal slave of Julius Caesar. In 2007, he played Joseph Novak in "Broken Souls", an episode of Foyle's War. In 2010, he appeared as Alexander Grozin, president of the fictional Eastern European state of Turgisia, in DR television production of Borgen. In 2013, he played William Corcoran, a proponent of Lamarckism, in the episode "Am I not Monstrous?" of Ripper Street. He also appeared in Agatha Christie's Poirot "Dead Man's Folly" as Detective Sergeant Hoskins. In 2014, he appeared as Volkov in the American miniseries The Assets, and as Algernon Wyse in a BBC TV adaptation of E. F. Benson's Mapp and Lucia. In 2014, he played Yaakov in The Eichmann Show for the BBC. In 2016, Woodeson played the role of Reverend Matthew Denning in the BBC TV series The Living and the Dead. He has also appeared in episodes of New Tricks, George Gently and Holby City. Woodeson played the lawyer, Thoyt in the BBC One 2017 television drama series Taboo.

== Personal life ==
Woodeson lives in London, but has also lived in the United States.

== Filmography ==
=== Film ===
Year	Title	Role	Red.
1980	Heaven's Gate	Small Man	
1990	The Russia House	Niki Landau	
1993	The Pelican Brief	Stump	
1997	Shooting Fish	Mr. Collyns	
1997	The Man Who Knew Too Little	Sergei	
1998	Titanic Town	Immonger	
1998	The Avengers	Dr. Darling	
1999	Topsy-Turvy	Mr. Seymour	
1999	Mad Cows	Detective Slynne	
1999	Dreaming of Joseph Lees	Mr. Dian	
2001	One of the Hollywood Ten	Ben	
2006	Amazing Grace	Harrison	
2009	Pope Joan	Arighis	
2011	Hysteria	Dr. Richardson	
2012	John Carter	Dalton	
2012	Hannah Arendt	William Shawn	
2012	Skyfall	Dr. Hall	
2014	Mr. Turner	Gentleman Critics	
2015	The Danish Girl	Dr. Buson	
2016	Race	Fred Rubien	
2016	The Limehouse Golem	Toby Dosett	
2016	Letters from Baghdad	George MacMunn	
2017	The Death of Stalin	Boris Bresnavich	
2017	Disobedience	Rabbi Goldfarb	
2017	Paddington 2	Insurance Company C.E.O.	
2018	Beirut	Herzberg	
2019	The Hustle	Albert	
2019	Jarhead: Law of Return	Minister of Defense	
2021	Firebird	Colonel Kuznetsov	
2022	My Father's Secrets	Old Rabbi	
2025	Peter Pan's Neverland Nightmare	Steven	

=== Television ===
Year	Title	Role	Notes	Ref.
1980	Here's Boomer	Theo	Episode: "The Jockey"	
1980	A Rumor of War	Corporal Kazmarak	2 episodes	
1982	The Hound of the Baskervilles	Sir Henry Baskerville	4 episodes	
1984	Piaf	Emil	Television film	
1985	Miami Vice	Artie Cross	Episode: "Made for Each Other"	
1989	Blackeyes	Stilk	Episode #1.1	
1990	Max and Helen	Martin Greenbaum	Television film	
1991	For the Greater Good	Michael Parke-Walsh MP	3 episodes	
1991	The Wolvis Family	Dr. Graham Wilcockson	6 episodes	
1992	A Fatal Inversion	Inspector Winder	2 episodes	
1992	ScreenPlay	Geoff Harris	Episode: "Bad Girl"	
1992	The Life and Times of Henry Pratt	Dr. Hargreaves	Episode #1.3	
1992	The Blackheath Poisonings	Bertie Williams	3 episodes	
1992, 1994	Screen Two	Keith / Roland	2 episodes	
1993	Mr. Wroe's Virgins	Brother Moses	4 episodes	
1993	Bonjour la Classe	Leslie Piper	6 episodes	
1993	Performance	Jorgen Tesman	Episode: "Hedda Gabler"	
1993	Cracker	Hennessy	Episode: "The Mad Woman in the Attic: Part 2"	
1993	The Poetry Hall of Fame	John Keats	Television film	
1994	The Chief	Milverton	Episode #4.8	
1995	Pie in the Sky	Maurice Plummer	Episode: "Brown Bread"	
1995	The Last Englishman	Air Commodore Boyle	Television film	
1997	The Woman in White	Asylum Proprietor	Television film	
1998	Midsomer Murders	Avery Phillips	Episode: "Death of a Hollow Man"	
1998	Animated Epics: Beowulf	Aschere	Television film	
1999	Great Expectations	John Wemmick	Television film	
2000	The Mrs Bradley Mysteries	John Forrester	Episode: "The Rising of the Moon"	
2000	Conspiracy	Otto Hofmann	Television film	
2001	Waking the Dead	Reece Dickson	2 episodes	
2002	Animated Tales of the World	Greengrocer / Leader of Primitives	Episode: "The Crown and Sceptre"	
2002	Helen West	Brian Redwood	3 episodes	
2003	A Touch of Frost	Anton Caldwell	Episode: "Held in Trust"	
2004	The Last Detective	Gerald Leyman	Episode: "Christine"	
2005	Doc Martin	Victor	Episode: "Blood Is Thicker"	
2005–2007	Rome	Posca	17 episodes	
2006	Eleventh Hour	Martin Callan	Episode: "Containment"	
2007	Rough Diamond	Russian Ambassador	Episode: "Old Gold"	
2008	Foyle's War	Josef Novak	Episode: "Broken Souls"	
2008	Poppy Shakespeare	Professor	Television film	
2008	Filth: The Mary Whitehouse Story	Harman Grisewood	Television film	
2009	Red Riding: The Year of Our Lord 1980	Michael Warren	Television film	
2010	Borgen	Alexander Grozin	Episode: "Statsbesøg"	
2011	The Hour	Professor Beckett	2 episodes	
2011	Shameless	Isaac	Episode: "Frank Gallagher: Sent By God"	
2012	Silk	Professor Stephen Nyman	Episode #2.4	
2012	Secret State	Lord Justice Holbeck	Episode #1.2	
2012	Loving Miss Hatto	Erich	Television film	
2013	It's Kevin	Various	Episode #1.6	
2013	Agatha Christie's Poirot	Detective Sergeant Hoskins	Episode: "Dead Man's Folly"	
2013	Ripper Street	Dr. William Corcoran	Episode: "Am I Not Monstrous?"	
2013	The Escape Artist	George Balfour QC	3 episodes	
2013	Moonfleet	Bailiff	2 episodes	
2014	The Assets	Volkov	2 episodes	
2014	The Honourable Woman	Judah Ben-Shahar	4 episodes	
2014	New Tricks	Viktor Proust	Episode: "The English Defence"	
2014	Mapp & Lucia	Algernon Wyse	3 episodes	
2014	Borgia	Alonso Pimental	2 episodes	
2015	The Eichmann Show	Yaakov Jonilowicz	Television film	
2015	Inspector George Gently	Norman	Episode: "Breathe in the Air"	
2016	The Living and the Dead	Matthew Denning	6 episodes	
2016	Friday Night Dinner	Rabbi	Episode: "The Funeral"	
2016–2017	Holby City	Artem Chernik	3 episodes	
2017	Delicious	Allen Billington	Episode: "Funeral Plans"	
2017	Taboo	Robert Thoyt	5 episodes	
2017	Will	Phillip Henslowe	3 episodes	
2019	Baptiste	Peter	Episode: "Shell"	
2020	Quiz	Nicholas Hilliard QC	2 episodes	
2021	Silent Witness	Derek Galton	2 episodes	
2023	A Paris Proposal	Jacques Laurent	Television film	
2024	Father Brown	Bernard Ross	Episode: "The Dead of Night"	
2024	Beyond Paradise	Father Brian	Episode: "#2.4"	
2024	Casualty	Dr. Jack Clayton	Episode: "Ghosts"	
2024	The Lord of the Rings: The Rings of Power	Diarmid	Episode: "Elven Kings Under the Sky"	
2025	Death by Lightning	Major Charles D.A. Loeffler	2 Episodes	
