= Thapelo Mokoena =

South African actor

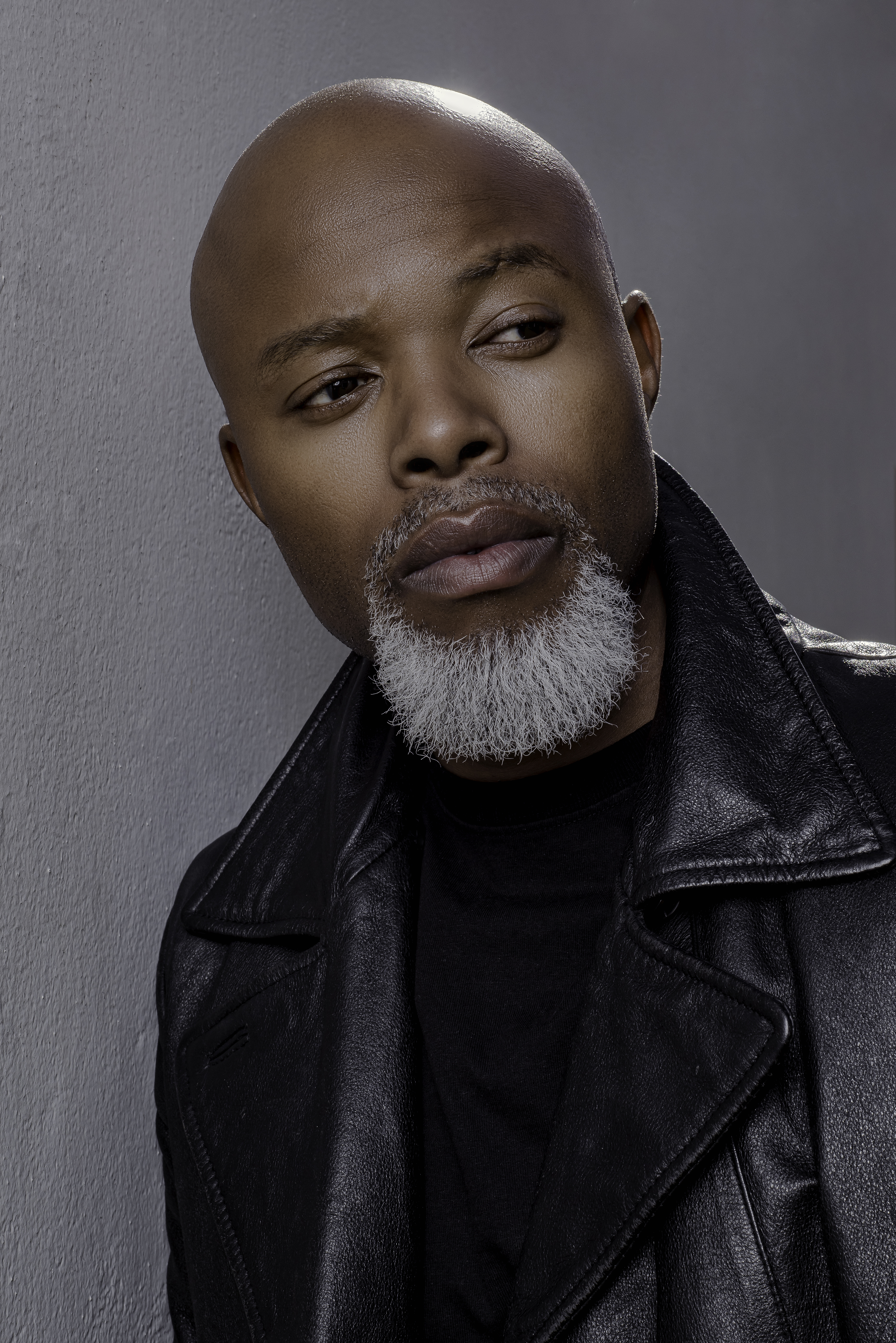
- Thapelo Mokoena
- Born: Thapelo Archibald Sfufane Mokoena; 21 October 1982 (age 44); Ladysmith(Model Kloof), Kwa-Zulu Natal, South Africa
- Occupations: Actor, television presenter
- Known for: Wild at Heart

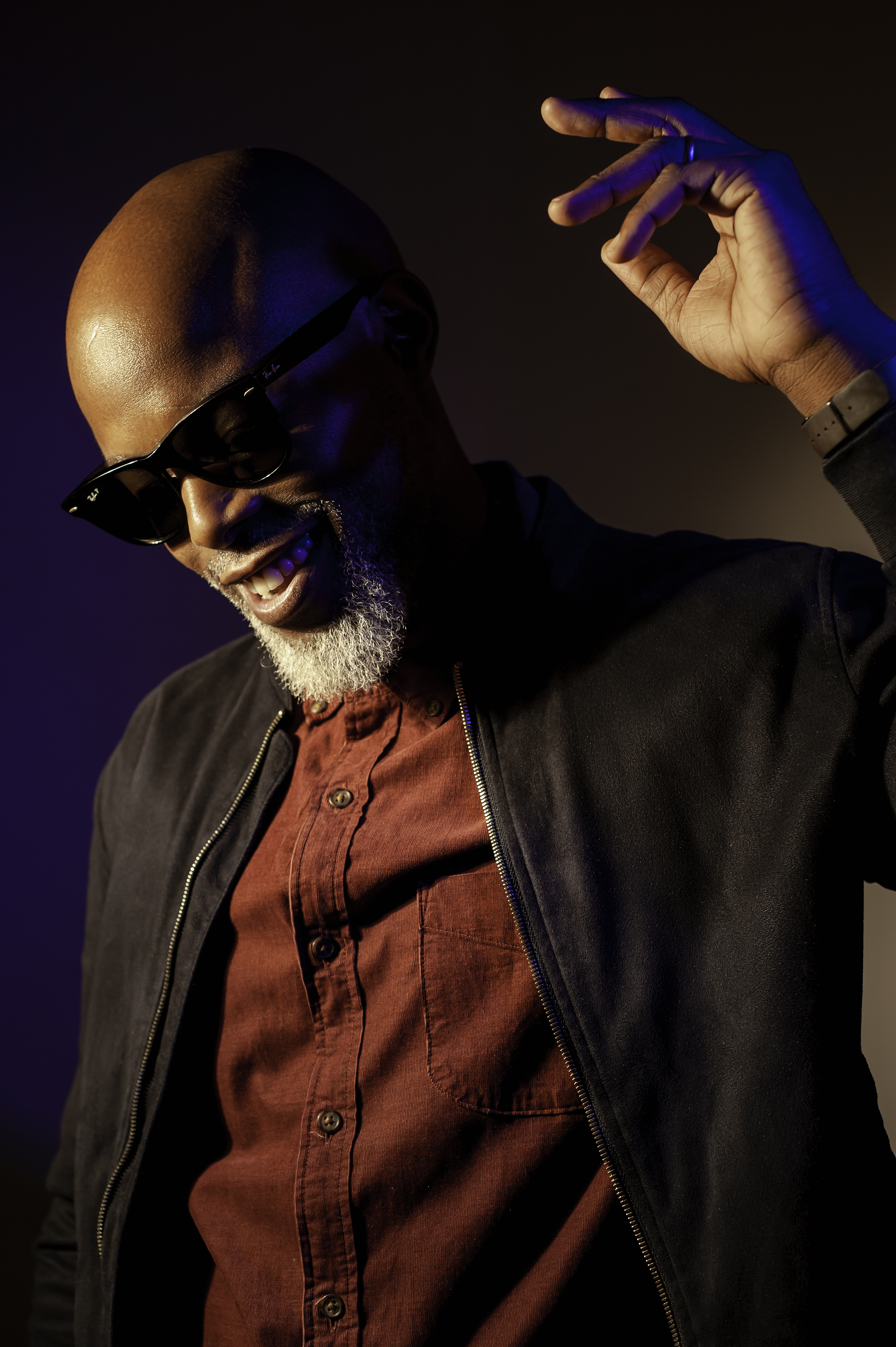
Thapelo Mokoena is a South African actor, television producer and presenter.

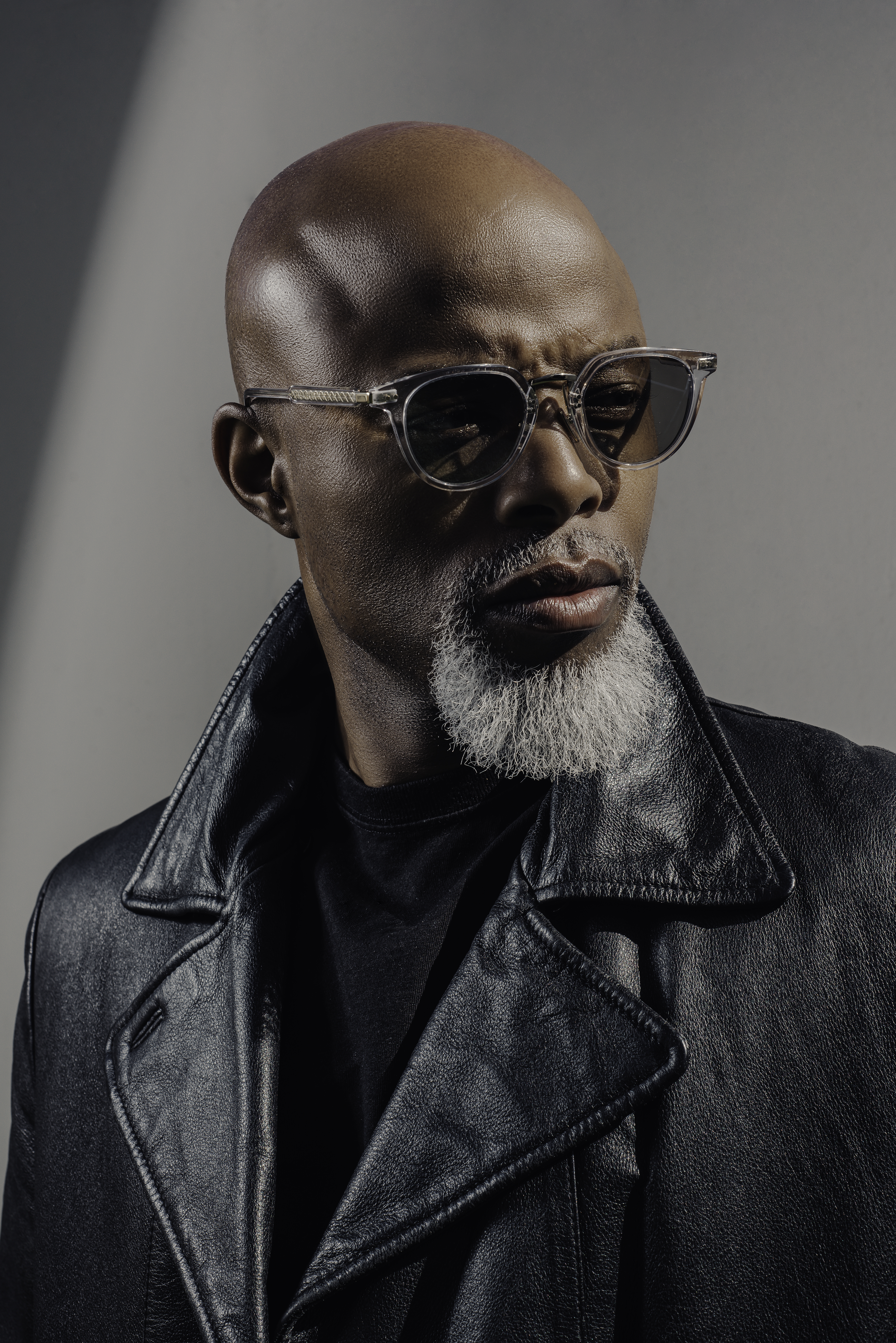
Thapelo Mokoena

Thapelo Mokoena (born 21 October 1982) is a South African actor, television producer and presenter. He is best known for his role on UKs Bulletproof S3 as William, Trackers the series and presenting the first season of the South African version of the reality competition Fear Factor in 2005.

== Work ==
He has also played the role of Cedric Fatani in Wild at Heart from 2007 to 2012. He also played Elias Motsoaledi in the 2013 film Mandela: Long Walk to Freedom. He is the owner of his own production company, Easy Sundays Productions.

He has starred in quite a few movies and television shows, one of which is Between Friends: Ithala. He has played a major role in Nothing for Mahala as well. He also acts on Broken Vows as Uhuru. He played on Mrs Nice Guy in 2016. He played Quinn on the hit series Trackers. He also played William on Sky TV's Bulletproof season 3. He played on Fatal Seduction (2023) Netflix series as Leonard.
