= Horton, Gloucestershire =

Village in Gloucestershire, England

Coordinates: 51.564°N 2.339°W

Horton
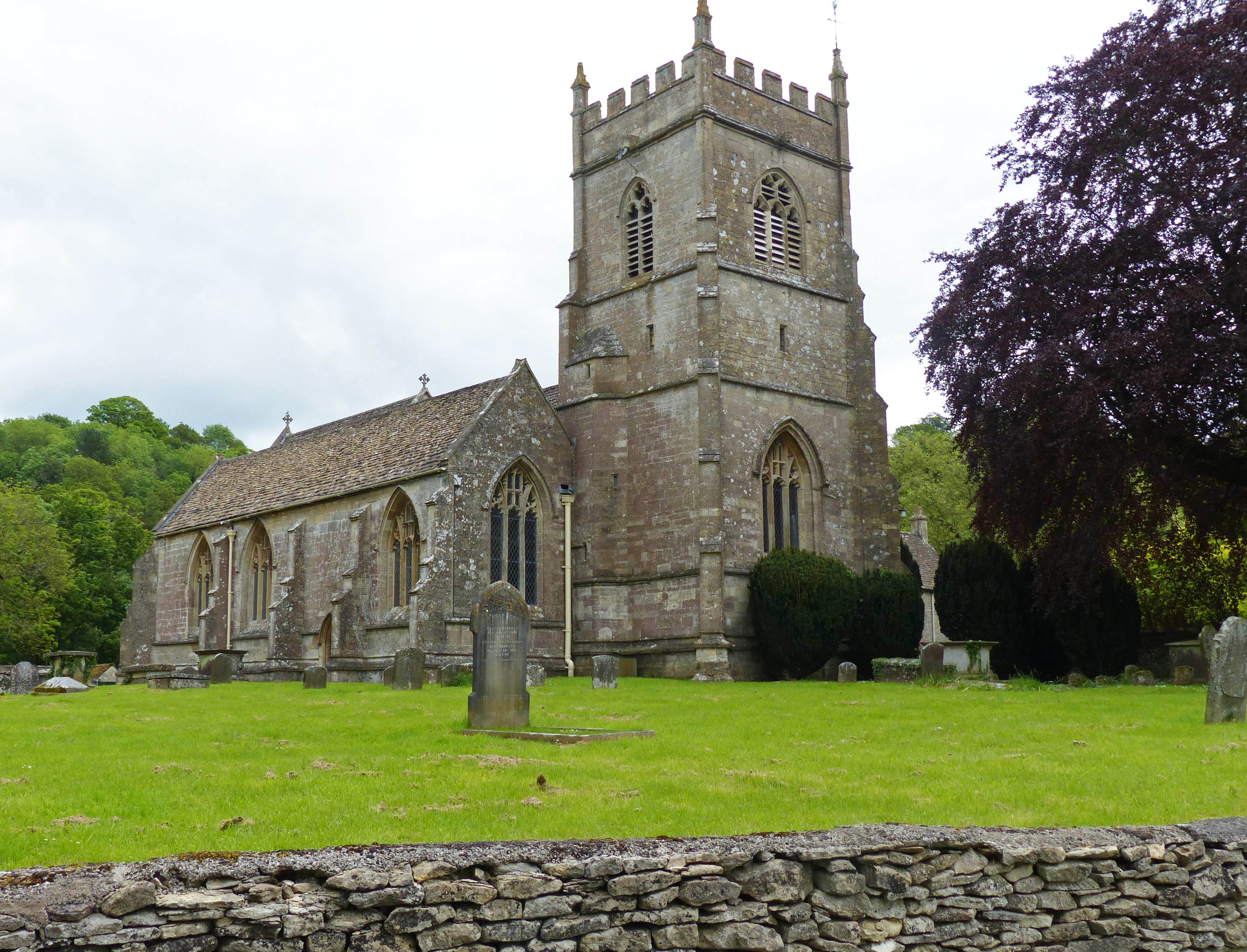
- The Grade I listed church is dedicated to St James the Elder

- Location within Gloucestershire
- Population: 355 (2011)
- OS grid reference: ST726822
- Civil parish: Horton
- Unitary authority: South Gloucestershire
- Ceremonial county: Gloucestershire
- Region: South West
- Country: England
- Sovereign state: United Kingdom
- Post town: BRISTOL
- Postcode district: BS37
- Dialling code: 01454
- Police: Avon and Somerset
- Fire: Avon
- Ambulance: South Western
- UK Parliament: Thornbury and Yate

Horton is a village and civil parish on the Cotswold Edge, in the South Gloucestershire district, in the ceremonial county of Gloucestershire, England. It is about 2 1/2 miles (4.0 km) north of Chipping Sodbury. The nearest settlement is Little Sodbury, about 1 1/2 miles (2.4 km) away; Hawkesbury Upton and Dunkirk are both 2 1/2 miles (4.0 km) miles away. It is a linear settlement built on the slopes of a steep hill. In 2011 the parish had a population of 355. On 1 April 2023 the parish of Little Sodbury was merged with Horton.

The name Horton is a common one in England. It normally derives from Old English horu 'dirt' and tūn 'settlement, farm, estate', presumably meaning 'farm on muddy soil', but the historical forms of this Horton vary, including the Domesday Horedone, Hortune from 1167, and the 1291 form Heorton, the latter of which could point to Old English heort 'stag'.

Horton Court is a manor house, now in the ownership of the National Trust and is a Grade I listed building. The estate is reputed to have at one time been owned by one of King Harold's sons. The oldest part of the house was built as a rectory by Robert de Beaufeu, who was rector of Horton and prebendary of Salisbury. The Norman doorways and windows have rounded arches and the roof is arch-braced and dates to the fourteenth century. It is one of the oldest houses in the country, with parts of the great hall and north wing dating from 1140, with further additions to the north wing added in the fourteenth, fifteenth and eighteenth centuries. The rest of the house was built in 1521 for Willian Knight, who was later the Bishop of Bath and Wells. The house has an L-shaped plan and is constructed of stone with a stone slate roof.

The Anglican church of St James the Elder is also a Grade I listed building, originally built in the twelfth century and rebuilt in the fourteenth century, with alterations in the fifteenth and sixteenth centuries and restorations in 1865.

== Notable people ==
- William Prout (1785—1850), chemist, physician, and natural theologian, was born in Horton
