= Horton Court =

Grade I listed English country house in South Gloucestershire, United Kingdom

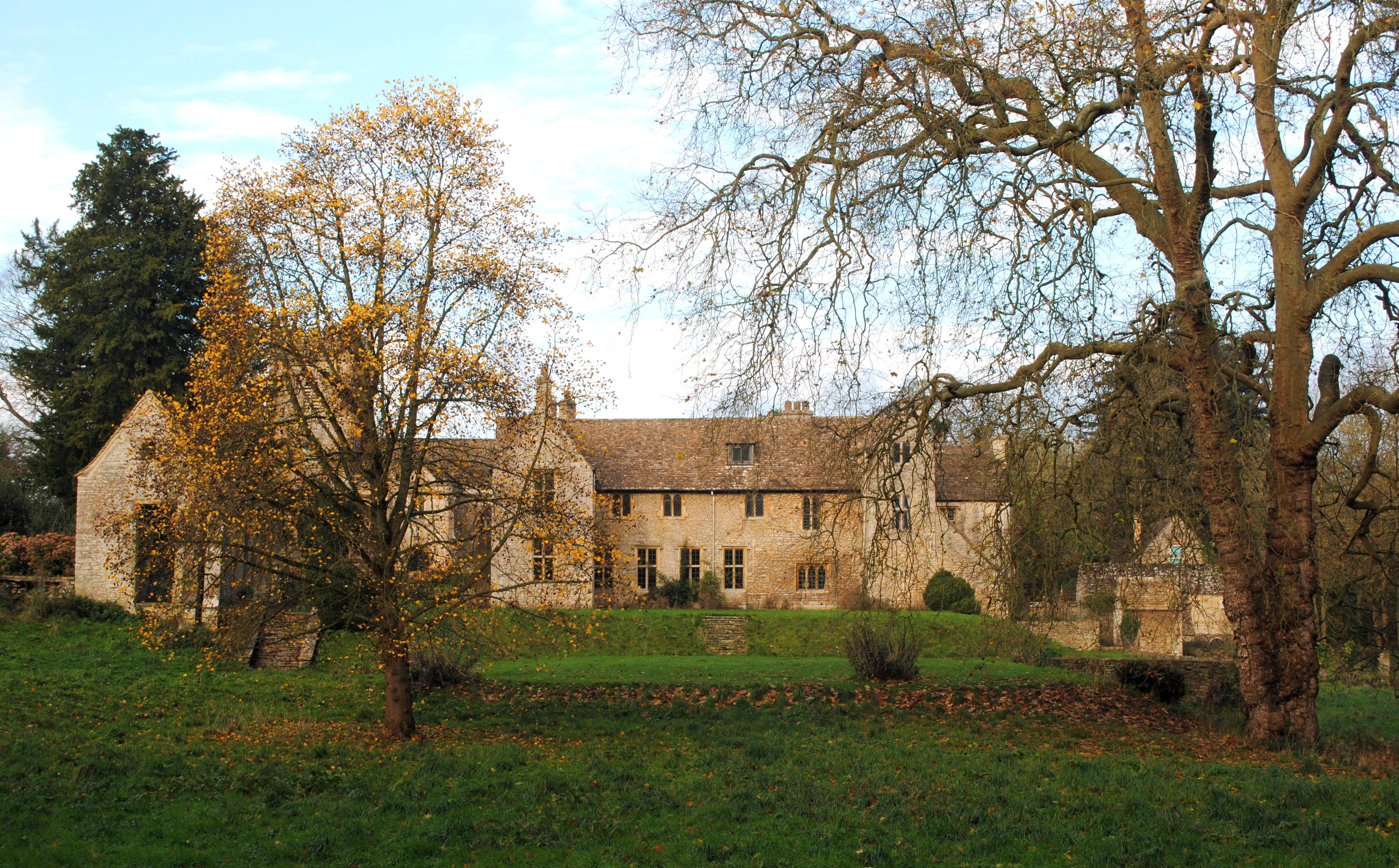
- Horton Court

- Location within Gloucestershire
- 51°33′49″N 2°20′19″W
- Type: Manor house
- Location: Horton, Gloucestershire, England

History
- Built: c.1521

Site notes
- Architectural styles: Tudor & Norman
- Owner: National Trust
- Website: www.nationaltrust.org.uk/holidays/cotswolds-gloucestershire/horton-court

Listed Building – Grade I
- Official name: Horton Court
- Designated: 17 September 1952
- Reference no.: 1114992

Listed Building – Grade I
- Official name: Ambulatory 20 Yards South West Of Horton Court
- Designated: 17 September 1952
- Reference no.: 1321166

Horton Court is a stone-built 16th century manor house in Horton, near Chipping Sodbury, South Gloucestershire, England. It is a grade I listed building.

Originally a Norman manor, the current house was built in about 1521 by Rev. William Knight (d. 1547), Prothonotary to the Holy See, and later Bishop of Bath and Wells. It retains the 12th-century Norman hall, and displays some of the earliest Renaissance decorative motifs used in England. Within the grounds is a grade I listed ambulatory, built for William Knight around 1527–29.

It has been owned by the National Trust since 1949. As of 2021, it is available for holiday lets.

The parish church of St James the Elder is next door.

== History ==
=== See of Sarum ===
Early in the 12th century Hubert de Rye donated the manor to the See of Sarum, which used the revenues to endow a prebend. An early Hubert of Ryes is known in legend as the loyal vassal who saved the life of William the Conqueror in his flight from Valognes during a revolt in 1047. He was the father of Eudo Dapifer. A man by the same name in 1164 donated the church of Aslackby, Lincolnshire, to the Knights Templar. The first known holder of the prebend was Robert de Beaufeu, around 1150. It is believed he was the builder of the Norman great hall, which still survives as the core of the present 16th-century house built by Rev. William Knight (1476–1547), a prebendary from 1517. Knight attended Oxford University and Ferrara University, Italy and travelled to Italy on many occasions on diplomatic missions for King Henry VIII (1509–1547). He attended the king at the Field of the Cloth of Gold in 1521, and in 1527 negotiated with the Pope over Henry's divorce from Catherine of Aragon. He was Bishop of Bath and Wells from 1541 until his death in 1547. During his travels he witnessed the art of the Italian Renaissance. He incorporated some of the motifs he had seen abroad into the new house he built in about 1521 at Horton around the Norman hall, and the house is thus one of the earliest English buildings, comparable to Sutton Place, Surrey, and Hampton Court, to show Renaissance design features, most notably in the grotesque jambs of the front door. His armorials can be seen above the front door and over the entrance hall fireplace, and consist of two addorsed bird's necks and heads emerging from a demi-sun. The supporters are two grotesque mermaids. The crest, which surmounts the escutcheon directly, consists of a prothonotary's hat, which is similar to that of a cardinal, but is black with three rows of tassels in place of five. The detached Italianate ambulatory or loggia built by Knight survives.

=== Paston ===
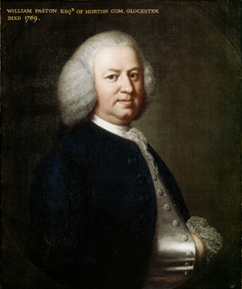
William Paston Esq. Of Horton com. Gloucester. Died 1769. Painted by Thomas Hudson (1701-1779). At Coughton Court, Warwickshire, property of the National Trust, NTPL ref no: 58001

Following the dissolution of the monasteries Horton became crown property in 1550, and King Edward VI (1547–1553) granted it first to his uncle Protector Somerset and then in 1550 after his fall to Sir Edward Paston, the younger son of Sir John Paston the Younger (d.1504), by Margery Brews, daughter of Sir Thomas Brews, who was knighted at the Battle of Stoke in 1487. Sir John's father John Paston (1421–1466), MP for Norfolk in 1460 and 1461, wrote the famous Paston Letters. Horton seems to be an ancestor of Sir Edward Paston (1550–1630), the second son (by Agnes Leigh, daughter of Sir John Leigh of Addington, Surrey and Stockwell) of Sir Thomas Paston, a Gentleman of the Privy Chamber, who in turn was the youngest nephew of Sir Edward Paston, the original grantee in 1550. Sir Thomas Paston's eldest brother Erasmus Paston (1502–1540) was the ancestor of Sir William Paston, 1st Baronet (c. 1610–1663), who was created a baronet in 1642, and whose son was Robert Paston, 1st Earl of Yarmouth (1631–1683). Sir Edward (d.1630), was a godson of King Edward VI. His baroque mural monument can be seen in Blofield Church, Norfolk, 4 miles east of Norwich. He built Appleton Hall, West Newton, Norfolk, where the family lived for several generations until a fire destroyed the house in 1767. They then moved to Horton Court in Gloucestershire. Appleton Hall was later rebuilt and became part of the royal Sandringham Estate, where it was used as a guest house for royal visitors. It became dilapidated during World War II and was demolished in 1984.

==== Paston family monuments ====
A monument in the neighbouring Parish Church of St James the Elder includes the following inscription:

"Beneath this stone resteth the body of the Hon Ann Paston Daughter of the Rt Hon Charles Calvert Baron Baltimore of the Kingdom of Ireland. She was wife to Edward Somerset of Pauntley Court in the County of Gloucestershire Esq. and after his death married John Paston of Horton Court in the said County Esq. She having punctually performed all the duties of a most loving wife, a tender mother, a faithful friend, in the care she took of her last husband's children by his first wife, her dear friend who lies interred by her, ended her life in a most tedious and painful sickness, suffered with the greatest courage and patience, on the 10th February MDCCXXXI (1731) cuius animae propitietur Deus" ("To whose soul may God look on favourably").

Edward Somerset was fourth in descent from Edward Somerset, 4th Earl of Worcester (1553–1628) who had purchased Pauntley Court, near Newent, Gloucestershire, from Sir Henry Poole of Sapperton, Gloucestershire, whose family had inherited it by marriage to Eleanor Whittington, one of the five daughters of Thomas Whittington, eldest son of John Whittington (d.1525). John Paston had sometimes resided at Pauntley, which his second wife Anne Calvert must have held as her dower.

Other monuments in the north aisle of the church to the Paston family include:

- William Paston, died c. 1673, baroque, grey and white marbles, segmental pediment, winged cherubic heads, gadrooned base;
- John Paston, died 1737 aged 67, grey and white marble, flat obelisk inscribed panel with gadrooned base, heraldry. He married as his second wife Anne Calvert (d.1731), whose monument has been described above. He had by his first wife a son Edward who died young in 1710,. He was probably the father of William Paston (see below).
- William Paston, died 1769, by James Paty of Bristol, coloured and white marbles, gadrooned sarcophagus, heraldry and inscribed plinth. This is probably the son of John Paston (1670–1737) whose monument is listed above, by his first wife Frances Tichborne (d.1712) who was buried at Horton.

Sir George Throckmorton (1721–1767), only son of Sir Robert Throckmorton, 4th Baronet of Coughton Court, Warwickshire, married Anna Maria Paston, daughter and sole heiress of William Paston (d.1769) of Horton by his wife Mary Courtenay (d.1747), the heiress of Molland in Devon. Anna Maria was also a co-heiress of Thomas Arundell, 4th Baron Arundell of Wardour (1633–1712).

=== Brooke ===
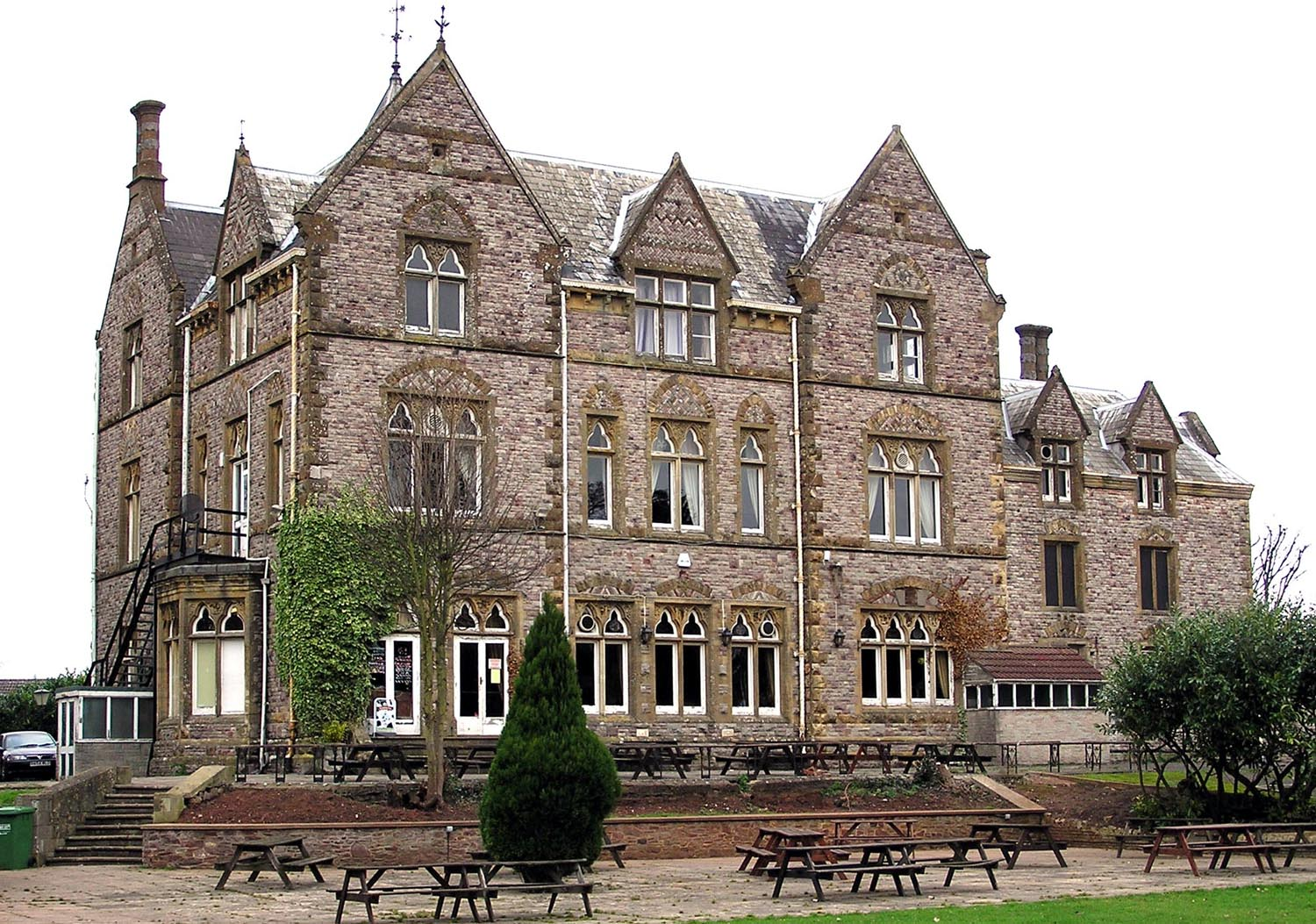
Stanshaw's Court, Yate, Bristol

The last of the Pastons mortgaged Horton Court to FitzHerbert Brooke, Esq., of Stanshaw's Court, Yate, a solicitor, who foreclosed and became himself the proprietor of the manor soon after 1800. It was noted by Philip Bliss (1787–1857):

"The last of the family lived at Horton, and becoming involved, fell into the hands of an attorney in the neighbourhood, to whom he ultimately became so indebted, that dying, he paid his debt by leaving the estate to this gentleman. There was, if I rightly remember, a suit at law in consequence, which, at the time, occasioned a great sensation in the County, and on the production of the Will, which (having been proved in some Consistory Court in the country, and erroneously sought for in the Prerogative Court in London only) was supposed not to exist, the cause was immediately decided in favour of the attorney."

The following mural tablet exists in the south transept of Old Sodbury Church:

"In memory of Fitzherbert Brooke of Stanshaw Court Esq. who died MDCCCXXV (1825) in the 49th year of his age. Also Theresa-Francis, relict of the above who died March 6th MDCCCXXX (1830) aged 51. And of their eldest son, Fitzherbert-Hartley who died in the 18th year of his age, November 15th 1830."

=== Richards ===
Horton Court passed to his grandson Sir Frederick Richards (1833–1912), Admiral of the Fleet, who had married his daughter Lucy Fayle Brooke (d.1880), which marriage was without progeny. Richards made extensive alterations in 1884.

=== Wills ===
In 1937 Horton Court was purchased by Miss Hilda Proctor Wills (1880-13/5/1946), daughter of Sir George Alfred Wills, 1st Bt of Blagdon (1854–1928) by his wife Susan Britton Proctor (1856–1904). She was thus a member of the Bristol-based Wills family, proprietors of the Imperial Tobacco Company of Bristol. When she died in 1946, she left the property to the National Trust in memory of her nephew Sir George Peter Vernon Wills, 3rd Baronet of Blagdon (1922–1945), of the Coldstream Guards, who had been killed in action in Italy.

=== Filming ===
Horton Court has been used as a filming location in several television series including the BBC's Poldark, The Living and the Dead and Wolf Hall.

=== National Trust ===
It was listed in 1952.

The house was empty from 2008 to 2011 but the National Trust opened the ground floor during July and August 2011 and were considering how to make it more readily accessible to the public. Renovations began in 2018 and were completed in 2018, at a cost of £1,770,000. The property has been available for holiday lets since 2019.

== Gallery ==
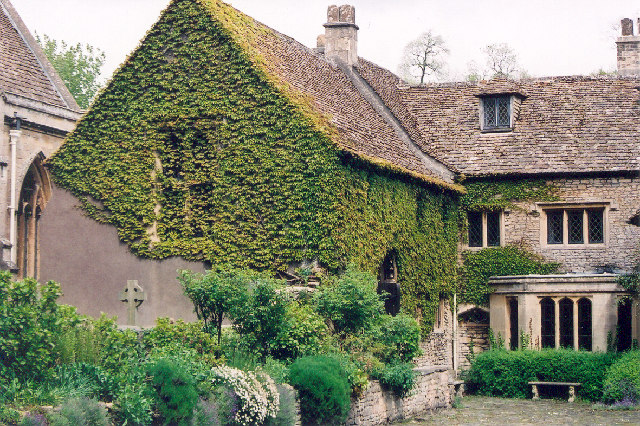
The Norman wing in 2005

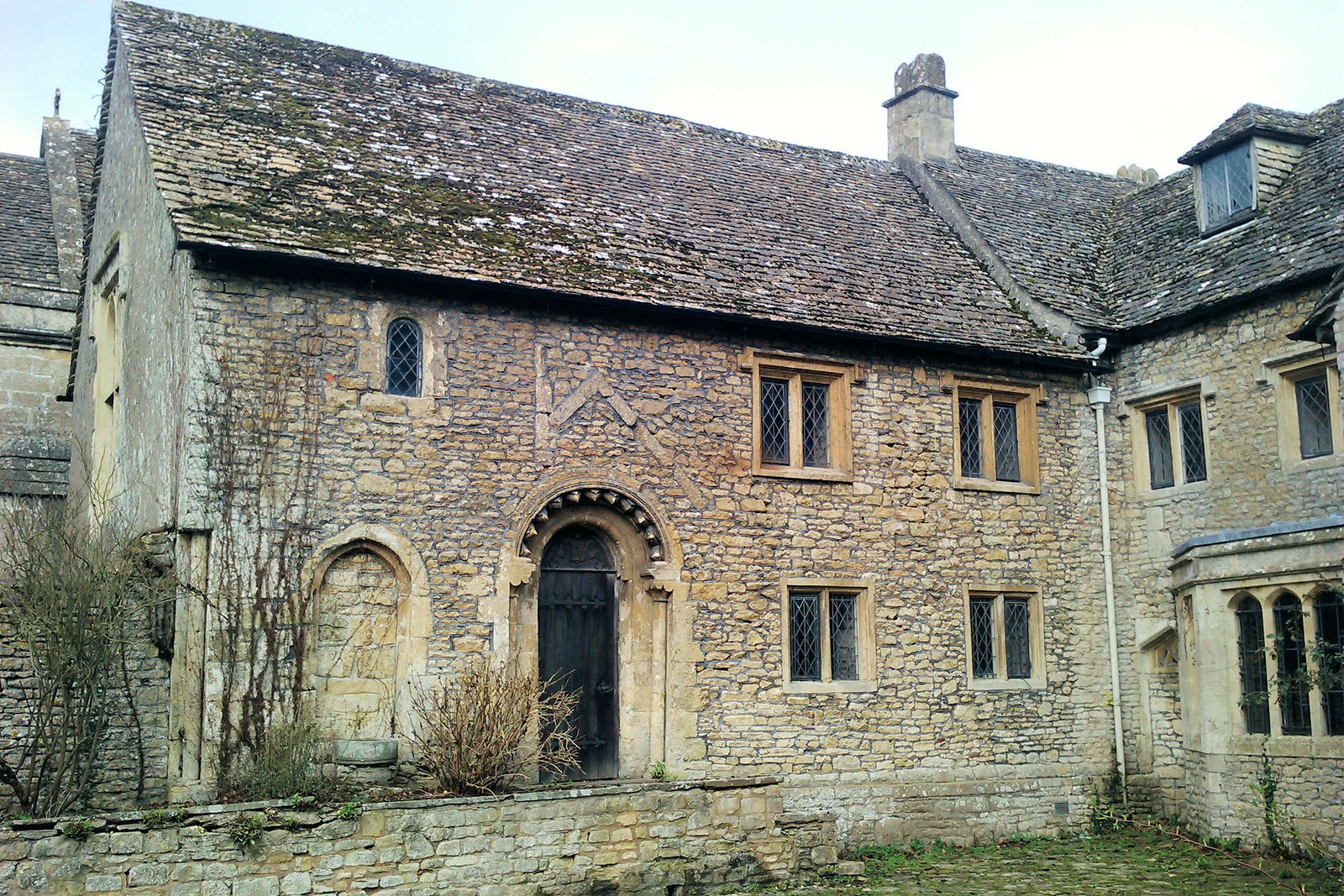
After National Trust work in 2014

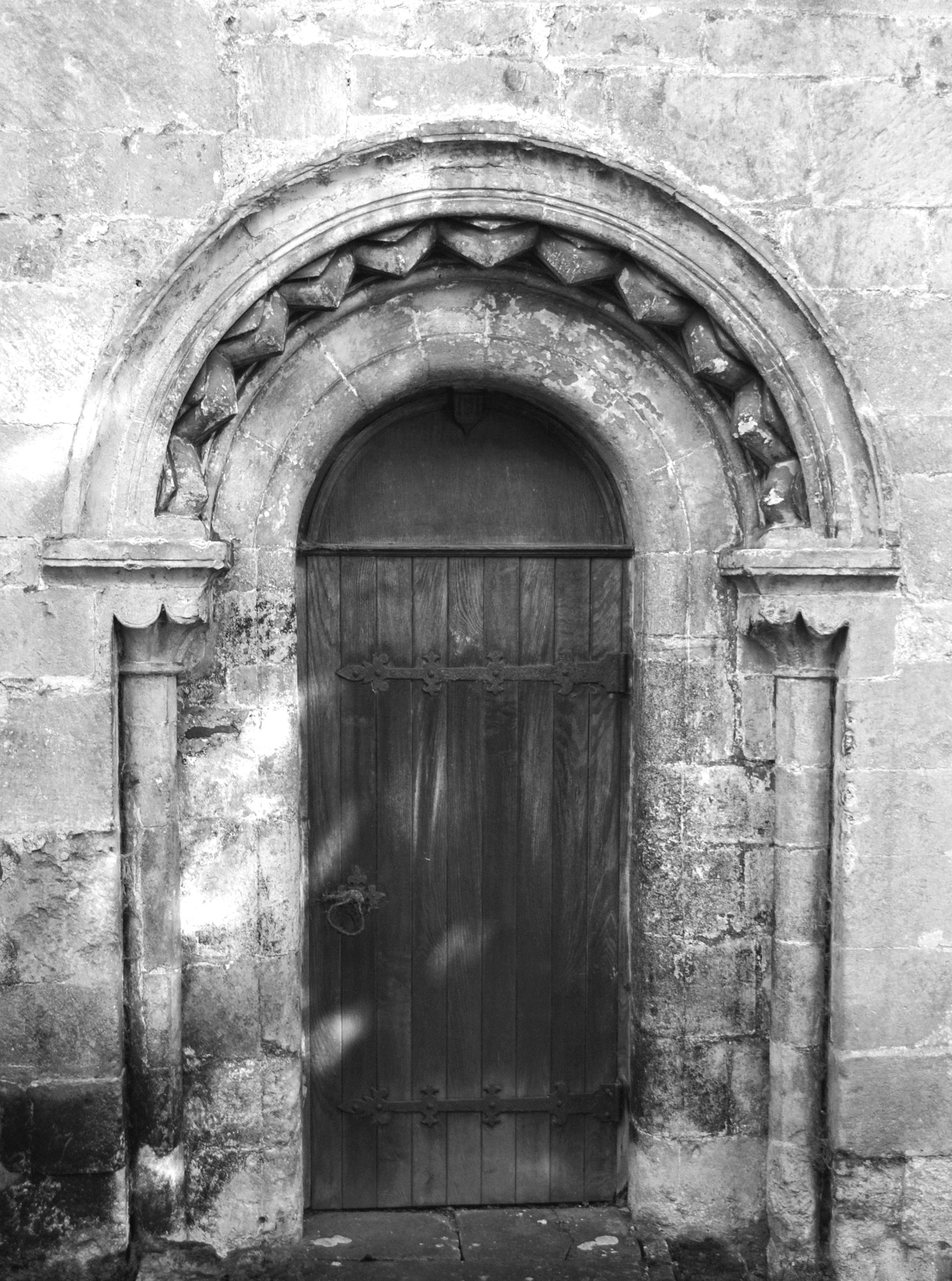
12th-century doorway

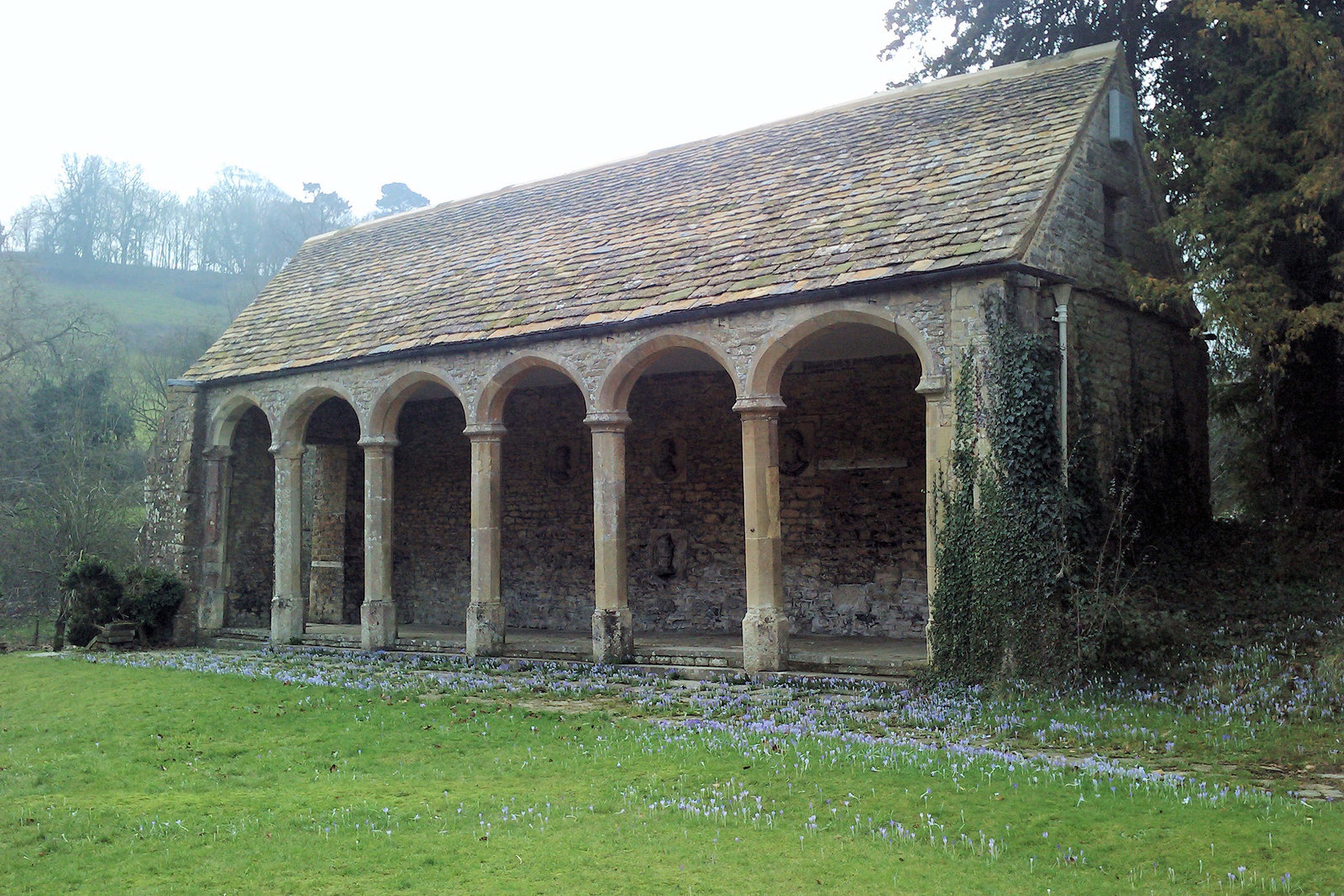
16th-century Ambulatory in 2005
