= Ambulatory =

Covered passage in a large church

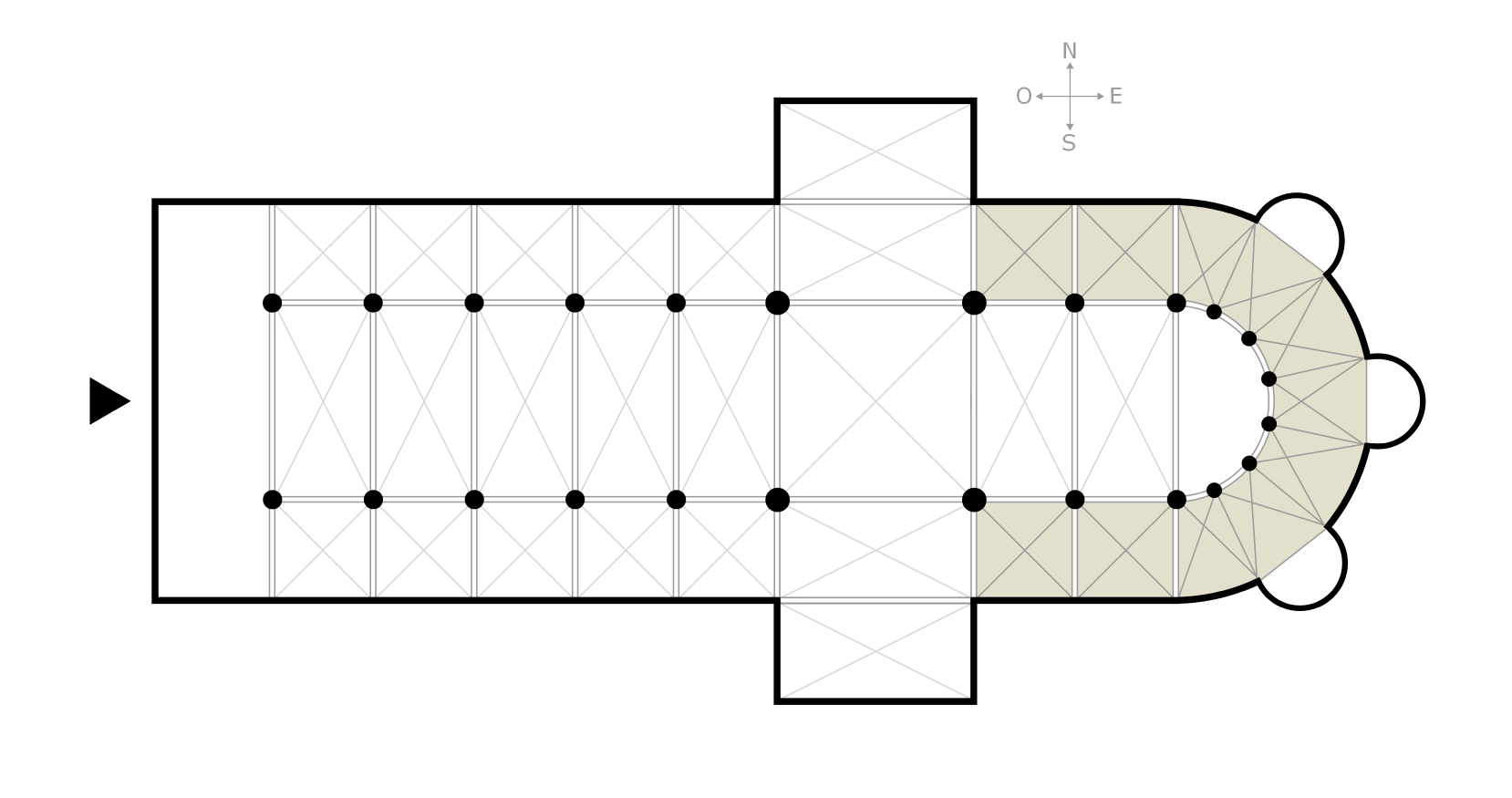
The placement of the ambulatory within a standard cathedral.

The ambulatory (Latin: ambulatorium 'walking place') is the covered passage around a cloister or the processional way around the east end of a cathedral or large church and behind the high altar. The first ambulatory was in France in the 11th century but by the 13th century ambulatories had been introduced in England and many English cathedrals were extended to provide an ambulatory.

The same feature is often found in Indian architecture and Buddhist architecture generally, especially in older periods. Ritual circumambulation or parikrama around a stupa or cult image is important in Buddhism and Hinduism. Often the whole building was circumambulated, often many times. The Buddhist chaitya hall always allowed a path for this, and the Durga temple, Aihole (7th or 8th century) is a famous Hindu example.

The term is also used to describe a garden feature in the grounds of a country house. A typical example is the one shown, which stands in the grounds of Horton Court in Gloucestershire, England.

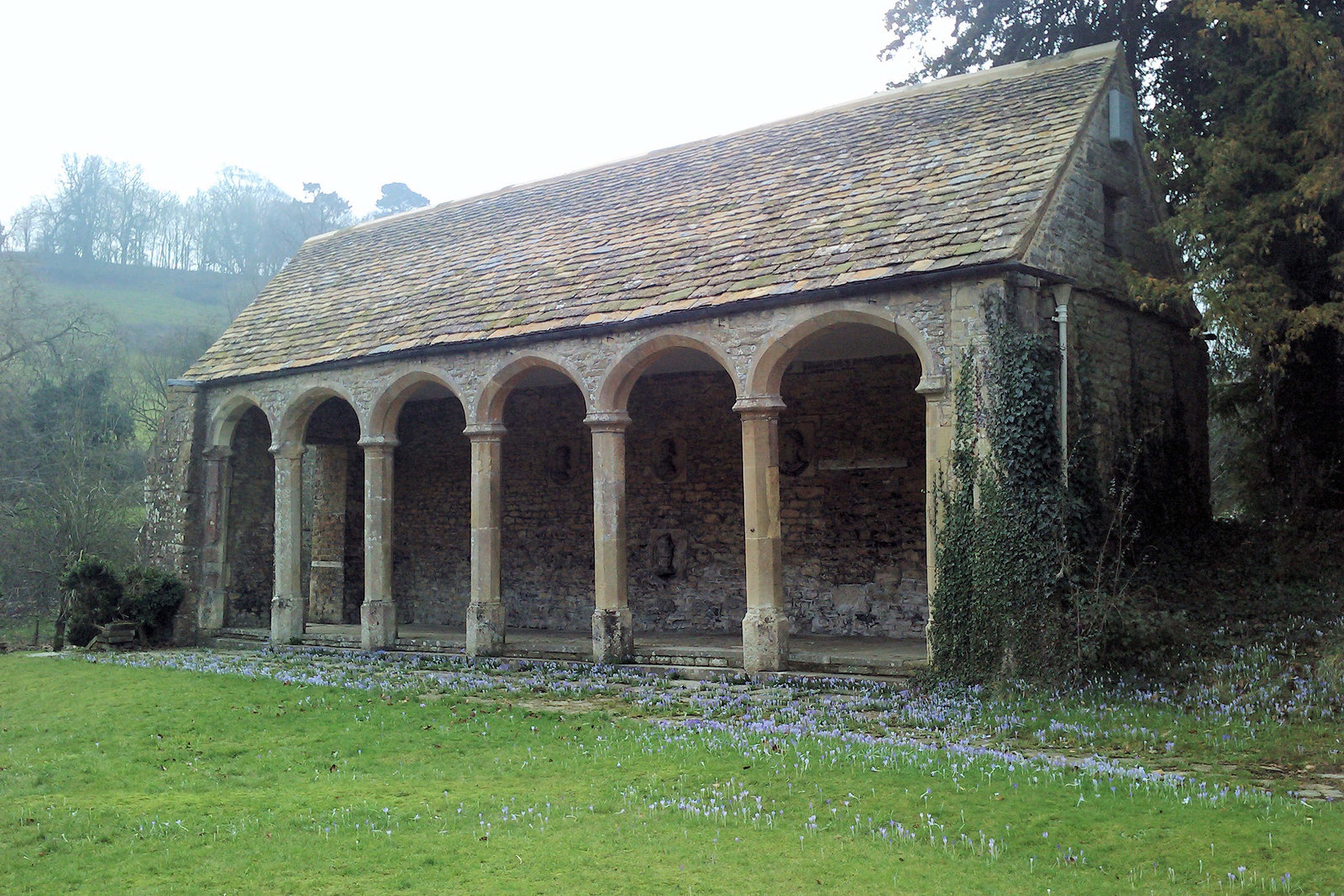
Horton Court ambulatory, c.1527

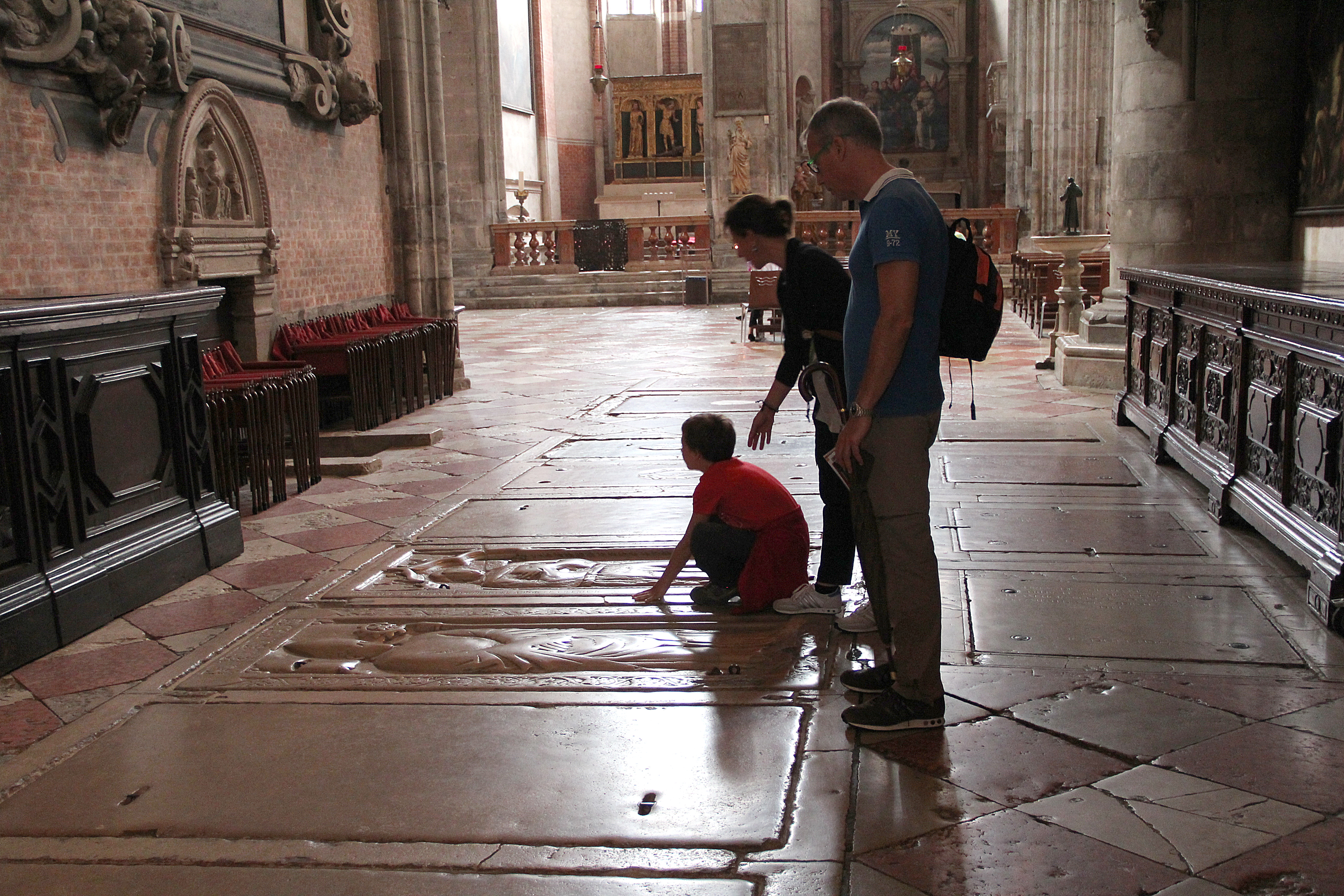
Ambulatory of Santa Maria Gloriosa dei Frari in Venice.

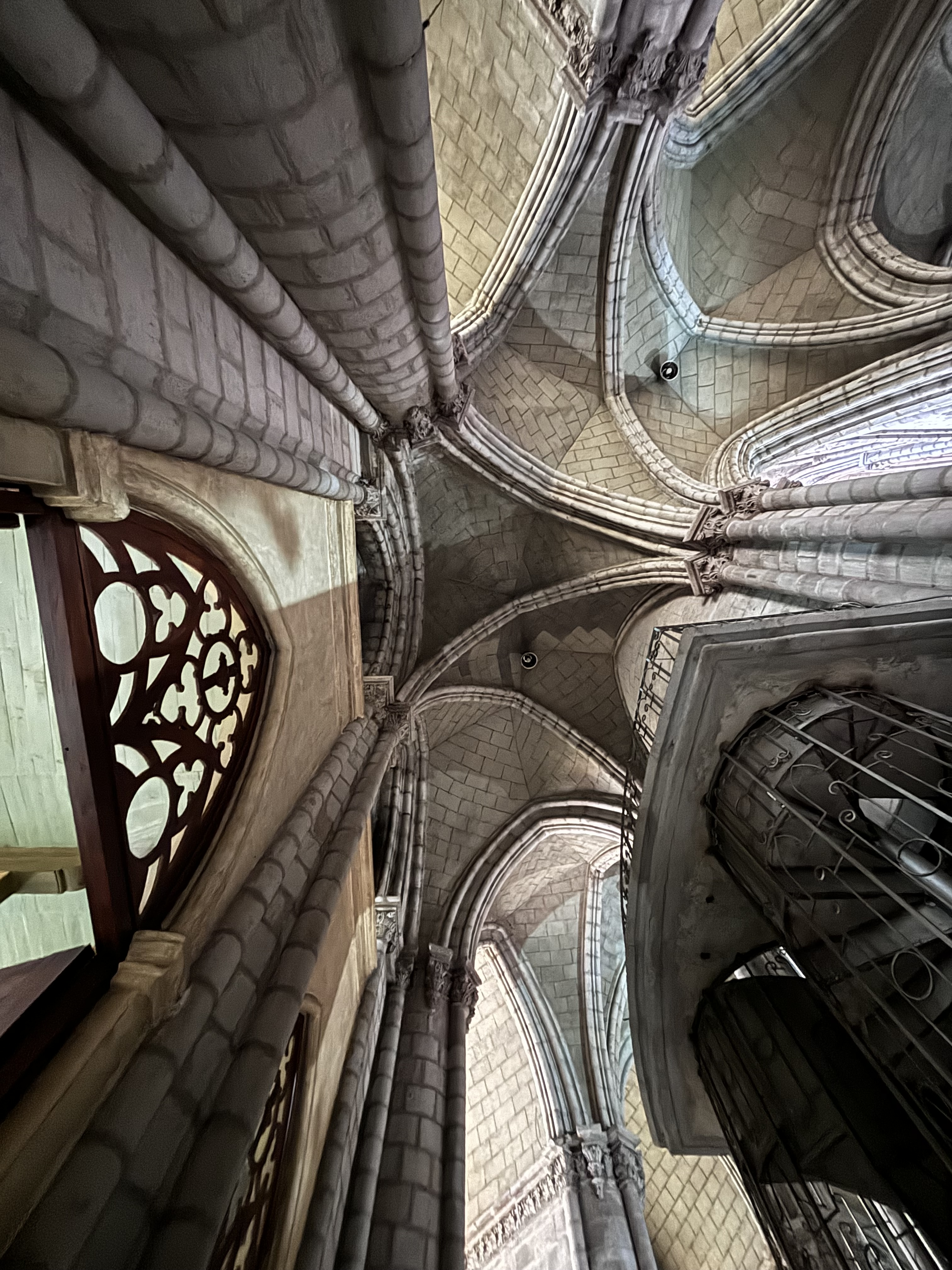
Ambulatory of the Basilica of the National Vow in Quito.

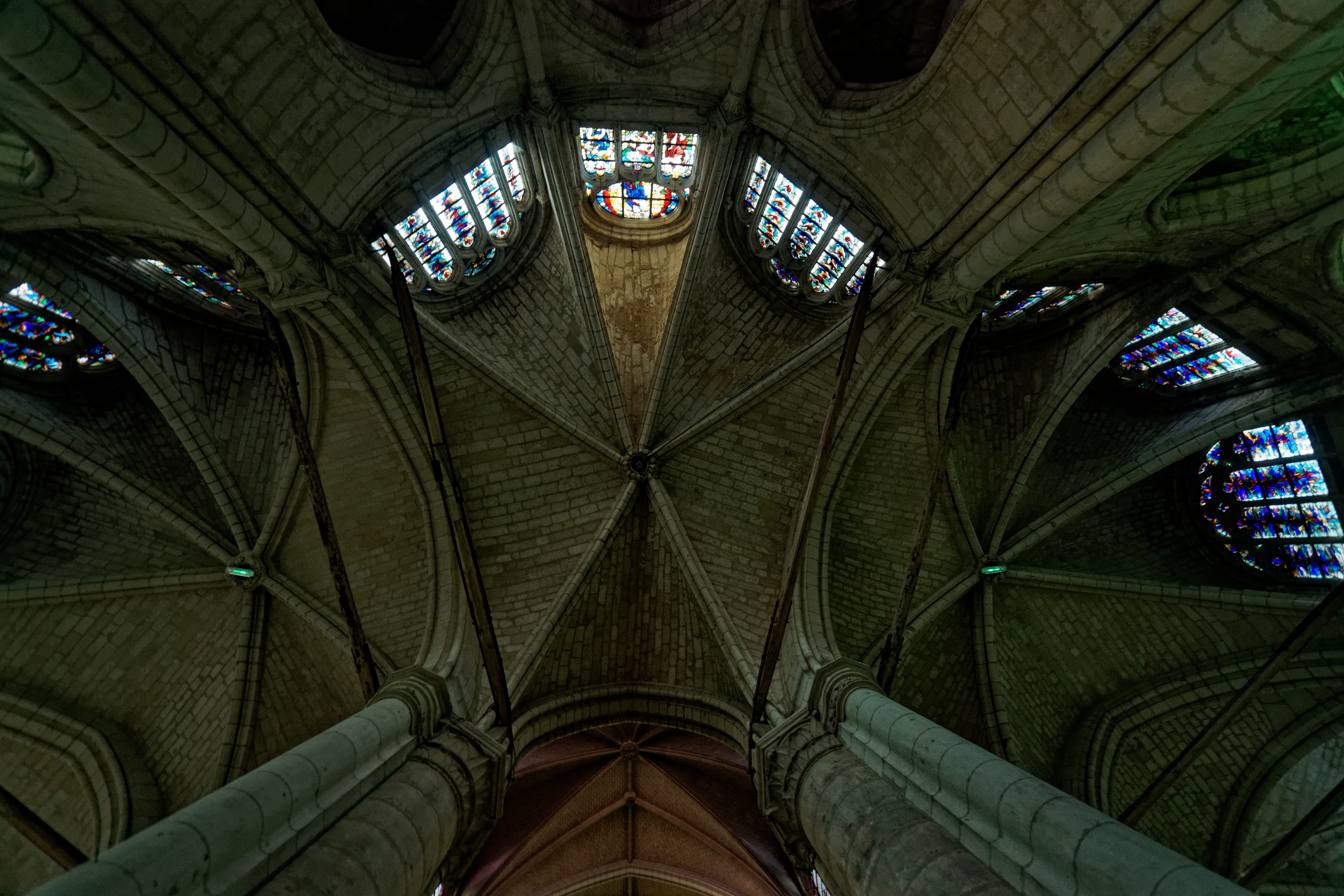
Ambulatory of the Basilica of Saint-Quentin in Saint-Quentin.

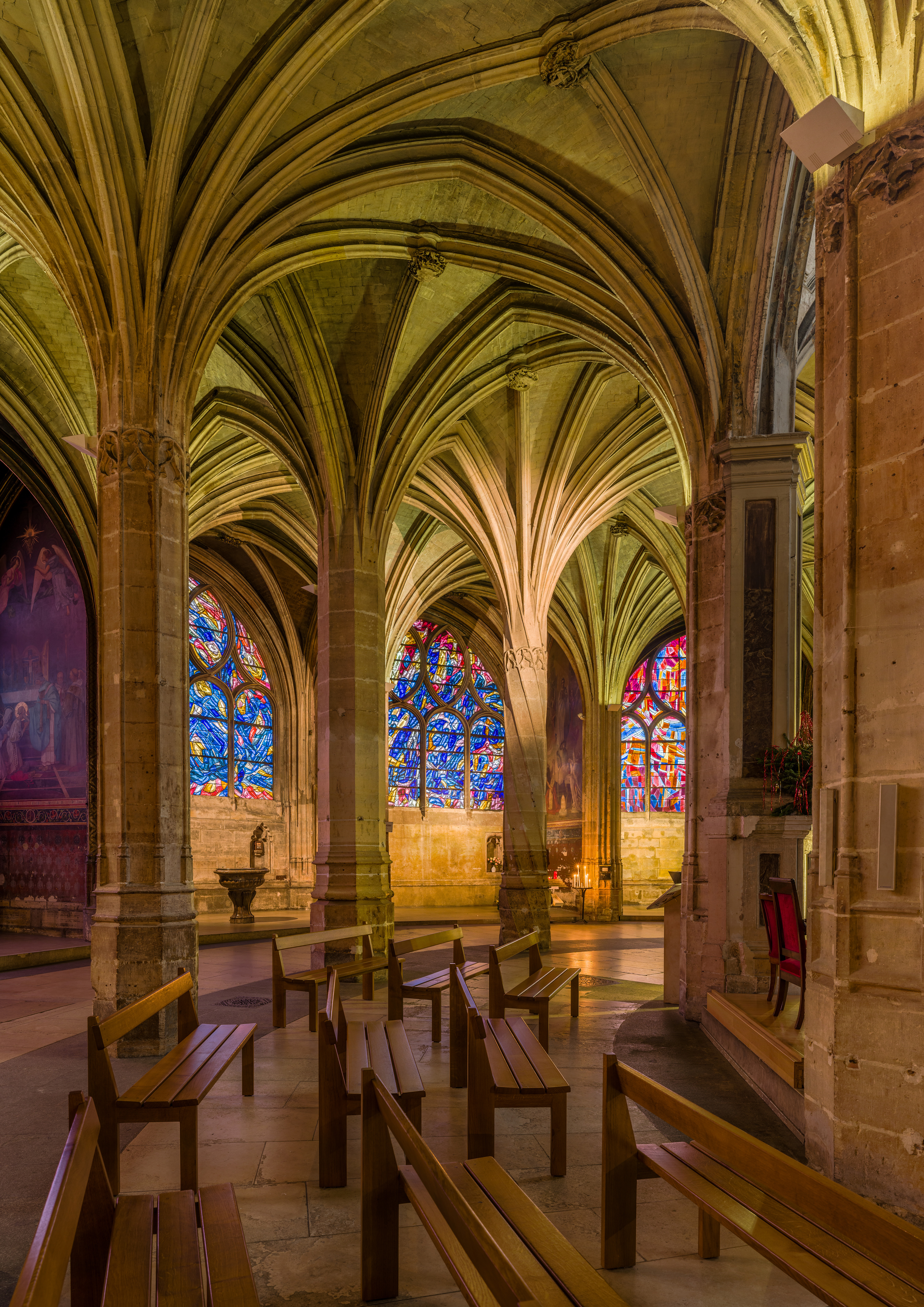
Ambulatory of Saint-Séverin in Paris.

== See also ==
- List of architectural vaults
- Scarcella
