= Robert de Beaufeu =

- Occupation: secular canon
- Known for: poet

Robert de Beaufeu (died in or before 1219) (Latinised to de Bello Fago or de Bello Foco, meaning "from a beautiful fireplace") was a secular canon of Salisbury and a minor poet.

== Life ==
Educated at the University of Oxford, he gained, at an early age, a reputation for learning, and became the friend of Gerald of Wales, Walter Map, and other scholars. He was granted the prebend of Horton, near Chipping Sodbury, Gloucestershire, where he built a hall house, part of which survives in the structure of the present 16th century Horton Court.

== Works ==
He is said have written a work entitled Encomium topographiae, after hearing the Topographia Hiberniae (c.1188) of Gerald of Wales read by the author at a festival at Oxford. His authorship of this piece depends on Gerald of Wales's self-serving story reporting the praise that Robert gave to Gerald's Topographia Hiberniae.

A poem in praise of ale, Versus de commendatione cervisiae, in a manuscript in the Cambridge University Library, MS Gg.6.42, bears his name. It has been argued as suggesting ("according to stereotypes established by Alcuin, Reginald of Canterbury, and Henry of Avranches") that he was an Englishman.
