= Moonfleet (2013 TV series) =

- Genre: Adventure
- Based on: Moonfleet by J. Meade Falkner
- Written by: Ashley Pharoah
- Directed by: Andy De Emmony
- Starring: Ray Winstone
- Country of origin: United Kingdom
- Original language: English
- No. of series: 1
- No. of episodes: 2

Production
- Running time: 44 minutes
- Production company: Company Pictures

Original release
- Network: Sky One
- Release: 28 December – 29 December 2013

Moonfleet is a British period television drama series which aired on Sky One in 2013. It is based on the classic 1898 adventure novel Moonfleet by J. Meade Falkner, about smuggling on the Dorset coast in the eighteenth century. Location shooting took place in Ireland.

== Cast ==
- Ray Winstone as Elzevir Block
- Aneurin Barnard as John Trenchard
- Sophie Cookson as Grace Mohune
- Anthony Ofoegbu as Loder
- Phil Daniels as Ratsey
- Lorcan Cranitch as Meech
- Pippa Haywood as Aunt Lydia
- Nick Lee as Officer James
- Ian McElhinney as Reverend Glennie
- Lesley Vickerage as Aunt Jane
- Ben Chaplin as Magistrate Mohune
- Fionn Walton as Davey Block
- Frank O'Sullivan as "Blackbeard"
- Omid Djalili as Aldobrand 2
- Steve Gunn as Jailer
- Martin Trenaman as Turn-Key
- Nicholas Woodeson as Bailiff
