= St James the Elder, Horton =

Church in Gloucestershire, England

Coordinates: 51°33′49.68″N 2°20′20.4″W

St James the Elder, Horton is a parish church in Horton, Gloucestershire. It is a Grade I listed building. It was originally built in the twelfth century and rebuilt in the fourteenth century, with alterations in the fifteenth and sixteenth centuries and restorations in 1865. It was listed in 1961.

The church contains monuments to Ann Austin (died 1731), the Paston family, and Francis Charles Owen, Baron de Tuyll (1885-1952).

The church is next door to Horton Court.
