= The Living and the Dead (TV series) =

British supernatural drama television series

- Genre: Horror; Drama; Occult detective fiction
- Created by: Ashley Pharoah
- Directed by: Alice Troughton; Sam Donovan
- Starring: Colin Morgan; Charlotte Spencer
- Country of origin: United Kingdom
- Original language: English
- No. of series: 1
- No. of episodes: 6

Production
- Executive producers: Ashley Pharoah; Faith Penhale; Katie McAleese
- Producer: Eliza Mellor
- Production locations: Gloucestershire, England
- Cinematography: Matt Gray BSC Eps 1-3; Suzie Lavelle
- Running time: 60 minutes
- Production companies: BBC America; BBC Cymru Wales; Monastic Productions; Lookout Point Ltd.

Original release
- Network: BBC One; BBC America
- Release: 28 June – 2 August 2016

The Living and the Dead is a British six-episode supernatural horror television series created by Ashley Pharoah that aired in 2016. The plot revolves around Nathan Appleby (played by Colin Morgan) and his wife, Charlotte Appleby (played by Charlotte Spencer), whose farm is believed to be at the centre of numerous supernatural occurrences.

== Cast ==
=== Main cast ===
- Colin Morgan as Nathan Appleby, a pioneering Victorian psychologist who moves to his family's estate in Somerset and encounters disturbing events
- Charlotte Spencer as Charlotte Appleby, a pioneering photographer who accompanies her husband to try to turn the farm's fortunes around
- Nicholas Woodeson as Reverend Matthew Denning

=== Supporting cast ===
- Isaac Andrews as Charlie Thatcher
- Elizabeth Berrington as Maud Hare
- Sarah Counsell Lizzie Merrifield
- Robert Emms as Peter Hare
- Amber Fernée as Bathsheba Thatcher
- Joel Gillman as Jack Langtree
- Tallulah Haddon as Harriet Denning
- Kerrie Hayes as Gwen Pearce
- Liam McMahon as Tinker
- David Oakes as William Payne
- Marianne Oldham as Mary Denning
- Harry Peacock as Smith
- Chloe Pirrie as Lara
- Pooky Quesnel as Agnes Thatcher
- Malcolm Storry as Gideon Langtree
- Steve Oram as John Roebuck

== Production ==
=== Development ===
The series was created by Life on Mars and Ashes to Ashes co-creator Ashley Pharoah. Pharoah's creative partner Matthew Graham was initially attached to the series, but withdrew prior to its production to work on Childhood's End for SyFy. The series is directed by Alice Troughton and Sam Donovan.

=== Casting ===
On 5 June 2015, Colin Morgan and Charlotte Spencer were announced to join the cast.

=== Filming ===
The Living and the Dead production was based in the Bottle Yard Studios in Bristol, England. The primary filming location was Horton Court in Gloucestershire.

The six-part BBC One TV Series began rehearsals on 29 July 2015, and shooting commenced in the West Country on 3 August 2015, with an official announcement about the series on 7 August 2015. Filming concluded on 18 December 2015.

On 12 August 2016, BBC had officially stated that the series would not be renewed for a second series.

=== Music ===
Bristol-based duo The Insects were commissioned to write the score for the series. The first episode features the traditional song "She Moved Through the Fair" sung by Elizabeth Fraser, plus the Anglican hymn "Immortal, Invisible, God Only Wise" at the ploughman's funeral. Another recurring song is "The Reaper's Ghost", composed by Richard Dyer-Bennet in 1935. The theme song lyrics are a slightly modernized version of the opening stanza of Lyke-Wake Dirge.

== Episodes ==
No. overall	Episode	Directed by	Written by	Original release date	UK viewers (millions)
1	Episode 1	Alice Troughton	Ashley Pharoah	28 June 2016	3.99
In 1894, Nathan Appleby and his wife Charlotte return to the family farm after his mother's death. A teenage girl is possessed by the ghost of an evil local man who died without being baptised.
2	Episode 2	Alice Troughton	Ashley Pharoah	5 July 2016	N/A
A young boy is haunted by the ghosts of five workhouse orphans who suffocated years earlier in an accident in the tin mine owned by Appleby's grandfather.
3	Episode 3	Alice Troughton	Ashley Pharoah & Simon Tyrrell	12 July 2016	N/A
An outbreak of black beetles and a storm threaten the wheat harvest. A schizophrenic young man receives instructions to kill his mother from the ghost of a wise woman drowned as a witch in 1861.
4	Episode 4	Sam Donovan	Ashley Pharoah & Robert Murphy	19 July 2016	N/A
Appleby's farm machinery is sabotaged by a fugitive Luddite. a former employee with a grudge. The restless spirit of a murdered girl returns to expose her killer, the village schoolmistress.
5	Episode 5	Sam Donovan	Peter McKenna	26 July 2016	N/A
The villagers celebrate Halloween. The ghosts of Roundhead troops appear on the anniversary of a bloody English Civil War battle.
6	Episode 6	Sam Donovan	Simon Tyrrell	2 August 2016	N/A
The ghostly apparitions in the village and Appleby's growing insanity are revealed to be the result of meddling by his great great granddaughter, a 21st century paranormal investigator haunted by the restless spirit of Appleby's drowned son.

== Reception ==
Review aggregator website Rotten Tomatoes gave Series 1 an approval rating of 83%, with an average rating of 6.33 out of 10 based on 12 critics. The site's critical consensus is, "This throwback to classic gothic tales of yore is ideal viewing for audiences seeking a spooky sit without intense jolts and shocks."
