= Ashley Pharoah =

British screenwriter (born 1959)

- Born: 13 September 1959 (age 67); Southampton, United Kingdom
- Education: Queen Elizabeth's Hospital; University of Sussex; National Film And Television School.
- Occupations: Screenwriter and television producer.
- Writing career
- Genres: Drama, science fiction
- Notable works: Life on Mars; Ashes to Ashes; Wild at Heart
- Notable awards: International Emmy

Ashley Pharoah (born 13 September 1959) is a British screenwriter and television producer. He is best known as the co-creator/writer of the successful drama series Life on Mars, which began on BBC One in 2006, and creator/writer of the family drama Wild at Heart, which aired on ITV1 from 2006 until 2012.

== Early life ==
Born in Southampton in 1959 but soon moved to Nailsea in North Somerset. Attended Queen Elizabeth's Hospital School in Bristol where his classmates included the actor Hugo Weaving and the football commentator Jonathan Pearce. Studied English at the University of Sussex and screenwriting at the National Film and Television School, where his graduation film was nominated for a BAFTA. Played rugby for Wimbledon RFC.

== Career ==
Whilst still at the National Film & Television School, Pharoah co-wrote the film "White Elephant", which was directed by Werner Grusch and starred Peter Firth. It was shot in Ghana.

Pharoah began his television writing career on the BBC soap opera EastEnders in 1991, on which he worked for four years and where he met co-writer Matthew Graham. He went on in 1994–1995 to contribute five episodes to the popular BBC One drama series Casualty and four episodes to Silent Witness (1996).

For ITV he created the long-running series Where the Heart Is, for which he wrote episodes from 1997 to 2000, and created the BBC One TV programme Down to Earth in 2001. Among other work in the early 2000s he scripted an adaptation of Tom Brown's Schooldays, starring Stephen Fry, for ITV in 2005.

Meanwhile, Pharoah, Matthew Graham and veteran Eastenders writer Tony Jordan spent years co-creating Life on Mars, which was first shown in 2006, and Pharoah contributed episodes to both series of the show. Other work around this time included creating the series Wild at Heart (2006–2012) for Company Pictures and adapting Under the Greenwood Tree for Ecosse Films.

In 2006, he formed Monastic Productions with Matthew Graham. Monastic Productions is involved in the Life on Mars spin-off Ashes to Ashes and co-produced Bonekickers, a six-part drama series about archaeology, set in Bath, Somerset. Both series are productions for BBC One. He has won two International Emmys for Life on Mars, a series which was remade for ABC in America, starring Harvey Keitel.

In 2010, Pharoah adapted Case Histories, the novel by Kate Atkinson, for the BBC. It stars Jason Isaacs and was a co-production between Monastic Productions and Ruby Television. Other work around this time include "Eternal Law" for ITV and an adaptation of Moonfleet for Sky, starring Ray Winstone. His series The Living and the Dead, starring Colin Morgan, was screened on BBC1 in the summer of 2016.

Pharaoh was co-creator, writer and executive producer on an adaptation of Jules Verne's Around the World in 80 Days, which starred David Tennant and was screened around the world in 2021.

In 2025, Pharaoh wrote his first work for the stage, Exe Men, the story of the rise of Exeter Chiefs and their European success, based on Rob Kitson's book of the same name. The play premiered at Exeter's Northcott Theatre and received four stars out of five from The Guardian's Mark Lawson.

== Accolades ==
In February 2011, Pharoah was made an Honorary Fellow of the National Film and Television School; this is awarded "in recognition of outstanding contribution to the British film and television industry".

In a ceremony at Bath Abbey in 2016, Pharoah was made a Doctor of Letters by Bath Spa University for his contribution to screenwriting and television production.

He was awarded the Hamilton Deane Award by the Dracula Society for The Living and the Dead in 2016.

== Writing credits ==
Production	Notes	Broadcaster
White Elephant	Feature film (co-written with Werner Grusch, 1984)	N/A
Water's Edge	Short film (1988)	BBC2
EastEnders	25 episodes (1991–1994)	BBC1
Casualty	"Crossing the Line" (1994); "Only the Lonely" (1994); "Not Waving But Drowning" (1995); "Outside Bulawayo" (1995); "Lost Boys" (1995)	BBC1
Silent Witness	"Long Days, Short Nights" (1996); "Darkness Visible" (1996)	BBC1
Where the Heart Is	11 episodes" (co-written with Vicky Featherstone, 1997–2000)	ITV
City Central	"Only Love Can Break Your Heart" (1998)	BBC1
Life Support	"Trust" (1999); "The Price of Love" (1999); "Playing God" (1999); "Soul and Conscience" (1999); "The Undiscovered Country" (1999)	BBC1
Down to Earth	13 episodes (2000–2001)	BBC1
Anchor Me	Television film (2000)	ITV
Paradise Heights	6 episodes (2002)	BBC1
The Eustace Bros.	6 episodes (2003)	BBC1
Hustle	"A Touch of Class" (2004)	BBC1
Tom Brown's Schooldays	Television film (2005)	ITV
Under the Greenwood Tree	Television film (2005)	ITV
Wild at Heart	20 episodes (2006–2012)	ITV
Life on Mars	16 episodes (co-written with Matthew Graham, 2006–2007)	BBC1
Bonekickers	6 episodes (co-written with Matthew Graham, 2008)	BBC1
Ashes to Ashes	24 episodes (co-written with Matthew Graham, 2008–2010)	BBC1
Case Histories	"Case Histories, Part 1" (2011); "Case Histories, Part 2" (2011)	BBC1
Eternal Law	6 episodes (co-written with Matthew Graham, 2012)	ITV
Moonfleet	Television miniseries (2013)	Sky One
The Living and the Dead	6 episodes (2016)	BBC1
Around the World in 80 Days	Co-creator, showrunner (2021-present)	BBC1
Journey to the Center of the Earth	Television miniseries (TBA)	BBC1
Exe Men	Stage play	Northcott Theatre, Exeter

== Awards and nominations ==
Year	Award	Work	Category	Result	Reference
1989	Gold Hugo	Water's Edge	Best Short Film (with Suri Krishnamma)	Nominated	
2006	TV Quick Awards	Life on Mars	Best New Drama (with Matthew Graham and Tony Jordan)	Nominated	
2007	Broadcasting Press Guild Awards	Life on Mars	Writer's Award (with Matthew Graham and Tony Jordan)	Won	
2007	TV Quick Awards	Life on Mars	Best Loved Drama (with Matthew Graham and Tony Jordan)	Nominated	
2007	Edgar Allan Poe Awards	Life on Mars: "Episode 1"	Best Television Episode Teleplay	Won	
2007	Writers' Guild of Great Britain Award	Life on Mars: Series 2	Soap/Series (TV) (with Chris Chibnall, Mark Greig, Matthew Graham, Guy Jenkin, Tony Jordan and Julie Rutterford)	Nominated	
2008	Cinéma Tous Ecrans	Ashes to Ashes	Audience Award for Best International Television Series (with Matthew Graham)	Won	
2008	Writers' Guild of Great Britain Award	Ashes to Ashes	Television Drama Series (with Matthew Graham, Mark Greig, Julie Rutterford and Mick Ford)	Nominated	
2010	TRIC Awards	Ashes to Ashes	TV Crime Programme (with Matthew Graham and Tony Jordan)	Nominated	
2010	TV Quick Awards	Ashes to Ashes	Best Drama Series (with Matthew Graham)	Won	
2010	Writers' Guild of Great Britain Award	Ashes to Ashes	Television Drama Series (with Matthew Graham, Julie Rutterford, Tom Butterworth, Chris Hurford, Jack Lothian and James Payne)	Nominated	
2011	TRIC Awards	Ashes to Ashes	TV Drama Programme of the Year (with Matthew Graham)	Nominated	

Preceded by Jonathan Ross, OBE	NFTS Honorary Fellowship; 2011	Succeeded by Incumbent
