= Deon Stewardson =

British-South African actor (1951–2017)

- Born: 11 October 1951; South Africa
- Died: 27 October 2017 (aged 66); South Africa
- Occupation: Actor
- Years active: 1981–2017
- Known for: Wild at Heart (2006–2012)
- Parent: Joe Stewardson
- Relatives: Matthew Stewardson (brother)

Deon Stewardson (11 October 1951 – 27 October 2017) was a British-South African actor best known for his role as Anders "Dup" Du Plessis in the ITV Drama series Wild at Heart. As well as this role, he took a number of minor roles in many different genres, including The Foster Gang. Stewardson has also starred in films, most notably Lethal Woman.

Deon was the son of South African actor Joe Stewardson and elder brother of Matthew Stewardson who appeared in Idols South Africa (season 1)

== Death ==
On the morning of 28 October 2017, a local outlet reported Stewardson had been found dead in the bathroom at a Graaff-Reinet accommodation establishment the previous afternoon, with police confirming it as suicide. Stewardson is survived by his partner Marianne Meijer, sister Sheryl and half siblings Joanne and Sean. By his request, there was no funeral, and his family and friends arranged a 'get-together' to remember him on the day of his direct cremation. Stewardson never married or had children and regretted not doing so.

== Selected filmography ==
Year	Series	Role	Notes
1981	Kill and Kill Again	Gas Station Attendant	
1988	Blood Ransom	Claude Belmondo	
1988	City Wolf	Pogrund	
1988	Lethal Woman	John Sales	
1988	Rhino	Brad Cannon	
1989	Death Force	Tony the Groom	
1989	Easy Kill	Speedo	
1989	Enemy Unseen	Stanley	
1989	Merchants at War	TV Newsman	
1990	America Ninja 4: The Annihilation	Delta Force Team	
1990	Deathstalker and the Warriors from Hell	Matt Butler	
1990	Easy Kill	Speedo	
1990	The Final Alliance	Meadows	
1990	Impact	Drunk Driver	
1990	Return to Justice	Insanity Boy	
1990	Voice in the Dark	Barney Loomis	
1991	American Kickboxer	Jim, Sports Editor	
1991	Committed	Alex Walper	
1993	Friends	Police Chief	TV Series - 1 episode
1993	Tropical Heat	Dewey	
1995	Cyborg Cop III	Pool Hall Barman	
1996	Rhodes	Australian Digger	TV Series - 1 episode
1997	Tarzan: The Epic Adventures	Skip	TV Series - 1 episode
1997	Merchant of Death	Harv Bennett	
1997	The Place of Lions	Repoman	
1999	Heel Against the Head	Cowboy	
2001	Malunde	Gary	
2001	The Foster Gang	William Foster	TV Movie
2006	Coup!	Mercenary	TV Movie
2006–2012	Wild at Heart	Anders Du Plessis	TV Series - 66 episodes
