= EP (disambiguation) =

An extended play (EP) is a musical recording that contains more than a single, but less than a full album

EP, ep, or Ep may also refer to:

== Arts and entertainment ==
=== Music ===
- Electric piano
- Entity Paradigm, a Pakistani rock band
- EP (The 77s EP), 1999
- EP (Beth Ditto EP), 2011
- EP (Childish Gambino EP), 2011
- EP (Crystal Antlers EP), 2008
- EP (The Fiery Furnaces album), 2005
- EP (The Format EP), 2002
- EP (Luna EP), 1996
- EP (Matchbox Twenty EP), 2003
- EP (Mogwai EP), 1999
- (The EP), an EP by Owen, 2004
- The EP (3for3 EP), 2015
- The EP (Frank n Dank album), 2007
- E.P., an EP by Alkaline Trio, 2020
- EP, an EP by Hope & Social, 2008
- EP, an EP by Red Flag, 1996

=== Other uses in arts and entertainment ===
- EP Daily, an entertainment-media news TV show
- Episode, sometimes abbreviated as Ep or ep
- Executive producer, a non-technical producer of an entertainment production

== Businesses and organisations ==
=== Government and politics ===
- English Partnerships, a former English urban regeneration agency
- Estradas de Portugal, a Portuguese roads agency
- European Parliament, the European Union's directly elected assembly

=== Other businesses and organizations ===
- Editorial Photographers, a member of Imagery Alliance
- El Paso Corp. (NYSE stock symbol), a US natural gas producer
- Iran Aseman Airlines (IATA code)
- Enchanted Parks, an American theme park operator
- Europa Press (news agency), a news agency
- Euromaidan Press, a Ukrainian news website

== Places ==
- Eden Prairie, Minnesota, US
- El Paso, Texas, US
- Ep, Kentucky, US
- Edgeley Park, Stockport, UK
- East Providence, Rhode Island, US

== Science, technology, and mathematics ==
=== Biology and medicine ===
- Ectopic pregnancy
- Electrophysiology, the study of the electrical properties of biological cells and tissues
- Erythropoietin, a hormone
- Evoked potential, a stimulation induced electrophysiological test
- Etoposide and platinum agent (cisplatin), a chemotherapy regimen

=== Transportation ===
- Extreme pressure additive, a lubricant additive
- Estimated position, a navigation term
- Electric locomotive (Polish train designation: EP)
- English Premium brake, an abbreviation for the electro-pneumatic brake system on British railway trains
- Iran (aircraft registration prefix EP)

=== Other uses in science, technology, and mathematics ===
- Electrically powered spacecraft propulsion
- EPDM rubber, a synthetic ethylene-propylene-based rubber
- Equivalent person, a concept used in sanitary engineering (also called population equivalent)
- Expectation propagation, a technique in Bayesian machine learning
- Potential energy (E_{p})

== Other uses ==
- En passant (e.p.), a chess move
- Europa-Park, a theme park in Germany
- Environmental Professional, as provided by ECO Canada
- Ecumenical Patriarchate of Constantinople, an Eastern Orthodox Christian Church headquartered in Istanbul
- Executive protection
- "Ep", an abbreviation of the Greek letter Epsilon, especially in the name of a fraternity or sorority

== See also ==
- Extended play (disambiguation)
- EP1 (disambiguation)
- EP2 (disambiguation)
- EP3 (disambiguation)
