= Episode 1 (The Casual Vacancy) =

- The Casual Vacancy episode
- Episode no.: Episode 1
- Directed by: Jonny Campbell
- Written by: Sarah Phelps
- Cinematography by: Tony Slater
- Editing by: Tom Hemmings
- Original air date: 15 February 2015
- Running time: 60 minutes

Episode chronology
← Previous —	Next → "Episode 2"

"Episode 1" is the first episode of British miniseries The Casual Vacancy based on the novel of the same title by J. K. Rowling.

== Plot ==
The village of Pagford is left in shock when a local resident dies suddenly. Pagford is seemingly an English idyll, but what lies behind the acade is a community at war. The empty seat left on the parish council soon becomes the catalyst for the biggest battle the village has yet seen.

== Reception ==
Upon airing on BBC One the episode received 6.6 million overnight viewers equating to a 27.5% share of the total television audience.

The episode received positive reviews from critics. Cameron K McEwan of Digital Spy said that it was "a cracking first instalment... [with the episode bounding] between morality and message, beauty and reality, in a picturesque postcard style that engages the heart and mind with a perfect cast and biting script." Ellen E Jones of The Independent the episode, and commended the episode, and noted that it did "better than either Broadchurch or Fortitude at wrangling a large ensemble into a coherent story." She also praised the ensemble cast, in particular Abigail Lawrie, and the director of the episode Jonny Campbell. Stuart Jeffries of The Guardian also had praise for Lawrie who played "Krystal as hard as nails and as brittle as pressed flowers." Overall he called the opening instalment of the miniseries "nicely done".

Gerard O'Donovan of The Telegraph gave the episode 4 out of 5 stars, despite some reservations about the digressions, saying:

As in the book, depressing digressions into the unhappy lives of Pagford’s ready supply of alienated and put-upon teenagers feels like a distraction from the main purpose. Even so, the performances are uniformly good, the direction is inventive, and there’s an undeniable topicality and panache to this adaptation that convinces you that just around the corner something will pull it all together and make it succeed.

Grace Dent of The Independent postulated that "it was odd to read reports that the show was attacking the middle classes and glorifying 'the noble savage'. It was glaringly clear, to me at least, from Phelps' script that while Michael Gambon’s character Howard Mollison was indeed a terrible snob, we could hardly disagree that the 'feral' kids wiping bogeys down his deli window were spoiling village ambience. These were difficult notions of 'village life' – the junkies, the domestic abusers, the shark-like property developers, the upwardly mobiles, [and] the downwardly spiralling". She summarised that "It must be quite exhausting to feel... lost in a righteous lather over how closet communists [at the BBC] are frittering away your 40p a day."
