= Episode 2 (The Casual Vacancy) =

- The Casual Vacancy episode
- Episode no.: Episode 2
- Directed by: Jonny Campbell
- Written by: Sarah Phelps
- Cinematography by: Tony Slater
- Editing by: Tom Hemmings
- Original air date: 22 February 2015
- Running time: 60 minutes

Episode chronology
← Previous "Episode 1"	Next → "Episode 3"

"Episode 2" is the second episode of the British miniseries The Casual Vacancy based on the novel of the same title by J. K. Rowling.

== Synopsis ==
The parish council election approaches and Pagford is on tenterhooks awaiting the next post from 'the Ghost of Barry Fairbrother'. Who is the Ghost, and what will they say? Is anyone in the village safe from humiliation? As tensions rise, the finger of suspicion points in many directions.

== Reception ==
The episode received mixed-to-positive reviews from critics. Cameron K McEwan of Digital Spy gave the episode a mixed review. Despite this, he praised the cast, in particular Abigail Lawrie, Rory Kinnear and Rufus Jones

Ceri Radford of The Telegraph gave the episode 4 out of 5 stars, despite some reservations about the digressions, saying:

The drama trod delicately between tragedy and comedy, while its direction gave an aesthetic consistency sometimes lacking in the original novel. In one of many clever tweaks, the action has shifted from Rowling’s winter of discontent to a ripe, rotten summer, with sun-soaked colours bleaching into sepia.
