= Episode 2 =

Episode 2, Episode II or Episode Two may refer to:

== Books ==
- Star Wars: Episode II – Attack of the Clones (novel), 2002 novel

== Film ==
- Star Wars: Episode II – Attack of the Clones, a 2002 film

== Music ==
- Episode II (album), a 2001 album by Safri Duo
- Episode II (EP), a 2000 EP by Eiffel 65
- Episode 2: Medecine Cake, a 2002 album by Pleymo
- "Episode 2" (song), a song by Dragon Ash
- Star Wars: Episode II – Attack of the Clones (soundtrack), a 2002 soundtrack

== Television episodes ==
- "Episode 2" (All of Us Are Dead)
- "Episode 2" (Ashes to Ashes series 1)
- "Episode 2" (Humans series 1)
- "Episode 2" (The Casual Vacancy)
- "Episode 2" (Twin Peaks)
- "Episode 2" (Uyanış: Büyük Selçuklu)
- "Episode Two" (Dark Matter)
- "Imaginationland Episode II", a South Park episode
- "Robot Chicken: Star Wars Episode II", a Robot Chicken episode
- "Episode Two: Election Blu-Galoo", a Clone High episode
- "Second Episode", of The New Pope

== Video games ==
- Coffee Talk Episode 2: Hibiscus & Butterfly, a 2023 game
- Half-Life 2: Episode Two, a 2007 game
- Math Blaster Episode II: Secret of the Lost City, a 1994 game
- Monster Rancher Battle Card Episode II, a 2000 game
- Star Wars: Episode II – Attack of the Clones (video game), a 2002 game
- Sonic the Hedgehog 4: Episode II, a 2012 game
- Xenosaga Episode II, a 2004 game

== See also ==
- Episode 1 (disambiguation)
- Episode 3 (disambiguation)
