= Episode 3 (The Casual Vacancy) =

- The Casual Vacancy episode
- Episode no.: Episode 3
- Directed by: Jonny Campbell
- Written by: Sarah Phelps
- Cinematography by: Tony Slater
- Editing by: Tom Hemmings
- Original air date: 1 March 2015
- Running time: 60 minutes

Episode chronology
← Previous "Episode 2"	Next → —

"Episode 3" is the third and final episode of the British miniseries The Casual Vacancy based on the novel of the same title by J. K. Rowling.

== Synopsis ==
With the parish council election imminent, tensions rise in Pagford as each side steps up their campaign. Who will triumph in an election fraught with passion, duplicity and unexpected revelations? The battle lines are drawn, and the fate of Sweetlove House hangs in the balance.

== Reception ==
The episode received positive reviews from critics. Michael Hogan of The Telegraph gave the episode 3 out of 5 stars, despite some reservations about the digressions, saying:

Beautifully shot and gorgeously soundtracked, it did get a happy coda of sorts, as the flames of young love flickered into life, while Miles grew a backbone and was reunited with wife Samantha (the brilliantly brittle Keeley Hawes). Bittersweet but bravo.
