= EP1 =

EP1 or EP 1 may refer to:

== Music ==
- EP 1 (Crosses EP), 2011
- EP1 (dollys EP), 2013
- EP1 (Duke Dumont EP), 2014
- EP1 (FKA Twigs EP), 2012
- EP1 (Kleptones EP), 2006
- EP 1 (Odd Year and the Reverb Junkie EP), 2012
- EP1 (Pixies EP), 2013
- EP 1 (Qveen Herby EP), 2017
- EP1 (Smoke & Jackal EP), 2012
- EP 1 (Zero 7 EP), 2000
- EP001, an EP by Thenewno2, 2006
- EP 1, an EP by Basement Jaxx, 1994
- EP1, an EP by Viktoria Modesta, 2010

== Science ==
- Prostaglandin EP_{1} receptor, a human gene
- EP1 procyclin, a trypanosome procyclin protein

== Transport ==
- EP1 (electric locomotive), a Russian locomotive
- New Haven EP-1, an electric locomotive built for the New York, New Haven and Hartford Railroad, 1905–1908

== See also ==
- Episode I (disambiguation), the first release of any series
- EpOne, a 2000 EP by Hundred Reasons
