= EP3 =

EP3 may refer to:

== Music ==
- EP3 (Basement Jaxx EP)
- EP3 (Kleptones EP)
- EP3 (Pixies EP)
- EP3 (Ringo Starr EP)

== Photography ==
- Olympus PEN E-P3, a digital camera

== Science ==
- Procyclin EP3, a trypanosome procyclin protein
- Prostaglandin EP_{3} receptor

== Transportation ==
- Lockheed EP-3, an electronic surveillance turboprop aircraft
- Milwaukee Road class EP-3, a U.S. electric locomotive used by the railway operator Milwaukee Road 1919-1957
- PKP class EP03, a Swedish electric locomotive used by the Polish railway operator PKP
- EP3, the chassis code for the 2001-2005 Civic Si and Type R; see Honda Civic (seventh generation)

== See also ==
- Episode 3 (disambiguation)
- III (Orbital EP)
