= Extended play (disambiguation) =

An extended play (EP) is an audio recording longer than a single, but shorter than an album.

Extended Play may also refer to:

- Xplay, a television show on G4, formerly known as Extended Play
- Extended Play (film), a 1982 short film
- An SLP videocassette recording mode; see VHS tape lengths
- The EP mode on DVD video recorders; see DVD recorder

== Music ==
- Extended Play (Austin Mahone EP), 2013
- Extended Play (Cabaret Voltaire EP), 1978
- Extended Play (Denver Harbor EP), 2003
- Extended Play (Dive EP), 1994
- Extended Play (E.g Oblique Graph EP), 1982
- Extended Play (Fleetwood Mac EP), 2013
- Extended Play (Gin Wigmore EP), 2008
- Extended Play (Ladytron EP), 2006
- Extended Play: Live at Birdland, 2003 live double-album by the Dave Holland Quintet
- Extended Play (Mi-Sex EP), 2016
- Extended Play (Pretenders EP), 1981
- Extended Play, a 1994 EP by The Raincoats
- Extended Play (Statik Selektah album), 2013
- Extended Play, a 2016 EP by LANCO
- Extended Play and Extended Play Two, a pair of EPs released in 2000 by Broadcast
- The Extended Play E.P., a 2011 album by T.J. Miller

== See also ==
- EP, for EPs named simply "EP"
