= Episode 0 =

Episode 0 or Episode Zero may refer to:

== Film and television ==
- Episode 0: The First Contact, a 2002 television special
- Ichi the Killer: Episode 0, a 2002 original video animation
- Girls in Trouble: Space Squad Episode Zero, a 2017 film
- Mashin Sentai Kiramager Episode Zero, a 2020 film
- Karmachakra, an Indian animated film also known as Karmachakra: Episode Zero
- Strong World: Episode 0, a 2009 original video animation based on the television series One Piece
- Un-Go Episode 0: Inga Chapter, a 2011 film based on the television series Un-Go

== Other media ==
- "Episode.0", a 2011 song by Gackt
- Mobile Suit Gundam Wing: Episode Zero, a 1997 manga series
- Sakura Wars V Episode 0, a 2004 video game
- Ultraseven Episode: 0, a 2002 novel based on the series Heisei Ultraseven
- White Knight Chronicles Episode 0: Dogma War Chronicles, a 2008 manga based on the video game White Knight Chronicles

== See also ==
- Episode 1 (disambiguation)
