= Episode 3 =

Episode Three, Episode 3 or Episode III may refer to:

== Books ==
- Star Wars: Episode III – Revenge of the Sith (novel), a 2005 novel

== Film ==
- Star Wars: Episode III – Revenge of the Sith, a 2005 film

== Music ==
- Star Wars: Episode III – Revenge of the Sith (soundtrack), a 2005 soundtrack
- "Episode #3", a song by The Boomtown Rats from The Fine Art of Surfacing

== Television episodes ==
- "Episode 3" (The Casual Vacancy)
- "Episode 3" (Humans series 1)
- "Episode 3" (Twin Peaks)
- "Imaginationland Episode III", a South Park episode
- "Robot Chicken: Star Wars Episode III", a Robot Chicken episode
- "Third Episode" (The New Pope)

== Video games ==
- Another Century's Episode 3: The Final, 2007 game
- Half-Life 2: Episode Three, a canceled video game
- Phantasy Star Online Episode III: C.A.R.D. Revolution, a 2003 game
- Star Wars: Episode III – Revenge of the Sith (video game), a 2005 game
- Warrior Blade: Rastan Saga Episode III, a 1991 game
- Xenosaga Episode III, 2006 video game

== See also ==
- Episode 2 (disambiguation)
- Episode 4 (disambiguation)
