= EP2 =

EP2, EP-2 or EP 2 may refer to:

== Music ==
- EP2 (FKA Twigs EP), 2013
- EP2 (The Kleptones EP), 2006
- EP2 (Pixies EP), 2014
- EP2 (Yaeji EP), 2017
- EP 2 (Basement Jaxx EP), 1995
- EP 2 (Crosses EP), 2012
- EP 2 (Odd Year & The Reverb Junkie EP), 2014
- EP 2 (Qveen Herby EP), 2017
- EP 2 (Zero 7 EP), 2000
- EP2! (JPEGMafia EP). 2021
- EP2 (Body Type EP), 2019

== Other uses ==
- Milwaukee Road class EP-2, a locomotive
- Olympus PEN E-P2, a camera
- PKP class EP02, a Polish electric locomotive used by the Polish railway operator PKP
- Prostaglandin E2 receptor
- EP2, a chemical process used to develop color photographs in the 1980s and 1990s
- EP2 procyclin, a trypanosome procyclin protein
- ep2, a swiss and european payment standard in EFT POS payment

== See also ==
- Episode II (disambiguation)
