= Modern Dance for Beginners =

- Original language: English
- Written by: Sarah Phelps
- Characters: Eleri; Frances; Julia; Kieran; Lorraine; Owen; Russell; Skinner
- Subject: Love and sex
- Genre: Dramedy
- Setting: A hotel bedroom, a large country house, Frances' living room, an anonymous room and a bar. The action takesplaceover the course of a year.

Premiere
- Date: 15 June 2001
- Place: Finborough Theatre, London
- Official website

Modern Dance for Beginners is a play for two people written by British playwright Sarah Phelps.

== Synopsis ==
The action of the play takes place over the course of a year and is set in the present, the very recent past and variable futures. All the characters are played by the same actor and actress with changes of costume taking place on stage in between scenes, each character helping to dress and undress the other.

In the opening scene we meet Frances, a bridesmaid and Owen the bridegroom. They are in a hotel room on a late summer afternoon, having just left the wedding reception for a while. During the course of the scene a very drunk Frances complains to Owen about his wedding and ends up twisting him round her finger. The scene ends with Owen beginning to undress and Frances removing his wedding band.

The second scene is set in the winter after the wedding in the kitchen of a large country house. Kieran, a handy man is fixing a leak whilst Julia is finishing an argument with her sister-in-law on the phone. In her rage having ended the phone call, Julia tells Kieran she wants a five-hundred-year-old wall in her listed house ripped down and then leans on the wall, forcing Kieran up against her, kissing him fiercely. She tells him to punish her and he declines, saying he is not a machine and doesn't see the sense in "all this urgency". Having calmed Julia down, he suggest that she does something "erotic" whilst he watches on from a distance. Julia declines and begins to explain that she is not satisfied with her husband. Kieran interrupts by swiftly walking over to Julia and putting his hand roughly up her skirt, lifting her onto her toes. Having done this he walks away from her. Julia tells Kieran he's only a handy-man, trying to assert authority but Kieran simply replies with "Yeah, aren't I just. All those little jobs around the house." There is a brief pause and Julia says "Don't make me beg. Don't make me beg you. Please." to which Kieran simply replies: That's more like it."

The scene changes to a spring night in Frances' living room. Frances (wearing a gold ring on a chain around her neck) is having sex with Russell, a failing media publishing executive, in an uncomfortable position. As they are having sex, Russell sees an image of Skinner in his mind. He stops. He explains that it is a recurring nightmare-ish vision he has and goes on to explain a bit about his childhood to Frances. After a while, he looks at the ring around Frances' neck. Frances takes it away from Russell and conceals it down her top. Russell begins to declare his undying love for Frances. After Frances telling him to stop thinking like that they agree they don't really want to have sex with each other at that moment.

The fourth scene is set early morning in an anonymous room. Owen is getting changed having just spent the night sleeping with Eleri. He is desperately trying to leave without seeming like he has just used Eleri as a one-night stand. Eleri says nothing whilst he drones on until the end of the scene when she says "I found a lump." This only makes Owen stammer his way through another speech telling Eleri she should call a friend and that it's terrible news. Eleri interrupts and says: "On you." Silently, Eleri unzips Owen's trousers, puts her hand inside and feels. She takes Owen's hand and guides it to the spot. Owen feels what she has felt and Eleri moves away. Owen re-zips his trousers and simply says "Sorry."

The scene changes to an autumn night in a bar. Lorraine, a consultant oncologist is sat reading a book with a drink as the aforementioned Skinner approaches with a drink. Skinner begins to attempt to pick up Lorraine. After a while Skinner says the classic line: "Do you come here often" and Lorraine stops the conversation. It becomes apparent that Skinner has been through this conversation with Lorraine several times before, trying out various lines on her for practice. Skinner leaves and returns. This time, instead of Skinner striking up conversation, Lorraine says "Hi." Skinner is still. He then kisses Lorraine, tenderly and deeply for some time. They move apart. Lorraine simply says "I'll get my coat".

The final scene is in the same hotel bedroom as Scene 1, although it is half an hour later. Frances is sat on the bed, half-dressed in her bridesmaid dress. The sound of running water is heard offstage and Owen enters. The phone is ringing and Owen answers. As he put it down, he begins to get a guilty conscience and thinks that the other members of the party who rang may have worked out he had left to have sex with Frances. Frances tells him to stop being so paranoid. A small argument ensues and Owen goes to leave. He brushes the hair out of Frances eyes and she catches his hand, holding it against her face. Owen asks "What will you do?" to which Frances replies "Carry on. Keep going." Owen goes to leave again and realises he doesn't have the ring on his finger. Frances picks it up from the side and Owen walks towards her. She puts the ring in her mouth and lifts the champagne from the mini-bar. She drinks and swallows. Owen says he'll think of something to explain the ring's disappearance and turns to go. As he leaves Frances says: "You'll miss me." to which Owen replies: "I know."

== Characters ==
- Frances (31) - a bridesmaid and later a company strategist
- Owen (33) - a bridegroom and later a too-ardent lover
- Julia (32) - a spoiled daughter and betrayed wife
- Kieran (29) - a handy-man and jack-of-all-trades
- Russell (36) - a failing media executive and terminal romantic
- Eleri (22) - an assistant sports shop manager
- Skinner (44) - a corporate reptile
- Lorraine (39) - a mother and oncologist

== Productions ==
=== Original Production ===
The original production was performed as part of the Rose Bruford College Director's Showcase at the Finborough Theatre, London on 15 and 16 June 2001. The production was directed by Elizabeth Freestone and featured the following cast:

- Owen, Kieran, Russell, Skinner - Daniel Tomlinson
- Frances, Julia, Eleri, Lorraine - Nicola Walker

The production was designed by Penny Tulla and the lighting designer was Suzy Hallam.

The play was subsequently staged by the Soho Theatre Company at the Soho Theatre, London and ran from 23 September to 9 October 2002. The production was directed by Jonathan Lloyd and featured the following cast change:

- Owen, Kieran, Russell, Skinner – Justin Salinger

The production was designed by Soutra Gilmour, with lighting design by Johanna Town and sound design by Matt McKenzie.
