= Episode 1 =

Episode One, Episode 1 or Episode I may refer to:

== Books ==
- Star Wars: Episode I – The Phantom Menace (novel), a 1999 novel
- Star Wars Episode I Journal (book series), a 1999 book series

== Film ==
- Black & White Episode I: The Dawn of Assault, a 2012 film
- Case Closed Episode One, a 2016 film
- Star Wars: Episode I – The Phantom Menace, a 1999 film
- Vader Episode I: Shards of the Past, a 2018 film

== Music ==
- Episode 1 (EP), a 2013 extended play by Broiler
- Episode 001: Chasing Hayley, a 2009 EP by Kidz in Space
- Episode One: Children of Harlem, a 1994 album by Gary Bartz
- Star Wars: Episode I – The Phantom Menace (soundtrack), a 1999 soundtrack

== Television episodes ==
- "Episode 1" (Ashes to Ashes series 1)
- "Episode 1" (Baby Reindeer)
- "Episode 1" (Being Human series 1)
- "Episode 1" (Coronation Street)
- "Episode 1" (Fleabag series 2)
- "Episode 1" (Humans series 1)
- "Episode 1" (Shortland Street)
- "Episode 1" (The Casual Vacancy)
- "Episode 1" (Tá no Ar)
- "Episode 1" (Twin Peaks)
- "Episode 1" (Uyanış: Büyük Selçuklu)
- "Episode 1.1" (Secret Diary of a Call Girl)
- "Imaginationland Episode I", a South Park episode

== Video games ==
- Half-Life 2: Episode One, a 2006 game
- Lethe – Episode One, a 2016 game
- Math Blaster Episode I: In Search of Spot, a 1993 game
- Star Wars Episode I: Battle for Naboo, a 2000 game
- Star Wars Episode I: The Gungan Frontier, a 1999 game
- Star Wars Episode I: Jedi Power Battles, a 2000 game
- Star Wars Episode I: Obi-Wan's Adventures, a 2000 game
- Star Wars: Episode I – The Phantom Menace (video game), a 1999 game
- Star Wars Episode I: Racer, a 1999 game
- Sonic the Hedgehog 4: Episode I, a 2010 game
- Xenosaga Episode I, a 2002 game

== Other uses ==
- Episode 1 (company), a UK investment company
- Star Wars Episode I (pinball), a 1999 pinball game

== See also ==
- Series premiere, the first episode of a series
