= The Casual Vacancy (miniseries) =

TV miniseries

- DVD cover
- Genre: Drama
- Based on: The Casual Vacancy by J. K. Rowling
- Written by: Sarah Phelps
- Directed by: Jonny Campbell
- Starring: Monica Dolan; Michael Gambon; Keeley Hawes; Rufus Jones; Rory Kinnear; Simon McBurney; Julia McKenzie; Abigail Lawrie
- Composer: Solomon Grey
- Country of origin: United Kingdom
- Original language: English
- No. of episodes: 3

Production
- Executive producers: Paul Trijbits; Rick Senat; Neil Blair; J. K. Rowling
- Producer: Ruth Kenley-Letts
- Cinematography: Tony Slater Ling
- Editor: Tom Hemmings
- Running time: 182 minutes
- Production companies: Brontë Film and Television

Original release
- Network: BBC One
- Release: 15 February – 1 March 2015

The Casual Vacancy is a 2015 British three-part drama based on the 2012 novel of the same title by J. K. Rowling. Directed by Jonny Campbell and written by Sarah Phelps, the series premiered on 15 February 2015 on BBC One in the United Kingdom and on 29 April 2015 on HBO in the United States.

== Cast ==
- Rory Kinnear as Barry Fairbrother
- Emily Bevan as Mary Fairbrother
- Michael Gambon as Howard Mollison
- Julia McKenzie as Shirley Mollison
- Rufus Jones as Miles Mollison
- Keeley Hawes as Samantha Mollison
- Hetty Baynes as Maureen Lowe
- Abigail Lawrie as Krystal Weedon
- Keeley Forsyth as Terri Weedon
- Simon McBurney as Colin 'Cubby' Wall
- Monica Dolan as Tess Wall
- Brian Vernel as Stuart 'Fats' Wall
- Richard Glover as Simon Price
- Marie Critchley as Ruth Price
- Joe Hurst as Andrew 'Arf' Price
- Michele Austin as Kay Bawden
- Lolita Chakrabarti as Parminder Jawanda
- Silas Carson as Vikram Jawanda
- Ria Choony as Sukhvinder Jawanda
- Simona Brown as Gaia Bawden
- Julian Wadham as Aubrey Sweetlove
- Emilia Fox as Julia Sweetlove

== Production ==
The miniseries was announced on 3 December 2012. It was commissioned from The Blair Partnership who represent J. K. Rowling. The series was produced through an independent production company operated by Neil Blair and Rick Senat (who were executive producers of the series), on behalf of The Blair Partnership. The deal was struck following discussions between Blair and BBC One Controller Danny Cohen. J. K. Rowling was to collaborate closely with the project, with the number and length of the episodes then still to be decided.

On 12 September 2013, Warner Bros. announced that it will serve as the worldwide TV distributor of the series, except in the United Kingdom.

After a year and a half without news on the production itself, casting was announced in June 2014. Filming began in August 2014 in the Gloucestershire towns of Painswick, Bisley, Northleach and Minchinhampton, Dauntsey, and in the city of Bristol and at Archway School.

British band Solomon Grey composed the music for the series, which heavily features tracks from their 2015 album Selected Works, along with original songs.

== Episodes ==
No.	Title	Directed by	Written by	Original release date	UK viewers (millions)
1	"Episode 1"	Jonny Campbell	Sarah Phelps	15 February 2015	8.80
The village of Pagford is left in shock when a local resident dies. Pagford is seemingly an English idyll, but what lies behind the pretty facade is a community at war.
2	"Episode 2"	Jonny Campbell	Sarah Phelps	22 February 2015	6.39
The parish council election approaches and Pagford is on tenterhooks awaiting the next post from 'the Ghost of Barry Fairbrother'.
3	"Episode 3"	Jonny Campbell	Sarah Phelps	1 March 2015	5.95
With the parish council election imminent, tensions rise in Pagford.

== Critical reception ==
The critical response to the opening episode was mostly positive. In a particularly praise-filled review for Digital Spy, Cameron McKewan described the series as having a "perfect cast with a biting script". He summarised: "It's a cracking first instalment for the three-part series with bountiful characters to take in, and the relationships not clearly defined from the outset (rewardingly so)" In a review for The Guardian, Stuart Jeffries also gave a positive response, whilst describing the series as "The Archers meets Benefit Street" Comparing the TV adaptation more positively than the novel itself, Gerard O'Donovan, in a review for The Telegraph, awarded the series opener 4 out of 5 stars. He optimistically summarised: "...the performances are uniformly good, the direction is inventive, and there's an undeniable topicality and panache to this adaptation that convinces you that just around the corner something will pull it all together and make it succeed." Ellen E Jones, writing for The Independent, took a similar approach with review title: "JK Rowling's story is a far better drama than it is a book"

Elsewhere, however, reception to the series opening episode was less favourable. Grace Dent of The Independent said that "it was odd to read reports that the show was attacking the middle classes and glorifying 'the noble savage'. It was glaringly clear, to me at least, from Phelps' script that while Michael Gambon's character Howard Mollison was indeed a terrible snob, we could hardly disagree that the 'feral' kids wiping bogeys down his deli window were spoiling village ambience. These were difficult notions of 'village life' – the junkies, the domestic abusers, the shark-like property developers, the upwardly mobiles, [and] the downwardly spiralling – and I applaud Rowling and Phelps for picking at them."
