= 3for3 =

American Christian pop music band

- Origin: Nashville, Tennessee
- Genre: Christian pop
- Years active: 2015-2017
- Label: Maxx
- Members: Josh Davis; Spencer Lloyd; Benji Shuler
- Website: 3for3music.com

3for3 is an American Christian pop trio from Nashville, Tennessee. They started making music in 2015, with their first extended play, The EP, released by Maxx Recordings. The songs "Halfway" and "Keep It 100" charted on the Billboard magazine charts.

== Background ==
They are a Christian pop trio established in Nashville, Tennessee in 2015. The members are Josh Davis, Spencer Lloyd, and Benji Shuler.

== Music history ==
The trio debuted in 2015 with their first release, an extended play, The EP, released on July 24, 2015 by Maxx Recordings. The singles "Halfway" and "Keep It 100" charted on the Billboard magazine Christian Airplay charts, where they peaked at Nos 40 and 29, correspondingly.

== Members ==
- Josh Davis
- Spencer Lloyd
- Benji Shuler

== Discography ==
EPs

- The EP (July 24, 2015, Maxx)

Singles

Year	Single	Chart Positions
Year	Single	US Chr Airplay
2015	"Halfway"	40
2015	"Keep It 100"	29
