= Smoke & Jackal =

- Origin: Nashville, Tennessee
- Genres: Rock, Southern rock
- Years active: 2012–present
- Labels: RCA
- Spinoff of: Kings of Leon; Mona
- Members: Jared Followill; Nick Brown

Smoke & Jackal is a rock supergroup composed of Kings of Leon bassist Jared Followill and Mona singer and guitarist Nick Brown. On June 22, 2012, Brown posted a photo of Followill and himself on Instagram and tumblr with the caption, "Smoke & Jackal", hinting at a collaboration between the two.

Followill and Brown first recorded as a duo at Brown's home in Nashville, Tennessee, completing the material for their first release within a week. The group's first single, "No Tell", was uploaded to the band's SoundCloud page on August 21, 2012 and was released digitally on August 28, 2012. Their debut EP, EP1, was released on October 16, 2012.

In a press statement, Followill said of recording the debut EP, "Coming together just worked. I think it's because we took such an easy approach to it, we didn't bring any egos to it. We just talked about each other's ideas, neither one of us got our feelings hurt. It just worked."

== Discography ==
- EP1 (2012)
- EP2 Unreleased
