= Star Wars Theory =

YouTube channel

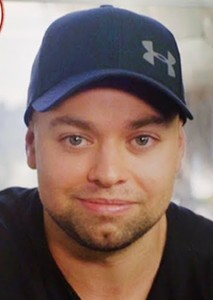
- Star Wars Theory
- Born: Niatoos Dadbeh
- Other name: Toos

YouTube information
- Channel: Star Wars Theory
- Years active: 2016–present
- Genres: Entertainment; Film and TV; Animation
- Subscribers: 3.38 million
- Views: 1.27 billion
- Last updated: September 27, 2026

Niatoos Dadbeh, better known by his YouTube channel, Star Wars Theory, is a Canadian YouTuber with 3.36 million subscribers. Its creator, also known as "Toos", began his YouTube channel in 2016 making videos about the Star Wars film franchise.

== Content ==
The channel originally began with Dadbeh presenting theories regarding the mysteries that were set up by Star Wars: The Force Awakens, with his first video centering around the identity of the character Supreme Leader Snoke. From there, the channel has grown and evolved over the years, with recurring motifs and series such as Star Wars Explained, a narration of many of the Star Wars comics, fan fiction, and many others. One of the features of his channel is to make predictions in Star Wars media.

In 2018, Dadbeh released a live-action fan film titled Vader Episode I: Shards of the Past. A 3D-animated sequel, titled Vader Episode II: Echoes of the Jedi was released in 2026.

== Online response ==
Dadbeh's 2018 fan film Vader Episode I: Shards of the Past has received praise from among the Star Wars fanbase and has been viewed over 30 million times on YouTube as of April 2025.

With over 3 million subscribers on YouTube, he is the most-followed Star Wars-focused content creator on the platform. He has been described as a divisive figure within the online fan community, particularly due to his criticism of Star Wars content released under Disney such as the sequel trilogy and Star Wars: The Acolyte.

In December 2020, private tweets by Lucasfilm Story Group executive Pablo Hidalgo were criticized for allegedly mocking Dadbeh’s emotional YouTube video reaction to the season 2 finale of The Mandalorian. After the tweet became public, Hidalgo apologized and clarified that the tweet was meant to be sarcastic.

In January 2024, Dadbeh interviewed a relationship psychologist who claimed that women do not watch Star Wars and criticized female-focused Star Wars stories. The backlash from the interview shed light on Dadbeh's past strong and sometimes negative opinions surrounding female characters, including his statements that Disney executives had been creating and centering female characters as part of an agenda. In response to the backlash, Dadbeh claimed that the interview was taken out of context and accused the "extreme left" of twisting the words of the interview.
