= The EP (3for3 EP) =

EP by 3for3
- Released: July 24, 2015
- Genre: Christian pop
- Length: 17:07
- Label: Maxx
- Producer: Bernie Herms

The EP is the first EP by 3for3. Maxx Recordings released the EP on July 24, 2015. They worked with producer Bernie Herms.

== Critical reception ==
Professional ratings
Review scores
Source	Rating
365 Days of Inspiring Media	4/5 stars
Jesus Freak Hideout	3/5 stars

Awarding the EP three stars from Jesus Freak Hideout, Sarah Berdon writes, "Though the lyrics are not the deepest and the music does not necessarily stand out from other pop albums, the messages 3for3 presents here go beyond what is normally found in debuts". Joshua Andre, giving the EP four stars at 365 Days of Inspiring Media, states, "With Spencer, Benji and Josh delivering high quality songs and poignant melodies for God, this album is one to be savoured and enjoyed throughout this year and many more to come."

== Track listing ==
Track list
No.	Title	Writer(s)	Length
1.	"Keep It 100"	Josh Davis, Spencer Lloyd, Sam Mizell, Gabe Patillo, Benji Shuler	3:01
2.	"Out of My Head"	Davis, Lloyd, Patillo, Shuler, Dave Wyatt	3:48
3.	"Halfway"	S. Mizell, Emily Weisband, Shuler	3:32
4.	"What if We"	Davis, Ian Eskelin, Lloyd, Shuler, Barry Weeks	3:18
5.	"Counterclockwise"	Davis, Lloyd, Becca Mizell, S. Mizell, Shuler	3:28
Total length:			17:07
