= Extended Play (film) =

- Directed by: David Casci
- Written by: David Casci
- Starring: John Patrick Pierce; Vicki Piper
- Cinematography: John Nystrom
- Release date: 1982
- Running time: 13 minutes
- Country: United States
- Language: English

Extended Play is a 1982 short film written and directed by David Casci. The film was shot at the Sunnyvale Town Center mall.

== Plot ==
Extended Play is about the adventures of a teenager out for a summer day of fun at a shopping mall video game arcade unlike any other.
