= Ep, Kentucky =

Unincorporated community in Kentucky, United States

Ep
- Unincorporated community
- Location within the state of Kentucky Ep (the United States)
- Coordinates: 38°27′54″N 84°50′28″W
- Country: United States
- State: Kentucky
- County: Owen
- Elevation: 866 ft (264 m)
- Time zone: UTC-6 (Central (CST))
  - Summer (DST): UTC-5 (CST)
- GNIS feature ID: 2567366

Ep was an unincorporated community in Owen County, Kentucky, United States.

A post office operated in the community from 1881 to 1903. According to tradition, prominent resident Penelope Sullivan was often called 'Aunt Ep' by children who found her name hard to pronounce.
