= EP1 (Smoke & Jackal EP) =

EP by Smoke & Jackal
- Released: October 16, 2012
- Recorded: 2012 at Brown's home in Nashville, Tennessee
- Genre: Rock; Southern Rock
- Label: RCA

Singles from EP1
- 1. "No Tell" Released: August 28, 2012

Professional ratings
Review scores
Source	Rating
Allmusic	3/5 stars
Consequence of Sound	2.5/5 stars
NME	3/10

EP1 is the debut EP by American rock supergroup Smoke & Jackal, released on October 16, 2012, on RCA Records. Mona singer and guitarist Nick Brown and Kings of Leon bassist Jared Followill recorded the EP within a week at Brown's home in Nashville, Tennessee. They mixed and produced the EP and Brown engineered it. A press statement says recording was "fueled by multiple bottles of red wine and a shared fascination with timbre, rhythm, and aural adventure,” which resulted in an “evocative and original melding of oceanic rock with bottomless grooves and hypnotic dub textures.”

The EP's first single, "No Tell", was uploaded to the band's SoundCloud page on August 21, 2012 and will go on sale digitally on August 28, 2012. BBC Radio 1 DJ Zane Lowe debuted the single on August 22, 2012, calling it the "hottest record in the world." Consequence of Sound wrote of the song, "Kings of Leon’s grandiosity and pomp are in full effect, but Brown’s delicate vocal stylings and the uplifting guitar chug dominate the track."

In a press statement, Followill said, "Coming together just worked. I think it's because we took such an easy approach to it, we didn't bring any egos to it. We just talked about each other's ideas, neither one of us got our feelings hurt. It just worked." In the same press statement, Brown said of the lead single, "It was all about tone and vibe and what felt right in that moment. Not second guessing, just having fun in that moment."

== Track listing ==
No.	Title	Length
1.	"Fall Around"	3:53
2.	"No Tell"	3:36
3.	"You're Lost"	3:53
4.	"Road Side"	3:33
5.	"OK OK"	3:02
6.	"Save Face"	3:54
