= PKP class EP03 =

Polish electric locomotive

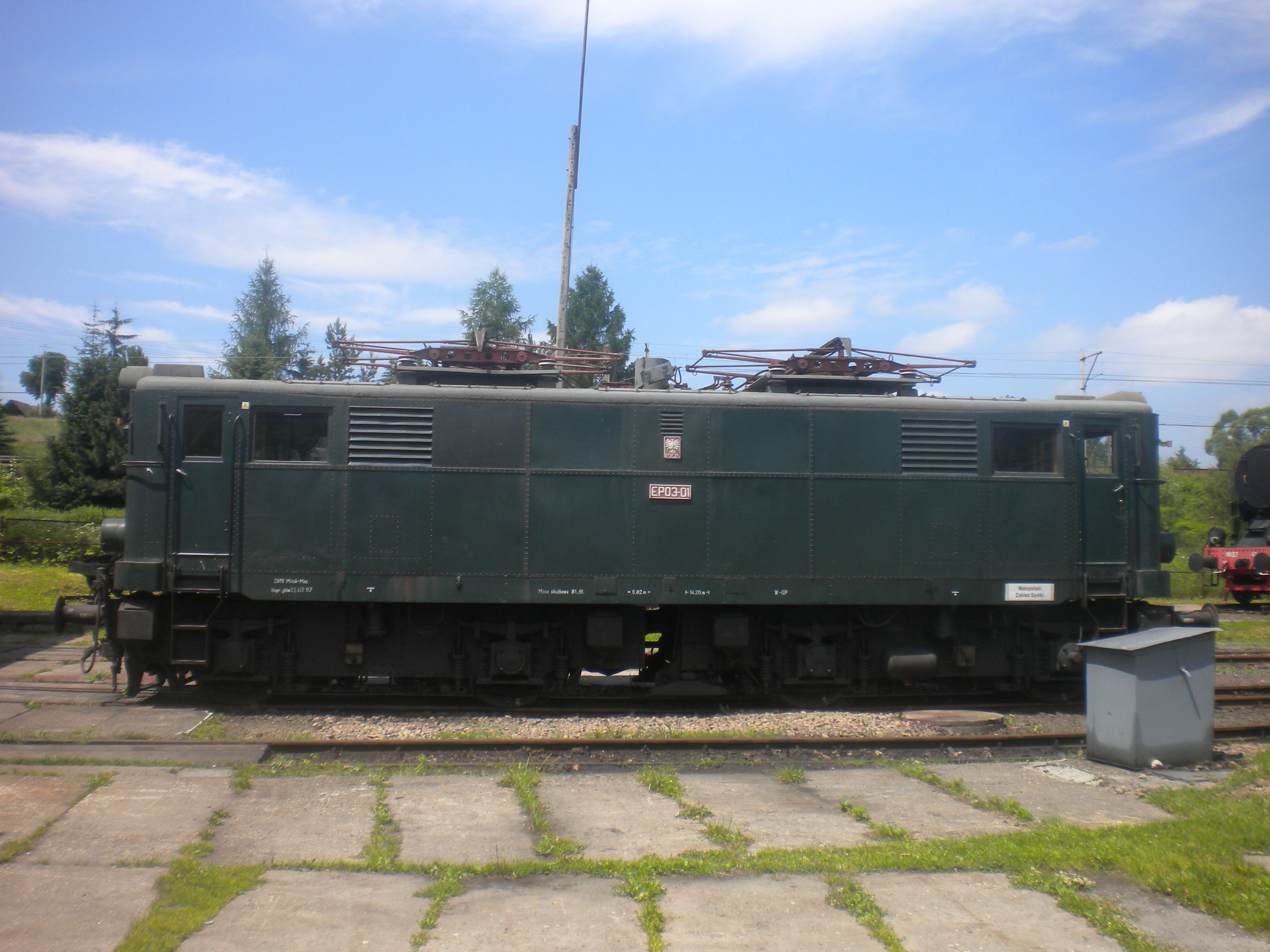
- EP03-01
Type and origin
- Power type: Electric
- Builder: ASEA
- Build date: 1951–1952
- Total produced: 8
Specifications
- Configuration
  - UIC: Bo′Bo′
- Gauge: 1,435 mm (4 ft 8 1/2 in) standard gauge
- Wheel diameter: 1,220 mm (48 in)
- Length: 14,170 mm (46 ft 5 7/8 in)
- Width: 3,150 mm (10 ft 4 in)
- Loco weight: 81.2 t (79.9 long tons; 89.5 short tons)
- Electric system/s: 3,000 V DC Catenary
- Current pickup: Pantograph
- Traction motors: LIB 117, 83:24 gear ratio
Performance figures
- Maximum speed: 100 km/h (62 mph)
- Power output: 1,650 kW (2,210 hp); 1,800 kW (2,400 hp)
Career
- Operators: PKP
- Locale: Poland

The PKP class EP03 (manufacturer's designation: ASEA E150) is a type of electric locomotive used by Polish railway operator Polskie Koleje Państwowe (PKP).

== History ==
In 1946 PKP purchased eight locomotives from the Swedish manufacturer Allmänna Svenska Elektriska Aktiebolaget (ASEA) of a type not used in Sweden.

=== Introduction ===
The locomotives were introduced in 1951–1952. They were designated EP03 class according to PKP system, and numbered EP03-01 to EP03-08. Their main purpose was operating light passenger and freight trains.

== Locomotive assignment ==
Locomotive numbers	Operator	Remarks
01	Sucha Beskidzka	

=== Withdrawal ===
The EP03 locomotives were in service until about 1970; the last of the class was withdrawn in 1974.

=== Present use ===
The only locomotive in operation is EP03-01, preserved in the railway museum in Chabówka.

== See also ==
- Polish locomotives designation
