= The New Pope =

2020 religious drama TV miniseries

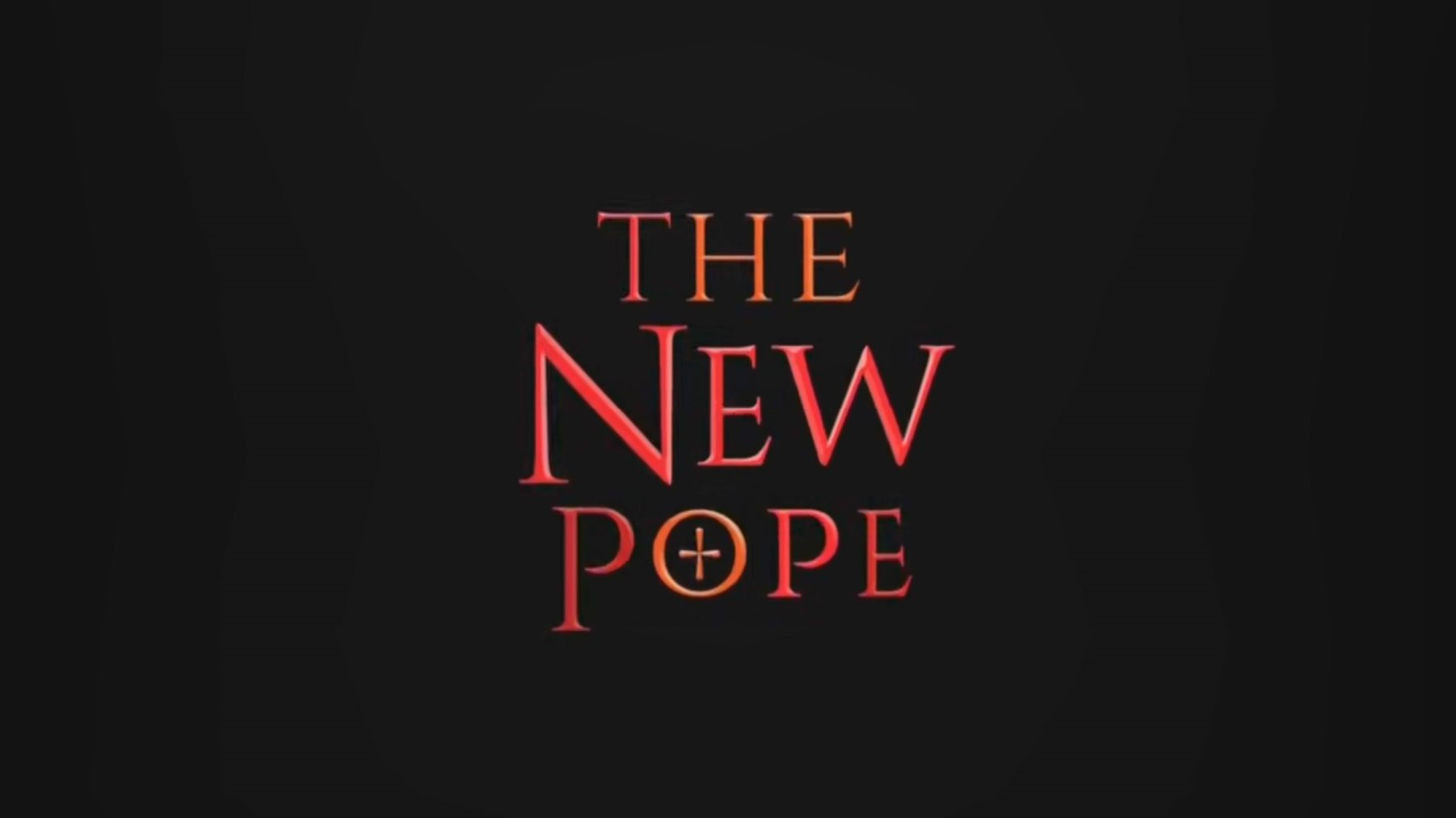
- Genre: Drama
- Created by: Paolo Sorrentino
- Written by: Paolo Sorrentino; Umberto Contarello; Stefano Bises
- Directed by: Paolo Sorrentino
- Starring: Jude Law; John Malkovich; Silvio Orlando; Cécile de France; Javier Cámara; Ludivine Sagnier; Maurizio Lombardi; Marcello Romolo; Mark Ivanir; Henry Goodman; Massimo Ghini; Ulrich Thomsen
- Opening theme: "Good Time Girl" by Sofi Tukker (feat. Charlie Barker) (episodes 1–6); "Watchtower" (Instrumental) prod. by Labrinth (episodes 7–9)
- Composer: Lele Marchitelli
- Countries of origin: Italy; France; Spain
- Original languages: English; Italian
- No. of episodes: 9

Production
- Executive producers: Lorenzo Mieli; Mario Gianani; Riccardo Neri; Elena Recchia; Paolo Sorrentino; Jude Law; Caroline Benjo; Carole Scotta; Simon Arnal; Jaume Roures; Javier Méndez; Nils Hartmann; Sonia Rovai; Davide Bertoni
- Producer: Ben Jackson
- Production locations: Rome; Abruzzo; Venice; United Kingdom
- Cinematography: Luca Bigazzi
- Editor: Cristiano Travaglioli
- Camera setup: Single-camera
- Running time: 47–60 minutes
- Production companies: The Apartment Pictures; Wildside; Haut et Court TV; Mediapro; Sky Studios

Original release
- Network: Sky Atlantic (Italy); HBO (US); Canal+ (France)
- Release: 10 January – 7 February 2020

Related
- The Young Pope

The New Pope is a satirical drama television series created and directed by Paolo Sorrentino for Sky Atlantic, HBO and Canal+. It is a continuation of the 2016 series The Young Pope, originally announced as its second season. The nine-episode series stars Jude Law, reprising his role as the fictional Pope Pius XIII, and John Malkovich as the fictional Pope John Paul III, the titular new pope. It was co-produced by The Apartment Pictures, Wildside, Haut et Court TV and Mediapro.

The series premiered on 10 January 2020 on Sky Atlantic in Italy.

== Plot ==
The New Pope opens with Pope Pius XIII still in a coma, revered as a living saint by a growing cult of followers. Amid concerns that this reverence could spark dangerous idolatry, Cardinal Secretary of State Voiello insists on a conclave to elect a new Pope, and schemes to elect a malleable, Franciscan-inspired candidate: Cardinal Viglietti, who becomes Pope Francis II. However, Francis II quickly asserts himself with sweeping, radical reforms—redistributing church wealth and welcoming refugees—which alarm the conservative cardinals. His sudden death, likely an assassination orchestrated by the scheming Bauer, leaves the church in turmoil. Meanwhile, the cardinals seek a safer, centrist replacement: Sir John Brannox, an aristocratic theologian famed for his work The Middle Way. As they court him at his English estate, Brannox’s psychological fragility and deep guilt over his twin brother’s death begin to emerge, yet he ultimately agrees to take the papacy as John Paul III.

As John Paul III assumes his role, he is quickly entangled in the Vatican's political games. His attempts to modernize the Church—including proposals for marriage equality within the clergy—are both applauded and manipulated by factions such as Cardinal Spalletta, who uses blackmail to ascend to power. Voiello, sensing danger, resigns after strategically consolidating his influence one last time. The undercurrents of corruption run deep: Sofia uncovers a sex scandal implicating her husband and other senior officials, and Esther descends into sex work to survive, even striking an unsettling arrangement with a wealthy family. Meanwhile, the Pope's inner world begins to unravel; haunted by his past drug addiction and plagiarized legacy, he teeters between visionary ideals and personal collapse. As terror threats loom and the Church's political maneuvering intensifies, Pius XIII's mythic presence lingers—soon to reemerge.

Pius XIII miraculously awakens, recovering in secret while John Paul III suffers a personal and spiritual breakdown triggered by a terror attack. Tensions rise as Esther's faction of idolaters splinters, some believing Pius to be dead. The Church faces increasing pressure from both internal blackmailers and external threats, leading to a brutal power reckoning. Voiello returns as Secretary of State, orchestrating the fall of corrupt allies and restoring order with ruthless efficiency. The climax centers on a school hostage crisis, initially blamed on Islamic extremists, but later revealed to be the work of Pius XIII's fanatical devotees—including Esther herself. After resolving the crisis and delivering a final sermon praising moderation, Pius XIII dies in front of the faithful. His legacy, forged in contradiction and holiness, gives way to Voiello's own papacy, as various characters find closure: Sister Caterina reunites with Faisal, Esther's child is adopted, and the retired John Paul III finally reconciles with his family. The series closes as faith, power, and humanity converge in bittersweet resolution.

== Cast ==
=== Main ===
- Jude Law as Pope Pius XIII (born Lenny Belardo), the comatose pope
- John Malkovich as Pope John Paul III (formerly Sir John Brannox), the titular new pope
- Silvio Orlando as Cardinal Angelo Voiello, Camerlengo and Cardinal Secretary of State, and the latest, unnamed pope by the end of the series / Cardinal Hernández, an opponent to Voiello during the conclave
- Cécile de France as Sofia Dubois, in charge of marketing for the Holy See
- Javier Cámara as Cardinal Bernardo Gutiérrez, the advisor of the Holy See
- Ludivine Sagnier as Esther Aubry, former wife of a member of the Pontifical Swiss Guard
- Maurizio Lombardi as Cardinal Mario Assente
- Marcello Romolo as Pope Francis II (born Tommaso Viglietti), the first pope elected during Pius XIII's coma (Note: Marcello Romolo is credited with the main cast in "Episode 1", while he is credited as guest starring in "Episode 3".)
- Mark Ivanir as Bauer, the Ambassador of the United States to the Holy See
- Henry Goodman as Danny, Sir John Brannox's butler
- Massimo Ghini as Cardinal Spalletta, the Pope's personal secretary
- Ulrich Thomsen as Dr Helmer Lindegard

=== Recurring ===
- Ramón García (Ramón García Monteagudo) as Cardinal Aguirre
- Antonio Petrocelli as Monsignor Luigi Cavallo, Cardinal Voiello's right-hand man
- Kiruna Stamell as the Abbess of the Monastery of Saint Therese, the head of the cloister nuns
- Nora Waldstätten as Sister Lisette, a cloister nun whose mother is ill
- Jessica Piccolo Valerani as Sister Pamela, a nun nursing comatose Pope Pius XIII in Venice
- Kika Georgiou as the Woman in Red, the head of a constant vigil over comatose Pope Pius XIII in Venice
- Nadie Kammallaweera as Sister Suree, a nun serving the pope in the Vatican
- Unknown actor as Girolamo Matera, Voiello's best friend who has a severe disability
- Massimo Cagnina as Don Mario, a priest who hosts Esther at his church
- Eco Andriolo Ranzi as Sister Caterina, a young cloister nun who commits fornication with a refugee
- Agnieszka Jania as Sister Ivanka, a young cloister nun
- Zaki Bibawi Ayyad as Faisal, a refugee hiding in the Vatican Gardens who later commits fornication with Sister Caterina
- Tomas Arana as Tomas Altbruck, Sofia's husband
- Claudio Bigagli as Duilio Guicciardini, the Italian Minister of Economy and Finance
- Janet Henfrey as the Duchess of Brannox, Sir John's mother
- Tim Barlow as the Duke of Brannox, Sir John's father
- Daria Baykalova as Amber, Bauer's girlfriend
- Alessandro Riceci as Fabiano, Esther's love interest
- Enea Barozzi as Attanasio, a young man with physical deformities
- Lore Stefanek as Attanasio's mother and a wealthy lawyer
- Alex Esola as Freddy Blakestone, a tennis player and Bernardo's lover
- Ignazio Oliva as Father Valente, one of the Pope's assistants
- Marcello Marziali as Don Mimmo, an old friend of Voiello's
- Giancarlo Fares as Franco, Girolamo's caregiver
- Daniel Vivian as Domen, the pope's butler
- J. David Hinze as Leopold Essence
- Yuliya Snigir as Ewa Novak, Helmer's wife

==== Flashbacks ====
- Charlie Potts and Joshua Smallwood as Adam Brannox, John's twin brother
- Callum Potts and Matthew Smallwood as young John Brannox
- Hella Stichlmair as young Duchess of Brannox, John's mother
- Jonas Crodack as young Duke of Brannox, John's father

=== Guests ===
- Marilyn Manson as himself
- Sharon Stone as herself
- Mitchell Mullen as Emory Kitsworth, a journalist
- Houssem Benali as Ahmed, an acquaintance of Faisal's
- Alex Beviglia Zampetti as Don Antonio, a teacher at Ventotene's elementary school
- Bruce McGuire as General Parker

== Episodes ==
No.	Title	Directed by	Written by	Original release date	Ital. viewers (millions)
1	"First Episode"	Paolo Sorrentino	Paolo Sorrentino & Umberto Contarello & Stefano Bises	10 January 2020	0.22; 0.43 (o.n.)
After nine months and several failed heart transplants, Pope Pius XIII remains comatose, but has developed a cult following and is revered as a saint by many. On the advice of Bauer, the Ambassador of the Holy See, Voiello decides a new pope must be elected to prevent Pius XIII from becoming a false idol. Realizing the papal conclave is unwilling to elect him, he and allies engage in tactical voting to prevent his opponent Cardinal Hernández from being selected. They instead elect the mild-mannered Cardinal Viglietti, a devout follower of Francis of Assisi, hoping to influence him by proxy. Adopting the name Pope Francis II, Viglietti quickly acclimates to his power and introduces radical charitable reforms to the church, such as allowing masses of refugees shelter in the Vatican, taking full control of the Vatican Archives and finances with the intent of giving them away, and compelling the College of Cardinals to surrender their valuables. The reforms, plus Viglietti's intent to defrock Voiello, cause the latter and Hernández to plot to replace him with the more moderate Sir John Brannox, who was the third preference in the election. Pope Francis II suffers an apparent heart attack and dies, implied to have been orchestrated by Bauer. Pope Pius XIII, having been comatose for months, finally moves his finger.
2	"Second Episode"	Paolo Sorrentino	Paolo Sorrentino & Umberto Contarello & Stefano Bises	10 January 2020	0.17; 0.43 (o.n.)
Voiello, Assente, Gutiérrez, Aguirre and Sofia travel to England to meet with Brannox and convince him to accept the role of pope before the papal conclave votes. A member of British aristocracy and admirer of John Henry Newman, Brannox is renowned in the church for the conversion of Anglicans to Catholicism and for a theological text, The Middle Way, published in his youth. The cardinals believe this centrist philosophy will restore order to the Vatican after the death of Francis II and the state of Pius XIII. Upon arrival at the Brannox estate, the group are shown to their bedrooms, where each of them (as well as Brannox) feels the presence of Pius XIII. In the Vatican, Sofia's husband Tomas meets with the Italian Minister of Economy and Finance and Cardinal Spalletta, who reveals he will be able to manipulate Brannox as he knows his one and only secret. The next morning, Voiello meets with Brannox, who reveals his elderly parents live in a separate wing so they never see him, believing him guilty for the death of his twin, Adam, whom they mourn daily. The group is taken aback by Brannox's eccentricity and candidness, but a later meal where the cardinal expands on his philosophy cements their decision to select him. Brannox informs them he will have a decision by morning. In the Vatican, a television broadcasts an anti-Christian message from an unknown Islamic caliphate before turning off.
3	"Third Episode"	Paolo Sorrentino	Paolo Sorrentino & Umberto Contarello & Stefano Bises	17 January 2020	N/A
Brannox discusses the possibility of being pope with Sofia and Gutiérrez. He later speaks to his parents, noting how ironic it is that their preferred long-gone son Adam could not become a prominent ecclesiastic figure, while he, the disgraced son, is now offered the highest position in the Church. He tells them he resents them for their contempt, and that he deserves to be pope because of that. Despite this, in the morning, he informs the others of his decision to decline the offer. However, Voiello manages to persuade him and they all return to Rome, where Brannox is elected Pope John Paul III and has his first homily. In financial hardship, Esther is introduced to Fabiano, a single man, and they begin a sexual relationship. Fabiano later informs Esther that a mother is paying good money for a woman to engage in sexual intercourse with her son Attanasio, who has physical deformities. Esther is initially irritated by the proposal, but she goes to see the son, only to run shortly after undressing. The Abbess and Sister Lisette ask Cavallo for money to allow Lisette to accompany her ill mother to Lourdes before she dies; Cavallo pretends to help them, but actually ignores their request. The pope addresses the cardinals, saying that tenderness has to be preferred over passion and that the Church has to learn how to love properly. Voiello discovers a young refugee, Faisal, hidden in a tool house, but ignores him; Faisal later meets with Sister Caterina in a cloister.
4	"Fourth Episode"	Paolo Sorrentino	Paolo Sorrentino & Umberto Contarello & Stefano Bises	17 January 2020	N/A
Pope John Paul III receives Marilyn Manson, who suggests he visit Pope Pius in Venice. After giving a speech against pedophilia, John Paul is presented with a Bentley car by Cardinal Spalletta, who subtly blackmails him into appointing him as secretary. Cavallo tells Voiello that the nuns have occupied the Sistine Chapel and gone on strike, asking for respect from other churchmen. Voiello receives the Abbess and Sister Lisette, the leader of the strike, to hear them out, but advises them not to make an enemy of him; they later ask for a meeting with the Pope. Pope John Paul visits Pope Pius in Venice; when he leaves the hospital, the leader of a vigil for Pius XIII stops him and whispers in his ear. Back in the Vatican, Pope John Paul III confirms Sofia and Voiello's positions, nominates Gutiérrez as his advisor and Spalletta as his personal secretary in charge of creativity. In private, Spalletta advises the pope not to make an enemy of Voiello, despite his possible involvement in the assassination of Pope Francis II. Gutiérrez visits his lover, Freddy, and they have sex; he later confesses his sin to the pope. The Italian Government informs the Vatican they plan to repeal the eight per thousand law, cutting off the Church from taxpayer money. Later, Spalletta says to the pope that he can persuade the Minister of Economy and Finance to delay the measure until the incumbent government falls. Esther returns to Attanasio, allowing him to touch her.
5	"Fifth Episode"	Paolo Sorrentino	Paolo Sorrentino & Umberto Contarello & Stefano Bises	24 January 2020	0.25 (o.n.)
Sharon Stone meets with John Paul III and proposes gay marriage for Catholics and that the Vatican should better support modern artists. There is a terrorist attack in Lourdes, France. Sofia receives the pope's private number, and later meets him in the Vatican Necropolis where he confides in her his idea to legalise heterosexual and homosexual marriage for the clergy in order to reduce levels of sexual abuse in the church. Faisal and Sister Caterina meet and make love in the garden shed and she later discovers she is pregnant. Voiello and Bauer meet and discuss Spalletta and Altbruck's partnership. John Paul III travels to Lourdes after the terror attack where he is greeted by a large enthusiastic crowd; their reaction widely reported in the international and Italian press. In Venice, reporters hear Pius XIII breathing and a radio declares that they will broadcast only this from now on; Voiello and the cardinals tune in. Gutiérrez sees Freddy again. After doing some sex work and paying Fabiano a share for acting as a procurator, Esther cuts loose with him and leaves her accommodation at the church with her son.
6	"Sixth Episode"	Paolo Sorrentino	Paolo Sorrentino & Umberto Contarello & Stefano Bises	24 January 2020	0.25 (o.n.)
Sofia is met by the sinister and mysterious Leopold Essence, who tells her to "follow the love to find failure." Esther returns to Attanasio and makes a deal with his mother to see other boys in need of sexual attention. Sofia goes to Voiello after discovering that her husband, Spalletta and Guicciardini have sex with an underage escort girl together; Voiello gives this news to the pope. John Paul III meets Spalletta, who explains the situation is to please Guicciardini, who is protecting the church by convincing the Prime Minister to postpone new laws, which include a proposed retroactive tax on church buildings. Spalletta then argues that due to his secretive Machiavellianism, Voiello should be replaced as Secretary of State. John Paul III meets Voiello and suggests he resigns. In response, Voiello first transfers Cardinal Hernandez to a missionary posting in Kabul, and then meets the nuns and grants their wishes before resigning and being replaced by Assente. Esther strangles Attanasio's mother when the latter tells Esther that her work is over. John Paul III agrees to do a television interview with journalist Emory Kitsworth, which he leaves mid-way through due displaying symptoms of withdrawal. Esther goes to Venice and prays for forgiveness to Pius XIII, and is embraced by one of his followers.
7	"Seventh Episode"	Paolo Sorrentino	Paolo Sorrentino & Umberto Contarello & Stefano Bises	31 January 2020	0.25 (o.n.)
Faisal is removed from the Vatican on orders of Assente. Pope Pius XIII finally awakens from his coma against all medical predictions, and is taken secretly to the home of his cardiologist Dr. Lindegard to recuperate. He meets Lindegard's wife, Ewa Novak, who suffers from severe depression due to their sons severe myotonic dystrophy. Believing Pius XIII to be a saint and the second coming of Jesus, she angrily pleads he cure her child. Despite refuting her claims, he still prays desperately for the disabled boy and encourages the couple to rekindle their relationship. Pius XIII's idolatric following splits, with a faction led by Esther believing he has been killed. A terror attack (which Faisal is implied to be a part of) takes place in St. Peter's Basilica which kills John Paul III's dog, causing him to fall into a deep depression. Sofia seeks the retired Voiello's advice on the fragile pope's state and is told to ride his weakness. John Paul III confesses to Gutiérrez that he is a drug addict, and more importantly that he plagiarized The Middle Way from his dead twin brother's work.
8	"Eighth Episode"	Paolo Sorrentino	Paolo Sorrentino & Umberto Contarello & Stefano Bises	31 January 2020	0.25 (o.n.)
Bauer meets with Voiello, informing him Pius XIII has awoken and that they need to restore the weak John Paul III in order to return the Vatican to strength, as his practices help divert attention from the church's scandals. He warns of the likelihood of another terror attack from the Caliph, and implies the death of Francis II was caused by the comatose pontiff. John Paul III retreats to the Alps and is met by Sofia, who reveals leaked photos of him as a punk in his youth in Vanity Fair have restored public opinion of him despite his behaviour in the interview and after the terror attack. He divulges to her how his brother, Adam, died in a skiing accident, and how he was unable to save him due to being high on heroin. Voiello returns as Secretary of State, as Assente is forced to resign following a remark regarding orphaned children, as well as being entrapped into revealing his homosexuality. Bauer and Essence put an end to Spalletta, Altbruck and Guicciardini's blackmail of John Paul III. Pius XIII returns to Rome in secret, and plans his public comeback with Voiello in addition to voicing his anger at the Caliph's attacks on the church. He also meets with the nuns and promises moderate reform. Voiello's friend Girolamo dies, and receives an elaborate Vatican funeral. Voiello advises John Paul III that Pius XIII cannot remain an emeritus, and the two must meet to discuss the future in person.
9	"Ninth Episode"	Paolo Sorrentino	Paolo Sorrentino & Umberto Contarello & Stefano Bises	7 February 2020	0.22 (o.n.)
Sofia resigns as head of marketing after ensuring her husband and his co-conspirators are arrested. A hostage crisis emerges at an elementary school on Ventotene. Pius XIII and John Paul III meet to discuss the matter, believing the caliphate is to blame. A furious Pius XIII proposes the papacy come down hard on the perpetrators and threatens to reveal himself to the world, robbing the caliphate of their monopoly on religious fanaticism and potentially starting a new religious war. He gains the support of the cardinals in secret, and convinces John Paul III to echo his sentiments publicly, but this results in a hostage being executed. Bauer forces a meeting between Voiello and a senior member of the caliphate, who informs the cardinal they are not behind the hostage crisis. A regretful Pius XIII meets with John Paul III, who surprisingly abdicates and returns home, fulfilling his wish to be forgotten. Pius XIII, now back in power, visits the school accompanied by DIGOS officers. The perpetrators then unveil themselves as his idolaters, including Esther, and are arrested. In St. Peter's Square, Pius XIII gives a speech exulting The Middle Way, remarking such an approach should simply be the way of the church. He then interacts with the crowd but dies peacefully whilst being paraded back to St. Peter's Basilica. Ewa Novak is pregnant with another child. Sister Lisette is able to visit her dying mother. Sister Caterina gives birth to her baby and leaves the nunnery, reuniting with a released Faisal. Back in England, Pope Emeritus John Paul III is finally re-embraced by his parents and is later visited by Sofia. Voiello succeeds Pius XIII as the new pope, having adopted Esther's child.

== Production ==
The New Pope production began in Italy in late 2018. Filming took place inside St. Peter's Basilica in Vatican City in November 2018. Some scenes were shot in Milan in January and February 2019. The production crew also filmed in Venice in January and April 2019. Most of the filming took place at Cinecittà, in Rome. The crew returned to Rome to film at the St. Peter's Square in March 2019. Additional scenes were shot in Abruzzo and on the river Piave. The opening sequence of the series with dancing nuns was filmed inside San Giorgio Monastery in Venice.

== Release ==
The series had its world premiere on 1 September 2019 at the 76th Venice International Film Festival, where episodes 2 and 7 were screened out of competition. It debuted on television on 10 January 2020 on Sky Atlantic in Italy, on 12 January on Sky Atlantic in the UK and Ireland and on 13 January on HBO and Canal+.

=== Marketing ===
The official teaser for the series was released on 28 August 2019. The second teaser trailer premiered on 3 November 2019. The official full trailer was released on 10 December 2019.

=== Critical reception ===
The series received positive response from critics. On review aggregator website Rotten Tomatoes, the series holds an approval rating of 90% based on 49 reviews. The website's critical consensus reads, "Though its predecessor's shadow looms large, devout fans will still find much to like in The New Pope's exploration of power dynamics and sumptuous strangeness." On Metacritic it has a weighted average score of 63 out of 100, based on 12 critics, signifying "generally favorable reviews".

== See also ==
- Hadrian the Seventh
