= Second Episode =

- The New Pope episode
- Episode no.: Season 1 Episode 2
- Directed by: Paolo Sorrentino
- Written by: Paolo Sorrentino; Umberto Contrarello; Stefano Bises
- Original air date: January 10, 2020
- Running time: 51 minutes

Episode chronology
← Previous "First Episode"	Next → "Third Episode"

"Second Episode" is the second episode of the HBO television series The New Pope. The episode was directed by series creator Paolo Sorrentino and was written by Paolo Sorrentino, Umberto Contrarello, and Stefano Bises.

The episode takes place in Vatican City, England, and Italy. It mostly follows a Vatican delegation attempting to secure a commitment from Sir John Brannox, a cardinal and member of the British nobility, to become pope should he be elected.

== Plot ==
Voiello, Assente, Gutiérrez, Aguirre and Sofia travel to England to meet with Brannox and convince him to accept the role of pope before the papal conclave votes. A member of British aristocracy and admirer of John Henry Newman, Brannox is renowned in the church for the conversion of Anglicans to Catholicism and for a theological text, The Middle Way, published in his youth. The cardinals believe this centrist philosophy will restore order to the Vatican after the death of Francis II and the state of Pius XIII.

Upon arrival at the Brannox estate, the group are shown to their bedrooms, where each of them (as well as Brannox) feels the presence of Pius XIII. In the Vatican, Sofia's husband Tomas meets with the Italian Minister of Economy and Finance and Cardinal Spalletta, who reveals he will be able to manipulate Brannox as he knows his one and only secret.

The next morning, Voiello meets with Brannox, who reveals his elderly parents live in a separate wing so they never see him, believing him guilty for the death of his twin, Adam, whom they mourn daily. The group is taken aback by Brannox's eccentricity and candidness, but a later meal where the cardinal expands on his philosophy cements their decision to select him. Brannox informs them he will have a decision by morning. In the Vatican, a television broadcasts an anti-Christian message from an unknown Islamic caliphate before turning off.

== Reception ==
The episode received positive reviews from critics. Eric Thurm, in a review written for The A.V. Club, praised the introduction of John Malkovich's character, Sir John Brannox, and Malkovich's acting. D.J. Rivera, writing for FanSided, also praised Malkovich's acting.
