= Vader Episode I: Shards of the Past =

2018 Star Wars fan film

- Directed by: Danny Ramirez
- Written by: Danny Ramirez; Star Wars Theory; Nikolaj Wejp-Olsen
- Based on: Characters by George Lucas
- Produced by: Ian McClellan; Brandon Hall; Star Wars Theory (executive producer)
- Starring: Dupree Jones; Steven Bartlett; Catherine LaSalle; Marik Knight; Star Wars Theory; Andrew Branch; Jesse Gomez; Bradley Klein
- Cinematography: Matthew Halla (director of photography)
- Edited by: Danny Ramirez
- Music by: Jacob A. Cadmus; J Scott Rakozy (additional music)
- Release dates: December 20, 2018 (Los Angeles Premiere); December 21, 2018
- Running time: 16:18
- Countries: United States; Canada
- Language: English
- Budget: $30,000 (initial) $164,000

Vader Episode I: Shards of the Past is a 2018 Star Wars fan film created by Star Wars Theory. In the film, Darth Vader fights between losing Padmé and serving the new master who promised to save her.

On December 20, 2018, a screening was held at the Landmark's Regent Theatre in Los Angeles, CA, and on December 21, 2018, it was released to YouTube.

On July 27th, 2026, a sequel, Vader Episode II: Echoes of the Jedi was released during a theatrical event, and the next day was released on YouTube. A planned third episode is in early development.

== Plot ==
The film takes place eight months after Star Wars: Episode III – Revenge of the Sith, and focuses around one of the main villains of the Star Wars saga, Darth Vader. Fighting between the loss of Padmé, and the new cursed life he now leads, Vader must do what must be done when a surviving Jedi Master from Order 66 has lured him to the home planet of his late wife's tomb.

== Cast ==
- Dupree Jones as Darth Vader
- Jesse Gomez as the voice of Darth Vader
- Star Wars Theory (Neo) as unmasked Darth Vader
- Marik Knight as Young Anakin Skywalker
- Steven Bartlett as Emperor Palpatine
- Bradley Klein as the voice of Emperor Palpatine
- Catherine LaSalle as Padmé Amidala
- Andrew Branch as Commander Fox

== Copyright controversy ==
Prior to the film's release, Star Wars Theory exchanged emails with Lucasfilm asking permission to crowdfund the short film or make any revenue from it. Lucasfilm permitted its creation, but with no crowdfunding or revenue.

After its release, Warner/Chappell Music gave the film a copyright claim on YouTube about its soundtrack. Star Wars Theory had hired a composer to make an original soundtrack, which was inspired by the Star Wars score. Instead of the video being unmonetized as Lucasfilm requested, it would generate ad revenue for Warner/Chappell. Star Wars Theory explained, "It's not about the money, it's the principle. When [Lucasfilm] come to me with these rules… but then someone goes in there and manually claims it… to me, that’s very vindictive and very rude. Disney makes billions of dollars. This is pennies to them. It seems that they really don't respect anything at all for the fandom."

Over the Internet, Star Wars Theory received coverage from Newsweek, Syfy Wire, and other YouTubers. On January 16, 2019, Star Wars Theory announced that Lucasfilm had forced the copyright strike to come down, restoring the video to its original state.

== Reception ==
Vader Episode I: Shards of the Past has received positive critical reviews. Luke Y. Thompson of Nerdist gave it a positive review, calling it "impressive", as he said Vader would have put it. Ryan Chichester of Comic Book Resources stated, "The film boasts a high level of production, voice impersonations of multiple Star Wars characters, and an intriguing story". Julie Muncy of io9 said, "...the star here is the visual design, which captures a live-action Star Wars look perfectly. It's particularly thrilling to see Clone Wars-style clone armor in live action. It's well worth a watch for that alone." Corey Chichizola of Cinema Blend claims, "It helps make [Darth Vader's] actions in Return of The Jedi make more sense, and expands the franchise's signature character in a fascinating way." Kristian Harloff of Collider said that the film encapsulated the spirit of Star Wars extremely well and expressed interest in wanting a second part. He also called the writing and dialogue being a bit weak. Ken Napzok, who was with Harloff at the time of recording, noted the amount of passion Star Wars Theory put into the film, and said that the film reminded him of other Star Wars fan films—in particular, Troops and Hardware Wars.
