= Lethe – Episode One =

2016 survival horror video game

- Developer: KoukouStudios
- Publisher: Faber Interactive
- Engine: Unreal Engine 3
- Platform: Microsoft Windows
- Release: 1 August 2016
- Genre: survival horror game
- Mode: Single-player

Lethe – Episode One is a 2016 first-person survival horror video game created by Greek indie developer Koukou Studios and published by Faber Interactive. It was released on 1 August 2016. Episode One is the first game of the Lethe series of planned video games that take place in the same universe but as of March 2018, no other episodes were published, which is why Episode One is also referred to as Lethe.

Episode One tells the story of Robert Dawn, a man on an adventure to fill in gaps in his memory. It received mixed reviews from critics.

== Synopsis ==
After his father died, protagonist Robert Dawn finds documents that reveal that he has forgotten a significant part of his past, prompting him to go on a quest for discovery. The game starts with Dawn washing up at the shore of an unknown mining town. In the course of the game, he has to navigate different environments and avoid enemies as he tries to piece together his forgotten past.

== Gameplay ==
Players take control of Robert Dawn from a first-person perspective. Unlike other adventure games, there are no weapons or combat. Instead, players have to rely on stealthily navigating the landscape, avoiding various hazards such as acid lakes and chasm. The player has three statistics, health, stamina and (psychic) energy, the latter of which allows them to use Dawn's telekinetic powers which the character develops mid-game. The game has no inventory system, allowing players to only carry five health and energy packs but nothing else.

== Development ==
Episode One was built using the Unreal Engine and first posted to Steam Greenlight on 31 August 2012. Two teaser trailers were released in March 2014, prompting comparisons to Psi-Ops: The Mindgate Conspiracy and Amnesia. In November 2014, an alpha gameplay trailer was released. While the protagonist originally was supposed to wield multiple magic-like powers like shooting fireballs and lightning, the character's powers were reduced to telekinesis to emphasize the stealth approach.

== Reception ==
Reviewers praised the visual and audio design, highlighting that the immersive graphics and sounds will create a feeling for players as if they are actually in the game. Critics also emphasized that the game actually manages to scare players.

Conversely, the slow pace, forcing players to go slow even if they preferred faster travel, and the save system, forcing players to replay major parts of a level when the protagonist died, were criticized.
