= Sarah Phelps =

English playwright

Sarah Phelps is a British television screenwriter, radio writer, playwright and television producer. She is best known for her work on EastEnders, a number of BBC serial adaptations including Agatha Christie's The Witness for the Prosecution, And Then There Were None, Ordeal by Innocence, The ABC Murders and The Pale Horse; Charles Dickens's Great Expectations and Oliver Twist; and J. K. Rowling's The Casual Vacancy, as well as work with the Royal Shakespeare Company.

== Career ==
Phelps has written over 90 episodes of EastEnders, including the return of Den Watts and his final demise, less than two years later. She wrote the screenplay for the BBC's 2011 Christmas costume drama adaptation Great Expectations and the World War One drama series The Crimson Field. The show was cancelled after one series due to middling ratings.

In 2015, she wrote a television adaptation of J. K. Rowling's The Casual Vacancy. In 2020, BBC One commissioned Phelps to write and produce The Sixth Commandment, a four part factual drama about the deaths of Peter Farquhar and Ann Moore-Martin, which began to air on BBC One on 17 July 2023. In March 2024, the series was nominated in the Best Limited Drama category at the 2024 British Academy Television Awards, and won.

=== Christie adaptations ===
In 2015, Phelps's adaptation of Agatha Christie's And Then There Were None was broadcast. Reviewing it for The Daily Telegraph, Tim Martin found that, "The final episode of this bloody adaptation by Sarah Phelps did splendid justice to Christie's lightless universe, presenting an isolated mansion full of leaking corpses, in which the characters – quite understandably – freaked out in ways that no previous adaptation has countenanced."

In 2016 The Witness for the Prosecution went to air, with a script based on the original short story rather than the later play on which other screen adaptations have been based.

In April 2018, another of Agatha Christie's novels adapted by Phelps was broadcast on BBC One. Ordeal by Innocence had been pulled from the Christmas scheduling on BBC One after one of the leading actors in the drama miniseries was accused of sexual assault. The programme was re-shot with a new actor, Christian Cooke, replacing Ed Westwick.

In June 2018 it was announced that the BBC were filming a Phelps adaptation of Agatha Christie's The A.B.C. Murders starring John Malkovich as Hercule Poirot.

In June 2019 it was announced that Phelps would write a new adaptation of The Pale Horse.

== Filmography ==
Year	Title	Episode(s)	Broadcaster
2002–2016	EastEnders	94 episodes	BBC One
2003	Spine Chillers	1 episode	BBC Three
2003 2006	No Angels	3 episodes	Channel 4
2006	Goldplated	1 episode	Channel 4
2007	Oliver Twist	Miniseries, 5 episodes	BBC One
2007–2008	HolbyBlue	3 episodes	BBC One
2011	Being Human	1 episode	BBC Three
2011	Camelot	1 episode	Starz
2011	Great Expectations	Miniseries, 3 episodes	BBC One
2012	Falcón	2 episodes	Sky Atlantic
2014	The Crimson Field	Creator, 6 episodes	BBC One
2015	The Casual Vacancy	Miniseries, 3 episodes	BBC One
2015	And Then There Were None	Miniseries, 3 episodes	BBC One
2015–2016	Dickensian	5 episodes	BBC One
2016–2017	Hooten & the Lady	Co-creator 8 episodes, wrote 1 episode	Sky 1
2016	The Witness for the Prosecution	Miniseries, 2 episodes	BBC One
2017	The White Princess	1 episode	Starz
2018	Ordeal by Innocence	Miniseries, 3 episodes	BBC One
2018	The ABC Murders	Miniseries, 3 episodes	BBC One
2019	Dublin Murders	Miniseries, 8 episodes	BBC One/Starz
2020	The Pale Horse	Miniseries, 2 episodes	BBC One
2021	A Very British Scandal	Miniseries, 3 episodes	BBC One
2023	The Sixth Commandment	Miniseries, 4 episodes	BBC One
TBA	Daughter		ITV

== Other work ==
Phelps's radio work includes Vital Signs II, Cardamom, The Collected Works of Billy the Kid and The Compass Rose: A Tattoo Lexicon. Phelps also wrote for the World Service Soap opera Westway before joining the BBC in 2002. Her theatre projects include Tube, Angela Carter, The Subtle Art of Boiling Lobsters, Amaretti Angels and Modern Dance for Beginners.
