= Jonny Campbell (director) =

British director

Jonny Campbell is a British film and television director.

== Education ==
Campbell studied French and German at Durham University.

== Career ==
Campbell started his career at Granada TV working on documentaries. He soon moved into drama.

== Filmography ==
Film

- Alien Autopsy (2006)
- Cold Storage (2026)

TV series

Year	Title	Notes
1997	New Voices	Episode "Two Minutes"
1999	The Bill	Episode "Long Term Investment"
1999-2000	Peak Practice	5 episodes
2000	Glasgow Kiss	3 episodes
2001	Peter Kay's Phoenix Nights	6 episodes
2001-2002	Judge John Deed	Episodes "Duty of Care", "Political Expediency" and "Nobody's Fool"
2002	Born and Bred	Episodes "Buried Treasure" and "Judgment Day"
2003	Dream Team	Episode "Oh Come All Ye Faithful" (Also producer)
2004	Spooks	Episodes "Project Friendly Fire" and "The Sleeper"
2004	Shameless	Episodes "We're Going to the Moon", "We're Getting Married" and "Christmas in Chatsworth"
2008	Ashes to Ashes	4 episodes
2010	Doctor Who	Episodes "The Vampires of Venice" and "Vincent and the Doctor"
2013	In the Flesh	3 episodes
2016	Westworld	Episode "Contrapasso"
2018	Informer	6 episodes
2022	Am I Being Unreasonable?	Series 1 (Also executive producer)
2027	Hercule	Episode "Lord Edgware Dies" (Part 1 and 2)

TV movies

- Big Smoke (2000) (Also writer)
- The Abbey (2007)
- Eric and Ernie (2011)

Miniseries

Year	Title	Notes
2003	Death in Holy Orders	
2015	The Casual Vacancy	
2017	The Last Post	Episodes "The New Man", "Starfish" and "Above Thy Deep and Dreamless Sleep"
2020	Dracula	Episode "The Rules of the Beast"
