= The Casual Vacancy =

2012 novel by J.K. Rowling

- First edition worldwide cover
- Author: J. K. Rowling
- Genre: Fiction, tragicomedy
- Publisher: Little, Brown and Company
- Publication date: 27 September 2012
- Publication place: United Kingdom
- Pages: 503
- ISBN: 9781408704202

The Casual Vacancy is a novel written by British author J. K. Rowling, published worldwide by the Little, Brown Book Group on 27 September 2012. It was Rowling's first publication since the Harry Potter series, her first novel apart from that series, and her first for adult readership.

The novel is set in a suburban West Country town called Pagford and begins with the death of beloved parish councillor Barry Fairbrother. Consequently, a seat on the council is vacant and a conflict ensues before the election for his successor takes place. Factions develop, particularly concerning whether to dissociate with a local council estate, 'the Fields', with which Barry supported an alliance. However, those running for a place soon find their darkest secrets revealed on the Parish Council online forum, ruining their campaign and leaving the election in turmoil.

Major themes in the novel are class, politics, and social issues such as drugs, prostitution and rape. The novel was the fastest-selling in the United Kingdom in three years, and had the second best-selling opening week for an adult novel there since Dan Brown's The Lost Symbol. It became the 15th best-selling book of 2012 during its first week of release. Within the first three weeks the book's total sales topped one million copies in English in all formats across all territories, including the US and the UK. The book also set a Goodreads record for the all-time biggest 'started reading' day, later winning the Best Fiction category in the Goodreads Choice Awards 2012.

A paperback edition was released on 23 July 2013. The book was adapted into a television drama broadcast in 2015.

== Contents ==
The book is dedicated to Rowling's husband, Neil Murray. This was the third time Murray has received a dedication from his wife, after she shared a dedication in the fifth Harry Potter book, Harry Potter and the Order of the Phoenix and the seventh Harry Potter book, Harry Potter and the Deathly Hallows.

The book is split into seven parts, and features varying narratives. Each section is headed by a definition from Charles Arnold-Baker's book Local Council Administration.

=== Plot summary ===
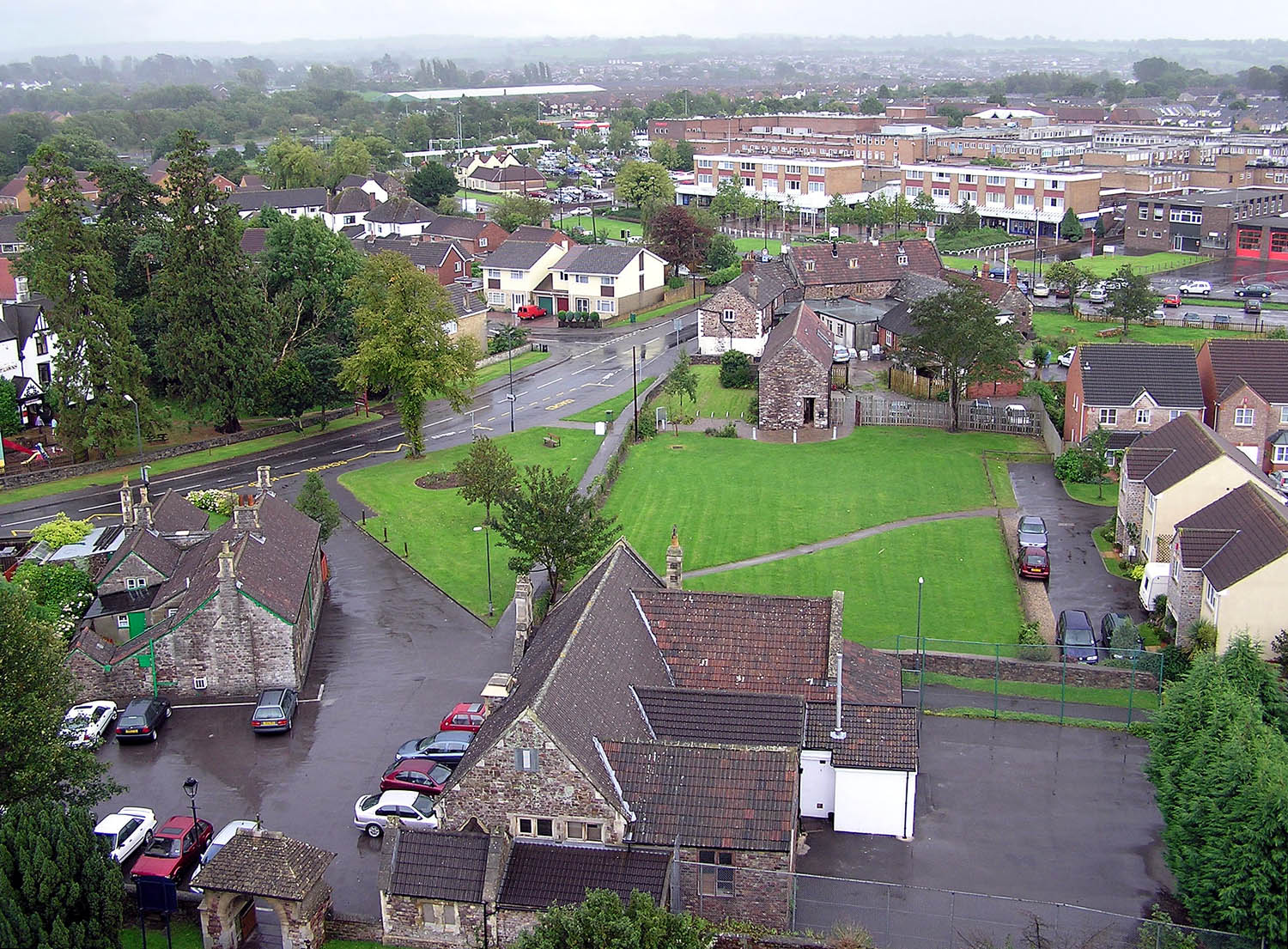
Fictional town Pagford is located in the West Country, much like Rowling's birthplace Yate, Gloucestershire

The novel is split into seven parts, the first depicting the death of local Pagford Parish Councillor, Barry Fairbrother, who suffers a burst aneurysm in the car park of a local golf course. The inhabitants of the town share the news with their friends and relatives and chaos ensues. The problem arises in deciding whether local council estate 'The Fields' should join the local city of Yarvil, or remain as part of Pagford as Fairbrother favoured; his death is seen by many as an opportunity to end the debate once and for all. The fate of the methadone rehabilitation clinic, Bellchapel, is also a key controversy in the parish.

After the date for the election of Fairbrother's replacement is announced, the children of some of the councillors and candidates decide to make damaging, yet often accurate, posts on the Parish Council online forum. Andrew Price is the first to do so, by means of an SQL injection which he learned how to perform in school, operating under the name 'The_Ghost_Of_Barry_Fairbrother' and informing everyone that his father, Simon, had obtained a stolen computer. Sukhvinder follows, posting that her mother, Dr. Parminder Jawanda, was in love with Barry. Thirdly, Fats Wall posts, claiming his adoptive father Cubby (a Deputy Headteacher) suffers from obsessive fear of having molested a child without any memory of the fact. Finally, in a desperate attempt to relieve the guilt weighing on him for costing his father his job, Andrew confides in Simon and posts that Council leader Howard Mollison is having an affair with his business partner Maureen. Howard's son, Miles Mollison, is the winning candidate, much to the displeasure of his wife, Samantha, who confesses she did not know if she still loves him, only to eventually reconcile.

Another focus of the novel is the traumatic life of Krystal Weedon. Sixteen-year-old Krystal lives in The Fields with her four-year-old brother Robbie and their heroin-addicted prostitute mother Terri. Social worker Kay is determined for Terri to stop her drug use and take responsibility for the care of Robbie; however, Terri relapses and her drug dealer Obbo rapes Krystal. Spurred on to start a family elsewhere, Krystal has unprotected sex with Fats in an attempt to become pregnant. It is during one of these instances that Robbie runs away from the pair in a park, eventually falling and drowning in a river, despite Sukhvinder's attempts to save him. Krystal is so distraught she commits suicide by taking a heroin overdose, the novel culminating with the siblings' funeral.

=== Characters ===
(The Telegraph published a guide to all 34 characters.)

- Barry Fairbrother, a member of the Parish Council who was born and raised in The Fields. Eloquent and fairminded, he is the leader of the faction of the Parish council wishing to keep The Fields in Pagford, in the hope the people can improve themselves as he did. He coached the girls' rowing team and was particularly fond of Krystal Weedon. It is his death that rocks the community.
- Mary Fairbrother, widow of Barry Fairbrother. Due to the fact that Barry was about to publish an article about The Fields prior to his demise, she blames The Fields for occupying his mind, and therefore causing his death.
- Howard Mollison, leader of the Parish Council and of those who seek to put the Fields under Yarvil control to safeguard the community. He is the owner of a delicatessen and married to Shirley. He is morbidly obese and suffers a heart attack after Andrew's anonymous accusations that he has had an affair with business partner Maureen.
- Shirley Mollison, wife of Howard Mollison and mother of Miles. She is devoted to Howard and all of his endeavours, until she learns of his affair with his business partner Maureen.
- Patricia 'Pat' Mollison, daughter of Howard and Shirley and sister to Miles, who lives in London and only comes to Pagford for her father's birthday party. Her relationship with her mother is strained due to her being gay. When she comes to Howard's birthday party, she drunkenly tells Fats and Andrew of the love affair between her father and Maureen.
- Miles Mollison, a lawyer who works with Gavin; he is the son of Howard and Shirley, brother of Pat and husband of Samantha. Miles runs for and eventually wins the council election.
- Samantha Mollison, wife of Miles and manager of a failing bra shop. Samantha hates her life in Pagford, and has lost interest in Miles. She fancies Vikram Jawanda, and 'Jake', a member of her daughter's favourite boyband, and ends up kissing sixteen-year-old Andrew Price. She despises her mother-in-law Shirley, and appears to have an alcohol problem.
- Krystal Weedon, a resident of 'The Fields' who dates Fats Wall. She suffers a traumatic childhood, raised by her heroin-addicted mother, frequently acting as sole caregiver to younger brother Robbie, and suffering rape at the hands of her mother's drug dealer. She commits suicide following Robbie's death.
- Terri Weedon, a heroin addict and prostitute, mother of Krystal and Robbie and resident of 'The Fields'. She has been ostracised by her family for her addiction. She attempts to rehabilitate through the Bellchapel clinic, but fails and ultimately relapses.
- Colin 'Cubby' Wall, Deputy Headteacher of the local comprehensive. He considers himself to be a close friend of Barry's and stands for election. This is later marred by anonymous accusations made by his adoptive son, 'Fats', that he is afraid of being accused of molesting a child. This considerably worsens his obsessive compulsive disorder; he often has nightmares about such acts.
- Tessa Wall, wife of Cubby and adoptive mother of Fats. She is the school's guidance counsellor and has regular meetings with Krystal Weedon, although she later disapproves of her relationship with her son. Also a diabetic.
- Stuart 'Fats' Wall, adopted son of Colin and Tessa, Andrew's best friend and popular at school due to his witty humour. He bullies Sukhvinder and begins a sexual relationship with Krystal Weedon. His strained relationship with his adoptive parents leaves him debating his morality and what his real parents are like. His only post as 'The_Ghost_of_Barry_Fairbrother' reveals his father's fears. When he partially causes Robbie Weedon's death, Tessa explains his birth mother had him when she was fourteen, possibly being the product of incest, and he was taken in despite Colin's poor health. He shoulders the blame for all the postings on the council website.
- Andrew Price, son of Simon and Ruth and Fats' best friend. He develops a romantic interest in Gaia Bawden, securing a weekend job in Howard's delicatessen to be around her. He secretly hates his father Simon for his domineering and abusive behaviour, and resents his mother for putting up with it. He creates the username of 'The_Ghost_of_Barry_Fairbrother' to accuse his father of selling stolen goods, to destroy his chances of running for election.
- Simon Price, husband of Ruth Price and Andrew and Paul's father, who is regularly involved in criminal activity. He physically and verbally abuses his children and wife, and decides to stand for election so he can receive bribes.
- Kay Bawden, a social worker from London and mother of Gaia. She moves to Pagford to be with her boyfriend Gavin, and becomes Krystal and Terri's social worker temporarily. She has the most success with Terri but is then forced to give up the family's case when her co-worker returns from sick leave. She eventually breaks up with Gavin.
- Gavin Hughes, a lawyer and Kay's boyfriend, although he is shown to resent her throughout the novel. He claims he was Barry's best friend and eventually confesses his love for Barry's widow, Mary, though she rejects his advances.
- Gaia Bawden, Kay's attractive daughter, fancied by Andrew. She befriends Sukhvinder and detests Pagford, knowing Gavin is not interested in her mother; she wants to move to Reading to be with her father. She eventually kisses Fats Wall, much to the disappointment of Andrew and Sukhvinder, but later regrets it and reconnects with both friends at Krystal's funeral.
- Parminder Jawanda, doctor and mother of Sukhvinder, whom she pressures to be upstanding like Parminder's other children. She is a member of the Parish Council and supporter of keeping "The Fields", although her motive may be her love of Barry, as posted by Sukhvinder posing as "The_Ghost_of_Barry_Fairbrother".
- Sukhvinder Jawanda, daughter of Parminder, is bullied by Fats, pressured by her mother to be great, and self-harms. She was a member of the rowing team alongside Krystal Weedon, but when Krystal's great-grandmother died while under Parminder's care, Krystal threatens to hurt Sukhvinder in revenge. Sukhvinder eventually risks her life in an attempt to save Krystal's brother, Robbie.
- Vikram Jawanda, handsome husband of Parminder Jawanda and father of Sukhvinder and her siblings. He is the heart surgeon who performed Howard's triple heart bypass.
- The Ghost of Barry Fairbrother, the secret identity of three Pagford teens who use Barry Fairbrother's old account on the Pagford council's forum to reveal secrets of council members. Andrew Price created the identity to attack his father, Sukhvinder uses it to discredit her mother, and Fats later uses it to smear his adoptive father. Andrew again uses it with his father against Howard Mollison to assuage his guilt. Fats eventually confesses and takes full responsibility following Robbie Weedon's death.

== Background ==
=== Conception ===
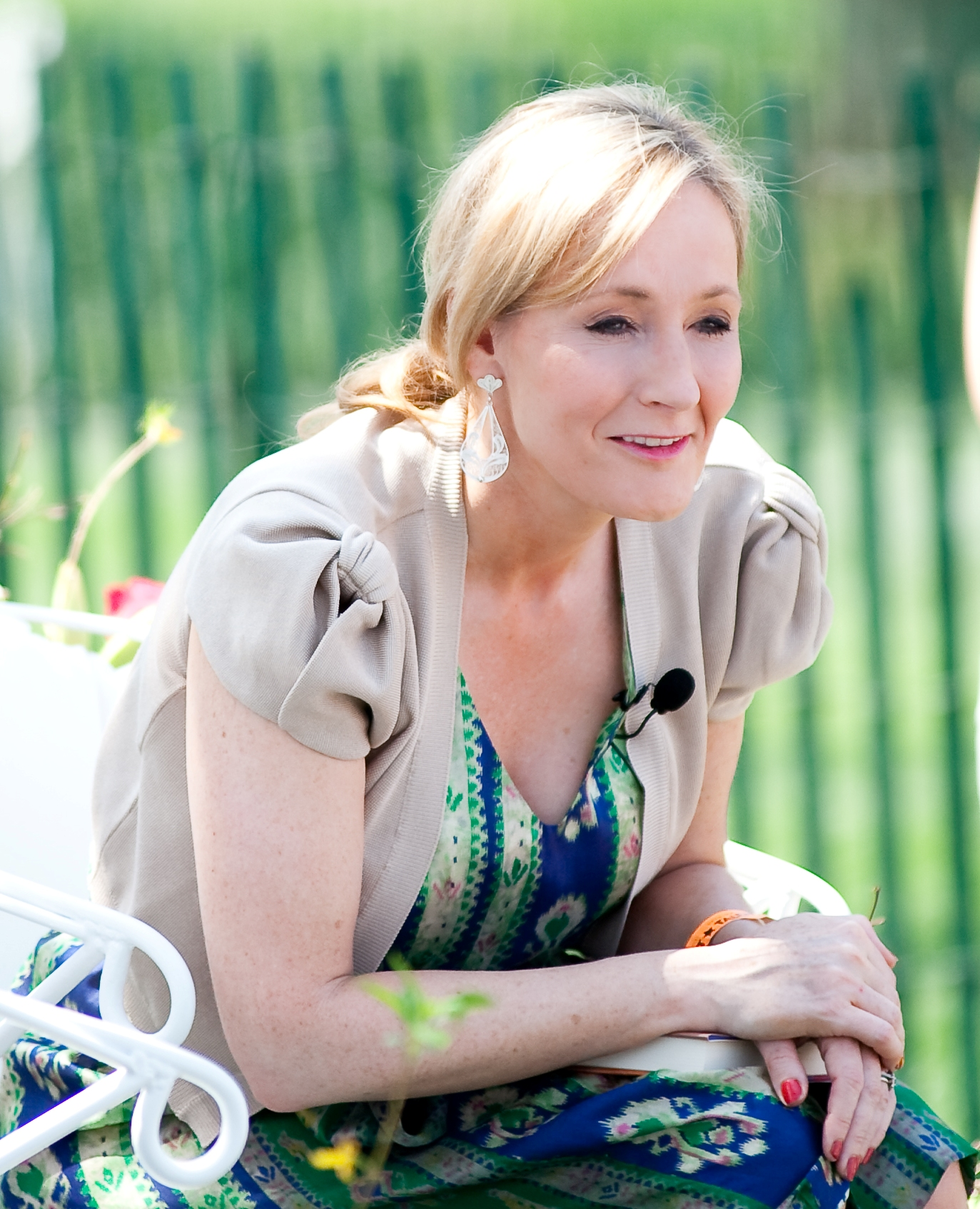
The Casual Vacancy is Rowling's first novel after the Harry Potter series, the best-selling book series in history

Rowling first had the idea on an aeroplane to the United States, whilst on tour for Harry Potter and the Deathly Hallows. Referring to the original conception of the Harry Potter series on a train from Manchester to London, Rowling said "Obviously I need to be in some form of vehicle to have a decent idea. This time I was on a plane. And I thought: local election! And I just knew. I had that totally physical response you get to an idea that you know will work. It's a rush of adrenaline, it's chemical. I had it with Harry Potter and I had it with this. So that's how I know."

Rowling's movement from children's literature to adult literature arose from being "ready to change genre". Referring to the Harry Potter series Rowling commented, "The thing about fantasy—there are certain things you just don't do in fantasy. You don't have sex near unicorns. It's an ironclad rule. It's tacky." Critics questioned whether younger Harry Potter fans might be drawn into wanting to read the book, Rowling responded saying, "There is no part of me that feels that I represented myself as your children's babysitter or their teacher. I was always, I think, completely honest. I'm a writer, and I will write what I want to write."

Rowling rejected Little, Brown's claims that the book was a "black comedy", saying in an interview with The New Yorker, "It's been billed, slightly, as a black comedy, but to me it's more of a comic tragedy." If the novel had precedents, "it would be sort of nineteenth-century: the anatomy and the analysis of a very small and closed society."

=== Choice of title ===
For two years, the working title of the novel was Responsible, until Rowling picked up Charles Arnold-Baker's work on local government, Local Council Administration, whilst looking something up and came across the term "casual vacancy." The New Yorker questioned Rowling's original choice of title, and she remarked "This is a book about responsibility. In the minor sense—how responsible we are for our own personal happiness, and where we find ourselves in life—but in the macro sense also, of course: how responsible we are for the poor, the disadvantaged, other people’s misery."

== Themes ==
=== Social issues ===
Casual Vacancy features a range of social issues, including rape, racism, heroin and marijuana use, pornography, domestic abuse, child abuse, self-harm and suicide.

Sukhvinder Jawanda is often berated by her mother, Parminder, and will resort to self-harm. Andrew Price, along with his brother Paul, suffers child abuse from their father Simon Price throughout the novel. The New Yorker questioned Rowling whether this represented her difficult childhood and relationship with her father; Rowling replied, "Andrew's romantic idea that he'll go and live among the graffiti and broken windows of London—that was me. I thought, I have to get away from this place. So all of my energies went into that", although she added, "I did not have an easy relationship with my father, but no one in The Casual Vacancy is a portrait of any living person."

=== Politics and poverty ===
One of the novel's major themes is politics. The Guardian referred to The Casual Vacancy as a "parable of national politics", with Rowling saying, "I'm interested in that drive, that rush to judgment, that is so prevalent in our society, We all know that pleasurable rush that comes from condemning, and in the short term it's quite a satisfying thing to do, isn't it?" Rowling was also critical of the Conservative-Liberal Democrat Coalition that had led since the general election in 2010 saying, "There has been a horribly familiar change of atmosphere [since the 2010 election], it feels to me a lot like it did in the early 90s, where there's been a bit of redistribution of benefits and suddenly lone-parent families are that little bit worse off. But it's not a 'little bit' when you're in that situation. Even a tenner a week can make such a vast, vast difference. So, yeah, it does feel familiar. Though I started writing this five years ago when we didn't have a coalition government, so it's become maybe more relevant as I've written." Rowling went on to say that Britain held a "phenomenally snobby society", and described the middle class as "pretentious" and "funny".

Rowling has commented on her economic situation before the success of Harry Potter as being "poor as it is possible to be in modern Britain, without being homeless" and said that this was why she was drawn to writing about poverty.

How many of us are able to expand our minds beyond our own personal experience? So many people, certainly people who sit around the cabinet table, say, 'Well, it worked for me' or, 'This is how my father managed it' – these trite catchphrases – and the idea that other people might have had such a different life experience that their choices and beliefs and behaviours would be completely different from your own seems to escape a lot of otherwise intelligent people. The poor are discussed as this homogeneous mash, like porridge. The idea that they might be individuals, and be where they are for very different, diverse reasons, again seems to escape some people.
– J. K. Rowling, The Guardian, "The worst that can happen is everyone says, That's shockingly bad", 2012.

== Reception ==
=== Critical response ===
The Casual Vacancy received mixed reviews. Lev Grossman for Time wrote in a positive review, "It's a big, ambitious, brilliant, profane, funny, deeply upsetting and magnificently eloquent novel of contemporary England, rich with literary intelligence and entirely bereft of bullshit." The Wall Street Journal wrote "Once you get your Mileses and Simonses straight and events begin to unfurl, it becomes a positively propulsive read. 'The Casual Vacancy' may not be George Eliot, but it's J.K. Rowling; and that's pretty good." The Guardian wrote, "The Casual Vacancy is no masterpiece, but it's not bad at all: intelligent, workmanlike, and often funny." The Economist opined, "This is a novel of insight and skill, deftly drawn and, at the end, cleverly pulled together. It plays to her strengths as a storyteller." David Robinson of The Scotsman praised the novel, saying, "It is far grittier, bleaker (and, occasionally, funnier) than I had expected, and—the acid test—I suspect it would do well even if its author's name weren't J.K. Rowling." The Telegraph lauded the novel as well, writing, "One marvels at the skill with which Rowling weaves such vivid characters in and out of each other's lives, rendering them so complex and viscerally believable that one finds oneself caring for the worst of them." Further positive reviews have come from reviewers for the Associated Press, Express.co.uk, The Daily Mirror, The Kansas City Star, The New Zealand Herald and the Daily Beast, the latter remarked that the book was a "page turner."

The New York Times' Michiko Kakutani panned the novel, comparing it unfavourably to Rowling's Harry Potter series and saying, "We do not come away feeling that we know the back stories of the 'Vacancy' characters in intimate detail the way we did with Harry and his friends and enemies, nor do we finish the novel with a visceral knowledge of how their pasts—and their families' pasts—have informed their present lives." The Los Angeles Times criticised the book, stating that it "fails to conjure Harry Potter's magic." The Daily Telegraph maintained the novel was humorous but said "The novel pretty much explodes towards the end, losing shape in its fury at the dirty, unfair England that we Muggles have made for ourselves. It's like The Archers on amyl nitrate." The Times said "The difficulty, in this fat novel, is the difference between the reader's level of interest in a wholly invented world, such as Harry Potter's, and the world we're stuck with. Rowling has a sharp eye for vivid details, and there are passages of very good writing in this book... But her fictions have little shadow in them."

=== Sales, awards and honours ===
Within hours of the book's release, it had reached Number 1 position on the Amazon Book Chart in the United States. It was the second biggest adult opening of all time in the United Kingdom, falling short of Dan Brown's 2009 novel, The Lost Symbol, which sold 550,946 copies. It also fell short of Rowling's last release, Harry Potter and the Deathly Hallows, that sold 2.6 million copies and became the fastest-selling book in history. It became the 15th best-selling book of 2012 during its first week of release. Little, Brown and Company has announced that within the first three weeks the book's total sales had topped one million copies in English in all formats across all territories, including the US and the UK.

The book won the Best Fiction category in the Goodreads Choice Awards 2012.

=== Portrayal of Sikhism ===
A Sikh family plays an important part in the novel, and the description of the character Sukhvinder sparked some controversy amongst followers of the Sikh faith. Avtar Singh Makkar, the head of India's Shiromani Gurdwara Parbandhak Committee, commented that Rowling's book would be examined by the scrutiny board of SGPC for anything objectionable. Rowling stated that she admires the Sikh religion and had done a vast amount of research on Sikhism. Other members of the Sikh community appreciated the fact that Rowling portrayed Sikhs and Sikhism in a favourable light and actually draws attention to discriminations faced by Sikhs.

== Adaptation ==
On 3 December 2012, BBC One and BBC Drama commissioned an adaptation of The Casual Vacancy. It was a joint production with US channel HBO. Filming began in August 2014. In 2015, the adaptation was broadcast on BBC One, as 3 one-hour segments. Warner Bros. is serving as the worldwide TV distributor of the series, except in the United Kingdom.

Some aspects of the story were modified for the TV adaptation. For example, the controversial decision to be made by the parish council was changed from closing a methadone clinic, to closing a country house bequeathed to the village as a public amenity by a rich philanthropist, and replacing it with a spa. Most significantly, Krystal Weedon is portrayed as drowning trying to save her brother Robbie, rather than committing suicide by overdose after failing to save him.
