= Doctor Who: The Adventure Games =

- Developer: Sumo Digital
- Publishers: BBC Wales Interactive; Legacy Games (Steam)
- Director: Sean Millard
- Writers: Phil Ford; James Moran
- Composer: Murray Gold
- Series: Doctor Who
- Engine: Emmersion
- Platforms: Microsoft Windows, Mac OS
- Release: 5 June 2010—31 October 2011
- Genre: Graphic adventure
- Mode: Single-player

Doctor Who: The Adventure Games was an episodic adventure video game based on the BBC television series Doctor Who and developed by Sumo Digital.

Each episode was made available for free download to residents of the UK via the BBC's official Doctor Who website; a UK internet address was required to both download and install them, though the games subsequently were made available for international sale. The first one was released on 5 June 2010, the second one on 26 June 2010, the third on 27 August 2010, the fourth on 22 December 2010, and the fifth on 31 October 2011. In February 2012, the BBC announced they had shelved the games in favour of worldwide console games such as Doctor Who: The Eternity Clock. At the end of May 2017, the game was made no longer available to purchase on the Steam platform.

== Production ==
The games were commissioned by Simon Nelson and Rosie Allimonos of BBC Vision. Phil Ford was selected to write because of his experience in writing for Doctor Who and The Sarah Jane Adventures, including writing the Dreamland animated Doctor Who serial.

Phil Ford and James Moran wrote the scripts. The games were created by Sumo Digital with Will Tarratt as lead designer. Composer of the revived series of Doctor Who, Murray Gold, provided music for The Adventure Games. Executive producers of the 2010 series of the show Steven Moffat, Piers Wenger, and Beth Willis, along with BBC Wales Interactive's Anwen Aspden and video game designer Charles Cecil, all served as executive producers of the interactive episodes. Producer and voice director was Gary Russell who had previously directed the animated serials The Infinite Quest and Dreamland.

As of January 2012, The Adventure Games have been shelved, with the BBC instead focusing on projects such as The Eternity Clock.

On 17 May 2014, the series with its five games was released on Steam, published by Legacy Games.

In October 2015, the games became unavailable from the BBC website.

At the end of May 2017, the series was removed from Steam, due to an expiration of Legacy Games' licence with the BBC.

== Episodes ==
1. All 5 adventure games are released in a 5 Pack PC DVD set and sold on Amazon.

=== Series 1 ===
No	Episode	Writer	Release date(s)	Link
1	"City of the Daleks"	Phil Ford	5 June 2010 (Outside UK) / 15 June 2010 (UK)	link
In an alternate 1963, the Daleks have control of time and the TARDIS arrives in the ruins of London. Before time runs out for Amy Pond, a trip must be made to the planet of Skaro.
2	"Blood of the Cybermen"	Phil Ford	26 June 2010 (Outside UK) / 1 July 2010 (UK)	link
In the Arctic a survey team are turning into metal. An army of Cybermen have been under the ice for thousands of years.
3	"TARDIS"	James Moran	27 August 2010	link
Amid an accident in the TARDIS Amy's attempts to rescue the Doctor unwittingly unleash the creature known only as the Entity.
4	"Shadows of the Vashta Nerada"	Phil Ford	22 December 2010	link
A temporal rift means that the Doctor and Amy have to deal with an alien shark, alien radiation and worst of all, the Vashta Nerada on Poseidon 8, an underwater base on Christmas Eve in the 23rd Century.

=== Series 2 ===
No	Episode	Writer	Release date(s)	Link
5	"The Gunpowder Plot"	Phil Ford	31 October 2011	link
The Doctor, Amy and Rory travel from the end of the Liao dynasty, forward to Jacobian London in 1605. There they unearth a conflict between two opposing alien races, the Sontarans and the Rutans, and meet Guy Fawkes during the time of the Gunpowder Plot.

== Cast and characters ==
=== Playable characters ===
Rotoscope technique was used to capture the actors' movements.

- Matt Smith as the Eleventh Doctor (series 1–2)
- Karen Gillan as Amy Pond (series 1–2)
- Arthur Darvill as Rory Williams (series 2 only)

=== Others ===
==== Series 1 ====
- Nicholas Briggs as Dalek Voices ("City of the Daleks") / Cyber Voices ("Blood of the Cybermen") / Oswald Fox ("Shadows of the Vashta Nerada"). He has voiced the Daleks and Cybermen since the revival of Doctor Who in 2005. He has also voiced the Judoon and appeared as Rick Yates in "Day Four" of Torchwood: Children of Earth.
- Sara Carver as Sylvia ("City of the Daleks"). She previously starred as Khellian Queen in the Fifth Doctor audio adventure "Three's a Crowd" and as Kim Kronotska in the Eighth Doctor audio adventure "Memory Lane". She has also voiced other characters in numerous Doctor Who-related audio dramas produced by Big Finish.
- Sarah Douglas as Professor Meadows ("Blood of the Cybermen") / Entity ("TARDIS") / Jones ("Shadows of the Vashta Nerada"). She had previously played Gillen in the Doctor Who Unbound audio drama "Masters of War", Mary in the Iris Wildthyme audio drama "The Claws of Santa", and later appeared in the fourth series of Gallifrey.
- Barnaby Edwards as Chisholm ("Blood of the Cybermen") / Martin Flanagan ("Shadows of the Vashta Nerada"). He has directed, written, and provided voices for various Big Finish Doctor Who audios, and is also a principal Dalek operator in the television series.
- Eleanor Matsuura as Dana Tanaka ("Shadows of the Vashta Nerada"). She previously played Jo Nakashima in "The Sontaran Stratagem".

==== "The Gunpowder Plot" ====
- Emilia Fox as Lady Winters. She previously played Berenice in the Eighth Doctor audio drama "Nevermore".
- Ralf Little as Guy Fawkes
- Phil Daniels as Geoffrey Plum
- Alexander Vlahos as Robert Catesby
- Dan Starkey as Field Major Kaarsh / Sontarans
- Miles Richardson as Black Rod
- David Ames as Thomas Percy
- Lizzie Hopley as Alice Flowers. She previously appeared in the Seventh Doctor audio drama "Night Thoughts" as Sue, the Eighth Doctor audio drama "Terror Firma" as Gemma Griffin, and in I, Davros as Yarvell.
- Jamie Oram as Charlie
- Chris Johnson as Barnaby. He previously appeared in the fourth series of Gallifrey and in Bernice Summerfield: Epoch as Darion.
- Amelda Brown as Margaret
- Barnaby Edwards as The Silence

== Plots ==
=== City of the Daleks ===
The Doctor and Amy arrive in Trafalgar Square, London in 1963 to find the city in ruins and under the control of the Daleks. Following a woman, Sylvia, into the London Underground they learn that she is the only human survivor after the Daleks invaded – appearing through a 'split' in the sky. Amy, Sylvia, and the Doctor are pursued by the Daleks. Sylvia is killed but the Doctor and Amy escape. The Doctor deduces that the Daleks have gained the power to alter history and, returning to the TARDIS with Amy, traces the source of the invasion to Skaro, the Daleks' home planet. The TARDIS lands in Kaalann, the Dalek capital city, which has been rebuilt since the Doctor last saw it. Amy begins to fade, since the destruction of humanity in 1963 means that she was never born. The Doctor uses several Dalek components to create a "Chronon Blocker", which slows the process. The Doctor and Amy observe the Dalek Council Chamber. They see the Dalek Emperor, as well as a device which the Doctor believes to be the technology that allows the Daleks to manipulate history. The Doctor and Amy are captured by Daleks and taken before the Emperor. The Emperor explains that the Daleks will become the new Time Lords with control over the Time Vortex, through the use of the "Eye of Time", a powerful tool previously kept on Gallifrey. The Doctor escapes with Amy by leaping into the Eye which transports them back in time to an earlier ruined Kaalann which is infested with Varga plants just prior to the arrival of the Daleks with the Eye.

The Doctor sends Amy to find components that he can use to create a device that will blind the Daleks. Despite beginning to fade once more, Amy finds the parts and the Doctor constructs the device. In the Council Chamber, the Daleks, led by the white Supreme Dalek, are preparing to use the Eye to launch an attack on Earth in 1963. Amy, still fading, activates the blinding device affecting the Daleks. This allows the Doctor to free the Eye from its restraints and to flee the room with Amy. The Eye crashes down and explodes and the Doctor and Amy find themselves back at the TARDIS, but with Kaalann still in ruins. Amy is no longer fading out of existence. Using the TARDIS scanner, they see that the original 1963 timeline has been restored and that Sylvia is alive.

=== Blood of the Cybermen ===
A number of flashbacks show an excavation of an arctic base. A worker at the base called Chisholm flees from the base on a Snowmobile where he finds a Cyberman arm. Chisholm falls off a cliff and gets badly hurt. The Doctor receives an SOS call to which he responds, landing where Chisholm fell. The Doctor and Amy rescue Chisholm and use the TARDIS to go back to Chisholm's base.

Upon arrival Chisholm is attacked by a Cybermat, causing him to flee and hide. The Doctor goes to the base entrance where he encounters a Cyberslave. After Amy kills the Cyberslave they enter the base. The head of the operation, Professor Meadows (voiced by Sarah Douglas), tells them that all of her crew have been turned into Cyberslaves. The Doctor starts on a serum to reverse the effects of the Cyberman conversion. To reach the communications room they have to get past Cybermats and then a Cyberslave which tries to kill Amy. The Doctor and Amy hear over the radio that a team is coming to the base, however they cannot be warned until the radio is repaired. The Doctor develops a cure which they give to the part-changed Chisholm. Chisholm shows them a lift which they use to go underground.

Trying to get to the control room the Doctor and Amy have to get around Cyberslaves. However, Amy is kidnapped by two Cyberslaves. The Doctor reaches the control room where he finds Professor Meadows is now a Cyberslave. She forces the Doctor to revive the Cybermen from stasis to save Amy. The Doctor saves Amy but he needs to stop the Cybermen. The intervention of Chisholm allows him to do this and they escape from underground before an explosion destroys everything. The Doctor and Amy leave Chisholm behind so he can answer any questions that UNIT might have. After that the Cybermen are seen frozen on ice.

=== TARDIS ===
The Doctor and Amy are inside the TARDIS, discussing where they should go next for a more peaceful outing, and the Doctor mentions that his holidays in Brighton and Paris did not turn out well (alluding to The Leisure Hive and City of Death respectively). However, the TARDIS suddenly enters a 'space riptide', and the Doctor is launched through the doors and out into space.

After the TARDIS steadies itself, Amy looks outside and sees the Doctor hovering, still conscious and surrounded by a number of strange blue worms, a short distance away. Through sign language, he manages to tell Amy that he is slowly suffocating, and she can save him by operating the TARDIS. Amy follows his directions and recovers the Doctor by using a makeshift tractor beam to draw him back into the TARDIS. The blue worms, known as 'Chronomites', are somewhat harmless parasites, although they can make you 'very itchy'.

Just as they begin to celebrate their victory, the TARDIS enters another riptide, and Amy disappears. Amy is now in the Doctor's future with a strange glowing sphere that she had accidentally released from its prison in the TARDIS. The Doctor brings himself and Amy back into the same time and deals with the creature, the "Entity", by releasing it into the vortex so that it can feed on the Chronomites while the Chronomites feed on it, the two keeping each other contained.

The Doctor plans to take Amy to 23rd century London just after a 'Great Flood', but finds that the underwater city is being prowled by a gigantic shark-like creature.

=== Shadows of the Vashta Nerada ===
The episode begins with the Doctor and Amy being stalked through the underwater city (from the end of the previous episode) by an enormous shark-like creature known as a 'Zaralok'. The two make their way through a series of tunnels while the Zaralok tries to ram its way in; while they manage to escape, the Zaralok destroys one of the tunnels, separating them from the TARDIS. They head over to the city's central building, Poseidon Eight, where they are greeted by an oceanographer called Martin. The Doctor explains to Amy how sea levels rose dramatically, causing the entire human race to rebuild on higher land. However, underwater cities like this one, Poseidon, were built in order to harvest resources from the ocean floor. He also notes how the Zaralok is obviously not indigenous to Earth, and must have somehow relocated from another world.

Martin explains how Poseidon's workers have been suffering from some form of disease, and how Jones, the intelligent computer monitoring Poseidon, has been forced to place the crew under quarantine. Martin then takes the Doctor and Amy to meet Dana, the crew's medic, and Oswald, the captain. Before they are able to explain any more about the situation, the lights go out due to a generator malfunction; when they come back on, Martin's flesh has been eaten away from his skeleton inside his diving suit. The Doctor realises that Poseidon has also been infested by Vashta Nerada.

The Doctor and Amy travel through Poseidon's tunnels, while still being stalked by the Zaralok, in order to reach the generator and switch the lights back on. After evading a pair of divers, now dead and re-animated by the Vashta Nerada, they succeed and head back to meet Oswald. The Doctor explains how he found a radiation detector on one of the diving suits which has picked up a form of radiation that Jones was unable to identify. The Doctor believes the radiation is of alien origin and he knows how to create a cure to stop it; however, Oswald is reluctant to let him back out into the tunnels to find the required ingredients. He instead intends to send everybody up to the surface in safety pods – a bad idea, as they would surely be destroyed by the Zaralok. Oswald still refuses to let them out, and closes off the city outside Poseidon Eight.

The Doctor convinces Dana to reopen the tunnels; she also gives away that the Zaralok, the Vashta Nerada and the radiation all seemed to appear after a flash of light a short distance away from Poseidon only a few days ago. After getting back out into Poseidon, the Doctor finds the ingredients for the cure (simply numerous types of vegetation from the seabed) and heads back to Dana's lab. He manages to create the cure and heal Dana, who was starting to suffer from the radiation, but Oswald enters with a harpoon gun and threatens the Doctor to back off so that he and Dana can evacuate Poseidon. Oswald leaves with Dana, while the Doctor and Amy find Jones and use its scanners to identify the source of the light Dana mentioned. Jones' scanners pick up a shipwreck a short distance away; the Doctor identifies it as the USS Eldridge, a ship constructed by the USA during the WWII era. The Americans had attempted to give the ship cloaking technology and had asked Albert Einstein for help, but they accidentally opened a wormhole which the ship then jumped through into another world. After being there for centuries, the ship then jumped back through another wormhole and landed outside Poseidon, but the hole is still open and has allowed the creatures as well as the radiation to come through.

Jones helps the Doctor and Amy to get back to the TARDIS via a series of safety tunnels built beneath the main ones. They then travel to the Eldridge, seeking to close the wormhole. The Doctor believes that closing the gap will bring everything that came through back as well. The two make their way to the Accelerator room, which is at the heart of the gap. Amy makes her way to the top, followed by the Doctor, who survives a close encounter with the Vashta Nerada. After they reach the controls which can close the wormhole, the Zaralok, which is apparently aware of their intentions, attacks the Eldridge, and begins to smash its way into the Accelerator. Just before it reaches them, the Doctor finishes the process, and the Zaralok is dragged back through the wormhole along with the Vashta Nerada and the disease.

Back at Poseidon Eight, Oswald apologises for his earlier behaviour, saying how he only wished to protect his people. He then offers for the Doctor and Amy to join them for Christmas dinner, an offer they decide to run from when they find that the main course is a helping of Oswald's prize crop – 'Sea Pumpkin'.

=== The Gunpowder Plot ===
While leaving China after trying to get a takeaway, the TARDIS collides with an alien ship, creating a dimensional lesion inside the ship that links the TARDIS to an alien planet. After the Doctor accidentally drops the sonic screwdriver into the rift and Rory recovers it, they trace the ship that they collided with and discover that it is under London in the seventeenth century. While the Doctor works on a device to close the lesions in the TARDIS, Amy and Rory explore the sewers where they have landed, and discover that they have arrived at the time of the Gunpowder Plot, where Rory is puzzled at the presence of 'Lady Winters', a mysterious woman in green, in the conspiracy. When Amy follows Lady Winters while Rory tries to return to the Doctor, she discovers that Lady Winters is actually a Rutan, but is only just saved from an attack when the Doctor opens a lesion to her location and drives the Rutan away.

While trying to return to the Doctor, Rory discovers a squad of Sontarans are also under London, searching for the crashed Rutan ship, but he is able to escape using a catapult to strike the Sontarans' vents. With the Doctor now aware that they are dealing with a crashed Rutan ship underneath Parliament, he infiltrates the Gunpowder Plot to monitor their progress while Amy and Rory track down the ship, discovering a control room with a strange spherical device and a slot where a second one should be, but a child who followed them down there steals the sphere. Confronting Lady Winters, the Doctor learns that the Rutan ship is damaged and requires the energy of the explosion to escape its position under Parliament unless missing control rods – indestructible components that were lost when the ship crashed – are recovered, and that the Rutan ship holds a doomsday weapon that could end the Sontaran–Rutan war.

Although Amy manages to find the missing components, the Doctor is only just able to save Parliament by using the lesions to teleport Parliament into space, although he and his companions are forced to search the Houses when they learn that both doomsday weapons are there. With Rory armed with a sound blaster that can disorient the Rutans, they manage to escape pursuit and find the weapons, which the Doctor realises are genetic bombs that could wipe out all of one race if activated. Reprogramming one, the Doctor randomly tosses both weapons to the Sontarans and the Rutans, noting that it is now impossible for either of them to set the weapons off as they have no way of knowing if their weapon will destroy their enemies or themselves. In the end, the Doctor, Amy and Rory leave Guy Fawkes trapped with the barrels of gunpowder and return to the future to watch Bonfire Night fireworks.

== Continuity ==
=== City of the Daleks ===
- Varga plants previously appeared in the First Doctor-era episode "Mission to the Unknown" and were created by Dalek creator Terry Nation.
- One of the items needed is a Kontron Crystal, which appeared in the serial Timelash.
- The Beatles previously appeared in The Chase as the First Doctor and his companions watched the band perform "Ticket to Ride" on the Time-Space Visualiser.
- The Doctor mentions Cathy Gale, a character from the TV series The Avengers. Honor Blackman, who played the character, starred as Professor Lasky in the Sixth Doctor story The Trial of a Time Lord and also Anahita in the Fifth Doctor audio drama The Children of Seth.

=== Blood of the Cybermen ===
- Amy says the Cybermats are worse than spiders, to which the Doctor replies "Spiders? I'd rather we changed the subject". His fear of spiders is established in the Third Doctor story Planet of the Spiders.
- This story conflicts with the episode The Pandorica Opens, in which Amy does not know what Cybermen are. However, an unseen crack in time may have erased this event too.

=== TARDIS ===
- Amy asks the Doctor to name one of his holidays which did not end in a disaster and the Doctor recalls Brighton Beach. In the Fourth Doctor story The Leisure Hive K-9 exploded while visiting Brighton with the Doctor. The Doctor also mentions Paris, where he visits in City of Death.
- The Laser Screwdriver which the Master used in "The Sound of Drums" / "Last of the Time Lords" is used by Amy to assemble the Tractor Beam.
- The TARDIS study room contains the following items: a Dalek eye stalk, a book about the Weeping Angels ("The Time of Angels"), the Second Doctor's recorder, the Chronon Blocker from "City of the Daleks", a map of medieval Venice ("The Vampires of Venice"), Liz Ten's facemask ("The Beast Below"), the fob watch and Journal of Impossible Things from "Human Nature", a parallel universe Cyberman chestpiece, Rassilon's Time Lord staff ("The End of Time"), a Sycorax staff ("The Christmas Invasion"), a gramophone seen in the TV Movie, a cricket ball that belonged to the Fifth Doctor, the sonic blaster used by Jack Harkness ("The Doctor Dances") and River Song ("Silence in the Library" / "Forest of the Dead"), an Ood translator, the Fourth Doctor's scarf, and the distress beacon from "Blood of the Cybermen".
- The TARDIS' drawing room was last seen in the TV Movie.

=== Shadows of the Vashta Nerada ===
- When the Eleventh Doctor and Amy are tied up with rope, they escape using the same trick Harry Houdini taught the Doctor that the Tenth Doctor used in animated serial Dreamland.
- The Doctor previously fought the Vashta Nerada in the episodes "Silence in the Library" and "Forest of the Dead".

=== The Gunpowder Plot ===
- The Rutans and the Rutan Host first appeared in the Fourth Doctor story The Horror of Fang Rock.
- The novel The Plotters depicts the Doctor meeting Guy Fawkes in his first incarnation.
- A few of the aliens who work for the Silence can be seen when wandering around London.
- When in the TARDIS' drawing room, some additional features are present, including the Doctor's cot (As seen in A Good Man Goes to War).

== Marketing ==
On 7 April 2010, the game was first announced on the official Doctor Who BBC website. It included a brief description of what was to come as well as 13 in-game pictures.

The first episode was scheduled to be available on 5 June, But a 'not quite final' version was available 3 days early. The Mac version was released on 15 June.

On 17 June, Simon Nelson, controller of portfolio and multiplatform at BBC Vision told games magazine MCV that the number of downloads of the first episode had already exceeded half a million. "The result is a lot more than I was expecting, We had set ourselves some fairly stretched targets on this and we’ve blown them away", he says.

To promote the second episode "Blood of the Cybermen", Steven Moffat and Nicholas Briggs went to Gavinburn Primary School in Scotland and to the Pacific Quay in Glasgow.

To coincide with the airing of "The Big Bang" in the US on 24 July on BBC America and Space, the Windows versions of the first two episodes were made available to purchase outside the UK via Direct2Drive.; the Mac OS versions of the games, however, were never made available for sale; although it was announced that the remaining games likewise would be made available for sale, as of mid-2014 this has yet to happen.

On 20 September 2010, a second series was commissioned for 2011. BBC's head of multiplatform in vision Simon Nelson says "Given the success of the first series, we'd be daft not to recomission. But it's not just about the numbers; the feedback we've had has been overwhelmingly positive."

== Reception ==
Despite an overwhelmingly positive reaction from fans, the first episode of the series titled "City of The Daleks" received mixed reviews from critics. Joe Keeley from Adventure Gamers gave the game 2.5/5 stars stating "Fans of the show are likely to get some kicks controlling the Doctor and Amy, but the gameplay is far too simple and repetitive to hold up as an enjoyable interactive experience".

As the series continued, the critical reaction became more positive with both "Blood of The Cybermen" and "Shadows of The Vashta Nerada" receiving positive reviews. However, "TARDIS" received criticism for its short length and uninspired story.

The intended first episode of a second series of Adventure Games titled "The Gunpowder Plot" received positive reviews from critics, with many citing it as a major improvement over the previous episodes as well as praising its length, engaging story, and sense of exploration.
