= Dalek Emperor =

Dalek Emperor may refer to one of several characters in the long-running British science fiction television series Doctor Who:

- Emperor Dalek, from The Evil of the Daleks
- Dalek Emperor, from Remembrance of the Daleks, really Davros
- Dalek Emperor, from The Parting of the Ways
- Dalek Emperor, from City of the Daleks
