= The Time of Angels =

Episode of Doctor Who

206a – "The Time of Angels"
- Doctor Who episode

Cast
- Doctor: Matt Smith – Eleventh Doctor
- Companion: Karen Gillan – Amy Pond
- Others: Alex Kingston – River Song; Simon Dutton – Alistair; Mike Skinner – Security Guard; Iain Glen – Father Octavian; Mark Springer – Christian; Troy Glasgow – Angelo; David Atkins – Bob; Darren Morfitt – Marco

Production
- Directed by: Adam Smith
- Written by: Steven Moffat
- Produced by: Tracie Simpson
- Executive producers: Steven Moffat; Piers Wenger; Beth Willis
- Music by: Murray Gold
- Production code: 1.4
- Series: Series 5
- Running time: 1st of 2-part story, 45 minutes
- First broadcast: 24 April 2010

Chronology
← Preceded by "Victory of the Daleks"	Followed by → "Flesh and Stone"

"The Time of Angels" is the fourth episode of the fifth series of the British science fiction television series Doctor Who, which was first broadcast on 24 April 2010 on BBC One. It is the first episode of a two-part story written by showrunner Steven Moffat and directed by Adam Smith; the second episode, "Flesh and Stone", aired on 1 May. Moffat utilised the two-part episode to bring back a couple of his previous creations: the Weeping Angels from his series 3 episode "Blink", and River Song (Alex Kingston) from the series 4 episodes "Silence in the Library" and "Forest of the Dead".

The episode is partly set in the 51st century. In the episode, the Eleventh Doctor—a time travelling alien played by Matt Smith—and his companion Amy Pond (Karen Gillan) are summoned by River Song, a mysterious woman from the Doctor's future. She takes them to the planet Alfava Metraxis, where the spaceship Byzantium has crashed. Hidden inside is a Weeping Angel, a creature that can only move when unobserved by others. With the help of Father Octavian (Iain Glen) and his militarised clerics, the Doctor, Amy and River Song travel through a stone labyrinth to reach the ship. On the way, they discover that all the statues in the maze are Angels, which are slowly restoring and planning to trap them in the labyrinth.

Inspired by the relationship between the film Alien and its sequel, Aliens, Moffat wrote the episode as a more action-oriented sequel to "Blink". It was the first episode to be filmed in the series; filming began 20 July 2009 at Southerndown beach, Vale of Glamorgan which was used as the surface of Alfava Metraxis. The episode was watched by 8.59 million viewers in the United Kingdom, received the highest Appreciation Index given to the fifth series at time of broadcast and was acclaimed by critics as one of the best episodes of the series.

== Plot ==
The Eleventh Doctor and Amy find a plea of help from Dr River Song for the Doctor engraved in the Time Lords' language on the flight recorder of the starship Byzantium 12,000 years prior, currently housed in a museum. They travel back in time, and rescue River before the Byzantium crashes on the planet Alfava Metraxis. On the planet's surface, the Doctor realises that while he has only met River once before, (Note: As depicted in the 2008 episodes "Silence in the Library" and "Forest of the Dead".) she has met him several times before. River explains that the Byzantium holds a Weeping Angel in its cargo. She contacts Father Octavian and his militarised clerics to help capture it to protect a large population of human colonists elsewhere on the planet.

As the clerics set up base camp, River accesses footage of the Angel from the Byzantium to verify that it is secure. She and the Doctor leave to study a text written about the Angels, learning that even an image of an Angel can become an Angel itself. They are unaware that Amy stayed to watch the footage, and when she blinks, the Angel appears to move. The Doctor helps her stop the video feed, and believes Amy is safe, but she feels something in her eye.

Father Octavian orders them to set out through a system of catacombs to reach the Byzantium, using a gravity globe to illuminate the cave. The Doctor and River comment on the various statues they pass, believing they are made by the planet's extinct natives, until they recall the natives are two-headed beings and the statues are only single-headed. They conclude they must be weakened Angels, and that the Angel on the Byzantium purposely crashed the ship here to rescue its kind, reviving an entire army by flooding the catacombs with radiation. The Angels start to pursue the group. Amy finds that she cannot move, and the Doctor realises that the image of the Angel still exists in her eye and is making her believe this; he bites her wrist to prove she is still mobile, and they continue to flee.

An Angel snaps the necks of the rear guard, and more Angels trap the survivors at the highest point of the cave, right underneath the hull of the Byzantium. The Doctor says they never should have trapped him, tells the others to prepare to jump, and shoots the gravity globe.

== Production ==
=== Writing ===
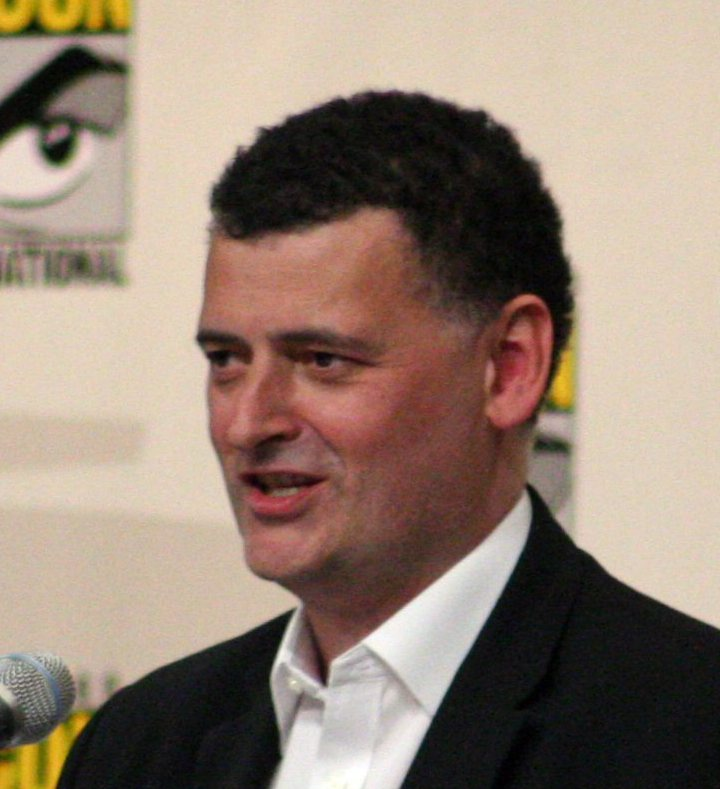
Writer Steven Moffat intended for the episode to be a more action-oriented sequel to "Blink".

The episode was written by lead writer and executive producer Steven Moffat. He designed the two-part episode as a more action-oriented sequel to "Blink", an episode he had written for the third series. He compared the relationship to the film Alien and its sequel Aliens, with the former being more low-key and the latter more "highly coloured". Moffat thought that Aliens was "the best conceived movie sequel ever" and decided to use it as a model. He also intended to portray the Angels and their actions differently; in "Blink" they were barely surviving and resembled scavengers, while in "The Time of Angels" he wanted them to have a plan that could become "almost like a war". The two-part story was intended to show the worst possible instance that could occur with the Weeping Angels, which was the inability to see, as explored in the second part, "Flesh and Stone", when Amy must keep her eyes closed. Executive producer Piers Wenger thought that the Delirium Archive, the museum the Doctor and Amy visited at the beginning of the episode, needed to be explained, therefore Moffat named it "the final resting place of the Headless Monks" and sent it to him via text message. The Headless Monks themselves appeared in the mid-series finale of the next series, "A Good Man Goes to War".

Moffat also brought back the character of River Song from his fourth series episodes "Silence in the Library" and "Forest of the Dead". In the former, River asks the Doctor if he had done the "crash of the Byzantium" with her yet. Actress Alex Kingston did not expect the return, but stated that Moffat "always intended that she would come back". Moffat was influenced by Audrey Niffenegger's novel, The Time Traveler's Wife, in which a woman falls in love with a man who unintentionally moves through time. Moffat used this inspiration in his episode "The Girl in the Fireplace", but Alex Kingston, as well as reviewers have compared River to The Time Traveler's Wife.

=== Filming and effects ===
"The Time of Angels" was the first episode of the series to be produced. The read-through for the episode took place on 15 July 2009. Filming began on 20 July 2009 on Southerndown beach, Vale of Glamorgan, which was used as the surface of Alfava Metraxis. Torrential rain halted filming the following day, and about three pages of the script were never filmed, including the scene Gillan had read for her audition. The gap was replaced by the scene of River flying the TARDIS after the Byzantium, which was filmed as a pick-up. Steven Moffat later reflected on the replacement being "a lovely scene, and a much better start to the show". During the CGI shot of the TARDIS flying through the Time Vortex in that scene, an older TARDIS model from the David Tennant era was accidentally used instead of the new one.

Director Adam Smith, new to Doctor Who, felt pressure in making the episode a worthy sequel to "Blink", which he called a "brilliant, brilliant, brilliant episode", but also said that it was great to work with the Weeping Angels. He decided to have the interaction between the Doctor and River Song resemble that of an old married couple, bickering like "mum and dad arguing over directions in the car". Actress Alex Kingston stated that it was "great fun" on set and she enjoyed working with Matt Smith, although her relationship with Smith was different from his predecessor and her former co-star, David Tennant. In the script it was not written in that River would land on the Doctor when she flew into the TARDIS; it was an idea that Matt Smith came up with in rehearsal that proved difficult to film. In the episode, there is a moment in the viewing room where the Doctor hangs on a strap attached to the ceiling and it breaks. This was originally an accident during one of the takes, but director Adam Smith liked it and filmed it again, with Matt Smith doing it on purpose.

Most of the Weeping Angels are not statue props but young women wearing masks, costumes, and paint that took two to three hours to apply. Adam Smith called them "an absolute nightmare to film with" because it took a long time for them to get ready and they had to stand still for long periods of time. Smith wished River Song's entrance to be a shocking surprise to the audience. A stunt double was used for some shots of the scene where River flies out of the Byzantium's airlock, but Kingston wished to do some of it herself. The scene was filmed on a greenscreen with Kingston hooked up on wires that pulled her up and backwards as a wind machine was blown to create the effect of the airlock. Kingston said she "absolutely loved" filming the scene. For the scene in which sand pours out of Amy's eye as she rubs it, an eye patch containing sand that would be released when Gillan rubbed it was placed over her eye.

== Broadcast and reception ==
"The Time of Angels" was first broadcast on BBC One on Saturday, 24 April 2010 from 6:20 p.m. to 7:05 p.m. In the United States it was shown on sister station BBC America on 8 May 2010. In the UK, preliminary overnight viewing figures showed that 6.8 million viewers watched the episode, which made it second for the night behind Britain's Got Talent. This was also the second highest overnight figure for a fourth episode over the last five series, "The Girl in the Fireplace" taking the top position. When final consolidated ratings were calculated, another 1.81 million timeshifted viewers were added, bringing the total up to 8.59 million, the highest viewing figure for the series since "The Eleventh Hour". This made it the fifth most watched programme on BBC One and the 12th most watched across all UK TV channels for the week ending 25 April 2010. It was also given an Appreciation Index of 87, the highest for the fifth series so far at its time of broadcast.

=== Banner incident ===
The offending banner

During the cliffhanger ending of the first broadcast of "The Time of Angels", an animated graphic was shown in some regions, showing Graham Norton revealing a banner trailing his show Over the Rainbow. According to the BBC, the overlay graphic was run 20 seconds too early. The BBC apologised after receiving over five thousand complaints. The incident received attention on Twitter, with SFX magazine reporting that it had "caused a minor Twitter earthquake", citing tweets from Charlie Brooker, Matthew Graham and Simon Pegg. The incident was lampooned on Brooker's panel game You Have Been Watching, where he described it as "a travesty". BBC drama writer and co-creator of Life on Mars and Ashes to Ashes Matthew Graham criticised the BBC for "cheapen[ing]" itself and mentioned he wrote emails to "a few interested parties".

Graham Norton himself went on to parody the incident in his own show by placing a similar banner at the bottom of the screen and having a Dalek exterminate his own cartoon caricature. Norton also had an adverse effect in some regions on the broadcast of "Rose", with his voice being heard in the opening minutes.

=== Critical reception ===
The episode received widespread acclaim from television critics. Daniel Martin, writing for The Guardian, called it "an astonishing achievement" and "absolutely bloody terrifying". He praised the way Moffat handled River Song's story, as well as for making it an "intricate romp jammed with ideas that make a truly cinematic piece of drama". Gavin Fuller's review for The Daily Telegraph praised the suspense and "the revelation that all the statues were Angels" which he called "genuinely shocking". Though he commented it "took a while to get going", once it did he thought it had turned into the "first genuine chiller" of the series. He wrote that the "only real disappointment" was the "inference that the TARDIS doesn't really have to make its celebrated 'vworp, vworp' noise on landing", asking "How can you do that to us long-time fans, Steven Moffat – that sound is part of the warp and weft of the programme!".

Patrick Mulkern, writing for the Radio Times, described the episode as "simply superb television" and claimed that "Matt Smith really is shaping up to be the best Doctor since Tom Baker", praising him for being "simultaneously intense and subtle". He thought it started out with "arguably the most impressive opener to any Doctor Who yet" and also praised Amy for being "cheerfully free of the emotional baggage that mired her predecessors" so far. Matt Wales of IGN gave the episode a 10 out of 10 rating, calling it "huge, silly, scary, gorgeous, gripping and – most importantly – fun". Although he wrote it "never quite matched the relentless tension of 'Blink'", he commented that it was "flawlessly paced and, when it mattered, genuinely scary". Unlike Fuller, he praised the TARDIS "vworp vworp" joke, asking "Who could possibly not love the sheer audacity in suggesting the TARDIS's iconic whirring noise was the result of the Doctor leaving the brakes on for the last 45 years?"

SFX magazine reviewer Dave Golder gave the episode five out of five stars, praising it for being "superbly paced, the changes in tone happening gradually and organically". He also commended the directing and sound effects. Keith Phipps of The A.V. Club gave the episode a grade of A−, praising the scary atmosphere and the development of the Weeping Angels. He commented that he was a little "fuzzy" on the Doctor and River Song's relationship, but he expected that he was supposed to be.

== Home media ==
A Region 2 DVD and Blu-ray containing "The Time of Angels" together with the following episodes "Flesh and Stone" and "The Vampires of Venice" was released on 5 July 2010. It was re-released as part of the complete series five DVD on 8 November 2010.

=== In print ===
The Time of Angels
- Author: Trevor Baxendale
- Series: Doctor Who novelisations
- Publisher: Pearson Education
- Publication date: May 2011
- ISBN: 978-1408274132

The Time of Angels
- Author: Jenny T. Colgan
- Series: Doctor Who book: Target novelisations
- Publisher: BBC Books
- Publication date: 26 March 2026
- ISBN: 978-1785949982

Pearson Education published a novelisation of this episode and "Flesh and Stone" under the title The Time of Angels by Trevor Baxendale for school literacy programs in May 2011. BBC Books published a novelisation of this episode and "Flesh and Stone" written by Jenny T. Colgan as a paperback, ebook, and an audiobook on 26 March 2026 under the title The Time of Angels as part of the Target Collection.
