= Howard Martin (artist) =

Welsh stained glass artist and educator

- Born: 1907; Morriston, Swansea, Wales
- Died: 1972 (aged 64–65); Swansea, Wales
- Education: Swansea School of Art
- Employer: Swansea College of Art
- Known for: stained glass; architectural glass; art education
- Notable work: St Margaret's Church, Crynant; St Gabriel's Church, Swansea
- Title: Vice-Principal, Swansea College of Art; Head of Architectural Glass
- Movement: arts and crafts
- Partner(s): Hubert Thomas (co-founder, Celtic Studios)
- Awards: Howard Martin Design Award (named in his honor)

Howard Martin (1907–1972) was a Welsh stained glass artist, educator, and co-founder of Celtic Studios, the first major stained glass production firm in Wales. In 1935, he established the architectural glass program at the Swansea School of Art (later known as the Welsh School of Architectural Glass), where he subsequently served as Head of Department and Vice-Principal.

== Early life and education ==
Martin was born in Morriston, Swansea, Wales, in 1907. He studied at the Swansea School of Art (then the Swansea School of Arts and Crafts) under the direction of William Grant Murray.

== Career ==
=== Academic career ===
In 1935, Martin was invited by Murray to introduce and teach a part-time stained glass course at the Swansea School of Art. This initiative laid the foundation for the Welsh School of Architectural Glass, where Martin went on to launch the United Kingdom's first diploma course in architectural glass.

Under his leadership as Head of Department and later as Vice-Principal of the college (appointed in 1962), the Swansea program gained national and international recognition, training multiple generations of contemporary glass artists.

=== Celtic Studios ===
Parallel to his teaching career, Martin established a commercial practice with his cousin, Hubert Thomas (1913–1995). Their initial partnership began in 1934 but was suspended during World War II.

In 1948, Martin and Thomas re-established their studio in Prospect Place, Swansea, under the name Celtic Studios. Operating in the tradition of the Arts and Crafts movement while adopting modern aesthetic influences in the late 1950s and 1960s, the studio produced over 700 windows during its 45-year history.

Celtic Studios undertook ecclesiastical and secular commissions across Wales and England, exporting approximately one-third of its total production to North America, particularly Canada.

== Selected works ==
- Church of St Margaret, Crynant, Neath Port Talbot (1951–1954): Series of nave and chancel windows depicting biblical scenes.
- Church of St Gabriel, Brynmill, Swansea (1949): depicting the Transfiguration of Jesus.
- Tabernacl, Morriston, Swansea (1950): depicting Christ's Appearance to Mary Magdalene after the Resurrection.
- Coychurch Crematorium, Bridgend (c. 1970): Preparatory architectural glass designs.

== Howard Martin Design Award ==
Following Martin's death in 1972, the Howard Martin Memorial Trust was formally established on 5 March 1974. The trust administered and funded the annual Howard Martin Design Award (also referred to as the Howard Martin Award), presented to graduating students from the Architectural Glass department at the Swansea College of Art (later the West Glamorgan Institute of Higher Education and Swansea Institute).

For over three decades, the prize was awarded to students for overall design excellence, mastery of technique, and innovative approaches to architectural stained glass. The Howard Martin Memorial Trust was later dissolved and removed from the Charity Commission register in the late 2000s following the restructuring of the university's trust funds.
