= Welsh School =

Welsh School may refer to:

- Education in Wales
- Welsh School (security studies), or emancipatory realism
- Welsh School of Architectural Glass, of Swansea Metropolitan University
- Welsh School of Architecture, of Cardiff University
