= Hoashi =

Hoashi (written: 帆足) is a Japanese surname. Notable people with the surname include:

- Kazuyuki Hoashi (帆足 和幸, born 1979), Japanese baseball player
- Keisuke Hoashi (born 1967), American actor
