= Old Swansea Central Library =

Historic building in Swansea, Wales

Coordinates: 51°37′25.00″N 3°56′38.00″W

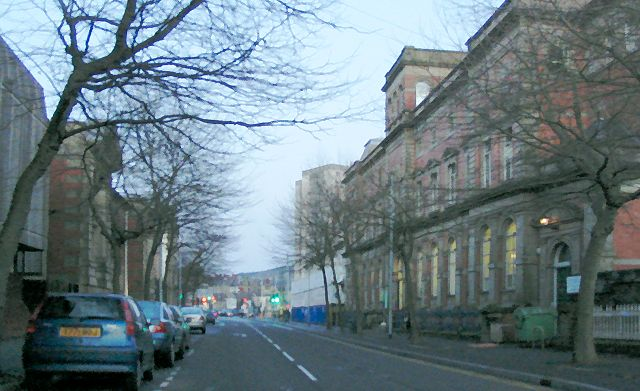
- Location: Alexandra Road, Swansea, SA1 5DX, Wales
- Type: Public library (Reference and Lending)
- Established: 1887

The old Swansea Central Library in Swansea, Wales, was a public lending and reference library in Alexandra Road, in the city centre. The former library, a late 19th-century Grade II listed building, is now occupied by Swansea Metropolitan University's Welsh School of Architectural Glass.

== History ==
The library was designed by Henry Holtom of Dewsbury in the Italian classical style and opened in 1887 by the former and future Prime Minister William Ewart Gladstone. The circular reference library, 86 feet (26 m) in diameter, has a domed top, 25 feet (7.6 m) feet high in the centre. The collections provided a repository of source material for research on Swansea in particular and Wales in general. The Dylan Thomas Collection, established in the early 1950s, consisted of over 3,000 books and periodical articles written by, or about, the Swansea-born poet and author.

The library was closed on 6 November 2007. After its closure, the interior of the library building, including the domed reading room, was used extensively by BBC Wales as a location for the Doctor Who episodes "Silence in the Library" and "Forest of the Dead". The new Swansea Central Library, opened in March 2008, is housed in the Civic Centre alongside the West Glamorgan Archives Service.

In 2007, Swansea Metropolitan University announced that they would acquire the Old Central Library building. With funding assistance from the EU, the university gave the building a £9.69 million renovation, almost £5 million over the budget, turning it into the new Welsh School of Architectural Glass, in 2015. A spokesman for the university stated that additional works were undertaken to meet revised requirements of the listed elements of the building, including the round reading room, the reinstatement of the cupola to the central tower (damaged by World War II bombing) and works to the party walls.
