= O-T Fagbenle =

English actor (born 1981)

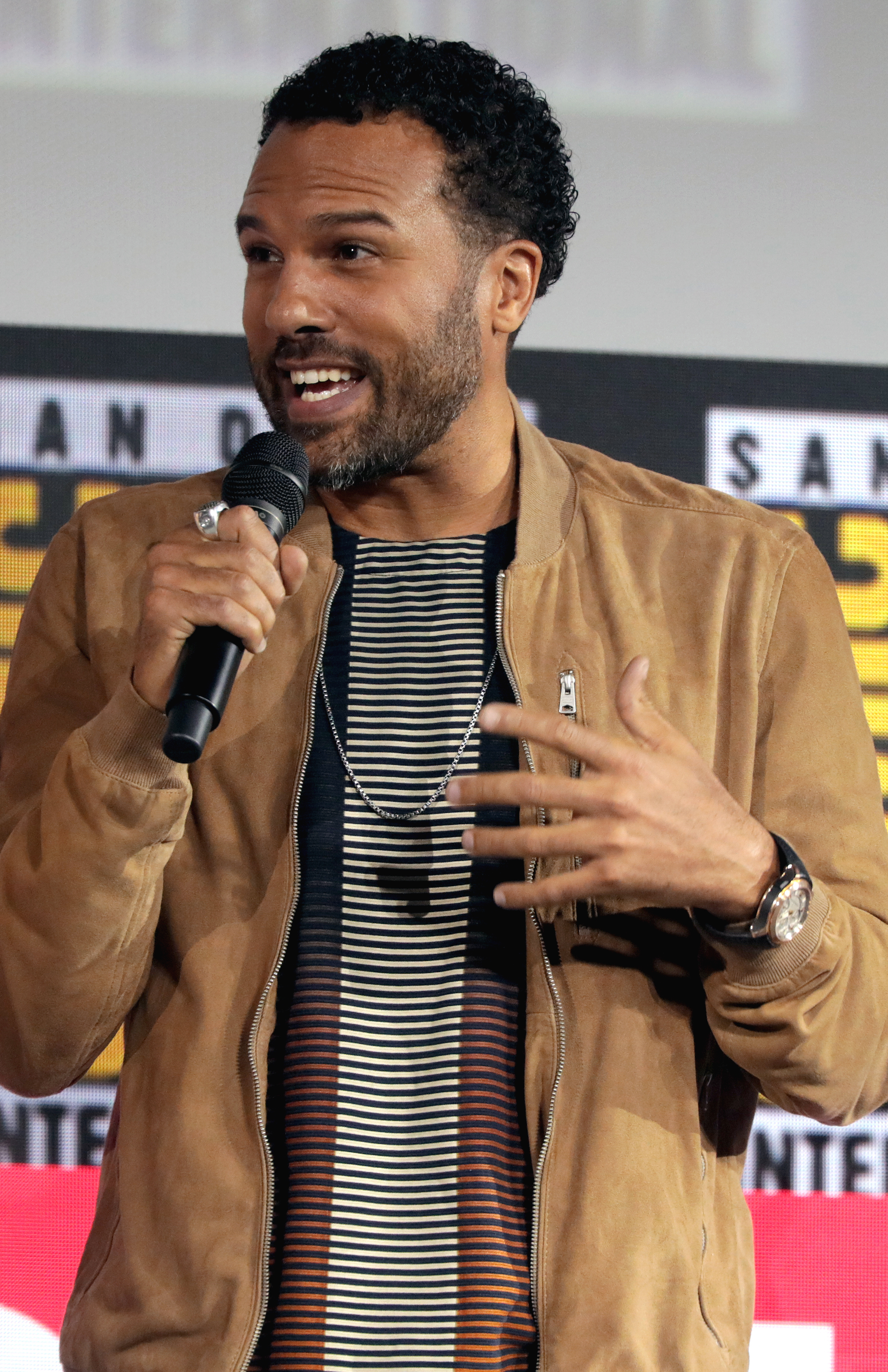
- Fagbenle at the 2019 San Diego Comic-Con
- Born: Olatunde Olateju Olaolorun Fagbenle; 22 January 1981 (age 45); London, England
- Education: Royal Academy of Dramatic Art
- Occupations: Actor, screenwriter, songwriter, director
- Years active: 2002–present
- Relatives: Temi Fagbenle (sister); Luti Fagbenle (brother); Daps (brother)

Olatunde Olateju Olaolorun "O-T" Fagbenle (Yoruba: Ọlátúndé Ọlátẹ́jú Ọláọlọ́run Fágbénlé; born 22 January 1981) is a British actor, writer, and director. He has appeared in several films, stage, and television productions. He is best known for his role as Lucas Bankole in The Handmaid’s Tale (2017–2025), for which he received an Emmy nomination, and his portrayal of Barack Obama in The First Lady (2022).

== Early life ==
Born in London to a Yoruba Nigerian father, journalist Tunde Fagbenle, and an English mother, Ally Bedford, Fagbenle was raised by his mother and lived in Nigeria, Spain, and the UK as a child. He started learning the alto saxophone and within a year joined the South Coast Jazz Band, which toured the Edinburgh Festival. In the UK he performed as a musician in big bands at the Wembley Arena and the Royal Albert Hall.

His younger brothers include actor and film producer Luti Fagbenle, and video director and producer Daps. His sister is WNBA player and Olympian Temi Fagbenle.

== Career ==
=== Acting ===
==== Theatre ====
Fagbenle started acting at the age of 14 for the Ritual Theatre Arts and was given the lead role in an adaptation of William Shakespeare's Macbeth, performing at international venues and at central London's Bloomsbury Theatre. He trained at the Royal Academy of Dramatic Arts and graduated early to make his graduate debut at the Royal Exchange Theatre, Manchester in Les Blancs in 2001. Fagbenle originated the role of "Perry" in the Royal Court's production of the award-winning production of Fallout.

Fagbenle continued his Shakespearean roles by performing in Romeo and Juliet as Mercutio in a national tour culminating at the Hong Kong Arts Festival in 2004. The Evening Telegraph said of his performance, "O-T Fagbenle achieves the impossible by almost overshadowing the young lovers with his inspired performance of Mercutio".

Fagbenle was soon offered his first leading role. Outstanding reviews preceded a M.E.N. Theatre Award for best actor in a leading role for his portrayal of a man claiming to be Sidney Poitier's son in John Guare's award-winning play Six Degrees of Separation.

In 2008, Fagbenle flew to Paris with the theatre director Peter Brook to help workshop and develop Brook's international production of Tierno Bokar.

After John W. Bubbles in the original opera and Sammy Davis Jr. in the film, Fagbenle played the role of Sportin' Life in Sir Trevor Nunn's production of Porgy and Bess - The Musical at the Savoy Theatre in the West End of London. Fagbenle received outstanding reviews. Variety magazine's review remarked, "There are moments everything takes wing as a musical, mostly whenever Fagbenle's splendidly serpentine, easeful Sportin' Life is around. Light on his feet, his every moment is poised and polished."

In 2012 in London, England, Fagbenle took on the role of Slupianek in The Conquest of the South Pole at the Arcola and Rose Theatres. Again Fagbenle won critical acclaim across the board for his performance, with TimeOut, The British Theatre Guide, Spoonfed, Whatsonstage.com, and industry-standard The Stage all praising his performance. Fagbenle was nominated by panel for the 2012 Offie for Best Male Performance.

It was announced by The Royal National Theatre that Fagbenle would be cast as the lead in their 2016 production of the play Ma Rainey's Black Bottom. Fagbenle led his cast to win the Olivier Award for best revival.

==== Film ====
In 2006, Fagbenle appeared as Joe in the feature film Breaking and Entering with Jude Law and Juliette Binoche. He portrayed Sean, an American television star, opposite Michelle Pfeiffer and Paul Rudd, in Amy Heckerling's 2007 I Could Never Be Your Woman.

In 2021, he appeared as Rick Mason in the Marvel Cinematic Universe film Black Widow.

==== Television ====
Fagbenle starred in Little Miss Jocelyn from 2004 to 2006, as various characters in season one and as Mrs. Omwokwopopo's dead husband in season two. In 2006, Fagbenle starred in a BBC sitcom called Grownups and also appeared in the British TV series Agatha Christie's Marple. Fagbenle played "Other Dave" in the 2008, two-part Doctor Who story, "Silence in the Library" and "Forest of the Dead". In 2008–2009, Fagbenle starred in two dramas for the BBC, including the role of Walter Tull in Walter's War, a biopic of the first mixed-heritage officer in the British Army, in which he again garnered outstanding international reviews.

In 2009, Fagbenle played the role of Topher Kiefer in the ITV series, FM, and in January 2010 Fagbenle took a leading role as Chris in the BBC One show Material Girl, starring Dervla Kirwan and Lenora Crichlow. He then had a continuing role in both three-episode installments of the 2010 Thorne television series with David Morrissey in the titular role, which were adapted from two Mark Billingham novels, Sleepyhead (episodes 1–2, also starring Natascha McElhone) and Scaredy Cat (episodes 4–6, also starring Sandra Oh), all directed by Stephen Hopkins. After his Material Girl performance, he went on to be cast in the 2011 American romantic comedy Double Wedding. Fagbenle also appeared as Mark Lightfoot in episode six of the first season of Death in Paradise in that same year.

In 2012, Fagbenle accepted a lead role in the 2013 BBC comedy Quick Cuts alongside actress and Smack the Pony star Doon Mackichan. That same year, he starred in the first season of HBO's original drama Looking, where played Frank, a sweet-hearted Ohio musician with troubles from a live-in partner (reprising the role in season 2). BBC Drama cast Fagbenle in the lead role of their criminal drama The Interceptor, which began filming in London in April 2014; in 2015 he was won the MViSA awards for best male actor for his performance in that work.

After appearing in the second season of HBO's Looking, Fagbenle was cast as the lead in American crime writer Harlan Coben's original drama series The Five which first aired in April 2016 on Sky 1 in the United Kingdom. On 14 November 2016 he appeared in a BBC2 adaptation of Zadie Smith's novel NW. In 2017, he began the role of Luke Bankole in Hulu's screen adaption of Margaret Atwood's novel The Handmaid's Tale, for which he has received multiple nominations for Screen Actors Guild awards.

On 16 August 2021, it was announced that Fagbenle had joined the cast of Apple TV+ limited series WeCrashed in a recurring role as Cameron Lautner.

In 2023, Fagbenle reprised his role as Rick Mason from Black Widow in a cameo appearance in the Disney+ miniseries Secret Invasion, also set in the MCU. In 2024 he was featured in Apple TV's Loot, starring Maya Rudolph, as Sophia Salina's boyfriend.

In 2024, he played Nico Della Guardia in Presumed Innocent.

==== Radio ====
For several months in 2004 he took the part of Kwame in the BBC World Service radio soap opera Westway.

He has performed multiple times for the BBC including the lead role in Six Degrees of Separation, playing Marvin Gaye in a biopic, and two roles in the BBC Radio adaptation of The Color Purple, which went on to win the Sony Radio Academy Awards for Drama in 2009.

=== Writing and directing ===
In April 2020 Fagbenle made history when he became the first person to write, direct, compose, star and executive produce the opening episode of a TV series on a major US network with his show Maxxx (Hulu).

In 2021 Deadline reported that following the success of Maxxx "The multi-hyphenate currently has drama, comedy and non-scripted content in development."

Fagbenle's debut short film Moth won Best Sci-fi Horror at the London Film Festival The film, which was a metaphor for the effect of mentally ill parenting on children, was also made a part of a number of film festivals including the official selection at the Los Angeles Screamfest Film Festival, New York City Horror Film Festival, Austin Film Festival.

After a being awarded a fund by the Nigerian high commission/TRSE to write and direct a teaser for his movie idea, Fagbenle was commissioned by Bafta-nominated Lutimedia to develop Big Bad Blood, a teen comedy television series.

=== Music ===
Along with a starring actor credit, Fagbenle composed the music and penned the lyrics for several songs for the NBC drama Quarterlife, created by Marshall Herskovitz and Oscar-winner Ed Zwick.

In 2011 Fagbenle co-wrote the song "Storm" for Grammy nominated artist Tyga on his Black Thoughts Vol. 2 mixtape and received over 8 million hits on worldstarhiphop.com.

== Filmography ==
=== Film ===
Year	Title	Role	Notes
2006	Breaking and Entering	Joe	
2007	I Could Never Be Your Woman	Sean	
2008	Radio Cape Cod	Sunday Umankwe	
2014	Non-Stop	Jack Rabbitte (voice)	Uncredited
2021	Black Widow	Rick Mason	
2025	Splitsville	Brent	
TBA	Eleven Missing Days	Allen Lane	Filming

=== Television ===
Year	Title	Role	Notes
2002	EastEnders	Angel Heavy	2 episodes
2004	Casualty	Terry O'Brien	1 episode
2004	As If	Tyler	Recurring role, 7 episodes
2004	Hollyoaks	James Walker	1 episode
2005	Doctors	Todd Dexter	1 episode
2006	Agatha Christie's Marple	Chris Murphy	Episode: "By the Pricking of My Thumbs"
2006	Grownups	Dean	Main role, 8 episodes
2006–2008	Little Miss Jocelyn	Various	4 episodes
2007	The Last Detective	Gary Green	1 episode
2008	Quarterlife	John	4 episodes
2008	Dirt	O-T	1 episode
2008	Doctor Who	Other Dave	2 episodes: "Forest of the Dead" and "Silence in the Library"
2008	My Boys	Dez	1 episode
2008	Consuming Passion: 100 Years of Mills & Boon	Jake	1 episode
2009	FM	Topher Kiefer	Main role, 6 episodes
2009	Monday Monday	Mark	1 episode
2009	Brothers	Walter	1 episode
2010	Material Girl	Chris	Main role, 6 episodes
2010	Double Wedding	Tate	Television film
2010	Thorne	Dave Holland	Miniseries, 6 episodes
2011	Happy Endings	Adrian	1 episode
2011	Death in Paradise	Mark Lightfoot	1 episode
2012	Secrets and Words	Eddie	1 episode
2013	Pat & Cabbage	Steve	1 episode
2014–2015	Looking	Frank	Recurring role, 8 episodes
2015	The Interceptor	Marcus "Ash" Ashton	Miniseries, 8 episodes
2016	The Five	D.S. Danny Kenwood	Miniseries, 10 episodes
2016	Looking: The Movie	Frank	Television film
2017–2025	The Handmaid's Tale	Luke Bankole	Main role, 39 episodes
2020	Maxxx	Maxxx	Main role, 6 episodes
2022	The First Lady	President Barack Obama	Main role, 10 episodes
2022	WeCrashed	Cameron Lautner	Miniseries, 5 episodes
2023	Secret Invasion	Rick Mason	Miniseries, 1 episode
2024	Loot	Isaac	Recurring role, 5 episodes
2024	Presumed Innocent	Nico Della Guardia	Miniseries
2024	No Good Deed	Dennis	Main cast
2025	All's Fair	Dr. Reginald "Reggie" Ramirez	Recurring
2026	The Old Stories: Moses	Pharaoh	Miniseries
2026	The Miniature Wife	Richard	Main role, 10 episodes

Video game
Year	Title	Role
2013	Assassin's Creed IV: Black Flag	John Rackham

== Awards and nominations ==
Fagbenle was the recipient of an Outstanding Achievement Award at the 13th African Film Awards. Fagbenle was nominated for the 2012 Offie for Best Male Performance; a 'charismatic' portrayal of Slupianek in The Conquest of the South Pole).

Fagbenle was awarded Best Actor in a Leading Role at the M.E.N. awards for his performance in Six Degrees of Separation. In 2015, Fagbenle was nominated for "Best Male Performance on TV" by the Screen Nation Awards for his performance as Frank on HBO's Looking.

In 2015, Fagbenle was nominated and awarded by the MViSA awards for BEST MALE ACTOR for his performance in The Interceptor.

In 2016, Fagbenle and the cast of Ma Rainey's Black Bottom at the Royal National Theatre led the production to an Olivier Award, the most prestigious honour in British Theatre.

In 2018, Fagbenle collected The Handmaid's Tale's International BAFTA Award. In 2019, Fagbenle received a Screen Actors Guild Award nomination for his role on The Handmaid's Tale.

In 2021 O-T Fagbenle received an Emmy Award nomination for his performance on the Hulu series The Handmaid's Tale. For four seasons, he has played Luke, who is the husband of June Osborne played by Elizabeth Moss.

In 2021 O-T Fagbenle was nominated for best comedy performance at the Royal Television Society Awards for the comedy Maxxx, which he also wrote and produced.

In 2021 O-T as nominated for Best Actor at the prestigious Edinburgh TV awards for his show Maxxx.

In 2021 Maxxx received a nomination for Best Scripted Comedy at the National Comedy Awards celebrating the UK's most brilliant comedy content and creators. He was also individually nominated for best comedy actor.

In 2021 O-T Fagbenle was nominated for Outstanding Comedy Actor and Maxxx was nominated for Best Scripted Comedy Series at the National Comedy Awards launched by Channel 4.
