= Talulah Riley =

English actress (born 1985)

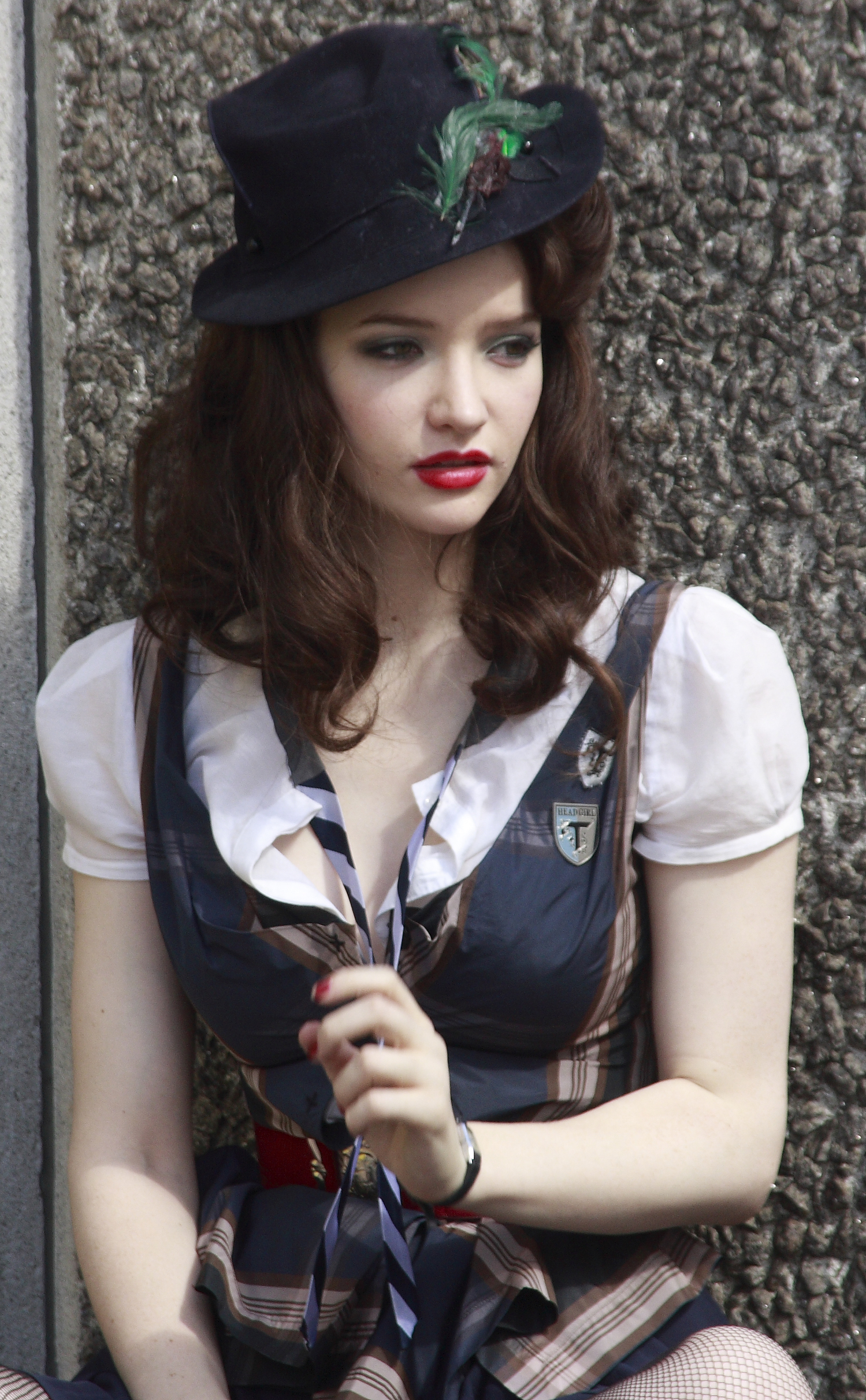
- Riley in 2009
- Born: Talulah Jane Riley-Milburn; 26 September 1985 (age 41); Hemel Hempstead, Hertfordshire, England
- Education: Open University
- Occupation: Actress
- Years active: 2003–present
- Spouses: Elon Musk (m. 2010; div. 2012); (m. 2013; div. 2016); Thomas Brodie-Sangster (m. 2024)

Talulah Jane Riley-Milburn (born 26 September 1985) is an English actress. She has appeared in films, including Pride & Prejudice (2005), St Trinian's (2007) and its sequel St Trinian's 2: The Legend of Fritton's Gold (2009), The Boat That Rocked (2009), and Inception (2010). She has also appeared on the HBO science fiction western series Westworld (2016–2018) and the FX biographical miniseries Pistol (2022).

== Early life and education ==
Talulah Jane Riley-Milburn was born on 26 September 1985 in Hemel Hempstead in Hertfordshire, where she grew up as the only child of Una Riley, founder of a security systems company and a public relations company, and Doug Milburn, formerly head of the National Crime Squad. Her father has worked as a screenwriter, writing episodes of Silent Witness and The Bill.

Riley was educated at Cheltenham Ladies' College, independent Berkhamsted Collegiate School, and Haberdashers' Girls' School. While acting in London, she studied for a degree in natural sciences at the Open University.

== Career ==
=== Television ===
Riley's television credits include episodes of Poirot (2003), Marple (2006), and Doctor Who (2008's "Silence in the Library" and "Forest of the Dead"). She played Lila, a lovestruck writer, in the short-lived E4 series Nearly Famous (2007). She played Angela in the first two seasons of the television series Westworld.

=== Stage ===
Riley made her stage debut in The Philadelphia Story at the Old Vic in 2005. Her performance in a 2006 revival of Tennessee Williams' Summer and Smoke was described by critic Rachel Read as "delightful".

=== Film ===
Riley played Mary Bennet in the 2005 version of Pride and Prejudice and Marianne in 2009's The Boat That Rocked. She starred in the 2007 film St Trinian's and its 2009 sequel St Trinian's: The Legend of Fritton's Gold.

Riley appeared as a disguise used by Tom Hardy's character in Inception (2010). Also in 2010, Love and Distrust was released direct-to-video, featuring five unique short films, the first of which was The Summer House, in which Riley was co-lead, opposite Robert Pattinson. Available as a standalone download, The Summer House was the number one film on iTunes worldwide on its first day of release, holding that position for several days. She also appeared in White Frog.

Between 2009 and 2015, Riley developed an idea and story by her father into a screenplay, then ultimately directed (after being unable to hire another director to helm the project) and starred in the resulting feature film Scottish Mussel.

=== Writing ===
Her debut novel, Acts of Love, was published by Hodder & Stoughton in August 2016. In June 2022, Riley released her second novel, The Quickening, also published by Hodder & Stoughton. She is also listed as a contributor to Encounters with Jane Austen: Celebrating 250 years.

=== Other ===
She was featured on the March 2010 cover of Esquire. In 2011, she was named a "Brit to Watch" by the British Academy of Film and Television Arts.

== Personal life ==
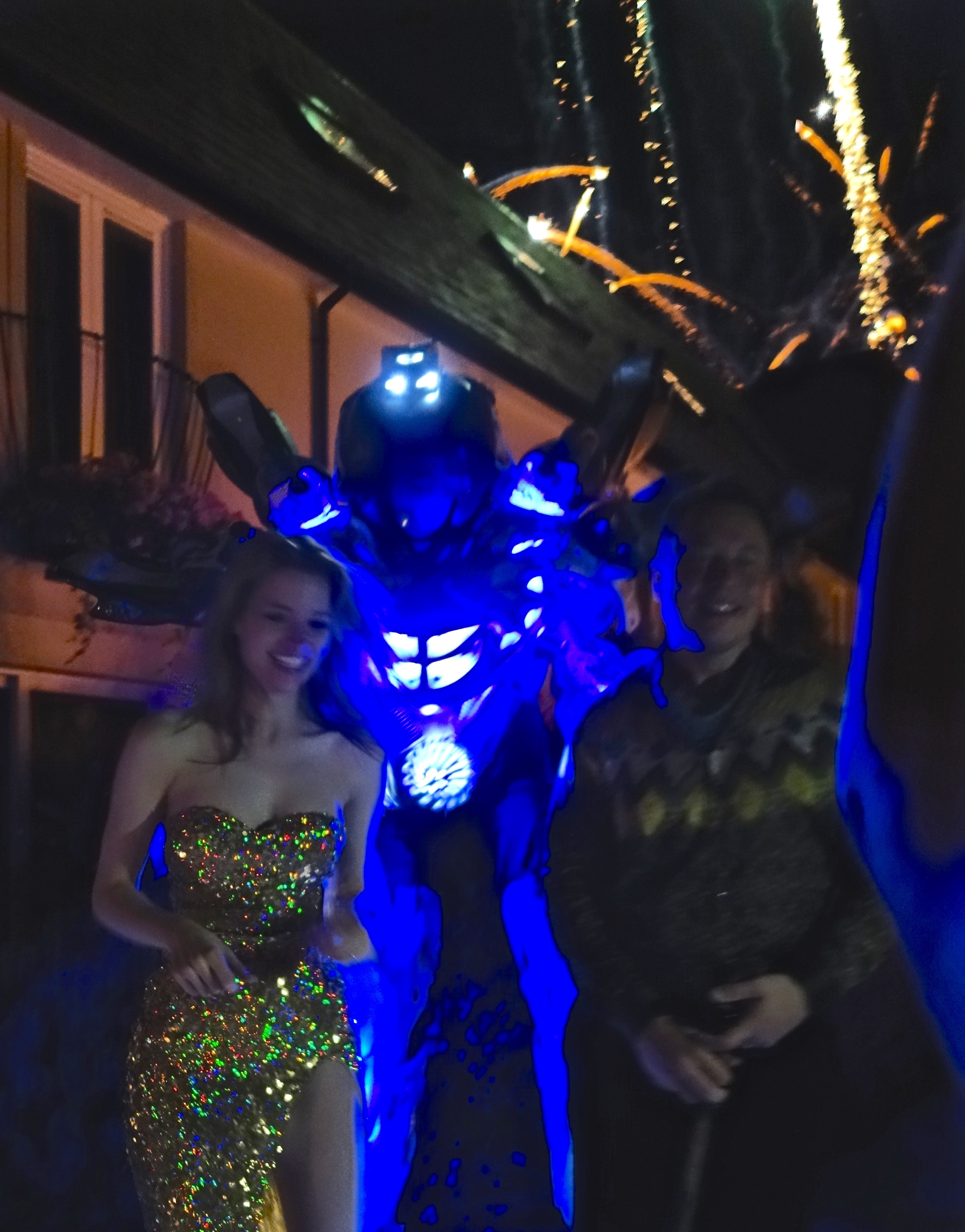
Riley and Musk at a party in 2015, seven months before their second divorce

In 2008, Riley began a relationship with businessman and entrepreneur Elon Musk. They married two years later at Dornoch Cathedral in the Scottish Highlands. The couple divorced in March 2012.

In July 2013, Musk and Riley remarried. In a 60 Minutes interview in 2014, the couple said they had reconciled and were living together again, along with Musk's five children from his first marriage to Justine Wilson. On 31 December 2014, Musk filed for divorce a second time, but later withdrew the action. After living separately for six months, Riley filed for a second divorce in Los Angeles Superior Court on 21 March 2016. The divorce was finalised in October 2016.

During Elon Musk's acquisition of Twitter in October 2022, text exchanges between Musk and Riley were released wherein she pleaded with him to buy the social media site: "Please do something to fight woke-ism. I will do anything to help! xx". The comments came shortly after the right-wing satire outlet The Babylon Bee was suspended from Twitter for referring to transgender public health official Rachel Levine as “Man of the Year.” Riley called the move "crazy", asking "Why has everyone become so puritanical?" (see The Babylon Bee § Twitter ban and reinstatement)

Riley married actor Thomas Brodie-Sangster on 22 June 2024 in Hertfordshire.

== Filmography ==
Film
Year	Title	Role	Notes	Ref.
2005	Pride & Prejudice	Mary Bennet		
2007	St Trinian's	Annabelle Fritton		
2007	Friends Forever	Grace	Short film	
2007	Wilder	Carro		
2009	The Boat That Rocked	Marianne		
2009	The Summer House	Jane	Short film	
2009	St Trinian's 2: The Legend of Fritton's Gold	Annabelle Fritton		
2010	Inception	Eames's Blonde Woman disguise		
2010	Love & Distrust	Jane	Archive footage of The Summer House	
2011	The Dilemma	Concept Car Spokesmodel		
2011	Revenge of the Electric Car	Herself	Documentary	
2012	The Knot	Alexandra		
2012	White Frog	Ms. Lee		
2012	Transmission	TBA		
2013	The Liability	The Girl		
2013	In a World...	Pippa		
2013	Thor: The Dark World	Asgardian Nurse		
2015	Scottish Mussel	Beth	Also writer and director	
2015	The Bad Education Movie	Phoebe		
2016	Submerged	Jessie		
2018	The Last Witness	Jeanette Mitchell		
2020	Bloodshot	Gina DeCarlo		
2021	Father Christmas Is Back	Vicky Christmas		

Television
Year	Title	Role	Notes	Ref.
2003	Agatha Christie's Poirot	Young Angela Warren	Episode: "Five Little Pigs"	
2006	Agatha Christie's Marple	Megan Hunter	Episode: "The Moving Finger"	
2007	Nearly Famous	Lila Reed	Main role; 6 episodes	
2008	Phoo Action	Lady Elenor Rigsby	Cancelled before broadcast	
2008	Doctor Who	Miss Evangelista	Episodes: "Silence in the Library"/"Forest of the Dead"	
2008	The Gemma Factor	Nell	Scenes not broadcast	
2016–2018	Westworld	Angela	Recurring role (season 1); main role (season 2); 12 episodes	
2022	Pistol	Vivienne Westwood	Main role; miniseries	
2022	The Elon Musk Show	Herself	Three-part docuseries	
