= Alex Kingston =

English actress (born 1963)

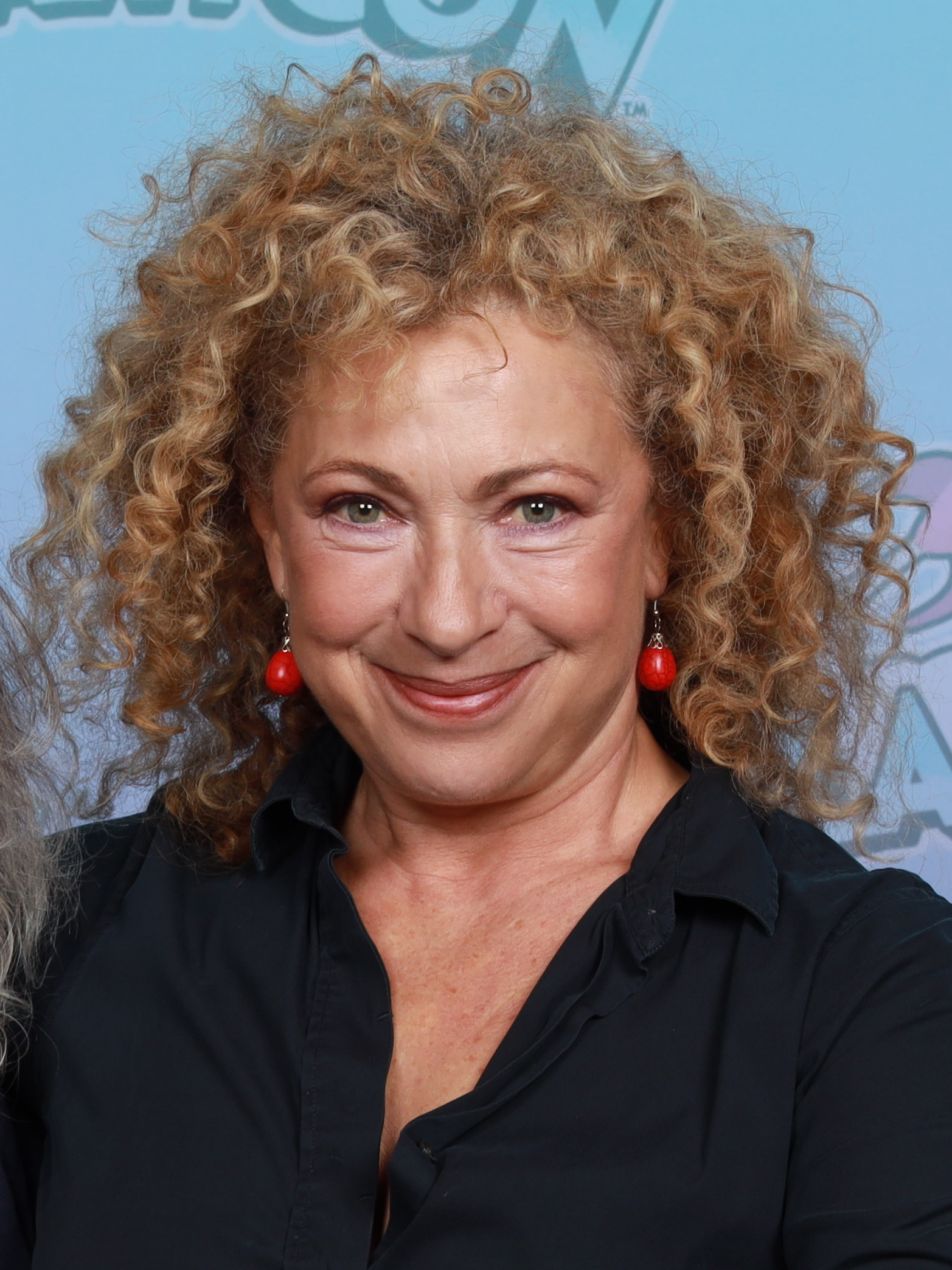
- Kingston at the 2025 GalaxyCon Richmond
- Born: Alexandra Elizabeth Kingston; 11 March 1963 (age 63); Epsom, Surrey, England
- Education: Royal Academy of Dramatic Art
- Occupation: Actress
- Years active: 1980–present
- Spouses: Ralph Fiennes (m. 1993; div. 1997); Florian Haertel (m. 1998; div. 2013); Jonathan Stamp (m. 2015)
- Children: 1
- Relatives: Walter Renneisen (maternal uncle)

Alexandra Elizabeth Kingston (born 11 March 1963) is an English actress. Active from the early 1980s, Kingston became noted for her television work in both Britain and the US in the 1990s, including her regular role as Dr. Elizabeth Corday in the NBC medical drama ER (1997–2004) and her title role in the ITV miniseries The Fortunes and Misfortunes of Moll Flanders (1996), which earned her a BAFTA nomination for Best Actress.

Kingston's later credits include the recurring role of River Song in the BBC science fiction series Doctor Who (2008–2015), Mrs. Bennet in the ITV period-drama fantasy Lost in Austen (2008), Dinah Lance in The CW's superhero fiction drama series Arrow (2013–2016), and Sarah Bishop in A Discovery of Witches (2018–2022).

== Early life ==
Kingston was born and brought up in Epsom, Surrey, to Anthony Kingston, an English butcher, and his German wife, Margarethe (née Renneisen). Kingston's paternal great-great-grandmother was Jewish, an ancestry Kingston explored on the series Who Do You Think You Are? Kingston's uncle, her mother's younger brother, is actor Walter Renneisen. Her younger sisters are Susie, who is mentally and physically disabled as a result of being deprived of oxygen at birth, and Nicola, a former actress who appeared in the 1996 British TV production of The Fortunes and Misfortunes of Moll Flanders, in which Kingston starred.

Kingston was inspired to pursue acting by one of her teachers at Rosebery School for Girls. Kingston auditioned and performed in the Surrey County Youth Theatre production of Tom Jones as Mrs. Fitzpatrick, alongside Sean Pertwee as Captain Fitzpatrick, and Thwackum played by Tom Davison. She later completed a three-year programme at the Royal Academy of Dramatic Art and went on to join the Royal Shakespeare Company.

== Career ==
=== 1980–2007: Early career and breakthrough with ER ===
In 1980, Kingston made her television debut in three episodes of the children's drama series Grange Hill, while also appearing as an uncredited extra in the film The Wildcats of St Trinian's. From the mid-1980s to the mid-1990s, she performed on stage in twenty different theatrical productions, working extensively with the Birmingham Repertory Theatre and the Royal Shakespeare Company. Her classic Shakespearean roles included Calpurnia in Julius Caesar (1987), Cordelia in King Lear (1990), Hero in Much Ado About Nothing (1990–1991), Titania in A Midsummer Night's Dream (1992) and Desdemona in Othello (1993).

Around the same time, she had small parts in television shows such as A Killing on the Exchange (1987), Hannay (1989), Covington Cross (1992), Soldier Soldier (1993) and Crocodile Shoes (1994), and had guest roles in ITV's long-running police procedural The Bill (1988–1995). In film, she appeared in The Cook, the Thief, His Wife & Her Lover (1989) with Helen Mirren, The Infiltrator (1995) with Oliver Platt and Carrington (1995) with Emma Thompson, where she played writer Frances Partridge.

In April 1996, she got her first regular television role as customs officer Katherine Roberts in the ITV crime drama The Knock, appearing in all thirteen episodes of the second series. In December, she played the lead role opposite Daniel Craig in The Fortunes and Misfortunes of Moll Flanders, an ITV adaptation of Daniel Defoe's novel Moll Flanders. She received a nomination for Best Actress for her performance at the following year's British Academy Television Awards.

In September 1997, Kingston gained North American television fame after being cast as a main character in the long-running medical drama ER. She made her first appearance as British surgeon Elizabeth Corday in the premiere of the fourth season, the Emmy Award-winning live episode "Ambush". Having appeared in the show for just over seven seasons, she left it in October 2004, in the eleventh-season episode "Fear", after her contract was not renewed. Being 41 at the time, she criticised the move as ageism, stating that "apparently, I, according to the producers and the writers, am part of the old fogies who are no longer interesting." Despite that, she said that she was "very proud of the work [she had] done over the past eight years" and "grateful for the professional associations and friendships [she had] made through ER".

The ER role helped propel Kingston's career to new heights, which led to a number of big-screen appearances in films such as the Clive Owen neo-noir drama Croupier (1998) and independent period drama Sweet Land (2005), as well as the crime dramas Essex Boys (2000) and Alpha Dog (2006). In 2003, she battled Romans as the warrior queen of Britain in ITV's biopic Boudica, which was also released in the USA on PBS under the title Warrior Queen and marked the screen debut of Emily Blunt.

In November 2005, Kingston guest starred as a vacationer whose husband gets kidnapped by a Mexican street gang in an episode of the CBS crime drama Without a Trace, titled "Viuda Negra" and directed by her former ER co-star Paul McCrane. The following year, she returned to the stage after ten years in the West End production of One Flew Over the Cuckoo's Nest, starring as Nurse Ratched opposite Christian Slater as Randle McMurphy. She then revealed that she auditioned for the role of Lynette Scavo on ABC's Desperate Housewives but was turned away for being too curvy.

=== 2008–2015: Doctor Who and further television and stage work ===
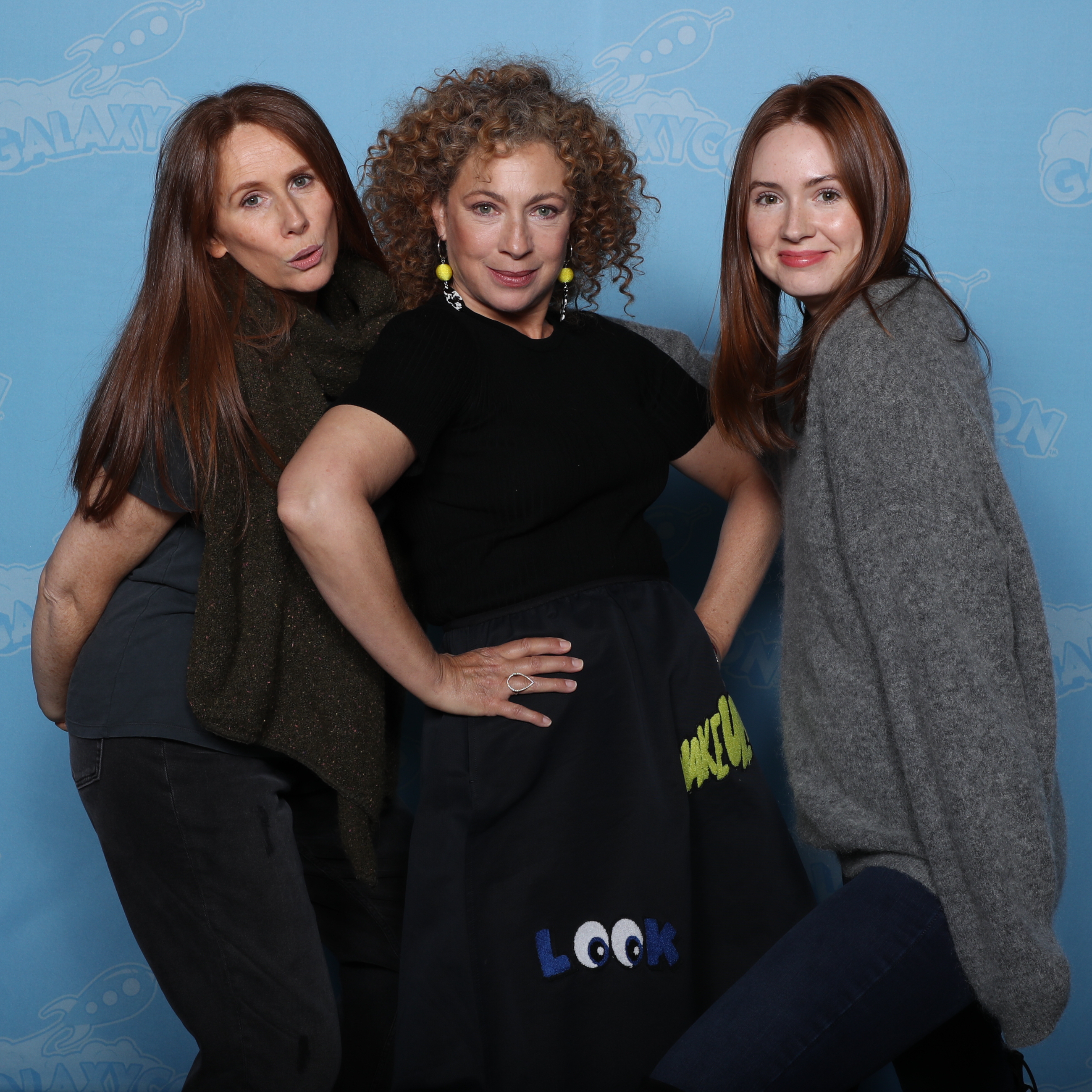
Kingston with her Doctor Who co-stars Catherine Tate and Karen Gillan at the 2019 GalaxyCon Minneapolis

In 2008, Kingston guest starred as Professor River Song in the fourth series of the BBC's long-running science fiction television series Doctor Who, in the two-part story "Silence in the Library" / "Forest of the Dead", starring David Tennant as the Tenth Doctor. She thought it was simply a one-off guest role but was delighted to find out that she would be a returning character after the story's writer, Steven Moffat, succeeded Russell T Davies as the Doctor Who showrunner. She reprised the role in thirteen episodes between 2010 and 2015, appearing on screen opposite two more incarnations of the Doctor played by Matt Smith and Peter Capaldi. Kingston has also portrayed the role in a number of audio dramas from Big Finish Productions, including her solo series The Diary of River Song (2015–2023).

In September 2008, Kingston took the part of Mrs. Bennet in ITV's acclaimed four-part drama Lost in Austen, based on Jane Austen's novel Pride and Prejudice. In October, she appeared in the episode "Art Imitates Life" of the police procedural drama CSI: Crime Scene Investigation as psychiatrist and grief counsellor Patricia Alwick, who helped the team cope with the recent death of one of their members.

In both 2009 and 2010, Kingston had recurring roles as MI6 agent Fiona Banks in the ABC science fiction drama FlashForward and defence attorney Miranda Pond in the NBC legal drama Law & Order: Special Victims Unit, in which she reunited with her former ER castmates, Mariska Hargitay and Maria Bello. In spring 2009, Kingston returned to ER itself during its fifteenth and final season for two episodes, "Dream Runner" and the two-hour series finale, "And in the End...". In June, she starred as the lead character Ellie Lagden, one of four former convicts, in the BBC One eight-part drama series Hope Springs.

In the early 2010s, Kingston played a housewife in the five-part supernatural drama Marchlands (2011), an archaeologist in the second series of the revived Upstairs Downstairs (2012) and an analyst working for a missing persons unit in the four-part crime drama Chasing Shadows (2014). In the US, she appeared in the romantic film Like Crazy (2011) and the Grey's Anatomy spin-off series Private Practice (2011), in the guest role of a psychiatrist writing book reviews.

She starred in the first season of The CW's superhero drama series Arrow (2013) as Professor Dinah Lance, the mother of Laurel and Sara Lance, and later reprised the role in a few episodes over the next three seasons. On stage, she participated in the Donmar Warehouse production of Friedrich Schiller's play Luise Miller (2011), directed by Michael Grandage.

In July 2013, she played Lady Macbeth opposite Kenneth Branagh in the Manchester International Festival's production of Macbeth, which was broadcast live in cinemas worldwide as part of the National Theatre Live programme. Following a nomination for Best Actress at the Manchester Theatre Awards, she reprised her role with Branagh at the Park Avenue Armory in June 2014, making her New York stage debut. Earlier in April, Branagh and Kingston took other classic Shakespearean lead roles in the two-and-a-half-hour adaptation of Antony and Cleopatra, broadcast on BBC Radio 3 as part of its celebration of the 450th anniversary of Shakespeare's birth.

=== 2016–present: Recent work ===
During the late 2010s, she took a prominent role as Sarah Bishop in Sky's fantasy drama A Discovery of Witches (2018–2022), while appearing in shows such as Gilmore Girls: A Year in the Life (2016), Shoot the Messenger (2016) and The Widow (2019). In 2021, she wrote a River Song novel called Doctor Who: The Ruby's Curse for BBC Books, and reprised the role for pre-recorded elements of the interactive theatrical experience Time Fracture.

In 2022, she starred as British Prime Minister candidate Audrey Gratz in the Netflix spy miniseries Treason and as the villainous Lucifer in the Oliver Twist-inspired children's television series Dodger, also starring the Ninth Doctor actor, Christopher Eccleston.

In a 2022 interview, Kingston expressed her enthusiasm for returning to Doctor Who, stating that if offered a role alongside Ncuti Gatwa's Fifteenth Doctor, she would "bite their hand off" to accept the opportunity.

In January 2023, she returned to the Royal Shakespeare Company for the first time since the early nineties in the role of Prospero in The Tempest.

In 2024, Kingston played Sheila Bellowes opposite former Doctor Who co-star Karen Gillan in the ITV drama Douglas Is Cancelled, also written by former Doctor Who showrunner Steven Moffat.

In August 2025, Kingston was announced as a contestant on the twenty-third series of Strictly Come Dancing. She was paired with Johannes Radebe and the pair were the eighth couple to be eliminated in week 10 of the competition, after losing the dance-off to Balvinder Sopal and Julian Caillon.

== Personal life ==
Kingston met English actor Ralph Fiennes while they were both students at the Royal Academy of Dramatic Art. They were together for ten years before marrying in 1993. In 1995, Fiennes began an affair with his Hamlet co-star Francesca Annis and left Kingston the following year. They divorced in 1997. In a 2006 interview, she admitted to considering and nearly attempting suicide after her separation from Fiennes.

At the end of 1998, Kingston married Florian Haertel, a German writer and freelance journalist, having met him the previous year on a blind date arranged by friends. They had a daughter, Salome Violetta Haertel, born 28 March 2001. Kingston and Haertel separated in 2009. In October 2009, Haertel sued Kingston for dissolution of the marriage. In 2013, the divorce was finalised.

In September 2012, Kingston appeared on the BBC genealogy series Who Do You Think You Are?, investigating the lives of her great-grandfather Will Keevil and her four-times great-grandmother, Elizabeth Braham.

In 2015, Kingston married Jonathan Stamp, a television producer, in an Italian ceremony.

Kingston has lived in the United States and moved back to the UK in 2019.

In 2025, Kingston revealed that she had been diagnosed and successfully treated for uterine cancer in 2024.

== Filmography ==
=== Film ===
Year	Title	Role	Notes
1980	The Wildcats of St. Trinian's	Schoolgirl	Uncredited
1989	The Cook, the Thief, His Wife & Her Lover	Adele	
1994	A Pin for the Butterfly	Mrs. Solomon	
1995	Carrington	Frances Partridge	
1996	Saint-Ex	Chic Party Guest	
1998	Croupier	Jani de Villiers	
1999	This Space Between Us	Peternelle	
2000	Essex Boys	Lisa Locke	
2005	Sweet Land	Brownie	
2005	The Poseidon Adventure	Suzanne Harrison	
2006	Alpha Dog	Tiffany Hartunian	
2007	Crashing	Diane Freed	
2009	Sordid Things	Eve Manchester	
2011	Like Crazy	Jackie	
2011	Ghost Phone: Phone Calls from the Dead	Sheila	
2013	Bukowski	Katharina Bukowski	Unreleased
2016	Happily Ever After	Ria	
2018	Deadpan	Tamara	Short film
2024	The Killer's Game	Sharon Rabinowitz	

=== Television ===
Year	Title	Role	Notes
1980	Grange Hill	Jill Harcourt	3 episodes
1986	Henry's Leg	Noreen	Miniseries
1987	A Killing on the Exchange	Ellen	Miniseries
1988–1995	The Bill	Dr. Howard / Lisa / Maggie Fisher	4 episodes
1989	Hannay	Kirsten Larssen	Episode: "The Terrors of the Earth"
1989	The Play on One	Daniella	Episode: "These Foolish Things"
1992	Covington Cross	Helen	Episode: "Cedric Hits the Road"
1993	Foreign Affairs	Actress	TV film
1993	Soldier Soldier	Ursula Kröhling	Episode: "Camouflage"
1994	Woman of the Wolf	Woman (voice)	TV film
1994	Crocodile Shoes	Caroline Carrison	5 episodes
1995	The Infiltrator	Anna	TV film
1996	The Knock	Katherine Roberts	13 episodes
1996	Last of the Czars	Alexandra (voice)	3 episodes
1996	The Fortunes and Misfortunes of Moll Flanders	Moll Flanders	Miniseries
1997	Weapons of Mass Distraction	Verity Graham	TV film
1997–2009	ER	Dr. Elizabeth Corday	160 episodes
2003	Boudica	Boudica	TV film; a.k.a. Warrior Queen
2005	The Poseidon Adventure	Suzanne Harrison	TV film
2005	Without a Trace	Lucy Costin	Episode: "Viuda Negra"
2008	Freezing	Serena Wilson	Episode #1.3
2008	Lost in Austen	Mrs. Bennet	Miniseries
2008	CSI: Crime Scene Investigation	Patricia Alwick	Episode: "Art Imitates Life"
2008, 2010–2013, 2015	Doctor Who	River Song	15 episodes
2009	Hope Springs	Ellie Lagden	8 episodes
2009–2010	FlashForward	Fiona Banks	3 episodes
2009–2010	Law & Order: Special Victims Unit	Miranda Pond	4 episodes
2010	Ben Hur	Ruth	Miniseries
2011	Private Practice	Dr. Marla Thomkins	2 episodes
2011	Marchlands	Helen Maynard	Miniseries
2012	Upstairs Downstairs	Dr. Blanche Mottershead	5 episodes
2012	Who Do You Think You Are?	Herself	Episode: "Alex Kingston"
2012	NCIS	Miranda Pennebaker	Episode: "Gone"
2013–2016	Arrow	Dinah Lance	7 episodes
2014	Chasing Shadows	Ruth Hattersley	Miniseries
2015	American Odyssey	Jennifer Wachtel	2 episodes
2016, 2021	Blue Bloods	Commander Sloane Thompson	2 episodes
2016	Transformers: Rescue Bots	Quickshadow (voice)	5 episodes
2016	Shoot the Messenger	Mary Foster	8 episodes
2016	Gilmore Girls: A Year in the Life	Naomi Shropshire	Miniseries
2016	Crushed	Cricket Stella	Unaired Hulu pilot
2017	Penn Zero: Part-Time Hero	Vlurgen (voice)	Episode: "Mr. Rippen"
2018–2022	A Discovery of Witches	Sarah Bishop	20 episodes
2019	The Widow	Judith Gray	8 episodes
2022	Dodger	Lucifer	2 episodes
2022	Treason	Audrey Gratz	5 episodes
2024	Douglas Is Cancelled	Sheila	Main role
2025	The Chelsea Detective	Ambassador Emily Morgan	Episode: "Deadlock"
2025	Strictly Come Dancing	Herself	Contestant; Series 23
2026	Secret Service	Rose Trewen	5 episodes

=== Radio ===
Year	Title	Role	Production	Notes
1992	Père Goriot	Delphine / Victorine	BBC Radio 4	Four-part dramatisation
1994	John Dollar	Charlotte	BBC Radio 3	Self-adapted by author Marianne Wiggins
2006	Rebecca	Narrator	BBC Radio 2	Abridged eight-part version
2007	Murder She Thought	Narrator	BBC Radio 4	Story: "Dear George" by Cathy Ace
2014	Antony and Cleopatra	Cleopatra	BBC Radio 3	Two-and-a-half-hour adaptation starring Kenneth Branagh
2021	Nuremberg	Madeleine Jacob	BBC Radio 4	Story: "He Pointed to the Sky" by Jonathan Myerson

=== Audio ===
Year	Title	Role	Production	Notes
2007	Mary Stuart	Mary Stuart	L.A. Theatre Works	Recorded before an audience at the Skirball Cultural Center
2010	Tartuffe	Elmire	L.A. Theatre Works	Recorded at The Invisible Studios, West Hollywood
2012	The Angel's Kiss: A Melody Malone Mystery	Narrator	AudioGO	
2015–2023	The Diary of River Song	River Song	Big Finish Productions	Series 1–12
2016	Five Short Stories by Women	Narrator	L.A. Theatre Works	Story: "Once Upon a Time"
2016–2017	Doom Coalition	River Song	Big Finish Productions	5 stories
2017	Seven	Inez McCormack	L.A. Theatre Works	Recorded before an audience at the James Bridges Theater
2020	Peter Pan	Narrator	Penguin Audio	
2019	The Eighth of March	River Song	Big Finish Productions	Story: "Emancipation"
2019	Ravenous	River Song	Big Finish Productions	Story: "Companion Piece"
2019	UNIT: The New Series	River Song	Big Finish Productions	Story: "The Power of River Song"
2019	Transference	Sam Ross	Big Finish Productions	Non-Doctor Who eight-part psychological thriller
2019	The Legacy of Time	River Song	Big Finish Productions	Story: "Lies in Ruins"
2019	The Other Queen	Narrator	Simon & Schuster Audio	
2020	The Lives of Captain Jack	River Song	Big Finish Productions	Story: "R&J"
2020	Arkham County	Henrietta	Audible	Original seven-hour drama with Stanley Tucci in the lead role
2020	The Tenth Doctor and River Song	River Song	Big Finish Productions	3 stories
2021	A Narrow Door	Narrator	Orion Books	
2021	Doctor Who: The Ruby's Curse	Narrator	AudioGO	Also writer
2021	Dalek Universe	River Song	Big Finish Productions	Story: "The First Son"
2022	Peladon	River Song	Big Finish Productions	Story: "The Poison of Peladon"
2022	Marple: Twelve New Mysteries	Narrator	HarperAudio	Story: "Evil in Small Places"
2023	Doctor Who: Once and Future	River Song	Big Finish Productions	Story "The Union"
2024-2027	The Ninth Doctor Adventures	River Song	Big Finish Productions	Volume 4: "Star-Crossed"
2024-2027	The Life and Death of River Song	River Song	Big Finish Productions	

=== Video games ===
Year	Title	Role
2012	Doctor Who: The Eternity Clock	River Song (voice)

== Stage work ==
Year	Title	Role	Venue
—N/a	The Idiot	Nastasya Filippovna	Contact Theatre
1986	The Alchemist	Dol Common	Birmingham Repertory Theatre
1987	Julius Caesar	Culpurnia	Birmingham Repertory Theatre
1987	Travelling Players	Mad Ophelia	Birmingham Repertory Theatre
1988	Saved	Pam	Birmingham Repertory Theatre
1988	French Without Tears	Diana Lake	Leicester Haymarket Theatre
1988	The Tutor	Fraulien Muller	Old Vic Theatre
1989	'Tis A Pity She's A Whore	Hippolita	Dukes Playhouse
1989	The Country Wife	Marjorie Pinchwife	Dukes Playhouse
1990–1991	King Lear	Cordelia	Royal Shakespeare Company
1990–1991	Much Ado About Nothing	Hero	Royal Shakespeare Company
1990–1991	Love's Labours Lost	Jaquenetta	Royal Shakespeare Company
1991	Curse of the Starving Class	Emma	Royal Shakespeare Company
1991–1992	The Bright and Bold Design	Grace Rhys	Royal Shakespeare Company
1992	Bad Blood	Dolores	Gate Theatre
1992	A Midsummer Night's Dream	Titania / Hippolyta	Crucible Theatre
1993	Othello	Desdemona	Birmingham Repertory Theatre
1994	Darwin's Flood	Emma Darwin	Bush Theatre
1995	Morning and Evening	Cecilie / Johanne	Hampstead Theatre
1996	The Lady From The Sea	Ellida Wangel	Bridewell Theatre
2006	One Flew Over The Cuckoos Nest	Nurse Rachet	Garrick Theatre
2011	Luise Miller	Lady Milford	Donmar Warehouse
2013	Macbeth	Lady Macbeth	Manchester International Festival
2014	Macbeth	Lady Macbeth	Park Avenue Armory
2019	Admissions	Sherri Rosen-Mason	Trafalgar Theatre
2019	An Enemy of the People	Dr. Stockmann	Nottingham Playhouse
2021	Doctor Who: Time Fracture	River Song	Immersive LDN
2022	The Fall	Dr. Greta Portius	Riverside Studios
2023	The Tempest	Prospero	Royal Shakespeare Company
2026	Copenhagen	Margrethe	Hampstead Theatre

== Awards and nominations ==
Year	Award	Category	Work	Result
1997	British Academy Television Awards	Best Actress	The Fortunes and Misfortunes of Moll Flanders	Nominated
1998	Screen Actors Guild Awards	Outstanding Performance by an Ensemble in a Drama Series (shared with the cast)	ER	Won
1999	Screen Actors Guild Awards	Outstanding Performance by an Ensemble in a Drama Series (shared with the cast)	ER	Won
2000	Screen Actors Guild Awards	Outstanding Performance by an Ensemble in a Drama Series (shared with the cast)	ER	Nominated
2001	Screen Actors Guild Awards	Outstanding Performance by an Ensemble in a Drama Series (shared with the cast)	ER	Nominated
2008	Doctor Who Magazine Awards	Best Guest Actress	Doctor Who (episodes: "Silence in the Library" / "Forest of the Dead")	Won
2009	TV Land Awards	Icon Award	ER	Won
2010	Airlock Alpha Portal Awards	Best Special Guest	Doctor Who (episode: "Time of Angels")	Won
2010	Doctor Who Magazine Awards	Best Supporting Actress	Doctor Who	Won
2011	Airlock Alpha Portal Awards	Best Special Guest	Doctor Who (episode: "Day of the Moon")	Nominated
2012	SFX Awards	Best Actress	Doctor Who	Won
2012	Airlock Alpha Portal Awards	Best Special Guest	Doctor Who (episode: "Let's Kill Hitler")	Nominated
2013	Anglophenia's Fan Favorites Women's Tournament	Woman of the Year	—N/a	Won
2013	Manchester Theatre Awards	Best Actress	Macbeth	Nominated
2015	Saturn Awards	Best Guest Performance in a Television Series	Doctor Who (episode: "The Husbands of River Song")	Nominated

== Bibliography ==
Novels

- Doctor Who: The Ruby's Curse (2021) ISBN 978-1-78594-713-1
