= The Fortunes and Misfortunes of Moll Flanders =

- Created by: Dominic Minghella
- Screenplay by: Andrew Davies
- Starring: Alex Kingston; Daniel Craig; Diana Rigg
- Theme music composer: Jim Parker
- Country of origin: United Kingdom
- Original language: English
- No. of series: 1
- No. of episodes: 4

Production
- Producers: David Lascelles, Gub Neal, Rebecca Eaton
- Running time: 51 mins (4 episodes)
- Production companies: Granada Television; WGBH Boston

Original release
- Network: ITV
- Release: 1 December – 9 December 1996

The Fortunes and Misfortunes of Moll Flanders is a 1996 British drama television film directed by David Attwood, with a screenplay by Andrew Davies and starring Alex Kingston. It is an adaptation of the novel Moll Flanders by Daniel Defoe.

== Synopsis ==
Moll is born in Newgate to a convict woman, who is transported immediately after giving birth. After being passed around, the child ends up with gypsies, from whom she runs away when about seven years old. She is taken in by the Mayor of Colchester and brought up in his household as "almost" one of the family. When they become young men, both his sons are attracted to Moll and make advances to her.

She succumbs to the eldest son, who promises her love and marriage and gives her money and presents, but then encourages her to marry his younger brother when the latter proposes to her. The parents are concerned but allow the marriage. After several years Moll's husband dies and she leaves Colchester and her children to seek a new and more exciting life in London. She mixes in society and finally marries a wealthy young man who has come into an inheritance. Intoxicated with each other and spending money for their enjoyment, Moll and her new husband live a reckless and extravagant lifestyle.

Her husband having disappeared after they have spent his fortune and the bailiffs arrive, Moll puts on her finery and goes in search of another wealthy husband. She attracts a young sea Captain from Virginia, who owns a ship and plantations and she too is attracted to him. They marry and Moll travels with him to Virginia. There she meets his mother, who, after some initial hostility to Moll gets on well with her.

Several years later, and now with two children, Moll's contentment and happiness is destroyed when she discovers that her mother-in-law is actually her own transported mother and that she is married to her own half-brother. He and Moll separate and she returns to England. Most of her possessions are lost during bad storms and she arrives with little money. She spends all she has on clothes and creating the impression that she is a wealthy lady and goes to Lancaster, Lancashire in search of a new husband - attracting one instantly.

Moll marries the love of her life, but after setting off on their honeymoon they soon discover that neither has been telling the truth. Alone and virtually penniless, Moll continues her life of crime. She meets fellow thief Lucy and they become partners in crime, lovers, and best friends. After Lucy is caught and hanged, Moll's heart is not in her thieving and she is easily caught.

== Episodes ==
=== Episode 1 ===
Moll is born in London's Newgate Prison to a woman awaiting transportation. No longer pregnant, the mother is immediately sent to the Colonies. Baby Moll is sold several times, ending up with a band of gypsies. She runs away as a child and is taken in by the Mayor of Colchester, to be raised as "almost one of the family". When she is 18, the eldest son, Rowland Richardson, seduces her with a promise of marriage. The younger son, Robin, actually offers marriage and they are wed.

Five years later, after Moll has borne him two children, he dies. Moll leaves the children with her in-laws and moves to London. She marries Daniel Dawkins, a young man who came into a rich inheritance from his father's drapery business. After running through all the money, plus what she had brought with her, her husband flees to France when the bailiffs come knocking on the door. Moll is left penniless and on her own.

=== Episode 2 ===
Moll travels to Kent, taking the name of Lady Flanders. She meets and weds a ship's captain, Lemuel. They sail to his home in Virginia. Moll bears him two children before accidentally discovering from her mother-in-law, Mrs. Golightly, that she and Lemuel are actually half-brother and sister. Moll returns to England, losing most of her possessions in a storm at sea. Arriving in Lancaster, she meets Mistress Seagrave who introduces Moll to her brother, James "Jemmie" Seagrave.

=== Episode 3 ===
Moll and Jemmie are married. Each discovers that the other is a fortune hunter. After spending the night with Moll, Jemmie abandons her. Moll takes the stage coach to London, which is robbed by Jemmie, who has become a highwayman. After sharing a passionate kiss he leaves and she continues her journey.

Moll falls under the protection of a banker, John Bland, a fellow passenger. After convincing him to divorce his adulterous wife, Moll marries him and bears him two children. The shock of his bank going under kills John. When the bailiffs show up at the door, Moll takes the children and as many valuables as she can carry and escapes. She leaves the children with her husband's relatives and finds lodging with Mrs. Riordan. Moll, starving, becomes a thief.

=== Episode 4 ===
Moll continues in her life of crime, taking on a partner, Lucy Diver. Once Lucy confesses to having feelings for Moll, more than for any man she’s ever met, they start a sexual relationship.

Lucy is later caught and hanged for her crimes. Moll is eventually caught robbing a drapery store. She is taken to Newgate and sentenced to hang for her crimes. She claims to be pregnant so is given a stay of execution of one month. Jemmie has been caught and is brought to the prison. They are allowed an hour together during which time Moll tells Jemmie to ask for transportation before he is brought up in court. She gives him a snuff box belonging to Sir Richard Gregory and asks Jemmie to take it to Sir Richard.

Jemmie is to tell him that Moll Flanders needs his help, or Sir Richard's wife will hear about Moll's sexual relationship with her husband. Jemmie appears in court and is sentenced to transportation to Virginia. Moll's sentence is to hang. As the noose is around her neck, Jemmie rides up and shouts that her sentence has been commuted to transportation. She and Jemmie sail together to Virginia. There "Sir James and Lady Molly Seagrave became very rich and well respected citizens..."

== Cast and characters ==
Actor	Character
Alex Kingston	Moll Flanders
Daniel Craig	James 'Jemmy' Seagrave
Diana Rigg	Mrs. Golightly
Nicola Walker	Lucy Diver

== VHS release ==
The four episodes were released on VHS as two tapes in October 1997.
