= Love & Distrust =

- DVD cover
- Directed by: Lorraine Bracco; Daisy Gili; Eric Kmetz; Warner Loughlin; Diana Valentine; Darcy Yuille
- Screenplay by: Ian Beck
- Produced by: Robert Stio; Adam Dolman; Denice Bitidis; Brunson Green; Anna MacDonald; Mollye Stein; Barbara King; Tate Taylor
- Starring: Robert Pattinson; Amy Adams; Sam Worthington; Robert Downey Jr. James Franco
- Cinematography: Peter Agliata; Edward Button; Rick Gunter; Shawn Landis; Alex Ryle; Gareth Tillson
- Edited by: Maureen Murphy
- Music by: Vivek Maddala; Misha Segal; Simon Whiteside; Matteo Zingales
- Release date: November 2, 2010
- Running time: 93 minutes
- Country: United States
- Language: English

Love & Distrust is a 2010 direct-to-video romance film starring Robert Pattinson, Amy Adams, Sam Worthington, Robert Downey Jr. and James Franco. The movie includes 5 unique short films, following eight individuals from diverse backgrounds on their quest for true contentment.

== Plot ==
=== The Summer House (Obsession & Suspicion) ===
The story follows Jane as she flees from England to France to stay with her aunt after her boyfriend Richard dumps her for another girl. However, he follows her to the summer house to try to win her back and, on the night of the Moon landing, tries to make his move, unsuccessfully.

=== Blue Poles (Suspicion & Sincerity) ===
Libby is a young woman who struggles within herself during a time of "coming of age". She is split between commitments, responsibilities, desires and trying to make sense of it all. After stopping Miles, a country guy driving to Canberra to see the Blue Poles, and spending some time with him, she ultimately moves forward on her own.

=== Grasshopper (Sincerity & Doubt) ===
The tragic story of two people fighting to break down the walls which stand in the way of human communication. Travis hides behind technology, such as cell phones and computers, to avoid emotional interaction with others. Terri hides behind make-up, high heels and prostitution to avoid emotional interaction with others. Their lives intersect for a brief evening when Terri finds Travis' phone, which he left behind on a train. This accident brings them together, but by the end of the evening, Terri commits suicide, leaving a photo of her underage daughter.

=== Pennies (Doubt & True Love) ===
Charlotte Brown is a waitress and young single mother who will do anything for her daughter Jenny, and when push comes to shove, she does. With a menacing figure on the other end of the phone and a time limit of two hours, she must raise enough money to ensure that she sees the smiling face of her child again. After dealing with a few very unusual customers through the day, Charlotte finally gets enough gratuity money, but it is taken at gunpoint. Finally a tip from an honest customer comes just in time to pay for her daughter's entry in a talent competition with Pennies from Heaven.

=== Auto Motives (True Love & False Hope) ===
The impacts of certain decisions we make very easily but which are hard to follow through.

== Cast ==
=== The Summer House ===
(directed by Daisy Gili)

- Robert Pattinson as Richard
- Talulah Riley as Jane
- David Burke as Freddie
- Anna Calder-Marshall as Priscilla
- Marianne Borgo as Marie Pierre
- Laurence Beck as Nico

=== Blue Poles ===
(directed by Darcy Yuille)

- Sam Worthington as Miles
- Mungo McKay as Bill
- Hallie Shellam as Libby
- Emma Randall as Sylvia
- Charlie Kevin as Luke

=== Grasshopper ===
(directed by Eric Kmetz)

- James Franco as Travis
- Rachel Miner as Terri
- Brad Light as Ted
- Dawn Anderson as Rail Passenger
- Rian Bishop as Rail Passenger
- Michael Patrick Breen as Rail Passenger
- Tanika Brown McKelvy as Ticket Attendant
- Jim Donald Ellis as Charlie
- Kristen Endow as Rail Passenger
- Keisuke Hoashi as Bartender
- Jerry Hoffman as Station Agent
- Jasen Salvatore as Rail Passenger
- Marcus Wynnycky as Rail Passenger

=== Pennies ===
(directed by Warner Loughlin and Diana Valentine)

- Amy Adams as Charlotte Brown
- Carol Stanzione as Rosa
- David Reivers as The Man
- Jason Leiberman as Julio
- Travis Miljan as Old Woman
- Ronnie Schell as Mr. Tinker
- Cerina Vincent as Kimberly
- Curtis C. as Sgt. Hillard
- James Karr as Crazy
- Ron Ostrow as Mr. Stevens
- Zack Ward as Stoner Todd
- Darren Le Gallo as Cowboy Jim
- Mark Kiely as Dad

=== Auto Motives ===
(directed by Lorraine Bracco)

- Robert Downey Jr. as Rob
- James Cameron as himself
- Scott Gorman as Scott
- Josh Hopkins as Nigel
- Michael Imperioli as Stud
- Allison Janney as Grechen
- Melissa McCarthy as Tonnie
- Jim Rash as Accountant
- Michael Ruotolo as Italian Kid
- Octavia Spencer as Rhonda
- Tate Taylor as Dusty
- Moon Unit Zappa as Donna
