= Scottish Mussel =

- Directed by: Talulah Riley
- Written by: Talulah Riley
- Story by: Doug Milburn; Talulah Riley (uncredited)
- Produced by: Noel Clarke; Jason Maza; Phil Dore
- Starring: Martin Compston; Talulah Riley; Joe Thomas; Rufus Hound; Russell Kane; Harry Enfield
- Production company: Unstoppable Entertainment
- Distributed by: Bull Dog Film Distribution
- Release date: 26 June 2015 (Edinburgh)
- Running time: 94 minutes
- Country: United Kingdom
- Language: English
- Budget: $5 million

Scottish Mussel is a 2015 comedy film, written and directed by Talulah Riley that revolves around the life of a Glaswegian criminal, Ritchie (Martin Compston), who becomes interested in poaching freshwater pearl mussels from rivers in the Highlands of Scotland. During the course of his criminal enterprise, he falls in love with Beth, played by Riley, who is a conservationist from England.

The closing title song, which does not appear on the film soundtrack is called "So Beautiful" by Leeds-based band The Dunwells.

== Synopsis ==
Beth is an upper-class conservationist who is in Scotland to protect the freshwater pearl mussel from poachers who prise open the mussels and kill them for the pearls inside. Ritchie falls in love with Beth when he sees her emerging from a river in a bikini. Thereafter, he finds it harder to engage in illegal pearl poaching and slowly starts to learn all the wildlife in the area to get closer to Beth. Against this, they must fight off Glaswegian criminals and Ukrainian gangsters.

== Cast ==
- Martin Compston as Ritchie
- Talulah Riley as Beth
- Morgan Watkins as Ethan
- Joe Thomas as Danny
- Paul Brannigan as Fraser
- Emun Elliott as Leon
- James Dreyfus as the headmaster
- Rachael Stirling as Miss Pringle
- Marianna Palka as Fiona
- Camille Coduri as Aunt Nettie
- Stephen O'Donnell as Gavin
- Neil Greig Fulton as Murray
- Ryan Gage as Ramsey
- Rufus Hound as PC Dougie
- Russell Kane as Sinclair
- Harry Enfield as Bill

== Production ==
The film is set in the Scottish Highlands region, but most of the production was filmed in and around Dunoon, in Argyll and Bute, with some scenes filmed in Glasgow.

== Critical reception ==
Almost all reviews were negative about the film; James Luxford, writing in the Radio Times said: "All the jokes miss the mark as well even though, surrounding the couple, are familiar faces in comedy including Harry Enfield and Russell Kane. Mostly, the supporting cast do horrendous accents and contribute little to the plot. Listless from start to end, there is nothing to be salvaged from this dreadful Highland fling." Similarly, David Kettle said: "What Riley seems to be aiming for is a Pride- or even Brassed Off-style feelgood UK romcom-with-a-message. But with its broad, scattergun humour, lazy characterisation and inept plot and dialogue (not to mention its patronising, metropolitan view of "wild" Scotland), Scottish Mussel should have stayed firmly locked in its shell."

Robert Peacock, writing for the Wee Review, said: "Cliché-heavy conservationist comedy seeks to emulate feel good British films of yesteryear. Fails."

== See also ==
- Cinema of Scotland
