= Keisuke Hoashi =

American actor

- Born: New York City, New York, United States
- Years active: 1991−present

Keisuke Hoashi is an American stage, film and television actor, playwright, screenwriter and film producer of Japanese descent.

== Background ==
Hoashi attended Stuyvesant High School in New York City, including three summers (1982–85) at the New York State Music Camp, before attending the Crane School of Music. He retired from music at 20, and became an alumnus of Troy, New York's Rensselaer Polytechnic Institute, receiving his M.A. in 1993 in technical communication with a graphics certificate. He then moved to Los Angeles and became the NCR Corporation's first multimedia designer. He left NCR in 1998 to become a full-time actor. In 2005 he returned to Oneonta, New York as musical theatre instructor for the Hartwick College Summer Music Festival.

== Career ==
=== Theater ===
In 1993, he was cast as a bumbling Japanese businessman in a college production of Anything Goes. In 1998, Hoashi starred in the lead role of Onizuka in Onizuka, Kona's Son, an unsuccessful musical play about U.S. astronauts. In 2000, Hoashi created the world's first martial arts musical comedy play, "Memoirs of a Ninja", for which he won five Maddy Awards, five Garland Award nominations, and was honored as being among "The Best of Theatre 2000" by NiteLife After Dark magazine. He earned another Maddy Award for his portrayal of "Sakini" in "The Teahouse of the August Moon" for FireRose Productions.

=== Television and film ===
Hoashi's television appearances include Glee, Mad Men, iCarly: iGo to Japan, The King of Queens, Bob's Burgers and Hawthorne. He played a Japanese reporter in the film The Princess Diaries 2. In 2006 he wrote, produced, and starred in the television movie Cooking Kids.

=== Music camp ===
In 2006, he co-founded the New York Summer Music Festival music camp in Oneonta, New York, and is current director of communications and media, head of the camp's writing & acting program, and resident actor. His narration was featured at the 2010 New York Summer Music Festival's "The Lady Is a Song" concert, starring Ann Hampton Callaway.

== Filmography ==
=== Television ===
- Frank Leaves for the Orient (1 episode, 1999) as Zen-O-Phonics Man
- The Amanda Show (1 episode, 2000) as Sailer
- Strong Medicine (1 episode, 2001) as Hematologist
- Sabrina, the Teenage Witch (1 episode, 2001) as Delivery Man
- The Man Show (1 episode, 2001) as Crack Spackle Man
- The District (1 episode, 2002) as Dr. Becktel
- America's Most Wanted: America Fights Back (1 episode, 2002) as Boyfriend
- The Bernie Mac Show (1 episode, 2003) as Soccer Dad
- Coupling (1 episode) as Sushi Chef
- Yes, Dear (1 episode, 2003) as Bob
- Dr. Vegas (1 episode, 2004) as Patron
- Boston Legal (1 episode, 2005) as Police Technician
- The King of Queens (1 episode, 2005) as Phil Matsumoto
- How I Met Your Mother (1 episode, 2005) as Doctor
- Jake in Progress (1 episode, 2006) as Doctor
- The Suite Life of Zack & Cody (1 episode, 2006) as Singing Pizza Waiter
- Cooking Kids (2006) as Chef
- Drake & Josh (1 episode, 2006) as Hospital Administrator
- Them (2007) as Detective
- The Singles Table (1 episode, 2007) as ER Doctor
- Las Vegas (1 episode, 2007) as Alan Marshall
- The Wedding Bells (1 episode, 2007) as Studio Technician
- Viva Laughlin (1 episode, 2007) as Felix Wang
- Notes from the Underbelly (1 episode, 2007) as Home Sushi Chef
- iCarly: iGo to Japan (2008) as Security Chief
- Rita Rocks (1 episode, 2008) as Court Baliff
- Castle (1 episode, 2009) as Mr. Lee
- Hawthorne (2 episodes, 2009) as Dr. Mazaki
- Entourage (1 episode, 2009) as Club Official
- Better Off Ted (1 episode, 2009) as Scientist
- Monk (1 episode, 2009) as First Cop
- Heroes (2 episodes, 2010) as Japanese Cop
- Parenthood (1 episode, 2010) as Arnold Lee
- Glee (1 episode, 2010) as Peter 'Chainsaw' Gow
- The Young and the Restless (1 episode, 2010) as Mr. Yunioshi
- Mad Men (1 episode, 2010) as Hachi Saito
- Bob's Burgers (4 episodes, 2015 - 2021) as Shinji Kojima and Mr. Kim

=== Film ===
- Love, Ltd. (2000) as Mr. Lee
- Zombie Rights! (2003) as Dr. Zombie
- The Matrices (2003) as The Director
- The Princess Diaries 2: Royal Engagement (2004) as Japanese Reporter
- Dating Games People Play (2005) as Japanese man
- Grasshopper (2006) as Bartender
- Target Audience 9.1 (2007) as Dr. K
- The Poughkeepsie Tapes (2007) as Dai Loung
- Half-Life (2008) as Field Reporter
- Eggbaby (2009) as Mr. Chin
- Love & Distrust (2010) as Bartender
- Adultolescence (2010) as Tim Chen
- Godzilla Minus One (2023) as Additional voices (English dub)
- Bullet Train Explosion (2025) as Shinnosuke Yoshimura (English dub)

=== Video games ===
- Ghost of Tsushima (2020) as Ippei the Monk
- Cyberpunk 2077 (2020) as Angel/various

== Recognition ==
Of Hoashi's performance in Anything Goes, the Daily Gazette claimed he was miscast, writing "Even when apparently seasick or drunk, Hoashi came across as intelligent and competent, not a befuddled, confused non-English-speaking Asian."

Of his original play, "Memoirs of a Ninja", NiteLite After Dark praised the production, writing "Hoashi's quirky lyrics and twirled-about concepts are a clever mix of fun, frolic and belly laughs with political, social, moral, ethical, and cynical commentary that hilariously sideswipe political correctness, stereotypes, traditional thinking, racism, sexism, ageism and every other 'ism' in between."
