= Forest of the Dead =

195b – "Forest of the Dead"
- Doctor Who episode

Cast
- Doctor: David Tennant – Tenth Doctor
- Companion: Catherine Tate – Donna Noble
- Others: Alex Kingston – Professor River Song; Colin Salmon – Dr Moon; Harry Peacock – Proper Dave; Steve Pemberton – Strackman Lux; Jessika Williams – Anita; O. T. Fagbenle – Other Dave; Eve Newton – The Girl; Mark Dexter – Dad; Jason Pitt – Lee; Eloise Rakic-Platt – Ella; Alex Midwood – Joshua; Talulah Riley – Miss Evangelista; Jonathan Reuben – Man

Production
- Directed by: Euros Lyn
- Written by: Steven Moffat
- Produced by: Phil Collinson
- Executive producers: Russell T Davies; Julie Gardner
- Music by: Murray Gold
- Production code: 4.10
- Series: Series 4
- Running time: 2nd of 2-part story, 45 minutes
- First broadcast: 7 June 2008

Chronology
← Preceded by "Silence in the Library"	Followed by → "Midnight"

"Forest of the Dead" is the ninth episode of the fourth series of the British science fiction television series Doctor Who. It was first broadcast on BBC One on 7 June 2008 and is the second of a two-part story; the first part, "Silence in the Library", aired on 31 May. It is the final story Moffat wrote until he replaced Russell T Davies as head writer and showrunner starting from the fifth series in 2010.

In the episode, the time-travelling companion Donna Noble is trapped inside a virtual reality in a planet-sized library's hard drive in the 51st century, and has false memories implanted of a married life. At the same time, the Tenth Doctor, who travels with Donna, seeks to rescue her and thousands of other humans saved inside the library hard drive, while being pursued by a microscopic swarm known as the Vashta Nerada. The episode also features the death of River Song, who goes on to become a recurring character in The Doctor's linear future. She is an archaeologist who has a close relationship with the Doctor, but because of the non-linearity of their lives, the Doctor in the episode has only just met River.

Forest of the Dead was watched by 7.84 million viewers. This came out to a 40% audience share, the highest in series 4. It received highly positive reviews, which praised Tate's performance and the character of River Song. This episode, along with "Silence in the Library", was nominated for the Hugo Award for Best Dramatic Presentation, Short Form.

== Plot ==
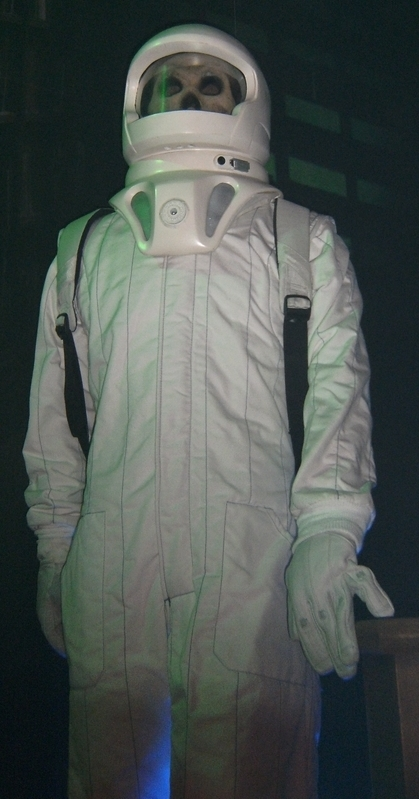
The Vashta Nerada inhabited suit as shown at the Doctor Who Experience.

The Tenth Doctor, River, Strackman Lux, and the remainder of their team flee the microscopic Vashta Nerada on the planet-sized Library. Other team members are consumed by the Vashta Nerada, with their space suits being animated by the swarms. During a respite, Lux explains that the Library, and a giant computer constructed at its core, was constructed by his grandfather for Lux's aunt, Charlotte, who was diagnosed with a terminal illness at a young age, to allow her mind to live on among the collected works of humankind. The Doctor realises Charlotte's mind is struggling to cope after "saving" the thousands of patrons by transferring their physical forms to the computer core 100 years ago when the Vashta Nerada attacked.

Within the simulation of a contemporary Earth village, Donna is tended to by Dr Moon (an avatar of the virus checker program) and introduced to Lee, whom she marries. Aware that time seems to be skipping, Donna is alerted by Miss Evangelista, one of River's team members killed by the Vashta Nerada, that she is in a simulation.

In the core, the Doctor learns from the Vashta Nerada that their forests were used to create the books of the Library, and so claim the Library as their own. The Vashta Nerada allow the Doctor one day to free the people trapped in the computer core, including Donna, after which the Library will belong to them. The Doctor prepares to hook himself to the computer terminal to provide the extra memory required to download everyone, aware this will likely kill him. River knocks him out and takes his place, insisting that the Doctor's death now would prevent her meeting him in her own past (due to their mismatched timelines).

The patrons stored inside the computer rematerialise on the Library surface, where they teleport away to safety. Lee is unable to call out to Donna as he leaves. As the Doctor and Donna leave behind River's diary and sonic screwdriver, the Doctor wonders why his future self would give River his screwdriver. He finds a data recorder inside the mechanism which has preserved River's thought pattern. The Doctor saves her pattern to the core. River wakes up in the Earth simulation and is greeted by Charlotte and River's team members who had fallen victim to the Vashta Nerada. Charlotte assures her that the simulation is now a "good place" where River will be safe.

== Production ==
=== Writing ===
This was the second two-parter written by Steven Moffat for the show, and the sixth episode written by him in total, after "The Empty Child"/"The Doctor Dances", "The Girl in the Fireplace", "Blink", and "Silence in the Library". "Forest of the Dead" was initially given the title "River's Run"; however, its name was changed relatively late in production (Radio Times, a major interviewer for the show and episode, had to use the previous title in their column due to the change being so late); in the end, the title was chosen by amalgamating two other suggested titles- "Forest of the Night" and "Return of the Dead". Josh and Ella, Donna's two children in the computer-generated world, were named after Steven Moffat's son and his son's friend, as the friend was a big fan of Doctor Who.

Most of the cast was shared between both episodes of the two-parter, except Donna's cyberspace husband Lee. In early drafts, Lee was supposed to be an overweight woman, the male version being how she imagined herself in cyberspace, with her stammer supposed to reveal her identity to the audience; Davies said the idea was subsequently dropped, being "too big a concept" for a brief moment.

Moffat had all the characters survive in some form, in line with his previous episodes, saying that the characters "sort of die", but end up "having a nice storyline"; he said that he felt that the future Doctor would have thought of something that would resolve the situation, and that if someone, like himself, does not believe that souls exist, "the characters are completely themselves, with nothing left behind", as their memories have been completely copied to the simulation.

=== Casting ===
The role of River Song, whom Davies described as "sort of the Doctor's wife", went to Alex Kingston. Kingston was not told her role was supposed to be recurring, learning only later that Moffat always intended for Song to come back for return appearances. Kingston said she enjoyed getting to play an unusual action hero female role. She said she felt a "warm bond" with Tennant and Tate, a sentiment that Tennant and Tate shared."

The role of Strackman Lux went to Steve Pemberton, who appeared in Blackpool with David Tennant. The roles of the other team members were given to newcomers.

=== Filming and effects ===
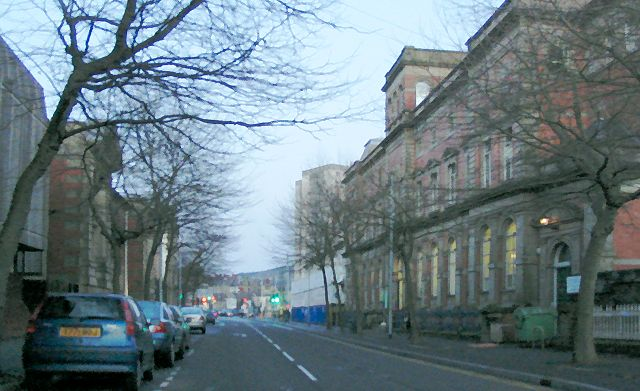
The Old Swansea Central Library to the right in the image

Filming for the two episodes had taken place in late January and early February 2008, with reshoots taking place in the middle of March. There were three key locations: Upper Boat Studios for the corridors, walkways and bookcase rooms in the Library, Brangwyn Hall for the entrances and under library and Old Swansea Central Library as the main set of the library.

Various new locations were also used for this episode; the climactic scenes of the episode, in the library's computer core, were filmed in an electrical substation of a disused Alcoa factory in Waunarlwydd, Swansea, scenes set in CAL's databanks were filmed at Dyffryn Gardens, St Nicholas; and outside shots were shot across Wales in location such as Palace Road, Victoria Park and Hensol Castle.

The presence of the Vashta Nerada was created with lighting managed by director of photography Rory Taylor. To draw the eye toward the shadows, they were deepened in post-production by visual effects company The Mill.

The wedding dress Catherine Tate wears in this episode is the same dress she wore in "The Runaway Bride".

== Broadcast and reception ==
=== Release ===
On 6 June, "Silence in the Library" was re-run on BBC3, and "Forest of the Dead" was broadcast on its usual timeslot on BBC1 on Saturday 7 June, running against coverage of the Canadian Grand Prix and Euro 2008 on ITV1; the episode came out the winner, getting more viewership than the football. Like previous episodes in the series, the episode was followed by an episode of Doctor Who Confidential.

=== Ratings ===
Forest of the Dead was watched by 7.84 million viewers, giving it a 40% audience share; the highest in Series Four and the highest in its timeslot. The episode received an Appreciation Index score of 89 (considered "Excellent"), one of the highest figures the new series had received to date, alongside "The Parting of the Ways", "Doomsday" and the preceding episode "Silence in the Library".

Following the two-parter, Davies praised Moffat, who was succeeding him as showrunner from the next series onwards. He said that Moffat brought "the best attributes" to Doctor Who, such as "intelligence and wit and fears and thrills and dynamism".

=== Critical reception and accolades ===
The episode received positive reviews from critics. The performance of Tate was heavily praised, along with that of Kingston and Tennant, and the emotional beats between the latter two. The Vashta Nerada, and the "emotional" ending were also praised. Some reviewers called the two-parter a highlight, and the best of the season.

Keith Phipps of A.V. Club, giving the episode an 'A-', stated that the episode centered "the emotional core of the Doctor", especially his scenes with River Song. Though he did not find the episode as satisfying as the first part, he still thought it was a "terrific" episode in isolation. SFX found “Forest of the Dead” to be a "beautiful contradiction" to "Silence in the Library". He praised the moment of River's self-sacrifice as a "beautiful and tragic" scene. Similarly, Patrick Mulkern of Radio Times found River Song to be an interesting character, and liked the "reams of brilliant ideas" in the episode.

Simon Brew of Den of Geek heavily praised the episode for its "complete" utilisation of characters and its "masterful" scripting. Ben Rawson-Jones from Digital Spy found that the episode used psychological fears to "brilliantly build" upon the opening; and praised the "stunning twist" on the concept of the parallel world. IGN's Travis Fickett found the moment of the Doctor lying in sadness after River Song's sacrifice to be one of the series' most emotional moments.

IGN named the two-parter the fourth best story of Tennant's tenure, calling it "a densely-plotted, labyrinthine story." They found it to be a creative and "moving" story. Radio Times named the two-parter Moffat's ninth best story, praising the "spectacular" cast, and calling the script "deliciously creepy" tying everything together. This episode, along with "Silence in the Library", was nominated for a Hugo Award in the Best Dramatic Presentation, Short Form category, but lost out to Dr. Horrible's Sing-Along Blog. The episode won the 2009 Constellation Award for Best Script in Film or Television.

== See also ==
- Simulated reality
