= Silence in the Library =

195a – "Silence in the Library"
- Doctor Who episode

Cast
- Doctor: David Tennant – Tenth Doctor
- Companion: Catherine Tate – Donna Noble
- Others: Alex Kingston – Professor River Song; Colin Salmon – Dr Moon; Eve Newton – CAL (The Girl); Mark Dexter – Dad; Sarah Niles – Node 1; Joshua Dallas – Node 2; Jessika Williams – Anita; Steve Pemberton – Strackman Lux; Talulah Riley – Miss Evangelista; O. T. Fagbenle – Other Dave; Harry Peacock – Proper Dave

Production
- Directed by: Euros Lyn
- Written by: Steven Moffat
- Produced by: Phil Collinson
- Executive producers: Russell T Davies; Julie Gardner
- Music by: Murray Gold
- Production code: 4.9
- Series: Series 4
- Running time: 1st of 2-part story, 45 minutes
- First broadcast: 31 May 2008

Chronology
← Preceded by "The Unicorn and the Wasp"	Followed by → "Forest of the Dead"

"Silence in the Library" is the eighth episode of the fourth series of the British science fiction television series Doctor Who. It was first broadcast on BBC One on 31 May 2008 and is the first of a two-part story; the second part, "Forest of the Dead", aired on 7 June. The two episodes make up the second two-parter Steven Moffat contributed to the series after "The Empty Child" and "The Doctor Dances" from the first series. It is also the final story Moffat wrote until he replaced Russell T Davies as head writer and showrunner starting from the fifth series in 2010.

In the episode, River Song (Alex Kingston), an archaeologist, summons alien time traveller the Tenth Doctor (David Tennant) to a planet-sized library in the 51st century, where thousands of visitors disappeared without a trace 100 years earlier when the library was shut off. The episode marks the first appearance of Alex Kingston as River Song, a role she would reprise in the next three series.

"Silence in the Library" was watched by 6.27 million viewers and received highly positive reviews. It was nominated, along with "Forest of the Dead", for the Hugo Award for Best Dramatic Presentation, Short Form.

== Plot ==
The Tenth Doctor and Donna land on a planet-sized library in the 51st century simply called the Library. The Doctor has been summoned there, but a scan for life shows the Doctor and Donna as the only humanoid life signs but trillions of nonhuman life forms they cannot see or hear are present. An information node tells the Doctor and Donna that the library sealed itself, but that it has been breached and others are coming.

Just then, a team of explorers led by archaeologist River Song (who sent the message) and financier Strackman Lux, whose grandfather originally built the Library, arrives. The team has come to determine why the library sealed itself 100 years previously. River somehow knows the Doctor, and has a diary with a cover decorated like the TARDIS with her. She discovers the Doctor has not met her yet in his personal time-line.

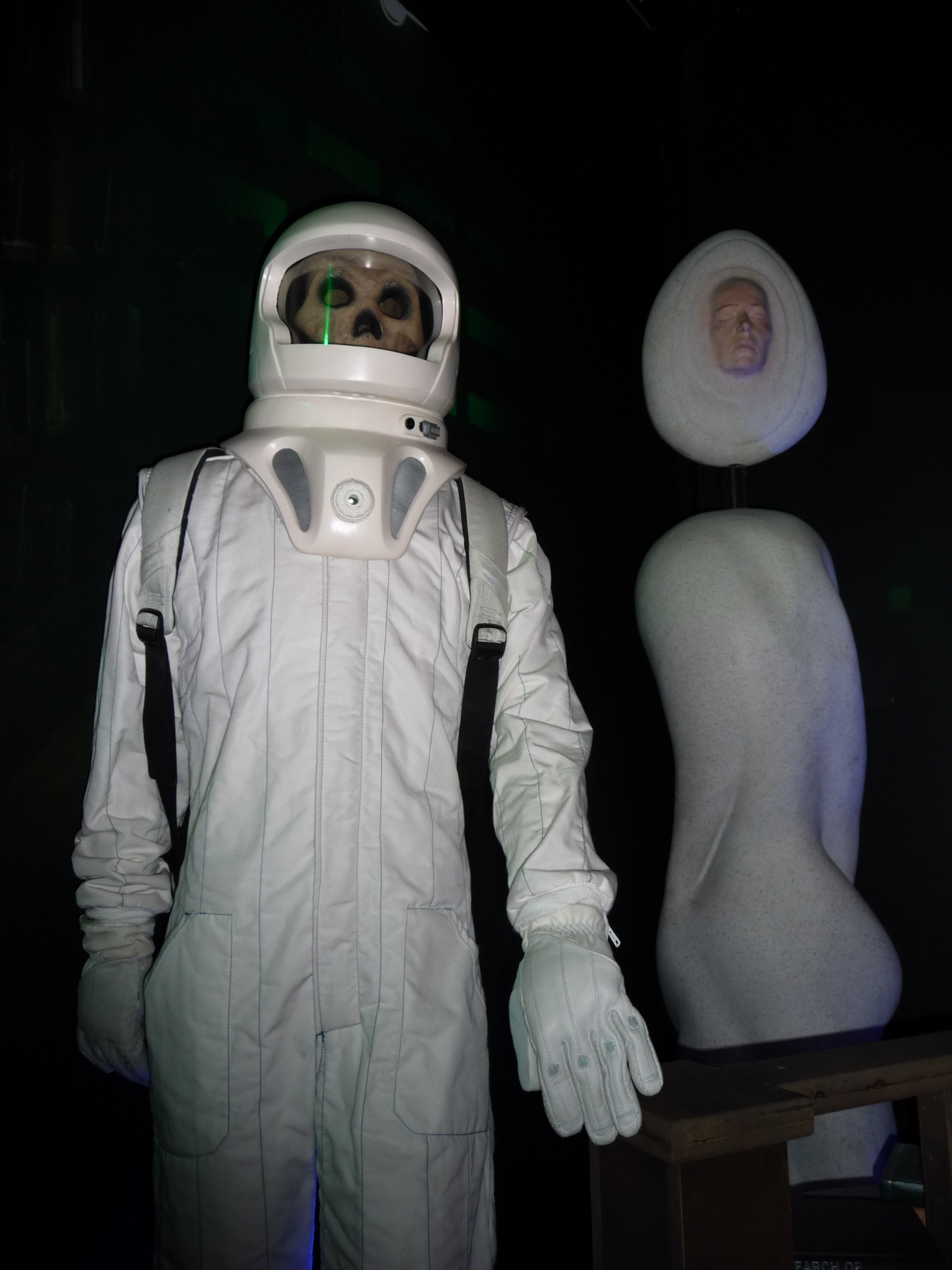
The Vashta Nerada inhabiting the suits of the dead explorers, and the information nodes, as shown at the Doctor Who Experience.

The Library's operation system appears to be connected to the mind of a young girl living on 21st-century Earth. When the Doctor attempts to access the library computers, the girl causes books to fly from the shelves. The events happening in the library appear to her as television shows. The girl's psychiatrist Dr Moon tells her that the library in her imagination is actually real and that her real world is a lie. He implores her to save the people who have arrived at the library.

Lux's secretary Miss Evangelista is attacked by Vashta Nerada which strip her flesh clean to the bone instantly. The Doctor and Donna learn that the team are wearing communication devices which can store their thought patterns even after death, and are disturbed to hear Miss Evangelista still talking but acting confused until her pattern degrades. The Doctor explains that the Vashta Nerada are creatures that appear as shadows to hunt but are usually not as aggressive.

After noticing the pilot Proper Dave has two shadows, the Doctor and River seal him in his space suit, with the Doctor discovering River has a sonic screwdriver. The Vashta Nerada still get in, stripping Dave to his bare skeleton. The creatures animate Dave's suit and chase after the others. The Doctor attempts to teleport Donna back to the TARDIS for her safety, but Donna fails to materialise properly. The Doctor finds an information node with Donna's face on it which tells him that Donna has left the library and been saved, as the Vashta Nerada close in.

== Production ==
=== Writing ===
Originally, the two-parter was scheduled to take place during the show's third series, with Moffat wanting to introduce the villainous Weeping Angels in the entry after seeing an angel statue in a graveyard whilst on a family holiday. However, after withdrawing from the writing of series three's first two-part story, Moffat volunteered to write the series' Doctor-lite episode and opted to use the Weeping Angels in what would become "Blink". Later, during the fourth series, Moffat revisited his previous ideas. He felt that the library would be a "great setting" for Doctor Who that was not too exotic. It was the second two-parter Moffat wrote for the show, and the fifth episode in total, after "The Empty Child"/"The Doctor Dances, "The Girl in the Fireplace" and "Blink".

The character of River Song was originally created for the plot to make more sense. Moffat knew that the team of archaeologists would have to trust the Doctor, but that the Doctor's psychic paper could not explain and convince the team why he had appeared in a sealed-off library. Therefore, Moffat intended for the Doctor to know one of the archaeologists. Later, he decided that this idea was too "dull", and instead opted to have one of them know him, but not have the Doctor know her yet (due to mismatched timelines), with hints that we will see and get to know her in future episodes.

A "squareness gun" was used by Song to help the party escape from the Vashta Nerada, just like the sonic blaster Jack Harkness (John Barrowman) uses, and which Rose Tyler dubbed with the same name, in the episode "The Doctor Dances". Moffat stated that it was intended to be the same suggesting it was left in the TARDIS after "The Parting of the Ways", and taken by Song in the Doctor's future.

=== Casting ===
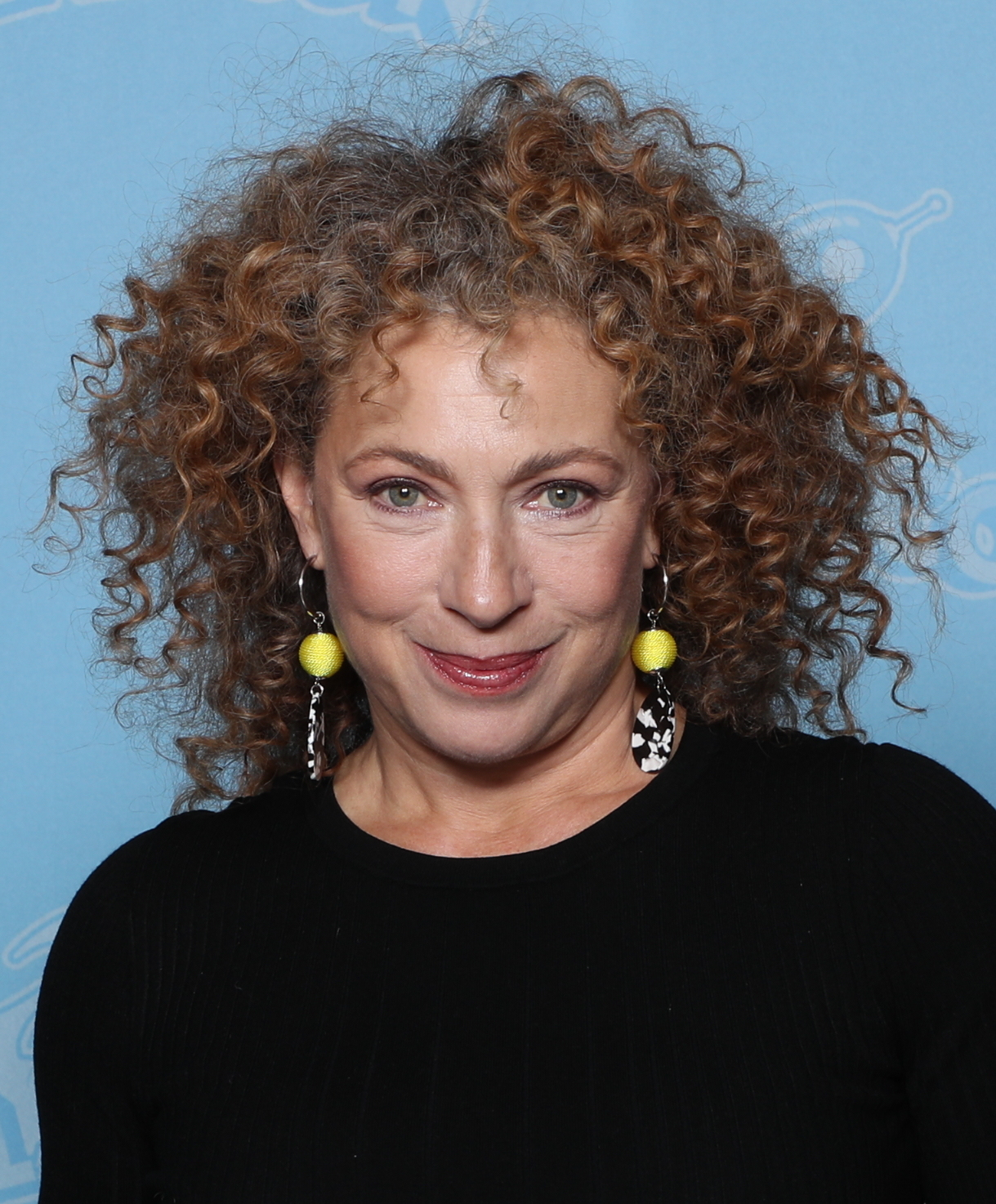
Alex Kingston played the role of River Song, a mysterious woman from the Doctor's future who he does not know yet.

For the role of River Song, whom executive producer Russell T Davies described as "sort of the Doctor's wife", the production sought to cast Kate Winslet. One of Winslet's first acting roles was in the BBC1 teen drama Dark Season, written by Davies. The role of River Song eventually went to Alex Kingston, who had starred in the US drama ER. On Kingston's casting, Davies said "I bloody love her!" Kingston had been a fan of Doctor Who as a child. Kingston was not told her role was supposed to be recurring, learning only later that Moffat always intended for Song to come back for return appearances.

Kingston enjoyed getting to play an unusual action hero female role, and praised the show for its variety of settings and opportunities "to relive one's childhood fantasies" playing with laser guns and wearing varied costumes from one appearance to the next. In regards to having to speak complicated dialogue, she said that unlike ER, "On Doctor Who, I've no idea what some of my lines mean!" Discussing her role alongside Tennant and Tate in her 2008 introductory episode, Kingston said, "We just clicked. I've done guest roles on other shows, but rarely have I felt such a warm bond", a sentiment that Tennant and Tate shared."

The role of Strackman Lux went to Steve Pemberton, who is best known for his work as a member of The League of Gentlemen. He also appeared in Blackpool with David Tennant. The roles of the other team members, being minor, went to newcomers, though care was taken to ensure that one could grasp instantly who everyone on the expedition was.

In 2020, Moffat revealed that he had envisioned Colin Salmon's character, Dr. Moon, as a future incarnation of the Doctor.

=== Filming and effects ===
Filming for the two episodes took place in late January and early February 2008, with reshoots taking place in the middle of March. Filming for the episode consisted of three key locations: Upper Boat Studios for the corridors, walkways and bookcase rooms in the Library, Brangwyn Hall for the entrances and under library and Old Swansea Central Library as the main set of the library.

The presence of the Vashta Nerada was created with lighting managed by director of photography Rory Taylor. To draw the eye toward the shadows, they were deepened in post-production by visual effects company The Mill. The establishing shots of the CGI cityscape of the Library was created in Cinema 4D using the Advanced Render 3 module. This effort was nominated for a VES Award in 2009.

== Broadcast and reception ==
=== Release ===
Before the episode was aired, The Sun obtained a copy of the script and threatened to release it, to which Moffat responded: "'let them' – I'd like to see The Sun publish that many words in a day!" On 16 May, similar to what they did for series 3 in 2007, the BBC announced that to avoid a clash with their coverage of the Eurovision Song Contest 2008, which took place on 24 May, no Doctor Who episode would air that day, but would instead be pushed back a week to 31 May. The week also saw the announcement of Moffat succeeding Davies as showrunner, in a BBC press release on 20 May.

=== Ratings ===
"Silence in the Library" was scheduled against the final of ITV's talent contest Britain's Got Talent and suffered in the ratings as a result. The episode recorded an audience of 6.27 million when adjusted for time shifting, whereas Britain's Got Talent was viewed by 11.52 million in comparison. This was the first time since the series' revival in 2005 that Doctor Who did not have the largest audience share in its timeslot. The episode received an Appreciation Index score of 89 (considered "Excellent"), the joint highest figure the new series had received to date, alongside "The Parting of the Ways", "Doomsday" and the following episode "Forest of the Dead". BBC Three's repeat of the episode was watched by 1.35 million viewers, almost double the figures for the equivalent repeat of the previous episode, "The Unicorn and the Wasp".

=== Critical reception and accolades ===
The episode received positive reviews from critics. Richard Edwards, reviewing for SFX, gave the episode five out of five stars and called it the "best of the series so far". He particularly praised the fear instilled by the Vashta Nerada and the "intriguing parallel plotline" of the little girl, and highlighted the "chilling and heartbreaking" plot device of the "Data Ghosts". Simililarly, Patrick Mulkern of Radio Times praised the two-parter as a collection of several brilliant ideas, with a backdrop of a child's virtual reality world, and the introduction of a mysterious woman from the Doctor's future. A.V. Club's Keith Phipps, giving it an 'A', found the episode "stellar", throwing one big idea after another, against a setting both mysterious and spooky due to the little girl and the Vashta Nerada respectively, ending on a big reveal and a thrilling cliffhanger, making viewers wait a week to unpack what they have seen.

IGN's Travis Fickett gave it a rating of 9.2 out of 10, praising the setting of a library with books and "terrifically entertaining dialogue, one mind boggling concept after another, terrific character moments" between all the characters. However, he thought the concept of the Vashta Nerada were "a bit goofy", especially when they took the form of the skeletons. Ben Rawson-Jones of Digital Spy gave "Silence in the Library" four out of five stars, praising the "wonderfully inventive concepts" of the Data Ghosts and Nodes as well as guest stars Kingston, Salmon, and Newton. However, his "slight criticism" was that some aspects were similar to other episodes Moffat had written for Doctor Who.

Den of Geek listed the cliffhanger for "Silence in the Library" among the ten greatest of the show in 2011, one which goes beyond menacing into "what is going on" territory for the viewers; and IGN named the two-parter one of the best episodes of Tennant's tenure. This episode, along with "Forest of the Dead", was nominated for a Hugo Award in the Best Dramatic Presentation, Short Form category, but lost out to Dr. Horrible's Sing-Along Blog. The episode won the 2009 Constellation Award for Best Script in Film or Television.
