= Welsh School of Architectural Glass =

The Welsh School of Architectural Glass is a department of Swansea Metropolitan University which offers BAs and MA courses in architectural stained glass.

The school was founded in 1935, when Howard Martin, who ran a glass company was invited by the Swansea Art College to run an evening class. The school has graduates working on cathedrals, theatres and public buildings all over the world.
