= The Hungry Earth =

Episode of Doctor Who

209a – "The Hungry Earth"
- Doctor Who episode
- Alaya talks to the Doctor. This episode featured redesigned Silurians, the reception of which was mixed.

Cast
- Doctor: Matt Smith – Eleventh Doctor
- Companions: Karen Gillan – Amy Pond; Arthur Darvill – Rory Williams
- Others: Neve McIntosh – Alaya; Meera Syal – Nasreen Chaudhry; Robert Pugh – Tony Mack; Nia Roberts – Ambrose; Alun Raglan – Mo; Samuel Davies – Elliot

Production
- Directed by: Ashley Way
- Written by: Chris Chibnall
- Produced by: Peter Bennett
- Executive producers: Steven Moffat; Piers Wenger; Beth Willis
- Music by: Murray Gold
- Production code: 1.8
- Series: Series 5
- Running time: 1st of 2-part story, 45 minutes
- First broadcast: 22 May 2010

Chronology
← Preceded by "Amy's Choice"	Followed by → "Cold Blood"

"The Hungry Earth" is the eighth episode of the fifth series of the British science fiction television series Doctor Who, which was first broadcast on 22 May 2010 on BBC One. It was written by Chris Chibnall, who had previously written for Doctor Who and its spin-off series, Torchwood. It is the first episode of a two-part story, the second episode being "Cold Blood", and features the return of the Silurians, a reptile-like humanoid race last seen in 1984's Warriors of the Deep.

In the episode a drilling operation headed by Nasreen Chaudhry (Meera Syal) in 2020 Wales is drilling deep into the earth and disrupting a civilisation of Silurians who dwell beneath the earth. In turn, the Silurians open holes in the ground to experiment on one villager, Mo (Alun Raglan), and hold Mo's son Elliot (Samuel Davies) hostage. After the Silurian Alaya (Neve McIntosh) is subdued in Wales, there is a stalemate between the two settlements as both sides have a hostage.

Executive producers Steven Moffat and Piers Wenger contacted Chibnall and asked him to write a two-part episode involving Silurians and a drill. Moffat wished to redesign the Silurians and worked together with Chibnall to create the idea of distinguishing prosthetics for their faces. Being in the fourth production block of the series, the episode was filmed in October and November 2009, with location filming in Llanwynno, Wales. McIntosh then returned in the series as a recurrent actress, portraying Madame Vastra, another Silurian character. The episode was watched by 6.49 million viewers on BBC One and BBC HD and received mixed reviews from critics. While some praised the horror, some noted that the story was very simplistic, and critics disagreed about the redesigned Silurians.

== Plot ==
In South Wales in 2020, a driller at a mining operation called Mo is pulled underground during the night shift. The Silurians, a race of reptilian humanoids and the owners of the Earth before humanity, did this by programming the ground with their technology. The following day, Amy is pulled underground on the same spot; the Eleventh Doctor assures her fiancé Rory that he will get her back. More than 21 kilometres underground, the warrior class of a Silurian tribe have been reawakened after millions of years. The village is blocked off by an energy barricade, and three Silurians use geothermal energy to reach the surface.

The Doctor and Rory subdue one of the Silurians, Alaya, while the other two retreat with Mo's son Elliot back into the earth; Mo's father-in-law Tony is wounded by Alaya's venomous tongue. The Doctor realises the Silurians have relented in their attack since both sides hold a hostage. Alaya believes, as do all Silurians, that the Earth still belongs to them, and that the drilling was an attack by the humans. The Doctor decides to travel in the TARDIS down the drilling shaft to talk to the rest of the Silurians and work out a truce; Nasreen Chaudhry, the leader of the drilling operation, accompanies him. The Silurians' technology pulls the TARDIS underground, but it falls out of the bottom of the tunnel system. The Doctor and Nasreen discover the Silurian settlement beneath the earth is an entire civilisation.

Amy awakens to find herself strapped to an examining table, near to where Mo is also ensnared. Mo explains that the Silurians "dissected" him, awake, (Note: As Mo is still alive, this would more accurately be called vivisection.) and will do the same to Amy.

== Production ==
=== Writing and casting ===
Steven Moffat contacted Chris Chibnall, asking him to return to writing for Doctor Who. Chibnall had previously written the Doctor Who episode "42" as well as episodes of the spin-off series Torchwood. Moffat and executive producer Piers Wenger gave him the brief of Silurians, a drill, and that it was a two-parter. The Silurians were villains who had previously appeared in the 1970 serial Doctor Who and the Silurians and the 1984 serial Warriors of the Deep. For research, Chibnall read the original novel Doctor Who and the Cave Monsters and watched the original serial, noting the freedom writer Malcolm Hulke took with the novel in things he could not have done in the television format. Chibnall wanted there to be a large Silurian city in contrast to the small human village on the surface. Knowing that the Silurians were not as popular and recurring as other villains, Moffat instructed Chibnall to bring the creatures to a new audience, and Chibnall decided to start out with knowing nothing about them and then introducing them in "the most exciting and scary way possible for people who've never seen them before". Chibnall also considered bringing back the Silurians' amphibious cousins the Sea Devils, but decided that doing two races of monster was much tougher and the story was "so clearly about the Silurians and what the Silurians want".

Chibnall, having enjoyed when the Doctor and his companion were separated, made the decision for Amy to be absent for most of the episode. Moffat also thought that, at the point in the middle of the series, it was appropriate to show the Doctor behave differently with other people. A deleted scene, parts of which were shown on the accompanying behind-the-scenes show Doctor Who Confidential, was filmed, depicting Amy discussing with the Doctor how she had seen herself with Rory ten years in the future, and if that would really happen.

With the absence of Amy, Chibnall thought that Nasreen became a "de facto companion". Meera Syal, who was cast as Nasreen, had been a fan of the series since childhood and had been trying to secure a role in the show since its revival in 2005 and was pleased when she received it. Syal described her character as "a very high-up, innovative geologist" who became good friends with the Doctor as the two admired each other's passion.

=== Filming and effects ===
Moffat wanted the Silurians to be redesigned and without their former third eye, as Davros also had a third eye and he wanted the Silurians to be "completely different". They were intended to be a different branch of the same species, and so the original Silurians still existed. Chibnall wrote for the redesigned Silurians to be beautiful and it was intended for the redesign to capture the actors' features and allow them to give stronger performances and differentiate themselves. Chibnall believed that it complemented the theme in the two-parter about how the humans and Silurians were alike and different. Due to the expensive prosthetics needed, extra Silurians wore face masks which prevented the need for every actor portraying a Silurian to receive the facial prosthetics. Chibnall also incorporated a poisonous tongue into the new branch of Silurians.

"The Hungry Earth" and the second part, "Cold Blood", made up the fourth production block of the series and were filmed in late October and November 2009 in the Upper Boat Studios and Llanwynno, Wales. In an interview, Syal stated that they did the location filming first. The drill itself was automatic and done by computer. For the scene in which Amy is dragged underneath the ground, Gillan stood on boxes and lowered herself into a stone compartment. Two pieces of rubber were at the opening of the compartment which expanded as she lowered herself down. A layer of soil was spread across the rubber; Gillan's ears were taped over to make sure the soil did not enter her ears. Gillan, initially scared at performing the stunt, put some of her fear and claustrophobia into the scene as she expected Amy felt the same way.

== Broadcast and reception ==
"The Hungry Earth" was first broadcast in the United Kingdom on BBC One on 22 May 2010 at 6:15 p.m. The time was earlier than usual to make way for the finale of Over the Rainbow, broadcast afterwards. Initial overnight ratings showed that the episode was watched by 4.39 million viewers on BBC One, a 30.8% audience share. Based on this figure, it was the lowest-rated episode since Doctor Who had returned to television in 2005. When final consolidated ratings were calculated, it was shown that the episode was watched by 6.49 million viewers; 6.01 on BBC One and an additional 0.48 million viewers on BBC HD. The episode was the ninth most-watched programme on the week ending Sunday 23 May 2010, and the 20th programme across all channels. The episode also received an Appreciation Index of 86, considered "excellent".

"The Hungry Earth" was released in Region 2 on DVD and Blu-ray on 2 August 2010 with the episodes "Amy's Choice" and "Cold Blood". It was then re-released as part of the Complete Fifth Series boxset on 8 November 2010.

=== Critical reception ===
The episode received mixed reviews from critics. Dan Martin, writing for The Guardian, said that the episode set up an "interesting quandary" but, although many elements were introduced, "not a lot actually seems to happen". He was also critical of the family members and found he did not care about any of them besides Elliot and Nasreen, and although the scene in which Amy was pulled into the ground was "effective and poignant", it left a lack of "Pond-life" in the rest of the episode. However, he did commend the prosthetics department for their redesigned Silurians.

Gavin Fuller of The Daily Telegraph was pleased that it "didn't disappoint" him. He praised the choice to show the Doctor's pacifism and Amy's few but memorable "nightmarish" scenes. However, he was not favourable to Meera Syal's performance and considered the Silurian's redesign too "radical and divorced" from their original appearance, most notably the absence of their third eye.

Patrick Mulkern of Radio Times gave the episode a positive review, saying that it felt "like proper, classic Doctor Who" in terms of "gripping storytelling, terrific pace, spooky direction, a grand idea...a small-scale Earth setting in the near future, characters worth caring about...plenty of meat for the three leads" and "a companion in real peril". He particularly praised the performances of Syal and Smith. He also enjoyed the Silurians' redesign, saying that the old ones "would...look ridiculous today". Though he "missed" the old voice from Peter Halliday, he said he adjusted to Neve McIntosh.

AOL TV reviewer Brad Trechak was positive towards the comparisons that could be made between conflicts throughout history to the human-Silurian conflict, but called the episode a "wasted opportunity". He felt that it was "more suspense and adventure than horror", wishing that it was scarier, and also commented that it was "very simplistic" and did not re-introduce the Silurians as well as it would have, had they been part of the overall storyline.

IGN's Matt Wales rated the episode 8 out of 10, assessing it as a "slender but satisfying success". He said that the narrative was "simplistic" without much depth, but that the "strong supporting cast" and "sympathetic characters" made it a "refreshingly involving tale". He also praised Smith's Doctor, who "delivered admirably" and carried out the show with the absence of Amy.

Ian Berriman for SFX magazine gave the episode three out of five stars, mainly displeased with the redesign of the Silurians, although he was positive toward their "venomous tongue lash" and costume. He also criticised the "clunky" scripting and questioned some technical aspects. However, he praised the scene of Amy being dragged into the earth, as well as Alaya's hunt for Elliot in the graveyard and the interaction between the Doctor and Elliot.
