= Amy's Choice =

Episode of British TV series

208 – "Amy's Choice"
- Doctor Who episode

Cast
- Doctor: Matt Smith – Eleventh Doctor
- Companions: Karen Gillan – Amy Pond; Arthur Darvill – Rory Williams
- Others: Toby Jones – The Dream Lord; Nick Hobbs – Mr Nainby; Joan Linder – Mrs Hamill; Audrey Ardington – Mrs Poggit

Production
- Directed by: Catherine Morshead
- Written by: Simon Nye
- Produced by: Tracie Simpson
- Executive producers: Steven Moffat; Piers Wenger; Beth Willis
- Music by: Murray Gold
- Production code: 1.7
- Series: Series 5
- Running time: 45 minutes
- First broadcast: 15 May 2010

Chronology
← Preceded by "The Vampires of Venice"	Followed by → "The Hungry Earth"

"Amy's Choice" is the seventh episode of the fifth series of the British science fiction television series Doctor Who. It first broadcast on BBC One on 15 May 2010. It was written by sitcom writer Simon Nye and directed by Catherine Morshead.

In the episode, the Eleventh Doctor, a time travelling alien played by Matt Smith, and his human travelling companions Amy (Karen Gillan) and Rory (Arthur Darvill), are in a trap set by the mysterious "Dream Lord" (Toby Jones), wherein they repeatedly fall asleep and wake up in a different reality. In one, Amy and Rory are happily married but pursued by elderly people possessed by aliens, while in another they are on board the Doctor's time machine, the TARDIS, where they anticipate being frozen to death by a nearby astronomical phenomenon. They must decide which is the real reality and die in the dream, to wake up in reality and escape the trap. At the episode's conclusion, the Dream Lord is ultimately revealed to be a manifestation of the Doctor's dark side and self-loathing.

Nye wrote the episode to explore and to test Amy's relationships with both the Doctor and Rory. Showrunner Steven Moffat suggested that Nye, a comedy writer by trade, build the episode around a split dream concept, and encouraged Nye to create a "monster" for the episode, which influenced his writing of the retirement home dream. The dream scenes in Amy and Rory's village were filmed in Skenfrith, Wales, and used CGI and prosthetics. "Amy's Choice" was seen by 7.55 million viewers on BBC One and BBC HD. The most positive critic reviews praised the episode's surrealism and commended it as one of the year's strongest scripts, but other reviewers felt the episode's horror or monsters unsatisfying.

== Plot ==
=== Synopsis ===
The Eleventh Doctor, Amy, and Rory find themselves flickering between two realities, falling asleep at the sound of birdsong in one and waking in the other. In the first reality, Amy and Rory are traveling with the Doctor in the TARDIS, and in the second, five years later, they are happily married in Leadworth and expecting their first child. In the TARDIS, an apparition named the "Dream Lord" appears, and tells them that one world is reality and the other an illusion. He says that they will face a deadly danger in both, and must decide which one is the dream.

In Leadworth, they are chased by the murderous Eknodine, an alien race that have disguised themselves as the elderly of the village. In the other reality, they are trapped in a powerless TARDIS, drifting towards a star that is "burning cold", a collision with which would freeze them to death. The Dream Lord tells them that they must determine which world is the dream and kill themselves in it in order to return to the true reality. However, if they choose wrong, they will be killed in both.

The Dream Lord keeps Amy awake in the TARDIS reality while the Doctor and Rory fall asleep and return to Leadworth. The Dream Lord questions Amy as to which world she would choose: a peaceful married life with Rory or adventure and excitement with the Doctor. Amy returns to Leadworth and joins Rory in defending her house from the Eknodine while the Doctor rescues villagers from the Eknodine in a motor-caravan. He reunites with his companions, but an Eknodine kills Rory. Amy decides that she is willing to risk her own life for the chance of seeing Rory again, and decides—without knowing for certain—that the Leadworth reality is false. Amy and the Doctor crash the motor-caravan into the house. The three wake up on the TARDIS, which the Dream Lord reactivates. He admits defeat and departs, after which, to Amy and Rory's surprise, the Doctor directs the TARDIS to self-destruct.

The trio again awaken in the TARDIS. The Doctor realized that both realities were false since the Dream Lord had no power over the real world and was in fact a manifestation of his darker side. The shared dreams were influenced by psychic pollen that had fallen in the TARDIS time rotor and heated up. Amy tells Rory that she does not want to live without him, and the three prepare to embark on another adventure.

=== Continuity ===
The Dream Lord describes the Doctor sarcastically as "The Oncoming Storm", a name coined by his archenemies the Daleks, and first mentioned in the Seventh Doctor novel Love and War and subsequently on-screen in "The Parting of the Ways", where it was attributed to the Daleks. He also says to the Doctor, "You're probably a vegetarian!" in a butcher's shop and calls him "veggie", referring to The Two Doctors (1985), in which the Sixth Doctor announced that he and Peri would eat a vegetarian diet from then on. The Dream Lord also teases the Doctor's relationship with Elizabeth I. This began in "The Shakespeare Code" where Elizabeth I wished to behead the Doctor and continued in "The End of Time", which alluded to the possibility the two were married. The marriage between the two was seen three years later in "The Day of the Doctor".

== Production ==
=== Writing ===
"It was more influenced by my own dreams, which aren't too frequent and sadly aren't normally very helpful in my creative work! In my mundane sitcom life, the last thing you want is completely surreal moments. But we've all had those moments, especially on waking, when you think 'Was that real, was that a dream?'. Doctor Who plays with levels of reality and alternative universes, and the dream world is an alternative universe of sorts and all the more interesting for being a distortion or embellishment of our own waking lives. And The Doctor, being so mercurial and full of thoughts and intelligence, his dream life is particularly interesting and rich. He's particularly freaked out by the idea that he should sleep at all – he sort of denies that that's the sort of thing he does – he's got too much to do and he's too wired. He's unnerved by the idea of dreaming himself."

— Simon Nye

"Amy's Choice" was written by Simon Nye, who is known for writing the sitcom Men Behaving Badly. Nye attended read-throughs of previous episodes to capture the character and "voice" of the Doctor and Amy. Nye admitted to restraining himself in the change from comedy to science fiction, but said it was "fun" and "hugely liberating". Showrunner Steven Moffat originally gave Nye the premise of the episode for it to fit in the series arc, which was to challenge the Doctor and Amy's relationship. Nye states that Rory's "death" scene is essentially where Amy realises her feelings for Rory. Nye wanted to prove that Amy really loved Rory, and he was "not just a cypher boyfriend or fiancé".

Moffat suggested the idea of the dream split to Nye, who was also influenced by his own dreams and sometimes wondering if they were real. Nye believed that the dream world was consistent with other alternate universes within Doctor Who. Moffat also instructed Nye to come up with a monster, and Nye chose the elderly people possessed by the Eknodine, reflecting his own fear of old people as a child, but he made clear that he did not intend to make children scared of their grandparents.

=== Filming and effects ===
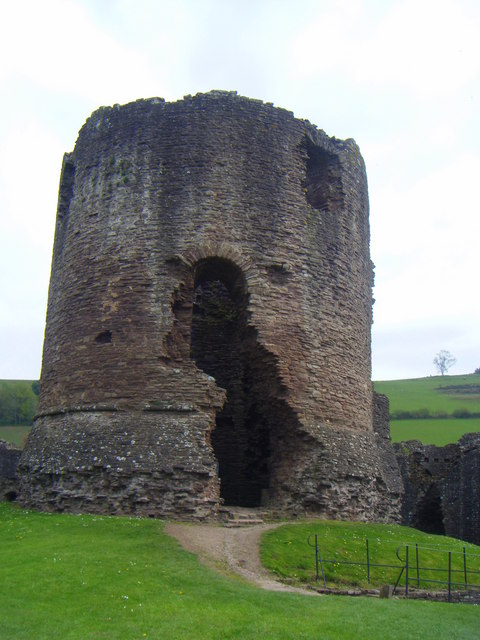
Skenfrith Castle, where some scenes were filmed

"Amy's Choice" was the last episode of the fifth series to be filmed, and the editing finished the week it aired. The read-through for the episode took place on 17 February 2010 in the Upper Boat Studios along with the read-through for episode eleven, marking the final two read-throughs for the series. The dream sequences taking place in the fictional town of Upper Leadworth were filmed in Skenfrith, Wales.

Karen Gillan had to wear a latex prosthetic stomach bump for the scenes that depicted Amy as pregnant. She claimed it made her feel more mature and act ridiculously, and cited it as her favourite part of filming the series. Arthur Darvill wore a wig for the aged Rory, which was trimmed to look "more masculine" and pulled back in a ponytail. The Eknodine were CGI and the scenes were simply filmed with the actors opening their mouths. The scene in which Rory hits Eknodine-inhabited Mrs Hamill with a plank was filmed first with Darvill missing actress Joan Linder, and then again with Linder's stunt double, whom he was allowed to hit. There was only one prop of the plank, and fortunately all the necessary shots were completed before Darvill accidentally broke it.

=== Cast notes ===
Nick Hobbs, who appeared as Mr Nainby in this episode, previously played Aggedor alongside Jon Pertwee's Third Doctor in the stories The Curse of Peladon and The Monster of Peladon. Hobbs has also previously appeared as a lorry driver in The Claws of Axos and operated the Wirrn prop for The Ark in Space. Audery Ardington, who played Mrs Poggit in the episode, also played the Abbess in The Sarah Jane Adventures episode Eye of the Gorgon.

== Broadcast and reception ==
"Amy's Choice" was first broadcast on BBC One in the United Kingdom on Saturday, 15 May 2010 from 6:25 p.m. to 7:10 p.m. In the United States it was shown on sister station BBC America on 5 June 2010. In the UK, preliminary overnight ratings for the episode totalled 6.2 million viewers; 5.9 million on BBC One and 0.3 million on BBC HD. Based on these estimated figures, viewership was about the same as the previous week. When final ratings were calculated, it was shown BBC One held 7.063 million viewers, the sixth most viewed programme for the week, and 485,000 viewers on BBC HD, the highest viewed programme of the week for that channel. This gave "Amy's Choice" final consolidated ratings of 7.55 million viewers. The episode was also given an Appreciation Index of 84.

"Amy's Choice" was released in Region 2 on DVD and Blu-ray format with the following episodes "The Hungry Earth" and "Cold Blood" on 2 August 2010. It was then re-released as part of the complete series five DVD on 8 November 2010.

=== Critical reception ===
Gavin Fuller, writing for The Daily Telegraph, was positive about the episode, calling it "probably the strongest all-round script we've had this year, chock full of good lines". He added, "The concept of aliens inhabiting elderly people and turning them psychotic was wittily realised, particularly the bizarre sight of them laying siege to Amy and Rory's cottage with household and gardening implements". He concluded that it "was one of those stories that you would only find in Doctor Who, and shows once again that the series can provide genuine thought-provoking, interesting drama alongside its thrills and spills".

Matt Wales of IGN rated the episode 8.5 out of 10 and described it as "surreal, fantastical, intriguing, witty, emotional and, at times, genuinely unsettling". Unlike Martin, he said it was "impressive enough on pacing alone" and made a "brisk, refreshing 45-minute episode". However, he criticised the ending for being "glossed over so quickly" and found Upper Leadworth hard to believe. Keith Phipps, writing on The A.V. Club, graded the episode a B and stated it was "a solid ... entry in what's been a generally terrific season of Doctor Who". He praised Toby Jones' performance as the Dream Lord, saying that "in lesser hands, he might have come off as a copycat version of Star Trek's Q, but Jones makes the part his own". However, he thought its weakness was the pace and "the retirement home-dwelling bad guys, who ultimately seem like a geriatric, and not that frightening, variation on the same old shambling zombies."

Daniel Martin, reviewing the episode for The Guardian, described it as "at least partially successful". He praised Karen Gillan's performance, saying that she "is capable of more than one-liners and physical comedy – and brings something to your eye, too". However, he thought that the episode lacked ideas and storylines usually found in the show, and criticised the sitcom-style dialogue. Patrick Mulkern, writing for the Radio Times, was "distinctly underwhelmed", comparing it to "one of the more disappointing episodes of The Sarah Jane Adventures". He "particularly disliked the demonising of elderly people". Upon rewatching, however, although "previous gripes" remained, he did appreciate some the "more subdued" background music from Murray Gold, the script's "tight structure and several amusing lines", and "the realisation that, for the first time, the Doctor is travelling with a couple in love".

SFX Magazine's Jordan Farley gave the episode 3 and a half out of 5 stars, saying the direction "never quite [struck] the right balance between absurdist humour and sinister nightmare" and the camera was "a little flat" with a strange angle. He was displeased with the discovery that it had all been a hallucination and stated that Rory's death and other instances of horror "never shock in the way you might expect". However, he praised Smith for being "on blindingly good form" while portraying the Doctor's quirkier traits, considered that Gillan and Darvill were "fast becoming the most likeable companion couple in Doctor Who history", and said Jones was "a lot of fun to watch" despite not seeming to be completely the Doctor's dark side.
