= Cold Blood (Doctor Who) =

Episode of Doctor Who

209b – "Cold Blood"
- Doctor Who episode
- A dead Rory is erased from history by the crack in the universe, the motif of the main story arc of the series. The emotional scene was praised by critics.

Cast
- Doctor: Matt Smith – Eleventh Doctor
- Companions: Karen Gillan – Amy Pond; Arthur Darvill – Rory Williams
- Others: Neve McIntosh – Alaya/Restac; Meera Syal – Nasreen Chaudhry; Robert Pugh – Tony Mack; Nia Roberts – Ambrose; Richard Hope – Malohkeh; Stephen Moore – Eldane; Alun Raglan – Mo; Samuel Davies – Elliot

Production
- Directed by: Ashley Way
- Written by: Chris Chibnall
- Produced by: Peter Bennett
- Executive producers: Steven Moffat; Piers Wenger; Beth Willis
- Music by: Murray Gold
- Production code: 1.9
- Series: Series 5
- Running time: 2nd of 2-part story, 45 minutes
- First broadcast: 29 May 2010

Chronology
← Preceded by "The Hungry Earth"	Followed by → "Vincent and the Doctor"

"Cold Blood" is the ninth episode in the fifth series of British science fiction television series Doctor Who, which was first broadcast on 29 May 2010 on BBC One. It was written by Chris Chibnall and directed by Ashley Way. It is the second episode of a two-part story, the first episode being "The Hungry Earth", which features the return of the reptilian humanoid Silurians.

In the episode, deep underground, humans Amy Pond (Karen Gillan) and Nasreen Chaudhry (Meera Syal) have a conference with the Silurians' leader Eldane (Stephen Moore) over sharing the Earth between the two species. Meanwhile, the Silurian warrior Alaya (Neve McIntosh) is kept hostage in Wales by locals Ambrose (Nia Roberts) and Tony (Robert Pugh) until their relatives Mo (Alun Raglan) and Elliot (Samuel Davies) are returned from underground. The negotiations collapse after Alaya is killed by Ambrose for not helping them.

Chibnall was selected by executive producers Steven Moffat and Piers Wenger to write a two-part episode about the return of the Silurians. Chibnall wanted "Cold Blood" in particular to be about the mistakes people make under pressure, and conflict that could come out of protecting a family. The episode is also connected to the series' story arc, as the crack in the universe returns at the end of the episode. "The Hungry Earth" and "Cold Blood" were filmed in October and November 2009, with scenes in "Cold Blood" shot in Llanwynno, Wales, Cardiff's Temple of Peace, Plantasia, and an array of locations and sets for parts of the Silurian city, which the production team did not want to look like a cave. The episode was watched by 7.49 million viewers in the United Kingdom and received mixed reviews from critics. Some reviewers were disappointed by the plot and characteristics of the Silurians, but the emotional ending was widely praised.

== Plot ==
Deep under the Earth, Amy and Mo escape from Silurian doctor Malohkeh's experimentation and Mo discovers his son Elliot is sedated in a chamber and under observation. Restac, the leader of the Silurian warrior caste, insists both the Eleventh Doctor and geologist Nasreen Chaudhry be executed and escorts them to a Silurian court. Eldane, Restac's superior, is called in by Malohkeh and demands a halt to the hostilities. The Doctor arranges a conference between Eldane, Amy, and Nasreen; the three discuss how humans and Silurians can co-exist on the surface. Malohkeh frees Elliot from his sedated state unharmed.

In Wales, Ambrose and Tony, who are Mo and Elliot's relatives, set Nasreen and Tony's drill to burrow into the oxygen pockets of the Silurians' underground city on a timer; they are worried about the Silurians' reaction when they discover Ambrose killed the captured Silurian Alaya for not cooperating.

Meanwhile, Restac has killed Malohkeh for his betrayal and awakened other members of the warrior caste, intending to stage a coup against Eldane. The Doctor escapes with the humans and channels an energy pulse to the base of the drill before it impacts the city, and switches off the energy barricade surrounding the village above. Eldane returns the warriors to hibernation by initiating a toxic fumigation; the humans escape, and Eldane hopes that in a thousand years, peace between humans and Silurians can occur. Tony, still affected by Alaya's venom, opts to stay behind to be cured in a thousand years, and Nasreen stays with Tony.

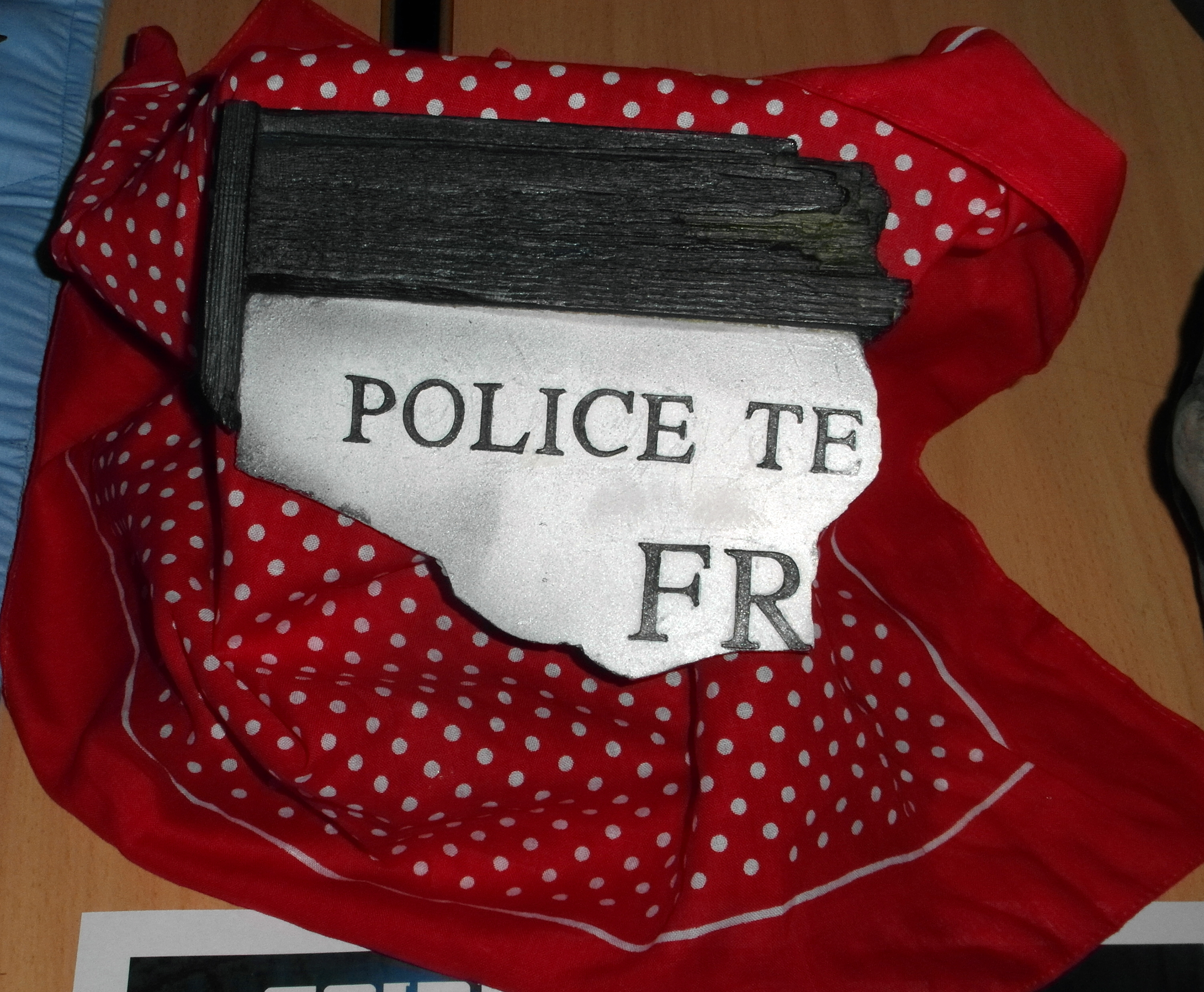
The TARDIS fragment prop used at the end of this episode, on display at an exhibition.

The Doctor, Amy, and Rory find a crack in the cavern wall similar to those they have seen in Amy's bedroom (Note: As depicted in the 2010 episode "The Eleventh Hour".) and on the Byzantium. (Note: As depicted in the 2010 episode "Flesh and Stone".) The Doctor pulls a piece of shrapnel from the explosion in time that caused the cracks, which is a piece of the TARDIS. Restac, dying from the toxic exposure, crawls around the corner and fires at the Doctor, but Rory pushes him out of the way and is killed. The crack absorbs Rory's body, erasing him from existence and causing Amy to lose her memory of him.

== Production ==
Writer Chris Chibnall was contracted by executive producers Steven Moffat and Piers Wenger to write a two-part Doctor Who episode about Silurians and a drill. Chibnall had previously written the Doctor Who episode "42" as well as episodes of the spin-off series Torchwood. "Cold Blood" is the second part of the story which began with "The Hungry Earth"; the latter built up the tension while "Cold Blood" was designed to get into the action. "Cold Blood" is also set in the bigger setting of the Silurian city, while "The Hungry Earth" was set in a small Welsh village. Chibnall wanted the Silurian city to contrast with the village. Chibnall wanted it to be a "story about people making mistakes under massive pressure" and the accidental conflict that came out of protecting a family; as such, he always intended for Alaya to die. He considered "Cold Blood" especially to be "so clearly about the Silurians and what the Silurians want".

Moffat's plan "from the outset", to tie the episode into the overarching story arc of the series, was that Rory not just die but be erased from history in the crack in the universe. Moffat would later bring Rory back in "The Pandorica Opens", though the episode reveals his consciousness was placed in a Roman centurion Auton as part of a trap for the Doctor to save the universe from the cracks. Moffat also thought it was appropriate as, the trio having had fun, now it was time for a casualty. Rory's death is also connected with Chibnall's theme of making mistakes; it was the Doctor's fault as he stopped to look at the crack. Gillan called the scene "incredibly challenging" for her to perform and tried to make it "truthful and believable". A close-up of Rory's face during his death was reshot because Darvill had originally performed the scene with his eyes open, which did not pass compliance.

"The Hungry Earth" and "Cold Blood" made up the fourth production block of the series and were filmed in late October and November 2009 in the Upper Boat Studios and Llanwynno, Wales. "Cold Blood" utilised many different locations and unusual sets to portray the Silurian city, as the production team did not want simply a "cave feel". They believed that the Silurians were also sophisticated and were able to use materials found underground, such as granite and marble. Many of the sets were given an orange glow from beneath to portray the "ambient glow" from the centre of the earth. The jungle walkway leading to the Silurian city was filmed in the Plantasia botanical garden in Swansea on 13 November 2009. The set gave a sense of things growing, as these were necessary for the Silurians to survive. Set designers were able to rearrange the plants, though they had to be careful not to show the window leading to the car park or other modern amenities. The hall where the Doctor is brought for execution was filmed at the Temple of Peace in Cardiff, and little dressing was done to the set.

== Broadcast and reception ==
"Cold Blood" was first broadcast in the United Kingdom on BBC One and simulcast on BBC HD on 29 May 2010. Initial overnight ratings showed that the episode was watched by 5.7 million viewers, a million more than the previous week. Final consolidated ratings rose to 7.49 million (7.04 million on BBC One and 0.45 million on BBC HD), ranking the show fourth for the week ending 30 May 2010 on the channel and the highest rated show on BBC One for the day. The episode received an Appreciation Index of 85, considered "excellent".

"Cold Blood" was released in Region 2 on DVD and Blu-ray on 2 August 2010 with the episodes "Amy's Choice" and "The Hungry Earth". It was then re-released as part of the Complete Fifth Series boxset on 8 November 2010.

=== Critical reception ===
The episode received mixed reviews from critics. Dan Martin, writing for The Guardian, said that the episode was similar to previous Silurian stories in Doctor Who, though he said he loved the "tense, mad and thoughtful story". He expressed "delight" at Amy and Nasreen negotiating for the humans, though he thought the diplomacy scenes were "broadly drawn". Overall, he considered the strength of the episode was "giving you something big and moral to chew over, in a way that nothing else this series has yet". Gavin Fuller of The Daily Telegraph also compared "Cold Blood"'s concept and ideas to the original 1970 Silurians story but considered this story made "less of an impact" due to a "black and white depiction" and the one-dimensional Restac. He was also critical of Matt Smith's Doctor, whose portrayal "lacked gravitas and conviction and was altogether too light-hearted". However, he praised both Smith and Gillan's "strong" performances in the final scene where Rory is killed.

The A.V. Club's Keith Phipps gave the episode a B+, noting that Rory's death had been spoiled for him by commenters on the site and thus he did not enjoy the episode as much as he might have. He called it a "satisfying, if not extraordinary" conclusion and "another pretty solid entry in the series". He further praised Gillan and Amy's character for "[continuing] to impress" as well as the depths given to the supporting characters by both Chibnall and Way, and the allegories that could be derived from the conflict between the humans and the Silurians and the aftermath of Rory's demise.

IGN's Matt Wales rated the episode 8 out of 10, and thought that "even less actually happened" than the previous episode, though he enjoyed the "atmospheric build-up and more thoughtful tone". While he considered it predictable, he said that it "still offered plenty in the way of entertainment with its brisk pace, beautifully-realised underground world and a convincing cast of rounded characters". He praised Smith and Gillan's performances in the ending, but thought it was "a surprisingly downbeat denouement". Ian Berriman of SFX magazine gave "Cold Blood" four and a half out of five stars, positively comparing the emotional ending to episodes from the Russell T Davies era. He also had some "nitpicks" about the episode, such as the abrupt character change of Malohkeh.
