= Eleventh Doctor =

Doctor Who character

The Doctor
The Eleventh Doctor
- Doctor Who character
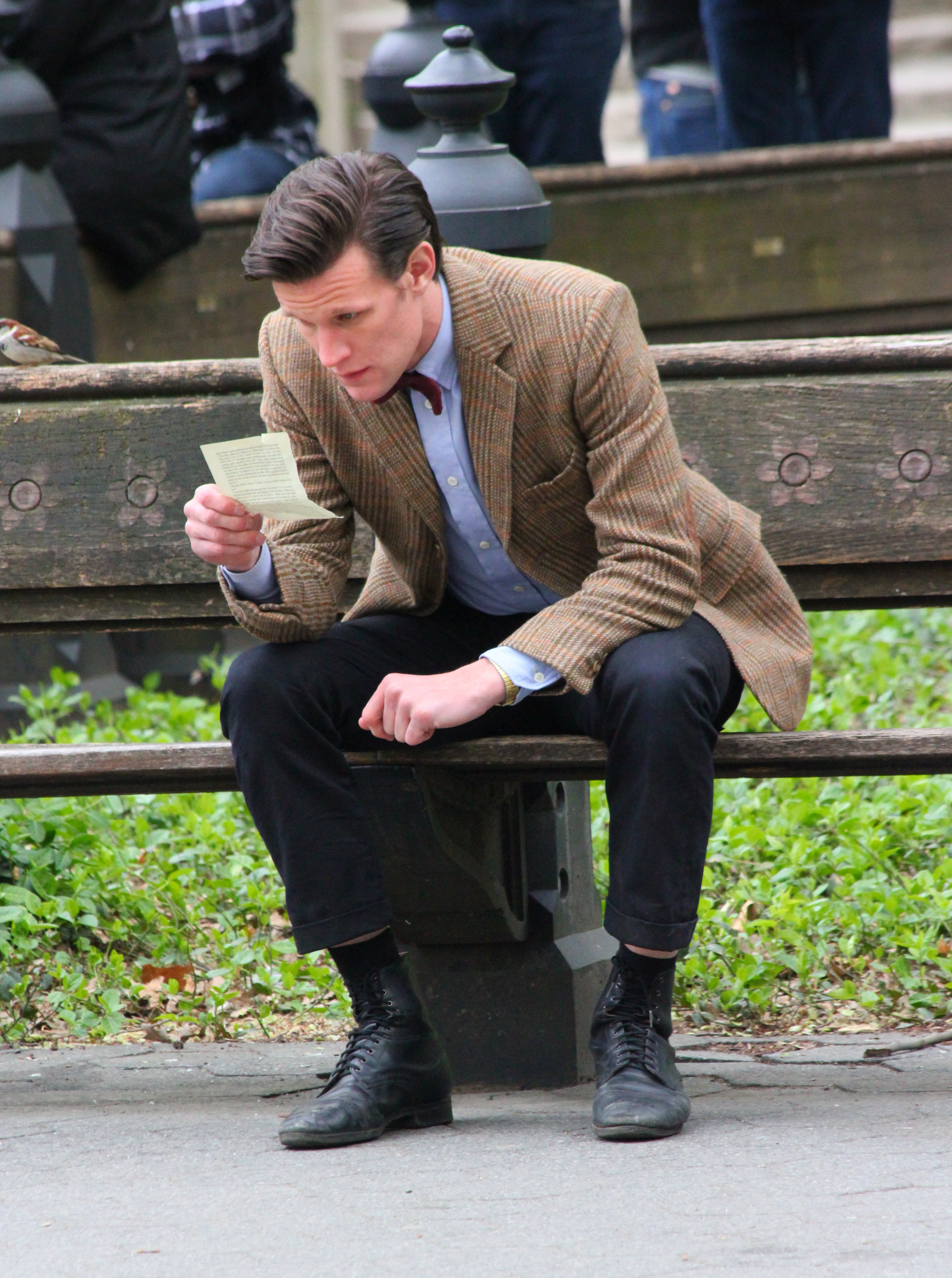
- Matt Smith as the Eleventh Doctor
- First regular appearance: "The Eleventh Hour" (2010)
- Last regular appearance: "The Time of the Doctor" (2013)
- Introduced by: Steven Moffat
- Portrayed by: Matt Smith
- Preceded by: David Tennant (Tenth Doctor)
- Succeeded by: Peter Capaldi (Twelfth Doctor)

Information
- Tenure: 3 April 2010 – 25 December 2013
- No of series: 3
- Appearances: 39 stories (44 episodes)
- Companions: Amy Pond; Rory Williams; River Song; Craig Owens; Clara Oswald
- Chronology: Series 5 (2010); Series 6 (2011); Series 7 (2012–2013); Specials (2013); Series 8 (2014) (cameo)

The Eleventh Doctor is an incarnation of the Doctor, the protagonist of the British science fiction television series Doctor Who. He is portrayed by Matt Smith in three series as well as five specials. As with previous incarnations of the Doctor, the character has also appeared in other Doctor Who spin-offs both during and after the character's televised appearances.

Within the series' narrative, the Doctor is a centuries-old alien "Time Lord" from the planet Gallifrey who travels in time and space in the TARDIS, frequently with companions. At the end of life, the Doctor regenerates; as a result, the physical appearance and personality of the Doctor changes. Smith's incarnation is a quick-tempered but compassionate character whose youthful appearance is at odds with his more discerning and world-weary temperament. Preceded in regeneration by the Tenth Doctor (David Tennant), he is followed by the Twelfth Doctor (Peter Capaldi). More so than past Doctors, his episodes used time travel to tell non-sequential stories involving time travel paradoxes over a four-year character arc.

This incarnation's main companions included Amy Pond (Karen Gillan), her husband Rory Williams (Arthur Darvill), and the mysterious Clara Oswald (Jenna Coleman). He also frequently appeared alongside River Song (Alex Kingston), a fellow time traveller with whom he shared a romantic storyline, and he was the last Doctor to appear alongside the long-serving companion Sarah Jane Smith (Elisabeth Sladen) prior to the actress' death, featuring in two episodes of the spin-off programme The Sarah Jane Adventures.

== Casting ==
The Doctor is a very special part, and it takes a very special actor to play him. You need to be old and young at the same time, a boffin and an action hero, a cheeky schoolboy and the wise old man of the universe. As soon as Matt walked through the door, and blew us away with a bold and brand new take on the Time Lord, we knew we had our man.

— Executive producer and head writer Steven Moffat on Smith's casting.

David Tennant announced at the National Television Awards on 29 October 2008 that he would be quitting the show, in 2010, because he felt that the four years he spent portraying the Doctor was enough. At the time, BBC News published that Paterson Joseph, who appeared in the Doctor Who episodes "Bad Wolf" and "The Parting of the Ways", was the bookmakers' favourite to succeed Tennant, followed by David Morrissey, who would be appearing in the 2008 Christmas special "The Next Doctor". Other candidates included Sean Pertwee, son of Third Doctor actor Jon Pertwee; Russell Tovey, who portrayed Alonso Frame in the 2007 Christmas special "Voyage of the Damned"; and James McAvoy.

Although Steven Moffat anticipated choosing a middle-aged actor for the new Doctor, Smith was aged 26 when cast, making him the youngest actor to portray the Doctor, three years younger than Peter Davison was at the time he began his role as the Fifth Doctor. Show producers were cautious about casting Smith because they felt that a 26-year-old could not play the Doctor adequately; BBC Wales Head of Drama Piers Wenger shared the sentiment, but noted that Smith was capable enough to play the role. Smith's casting in the role was revealed during an episode of Doctor Who's companion show Doctor Who Confidential, during which he described the role as "a wonderful privilege and challenge that I hope I will thrive on".

Prior to auditioning for the role, Smith had never seen Doctor Who. He prepared for the role by writing his own stories featuring the Doctor, and took special inspiration from Patrick Troughton's portrayal of the Second Doctor.

== Character ==
=== Costume ===
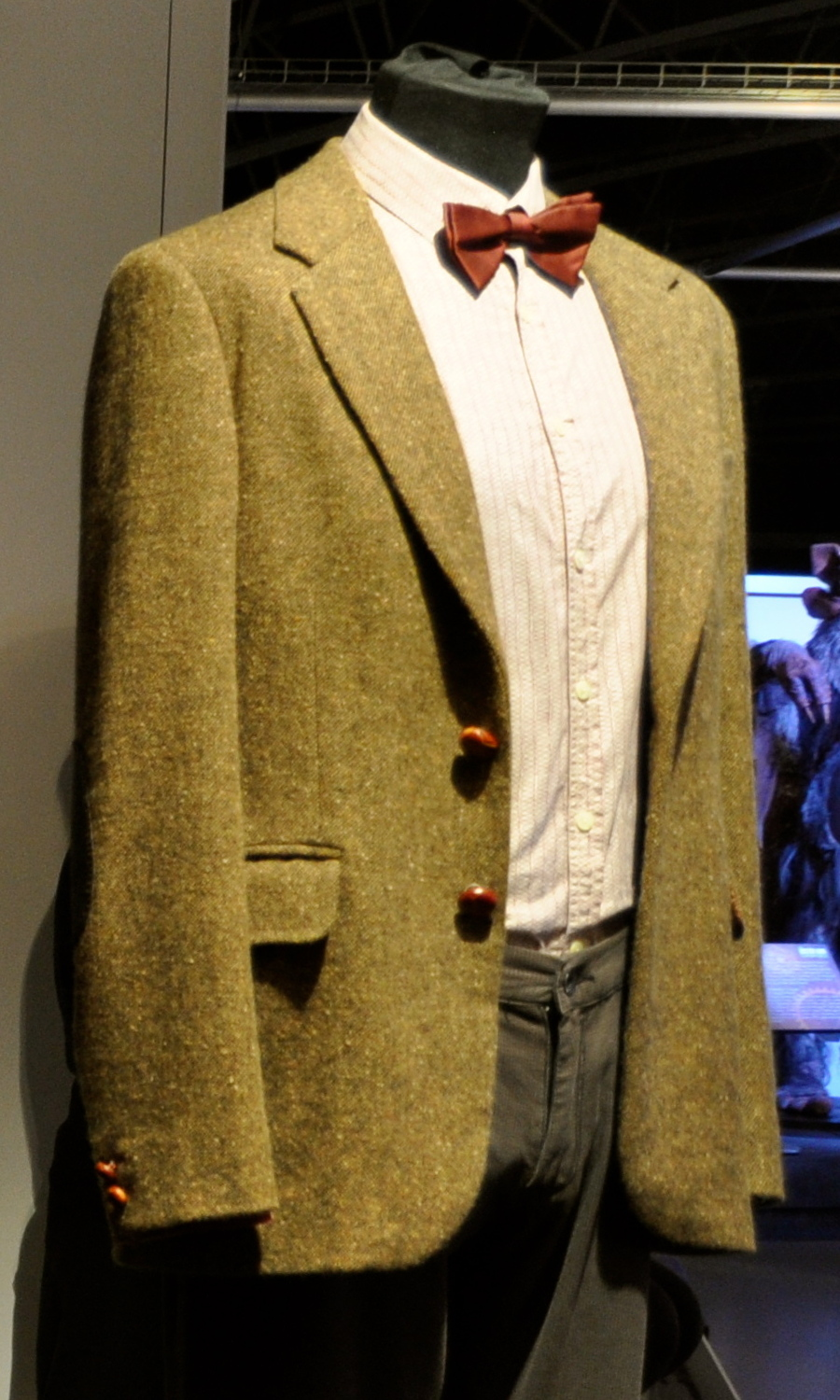
The Eleventh Doctor's first costume, first appearing in "The Eleventh Hour" (2010).

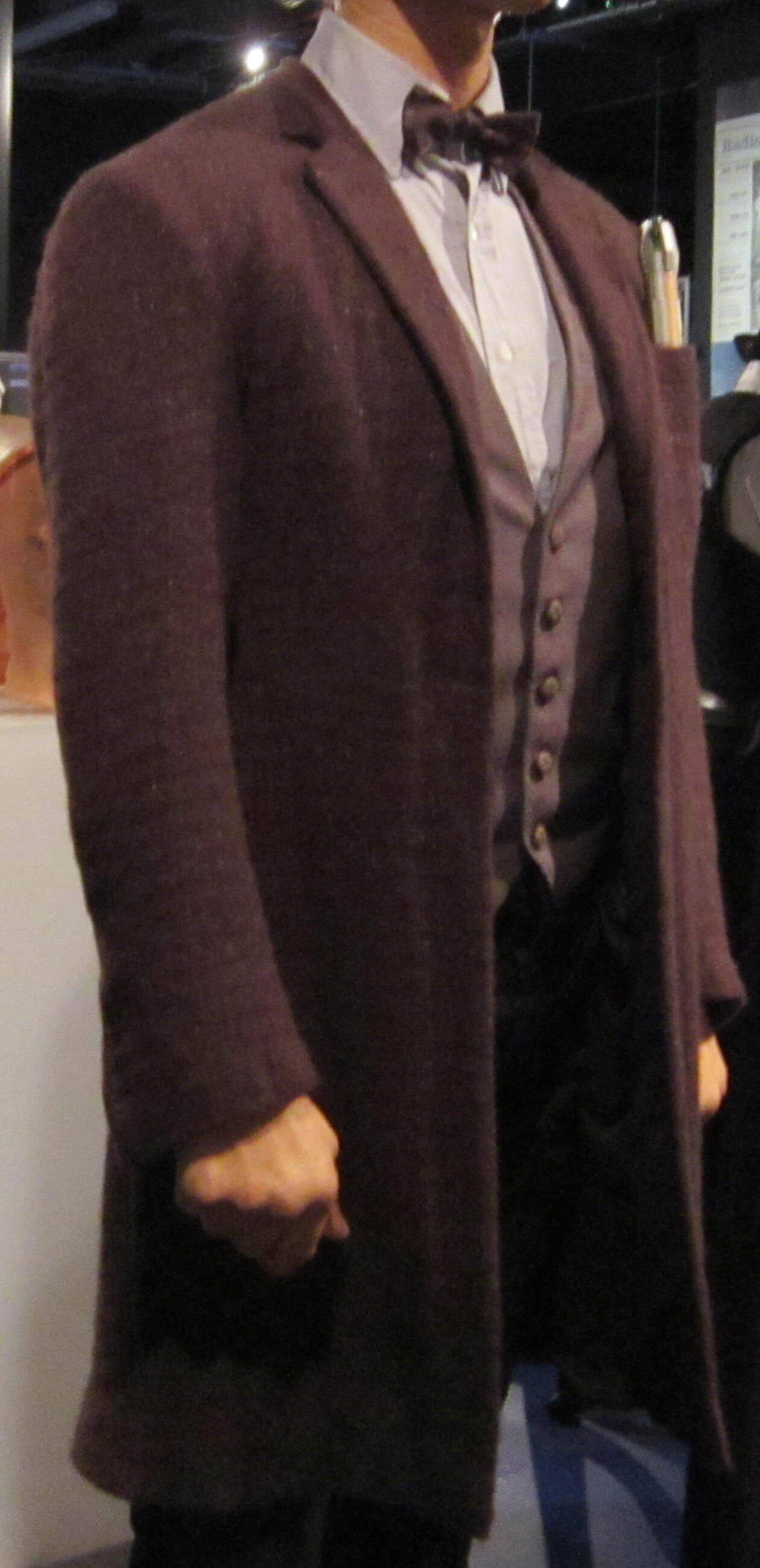
The Eleventh Doctor's second costume, first appearing in "The Bells of Saint John" (2013).

The Eleventh Doctor spends most of his first full episode, "The Eleventh Hour", in the tattered remains of the Tenth Doctor's clothing, leading young Amelia Pond to nickname him "the Raggedy Doctor".

The Doctor's initial outfit, chosen within the narrative of "The Eleventh Hour" from an array of clothes found in a hospital, is a brown tweed blazer with elbow patches of leather, bow tie, braces, skinny jeans, and black ankle boots. The details of the outfit vary, switching from a braces and bow tie combination in red to the same in blue. The Doctor's bow tie was established as his signature clothing item, and has been likened to the scarf worn by the Fourth Doctor (Tom Baker). Dialogue in the series also references the bow tie, most prominently through the Doctor's recurring declaration that "bow ties are cool". Occasional items of headwear were also declared by the Doctor as "cool", namely fezzes and Stetson hats.

From the Christmas special "A Christmas Carol" (2010), which aired the Christmas after the Eleventh Doctor's first series, his principal costume is amended to a "Prince of Wales check" tweed blazer and a 1950s white dress suit. In the second half of series 6 (2011), an army green greatcoat alternates with the Prince of Wales blazer.

After appearing in Victorian period clothing throughout "The Snowmen" (2012), the Doctor's costume changes to generally more sombre colours beginning in "The Bells of Saint John" (2013), consisting of an eggplant purple cashmere frock coat and a variety of waistcoats, while retaining the signature bow tie. Amy Pond's reading glasses, which were left behind with the Doctor after Amy and Rory's departure in the episode "The Angels Take Manhattan" (2012), are also occasionally worn.

In an interview with Doctor Who Magazine, Steven Moffat revealed that the Eleventh Doctor had an entirely different costume until close to the start of filming. The original look had a swashbuckling feel which Doctor Who Magazine editor Tom Spilsbury described as "a little like something Captain Jack Sparrow wears in the Pirates of the Caribbean movies". However, Matt Smith was unhappy with the costume as he felt it reflected how someone else would dress the Doctor, rather than how the Doctor would dress himself. Smith also mentioned in a 2012 interview that his Doctor was going to have a "very long black leather jacket, but it was too Matrix-style". The eventual costume, in particular the bow tie, was influenced by Patrick Troughton's Second Doctor, after Matt Smith fell in love with the Troughton story The Tomb of the Cybermen.

=== Personality ===
Doctor Who filming, with Matt Smith as the Eleventh Doctor, and Karen Gillan as Amy Pond

Steven Moffat describes the Eleventh Doctor as an "old man trapped in a young man's body" and Matt Smith characterises him as someone with "a lot of blood on his hands" who copes via constant travelling and thrill-seeking. This is reflected by his self-adopted nickname of being a "Mad Man with a Box".

The depictions of the personalities of the Tenth and Eleventh Doctors shared certain similarities, e.g. being youthful, energetic, friendly, childlike, "good boyfriend Doctors", as Steven Moffat described them, and, according to Mark Gatiss "very human Doctors" when compared to other incarnations. Like his predecessor, when he first regenerates in the final scene of "The End of Time" (2010), the Eleventh Doctor mistakes himself as a "ginger". He also seems surprised at his longer hair, at first mistaking his new body as female, stating, "Hair... I'm a girl!". In the same episode, his first use of the word "Geronimo!" is heard, which would be a recurring catchphrase for the character.

== Appearances ==
=== Television ===
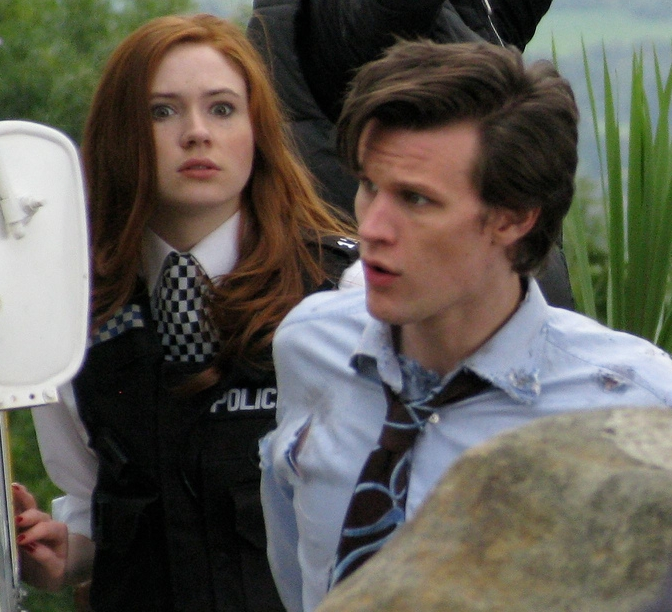
Karen Gillan as Amy Pond, with Matt Smith as the Eleventh Doctor, filming "The Eleventh Hour"; Smith is wearing a tattered version of his predecessor's costume, which led to the Eleventh Doctor earning the nickname "Raggedy Doctor" (2009)

The Eleventh Doctor first appears in the final scene of "The End of Time" (2010) when his previous incarnation regenerates. Smith debuts fully in "The Eleventh Hour", where he first meets Amy Pond (Karen Gillan) as a child while investigating a mysterious crack in her wall. Many years later, Amy joins the Doctor as his travelling companion on the eve of her marriage to Rory Williams (Arthur Darvill). In "Victory of the Daleks", he is tricked into spawning a new generation of Daleks. In the two-part story "The Time of Angels" and "Flesh and Stone", he re-encounters future companion River Song (Alex Kingston) and his enemies the Weeping Angels and learns that cracks like the one in Amy's wall are erasing individuals entirely from time and space. After Amy attempts to seduce the Doctor, the Doctor recruits Rory as a second companion from "The Vampires of Venice" up until "Cold Blood", where he is killed protecting the Doctor and is erased from history. The Doctor also confronts his dark side in "Amy's Choice", where he is put through trials by a manifestation of his self-loathing, the Dream Lord (Toby Jones). In the episode "The Lodger", the character of Craig Owens (James Corden) is introduced as an "ordinary" human and accidental temporary companion of Doctor Who, he later appears once more in the companion role in the following series, as seen in the episode "Closing Time". In the final episodes "The Pandorica Opens" and "The Big Bang", an unknown force makes the TARDIS explode, causing the universe to collapse in on itself. Though he closes the cracks —reversing their effects and preventing the explosion— the Doctor himself is erased from history. River assists Amy in remembering the Doctor back into existence; he returns at her wedding to Rory, and the couple rejoin him as his companions. He next appears later in Death of the Doctor, a two-part story of spin-off series The Sarah Jane Adventures, alongside former companions Sarah Jane Smith (Elisabeth Sladen) and Jo Grant (Katy Manning), while Amy and Rory are on honeymoon.

Series 6 in 2011 continues to examine mysteries left unexplained at the end of Series 5. In "The Impossible Astronaut" and "Day of the Moon", Amy, Rory and River witness a future version of the Doctor murdered, which they vow to keep a secret from the present-day Doctor as they encounter hypnotic aliens called "the Silence". Eventually, Amy unknowingly lets slip that the Doctor dies in "The Almost People", when it also turns out that she is pregnant and has been kidnapped by the nefarious Madame Kovarian (Frances Barber). In "A Good Man Goes to War", the Doctor calls in old favours from across time and space to raise an army to rescue Amy from Demons Run, an asteroid in the 52nd century being used as a base by a religious order, but is unable to rescue her child, Melody Pond. The Doctor also learns that Melody—though Rory and Amy's child—is part Time Lord due to being conceived in the TARDIS, and she will grow up to become River Song. In "Let's Kill Hitler", the Doctor encounters a younger iteration of River and learns she has been conditioned by the Silence, explained to be a religious order, to assassinate him. She nearly succeeds using a kiss of poisoned lipstick before Amy convinces her to save his life instead. The Doctor also learns the circumstances of his death from historical records on a time-travelling shape-shifting robot ship called the Teselecta. In "The God Complex", the Doctor leaves Amy and Rory on Earth when he realises Amy's apotheosis of him endangers their lives. Some time passes before the Doctor is ready to confront his death. In "The Wedding of River Song", he devises an escape by concealing himself within the Teselecta, which is disguised to look like him, to make it seem he is shot and burned as history records. In a doomed alternate reality caused by River's reluctance to shoot the Doctor, the two become married; during the ceremony, she is let in on the Doctor's original plan and helps fake and corroborate his death. The Doctor is then warned by his old friend Dorium Maldovar (Simon Fisher-Becker) that more prophecies still concern him. The Doctor learns he will be asked the oldest question in the universe, "Doctor who?", on the battlefields of Trenzalore; the Silence had intended his death to prevent this.

In the Christmas special "The Doctor, the Widow and the Wardrobe" (2011), the Doctor has Christmas dinner with Amy and Rory, who had been informed by River of his survival. They unite again in the Series 7 premiere "Asylum of the Daleks" (2012), in which the Doctor is erased from the Daleks' memory banks due to the actions of Oswin Oswald (Jenna Coleman), a young woman turned Dalek who had retained her human mind; she subsequently dies. The Doctor then takes Amy and Rory on several adventures, eventually taking them back on as full-time companions in "The Power of Three" before losing them during the events of "The Angels Take Manhattan". The Doctor subsequently "retires" to a secluded lifestyle in Victorian London, until the 2012 Christmas special "The Snowmen," when he is inspired to save the world by a barmaid/governess called Clara (Coleman) who he considers an ideal companion. Mid-adventure, Clara dies, and when the Doctor sees her tombstone, reading "Clara Oswin Oswald", he realizes that Oswin and Clara are the same woman in different moments of time. He resolves to find her again in another era. The Doctor succeeds in "The Bells of Saint John", saving a present-day version of Clara Oswald from agents of the Great Intelligence. He takes her as his companion and attempts to solve the mystery of "the Impossible Girl". The Doctor eventually gets his answer in "The Name of the Doctor" when he is forced by the Great Intelligence to go to Trenzalore, revealed to be the planet on which the Doctor will die. Within the Doctor's tomb, the Great Intelligence uses the dead Doctor's remnants—his disembodied "timestream"—to spread himself across the Doctor's history, turning his victories into defeats. Clara pursues him and is scattered throughout the Doctor's timeline creating Oswin Oswald and Clara Oswin Oswald among numerous other incarnations who undo the Great Intelligence's work. The Doctor has a mournful conversation with River's apparition, giving her closure before entering the timeline to retrieve Clara. However, once he saves her, the Doctor is forced to reveal the existence of a previous incarnation (John Hurt) who broke the promise represented by the name "Doctor" during the Time War of his past.

In the show's 50th anniversary special, while investigating a strange occurrence beneath London's National Gallery, the Doctor encounters his past incarnation who fought in the Time War (John Hurt) as well as his immediate previous incarnation (David Tennant). Though the older Doctors berate the 'War Doctor' for his killing both Time Lords and Daleks with a sentient weapon known as the Moment, they ultimately choose to support his decision and forgive themselves for this past atrocity. Led by the Moment into the midst of the Time War, the Doctors realize they have the potential to change its outcome and enlist the aid of their previous incarnations in an uncertain bid to save Gallifrey from destruction. They place the planet in stasis and transport it to a pocket universe, making it appear to be destroyed. As an effect of time travel, only the Eleventh Doctor will remember saving Gallifrey; he learns from a cryptic curator (played by Tom Baker) that his plan worked. In "The Time of the Doctor," the Doctor is lured to what he learns is the planet Trenzalore to decode what he discovers is a message from the displaced Time Lords through the last remaining crack in the universe: the oldest question in the universe, "Doctor who?". Learning that the verification of his identity would allow the Time Lords to return, the Doctor finds out that the signal caught the attention of an assortment of his enemies, who wish to prevent Gallifrey's return, and the powerful Church of the Papal Mainframe, who wish to destroy the planet and avoid the possibility of a new Time War. After attempting to send Clara back to her time, the Doctor spends centuries defending the planet from alien incursions. During this time, a faction of the Church led by the Silence breaks away and attempts to avert these events by destroying the Doctor earlier in his timeline, as seen in series 5 and 6. The Doctor also reveals to Clara he has no regenerations remaining and will likely die in the siege. The siege escalates into all-out war and after centuries pass, only the Daleks remain. Though the heavily aged Doctor anticipates his predestined death on the battlefields of Trenzalore, Clara convinces the Time Lords to give the Doctor a new regeneration cycle as he uses a fiery blast of regenerative energy to destroy the Dalek mothership. The Doctor regains his youth before retiring to the TARDIS to complete the process. He hallucinates a final farewell to Amy Pond and delivers a eulogy to his present incarnation, before abruptly completing his transition into the Twelfth Doctor (Peter Capaldi). He made a reappearance in "Deep Breath" (2014). While adjusting to the new Doctor, Clara receives a phone call from the Eleventh Doctor made moments prior to their final meeting. He asks her to help his new self and not to be afraid of him.

=== Literature ===
Like the Tenth Doctor, the Eleventh and Amy (and later Rory) appear in New Series Adventures novels in 2010. The first of these is Apollo 23 by Justin Richards, as well as the Decide Your Destiny series of interactive novels. The character also appears in comic books published in Doctor Who Magazine, Doctor Who Adventures, and he took over from the Tenth Doctor in IDW Publishing's Doctor Who series before BBC Worldwide awarded the license to Titan Magazines. He'll continue to appear in these, as will the Tenth and Twelfth Doctors in their own stories. He appeared in the crossover series Star Trek: The Next Generation/Doctor Who: Assimilation2, where he was working with the crew of the Enterprise-D to defeat a Borg/Cybermen alliance.

=== Audio ===
The Eleventh Doctor also appears in a series of audiobooks. The Runaway Train by Oli Smith is the first release of these.

To tie into the 50th anniversary of Doctor Who in 2013, Big Finish and AudioGO produced The Time Machine, an audiobook story starring the Eleventh Doctor and narrated by Jenna Coleman. The Eleventh Doctor made his next audio appearance in 2016 for The Churchill Years - starring Ian McNeice narrating in-character as Winston Churchill - and its second series in 2018. He also appeared alongside the Tenth Doctor in The Jago and Litefoot Revival in 2017, narrated by Trevor Baxter and Christopher Benjamin.

In the absence of Matt Smith, voice actor and impressionist Jacob Dudman has voiced the Eleventh Doctor in multiple Big Finish productions, including the ongoing range The Eleventh Doctor Chronicles, which debuted in August 2018. In the first volume, Dudman voices the Doctor and serves as narrator; the second volume, released in September 2021, featured Dudman as the Doctor in full-cast dramas with no narrator. Dudman also voices the Eleventh Doctor for a cameo appearance opposite the Fifth Doctor in Thin Time and a pair of Short Trips in which the Doctor reunites with Jo Grant and meets his next incarnation, also voiced by Dudman.

In 2022, The Eleventh Doctor Chronicles underwent a format change for its third volume - Geronimo! - launching a twelve-part story across four volumes, set between the events of The Snowmen and The Bells of Saint John. Dudman returned as the Doctor and Safiyya Ingar was cast as the Doctor's new companion, Valarie Lockwood. The conclusion of this series in February 2024 also marked Dudman's retirement from the role of the Eleventh Doctor and the hiatus of the Chronicles range.

Following Dudman's departure, Miles Taylor took over the role of the Doctor and the series was relaunched as The Eleventh Doctor Adventures in 2026, introducing new companion Eleanor Fong (Jasmine Bayes).

=== Video games ===
The Eleventh Doctor is the first of the Doctors to appear in full-on action adventure games. Doctor Who: The Adventure Games is composed of four stories ("episodes"), produced alongside the 2010 series. Smith and Gillan lent their voices and likenesses. The first, City of the Daleks, carries on from the TV episode "Victory of the Daleks" and is a stealth and puzzle game set in 1960s Earth and the Dalek planet of Skaro. The second, Blood of the Cybermen, is the Eleventh Doctor and Amy's first Cyberman story. The third episode is the video game TARDIS, and the fourth is The Shadows of the Vashta Nerada, featuring the titular enemy return in an underwater setting. The fifth Adventure Game The Gunpowder Plot was released on 31 October 2011, again featuring Matt Smith's voice. In November 2010, Doctor Who: Return to Earth and Doctor Who: Evacuation Earth, were released for the Nintendo Wii and Nintendo DS respectively, starring the voices of Matt Smith and Karen Gillan; in May 2012, The Eternity Clock was released for PlayStation 3, PlayStation Vita, and PC, starring Matt Smith and Alex Kingston.

== Critical reception ==
Matt Smith's portrayal of the Doctor was met with critical acclaim. Following the broadcast of "The Eleventh Hour", The Daily Telegraph reviewer Benji Wilson opined that "the Doctor is meant to be a mad alien, and Smith looks like one before he even opens his mouth", stating "it was ridiculous but it felt right: mad, alien, brand new but very old. A+ to the casting director. A+ to Smith". In The Guardian, Daniel Martin concurred, stating that "Smith inhabits the role from the moment he pops up...[he] carries off the youthful vigour of a new body and the ancient professorial wisdom with easy panache".

Martin Anderson of Shadowlocked claimed him to be the best Doctor since "Tom Baker practically redefined the character in the 1970s". Smith's performance in "Flesh and Stone" was acclaimed by Gavin Fuller of The Daily Telegraph, who noted that "Matt Smith's 'quick-paced delivery' is 'a major facet' of the success of the current series." In his review of "The Big Bang", Fuller once again praised Smith's acting. "Matt Smith was superb in his scenes where the Doctor sacrifices himself in the Pandorica to rescue the multiverse". Kyle Anderson of Nerdist wrote "I don't know about you all, but the Eleventh Doctor was MY Doctor." Dan Martin of The Guardian also claimed Smith as "my ultimate Doctor."
