= Amy Pond =

Fictional character from Doctor Who

- Doctor Who character
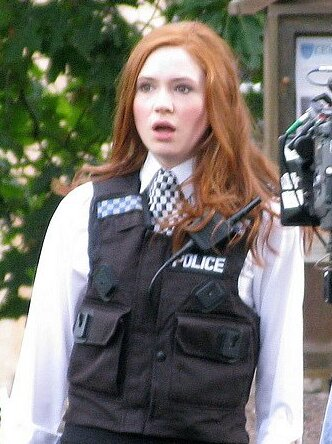
- Karen Gillan as Amy Pond
- First appearance: "The Eleventh Hour" (2010)
- Last appearance: "The Time of the Doctor" (2013)
- Created by: Steven Moffat
- Portrayed by: Karen Gillan; Caitlin Blackwood (young)
- Duration: 2010–2013

In-universe information
- Full name: Amelia Jessica Pond
- Nicknames: Amy, "The Girl Who Waited" (by the Doctor)
- Gender: Female
- Occupation: Journalist; Author; Model (formerly); Kissogram (formerly)
- Affiliation: Eleventh Doctor
- Family: Augustus Pond (father); Tabitha Pond (mother)
- Spouse: Rory Williams (husband)
- Children: Melody Pond (daughter); Anthony Williams (adoptive son)
- Relatives: Sharon (aunt); The Doctor (child-in-law)
- Origin: Inverness, Scotland
- Home era: Early 21st century

Amelia Jessica Williams (née Pond) is a fictional character portrayed by Karen Gillan in the long-running British science fiction television series Doctor Who. Amy is a companion of the series protagonist the Eleventh Doctor, played by Matt Smith. She appears in the programme from the fifth series (2010) to midway through the seventh series (2012). Gillan returned for a brief cameo in Smith's final episode "The Time of the Doctor".

The Doctor first meets Amy when she is about seven years old (portrayed by Caitlin Blackwood) and disturbed by a crack in her wall. He promises to return to the lonely girl in five minutes and take her with him in the TARDIS, but accidentally arrives twelve years later, by which time adult Amy has become sceptical about her "imaginary friend". However, she eventually decides to travel with him, and the duo are later joined by her fiancé Rory Williams (Arthur Darvill). Amy and Rory marry at the end of the fifth series. In the sixth series, Amy gives birth to their daughter, Melody Pond, who is revealed to be recurring character (since the fourth series) River Song (Alex Kingston). The Doctor and River marry in "The Wedding of River Song", making Amy the Doctor's mother-in-law. Amy and Rory departed the series in "The Angels Take Manhattan", the fifth episode of the seventh series, when they are transported back in time by a Weeping Angel.

== Appearances ==
=== Television ===
Amelia Pond is introduced in the first episode of the fifth series (2010), "The Eleventh Hour", as a seven-year-old Scottish girl living with only her aunt when the Doctor (Matt Smith) crashes into her front yard one night. She asks him to investigate an unusual crack in her wall, but he is interrupted by an alert from the TARDIS. He promises Amelia that he will return in five minutes, but is inadvertently late by twelve years. In the intervening period, Amelia's family and friends believe the Doctor is just her imaginary friend; her insistence that he is real leads to her being treated by psychiatrists. When the Doctor returns, Amy is nineteen years old and working as a kissogram. She helps him save Earth from the galactic police force, the Atraxi, and when he returns two years later she begins travelling with him as his companion. At the end of "Flesh and Stone", Amy reveals that they had left Earth on the eve of her marriage to Rory Williams (Arthur Darvill) and attempts to seduce the Doctor. The Doctor finds Rory and takes him and Amy to 16th century Venice on an intended romantic date after which Rory continues travelling with them. In "Amy's Choice", Amy is pressured to resolve her conflicted feelings for the Doctor and Rory and realises the depth of her love for Rory. At the end of "Cold Blood", Rory is killed by a Silurian, then is erased from history by the cracks in the universe. Because he is part of Amy's own time-line, she ceases to remember him. The Doctor takes Amy to 19th century France to lessen his guilt about Rory's loss and she forms a close friendship with famed painter Vincent van Gogh (Tony Curran).

In the fifth series finale, "The Pandorica Opens"/"The Big Bang", Rory reappears in 102 AD as a Roman centurion. He triggers Amy's memories, but as she remembers, it is revealed that the centurion Rory is actually an Auton—a duplicate of living plastic—created from Amy's memories to help capture the Doctor. Rory's consciousness tries to fight his programming, but he is compelled to shoot and kill her. Amy's body is kept alive in the Pandorica, a special prison intended to trap the Doctor. The Auton Rory protects it for 2000 years. The Doctor realises that Amy is connected to the cracks in the universe which originated from a temporal explosion on her wedding day. He tells her that her parents had been erased by the crack in her wall and urges her to remember them. After he uses the Pandorica to reboot the universe, the Doctor travels back through his timeline and is able to plant memories in Amy of the TARDIS. Amy awakes on her wedding day in a timeline where her parents are again part of reality and marries a restored Rory. Her memories are stirred by the TARDIS-shaped diary River Song (Alex Kingston) leaves for her. Once Amy remembers the Doctor, he is restored to reality. It is mentioned in The Sarah Jane Adventures serial Death of the Doctor that the Doctor dropped Amy and Rory off on a "honeymoon planet", and the couple continues their honeymoon aboard an interstellar cruise ship which the Doctor saves from crashing into a populated planet.

The sixth series (2011) begins with Amy and Rory living a normal domestic life. They receive an anonymous invitation to the Utah desert where they reunite with the Doctor —now aged nearly two hundred years since they have last met —and fellow invitee River Song. Amy witnesses the Doctor's death at the hand of an astronaut in an Apollo space suit, but they discover the Doctor also invited a younger version of himself, with whom they travel to 1969 Washington, D.C. to investigate strange occurrences involving the Silence, an alien race who cannot be remembered after they are encountered. While there, Amy informs the Doctor she is pregnant before attempting to shoot a little girl in an Apollo space suit, believing it will stop her from killing the future Doctor. In the girl's orphanage room, Amy finds strange pictures of herself holding a newborn baby. When the Doctor questions Amy about the pregnancy, she insists she was wrong and further investigation by the Doctor is inconclusive. Throughout their adventures, Amy is plagued by strange visions of a woman wearing an eye-patch (Frances Barber) appearing sporadically only to her. In "The Almost People" it is revealed that the Amy presented (on screen) insisting she is not pregnant, is actually a Ganger – a duplicate animated by the real Amy's consciousness – while the real Amy is in the captivity of the eye-patched woman and about to give birth. In "A Good Man Goes to War", her baby —named Melody Pond —is kidnapped by the eye-patched woman, Madame Kovarian, who will train her to one day kill the Doctor. River Song then arrives and tells Amy that she is an adult Melody.

A flashback in "Let's Kill Hitler" introduces Amy and Rory's childhood friend Mels (Nina Toussaint-White). As teenagers, it was Mels who pointed out that Rory had been in love with Amy for some time, which led to the two dating. In the present, Mels hijacks the TARDIS and directs it to 1939 where she is shot by Hitler (Albert Welling) and regenerates into River Song, revealing that Amy had grown up alongside her daughter, who was trained by the Silence to kill the Doctor. Amy is later persuaded by the Doctor to let her adult daughter make her own way in life. In "The Girl Who Waited", Amy becomes separated from the Doctor and Rory on a planet's quarantine facility and lives on her own for 36 years before they return. The Doctor wants to go back in time to rescue the younger Amy, but the older Amy insists that they take both of her. However, the Doctor knows the TARDIS will not accept the paradox and is forced to leave the older Amy behind. In "The God Complex", the Doctor breaks Amy's faith in him after he discovers that they are trapped in a prison for a being that kills by feeding on faith. At the conclusion of that episode, not wanting to risk their lives further, he parts ways with her and Rory after giving them a house and car. Amy appears briefly in "Closing Time", where she is shown to have become a fashion model, noted for a perfume campaign with the slogan "For The Girl Who Is Tired of Waiting". The sixth series finale "The Wedding of River Song" depicts an alternate universe created by River refusing to kill the Doctor in Utah, as previously shown. Amy leads a secret organisation which fights the Silence. She reunites the Doctor with River and later kills Madame Kovarian for kidnapping Melody and depriving her of raising her baby. After history is restored, River visits Amy and reveals that the Doctor has faked his death. At the end of the 2011 Christmas special, the Doctor returns to Amy and Rory two years later (in their time) and has Christmas dinner with them.

The series seven opener "Asylum of the Daleks" (2012) shows Amy, still working as a fashion model, signing papers for her and Rory's divorce. In the episode, the Doctor engineers a reconciliation between the two during the mission, allowing them to discuss their feelings for each other. It is revealed Amy left Rory because she has been infertile since "A Good Man Goes to War", and knew he wanted children. The couple continue traveling with the Doctor on small adventures in "Dinosaurs on a Spaceship" and "A Town Called Mercy", but leave at the end of each to return to their normal lives. In "The Power of Three", Amy says that the Doctor has been in her and Rory's life for ten years, and she now works as a journalist. The couple realise they have to choose between their normal lives and their life with the Doctor. They are inclined to choose the former, but Rory's father Brian (Mark Williams) encourages the pair to continue travelling with the Doctor. Their next adventure, "The Angels Take Manhattan", is their last. In the story, Amy and Rory are threatened by the Weeping Angels, whose touch will send them into the distant past to die alone. Having witnessed this eventuality, they attempt suicide, creating a paradox which destroys all but one Angel, but also renders the area permanently off-limits to the Doctor's TARDIS. In the present, the surviving Angel sends Rory back in time, and knowing the Doctor cannot recover him, Amy allows the Angel to touch her too so she can be with him. Gravestones in a New York cemetery reveal that Rory died at the age of 82 and Amy died at the age of 87. River arranges for Amy to leave the Doctor a message in the afterword of a 1930s pulp fiction novel, where she says she is happy with Rory and that they worry about the Doctor travelling alone. "P.S.", a mini-episode supplement based on the original script for this episode, shows that Rory and Amy adopted a son, in 1946, and named him Anthony Brian Williams. Gillan reprises the role in "The Time of the Doctor" (2013), in which Matt Smith departs the series. During the Eleventh Doctor's regeneration, he hallucinates images of young Amelia Pond on board his TARDIS, before a vision of adult Amy approaches and says a final goodbye.

In the 60th anniversary special story "The Giggle", the Toymaker depicts Amy as a marionette alongside Clara Oswald and Bill Potts, taunting the Fourteenth Doctor by reminding him of companions who died while travelling with him.

=== Other media ===
In addition to the television series, Amy has appeared in several BBC-licensed Doctor Who novels, audio dramas, and comics. The first set of corresponding New Series Adventures novels—Apollo 23, Night of the Humans and The Forgotten Army—were published in April 2010 and feature solely the Eleventh Doctor and Amy. The next set—comprising Nuclear Time, The King's Dragon and The Glamour Chase—were released in July 2010 and feature the Doctor, Amy, and Rory. In Michael Moorcock's lengthier The Coming of the Terraphiles, which takes place during a time in the fifth series Rory is absent, Amy is proposed to by one of the characters, to whom she declines. In April 2011, another set of New Series Adventures were released to correspond with Amy and Rory's travels in the sixth series, containing Dead of Winter, The Way Through the Woods, and Hunter's Moon. A subsequent series of three books were published in June. In September, another longer novel was published, The Silent Stars Go By, which sees the trio face the Ice Warriors. In addition, Amy appears singularly alongside the Doctor in four 2010 "Decide Your Destiny" books, as well as alongside Rory in six "2in1" adventure chapter books. The three also feature in the Quick Reads Initiative novella Magic of the Angels.

Amy, Rory, and the Doctor appear in IDW Publishing's comic book series Assimilation^{2}, published from May to December 2012, which is a crossover between Doctor Who and Star Trek: The Next Generation. They team up with the crew of the USS Enterprise-D to stop an alliance between the Borg and the Cybermen. Amy and Rory appear briefly in the mini-series "Prisoners of Time" where they join other past companions and versions of the Doctor in battling the main villains of the series. During a battle with some Autons, 11 introduces them to Clara Oswald.

Amy Pond has appeared in several Doctor Who video games. Voiced by Gillan, she appears in all five episodes of Doctor Who: The Adventure Games which were marketed as extra episodes. The virtual character was created using rotoscoping of Gillan's movements. She also is featured, voiced by Gillan, in the 2010 video games Doctor Who: Evacuation Earth and Doctor Who: Return to Earth, made for the DS and Nintendo Wii respectively. Amy also appears in the smartphone app game Doctor Who: The Mazes of Time.

== Characterisation ==
=== Creation and casting ===
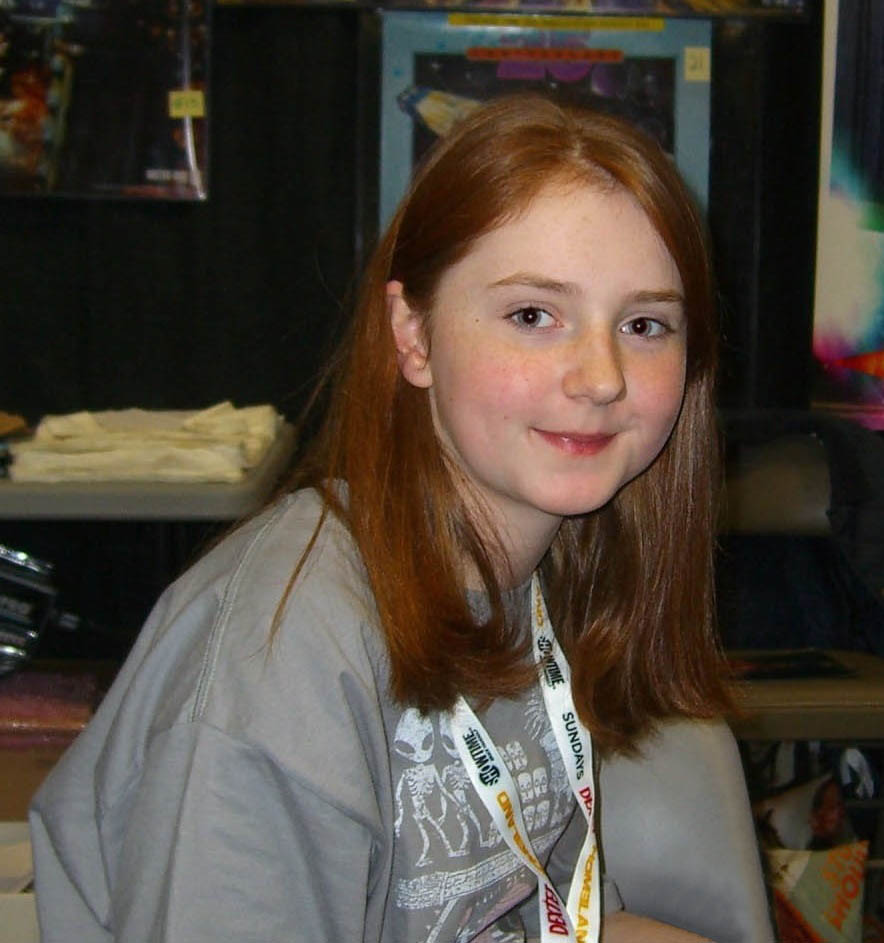
Young Amy, whom the Doctor first meets, was played by Caitlin Blackwood, Karen Gillan's real-life cousin.

Doctor Who executive producer and head writer Steven Moffat came up with the name for the character. Moffat chose the name "Pond" to create a link between Amy and River Song, who would be revealed to be Amy's daughter. Moffat's predecessor, Russell T Davies, stated in an interview with Dose magazine that "We've held off on companions for a long time, so you'll get rewarded with a great, big, strong character in Amy Pond, when she arrives. I think that plan's been good."

Andy Pryor, the casting director, suggested Gillan to Moffat after her performance in the fourth series episode "The Fires of Pompeii", in which she played a soothsayer, but Moffat originally thought Gillan was "short and dumpy". Later, however, he stated that she was "exactly right for the role", though she portrayed the character differently from how Moffat originally wrote. Gillan was reportedly the last to audition for the role, and stood out as she was "a bit kookier" than the others. Moffat said of the casting, "We saw some amazing actresses for this part. But when Karen came through the door, the game was up — she was funny, clever, gorgeous and sexy. Or Scottish, which is the quick way of saying it. A generation of little girls will want to be her. And a generation of little boys will want them to be her too." Doctor Who executive producer and drama chief at BBC Wales Piers Wenger concurred, "We knew Karen was perfect for the role the moment we saw her. She brought an energy and excitement to the part that was just fantastic." Gillan was aware of the show but was not as big a fan of it as her mother was, due to it not being on when she was growing up. However, she watched some with her mother after it returned in 2005, and was also a fan of other science fiction such as The X-Files, The Outer Limits, Star Trek: The Next Generation and Star Trek: Voyager.

Gillan auditioned for the role in both her natural Scottish accent and an English one, and it was not until after she was cast that it was decided Amy would be Scottish. Gillan commented that she felt the Scottish accent better suited the character. A younger version of Amy, known as "Amelia", appears in several episodes. Amelia was played by Gillan's real-life 10-year-old cousin Caitlin Blackwood. Though the two actresses had not met until the set of the show, Gillan recommended Blackwood for the role; Blackwood, however, still had to undergo rigorous auditions first. Blackwood and Gillan did get to act together in "The Big Bang", which Gillan initially found "weird", though the two actresses became used to it quickly.

=== Personality and character arc ===
"That's been what I absolutely most love about playing this character, is that she's not just a character. We know what she's like, and that's her run on the show. We're seeing her whole life pan out. That's what I love about her so much. I hope she's changing. She was quite snarky in the [fifth series]...Because she was always still such a child inside, as one of the monsters said to her at one point. And then we see the universe rebooted, so she's got two different versions of reality, so she's still a little messed-up, but she's far more settled as a person, having had a normal upbringing in one reality. She's married, and she has a kid."

— Karen Gillan

Gillan stated that "having read the first episode I was utterly smitten [with the show], and with the character. Amy's a sassy lady, funny and passionate, and her relationship with the Doctor has a really interesting dynamic". Gillan believed that the Doctor still saw Amy as the same seven-year-old girl he first met, and described their relationship as brother and sister, with Amy sometimes acting as an "annoying little sister". She also did not want Amy, like previous companions, to stand around "in awe of the Doctor all the time" or "mope around" while he was not there; Amy would "do her own thing, whether it's fighting monsters in strange new worlds or just getting on with her life in her own village". During her first series, Gillan wanted Amy to act "like a child in an adult body" because she had not properly grown up. She appears more guarded because "she doesn't like to show her emotions because she wants to be strong". However, she begins her second series as a more settled person, and shows more emotion, especially with the birth of her daughter.

Gillan had substantial input into Amy's costume, as well as her hair and make-up. In the first episode, costume designer Ray Holman stated that Amy's identity was not clear and that she wore her own clothes later on. Gillan thought that Amy had inner confidence to wear clothes that showed "a bit of skin from time to time". Gillan said she tried on many things, but when it came to short skirts she "just thought it was right" and showed that Amy was "comfortable and confident about her look". She believed that the skirts reflected what young women typically wear at her age. Executive producer Piers Wenger also noted that Amy's 1970s flying jacket, which she wears "quite a lot", reflected Gillan was a "born adventurer" and Amy developed a love for travel and adventure. In the sixth series, Amy wears more jeans and longer trousers; Gillan stated, "she's getting a little bit more tomboyish as she becomes more of an action girl". Amy never wears heels, as Gillan desired that the footwear be functional for saving the world.

Karen Gillan promoting Doctor Who at the 2012 San Diego Comic-Con International

As the Doctor accidentally did not return for her until twelve years later, Amy grew up a different person than she would have. She had become "cynical" and "distrustful" as the Doctor did not return as he had promised and she was forced to believe he was just an imaginary friend, and had resorted to being "tough". Moffat theorised that Amy would have taken her anger out on Rory and would have been "mean" about things such as Santa Claus and the Tooth Fairy. The second episode, "The Beast Below", was to introduce Amy into the role of the Doctor's companion and how much he needed one. Though Amy soon tries to seduce the Doctor, Moffat believed that it was consistent with the cynical character he had built up. It was also a reflection of how the two had just escaped from death and shared a hard time together, and Amy's tendency to do things "in the heat of the moment". In "Amy's Choice", meant to challenge the Doctor and Amy's relationship, Rory dies in an alternate universe that was a result of psychic pollen that had entered the TARDIS. This is when Amy truly realises her feelings for Rory. As a primary part of the series' story arc, Rory officially dies and is erased from history and Amy's memory. Though Rory later returns, he is an Auton duplicate who kills her, which reflected Moffat's belief that all good love stories end in tragedy. The end of "The Big Bang", in which Amy stands up at her wedding and declares the Doctor is real, was the Doctor's success at restoring Amy to the spirit of the girl he first met.

Moffat had always intended for Amy and Rory to get married "from the off". Gillan stated, "What I love about that relationship is that we really saw it develop to get to the stage where they were happy together. Because we started off at a point where Amy didn't want to be committed to him, and he absolutely did, and that just gave us somewhere to go with it, rather than just them being happy together. So it was interesting, and it evolved, and Rory really became a hero in the process". She was pleased that the audience was able to see Amy's life "pan out", starting when she was a child and through her marriage and daughter. Gillan stated that the aftermath of "A Good Man Goes to War" would "change her in a big way for the long run and I think we are going to get to see Amy in a really different light". According to Moffat, by the seventh series, Amy and Rory had become "a crack team"; so used to being the Doctor's companions that instead of marvelling at him they "treat him like a big kid they have to look after".

In December 2011, it was announced that the seventh series would be Amy and Rory's last. Previously in November, Gillan had stated that once Amy had left, she did not want to make returning cameos, as she believed it would "take away from the big, emotional goodbye". Gillan had arranged her exit with Moffat and the two decided on how Amy should leave. Gillan stated that she wanted to go "on a high when the character was at her prime" and that she "[wanted] to see her go with everything that she wants". Gillan made a brief appearance at the end of the 2013 Christmas special, "The Time of the Doctor", with Amy Pond saying a final goodbye to the Eleventh Doctor just before he regenerates, bringing actors Gillan and Matt Smith together for a brief moment at the conclusion of Smith's last regular appearance as the Doctor.

== Reception ==
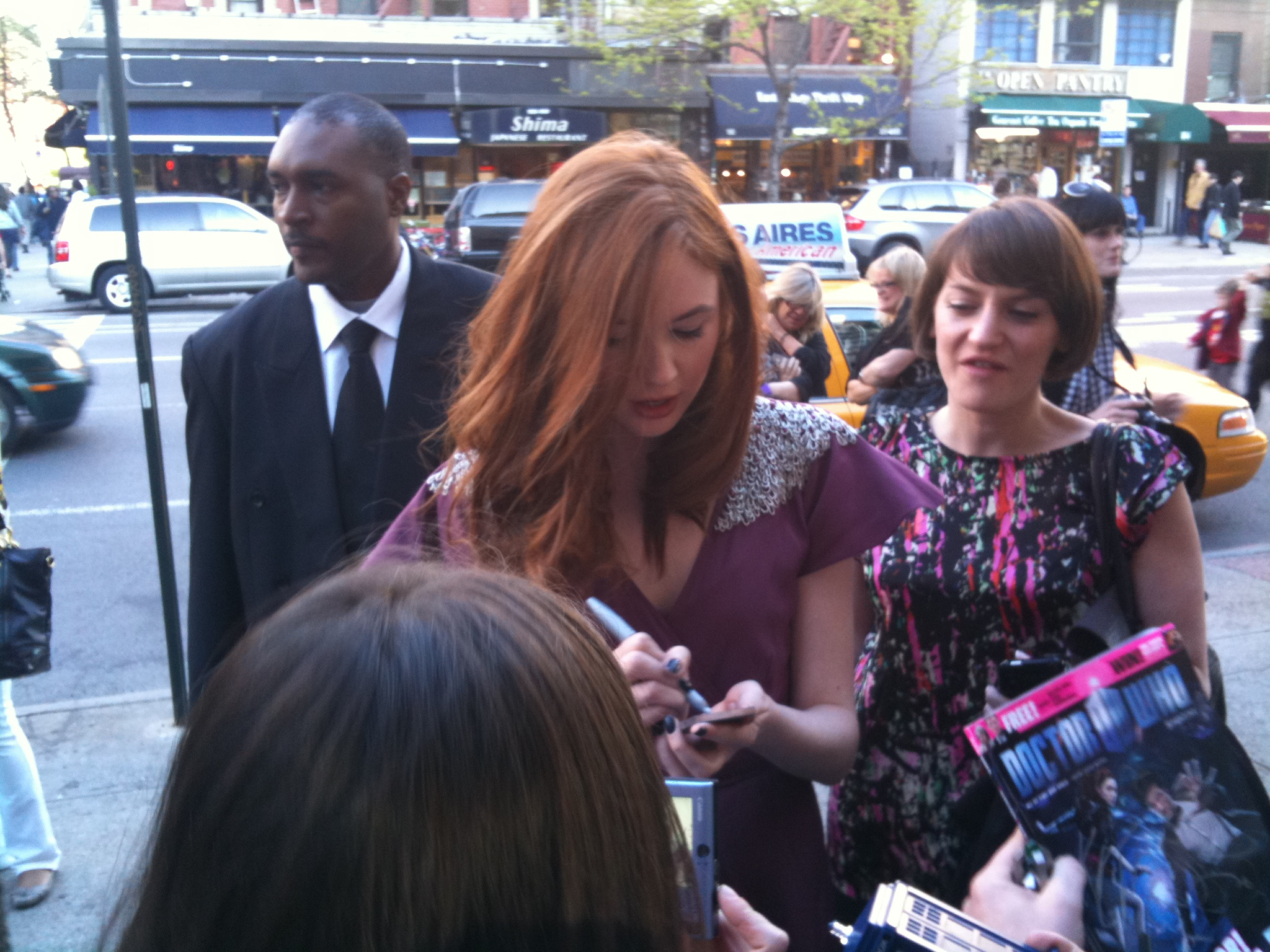
Gillan signing autographs at the US premiere of "The Eleventh Hour"

With the premiere of "The Eleventh Hour", two viewers anonymously quoted in The Telegraph complained that Amy's character was too "sexy" for a family programme like Doctor Who. Executive producer Piers Wenger stated that Amy was intended to be "feisty and outspoken and a bit of a number. Amy is probably the wildest companion that the Doctor has travelled with, but she isn’t promiscuous." On a similar note, Gavin Fuller, writing for The Daily Telegraph's website, criticised Amy's "attempted seduction of the Doctor" in the episode "Flesh and Stone", claiming that it "did seem out of keeping with the usual tone of the series", and that "Given the number of young children who watch, it may not have been the most appropriate of scenes to screen".

Critics noted that Amy did not develop much throughout the 2010 series. Dan Martin of The Guardian, in a mid-series review, wrote, "I wonder whether I really know Amy Pond. Beneath the sass and the sauce and the wit and (there's no getting away from this) the skirts, I've yet to completely empathise with her, or work out what makes her tick". In a review before the finale, Martin called her "a revelation", although she sometimes "felt a little one note...But I'd put all of that down to guest writers responding to a character brief that probably said little more than 'feisty redhead'". IGN's Matt Wales shared similar sentiments, writing, "Despite Gillan's effortless charisma, Pond was frequently painted in largely two-dimensional strokes that made for a brash, sometimes irritating turn. It's testament to Gillan's abilities and brilliant chemistry with Smith that she remained thoroughly watchable throughout but, bereft of back story (albeit intentionally), it was hard to really get involved with the character". Paul Kerton of Zap2it, however, wrote in a review of "The Eleventh Hour" that Amy's "brilliantly executed introduction to the show stood out. Amy's character after just one episode is already one with depth". Tor.com's Teresa Jusino was also more positive towards Amy in the fifth series, writing that she was equally "competent, intelligent, and [quick-thinking]" as she was flawed and made mistakes, which made her relatable and "a successful female character".

Chris Haydon of Den of Geek argued that Amy was "much more than the supposed eye candy many journalists unfairly referred to her as, or indeed much more than a female human to accompany the Gallifreyan Time Lord. She is far more three-dimensional and developed than the pre-existing judgements made her out to be". He also praised Gillan's acting abilities and the way her relationship with Rory helped "render [her] character into something quite special". The Daily Telegraph's Michael Hogan considered Amy "the joint best assistant of the rebooted Who era – far superior to Catherine Tate and Freema Agyeman, equally as excellent as Billie Piper". He also praised her relationship with the Doctor, saying that they were "totally believable as best friends". Patrick Mulkern of Radio Times praised Amy for being "cheerfully free...of the emotional baggage that mired her predecessors" and also reacted positively to her attempted seduction of the Doctor. SFX named Amy and Rory the second-best science fiction and fantasy romance. In 2012, leading up to her departure, Martin wrote that Gillan's acting had improved, becoming less of "a rootless collection of personality traits and enunciated sentence peaks" and someone more rounded. He also noted that Amy was unique because so much had happened to her and she became entwined in the Doctor's life, which allowed the audience to see her "develop and change".

The Guardian's Krystina Nellis argued that Amy functioned more as a plot prop than a strong female character, citing the importance of giving birth to River Song. Charlie Jane Anders of io9, while positive towards her relationship with Rory, opined that Amy was still "a bit of a cartoon character" in "The Wedding of River Song", believing that her killing Madame Kovarian was "no substitute" for dealing with what Kovarian had done to her child. Sarah Barrett from The Mary Sue had mixed feelings about Amy's storyline regarding the birth of River, particularly due to its dark nature. Screen Rant's Kayleigh Banks criticised problematic elements of Amy and Rory's characterizations, particularly how "her character seem as if she couldn't function without (the Doctor)", her "careers were randomly wedged" and "reduced to a typical damsel in distress" (especially her family, who is strangely never seen again after being restored). Gillan repeatedly defended Moffat's writing for her character in a rebuke against claims of misogyny in Moffat's writing.

The character has gone on to be referenced in popular culture. In American drama Supernatural's seventh season episode "The Girl Next Door" (2011), a character played by Jewel Staite operates under the alias Amy Pond. Digital Spy felt the Doctor Who reference was "rather random", while IGN "loved" the shoutout.

Gillan has won over six awards to date for playing the role of Amy Pond. In 2010 she won a Cosmopolitan 'Women of the Year' Award. In 2011 Gillan won an SFX Award, a TV Choice Award, and in 2012 she won at the National Television Awards. In an online poll, with 3,000 participants, taken in late 2010, Amy Pond was listed as the fifth most popular companion.
