= Patagonia (film) =

- Promotional poster
- Directed by: Marc Evans
- Written by: Laurence Coriat; Marc Evans
- Produced by: Rebekah Gilbertson; Flora Fernandez-Marengo
- Starring: Matthew Rhys; Nia Roberts; Duffy
- Cinematography: Robbie Ryan
- Edited by: Mali Evans
- Music by: Joseph LoDuca
- Production company: Rainy Day Films
- Distributed by: Verve Pictures (UK)
- Release dates: 10 June 2010 (SIFF); 4 March 2011 (UK)
- Running time: 119 minutes
- Countries: Wales; Argentina
- Languages: Welsh; Spanish; English

Patagonia is a 2010 Welsh-Argentine drama film co-written and directed by Marc Evans. The story centres on Welsh and Argentine people connected to "Y Wladfa", the Welsh settlement in Patagonia, Argentina. The film stars several well-known Welsh actors including Matthew Rhys, Nia Roberts and the singer Duffy in her film debut. It premiered at the Seattle International Film Festival on 10 June 2010 and had its UK premiere in Cardiff on 4 March 2011.

It was selected as the British entry for Best Foreign Language Film at the 84th Academy Awards, but it did not make the final shortlist.

== Synopsis ==
Gwen and Rhys are a Welsh-speaking couple living in Cardiff where Rhys works as a photographer and Gwen is employed as a historical interpreter at a local Welsh cultural centre. Gwen is also an aspiring actress and although she periodically attends auditions, she has yet to be hired for a theatrical part. The couple's inability to conceive a child has caused increasing tension between them. Hoping to reinvigorate their relationship, the pair decide to travel together to southern Argentina where Rhys has been commissioned to photograph the historic Welsh chapels in Patagonia, a vast windswept landscape which was a destination for Welsh immigrants in the late 19th and early 20th centuries. While there, they are served by their local Welsh-Argentine guide, Mateo.

Meanwhile, an elderly Welsh-Argentine woman named Cerys is planning a trip to Wales to discover the farm where her mother was raised before emigrating to Patagonia during the 1920s. She decides to take along her agoraphobic young neighbour Alejandro to assist her. In Wales, he finds romance with a local girl, Sissy.

== Cast ==
- Matthew Gravelle as Rhys
- Nia Roberts as Gwen
- Matthew Rhys as Mateo
- Marta Lubos as Cerys
- Nahuel Pérez Biscayart as Alejandro
- Duffy as Sissy
- Marco Antonio Caponi as Diego
- Rhys Parry Jones as Martín
- Gabriela Ferrero as Eleonora
- Marcin Kwaśny as Marc
- Radosław Kaim as Kris

== Production ==
Matthew Rhys found out about the role under unusual circumstances. In 2005, he was in Patagonia on horseback with descendants of the region's original Welsh settlers; during the trip, he met director Marc Evans, who was there scouting for locations.

== Reception ==
Following a screening at the 2010 Mill Valley Film Festival, Dennis Harvey of Variety said "Patagonia unspools two parallel narratives connected only by a historical anomaly .... While its separate parts may not quite add up, they complement each other quite pleasingly." He also notes "Evans nimbly cuts between the two unhurried threads, which form a nice textural contrast in d.p. Robbie Ryan's lensing of the disparate landscapes—one all lush, verdant hills, the other rich in desert hues. Jumping back and forth also helps balance out stories that might have seemed insubstantial if each stood alone." Another critic at Mill Valley, Sura Wood of The Hollywood Reporter, called it an "intermittently diverting road movie, whose alternation between parallel storylines grows tedious over the course of its two-hour running time"; Patagonia is "somewhat redeemed by gorgeous cinematography of far flung locations not often seen in movies, and fine performances from its cast."

The Independent described it as "two road movies for the price of one, running the parallel stories of pilgrims on a search for identity"; the film is "wonderfully shot by Robbie Ryan (Fish Tank)" and "displays a lyrical sensitivity both to the desert landscapes of Patagonia and to the remote, rain-glazed hills of Wales, and the unlikeliness of their ancient connection (the Welsh settled in Patagonia in 1865) becomes rather moving."
