= Plantasia =

Plantasia Tropical Zoo
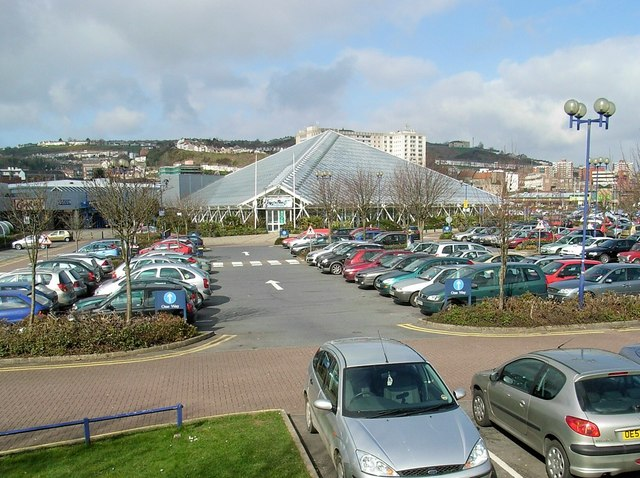
- Plantasia
- Interactive map of Plantasia Tropical Zoo
- 51°37′18.00″N 3°56′19.00″W
- Date opened: 1990
- Location: Swansea, Wales
- No. of animals: >60
- No. of species: >40
- Website: www.swansea.gov.uk/plantasia

Plantasia Tropical Zoo is a large public hothouse exhibiting tropical plants and animals, located in the Parc Tawe retail park, Swansea, Wales. It opened in 1990.

== Information ==
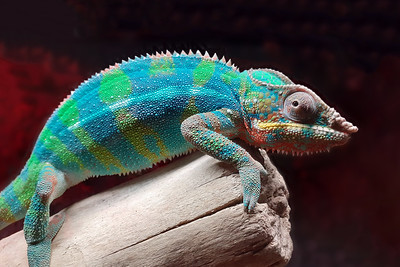
Panther chameleon at Plantasia

Plantasia exhibits a wide range of tropical plants, insects, reptiles, amphibians, mammals and fish. There is also a cafeteria and an education room.

The glasshouse contains two climate zones: Tropical with a rainforest, and Arid. The collection includes over 600 different plants totalling around 5,000 plants, some of which are endangered in their natural habitat. Plant types include palms, bananas, giant bamboo, various fruiting plants including limes and many epiphytes including bromeliads, orchids and aroids, there is also a small collection of cacti and succulents in the arid zone.

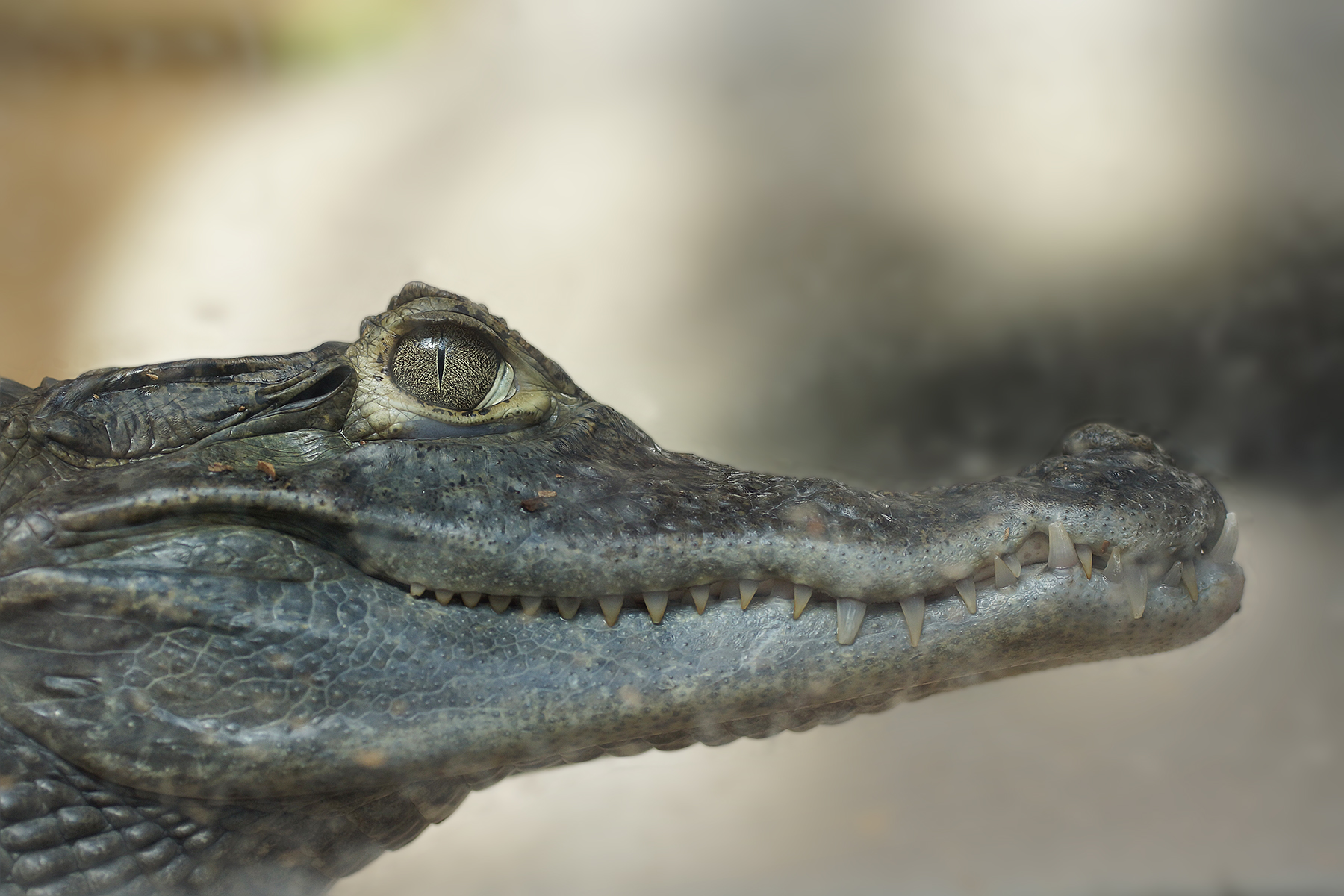
Spectacled Caiman

Along with the plants, there is supporting wildlife including Emperor tamarin, meerkats, crested geckos, tarantulas, red-bellied piranhas, koi carp, green-winged macaw, white-cheeked turacos, amphibians, reptiles, and several different snakes including a large Burmese python. Additionally, Plantasia houses an Asian leopard cat, Spectacled caimans and critically endangered Kleinmann's tortoises.

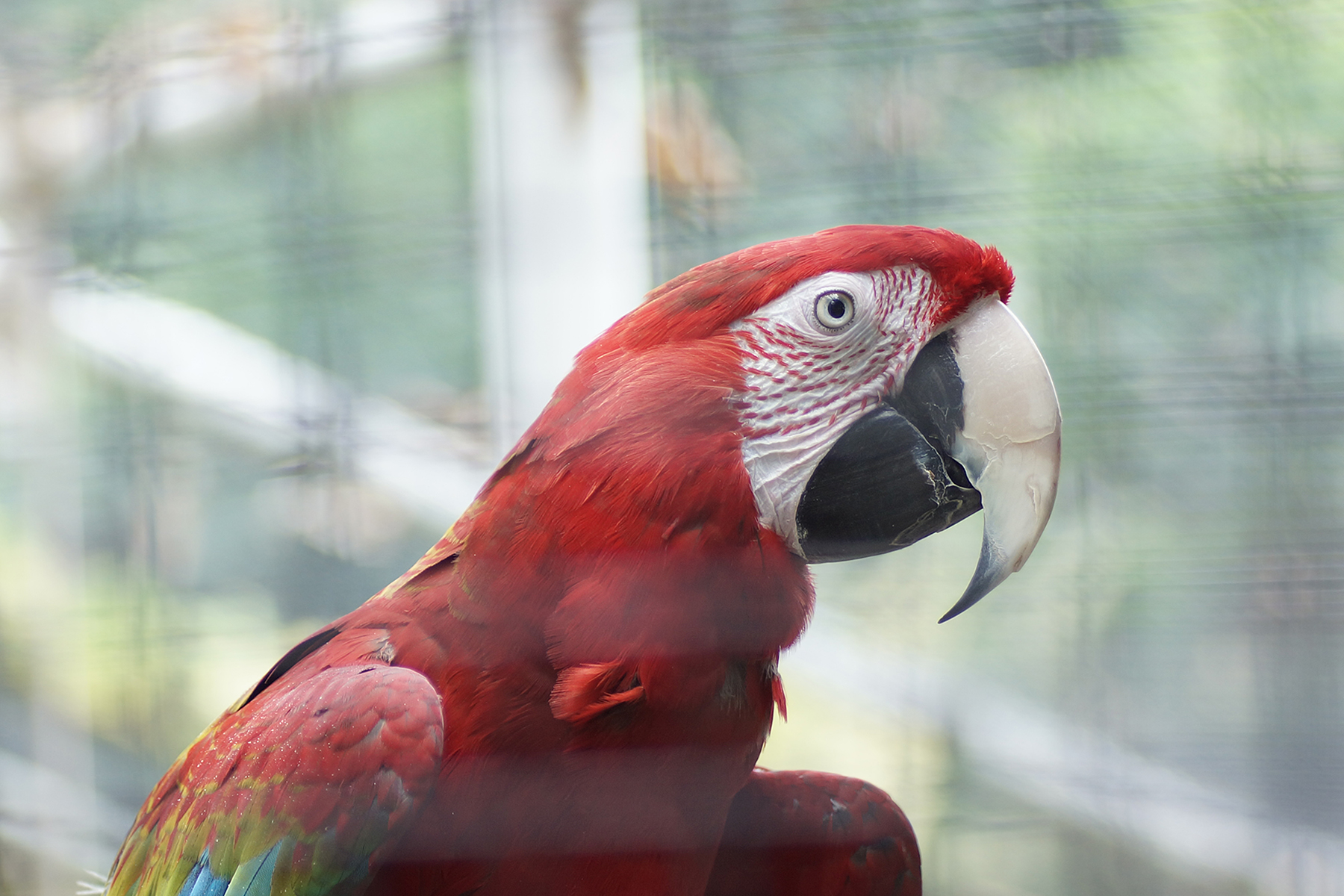
Green-winged Macaw

In 2019, Plantasia added many new features to its exhibits. These included a new cafeteria and gift shop. Within the glasshouse new additions included a waterfall lookout, rainforest hut, living bridge and interactive educational exhibits.

In 2026 a new area was added, 'Vital Venoms and Practical Poisons', highlighting the roles both animals and plants play in the world of medical developments. Some new animals included in this area include Oriental fire-bellied toads, Checkered garter snakes and a Mangrove snake.

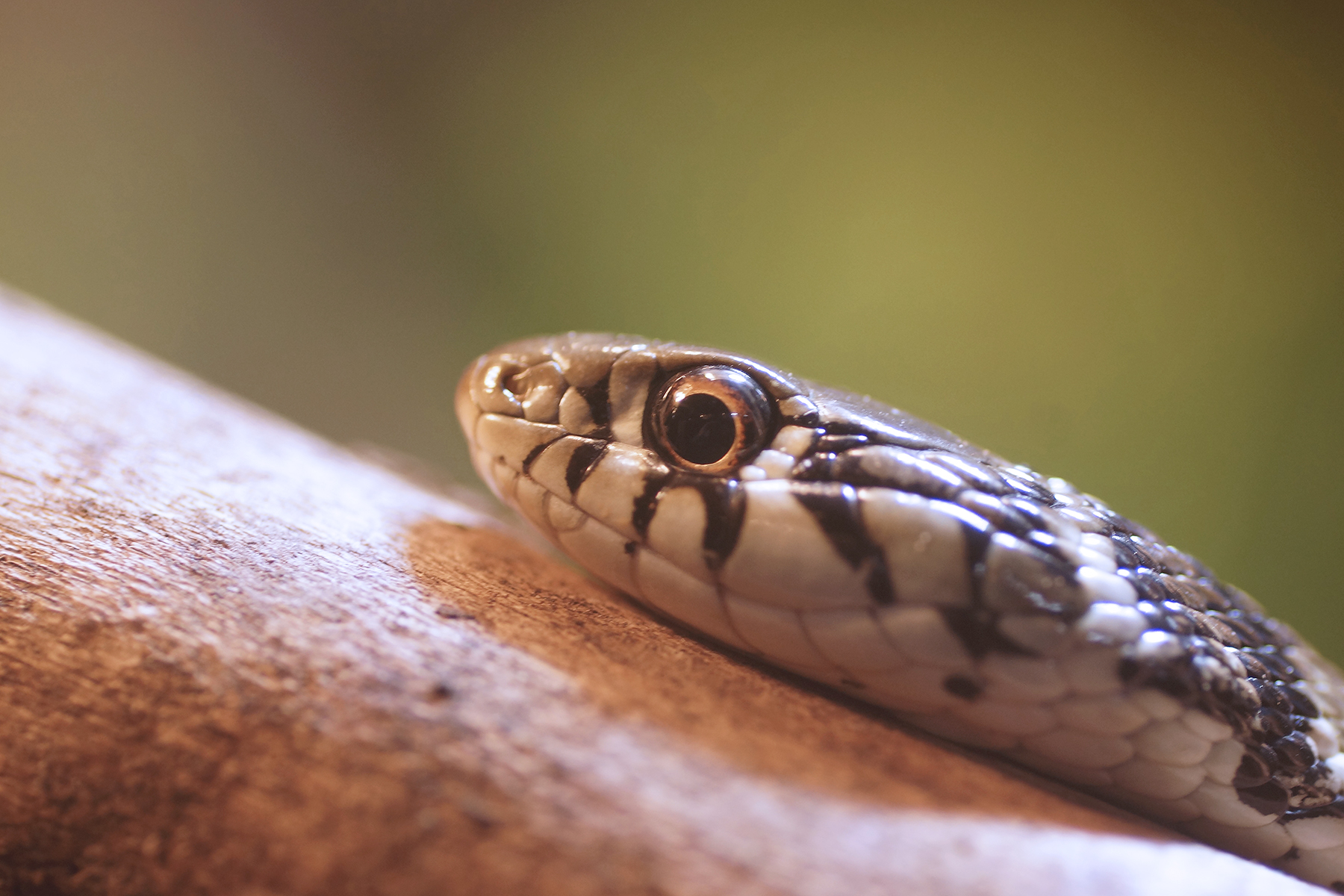
Checkered Garter Snake

== Filming location ==
Plantasia was used as a filming location for the Doctor Who episodes "The Doctor's Daughter" (on 21 December 2007) and "Cold Blood" (on 13 November 2009).
