= Star Trek: The Next Generation/Doctor Who: Assimilation² =

Comic book crossover

Star Trek: The Next Generation/Doctor Who: Assimilation^{2}

Publication information
- Publisher: IDW Publishing
- Schedule: Monthly
- Format: Limited series
- Publication date: May – December 2012
- No. of issues: 8
- Main characters: Eleventh Doctor; Jean-Luc Picard; Amy Pond; Rory Williams; William Riker; Data; Worf; Cybermen; Borg

Creative team
- Written by: Scott & David Tipton; Tony Lee
- Artist: J. K. Woodward

Star Trek: The Next Generation/Doctor Who: Assimilation^{2} is an eight-issue, limited series comic book from IDW Publishing. The first official comics crossover of the science fiction TV series Doctor Who and Star Trek: The Next Generation, it sees the Eleventh Doctor and his companions, Amy Pond and Rory Williams, encounter and team up with the crew of the USS Enterprise-D to stop an alliance between the Borg and the Cybermen.

The series was written by Scott and David Tipton, assisted by Tony Lee on issues 1 to 4. The story art was created by J. K. Woodward and the cover art by Woodward and David Messina. Star Trek: The Next Generation/Doctor Who: Assimilation^{2} was Doctor Who's first major official crossover since the 1993 charity special Dimensions in Time.

The series was announced in February 2012 and its first issue went on sale on 30 May, with subsequent issues being released monthly until December 2012. The issues were also collected in two graphic novels published on 9 October 2012 and 26 February 2013. Plans for a sequel, which would have paired Doctor Who and Star Trek: Deep Space Nine, were cancelled following the expiry of IDW's Doctor Who comics license, which it had held since about 2006.

== Plot ==
On stardate 45635.2 (falling between the stardates of The Next Generation episodes "The Outcast" and "Cause and Effect"), the Federation planet Delta IV comes under attack from a combined force of Borg and the Cybermen who were first seen in "Rise of the Cybermen". This prompted a planetary evacuation.

Meanwhile, the TARDIS, with the Eleventh Doctor, Amy Pond, and Rory Williams inside, somehow crosses between universes and lands on the holodeck of the Enterprise-D. Though confused at having new memories from this universe, the Doctor meets with the ship's captain, Jean-Luc Picard, and they soon discover the Borg/Cybermen alliance. However, the Cybermen quickly turn on the Borg, prompting the Borg to ask Picard for assistance, to which he reluctantly agrees. Among the new memories the Doctor recalls is how his fourth incarnation encountered an earlier generation of Cybermen alongside James T. Kirk and his Enterprise.

The Enterprise crew begins work on adding gold to its weapons, since it is effective against Cybermen, while the TARDIS goes back in time to retrieve a vital piece of Borg technology that had been lost to the Cybermen. A strike force led by the Doctor and Picard then infiltrates the Cybermen's main vessel and, with the help of the Enterprise's gold-enhanced weapons, defeats the Cybermen. The Doctor and his companions return to their own universe aboard the TARDIS; meanwhile the Borg, intrigued by the Doctor, decide to investigate time travel.

== Reception ==
Joey Esposito of IGN described the series as "a crossover that genre fans have been awaiting for decades". Reviewing the first issue, he predicted that the "near-photorealistic" artwork would prove controversial among readers. He rated the issue 7 out of 10.

Paul Mount of Starburst was negative in his assessment, stating in his review of issue 7: "If IDW are tempted to cross-pollinate these two sci-fi giants again, they might want to take a bit more time to come up with a story which makes the writing, drawing and reading of it worth the effort, because this just has the stink of a lazy vanity project about it, and fans of both franchises were undoubtedly expecting and deserving quite a bit more."

A 2024 Den of Geek article commented that the comic series had been "a good demonstration of the potential rewards and pitfalls of a TARDIS/Enterprise team-up", noting that while it offers some "neat ideas" and "good fan-servicey bits", its main weakness lies in the characterisations: "[T]he Doctor and the Enterprise crew quickly become just too damn chummy."

ComicBook.com commented that while "extremely fun to read", the series "also revealed the difficulties of balancing two enormous franchises and their respective tones." It was pointed out that as the Doctor Who TV series had included verbal references to Star Trek, the comic writers "had to invent a suitably elaborate 'universes merging' explanation to smooth things over" and maintain continuity.
