= Robert Pugh =

British actor (born 1948)

- Born: 3 November 1948 (age 77); Tyntetown, Glamorgan, Wales
- Education: Rose Bruford College
- Occupation: Actor
- Years active: 1976–present

Robert Pugh (born 3 November 1948) is a Welsh actor, known for his many television appearances, including the role of Craster in the HBO series Game of Thrones.

== Life and career ==
Pugh was born in Tyntetown, Mountain Ash and attended Ynysboeth school down the road and grew up with his grandmother in Tynte, near Pontypridd. He decided to become an actor after watching From Russia with Love at a cinema in Treforest with a cousin. A few years later he took night courses at Mountview Academy of Theatre Arts in North London, before being accepted at Rose Bruford College, where he graduated in 1976. He appeared in the 1979 production of Danger UXB as Sapper Powell, a young Royal Engineer in a Bomb Disposal Company during the Second World War. He later appeared as Harold Wilson in the 2005 Channel 4 drama Longford and as Hermann Göring in the 2006 BBC drama-documentary Nuremberg: Nazis on Trial. In 2007, he co-starred alongside Genevieve O'Reilly and Geraldine James in the ITV1 drama The Time of Your Life, in which he played a father whose 36-year-old daughter is recovering after an 18-year coma. In his early career, he frequently appeared in Welsh language productions, for example as Edgar Evans in the 1984 TV film Terra Nova, and as a soldier in Karl Francis's Milwr Bychan (1987). Even in more recent years, he has often portrayed Welsh characters, such as Owain Glyndwr in the 2012 BBC adaptation of Henry IV, Part I.

In 2010, Pugh appeared as Tony in the two-part Doctor Who story comprising the episodes "The Hungry Earth" and "Cold Blood". He had a supporting role in 2008 in an episode of Torchwood, another BBC Wales production.

In 2011 Pugh became Judge Patrick Coburn in Justice. The following year he joined HBO's Game of Thrones in the recurring role of Craster. In 2013 he portrayed Baron Rivers in The White Queen. Pugh played Jack Reynolds in Doctor Foster, and in 2016 joined the cast of Mr Selfridge as Lord Wynstay, another Welsh character.

In April 2023, Pugh returned to Casualty having originally played paramedic Andrew Pointing in the show's first two series. He played Gethin West, the estranged ex-husband to series regular Jan Jenning, played by Di Botcher. He departed the series again in September later that year, with the character choosing to end his life at a clinic in Switzerland.

== Filmography ==
=== Film ===
Year	Title	Role	Notes
1981	Inseminoid	Roy	
1981	Nighthawks	Kenna	
1982	Britannia Hospital	Picket	
1982	Giro City	John Williams	
1987	Milwr Bychan	R.S.M.	
1989	The Angry Earth	Emlyn	
1991	Old Scores	Bleddyn Morgan	
1994	Priest	Mr. Unsworth	
1995	The Englishman Who Went Up a Hill; But Came Down a Mountain	Williams the Petroleum	
1995	The Near Room	Eddie Harte	
1996	Different for Girls	DS Cole	
1997	Eating Bitter	Michael Slater	
1998	The Tichbourne Claimant	The Claimant	
2000	The Testimony of Taliesin Jones	Handycott	
2001	Enigma	Skynner	
2001	Happy Now?	Hank Thomas	
2002	The Intended	Le Blanc	
2002	Plots with a View	Hugh Rhys-Jones	
2003	Master and Commander: The Far Side of the World	John Allen	
2005	Kinky Boots	Harold Price	
2005	Kingdom of Heaven	Godfrey's Elder Brother	Director's cut
2007	The Last Legion	Kustennin	
2008	Goodnight Irene	Alex	
2010	The Ghost Writer	Richard Rycart	
2010	Robin Hood	Baron Baldwin	
2010	West Is West	Mr. Jordan	
2012	Hunky Dory	Headmaster	Credited as Bob Hugh
2012	Love Bite	Sergeant Rooney	
2012	Metamorphosis	Mr. Samsa	
2017	Canaries	Jenkins	
2018	Colette	Jules	
2019	Eternal Beauty	Dennis	

=== Television ===
Year	Title	Role	Notes
1976	Angels	John	Episode: "Facade"
1977	Survivors	Terry	Episode: "Mad Dog"
1979	SOS Titanic	James Farrell	Television film
1979	Danger UXB	Sapper Powell	12 episodes
1981	The Bunker	Turnow	Television film
1982	Squadron	Puma Crewman	Episode: "Operation Flamingo"
1983	Storyboard	D.I. Roy Galloway	Episode: "Woodentop"
1984	Amy	Jack Humphreys	Television film
1984	Terra Nova	PO Edgar Evans	Television film
1984	Winter Flight	Military Policeman	Television film
1985–1986	Brookside	John Clarke	8 episodes
1986–1987	Casualty	Andrew Ponting	Recurring role
1988	Dramarama	Ripper Williams	Episode: "Playing for Wales"
1988	Deadline	Williams	Television film
1989	Screen Two	Insp. Trickey	Episode: "Here Is the News"
1992	Inspector Morse	Geoff Harris - Prison Officer	Episode: "Absolute Conviction"
1993	Telltale	Billy Hodge	3 episodes
1993	Thicker than Water	Paul	Television film
1993	Bookmark	Gwyn's Father	Episode: "Selected Exits"
1993	Screen One	Keith Dobbs	Episode: "Tender Loving Care"
1993	Chris Cross	Mr. Koufax	Episode: "Revolution 101"
1995	A Mind to Murder	D.C.I. Martin	Television film
1995	The Bill	Frank Jackson	Episode: "Powerless"
1995	Resort to Murder	Danny McCrae	4 episodes
1996	Murder Most Horrid	D.I. Morgan	Episode: "A Life of Death Operation"
1996	Bramwell	Mr. Sullivan	Episode #2.7
1997	Drovers' Gold	Handl	5 episodes
1997	Dangerfield	Clay Puller	Episode: "Inappropriate Adults"
1997	A Dance to the Music of Time	Biggs	Episode: "The War"
1997–1999	The Lakes	Father Matthew	14 episodes
1998	Where the Heart Is	Bill Bowen	Episode: "Darkness Follows"
1999	Silent Witness	Leslie Peterson	2 episodes
1999	French and Saunders		Episode: "Witless Silence"
2001	Sword of Honour	Brig. Ritchie-Hook	Television film
2001	In A Land Of Plenty	Charles Freeman	9 episodes
2002	Clocking Off	Alan Preston	4 episodes
2002	Helen West	Lycett	Episode: "Shadow Play"
2003	Prime Suspect	DS Alun Simms	Episode: "The Last Witness"
2003	Waking the Dead	Robert Cross	Episode: "Multistorey"
2004	Hustle	Frank Gorley	Episode: "Faking It"
2004	New Tricks	Eric Grant	Episode: "Home Truths"
2005	Agatha Christie's Marple	Colonel Easterbrook	Episode: "A Murder Is Announced"
2005	Uncle Adolf	Gregor Strasser	Television film
2005	Bloodlines	D.C.I. Paul Jordan	Television film
2005	The Brief	Graham Ottway	Episode: "Lack of Affect"
2005	Bleak House	Mr. Chadband	Episode #1.4
2005	The Virgin Queen	Lord Chancellor Gardiner	Episode #1.1
2005	Shameless	Bernie Creme	Episode: "True Love"
2006	Agatha Christie's Poirot	Colonel Hughes	Episode: "Cards on the Table"
2006	Nuremberg: Nazis on Trial	Hermann Göring	3 episodes
2006	Prime Suspect	D.S. Alun Simms	Episode: "The Final Act"
2006	Longford	Harold Wilson	Television film
2007	The Time of Your Life	Toby	Main role
2007	The Whistleblowers	Alan Thorpe	Episode: "Starters"
2008	Torchwood	Jonah	Episode: "Adrift"
2008	Lark Rise to Candleford	Walter Arless	2 episodes
2008	Silent Witness	Stephen Harrington	2 episodes
2009	Robin Hood	Lord Sheridan	Episode: "The King Is Dead, Long Live the King..."
2009	Into the Storm	General Ismay	Television film
2009	Framed	Mr. Davis	Television film
2010	Doctor Who	Tony Mack	Episodes: "The Hungry Earth" and "Cold Blood"
2010	Accused	Peter MacShane Senior	Episode: "Frankie's Story"
2010	Accidental Farmer	Dr. Willis	Television film
2011	Justice	Judge Patrick Coburn	Miniseries; 5 episodes
2011	The Shadow Line	Bob Harris	4 episodes
2011	Midsomer Murders	Caradoc Singer	Episode: "The Sleeper Under the Hill"
2011	Death in Paradise	Mike Watson	Episode: "Wicked Wedding Night"
2012	The Hollow Crown	Glendower	Episode: "Henry IV, Part I"
2012	Murder	D.I. Sheehy	Episode: "Joint Enterprise"
2012	Shameless	Malcolm	Episode: "What Are Friends For?"
2012–2013	Game of Thrones	Craster	5 episodes
2013	The White Queen	Baron Rivers	2 episodes
2013	The Thirteenth Tale	John McDigg	Television film
2014	Inspector George Gently	Chief Lewington	Episode: "Gently Between the Lines"
2014	Undeniable	Pete	2 episodes
2014	Under Milk Wood	Butcher Beynon	Television film
2014	Common	Detective Inspector Hastings	Television film
2014	Atlantis	Lord Sarpedon	2 episodes
2015	Ordinary Lies	Jack	Episode: "Beth's Story"
2015	Doctor Foster	Jack Reynolds	3 episodes
2016	Mr Selfridge	Lord Wynnstay	9 episodes
2016	Damilola, Our Loved Boy	D.C.I. Nick Ephgrave	Television film
2017	Vera	Eddie Thurston	Episode: "Dark Angel"
2018	Knightfall	Jacques de Molay	2 episodes
2018	Vanity Fair	Mr. John Osborne	6 episodes
2018	The Repair Shop	Narrator	Series 2–4
2020	Silent Witness	Robert Wilde	Episode: "Close to Home: Part 1"
2020	Strike	Geraint Winn	3 episodes
2020–2022	The Tuckers	Murphy	13 episodes
2023	Casualty	Gethin West	Recurring role

=== Audio ===
- Tracks (2017) as Sam
