= Parc Tawe =

Retail park in Swansea, Wales

Coordinates: 51°37′18″N 3°56′21″W

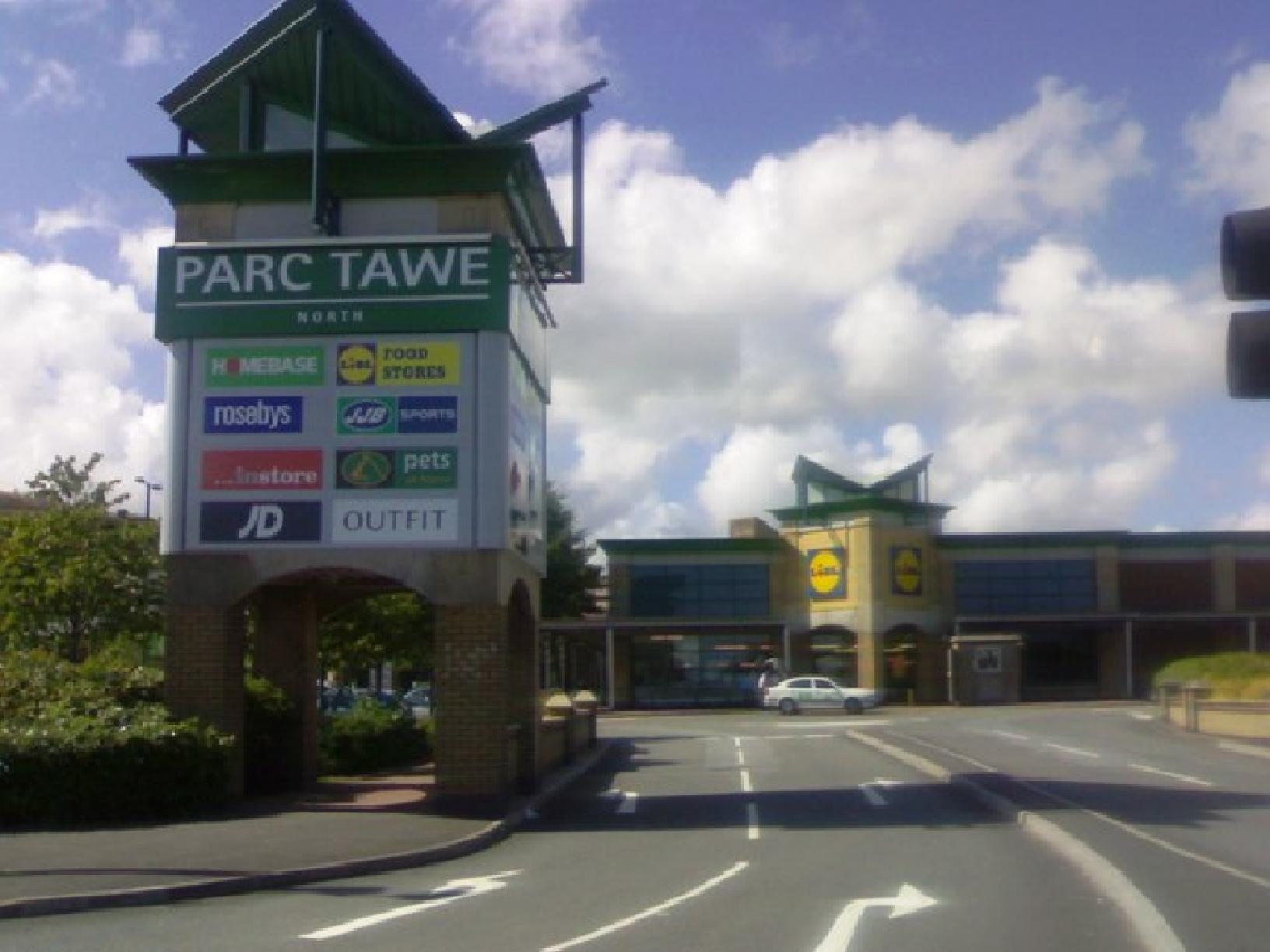
Entrance to Parc Tawe North

Parc Tawe is a retail park and leisure area in Swansea. It is located in the eastern area of the city centre on the west bank of the River Tawe in the Lower Swansea.

The area includes "out-of-town" style stores with car parks located outside the shopping area. A highly visible building in the area is the Plantasia - a large triangular tropical plant house. Entertainment in the area includes a 10 screen Odeon cinema (converted from UCI in 2006) and a ten pin bowling alley.

The area occupied by Parc Tawe was once the North Dock. The North dock was opened in 1852 becoming the first dock in the Swansea docks complex. During the 1930s changes in methods of working, reduced trade and the increasing size of ships led to the North Dock being closed and subsequently filled in. For decades the North dock area was an industrial wasteland, until re-development as a shopping complex in the late 1980s.

Parc Tawe is divided into two shopping areas separated by the road linking the Parc Tawe Bridge with Strand Row: the original Parc Tawe area and the newer Parc Tawe North. Units located in Parc Tawe include The Food Warehouse, B&M Bargains, Office Outlet and Mothercare. Retailers in Parc Tawe North include Homebase, Lidl, JD Sports, Pound Stretcher, Pets at Home, Bargain Buys and Home Bargains.

In October 2016, a proposed £15-million revamp of Parc Tawe got the green light. The new development features a drive-thru Costa coffee shop as well as the UK's first Denny's restaurant.

== Parc Tawe List ==
- UCI Cinemas (Then: Odeon Cinemas) (29 September 1989 – Present)
- MegaBowl (Then Tenpin Bowling Swansea) (29 September 1989 – Present)
