= Nia Roberts (actress) =

Welsh actress

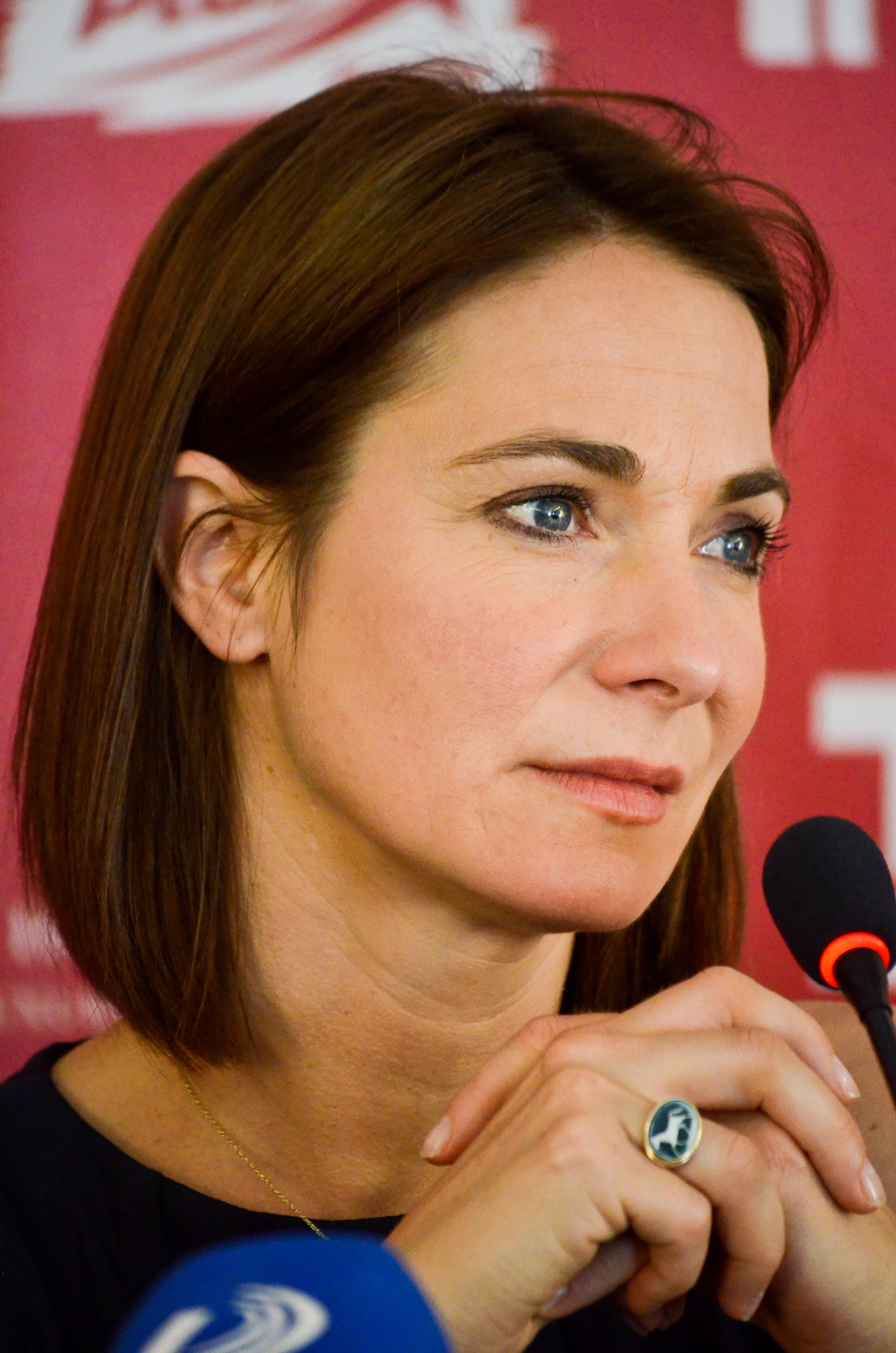
- Roberts in 2015
- Born: 5 July 1972 (age 54); Brecon, Brecknockshire, Wales
- Occupation: Actress
- Years active: 1998–present
- Spouse: Marc Evans
- Children: 2

Nia Roberts (born 5 July 1972) is a Welsh actress.

== Early life and career ==
The youngest of three girls, Roberts was born and brought up in Brecon, Powys. Her first language is Welsh, and she attended Brecon's Welsh-medium primary school Ysgol-y-Bannau from 1975 to 1983. Her family were active members of the Brecon Little Theatre amateur dramatics group, and she was seven years old when she first appeared on stage. Five years later, she landed her first television role as the lead girl in "The Farm", a 30-minute Jackanory play for BBC1.

After gaining ten GCSEs and three A Levels, she joined the National Youth Theatre of Wales. She studied acting at Birmingham University, where she passed with distinction.

== Career ==
Roberts' big break came in 1998, when she appeared in Solomon a Gaenor opposite Ioan Gruffudd. With dialogue in Welsh and Yiddish, it won Best Film at the 2000 Verona Film Festival and was nominated for Best Foreign Language Film at the 72nd Academy Awards. It was written and directed by British filmmaker Paul Morrison.

Her subsequent Welsh-language credits include Fondue, Rhyw a Deinosors!, Newes of the Weeke, Y Palmant Aur, Glan Hafren, the long-running soap opera Pobol y Cwm, and S4C's gangster drama Y Pris. Roberts' English-language television credits include the comedy series Dr. Terrible's House of Horrible, the drama Border Café, and several single-episode appearances in prime-time British shows such as The Bill and Casualty.

Roberts has starred in two films directed by her husband, Marc Evans: Snow Cake (2006), a drama focused on the friendship between a high-functioning autistic woman and a man traumatized after surviving a fatal car accident; and Patagonia (2009), a drama set in Y Wladfa, Argentina. In 2009, Roberts starred as registrar Mary Finch in Crash!, a hospital drama commissioned by BBC Wales and produced by Tony Jordan.

In 2010, Roberts guest-starred in the two-part Doctor Who Series 5 episode "The Hungry Earth/Cold Blood". More big-screen productions followed: She appeared in Hattie Dalton's Third Star (2010) and in Vertigo Films' The Facility (2012), an atmospheric, micro-budget horror film about volunteers fighting for their lives after a drug trial goes wrong.

In 2014, Roberts appeared in the fourth episode of Y Gwyll (Hinterland), a highly acclaimed noir detective series shot in both Welsh and English.

In 2026 she was cast as the voice of Aunt Beru in the Welsh dub of Star Wars: Episode IV – A New Hope.

== Personal life ==
Roberts, her husband, and their daughter, Edith, live in Cardiff. She is a supporter of Plaid Cymru.

== Filmography ==
=== Film ===
Year	Title	Role	Notes
1998	The Theory of Flight	Checkout Girl	
1999	Solomon & Gaenor	Gaenor Rees	
2000	Canone inverso	Costanza	
2005	9 Steps to a New Start	Carolyne	
2006	Snow Cake	Janet	
2006	Calon Gaeth	Miriam	
2010	Patagonia	Gwen	
2010	Third Star	Chloe	
2011	Little Munchkin	Mrs. Jones	Short
2011	Back of the Net!	Carys	Short
2012	The Facility	Katie	
2013	Mr Torquay's Holiday	Sister (voice)	Short
2015	Bridgend	Thomas' Mother	
2015	Just Jim	Mum	
2015	Under Milk Wood	Myfanwy Price	
2018	Last Summer	Sandra Davies	
2019	The Return of the Yuletide Kid	Philipa	
2021	The Feast / Gwledd	Glenda	
2026	Star Wars: Gobaith Newydd	Aunt Beru	Welsh dub of Star Wars: Episode IV – A New Hope

=== Television ===
Year	Title	Role	Notes
1984	The Farm	Menna	TV film
1987	I Fro Breuddwydion	Jenny	TV film
1996–97	Y Palamant Aur	Martha Jenkins	TV series
1999	Sunburn	Tina	Episode: "1.3"
2000	Border Café	Naomi	TV miniseries
2001	Score	Suzie	TV film
2001	Dr. Terrible's House of Horrible	Rowan Latimer	Episode: "Curse of the Blood of the Lizard of Doom"
2002	Outside the Rules	Carol Dysart	TV film
2002	The Bill	Sarah Jones	Episode: "027: Old Tricks"
2003	Casualty	Lizzie Peters	Episode: "The Point of No Return"
2003	The Welsh in Shakespeare	Various	TV film
2004–05	Holby City	Susan Curtis	Guest role (series 6–7)
2007	Y Pris	Kirsti O'Shea	Main role
2008	Midsomer Murders	Stacey Purdy	Episode: "Left for Dead"
2009	Hotel Babylon	Precious	Episode: "4.7"
2009	Collision	Linda Canwell	Episode: "1.4"
2009	Crash	Mary Finch	Episode: "1.6"
2010	Holby City	Jamie McPherson	Episode: "For the Greater Good"
2010	Doctor Who	Ambrose Northover	Episodes: "The Hungry Earth", "Cold Blood"
2010	Pen Talar	Judith	Episodes: "1.7", "1.8"
2012	Pianissimo	Mam	TV film
2013	Playhouse Presents	Eleanor	Episode: "Gifted"
2013	Hinterland	Gwen Thomas	Episode: "1.4"
2014	Under Milk Wood	Rosie Probert	TV film
2015	35 Diwrnod	Claire	TV series
2016	Doctors	Abigail Price	Episode: "Eidolon"
2016	Rillington Place	Violet	Episode: "Tim"
2017	The White Princess	Kate Woodville	Episode: "Traitors"
2017–2020	Bang	Linda Murray	Main role
2017	Keeping Faith	Saran James	Episodes: "1.2", "1.4"
2018–2021	Hidden	Elin Jones	TV miniseries
2018	To Provide All People	Midwife	TV film
2019	The Crown	Silvia Millward	Episode: "Tywysog Cymru"
2020	Washington (miniseries)	Martha Washington	TV miniseries
2023	Steeltown Murders	Karina Bethell	TV series
2023	Y Pren Ar Y Bryn	Margaret	TV series
2021	Yr Amgueddfa	Della Howells	TV series
2024	Tree on a Hill	Hidden	TV series

=== Video games ===
Year	Title	Role	Notes
2022	Elden Ring	Dominula dancers	Voice
