= Piers Wenger =

British television executive

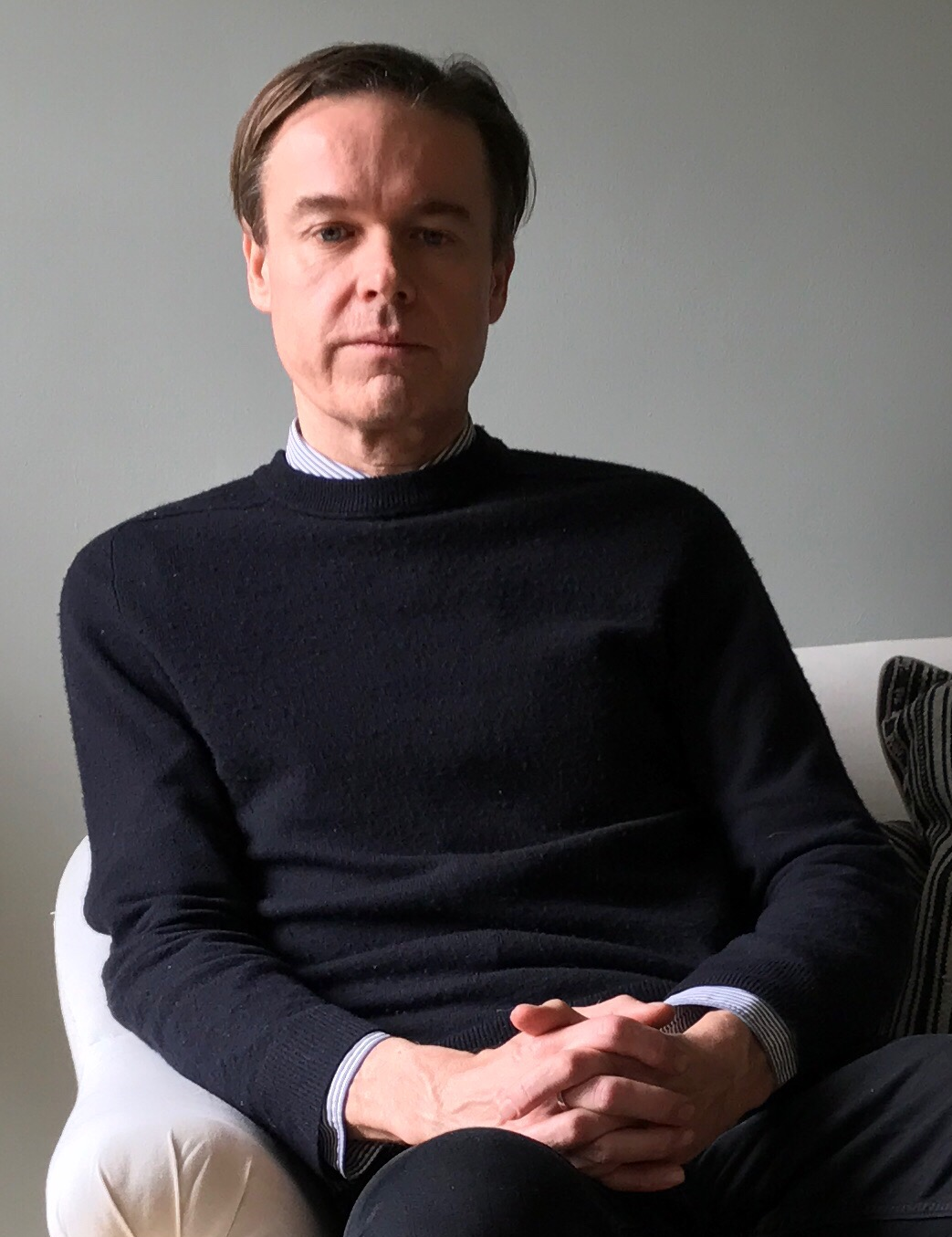
Piers Wenger

Piers Wenger is a British television executive who has served as controller of BBC drama commissioning since 2016.

== Early life ==
Wenger was born Piers John Wenger in Stoke-on-Trent, Staffordshire, England, on 29 June 1972.

== Career ==
As a producer, Wenger closely collaborated with Victoria Wood over a decade on her dramatic projects. He produced her BAFTA and RTS award-winning dramatization of Nella Last's diary Housewife, 49 (2006) and collaborated with her on Loving Miss Hatto (2012), Wood's dramatization of the life of classical pianist Joyce Hatto. He also co-executive produced Eric and Ernie (2011), Peter Bowker's biopic of the young Morecambe and Wise in which Wood also starred.

Wenger became head of drama at BBC Wales and an executive producer on Doctor Who. In his first stint at the BBC, he was responsible for commissioning Kevin Elyot's dramatization of the life of Christopher Isherwood, Christopher and His Kind (2011), and Tom Stoppard's Parade's End (2012).

Wenger spent four years as head of drama at Channel 4. In his time there, he managed a number of popular dramas. In February 2015, Indian Summers, a period drama chronicling the last years of British imperial rule in India, launched and recorded the highest overnight drama audience for a Channel 4 drama in 20 years. No Offence, Paul Abbott's anarchic police procedural, launched strongly later in the same year and won the Royal Television Society Award for best drama series. Another success was Humans, Sam Vincent and Jonathan Brackley's sci-fi series, a co-production with AMC.

Wenger returned to the BBC to be appointed as controller of drama commissioning in 2016. In 2021, Wenger confirmed that he had reluctantly backed a decision to discontinue the long-running hospital drama Holby City in favour of the return of Waterloo Road, the latter representing the north of England.

== Credits ==
Producer

- Housewife, 49 (2006)
- Ballet Shoes (2007)

Executive Producer

- The Sarah Jane Adventures (2009)
- Doctor Who (2010–2011)
- Upstairs, Downstairs (2010)
- Eric and Ernie (2011)

Media offices
Preceded by Julie Gardner	BBC Wales Head of Drama; 2009–2011	Succeeded by Faith Penhale
