= Ryan Hendrick =

Scottish film director

- Born: Ryan Gerard Hendrick; 1984 (age 41–42); Glasgow, Scotland
- Occupations: Director, producer, actor
- Years active: 2005–present
- Website: www.ryanhendrick.co.uk

Ryan Gerard Hendrick is a Scottish filmmaker, director and actor. His works include Perfect Strangers, Sundown and Choices, the last of which he was nominated for a Bafta Scotland New Talent award.

== Early life ==
Born in Glasgow, Hendrick took an Acting & Performance course at Stow College. He then enrolled on an Acting for Camera course taught by industry professionals such as Robert Carlyle and Scottish casting director Kahleen Crawford.

== Career ==
Hendrick wrote his first short film in 2010, entitled Choices, which was nominated for a BAFTA award. After appearing as The Doctor in the Doctor Who fan film Besieged in 2013, Hendrick wrote another short film, named Perfect Strangers in 2015. It was screened at the Cannes Film Festival in 2015 and at 20 other film festivals around the world. This also went on to receive a BAFTA Nomination in 2016. In 2017 Hendrick partnered with cinematographer John Rhodes on the short film Sundown, a drama starring Frazer Hines and Caitlin Blackwood. Sundown premiered at the HollyShorts Film Festival in Los Angeles and went on to be selected for over 20 film festivals. The film won awards for Direction, Drama, Music Score and Best of the Fest.

Hendrick is currently working on the post production of a feature film version of his award winning short film Perfect Strangers, which is due for release at Christmas 2020. It stars Kenny Boyle, Sylvester McCoy, Frazer Hines, Sanjeev Kohli and Clare Grogan.
