= Little Voice =

Little Voice or The Little Voice may refer to:

== Books ==
- The Little Voice, novel by Joss Sheldon 2016
- The Little Voice, story by Ramsey Campbell in the anthology Shadows
- The Little Voice, school paper of Colegio del Sagrado Corazon de Jesus

== Theatre and film ==
- The Rise and Fall of Little Voice, a 1992 play by Jim Cartwright
- Little Voice (film), a 1998 UK film starring Jane Horrocks, based on the 1992 play
- Little Voices (film), a 2011 Welsh student film on a separate storyline

== Music ==
- Little Voice, performer of the closing theme for the Japanese anime series Gear Fighter Dendoh
- Little Voice (album), a 2007 album by Sara Bareilles
- "Little Voice", a 2006 song by Vixen from the album Live & Learn
- "The Little Voice", a 2000 song by Sahlene and covered by Hilary Duff

== Other ==
- Little Voice (TV series), a 2020 romantic comedy television series

== See also ==
- Internal monologue
