= Sir Yellow =

- Genre: Comedy
- Created by: Johnny Heyward
- Starring: Jimmy Edwards; Melvyn Hayes; Alan Curtis; Michael Ripper
- Country of origin: United Kingdom
- Original language: English
- No. of series: 1
- No. of episodes: 6

Production
- Production company: Yorkshire Television

Original release
- Network: ITV
- Release: 15 July – 19 August 1973

Sir Yellow is a British television sitcom aired on ITV from 15 July to 19 August 1973. It starred Jimmy Edwards in the title role, and also featured Melvyn Hayes, Alan Curtis, and Michael Ripper. The show was set in the 13th century and followed the misadventures of a cowardly, womanising, alcoholic knight. The programme was axed after just one series following bad reviews and was never brought back for a second; in 2003 the TV critic Mark Lewisohn named it "the worst British sitcom of all time" in his book The Radio Times Guide to TV Comedy.

== Cast ==
- Jimmy Edwards as Sir Yellow
- Melvyn Hayes as Gregory
- Michael Ripper as Cedric
- Alan Curtis as Sir Griswold

== Episodes ==
- A Knight To Remember – 15 July 1973
- Getting Ye Treatment – 22 July 1973
- Ye Turn of Ye Worm – 29 July 1973
- Love All – 5 August 1973
- I'll Tag Along With Thee – 12 August 1973
- That's Ye Spirit – 19 August 1973
