= Smuggler's Bay =

- Genre: Adventure
- Based on: Moonfleet by J. Meade Falkner
- Directed by: Christopher Barry
- Starring: Frazer Hines
- Country of origin: United Kingdom
- Original language: English
- No. of series: 1
- No. of episodes: 6 (all missing)

Production
- Producer: Campbell Logan
- Running time: 30 minutes
- Production company: BBC

Original release
- Network: BBC One
- Release: 12 July – 16 August 1964

Smuggler's Bay is a British period television drama series which aired on BBC One in 6 episodes in 1964. It is an adaptation of the 1898 adventure novel Moonfleet by J. Meade Falkner. No recordings of this production are known to exist. According to star Frazer Hines, the title was changed due to a perceived conflict with contemporaneous BBC series Moonstrike made by the same department.

== Main cast ==
- Frazer Hines as John Trenchard
- John Phillips as Elzevir Block
- Suzanne Neve as Grace Maskew
- Robert Brown as Sam Tewkesbury
- Patrick Troughton as Ratsey
- Robert James as Mr. Glennie
- Alan Haywood as Tom Farley
- Brian Jackson as Ben Field
- Paul Curran as Magistrate Maskew
- Nancy Nevinson as Mrs. Belmore
- Margot Lister as Granny Tucker
- Henry Oscar as Aldobrand
- John Dawson as Johannes
- Jean Anderson as Aunt Jane
- Elizabeth Zinn as Rose Aldobrand
- James Langley as Tom Tully
- Alf Edwards as Ned
- Charles Hodgson as Captain Hennig
