= Meet the Magoons =

- Genre: Sitcom
- Written by: Hardeep Singh Kohli
- Directed by: Hardeep Singh Kohli
- Starring: Hardeep Singh Kohli; Nitin Ganatra; Paul Sharma; Sanjeev Kohli; Vincent Ebrahim
- Country of origin: United Kingdom
- Original language: English
- No. of series: 1
- No. of episodes: 6

Production
- Executive producer: Eileen Quinn
- Producer: Sally Martin
- Production company: IWC Media

Original release
- Network: Channel 4
- Release: 19 August – 23 September 2005

Meet the Magoons is a six-part comedy television series in the United Kingdom aired on Channel 4 in 2005, directed by and starring Hardeep Singh Kohli. The main characters are a Punjabi family who live in Glasgow, and own an Indian restaurant called "The Spice".

It received mixed reviews. A. A. Gill hoped it "might well evolve into something classic" and Nancy Banks-Smith of The Guardian called it "modern to the point of surreal". A second series was not commissioned.

== Cast ==
- Hardeep Singh Kohli - Hamish
- Nitin Ganatra - Nitin
- Paul Sharma - Paul
- Sanjeev Kohli - Surjit
- Vincent Ebrahim - Nitin's dad
