= Timothy Walker (actor) =

British film and television actor

Timothy Walker is a British film and television actor.

His most notable role was as Angus, the groom at the first wedding, in the 1994 film Four Weddings and a Funeral. He has also appeared in Nuremberg: Nazis on Trial, Looking for Victoria, Peak Practice, Monsignor Renard, Pie in the Sky and Doctor Who.

== Filmography ==
| Year | Title | Role | Notes |
|---|---|---|---|
| 1994 | Four Weddings and a Funeral | Angus, the Groom - Wedding One | |
| 2001 | Crush | Mr Bundesbank | |
| 2003 | The Gospel of John | Man in Crowd #2 | |
| 2007 | Hannibal Rising | SS Major | |
| 2012 | Bel Ami | Solicitor | |
