= Looking for Victoria =

2003 television docudrama about Queen Victoria

Looking for Victoria is a two-hour television docudrama on the life of Queen Victoria, presented by Prunella Scales and showing Scales' research for her one-woman show An Evening with Queen Victoria. Shown on BBC One in 2003, and available on BBC iPlayer, as two 56-minute programmes, it was directed by Louise Osmond and narrated by Geoffrey Palmer, while its cast includes Charlie Hayes as the young Victoria, Tom Allen as the young Prince Albert, Andrew Sachs as Benjamin Disraeli, Timothy West as Thomas Creevey, Timothy Walker as Wilfred Scawen Blunt, Richenda Carey as Lady Wharnecliffe, David Ryall as Henry James, Charles Dance as Charles Greville and Geoffrey Bayldon as Henry Ponsonby. Filming locations included Royal Glen Hotel in Sidmouth.
