= Kenny Boyle =

Scottish actor, playwright and novelist

- Born: Coinneach Iain Boyle; 13 May 1984 (age 42); Stornoway, Isle of Lewis, Scotland
- Education: Royal Conservatoire of Scotland
- Occupations: Actor, playwright, novelist
- Years active: 2010–present
- Known for: Star of Lost at Christmas (2020)
- Notable work: Knock of The Ban-Sìthe (BBC Radio 4 drama) An Isolated Incident (play), The Tick and the Tock of the Crocodile Clock (novel)

Coinneach Iain "Kenny" Boyle (born 13 May 1984) is a Scottish actor, playwright and novelist.

== Education ==
Kenny Boyle was born in Stornoway, on the Isle of Lewis. He grew up in Cromore. He holds a Masters in Classical and Contemporary Text from Royal Conservatoire of Scotland. He also holds an undergraduate degree in English Literature and Theatre Studies from the University of Strathclyde.

== Actor ==
He was co-lead, alongside Natalie Clark, of Ryan Hendrick's multi-award winning film short Perfect Strangers (2015) and in Hendrick's feature length version Lost at Christmas (2020). He appears as Detective Marvin Starke in BBC Scotland comedy sitcom Scot Squad (2022). He plays An Dotair in BBC Alba drama An t-Eilean (2025).

== Playwright ==
His plays include Eerie Isles, Playthrough, and An Isolated Incident, and, in 2021, he received a New Playwrights Award from the Playwrights’ Studio, Scotland. In 2021 he was longlisted in the Scottish Emerging Theatre Awards in their The Flourish Award, The New Writing Award, The Digital Award, and Artist of The Year categories. His debut radio play Knock of The Ban-Sithe was broadcast on BBC Radio 4 in August 2022 and was BBC Sounds drama of the week. For writing "Knock of The Ban-Sithe," he was a finalist for BBC Audio Drama's 2023 Imison Award, and shortlisted for the Celtic Media Festival’s award for Drama (Sound) on 17 March 2023

== Novelist ==
His debut novel The Tick and the Tock of the Crocodile Clock, about an aspiring writer from the Southside of Glasgow, was published by Lightning Books in May 2022. Inspired by Peter Pan and written during the COVID-19 pandemic after Boyle was diagnosed with anxiety and depression, he said 'The book is about not wanting to grow up into what society hopes for adults to be and having that conflict of interest between your younger self and the adult you’re growing up to be.' After the story went viral, In February 2022 he found the primary school teacher who, twenty six years before, he had promised he would send his first book to when it was published. In July 2023, the book was a finalist in the Book Bloggers' Novel of The Year Award. In April 2026 it was announced that Boyle would be writing a trilogy of folk horror fiction books published by Hodder & Stoughton, with the first of this trilogy, Shadows Of The Burning Moor, to be released on the 1st of July 2027.

== Other ==
Owing to his work in bringing Scottish culture and folklore to a worldwide audience through his social media accounts, in 2025 he was named "Most Influential Scot, 2025" On the 3rd of May 2026 he was named Scottish Influencer of The Year in the Arts and Culture category of the Scottish Influencer Awards. On the 4th of May 2026, having raised more than £10,000 for Macmillan Cancer Support he was named the official race starter for the Edinburgh Marathon and Edinburgh Half Marathon.

== Private life ==
He is married to wife Claire.
