= Lost at Christmas =

2020 film directed by Ryan Hendrick

- Directed by: Ryan Hendrick
- Written by: Ryan Hendrick; Clare Sheppard
- Produced by: David Newman
- Starring: Kenny Boyle; Natalie Clark; Sylvester McCoy; Frazer Hines; Clare Grogan; Sanjeev Kohli; Caitlin Blackwood
- Cinematography: John Rhodes
- Music by: Stephen Wright
- Production company: Magic Monkey Films
- Release date: 7 December 2020
- Country: United Kingdom
- Language: English

Lost at Christmas is a 2020 Scottish romantic comedy film. It is written and directed by Ryan Hendrick and stars Kenny Boyle, Natalie Clark, Sylvester McCoy, Sanjeev Kohli, Clare Grogan and Frazer Hines.

== Plot ==
Two strangers stranded in the Scottish Highlands on Christmas Eve team up to try and get home in time for Christmas.

== Cast ==
- Kenny Boyle as Rob
- Natalie Clark as Jen
- Sylvester McCoy as Ernie
- Sanjeev Kohli as Sid
- Clare Grogan as Anna
- Frazer Hines as Frank
- Caitlin Blackwood as Clara
- Karen Bartke as Ellen
- Alasdair McCrone as James
- Alexander Teunion as Chris
- Nicolette McKeown as Nicki
- Simon Laidlaw as the taxi driver
- David Bickerstaff as German Wine Seller

== Production ==
Originally titled Perfect Strangers, the film is based on Ryan Hendrick's 2015 short film of the same name. Production on Lost at Christmas began in September 2019. In June 2020, the film entered its final stages of production, ready for its release at Christmas 2020. The film also appeared in a special BBC News report in January 2020 while filming was taking place, including interviews with members of the cast and production crew. The film was renamed from Perfect Strangers to Lost at Christmas during post-production in October 2020.

=== Casting ===
The full cast list was revealed on 20 November 2019, that consisted of Kenny Boyle, Natalie Clark, Sylvester McCoy, Sanjeev Kohli, Clare Grogan, Frazer Hines, Caitlin Blackwood, Karen Bartke, Alasdair McCrone, Alexander Teunion and Nicolette McKeown with additional cast members being announced on 28 December.

=== Filming ===
Filming took place January 2020 around Fort William and Glencoe and was completed in twelve days. Filming was officially completed on 19 January 2020.

== Release ==
The film had its premiere on 26 November 2020 at the Highland Cinema in Fort William. It was released in cinemas on 4 December 2020 and via the internet on 7 December 2020.

== Reception ==
Writing in The Guardian, Leslie Felperin gave the film two stars, describing it as a "dully sentimental, unfunny romantic comedy".

== See also ==
- List of Christmas films
