= Caitlin Blackwood =

Northern Irish-Scottish actress (born 2000)

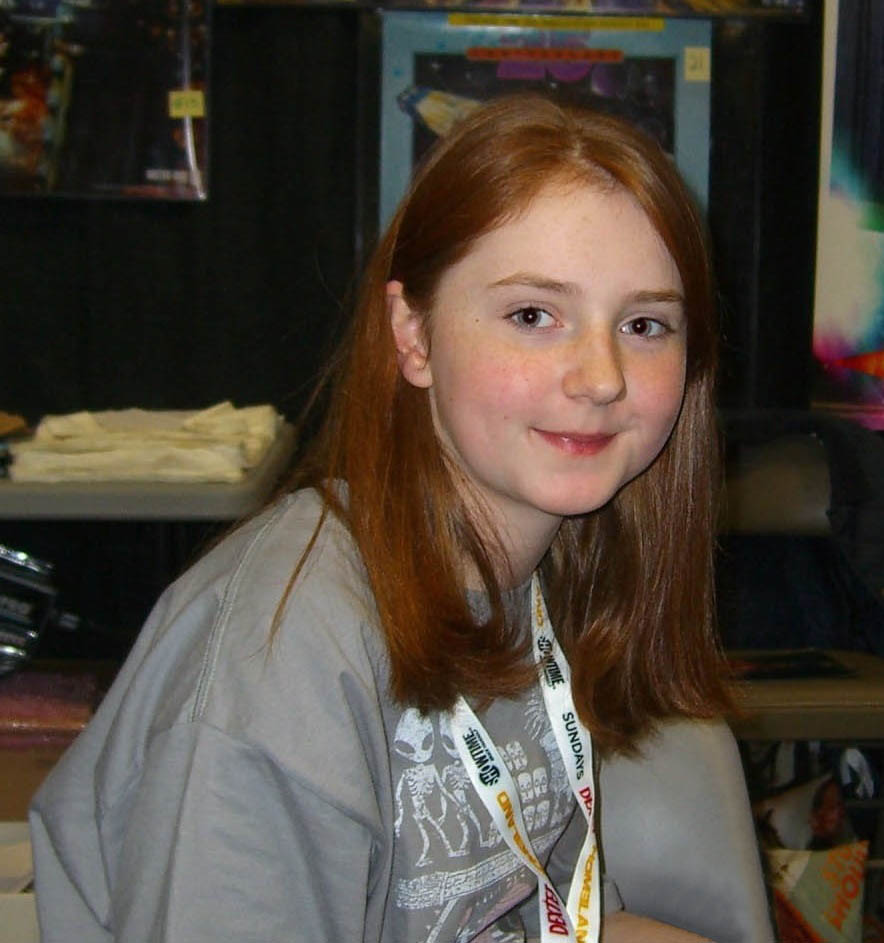
- Blackwood in 2012
- Born: 23 June 2000 (age 26); Antrim, Northern Ireland
- Occupation: Actress
- Years active: 2010–present
- Relatives: Karen Gillan (cousin)

Caitlin Blackwood (born 23 June 2000) is a Northern Irish-born Scottish actress. She is best known for playing the young Amy Pond in the BBC One TV programme Doctor Who.

== Biography ==
Blackwood was born in Antrim, Northern Ireland in 2000. She moved with her family to Inverness, Scotland when she was six years old and has lived there ever since.

Blackwood played Alexis in the 2015 episode "Preparing the Weapon" of the crowdfunded TV series Cops and Monsters. In 2018 she appeared in a short film called Sundown directed by Ryan Hendrick.

She played the young Amelia Pond in several Doctor Who episodes; "The Eleventh Hour", "The Big Bang", "Let's Kill Hitler", and "The God Complex", with footage of her briefly reused in "The Angels Take Manhattan". She is the cousin of Karen Gillan, who portrayed the adult Amy Pond, although they had never met before Blackwood was cast. Resemblance to Gillan was a factor in her casting. In 2018, she starred in Sundown, an award-winning short film by Ryan Hendrick. In 2020, she played Amy Pond in the Doctor Who short: "The Raggedy Doctor by Amelia Pond".

In 2020, she appeared in the romantic comedy film Lost at Christmas, which also featured Doctor Who actors Sylvester McCoy and Frazer Hines.

== Filmography ==
=== Film ===
| Year | Title | Role | Notes | Ref(s) |
|---|---|---|---|---|
| 2018 | Sundown | Abi | | |
| 2019 | Get Duked! | Schoolgirl | | |
| 2020 | Lost at Christmas | Clara | | |

=== Television ===
| Year | Title | Role | Notes | Ref(s) |
|---|---|---|---|---|
| 2010–2011 | Doctor Who | Amelia Pond | 4 episodes (1 special) | |
| 2015 | Cops and Monsters | Alexis | Episode: "Preparing the Weapon" | |
