= Charlie Hayes (actress) =

British actress (born 1977)

- Born: Charlotte Amy Hayes; 1977 (age 48–49); Hammersmith, Greater London, England
- Occupation: Actor
- Parents: Melvyn Hayes (father); Wendy Padbury (mother)

Charlotte Amy Hayes (born 1977) is a British actress in TV, film and audio. She is the daughter of Wendy Padbury and Melvyn Hayes.

She has appeared in several Doctor Who audio dramas, including Master (2003) and Annihilation (2011). In one of them, the 2008 audio adaptation of the stage play Seven Keys to Doomsday, she played Jenny, a part originally played by her mother, whilst she also appeared alongside her mother in The Memory Cheats (2011), The Uncertainty Principle (2012), and Lords of the Red Planet (2013).

She has also appeared as the recurring characters Ruth Wycliffe in Wycliffe (1996–1998) and Kate in Crossroads (2003). Other appearances include Looking for Victoria (2003) and Jack and the Cuckoo-Clock Heart (2013).

Hayes works as a voice artist for animation, radio adverts and audio books.
