= The Silver Sword (1957 TV series) =

1957 British children's TV series

- Based on: The Silver Sword by Ian Serraillier
- Written by: C.E. Webber
- Starring: Pat Pleasance; Melvyn Hayes; Ingrid Sylvester; Frazer Hines
- Country of origin: United Kingdom
- Original language: English
- No. of series: 1
- No. of episodes: 7

Production
- Running time: 25 minutes

Original release
- Network: BBC Television Service
- Release: 24 November 1957 – 5 January 1958

The Silver Sword is a 1957 British children's television series based on the 1956 children's novel The Silver Sword by Ian Serrailler. The series was adapted for television by C.E. Webber and starred Melvyn Hayes, then aged 22 and Frazer Hines, then aged 13.

== Story ==
Set in Nazi occupied Poland, the Balikis family consisting of the father, Joseph, the mother, Margrit and their 3 children, Ruth, Edek and Bronia are torn apart when the parents are arrested and sent to a Concentration Camp. Now forced to fend for themselves when their house is burned by the Germans, the children soon leave the city for the countryside unaware that Joseph has escaped. After returning to the ruins of his home, he discovers his wife's letter opener in the shape of a silver sword and encounters a street orphan named Jan. Joseph gives Jan the silver sword in exchange for him to tell his children (If Jan finds them) that the family will reunite in Switzerland.

== Cast ==
- Pat Pleasance as Ruth Balicki
- Melvyn Hayes as Edek Balicki
- Ingrid Sylvester as Bronia Balicki
- Barry Letts as Joseph Balicki
- Gwen Watford as Magrit Balicki
- Frazer Hines as Jan

== Production ==
Due to budget limitations, the series was entirely studio bond and could not depict the children crossing the lake into Switzerland and instead had a witness recall the events.

== Episodes ==
No.	Title	Written by	Original release date
1	"The Escape from the Nazis"	C.E. Webber	November 24, 1957
2	"Escape from Prison"	C.E. Webber	December 1, 1957
3	"The Burning of the City"	C.E. Webber	December 8, 1957
4	"The Return of Edek"	C.E. Webber	December 15, 1957
5	"Jan in Trouble"	C.E. Webber	December 22, 1957
6	"Escape from Bavaria"	C.E. Webber	December 29, 1957
7	"The Last Lap"	C.E. Webber	January 5, 1958

== Archive status ==
Unlike most BBC shows from the 1950s, all 7 episodes of The Silver Sword have survived but the series has not been released on home media.

== After The Silver Sword ==
C.E Webber would co-create Doctor Who which would feature Frazer Hines as Jamie McCrimmon between 1966 to 1969 along with guest appearances in 1983, 1985 and 2023. Barry letts would also work on Doctor Who, serving as producer from 1969 to 1974. Melvyn Hayes would appear in the sitcom It Ain't Half Hot Mum as Gunner (later Bombardier) "Gloria" Beaumont.

== Other adaptions ==
The BBC adapted The Silver Sword a second time in 1971 that ran for 8 episodes. This adaption has never been released on home media but all episodes are available on YouTube here. In 2011, BBC Radio 4 Extra produced a radio adaptation of the novel.

== External Link ==
- The Silver Sword at IMDb
