= Melvyn Hayes =

English actor (born 1935)

- Born: Melvyn Hyams; 11 January 1935 (age 91); Wandsworth, London, England
- Occupations: Actor, voice artist
- Years active: 1950–present
- Television: Quatermass II (1955); The Curse of Frankenstein (1957); It Ain't Half Hot Mum (1974–1981); SuperTed (1983–1986); The Further Adventures of SuperTed (1989); EastEnders (2005); Drop the Dead Donkey (1998); Benidorm (2011)
- Spouse(s): Rosalind Allen (m. 1962, divorced) Wendy Padbury (m. 1974; div. 1987) Jayne Male (m. 1992; died 2022)
- Children: 6, including Charlie Hayes
- Website: http://melvynhayes.com/

Melvyn Hayes (né Hyams; born 11 January 1935) is an English actor and voice-over performer with a career spanning more than seven and a half decades. Performing in films, television shows and on stage, Hayes frequently portrayed camp-styled characters.

Hayes' professional career began on stage before transitioning to film and television in the late 1950s. He was a recurring actor in films starring pop musician Cliff Richard such as The Young Ones (1961), Summer Holiday (1963) and Wonderful Life (1964). He had a recurring role in the film series The Magnificent Six and 1/2 in the late 1960s and its subsequent series, the short lived sitcom Here Come the Double Deckers! in 1971.

Hayes appeared as the camp character Gunner (later Bombardier) "Gloria" Beaumont in the television comedy It Ain't Half Hot Mum, from 1974 to 1981. After the show ended, he moved to voice acting, and had a role in the children's animated show SuperTed as the villain Skeleton from 1983 to 1986, and in its short reboot show, The Further Adventures of SuperTed in 1989.

Hayes has more recently appeared as himself in entertainment shows such as The Alan Titchmarsh Show and Would I Lie to You?, and has made occasional performances as a one-off character in shows Benidorm and Not Going Out.

He is the father to actress Charlie Hayes, who was born while Hayes was married to actress Wendy Padbury.

== Early life and education ==
Born on 11 January 1935 in Wandsworth, South London as Melvyn Hyams, he was the third of four children to Jewish parents Isaac and Queenie Hyams, of Dutch and Polish ancestry. His father worked at a fairground before opening a suit shop in Wandsworth, which the family lived above. His mother was a housewife who sang in working men's clubs. As antisemitism was common at the time, his parents went under the names Peter and Sarah.

When he was four, he was evacuated to Dawlish, Devon during the Second World War with two of his brothers. They lived with many other children in a house owned by a woman called Mrs. Cobham; during Hayes' stay at the house, one boy died of pneumonia and another was beaten for wetting the bed. Eventually, their mother came and took the boys and moved back to London. They lived in Devon until 1944, when they moved to Clapham, where they remained until the war ended. In the winter of 1944, Hayes' brother Colin was wounded by an explosion near their Clapham flat.

His first experience with acting came in primary school when he played the Gingerbread Man in a school play. After passing his 11 plus exam, Hayes attended Sir Walter St John's Grammar School For Boys, in Battersea, where he was bullied because of his height and his Jewish background. While there, he was in the schools Chess and Boxing clubs.

His inspiration to work in show business came in 1946, when at age 11 he saw The Jolson Story. He sent a letter to Columbia Pictures asking for an autograph from Al Jolson, which he received after a few weeks; Hayes kept the autograph and regarded it as his "most prized possession".

He left Sir Walter St John's Grammar School in 1949 and was unsure on what to do with his life. Because of his short stature, some suggested he be a jockey. Hayes sent a letter to Princess Elizabeth asking if he could be an apprentice at the royal stables; Elizabeth was on holiday in Malta but wished him the best on his journey. Hayes got a job at a local stables, but quit the job after a fortnight because he did not like the experience. He got a job at News Chronicle in Fleet Street, carrying advertising print blocks between newspapers.

== Career ==
=== 1950s and 1960s ===
In 1950, Hayes saw an advertisement seeking an assistant for the conjurer The Great Massoni. He got the job and was soon "disappearing twice daily for £4 per week" performing the Indian rope trick in Maskelyne's Mysteries at The Comedy Theatre in London. He was also in a theatrical troupe called Terry's Juveniles and later appeared in repertory theatres in Surrey, Derbyshire and the Midlands. Hayes revealed many years later that on the day of his audition, when he met the troupe leader Theresa Freedman, aka Miss Terry, she said to him: "'Can you sing?' No. 'Can you dance?' No. 'Are you Jewish?' Yes. 'You got the part.' " It was around this time when Melvyn changed his surname from "Hyams" to "Hayes" in order to sound "less Jewish".

He played Tommy at the Westminster Theatre between 15 May and 14 June 1952. He returned to the Comedy Theatre in October 1952, playing Tommie, opposite Florence Desmond, Anthony Ireland and Geoffrey Kerr, in The Apples of Eve. In 1955, he was in three theatre productions: The Desperate Hours, South and Edward's Son, as Jimmy. His last stage role of the 1950s was in Telescope, performed at the Salisbury Playhouse, as Joe Palmer.

Hayes slowly began his move to film and television in the late 1950s. One of his earliest televised roles was in the BBC Billy Bunter of Greyfriars School. He played Edek in The Silver Sword in 1957, a children's television serial about Polish refugees trying to find their father after World War II. His early film roles include the young Victor Frankenstein in The Curse of Frankenstein (1957), Willem in Operation Amsterdam (1959) and Cecil Biggs in Bottoms Up (1960). During a screening of The Curse of Frankenstein, he experienced his first dose of homophobia as a result of his effeminate role, a type of character Hayes would play on many occasions throughout his career.

Throughout a seven-year span (1958–1965) Hayes reappeared four times on the police drama series Dixon of Dock Green portraying various minor characters: Larkin in series 4 episode 25 "Little Boy Blue" in 1958, Mick in series 5 episode 20 "Blue in the Night" in 1959, Dave "Cha-Cha" Charlton in series 7 episode 16 "The Burn-Up" in 1961, and finally as Atkins in series 11 episode 24 "The Inside Man" in 1965. However, none of these episodes remain the BBC archive, presumed to have been wiped.

In 1959, Hayes guest appeared on an episode of This is Your Life dedicated to Ted Willis. Hayes would appear on the show another fifteen times over the course of 43 years, in episodes for Richard O'Sullivan (1974), Michael Bates (1974), Windsor Davies (1976), Richard Goolden (1978), Michael Aspel (1980), his own episode (1981), Peter Adamson (1981), Catherine Cookson (1982), Jim Davidson (1984), Paul Henry (1985), Gretchen Franklin (1995), David Croft (1995), George Layton (1999), Linda Lusardi (2000) and Ian Lavender (2002).

On 1 May 1960, he performed in the one-time stage show Change for the Angel at the Arts Theatre. In 1961 he was on stage in The Fantastiks and Why the Chicken, and on 10 November 1962 began portraying Wilfred Compton in Spring and Port Wine, which would run at the Mermaid and Apollo Theatre for the next years, performing its last show on 12 October 1968.

In the mid-1960s, Hayes had recurring roles in films starring pop musician Cliff Richard; these include as Jimmy in The Young Ones (1961) Cyril in Summer Holiday (1963) and 'Brother' Willy in Crooks in Cloisters (1964). Hayes has mentioned many times, including on an episode of Would I Lie to You?, that filming was terrifying as he and Richard were only taught how to drive a double-decker bus half an hour before filming: "Coming round bends on the cliffs of Greece, I remember driving this big bus round a bend, first day of shooting, and wondering what the insurance would cost, with Cliff, The Shadows and Una Stubbs in the seats behind me. I was heading for the cameras, as I knew we wouldn't go over the edge that way, they told me if they waved their right arms, I was too near the wall, and if they waved their left, I was too close to the edge".

Hayes appeared in an episode of the drama The Human Jungle starring Herbert Lom in 1963. A day after Hayes' last performance of Spring and Port Wine, he debuted in the show Staring at the Sun as Tom, on 13 October 1968 which lasted for another seventeen days. In December 1968, he was in Toad in Toad Hall at the Duke of York's Theatre.

=== 1970s and 1980s ===
In 1971 he performed at the Thorndike Theatre as a part of the show Ballad of the Sad Cafe. In 1974, he toured South Africa in the stage show Habeus Corpus. By 1973, Hayes was teaching drama at the Italia Conti Academy of Theatre Arts, during which he taught Tracey Ullman, Lesley Manville and Leslie Ash.

Hayes' biggest role came in the sitcom It Ain't Half Hot Mum (1974–1981) as Gunner "Gloria" Beaumont. He played the flamboyantly camp character Gloria Beaumont. For the first two series, the character held the rank of gunner, but after character Gunner Solomon left, he was promoted to bombardier. Hayes appeared in all 56 episodes of the comedy show, from 1974 to 1981. He has openly criticised the BBC on many occasions over the years for refusing to repeat episodes of the show due to some of its dated language, and because Caucasian actor Michael Bates applied brown tan and an Asian accent to play the Indian character Bearer Rangi Ram. Hayes said to The Telegraph in 2014: "It was one of the most popular shows on television and I don't understand the decision. Now, people can swear on television—which we never did—and you're seemingly allowed to tell any homophobic joke you want, et cetera. Yet because Windsor Davies's character called us a "bunch of poofs" and Michael Bates, who was born in India, dressed up as an Indian, the BBC won't repeat it."

During his time on the IAHHM, Hayes also appeared in Carry On England, Love Thy Neighbour and The Thin Blue Line. He was also on the show Potter's Picture Palace on two occasions (1976 and 1978). Between March and June 1979 he was in a production of Play It Again, Sam as Allan Felix at The Playhouse, Weston-super-Mare.

In 1980, he and IAHHM co-star Windsor Davies starred in the production Sink of Slim, in which he played Albert, which ran at the Shanklin Theatre and Marlowe Theatre from April to November.

Hayes was the subject of an episode of This Is Your Life that aired on 28 January 1981. He was surprised by Eamonn Andrews during the curtain call of the pantomime show Dick Whittington at the London Palladium on 7 January. Richard O'Sullivan, Edward Woodward and Alfred Marks all guest appeared to pay tribute to Hayes.

After It Ain't Half Hot Mum was cancelled in 1981, Hayes appeared with most of the cast in a year long stage show of the serires from 1982 to 1983, hosted at the Bristol Hippodrome. In 1983/1984, he was in Run for Your Wife. Afterwards, he started appearing on many popular talk and game shows as himself.

Hayes found a new career path as a voice actor in the 1980s, and shifted his career toward that. He mainly voiced characters on children's cartoons, most notably in SuperTed as the "flamboyantly gay" villain Skeleton from 1983 to 1986 and its revived show The Further Adventures of SuperTed in 1989.

Hayes played the Mole in a production of The Wind in the Willows from November 1984 to February 1985. In 1988, he was a part of the shows In One Bed... Out the Other and Who Goes Bare? as Maurice and Eddie, respectively.

=== 1990s ===
Hayes provided his voice for roles in The Dreamstone, Little Dracula, Alfred J. Kwak, Pongwiffy and Budgie the Little Helicopter. He also provided the voice of characters in the English translation of the cartoon Alfred J. Kwak. In November to December 1993, he was at the Redgrave Theatre, Farnham as a Caretaker in A Step in Time.

Hayes appeared in the final series of Drop the Dead Donkey in 1998.

=== 2000s ===
From 2000 to 2006, he was a guest in Dictionary Corner on 27 episodes of Countdown. Also in 2000, he was in two new stage shows: The Bespoke Overcoat as Fender in June and July, and Saved by Sex as Maybelline in August.

Adventure in the Hopfields, one of the first films Hayes ever appeared in, was deemed lost until a copy was found in 2002. He attended the film's first screening since the 1950s at an event in Kent.

For eight episodes in May and June 2005, he was in EastEnders as Michael Rawlins, a character introduced for a storyline in which Rawlins, a driving instructor, tries to have his way with Dot Branning. In 2007, Hayes played Uncle George in the stage show Cash on Delivery, which toured the UK from July to November. In 2008, he returned to Run for Your Wife for a few shows in June and July.

=== 2010s ===
In March 2011, Hayes appeared as Mr Pink in the ITV1 comedy TV series Benidorm. He was also in the Doctor Who: The Companion Chronicles audio The Scorchies (2013).

In February 2016, Hayes publicly expressed his disapproval of Dad's Army and "You Can't Teach a New Dog Old Tricks", a one-off revival episode of Are You Being Served?, stating that the BBC should "let old TV series lie" and that David Croft, who co-wrote both series plus It Ain't Half Hot Mum, would have "turned in his grave" as Hayes claimed he was "very disappointed" in the revival film.

Hayes was featured on a celebrity edition of Pointless in 2019, paired up with It Ain't Half Hot Mum co-star Stuart McGugan.

=== 2020s ===
Hayes was a guest speaker at a ceremony celebrating 65 years of Carry On films in June 2023. In August 2023, he appeared in the BBC sitcom Not Going Out. In December 2023, he appeared on a Christmas edition of Would I Lie to You?, and was on Lee Mack's team, with Alex Brooker being the other guest on his panel.

In 2025, Hayes was filming in Wakefield for an upcoming comedy film, Doubles, as Stan, a widowed pensioner. In August 2025, he was a star guest at Comic Con at Weston-super-Mare.

In 1986, Hayes started writing an autobiography, which was finally released in January 2026. Its original title was If You Ain't Got Your Sock, after something his dad used to say to him ("if you ain't got your socks, you can't pull them up"), but he changed the title to It Ain't Half Late Mum, a play on words for It Ain't Half Hot Mum. Hayes held a book launch at Goldsboro Books in London on 22 January.

== Personal life ==
=== Family ===
Hayes has been married three times, and in 2017 had six children, thirteen grandchildren, and two great-grandchildren. He had three children with his first wife, Rosalind Allen.

After they divorced, he married Wendy Padbury in 1974, and had two daughters before divorcing in 1987, including actress Charlie Hayes.

Hayes and his third wife, Jayne Male, wed in 1992, and were married for thirty years before her death from lung cancer on 3 September 2022. They fostered over 50 children and had a child of their own.

Hayes and Jayne moved to the Cotswolds in 1997. He moved to south London in 2022, following Jayne's death, to live with his daughter and her husband.

=== Health ===
Hayes broke his foot in while filming Wonderful Life, which delayed filming for a scene in which the cast dance on a boat.

In 2009, Hayes was diagnosed with coronary heart disease, which at first only gave him indigestion but after a while began to affect his walking, which caused trouble, as he was working on various theatre productions. He had bypass surgery at St Mary's Hospital in Portsmouth.

In 2026, Hayes mentioned he had a personal trainer, who helps him once a week, and he goes to the gym twice a week.

=== Interests ===
Hayes is a member of the Grand Order of Water Rats, having been initiated in 1994, and in 2004 was made King Rat. Also in 2004, to raise money for the Grand Order, Hayes spent £3,000 on a signed photo of pantomime actor Dan Leno. The organisation held a special event in March 2025, for Hayes' 90th birthday, and in May 2025, awarded him two PKR medals.

In 2024, he revealed that he had voted for the Green Party. Hayes was once asked by Screaming Lord Sutch to stand as a candidate for the Official Monster Raving Loony Party.

In 2025, he became a patron of The Music Hall Guild of Great Britain and America.

Hayes and his third wife, Jayne, managed three pubs. He was at one time the pub landlord of the Stag Inn in the village of Offchurch in Warwickshire, the White Hart Tap in St Albans, Hertfordshire, and The Brantham Bull, Brantham, Suffolk from December 1994 to January 1997. When he owned the Brantham Bull, he was regularly in the local newspapers, as he and the Suffolk County Council were in constant disagreement over Hayes writing comical jokes on a blackboard hung outside the pub.

Hayes has cited Bob Monkhouse, Tommy Cooper, Billy Connolly and Lee Mack as some of his favourite comedians. Hayes was approached by Connolly in 1980, who told him he was his "biggest fan".

=== Charity ===
Hayes donates to many charities, including the Royal National Lifeboat Institution, Great Ormond Street Hospital and The Salvation Army. He has supported Barnardo's since the 1990s. In 2006, he and a performing arts charity for children in St Neots, Cambridgeshire, held their own version of the Oscars for the students.

== Filmography ==
=== Film ===
Year	Title	Role	Notes
1950	The Blue Lamp	Blond urchin	(uncredited)
1953	Top of the Form	Schoolboy with glasses	
1953	Adventure in the Hopfields	Ned Reilly	
1954	Face the Music / The Black Glove	Hotel Bellhop	
1955	The Man Who Loved Redheads	Sydney	
1955	The Blue Peter	Nelson watch member	(uncredited)
1956	Fun at St. Fanny's	Heckling boy at concert	(uncredited)
1956	Stars in Your Eyes	Bit part	(uncredited)
1956	Anastasia	Bit part	(uncredited)
1957	The Curse of Frankenstein	Young Victor	
1957	The Good Companions	Telegraph boy	
1957	Woman in a Dressing Gown	Newsboy	
1958	Violent Playground	Kid in Johnnie's gang	(uncredited)
1959	Operation Amsterdam	Willem	
1959	No Trees in the Street	Tommy	
1960	The Flesh and the Fiends	Daft Jamie	
1960	Bottoms Up	Cecil Biggs	
1961	The Young Ones	Jimmy	
1962	The Silent Invasion	Jean	
1963	Summer Holiday	Cyril	
1964	Crooks in Cloisters	Willy	
1964	Wonderful Life	Jerry	
1969	A Walk with Love and Death	First Entertainer	
1969	The Magnificent Six and 1/2: It's Not Cricket	Silly workman	
1969	The Magnificent Six and 1/2: Peewee Had a Little Ape	Clown	
1971	The Magnificent Seven Deadly Sins	Porter	Credited as "Melvin"
1971	Bachelor of Arts	Mr. Jenkins	
1971	A Christmas Carol	Bob Cratchit	Voice
1972	Go for a Take	Ambulance Man	
1973	Love Thy Neighbour	Terry	
1974	Man About the House	Nigel	
1976	Carry On England	Gunner Shorthouse	
1978	What's Up Superdoc!	Waiter / Pietro	
1979	A Touch of the Sun	Ginger Rogers	
1984	The Zany Adventures of Robin Hood	Father Luther	
1985	Santa Claus: The Movie	Goober the elf	
1990	King of the Wind	Twicker	
1999	Jack and the Beanstalk	Ambrose	Voice
2014	Shiner	The Limpet	Short film
2018	T. I. M: This Is Me	Myrtle	
2022	Absalom: Fight Night!	Harr Absalom	
2025	Doubles	Stan	

=== Television ===
==== 1950s ====
Year	Title	Role	Notes
1953–1960	Sunday-night Theatre	Various	Four episodes
1953	Face the Music	Page boy	One episode
1955	Quatermass II	Frankie	One episode
1955	The Explorer	Dai Davies	One episode
1955	The Unloved	Actor	Television movie
1955	The Magic Idol	Christopher	Television movie
1955	The Running Tide	John	Television movie
1955	The Magic Fishbone	Gherkin	Television movie
1956	No Man's Land	Miro	Television movie
1956	Rex Milligan	Bubblegum Tucker	Six episodes
1956	Extra Item	Barry Green	Television movie
1956	Bill Radford: Reporter	Eddie Knowles	One episode
1956	Tearaway	Syd Shelton	Television movie
1956–1957	Billy Bunter of Greyfriars School	Harold Skinner	Four episodes
1957	Playhouse	Jimmy Tait	One episode
1957	The Wharf Road Mob	Clive	Television movie
1957	Armchair Theatre	Stephen Cantrell	One episode
1957	Overseas Press Club – Exclusive!	Gang member	Uncredited, one episode
1957	The Telescope	Joe Palmer	Television movie
1957–1958	The Silver Sword	Edek	Seven episodes
1958	Television World Theatre	Willi	One episode
1958–1965	Dixon of Dock Green	Various	Four episodes
1958–1959	Our Mutual Friend	Charley Hexam	Four episodes
1959	Jo's Boys	Dan	Five episodes
1959	Probation Officer	Arthur Finney	Two episodes
1959–2002	This Is Your Life	Himself	Sixteen episodes

==== 1960s ====
Year	Title	Role	Notes
1960	Skyport	unknown	One episode
1960	Whack-O!	Terry	One episode
1961	The Bun House Wedding	Youth	Television movie
1961	Faces of Jim	Norman	One episode
1961	Mr. Pastry Hooks a Spook	John Groom	Television movie
1962	Stryker of the Yard	The page boy	One episode
1962	Oliver Twist	Artful Dodger	Five episodes
1963	The Human Jungle	Bert Morgan	One episode
1963	Taxi!	Barry Dobson	One episode
1964	The Chase	Scratch	Television movie
1964	Six	Scratch	One episode
1964	Highlight: The Singing Cinema	Archive footage	Television special
1965	A Slight Case Of...	Himself	One episode, television special for Roy Kinnear
1965	Thirty-Minute Theatre	Chivers	One episode
1966	In The West End Tonight	Wilfred Compton	Television movie
1966	Rome, Sweet Home	Pentamus	Television movie
	It's a Knockout	Himself	One episode
1968	Comedy Playhouse	Russell	One episode
1968	Father, Dear Father	Les	One episode
1969	The Ugliest Girl in Town	Harry	One episode
1969	The Liver Birds	Simon	One episode

==== 1970s ====
Year	Title	Role	Notes
1971	Here Come the Double Deckers!	Various	Eleven episodes
1971	Beyond Bellet	unknown	Television movie
1972	The Regiment	Private Hanks	One episode
1972	Cosmo and Thingy	Pune	Television movie
1972–1979	The Generation Game	Himself	Three episodes
1973	The Adventures of Black Beauty	Amos	One episode
1973	The Gordon Peters Show	unknown	One episode
1973	Ooh La La!	The Duke	One episode
1973	Sir Yellow	Gregory	Seven episodes
1973	Stars on Sunday	Bob Cratchit	One episode
1974	Charles Dickens' World of Christmas	Bob Cratchit	Television movie
1974–1981	It Ain't Half Hot Mum	Gunner/Bombardier "Gloria" Beaumont	Fifty-six episodes
1975	The Tommy Cooper Hour	unknown	One episode
1975	Carry On Laughing	Charwallah Charlie	One episode
1976–1978	Potter's Picture Palace	Melvyn Disbury	Thirteen episodes
1978	Those Wonderful TV Times	Himself	One episode
1979	Star Turn	Himself	Two episodes
1979–1980	Give Us a Clue	Himself	Two episodes

==== 1980s ====
Year	Title	Role	Notes
1980	It's a Knockout	Himself	Two episodes
1981	Looks Familiar	Himself	One episode
1981	The Childrens Royal Variety Performance	Himself	Television special
1981	The Pyramid Game	Himself	One episode
1981	Family Fortunes	Himself	One episode
1982–1984	On Safari	Himself	Two episodes
1983	No. 73	Himself	One episode
1983–1986	SuperTed	Skeleton	Voice, thirty-five episodes
1983–1984	Punchlines	Himself	Two episodes
1984	Cannon and Ball	Himself	One episode
1984	Babble	Himself	One episode
1984	Entertainment Express	Himself	One episode
1984–1986	What a Carry On	Gunner Shorthouse	Archive footage, nine episodes
1985	Whose Baby?	Himself	One episode
1985	Ultra Quiz	Himself	One episode
1986	Galloping Galaxies!	Superbeing	One episode
1987	Super Gran	P. C. Dumpling	One episode
1988	Comic Relief	Himself	Television special
1989	The Further Adventures of SuperTed	Skeleton	Voice, six episodes
1989	The Childrens Royal Variety Performance	Himself	Television special
1989–1994	You Bet!	Himself	Four episodes
1989–1990	Alfred J. Kwak	Dolf	Fourteen episodes
1989–1990	Sky Star Search	Himself	Fifteen episodes

==== 1990s ====
Year	Title	Role	Notes
1990	The Childrens Royal Variety Performance	Himself	Television special
1990	A Tribute to Terry-Thomas	Himself	Television special
1990–1995	The Dreamstone	Frizz	Voice, fifty-one episodes
1991	Little Dracula	Deadwood	Voice, four episodes
1991	The Happening	Himself	Television movie
1994	Bygones	Himself	One episode
1995	Omnibus	Himself/Bombardier "Gloria" Beaumont	One episode
1995–1996	Budgie the Little Helicopter	Various voices	Voice, twenty-six episodes
1996	The Thin Blue Line	D. S. Quentin Courvoisier	Voice, one episode
1996	An Audience with Freddie Starr	Himself	Television special
1996	Funny You Ask	Himself	One episode
1997	Shooting Stars	Himself	One episode
1997	Tellystack	Himself	Television special
1998	Drop the Dead Donkey	Sir Gordon	Three episodes
1998	Top Tip Challenge	Himself	One episode

==== 2000s ====
Year	Title	Role	Notes
2000	Top Ten	Himself	One episode
2000	I Love A 1970's Christmas	Archive footage	Television special
2000–2006	Countdown	Himself	Twenty-seven episodes
2002	Pongwiffy	Various voices	Voice, twenty-six episodes
2002	Never Had It So Good	Himself	One episode
2003	Doctor Who: Shada	Wilkin	Voice, four episodes
2003	Hogmanay Live	Himself	Television special
2004	Doctors	Ted Bryson	One episode
2004	Revolver	Dave Davids	Four episodes
2004	Britain's Best Sitcom	Himself	Two episodes
2004	Today with Des and Mel	Himself	Two episodes
2004	Richard & Judy	Himself	One episode
2005	EastEnders	Michael Rawlins	Eight episodes
2005	50 Questions of Political Incorrectness	Himself	Television movie
2005	The 100 Greatest Famiy Films	Himself	Television movie
2005	Best Ever Christmas Films	Himself	Television movie
2006	Carry on Quzzing	Gunner Shorthouse	Archive footage
2007	Comedy Connections	Himself	One episode
2007	A Tribute to John Inman	Himself	Television special
2009	Movie Connections	Himself	One episode
2009	The Paul O'Grady Show	Himself	One episode

==== 2010s ====
Year	Title	Role	Notes
2010	The Slammer	The hamster	One episode
2010	Double Decker Memories	Albert the street cleaner	Archive footage, television special
2010–2011	The Legend of Dick and Dom	Blinky	Two episodes
2011	Benidorm	Mr. Pink	Uncredited, one episode
2011	The Alan Titchmarsh Show	Himself	One episode
2011	You've Been Watching... David Croft	Himself / Bombardier "Gloria" Beaumont	One episode
2012	Frankenstein Reborn: The Making of a Hammer Classic	Himself / Young Victor	Archive footage, documentary
2013	Doctor Who: The Companion Chronicles	The Schorchies	Voice, one episode
2013	BBC South Today	Himself	One episode
2013	Cinemassacre's Monster Madness	Himself / Young Victor	Archive footage, documentary
2014	Perry and Croft: Made in Britain	Himself / Bombardier "Gloria" Beaumont	Archive footage, one episode
2014	Lorraine	Himself	One episode
2016	It Was Alright in the...	Himself	One episode
2017	Celebrity 5 Go Motorhoming	Himself	Four episodes
2019	Pointless Celebrities	Himself	One episode

==== 2020s ====
Year	Title	Role	Notes
2022	Mashed	Absalom	Voice, one episode
2022	TV/Film Podcast UK	Himself	One episode
2022–2023	Melvyn's Talking Pictures	Himself	Twenty episodes
2023	National Comedy Awards	Himself	Television special
2023	Not Going Out	Ernest Walker	One episode
2023	Would I Lie to You?	Himself	One episode
2024	Would I Lie to You?	Himself	Archive footage, one episode

== Stage ==
Year	Show	Role	Venues
1950	Masklynnes Mysteries	Indian rope trick	Comedy Theatre
1952	The Trial of Mr. Pickwick	Tommy	Westminster Theatre, London
1952	Apples of Eve	Tommie	Comedy Theatre, London
1955	The Desperate Hours	unknown	unknown
1955	Edward's Son	Jimmy	Arts Theatre
1955	South	unknown	Arts Theatre
1957	The Telescope	Joe Palmer	Salisbury Playhouse
1960	Change for the Angel	unknown	Arts Theatre
1961	The Fantastiks	The mute	Apollo Theatre
1961	Why the Chicken	unknown	Wimbledon Theatre/Streatham Hill Theatre
1962–1968	Spring and Port Wine	Wilfred Compton	Mermaid Theatre/Apollo Theatre
1962	The Witch of Edmonton	The Dog	Mermaid Theatre
1968	Staring at the Sun	Tom	Vaudeville Theatre
1968	Toad of Toad Hall	unknown	Duke of York's Theatre
1971	The Ballad of the Sad Cafe	unknown	Thorndike Theatre
1974	Habeus Corpus	unknown	South Africa
1979	Play it Again, Sam	Allan Felix	The Playhouse, Weston-super-Mare/Key Theatre
1970s	One for the Pot	unknown	unknown
1980	Sink of Slim	Albert	Shanklin Theatre/Marlowe Theatre
1982–1983	It Ain't Half Hot Mum	Gunner Beaumont	Bristol Hippodrome
1983–1984	Run for Your Wife	unknown	Theatre Royal, Bath/Ashcroft Theatre
1984–1985	The Wind in the Willows	Mole	Theatre Royal, Plymouth/Yvonne Arnaud Theatre
1985	My Fat Friend	Henry	Palace Theatre, Manchester/Playhouse Theatre
1985	Seagulls over Sorrento	unknown	unknown
1988	In One Bed... and Out the Other	Maurice	Devonshire Park Theatre/Theatre Royal, Hanley
1988	Who Goes Bare?	Eddie	Alexandra Theatre, Birmingham/Theatre Royal, Nottingham
1993	A Step in Time	The Caretaker	Redgrave Theatre, Farnham
1997	Flahooley	unknown	unknown
2000	Saved by Sex	Maybelline	unknown
2000	The Bespoke Overcoat	Fender	New End Theatre
2007	Cash on Delivery	Uncle George	Gordon Craig Theatre/Globe Theatre
2012	You're Only Young Twice	Gordon "Brooksie" Brooks	Grand Theatre, Wolverhampton/Lyceum Theatre, Crewe
unknown	Bedside Manners	unknown	UK
unknown	Dear Miss Phoebe	unknown	UK
unknown	The Dresser	unknown	UK
unknown	The Long, The Short and The Tall	unknown	UK
unknown	Tomfoolery	unknown	UK

== Discography ==
Year	Title	Notes
1975	It Ain't Half Hot Mum - Featuring The Artists From The Popular BBC-TV Series	Soundtrack from It Ain't Half Hot Mum

== Bibliography ==
- Hayes, Melvyn (1980). "Contributor". David Jacob's Book of Celebrities' Jokes & Anecdotes. By Jacobs, David. Robson Books. p. 65. ISBN 0860511251.
- It Ain't Half Late Mum (2026)
