= Four Weddings and a Funeral =

1994 British film by Mike Newell

- Theatrical release poster
- Directed by: Mike Newell
- Written by: Richard Curtis
- Produced by: Duncan Kenworthy
- Starring: Hugh Grant; Andie MacDowell; Kristin Scott Thomas; Simon Callow; James Fleet; John Hannah; Charlotte Coleman; David Bower; Corin Redgrave; Rowan Atkinson
- Cinematography: Michael Coulter
- Edited by: Jon Gregory
- Music by: Richard Rodney Bennett
- Production companies: PolyGram Filmed Entertainment; Channel Four Films; Working Title Films
- Distributed by: Rank Film Distributors
- Release dates: 20 January 1994 (Sundance); 13 May 1994 (United Kingdom)
- Running time: 117 minutes
- Country: United Kingdom
- Languages: English; British Sign Language
- Budget: £3 million ($4.4 million)
- Box office: £218.5 milion ($245.7 million)

Four Weddings and a Funeral is a 1994 British romantic comedy film directed by Mike Newell. It is the first of several films by screenwriter Richard Curtis to star Hugh Grant, and follows the adventures of Charles (Grant) and his circle of friends through a number of social occasions as they each encounter romance. Andie MacDowell co-stars as Charles's love interest Carrie, with Kristin Scott Thomas, James Fleet, Simon Callow, John Hannah, Charlotte Coleman, David Bower, Corin Redgrave and Rowan Atkinson in supporting roles.

The film was made in six weeks, cost under £3 million, and became an unexpected success and the highest-grossing British film in history at the time, with a worldwide box office total of $245.7 million, and received Academy Award nominations for Best Picture and Best Original Screenplay. Additionally, Grant won the Golden Globe Award for Best Actor – Motion Picture Musical or Comedy and the BAFTA Award for Best Actor in a Leading Role, and the film won the BAFTA Awards' Best Film, Best Direction, and Best Actress in a Supporting Role for Kristin Scott Thomas. The film's success propelled Hugh Grant to international stardom, particularly in the United States.

In 1999, Four Weddings and a Funeral was placed 23rd on the British Film Institute's 100 greatest British films of the 20th century. In 2016, Empire magazine ranked it 21st in their list of the 100 best British films. A 2017 poll of 150 actors, directors, writers, producers and critics for Time Out magazine ranked it the 74th-best British film ever.

Curtis reunited director Newell and the surviving cast for a 25th-anniversary reunion Comic Relief short entitled One Red Nose Day and a Wedding, which aired in the UK during Red Nose Day on 15 March 2019.

== Plot ==
Perpetually late Charles and his flatmate, Scarlett, arrive just in time for the wedding of their friends Angus and Laura in Somerset, where Charles is to serve as the best man. Among the guests are their closest friends: Charles's deaf brother David; aristocratic Fiona and her bumbling brother Tom; and exuberant Gareth and his thoughtful partner Matthew. Charles meets an American woman named Carrie at the reception and end up spending the night together. Carrie, who had previously worked in the U.K., laments that they may have "missed a great opportunity" as she leaves for home in the U.S. Bernard and Lydia, two other friends who know each other platonically, hit it off at the reception. A young woman named Serena becomes smitten with David.

Three months later, Charles and Scarlett are late again, for the wedding of Bernard and Lydia in London. Charles is delighted to encounter Carrie again at the reception, but is disappointed to learn she's engaged to Hamish, a wealthy Scot. He is cornered by several ex-girlfriends, including Henrietta who tells him he's a "serial monogamist" fearful of commitment. Hamish leaves the reception early and Carrie asks Charles to keep her company; they once again spend the night together. Serena, who is learning sign language, tries communicating with David and they dance together.

A month later, Charles receives an invitation to Carrie and Hamish's wedding and encounters Carrie at their wedding gift list store. She asks him to help select a wedding dress. Charles runs after her as she leaves and awkwardly confesses that he loves her; she is touched, but walks away.

Charles arrives at Carrie's wedding after the ceremony has begun and sadly watches her from afar. At the reception, Fiona reveals she has long been in love with Charles, but accepts that her feelings are not reciprocated; Charles expresses sympathy for her. Scarlett meets an American named Chester. Gareth has a heart attack at the reception and dies.

At Gareth's funeral, Matthew expresses his grief by reciting W. H. Auden's "Funeral Blues". Charles thanks Carrie for attending and she admits she liked what he told her before her wedding before kissing him sadly on the cheek. Charles and Tom discuss their group's pride in being single, and the irony of Gareth and Matthew always seeming like a married couple. Charles asks if waiting for true love is futile and Tom says he never expected to find true love, just someone who would accept him as he is.

Ten months later, it is Charles's wedding day to Henrietta. Tom encounters his distant cousin Deirdre, whom he has not seen since childhood, and they are smitten with each other. Carrie tells Charles she and Hamish have separated. David and Matthew counsel Charles to proceed with the wedding anyway. David interrupts the ceremony using sign language, with Charles as his interpreter, to say he believes the groom has doubts and loves someone else. Charles confirms this and Henrietta, furious, punches him.

The friends convene at Charles's flat to sort out these events. Carrie apologises for coming to the church, but Charles accepts the blame for what happened and reaffirms his love for her. Carrie accepts his proposal - of a lifelong commitment without marriage.

A final photo montage shows Henrietta marrying an Army officer, David marrying Serena, Scarlett marrying Chester, Tom marrying Deirdre, Matthew celebrating with a new partner, Fiona standing next to a cardboard cutout of Prince Charles, and Charles and Carrie posing with a baby.

== Cast ==
- Hugh Grant as Charles
- Andie MacDowell as Carrie
- Kristin Scott Thomas as Fiona
- Simon Callow as Gareth
- Charlotte Coleman as Scarlett
- James Fleet as Tom
- John Hannah as Matthew
- David Bower as David
- Corin Redgrave as Hamish Banks
- Rowan Atkinson as Father Gerald
- Timothy Walker as Angus
- Sara Crowe as Laura
- David Haig as Bernard Delaney
- Sophie Thompson as Lydia Hibbot
- Anna Chancellor as Henrietta
- Robin McCaffrey as Serena
- Randall Paul as Chester
- Susanna Hamnett as Deirdre
- Simon Kunz as John
- Rupert Vansittart as George
- Elspet Gray as Laura's mother
- Philip Voss as Laura's father
- Jeremy Kemp as Sir John Delaney

== Production ==
=== Writing ===
Screenwriter Richard Curtis's own experiences as a wedding attendee inspired Four Weddings and a Funeral. According to Curtis, he began writing the script at age 34, after realising he had attended 65 weddings in an 11-year period. At one wedding, he was propositioned by a fellow guest, but he turned her down and forever regretted it; accordingly, he based the origin of Charles and Carrie's romance on that situation.

It took Curtis 17 drafts to reach the final version. He initially planned the film as 'Four Weddings and a Honeymoon' but introduced the funeral theme on the advice of Helen Fielding. He has commented on director Mike Newell's influence; "I come from a school where making it funny is what matters. Mike was obsessed with keeping it real. Every character, no matter how small, has a story, not just three funny lines. It's a romantic film about love and friendship that swims in a sea of jokes."

Curtis chose to omit any mention of the characters' careers, because he did not think a group of friends would realistically discuss their jobs while together at a wedding.

=== Casting ===
Curtis, Newell and the producers began the casting process for Four Weddings in early 1992. Alex Jennings was cast as Charles, but funding for the production fell through in mid-1992. Jennings would eventually go on to play a supporting role in Mindy Kaling's 2019 television miniseries adaptation of the film. The team continued holding auditions for over a year, seeing roughly 70 actors for the role of Charles before Hugh Grant.

Grant was ready to give up acting as a career when he received the script for Four Weddings and a Funeral; he stated in 2016 that: "I wasn't really getting any work at all, and then to my great surprise this script came through the letterbox from my agent, and it was really good. And I rang on and said there must be a mistake, you've sent me a good script." Initially, writer Richard Curtis, who had modelled the character of Charles after himself, was opposed to casting Grant in the role, because he thought Grant was too handsome. Curtis favoured casting Alan Rickman, but Rickman refused to audition. Curtis was eventually persuaded by Newell and the producers to approve Grant's casting.

Jeanne Tripplehorn was originally cast as Carrie, but she had to drop out before filming when her mother died. The role was offered to Marisa Tomei, but she turned it down because her grandfather was sick at the time. Sarah Jessica Parker was also reportedly considered. Andie MacDowell was in London doing publicity for Groundhog Day when she read the script and was subsequently cast. MacDowell took a 75% cut in her fee to appear, receiving $250,000 upfront, but due to the success of the film, she earned around $3 million.

Grant's participation hit another stumbling block when his agent requested a £5,000 rise over the £35,000 salary Grant was offered. The producers initially refused because of the extremely tight budget, but eventually agreed. The supporting cast members were paid £17,500 apiece.

=== Production ===
Duncan Kenworthy produced the film while on sabbatical from Jim Henson Productions. Pre-production for the movie was a long process because funding was erratic, falling through in mid-1992 and leading to much uncertainty. Finally, in early 1993, Working Title Films stepped in to close the gap. Nonetheless, another $1.2 million was cut just before production began in the summer of 1993, forcing the film to be made in just 36 days with a final budget of £2.7 million (approximately $4.4 million in 1994). Channel Four Films contributed £800,000. The budget was so tight that extras had to wear their own wedding clothes, while Rowan Atkinson appeared as a vicar at two of the weddings so production would not have to pay another actor.

Future Home Secretary and Member of Parliament (MP) Amber Rudd was given the credit of "Aristocracy Coordinator" after she arranged for several aristocrats to make uncredited appearances as wedding extras, including Peregrine Cavendish, who was at the time Marquess of Hartington, and the Earl of Woolton, who conveniently wore their own morning suits.

To make Grant look more nerdy, the producers styled him with shaggy hair, glasses and deliberately unflattering, ill-fitting clothes. Grant was encouraged by director Mike Newell to mess up and trip over his lines, written in "convoluted syntax" as Grant describes them, in order to give Charles a stammering, nervous quality. Grant, who struggled with hay fever throughout filming, was unsure of Newell's direction and his performance, which he thought was "atrocious." Regarding Newell, Grant commented that: "He seemed to be giving direction against what I thought were the natural beats of the comedy. He was making a film with texture, grounding it, playing the truths rather than the gags".

==== Filming locations ====
The film was shot mainly in London and the Home Counties, including: Hampstead, Islington where the final moments take place on Highbury Terrace, Greenwich Hospital, Betchworth in Surrey, Amersham in Buckinghamshire, the village of Sarratt in Hertfordshire (wedding number one), St Bartholomew-the-Great church in London (wedding number four), and St Clement's Church, West Thurrock in Essex (the funeral). Exterior shots of guests arriving for the funeral were filmed in Thurrock, Essex, overlooking the River Thames with the backdrop of the Dartford River Crossing and the Queen Elizabeth II Bridge.

Stately homes in Bedfordshire (Luton Hoo for the wedding two's reception) and Hampshire provided exteriors for weddings.

=== Post-production ===
According to Hugh Grant, the initial screening of a rough cut of Four Weddings went very badly.

"I thought we'd screwed it up. When we went to watch a rough cut, all of us, me, Richard Curtis, Mike Newell, the producers, all thought this was the worst film that's ever been perpetrated. We're gonna go and emigrate to Peru when it comes out so no one can actually find us. And then they had a, a few cuts later they took it to Santa Monica for a test screening and everyone loved it. And it was a great surprise."

Throughout production, Gramercy Pictures, the U.S. distributor for the film, sent frequent transatlantic faxes objecting to the explicit language and sexual content, fearing the final product would not be suitable for American distribution or television airings. They particularly objected to the opening scene of the movie, in which Charles and Scarlett say the word "fuck" over and over, after an initial screening of the movie in Salt Lake City led the conservative Mormon members of the city council to walk out. Accordingly, Mike Newell and the actors agreed to reshoot the scene with the British swear word "bugger" to be used in the American version. The executives also objected to the title, believing Four Weddings and a Funeral would turn off male viewers from the film. In its place they suggested such titles as True Love and Near Misses, Loitering in Sacred Places, Skulking Around and Rolling in the Aisles, none of which were accepted.

=== Music and soundtrack ===
The original score was composed by British composer Richard Rodney Bennett. The movie also featured a soundtrack of popular songs, including a cover version of The Troggs' "Love Is All Around" performed by Wet Wet Wet that remained at number 1 on the UK Singles Chart for fifteen weeks and was then the ninth biggest selling single of all time in Britain. This song would later be adapted into "Christmas Is All Around" and sung by the character of Billy Mack in Richard Curtis' 2003 film Love Actually, in which Grant also stars. The soundtrack album sold more than 750,000 units.

== Release ==
Four Weddings and a Funeral had its world premiere in January 1994 at the Sundance Film Festival in Salt Lake City, Utah.

It opened in the United States on 11 March 1994 in five theatres. The box office receipts from the first five days of the film's general release in the United States so impressed the movie's distributor that it decided to spend lavishly on promotion, buying full-page newspaper ads and TV-spots totaling some $11 million. The movie also benefited from much free publicity because of Grant's reception in the United States, where he became an instant sex symbol and undertook a successful media tour promoting the film. Producer Duncan Kenworthy stated that "It was the most amazing luck that when Hugh went on the publicity trail, he turned out to be incredibly funny, and very like the character of Charles. That doesn't ever happen." The film had a wide release in the United States on 15 April 1994.

At the UK premiere in Leicester Square on 11 May 1994, Hugh Grant's then-girlfriend Elizabeth Hurley garnered much publicity for the film when she wore a black Versace safety-pin dress which became a sensation in the press. The film opened in the UK on 13 May 1994.

== Reception ==
=== Critical response ===
Four Weddings and a Funeral received critical acclaim. On review aggregator Rotten Tomatoes, the film holds an approval rating of 92% based on 134 reviews, with an average rating of 7.9/10. The site's critics consensus states, "Hugh Grant ably snatches up the bouquet of leading man status with Four Weddings and a Funeral, a sparkling romantic comedy given real charm by its chummy ensemble and Richard Curtis' sharp-witted screenplay." Metacritic assigned the film a weighted average score of 81 out of 100 based on 19 critics, indicating "universal acclaim".

Film critic Roger Ebert gave the film three-and-a-half stars out of four, calling it "delightful and sly", and directed with "light-hearted enchantment" by Newell. He praised Grant's performance, describing it as a kind of "endearing awkwardness". Todd McCarthy of Variety called it a "truly beguiling romantic comedy" which was "frequently hilarious without being sappily sentimental or tiresomely retrograde." Producer Duncan Kenworthy later attributed much of the success of Four Weddings at the box office to McCarthy's review.

Writing for the Chicago Reader, Jonathan Rosenbaum called the film "generic" and "standard issue", stating that the audience should not "expect to remember it ten minutes later". Time magazine writer Richard Corliss was less scathing, but agreed that it was forgettable, saying that people would "forget all about [the movie] by the time they leave the multiplex," even joking at the end of his review that he had forgotten the film's name.

=== Box office ===
Upon its limited release in the United States, Four Weddings and a Funeral opened with $138,486 from five theatres. In its wide release, the film topped the box office with $4.2 million. The film would go on to gross $52.7 million in the United States and Canada.

In the United Kingdom, the film grossed £1.4 million in its opening weekend, a record for a UK production, and £2.7 million in its opening week from 211 theatres. It was number one for nine consecutive weeks, grossing £27.8 million, making it the second-highest-grossing film of all time in the United Kingdom behind Jurassic Park. It surpassed A Fish Called Wanda as the highest-grossing British film. In France, it was number one at the box office for ten weeks, grossing $34.4 million. It was also number one at the Australian box office for five weeks and was the second-highest-grossing film of the year, grossing $A21.4 million. Overall, it grossed $245.7 million worldwide, generating the highest percentage return on cost of films released in 1994. The success of the film cleared Working Title's past losses and generated over $50 million for Polygram, clearing most of their losses in the four years since they started producing films.

=== Awards and accolades ===
==== Year-end lists ====
- 1st – Glenn Lovell, San Jose Mercury News
- 2nd – Sandi Davis, The Oklahoman
- 3rd – National Board of Review
- 5th – Joan Vadeboncoeur, Syracuse Herald American
- 5th – John Hurley, Staten Island Advance
- 6th – Peter Travers, Rolling Stone
- 6th – Sean P. Means, The Salt Lake Tribune
- 7th – Michael MacCambridge, Austin American-Statesman
- 7th – Kenneth Turan, Los Angeles Times
- 7th – Janet Maslin, The New York Times
- 7th – Todd Anthony, Miami New Times
- 7th – Steve Persall, St. Petersburg Times
- 8th – James Berardinelli, ReelViews
- 8th – Mack Bates, The Milwaukee Journal
- 10th – Kevin Thomas, Los Angeles Times
- 10th – Douglas Armstrong, The Milwaukee Journal
- Top 7 (not ranked) – Duane Dudek, Milwaukee Sentinel
- Top 9 (not ranked) – Dan Webster, The Spokesman-Review
- Top 10 (listed alphabetically, not ranked) – Bob Ross, The Tampa Tribune
- Top 10 (listed alphabetically, not ranked) – Eleanor Ringel, The Atlanta Journal-Constitution
- Top 10 (not ranked) – Howie Movshovitz, The Denver Post
- Top 10 (not ranked) – George Meyer, The Ledger
- Top 10 (not ranked) – Bob Carlton, The Birmingham News
- Best of the year (not ranked) – Jeffrey Lyons, Sneak Previews
- Best "sleepers" (not ranked) – Dennis King, Tulsa World
- Honorable mention – Betsy Pickle, Knoxville News-Sentinel
- Honorable mention – William Arnold, Seattle Post-Intelligencer
- Honorable mention – David Elliott, The San Diego Union-Tribune
- Honorable mention – Robert Denerstein, Rocky Mountain News
- Honorable mention – Michael Mills, The Palm Beach Post
- Honorable mention – Jeff Simon, The Buffalo News

==== Awards ====
| Award | Category | Recipient | Result |
|---|---|---|---|
| Academy Awards | Best Picture | Duncan Kenworthy | Nominated |
| Academy Awards | Best Original Screenplay | Richard Curtis | Nominated |
| BAFTA Awards | Best Film | Duncan Kenworthy | Won |
| BAFTA Awards | Best Direction | Mike Newell | Won |
| BAFTA Awards | Best Original Screenplay | Richard Curtis | Nominated |
| BAFTA Awards | Best Actor | Hugh Grant | Won |
| BAFTA Awards | Best Supporting Actor | Simon Callow | Nominated |
| BAFTA Awards | Best Supporting Actor | John Hannah | Nominated |
| BAFTA Awards | Best Supporting Actress | Kristin Scott Thomas | Won |
| BAFTA Awards | Best Supporting Actress | Charlotte Coleman | Nominated |
| BAFTA Awards | Best Editing | Jon Gregory | Nominated |
| BAFTA Awards | Best Film Music | Richard Rodney Bennett | Nominated |
| Golden Globe Awards | Best Musical or Comedy | Four Weddings and a Funeral | Nominated |
| Golden Globe Awards | Best Actor – Musical or Comedy | Hugh Grant | Won |
| Golden Globe Awards | Best Actress – Musical or Comedy | Andie MacDowell | Nominated |
| Golden Globe Awards | Best Screenplay | Richard Curtis | Nominated |
| Directors Guild of America Awards | Outstanding Directing – Feature Film | Mike Newell | Nominated |
| Australian Film Institute Awards | Best Foreign Film | Four Weddings and a Funeral | Won |
| British Comedy Awards | Best Comedy Film | Four Weddings and a Funeral | Won |
| César Awards | Best Foreign Film | Four Weddings and a Funeral | Won |
| Chicago Film Critics Awards | Most Promising Actor | Hugh Grant | Won |
| Evening Standard British Film Awards | Best Actress | Kristin Scott Thomas | Won |
| Evening Standard British Film Awards | Best Screenplay | Richard Curtis | Won |
| London Critics' Circle Film Awards | British Film of the Year | Four Weddings and a Funeral | Won |
| London Critics' Circle Film Awards | British Director of the Year | Mike Newell | Won |
| London Critics' Circle Film Awards | British Producer of the Year | Duncan Kenworthy | Won |
| London Critics' Circle Film Awards | British Screenwriter of the Year | Richard Curtis | Won |
| Writers Guild of America Awards | Best Original Screenplay | Richard Curtis | Won |
| Writers' Guild of Great Britain Awards | Film – Screenplay | Richard Curtis | Won |

=== Legacy ===
The film was listed at number 23 in the BFI Top 100 British films published in 1999. It was voted the 27th-greatest comedy film of all time by readers of Total Film in 2000. In 2004, the same magazine named it the 34th-greatest British film of all time. It is number 96 on Bravo's "100 Funniest Movies".

The Guardian, in a 20th-anniversary retrospective of Four Weddings, stated that "Its influence on the British film industry, on romantic-comedy writing, on the pop charts, on funeral readings, on haircuts, was enormous."

Hugh Grant commented in 2016 on the experience of the film's phenomenal success and its effect on his career: "I was making An Awfully Big Adventure at the time that Four Weddings came out, with Mike Newell again, same director, even tinier budget, in Dublin. And we'd get back from brutal days on the set, very long and no money, and the fax machines...were coming out saying that now your film Four Weddings is #5 in America, now it's #3, now it's #1 and here's an offer Hugh, for Captain Blood and they'll pay you $1 million. It was completely surreal."

== Derivative works ==
=== Hulu anthology television miniseries ===
In 2019, streaming service Hulu aired an eponymous anthology television series based upon the film, to be written and executive produced by Mindy Kaling and Matt Warburton, with Richard Curtis also serving as an executive producer. It starred Nathalie Emmanuel, Nikesh Patel, Rebecca Rittenhouse and John Reynolds as the core group of four friends. It was poorly received, with critics finding it derivative, cliché and mediocre.

=== One Red Nose Day and a Wedding ===
On 5 December 2018, it was announced that Richard Curtis had written One Red Nose Day and a Wedding, a 25th-anniversary Comic Relief television reunion short film. The original film's director, Mike Newell, returned, along with the film's surviving cast, including Hugh Grant, Andie MacDowell, Kristin Scott Thomas, John Hannah, Rowan Atkinson, James Fleet, David Haig, Sophie Thompson, David Bower, Robin McCaffrey, Anna Chancellor, Rupert Vansittart, Simon Kunz, Sara Crowe and Timothy Walker.

It was filmed on 13–14 December 2018 at St James' Church, Islington, London. It centered on the reunion of all the characters from the original film at the wedding of Charles and Carrie's daughter Miranda to Fiona's daughter Faith. The involvement of additional cast members Lily James and Alicia Vikander, who played the young couple getting married, was not announced until the day the film aired in the UK. The film aired in the U.S. on their Red Nose Day on 23 May 2019.

== See also ==
- Notting Hill (1999), also written by Curtis and starring Grant
- Love Actually (2003), another film by Curtis starring Grant and Atkinson
- London in film
- Black Versace dress of Elizabeth Hurley, worn by Hurley to the film's premiere
- List of films featuring the deaf and hard of hearing
- Parey Hut Love, a 2019 Pakistani film which is a loose remake
