= Get 100 =

British children's quiz show

- Created by: TBS
- Presented by: Reggie Yates (Series 1); Hardeep Singh Kohli (Series 2)
- Narrated by: Dave Chapman (Series 1)
- Country of origin: United Kingdom
- No. of series: 2
- No. of episodes: 82

Production
- Producer: BBC Scotland
- Running time: 30 minutes

Original release
- Network: BBC Two (Series 1); BBC One (Series 2: Episodes 1-27); CBBC Channel (Series 2: Episodes 28-52)
- Release: 16 April 2007 – 26 February 2009

Get 100 is a British television children's quiz programme that was broadcast by CBBC between 16 April 2007 and 26 February 2009. It was originally hosted by Reggie Yates for the first series, then Hardeep Singh Kohli for the second series.

== Format ==
=== Series 1 ===
The aim of the game is to get exactly, or as close to, 100 points by the end of 12 questions. The answer to each question is a number, which is the number of points you have "to play with". With the points you can keep them, give them to someone, if needed take them away from yourself or, if possible, take them away from someone else. If you have 100 at the end of the game you get the ultimate "prize pod". This is a whole room full of games, computers, televisions, and similar prizes but if no-one gets 100, then the closest to 100, at the end of the game, gets to pick one of the prizes in the prize pod.

=== Series 2 ===
The show was changed considerably. It had new graphics, no voiceover, a new presenter and a new logo. The most noticeable change was that the original "preliminary" rounds and the Friday final were changed. In this series, they played as normal but did not have a final and instead, the winner of each show won a prize from the prize pod. The final question on each of these shows was selected separately at the end.

== Participation ==
The game had 4 contestants and an audience of roughly 130. Each contestant has a section supporting them. The answer to any question is a number between 1-99 and contestants get 10 seconds' thinking time. If a contestant gets a question wrong, then it moves on to the next person and if they don't get it right then it will move on again and so on until it comes to the last person.

== Facilities ==
It is run by BBC Scotland in Glasgow and filmed in their studio. The studio has four big screens, surrounding the players.

== Transmissions ==
Series	Episodes	Originally released	
Series	Episodes	First released	Last released
1	30	16 April 2007	25 May 2007
2	52	15 September 2008	26 February 2009
