= David Bower =

British actor (born 1969)

- Born: 1969 (age 56–57); Wrexham, North Wales
- Years active: 1993–present

David Bower (born 1969) is a Welsh actor, best known for his role as David in the hit romantic comedy Four Weddings and a Funeral. Born in Wrexham, North Wales, he is deaf and a BSL user and took his degree in the British Theatre of the Deaf (established by Pat Keysell). After university he joined what became the Signdance Collective working as sign dancer and choreographer. The collective was re-established in 2001 with Bower as artistic director and Isolte Avila as Dance Director.

In addition to film and television, Bower has also performed in radio plays for the BBC.

== Credits ==
=== Film and television ===
Year	Title	Format	Role	Notes
1994	Four Weddings and a Funeral	Film	David	
1994	Shatter Dead	Film	Dead People	
1996	Hetty Wainthropp Investigates	Television series	Malcolm Stone	Episode: Eye Witness
1998	Casualty	Television series	Kevin Healy	Episode: It's Good to Talk
2011	Little Voices	Film	Quint	
2020	Drive Me to the End	Film	Simon	

=== Radio ===
Year	Title	Role	Notes
2008	The Hunchback of Notre Dame	Quasimodo	A collaboration between BBC Radio 4 and the Graeae Theatre Company.
2010	A Small Piece of Silence	Joe	Afternoon Play for BBC Radio 4.
2010	Dragonfly	Cal	Afternoon Play for BBC Radio 4.
2013	Bad Elvis	Aidan	Afternoon Play for BBC Radio 4.

=== Opera ===
Year	Title	Role	Notes
2019	Pierrot Lunaire by Arnold Schoenberg	Pierrot	A collaboration between SignDance International and formidAbility, performed at Grimeborn.
