= Hardeep Singh Kohli =

British broadcaster (born 1969)

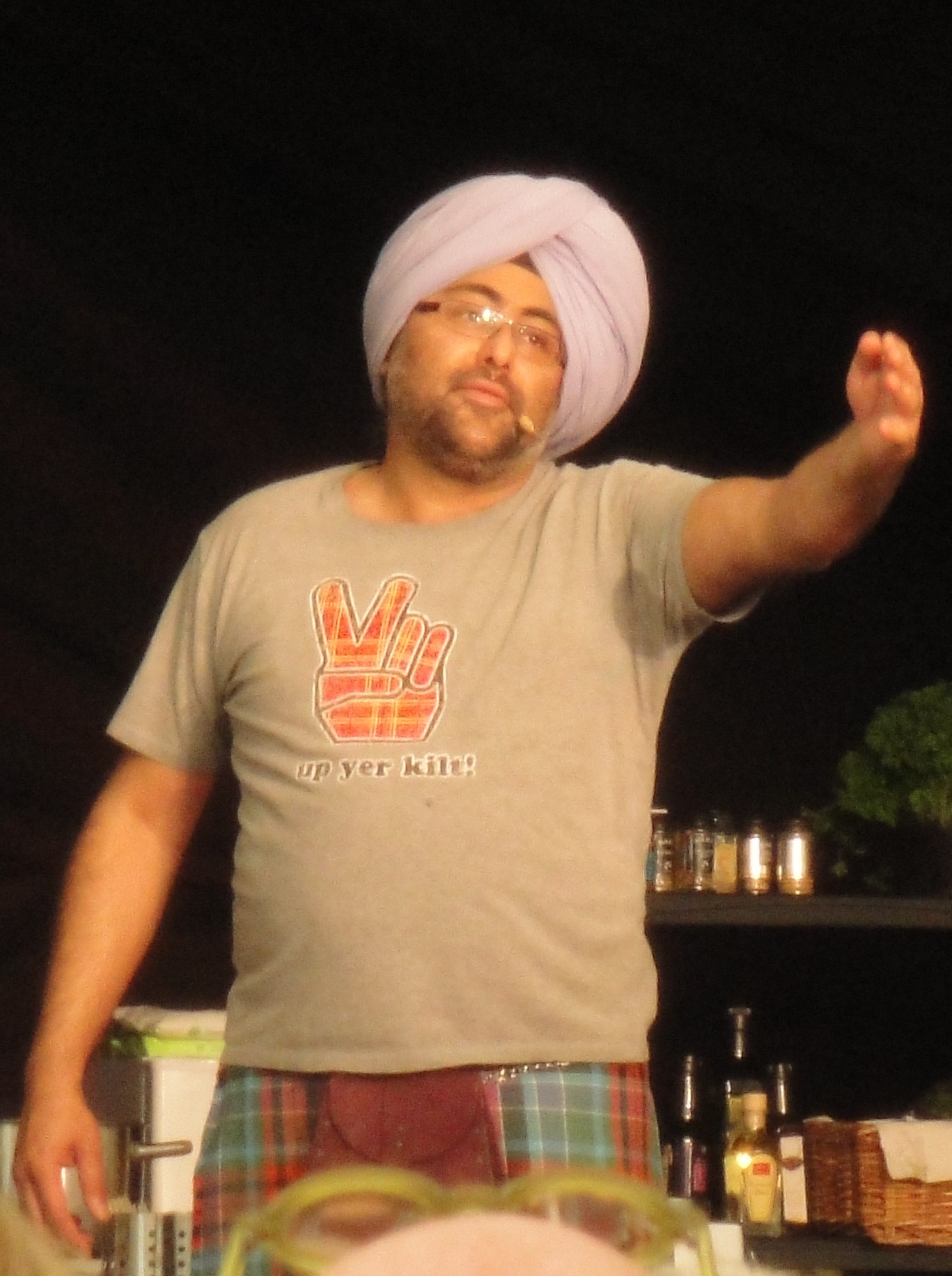
- Kohli in 2012
- Born: 21 January 1969 (age 57); London, England
- Education: University of Glasgow
- Occupations: Presenter, comedian, writer, director
- Relatives: Sanjeev Kohli (brother)

Hardeep Singh Kohli (born 21 January 1969) is a British presenter of Indian-Punjabi descent, born in London and moved to Glasgow when he was 4 years old. He is known as a comedian, writer and director who has appeared on various radio and television programmes. He was a finalist on Celebrity MasterChef in 2006 and a contestant on Celebrity Big Brother in 2018.

On 9 August 2023, Hardeep was arrested and charged in connection with alleged "non-recent" sexual offences. He was due to appear in court at a later date. His arrest followed an investigation conducted by The Times in 2020, in which several people had 'raised concerns about him'. On 9 August 2025, Hardeep appeared in court to be charged with six sex-related charges against three women. On 24 November 2025, he was further charged in court with rape and domestic abuse.

== Early life ==
Kohli was born in London and moved to Glasgow, Scotland, when he was four. His Sikh parents came to Britain from India in the 1960s. The family's roots lie in the Punjab. His mother was a social worker, and his father a teacher who became a successful landlord in the Bishopbriggs suburb. His younger brother is the actor and writer Sanjeev Kohli.

Kohli's first school was Hillhead Primary School in the West End of Glasgow, after which he attended Meadowburn Primary in Bishopbriggs. At age eight, he moved to John Ogilvie Hall, the primary school of St Aloysius' College, a private Roman Catholic school in central Glasgow. Kohli studied Law at the University of Glasgow, graduating in 1990. While at university he worked in a vegetarian restaurant and as an usher at the Citizens Theatre.

== Career ==
=== Television ===
After graduating from university, Kohli joined the BBC Scotland graduate production trainee scheme. He later worked in BBC Television Centre, London, directing children's TV, before moving to Youth and Entertainment Features in Manchester to become a series director on Janet Street-Porter's series Reportage. He was a director of It'll Never Work, which was the first children's TV show to win an award from the Royal Television Society and BAFTA in its first season.

Kohli left the corporation in 1996 to work independently. He directed commercials and worked in TV development and broadcast occasionally on BBC Radio 5 Live.

He wrote, directed and starred in Channel 4's Meet the Magoons in 2004. The critical response was lukewarm and it failed to find an audience. The more positive reviewers listed here include Nancy Banks-Smith who wrote it was "modern to the point of surreal", while A. A. Gill put forward a hope that it might "evolve into something classic"

In September 2006, Kohli took part in the first series of BBC One's Celebrity MasterChef programme, reaching the final along with Roger Black and finishing second to the ultimate winner, Matt Dawson. In January 2007, he had a three-part series on Channel 4, £50 Says You'll Watch This. The series was the first documentary exploring all forms of gambling. The show included Kohli taking part in a celebrity card game and visiting casinos in Las Vegas. In October 2006, February 2007 and January 2009, he appeared on the BBC political panel programme Question Time, and was an occasional presenter on Newsnight Review, Saturday Live on BBC Radio 4 and Loose Ends.

In 2008, Kohli presented New British Kitchen, a cookery series for UKTV with John Torode. This was followed by Kohli's solo show "Chefs and the City" for the same channel. He also appeared on Gordon Ramsay: Cook Along Live and participated in a celebrity edition of The Apprentice to raise money for charity. Sport Relief Does The Apprentice was part of the BBC's annual charity initiative Sport Relief and aired on 12 and 14 March 2008. He was the first Celebrity Apprentice to be "fired".

He appeared in the Scottish segment of the BBC's 2008 Children in Need appeal, anchored by Jackie Bird and Des Clarke.

Also in 2008, Kohli filmed a documentary about Scientology, mainly the so-called Free Zone, titled The Beginner's Guide to L. Ron Hubbard. He presented a documentary, In Search of the Tartan Turban, which explored cultural identity as a Briton and a Scot belonging to an ethnic minority. The show won a Schools BAFTA, leading to Channel 4 commissioning a five part series called "Hardeep Does..." that covered topical issues, including sex, religion and pets.

Kohli was the presenter of the second series of CBBC game show Get 100. In June 2009, he was one of five volunteers who took part in a BBC series of three programmes Famous, Rich and Homeless about living penniless on the streets of London.

Kohli has appeared as a panelist on The Wright Stuff on Channel Five. He occasionally hosted the programme when Matthew Wright (the host presenter) was on holiday or ill.

Kohli was a reporter for The One Show, but was suspended in 2009 for six months amidst informal allegations of "inappropriate behaviour" towards a researcher.

On 16 August 2018, Kohli entered the British television show, Celebrity Big Brother as a celebrity housemate. He was nominated four times for eviction while in the Big Brother house, before he was finally eliminated on 7 September 2018, becoming the fifth housemate to be evicted.

=== Radio ===
Kohli wrote and presented BBC Radio 4's "Hippy Trail". Writing in the Telegraph, Gillian Reynolds felt "he patently had no real interest in the European and American hippies who trekked overland to India in the 1960s. At times, he seemed positively contemptuous, as if he were wondering why he was bothering". Kohli also presented BBC Radio 4 commissions, "Where Scotland Meets England" and "Where England Meets Wales".

In 2010, Radio 2 broadcast "Great British Faith", a city based series looking at the spiritual life and history of six British cities. This was described as "terrific" by Elisabeth Mahoney in The Guardian who wrote that she was "impressed by the depth and scope of their portraits. Kohli brought to the programmes a real sense of the spiritual textures of these urban landscapes."

Under producer Adam Fowler, he presented a BBC Radio 4 documentary 'The Loneliness of the Goalkeeper' which won a prize in Illinois in 2010 as Third Coast Directors' Choice Award for Ladbroke Productions.

In 2011, Kohli presented a series about words and language, "15 by 15", which took a Silver at the New York Radio Festival.

In 2012, Kohli recorded his first series of Hardeep’s Sunday Lunch, a programme that explored people's lives while Kohli cooked lunch. The sixth series was broadcast in the autumn of 2017 and early 2018.

In August 2013, Kohli presented his third edition of The Food Programme on Radio 4, "Ode to a Bacon Roll", about his fondness for bacon.

=== Journalism ===
From 2007 to 2009, Kohli wrote Hardeep is your Love, a column for Scotland on Sunday. He was twice put forward but was unplaced as Columnist of the Year at the Scottish Press Awards.

Kohli occasionally writes for The Guardian, The Observer, GQ magazine, Metro, The Spectator and The Independent. As a feature writer for High Life Magazine for British Airways, he was nominated but unplaced in 2014 for the AITO Travel Writer of the Year.

From mid-2014 until the end of 2015, Kohli was the food writer at the Daily Record and wrote a short column for the Sunday Herald.

=== Comedy ===
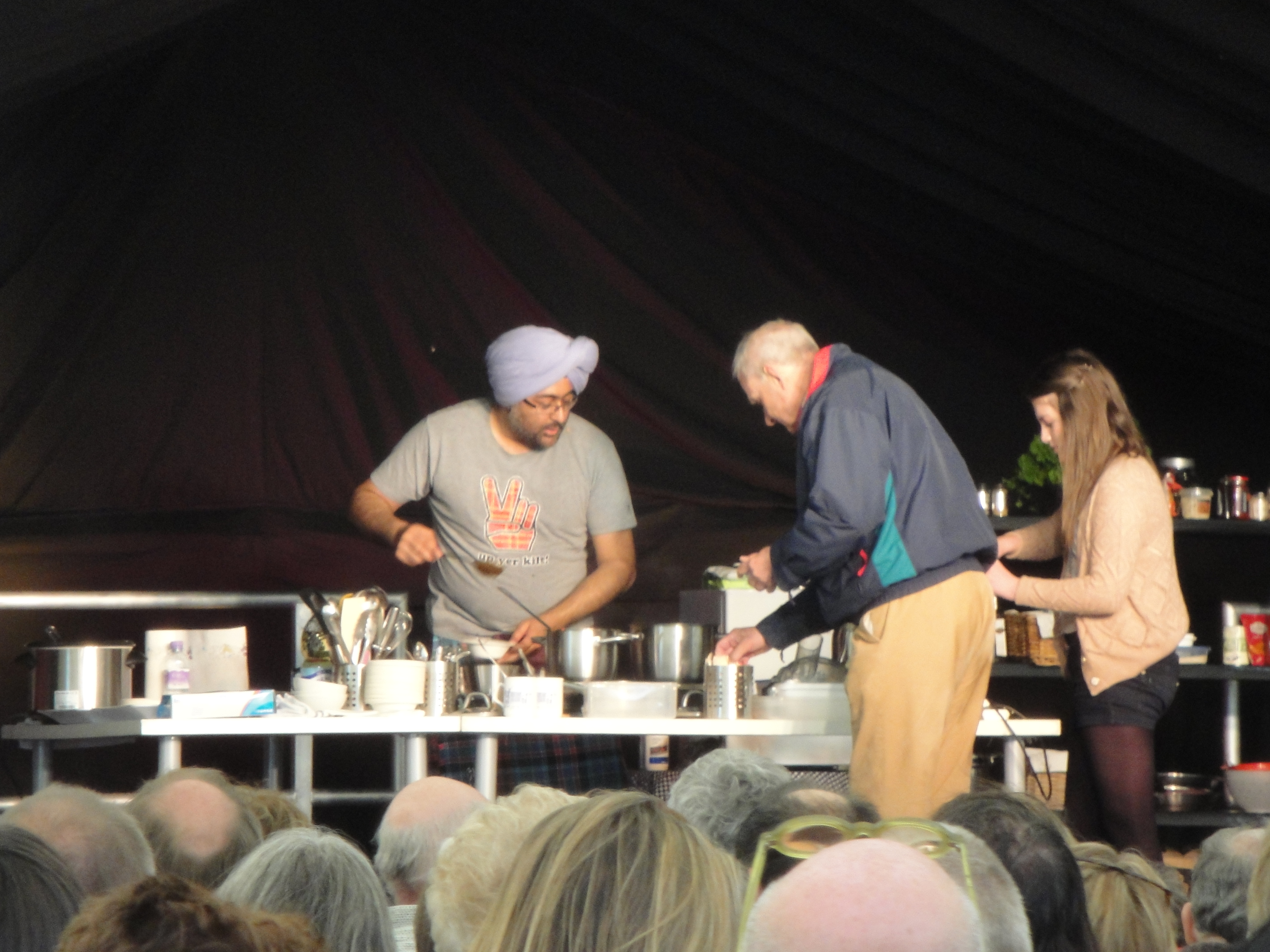
Hardeep Singh Kohli performing at Isle of Arts 2012, in Ventnor, Isle of Wight.

At the Edinburgh Festival Fringe in August 2009, Kohli performed his debut one-man show, The Nearly Naked Chef, billed as 'the first live curry cooking comedy show ever'.

In 2013, he did a short run of new material which became "Hardeep is Your Love" in 2014. The following year his show was titled "Bigmouth Strikes Again". In 2016, his love of music was the inspiration for "Mixtape: My Life Through Music". "The show needed more joke content, structure and general fleshing out to be complete. Perhaps if he could get through more than just three songs, that might help," said BroadwayBaby.

=== Presenter ===
Hardeep hosted the Brit Asia TV Music Awards on its debut in 2010 and in 2011 and 2012.

=== Literature ===
Kohli wrote a book about food and travel in India, Indian Takeaway (2008), described by The Guardian as 'likeable but clumsy'. Also in 2008, Kohli was a judge for the Man Booker Prize.

=== Other ===
Hardeep was a board member of the National Theatre of Scotland. In 2017 Kohli became a Fellow of Royal Society of Arts, and Creative Director at the Innovation Academy. In 2023, he was controversially voted onto the executive committee of the British-American Project.

== Personal life ==
From 1990 to 2009 Kohli was married to Sharmilia, they had a son and a daughter.

== Politics ==
Kohli returned to Scotland prior to the 2014 referendum on Scottish independence in order to take a prominent role in the Yes Scotland campaign. Kohli wrote and spoke in support of the campaign, appearing at the rallies for Scottish independence on 22 September 2012 and on 21 September 2013 in Edinburgh. He joined the Scottish National Party (SNP) in November 2014, following the "Yes" campaign's defeat.

== Legal issues ==
=== Property management ===
In 2008, Kohli's rental properties in Glasgow were condemned by officials as "grubby and dirty" and substandard and he was warned about his conduct as a landlord.

=== Driving without a licence ===
On 25 March 2019, Kohli appeared at Glasgow Sheriff Court, where he admitted to driving without a licence on West Nile Street in Glasgow on 10 April 2018. Kohli's driving licence had been revoked in October 2017. The court heard Kohli had experienced tingling in his foot and went to the doctor to find out what was wrong. The doctor then wrote to the DVLA about his problem which meant his licence was cancelled. Kohli's defence lawyer Garvey McCardle said: "He was worried about his foot and he was experiencing pins and needles and he contacted his doctor. She was zealous in her approach and she told the DVLA that it led to numbness, he didn’t know she wrote to them". He was convicted and fined £180.

=== Sexual harassment and charges ===
In 2009, Kohli was suspended from The One Show due to informal allegations of "inappropriate behaviour" towards a researcher.

In 2020, Kohli was accused of sexual harassment by multiple women, including some in the comedy industry. Lulu Popplewell alleged that his offer of help with her career at a show was accompanied by an invitation to spend the night in his bed and has accused Kohli of attempting to abuse his power. In response, Kohli said: "It is now clear to me that my actions and words made women feel intimidated, undermined and undervalued. For this, I apologise unreservedly and can only hope to live a life of greater understanding."

On 9 August 2023, Hardeep was arrested and charged in connection with alleged "non-recent" sexual offences. His arrest followed an investigation conducted by The Times in 2020, in which several people had 'raised concerns about him'. On 9 August 2025, Hardeep appeared in court to be charged with six sex-related charges against three women. On 24 November 2025, he was further charged in court with rape and domestic abuse. On 26 June 2026, it was reported that the trial was scheduled to start on 1 October 2027.

== Television ==
- Celebrity Big Brother (2018)
