= Little Voices (film) =

- Directed by: Christopher McFall
- Written by: Christopher McFall
- Starring: Clare Elizabeth Alberie, David Bower, Jon Griffin
- Cinematography: Christopher Lang
- Edited by: Christopher McFall
- Release date: 23 March 2011
- Country: United Kingdom
- Language: English

Little Voices is a 2011 short student film that was directed and written by Christopher McFall. The film was released on 23 March 2011 and stars David Bower as a deaf man struggling to cope with the loss of his partner. Filming took place during August 2010.

== Synopsis ==
Quint (David Bower) is a deaf-mute who has recently lost the love of his life. The death sends Quint reeling and he finds himself incapable of coping with this reality. The film spans a day in Quint's life and shows his obsession with typography, as he imagines people speaking in subtitles.

== Cast ==
- Clare Elizabeth Alberie as August (as Claire Alberie)
- David Bower as Quint
- Jon Griffin as Officer Clarendon
- Richard Highgate as Officer Walbaum (as Richard Roberts)
- Rebecca Hurst as June
- John Jenner as Officer Brody
