= Sanjeev Kohli =

Scottish actor (born 1971)

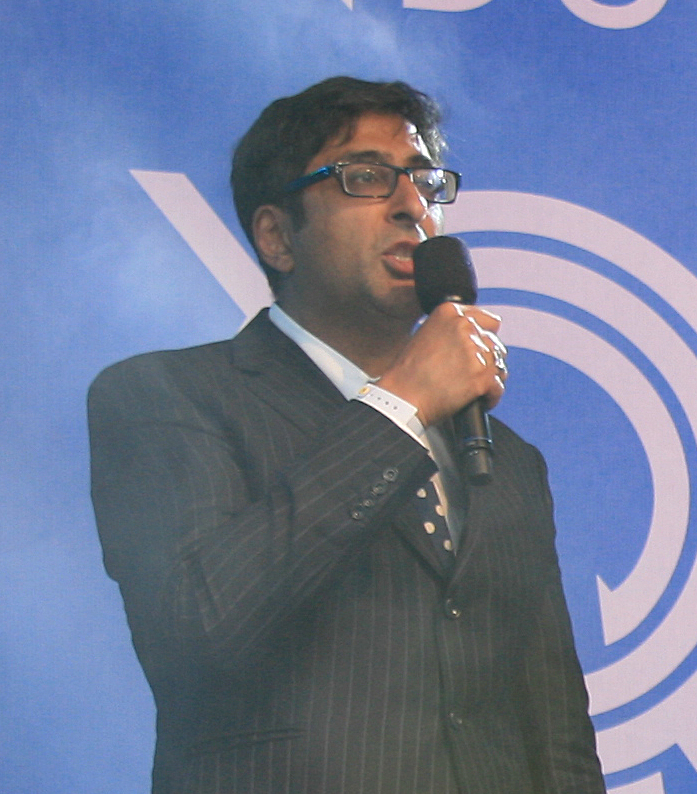
- Kohli speaking at a publicity event ahead of the 2014 Commonwealth Games
- Born: Sanjeev Singh Kohli; 30 November 1971 (age 54); London, England
- Education: University of Glasgow
- Occupations: Actor; comedian; writer
- Years active: 1990s–present
- Known for: Still Game; Meet the Magoons; Fags, Mags and Bags; River City
- Spouse: Fiona
- Children: 3
- Relatives: Hardeep Singh Kohli (brother)

Sanjeev Singh Kohli (born 30 November 1971) is a Scottish actor, comedian, and writer. He is best known for his role as shopkeeper Navid Harrid in the BBC sitcom Still Game (2002–2007, 2016–2019), Ramesh Majhu in the radio sitcom Fags, Mags and Bags (2007–2025), and AJ Jandhu in the BBC Scotland soap opera River City (2015–2022). Since 2019, Kohli has hosted his own television talk show Sanjeev Kohli's Big Talk, on the BBC Scotland channel.

== Early life ==
Kohli was born in London on 30 November 1971, to a social worker and a teacher, who had emigrated to the United Kingdom in 1966 from India. When he was three years old, they moved to Scotland.

Kohli's parents could afford to move him, aged six, and his brothers to be educated by the Jesuits at St Aloysius' College, a Roman Catholic school in Central Glasgow. To pay for their children's education, Kohli's parents ran a corner shop.

Kohli attended Glasgow University, initially to study Medicine, but changed course to study Mathematics, gaining a first-class degree, and subsequently studied for a PhD.

== Career ==
Kohli starred as Surjit Magoon in Meet the Magoons, co-written by his brother Hardeep, for Channel 4. and has appeared in several episodes of the BBC comedy series Look Around You as Synthesizer Patel. He is a former presenter of the BBC's Asian Network and has previously written for Goodness Gracious Me, The Big Breakfast and Chewin' the Fat, which was also written by future Still Game co-stars, Ford Kiernan and Greg Hemphill.

In December 2006, the Sunday Mail revealed that Kohli would be starring in a major ITV thriller, Losing Gemma. Starring alongside Alice Eve, he played "a member of the British High Commission, who helps a young British tourist jailed in Delhi, India". Kohli revealed in 2007 that he would be working on a radio comedy project for BBC Radio 4, entitled Fags, Mags and Bags. The series was broadcast in 2008 and was nominated for a Sony Award. The Daily Record also revealed Kohli would be writing for ITV children's show, My Life as a Popat. Kohli has also starred in BBC Three's Rush Hour as an intolerant taxicab driver, and on the same channel in Phoo Action as a television news presenter.

On 21 August 2007, he presented a show called 10 Things To Hate About The Edinburgh Festival. Kohli also sometimes appears as a pundit on BBC One Scotland's Saturday afternoon Sportscene football programme. Kohli made a brief cameo in a speaking role as himself in an episode of BBC's VideoGaiden, where he received a fish in the mail as a gift from the hosts in an attempt to recreate the Nintendo game Animal Crossing. One of the hosts was Robert Florence, a writer whom Kohli worked with on Chewin' the Fat.

In February 2008, it was announced that he would play the role of God in the video for Glasgow band Attic Lights single "God".

In 2014, Kohli joined the rest of the cast of Still Game in the comeback live show at the SSE Hydro in Glasgow. There were 21 performances of the sold-out show.

Since April 2019, he has hosted Sanjeev Kohli's Big Talk on the BBC Scotland channel.

== Personal life ==
Kohli lives in Glasgow with his wife, Fiona, and their three children.

He has two elder brothers, including Hardeep Singh Kohli.

== Filmography ==
Year	Title	Role	Notes	Channel
2002	Comedy Lab	Surjit	Meet the Magoons Special	E4
2002–2007, 2016–2019	Still Game	Navid Harrid	Series regular	BBC One
2004	Look Around You	Synthesizer Patel		BBC Two
2004–2005	Shoebox Zoo	Mr Kasmani	Series regular	BBC One
2005	Meet the Magoons	Surjit	Series regular	Channel 4
2007	The Peter Serafinowicz Show	Various characters	Series regular	BBC Two
2009	Hope Springs	Mo Khan	Series regular	BBC One
2010	Rab C Nesbitt	Mr Khan	Guest role	BBC Two
2010	Angelos Epithemiou's Moving On	Gupta	Series regular	BBC Three
2011	Gary Tank Commander	Director	Guest role	BBC Two
2011	The Hour	Himself	Guest co-presenter (10 episodes)	STV
2012	Fresh Meat	Dr Minaj	Recurring role	Channel 4
2013	Bob Servant	Norrie	Guest role	BBC Four
2013	Filth	Sunil	Film	
2013	The IT Crowd	Booth		Channel 4
2014	Walter	Hardeep		
2014	Still Game: Live at the Hydro	Navid Harrid	Main cast	BBC One
2015	Fried	Mike Fagins		BBC Three
2015	You Me and the Apocalypse	Doctor	Guest role	Sky 1
2015–2022	River City	Amandeep 'AJ' Jandhu	Series regular	BBC One
2016	Cold Feet	Shopkeeper		ITV
2018	Stan & Ollie	Glasgow Empire Manager	Film	
2019	Dark Sense	Sir Parduman Nagra	Film	
2019	Shooting Clerks	Jared Patel	Film	
2020	Lost at Christmas	Sid	Film	
2022	Magpie Murders	Sajid Khan / Dr Kamal	Series regular	BBC One
2022	Little English	Ranjeet	Film	
2023	Stonehouse	Prosecuting Counsel		ITV
2024	The Madame Blanc Mysteries	Sonny Montario	Guest role	Channel 5 / Acorn TV
2024	Dinosaur	Sachin	BBC comedy	BBC Three
2024	Sharp Instinct: Volume II	Ravi Khossla	Film	
2024	Moonflower Murders	Sajid	Post-production	BBC One
2025	Fight or Flight	Pilot	Film	
2025	Dept. Q	Martin Fleming	Series regular	Netflix
2025	Bringing in the Bells	Himself	Presenter	STV
2025	Gifted	Mr Jackson	Series regular	CBBC
2025	Midsomer Murders	Saj Solanki	Episode: "Death Strikes Three"	ITV
2026	The Chief		Series regular (series 2)	BBC Scotland
