= Frazer Hines =

English actor (born 1944)

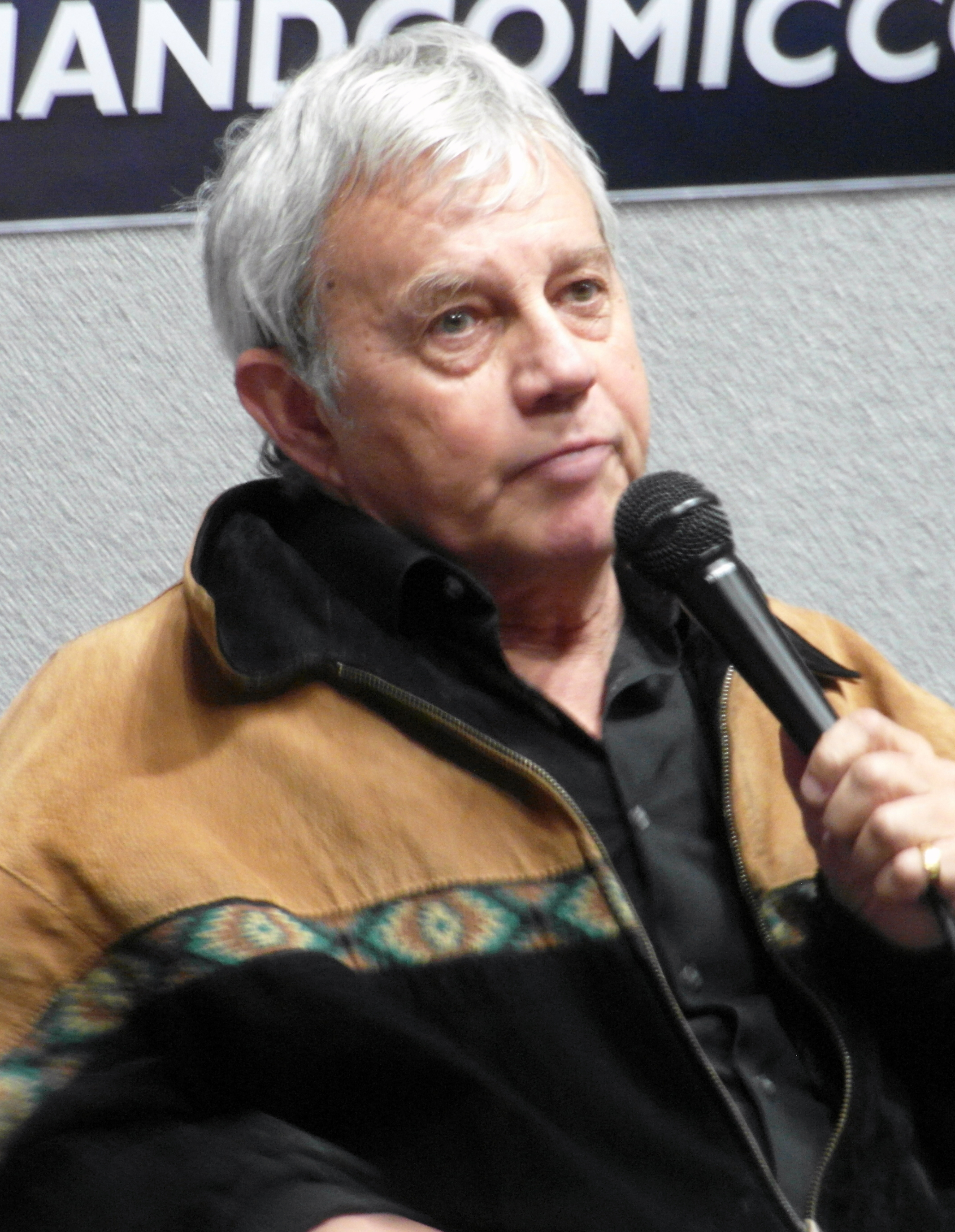
- Hines in 2014
- Born: Frazer Simpson Frederick Hines; 22 September 1944 (age 82); Horsforth, Yorkshire, England
- Education: Corona Theatre School
- Occupation: Actor
- Years active: 1955–present
- Television: Doctor Who; Emmerdale Farm
- Spouses: Gemma Craven (m. 1981; div. 1984); Liz Hobbs (m. 1991; div. 2003)
- Website: frazerhines.co.uk

Frazer Simpson Frederick Hines (born 22 September 1944) is an English actor. He began his career as a child actor and appeared in A King in New York (1957) with Charlie Chaplin. He later played Jamie McCrimmon in Doctor Who, appearing in more episodes than any other companion. He was a regular in the series alongside Patrick Troughton as the Second Doctor between 1966 and 1969, and made guest appearances in The Five Doctors (1983) and The Two Doctors (1985). He also played Joe Sugden in Emmerdale Farm between 1972 and 1994.

== Early life ==
Hines was born in Horsforth, a north-west suburb of Leeds in the West Riding of Yorkshire, the third son of Bill and Molly Hines. His mother was Scottish and came from Port Glasgow. Shortly after Hines was born, the family moved to Harrogate where his mother ran a boarding house. As a child, Hines went to the Western Board Primary School and then Norwood College. Through his parents attending a local amateur dramatics group and regularly visiting the cinema, Hines discovered a love for performing and began attending the Margery Newbury School of Dancing every Saturday morning. It was here that during a performance aged seven at the Royal Hall in Harrogate that Hines sang the song Louise while doing an impersonation of Maurice Chevalier which generated newspaper headlines reading "A young star is born here tonight at the Royal Hall Harrogate".

Because of this success, Hines began attending Corona Theatre School in London where his classmates included Richard O'Sullivan, Dennis Waterman, Jeremy Bulloch and Francesca Annis.

== Career ==
=== Early career and breakthrough ===
Hines made his debut in the film John and Julie (1955) as an extra in a crowd scene, Hines went on to have minor roles in Moby Dick, The Weapon and X the Unknown (all 1956). Hines made his stage debut in 1956 in a production of The Good Woman of Setzuan at the Royal Court Theatre alongside Peggy Ashcroft and Joan Plowright. Hines' breakthrough role was in 1957 where he performed the role of Napoleon in a six-part television adaptation of John Buchan's 1922 novel Huntingtower. That same year, Hines appeared alongside Charlie Chaplin in the film A King in New York. From 1957 and throughout the 1960s, he performed a steady stream of roles in various television series, such as Jan in The Silver Sword (1957–58), Tim Birch in Emergency Ward 10 (1963–64), and Roger Wain in Coronation Street (1965). He appeared in a 1964 serial, Smuggler's Bay, with Patrick Troughton.

With a well-established career in television, Hines acted in feature films less frequently, but appeared in I Could Go On Singing (1963) with Judy Garland and he provided an uncredited voice for the James Bond film You Only Live Twice (1967).

=== Doctor Who ===
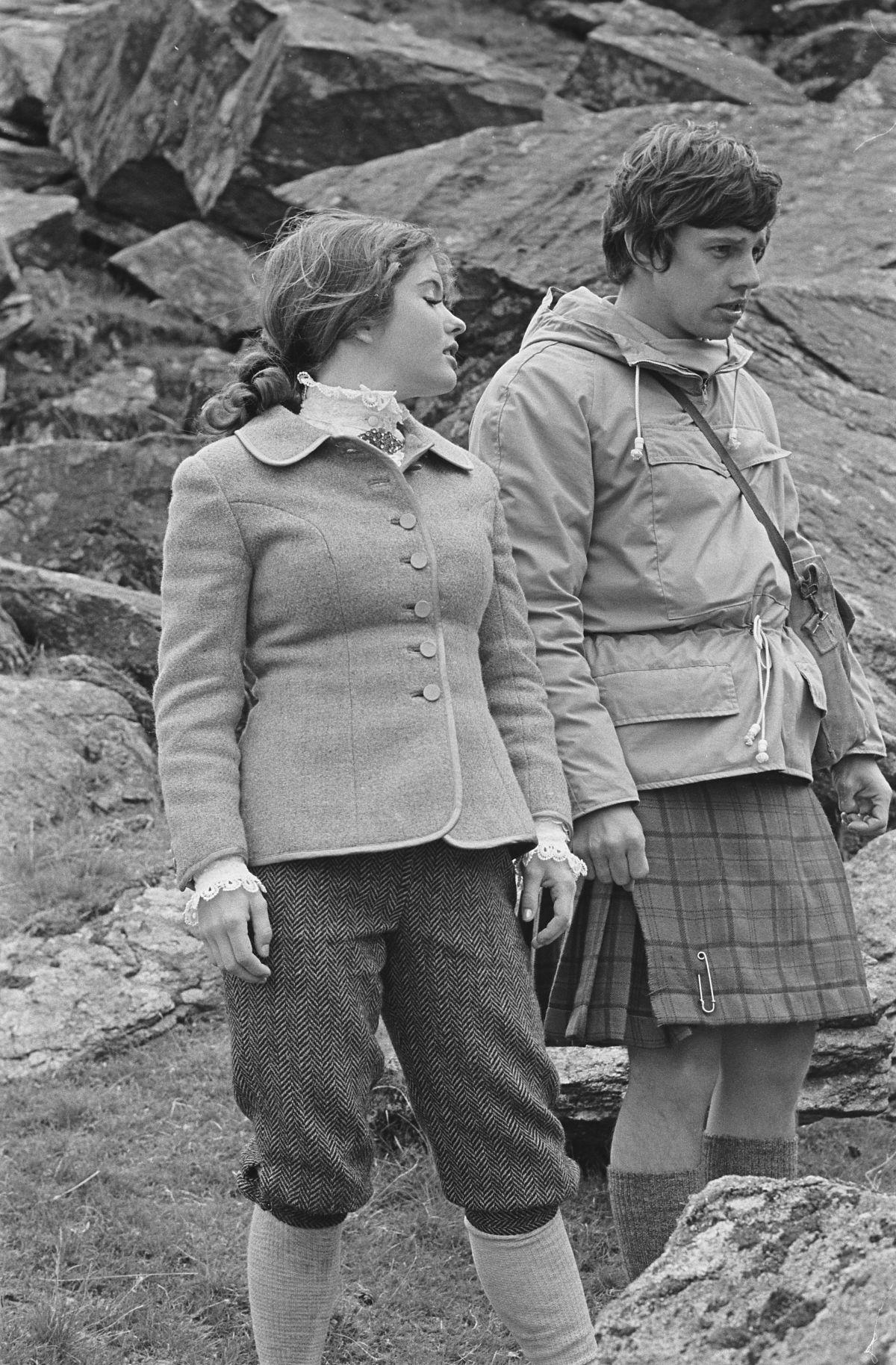
Hines, with Deborah Watling, during the filiming of The Abominable Snowmen

Hines auditioned for the part of Ben Jackson in Doctor Who in 1966 but was unsuccessful. His debut came in the same year, when he was cast to play the part of Jamie McCrimmon, the companion of the Second Doctor (played by Patrick Troughton). Originally intended as a one-off guest character, Jamie joined the regular cast and appeared in the series from 1966 to 1969.

Hines reprised the role in a cameo in the 20th anniversary special "The Five Doctors" (1983) and as a guest star in The Two Doctors (1985). Hines appeared in more episodes than any other "companion" actor in the history of the series, but many of the episodes featuring Jamie no longer exist in the BBC's collection. The only actors to have more credited appearances are the First and the Fourth Doctor.

In 1968, during his third year on the show, Hines released with Major Minor Records the novelty record "Who's Dr. Who?" Esteemed songwriters Barry Mason and Les Reed composed the music and lyrics, but the record was a commercial failure. Hines later called it the only flop Mason and Reed ever wrote.

Hines, Troughton and Wendy Padbury (who played the Second Doctor's other companion, Zoe Heriot) all departed the show in 1969. At the advice of his agent, Hines was the first of the three to announce his intention to leave, though Troughton asked him to stay a few more months to the end of the sixth season, as this was when Troughton planned to relinquish his role as well. The three actors remained with the show until the conclusion of the final serial The War Games (1969). Hines remained in contact with Troughton.

"My agent was advising me to leave. I was going to leave earlier – in fact there was a script written called 'The Laird of Lochinvar'," Hines told SciFiNow. "They were going to go to Scotland and he was going to fall in love with a Highland lass. I remember the Daily Sketch, front page news – JAMIE IS TO LEAVE DOCTOR WHO. Patrick read it and said, 'I'm leaving in six months' time, my contract ends, my wife's been saying I should be doing other stuff, wait for me,' so I stayed on till The War Games and left with Patrick. Then Padders [Wendy Padbury] said, 'I'm not going to stay with Jon Pertwee because I'll never get into shot! He's 6 foot 4 and I'm 4 foot 6!" We didn't want to leave! I still say that if my agent hadn't been nagging me, and [Troughton's] wife, we'd still be there now. You'd have to shoot us to get us out [of] the TARDIS. You'd never have heard of David Tennant or Christopher Eccleston because we'd still be there. We were having such a ball!"

— Hines talking to SciFiNow in 2018.

Author Diana Gabaldon credits watching Hines in The War Games (and finding him attractive in a kilt) as the inspiration for her first novel, Outlander, a time travel story set in 18th century Scotland. Consequently, she named the novel's male protagonist Jamie. She says that the character's surname, Fraser, is a coincidence, as the PBS station on which she watched Doctor Who habitually cut off the episode's credits. She did not learn Hines' name until several years after Outlander was published. In a 2018 interview with SciFiNow, Hines said: "When I was in Emmerdale I got this book, sent by Diana Gabaldon. She explained, saying, 'Dear Frazer, I watched you in this black and white TV show and I loved your legs and your kilt, and I went to church the next day and all I could think about was your legs and your kilt, and I've written this book.' I read it, and I took it to David Cunliffe, who was head of drama at Yorkshire TV. He said it was too expensive, so he didn't do it."

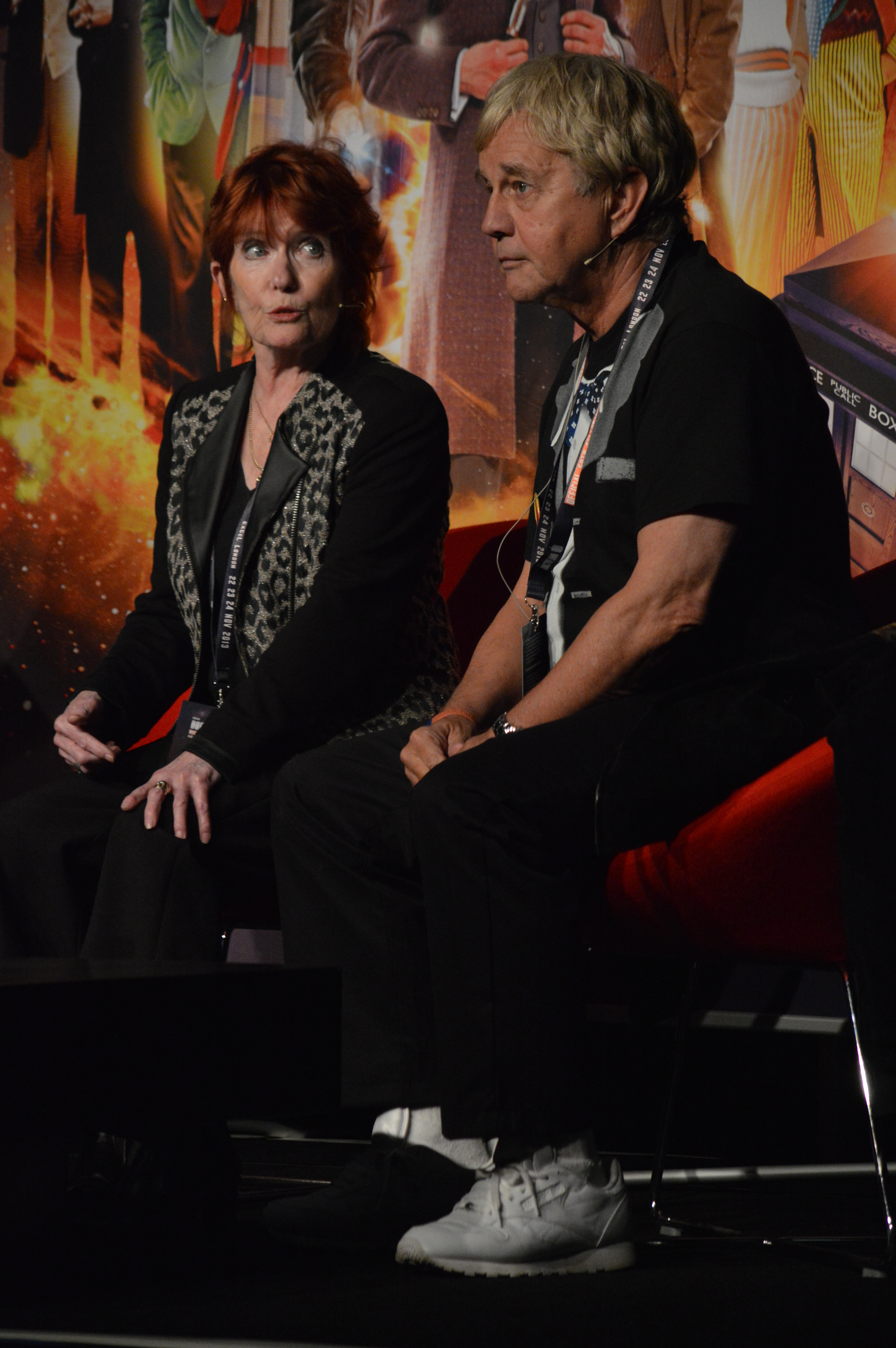
Deborah Watling and Frazer Hines at a Doctor Who 50th Anniversary event

Up until 2007, Hines was the only surviving Second Doctor companion actor not to have acted in a Big Finish Productions Doctor Who audio play. (The others have played characters other than their television roles.) In November 2007, he starred as Jamie in Helicon Prime, the second instalment in Season 2 of Big Finish's Companion Chronicles. Since then he has appeared in many more Companion Chronicles, where his uncanny ability to mimic Patrick Troughton's Second Doctor has been welcomed by fans of the show. Hines has also recorded linking narration for many Second Doctor serials which no longer exist in video form; the soundtracks, along with Hines' narration, have been released on CD by BBC Audio. He also appeared in an audio trilogy with Colin Baker's Sixth Doctor as an older Jamie. In 2013, Hines portrayed both Jamie and the Second Doctor in the Big Finish audio play The Light at the End, produced to celebrate the 50th anniversary of Doctor Who.

In 2023, he reprised his role as Jamie in the series Tales of the TARDIS.

=== Emmerdale ===
After his tenure as Jamie in Doctor Who, Hines appeared in several films such as The Last Valley and Zeppelin (both 1971), until 1972 when he was cast in the soap opera Emmerdale Farm as Joe Sugden, a role he played until 1994. In between making episodes of Emmerdale, as it was renamed in 1989, he has continued a career in the theatre and made occasional appearances in other TV shows. Hines was the subject of This Is Your Life in 1992 after Michael Aspel surprised him during the filming of Emmerdale. He stated in a 2019 interview, "I left Emmerdale because I got sick of going to work when it was dark and coming home when it was dark. I'd just got married and owned a stud farm, and so I said I would leave." He stated he was asked back to the show the following year but refused and was later killed off. Despite his off-screen death, Hines confirmed that he would like to return to the soap.

=== After Emmerdale ===
Straight out of Emmerdale, in 1995 Hines toured the UK in a production of Doctor in the House with Vicki Michelle, Robin Askwith and Windsor Davies. In 1998, he starred as Inspector Lord in a touring production of Spider's Web. That same year, he also presented Out and About and Yorkshire Walks for ITV. Around this time, Hines starred in various touring theatre productions including What the Butler Saw, Dial M for Murder, Wait Until Dark, Absent Friends and Far from the Madding Crowd.

Hines appeared with Kate O'Mara in a tour of The Hollow in 2006, and had a guest role in Dalziel and Pascoe. Hines appeared in Peter Kay's Comic Relief video of 2007, as one of the many guests dancing to the song I'm Gonna Be (500 Miles) by the Proclaimers. In 2011, he toured in the play Five Blue Haired Ladies Sitting on a Green Park Bench with Shirley Anne Field and Anita Harris. In 2014, Hines appeared in the film Two Days in the Smoke. He also appeared as Franklin D. Roosevelt in the stage musical Annie in 2014.

Hines was cast in an episode of the television adaptation of Outlander, which he had helped to inspire. In the May 2015 episode "Wentworth Prison", Hines portrayed Sir Fletcher Gordon, an English prison warden. Hines said: "When it came to pass that they were making a TV series, I said 'I've got to be in it!'. My agent said they were casting for Sir Fletcher Gordon, so I went to see the casting director – it wasn't a given, I had to go and read for the part. I'm glad I did." In 2015, Hines toured the UK in a production of And Then There Were None. From 2016 to 2017, Hines starred as Albert Blunderstone in the tour of the play Seriously Dead.

In 2019, Hines starred in an audio film of Up Pompeii!, celebrating the fiftieth anniversary of the series, appearing alongside original cast members including Madeline Smith and Tim Brooke-Taylor. Hines appeared as Sonny Troughton, a former criminal, in two episodes of Doctors in 2020, and reprised the role in 2024. He then starred in the romantic-comedy film Lost at Christmas set in the Scottish Highlands later that same year. In 2025, Hines guest starred in an episode of Midsomer Murders.

== Personal life ==
Hines has dated Jill Haworth, Pamela Franklin, Susan George, Luan Peters, Liza Goddard and Deborah Watling. He also had a three-year relationship with Michael Caine's daughter Dominique. Hines has been twice married, first to Irish actress Gemma Craven from 1981 to 1984, and second to waterskiing champion Liz Hobbs (with whom he lived in Coddington, Nottinghamshire) from 1991 to 2003.

Hines regularly played for the Showbiz XI football and cricket teams. He also has a passion for horses and spent decades as an amateur jockey, breeding racehorses and participating in country life and equestrian events. Hines has also an owned several stud farms.

Boxtree, an imprint of Macmillan Publishers, published Hines' autobiography in 1996. This work, titled Films, Farms and Fillies, first appeared in a paperback edition. Thirteen years later, in December 2009, Telos Publishing released a revised hardcover edition, titled Hines Sight.

In July 2010, Hines disclosed that he suffered from colorectal cancer for eleven years, explaining that he kept his illness a secret for fear of professional alienation. Since his recovery, Hines has openly promoted cancer awareness through Cancer Research and the Bobby Moore Cancer Foundation. His older brother Roy Hines (1942–1982) was also an actor and died of cancer, aged 40.

Hines is a member of the Grand Order of Water Rats.

== Acting credits ==
=== Film ===
Year	Title	Role	Notes
1955	One Good Turn	Minor role	uncredited
1955	John and Julie	Citizen at Buckingham Palace	uncredited
1955	The Woman for Joe	Minor role	uncredited
1955	Geordie	Minor role	uncredited
1955	Windfall	Minor role	uncredited
1955	Stock Car	Minor role	uncredited
1956	Moby Dick	Boy	uncredited
1956	The Long Arm	Urchin	uncredited
1956	Peril for the Guy	Kim	
1956	X the Unknown	Ian Osborn	
1956	The Weapon	Jimmy	uncredited
1957	The Smallest Show on Earth	Minor role	uncredited
1957	Miracle in Soho	Minor role	uncredited
1957	A King in New York	Chef	
1958	The Salvage Gang	Kim	
1959	A Woman's Temptation	Tommy	
1959	Witness in the Dark	Newsboy	
1960	Tunes of Glory	Minor role	uncredited
1960	The Young Jacobites	Angus	
1963	I Could Go On Singing	Schoolboy	
1964	Go Kart Go	Harry Haggetty	
1967	You Only Live Twice	Spectre Number 4	Voice, uncredited
1971	The Last Valley	Corg	
1971	Zeppelin	Radio Operator	
2013	A Voice to Die For	Quentin Lucas	Short film
2014	The Smoke	Mr Hemmings	
2015	Impurity	Carlson	
2018	Sundown	William	Short film
2018	Blood Corral	Thomas	
2018	Cat Out of the Bag	The Man	Short film
2020	Lost at Christmas	Frank	
2023	Orchid Moon	Eddie Costello	
2026	GOD Tech	Dr. James Sheppard	
2027	T!ts Up!	TBA	Post-production

=== Television ===
Year	Title	Role	Notes
1955	London Playhouse	Mickey Day	Episode: "Fighting Chance"
1957	Huntingtower	Napoleon	All 6 episodes
1957	Overseas Press Club - Exclusive!	Bellhop	Episode: "The Littlest Sergeant"
1957–1958	The Silver Sword	Jan	5 episodes
1958	Run to Earth	Mick Fairbairn	5 episodes
1958	Queen's Champion	Toby	All 8 episodes
1958	Mary Britten, M.D.	Geoff Bates	Episode: "The Doctor in the Dark"
1958	Cinderella	Buttons	TV film
1958	The Adventures of William Tell	Carl	Episod: "The Boy Slaves"
1959	BBC Sunday-Night Theatre	Donald	Episode: "Proud Passage"
1959	Great Expectations	Trabb's Boy	Episode 5
1959	Heidi	Organ-grinder	Episode: "Away from Grandfather"
1959	The Case Before You	Peter Houghton	Episode 5
1959	Three Golden Nobles	Tom	Episode: "The Painter's Apprentice"
1959	The Men from Room 13	Hooligan	Episode: "The Man Who Watched Birds: Part 1"
1960	The Long Way Home	Philippe Rondeur	Episode: "Cross Country Run"
1960	Rendezvous	Bully	Episode: "The Dodo"
1960	No Man's Island	Tim	2 episodes
1960	Armchair Theatre	Perce	Episode: "Mr Nobody"
1960	Yorky	Phil Grundy	Episode: "A Change of Tune"
1960	ITV Television Playhouse	Landlady's Son	Episode: "The Song of Louise in the Morning"
1960	Play of the Week	Barney MacKean	Episode: "The Member of the Wedding"
1960	The Charlie Drake Show	Nicholas Nickleby	Episode: "A Christmas Carol"
1961	The Cheaters	Harry	Episode: "The Man with the Ticking Head"
1961	Dear Charles	Bruno	TV film
1961	ITV Television Playhouse	Leonard Scott	Episode: "Paris Round the Corner"
1961	Yorky	Jimmy	Episode: "The Student Teacher"
1961	Family Solicitor	David Lee	Episode: "In Custody"
1961	Play of the Week	Ephraim	Episode: "Over the Bridge"
1961	Play of the Week	Young Boy	Episode: "The Whisperers"
1962	Late Summer Affair	Youth	TV film
1962	Suspense	Fred Markham	Episode: "Needle Point"
1962	Dr. Finlay's Casebook	Robbie Grant	Episode: "The Quack"
1962	Probation Officer	Tom Harvey	Episode #4.19
1962	Z-Cars	First Boy	Episode: "The Five Whistles"
1963	The Plane Makers	Bob Millett	Episode: "You Can't Beat the System"
1963	Suspense	Billy Johnson	Episode: "The Honest Man"
1963	The Plane Makers	Apprentice	Episode: "Lover Come Back"
1963	Smugglers' Cove	Tim	All 6 episodes
1963	Play of the Week	Noisy Boy	Episode: "I Can't Bear Violence"
1963–1964	Emergency Ward 10	Tim Birch	14 episodes
1964	Television Club	Tony Brent	Episode: "The Brent Family: A Youth Hostel Weekend"
1964	Compact	Ray	4 episodes
1964	Smuggler's Bay	John Trenchard	All 6 episodes
1964	The Old Wives' Tale	Cyril	2 episodes
1965	The Airbase	Farmer's Son	Episode: "Crewcuts Among the Cowslips"
1965	The Villains	Sonny	Episode: "Sonny"
1965	Coronation Street	Roger Wain	3 episodes
1965	The Flying Swan	Jonathan Steele	Episode: "The Age of Consent"
1965	Theatre 625	Peter	Episode: "The Siege of Manchester"
1965	Play of the Week	Andy	Episode: "Giants on Saturday"
1966	This Man Craig	Keith Mitchell	Episode: "Sticks and Stones"
1966	This Man Craig	Carew	Episode: "Swimmer in a Shallow Cup"
1966	King of the River	Bob Elliot	4 episodes
1966	Play of the Week	John	Episode: "Samson and Delilah"
1966–1969, 1983, 1985	Doctor Who	Jamie McCrimmon	116 episodes
1967	Play of the Week	Man on Motor Bike	Episode: "Cry Baby Bunting"
1971	Rules, Rules, Rules	Alan	Episode: "Rules and the Generation Gap"
1971	Seasons of the Year	Jethro	Episode: "The Three Graces"
1972	Jack in a Box	Jack Murdoch	TV film
1972–1994	Emmerdale	Joe Sugden	Series regular; 1515 episodes
1984	Duty Free	Frazer Hines	Episode: "El Astro"
1996	Expert Witness	Michael Kyte	Episode: "The Answer’s in the Soil"
1997–1998	Out of Sight	Mr. Spinks	3 episodes
2006	Dalziel and Pascoe	Duncan Ramsden	Episode: "Glory Days: Part 1"
2007	The Catherine Tate Show	Frazer Hines	Episode: "Comic Relief Special"
2008	Panto the Series	Baron	TV film
2015	Outlander	Sir Fletcher Gordon	Episode: "Wentworth Prison"
2020, 2024	Doctors	Sonny Troughton	3 episodes
2023	Tales of the TARDIS	Jamie McCrimmon	Episode: "The Mind Robber"
2025	Midsomer Murders	Wilf Worrell	Episode: "Lawn of the Dead"

=== Music videos ===
Year	Artist	Title	Role
2015	Linzi Gold	"Killing Kiss"	Barman

=== Selected Theatre ===
Year	Title	Role	Venue
1956	The Good Woman of Setzuan	Boy	Royal Court Theatre, London
1958	Honour Bright		Theatre Royal, Newcastle
1963	Norman	Gordon	UK Tour
1965	Heirs and Graces	Karl	UK Tour
1970	No Trams to Lime Street	Taff	London Tour
1971	Doctor in the House		Adeline Grenee Theatre, East Grinstead
1980	Happy Birthday	Robert	UK Tour
1983	Boeing-Boeing	Robert	UK Tour
1984	On the Razzle	Weinberl	Pitlochry Festival Theatre
1985	Doctor in the House		UK Tour
1985	Jack and the Beanstalk	Simple Simon	Pantomime; Civic Theatre, Halifax
1991	Cinderella	Buttons	Pantomime; Theatre Royal, Lincoln
1994	Not Now, Darling	Crouch	Bournemouth
1995	Doctor in the House		UK Tour
1995	Run for Your Wife		UK Tour
1998	Spider's Web	Inspector Lord	UK Tour
1998	What the Butler Saw	Doctor Prentice	UK Tour
1999	Run for Your Wife	John Smith	Pier Theatre, Bournemouth
2000	Dial M for Murder	Inspector Hubbard	UK Tour
2000-2001	Cinderella	Buttons	Pantomime; Telford Theatre, Telford
2001	Wait Until Dark	Croker	UK Tour
2002	Suddenly At Home	Sam Blaine	Theatre Royal, Windsor
2002	Absent Friends	Colin	UK Tour
2003	Anyone for Murder?		UK Tour
2003	Far from the Madding Crowd	Mr Boldwood	Brewery Art Centre, Kendal
2004	Outside Edge	Dennis	UK Tour
2005	Caught in the Net		The Mill at Sonning
2006	The Hollow	Inspector	UK Tour
2007	The Unexpected Guest	Inspector Thomas	UK Tour
2008	See How They Run	Sergeant Towers	UK Tour
2011	Five Blue Haired Ladies; Sitting On A Green Park Bench	Richard	UK Tour
2014	Annie	Franklin D. Roosevelt	St James Theatre, Wellington, NZ
2015	And Then There Were None	Rogers	UK Tour
2016	Seriously Dead	Albert Blunderstone	UK Tour
2019	Up Pompeii!	Senator Ludicrus Sextus	Shaw Theatre, London
2023	Cinderella in Benidorm	Dandini	Benidorm, Spain
