= The Pandorica Opens =

Episode of Doctor Who

212a – "The Pandorica Opens"
- Doctor Who episode
- Auton legionaries leading The Doctor towards the Pandorica as part of the alliance's plan to imprison him. This scene featured the then-largest assembly of different monsters in the show's history.

Cast
- Doctor: Matt Smith – Eleventh Doctor
- Companions: Karen Gillan – Amy Pond; Arthur Darvill – Rory Williams
- Others: Alex Kingston – River Song; Tony Curran – Vincent van Gogh; Bill Paterson – Bracewell; Ian McNeice – Winston Churchill; Sophie Okonedo – Liz Ten; Marcus O'Donovan – Claudio; Clive Wood – Commander; Christopher Ryan – Commander Stark; Ruari Mears – Cyber Leader; Paul Kasey – Judoon; Howard Lee – Doctor Gachet; Barnaby Edwards – Dalek; Simon Fisher-Becker – Dorium; Joe Jacobs – Guard; Chrissie Cotterill – Madame Vernet; David Fynn – Marcellus

Production
- Directed by: Toby Haynes
- Written by: Steven Moffat
- Produced by: Peter Bennett
- Executive producers: Steven Moffat; Piers Wenger; Beth Willis
- Music by: Murray Gold
- Production code: 1.12
- Series: Series 5
- Running time: 1st of 2-part story, 50 minutes
- First broadcast: 19 June 2010

Chronology
← Preceded by "The Lodger"	Followed by → "The Big Bang"

"The Pandorica Opens" is the twelfth episode of the fifth series of British science fiction television programme Doctor Who, first broadcast on 19 June 2010 on BBC One. It is the first in a two-part finale; the second part, "The Big Bang", aired on 26 June. The episode was written by head writer and executive producer Steven Moffat and directed by Toby Haynes.

In the episode, the time-travelling archaeologist River Song (Alex Kingston) summons alien time traveller the Doctor (Matt Smith) and his companion Amy Pond (Karen Gillan) to Roman Britain in 102 AD, where underneath Stonehenge lies a fabled prison called the Pandorica that legend tells holds the most fearsome being in the whole universe. However, it is discovered that the Doctor has been put in a trap by an alliance of his greatest enemies to save the universe from cracks in time that were caused by the Doctor's space-time vessel the TARDIS. Amy's fiancé, Rory (Arthur Darvill), who had previously been erased from existence from one of the cracks in the universe, makes a return, though he is revealed to be an Auton duplicate outfitted with his consciousness.

Moffat wanted the episode to be "big" and "mad". Filming was done at the real Stonehenge and at a replica in early February 2010. The "Underhenge" set was the largest built on Upper Boat Studios and Haynes helped get the actors into the mood by playing music from the Indiana Jones franchise. The alliance of enemies was the first time such an assembly had been seen in the show, and the production team made sure they used the most iconic monsters that they had in good condition. "The Pandorica Opens" was seen by 7.57 million viewers in the UK and received an Appreciation Index of 88. The episode was well-received by critics and the two-part story won the 2011 Hugo Award for Best Dramatic Presentation (Short Form).

== Plot ==
=== Synopsis ===
The Eleventh Doctor and Amy, following a message from River Song, arrive in Roman Britain in 102 AD. River shows the Doctor a Vincent van Gogh painting she recovered titled The Pandorica Opens, which depicts the TARDIS exploding. The Doctor realises the Pandorica, a fabled prison for the universe's deadliest being, must be stored in a memorable location near the coordinates: Stonehenge.

Beneath Stonehenge, the Doctor, Amy, and River find the Pandorica. While examining the Pandorica, Amy confronts the Doctor about an engagement ring she had previously found in the pocket of his jacket and feels a strong emotional attachment to. (Note: As depicted in the 2010 episode "The Lodger") River warns the Doctor that "everything that ever hated [him]" is being drawn to the Pandorica. The Doctor is aided by a volunteer group of Roman legionaries; the centurion in charge of them is Amy's fiancé, Rory. Neither Rory nor the Doctor can explain Rory's presence, as he was consumed by a crack in the universe and erased from existence. (Note: As depicted in the 2010 episode "Cold Blood")

The Doctor urges River to bring the TARDIS to Stonehenge while he, Amy, Rory, and the legionaries prepare. When River tries to use the TARDIS, an outside force takes control of it and pilots it to Amy's house in the present day, which has been broken into. In Amy's room, River finds a story book about Pandora's box and a children's book about Roman Britain. River communicates this to the Doctor, warning him that the Pandorica must be a trap, created out of Amy's memories. Realising that River is at the onset of the time energy explosion that caused the cracks in the universe, the Doctor warns her to leave immediately, but she finds herself again trapped in the TARDIS as the central control console begins to go critical.

Back at Stonehenge, the Doctor discovers that the volunteer legionaries, including Rory, are Autons, and he is quickly captured as his other orbiting foes materialise around him. Above ground, as Rory fights to retain his human identity, Amy suddenly remembers him, but as his Auton identity emerges he fatally shoots Amy. The Doctor's captors reveal that they have formed an alliance to imprison him in the Pandorica. Knowing the TARDIS exploding would cause the cracks destroying reality, they believe only the Doctor can operate the TARDIS, and thus removing him will prevent the explosion. As the Doctor is sealed inside the Pandorica, every star in the sky goes supernova.

=== Continuity ===
In the first episode of the series, "The Eleventh Hour", Prisoner Zero tells the Doctor, "The universe is cracked. The Pandorica will open. Silence will fall". The Pandorica was also mentioned by River in "Flesh and Stone" as the next time she would meet him, and the Doctor dismissed the Pandorica as a fairy tale. In River's timeline this takes place before "The Time of Angels"/"Flesh and Stone". The painting of the TARDIS explosion passes through several characters from previous episodes: the painting is created by Vincent van Gogh (Tony Curran) after his meeting with the Doctor ("Vincent and the Doctor"). The painting is found in 1941 by Winston Churchill (Ian McNeice) and Professor Bracewell (Bill Paterson) from "Victory of the Daleks", and River steals the painting from Liz 10 (Sophie Okonedo), who previously appeared in "The Beast Below". The recurring phrase "silence will fall" came to a head in the next series with the introduction of the alien species and organisation of the Silence.

== Production ==
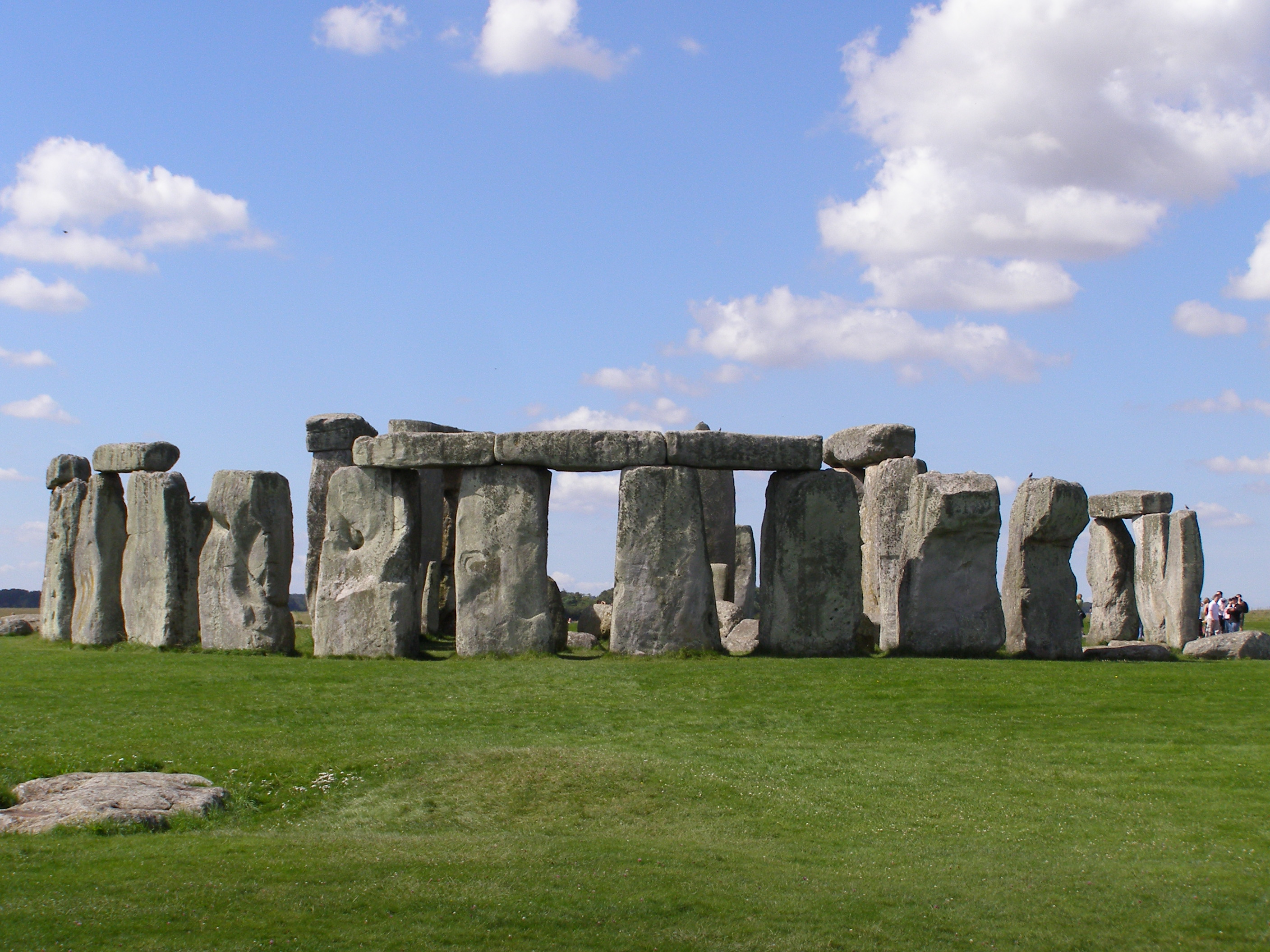
Some scenes were filmed at the real Stonehenge in Wiltshire, while others were filmed using a replica.

The read-through for "The Pandorica Opens" took place on 13 January 2010 in the Upper Boat Studios. It began later than planned as cold weather delayed the arrival of some of the cast and crew. The episode was filmed in the sixth production block along with "The Big Bang". Half of the scene with Liz 10 (Sophie Okonedo) was filmed in advance on 22 October 2009 along with scenes of "The Beast Below" at an orangery at Margam Country Park, Port Talbot. The other half, featuring Alex Kingston as River Song, was filmed 5 February 2010.

Showrunner and episode writer Steven Moffat wanted the episode to be "big" and say that "we are turning it up to a level, we are really going mad with it". Atmospheric lighting was added by director of photography Stephan Pehrsson, who wanted to give it a movie feel. Moffat chose Stonehenge as the primary location for the episode because the monument was large and important enough to be suitable for the fall of someone as powerful as the Doctor. Filming was done at the real Stonehenge in Wiltshire on the night of 2 February 2010. The cast and crew had to abide by regulations; they were not allowed to touch the stones, bring heavy equipment in, and the lighting had to be done from the floor. They could only afford to shoot during one night and spent the only hour of daylight in the morning shooting a three-minute dialogue sequence. This proved to be a challenge, as it typically took an hour and a half to film similar scenes. The rest of the scenes set at Stonehenge were filmed with a lightweight replica set up in Margam Country Park called "Foamhenge" over four nights. Director Toby Haynes thought that they had "established" Stonehenge at the real site and now could get away with seeing less of it. The Doctor's speech to the alien spaceships was filmed 3 February, while Rory shooting Amy was shot on 4 February. The weather conditions were very cold with wind and rain which caused difficulties as it was hard to communicate over the wind. Haynes wanted the Doctor's speech to be his "big, pop-star moment" and to look as if he was addressing a large site such as Wembley Stadium.

The "Underhenge" set was the largest built in the Upper Boat Studios. Haynes wanted the chamber to look "dark" and "physical", and the art department added cobwebs and stones. As the chamber was supposed to be underground and thus there was no natural light to light the actors' faces, Haynes decided to utilise gas-fed flaming torches as the source of light; Gillan was initially nervous about working with the torches and struggled with them. The script referred to it as similar to a temple found in Indiana Jones, and Haynes actually played music from Raiders of the Lost Ark composed by John Williams to help the actors slow down as they explored the set. Haynes believed this would emphasise the awe in the scene as well as the "ghostly" and "haunted" feeling of the chamber. Gillan stated that she found the music very useful.

For the scene in which the Doctor, Amy, and River are riding on horses, the close-ups of the characters riding were filmed by having the actors sit on a saddle mounted on the back of a truck and act like they were riding horses. Gillan called this the "strangest thing" she had ever done, and was sure she "looked ridiculous". They were filmed performing this as the truck drove to achieve the effect of the passing country. Wide shots were taken of stunt doubles of the three actors riding real horses. This scene was filmed on 1 February 2010.

At the episode's conclusion an alliance of many of the Doctor's enemies appear, including the Daleks, Cybermen, Sontarans, Judoon, Autons, Sycorax, Hoix, Silurians, and Roboforms. The Pandorica Alliance was made up of the "very best" costumes and props they still had in good condition and of the most iconic monsters. So many enemies standing side-by-side had never been seen in the show before. The episode also features Amy battling a Cyberman; Gillan stated she "really wanted" to work with the iconic monster. As the Cyberman had been guarding the Pandorica for a long time, Haynes wanted to make it look "rusted, creaky, and old" and compared its behavior to Frankenstein. The Cyberman was originally played by an amputee with one arm, but the production team was dissatisfied with the camera angle and decided to reshoot the scene from a different angle, but a different actor who had both arms did the part as the amputee was unavailable. A simple solution was devised to cover his arm with a green sleeve made of the same material as a greenscreen, and the final sequence is a combination of both shots. The Cyberman is killed by Rory, who is unaware he is an Auton; this was meant to signify that there was something different about Rory, as he would have normally panicked in that situation. At the end of the episode Rory is overcome by the Nestene Consciousness's control and shoots Amy, which reflected Moffat's belief that all good love stories end in tragedy.

== Broadcast and reception ==
"The Pandorica Opens" was first broadcast in the United Kingdom on BBC One and simulcast on BBC HD on 19 June 2010. For the first time in the series, the episode was not followed by a short trailer for the next episode, the finale. Initial overnight ratings showed that 5.38 million viewers had watched the episode on BBC One, while a further 497,000 watched on BBC HD, combining for a total of 5.88 million. Final consolidated figures showed a total of 7.57 million viewers, with 6.94 million on BBC One and 635,000 on BBC HD. The episode was given an "excellent" Appreciation Index of 88, higher than the previous episodes of series 5 and second highest for that series, after the final episode, which scored 89.

"The Pandorica Opens" was released in Region 2 on DVD and Blu-ray on 6 September 2010 with "Vincent and the Doctor", "The Lodger" and "The Big Bang". It was then re-released as part of the Complete Fifth Series boxset on 8 November 2011.

=== Critical reception ===
"The Pandorica Opens" received positive reviews. Dan Martin of The Guardian praised the cinematic scope and cliffhanger, calling it "the most audacious of showstoppers". He thought that so much happened in the episode that Rory's return felt like "a minor plot point", though he believed that to be because the audience knew it was going to happen. Gavin Fuller, writing for The Daily Telegraph, praised it for bringing an "epic, cinematic tale to stick in the memory" that the series had "arguably lacked", though he thought the assembly of the Alliance was "rather fanboyish on Moffat's part". He also praised Smith for "hit[ting] the right note" and the revelations at the end for being "genuinely shocking". Like Martin, he said that Rory's return was "unsurprising", though "well-handled" and with some touching moments between him and Amy.

Patrick Mulkern of Radio Times called it "perhaps the most epic, salivating Doctor Who ever" and praised the four leads and Moffat for "packing in surprises and slotting together the season puzzle with a dazzling plot, urgent pace and terrific dialogue". IGN's Matt Wales rated the episode 9 out of 10, saying it "managed to pack in an absurd number of standout moments" and was "beautifully delivered, if not quite as satisfying as other two-part openers thanks to its wilful evasiveness". However, he thought that the slow-motion ending "dipped a little too violently into melodrama", though it was "hard to fault that bravado downbeat cliffhanger".

SFX magazine's Richard Edwards awarded the episode five out of five stars, praising the "delicious twist", "great character stuff", and "touching scenes" between Amy and Rory. He thought that the Alliance was "unlikely" but it worked because the series arc had been "cleverly constructed". Sam McPherson of Zap2it gave it an A+, praising it for being an improvement upon the finales of previous series. He also thought the use of the Alliance was well done, as it portrayed them as being more misguided than evil. The A.V. Club's Keith Phipps gave the episode an A−, though expressed concern whether the conclusion would be able to satisfy the set-up.

"The Pandorica Opens", along with its conclusion, was awarded the 2011 Hugo Award for Best Dramatic Presentation (Short Form). This was the fifth time Doctor Who has won the award, and the fourth time a Steven Moffat episode had won. The Mill, Doctor Who's computer-generated effects team, won a Royal Television Society Craft and Design Award for its work on the episode.
