= The Hawk Chronicles =

Science fiction radio drama

- Other names: Hawk Chronicles: The Adventures of Kate Hawk
- Genre: Science fiction; Detective; Action/adventure
- Running time: 23 minutes Approx.
- Country of origin: United States
- Language: English
- Home station: WCEM 1240 AM WERA-LP 96.7 FM WHCP-FM 91.7 FM
- Starring: Kirsten Strohmer; Susan Morgan; Steve Long; Jon Macinta; Skip Windsor; Gary Crouch; Simon Fisher-Becker
- Announcer: Steve Long
- Created by: Steve Long
- Produced by: Steve Long
- Narrated by: Kirsten Strohmer (Episode 1–81) Susan Morgan to present
- Original release: March 2015 – present
- No. of episodes: 300 as of January 2025
- Audio format: 48,000 Stereo 16-bit converted to MP3 for internet and radio
- Website: hawkchronicles.com

The Hawk Chronicles (also known as Hawk Chronicles: The Adventures of Kate Hawk) is a science fiction radio drama series produced and written by creator Steve Long. The series began airing on WCEM 1240 AM in 2015. It follows "the adventures of Detective Kate Hawk, who went from [being] a Baltimore police detective to intergalactic investigator." Described as "a hard science-based sci-fi adventure," the show is set in modern-day and takes place on Earth, in space, and on alien planets. It initially focused almost exclusively on Kate Hawk and her adventures as a police investigator who moonlighted in space, but it has expanded its scope to follow other characters and plotlines in a soap opera-like format.

== Plot ==
In Episode One, Detectives Kate Hawk and Jim Barnes of Baltimore's Special Investigations Section are dispatched to Little Italy, where Kate discovers that what appears to be a displaced monument from her hometown of Cambridge, MD, is really an interdimensional craft. She meets members of a parallel Earth's Intergalactic Defense Force (IDF), who recruit her as one of their agents. At first, Kate handles terrestrial missions for the IDF, but eventually she and her partner Barnes go "from fighting crime in the streets to crime in the stars." Their principal antagonists are Supreme Controller Lyster and Lord Zokar of the extremist group Rebels Against the Galactic Empire (RAGE).

=== Narrative notes ===
Kate Hawk was originally played by Kirsten Strohmer, who left for professional reasons. In Episode 81, Kate is caught in a devastating explosion on a spaceship and requires major facial reconstructive surgery and a new larynx. The character has been voiced by Susan Morgan since Episode 101.

== History ==
=== Development ===
When Kirsten Strohmer told her co-worker at Cambridge's WCEM-AM (1240) that she was looking for more voice acting work, Steve Long created a project just for her. It became a space-adventure podcast called The Hawk Chronicles, to star Strohmer as Baltimore police detective Kate Hawk, who would go "traipsing through the galaxy, in pursuit of alien no-goodniks of all stripes." Strohmer described it as "a cross between Castle and Doctor Who."

=== Casting ===
For the other voice actors, Long called on acquaintances and friends he knew through the Doctor Who-themed photo booth he ran at sci-fi conventions. As the show progressed, people from around the U.S. as well as from Norway, Sweden, Great Britain, South Africa, Australia and the Philippines joined the cast.

=== Production ===
Producer Long pens all of the stories himself, drawing inspiration from the BBC TV show Doctor Who, and including allusions to other famous genre fiction. Technical consultants read the scripts "to verify continuity and scientific feasibility" before they are emailed out to actors. The voice artists record their parts individually at sound studios, using home mic setups, or even on their smart phones, and send in the audio files. In his home studio, Long mixes the voices together, along with sound effects and music, sometimes including elements he collected with his own digital recorder.

"It's a fun show to put together, but it can also be very frustrating," Long has said. Directorless actors occasionally mispronounce names and overstretch deadlines.

=== Music and sound ===
All music heard in the show is created in Sonicfire Pro 5 and Band in a Box. Most of the sound effects were captured on a handheld digital recorder or came from a collection of royalty-free effects.

=== Broadcast ===
After Long had recorded 16 episodes, his former employer, MTS Broadcasting, wanted The Hawk Chronicles for an introduction to the program "When Radio Was." The twelve-minute serial debuted on WCEM 1240 AM out of Cambridge in May 2015, airing Fridays at 12:30pm.

In June 2016, the show began airing from Episode One on the Arlington, Va, station WERA-LP 96.7 FM at 2:30pm on Sundays as a two-part, 26-minute program. The first segment featured discussion and interviews with specialists in writing, acting, science, police work, medicine, and other fields. The second segment was the scripted adventure.

In March 2018, The Hawk Chronicles moved from WCEM to WHCP-LP 101.5 FM, (now WHCP-FM 97.1) also in Cambridge, where it still airs on Sunday morning at 6 a.m.

From Episode 1 through Episode 40, the length of the weekly installments averaged 12 minutes. From Episode 57, all but two installments have been over 20 minutes long. As of March 2022, 177 episodes, plus the unnumbered "A Hawk Chronicles Christmas," had aired. The episodes also are available for streaming and download online at Apple Podcasts, Spreaker, Spotify, iHeartRadio, Google Podcasts, Castbox, Deezer, and Podcast Addict.

=== Reception ===
The Hawk Chronicles was recognized as one of Baltimore Magazine's Ten Best Podcasts of 2015. It received Audio Verse Awards nominations in 2017, 2018, and 2019, and was nominated for Best Podcast in the 2016 Geekie Awards.

A Reddit reviewer said in March 2018 that this "obscure" audio drama deserved more listeners because it is rare "to find a genre show that has gone for so long and consistently avoids idiot ball actions by the villains or the heroes or problem-dissolving Deus ex machinas."

=== Ratings ===
As of March 2023 there were 58,000 downloads of the program according to Spreaker.com. This figure does not include listens from the show's website, or the audience for the radio broadcasts.

== Cast ==
- Kirsten Strohmer as Agent Kate Hawk and others (Episode 1–81)
- Susan Morgan as Agent Kate Hawk (Episode 101–present)
- Steve Long as Agent Jim Barnes / Von Langer / Wilson / Mission Control, others
- Gary Crouch as Special Agent Horace Hawk / Lord Zokar ("WiFi")
- Skip Windsor as Off. Vivian Nelson / Lord Lyster
- Jon Macinta as John Pearman / Controller / Det. Mack / Robo4, others
- Chris Weissenborn as Capt. Nate
- Kristen Merritt as Kelly Hawk Merritt (Episode 1-110)
- Emilie Knud-Hansen as Kelly Hawk Merritt (Episode 112-present)
- Alexander Nilsen as Soren Hansen / Vlad / Professor Lin, others
- Simon Fisher-Becker as Agent Tony Simon / Dracmar
- Richard Starling as Det. Hernandez / Mondu, others
- Gerard O'Brien as Jake Holliday / Dimitri Karloff / Sam the Hongan
- Tyler Butler as Rick Rogers / Gagliastri, others
- Clive Ward as Jaffra / Director Cage
- Tracey Wickersham as Det. Tracy Richards, others
- Stephanie Kline as Lenora
- Jessica Quinn as Ginger
- Deanna D. Parker as Capt. McCall
- Tammy Fields as Capt. Tam Fielder
- Claudia Fahey as Gabby / Ship's computer
- Tony Dugdale as Brady / Major Dunn / Dimitri, others
- Chase Merritt as Jocko
- Bernie Dryden as Det. Farnsworth
- Chris Farley as Tesla
- Maury Stanley as Pennypacker
- Frank Stout as Major Whitt
- Richard Story as Carlos / Det. Jocko, others
- Amanda Guzman Reese as Bella, others
- Maddy Crouch as Teka / Ship's computer
- Bruce McWilliams as Commander Simms
- Fred Poole as Jeremy Parks
- Wayne Pierce as Det. Garrett
- Joseph McGrail as JoMac
- Thomas Ward as Col. Rada / Jamison
- Ron Dowd as Marko, others
- Stephen Herczeg as Simmons, others
- Garret Macinta as Col. Corsky, others
- Victoria Perusse as Scarlett Jernigan
- P. Ryan Anthony as David Thornton / Hank the Hongan, others

Also: Ulysses Campbell, Andrew Todd, B.J. Wheatley, Matt Phillips, Cynthia Long Windsor, Lauren Greenhawk, Owen Strohmer, Laura Poole, David Coe, Pamela Coe, Fredrik Bourdette, Mary Allewalt, Lee Reece, Troy Hill, Lyn Vinson, Jessica Nilsen, Amanda Larsson, Raymone Rayburn, Claire Merritt, Renee Silva, Matt Fahey, David Greer, Laura Todd, Travis Todd, Lyn Hopkins, Martin Hopkins, Jeanette Rayburn, Robert Coe, Ann Robinson, Sunday Kaminski, Samuel Pomerantz, Tom Yates, Susan Long, Kathy Stanfield, Jacquelin O'Neal, Amanda Fox, David Cannel, Elizabeth Randall, Heather Sharp, Jenny Steel, Deana Long Karpavage, Tracey Johns, Joshua Perusse, Matthew Bartram, Sue Lake-Harris
