= The Beast Below =

2010 episode of Doctor Who

204 – "The Beast Below"
- Doctor Who episode

Cast
- Doctor: Matt Smith – Eleventh Doctor
- Companion: Karen Gillan – Amy Pond
- Others: Sophie Okonedo – Liz 10; Terrence Hardiman – Hawthorne; Hannah Sharp – Mandy; Alfie Field – Timmy; Christopher Good – Morgan; David Ajala – Peter; Catrin Richards – Poem Girl; Jonathan Battersby – Winder; Chris Porter – Voice of Smilers/Winder; Ian McNeice – Churchill

Production
- Directed by: Andrew Gunn
- Written by: Steven Moffat
- Produced by: Peter Bennett
- Executive producers: Steven Moffat; Piers Wenger; Beth Willis
- Music by: Murray Gold
- Production code: 1.2
- Series: Series 5
- Running time: 45 minutes
- First broadcast: 10 April 2010

Chronology
← Preceded by "The Eleventh Hour"	Followed by → "Victory of the Daleks"

"The Beast Below" is the second episode of the fifth series of the British science fiction television programme Doctor Who. It was written by executive producer and head writer Steven Moffat and broadcast on BBC One and BBC HD on 10 April 2010.

In the episode, the Eleventh Doctor—a time travelling alien played by Matt Smith—and his new companion Amy Pond (Karen Gillan) arrive in the distant future aboard the Starship UK, a ship constructed to transport the population and major cultural artefacts of the United Kingdom (apart from Scotland) away from Earth to escape the deadly solar flares that made Earth uninhabitable. However, they discover that the government of the ship secretly tortures a Star Whale that guides the ship, the abandonment of which is believed will destroy the ship and kill everyone on board.

The episode, which featured the first time Amy was away from her home world, was designed to show how important she was to the Doctor and his need for a companion. As part of the second production block of the series, the episode's production took place in Autumn 2009. "The Beast Below" was seen by 8.42 million viewers on BBC One and BBC HD, the fifth most-watched programme in the week it was broadcast. It was met with a generally positive reception from critics; many praised the chemistry between Smith and Gillan, but some thought that there were too many imaginative concepts that did not make a satisfying conclusion, or that the message of the episode was not as strong as it should have been.

== Plot ==
=== Synopsis ===
The Eleventh Doctor and Amy arrive on Starship UK, a colony ship in the future which the population of the United Kingdom (sans Scotland) evacuated in to escape deadly solar flares. Amy is taken by the monk-like Winders to one of many voting booths set up on the ship when she investigates a hole containing a tentacled creature. She is shown a video about the truth of Starship UK, and then asked if she wants to protest the truth or forget it, the latter causing her short-term memory to be wiped. Amy chooses to forget, and creates a video to herself to prevent the Doctor from learning the truth, before the mind wipe. The Doctor is curious as to what "protest" will cause and activates it, sending him and Amy into the maw of a giant creature below the ship. The Doctor induces the creature to vomit, allowing them to escape back to the ship. The Doctor and Amy meet Queen Elizabeth X, known as Liz 10, the ruler of the ship.

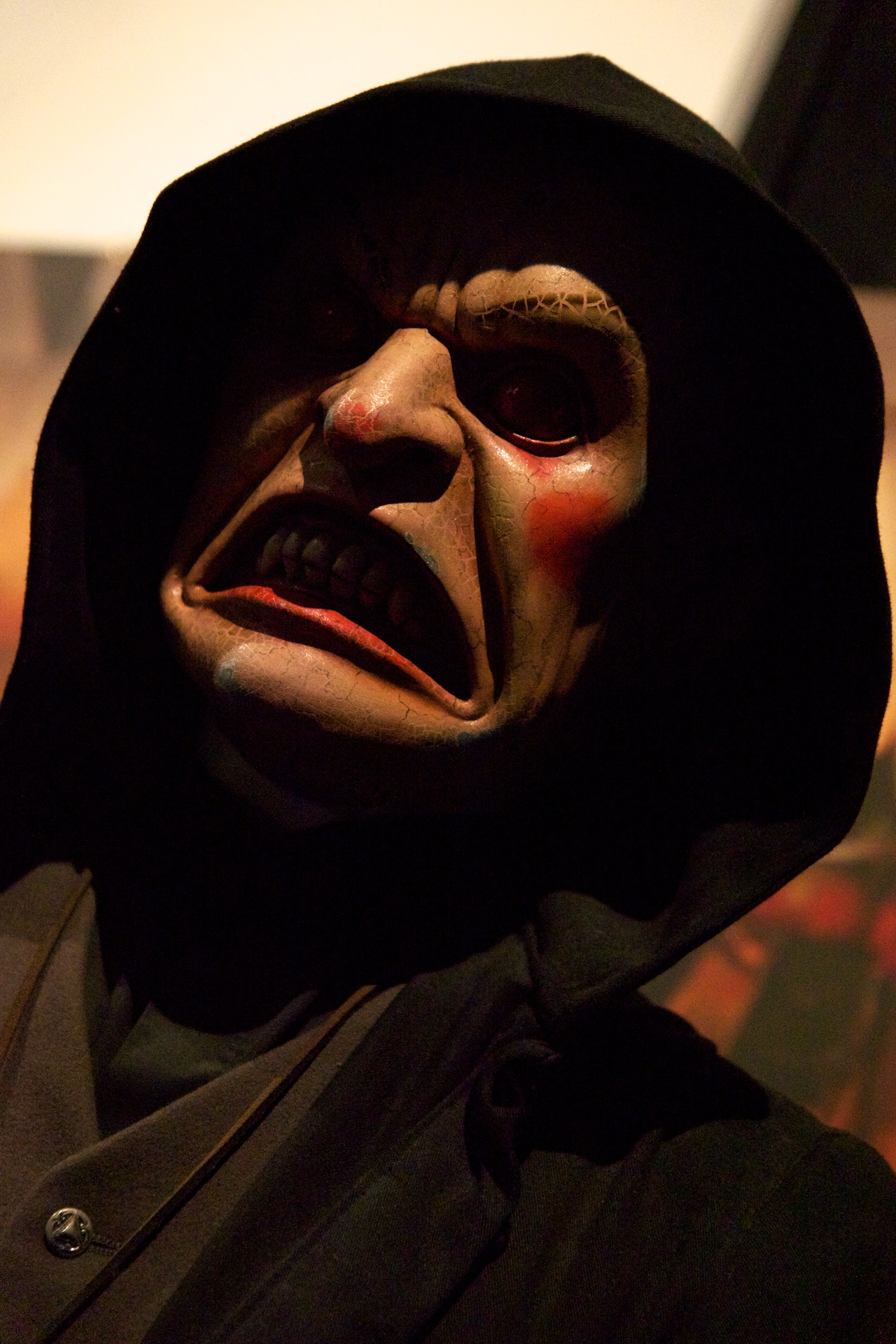
A Winder with a Smiler face on as shown at the Doctor Who Experience.

The Winders eventually capture the group, and they are taken to the Tower of London. The Doctor discovers that Starship UK rides atop a giant Star Whale, controlled by sending painful electrical impulses to its brain via a control panel in the Tower. Liz 10 finds a message from her younger self telling her that she ordered this, and is given the option either to forget and keep the Star Whale piloting the ship, or to abdicate and cause the ship's destruction.

The Doctor decides to make the Whale brain-dead, allowing it to continue travelling. As the Doctor starts the process, Amy recalls hearing the Winders' leader Hawthorne stating the Whale would not eat the children. She forces Liz 10 to hit the abdicate control; to everyone's surprise, the Whale continues travelling, at a faster speed. Amy posits that like the Doctor, the Whale had come to Earth willingly to help save the remaining children, and is helping Starship UK.

After the Doctor and Amy return to the TARDIS, they receive a call from Winston Churchill at the Cabinet War Rooms, where the shadow of a Dalek appears.

=== Continuity ===
It is noted that the Earth was abandoned in the 29th century due to solar flares; this was a central plot point of the classic serials The Ark in Space and The Sontaran Experiment. Liz 10 mentions the Doctor's previous encounters with British monarchs, including Victoria ("Tooth and Claw"), Elizabeth I (seen in "The Shakespeare Code" and referenced in "The End of Time") and Elizabeth II (Silver Nemesis). Liz 10 herself is seen again in "The Pandorica Opens" confronting an intruder in the Royal Collection in the 52nd century. The workman's tent investigated by Amy is in front of a shop called "Magpie Electricals"; a shop that first appears in "The Idiot's Lantern". The episode also continues the story arc of the crack pattern, where it appears at the end of the episode on the side of the Starship UK.

== Production ==
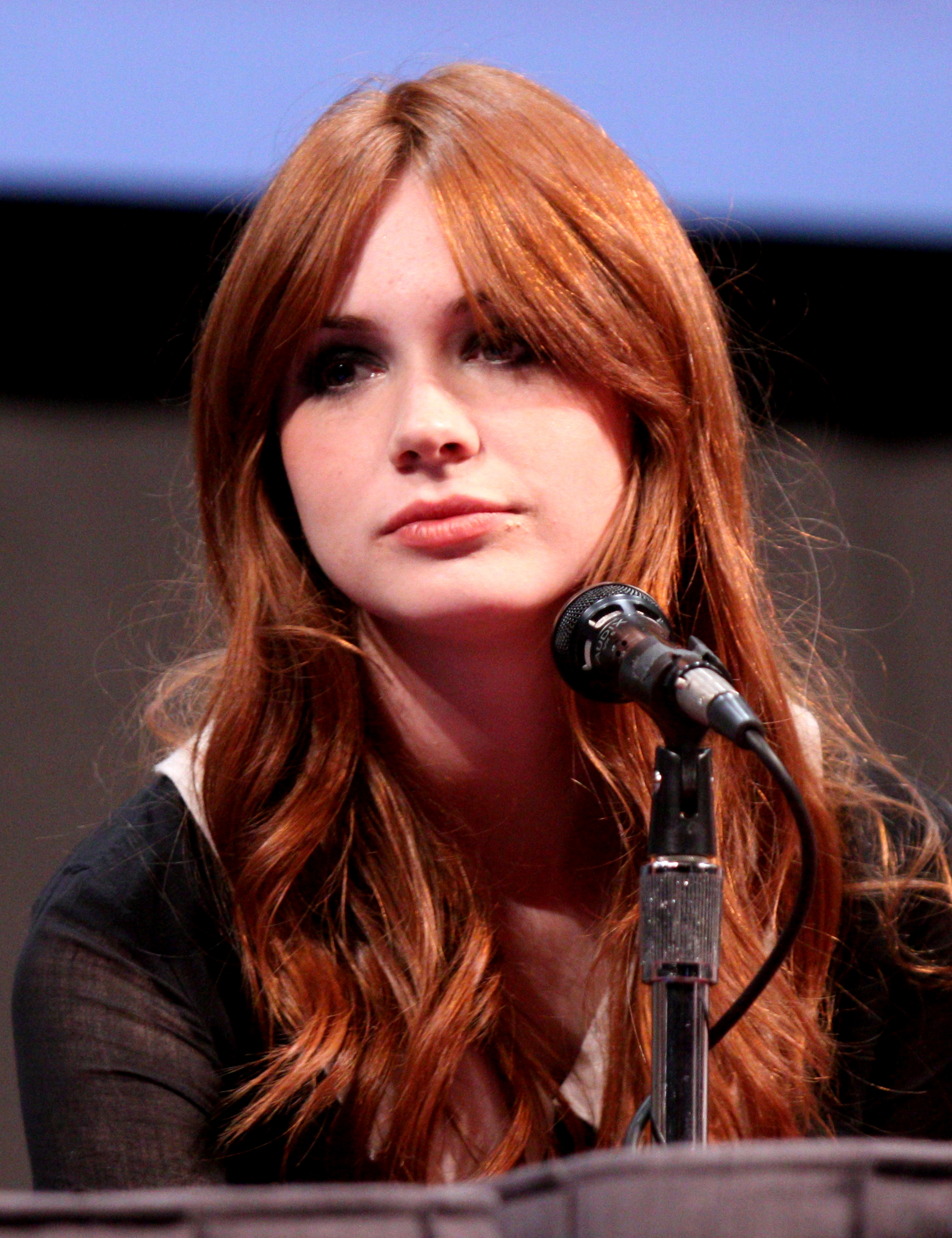
The episode was intended to show the importance of the Doctor's companion Amy Pond, played by Karen Gillan (pictured).

Executive producer and head writer Steven Moffat wrote the episode as an introduction for Amy to the role of the Doctor's companion. The episode showcases her first adventure away from her home world and her first time in space. The climax of the episode, where the Doctor decides the best thing he can do is kill the Star Whale as painlessly as possible but Amy comes up with an alternative solution that is more humane, was designed to stand out in the Doctor's memory as a failure of a huge scale. It also reinforced the Doctor's need for a companion and showed how important Amy would be to him.

"The Beast Below" was in the second production block of the series. The read-through for the episode took place 20 August 2009. Scenes set in Liz 10's Buckingham Palace were filmed at Margam Country Park, Port Talbot on a night shoot on 22 September 2009. The interior of the orangery was used as the Palace. The room in the Tower of London where the climax takes place was filmed at Neath Abbey. The industrial streets of Starship UK were filmed in a disused factory in Mamhilad, with the art department designing it in accordance with Moffat's specific description in the script. Gillan put some of her own wonder at the set into Amy's actions when she admires the street for the first time.

The set for the whale's tongue was challenging for both the art department and the actors. With guidance from the stunt co-ordinator, Smith and Gillan were required to slide down a short slide before dropping six feet. Gillan stated that this was the "most bizarre" moment of filming for her. For the opening scene in which the Doctor holds Amy's ankle while she is suspended in space, Gillan was hoisted on wires above the TARDIS prop in front of a greenscreen while a wind machine created the effects of being in space.

Both Sophie Okonedo and Terrence Hardiman, who played Liz 10 and government head Hawthorne respectively, have had experience in Doctor Who related roles. Okonedo previously portrayed Alison Cheney, a companion of the alternate Ninth Doctor known as the Shalka Doctor in the online animated serial Scream of the Shalka. Hardiman later voiced King Sitric in the Big Finish audio play The Book of Kells.

== Broadcast and reception ==
"The Beast Below" was first broadcast in the United Kingdom on BBC One on 10 April 2010. Unofficial overnight viewing figures stated that 6.4 million viewers watched on BBC One with an additional 330,000 watching a simulcast on BBC HD. This meant that the show was the most watched show of the day. When time-shifted figures were added, the viewing figures on BBC One were 7.93 million while BBC HD's ratings rose to 494,000, making the final consolidated figures for the episode 8.42 million. It was the fifth most-watched programme on BBC One for the week ending 11 April 2010 and the 11th for the week across all UK channels. The episode received an Appreciation Index of 86, considered "excellent".

"The Beast Below" was released in Region 2 on DVD and Blu-ray with the episodes "The Eleventh Hour" and "Victory of the Daleks" and special features on 7 June 2010. It was then re-released as part of the complete series five DVD on 8 November 2010.

=== Critical reception ===
The episode received generally positive reviews by television critics. Andrew Billen, writing in The Times, awarded the episode five stars, praising Matt Smith's "mercurial" Doctor, Sophie Okonedo's acting, and the concept of the episode. However, he worried that Moffat "may not be as interested in the Time Lord as the rest of his fans", referring to a scene in which the Doctor dismisses the death of his people as a "bad day". Keith Watson in Metro praised the developing relationship between the Doctor and Amy. Sam Wollaston in The Guardian noted the parallels between the future UK and modern Britain, and also confessed to "being in love with Amy Pond".

SFX Magazine's Russell Lewin gave "The Beast Below" four out of five stars, calling it "immensely satisfying". He particularly praised the two lead performances and Amy's characterisation as companion, as well as the writing and dialogue. Dan Martin, also of The Guardian, praised the story for testing the characters' relationships rather than being just a visit to the Starship UK to make it better, though he commented that the "anti-vivisection message" seemed to be lost along the way. He praised the way the Doctor was portrayed in terms of his more inhumane instincts in contrast to the Tenth Doctor and rated the episode as "four out of five". Radio Times reviewer Patrick Mulkern said that the episode "neither moved [him] to wave a Save the Starwhale banner nor reach for the nearest harpoon" and made him feel "out of the loop" as it seemed more directed at children than adults. However, he praised the acting of Smith, Gillan, and Sophie Okonedo, as well as the creation of the robotic Smilers.

IGN's Matt Wales had a more mixed opinion about the episode, rating it a "good" 7 out of 10. He considered it imaginative with "more brilliant ideas...than most other shows can muster in an entire season", but he thought the episode "never quite brought its cacophony of ideas together to form a satisfying whole", and the conclusion "failed to resonate effectively against the hodgepodge of insane ideas and action". Because of the large number of ideas, Wales also pointed out that the characterisation was "scant", especially on Liz 10 and the Smilers. However, he praised Smith's and Gillan's chemistry and Moffat's "crackling dialogue". In February 2013, Moffat cited "The Beast Below" as his least-favourite among the episodes he wrote, describing it as "a bit of a mess".
