= WHCP =

WHCP may refer to:

- WHCP-FM, a radio station (91.7 FM) licensed to serve Trappe, Maryland, United States
- WHCP-LP, a defunct low-power radio station (101.5 FM) formerly licensed to serve Cambridge, Maryland
- WQCW, a television station (channel 17, virtual 30) licensed to serve Portsmouth, Ohio, United States, which held the call sign WHCP from 1997 to 2006
- Windows Hardware Certification Program
