= The Big Bang (Doctor Who) =

Episode of Doctor Who

212b – "The Big Bang"
- Doctor Who episode

Cast
- Doctor: Matt Smith – Eleventh Doctor
- Companions: Karen Gillan – Amy Pond; Arthur Darvill – Rory Williams
- Others: Alex Kingston – River Song; Caitlin Blackwood – Amelia; Susan Vidler – Aunt Sharon; Frances Ashman – Christine; Barnaby Edwards – Stone Dalek; William Pretsell – Dave; Halcro Johnston – Augustus Pond; Karen Westwood – Tabetha Pond; Nicholas Briggs – Dalek voice

Production
- Directed by: Toby Haynes
- Written by: Steven Moffat
- Produced by: Peter Bennett
- Executive producers: Steven Moffat; Piers Wenger; Beth Willis
- Music by: Murray Gold
- Production code: 1.13
- Series: Series 5
- Running time: 2nd of 2-part story, 55 minutes
- First broadcast: 26 June 2010

Chronology
← Preceded by "The Pandorica Opens"	Followed by → "A Christmas Carol"

"The Big Bang" is the thirteenth and final episode of the fifth series of British science fiction television programme Doctor Who, first broadcast on 26 June 2010 on BBC One. It is the second part of the two-part series finale; the first part, "The Pandorica Opens", aired on 19 June. The episode was written by head writer and executive producer Steven Moffat and directed by Toby Haynes.

Following the end of the previous episode, alien time traveller the Doctor (Matt Smith) is trapped in a prison from which escape is impossible, the space-time vessel the TARDIS has blown up with the time-travelling archaeologist River Song (Alex Kingston) inside, and the Doctor's companion Amy Pond (Karen Gillan) has been shot and killed by an Auton replica of her fiancé Rory Williams (Arthur Darvill). As the universe is collapsing, the Doctor uses time travel to solve these problems and ultimately reboot the universe.

The episode sees the climax of Amy's character arc and the story arc of the series regarding the cracks in the universe, though Moffat chose to leave a few things unexplained. Taking place mainly in a museum, most scenes in the episode were shot at Brangwyn Hall in February 2010. "The Big Bang" was seen by 6.696 million viewers in the UK and received the highest Appreciation Index of the fifth series at 89. It received mostly positive reviews from critics, though many commented on the complicated nature of the plot and whether some aspects made sense. The two-part story won the 2011 Hugo Award for Best Dramatic Presentation, Short Form.

== Plot ==
The explosion of the TARDIS has caused the universe to have never existed, except for the Earth, its moon, and a sun-like object. In Roman Britain, an Auton version of Rory mourns Amy after he shot and killed her. The Eleventh Doctor appears to Rory, handing him his sonic screwdriver. Rory frees the younger Doctor trapped in the Pandorica with the screwdriver. The Doctor then places Amy's body inside the Pandorica, which will restore her once given an imprint of her living DNA. The Doctor uses River Song's vortex manipulator to jump ahead nearly two millennia; Rory, in his ageless Auton body, decides to stay with Amy and guard her.

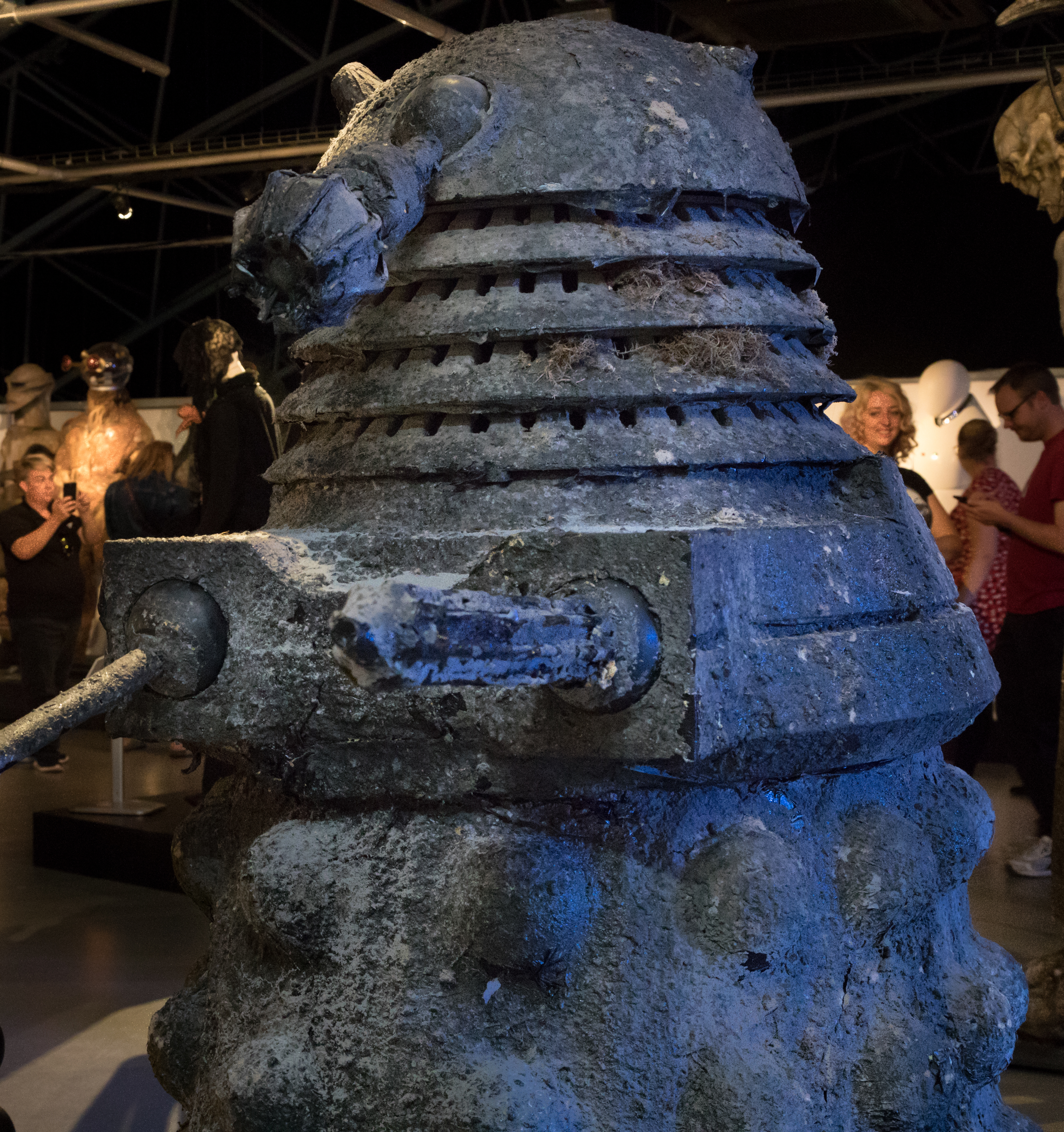
A Stone Dalek, on display at a Doctor Who exhibition

In 1996, seven-year-old Amelia Pond finds instructions from the Doctor which leads her to touch the Pandorica in a museum. This allows Amy to be revitalised and freed. They are soon joined by the Doctor and Rory, now a museum guard, and get chased by a Dalek restored by the light of the Pandorica. The Doctor uses the vortex manipulator to go back and give Rory his screwdriver. As the universe continues to collapse, Amelia disappears. The Doctor discovers that the "sun" is the still-exploding TARDIS; River, trapped inside the TARDIS, is being kept alive in a time loop. The Doctor saves River.

The Doctor creates a diversion for the Dalek, allowing him to rig the Pandorica to fly into the TARDIS explosion, using what exists of the original universe inside the Pandorica to create a second Big Bang. Before this, the Doctor instructs Amy to focus on her family and Rory to restore them in the new universe, while he stays outside to facilitate the restoration. As the Doctor witnesses events in his life in reverse, he says a final goodbye to Amelia on the night they met, then enters the cracks of the universe and disappears. (Note: During his rewind after the second Big Bang, the Doctor appears in the events of the 2010 episodes "The Eleventh Hour", "Flesh and Stone", and "The Lodger".)

Amy wakes in her home in 2010 to discover that her parents and Rory have been brought back into existence. Amy and Rory celebrate their wedding day. At the reception, River leaves her diary for Amy which prompts Amy to recall the Doctor. She interrupts her father's speech, imploring the Doctor to come to the wedding. The TARDIS and the Doctor appear at the reception.

Later, as the Doctor returns River's diary and the vortex manipulator so she can return to her own time, River tells the Doctor that he will soon find out who she is, before teleporting away. Aboard the TARDIS, the Doctor explains to Amy and Rory that unanswered questions remain about the TARDIS explosion. He then receives a telephone call alerting him to the presence of "an escaped Egyptian goddess on the Orient Express, in space". Amy leans out of the TARDIS to say goodbye to her family, and the three then leave on their next adventure.

== Production ==
=== Writing ===
Aspects of "The Big Bang" were outlined by lead writer and executive producer Steven Moffat as he planned the arc of the series. Moffat stated he left room to improvise on the story and was pleased with the result, describing it as "mad" and "amazing". Moffat stated that the title "The Big Bang" is his favourite dirty Doctor Who joke as it is a reference to the fact that Amy and Rory conceive their child on the TARDIS that night, as revealed in the next series in "A Good Man Goes to War". Gillan described Rory's vigil for Amy as the "ultimate romantic gesture" which showed how much he loved Amy, and was where Amy realised how much she loved him. Moffat thought that standing guard for two thousand years would make up for shooting her. Moffat had always intended for Amy and Rory to get married "from the off". Moffat described the conclusion as the story of how Amy has been changed by the Doctor and the Doctor's success at restoring her spirit to the girl he first met, believing that a man could drop out of the sky and "fix everything". However, he did not return for her as he had promised and she grew believing that he was a liar and could not be trusted; Amy returns to her original belief when she stands up at her wedding and proclaims that the Doctor is real and that he will arrive. Though the episode is the end of the series, Moffat left questions to be answered in the next series, including the mystery of River Song's identity and the "Silence" which appeared to cause the TARDIS to blow up.

"The Big Bang" deliberately revisits several scenes from earlier in the series. The first scene in the episode mirrors the start of "The Eleventh Hour". As the Doctor rewinds through his life, he sees events which relate to "The Lodger", but which were not shown in that episode. His conversation with Amy during the events of "Flesh and Stone", however, appeared in that episode. It was shot in extreme close-up but the Doctor's tweed jacket is still visible, which the present Doctor in that episode had previously lost to the Weeping Angels.

Moffat found it interesting that the Doctor regularly experienced time out of order and was used to a whole different kind of causality. He believed that the Doctor would attempt to cheat and break his own rules to save the universe from collapsing. The time travel used in the episode is compatible with the theory of time travel. As the episode features many "time-jumps" when the Doctor travels back to do things seen in the opening credits, Moffat decided to make it less complicated by allowing the audience to figure things out before they occurred. He did this by calling attention to the future-Doctor in the opening scenes by having him wearing a fez and holding a mop, and as the viewers saw the Doctor later acquire these items they would begin to connect the events. Moffat mentioned the fez to fellow executive producers Piers Wenger and Beth Willis; they both were worried that Smith would become too attached to the hat and want to incorporate it into his costume, but Moffat assured him that he was planning on destroying the fez. Wenger later stated that Smith was "one of the few people who can pull off a fez".

=== Filming and effects ===
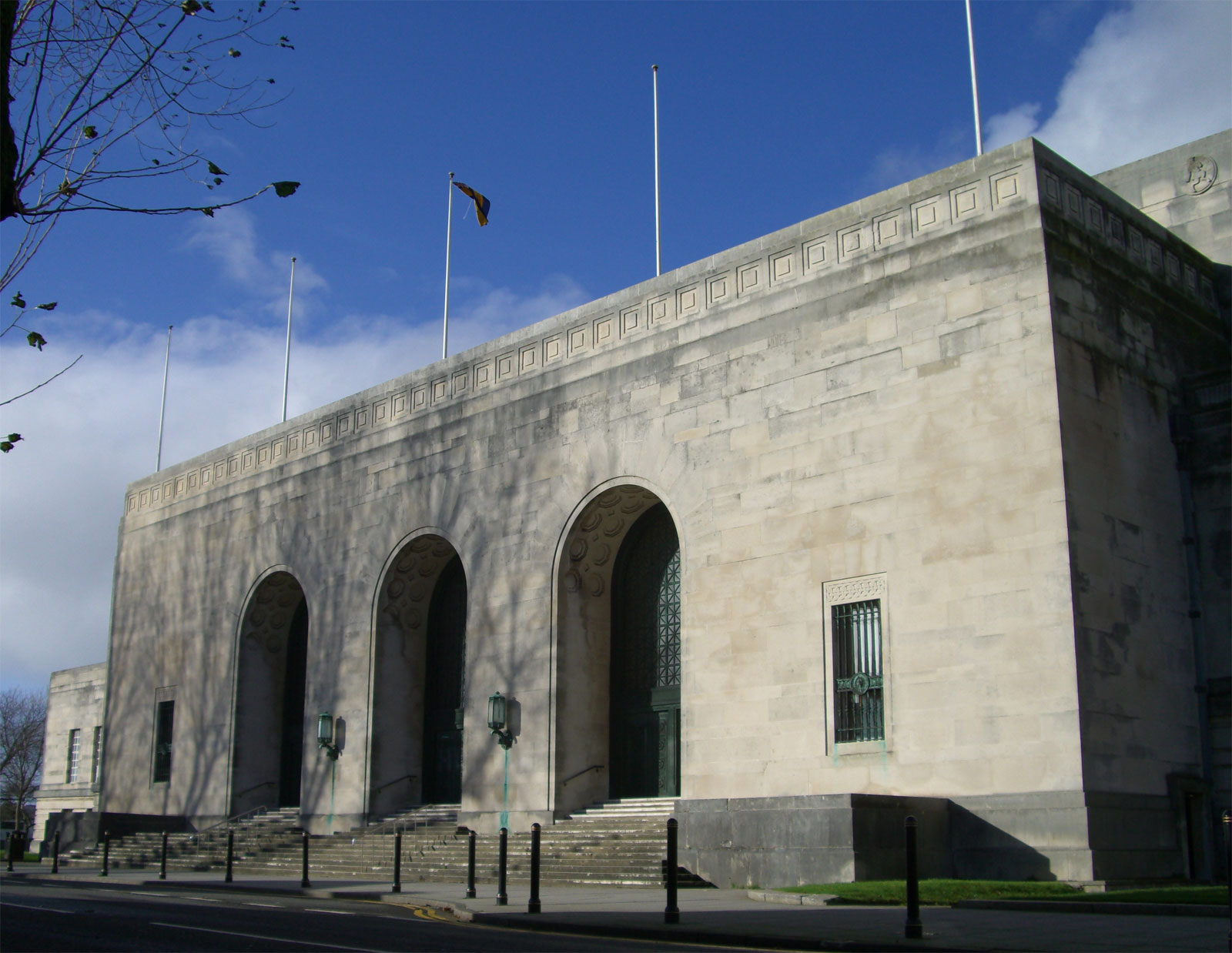
Brangwyn Hall, which was used as the primary location for the museum.

The read-through for "The Big Bang" took place on 13 January 2010 in the Upper Boat Studios. The episode was filmed in the sixth production block along with "The Pandorica Opens". The Doctor visits previous episodes as he is being erased from history; these scenes, taking place in "Flesh and Stone" and "The Lodger", were filmed with their respective episodes. The first scenes filmed for "The Big Bang" were shot in the TARDIS set, including the very last scene. The beginning of the episode, in which the fez-wearing Doctor from the future confronts Rory, was filmed on 5 February 2010 at Margam Country Park, Port Talbot. As it was filmed near the end of production of the series, "The Big Bang" had a smaller effects budget than other episodes, but this was compensated with cinematic lighting. The TARDIS appears in the time vortex during the ending credits, an idea of director Toby Haynes.

Brangwyn Hall in Swansea was used as the museum. Haynes wanted the museum to feel "massive and eerie", and coached Blackwood to "live in the moment". The opening sequence featuring young Amelia is filmed from her height, and was inspired by Steven Spielberg films in which people would look at things in awe. During this scene Haynes played appropriate music to help Blackwood get into the mood, as he had done during similar scenes when directing "The Pandorica Opens". The set was filled with things that would seem like typical exhibits in the daytime, but appeared spooky at night. The exhibits also included historical anomalies which were the result of history collapsing, such as penguins on the Nile. Though Blackwood appeared as the seven-year-old version of Amy in "The Eleventh Hour", the episode marked the first time Gillan and Blackwood—who are actually cousins—acted together. Gillan initially found this "weird", but she commented that they quickly got used to it. The two versions of Amy were purposely dressed in similar colours. The cold open ends with Amy telling her younger self "Okay kid, this is where it gets complicated" after she has been revealed in the Pandorica. Moffat, after viewing the rushes, ordered the sequence to be reshot as Gillan had said "really complicated", which conveyed a different meaning. As they had run out of time filming in the museum, all of the shots looking into the Pandorica were filmed three weeks later in the Pandorica chamber set.

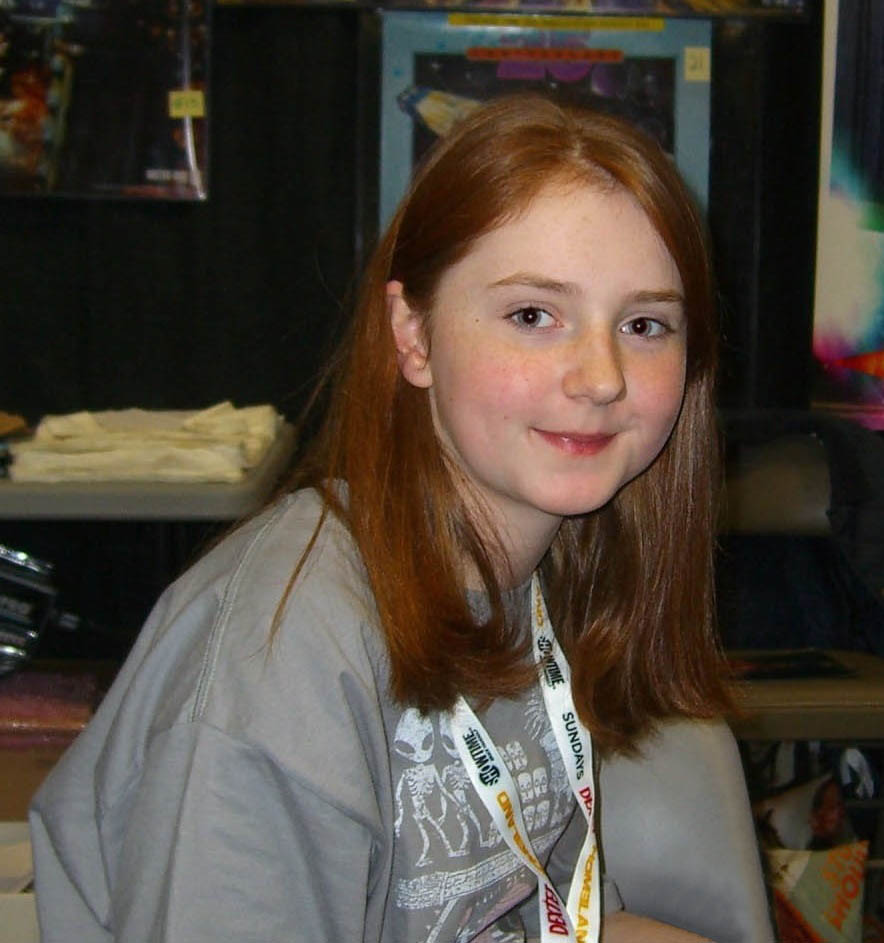
The opening sequence was filmed from the height of young Amelia, played by Caitlin Blackwood.

During the scene in which the Doctor and Rory are talking after Rory has let him out of the Pandorica, one of the stone Daleks was originally supposed to move, operated by Haynes himself. However, the scene was cut from the final episode. A stunt performer for Smith performed the sequence in which a future version of the Doctor who had been shot by a Dalek fell down the museum stairs; he did the stunt three times before Haynes captured the angles and shots he wanted. On the DVD commentary, Haynes stated that the shot in the episode is mostly the first take. River's costume in the episode was intended to resemble both the costumes of Princess Leia and Han Solo in the Star Wars films, so she appeared like a "female Han Solo".

Originally there was a scene after the four had been reunited in the museum where Amy had a "meltdown" and Rory assured her it was okay; this was cut due to pacing issues, which pleased Darvill as he disliked his performance in the scene. Gillan stated that the episode was the "most difficult" for her, as it was "a big climax for Amy and her story that's been building through the series...it just required a lot of kind of concentration and emotion." In August 2011 she stated that the Doctor and Amy's farewell was the most emotional scene for her to film. The scene in which the Doctor gives a final speech to young Amelia was not filmed with Smith and Blackwood on the same set. Smith's dialogue was shot first in the bedroom set, while the corner with the bed was recreated and filmed with Blackwood as a pick-up. Blackwood fell asleep during filming. Amy and Rory's wedding reception was filmed at Miskin Manor. Gillan found wearing the dress strange, while Darvill felt as if he was gate-crashing someone else's wedding, as he did not know any of the extras there. Haynes wanted to first show the revelation that the TARDIS would appear at the reception in a small way with minor changes such as the glasses tinkling and chandelier shaking, and build it up from there. Moffat thought that Amy would want a big wedding with a lot of dancing. In the script it was written that the Doctor was a "terrible dancer" and danced like a "drunk giraffe", and Smith additionally came up with his own routine.

== Broadcast and reception ==
"The Big Bang" was first broadcast in the United Kingdom on BBC One on 26 June 2010. The extended 55 minute episode lasted from 6:05 p.m. to 7:00. Possibly due to the early start time, overnight ratings showed that the episode was watched by 5.09 million viewers, with 4.64 million on BBC One and 445,000 on a simulcast on BBC HD. Final consolidated ratings calculated by BARB reported that the episode had been watched by a total of 6.696 million viewers, with 6.118 million on BBC One and 578,000 on BBC HD. The episode also received an Appreciation Index of 89, the highest of the series and the four main channels the day it was broadcast.

A Region 2 DVD and Blu-ray containing this episode together with "Vincent and the Doctor", "The Lodger" and "The Pandorica Opens" was released on 6 September 2010. It was then re-released as part of the complete series five DVD on 8 November 2010.

=== Critical reception ===
"The Big Bang" met with mostly positive reviews from critics. Richard Edwards of SFX gave the episode five out of five stars and wrote "Steven Moffat pulls off the remarkable feat of making it feel like the logical denouement of last week's outing." While he noted that the "end of the world" scenario was very common, he said that it had never "been quite so pleasingly complex" and that "even if there are several plot holes, it's difficult to get too worried about them when the story packs such a strong emotional wallop". Den of Geek's Simon Brew also gave the episode a positive review, writing "if you were awaiting a simple, easy-to-explain blockbuster of a Doctor Who series finale, you simply didn't get it here. Instead, if you were looking for something really very ambitious, often quite confusing, yet ultimately far more satisfying, then 'The Big Bang' absolutely hit the mark."

IGN's Matt Wales gave the episode a 10 out of 10 rating of "Masterful", describing it as "wonderfully wide-eyed, genuinely magical adventure" and adding that it "ended the series on an unquestionable high". Keith Phipps of The A.V. Club gave "The Big Bang" a B+, describing it as not "wholly successful...the climactic action is a bit too rushed and the epilogue too relaxed". While it was "still beyond-satisfactory and filled with great moments", he thought it felt "like a letdown after last week's superb 'Pandorica Opens'". Zap2it's Sam McPherson gave it an A and described it as "a great conclusion to a great season" and while "the entire universe-rescue plot was a little boring...the characters made the episode one of the best ever". However, he did wish that it kept more of the darker tone from "The Pandorica Opens", labelling "The Big Bang" as "a bit of a tonal letdown".

Dan Martin of The Guardian wrote that the "finale was brilliant – a classic modern fairytale unfolding before our eyes". Gavin Fuller, writing for The Daily Telegraph, summarised the episode as "interesting and enjoyable, but not quite the spectacular conclusion you might hope for." He particularly praised Matt Smith's portrayal of the Doctor in the scenes of his sacrifice and rewinding of his timeline, and also described the presentation of the universe collapsing as "effective". However, Fuller had some criticisms of the plot, seeing it as potentially confusing. He also expressed disappointment with the "easy" solutions to some of the problems facing the Doctor in this episode. Fuller also wrote that the episode's solutions were "rather paradoxical in nature [since the Doctor] only escapes as Rory lets him out once given the means to do so by the Doctor travelling back in time once he's escaped.", though Martin in The Guardian excused this paradox due to the episode being set "in the eye of the storm as history collapses [and so] ... hardly working to the same rulebook".

Along with "The Pandorica Opens", "The Big Bang" was awarded the Hugo Award for Best Dramatic Presentation (Short Form), the fifth time Doctor Who has won the award, and the fourth time a Steven Moffat episode has won. In February 2013, Moffat stated that "The Big Bang" was his personal favourite among the Doctor Who episodes he had written up to that point. "I thought it was just a great, fun, funny, witty episode. I was proud of that."
