= Simon Fisher-Becker =

British actor (1961–2025)

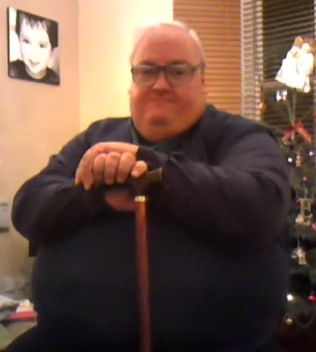
- Fisher-Becker in 2013
- Born: 25 November 1961; London, England
- Died: 9 March 2025 (aged 63); London, England
- Occupation: Actor
- Website: fisherbecker.com

Simon Fisher-Becker (25 November 1961 – 9 March 2025) was a British stage, television and film actor, specialising in comedy and character parts. His notable roles include the Fat Friar in Harry Potter and the Philosopher's Stone, and Dorium Maldovar in series 5 and 6 of Doctor Who.

== Career ==
Simon Fisher-Becker was born 25 November 1961 in London. Raised in Ruislip, in the London Borough of Hillingdon, he was mostly interested in music as a child and learned to play the clarinet and saxophone.

His first acting role was as a griffin in a primary school production of Alice in Wonderland. He discovered he liked acting better after being cast as Mr. Bumble in a school production of Oliver Twist, and studied drama in his sixth form at Northwood School. In 1975, he joined the Hillingdon Music Centre, later Hillingdon Music Service, which provided Saturday classes for music students at local public schools, and became an assistant warden in 1981. He also co-founded the Hillindon Symphony Orchestra and the Second Chance Concert Band, for which he acted as conductor.

Fisher-Becker worked in the civil service, and for a period of time worked for the House of Lords, the upper house of the Parliament of the United Kingdom. After leaving government service, (Note: Sources say he resigned or that he was made redundant.) he took a drama course and began to pursue an acting career. While seeking roles, he managed a theatre and worked as a human resources independent contractor.

In January 1988, he joined the Theatre in Education project. His group, the GCSE Syllabus Players, went on a six-week national teaching tour in public schools.

Fond of comedy and music, Fisher-Becker became a versatile character actor, and found work in film, television, and the stage, mostly in small roles. Initially, his work consisted of narration and voice-over. He later said he was "given parts because I could make people laugh." He appeared in a stage production of Edith Sitwell's Façade – An Entertainment; Tubby the Tuba, a narrative children's play with orchestral accompaniment; and as Peter III in a comedy play at the Edinburgh Festival Fringe. He had a minor role as a mini-cab driver in a 2006 episode of Afterlife, a supernatural drama.

=== Harry Potter ===
In 2000, he was cast as the Fat Friar, a friendly ghost, in the film Harry Potter and the Philosopher's Stone. He was chauffeured on the set, and sworn to secrecy about the filming. His character was featured in a Vanity Fair photo shoot. "I consider myself very lucky to have worked on Harry Potter. It was a brilliant experience," he said, although it was disappointing that most of what he filmed ended up cut from the picture.

=== Doctor Who ===
Fisher-Becker was attacked by three youths at a petrol station in March 2009. His spine was permanently damaged, and he was forced to use a walking stick for the rest of his life. Recovering from his injuries took time, and forced him to stop working in pantomime. In December 2009, he auditioned for the role of Dorium Maldovar on Doctor Who. He was excited to audition, as he had grown up watching the programme.

Fisher-Becker was to appear in one scene in the episode "The Pandorica Opens". The character Dorium Maldovar proved to be a fan favorite, and he returned to appear in the episodes "A Good Man Goes to War" and "The Wedding of River Song".

The popularity of the role led Fisher-Becker to travel all over the world to attend Doctor Who fan conventions. During this time, he became good friends with Doctor Who alumni Katy Manning and John Levene.

=== Other roles ===
Doctor Who transformed his career. He still received minor roles, such as an appearance the ensemble in the "Master of the House" number in the film Les Misérables, but began to get larger roles. He appeared in a 2012 episode of the comedy television programme Getting On in 2012, and in a 2014 episode of the comedy series Puppy Love. His biggest part, however, was as Dante Harper in 16 episodes of the superhero/crime drama Waterside.

In 2015, Fisher-Becker went on tour in Britain with a one-man show, My Dalek Has a Puncture, in which he talked about his life as a jobbing actor and his experiences on Doctor Who.

== Personal life and death ==
In addition to acting, Fisher-Becker was an author, playwright, and public speaker. He was also a well-known raconteur.

Simon met Anthony Dugdale, a musician, in 1992. The two married in 2006.

Simon Fisher-Becker died in London on 9 March 2025 at the age of 63. He is survived by his husband.

== Filmography ==
=== Television ===
- An Ungentlemanly Act (1992) as Prisoner
- Hale and Pace (1 episode, 1993) as Rugby Player
- One Foot in the Grave (1 episode, 1993) as Magician
- Doctors (1 episode, 2001) as Cyril Wilson
- Love Soup (1 episode, 2005) as Horatio
- Afterlife (1 episode, 2006) as Mini-cab driver
- Doctor Who (3 episodes "The Pandorica Opens", "A Good Man Goes to War", "The Wedding of River Song" & a prequel, 2010–2011) as Dorium Maldovar
- Doctor Who Confidential (1 episode, 2011) as himself
- Getting On (ep 3, 2012) as Stephen Ferris
- Waterside (2012) as Dante Harper
- Gay Boys (2012) as Mr Fitz-Hubbard, The Pope & Malcolm
- 3some Webseries (2013) as Roger
- Puppy Love (2014) as Tony Fazackerley

=== Film ===
- Arrivederci Millwall (1990) as Shop Manager
- Beg! (1994) as Dr. Farth
- Sweet Thing (1999) as Klaus
- Harry Potter and the Philosopher's Stone (2001) as the Fat Friar
- Chakan, the Forever Man (2012) as Ethan Scott
- Rise of the Euphonious Angel (2012) as Dante
- Les Misérables as part of the "Master of the House" ensemble
- Coveted Desires (2016) as Keith's Dad
- P.R.O.B.E. Case Files — Vol. 2 (BBV Productions, 2022) as Sir Andrew Williams

=== Audio ===
- Doctor Who: The Curse of Sleepy Hollow (fan-made production, 2013) as Father Hardwood
- Gallifrey V (Big Finish, 2013) as Kavil
- Iris Wildthyme: Series Four (episode "Going Down", Big Finish, 2013) as Lift
- Doctor Who: Tales of Mystery & Imagination (2 episodes, Illusionist Productions, 2014) as Mr. Dike

=== Radio ===
- The Hawk Chronicles (2018–2025) as Agent Tony Simon
