= The Eleventh Hour (Doctor Who) =

Episode of Doctor Who

203 – "The Eleventh Hour"
- Doctor Who episode
- The newly regenerated Doctor confronts one of the Atraxi. This scene was described as where the new incarnation, played by Matt Smith, "finally clicks into place"; however, it was not originally included in the script.

Cast
- Doctor: Matt Smith – Eleventh Doctor
- Companions: Karen Gillan – Amy Pond; Arthur Darvill – Rory Williams
- Others: Caitlin Blackwood – Amelia; Nina Wadia – Dr Ramsden; Marcello Magni– Barney Collins; Perry Benson – Ice Cream Man; Annette Crosbie – Mrs Angelo; Tom Hopper – Jeff; Arthur Cox – Mr Henderson; Olivia Colman (Note: Miscredited as "Olivia Coleman") – Mother; Eden Monteath, Merin Monteath – Children; David de Keyser – Atraxi Voice; William Wilde – Prisoner Zero Voice; Patrick Moore – Himself

Production
- Directed by: Adam Smith
- Written by: Steven Moffat
- Produced by: Tracie Simpson; Nikki Wilson (cold open)
- Executive producers: Steven Moffat; Piers Wenger; Beth Willis
- Music by: Murray Gold
- Production code: 1.1
- Series: Series 5
- Running time: 65 minutes
- First broadcast: 3 April 2010

Chronology
← Preceded by "The End of Time"	Followed by → "The Beast Below"

"The Eleventh Hour" is the first episode of the fifth series of the British science fiction television programme Doctor Who, first broadcast on BBC One and BBC HD on 3 April 2010. The episode, written by then-new head writer and executive producer Steven Moffat and directed by Adam Smith, saw a complete change in cast and production crew.

In the episode, the Eleventh Doctor (Matt Smith) crashes the TARDIS into the small English village of Leadworth, where he meets a young Scottish girl named Amelia Pond (Caitlin Blackwood). The Doctor is forced to leave in order to repair damage to the TARDIS caused during his recent regeneration and crash, but promises Amelia he will return in five minutes. However, he arrives twelve years late and is confronted by the grown-up Amelia, now known as Amy (Karen Gillan), who does not trust him. He attempts to regain her trust to help return the shape-shifting alien Prisoner Zero (Note: In its undisguised form, Prisoner Zero is voiced by William Wilde. Its disguises throughout the episode are played by Smith, Blackwood, Marcello Magni, Olivia Colman, Eden Monteath, and Merin Monteath.) to the galactic police, the Atraxi, before they destroy the Earth for harbouring Prisoner Zero.

The episode is the first to be led by Moffat, alongside executive producer Piers Wenger, after Russell T Davies and Julie Gardner stepped down after David Tennant's final two-part Christmas episode, "The End of Time". It is also the starting appearances of Smith as the Doctor, Gillan as his new companion and Arthur Darvill as Amy's boyfriend Rory Williams, who would later become a main cast member. The show's tradition is for the Doctor to rest after he regenerates, but Moffat decided to have him save the world instead. The episode sets up the main story arc of the series by introducing the cracks in the universe. "The Eleventh Hour" was seen by 10.08 million viewers in the UK, the highest rated premiere since "Rose". It also achieved popularity on the online BBC iPlayer and on BBC America in the United States. The episode received positive reviews from critics, who welcomed Smith, Gillan and Darvill into the series.

== Plot ==
Having newly regenerated, the Eleventh Doctor crash-lands his TARDIS in the English village of Leadworth. The Doctor leaves the TARDIS to self-repair while the Scottish girl Amelia Pond helps him recover. She shows him a crack in her bedroom wall that he recognises as a tear in space-time, leading to an Atraxi prison. The Atraxi alert him to the escape of Prisoner Zero. Before he can respond, he must take the TARDIS for a short trip to help its repairs, and promises Amelia he will be back in five minutes. She packs a suitcase and waits for him.

The Doctor returns twelve years later. He is accosted by an adult Amelia, now going by Amy, who has been ridiculed by the townsfolk for her fascination with her "raggedy doctor". The Doctor sees a door hidden by a perception filter in Amy's home, and finds Prisoner Zero inside. They flee before it attacks. The Atraxi arrive in Earth's orbit and, speaking through all communication devices, demand they turn over Zero or they will destroy the Earth.

Zero is able to take the form of any unconscious being that it has telepathically linked to. The Doctor and Amy run across her boyfriend Rory, a nurse who helps spot Zero posing as one of the coma patients in his care. The Doctor directs Amy and Rory to the hospital, while he gate-crashes an online meeting of experts discussing the Atraxi warning to give them instructions. Amy and Rory corner Zero at the hospital, and the Doctor arrives as the experts execute his plan, broadcasting "zero" to the Atraxi. The Atraxi trace the origin of the message to a mobile phone the Doctor is carrying. To hide from the Atraxi, Zero knocks out Amy and takes the form of Amelia. The Doctor speaks to Amy's subconscious to force Zero to take its native form, allowing the Atraxi to recapture it. Zero warns the Doctor as it is taken away "silence will fall". As the Atraxi leave Earth, the Doctor declares that he is Earth's protector and cautions them not to threaten the planet again.

Intending to take the repaired TARDIS for a short test run, the Doctor returns to Amy's house two years later. While Amy is still bitter over the Doctor's original disappearance and suspicious of his offer to travel with her, she agrees to his offer, so long as the time machine returns tomorrow morning. After departing, a wedding dress is seen in Amy's bedroom.

== Production ==
=== Background and casting ===
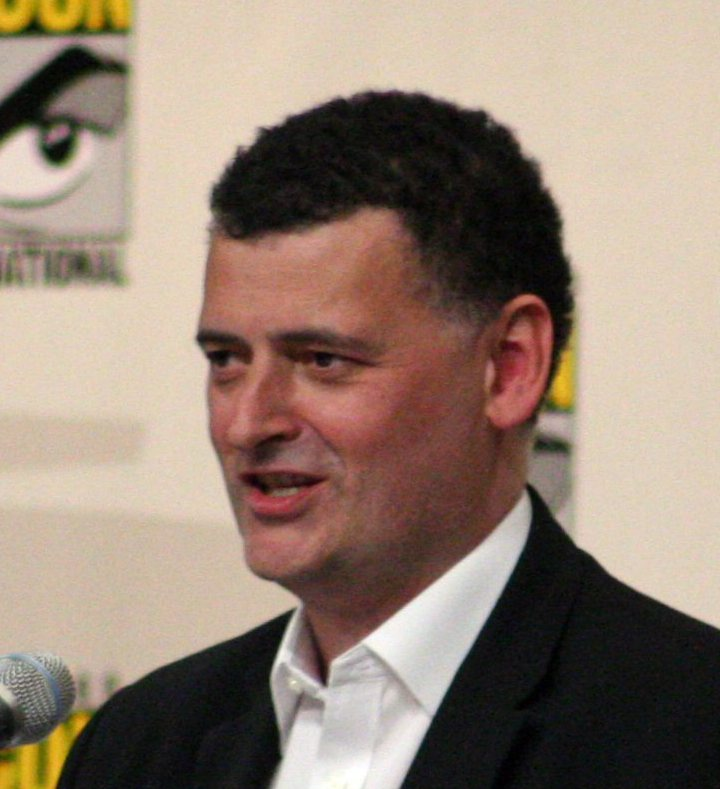
"The Eleventh Hour" was the first episode written by Steven Moffat as lead writer and executive producer of Doctor Who.

"The Eleventh Hour" marked several production changes. Steven Moffat succeeded Russell T Davies as executive producer and head writer. Piers Wenger and Beth Willis replaced Julie Gardner as executive producer. A new logo was incorporated into a new title sequence with a new variation of the theme tune, composed by Murray Gold. By the end of "The Eleventh Hour", the Doctor has a new sonic screwdriver and the TARDIS sported a new interior and exterior, similar to the one used from 1963 to 1966. The previous TARDIS interior was shown at the beginning of "The Eleventh Hour"; the Time Rotor on the console had to be rebuilt due to the explosive special effects that were used in "The End of Time".

"The End of Time" saw the end of David Tennant's tenure as the Tenth Doctor and his regeneration into Matt Smith. Moffat was originally looking to cast a middle-aged actor, but he and Wenger went with the 26-year-old Smith in what they considered an easy decision. Karen Gillan was cast as the Doctor's new companion Amy Pond; she had previously appeared in the fourth series episode "The Fires of Pompeii" and was suggested to Moffat by casting director Andy Pryor. Gillan auditioned for the role in both her natural Scottish and English accents. Only after Gillan was cast was Amy made Scottish.

The young Amy, known as Amelia, was played by Karen Gillan's real-life cousin Caitlin Blackwood. Though Gillan recommended Blackwood, the young actor first had to undergo rigorous auditions, lacking any formal acting experience. "The Eleventh Hour" was also the debut of Arthur Darvill as Rory Williams, who became a regular in the sixth series. Moffat stated that what stood out about Darvill's audition was "just how funny" he was. EastEnders star Nina Wadia was chosen for the part of the doctor at the Leadworth Hospital. Wadia speculated that she was cast because she had worked with Adam Smith before. Patrick Moore appears as himself in the video conference with a brief speaking part, though not all his lines survived the final cut. The man above Moore is the brother of Adam Smith. Marcello Magni, who played a man Prisoner Zero impersonates that barks like his dog, had already worked as a canine impersonator. Academy Award-winning actor Olivia Colman and The Umbrella Academy star Tom Hopper make pre-stardom appearances in small roles (as one of Prisoner Zero's forms, and Jeff, respectively). Arthur Cox, who played Mr. Henderson, previously played Cully in The Dominators in 1968.

=== Writing ===
"I thought it would be fun if, while he was still regenerating, he had to run around and save the world. He's barely out of the box when he realises: I haven't changed my shirt yet and I've got 20 minutes to save the world. It's like trying to save the world with flu. And he does it with two minutes to spare."

— Steven Moffat

The title of the episode is a play on words, referring both to the introduction of the eleventh Doctor and to the fact that he was nearly too late, the connotation of the phrase. In the DVD commentary, Moffat said it was originally titled The Doctor Returns, and that it was the most difficult script he had ever written, as he had to introduce a new Doctor, a new companion, convince the audience that it was both a new and an old show, and deliver a fast-paced story. While traditionally the Doctor rests after he regenerates, Moffat thought it would be fun to make him save the world instead. He described it as a comedy of a man whose day keeps getting worse and worse. Believing that London and companions from London had become a cliché and the audience had become bored with it, Moffat set the episode in the fictional village of Leadworth. Moffat, a Scot, debated whether to locate the episode in a village in Scotland. He ultimately decided on England, in keeping with the notion of Amelia as an unconventional girl.

Throughout the episode, the Doctor behaves erratically, as he gradually gets used to his new body and tastes while developing a new personality. Willis stated that he "finally clicks into place" after picking out his new outfit. The rooftop scene was not in the original script; the Doctor simply ran away from the ward and returned to the TARDIS. Moffat felt that he did not really have a formal introduction, and that more could be made of the costume, as many previous Doctors had picked theirs out quietly. The main story arc is the Doctor meeting the grown-up Amy. Moffat felt that over time the relationships between the Doctor and his companions had become too adult. He wanted to create a childlike relationship like that between Peter Pan and Wendy, rather than boyfriend and girlfriend. He believed this was the kind of relationship viewers had with the Doctor, regardless of their age. When the Doctor returns for Amy, she is a very different person from the seven-year-old he had met before. Moffat explains that she developed a tough element and had become distrustful and cynical due to him not returning as promised, forcing her to accept that he was an imaginary friend. Rory was completely in love with Amy, but Amy wanted adventures before admitting she loved him, too. Moffat described Rory as someone who had grown up in the shadow of Amy's imaginary Doctor.

Moffat was inspired by a crack in his son's bedroom wall and developed the idea into the main story arc for the fifth series. He thought that a child might think that something interesting lived inside such a crack. The hidden room in Amelia's house was based on Moffat's recurring childhood dream of a nonexistent hidden room in his grandmother's house. Moffat was keen to give the monster a giant eyeball, and commented that the Atraxi's design — a giant eyeball on a star — was easy for children to draw, as he used to draw Doctor Who monsters as a child. These aspects reflect Doctor Who's "domestically-scaled menace" principle. Moffat wrote a scene that explained Prisoner Zero's crime, but cut it because he figured no one would care.

The opening sequence, in which the Doctor barely hangs onto the crashing TARDIS as it flies over London, was later added to the script to bridge from the conclusion of "The End of Time" to the TARDIS's crash into Amy's garden. Moffat thought it would be funny if they showed him hanging out of the TARDIS and nearly crashing into London, which would start an episode set in a small town in a big way. Moffat also referenced the scene from A.A. Milne's The House at Pooh Corner, where Tigger claims to like everything, but then proceeds to reject all food offered to him until he finally finds that he likes extract of malt. Moffat's variant had the newly regenerated Doctor reject a variety of foods, with the exception of fish fingers with custard, offered to him by the young Amy. Moffat felt that appealing to children was important to the show's success. The scene where the Doctor creates the virus using Jeff's laptop was originally set in a classroom where the Doctor used the students' computers; this was changed for production reasons. In the episode, the Doctor snaps his fingers to open the TARDIS, a trick his previous incarnation learned from River Song in "Silence in the Library"/"Forest of the Dead". He also repeats the lines "wibbley-wobbley, timey-wimey" and "some cowboys in here" from the Moffat-written episodes "Blink" and "The Girl in the Fireplace".

=== Filming and effects ===
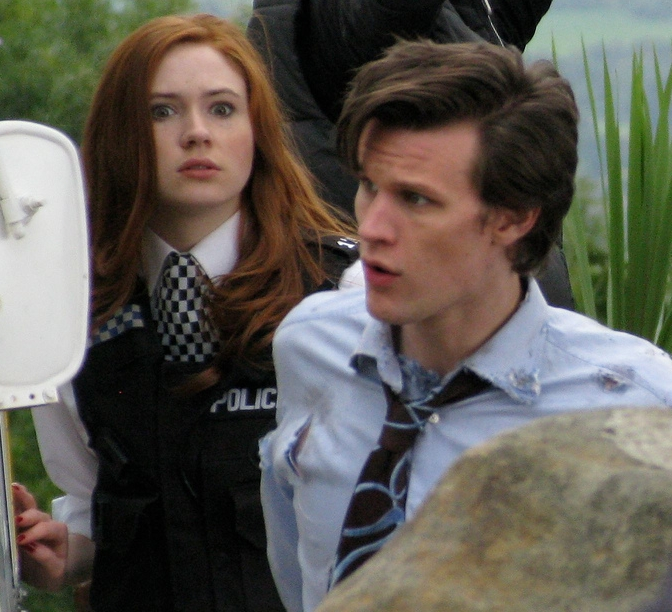
Karen Gillan and Matt Smith filming "The Eleventh Hour" in Llandaff.

The read-through for the episode took place in September 2009. Though it is the first episode of the series, "The Eleventh Hour" was not the first to be shot. It was filmed in the third production block, after the completion of episodes 2–5. As Smith was aware of how his Doctor would act in the following episodes, he used this one to establish the character. The plan was to retain traces of Smith's predecessor, but the executive producers wanted Smith to be "stranger". The episode was directed by Adam Smith, who was attracted to the "brilliant script" and working with Matt Smith after seeing him on stage. Smith was asked to direct "the same but make it a bit different – the producers didn't want it to be radically different, but they did want it to be different". The goal was to make it more "cinematic" and magical, and Smith took inspiration from E.T. and Tim Burton's work.

Amelia's house was designed to appear "spooky but ordinary" and reminiscent of a castle. Most scenes based in Leadworth were filmed in Llandaff village in Cardiff on 29 September, 5–7 October, and 20 November 2009. Photographs were taken on 5 October for the stop-frame animation sequence representing the Doctor's thought process. As the stills were taken by members of the crew and not computers the result was not perfect, which Adam Smith thought provided an "organic" feel. Plagued by torrential rain, the crew returned on 20 November to shoot the final Leadworth scenes. The production crew heavily dressed the area, adding flowers, street signs and souvenirs specific to Leadworth.

The Doctor hanging out of the TARDIS was filmed with Smith in front of a greenscreen, while the aerial footage of London was achieved with a helicopter. Smith stated that the scene was hard to visualise as it relied heavily on computer-generated images. Nearly every scene in the sequence is a visual effects shot, including a 3-D TARDIS flying over London and a CG Doctor hanging out of the TARDIS in the aerial shots. Moffat realised that the Millennium Dome was visible in the final footage, and so the scene could not be set in 1996 before it had been built. Instead of a reshoot, Moffat explained that the TARDIS could be just about to go back in time and materialise in Amelia's garden. In post-production, 30 tracks of sound effects, music composed by Murray Gold specifically for the sequence, and Smith's "grunting and groaning" were added. The primarily music-led sequence was produced by Nikki Wilson, who receives a "special thanks" credit.

While Amelia waits for the Doctor in the garden, the camera returns to her house where something, presumably Prisoner Zero, darts past the camera. It is actually Smith in footage intended for the finale, "The Big Bang", but when it did not fit into that episode it was recycled here. Originally the scene where the Doctor confirms that he is the man she remembers by showing her the apple she gave him that day was cut due to pacing issues and that the fact had been established in a previous scene. The previous scene was then cut and the apple scene returned. Due to the rain, the scene where the Doctor tries to gain the Atraxi's attention with his sonic screwdriver had to be simplified. Adam Smith based the style of the confrontation on a Western film. The destruction of the sonic screwdriver shortly after was achieved with a spark effect concealed inside the screwdriver, activated by an electrical charge that reached the screwdriver by an electrical wire that ran up Smith's sleeve and connected to a receiver. Special effects head Danny Hargreaves then used a remote control to activate the device. Contrary to reports, the effect did not injure Smith. The "fish fingers and custard" scene was shot in 12 takes. The fish fingers were actually a breaded coconut-flavoured food item; Smith estimated that he had eaten some 14 of them.

== Broadcast and reception ==
"The Eleventh Hour" was first broadcast in the United Kingdom on BBC One on 3 April 2010. Overnight figures reported that 8 million watched the episode on BBC One and the simulcast on BBC HD. Final consolidated figures rose to 9.59 million on BBC One and 494,000 on BBC HD, making the final rating for the episode 10.08 million viewers, the most-watched premiere since "Rose" and the eighth highest rated episode since Doctor Who's 2005 return. The episode was second for the entire week on BBC One and number four for the week across all channels. The episode earned an Appreciation Index of 86, considered "excellent".

The episode was also popular on BBC's online iPlayer. Within one week of broadcast, "The Eleventh Hour" received 1.27 million hits on BBC's online iPlayer service, the record for most requests in a week. It went on to become the most requested episode of 2010 with 2.241 million views; Doctor Who was named the most watched programme of the year on the service.

"The Eleventh Hour" was first broadcast in the US on BBC America on 17 April 2010 and in Canada on the same date on Space. It set a record for BBC America, with an average of 1.2 million viewers and 0.9 million in the adults aged 25–54 demographic. The episode aired in Australia on 18 April on ABC1. It could also be viewed on ABC's website iView two days prior to the television air date, on 16 April. The show was broadcast two weeks after airing in Britain, as the BBC required a fortnight to edit down the Doctor Who Confidential: Cut Down. There was no room for the accompanying Doctor Who Confidential due to the hour-long running time, but ABC holds the rights and has made it available on iView. The episode aired in New Zealand on 2 May on Prime.

=== Critical reception ===
"The Eleventh Hour" received positive reviews from critics. Benji Wilson, for The Daily Telegraph, wrote "It was ridiculous but it felt right: mad, alien, brand-new but very old. A+ to the casting director. A+ to Smith". He also said that Gillan "110 per cent nailed it". Though he compared Prisoner Zero's low-budget CGI makeup to a "draught excluder", he said that Moffat "turned a weakness into a strength" by having Prisoner Zero take the form of humans.

Daniel Martin of The Guardian called "The Eleventh Hour" "an absolute triumph" and the fact that "the story wisely doesn't waste too much time with an unstable regeneration". Though he praised Smith, he commented he was "still not feeling" the "Geronimo!" catchphrase. Radio Times reviewer Patrick Mulkern believed it was "obvious" that Smith's Doctor would be "up there with the greatest" and also praised Gillan, though he was unsure of the rescored theme tune. He also praised Moffat's script for "[offering] funny lines...directorial flourishes and a host of blink-and-miss star turns". Zap2it's Sam McPherson gave the episode an A+, saying that it was "definitely" his favourite and praised the debut of Smith, Gillan and the redesigned TARDIS. Paul Kerton, also of the site, praised Adam Smith for "[handling] the episode beautifully", the depth in Amy's character, and Matt Smith's take on the role. However, he thought the downside to the episode were the "slightly poor effects" and "somewhat lightweight story", and while he called the new title sequence "absolutely beautiful", he was unsure of the new variation of the theme tune.

Dave Golder of SFX magazine gave "The Eleventh Hour" five out of five stars, thinking that Moffat captured "the way children perceive the Doctor" and praising the debuts of Smith and Gillan. The A.V. Club reviewer Keith Phipps gave the episode an A−, explaining that he liked Smith "a lot" but was not sure if the Eleventh Doctor was separate enough from the Tenth yet. He called Gillan "instantly winning" and that the story was "no exception" from Moffat's typical "exceptionally strong narratives, keen sense of character, and efficient plotting". Maureen Ryan of The Chicago Tribune stated that the episode "works" as an introduction, though it could be "almost too jokey at times". Though she felt the series was in good hands with Smith and Gillan, she derided the Atraxi for being "alarmingly static and ultimately uninteresting" and the story's "little substance". IGN's Matt Wales rated the episode 8 out of 10, praising it for easily fitting into the show's continuity, especially with Smith's portrayal of the Doctor. However, he thought the "calamity plot" was the "weakest link in an otherwise superb opening episode" and the "whole bunch of disparate elements ... never [gelled] into a satisfying whole". Though he said it was not perfect with "a saggy midsection and slightly naff CGI effects", he thought it was still "wondrous in so many ways". New York Times reviewer Mike Hale wrote that the episode worked like "a well-oiled piece of machinery", but it came across as "routine" with "none of the over-the-top exuberance" of Davies' run. While he noted that Gillan "looks promising", he felt that Smith was too much like Tennant and would "[need] to start shaping his own take on the role".

Den of Geek selected the episode as Doctor Who's highlight in their "Best TV Episodes of 2010" article. In 2011, after the airing of the next series, Digital Spy called the episode "still Smith and Moffat's finest hour". Digital Spy also named "The Eleventh Hour" the seventh best episode of the entire programme in 2013.

The episode attracted some criticism from viewers who complained that Amy's character and occupation as a kissogram was "too sexy" for a family programme. Gillan defended her character, claiming that girls Amy's age often wore short skirts and it showed the character had confidence, while executive producer Piers Wenger said, "The whole kissogram thing played into Steven's desire for the companion to be feisty and outspoken and a bit of a number. Amy is probably the wildest companion that the Doctor has travelled with, but she isn't promiscuous".

== Home media ==
"The Eleventh Hour" was released in Region 2 on DVD and Blu-ray with the following episodes "The Beast Below" and "Victory of the Daleks" on 7 June 2010. It was then re-released as part of the complete series five DVD on 8 November 2010.

=== In print ===
The Eleventh Hour
- Author: Trevor Baxendale
- Series: Doctor Who novelisations
- Publisher: Pearson Education
- Publication date: May 2011
- ISBN: 9781408274118

Pearson Education published a novelisation of this episode by Trevor Baxendale for school literacy programs in May 2011.
