= Algonquin, Maryland =

- Census-designated place
- Coordinates: 38°35′4″N 76°5′48″W
- Country: United States
- State: Maryland
- County: Dorchester

Area
  - Total: 2.85 sq mi (7.37 km^{2})
  - Land: 0.75 sq mi (1.95 km^{2})
  - Water: 2.09 sq mi (5.42 km^{2})
- Elevation: 13 ft (4 m)

Population (2020)
  - Total: 1,220
  - Density: 1,624.1/sq mi (627.08/km^{2})
- Time zone: UTC−5 (Eastern (EST))
  - Summer (DST): UTC−4 (EDT)
- ZIP code: 21613
- Area codes: 410, 443 and 667
- FIPS code: 24-00712
- GNIS feature ID: 0596419

Algonquin is a census-designated place (CDP) in Dorchester County, Maryland, United States. The population was 1,241 at the 2010 census. The community was named for the Algonquin people, one of the Native American tribes in the East.

== Geography ==
Algonquin is located in northern Dorchester County at 38°35′4″N 76°5′48″W (38.584385, −76.096703). It is bordered to the south and east by the city of Cambridge, the county seat. The northern limit of the CDP is the center of the tidal Choptank River, an arm of the Chesapeake Bay.

According to the United States Census Bureau, the Algonquin CDP has a total area of 2.8 square miles (7.3 km^{2}), of which 0.73 square miles (1.9 km^{2}) is land and 2.1 square miles (5.4 km^{2}), or 73.85%, is water.

== Demographics ==
Historical population
| Census | Pop. | Note | %± |
|---|---|---|---|
| 2020 | 1,220 | | — |
U.S. Decennial Census

As of the census of 2000, there were 1,361 people, 582 households, and 426 families residing in the CDP. The population density was 1,275.4 inhabitants per square mile (492.4/km^{2}). There were 606 housing units at an average density of 567.9 per square mile (219.3/km^{2}). The racial makeup of the CDP was 96.77% White, 1.76% African American, 0.88% Asian, 0.29% from other races, and 0.29% from two or more races. Hispanic or Latino of any race were 1.25% of the population.

There were 582 households, out of which 24.2% had children under the age of 18 living with them, 63.2% were married couples living together, 8.6% had a female householder with no husband present, and 26.8% were non-families. 23.4% of all households were made up of individuals, and 15.1% had someone living alone who was 65 years of age or older. The average household size was 2.33 and the average family size was 2.71.

In the CDP, the population was spread out, with 18.7% under the age of 18, 4.3% from 18 to 24, 22.3% from 25 to 44, 30.6% from 45 to 64, and 24.1% who were 65 years of age or older. The median age was 48 years. For every 100 females, there were 85.9 males. For every 100 females age 18 and over, there were 81.9 males.

The median income for a household in the CDP was $56,250, and the median income for a family was $61,750. Males had a median income of $31,625 versus $30,850 for females. The per capita income for the CDP was $28,483. None of the families and 2.2% of the population were living below the poverty line, including no under eighteens and 2.0% of those over 64.
