= WHCP-FM =

- Trappe, Maryland; United States
- Broadcast area: Cambridge, Maryland; Algonquin, Maryland
- Frequency: 91.7 MHz
- Branding: "WHCP Radio"

Programming
- Format: Variety
- Affiliations: NPR

Ownership
- Owner: Mid-Shore Community Radio, Inc.

History
- First air date: July 4, 2015 (Note: As WHCP-LP 101.5. It was replaced with WHCP-FM 91.7 on July 15, 2023.)
- Former call signs: WHCP-LP (2014–2023)
- Former frequencies: 101.5 MHz (2014–2023)
- Call sign meaning: "We Help Cambridge Prosper!"

Technical information
- Licensing authority: FCC
- Facility ID: 762627
- Class: B1
- Power: 14,000 watts
- HAAT: 48 meters (157 ft)
- Transmitter coordinates: 38°34′7.2″N 76°4′30.5″W

Links
- Public license information: Public file; LMS
- Webcast: Listen live
- Website: whcp.org

WHCP-FM (91.7 FM) is a variety-formatted public and community radio station licensed to Trappe, Maryland, and serving Cambridge and Algonquin in Maryland. WHCP-FM is owned and operated by Mid-Shore Community Radio, Inc.

The station is the successor to WHCP-LP (101.5 FM), which went on the air July 4, 2015. On July 15, 2023, WHCP-LP was relaunched as WHCP-FM, on 91.7 FM. The station is now an NPR member station that airs a mix of regular NPR programming, such as All Things Considered, interlaced with music and community shows focused on the Mid-Shore area of Maryland. On August 1, 2023, Cambridge Community Radio surrendered the original WHCP-LP license to the Federal Communications Commission, who cancelled it the same day.

== See also ==
- List of community radio stations in the United States
