= Production blocking =

People in interactive, brainstorming groups generally produce fewer and less creative ideas than they would have if they were working individually. Production blocking, the tendency for one individual during a group discussion to block or inhibit other people from offering ideas, is a major reason for this.

Production blocking occurs when people are prevented from thinking or participating because they are listening to other people instead. For example, if one person in a six-person group is talking about his or her idea, then the other five people are "blocked" and less able to provide their own creative input. Another factor to consider is that in group discussions, individuals may end up having off-topic conversations with other members. This can lead to production blocking because group members are not contributing to the goal of generating ideas.

Production blocking is a form of distraction. It differs from both evaluation apprehension and social loafing, two other factors that can cause people to produce fewer ideas in real, interactive groups than those in nominal groups. With evaluation apprehension, individuals may be reluctant to share their suggestions, fearing that they may be negatively criticized. With social loafing, they may not share ideas because they believe other group members will do so instead.

== Methods to decrease production blocking ==
- Writing down thoughts: Taking notes is recommended when group members in brainstorming groups are waiting for their chance to speak. When communication is not available, writing down one's thoughts could be helpful to prevent productivity loss. Although the note taking method may reduce the production blocking problem, research has shown that it does not increase the quantity of ideas produced.
- Nominal Groups: Reviews of research on brainstorming groups and nominal groups suggest that nominal groups surpass brainstorming groups. Unlike traditional brainstorming groups, nominal groups consist of a body of individuals whose ideas can be shared without any interaction with others. Because, individuals in nominal groups do not have to wait to share their thoughts, their ideas will not be forgotten or lost.
- Brainstorming online: Instead of physically interacting with other members of a brainstorming group, electronic brainstorming consists of communication via a computer. Like nominal groups, members of electronic brainstorming groups do not have to worry about waiting their turn to speak. Furthermore, the ideas that group members come up with can easily be stored and saved for later. Ideas may also be shared anonymously, allowing group members to share their thoughts without the potential for embarrassment.
- Increased Competition: When rewards are introduced for ideas, whether for larger individual contributions or credit for one's own ideas, overall group production increases. Group members are more self-focused and likely to share their thoughts regardless of what others may have already said.
